= Becky Hill discography =

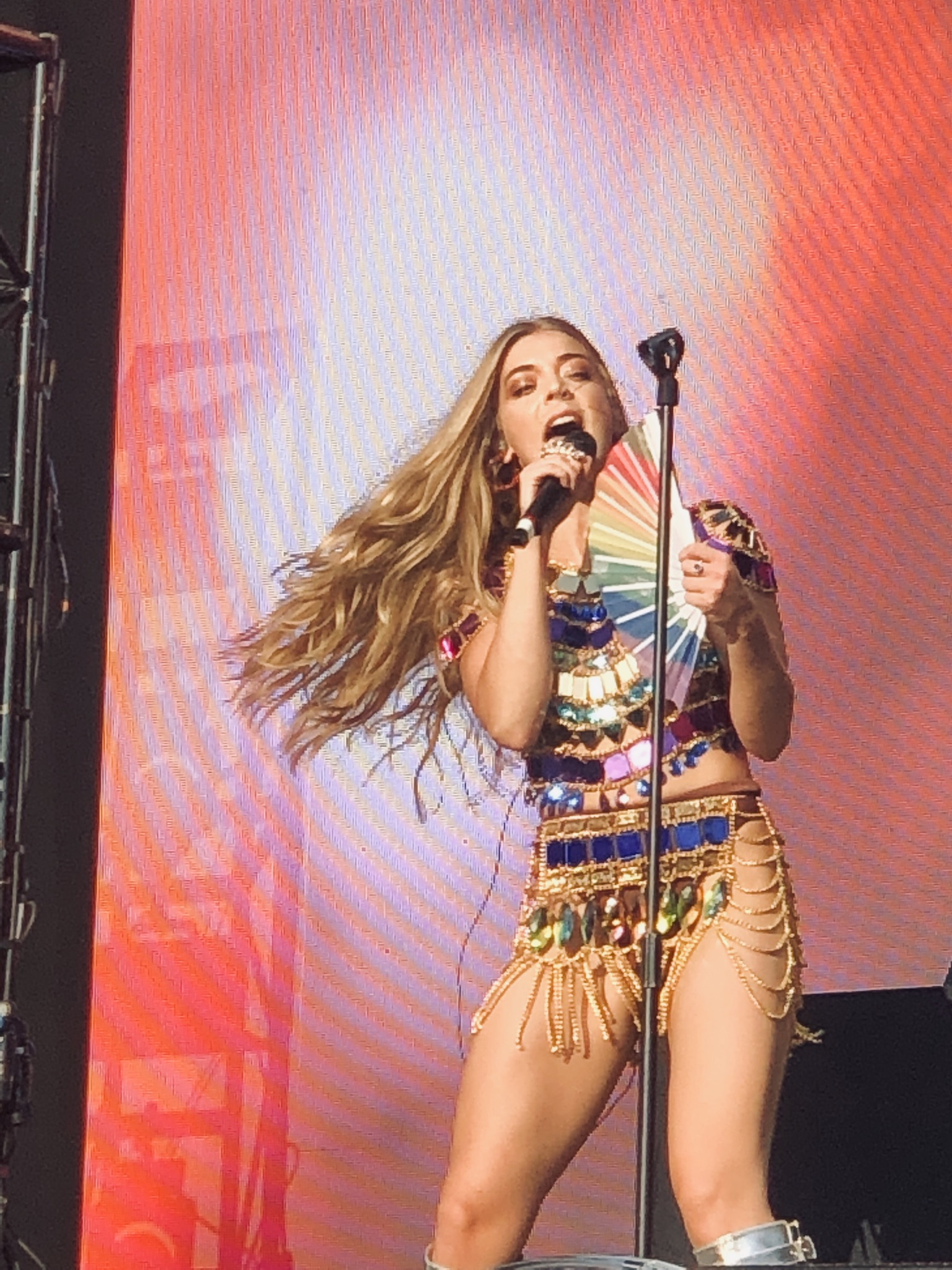
- Hill performing at Manchester Pride 2019
- Studio albums: 3
- EPs: 2
- Compilation albums: 1
- Singles: 37

This is the discography of English singer Becky Hill. She released her first EP, Losing, in November 2015. She released her second EP, Eko, in August 2017. The EP includes the singles "Back to My Love", "Warm", "Rude Love" and "Unpredictable". She released her first compilation album, Get to Know, in September 2019. The album peaked at number twenty on the UK Albums Chart. The album includes the singles "Afterglow", "Gecko", "Piece of Me", "False Alarm", "Sunrise in the East", "Back & Forth", "I Could Get Used to This" and "Wish You Well".

Hill released her debut album Only Honest on the Weekend on 27 August 2021.

In May 2024, Hill released her second studio album Believe Me Now?. The album was precceded by the release of seven singles "Side Effects", "Disconnect", "Never Be Alone", "Outside of Love", "Right Here", "True Colours" and "Multiply" that was released at the same day as the album. "Swim" was released as the seventh single from the album in November 2024. "Indestructible" with Andy C was later included on the digital re-issue of the project.

In 2025, Hill released two collaborations, first one was "Surrender" with Swedish DJ and producer Alesso. The second one being "Don't Look Down" with English singer-songwriter Gary Barlow.

From April 2026 to September that year, Hill released the singles "Hands on Me", "More! More! More!", "What Do I Have to Do" and "Changes" in promotion of her third studio album Rebecca, which was released in November 2026.

== Albums ==
=== Studio albums ===
| Title | Details | Peak chart positions | | | | | | | | Sales | Certifications |
| Title | Details | UK | BEL (FL) | IRE | NLD | NOR | NZ | SCO | US Dance | Sales | Certifications |
|---|---|---|---|---|---|---|---|---|---|---|---|
| Only Honest on the Weekend | Released: 27 August 2021; Label: Polydor; Formats: CD, LP, digital download, streaming | 7 | — | 5 | 99 | 18 | — | 6 | 4 | UK: 107,843 | BPI: Platinum; RMNZ: Platinum |
| Believe Me Now? | Released: 31 May 2024; Label: Polydor; Formats: CD, LP, digital download, streaming | 3 | 177 | 54 | — | — | 29 | 7 | — | | BPI: Gold; RMNZ: Gold |
| Rebecca | Released: 13 November 2026; Label: Polydor; Formats: CD, LP, digital download, streaming | 6 | 139 | — | — | — | — | 13 | — | | |
"—" denotes album did not chart in that territory.

=== Compilation albums ===
| Title | Details | Peak chart positions | | | | Certifications |
| Title | Details | UK | FRA | IRE | US Dance | Certifications |
|---|---|---|---|---|---|---|
| Get to Know | Released: 27 September 2019; Label: Polydor; Format: Digital download, streaming | 20 | 173 | 14 | 15 | BPI: Platinum; RMNZ: Gold |

== Extended plays ==
| Title | Details |
|---|---|
| Eko | Released: 11 August 2017; Label: Self-released; Formats: Digital download, streaming |
| Christmas | Released: 4 December 2021; Label: Universal; Formats: Digital download, streaming |

== Singles ==
=== As lead artist ===
| Title | Year | Peak chart positions | | | | | | | | | | Certifications | Album |
| Title | Year | UK | UK Dance | AUS | AUT | GER | IRE | NLD | SWE | SWI | US Dance | Certifications | Album |
|---|---|---|---|---|---|---|---|---|---|---|---|---|---|
| "Gecko (Overdrive)" (with Oliver Heldens) | 2014 | 1 | 1 | 71 | 35 | 23 | 30 | 48 | 55 | 23 | 33 | BPI: 3× Platinum; BVMI: Gold; RMNZ: 2× Platinum | Get to Know |
| "Caution to the Wind" | 2014 | — | — | — | — | — | — | — | — | — | — | | Non-album singles |
| "Losing" | 2014 | 56 | — | — | — | — | — | — | — | — | — | | Non-album singles |
| "All My Love" (with Watermät and TAI) | 2015 | 115 | 28 | — | — | — | — | — | — | — | — | | Non-album singles |
| "Back to My Love" (featuring Little Simz) | 2016 | — | — | — | — | — | — | — | — | — | — | | Eko |
| "Piece of Me" (with MK) | 2016 | 37 | 12 | — | — | — | 53 | — | — | — | 30 | BPI: 2× Platinum | Get to Know |
| "False Alarm" (Note: "False Alarm" also features on Matoma's debut studio album Hakuna Matoma and second album One in a Million.) (with Matoma) | 2016 | 28 | 12 | — | — | — | 51 | — | 11 | — | 16 | BPI: Platinum; RIAA: Gold; RMNZ: Gold | Get to Know |
| "Warm" | 2016 | — | — | — | — | — | — | — | — | — | — | | Eko |
| "Rude Love" | 2017 | — (Note: "Rude Love" did not enter the Official Singles Chart but peaked at number 30 on the Official Independent Top 50.) | — | — | — | — | — | — | — | — | — | | Eko |
| "Unpredictable" | 2017 | — | — | — | — | — | — | — | — | — | — | | Eko |
| "Sunrise In the East" | 2018 | — | 38 | — | — | — | — | — | — | — | — | | Get to Know |
| "Back & Forth" (with MK and Jonas Blue) | 2018 | 12 | 2 | 88 | — | — | 11 | — | — | — | 32 | BPI: Platinum; RMNZ: Gold | Get to Know |
| "I Could Get Used to This" (with Weiss) | 2019 | 45 | 6 | — | — | — | 30 | — | — | — | — | BPI: Platinum | Get to Know |
| "Wish You Well" (Note: "Wish You Well" also appears on Sigala's debut compilation album Every Cloud – Silver Linings.) (with Sigala) | 2019 | 8 | 1 | — | — | — | 8 | — | — | 64 | 32 | BPI: 2× Platinum; RMNZ: Gold | Get to Know |
| "Lose Control" (with Meduza and Goodboys) | 2019 | 11 | 2 | 11 | 53 | 30 | 7 | 19 | 75 | 22 | 4 | BPI: 2× Platinum; ARIA: 4× Platinum; BVMI: Platinum; GLF: Platinum; IFPI AUT: Gold; RIAA: Platinum; RMNZ: 3× Platinum | Get to Know |
| "Only You" | 2019 | — | — | — | — | — | — | — | — | — | — | | Christmas |
| "Better Off Without You" (with Shift K3Y) | 2020 | 14 | — | — | — | — | 15 | — | — | — | 46 | BPI: Platinum; ARIA: Gold | Only Honest on the Weekend |
| "Nothing Really Matters" (with Tiësto) | 2020 | 76 | 18 | — | — | — | — | 56 | — | — | 24 | | The London Sessions |
| "Heaven on My Mind" (Note: "Heaven on My Mind" also appears on Sigala's debut compilation album Every Cloud – Silver Linings.) (with Sigala) | 2020 | 14 | 6 | — | — | — | 19 | — | — | — | 46 | BPI: Platinum; ARIA: Gold | Only Honest on the Weekend |
| "Space" | 2020 | 79 | — | — | — | — | — | — | — | — | — | | Only Honest on the Weekend (Deluxe) |
| "Forever Young" | 2020 | 35 | — | — | — | — | — | — | — | — | — | BPI: Silver | Christmas |
| "Wake Up with You" (with Bruno Martini and Magnificence) | 2021 | — | — | — | — | — | — | — | — | — | — | | Original |
| "Last Time" | 2021 | 39 | — | — | — | — | 51 | — | — | — | — | BPI: Gold | Only Honest on the Weekend |
| "Remember" (with David Guetta) | 2021 | 3 | 1 | 34 | — | — | 3 | 6 | 51 | 96 | 8 | BPI: 3× Platinum; ARIA: 3× Platinum; GLF: 2× Platinum; RIAA: Gold; RMNZ: 3× Platinum | Only Honest on the Weekend |
| "My Heart Goes (La Di Da)" (with Topic) | 2021 | 11 | 1 | 100 | — | 87 | 6 | — | — | — | 26 | BPI: Platinum; ARIA: 2× Platinum; GLF: Gold; RMNZ: Gold | Only Honest on the Weekend |
| "Here for You" (with Wilkinson) | 2022 | 43 | 12 | — | — | — | — | — | — | — | — | BPI: Silver; RMNZ: 2× Platinum | Cognition |
| "Run" (with Galantis) | 2022 | 21 | 7 | — | — | — | 36 | 92 | — (Note: "Run" did not enter the Swedish Singellista Chart, but peaked at number nine on the Swedish Heatseeker Chart.) | — | 17 | BPI: Gold | Only Honest on the Weekend (Deluxe) |
| "Crazy What Love Can Do" (with David Guetta and Ella Henderson) | 2022 | 5 | 2 | 100 | 64 | 26 | 5 | 13 | 57 | 29 | 12 | BPI: 2× Platinum; ARIA: Platinum; BVMI: Gold; IFPI AUT: Platinum; IFPI SWI: 2× Platinum; RMNZ: Platinum | Only Honest on the Weekend (Deluxe) and Everything I Didn't Say and More |
| "History" (with Joel Corry) | 2022 | 18 | 9 | — | — | — | 13 | 88 | — | — | 30 | BPI: Gold | Only Honest on the Weekend (Deluxe) and Another Friday Night |
| "Heaven" | 2023 | — | — | — | — | — | — | — | — | — | — | | Non-album single |
| "Side Effects" (with Lewis Thompson) | 2023 | 35 | 12 | — | — | — | 42 | — | — | — | 20 | BPI: Silver | Believe Me Now? |
| "Disconnect" (with Chase & Status) | 2023 | 6 | 2 | — | — | — | 26 | — | — | — | 34 | BPI: 2× Platinum; RMNZ: 2× Platinum | Believe Me Now? |
| "Never Be Alone" (with Sonny Fodera) | 2024 | 23 | 8 | — | — | — | 64 | — | — | — | — | BPI: Silver | Believe Me Now? |
| "Outside of Love" | 2024 | 54 | 18 | — | — | — | — | — | — | — | — | BPI: Silver | Believe Me Now? |
| "Right Here" | 2024 | 60 | 17 | — | — | — | — | — | — | — | — | BPI: Silver | Believe Me Now? |
| "True Colours" (with Self Esteem) | 2024 | — | — | — | — | — | — | — | — | — | — | | Believe Me Now? |
| "Multiply" | 2024 | — | — | — | — | — | — | — | — | — | — | | Believe Me Now? |
| "Indestructible" (with Andy C) | 2024 | 56 | 9 | — | — | — | — | — | — | — | — | BPI: Silver | Believe Me Now? |
| "Swim" (with MK) | 2024 | — | 38 | — | — | — | — | — | — | — | — | | Believe Me Now? |
| "Surrender" (with Alesso) | 2025 | — | — | — | — | — | — | — | — | — | — | | Non-album single |
| "Don't Look Down" (with Gary Barlow) | 2025 | — (Note: "Don't Look Down" did not enter the UK Singles Chart, but peaked at number 66 on the UK Download Chart.) | — | — | — | — | — | — | — | — | — | | Meanwhile |
| "Hands On Me" | 2026 | — | — | — | — | — | — | — | — | — | — | | Rebecca |
| "More! More! More!" | 2026 | — | — | — | — | — | — | — | — | — | — | | Rebecca |
| "What Do I Have to Do?" | 2026 | — | — | — | — | — | — | — | — | — | — | | Rebecca |
| "Say Something" (with Sonny Fodera) | 2026 | 73 | 20 | — | — | — | — | — | — | — | — | | Non-album single |
| "Changes" | 2026 | — | — | — | — | — | — | — | — | — | — | | Rebecca |
| "Lost the Plot" | 2026 | — | — | — | — | — | — | — | — | — | — | | Rebecca |
"—" denotes a single that did not chart or was not released in that territory.

=== As featured artist ===
| Title | Year | Peak chart positions | | | | Certifications | Album |
| Title | Year | UK | UK Dance | BEL (FL) | SCO | Certifications | Album |
|---|---|---|---|---|---|---|---|
| "Afterglow" (Wilkinson featuring Becky Hill) | 2013 | 8 | 1 | — (Note: "Afterglow" did not enter the Ultratop 50, but peaked at number four on the Ultratip chart.) | 15 | BPI: 3× Platinum; RMNZ: 5× Platinum | Lazers Not Included /Get to Know |
| "Powerless" (Rudimental featuring Becky Hill) | 2014 | 73 | 19 | — | 90 | BPI: Silver | Home |
| "Kiss My (Uh Oh) (Girl Power Remix)" (Anne-Marie and Little Mix featuring Becky Hill, Raye & Stefflon Don) | 2021 | — | — | — | — | | Non-album single |
| "Hold On" (Netsky featuring Becky Hill) | 2021 | — | — | 45 | — | RMNZ: 2× Platinum | Second Nature |
| "Don't Know About You" (B Live featuring Becky Hill and Jme) | 2021 | — | — | — | — | | Non-album single |
"—" denotes a single that did not chart or was not released in that territory.

=== Promotional singles ===
| Title | Year | Album |
|---|---|---|
| "Business" (with Ella Eyre) | 2021 | Only Honest on the Weekend |
| "Have Yourself a Merry Little Christmas" | 2021 | Christmas |
| "Personally" | 2021 | Only Honest on the Weekend (Deluxe) |

== Other charted songs ==
| Title | Year | Peak chart positions | Album |
| Title | Year | NZ Hot | Album |
|---|---|---|---|
| "Tie Me Down" | 2026 | 30 | Rebecca |

== Guest appearances ==
| Title | Year | Other performer(s) | Album |
|---|---|---|---|
| "Sing It Back" | 2017 | Pete Tong, Jules Buckley, Heritage Orchestra | Ibiza Classics |
| "Over You" | 2020 | Tiësto | The London Sessions |
| "Hold On" | 2020 | Netsky | Second Nature |
| "Everything" | 2021 | —N/a | Everybody's Talking About Jamie |

== Songwriting credits ==
| Title | Year | Artist | Album | Co-written with |
|---|---|---|---|---|
| "All I See" (featuring Tanya Lacey) | 2014 | Bondax | Non-album singles | Adam Kaye, George Townsend, Uzoechi Emenike |
| "Last All Night (Koala)" (featuring KStewart) | 2014 | Oliver Heldens | Non-album singles | Oliver Heldens, Uzoechi Emenike |
| "It'll All End in Tears" | 2015 | Andrea Faustini | Kelly | Jonathan Green, Philip Thornalley |
| "Gone Missing" (featuring BB Diamond) | 2015 | Shift K3Y | Non-album singles | Lewis Jankel |
| "Be Without You" | 2016 | KStewart | Non-album singles | Kate Stewart, Uzoechi Emenike |
| "Touch" (featuring Arlissa) | 2016 | Tough Love | Past Present Future | Stefan O'Brian, Alexander Prinzivalli, Karen Poole |
| "Love's Just a Feeling" (featuring Rooty) | 2016 | Lindsey Stirling | Brave Enough | Lindsey Stirling, Autumn Rowe, Tobias Gad, Anton Zaslavski, Niko Hartikainen |
| "Secrets" (with KStewart) | 2017 | WHTKD | Non-album singles | Anthony Whiting, James Newman |
| "Word of Mouth" (featuring Bree Runway) | 2018 | Metroplane | Non-album singles | Vito de Luca, Alexander Drury, Uzoechi Emenike, Ryan Campbell |
| "Crazy World" | 2018 | MNEK | Language | Uzoechi Emenike |
| "Watch Love Die" | 2018 | Melo Moreno | Colors | Daniel Heløy Davidsen, Peter Wallevik, Mich Hansen, Jorgen Elofsson |
| "Walkaway" (featuring BB Diamond) | 2018 | White N3rd | Non-album single | Scott Wild, Marvin Humes, Wayne Hector, Tre Jean-Marie |
| "All Day and Night" (with Martin Solveig and Madison Beer) | 2019 | Jax Jones | Snacks (Supersize) | Timucin Aluo, Martin Picandet, Camille Purcell, Mark Ralph, Hailee Steinfeld, Janee Bennett |
| "Ultimatum" (featuring Laura White) | 2019 | MistaJam | Non-album single | Peter Dalton, Uzoechi Emenike |
| "Wann Wachen Wir Auf" | 2021 | Helene Fischer | Rausch | Axel Bosse, Fabian Römer, Helene Fischer, Bryn Christopher, Jacob Manson |
| "Words" (featuring Zara Larsson) | 2022 | Alesso | Non-album single | Alessandro Lindblad, Karen Ann Poole, Zara Larsson |
| "Life's Too Short (English Version)" | 2022 | Aespa | Girls | Sam Klempner, Uzoechi Emenike |
| "Feels This Good" (with Mae Muller and Caity Baser featuring Stefflon Don) | 2023 | Sigala | Every Cloud | Bruce Fielder, Joakim Jarl, Ella McMahon, Natalie Dunn, Michael Harwood, Dennis White, Amie Miriello, Stephanie Allen |
| "Never Be Lonely" (with Zoe Wees) | 2024 | Jax Jones | Non-album single | Timucin Aluo, Mark Ralph, Tom Demac, Ina Wroldsen & Frances |
| "Leave The Light On" (with Louisa Johnson) | 2025 | Craig David | Commitment | Craig David, Mike Brainchild, Negin Djafari & Thomas McKenzie Ball |
