= The Voice UK discography =

- Studio albums: 12
- Singles: 126

The Voice UK is the British version of The Voice of Holland, a television talent series. The series was created by John de Mol and features four coaches looking for a talented new artist, with the intent that a potential auditionee could become a global superstar. The show's concept is simple; the auditionee walks on to the stage with the judges' backs turned to them, rendering looks, personalities, stage presence or dance routines irrelevant, and starts singing. If the judges like what they hear, they will turn around, indicating intent to coach them. If more than one coach turns round, power falls into the hands of the singer. Once all four teams are complete, the live shows begin and the singers sing songs chosen for them by the coaches.

The Voice UK has been referred to as a "big, exciting and warm-hearted series" and a "new generation in its genre" by The Guardian. The show ran on BBC One from 2012 to 2016, and is currently running on ITV Network. The current coaches are will.i.am, Sir Tom Jones, Danny Jones, Tom Fletcher, and Kelly Rowland. Past coaches have included Jessie J, Danny O’Donoghue, Kylie Minogue, Ricky Wilson, Rita Ora, Boy George, Paloma Faith, Gavin Rossdale, Jennifer Hudson, Olly Murs, Meghan Trainor, Anne-Marie, and Leann Rimes.

The Voice UK's discography includes 30 top 40 singles on the UK Singles Chart, 9 of which went top 10 and includes 2 UK number ones; "Gecko (Overdrive)" from Series 1 Semi-finalist Becky Hill (with Oliver Heldens) in 2014 and "Babydoll" by Series 6 finalist Jamie Miller in 2026. The show has also spawned five top fifty albums on the UK Albums Chart, including one top 5 single and three top 10 albums, not including singles and albums released during artists' former careers.

== Singles ==
Musician	Series	Position in show	Song title	UK release date	UK peak chart position	Ref(s)
Leanne Mitchell	1	1	"Run to You"	16 June 2012	45	
Bo Bruce	1	2	"Running Up That Hill"	23 June 2012	69	
Bo Bruce	1	2	"Nothing Compares 2 U"	23 June 2012	182	
Bo Bruce	1	2	"Save Me"	29 April 2013	93	
Tyler James	1	2	"Higher Love"	23 June 2012	39	
Tyler James	1	2	"Sign Your Name"	23 June 2012	189	
Tyler James	1	2	"Single Tear"	27 October 2012	28	
Tyler James	1	2	"Worry About You"	16 February 2013	38	
Jaz Ellington	1	2	"Ordinary People"	23 June 2012	162	
Vince Kidd	1	4	"Like a Virgin"	23 June 2012	97	
Vince Kidd	1	4	"Always on My Mind"	23 June 2012	134	
Vince Kidd	1	4	"Sick Love"	4 November 2012	198	
Max Milner	1	Final 8	"Free Fallin'"	23 June 2012	63	
Max Milner	1	Final 8	"All Our Lives (Needy Me)"	19 May 2013	130	
Becky Hill	1	Final 8	"Afterglow"	13 October 2013	8	
Becky Hill	1	Final 8	"Powerless"	23 February 2014	73	
Becky Hill	1	Final 8	"Gecko (Overdrive)"	22 June 2014	1	
Becky Hill	1	Final 8	"Losing"	22 November 2014	56	
Becky Hill	1	Final 8	"Piece Of Me"	27 February 2016	37	
Becky Hill	1	Final 8	"False Alarm"	24 June 2016	28	
Becky Hill	1	Final 8	"Back & Forth"	12 September 2016	12	
Becky Hill	1	Final 8	"I Could Get Used to This"	29 March 2019	45	
Becky Hill	1	Final 8	"Wish You Well"	24 May 2019	8	
Becky Hill	1	Final 8	"Lose Control"	11 October 2019	11	
Becky Hill	1	Final 8	"Only You"	6 December 2019	DNC	
Becky Hill	1	Final 8	"Better Off Without You"	10 January 2020	14	
Becky Hill	1	Final 8	"Nothing Really Matters"	17 April 2020	76	
Becky Hill	1	Final 8	"Heaven on My Mind"	26 June 2020	14	
Becky Hill	1	Final 8	"Space"	2 October 2020	79	
Becky Hill	1	Final 8	"Forever Young"	13 November 2020	35	
Becky Hill	1	Final 8	"Wake Up With You"	29 January 2021	DNC	
Becky Hill	1	Final 8	"Last Time"	26 March 2021	39	
Becky Hill	1	Final 8	"Remember"	17 June 2021	3	
Becky Hill	1	Final 8	"My Heart Goes (La Di Da)"	27 August 2021	11	
Becky Hill	1	Final 8	"Have Yourself a Merry Little Christmas"	26 November 2021	DNC	
Becky Hill	1	Final 8	"Don’t Know About You"	17 December 2021	DNC	
Becky Hill	1	Final 8	"Here For You"	11 February 2022	43	
Becky Hill	1	Final 8	"Run"	25 February 2022	21	
Becky Hill	1	Final 8	"Crazy What Love Can Do"	8 April 2022	5	
Becky Hill	1	Final 8	"History"	5 August 2022	18	
Becky Hill	1	Final 8	"Only You"	10 November 2022	DNC	
Becky Hill	1	Final 8	"Heaven"	19 January 2023	DNC	
Becky Hill	1	Final 8	"Side Effects"	12 May 2023	35	
Becky Hill	1	Final 8	"Disconnect"	14 July 2023	6	
Becky Hill	1	Final 8	"Never Be Alone"	19 January 2024	24	
Becky Hill	1	Final 8	"Outside of Love"	28 March 2024	54	
Becky Hill	1	Final 8	"Right Here"	1 May 2024	60	
Becky Hill	1	Final 8	"True Colours"	24 May 2024	DNC	
Becky Hill	1	Final 8	"Multiply"	29 May 2024	DNC	
Becky Hill	1	Final 8	"Indestructible"	29 August 2024	73	
Becky Hill	1	Final 8	"Swim"	29 November 2024	DNC	
Becky Hill	1	Final 8	"Surrender"	4 April 2025	DNC	
Becky Hill	1	Final 8	"Don’t Look Down"	18 July 2025	DNC	
Becky Hill	1	Final 8	"Hands On Me"	29 April 2026	DNC	
Becky Hill	1	Final 8	"More! More! More!"	27 May 2026	DNC	
Becky Hill	1	Final 8	"what do i have to do?"	3 July 2026	DNC	
Becky Hill	1	Final 8	"Say Something"	21 August 2026	73	
Becky Hill	1	Final 8	"Changes"	10 September 2026	DNC	
Becky Hill	1	Final 8	"Lost The Plot"	30 October 2026	DNC	
Andrea Begley	2	1	"Ho Hey"	7 June 2013	98	
Andrea Begley	2	1	"One of Us"	15 June 2013	103	
Andrea Begley	2	1	"My Immortal"	22 June 2013	30	
Leah McFall	2	2	"I Will Survive"	7 June 2013	8	
Leah McFall	2	2	"Killing Me Softly"	15 June 2013	36	
Leah McFall	2	2	"I Will Always Love You"	22 June 2013	43	
Leah McFall	2	2	"Home" (featuring will.i.am)	27 July 2014	56	
Mike Ward	2	2	"When I Was Your Man"	7 June 2013	60	
Mike Ward	2	2	"Picking Up the Pieces"	15 June 2013	72	
Cleo Higgins	2	Final 8	"Don't Let Go (Love)"	15 June 2013	92	
Karl Michael	2	Final 8	"I Believe I Can Fly"	15 June 2013	183	
Jermain Jackman	3	1	"And I Am Telling You I'm Not Going"	19 April 2014	75	
Stevie McCrorie	4	1	"Lost Stars"	5 April 2015	6	
Kevin Simm	5	1	"All You Good Friends"	9 April 2016	24	
Divina de Campo	5	Blind Audition	"Break Up Bye Bye"	31 October 2019	35	
Mo Adeniran	6	1	"Unsteady"	2 April 2017	78	
Jamie Miller	6	3	"Babydoll"	7 August 2026	1	
Ruti	7	1	"Dreams"	7 April 2018	14	
Ruti	7	1	"Racing Cars"	5 April 2019	49	
Donel	7	2	"Bang Like a Drum"	20 July 2018	DNC	
Donel	7	2	"Planets"	29 March 2019	DNC	
Donel	7	2	"Wish You Well"	7 August 2020	DNC	
Donel	7	2	"Dance 4 Glory"	28 August 2020	DNC	
Donel	7	2	"Left Right"	22 January 2021	DNC	
Donel	7	2	"Motion"	9 April 2021	DNC	
Molly Hocking	8	1	"I'll Never Love Again"	6 April 2019	73	
Molly Hocking	8	1	"After the Night Before"	6 November 2020	DNC	
Molly Hocking	8	1	"We Can Have The World Tonight"	11 June 2021	DNC	
Molly Hocking	8	1	"Alive"	31 December 2021	DNC	
Molly Hocking	8	1	"Bones"	22 June 2022	DNC	
Molly Hocking	8	1	"You Can’t Hold Me Down"	21 June 2024	DNC	
Molly Hocking	8	1	"The Upside"	18 October 2024	DNC	
Molly Hocking	8	1	"Did You Want It At All?"	15 November 2024	DNC	
Molly Hocking	8	1	"History Repeating"	14 September 2025	DNC	
Molly Hocking	8	1	"I’d Rather Lie"	15 January 2026	DNC	
Molly Hocking	8	1	"Wait For Me"	9 April 2026	DNC	
Molly Hocking	8	1	"Self Sabotage"	2 October 2026	DNC	
Remember Monday	8	Knockouts	"Find My Way"	14 October 2019	DNC	
Remember Monday	8	Knockouts	"Version of You"	25 September 2020	DNC	
Remember Monday	8	Knockouts	"Fat Bottomed Girls"	2 July 2021	DNC	
Remember Monday	8	Knockouts	"What I Know Now"	20 August 2021	DNC	
Remember Monday	8	Knockouts	"Nothing Nice To Say"	25 November 2020	DNC	
Remember Monday	8	Knockouts	"Let Down"	13 January 2023	DNC	
Remember Monday	8	Knockouts	"Laugh About It"	5 January 2024	DNC	
Remember Monday	8	Knockouts	"Hand in My Pocket"	9 January 2024	DNC	
Remember Monday	8	Knockouts	"Show Face"	8 March 2024	DNC	
Remember Monday	8	Knockouts	"Brown Eyed Girl"	19 April 2024	DNC	
Remember Monday	8	Knockouts	"what the girls bathroom is for"	14 June 2024	DNC	
Remember Monday	8	Knockouts	"Famous"	20 September 2024	DNC	
Remember Monday	8	Knockouts	"What the Hell Just Happened?"	7 March 2025	31	
Remember Monday	8	Knockouts	"Happier"	25 July 2025	DNC	
Blessing Chitapa	9	1	"Angels"	14 November 2020	DNC	
Blessing Chitapa	9	1	"I Smile"	12 March 2021	DNC	
Blessing Chitapa	9	1	"Stay With Me"	25 March 2022	DNC	
Blessing Chitapa	9	1	"The Divide"	5 August 2022	DNC	
JJ	9	Knockouts	"Wasted Love"	6 March 2025	53	
Craig Eddie	10	1	"Come Waste My Time"	20 March 2021	DNC	
Craig Eddie	10	1	"The Outside"	9 July 2021	DNC	
Nørskov	10	Semi-Final	"Straight From The Heart"	18 June 2021	DNC	
Anthonia Edwards	11	1	"Anyone"	29 October 2022	DNC	
Anthonia Edwards	11	1	"All I Do Is Try"	22 December 2023	DNC	
HUNNI	12	1	"I'm Every Woman"	30 December 2023	DNC	
HUNNI	12	1	"Heartbeat"	19 April 2024	DNC	
HUNNI	12	1	"5+5"	18 October 2024	DNC	
Hope Winter	12	Runner Up	"Small Talk"	5 September 2025	DNC	
Hope Winter	12	Runner Up	"Once In A While (In Love Again)"	8 November 2025	DNC	
Hope Winter	12	Runner Up	"Missing You"	27 March 2026	DNC	
Hope Winter	12	Runner Up	"If You Ever Loved Me"	7 August 2026	DNC	
Hope Winter	12	Runner Up	"So Easily"	2 October 2026	DNC	
AVA	13	1	"The Long and Winding Road"	26 October 2024	DNC	

== Albums ==
Only albums that charted in the Top 100 of the UK albums chart are included in this list.

Artist	Series	Position in show	Album title	UK release date	UK peak chart position	Ref(s)
Tyler James	1	2	A Place I Go	29 October 2012	47	
Bo Bruce	1	2	Before I Sleep	29 April 2013	10	
Becky Hill	1	Final 8	Get to Know	27 September 2019	20	
Becky Hill	1	Final 8	Only Honest on the Weekend	27 August 2021	7	
Becky Hill	1	Final 8	Believe Me Now?	31 May 2024	3	
Becky Hill	1	Final 8	Rebecca	13 November 2026	6	
Andrea Begley	2	1	The Message	21 October 2013	7	
Bob Blakeley	3	Blind auditions	Performance	19 May 2014	34	
Jermain Jackman	3	1	Jermain Jackman	23 March 2015	42	
Stevie McCrorie	4	1	Big World	8 January 2016	35	
Mo Jamil	6	1	Evolve	30 March 2018	36	

== See also ==
- Popstars (UK) discography
- Fame Academy discography
- Pop Idol discography
- The X Factor (UK) discography
