= MNEK production discography =

The following list is a discography of production and songwriting contributions by MNEK, a British record producer and recording artist from East London, United Kingdom. It is split into the full list of contributions and those that have performed in the charts across various countries.

== International singles and certifications ==
List of written or produced contributions that were made singles, with year released, artist(s) involved, selected chart positions, certifications and album name. This also includes credited featured appearances, but not collaborations where MNEK is labelled as primary.
Title	Year	Peak chart positions										Certifications	Album
Title	Year	UK	AUS	BEL (FL)	NOR	GER	NL	NZ	SWI	SWE	US	Certifications	Album
"All Fired Up" (The Saturdays)	2011	3	—	—	—	—	—	—	—	—	—	BPI: Silver	On Your Radar
"Home Run" (Misha B)	2012	11	—	—	—	—	—	—	—	—	—		Non-album single
"Hottest Girl in the World" (JLS)	2012	6	—	—	—	—	—	—	—	—	—		Evolution
"Need U (100%)" (Duke Dumont featuring A*M*E)	2013	1	40	17	—	43	20	—	—	—	—	BPI: Platinum; ARIA: Platinum	Non-album single
"Wanna Go" (Maxsta featuring Little Nikki)	2013	43	—	—	—	—	—	—	—	—	—		Non-album single
"Ready for Your Love" (Gorgon City featuring MNEK)	2014	4	—	2	—	58	98	—	—	—	—	BPI: Platinum	Sirens
"Here for You" (Gorgon City featuring Laura Welsh)	2014	7	—	31	—	48	—	—	—	—	—	BPI: Silver	Sirens
"Gecko (Overdrive)" (Oliver Heldens and Becky Hill)	2014	1	71	—	—	23	48	—	23	55	—	BPI: x2 Platinum; BVMI: Gold	Get to Know
"What Are You Waiting For?" (The Saturdays)	2014	38	—	—	—	—	—	—	—	—	—		Finest Selection: The Greatest Hits
"Sing That Song" (Tieks featuring Celeste)	2014	90	—	—	—	—	—	—	—	—	—		Non-album single
"Losing" (Becky Hill)	2014	56	—	—	—	—	—	—	—	—	—		Non-album single
"Say Something" (Karen Harding)	2014	7	—	—	—	—	—	—	—	—	—	BPI: Platinum	Non-album single
"Last All Night (Koala)" (Oliver Heldens featuring KStewart)	2014	5	—	—	—	53	—	—	—	—	—	BPI: Silver	Non-album single
"Revive (Say Something)" (LuvBug featuring Mark Asari)	2014	17	—	—	—	—	—	—	—	—	—		Non-album single
"Living for Love" (Madonna)	2014	26	—	4	—	40	—	—	49	8	—	FIMI: Gold	Rebel Heart
"Feel Good (It's Alright)" (Blonde featuring Karen Harding)	2015	76	—	99	—	—	—	—	—	—	—		Non-album single
"Rumour Mill" (Rudimental featuring Will Heard and Anne-Marie)	2015	67	68	13	—	—	—	—	—	—	—	BPI: Silver	We the Generation
"Piece of Me" (MK and Becky Hill)	2016	37	—	32	—	—	—	—	—	—	—	BPI: Platinum	Get to Know
"Hold Up" (Beyonce)	2016	11	25	1	—	—	—	—	—	77	13	BPI: Gold; RIAA: Platinum; ARIA: Gold	Lemonade
"Final Song" (MØ)	2016	14	12	37	9	16	19	20	26	42	—	BPI: Platinum; ARIA: x2 Platinum; IFPI DEN: x2 Platinum; RIAA: Gold; RMNZ: Gold; NVPI: Platinum; GLF: Platinum; FIMI: Platinum	Forever Neverland: Japanese Edition
"False Alarm" (Matoma and Becky Hill)	2016	28	—	48	3	—	—	—	—	11	—	BPI: Gold	One in a Million
"House Work" (Jax Jones featuring Mike Dunn and MNEK)	2016	85	—	—	—	—	—	—	—	—	—	BPI: Silver	Snacks (Supersize)
"Ain't My Fault" (Zara Larsson)	2016	13	17	26	8	16	28	19	43	1	76	BPI: Platinum; GLF: x3 Platinum; BEA: Gold; BVMI: Gold; ARIA: x2 Platinum; RMNZ: Gold; RIAA: Platinum; IFPI SWI: Gold	So Good
"Time" (Sabina Ddumba)	2016	—	—	—	—	—	—	—	—	91	—		Homeward Bound
"Touch" (Little Mix)	2016	4	13	24	—	—	69	22	—	—	—	BPI: x2 Platinum; FIMI: Gold; NVPI: Gold; RMNZ: Gold; BEA: Gold; ARIA: Platinum; PMB: x2 Platinum; MC: Platinum	Glory Days
"You Don't Know Me" (Jax Jones featuring Raye)	2016	3	12	2	7	3	8	35	5	6	—	BPI: x2 Platinum; ARIA: x2 Platinum; RIAA: Gold; GLF: x2 Platinum; BVMI: x3 Gold; FIMI: x3 Platinum; BEA: x2 Platinum; SNEP: Diamond	Snacks (Supersize)
"Blinded by Your Grace, Pt. 2" (Stormzy featuring MNEK)	2017	7	—	—	—	—	—	—	—	—	—	BPI: Platinum	Gang Signs & Prayer
"What They Say" (Zara Larsson)	2017	—	—	—	—	—	—	—	—	31	—		So Good
"IDGAF" (Dua Lipa)	2017	3	3	4	5	12	8	5	19	15	49	BPI: x2 Platinum; ARIA: x4 Platinum; BEA: Gold; RIAA: x2 Platinum; RMNZ: Platinum; BVMI: Gold; GLF: Platinum	Dua Lipa
"Up in Here" (5 After Midnight)	2017	51	—	—	—	—	—	—	—	—	—		Non-album single
"Instruction" (Jax Jones featuring Demi Lovato and Stefflon Don)	2017	13	72	37	—	31	50	6	—	94	—	BPI: Platinum; BVMI: Gold; PMB: Gold; FIMI: Gold	Snacks (Supersize)
"Heavy" (Anne-Marie)	2017	37	—	31	—	—	—	—	—	—	—	BPI: Silver	Speak Your Mind
"Breathe" (Jax Jones featuring Ina Wroldsen)	2017	7	—	14	—	15	51	—	13	—	—	BPI: Platinum; BEA: Gold; MC: Gold; BVMI: Gold; FIMI: Gold	Snacks (Supersize)
"Heaven" (Julia Michaels)	2018	77	—	7	4	71	58	—	69	23	—	BPI: Silver; MC: Gold; IFPI DEN: Gold; IFPI NOR: Platinum	Fifty Shades Freed OST
"Ring Ring" (Jax Jones featuring Mabel and Rich the Kid)	2018	12	—	14	—	—	—	—	—	—	—	BPI: Gold	Snacks (Supersize)
"Back & Forth" (MK, Jonas Blue and Becky Hill)	2018	12	—	—	—	—	—	—	—	—	—	BPI: Platinum	Get to Know
"No Drama" (James Hype featuring Craig David)	2018	24	—	—	—	—	—	—	—	—	—		Non-album single
"Strip" (Little Mix featuring Sharaya J)	2018	25	—	—	—	—	—	—	—	—	—		LM5
"Told You So" (Little Mix)	2018	83	—	—	—	—	—	—	—	—	—		LM5
"Play" (Jax Jones and Years & Years)	2018	8	—	13	—	—	—	22	—	—	—	BPI: Gold	Snacks (Supersize)
"Swan Song" (Dua Lipa)	2019	24	68	50	—	99	1	5	96	67	—		Alita: Battle Angel OST
"I Could Get Used to This" (Becky Hill and Weiss)	2019	45	—	—	—	—	—	—	—	—	—	BPI: Silver	Get to Know
"Blow My Mind" (Sabina Ddumba featuring Mr Eazi)	2019	—	—	—	—	—	—	—	—	75	—		The Forgotten Ones
"Jacques" (Jax Jones and Tove Lo)	2019	67	—	49	—	—	—	—	—	61	—		Snacks (Supersize)
"This Is Real" (Jax Jones and Ella Henderson)	2019	9	—	—	—	—	26	—	—	—	—	BPI: Gold	Snacks (Supersize)
"Loneliest Time of Year" (Mabel)	2019	—	—	11	—	—	—	—	—	78	—		Non-album single
"Tequila" (Jax Jones, Martin Solveig and Raye)	2020	21	—	—	—	—	—	32	—	—	—	BPI: Silver	Non-album single
"Mistakes" (Jonas Blue and Paloma Faith)	2020	—	—	—	—	—	—	35	—	—	—		Est. 1989
"More & More" (Twice)	2020	—	—	—	—	—	—	12	—	—	—		More & More EP
"Heaven on My Mind" (Becky Hill and Sigala)	2020	14	—	—	—	—	—	—	—	—	—	BPI: Silver	Only Honest on The Weekend
"Head & Heart" (Joel Corry featuring MNEK)	2020	1	2	1	11	4	2	5	4	4	99	BPI: Gold; ARIA: Platinum; BEA: Gold; BVMI: Gold; FIMI: Gold; IFPI AUT: Gold; MC: Gold; RMNZ: Gold	Another Friday Night
"Really Love" (KSI featuring Craig David and Digital Farm Animals)	2020	3	—	—	—	—	—	—	—	—	—	BPI: Silver	All Over the Place
"Sweet Melody" (Little Mix)	2020	1	—	9	—	—	2	—	83	—	—	BPI: Silver	Confetti
"Confetti" (Little Mix or featuring Saweetie)	2020	9	—	34	—	—	—	—	—	—	—		Confetti
"Happiness" (Little Mix)	2020	43	—	—	—	—	—	—	—	—	—		Confetti
"Not a Pop Song" (Little Mix)	2020	49	—	—	—	—	—	—	—	—	—		Confetti
"No Time for Tears" (Nathan Dawe and Little Mix)	2020	19	—	—	—	—	—	—	—	—	—	BPI: Silver	Non-album single
"Way Too Long" (Nathan Dawe, Anne-Marie and MoStack)	2021	37	—	—	—	—	—	—	—	—	—	BPI: Silver	Therapy
"Let Them Know" (Mabel)	2021	19	—	—	—	—	—	—	—	—	—	BPI: Silver	About Last Night...
"Love (Sweet Love)" (Little Mix)	2021	33	—	—	—	—	—	—	—	—	—		Between Us
"I Wish" (Joel Corry featuring Mabel)	2021	17	—	—	—	—	—	—	—	—	—	BPI: Gold	Another Friday Night
"No" (Little Mix)	2021	35	—	—	—	—	—	—	—	—	—		Between Us
"Where Did You Go?" (Jax Jones featuring MNEK)	2022	7	40	7	—	27	20	—	45	—	—	BPI: x2 Platinum; ARIA: Platinum; BEA: Gold; BVMI: Gold; RMNZ: Platinum; IFPI DEN: Platinum; FIMI: Platinum; PMB: Gold; SNEP: Gold; ZPAV: x2 Platinum	Non-album single
"Run" (Becky Hill and Galantis)	2022	21	—	45	—	—	92	—	—	—	—	BPI: Gold	Only Honest on The Weekend: Deluxe Edition
"Good Luck" (Mabel, Jax Jones and Galantis)	2022	45	—	—	—	—	—	—	—	—	—		About Last Night...
"What Would You Do?" (Joel Corry, David Guetta and Bryson Tiller)	2022	21	—	—	—	—	30	—	—	—	—	BPI: Gold	Another Friday Night
"The Loneliest" (Maneskin)	2022	—	—	12	37	82	30	—	13	48	—	FIMI: x3 Platinum; SNEP: Diamond; BEA: Platinum; PMB: x2 Platinum; ZPAV: Platinum; IFPI SWI: Gold; IFPI AUT: Gold	Rush!
"Sweet Lies" (Nathan Dawe and Talia Mar)	2022	61	—	—	—	—	—	—	—	—	—		Non-album single
"Can't Tame Her" (Zara Larsson)	2023	25	—	—	7	—	—	—	—	5	—	BPI: Gold; IFPI NOR: x2 Platinum; IFPI SWI: Gold; IFPI AUT: Gold; ZPAV: Gold; GLF: Platinum; IFPI DEN: Platinum	Venus
"Fly Girl" (Flo featuring Missy Elliott)	2023	38	—	—	—	—	—	—	—	—	—		Non-album single
"Side Effects" (Becky Hill and Lewis Thompson)	2023	35	—	—	—	—	—	—	—	—	—	BPI: Silver	Believe Me Now?
"You Love Who You Love" (Zara Larsson)	2024	—	—	—	28	—	—	—	—	8	—		Venus
"Pretty Ugly" (Zara Larsson)	2025	—	—	—	61	—	—	—	—	14	—		Midnight Sun
"Midnight Sun" (Zara Larsson)	2025	12	34	50	32	—	20	28	—	4	39	BPI: Silver; BEA: Gold; RMNZ: Gold; MC: Platinum; AFP: Gold	Midnight Sun
"Plastic Box" (Jade)	2025	44	—	—	—	—	—	—	—	—	—		That's Showbiz Baby
"Crush" (Zara Larsson)	2025	—	—	—	56	—	—	—	—	32	—		Midnight Sun
"Blue Moon" (Zara Larsson)	2025	—	—	—	—	—	—	—	—	16	—		Midnight Sun
"Girl's Girl" (Zara Larsson)	2025	—	—	—	—	—	—	—	—	98	—		Midnight Sun
"Eurosummer" (Zara Larsson)	2025	—	—	—	—	—	—	—	—	84	—		Midnight Sun
"Hot & Sexy" (Zara Larsson)	2025	—	—	—	—	—	—	—	—	25	—		Midnight Sun
"Stateside (Remix)" (PinkPantheress and Zara Larsson)	2025	—	3	—	7	—	—	—	—	3	6	ARIA: Platinum	Fancy Some More?

== Songs written and produced by MNEK ==
Year	Artist	Song	Album	Ref.
2011	Florrie	"Experimenting with Rugs"	Experiments EP	
2011	Florrie	"Speed of Light"	Experiments EP	
2011	Florrie	"I Took a Little Something"	Experiments EP	
2011	The Saturdays	"All Fired Up"	On Your Radar	
2011	The Wanted	"I'll Be Your Strength"	Battleground	
2011	The Saturdays	"Get Ready, Get Set"	On Your Radar	
2012	A*M*E	"City Lights" feat. Bartoven	Non-album single	
2012	Rudimental	"Spoons" feat. MNEK and Syron	Home	
2012	A*M*E	"Ride or Die"	Non-album single	
2012	Florrie	"Shot You Down"	Late EP	
2012	Florrie	"Every Inch"	Late EP	
2012	Misha B	"Home Run"	Non-album single	
2012	Jack Beats	"Fast Girls" feat. MNEK	Careless EP	
2012	JLS	"Hottest Girl in the World"	Evolution	
2013	Duke Dumont	"Need U (100%)" feat. A*M*E	Non-album single	
2013	Rudimental	"Baby" feat. MNEK and Sinead Harnett	Home	
2013	Rudimental	"Hell Could Freeze" feat. Angel Haze	Home	
2013	Rudimental	"Hide" feat. Sinead Harnett	Home	
2013	DEVolution	"Admire" feat. Aaron Soul	Transition EP	
2013	Colette Carr	"The Finest Things"	Skitszo	
2013	DEVolution	"Too Much Heaven" feat. MNEK	Transition EP	
2013	Naughty Boy	"Pardon Me" feat. Tanika and Ava Stokes	Hotel Cabana	
2013	Javeon	"Lovesong"	Non-album single	
2013	Tanika	"Bad 4 U"	Fucking with My Heart EP	
2013	Maxsta	"Wanna Go" feat. Little Nikki	Non-album single	
2013	Sub Focus	"Close" feat. MNEK	Torus	
2013	Tom Aspaul	"Indiana"	Non-album single	
2013	Little Mix	"Nothing Feels Like You"	Salute	
2014	Gorgon City	"Ready for Your Love" feat. MNEK	Sirens	
2014	JY	"Radio"	Many Faces	
2014	JY	"I'm Just Not Into You"	Many Faces	
2014	Tensnake	"Pressure" feat. Thabo	Glow	
2014	Tensnake	"First Song"	Glow	
2014	Tensnake	"Last Song"	Glow	
2014	Kylie Minogue	"Feels So Good"	Kiss Me Once	
2014	Oliver Heldens	"Gecko (Overdrive)" with Becky Hill	Get to Know	
2014	Gorgon City	"Here for You" feat. Laura Welsh	Sirens	
2014	Alpines	"Blind"	Oasis	
2014	Alpines	"Sunset"	Oasis	
2014	Clean Bandit	"Cologne" feat. Nikki Cislyn and Javeon	New Eyes	
2014	Roses Gabor	"Rush"	Fantasy & Facts	
2014	Shadow Child	"Climbin' (Piano Weapon)" with Doorly	Non-album single	
2014	The Saturdays	"What Are You Waiting For?"	Finest Selection: The Greatest Hits	
2014	Bondax	"All I See" feat. Tanya Lacey	Non-album single	
2014	Neon Jungle	"London Rain"	Welcome to the Jungle	
2014	Bred for Pleasure	"Better Than This" feat. Aaron Soul	Non-album single	
2014	Billon	"Special" feat. Maxine Ashley	Non-album single	
2014	Karen Harding	"Say Something"	Take Me Somewhere	
2014	Tieks	"Sing That Song" feat. Celeste	Non-album single	
2014	Becky Hill	"Losing"	Non-album single	
2014	Paris Lover	"Feel Me" feat. A*M*E	Non-album single	
2014	Oliver Heldens	"Last All Night (Koala)" feat. KStewart	Non-album single	
2014	LuvBug	"Revive (Say Something)" feat. Mark Asari	Non-album single	
2015	Madonna	"Hold Tight"	Rebel Heart	
2015	Florrie	"Too Young to Remember"	Non-album single	
2015	Isaiah Dreads	"Foolish" feat. C4	Non-album single	
2015	Shy Luv	"Caught Up on You"	Caught Up on You EP	
2015	Leo Kalyan	"Fingertips"	Silver Linings EP	
2015	Rudimental	"Rumour Mill" feat. Anne-Marie and Will Heard	We the Generation	
2015	Duke Dumont	"The Giver (Reprise)"	Non-album single	
2015	Etta Bond	"18"	Non-album single	
2015	Leo Kalyan	"Silver Linings"	Silver Livings EP	
2015	Blonde	"Feel Good (It's Alright)" feat. Karen Harding	Non-album single	
2015	Brayton Bowman	"Skin Deep"	The Update EP	
2015	Brayton Bowman	"Real"	The Update EP	
2015	Brayton Bowman	"Play Me"	The Update EP	
2015	Brayton Bowman	"Side" feat. Donna Missal	The Update EP	
2015	Rudimental	"We the Generation" feat. Mahalia	We the Generation	
2015	Rudimental	"Common Emotion" feat. MNEK	We the Generation	
2015	Rudimental	"Foreign World" feat. Anne-Marie	We the Generation	
2015	EDX	"Belong"	Non-album single	
2015	Special Request	"Simulation"	Modern Warfare (EPs 1-3)	
2016	KStewart	"Be Without You"	Non-album single	
2016	Alex Newell	"Basically Over You (B.O.Y.)"	Power EP	
2016	MK	"Piece of Me" with Becky Hill	Get to Know	
2016	Beyonce	"Hold Up"	Lemonade	
2016	MØ	"Final Song"	Forever Neverland	
2016	Lee Walker	"Freak Like Me" with DJ Deeon feat. Katy B and MNEK	Non-album single	
2016	Matoma	"False Alarm" with Becky Hill	One in a Million	
2016	WSTRN	"Social" solo or feat. MoStack	Non-album single	
2016	Jax Jones	"House Work" feat. Mike Dunn and MNEK	Snacks (Supersize)	
2016	Shift K3Y	"Natural" feat. KStewart	Nit3 Tales	
2016	Conor Maynard	"This Is My Version"	Covers	
2016	Zara Larsson	"Ain't My Fault"	So Good	
2016	Nat Conway	"Everybody's Free"	Non-album single	
2016	Brayton Bowman	"What's Really Good?"	22 Minutes Later	
2016	JKAY	"Danger" feat. Shola Ama	Non-album single	
2016	Craig David	"Change My Love"	Following My Intuition	
2016	IV Rox	"I Heard Love" feat. Majestic	Non-album single	
2016	Kaiser Chiefs	"Press Rewind"	Stay Together	
2016	Leo Kalyan	"Silhouette"	Non-album single	
2016	My Digital Enemy	"Inside of Me"	Non-album single	
2016	JoJo	"Good Thing"	Mad Love	
2016	Becky Hill	"Warm"	Eko EP	
2016	Far East Movement	"SXWME" feat. Jay Park and MNEK	Identity	
2016	Sabina Ddumba	"Time"	Homeward Bound	
2016	Tom Aspaul	"Messy"	Left EP	
2016	MK	"My Love 4 U" feat. A*M*E	Non-album single	
2016	Shift K3Y	"No Question" feat. Ryan Ashley and MNEK	Nit3 Tales	
2016	Olly Murs	"Private"	24Hrs	
2016	Little Mix	"Touch" solo or feat. Kid Ink	Glory Days	
2016	Brayton Bowman	"Puff Puff Pass"	22 Minutes Later	
2016	Jax Jones	"You Don't Know Me" feat. Raye	Snacks (Supersize)	
2017	Tchami	"World to Me" feat. MNEK or Luke James	Revelations EP	
2017	The Knocks	"Worship" feat. MNEK	Testify EP	
2017	Monsieur Adi	"Stay Up Late" feat. Red	Non-album single	
2017	Brayton Bowman	"Worry Too Much (Intro)"	22 Minutes Later	
2017	Brayton Bowman	"WTF (Interlude)"	22 Minutes Later	
2017	Brayton Bowman	"The Second I'm Rich"	22 Minutes Later	
2017	Brayton Bowman	"Kustom Made"	22 Minutes Later	
2017	Brayton Bowman	"Broke n' Down (Interlude)"	22 Minutes Later	
2017	Brayton Bowman	"Feel You"	22 Minutes Later	
2017	Stormzy	"Blinded by Your Grace, Pt. 2" feat. MNEK	Gang Signs & Prayer	
2017	Riton	"Money" feat. Kah-Lo and Mr Eazi	Foreign Ororo	
2017	Frost	"On My Mind" feat. Leo Kalyan	Non-album single	
2017	Pell	"Late at Night" feat. MNEK	Patience	
2017	Zara Larsson	"What They Say"	So Good	
2017	Becky Hill	"Rude Love"	Eko EP	
2017	Tinie Tempah	"Not for the Radio" feat. MNEK	Youth	
2017	Sub Focus	"Don't You Feel It" feat. Alma	Non-album single	
2017	Dua Lipa	"IDGAF"	Dua Lipa	
2017	5 After Midnight	"Up in Here"	Non-album single	
2017	Katie Price	“I Got U |		
2017	Jax Jones	"Instruction" feat. Demi Lovato and Stefflon Don	Snacks (Supersize)	
2017	Marc E. Bassy	"Plot Twist" feat. Kyle	Gossip Columns	
2017	Sweater Beats	"Glory Days" feat. Hayley Kiyoko	For the Cold EP	
2017	Becky Hill	"Unpredictable"	Eko EP	
2017	Anne-Marie	"Heavy"	Speak Your Mind	
2017	Jolan	"Patient"	Patient EP	
2017	H.E.R.	"2"	H.E.R.	
2017	Mic Lowry	"No Problem"	Mood EP	
2017	Sub Focus	"Love Divine" feat. Moko	Non-album single	
2017	Jax Jones	"Breathe" feat. Ina Wroldsen	Snacks (Supersize)	
Le Youth	"I Could Always" feat. MNDR	Non-album single		
2018	Burna Boy	"Outside" feat. Mabel	Outside	
2018	Julia Michaels	"Heaven"	Fifty Shades Freed OST	
2018	Metroplane	"Word of Mouth" feat. Bree Runway	Non-album single	
2018	Thirdstory	"Only Love"	Cold Heart	
2018	Ryan Ashley	"Chest"	Innocent EP	
2018	Todd Edwards	"Is It Wrong?" with Billon	Non-album single	
2018	Ghosted	"Feel on Me" feat. JHart	Non-album single	
2018	Kara Marni	"Love Just Ain't Enough"	Love Just Ain't Enough EP	
2018	BTS	"낙원 (Paradise)"	Love Yourself: Tear	
2018	Throttle	"All In"	Non-album single	
2018	Christina Aguilera	"Deserve"	Liberation	
2018	Jax Jones	"Ring Ring" feat. Mabel and Rich the Kid	Snacks (Supersize)	
2018	Crazy Cousinz	"Feelings (Wifey)" feat. M.O and Yungen	Non-album single	
2018	Shift K3Y	"Entirety" feat. A*M*E	Non-album single	
2018	Gorgon City	"Kingdom" feat. Raphaella	Escape	
2018	MK	"Back & Forth" with Jonas Blue and Becky Hill	Get to Know	
2018	James Hype	"No Drama" feat. Craig David	Non-album single	
2018	Oscar Scheller	"Runaway" feat. Tiffi	HTTP404 EP	
2018	Ryan Ashley	"Care for You"	Innocent EP	
2018	Little Mix	"Strip" feat. Sharaya J	LM5	
2018	Little Mix	"Told You So"	LM5	
2018	Little Mix	"Wasabi"	LM5	
2018	Leo Kalyan	"The Edge"	The Edge EP	
2018	Leo Kalyan	"Horizon"	The Edge EP	
2018	Leo Kalyan	"Qandeel Baloch"	The Edge EP	
2018	Boston Bun	"Better Together"	Non-album single	
2018	Jax Jones	"Play" with Years & Years	Snacks (Supersize)	
2018	Clean Bandit	"In Us I Believe" feat. Alma	What Is Love?	
2019	Dua Lipa	"Swan Song"	Alita: Battle Angel OST	
2019	Lion Babe	"Reminisce"	Cosmic Wind	
2019	Becky Hill	"I Could Get Used to This" with Weiss	Get to Know	
2019	Rak-Su	"Yours or Mine"	Non-album single	
2019	Twice	"Girls Like Us"	Fancy You EP	
2019	Leo Kalyan	"The Road"	Non-album single	
2019	Sabina Ddumba	"Blow My Mind" feat. Mr Eazi	The Forgotten Ones	
2019	Ryan Ashley	"Innocent" feat. Kate Stewart	Innocent EP	
2019	Nadine Coyle	"Fool for Love"	Non-album single	
2019	Jax Jones	"One Touch" with Jess Glynne	Snacks (Supersize)	
2019	Matoma	"Bruised Not Broken" feat. MNEK and Kiana Lede	Non-album single	
2019	VanJess	"Through Enough" (Remix) feat. MNEK	Non-album single	
2019	Boston Bun	"Don't Wanna Dance"	Non-album single	
2019	Years & Years	"American Boy"	Non-album single	
2019	Ryan Ashley	"Guess My Friends Were Right"	Innocent EP	
2019	Ryan Ashley	"Forever Anyway"	Innocent EP	
2019	Kabba	"Glue" feat. Bartoven	Kabba EP	
2019	Kate Stewart	"Get Mine"	Non-album single	
2019	Mabel	"OK (Anxiety Anthem)"	High Expectations	
2019	Leo Kalyan	"Time Can Wait"	Non-album single	
2019	Bat for Lashes	"Safe Tonight"	Lost Girls	
2019	Jax Jones	"100 Times"	Snacks (Supersize)	
2019	Jax Jones	"Cruel"	Snacks (Supersize)	
2019	Jax Jones	"This is Real" with Ella Henderson	Snacks (Supersize)	
2019	Adam Lambert	"Overglow"	Velvet	
2019	Becky Hill	"Find a Place" feat. MNEK	Get to Know	
2019	Becky Hill	"Stranger"	Get to Know	
2019	Sam Tompkins	"Critical"	From My Sleeve to the World EP	
2019	Ryan Ashley	"Familiar"	Non-album single	
2019	Kabba	"My Work is Done"	Kabba EP	
2019	MistaJam	"Ultimatum" feat. Laura White	Non-album single	
2019	Mabel	"Loneliest Time of Year"	Non-album single	
2019	Pete Tong	"Perfect Harmony" with HER-O feat. MNEK	Chilled Classics	
2019	Kate Stewart	"High" feat. Jevon	Non-album single	
2020	Selena Gomez	"A Sweeter Place" feat. Kid Cudi	Rare	
2020	Kabba	"Muscle"	Kabba EP	
2020	Kabba	"Whatever"	Kabba EP	
2020	Kabba	"Bridges" feat. MNEK	Kabba EP	
2020	Kabba	"Rope (Interlude)"	Kabba EP	
2020	Kabba	"Rope"	Kabba EP	
2020	Jax Jones	"Tequila" with Martin Solveig and Raye	Non-album single	
2020	Jonas Blue	"Mistakes" with Paloma Faith	Est. 1989	
2020	Selena Gomez	"She"	Rare: Deluxe Edition	
2020	Armand van Helden	"Power of Bass" with Solardo and Herve	Non-album single	
2020	Twice	"More & More"	More & More EP	
2020	Midas Hutch	"Freeze" feat. Ryan Ashley	Non-album single	
2020	Becky Hill	"Heaven on My Mind" with Sigala	Only Honest on the Weekend	
2020	Joel Corry	"Head & Heart" feat. MNEK	Four to the Floor EP	
2020	Jamie Miller	"City That Never Sleeps"	Non-album single	
2020	Pia Mia	"Hot" solo or feat. Flo Milli and Sean Paul	Non-album single	
2020	Hrvy	"Good Vibes" with Matoma	Non-album single	
2020	Dua Lipa	"Love Is Religion"	Club Future Nostalgia	
2020	Chris Malinchak	"Happiness" feat. Damon C Scott	Night Work	
2020	Ella Henderson	"Dream on Me" with Roger Sanchez	Non-album single	
2020	Little Mix	"Not a Pop Song"	Confetti	
2020	Sleepwalkrs	"More Than Words" feat. MNEK	Non-album single	
2020	Little Mix	"Happiness"	Confetti	
2020	KSI	"Really Love" feat. Craig David and Digital Farm Animals	All Over the Place	
2020	Little Mix	"Sweet Melody"	Confetti	
2020	Twice	"Handle It"	Eyes Wide Open	
2020	Little Mix	"Confetti" solo or feat. Saweetie	Confetti	
2020	Jarreau Vandal	"Obsessive"	Superb Superhero: The Villain Within	
2020	Taemin	"유인 (Impressionable)"	Never Gonna Dance Again: Act 2	
2020	Amun	"Done Me"	Non-album single	
2020	Paloma Faith	"Monster"	Infinite Things	
2020	Steps	"To the Beat of My Heart"	What the Future Holds	
2020	Nathan Dawe	"No Time for Tears" with Little Mix	Non-album single	
2020	Rak-Su	"No Contest"	Finally Free Mixtape	
2021	Dua Lipa	"If It Ain't Me"	Future Nostalgia: Moonlight Edition	
2021	MistaJam	"Good" feat. Kelli-Leigh	Non-album single	
2021	Tiana Blake	"Interruption"	Non-album single	
2021	CL	"Wish You Were Here"	Non-album single	
2021	Nathan Dawe	"Way Too Long" with Anne-Marie and MoStack	Therapy	
2021	Tom Aspaul	"Traces" (Remix) feat. MNEK	Black Country Discotheque	
2021	Sam Sparro	"Melody of Us"	Boombox Eternal: Halcyon Deluxe Edition	
2021	Boston Bun	"Love U Better"	There's a Nightclub Inside My Mind	
2021	Tunji Ige	"Too Cool"	Non-album single	
2021	Dillon Francis	"Unconditional" with 220 Kid feat. Bryn Christopher	Happy Machine	
2021	Vize Verza	"Ocean"	Non-album single	
2021	Raleigh Ritchie	"I'm Not Okay, But I Know I'm Going to Be"	Non-album single	
2021	Mabel	"Let Them Know"	About Last Night...	
2021	Chris Malinchak	"In My Eyes" feat. Kiesza	Night Work	
2021	NCT Dream	"Life Is Still Going On"	Hello Future	
2021	Amorphous	"Finally (Cannot Hide It)" with Kelly Rowland and CeCe Peniston	Things Take Shape EP	
2021	Mahalia	"Whenever You're Ready"	Non-album single	
2021	Darkoo	"Come Up" feat. Unknown T	2 in 1	
2021	Anne-Marie	"Unlovable" feat. Rudimental	Therapy	
2021	Anne-Marie	"Better Not Together"	Therapy	
2021	Kabba	"Rather Be Single"	Not to Self EP	
2021	Becky Hill	"Business" with Ella Eyre	Only Honest on the Weekend	
2021	Becky Hill	"Make It Hard to Love You"	Only Honest on the Weekend	
2021	Becky Hill	"Is Anybody There?"	Only Honest on the Weekend	
2021	Becky Hill	"Through the Night" with 220 Kid	Only Honest on the Weekend	
2021	Little Mix	"Love (Sweet Love)"	Between Us	
2021	Becky Hill	"Everything"	Everybody's Talking About Jamie OST	
2021	Ray BLK	"BLK Madonna"	Access Denied	
2021	Ray BLK	"Go-go Girl" feat. Suburban Plaza	Access Denied	
2021	Billy Porter	"Children"	Black Mona Lisa	
2021	Kabba	"Mood"	Note to Self EP	
2021	Honne	"Easy on Me"	LJSTWEAWFNWWYD?	
2021	Kabba	"Hickie"	Note to Self EP	
2021	Kabba	"Stronger Stuff"	Note to Self EP	
2021	Kabba	"R&B Dreams" feat. Dionne Bromfield	Note to Self EP	
2021	Joel Corry	"I Wish" feat. Mabel	Another Friday Night	
2021	Little Mix	"Between Us"	Between Us	
2021	Little Mix	"No"	Between Us	
2021	Little Mix	"Trash"	Between Us	
2021	Leigh-Anne	"Woman"	Boxing Day OST	
2022	Jax Jones	"Where Did You Go?" feat. MNEK	Non-album single	
2022	Becky Hill	"Run" with Galantis	Only Honest On The Weekend: Deluxe Edition	
2022	Mabel	"Good Luck" with Jax Jones and Galantis	About Last Night...	
2022	Joel Corry	"What Would You Do?" with David Guetta feat. Bryson Tiller	Another Friday Night	
2022	Tom Aspaul	"What Is Real Anymore?"	Life in Plastic	
2022	Tieks	"The Funk" with MNEK	Non-album single	
2022	Tom Aspaul	"Thessaloniki"	Life in Plastic	
2022	Tom Aspaul	"Millionaire"	Life in Plastic	
2022	Sigma	"Strong" with Kovic	Hope	
2022	Zach Campbell	"Away From You"	Non-album single	
2022	Nayeon	"No Problem"	I'm Nayeon - EP	
2022	Aespa	"Life's Too Short"	Girls - EP	
2022	Mabel	"Let Love Go" with Lil Tecca	About Last Night...	
2022	Flo	"Cardboard Box"	The Lead EP	
2022	Flo	"Immature"	The Lead EP	
2022	Flo	"Not My Job"	The Lead EP	
2022	Flo	"Summertime"	The Lead EP	
2022	Flo	"Feature Me"	The Lead EP	
2022	Mabel	"About Last Night (Intro)"	About Last Night...	
2022	Mabel	"Shy"	About Last Night...	
2022	Mabel	"Definition"	About Last Night...	
2022	Mabel	"When The Party's Over"	About Last Night...	
2022	Craig David	"DNA" with Galantis	22	
2022	Manny Norte	"Worth My While" with Tiana Major9, Stalk Ashley and Ayra Starr	Non-album single	
2022	Ari Lennox	"Waste My Time"	Age/Sex/Location	
2022	Kito	"Sad Girl Music" feat. Banks	Non-album single	
2022	Ayra Starr	"Bloody Samaritan (Remix)" with Kelly Rowland	19 & Dangerous: Deluxe Edition	
2022	Blue	"Heart & Soul"	Heart & Soul	
2022	Maneskin	"The Loneliest"	Rush!	
2022	Nathan Dawe	"Sweet Lies" with Talia Mar	Non-album single	
2022	Leo Kalyan	"Diamond Life" feat. MNEK	Non-album single	
2022	Kate Stewart	"London Town"	Non-album single	
2022	Freedo	"Enough" with Raphaella	Non-album single	
2022	Zac Samuel	"Care At All"	Non-album single	
2022	&Team	"Scent of You"	First Howling: ME - EP	
2022	Flo	"Losing You"	Non-album single	
2022	Sugababes	"Drum"	The Lost Tapes	
2022	Sugababes	"Boys"	The Lost Tapes	
2022	Sugababes	"Today"	The Lost Tapes	
2023	Zara Larsson	"Can't Tame Her"	Venus	
2023	Ava Max	"Ghost"	Diamonds & Dancefloors	
2023	Vincint	"Romance"	Non-album single	
2023	Flo	"Fly Girl" feat. Missy Elliott	Non-album single	
2023	Leo Kalyan	"Chalo Chalo"	Non-album single	
2023	Becky Hill	"Side Effects" with Lewis Thompson	Believe Me Now?	
2023	Louise	"Right Now"	Greatest Hits + Reimagined	
2023	Mahalia	"Cheat" feat. JoJo	IRL	
2023	Kash Doll	"Ridin'"	Non-album single	
2023	Kiss of Life	"Sugarcoat" (NATTY Solo)	Kiss of Life EP	
2023	Flo	"Control Freak"	3 of Us EP	
2023	Flo	"Change"	3 of Us EP	
2023	Flo	"3 of Us"	3 of Us EP	
2023	Flo	"Suite Life (Familiar)"	3 of Us EP: Reissue	
2023	Debbie	"No Way"	Non-album single	
2023	Dopamine	"Feel It Deep Inside" with Sigala	Non-album single	
2023	Karen Harding	"Take Me Somewhere"	Take Me Somewhere	
2023	Jini	"Bad Reputation"	An Iron Hand in a Velvet Glove EP	
2023	Joel Corry	"Another Friday Night"	Another Friday Night	
2023	Billy Porter	"Children (What Time It Is)" feat. Lady Blackbird	Black Mona Lisa	
2023	Teni	"YBGFA"	Tears of the Sun	
2023	Billy Porter	"Not Ashamed"	Black Mona Lisa	
2024	Zara Larsson	"You Love Who You Love"	Venus	
2024	Tyler Lewis	"Downtime"	Wait 'til She Gets Her Heart Broken EP	
2024	Flo	"Walk Like This"	Access All Areas	
2024	The Indien	"How Many Nights"	The Indien	
2024	Tyler Lewis	"Fly On The Wall"	Wait 'til She Gets Her Heart Broken EP	
2024	TXT	"I'll See You There Tomorrow"	Minisode 3: Tomorrow	
2024	Zach Campbell	"High"	Midnight Bodies EP	
2024	Becky Hill	"True Colours" with Self Esteem	Believe Me Now?	
2024	Flo	"Caught Up"	Access All Areas	
2024	Becky Hill	"Darkest Hour"	Believe Me Now?	
2024	Becky Hill	"Multiply"	Believe Me Now?	
2024	Becky Hill	"Lonely Again"	Believe Me Now?	
2024	Becky Hill	"Keep Holding On"	Believe Me Now?	
2024	Becky Hill	"One Track Mind" feat. Rileasea	Believe Me Now?	
2024	Florrie	"I Took A Little Something (2024 Version)"	The Lost Ones	
2024	Kamille	"Freak"	Non-album single	
2024	Kyle Dion	"BRB"	Non-album single	
2024	Tyler Lewis	"People Watching"	Wait 'til She Get Her Heart Broken EP	
2024	Tyler Lewis	"Under The Rug"	Wait 'til She Get Her Heart Broken EP	
2024	Tyler Lewis	"Never Been in Love"	Wait 'til She Get Her Heart Broken EP	
2024	Flo	"Check"	Access All Areas	
2024	Kehlani	"8 (Remix)" feat. Flo	While We Wait 2	
2024	Flo	"Bending My Rules"	Access All Areas	
2024	Flo	"AAA"	Access All Areas	
2024	Flo	"Intro" feat. Cynthia Erivo	Access All Areas	
2024	Flo	"In My Bag" feat. GloRilla	Access All Areas	
2024	Flo	"How Does It Feel?"	Access All Areas	
2024	Flo	"Soft"	Access All Areas	
2024	Flo	"On & On"	Access All Areas	
2024	Flo	"Trustworthy (Interlude)"	Access All Areas	
2024	Flo	"IWH2BMX"	Access All Areas	
2024	Flo	"Nocturnal"	Access All Areas	
2024	Flo	"Shoulda Woulda Coulda"	Access All Areas	
2024	Flo	"Get It Till I'm Gone"	Access All Areas	
2024	Flo	"I'm Just a Girl"	Access All Areas	
2024	Flo	"Do Too Much"	Access All Areas	
2024	Flo	"Conceited"	Access All Areas	
2024	Flo	"Say Less"	Access All Areas	
2024	Flo	"Say Less (Unlocked)" feat. Chloe x Halle	Access All Areas: Unlocked	
2024	Flo	"Bending My Rules (Unlocked)" feat. Dixson	Access All Areas: Unlocked	
2024	Flo	"IWH2BMX (Unlocked)" feat. Kehlani	Access All Areas: Unlocked	
2024	Flo	"Nocturnal (Unlocked)" feat. Bree Runway	Access All Areas: Unlocked	
2026	XO	"Stacey (Take You Higher)"	Need to Know	
