= WEISS (musician) =

British musician

Richard Dinsdale, known as Weiss (stylized as WEISS), is a British music producer and DJ. His primary style of music is house. Dinsdale's musical influences include Motown, Metallica and Phil Collins. Dinsdale was notably an apprentice to Massive Attack's musical engineer James Day in his early career.

== Biography ==
In 2018, Weiss had his first successful single, "Feel My Needs" that went on to become a silver certified record in the UK. He then signed a record deal with Island Records in the UK and followed that up with "I Could Get Used to This", a collaboration with Becky Hill which went on to become gold certified. In 2020, Weiss released "First Sight" and "Where Do We Go".

In 2018, Weiss had an appearance at the Best of British Awards of DJ Magazine where he won the Best Single category for "Feel My Needs".

== Discography ==
=== Singles ===
- 2015: "Our Love"
- 2015: "The Light"
- 2015: "Get Em Funk"
- 2016: "You're Sunshine"
- 2016: "Rollin"
- 2016: "She Said"
- 2017: "Say It to Me" (with Christian Nielsen)
- 2018: "Feel My Needs"
- 2018: "Bergerac"
- 2018: "Chicken Dinner"
- 2019: "I Could Get Used to This" (with Becky Hill)
- 2019: "Let Me Love You"
- 2020: "First Sight"
- 2020: "Where Do We Go"
- 2022 "Ain't me without you"
