= Caution to the Wind =

Caution to the Wind may refer to:

== Albums ==
- Caution to the Wind, a 1988 album by Sherman Andrus
- Caution to the Wind, a 1995 album by Pura Fé
- Caution to the Wind, a 2000 album by Phil Cohen and Patricia Ford, see Jon Shain

== Songs ==
- "Caution to the Wind", a 1994 song by Elastic, now known as Euphoria
- "Caution to the Wind", a 2008 song by Anti-Flag from The Bright Lights of America
- "Caution to the Wind", a 2013 song by Becky Hill
- "Caution to the Wind", a song by GrooveLily from Striking 12
