= All My Love (Watermät, Becky Hill and Tai song) =

Single by Watermät, Becky Hill and Tai
- Released: 13 August 2015
- Recorded: 2014–2015
- Genre: House
- Length: 2:40
- Label: Polydor; Spinnin' Records
- Songwriters: Laurent Arriau; Rebecca Claire Hill; Karen Poole; Tai Jason; Mark Ralph
- Producers: Becky Hill; Watermät; Tai

Watermät singles chronology
"Portland" (2015)	"All My Love" (2015)	"Spherik" (2016)

Becky Hill singles chronology
"Losing" (2014)	"All My Love" (2015)	"Back to My Love" (2016)

"All My Love" is a song by French musical artist and record producer Watermät, British singer Becky Hill and Tai, released as a digital download on 13 August 2015 through Polydor and Spinnin' Records. It peaked at number 115 on the UK Singles Chart. The song was written by Laurent Arriau, Rebecca Claire Hill, Karen Poole, Tai Jason and Mark Ralph.

== Music video ==
A music video to accompany the release of "All My Love" was first released onto YouTube on 13 August 2015 at a total length of two minutes and forty-one seconds.

== Charts ==
Chart (2015)	Peak position
Belgium (Ultratip Bubbling Under Wallonia)	9
UK Singles (OCC)	115

== Release history ==
Region	Date	Format	Label
United Kingdom	13 August 2015	Digital download	Polydor; Spinnin'
