= Say Something (Sonny Fodera and Becky Hill song) =

2026 song by Sonny Fodera and Becky Hill

Single by Sonny Fodera and Becky Hill
- Released: 21 August 2026
- Length: 3:48
- Label: Solotoko
- Songwriters: Sonny Fodera; Becky Hill; Charlotte Haining; Karen Poole
- Producers: Sonny Fodera; Neave Applebaum; Punctual

Sonny Fodera singles chronology
"Feel Again" (2026)	"Say Something" (2026)

Becky Hill singles chronology
"What Do I Have to Do?" (2026)	"Say Something" (2026)	"Changes" (2026)

"Say Something" is a song by Australian electronic producer Sonny Fodera and British singer-songwriter Becky Hill. It was released on 21 August 2026 and follows on from the duo's 2024 collaboration "Never Be Alone". "Say Something" debuted at number 73 on the UK Singles Chart.

== Critical reception ==
InCeleb said "With her signature sound of electronic melodies, synth-pop beats and electronic dance music, Becky uplifts the energy with the help of music producer Sonny Fodera and lets her listeners let loose and enjoy their time on the dance floor or at home dancing away to her captivating sound."

Jo Forrest from Total Ntertainment said "Bringing together Sonny's signature house sound with Becky Hill's powerhouse vocals and unmistakable energy, 'Say Something' is a high-energy release that showcases both artists at their best."

For the week commencing 7 September 2026, it was The Music magazine's "power pick". (Note: A "power pick" is an Australian song chosen by magazine staff they think has the potential to be the next big Australian chart hit.) Mary Varvaris said "Containing fascinating grooves, standout vocals and an undeniable summer feel, 'Say Something' unites Fodera and Hill for a dancefloor-ready anthem." The Hot Hits' Nic Kelly said "Becky's powerhouse vocal meets Sonny's euphoric, building production in a song that's energetic, emotional and instantly addictive. It's built to be played loud - exactly the kind of Australian record we want to champion."

== Track listing ==
- Digital download / streaming
1. "Say Something" – 3:44
- Digital download / streaming
1. "Say Something" (extended) – 5:30

== Charts ==
=== Weekly charts ===
Weekly chart performance
Chart (2026)	Peak position
Australia Airplay (RCS)	9
Australian Artist Dance Singles (ARIA)	18
Belarus Airplay (TopHit)	154
Czech Republic Airplay (ČNS IFPI)	10
Estonia Airplay (TopHit)	64
Latvia Airplay (LaIPA)	18
Lithuania Airplay (TopHit)	112
New Zealand Hot Singles (RMNZ)	13
New Zealand Airplay (RCS)	24
UK Singles (Official Charts)	73
UK Dance (Official Charts)	20
US Dance Airplay (Billboard)	7

=== Monthly charts ===
Monthly chart performance
Chart (2026)	Peak position
Latvia Airplay (TopHit)	94
