= Losing (Becky Hill song) =

Single by Becky Hill
- Released: 7 November 2014
- Length: 3:54
- Label: Parlophone
- Songwriter(s): Rebecca Hill; Uzoechi Emeniki
- Producer(s): MNEK

Becky Hill singles chronology
| "Caution to the Wind" (2014) | "Losing" (2014) | "All My Love" (2015) |

Music video
- "Losingy" on YouTube

"Losing" is a song by English singer Becky Hill, released on 7 November 2014.

In an interview with Nylon, Hill said the song was inspired by someone she was seeing. "I was very reluctant to trust him after a traumatic relationship when I was 16 but this person made me feel I could trust him. Our relationship was very intense and we relied on each other for guidance. It was all lies though, as he completely stopped any sort of contact. I was fed up of being let down and left heartbroken and thus 'Losing' was born out of that frustration."

In 2015, the song was nominated for Popjustice £20 Music Prize.

== Track listings ==
1 track single
| No. | Title | Length |
|---|---|---|
| 1. | "Losing" | 3:54 |

remixes
| No. | Title | Length |
|---|---|---|
| 1. | "Losing" | 3:54 |
| 2. | "Losing" (Joe Goddard remix) | 5:42 |
| 3. | "Losing" (Grades remix) | 5:33 |
| 4. | "Losing" (Reso remix) | 4:55 |
| 5. | "Losing" (Icarus remix) | 4:06 |

== Charts ==
Weekly chart performance for "Losing"
| Chart (2014) | Peak position |
|---|---|
| UK Singles (OCC) | 56 |
