= Watermät =

French musical artist and record producer

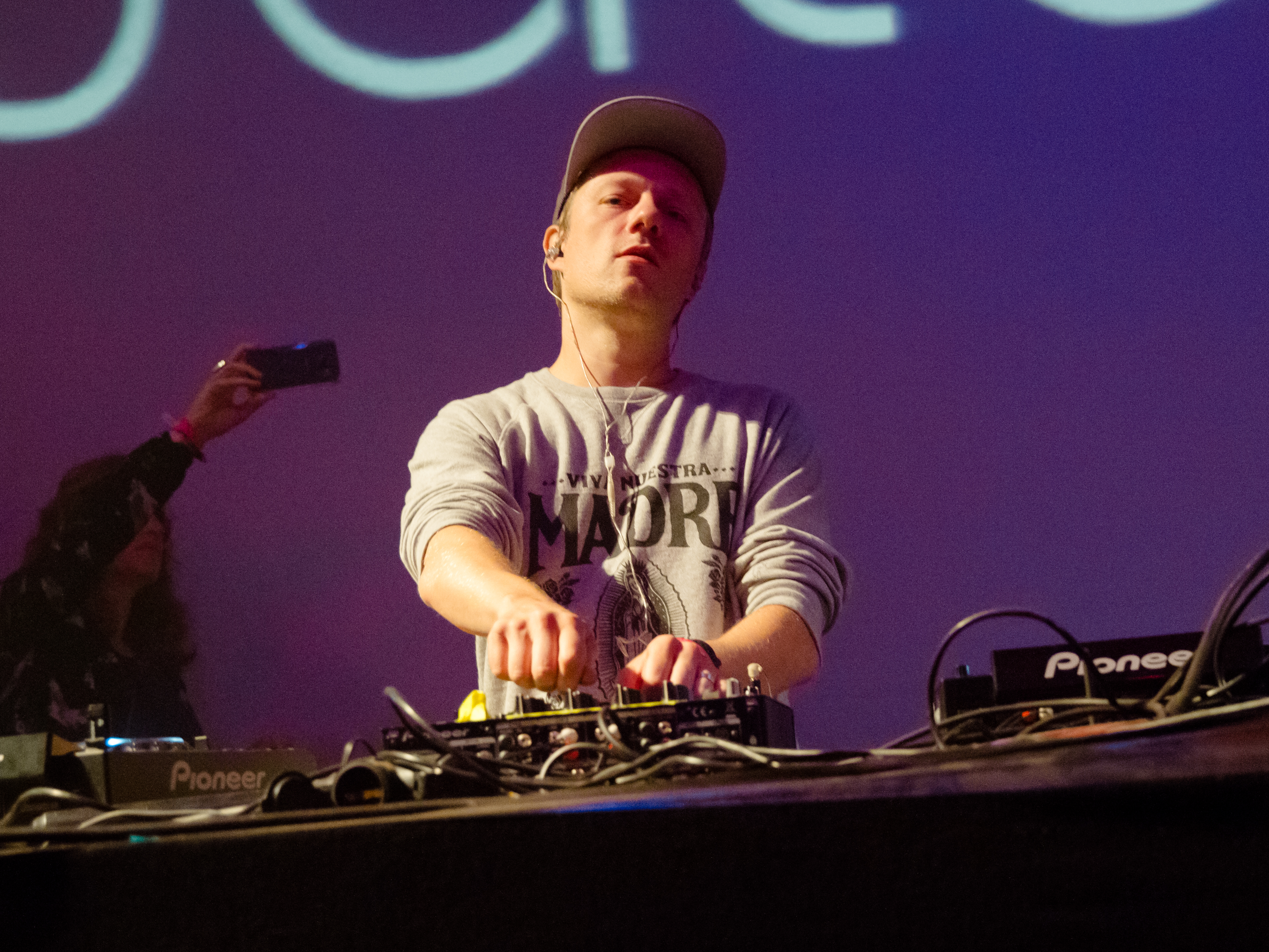

Background information
- Also known as: Laurent Konrad
- Born: Laurent Arriau; Paris, France
- Origin: Soorts-Hossegor
- Genres: Deep house; tech house
- Occupations: Disc jockey, record producer, musician
- Instruments: Keyboards, turntable
- Years active: 2013–present
- Labels: Spinnin' Records, WÄ Recordings

Laurent Arriau (French pronunciation: [lɔʁɑ̃ aʁjo]), known by his stage name Watermät, is a French DJ, musician and record producer, based in Soorts-Hossegor. His 2014 single "Bullit" appeared on the charts in Belgium, France, the Netherlands, Australia and the UK.

== Discography ==
=== Singles ===
Title	Year	Peak positions						Album
Title	Year	FRA	AUS	BEL (Fl)	NLD	UK	UK Dance	Album
"Bullit"	2014	66	60	2	25	15	4	Non-album singles
"Frequency" (with TAI)	2015	93	—	60	—	—	—	Non-album singles
"Portland" (with Moguai)	2015	—	—	—	—	—	—	Non-album singles
"All My Love" (with Becky Hill & TAI; vocal version of "Frequency")	2015	—	—	59	—	115	—	Non-album singles
"Spherik"	2016	—	—	—	—	—	—	Non-album singles
"Empire"	2016	—	—	—	—	—	—	Non-album singles
"Fade"	2016	—	—	—	—	—	—	Non-album singles
"Won't Stop" (featuring Kelli-Leigh)	2017	—	—	—	—	—	—	Non-album singles
"Ruff Like This" (with Pep & Rash)	2017	—	—	—	—	—	—	Non-album singles
"Need U"	2018	—	—	—	—	—	—	Non-album singles
"Walls"	2020	—	—	—	—	—	—	Non-album singles
"Bring Me Back" (& TAI ft. Enlery)	2020	—	—	—	—	—	—	Non-album singles
"Running" (ft. Raphaélla)	2020	—	—	—	—	—	—	Non-album singles
"Season"	2021	—	—	—	—	—	—	Non-album singles
"—" denotes a recording that did not chart or was not released in that territory.

*Did not appear on the official Belgian Ultratop 50 chart, but rather on the Ultratip chart.
