= Better Off Without You (Becky Hill and Shift K3Y song) =

2020 single by Becky Hill featuring Shift K3Y

Single by Becky Hill and Shift K3Y

from the album Only Honest on the Weekend
- Released: 10 January 2020
- Length: 3:18
- Label: Polydor; Eko
- Songwriters: Lewis Shay Jankel; Rebecca Claire Hill
- Producers: Jarly; Shift K3Y; Svidden

Becky Hill singles chronology
| "Only You" (2019) | "Better Off Without You" (2020) | "Nothing Really Matters" (2020) |

Shift K3Y singles chronology
| "They Wanna Know" (2020) | "Better Off Without You" (2020) | "Do Me No Good" (2020) |

"Better Off Without You" is a song by English singer and songwriter Becky Hill, and British DJ and producer Shift K3Y. It was released on 10 January 2020 as the lead single from her debut studio album, Only Honest on the Weekend. The song peaked at number 14 on the UK Singles Chart.

== Background ==
When talking about the song, Becky Hill said, "'Better Off Without You' is that perfect break up song. Starting the year with those New Year, new me feels, it's your new self love anthem of 2020! Written about a break up of my own, Better Off Without You was a song that I listened to over the course of 2019 that helped me through some really dark times. I can't wait to share this bit of personal therapy with others and watch the song take on a life of its own."

== Music video ==
A music video to accompany the release of "Better Off Without You" was first released onto YouTube on 10 January 2020.

== Personnel ==
Credits adapted from Tidal.

- Jarly – producer, associated performer, bass, drums, guitar, keyboards, piano, programming, sound effects, strings
- Lewis Shay Jankel – producer, composer, lyricist, associated performer, engineer, featured artist, music production, studio personnel
- Svidden – producer, associated performer, bass, drums, guitar, keyboards, piano, programming, sound effects, strings
- Rebecca Claire Hill – composer, lyricist, associated performer, vocals
- Stuart Hawkes – mastering engineer, studio personnel
- Wez Clarke – mixer, studio personnel

== Charts ==
=== Weekly charts ===
| Chart (2020) | Peak position |
|---|---|
| Czech Republic Airplay (ČNS IFPI) | 34 |
| Ireland (IRMA) | 15 |
| Scottish Singles Sales (Official Charts) | 6 |
| UK Singles (Official Charts) | 14 |
| US Hot Dance/Electronic Songs (Billboard) | 46 |

=== Year-end charts ===
| Chart (2020) | Position |
|---|---|
| UK Singles (OCC) | 49 |

== Certifications ==
| Region | Certification | Certified units/sales |
|---|---|---|
| Australia (ARIA) | Gold | 35,000^{‡} |
| United Kingdom (BPI) | Platinum | 600,000^{‡} |
^{‡} Sales+streaming figures based on certification alone.

== Release history ==
| Region | Date | Format | Label |
|---|---|---|---|
| United Kingdom | 10 January 2020 | Digital download; streaming | Polydor; Eko |
