= Lose Control (Meduza, Becky Hill and Goodboys song) =

Single by Meduza, Becky Hill and Goodboys

from the EP Introducing MEDUZA, Get to Know and the album MEDUZA
- Released: 11 October 2019
- Genre: Deep house
- Length: 2:48
- Label: Virgin; Polydor
- Songwriters: Luca de Gregorio; Mattia Vitale; Simone Giani; Rebecca Claire Hill; Joshua Grimmett
- Producer: Meduza

Meduza singles chronology
"Piece of Your Heart" (2019)	"Lose Control" (2019)	"Born to Love" (2020)

Becky Hill singles chronology
"Wish You Well" (2019)	"Lose Control" (2019)	"Only You" (2019)

Goodboys singles chronology
"Piece of Your Heart" (2019)	"Lose Control" (2019)	"Unfamiliar" (2020)

Music video
- "Lose Control" on YouTube

"Lose Control" is a song by Italian production trio Meduza, British singer Becky Hill and production trio Goodboys, released as a single by Virgin Records on 11 October 2019. It reached number 11 on the UK Singles Chart. As of March 2026, the song has amassed more than 1 billion streams on Spotify. The song also appears in Meduza's debut album MEDUZA.

== Background ==
"Lose Control" was largely written and produced in the winter of 2018 originally with vocals by Josh Grimmett from Goodboys and Conor Blake, a co-writer of the song. At the start of 2019, Becky Hill wrote and recorded her vocals for the verses and pre-chorus, which was finished in one day. Meduza described it as a "radio friendly" track.

== Composition ==
The second single by Italian production trio Meduza is a hard house track influenced by dance-pop. It is written in C Minor and has a chord progression Cm — Fm — A♭.

== Music video ==
The music video was filmed in and around the abandoned residential development of Burj Al Babas, near the town of Mudurnu, Turkey.

== Charts ==
=== Weekly charts ===
Chart (2019–2021)	Peak position
Australia (ARIA)	11
Austria (Ö3 Austria Top 40)	53
Belgium (Ultratop 50 Flanders)	6
Belgium (Ultratop 50 Wallonia)	8
Canada Hot 100 (Billboard)	46
Czech Republic Airplay (ČNS IFPI)	3
Czech Republic Singles Digital (ČNS IFPI)	13
El Salvador Airplay (Monitor Latino)	18
France (SNEP)	53
Germany (GfK)	30
Global Excl. US (Billboard)	143
Hungary (Dance Top 40)	5
Hungary (Rádiós Top 40)	5
Hungary (Single Top 40)	5
Hungary (Stream Top 40)	12
Ireland (IRMA)	7
Italy (FIMI)	37
Latvia (LaIPA)	19
Lithuania (AGATA)	5
Netherlands (Dutch Top 40)	11
Netherlands (Single Top 100)	19
New Zealand (Recorded Music NZ)	35
Poland Airplay (ZPAV)	11
Portugal (AFP)	39
Romania (Airplay 100)	15
Romania Airplay (Media Forest)	4
Russia Airplay (TopHit)	3
Scotland Singles (Official Charts)	12
Slovakia Airplay (ČNS IFPI)	5
Slovakia Singles Digital (ČNS IFPI)	13
Slovenia (SloTop50)	7
Sweden (Sverigetopplistan)	75
Switzerland (Schweizer Hitparade)	22
UK Singles (Official Charts)	11
UK Dance (Official Charts)	2
Ukraine Airplay (TopHit)	5
US Dance Club Songs (Billboard)	1
US Hot Dance/Electronic Songs (Billboard)	4

2025 weekly chart performance for "Lose Control"
Chart (2025)	Peak position
Venezuela Airplay (Record Report)	115

=== Monthly charts ===
Monthly chart performance for "Lose Control"
Chart (2019)	Peak position
Latvia Airplay (LaIPA)	3

=== Year-end charts ===
Chart (2019)	Position
CIS (TopHit)	96
Hungary (Dance Top 40)	78
Netherlands (Dutch Top 40)	83
Russia Airplay (TopHit)	91

Chart (2020)	Position
Australia (ARIA)	30
Belgium (Ultratop Flanders)	23
Belgium (Ultratop Wallonia)	39
CIS (TopHit)	23
Denmark (Tracklisten)	97
France (SNEP)	120
Germany (Official German Charts)	82
Hungary (Dance Top 40)	18
Hungary (Rádiós Top 40)	13
Hungary (Single Top 40)	53
Hungary (Stream Top 40)	22
Ireland (IRMA)	46
Netherlands (Dutch Top 40)	75
Netherlands (Single Top 100)	80
Poland (ZPAV)	84
Romania (Airplay 100)	15
Russia Airplay (TopHit)	42
Switzerland (Schweizer Hitparade)	43
UK Singles (OCC)	66
Ukraine Airplay (TopHit)	15
US Hot Dance/Electronic Songs (Billboard)	15

Chart (2021)	Position
CIS (TopHit)	78
Portugal (AFP)	188
Russia Airplay (TopHit)	120
Ukraine Airplay (TopHit)	58

== Certifications ==
Region	Certification	Certified units/sales
Australia (ARIA)	4× Platinum	280,000^{‡}
Austria (IFPI Austria)	Gold	15,000^{‡}
Belgium (BRMA)	Platinum	40,000^{‡}
Brazil (Pro-Música Brasil)	4× Diamond	640,000^{‡}
Canada (Music Canada)	3× Platinum	240,000^{‡}
Denmark (IFPI Danmark)	Platinum	90,000^{‡}
France (SNEP)	Gold	100,000^{‡}
Germany (BVMI)	Platinum	400,000^{‡}
Italy (FIMI)	Platinum	70,000^{‡}
Mexico (AMPROFON)	3× Platinum	180,000^{‡}
New Zealand (RMNZ)	3× Platinum	90,000^{‡}
Poland (ZPAV)	3× Platinum	150,000^{‡}
Portugal (AFP)	2× Platinum	20,000^{‡}
Spain (Promusicae)	Platinum	60,000^{‡}
United Kingdom (BPI)	2× Platinum	1,200,000^{‡}
United States (RIAA)	Platinum	1,000,000^{‡}
Streaming
Greece (IFPI Greece)	Platinum	2,000,000^{†}
Sweden (GLF)	Platinum	8,000,000^{†}
^{‡} Sales+streaming figures based on certification alone.^{†} Streaming-only figures based on certification alone.

== Release history ==
Region	Date	Format	Label	Ref.
Various	11 October 2019	Digital download	Virgin; Polydor	
United States	25 February 2020	Contemporary hit radio	Astralwerks; Capitol	

== See also ==
- List of Billboard number-one dance songs of 2019
