= Rebecca (album) =

Studio album by Becky Hill
- Released: 13 November 2026
- Length: 37:43
- Label: Polydor
- Producers: Neave Applebaum; MJ Cole; D.O.D.; James Hurr; Micah Jasper; Mike Kintish; Mike Lesirge; Frank Nobel; Parisi; Punctual; Sidepiece; Rob Swire

Becky Hill chronology
Believe Me Now? (2024)	Rebecca (2026)

Singles from Rebecca
- 1. "Hands On Me" Released: 29 April 2026; 2. "More! More! More!" Released: 27 May 2026; 3. "What Do I Have to Do?" Released: 3 July 2026; 4. "Changes" Released: 11 September 2026; 5. "Lost the Plot" Released: 30 October 2026

Rebecca is the third studio album by the English singer-songwriter Becky Hill. It was announced in May 2026 and was scheduled for release on 25 September 2026 before being delayed to 13 November 2026.

About the album title, Hill said "Rebecca" means "to tie" or "to bind" telling NME "There are a few themes across the record, and Rebecca felt like an authentic, meaningful way to tie all those together. It's a true embodiment of who I have felt like since I turned 30."

== Track listing ==
Rebecca track listing
No.	Title	Writer(s)	Producer(s)	Length
1.	"Rebecca"	Rebecca Hill; Ryan Ashley; William Lansley; Richard Mears IV; John Morgan; Dylan Ragland	Punctual; Sidepiece	0:51
2.	"Tie Me Down"	Hill; Lansley; Mears; Morgan; Caroline Pennell; Ragland	Punctual; Sidepiece; Ashley^{[v]}	2:45
3.	"Hands On Me"	Hill; Neave Applebaum; James Hurr; Kanata Okajima; Karen Poole	Applebaum	2:17
4.	"More! More! More!"	Hill; Dan O'Donnell; Hurr; Mike Kintish; Poole	D.O.D.; Hurr; MNEK^{[v]}	2:55
5.	"Lost the Plot"	Hill; Applebaum; Charles Boon	Applebaum^{[p]}; Micah Jasper	2:50
6.	"INXS"	Hill; Victor Bolander; Uzoechi Emenike; Nathan Nicholson; Poole	Frank Nobel; MNEK^{[v]}	2:55
7.	"What Do I Have to Do?"	Hill; Kintish; Lansley; Emily Makis; Morgan	Kintish; Punctual	2:33
8.	"Changes"	Hill; Kintish; Lansley; Makis; Morgan	Punctual	2:52
9.	"So Boring"	Hill; Applebaum	Applebaum; Jasper; MNEK^{[v]}	2:30
10.	"Daddy’s Range Rover"	Hill; Charlotte Haining; Kentish; Giampaolo Parisi; Marco Parisi	Parisi; Rob Swire; Ashley^{[v]}	3:13
11.	"Lil’ Miss Nobody"	Hill; Emenike; G. Parisi; M. Parisi; Poole	Parisi	2:42
12.	"Changes" (acoustic)	Hill; Kintish; Lansley; Makis; Morgan	MJ Cole; Mike Lesirge; Ashley^{[v]}	3:30
13.	"Everything / Nothing"	Hill; Applebaum; Hurr; Okajima; Poole	Applebaum; Hurr; Jasper	3:14
14.	"Rebecca Pt. 2"	Hill; Lesirge	Lesirge; Ashley^{[v]}	2:36
Total length:				37:43

=== Notes ===
- "Rebecca" is written in all caps.
- "Tie Me Down" is stylised as "tie me d^wn".
- "Hands On Me" is stylised as ">>>hands on me<<<".
- "Lost the Plot" is stylised as "l0st the pl0t".
- The titles of tracks 7, 10, 11 and 13 are written in lowercase.
- "So Boring" is stylised as "so boring!!!".
- "Rebecca Pt. 2" is stylised as "REBECCA pt. 2".
- ^{^[v]} signifies a vocal producer
- "Changes" (acoustic) and "Rebecca Pt. 2" do not appear on physical copies of the album.

== Personnel ==
These credits are adapted from Tidal.

=== Musicians ===
- Becky Hill – vocals (all tracks), background vocals (tracks 1, 2, 8, 10, 11, 13, 14)
- Ryan Ashley – background vocals (1, 2, 8, 10–12), vocal arrangement (1, 12, 14)
- Punctual – programming (1, 2, 7, 8); bass, synthesizer (1, 7, 8); drum kit (1, 8), drum programming (7)
- Sidepiece – programming (1, 2)
- Neave Applebaum – programming (3, 5, 9, 13)
- James Hurr – programming (4, 13)
- D.O.D. – programming (4)
- Micah Jasper – programming (5, 9, 13)
- Frank Nobel – background vocals, bass, drum kit, keyboards (6)
- Nathan Nicholson – background vocals, electric guitar (6)
- Karen Poole – background vocals (6)
- Mike Kintish – programming (7)
- Marco Parisi – bass, guitar, keyboards, programming, sound design (10, 11)
- Giampaolo Parisi – drum kit, percussion, programming, sound design (10, 11)
- Rob Swire – programming (10)
- Mike Lesirge – conducting (12–14), arrangement (12, 14)
- The Heritage Orchestra – orchestra (12–14)
- Sam Freeman – bass trombone (12–14)
- Nerys Richards – cello (12–14)
- Andy Marshall – double bass (12–14)
- Carys Evans – French horn (12–14)
- Phillippa Slack – French horn (12–14)
- Alex Maynard – trumpet (12–14)
- Mike Poyser – tuba (12–14)
- Annie Beilby – viola (12–14)
- Catriona Parker – violin (12–14)
- Jenny Sacha – violin (12–14)
- Jeremy Isaac – violin (12–14)
- Martin Lissola – violin (12–14)
- Millie Ashton – violin (12–14)
- Fiona Leggat – viola (12), violin (13, 14)
- Jon Stokes – trombone (12, 13)
- James Thompson – background vocals (12)
- Sacha Savory – background vocals (12)
- Tehillah Ediri – background vocals (12)
- Yasmin Green – background vocals (12)
- Brian O'Kane – cello (12)
- Katherine Jenkinson – cello (12)
- Elise Campbell – French horn (12)
- MJ Cole – piano (12)
- Andy Wood – trombone (12)
- Russell Bennett – trumpet (12)
- Victoria Isfryn – trumpet (12)
- Rachel Robson – viola (12)
- Emma Parker – violin (12)
- Jennifer Coombes – violin (12)
- Martyn Jackson – violin (12)
- Paddy Roberts – violin (12)
- Ben Trigg – cello (13, 14)
- Rachael Lander – cello (13, 14)
- Chris Gough – French horn (13, 14)
- Adam Chatterton – trumpet (13, 14)
- Tom Rees-Roberts – trumpet (13, 14)
- Emma Owens – viola (13, 14)
- Jenny Poyser – viola (13, 14)
- Michael Jones – violin (13, 14)
- Nicky Sweeney – violin (13, 14)
- Shlomy Dobrinsky – violin (13, 14)
- Matt Lewis – trombone (13)
- Steve Pringle – piano (14)

=== Technical ===
- Geoff Swan – mixing
- Stuart Hawkes – mastering (1, 11)
- Matt Colton – mastering (2–10, 12–14)
- Evie Clark-Yospa – additional engineering (1, 2, 8, 10, 11, 13)
- Eva Valentin – engineering (12)
- Fiona Cruickshank – engineering (12)
- Paul Pritchard – engineering (14)

== Charts ==
Chart performance for Rebecca
Chart (2026)	Peak position
Belgian Albums (Ultratop Flanders)	139
Scottish Albums (Official Charts)	13
UK Albums (Official Charts)	6
UK Dance Albums (Official Charts)	1
