= Wish You Well (Sigala and Becky Hill song) =

2019 single by Sigala and Becky Hill

Single by Sigala and Becky Hill

from the album Get to Know and Every Cloud – Silver Linings
- Released: 24 May 2019
- Genre: House; pop
- Length: 3:25
- Label: Ministry of Sound; B1; Arista
- Songwriter(s): Bruce Fielder; Joakim Jarl; Jenson Vaughan; Andreas Krüger; Rebecca Claire Hill; Ryan Campbell; Maegan Cottone
- Producer(s): Sigala; Jarly

Sigala singles chronology
| "Just Got Paid" (2018) | "Wish You Well" (2019) | "We Got Love" (2019) |

Becky Hill singles chronology
| "I Could Get Used to This" (2019) | "Wish You Well" (2019) | "Lose Control" (2019) |

"Wish You Well" is a song by English DJ Sigala and English singer Becky Hill, released on 24 May 2019 through Ministry of Sound and B1 Recordings. The single peaked at number eight on the UK Singles Chart, becoming Sigala's seventh UK top 10 and Becky Hill's second top 10 (third overall including her uncredited appearance on "Afterglow" by Wilkinson).

== Promotion ==
Sigala announced the collaboration in a post to social media on 20 May, sharing a 15-second audio clip of the song.

== Critical reception ==
Billboard's Kat Bein considered the summer song as "a powerful house pop tune with cascading synths, tension-filled builds and an ecstatic, club-ready release." She also wrote that the song uses elements that were popular earlier in the 2010s decade, presented with a modern sheen and sensibility.

== Live performances ==
Sigala and Hill performed the song on BBC Radio 1's Big Weekend 2019 on 25 May 2019 (the day after the song's release). Sigala and Hill also performed the song together at Capital FM's Summertime Ball 2019 on 8 June 2019 at Wembley Stadium.

== Personnel ==
Credits adapted from Tidal.

- Sigala – instruments, vocal production, production, mix engineering, programming
- Becky Hill – vocal
- Jarly – production
- Kevin Grainger – master engineering, mixing engineering
- Dipesh Parmar – performance arranging
- Milly McGregor – strings
- Andreas Krüger – vocal production
- Ryan Ashley – vocal production
- Maegan Cottone – Songwriter
- Jenson Vaughan – Songwriter

== Charts ==
=== Weekly charts ===
| Chart (2019) | Peak position |
|---|---|
| Belgium (Ultratip Bubbling Under Flanders) | 13 |
| Belgium (Ultratip Bubbling Under Wallonia) | 2 |
| Croatia Airplay (HRT) | 27 |
| China Airplay/FL (Billboard) | 9 |
| Hungary (Rádiós Top 40) | 22 |
| Ireland (IRMA) | 8 |
| Latvia (Latvijas Top 40) | 7 |
| New Zealand Hot Singles (RMNZ) | 28 |
| Poland (Polish Airplay Top 100) | 4 |
| Romania (Airplay 100) | 67 |
| Scotland (OCC) | 5 |
| Switzerland (Schweizer Hitparade) | 64 |
| UK Singles (OCC) | 8 |
| UK Dance (OCC) | 1 |
| Ukraine Airplay (TopHit) | 71 |
| US Hot Dance/Electronic Songs (Billboard) | 32 |

=== Year-end charts ===
| Chart (2019) | Position |
|---|---|
| Poland (ZPAV) | 57 |
| UK Singles (Official Charts Company) | 49 |
| US Hot Dance/Electronic Songs (Billboard) | 87 |

== Certifications ==
Certifications for "Wish You Well"
| Region | Certification | Certified units/sales |
|---|---|---|
| Canada (Music Canada) | Gold | 40,000^{‡} |
| New Zealand (RMNZ) | Gold | 15,000^{‡} |
| Poland (ZPAV) | Gold | 25,000^{‡} |
| United Kingdom (BPI) | 2× Platinum | 1,200,000^{‡} |
^{‡} Sales+streaming figures based on certification alone.
