= Bondax =

British musical duo

- Origin: Lancaster, Lancashire, England
- Genres: Future garage, electronic
- Years active: 2011–present
- Labels: Justus Recordings, Super Recordings, Relentless Records
- Members: Adam Kaye; George Townsend

Bondax is an electronic music duo consisting of English musicians Adam Kaye (born 1 April 1994) and George Townsend (born 17 September 1993). The group gained prominence primarily as a result of BBC Radio, initially through BBC Introducing Lancashire before receiving BBC Radio 1 airtime from the a range of DJs including Nick Grimshaw and Annie Mac. Bondax's sound has often been described as genre-transcending; Moses Wiener of Dazed details the band's sound as "the aural equivalent of sipping an ice-cold Pimms on the balcony of your council estate flat.".

In 2012, Bondax started their own record label, Just Us Recordings. The first release on the label was a track by fellow producer Karma Kid entitled "It's Always".

In 2013, the duo performed at a number of festivals across Europe, including Bestival, Creamfields, and Beacons.

== Discography ==
=== Singles ===
| Title | Year |
|---|---|
| "Enter / You're So" | 2012 |
| "Baby I Got That" | 2012 |
| "Gold" | 2013 |
| "Giving It All" | 2013 |
| "Wet Summer" | 2013 |
| "Fires" | 2013 |
| "All I See" | 2014 |
| "Let Me Be" | 2014 |
| "Temptation" | 2015 |
| "Unlimited Endurance" | 2016 |
| "Neo Seoul" | 2018 |
| "Real Thing" | 2018 |
| "Deeper" | 2018 |
| "To Survive" | 2024 |

=== Extended plays ===
- Baby I Got That (2012), Relentless Records
