= Get to Know =

Compilation album by Becky Hill
- Released: 27 September 2019
- Recorded: 2013–2018
- Label: Polydor
- Producer: MNEK; Ryan Ashley; MK; Chris Loco; Weiss; Mark Ralph; Mike Kintish; Sigala; Jarly; Jenson Vaughan; Mark Hill; Jonas Blue; Shift K3Y; Oliver Heldens; Wilkinson; Bradford Ellis; MJ Cole; LostBoy; Hitimpulse; ADP; Matoma; Daniel Davidsen; Pete Wallevik; Cutfather; Charlie Hugall; Meduza

Becky Hill chronology
Eko (2017)	Get to Know (2019)	Only Honest on the Weekend (2021)

Singles from Get to Know
- 1. "Afterglow" Released: 13 October 2013; 2. "Gecko" Released: 22 June 2014; 3. "Piece of Me" Released: 27 February 2016; 4. "False Alarm" Released: 24 June 2016; 5. "Sunrise in the East" Released: 6 June 2018; 6. "Back & Forth" Released: 7 September 2018; 7. "I Could Get Used to This" Released: 29 March 2019; 8. "Wish You Well" Released: 24 May 2019; 9. "Lose Control" Released: 11 October 2019

Get to Know is the debut compilation album by British pop singer Becky Hill. It was released on 27 September 2019 through Polydor Records as the singer's first project, containing hit singles and new songs that were recorded by her throughout her musical career from 2013 to 2019. The compilation includes the number-one song "Gecko (Overdrive)" and the top 40 singles "Afterglow", "Piece of Me", "False Alarm", "Back & Forth", "Wish You Well" and "Lose Control".

Get to Know peaked at number 20 on the UK Albums Chart and was certified platinum by the British Phonographic Industry.

== Background ==
Following her participation as a contestant on the first series of The Voice UK in 2012, it was revealed that Hill remained in touch with some of people who worked on the show and said that they were responsible for getting her into the industry. In an interview on Sunday Brunch, she said, "I was living in a shared flat in London with a few of the other contestants from the show and, also about to make it into the industry, had to get myself a lawyer, and I was only 17 at the time. I had to grow up a lot." She began working with a range of people, including Rudimental and Wilkinson before she got picked up by her current and close working friend MNEK.

in 2014, she signed to Parlophone Records and started to work on her debut album. She released the collaborative single "Gecko (Overdrive)" with Oliver Heldens, which reached number one on the UK Singles Chart and make her the first The Voice UK contestant to achieve a number-one record on the UK Charts. Not long after, she released a couple of singles, entitled "Losing" and "Caution to The Wind" as promotion for her project and that it would be released in 2014. By the end of the year, the project was on hold and said that it would be released the following year. In the later months of 2015, Hill told MTV that the album was pretty much done and that she was "waiting for it to be polished up and released". She also revealed that half of the project was worked on with MNEK. Later, she revealed that the album was "99 per cent complete" and that it would be released in early 2016.

In 2016, Hill was dropped from Parlophone, which meant that her debut album was therefore scrapped. Hill established her own record label with her own team called Eko Music Limited and began releasing some more material. This also sparked the release of her two collaborations of the year, "Piece of Me" with Marc Kinchen, and "False Alarm" with Matoma, which were both expected to be solo efforts that would have appeared on her scrapped project. Overlapping into 2017, she also released her own singles "Back to My Love", "Warm", "Rude Love" and "Unpredictable", which made up her debut extended play Eko.

In May 2017, Hill signed to Sony Music Entertainment, and later to Polydor Records in August 2017. Upon signing her record deal, manager Alex Martin was quoted as saying, "Becky is at an incredibly exciting stage in her career. The public have only seen a small amount of Becky as a solo artist and what she can do and we were looking for the right partner to work with to take that further".

In 2018, she released the single "Sunrise in the East", which was treated as the lead cut from her supposedly rejuvenated debut project. Not long after, she took part in a range of collaborations, including the song "Back & Forth", alongside Marc Kinchen and Jonas Blue. This continued the following year with "I Could Get Used to This", with Weiss, and finally "Wish You Well", with Sigala, which became her first top 10 hit in the UK Charts since "Gecko (Overdrive)". Additionally, she also achieved success as a songwriter when she wrote the song "All Day and Night" by Jax Jones, Martin Solveig and Madison Beer, which was her first written effort to make it to the top 10 in the UK Charts.

On 24 September 2019, Hill announced on social media that she was going to be releasing a "mini-album", which included previous hits and four brand new tracks. These four tracks were previously planned on being released on their own as an extended play, entitled Fickle Emotions, but the idea was scrapped before including them on a compilation album. It was released on 27 September 2019.

In October 2019, Becky collaborated on the song "Lose Control", alongside then breakthrough acts Meduza and Goodboys, and was later released through the 2019 re-released version of Get to Know.

== Track listing ==
Get to Know track listing
No.	Title	Writer(s)	Producer(s)	Length
1.	"Changing"	Rebecca Hill; Karen Poole; Christopher Crowhurst	Chris Loco; Ryan Ashley^{[c]}	3:08
2.	"Lose Control (Note: Added on the 2019 reissue)" (with Meduza and Goodboys)	Hill; Luca de Gregorio; Mattias Vitale; Simone Giani; Joshua Grimmett; Connor Manning	Meduza; Ashley^{[c]}	2:48
3.	"I Could Get Used to This" (with Weiss)	Hill; Uzoechi Emenike; Ryan Campbell; Michael Kintish; Mark Ralph	Ralph; Weiss^{[b]}; Mike Kintish^{[c]}; MNEK^{[c]}	3:14
4.	"Wish You Well" (with Sigala)	Hill; Campbell; Maegan Cottone; Bruce Fielder; Joakim Jarl; Jenson Vaughan; Andreas Kruger	Sigala; Jarly^{[a]}; Ashley^{[c]}; Vaughan^{[c]}	3:26
5.	"Find a Place" (featuring MNEK)	Hill; Emenike; Mark Hill	Hill; MNEK^{[b]}	3:43
6.	"Back & Forth" (with MK and Jonas Blue)	Hill; Kintish; Marc Kinchen; Guy James Robin	MK; Jonas Blue; MNEK	3:16
7.	"Breakdown"	Hill; Lewis Jankel	Shift K3Y	3:02
8.	"Gecko" (with Oliver Heldens)	Hill; Emenike; Oliver Heldens	Heldens; MNEK^{[c]}	2:46
9.	"Afterglow" (with Wilkinson)	Hill; Talay Riley; Mark Wilkinson; Bradford Ellis	Wilkinson; Ellis	3:45
10.	"Stranger"	Hill; Emenike; Matthew Coleman	MJ Cole; Ashley^{[c]}	3:52
11.	"Piece of Me" (with MK)	Hill; Mary Leay; Timothy Powell; Kinchen	MK; MNEK	3:08
12.	"Sunrise in the East"	Hill; Michael Stafford; Peter Rycroft	LostBoy; Hitimpulse; ADP	3:15
13.	"False Alarm" (with Matoma)	Hill; Kara DioGuardi; James Newman; Thomas Lagergren; Daniel Heløy Davidsen; Peter Wallevik; Mich Hansen	Matoma; Davidsen; Wallevik; Cutfather; MNEK	3:42
14.	"I Could Get Used to This" (orchestral acoustic)	Hill; Emenike; Campbell; Kintish; Ralph	Charlie Hugall	3:19

Notes

- ^{^[a]} signifies a co-producer
- ^{^[b]} signifies an additional producer
- ^{^[c]} signifies a vocal producer

== Charts ==
=== Weekly charts ===
Weekly chart performance for Get to Know
Chart (2019–2020)	Peak position
French Albums (SNEP)	173
Irish Albums (IRMA)	14
UK Albums (Official Charts)	20
US Top Dance Albums (Billboard)	15

=== Year-end charts ===
2020 year-end chart performance for Get to Know
Chart (2020)	Position
Irish Albums (IRMA)	26
UK Albums (OCC)	27

2021 year-end chart performance for Get to Know
Chart (2021)	Position
Irish Albums (IRMA)	40
UK Albums (OCC)	41

2022 year-end chart performance for Get to Know
Chart (2022)	Position
UK Albums (OCC)	73

== Certifications ==
Certifications for Get to Know
Region	Certification	Certified units/sales
New Zealand (RMNZ)	Gold	7,500^{‡}
United Kingdom (BPI)	Platinum	300,000^{‡}
^{‡} Sales+streaming figures based on certification alone.

== See also ==
- List of albums which have spent the most weeks on the UK Albums Chart
