= I Could Get Used to This =

Single by Becky Hill and Weiss

from the album Get to Know
- Released: 29 March 2019
- Length: 3:45
- Label: Polydor; Eko
- Songwriter(s): Rebecca Hill; Mark Ralph; Uzoechi Emenike; Michael Kintish; Ryan Campell
- Producer(s): Ralph; Weiss (add.); Kintish (v.); MNEK (v.)

Becky Hill singles chronology
"Back & Forth" (2018)	"I Could Get Used to This" (2019)	"Wish You Well" (2019)

Weiss singles chronology
"Push It Up" (2018)	"I Could Get Used to This" (2019)	"Let Me Love You" (2019)

Music video
- "I Could Get Used to This" on YouTube

"I Could Get Used to This" is a song by English singer Becky Hill and English DJ Weiss, released by labels Polydor Records and Eko Records on 29 March 2019. The song was written by Hill, Mark Ralph, MNEK, Michael Kintish and Ryan Ashley, and was produced by Ralph and Weiss, with additional vocal production by Kintish and MNEK. The music video for the song was released alongside the single, and was directed by Michael Holyk. "I Could Get Used to This" achieved moderate success on the UK Singles Chart, reaching a peak of No. 45.

== Credits and personnel ==
Credits adapted from Tidal.

- Becky Hill – lead vocals, composition
- Ryan Ashley – composition
- Matt Colton – mastering, studio personnel
- Ross Fortune – engineering, studio personnel
- Tom A.D. Fuller – engineering, studio personnel
- Michael Kintish – composition, vocal production
- MNEK – composition, vocal production
- Mark Ralph – music production, composition, mixing, post-production, studio personnel
- Weiss – music production, additional production

== Charts ==
Chart (2019)	Peak position
Ireland (IRMA)	30
Scotland (OCC)	35
UK Singles (OCC)	45
UK Dance (OCC)	6

== Certifications ==
Region	Certification	Certified units/sales
United Kingdom (BPI)	Platinum	600,000^{‡}
^{‡} Sales+streaming figures based on certification alone.
