= Gecko (song) =

2013 single by Oliver Heldens

Single by Oliver Heldens
- Released: 13 January 2014
- Genre: Future house
- Length: 4:42
- Label: Musical Freedom; Spinnin'
- Songwriter: Oliver Heldens
- Producer: Oliver Heldens

Oliver Heldens singles chronology
"Javelin" (2013)	"Gecko" (2014)	"Feel Good (Oliver Heldens Remix)" (2014)

"Gecko" is an instrumental by Dutch DJ and producer Oliver Heldens. It was released worldwide as a digital download on Beatport on 30 December 2013. It received a mainstream release as a digital download on 13 January 2014 in the Netherlands. The song charted in Belgium and the Netherlands. It was written and produced by Oliver Heldens.

== Chart performance ==
=== Charts ===
Chart (2014)	Peak position
Belgium (Ultratop 50 Flanders)	46
Belgium (Ultratip Bubbling Under Wallonia)	22
France (SNEP)	73
Netherlands (Single Top 100)	32

== Gecko (Overdrive) ==
"Gecko (Overdrive)"

Single by Oliver Heldens and Becky Hill

from the album Get to Know
- Released: 22 June 2014
- Recorded: 2013
- Genre: Future house
- Length: 2:45
- Label: FFRR; Musical Freedom; Ministry of Sound
- Songwriters: Oliver Heldens; Becky Hill; Uzo Emenike
- Producer: Oliver Heldens

Oliver Heldens singles chronology
"Feel Good (Oliver Heldens Remix)" (2014)	"Gecko (Overdrive)" (2014)	"Koala" (2014)

Becky Hill singles chronology
"Powerless" (2014)	"Gecko (Overdrive)" (2014)	"Caution to the Wind" (2014)

Oliver Heldens released a second version of the song titled "Gecko (Overdrive)" featuring guest vocals from British singer Becky Hill. It was released as a digital download on 22 June 2014. It debuted at number one on both the UK Dance Chart and the UK Singles Chart. Notably, "Gecko (Overdrive)" was the last number one in the United Kingdom to be based on sales alone, as streaming became incorporated into the chart the following week. Additionally, Becky Hill also became the first The Voice UK alum to have a UK Number 1 single. In 2014, "Gecko (Overdrive)" was featured in the soundtrack of the video game Forza Horizon 2.

=== Music video ===
A music video, containing grotesque imagery, was created for the song on 20 May 2014. The video begins with a man (played by Doug Willen) who rushes home from work to surprise his wife (Twila Ilgenfritz) for their wedding anniversary. He searches all over the house but can't seem to find her. He starts to meditate and a hand emerges from the anniversary cake. The wife jumps out and starts throwing her husband around the kitchen, dances sexually with him and kissing him aggressively before their daughter (Michaela Annette) and her boyfriend (Tim Allan) walk in on them. The four all have a very uncomfortable dinner, where the man and woman begin to act sexually again. The daughter and her boyfriend go upstairs, where the boy sees the woman has got tentacles. He and the daughter go into her room and uncomfortably kiss. While the man and woman have sex and use their tentacles and drip red and blue goo on each other, the daughter gets a pink tentacle and pulls her boyfriend into a kiss. The video ends with the man driving the boyfriend home.

=== Track listing ===
Digital download
No.	Title	Length
1.	"Gecko (Overdrive)" (Radio Edit)	2:46
2.	"Gecko (Overdrive)" (Extended Edit)	4:57
3.	"Gecko (Overdrive)" (Jack Beats Remix)	4:54
4.	"Gecko (Overdrive)" (Matrix & Futurebound Remix)	3:38
5.	"Gecko (Overdrive)" (DJ S.K.T Remix)	4:25

=== Charts ===
==== Weekly charts ====
Chart (2014–15)	Peak position
Australia (ARIA)	71
Austria (Ö3 Austria Top 40)	35
Germany (GfK)	23
Hungary (Dance Top 40)	28
Ireland (IRMA)	30
Latvia (European Hit Radio)	1
Netherlands (Single Top 100)	48
Poland Dance (ZPAV)	6
Scottish Singles Sales (Official Charts)	2
Sweden (Sverigetopplistan)	55
Switzerland (Schweizer Hitparade)	23
UK Dance (Official Charts)	1
UK Singles (Official Charts)	1
US Hot Dance/Electronic Songs (Billboard)	33

==== Year-end charts ====
Chart (2014)	Position
UK Singles (Official Charts Company)	35
US Hot Dance/Electronic Songs (Billboard)	86
Chart (2015)	Position
Hungary (Dance Top 40)	97

=== Certifications ===
Region	Certification	Certified units/sales
Denmark (IFPI Danmark)	Gold	45,000^{‡}
Germany (BVMI)	Gold	200,000^{‡}
New Zealand (RMNZ)	2× Platinum	60,000^{‡}
United Kingdom (BPI)	3× Platinum	1,800,000^{‡}
^{‡} Sales+streaming figures based on certification alone.
