= Piece of Me (MK and Becky Hill song) =

Single by MK and Becky Hill

from the album Get to Know and In the Night Again
- Released: 27 February 2016
- Recorded: 2015
- Genre: Deep house
- Length: 3:08
- Label: Sony
- Songwriters: Marc Kinchen; Mary Leay; Rebecca Hill; Timothy Martin Powell
- Producer: MK

MK singles chronology
"Bring Me to Life" (2015)	"Piece of Me" (2016)	"My Love 4 U" (2016)

Becky Hill singles chronology
"Back to My Love" (2016)	"Piece of Me" (2016)	"False Alarm" (2016)

"Piece of Me" is a song recorded by American deep house DJ Marc Kinchen and British singer Becky Hill. The song was released as a digital download on 27 February 2016 through Sony Music. The song peaked to number 37 on the UK Singles Chart. The song was written by Marc Kinchen, Mary Leay, Rebecca Hill and Timothy Martin Powell.

== Music video ==
A music video to accompany the release of "Piece of Me" was first released onto YouTube on 15 April 2016 at a total length of two minutes and fifty-one seconds.

== Chart performance ==
=== Weekly charts ===
Chart (2016)	Peak position
Belgium (Ultratip Bubbling Under Flanders)	32
Ireland (IRMA)	53
Scottish Singles Sales (Official Charts)	43
UK Singles (Official Charts)	37
UK Singles Downloads (Official Charts)	38
UK Dance (Official Charts)	12
US Dance Club Songs (Billboard)	5

== Certifications ==
Region	Certification	Certified units/sales
United Kingdom (BPI)	2× Platinum	1,200,000^{‡}
^{‡} Sales+streaming figures based on certification alone.

== Release history ==
Region	Date	Format	Label
United Kingdom	8 April 2016	Digital download	Sony
