= False Alarm (Matoma and Becky Hill song) =

Single by Matoma and Becky Hill

from the album Hakuna Matoma, One in a Million and Get to Know
- Released: 24 June 2016
- Recorded: 2015
- Genre: Tropical house
- Length: 3:44
- Label: Warner Music Group
- Songwriter(s): Daniel Heløy Davidsen; James Newman; Kara DioGuardi; Mich Hansen; Peter Wallevik; Rebecca Hill; Tom Lagergren
- Producer(s): Davidson; Wallevik; Matoma; Cutfather; MNEK

Matoma singles chronology
"Take Me Back" (2015)	"False Alarm" (2016)	"All Night" (2016)

Becky Hill singles chronology
"Piece of Me" (2016)	"False Alarm" (2016)	"Warm" (2016)

"False Alarm" is a song written by British singer Becky Hill and produced by Norwegian DJ and tropical house record producer Matoma. Written at a writing camp in Copenhagen with the acclaimed songwriter Kara DioGuardi, the song was released as a digital download on 24 June 2016 through Warner Music Group. The song peaked at number 28 on the UK Singles Chart and number 52 on the Irish Singles Chart. It also charted in Belgium, Norway and Sweden. Although originally included on Matoma's 2016 debut album Hakuna Matoma, it was also later included on his second album, One in a Million (2018).

== Music video ==
A music video to accompany the release of "False Alarm" was first released onto YouTube on 5 August 2016 at a total length of three minutes and thirty-five seconds.

== Track listing ==
Digital download
No.	Title	Length
1.	"False Alarm"	3:44

Digital download – Remixes EP
No.	Title	Length
1.	"False Alarm" (Hook N Sling Remix)	4:25
2.	"False Alarm" (Steve Roid Remix)	4:03
3.	"False Alarm" (KC Lights Remix)	5:18
4.	"False Alarm" (Mohito Campfire Remix)	3:39

Digital download – Remixes Vol. II
No.	Title	Length
1.	"False Alarm" (Alex Ross Remix)	5:00
2.	"False Alarm" (Justice Skolnik Remix)	4:04
3.	"False Alarm" (Loosid Remix)	4:00

== Charts ==
=== Weekly charts ===
Chart (2016)	Peak position
Belgium (Ultratop 50 Flanders)	48
Ireland (IRMA)	51
Norway (VG-lista)	3
Scotland (OCC)	15
Sweden (Sverigetopplistan)	11
UK Singles (OCC)	28
UK Dance (OCC)	12
US Hot Dance/Electronic Songs (Billboard)	16

=== Year-end charts ===
Chart (2016)	Position
Sweden (Sverigetopplistan)	79
US Hot Dance/Electronic Songs (Billboard)	45

== Certifications ==
Region	Certification	Certified units/sales
Italy (FIMI)	Gold	25,000^{‡}
New Zealand (RMNZ)	Gold	15,000^{‡}
United Kingdom (BPI)	Platinum	600,000^{‡}
United States (RIAA)	Gold	500,000^{‡}
^{‡} Sales+streaming figures based on certification alone.

== Release history ==
Region	Date	Format	Version	Label	Ref.
United Kingdom	24 June 2016	Digital download	Original	Warner Music Group	
Italy	8 July 2016	Contemporary hit radio	Original	Warner Music Group	
United States	26 August 2016	Digital download	Remixes EP	Warner Music Group	
United States	7 October 2016	Digital download	Remixes Vol. II	Warner Music Group	
