= Back & Forth (MK, Jonas Blue and Becky Hill song) =

Single by MK, Jonas Blue and Becky Hill

from the album Get to Know, Est. 1989 and In the Night Again
- Released: September 7, 2018
- Recorded: 2018
- Genre: House
- Length: 3:16
- Label: Sony
- Songwriters: Marc Kinchen; Mike Kintish; Rebecca Claire Hill; Guy Robin
- Producers: MK; MNEK; Jonas Blue

MK singles chronology
| "17" (2017) | "Back & Forth" (2018) | "Body 2 Body" (2019) |

Jonas Blue singles chronology
| "I See Love" (2018) | "Back & Forth" (2018) | "Roll with Me" (2018) |

Becky Hill singles chronology
| "Sunrise in the East" (2018) | "Back & Forth" (2018) | "I Could Get Used to This" (2019) |

"Back & Forth" is a song by the American DJ and record producer MK, English DJ and record producer Jonas Blue and English singer Becky Hill. It was released as a digital download on September 7, 2018, via Sony Music. In December 2018, it gained airplay in Mexico across various radio stations devoted to Top 40 music.

== Music video ==
A music video to accompany the release of "Back & Forth" was first released onto YouTube on 23 October 2018 at a total length of three minutes and twenty-two seconds.

=== Synopsis ===
A man is shown in his kitchen making a sandwich and dancing, when his wife returns home, it is revealed that he is suffering from a mysterious condition that causes him to dance uncontrollably and reproduce the same jittery movements in a loop. His wife drives him to the hospital where a doctor is unable to diagnose him, and his condition causes him to get in trouble both at work and with his family. The doctor prescribes the wife medication which the man refuses (or is unable to) take, and eventually the doctor reveals that the man's condition will soon be fatal. At the man's funeral, as the funeral attendants kiss the man's forehead in respect, the doctor realizes much too late that the condition is contagious through physical touch, and rushes to warn them only to discover he is too late, and that the funeral attendants have also begun dancing, as he himself begins to succumb to the illness.

== Commercial performance ==
On September 14, 2018, the song entered at number 52 on the UK Singles Chart. The song reached the Top 40 on October 5, 2018, charting at number 37, and reached number 21 the next week. The track climbed to number 17 in its sixth week.

== Track listing ==
Digital download
| No. | Title | Length |
|---|---|---|
| 1. | "Back & Forth" | 3:16 |
| 2. | "Back & Forth" (MK dub) | 6:00 |

Digital download – remix
| No. | Title | Length |
|---|---|---|
| 1. | "Back & Forth" (Franky Rizardo remix) | 3:24 |

== Charts ==
| Chart (2018) | Peak position |
|---|---|
| Czech Republic Airplay (ČNS IFPI) | 31 |
| Ireland (IRMA) | 11 |
| Scottish Singles Sales (Official Charts) | 20 |
| UK Singles (Official Charts) | 12 |
| US Hot Dance/Electronic Songs (Billboard) | 32 |

== Certifications ==
| Region | Certification | Certified units/sales |
|---|---|---|
| New Zealand (RMNZ) | Gold | 15,000^{‡} |
| United Kingdom (BPI) | Platinum | 600,000^{‡} |
^{‡} Sales+streaming figures based on certification alone.

== Release history ==
| Region | Date | Format | Label |
|---|---|---|---|
| United Kingdom | September 7, 2018 | Digital download; streaming | Sony |
