= Becky Hill =

British singer (born 1994)

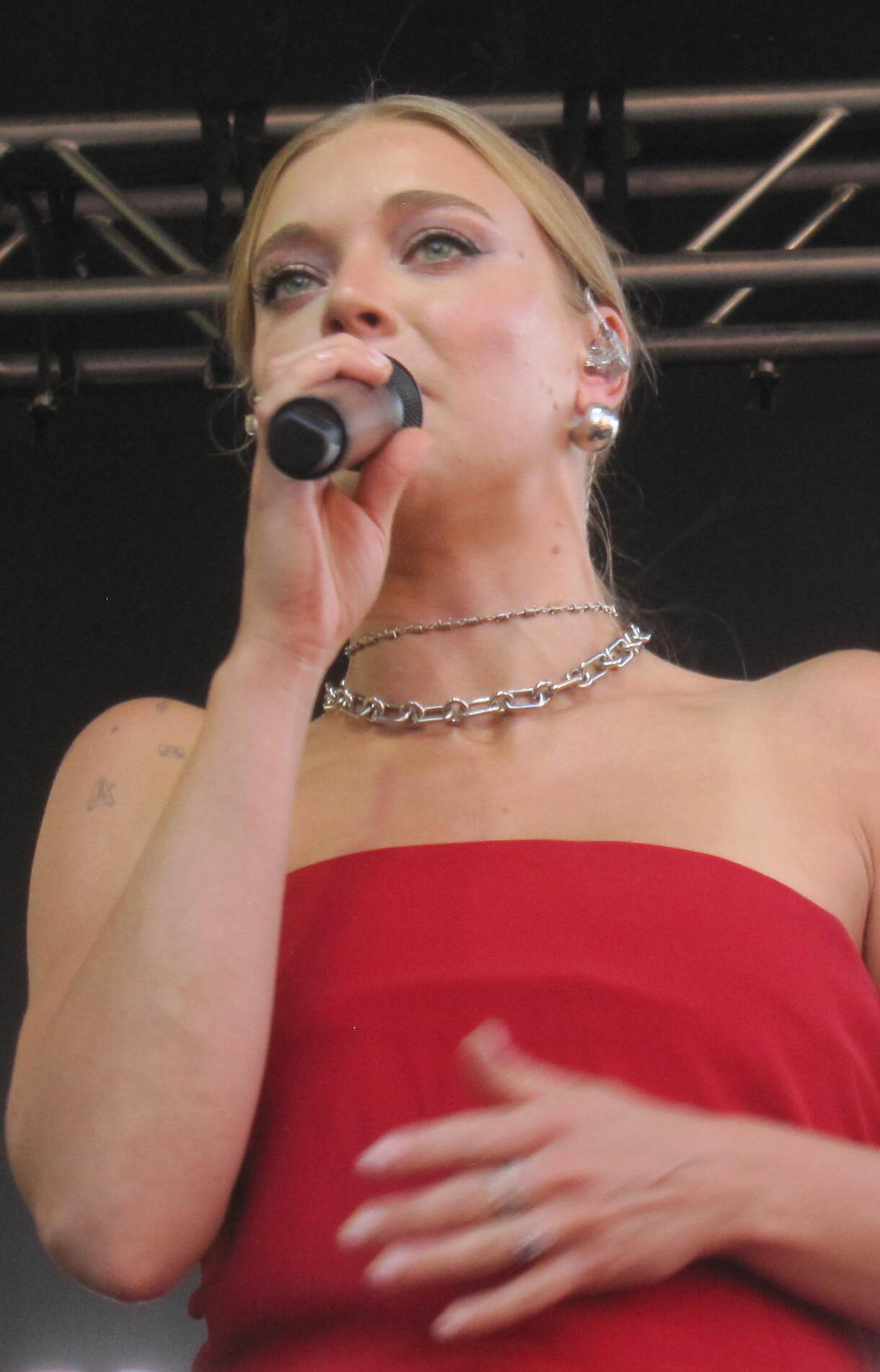
- Hill performing at Capitol Hill Block Party in 2024

Background information
- Born: Rebecca Claire Hill; 14 February 1994 (age 32); Bewdley, Worcestershire, England
- Genres: Pop; drum and bass; EDM; dance-pop; R&B; house; UK funky; electro
- Occupation: Singer
- Instrument: Vocals
- Works: Discography
- Years active: 2012–present
- Labels: Parlophone; Polydor
- Spouse: Charlie Gardner (m. 2025)

Rebecca Claire Hill (born 14 February 1994) is an English singer. She rose to prominence after appearing on the first series of The Voice UK, auditioning with John Legend's "Ordinary People". She joined Jessie J's team and reached the semi-finals of the competition.

In June 2014, she became the first The Voice UK contestant to score a UK number one single when the song "Gecko (Overdrive)" with Oliver Heldens topped the UK Singles Chart. In 2022, she received two Brit Awards nominations, including British Song of the Year for "Remember" with David Guetta, and Best Dance Act, which she won two years in a row in 2022 and 2023.

== Early life ==
Becky Hill was born in Bewdley, Worcestershire on 14 February 1994. She began making music at the age of 14 and started performing in a band called Shaking Trees – receiving BBC Introducing support from Andrew Marston at BBC Hereford & Worcester, who selected her band to perform at the Nozstock Festival of Performing Arts, as well as a live session for Adam Green and Josh Withey at BBC Radio Shropshire.

== Career ==
=== 2012: The Voice ===
Hill has appeared in a number of live performances for YouTube, including a web series called The Rebelations. She auditioned for the first series of The Voice UK, and at the blind auditions she performed "Ordinary People". Judges Jessie J and will.i.am, the only coaches with an available space on their teams, turned around for her. She opted to join Jessie. In the battle rounds she competed against Indie and Pixie performing the song "Irreplaceable", she won the battle and progressed to the live shows. She got to the semi-final stage of the competition where she was eliminated.

Performances on The Voice UK
Performed	Song	Original Artist	Result
Blind Audition	"Ordinary People"	John Legend	Joined Team Jessie
Battle Rounds	"Irreplaceable" (against Indie and Pixie)	Beyoncé	Winner
Week 1	—N/a		
Week 2	"Good Luck"	Basement Jaxx	Safe
Week 3	—N/a		
Week 4	"Seven Nation Army"	The White Stripes	Bottom three
Semi-final	"Like a Star"	Corinne Bailey Rae	Eliminated

=== 2013–2017: Breakthrough and Eko EP ===
Since appearing on The Voice UK, versions of David Guetta's "She Wolf" and "Not Giving In" by Rudimental have been published, as have covers of Paolo Nutini's "Last Request" and Alex Clare's "Too Close". Hill featured on Rudimental's track "Powerless", taken from their debut album Home. She also provided cover for Ella Eyre's vocals for Rudimental's set at Glastonbury 2013, Bestival 2013, Wakestock 2013 and Lovebox 2013. Hill provided vocals for and co-wrote Wilkinson's song Afterglow, which peaked at number 8 on the UK Singles Chart in October 2013, the song also peaked at number 1 on the UK Dance Chart. "Powerless" received a full single release on 23 February 2014. The song peaked at number 73 on the UK Singles Chart. Hill appeared on and co-wrote a vocal version of Oliver Heldens' "Gecko", renamed "Gecko (Overdrive)", alongside MNEK. The song topped the UK Singles Chart on 29 June 2014 thus making her the first The Voice UK contestant to achieve a number 1.

In 2014 she released the singles "Caution to the Wind" and "Losing" with Parlophone Records for an intended debut album, but she was dropped the same year. "Losing" debuted and peaked at number 56 on the UK Singles Chart. Hill co-wrote Australian recording artist Reigan Derry's debut single "All of the Pieces". In July 2015, French house producer Watermät released a vocal version of his track "Frequency" with Hill as a joint lead artist. The track was renamed to "All My Love".

In early 2016, Hill announced that she was songwriting with CocknBullKid. In May 2016 she released her first proper single in two years, entitled "Back to My Love", featuring vocals from rapper Little Simz. It was said to be the lead single off of her debut album, but was later included in the Eko EP, released in August 2017. During the summer, she collaborated with a number of artists. Her first was with DJ and record producer MK on his single "Piece of Me". The second was with Matoma on his breakthrough single "False Alarm". In the late months of 2016, she announced a second single from her EP, entitled "Warm". It was co-written with MNEK and produced by Shift K3Y. In the end of March 2017, she released a third single, entitled "Rude Love". The song was co-written and produced by MNEK. The music video was released in April alongside the launch of her official Vevo channel on YouTube.

In May 2017, Hill signed a worldwide publishing deal with Sony/ATV Music Publishing and also guest presented an episode of CBBC's The Playlist. Following from this, Hill released a fourth single "Unpredictable" from the Eko EP, along with the EP itself in August 2017 as the final release from her own independent label Eko Music Limited. "Unpredictable" was co-written by Karen Poole and MNEK, who also produced the track.

=== 2017–2019: Get to Know ===
In August 2017, she signed a record deal with Polydor Records, and announced plans for a debut album expected to release in 2018. Her first single with Polydor, titled "Sunrise in the East", was released in 2018,. Not long after, she appeared on songs including "Back & Forth", alongside MK and Jonas Blue. This continued in the following year with "I Could Get Used to This", with Weiss, and finally "Wish You Well", with Sigala, which became her first top 10 hit in the UK Charts since "Gecko (Overdrive)". She was one of seven co-writers of the Europa song "All Day and Night", which was her composer credit to make it to the top 10 in the UK Charts. On 6 July 2019, Hill performed at Pride in London on the Trafalgar Square stage. A "mini-album", Get to Know, with four new tracks, was released in September 2019. The four tracks were from an intended EP, Fickle Emotions, that had not been released.

On 6 December 2019, Hill released a cover of the Yazoo song "Only You", dedicated to her grandfather, who had introduced her to The Flying Pickets' cover version of the song when she was young.

=== 2020–2022: Only Honest on the Weekend ===
At the beginning of 2020, Hill supported Irish pop rock band The Script on their Sunsets & Full Moons tour in the UK and Ireland and performed some of her songs from Get to Know. In late March of that year, the rest of the dates were cancelled due to the COVID-19 pandemic.

She released the next singles from her debut album Only Honest on the Weekend; "Better Off Without You" with Shift K3Y and "Heaven on My Mind" with Sigala, both of which reached number fourteen on the UK Singles Chart. Follow up single "Space" peaked at seventy-nine, though this later did not make the final tracklist.

In April, she collaborated with Tiesto on the song "Nothing Really Matters" which was later released through Tiesto's seventh album The London Sessions, where she featured on another song called "Over You". In June, she premiered a Spotify podcast called "The Art of Rave" with features such as Pete Tong, Sister Bliss and DJ Zinc.

In November, she covered Alphaville's "Forever Young" for the UK's McDonald's Christmas advert. The track became her first song without a joint credit to reach the UK Top 40, when it peaked at number thirty-five.

Beginning in 2021, Hill released the singles "Last Time" and "Remember" with French DJ David Guetta. They peaked at number thirty-nine and number three respectively, the latter becoming Hill's fourth top-ten hit.

On 15 July 2021, Hill teased the release of her debut album, Only Honest on the Weekend, with a trailer on her Instagram featuring previously unreleased songs "My Heart Goes (La Di Da)" with Topic and "Through the Night" with 220 Kid. The tracklist was later confirmed in full by Official Charts. The album was originally planned to be released on 20 August 2021. Hill explained that the album would be delayed 1 week, and released on 27 August 2021 to let "My Heart Goes (La Di Da)" shine on the UK charts. Released as the final single from the album, the song spent four weeks at number 11 becoming Hill's ninth top-20 single.

Additionally, on 25 August 2021, days before the release of Only Honest on the Weekend, a "Kiss My (Uh Oh)" Girl Power Remix was released that Hill featured on along with Anne-Marie, Little Mix, Raye and Stefflon Don.

On 25 January 2022, Hill announced that she will release a song with Wilkinson 9 years after their previous hit "Afterglow". The song is called "Here For You" and it was released on 11 February 2022. She later released "Run", a collaboration with Swedish EDM duo Galantis was released on 25 February 2022. This was followed by a deluxe edition of her debut album Only Honest on the Weekend. It included singles "Space", "Run" with Galantis, "Hold On" with Netsky and "Here For You" with Wilkinson, the song "Personally" and the acoustic version of "Remember".

On 8 April 2022, Hill collaborated with David Guetta and Ella Henderson on the song "Crazy What Love Can Do". In July 2022, she performed at the closing ceremony of UEFA Women's Euro 2022 at Wembley Stadium, after which she was trolled online due to the silver leotard she wore for the performance. She also performed during the beach volleyball events at the 2022 Commonwealth Games in Birmingham.

On 5 August 2022, Hill collaborated with British DJ Joel Corry on the song "History".

=== 2023–2025: Believe Me Now? ===
On 2 May 2023, Hill announced "Side Effects", a collaboration with Lewis Thompson, as the lead single from her, back-then, upcoming second studio album. It was released on 12 May, and peaked at number 35 on the UK Singles Chart. She later confirmed the album was scheduled for release in 2024. On 14 July, Hill released "Disconnect" with English DJ duo Chase & Status as the second single from her sophomore album. The song became her sixth top ten hit in the UK.

In January 2024, Hill toured New Zealand and Australia for the first time, performing shows in Auckland, Melbourne and Sydney. While on tour, she released the single "Never Be Alone", which features Australian-born DJ Sonny Fodera. On 28 March, Hill released the song "Outside of Love" as the album’s fourth single. On 1 May, "Right Here" was released as the fifth single from the album. On 24 May, Hill released the song "True Colours" with British singer-songwriter Self Esteem as the sixth single from the album.

Hill's second studio album, titled Believe Me Now? was officially released on 31 May, alongside a seventh single, "Multiply". On 29 November, Hill released a remix version of "Swim" with American DJ and producer MK as the eighth single from the album.

In 2025, Hill re-issued the album, including a new song titled "Indestructible" with Andy C. That same year, she collaborated with Swedish DJ Alesso, on the track "Surrender". On 26 September, it was announced that Hill would be supporting American singer Katy Perry on her European leg of The Lifetimes Tour.

=== 2026–present: Rebecca ===
On 13 April 2026, Hill teased the song "Hands On Me" as the lead single from her upcoming third studio album. The song was released on 29 April. On 13 May 2026, Hill announced that she will release the single "More! More! More!" on 27 May 2026. On the same day as the single's premiere, Hill announced the title of her third studio album, Rebecca. On 10 September 2026, Hill delayed the album to 13 November 2026.

== Artistry ==
=== Style ===
Music critics generally describe Hill's music style as pop, dance, drum and bass, dance-pop, and house.

=== Influences ===
Hill has cited a range of electropop, and indie pop acts as major musical influences. In an interview with The Line of Best Fit, she named Robyn, Ellie Goulding, La Roux, and Passion Pit as key inspirations, noting that such artists "have made pop cool" by blending a range of left-field genres. Hill stated that for her first album she aspired to achieve an "energetic and quirky" sound similar to Pit and Goulding, while also aiming to write "beautiful songs" in the style of Bon Iver, and Ben Howard.

She expressed admiration for dance-pop producers MNEK, Cashmere Cat, Shy FX, pop singer Ariana Grande, as well drum and bass vocalist Jenna G, and for the songwriting of American rapper Will.i.am, naming Elephunk as one of her ideal pop records, alongside Maroon 5's Songs About Jane, Gavin DeGraw's Chariot, and Lauryn Hill's The Miseducation of Lauryn Hill.

== Personal life ==
In April 2021, Hill came out as queer on her Twitter account, stating "I've definitely felt uncomfortable branding myself as straight, or anything else for that matter, but queer seems to be the most fitting identity for who I am". In January 2022, Hill announced her engagement to her long-term boyfriend. The couple married on 12 September 2025 at a hotel in Falmouth, Cornwall.

She is a supporter of Walsall F.C.

== Discography ==
Studio albums

- Only Honest on the Weekend (2021)
- Believe Me Now? (2024)
- Rebecca (2026)

== Tour ==
=== Headlining ===
- Becky Hill Tour 2021 (2021–2022)
- Believe Me Now? Tour (2024)

=== Supporting ===
- Katy Perry - The Lifetimes Tour (2025)

== Awards and nominations ==
Award	Year	Nominee(s)	Category	Result	Ref.
ASCAP London Music Awards	2017	"False Alarm"	Award-Winning EDM Song	Won	
ASCAP London Music Awards	2021	"Lose Control"	Award-Winning EDM Song	Won	
Berlin Music Video Awards	2014	"Powerless" (with Rudimental)	Best Editor	Nominated	
Brit Awards	2022	"Remember" (with David Guetta)	Song of the Year	Nominated	
Brit Awards	2022	Herself	Best Dance Act	Won	
Brit Awards	2023	Herself	Best Dance Act	Won	
Brit Awards	2024	Herself	Best Dance Act	Nominated	
Brit Awards	2025	Herself	Best Dance Act	Nominated	
British LGBT Awards	2023	Herself	Music Artist	Won	
British Phonographic Industry	2023	Herself	Brits Billion Award	Won	
Electronic Dance Music Awards	2022	"My Heart Goes (La Di Da)" (with Topic)	UK House Song of the Year	Nominated	
Electronic Dance Music Awards	2022	Herself	Best Vocalist	Nominated	
Electronic Dance Music Awards	2023	Herself	Best Vocalist	Nominated	
Electronic Dance Music Awards	2023	"History" (with Joel Corry)	Dance Song Of The Year (Radio)	Nominated	
Electronic Dance Music Awards	2023	"Crazy What Love Can Do" (with David Guetta and Ella Henderson)	Music Video of the Year	Nominated	
Electronic Dance Music Awards	2024	Herself	Vocalist of the Year	Nominated	
Gaydio Awards	2024	Herself	Music Artist of the Year	Won	
Global Awards	2022	Herself	Rising Star	Nominated	
Global Awards	2022	Herself	Best Female	Nominated	
Global Awards	2022	Herself	Best Pop Act	Nominated	
Global Awards	2022	Herself	Best British Act	Nominated	
Global Awards	2023	Herself	Best British Act	Nominated	
Global Awards	2023	Herself	Best Female	Nominated	
LOS40 Music Awards	2022	"Crazy What Love Can Do" (with David Guetta and Ella Henderson)	Best International Collaboration	Won	
LOS40 Music Awards	2022	"Crazy What Love Can Do" (with David Guetta and Ella Henderson)	Best International Video	Nominated	
MOBO Awards	2014	"Powerless" (with Rudimental)	Best Video	Nominated	
MTV Brand New	2015	Herself	Brand New For 2015	Nominated	
Music Week Awards	2023	Becky Hill x Stefflon Don x Ultra Naté x Pepsi MAX – UEFA Women's EURO 2022 Final Show	Music & Brand Partnership	Nominated	
Popjustice £20 Music Prize	2015	"Losing"	Best British Pop Single	Nominated	
Spellemannprisen	2016	"False Alarm"	Song of the Year	Nominated	
UK Music Video Awards	2014	"Powerless" (with Rudimental)	Best Urban Video - UK	Nominated	
