= Believe Me Now? =

Studio album by Becky Hill
- Released: 31 May 2024
- Genres: Dance; pop
- Length: 44:45
- Label: Polydor
- Producers: Neave Applebaum; Chase & Status; MJ Cole; Sonny Fodera; Scott Lowe; Maur; Parisi; Mark Ralph; Jon Shave; Lewis Thompson; Luke Storrs; Toddla T

Becky Hill chronology
Christmas (2021)	Believe Me Now? (2024)	Rebecca (2026)

Singles from Believe Me Now?
- 1. "Side Effects" Released: 12 May 2023; 2. "Disconnect" Released: 14 July 2023; 3. "Never Be Alone" Released: 19 January 2024; 4. "Outside of Love" Released: 28 March 2024; 5. "Right Here" Released: 1 May 2024; 6. "True Colours" Released: 24 May 2024; 7. "Multiply" Released: 31 May 2024; 8. "Swim" Released: 29 November 2024

Believe Me Now? is the second studio album by English singer-songwriter Becky Hill, released on 31 May 2024 through Polydor Records. It features collaborations with Self Esteem, Sonny Fodera, Lewis Thompson, Rileasa, and Chase & Status.

== Background ==
Speaking with Ali Shutler for NME magazine about the process of the album, Hill stated:

"I didn't want people asking, 'Who the fuck is Becky Hill?' but I've become this person that knows exactly who she is. I don't need to downplay myself or my abilities because I finally believe in myself. You can hear that on this record."

She also confirmed that artists and producers such as Parisi, Mark Ralph, Toddla T, Maur, Solardo, MJ Cole, Jax Jones, Franky Wah, Lewis Thompson, Sonny Fodera and Chase & Status would be featured on the album.

== Release and promotion ==
Believe Me Now? was released through Eko and Polydor Records on 31 May 2024. It will be available on streaming, digital download, CD, and various vinyl LP variants.

=== Singles ===
The album's lead single "Side Effects", a Lewis Thompson-assisted track was released on 12 May 2023. The track peaked at number 35 on UK chart and 12 on UK Dance chart respectively.

The second single "Disconnect", a collaboration with an English electronic music duo Chase & Status was released on 14 July 2023. The song peaked at number six on the UK Singles Chart, becoming Hill's sixth and Chase & Status' fifth top-10 single respectively.

"Never Be Alone" was released as the album's third single on 19 January 2024. The song peaked at number 23 on the UK Singles Chart, becoming Hill's 19th and Fodera's second top-40 single, respectively.

"Outside of Love" was released as the album's fourth single on 28 March 2024. with an accompanying music video being released at the same day. The track peaked at number 54 on UK Singles Chart.

On 1 May 2024, "Right Here" was released as the fifth single from the album.

On 24 May 2024, Hill released the song "True Colours" with British singer-songwriter Self Esteem as the sixth single from the album.

"Multiply" was released on 31 May 2024 as the album's seventh single. A "rave edit" of the song was released on 5 July 2024, followed by a CamrinWatsin remix the following week.

On 29 November 2024, Hill released a remix version of "Swim" with American DJ and producer MK as the eighth single from the album.

=== Live performances ===
Hill performed "Disconnect" alongside Chase & Status at the Brit Awards 2024 ceremony on 2 March. She included "Disconnect", "Never Be Alone", "Outside of Love", "Right Here", and "True Colours" as part of her setlist during BBC Radio 1's Big Weekend at Stockwood Park in Luton on 24 May.

== Critical reception ==
Professional ratings
Review scores
Source	Rating
The Arts Desk	4/5 stars
Buzz Magazine	4/5 stars
iNews	4/5 stars
Riff Magazine	8/10

Ed Power for iNews called the record a heartfelt and courageous album, stating that with her second studio album Hill is "a force to be reckoned with in her own right", and named the tracks "True Colours" and "Lonely Again" as the album highlights. Mike DeWald for Riff Magazine praised Becky Hill's "immense" growth as an artist and vocalist, declaring that with her second album Believe Me Now? Hill "finds her voice and carves out her own space in the pop landscape", as well calling Hill a "pop vocal powerhouse with plenty on her mind". He went further saying that Hill's provides "a high-flying record that achieves both singalongs and memorable dance floor bangers" and praised the solid songwriting.

Joe Muggs for The Arts Desk praised Believe Me Now? for making Hill stand-out from her contemporaries musicians in the dance pop scene, showcasing a "distinct musical identity" which is back-up with "sheer force of personality". Muggs concluded his review saying that this is an album that "powers along on adrenaline and palpable, lived emotion". and named Hill "the real deal".

== Track listing ==
Believe Me Now? track listing
No.	Title	Writer(s)	Producer(s)	Length
1.	"True Colours" (featuring Self Esteem)	Rebecca Claire Hill; Lauren Aquilina; Uzoechi Emenike; Jack Patterson; Mark Ralph	Mark Ralph	3:51
2.	"Darkest Hour"	Hill; Ralph; Luke Storrs; Emenike; Scott Lowe; Robert Harvey	Ralph; Scott Lowe; Luke Storrs; MNEK^{[v]}	3:17
3.	"Outside of Love"	Hill; Giampaolo Parisi; Marco Parisi; Charlotte Haining; Mike Kintish	Parisi; Ralph^{[a]}; Ryan Ashley^{[v]}	2:55
4.	"Never Be Alone" (featuring Sonny Fodera)	Hill; Sonny Fodera; Karen Poole; Daniel Thomas Clare; Dylan Lewis Nile May; Mark Foster	Fodera; Ralph; Maur^{[a]}; Ashley^{[v]}	3:09
5.	"Multiply"	Hill; Haining; Emily Makis; Kieron McIntosh; Neave Applebaum	Ralph; Neave Applebaum; MNEK^{[v]}	2:28
6.	"Swim"	Hill; Poole; Clare; May; McIntosh; Harvey	Ralph; Maur	3:32
7.	"Man of My Dreams"	Hill; Poole; Matt Coleman	MJ Cole; Ashley^{[v]}	2:58
8.	"Linger"	Hill; Ralph; Haining; Makis; McIntosh; Harvey	Ralph; Dennis White^{[a]}	2:56
9.	"Lonely Again"	Hill; Ralph; Sophie Frances Cooke; Timucin Lam	Ralph; MNEK^{[v]}	3:50
10.	"Side Effects" (with Lewis Thompson)	Hill; Poole; Emenike; Lewis Thompson	Jon Shave; Thompson; Adria Alemany Garcia^{[a]}; MNEK^{[v]}	2:33
11.	"Back Around"	Hill; Poole; Thompson; Clementine Douglas	Thompson; T.Williams^{[a]}	2:36
12.	"Keep Holding On"	Hill; Haining; Adrian McLeod; Thomas Mackenzie Bell; Tom Mann	Toddla T; MNEK^{[v]}	2:13
13.	"One Track Mind" (featuring Rileasa)	Hill; Clare; May; Makis; Ralph; Emenike; Rileasa	Ralph; Maur; MNEK^{[v]}	2:44
14.	"Disconnect" (with Chase & Status)	Hill; Saul Milton; William Kennard; Poole; Makis; McIntosh	Chase & Status^{[p]}; McIntosh^{[a]}; Vula Malinga^{[v]}	2:44
15.	"Indestructible (Note: "Indestructible" appears as part of the digital platform reissue for Believe Me Now?)" (with Andy C)	Hill; Andrew Michael Clarke; Tom Aspaul; Ryan Ashley	Andy C	2:41
16.	"Right Here"	Hill; Milton; Kennard; McIntosh	Chase & Status	2:59
Total length:				47:26

Note

- ^{^[p]} signifies a primary and vocal producer
- ^{^[a]} signifies an additional producer
- ^{^[v]} signifies a vocal producer

== Personnel ==
Musicians

- Becky Hill – lead vocals (all tracks), background vocals (track 10)
- Mark Ralph – programming, synthesizer (tracks 1–9)
- Jack Patterson – programming, synthesizer (track 1)
- Self Esteem – vocals (track 1)
- Scott Lowe – bass (track 2)
- The Heritage Orchestra (Note: The Heritage Orchestra consists of cellists Jonny Byers, Nerys Richards, and Tim Lowe; violists Meghan Cassidy, Rachel Robson, and Sarah Chapman; and violinists Charis Jenson, Ciaran McCabe, Emma Parker, Martyn Jackson, Michael Jones, Millie Ashton, Nicky Sweeney, Paddy Roberts, and Žanete Uskane.) – strings (tracks 3, 7)
- Giampaolo Parisi – bass, drums, percussion, sound effects (track 3)
- Marco Parisi – keyboards, piano, synthesizer (track 3)
- Sonny Fodera – keyboards (track 4)
- Neave Applebaum – bass, drums, keyboards (track 5)
- MJ Cole – piano (track 7)
- MNEK – background vocals (track 10)
- John Smith – bass, electric guitar (track 10)
- Lewis Thompson – keyboards, programming, synthesizer (tracks 10, 11); drum programming (10), bass (11)
- Adrian Mcleod – piano, synth bass, synth pads (track 12)
- Toddla T – drum programming, programming (track 12)
- Deli OneFourz – additional vocals (track 12)
- Rileasa – vocals (track 13)
- Kieran Mcintosh – keyboards (track 14)

Technical

- Matt Colton – mastering (tracks 1–9, 11–13)
- Kevin Grainger – mastering, mixing (track 10)
- Chase & Status – mastering, mixing, engineering (track 14, 15)
- Mark Ralph – mixing (tracks 1–9, 11–13)
- Josh Green – engineering (tracks 1–9, 11–13)
- Gemma Chester – engineering assistance (tracks 1–9, 11–13)
- Chris Wheeler – string arrangement (tracks 3, 7)
- Clementine Douglas – vocal arrangement (track 11)

== Charts ==
Chart performance for Believe Me Now?
Chart (2024)	Peak position
Belgian Albums (Ultratop Flanders)	177
Irish Albums (IRMA)	54
New Zealand Albums (RMNZ)	29
Scottish Albums (Official Charts)	7
UK Albums (Official Charts)	3
UK Dance Albums (Official Charts)	1

== Certifications ==
Region	Certification	Certified units/sales
New Zealand (RMNZ)	Gold	7,500^{‡}
United Kingdom (BPI)	Gold	100,000^{‡}
^{‡} Sales+streaming figures based on certification alone.

== Release history ==
Release history and formats for Believe Me Now?
Region	Date	Format(s)	Label(s)	Ref.
Various	31 May 2024	CD; digital download; streaming; vinyl LP	Polydor; Eko	
