= 17 (MK song) =

Single by MK

from the album In the Night Again
- Released: September 1, 2017
- Recorded: 2017
- Genre: House
- Length: 3:16
- Label: Area 10; Columbia
- Songwriters: Carla Monroe; Dave Whelan; Marc Kinchen; Mike Di Scala
- Producers: MK; CamelPhat

MK singles chronology
"My Love 4 U" (2016)	"17" (2017)	"Back & Forth" (2018)

Music video
- "17" on YouTube

"17" is a song by American DJ MK featuring uncredited vocals by British singer Carla Monroe, released as a single on September 1, 2017. It peaked at number seven in the UK, making it one of MK's second-highest charting two singles there alongside "Asking" with Sonny Fodera featuring Clementine Douglas which also peaked at number seven after "Dior" featuring Chrystal which topped that country's singles chart. The song has been included on various music compilations such as The Annual 2018 and Now 98.

== Music video ==
An official lyric video was uploaded on YouTube to MK's Vevo channel on September 1, 2017. The official music video was released to the same place two months later on November 6, 2017. The video, directed by Francis Wallis, depicts people dancing in the Kuduro style, and was shot over 2 days in Lisbon, Portugal. Goncalo Cabral, the dance choreographer, is also the lead dancer. As of August 6, 2024, the video has over 4,550,000 views. This video was also uploaded on Ultra Music's YouTube channel, and as of the same date, has more than 6,300,000 views.

== Track listing ==
Digital download
No.	Title	Length
1.	"17"	3:16

== Charts ==
=== Weekly charts ===
Chart (2017–18)	Peak position
Belgium Dance (Ultratop Flanders)	40
Czech Republic Airplay (ČNS IFPI)	44
Ireland (IRMA)	9
Mexico Airplay (Billboard)	32
Scottish Singles Sales (Official Charts)	4
UK Singles (Official Charts)	7
UK Dance (UK Dance Singles Chart)	1
US Dance Club Songs (Billboard)	6
US Hot Dance/Electronic Songs (Billboard)	25

=== Year-end charts ===
Chart (2018)	Position
UK Singles (Official Charts Company)	56
US Hot Dance/Electronic Songs (Billboard)	71

== Certifications ==
Region	Certification	Certified units/sales
Australia (ARIA)	Gold	35,000^{‡}
Canada (Music Canada)	Gold	40,000^{‡}
New Zealand (RMNZ)	Gold	15,000^{‡}
United Kingdom (BPI)	3× Platinum	1,800,000^{‡}
^{‡} Sales+streaming figures based on certification alone.

== Release history ==
Country	Date	Format	Label
United Kingdom	September 1, 2017	Digital download; streaming	Area 10; Columbia
