= Outside of Love =

Single by Becky Hill

from the album Believe Me Now?
- Released: 28 March 2024
- Length: 2:55
- Label: Polydor
- Composer(s): Becky Hill; Giampaolo Parisi; Marco Parisi; Charlotte Haining; Mike Kintish
- Producer(s): Parisi

Becky Hill singles chronology
"Never Be Alone" (2024)	"Outside of Love" (2024)	"Right Here" (2024)

"Outside of Love" is a song by English singer-songwriter Becky Hill, released on 28 March 2024, through Polydor Records as the fourth single from her second studio album, Believe Me Now? (2024). It was written by Hill, Giampaolo Parisi, Marco Parisi, Charlotte Haining and Mike Kintish, and produced by PARISI.

== Composition ==
In an interview with Emma Wilkes for NME, Hill said about the track: "I really hope people connect to this frustrated and isolated love song and still feel like they wanna dance their way through the shared sadness".

== Promotion ==
An accompanying music video was released alongside the song the same day, 28 March 2024. The music video was directed by Michael Holyk, an often collaborator of Hill. The music video was filmed in Slovenia. A rave edit of the track was also made available the same day.

== Critical reception ==
"Outside of Love" was met with positive reviews by music critics. Dom Vigil of Prelude Press praised the track stating that the song: "sees Becky at her best: dancefloor-igniting electronica inspired by her underground roots, infused with an arena-filling infectiousness". Emma Wilkes of NME dubbed the song as a "big, anthemic" track. Likewise, Liam Cattermole of Notion also described the track as "anthemic" and praised Hill's "powerhouse vocals".

== Personnel ==
- Becky Hill – vocals, songwriter
- Giampaolo Parisi – producer, songwriter, keyboards, synthesiser, drums, bass, sound effects, piano, percussion
- Marco Parisi – producer, songwriter, keyboards, synthesiser, drums, bass, sound effects, piano, percussion
- Charlotte Haining – songwriter
- Mike Kintish – songwriter
- Chris Wheeler – string arranger, performer
- Mark Ralph – additional producer, mixing engineer, programming, synthesiser
- Ryan Ashley – performer, vocal producer
- Josh Green – engineer
- Gemma Chester – assistant recording engineer
- Matt Colton – mastering engineer
- The Heritage Orchestra – strings
- Tim Lowe – cello
- Jonny Byers – cello
- Nerys Richards – cello
- Meghan Cassidy – viola
- Rachel Robson – viola
- Sarah Chapman – viola
- Millie Ashton – violin
- Paddy Roberts – violin
- Charis Jenson – violin
- Ciaran McCabe – violin
- Martyn Jackson – violin
- Nicky Sweeney – violin
- Michael Jones – violin
- Emma Parker – violin
- Žanete Uskane – violin

== Charts ==
=== Weekly charts ===
Weekly chart performance for "Outside of Love"
Chart (2024–2025)	Peak position
Belarus Airplay (TopHit)	75
Czech Republic (Rádio – Top 100)	13
Kazakhstan Airplay (TopHit)	85
Latvia Airplay (TopHit)	3
Lithuania Airplay (TopHit)	32
Netherlands (Dutch Top 40)	31
New Zealand Hot Singles (RMNZ)	38
Russia Airplay (TopHit)	88
UK Singles (OCC)	54
UK Dance (OCC)	18
US Dance/Mix Show Airplay (Billboard)	4

=== Monthly charts ===
Monthly chart performance for "Outside of Love"
Chart (2024)	Peak position
Belarus Airplay (TopHit)	93
Czech Republic (Rádio Top 100)	17
Latvia Airplay (TopHit)	3
Lithuania Airplay (TopHit)	45

== Certifications ==
Region	Certification	Certified units/sales
United Kingdom (BPI)	Silver	200,000^{‡}
^{‡} Sales+streaming figures based on certification alone.

== Release history ==
Release dates and formats for "Outside of Love'
Region	Date	Format	Label	Ref.
Various	28 March 2024	Digital Download; streaming	Polydor	
