= Carla Monroe =

British singer

Carla Monroe (sometimes credited as Carla Nash) is a British vocalist from East London. She featured on MK's "17" and on D.O.D.'s "Still Sleepless", which peaked at No. 7 and No. 46 on the UK Singles Chart, respectively.

== Life and career ==
=== Early life and 17 ===
Carla Monroe is of Dominican descent, and is from East London. On 1 September 2017, MK released "17", which features uncredited vocals from Monroe; the song had been written four years earlier by Monroe, in her bedroom, about a time when things were difficult. At the time the song was released, Monroe held a day job in a prison. The song charted at No. 7 on the UK Singles Chart. The pair would collaborate again on 24 July 2020 with "2AM", which credited her.

=== Later releases ===
On 2 November 2018, Monroe and Statin released "Apple Juice", and on 1 February 2019 she, Moti, and Thrdlife released "Worst In Me"; she would later collaborate with Moti again on 27 September 2019 with "Tribe". On 15 March 2019, she featured on Sultan + Shepard's "Deeper". On 14 February 2020, she featured on Zookeper's "Rain Drops". On 8 January 2021, she and NERVO released "Gotta Be You", which she, Leftwing: Kody, Camden Cox, and Richard X had written together around a year earlier. On 26 February 2021, she released a solo single, "Shapes"; she wrote the song shortly after the March 2020 UK lockdown, and wrote the verse while queuing to enter a supermarket. She would later release another solo single, "22 Love", on 22 July 2022. On 17 September 2021, she featured on D.O.D.'s "Still Sleepless", which charted at No. 46 on the UK Singles Chart, and spent 23 non-consecutive weeks at the top of the UK Independent Singles Breakers Chart. On 8 April 2022, she and Syn Cole released "Overdrive", and on 31 March 2023, she featured on Sam Green's "Jam Inside Your Love".

== Artistry ==
Monroe sings with heavy vibrato. She has cited Mariah Carey and Sia as inspirations, and been cited as inspiration by Jazzy.
