= Somedays (song) =

Single by Sonny Fodera, Jazzy and D.O.D.

from the EP No Bad Vibes and the album Can We Do It All Again?
- Released: 26 July 2024
- Genre: Dance
- Length: 3:27
- Label: Solotoko
- Songwriters: Sonny Fodera; Clementine Douglas; Yasmine Byrne; D.O.D.
- Producers: Sonny Fodera; D.O.D.

Sonny Fodera singles chronology
"Mind Still" (2024)	"Somedays" (2024)	"Tell Me" (2025)

Jazzy singles chronology
"Make Up" (2024)	"Somedays" (2024)	"The Heat" (2024)

D.O.D. singles chronology
"Paradise" (2024)	"Somedays" (2024)	"Feel the Passion" (2024)

Music video
- "Somedays" on YouTube

"Somedays" is a song by Australian musician Sonny Fodera, Irish singer Jazzy and British DJ and record producer D.O.D. The song was released on 26 July 2024.

At the Brit Awards 2025, it was nominated for Song of the Year.

At the 2025 Electronic Dance Music Awards, the song was nominated for Dance Song of the Year and House Song of the Year.

At the 2025 ARIA Music Awards, the song was nominated for ARIA Award for Song of the Year and ARIA Award for Best Dance Release.

== Track listing ==
Digital download and streaming
No.	Title	Length
1.	"Somedays"	3:27

Digital download and streaming
No.	Title	Length
1.	"Somedays" (MK remix)	3:32

Digital download and streaming
No.	Title	Length
1.	"Somedays" (extended)	5:43

Digital download and streaming
No.	Title	Length
1.	"Somedays" (Dombresky remix)	3:17

Digital download and streaming
No.	Title	Length
1.	"Somedays" (Marten Hørger remix)	3:09

== Charts ==
=== Weekly charts ===
Weekly chart performance for "Somedays"
Chart (2024–2026)	Peak position
Australia (ARIA)	26
Australia Dance (ARIA)	1
Croatia International Airplay (Top lista)	89
Estonia Airplay (TopHit)	169
Honduras Anglo Airplay (Monitor Latino)	8
Ireland (IRMA)	5
Latvia Airplay (LaIPA)	15
Lithuania Airplay (TopHit)	14
New Zealand Hot Singles (RMNZ)	16
Romania Airplay (TopHit)	103
UK Singles (Official Charts)	5
UK Dance (Official Charts)	1
UK Indie (Official Charts)	1
US Hot Dance/Electronic Songs (Billboard)	15

=== Monthly charts ===
Monthly chart performance for "Somedays"
Chart (2024)	Peak position
Lithuania Airplay (TopHit)	17

=== Year-end charts ===
2024 year-end chart performance for "Somedays"
Chart (2024)	Position
Australian Artist (ARIA)	38
UK Singles (OCC)	81

2025 year-end chart performance for "Somedays"
Chart (2025)	Position
Australian Artist (ARIA)	1
Australia (ARIA)	62
UK Singles (OCC)	42
US Hot Dance/Electronic Songs (Billboard)	31

== Certifications ==
Region	Certification	Certified units/sales
Australia (ARIA)	3× Platinum	210,000^{‡}
New Zealand (RMNZ)	Platinum	30,000^{‡}
United Kingdom (BPI)	2× Platinum	1,200,000^{‡}
^{‡} Sales+streaming figures based on certification alone.
