= Never Be Alone (Becky Hill and Sonny Fodera song) =

2024 song by Becky Hill and Sonny Fodera

Single by Becky Hill and Sonny Fodera

from the album Believe Me Now?
- Released: 19 January 2024
- Genre: Dance
- Length: 3:09
- Label: Polydor; Eko
- Songwriters: Becky Hill; Sonny Fodera; Karen Poole; Daniel Thomas Clare; Dylan Lewis Nile May; Mark Foster
- Producers: Sonny Fodera; Mark Ralph; Maur

Becky Hill singles chronology
| "Disconnect" (2023) | "Never Be Alone" (2024) | "Outside of Love" (2024) |

Sonny Fodera singles chronology
| "Levitate" (2023) | "Never Be Alone" (2024) | "Mind Still" (2024) |

"Never Be Alone" is a song by British singer-songwriter Becky Hill and Australian electronic producer Sonny Fodera. It was released on 19 January 2024 through Polydor Records as the third single from her second studio album, Believe Me Now?.

The song peaked at number twenty-three on the UK Singles Chart, becoming Hill's nineteenth and Fodera's second top-forty single respectively.

== Composition ==
The track was written by Becky Hill, Sonny Fodera, Mark Foster, Karen Poole, Daniel Thomas Clare and Dylan Lewis Nile May, and produced by Fodera with Mark Ralph and Maur. In an interview with KISS, Hill stated:

‘Never Be Alone’ was born out of a post lockdown world where isolation and distance were forced upon the world. With my partner and I both being in music, we really felt the full force of an imposed lockdown on the events industry. [...]. What I love about this single is that it has transcended lockdown and feels so relevant still in a time when we need to be there for each other now more than ever. I’ve been playing it in my live sets this summer and it has been a joy watching the crowd’s reaction, but I’m excited to show people what Sonny Fodera has added to this anthem; he’s one of the only people left in the dance space I haven’t collaborated with yet and I can’t wait to release this record alongside him. - Hill, via KISS.

== Promotion ==
To promote the single, several versions were released to streaming platforms, including an extended mix, an orchestral acoustic, and a rave edit of the track were made available. Four remixes were released to promote the track, including remixes by Alcemist, D.O.D, DAIRE, and Taiki Nulight. Alongside releasing her new song, Becky dropped a fire-filled music video, which was shot on location in Morocco’s Agafay Desert just outside Marrakesh. In the video, Becky can be seen moving from daylight to dusk, while the song intensifies and we see her singing surrounded by a ring of fire.

== Critical reception ==
Lewis Mulligan of We Rave You called it "a powerful anthem of hope and resilience" and praised Hill's vocal performance and Fodera's production, stating: "The track is a potent mix of Hill's dancefloor-diva vocals and Fodera's infectious production, with heavyweight dub bass, pounding beats, and luminous synths that build to an exhilarating drop." Maddie Whelan of EDM Maniac described it as "an absolute club and festival banger".

== Track listing ==
- Digital download / streaming
1. "Never Be Alone" – 3:09
- Digital download / streaming – extended mix
1. "Never Be Alone" (extended mix) – 4:05
2. "Never Be Alone" – 3:09
- Digital download / streaming – D.O.D Remix
1. "Never Be Alone" (D.O.D Remix) – 3:13
2. "Never Be Alone" – 3:09
- Digital download / streaming – Rave Edit
1. "Never Be Alone" (Rave Edit) – 2:40
2. "Never Be Alone" – 3:09
- Digital download / streaming – Alcemist Remix
1. "Never Be Alone" (Alcemist Remix) – 3:13
2. "Never Be Alone" – 3:09
- Digital download / streaming – Daire Remix
1. "Never Be Alone" (Daire Remix) – 2:57
2. "Never Be Alone" – 3:09
- Digital download / streaming – Taiki Nulight Remix
1. "Never Be Alone" (Taiki Nulight Remix) – 3:33
2. "Never Be Alone" – 3:09
- Digital download / streaming – orchestral acoustic
1. "Never Be Alone" (orchestral acoustic) – 4:06
2. "Never Be Alone" – 3:09

== Personnel ==
- Becky Hill – performer, songwriter
- Sonny Fodera – performer, producer, songwriter
- Karen Poole – songwriter
- Daniel Thomas Clare – songwriter
- Dylan Lewis Nile May – songwriter
- Mark Foster – songwriter
- Mark Ralph – producer
- Maur – producer

== Charts ==
Chart performance for "Never Be Alone"
| Chart (2024) | Peak position |
|---|---|
| Ireland (IRMA) | 64 |
| New Zealand Hot Singles (RMNZ) | 3 |
| UK Singles (OCC) | 23 |
| UK Dance (OCC) | 8 |
| US Dance/Mix Show Airplay (Billboard) | 1 |

== Certifications ==
| Region | Certification | Certified units/sales |
|---|---|---|
| United Kingdom (BPI) | Silver | 200,000^{‡} |
^{‡} Sales+streaming figures based on certification alone.

== Release history ==
Release dates and formats for "Never Be Alone"
| Region | Date | Format | Version | Label | Ref. |
|---|---|---|---|---|---|
| Various | 19 January 2024 | Digital download; streaming | Original | Polydor | |
| Various | 26 January 2024 | Digital download; streaming | Extended mix | Polydor | |
| Various | 16 February 2024 | Digital download; streaming | D.O.D Remix | Polydor | |
| Various | 23 February 2024 | Digital download; streaming | Rave Edit | Polydor | |
| Various | 1 March 2024 | Digital download; streaming | Alcemist Remix | Polydor | |
| Various | 8 March 2024 | Digital download; streaming | Taiki Nulight Remix | Polydor | |
| Various | 8 March 2024 | Digital download; streaming | Daire Remix | Polydor | |
| Various | 15 March 2024 | Digital download; streaming | Orchestral acoustic | Polydor | |

== See also ==
- List of Billboard number-one dance songs of 2024
