= Can We Do It All Again? =

2026 album by Sonny Fodera

Studio album by Sonny Fodera
- Released: 12 June 2026
- Length: 59:34
- Label: Solotoko
- Producers: Neave Applebaum; Billen Ted; Blyne; Burns; James Carter; Stuart Crichton; D.O.D.; Clementine Douglas; Sonny Fodera; Toby Jacob; Tom Martin; MK; Tim Powell; Punctual

Sonny Fodera chronology
Wide Awake (2021)	Can We Do It All Again? (2026)

Singles from Can We Do It All Again?
- 1. "Asking" Released: 7 July 2023; 2. "Mind Still" Released: 5 April 2024; 3. "Somedays" Released: 26 July 2024; 4. "Tell Me" Released: 7 February 2025; 5. "All This Time" Released: 18 July 2025; 6. "Think About Us" Released: 17 October 2025; 7. "My Loving" Released: 27 February 2026; 8. "Let Me Be in Your Arms" Released: 22 May 2026; 9. "Feel Again" Released: 12 June 2026

Can We Do It All Again? is the sixth studio album by Australian DJ and producer Sonny Fodera. The album was announced on 10 March 2026 and released on 12 June 2026.

Upon announcement, Fodera said on Instagram, "This is from me, for you – for everyone who has been listening, streaming, connecting, downloading, supporting and has joined me on this journey. This album has been 5 years in the making. A lot can happen in 5 years. So, can we do it all again?".

== Critical reception ==
Joe Muggs from The Arts Desk said: "There are pianos and big vocals galore, rippling bits of trance synth that give it an airborne feel, little melodic nods to a K-Klass piano house classic here or an ever-popular Etta James sample there. It's relentlessly hook-hook-hook-hook, absolutely designed to keep a level of euphoria going at all times."

Jo Forrest from Total Ntertaiment said that the album "Showcases the signature groove, depth and uplifting energy that has come to define Sonny Fodera's sound."

== Track listing ==
Can We Do It All Again? track listing
No.	Title	Writer(s)	Producer(s)	Length
1.	"Feel Again"	Sonny Fodera; Matthew Burns; Naji Lomax	Fodera; Burns	3:41
2.	"My Loving" (with Chrystal)	Fodera; Joshua Wilkinson; Chrystal Orchard	Fodera	2:50
3.	"Never Letting Go" (with Sienna Sophia)	Fodera; Karen Poole; Neave Applebaum; Sienna Crowson	Fodera; Applebaum	3:06
4.	"Let Me Be in Your Arms" (with Libianca)	Fodera; Rachel Keen; Samuel Brennan; Tom Hollings; Libianca Fonji	Fodera; Billen Ted	3:13
5.	"Think About Us" (with D.O.D. and Poppy Baskcomb)	Fodera; O'Donnell; Stuart Crichton; Poppy Baskcomb; John Morgan; William Lansley	Fodera; D.O.D.; Crichton; Punctual	2:58
6.	"Look" (with Takura and Gia Koka)	Fodera; Tobias Jacob; Takura Tendayi; Natalia Koronowska	Fodera; Toby Jacob	2:46
7.	"Somedays" (with D.O.D. and Jazzy)	Fodera; O'Donnell; Clementine Douglas; Yasmine Byrne	Fodera; D.O.D.	3:27
8.	"Only Thing That Matters" (with Hayla)	Fodera; Jantine Annika Heij; Timothy Powell; Hayley Philipa Williams	Fodera; Powell	4:12
9.	"Tell Me" (with Clementine Douglas)	Fodera; Ruth-Anne Cunningham; Crichton; Douglas	Fodera; Crichton; Douglas	3:17
10.	"On My Mind" (with J00i)	Fodera; Sara Hartman; Nikolai Potthoff; Andrew Tyler	Fodera	3:07
11.	"All This Time" (with Jazzy)	Fodera; Douglas; Poole; Byrne	Fodera	3:43
12.	"Asking" (with MK and Clementine Douglas)	Fodera; Marc Kinchen; Douglas	Fodera; MK	3:11
13.	"Love on Fire" (with Lilly Ahlberg)	Fodera; Conran Williams-Lee; Rhett Williams-Lee; Lilly Ahlberg	Fodera	3:25
14.	"Cross the Line" (with Hayley May)	Fodera; Philip Strand; Hayley May	Fodera	3:40
15.	"After Hours" (with Julia Church)	Fodera; Edward Jenkins; Julia Church	Fodera	4:09
16.	"Close to You" (with Caroline Byrne)	Fodera; Yaroslav Polikarpov; Caroline Byrne	Fodera	3:47
17.	"Mind Still" (featuring Blythe)	Fodera; Issey Cross; Jan Hammele; Andreas Huber	Fodera; Blyne	2:36
18.	"Hits" (with James Carter and Elsie)	Fodera; James Carter; Edward Leithead-Docherty; Thomas Leithead-Docherty; Elsa Søllesvik	Fodera; Carter; Tom Martin	2:26
Total length:				59:34

== Personnel ==
Credits are adapted from Tidal.

- Ollie Knight – mixing (tracks 1–4, 7–18)
- Cass Irvine – mastering (1–4, 7–18)
- Kevin Grainger – mixing, mastering (5)
- Jazzy – vocals (7, 11)
- Clementine Douglas – vocals (7, 11)
- Stuart Crichton – synthesizer (9)
- Claire Habbershaw – piano (11)
- Sylvia Mwenze – vocals (11)
- Amber Fodera – vocals (12)

== Charts ==
Chart performance for Can We Do It All Again?
Chart (2026)	Peak position
Australian Albums (ARIA)	49
Australian Dance Albums (ARIA)	4
Irish Albums (IRMA)	95
Irish Independent Albums (IRMA)	7
UK Albums (Official Charts)	20
UK Dance Albums (Official Charts)	2
UK Independent Albums (Official Charts)	6
