= Wide Awake (Sonny Fodera album) =

2021 album by Sonny Fodera

Studio album by Sonny Fodera
- Released: 22 October 2021
- Length: 51:18
- Label: Solotoko
- Producer: Sonny Fodera; Kolidescopes; Theo Doukanis; Jin Jin; Clementine Douglas; Steve Manovski; Diplo; MK; Toby Scott; Paul Harris; Punctual; Vintage Culture; Ollie Knight

Sonny Fodera chronology
Rise (2019)	Wide Awake (2021)	Can We Do It All Again? (2026)

Singles from Wide Awake
- 1. "One Night" Released: November 2019; 2. "Wired" Released: 9 October 2020; 3. "Turn Back Time" Released: 20 November 2020; 4. "Nah" Released: July 2021; 5. "Angel" Released: 8 September 2021; 6. "Last Thought" Released: 2 October 2021; 7. "You" Released: 22 October 2021

Wide Awake is the fifth studio album by Australian DJ and producer Sonny Fodera. The album was announced on 8 September 2021 and released on 22 October 2021.

A deluxe edition was released in April 2022, featuring three additional tracks.

== Reception ==
Carlie Belbin from EDM called it "his most ambitious record to date".

== Track listing ==
Wide Awake – Standard edition
No.	Title	Writer(s)	Producer(s)	Length
1.	"You" (featuring Sam Tompkins)	Sonny Fodera; Theodoulos Doukanaris; Samuel Tompkins; Janee Bennett	Fodera; Theo Doukanis; Jin Jin^{[v]}	3:25
2.	"Angel" (featuring Clementine Douglas)	Fodera; Clementine Douglas	Fodera; Douglas	3:09
3.	"Nah" (with Kolidescopes and featuring Sinéad Harnett)	Fodera; Jonathan Courtidis; Daniel Dare; Grace Barker; Sinéad Harnett	Fodera; Kolidescopes	2:49
4.	"So High" (featuring Dan Caplen)	Fodera; Roxanne Emery; Jan Postma; Jordi de Fluiter; Daniel Caplen	Fodera; Steve Manovski^{[v]}	2:59
5.	"Turn Back Time" (with Diplo)	Fodera; Thomas Pentz; Alexandra Yatchenko; Henry Agincourt Allen	Fodera; Diplo	2:27
6.	"Something About You" (with Camden Cox and Yeah Boy)	Fodera; Courtidis; Camden Milligan-Cox; Nicholas Schneider	Fodera; Yeah Boy	2:45
7.	"Wide Awake" (featuring Laura Welsh)	Fodera; Raphaella Mazaheri-Asadi; Laura Welsh	Fodera	3:00
8.	"One Night" (with MK and featuring Raphaélla)	Fodera; Marc Kinchen; Mazaheri-Asadi	Fodera; MK	2:41
9.	"Silhouettes" (featuring Poppy Baskcomb)	Fodera; Poppy Baskcomb; Toby Le Messurier Scott; Paul Harris	Fodera; Harris; Scott	2:36
10.	"Stuck in My Head" (with Punctual and featuring Rug Wilson)	Fodera; John Morgan; William Lansley; Matthew "Rug" Wilson; Corey Sanders	Fodera; Punctual	3:01
11.	"Last Thought" (with Vintage Culture and featuring MKLA)	Fodera; Lukas Hesponhol-Ruiz; Adam Kershen; Andrew Polychronopoulos; Andrew Bullimore; Ryan Hartwing; Michaela Osborne	Fodera; Vintage Culture	3:58
12.	"Next 2 U" (featuring Sinéad Harnett and Bru-C)	Fodera; Harnett; Joshua Bruce	Fodera	2:55
13.	"Selfish" (featuring Kelli-Leigh and YOU)	Fodera; Bullimore; Kelli-Leigh Henry-Glover	Fodera; Ollie Knight^{[a]}	3:25
14.	"Wired" (with Ella Eyre)	Fodera; Ella McMahon; Bennett; Thomas Barnes; Peter Kelleher; Benjamin Kohn	Fodera	3:22
Total length:				42:32

Deluxe edition
No.	Title	Writer(s)	Producer(s)	Length
1.	"Be My One" (with Kolidescopes and Hayley May)	Fodera; Courtidis; Dare; Barker	Fodera; Kolidescopes	2:22
2.	"All I Need" (featuring Alex Mills)	Fodera; Alexandra Mills	Fodera	3:26
3.	"Phases"	Fodera; Wilkinson; Conor Manning; Jordan Shaw	Fodera	2:58
Total length:				51:18

Notes

- ^{^[a]} signifies an additional producer.
- ^{^[v]} signifies a vocal producer.

== Charts ==
Chart performance for Wide Awake
Chart (2021)	Peak position
UK Albums (OCC)	47
UK Dance Albums (OCC)	3
UK Independent Albums (OCC)	6
