= Frequently Flying =

2016 album by Sonny Fodera

Studio album by Sonny Fodera
- Released: 11 November 2016
- Length: 63:33
- Label: Defected
- Producer: Sonny Fodera

Sonny Fodera chronology
| After Parties & Aeroplanes (2014) | Frequently Flying (2016) | Rise (2019) |

Singles from Frequently Flying
- 1. "You & I" Released: October 2016; 2. "Caught Up" Released: February 2017; 3. "Always Gonna Be" Released: May 2017

Frequently Flying is the third studio album by Australian DJ and producer Sonny Fodera. It is the first and only album released by Fodera on the Defected Records label. It was announced in August 2016 and released on 11 November 2016.

About the album, Fodera said, "I wanted to create something that wavers in and out of the usual late-night club scene, where you can enjoy the music anywhere."

The album contains 14 tracks, including the previously released singles "Roll with Me", "Feeling U" and "Over This".

== Track listing ==
Frequently Flying track listing
| No. | Title | Length |
|---|---|---|
| 1. | "You & I" (featuring Janai) | 5:17 |
| 2. | "Caught Up" (featuring Yasmeen) | 4:29 |
| 3. | "Never Lies" | 4:43 |
| 4. | "To Love" (featuring Shannon Saunders) | 4:20 |
| 5. | "Wasted" (featuring Kate Elsworth) | 3:32 |
| 6. | "Roll with Me" (featuring Kwame) | 4:31 |
| 7. | "Always Gonna Be" (with James Shoji and featuring Alex Mills) | 4:04 |
| 8. | "All the Reasons" (featuring Janai) | 5:54 |
| 9. | "Feeling U" (featuring Yasmin) | 4:51 |
| 10. | "Over This" (featuring Shannon Saunders) | 4:51 |
| 11. | "Time with You" (featuring Kate Elsworth) | 4:41 |
| 12. | "Promises" (featuring Richard Walters) | 4:12 |
| 13. | "Every Second" | 5:11 |
| 14. | "Recollections" | 2:57 |
| Total length: | | 63:33 |

Frequently Flying (Deluxe) track listing
| No. | Title | Length |
|---|---|---|
| 15. | "Feeling U" (featuring Yasmin; David Morales remix) | 6:55 |
| 16. | "Caught Up" (featuring Yasmin; Kings of Tomorrow remix) | 4:55 |
| 17. | "No Chill" | 5:09 |
| 18. | "All Gonna Be" (featuring Alex Mills; Low Steppa remix) | 6:49 |
| 19. | "Everything" (featuring Yasmin) | 6:14 |
| 20. | "Feeling U" (featuring Yasmin; Club mix) | 6:38 |
| 21. | "Caught Up" (featuring Yasmin; Sonny Fodera remix) | 5:55 |
| 22. | "Always Gonna Be" (featuring Alex Mills; Mat.Joe Funked Up remix) | 7:35 |
| Total length: | | 127:30 |

== Charts ==
Chart performance for Frequently Flying
| Chart (2016) | Peak position |
|---|---|
| UK Album Downloads (Official Charts) | 85 |
| UK Dance Albums (Official Charts) | 5 |

== Certifications ==
Certifications for Frequently Flying
| Region | Certification | Certified units/sales |
|---|---|---|
| United Kingdom (BPI) | Silver | 60,000^{‡} |
^{‡} Sales+streaming figures based on certification alone.
