= Charlotte Haining =

English musician

- Born: Charlotte Jane Haining; Leeds, England
- Genres: Drum and bass; electronic
- Occupations: Singer; songwriter
- Member of: Loud LDN
- Website: www.charlotte-haining.com

Charlotte Jane Haining is an English musician from Leeds. She featured on Shane Codd's "Always on My Mind", which charted at No. 91 on the Irish Singles Chart. She also co-wrote "Risk It All" by Ella Henderson, House Gospel Choir, and Just Kiddin, which peaked at No. 100 on the UK Singles Chart, and "My Heart Goes (La Di Da)" by Becky Hill and Topic, which peaked at No. 11 on said chart. She is a member of Loud LDN.

== Life and career ==
Charlotte Jane Haining is from Leeds but is based in London. She studied at The Liverpool Institute for Performing Arts.

On 4 May 2015, Haining featured on Ravenous' "Never Be Mine", which featured on Lee Cooper's Belgian TV advert "The Makers 2015". In 2018, she featured on Hybrid Minds' "Paint By Numbers". The single spent two weeks on the Official Physical Singles Chart at No. 58 and No. 33 in 2019 and 2020, with 66 weeks between them, and peaked at No. 29 on the Official Vinyl Singles Chart in 2020.

Also in 2018, Haining formed Majestic Minds with Haides after their joint manager put them in the same session, as part of which she used the alias Marlie. They released a single, "Oxygen", later that year. In 2020, Haining was an International Jury Member to help select Finland's 2020 Eurovision Song Contest entry. In 2020, BCee and Haining released the album Life as We Know It. They started working together after BCee, who was looking for vocalists anyway, saw her at Liquicity, prompting him to google her, come across her cover version of Major Lazer's "Lean On", and send her a track he had made as half of The Vanguard Project. The album explores a number of deep emotional issues such as mental health and bereavement, which Haining and BCee attribute to BCee's "brain dumps", or outpourings of emotion, which he would email Haining in various states of musicality for her to convert into lyrics. BCee is Steve Jefroy. The album charted at No. 69 on the UK Albums Download Chart.

In 2021, Haining featured on Shane Codd's "Always On My Mind", which charted at No. 91 on the Irish Singles Chart and No. 1 on the Billboard's Dance/Mix Show Airplay chart, and co-wrote "Risk It All" by Ella Henderson, House Gospel Choir, and Just Kiddin, which peaked at No. 100 on the UK Singles Chart, and "My Heart Goes (La Di Da)" by Becky Hill and Topic, which peaked at No. 11 on said chart. In addition, her single "Out of Time" with Ares Carter appeared on the FIFA 22 VOLTA soundtrack.

== Personal life ==
Haining is the partner of Tempza; their first date took place after he stayed at BCee's for a weekend. She is a member of Loud LDN.
