= My Loving =

Single by Sonny Fodera and Chrystal

from the album Can We Do It All Again?
- Released: 27 February 2026
- Length: 2:50
- Label: Solotoko
- Songwriters: Sonny Fodera; Chrystal; Josh Wilkinson
- Producers: Sonny Fodera; Ollie Knight

Sonny Fodera singles chronology
| "Think About Us" (2025) | "My Loving" (2026) | "Let Me Be In Your Arms" (2026) |

Chrystal singles chronology
| "Outta My Mind (Touch)" (2026) | "My Loving" (2026) | "Outta My Mind (Touch)" (2026) |

"My Loving" is a song by Australian musician Sonny Fodera and British singer and songwriter Chrystal. The song was released on 27 February 2026.

Upon release, Fodera said "I am so excited for this track to come out. From the moment I heard Chrystal's vocal, I knew this had to be the next single. Her voice and artistry is genuinely insane and it's so good to be working with her."

== Reception ==
It was The Music's "power pick" (An Australian song that has the potential to be a hit) for the week commencing 2 March 2026, with Maddy Rowe saying "'My Loving' instantly sounds like a radio smash hit. It has everything that makes a Sonny Fodera record great - big snares, big bass, big vocals and a big catchy sing along hook."

== Track listing ==
Digital download and streaming
| No. | Title | Length |
|---|---|---|
| 1. | "My Loving" | 2:50 |

Digital download and streaming
| No. | Title | Length |
|---|---|---|
| 1. | "My Loving" (extended) | 4:33 |

Digital download and streaming
| No. | Title | Length |
|---|---|---|
| 1. | "My Loving" (Morgan Seatree remix) | 2:32 |
| 2. | "My Loving" | 2:50 |

== Charts ==
=== Weekly charts ===
Weekly chart performance
| Chart (2026) | Peak position |
|---|---|
| Estonia Airplay (TopHit) | 76 |
| Latvia Airplay (LaIPA) | 5 |
| Latvia Airplay (TopHit) Morgan Seatree Remix | 83 |
| Lithuania Airplay (TopHit) | 33 |
| New Zealand Hot Singles (RMNZ) | 27 |
| UK Singles (Official Charts) | 66 |
| UK Dance (Official Charts) | 12 |
| UK Indie (Official Charts) | 22 |

=== Monthly charts ===
Monthly chart performance
| Chart (2026) | Peak position |
|---|---|
| Latvia Airplay (TopHit) | 100 |
| Latvia Airplay (TopHit) Morgan Seatree Remix | 94 |
| Lithuania Airplay (TopHit) | 40 |
