= Mind Still =

Single by Sonny Fodera featuring Blythe

from the album Can We Do It All Again?
- Released: 5 April 2024
- Length: 2:36
- Label: Soloko
- Songwriters: Sonny Fodera; Issey Cross; Jan Hammele; Andreas Josef Huber
- Producers: Sonny Fodera; Blyne

Sonny Fodera singles chronology
"Never Be Alone" (2024)	"Mind Still" (2024)	"Somedays" (2024)

"Mind Still" is a song by Australian musician Sonny Fodera featuring Blythe. The song made its live debut at Fodera's Alexandra Palace show in London on 29 March 2024. It was released on 5 April 2024 as the second single from Fodera's sixth studio album, Can We Do It All Again? (2026).

The single was certified silver in the United Kingdom and gold in Australia in 2026.

== Reception ==
Beats of Africa said "Continuing to demonstrate his unique gift for producing standout originals, new single 'Mind Still' is a hypnotic anthem featuring the spine tingling and angelic vocals of blythe. Soaring above warm synth patterns and driving house drums with lush melodies that swirl amongst the dance floor ready groove, 'Mind Still' is sure to captivate packed crowds this summer."

Aidan Grant from Ear Milk said "Fodera's knack for crafting infectious tunes is evident as 'Mind Still' seamlessly blends warm synth patterns with pulsating house beats, pulsating with a stutter house groove and emotional tone throughout the journey."

== Track listing ==
Digital download and streaming
No.	Title	Length
1.	"Mind Still"	2:36
2.	"Mind Still" (extended)	4:56

Digital download and streaming
No.	Title	Length
1.	"Mind Still" (Tita Lau remix)	2:46
2.	"Mind Still" (Tita Lau extended remix)	4:59

Digital download and streaming
No.	Title	Length
1.	"Mind Still" (Oppidan remix)	3:24
2.	"Mind Still" (Oppidan extended remix)	4:19

Digital download and streaming
No.	Title	Length
1.	"Mind Still" (1991 remix)	3:24
2.	"Mind Still"	2:36
3.	"Mind Still" (Oppidan remix)	3:24
4.	"Mind Still" (Tita Lau remix)	2:46

== Charts ==
Weekly chart performance for "Mind Still"
Chart (2024)	Peak position
Australia Club Tracks (ARIA)	40
Ireland (IRMA)	77
UK Singles (Official Charts)	68
UK Dance (Official Charts)	24
UK Indie (Official Charts)	12

== Certifications ==
Region	Certification	Certified units/sales
Australia (ARIA)	Gold	35,000^{‡}
United Kingdom (BPI)	Silver	200,000^{‡}
^{‡} Sales+streaming figures based on certification alone.
