= Rise (Sonny Fodera album) =

2019 album by Sonny Fodera

Studio album by Sonny Fodera
- Released: 12 July 2019
- Length: 43:54
- Label: Solotoko
- Producer: Sonny Fodera

Sonny Fodera chronology
Frequently Flying (2016)	Rise (2019)	Wide Awake (2021)

Singles from Rise
- 1. "Into You" Released: 5 April 2019; 2. "Back This Groove Up" Released: 24 May 2019; 3. "The Moment" Released: 7 June 2019; 4. "Scratch My Back" Released: 28 June 2019

Rise is the fourth studio album by Australian DJ and producer Sonny Fodera. The album was announced in June 2016 and released on 12 July 2019. The album was the first on his own Solotoko imprint.

Fodera said "I called the album Rise because the last year has been crazy in terms of my career, and then constantly being in the air. And keeping the concept, I wrote a lot of the music up in the sky."

The album was supported with the Rise UK Tour in October and November 2019.

== Reception ==
Katie Bain from Billboard said "The album's dozen tracks are an extension of the sleek, sexy house that's made Fodera one of the genre's buzziest names."

Sarah Kocur from EDM wrote that "The album, which highlights all genres on the house spectrum, is an expertly crafted body of work filled with maximum dance floor impact and Fodera's signature emotive brand."

Grant Gilmore from EDM Identity said "Rise is the culmination of the hard work that Sonny has put forth in the studio over the past three years. From start to finish the album is full of house tunes that have the perfect blend of infectious grooves, vocals, and a touch of bass that will keep listeners coming back for more."

Ryan Middleton from Magnetic Magazine felt that "the album is at its best when it is bringing pure, unbridled dancefloor energy and for the most part it does just that."

== Track listing ==
Rise track listing
No.	Title	Length
1.	"The Moment" (featuring Lilly Ahlberg)	3:30
2.	"Stretch My Back" (with Biscits)	3:49
3.	"Give Me a Reason" (featuring Janai)	3:48
4.	"Been a Long Time" (with Kideko and Alex Mills)	3:10
5.	"Control" (featuring Shannon Saunders)	3:48
6.	"Into You" (featuring Sinéad Harnett)	3:34
7.	"Push Them Away" (featuring Janai)	3:59
8.	"What Is Love"	3:24
9.	"I Got You Girl" (featuring Josh Barry)	3:48
10.	"Back This Groove Up"	3:57
11.	"Creeper" (featuring Scrufizzer)	3:33
12.	"Feels So Good" (featuring ShezAr)	3:34
Total length:		43:54

== Charts ==
Chart performance for Rise
Chart (2019)	Peak position
UK Album Downloads (OCC)	58
