= Blessings (Calvin Harris song) =

Single by Calvin Harris featuring Clementine Douglas
- Released: 9 May 2025
- Genre: House; dance
- Length: 3:39
- Label: Columbia; Sony UK
- Songwriters: Adam Wiles; Clementine Douglas
- Producer: Calvin Harris

Calvin Harris singles chronology
"Smoke the Pain Away" (2025)	"Blessings" (2025)	"Ocean" (2025)

Clementine Douglas singles chronology
"Tell Me" (2025)	"Blessings" (2025)

Visualiser
- "Blessings" on YouTube

"Blessings" is a song by Scottish musician Calvin Harris featuring English singer Clementine Douglas. It was released as a single on 9 May 2025 via Columbia Records and Sony Music UK, and marked the first collaboration between Harris and Douglas who share both songwriting and production credits for the song. It was highly praised by music critics, and achieved commercial success, particularly in the United Kingdom, Belgium, Argentina, Bulgaria, Chile, Colombia, Croatia, Dominican Republic, Estonia, Guatemala, Honduras, Ireland, Kazakhstan, Latvia and Russia where it reached the top ten of their respective national singles charts.

== Background and production ==
Harris collaborates with British singer Clementine Douglas on the song, with both Harris and Douglas sharing songwriting and production credits. Harris was highly appreciative of Douglas' contribution to the song, saying that Douglas "gets the soul across, she gets the sound and she knows exactly what sound is". He further added that "she just gets it, and it's something pretty magical". The song marks a return to dance music from Harris, after his previous single, 2025's "Smoke the Pain Away" incorporated country music elements throughout, which was deemed a new market for Harris. His decision to work with Douglas on the song was considered as a serious commitment of his to working with new talent who were deemed to be rising stars in the music industry.

The extent of Harris's career has been attributed to shaping the "sonic landscape" of the song, however, it was noted that Douglas's involvement "speaks volumes" about her own creative input. During the songwriting and production sessions for the song, both Harris and Douglas shared a number of ideas which were eventually subsumed into the final version.

Ahead of its release, "Blessings" was quickly dubbed "sound of the summer" by Audio Jacked magazine, who described the song as a "proper ray of sunshine". The song received its debut airplay on BBC Radio 1 on Danny Howard's Dance Party.

== Composition ==
"Blessings" is composed in a manner which produces 130 beats per minute in the key of B minor. It was credited as a return to Harris's "feel good summer songs" in which Audio Jacked magazine claimed Harris had "nailed over the years". The song incorporates synth work, piano chords, and "euphoric energy", which has been attributed to creating a "uplifting and summery vibe". Additionally, "Blessings" took inspiration from both dance and house music from the 1990s, with particular attention been drawn to similarities between the song and "Offshore", a single released by British DJ and producer Chicane in 1996.

Harris considered the musical composition of the song, with a particular emphasis on marketing the song for during the summer period. His decision was said to be a "strategic move to maximise the track's appeal" during the summer months. It marked a move from his brief venture into country music, and has been suggested that returning to his dance and house music roots came after a realisation that this is what his fan base preferred, rather than country music.

== Copyright infringement accusation ==
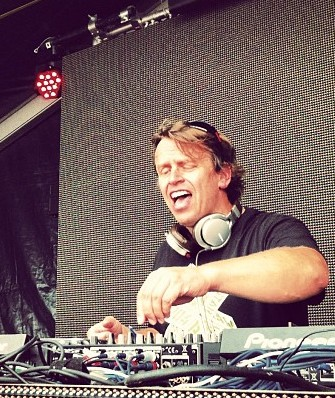
British DJ Chicane accused Harris of copyright over similarities to his 1996 single "Offshore"

Shortly after its release, Harris and British DJ Chicane became embroiled in a dispute over what Chicane suggested were similarities between "Blessings" and his 1996 single "Offshore". Chicane accused Harris of copyright infringement, and posted a video to his social media accounts of him breaking down both "Offshore" and "Blessings" to highlight the similarities. Chicane claimed that he "never thought he would have to make a video about copyright and plagiarism". EDM Identity suggested that similarities between both songs were evident, particularly following Chicane introducing a loop in on top of "Blessings", which was said to show "an almost indiscernible difference between the two melodies". In response, Chicane said that "I think you'll probably agree it's really hard to decipher when one comes in and one goes", before he commented that "it is because they're almost identical, which is a bit of a problem". He later stated that all he was intending to do by highlighting the similarities was to "defend my copyright and my intellectual property here".

Harris quickly disputed Chicane's claims of copyright infringement, and in response, posted a video to his own social media channels to highlight the "lack" of similarities between "Blessings" and "Offshore". Harris accused Chicane of committing copyright infringement himself on "Offshore" by bringing in both "Offshore" and "Love on a Real Train" by Tangerine Dream to highlight the clear similarities between the two songs, with Harris suggesting both are "the exact same". Harris insisted all he was doing was playing "two notes over multiple different chords", and highlighted that this is common practice in music production, but argued that did not make both his and Chicane's songs the same.

== Critical reception ==
Reviews from music critics were largely positive, many of whom praised the songs "summer vibe" and Harris's collaboration with Douglas. Billboard ranked the song as one of the best new dance releases of the week, and said that the song "balances lightness and urgency, with the production built around a stabby synth and layered up with Clementine's bittersweet lyrics".

== Commercial performance ==
Shortly following its official release, the Official Charts Company revealed that "Blessings" was on track to become the highest charting entry in the United Kingdom in the week following its release. After only forty-eight hours of release, it was scheduled to debut on the UK Singles Chart at number eight, which would make it Harris's thirty-first UK top 10 single, whilst it would mark Douglas's second UK top 10 single. On 16 May 2025, "Blessings" debuted at number eight on the official singles chart in the United Kingdom, and in addition, debuted at number one on both the UK Singles Downloads and Singles Sales charts, at number two on the UK Dance Singles Chart and number twenty on the UK Streaming Chart.

In the Republic of Ireland, "Blessings" debuted at number nine on the Irish Singles Chart, making it the highest new entry on the Irish charts for that week. Additionally, it debuted at number forty-nine on the Ultratop 50 Singles (Flemish chart) in Belgium and number seventy-six in both Switzerland and the Netherlands.

== Charts ==
=== Weekly charts ===
Weekly chart performance for "Blessings"
Chart (2025–2026)	Peak position
Australia (ARIA)	44
Australia Airplay (RCS)	17
Australia Dance (ARIA)	2
Austria (Ö3 Austria Top 40)	50
Belarus Airplay (TopHit)	7
Belgium (Ultratop 50 Flanders)	3
Belgium (Ultratop 50 Wallonia)	9
Bolivia Anglo Airplay (Monitor Latino)	7
Bulgaria Airplay (PROPHON)	1
Canada Hot 100 (Billboard)	70
Canada CHR/Top 40 (Billboard)	37
Central America Anglo Airplay (Monitor Latino)	5
Chile Anglo Airplay (Monitor Latino)	6
Colombia Anglo Airplay (National-Report)	2
CIS Airplay (TopHit)	2
Croatia International Airplay (Top lista)	2
Dominican Republic Anglo Airplay (Monitor Latino)	4
Ecuador Anglo Airplay (Monitor Latino)	9
Estonia Airplay (TopHit)	1
Finland Airplay (Radiosoittolista)	29
France (SNEP)	110
Germany (GfK)	24
Germany Dance (GfK)	2
Global 200 (Billboard)	73
Greece International (IFPI)	17
Guatemala Anglo Airplay (Monitor Latino)	3
Honduras Anglo Airplay (Monitor Latino)	1
Hungary (Dance Top 40)	1
Hungary (Editors' Choice Top 40)	7
Ireland (IRMA)	5
Italy Airplay (EarOne)	61
Kazakhstan Airplay (TopHit)	7
Latin America Anglo Airplay (Monitor Latino)	12
Latvia Airplay (LaIPA)	1
Lithuania (AGATA)	46
Lithuania Airplay (TopHit)	3
Luxembourg (Billboard)	13
Malta Airplay (Radiomonitor)	3
Mexico Anglo Airplay (Monitor Latino)	5
Moldova Airplay (TopHit)	28
Netherlands (Dutch Top 40)	1
Netherlands (Single Top 100)	8
New Zealand Hot Singles (RMNZ)	7
Nicaragua Anglo Airplay (Monitor Latino)	5
North Macedonia Airplay (Radiomonitor)	1
Norway (VG-lista)	54
Peru Anglo Airplay (Monitor Latino)	6
Poland Airplay (OLiS)	3
Poland Streaming (OLiS)	21
Portugal (AFP)	64
Romania Airplay (TopHit)	95
Russia Airplay (TopHit)	3
Serbia Airplay (Radiomonitor)	5
Slovakia Airplay (ČNS IFPI)	14
Slovakia Singles Digital (ČNS IFPI)	26
Suriname (Nationale Top 40)	4
Sweden (Sverigetopplistan)	75
Switzerland (Schweizer Hitparade)	16
Ukraine Airplay (TopHit)	20
UK Singles (Official Charts)	3
UK Dance (Official Charts)	1
Uruguay Anglo Airplay (Monitor Latino)	9
US Hot Dance/Electronic Songs (Billboard)	3
Venezuela Anglo Airplay (Monitor Latino)	1

=== Monthly charts ===
Monthly chart performance for "Blessings"
Chart (2025)	Peak position
Belarus Airplay (TopHit)	9
CIS Airplay (TopHit)	2
Estonia Airplay (TopHit)	1
Kazakhstan Airplay (TopHit)	13
Latvia Airplay (TopHit)	1
Lithuania Airplay (TopHit)	8
Moldova Airplay (TopHit)	64
Russia Airplay (TopHit)	4
Ukraine Airplay (TopHit)	26

=== Year-end charts ===
Year-end chart performance for "Blessings"
Chart (2025)	Position
Belarus Airplay (TopHit)	79
Belgium (Ultratop 50 Flanders)	12
Belgium (Ultratop 50 Wallonia)	64
Bulgaria Airplay (PROPHON)	10
CIS Airplay (TopHit)	16
Estonia Airplay (TopHit)	8
Germany (GfK)	85
Hungary (Dance Top 40)	12
Kazakhstan Airplay (TopHit)	34
Latvia Airplay (TopHit)	1
Lithuania Airplay (TopHit)	18
Netherlands (Dutch Top 40)	3
Netherlands (Single Top 100)	32
Poland (Polish Airplay Top 100)	50
Russia Airplay (TopHit)	19
Switzerland (Schweizer Hitparade)	85
UK Singles (OCC)	41
US Hot Dance/Electronic Songs (Billboard)	7

== Certifications ==
Certifications for "Blessings"
Region	Certification	Certified units/sales
Australia (ARIA)	Platinum	70,000^{‡}
Belgium (BRMA)	Platinum	40,000^{‡}
France (SNEP)	Gold	100,000^{‡}
Hungary (MAHASZ)	2× Platinum	8,000^{‡}
Mexico (AMPROFON)	Gold	70,000^{‡}
New Zealand (RMNZ)	Platinum	30,000^{‡}
Poland (ZPAV)	Platinum	125,000^{‡}
Spain (Promusicae)	Gold	50,000^{‡}
Switzerland (IFPI Switzerland)	Gold	15,000^{‡}
United Kingdom (BPI)	Platinum	600,000^{‡}
Streaming
Greece (IFPI Greece)	Gold	1,000,000^{†}
^{‡} Sales+streaming figures based on certification alone.^{†} Streaming-only figures based on certification alone.

== Release history ==
Release dates and formats for "Blessings"
Region	Date	Format	Label	Ref.
Various	9 May 2025	Digital download; streaming	Columbia; Sony UK	
Italy	16 May 2025	Radio airplay	Sony Italy	
