= Think About Us (Sonny Fodera song) =

Single by Sonny Fodera, D.O.D. and Poppy Baskcomb

from the album Can We Do It All Again?
- Released: 17 October 2025
- Length: 2:58
- Label: Solotoko
- Songwriters: Sonny Fodera; Poppy Baskcomb; Stuart Crichton; William Lansley; John Morgan
- Producers: Sonny Fodera; D.O.D.; Stuart Crichton; Punctual

Sonny Fodera singles chronology
| "All This Time" (2025) | "Think About Us" (2025) | "My Loving" (2026) |

D.O.D. singles chronology
| "Sweet Nothing [2025]" (2025) | "Think About Us" (2025) |

Poppy Baskcomb singles chronology
| "Rain" (2025) | "Think About Us" (2025) | "Red in the Desert" (2025) |

Music video
- "Think About Us" on YouTube

"Think About Us" is a song by Australian musician Sonny Fodera, British DJ and record producer D.O.D. and singer Poppy Baskcomb. The song was released on 17 October 2025.

At the 2026 ARIA Music Awards, it was nominated for Song of the Year.

== Track listing ==
Digital download and streaming
| No. | Title | Length |
|---|---|---|
| 1. | "Think About Us" | 3:27 |

Digital download and streaming
| No. | Title | Length |
|---|---|---|
| 1. | "Think About Us" (extended) | 4:45 |

Digital download and streaming
| No. | Title | Length |
|---|---|---|
| 1. | "Think About Us" (K Motionz remix) | 2:45 |

Digital download and streaming
| No. | Title | Length |
|---|---|---|
| 1. | "Think About Us" (Franky Wah remix) | 2:56 |

Digital download and streaming
| No. | Title | Length |
|---|---|---|
| 1. | "Think About Us" (Hitty remix) | 3:15 |

Digital download and streaming
| No. | Title | Length |
|---|---|---|
| 1. | "Think About Us" (Lucas Estrada remix) | 2:45 |

Digital download and streaming
| No. | Title | Length |
|---|---|---|
| 1. | "Think About Us" (VIP mix) | 2:42 |

Digital download and streaming
| No. | Title | Length |
|---|---|---|
| 1. | "Think About Us" (Cyril remix) | 2:58 |

== Charts ==
=== Weekly charts ===
Weekly chart performance
| Chart (2025–2026) | Peak position |
|---|---|
| Australia (ARIA) | 48 |
| Australia Airplay (RCS) | 1 |
| Australia Dance (ARIA) | 4 |
| Austria Airplay (MusicTrace) | 45 |
| Belarus Airplay (TopHit) | 4 |
| CIS Airplay (TopHit) | 8 |
| Croatia International Airplay (Top lista) | 30 |
| Estonia Airplay (TopHit) | 2 |
| Finland Airplay (Radiosoittolista) | 91 |
| Germany Airplay (MusicTrace) | 21 |
| Germany Dance (GfK) | 16 |
| Global Dance Radio (Billboard/WARM) | 3 |
| Ireland (IRMA) | 24 |
| Kazakhstan Airplay (TopHit) | 13 |
| Latvia Airplay (LaIPA) | 9 |
| Lithuania Airplay (TopHit) | 22 |
| Lithuania Airplay (TopHit) Lucas Estrada remix | 63 |
| Malta Airplay (Radiomonitor) | 8 |
| Moldova Airplay (TopHit) | 5 |
| New Zealand Hot Singles (RMNZ) | 1 |
| Poland Airplay (OLiS) | 25 |
| Russia Airplay (TopHit) | 6 |
| UK Singles (Official Charts) | 18 |
| UK Dance (Official Charts) | 3 |
| UK Independent (Official Charts) | 4 |
| US Hot Dance/Electronic Songs (Billboard) | 20 |

=== Monthly charts ===
Monthly chart performance
| Chart (2025–2026) | Peak position |
|---|---|
| Belarus Airplay (TopHit) | 5 |
| CIS Airplay (TopHit) | 10 |
| Estonia Airplay (TopHit) | 3 |
| Kazakhstan Airplay (TopHit) | 26 |
| Latvia Airplay (TopHit) | 13 |
| Lithuania Airplay (TopHit) | 25 |
| Moldova Airplay (TopHit) | 7 |
| Russia Airplay (TopHit) | 11 |

== Certifications ==
Certifications for "Think About Us"
| Region | Certification | Certified units/sales |
|---|---|---|
| Australia (ARIA) | Gold | 35,000^{‡} |
| New Zealand (RMNZ) | Gold | 15,000^{‡} |
| United Kingdom (BPI) | Gold | 400,000^{‡} |
^{‡} Sales+streaming figures based on certification alone.
