= House Gospel Choir =

London-based choir

- Choir
- Origin: London
- Founder: Natalie Maddix
- Genre: Fusion of house and gospel music
- Website: housegospelchoir.com

House Gospel Choir (HGC) is a London-based vocal group which debuted in 2014 at Glastonbury Festival. Founded by creative director Natalie Maddix, the choir combines two distinct musical genres – house music and gospel. HGC's debut album RE//CHOIRED (2020) includes reimagined house classics and dance anthems, as well as original tracks.

The choir has featured on Ella Henderson and Just Kiddin's "Risk It All" and also performed with Kylie Minogue for her virtual concert Infinite Disco. More recently, the choir featured on multiple songs of Harry Styles's 2026 album Kiss All the Time. Disco, Occasionally

As of February 2020, HGC had 150 members of diverse religious backgrounds.

== Background ==
Based in London, House Gospel Choir was founded by vocalist Natalie Maddix, who had been working in music programming and management. Maddix grew up singing gospel at her Pentecostal Church in Vauxhall and Latin hymns at her Catholic secondary school in Camberwell, and developed interest in garage when she was sixteen. She was inspired to pursue house music while at Pretoria House 22 in Johannesburg, when she was in South Africa with producer Atjazz to promote "Selfish Skies". She went on to be featured in "Eye Know" by Scratcha DVA from his 2012 album "Pretty Ugly".

In 2014, Maddix published an Instagram post inviting people to join a house choir. The first twelve members formed House Gospel Choir in a rehearsal space in Hackney.

Prior to their first rehearsal session, Maddix booked their first gig on the acoustic stage at Glastonbury. She secured the opportunity while programming choirs for Olympic Park, when one of the directors she was working with mentioned that a booker was looking for a choir. By the time of the gig, the choir had thirty members, including DJs, keyboardists, and vocalists.

== Performances ==
At Glastonbury Festival in 2014, House Gospel Choir performed a set with songs such as "Beautiful People" by Barbara Tucker and "Up Above My Head" by Kirk Franklin.

House Gospel Choir and Adelphi Music Factory performed their "Salvation" at Homobloc Festival 2019 in Manchester. Mixmag called it an "utterly storming piano houser" that "really summed up the warmth of the whole Homobloc experience." In 2020, House Gospel Choir performed at the online-only Notting Hill Carnival.

In 2022, the House Gospel Choir featured in a live tour with entrepreneur Steven Bartlett in the stage adaptation of his podcast, The Diary of a CEO. The HGC accompanied Bartlett throughout the show, punctuating his autobiographical anecdotes with songs such as "Oh Happy Day" and Gnarls Barkley's "Crazy". Reviewer Marianka Swain of The Daily Telegraph described the show as "the most bonkers night I have ever spent at the theatre".

Later that year, the choir performed with musician John Cale at the Wales Millennium Centre in commemoration of his 80th birthday, and on the BBC One New Year's Eve special.

== Releases ==
=== Singles ===
In 2017, House Gospel Choir and MNEK featured on "Deeper" by Riton, and in 2018, they released a cover version of "Battle" by Wookie, produced by Wookie himself. In 2019, HGC released "Salvation" with Adelphi Music Factory, which stayed on the Billboard Dance Club Chart for 12 weeks, peaking at No. 5. On 24 April 2020, they released the Toddla T-produced "Blind Faith", which was written in 2018, and whose video consisted of a virtual choir.

On 7 November 2020, HGC featured on Kylie Minogue's Infinite Disco livestream, on the songs "All the Lovers" and "Say Something". A review in Retropop Magazine praised "Say Something" for its "stellar guest vocals from the House Gospel Choir".

In 2021, HGC featured on Blinkie's "Stronger", and later that year they and Just Kiddin featured on Ella Henderson's "Risk It All", which charted at No. 100 on the UK Singles Chart.

=== Album ===
On 23 October 2020, House Gospel Choir released their debut album, RE//CHOIRED. Mixmag called the album "a spirited and feel-good celebration of house music and soundsystem culture...a testament to the power and healing potential of collectivity in music." Along with HGC, RE//CHOIRED features house DJs and musical artists such as Todd Terry, Alex Metric, DJ Spen, Todd Terry, Toddla T, and Wookie, gospel musician Nicky Brown, and multi-instrumantalist Troy Miller.

RE//CHOIRED charted at No. 69 on the UK Album Downloads Chart and No. 4 on the Official Christian & Gospel Albums Chart.
