= Disconnect (Becky Hill and Chase & Status song) =

Single by Becky Hill and Chase & Status

from the album Believe Me Now?
- Released: 14 July 2023
- Genre: Drum and bass
- Length: 2:44
- Label: Polydor
- Songwriters: Rebecca Claire Hill; Saul Milton; William Kennard; Karen Poole; Emily Makis; Kieron McIntosh
- Producers: Chase & Status; McIntosh

Becky Hill singles chronology
"Side Effects" (2023)	"Disconnect" (2023)	"Never Be Alone" (2024)

Chase & Status singles chronology
"Mixed Emotions" (2022)	"Disconnect" (2023)	"Baddadan" (2023)

Music video
- "Disconnect" on YouTube

"Disconnect" is a song by British singer Becky Hill and electronic music duo Chase & Status. It was released on 14 July 2023 through Polydor as the second single from her second studio album, Believe Me Now?.

The song peaked at number six on the UK Singles Chart, becoming Hill's sixth and Chase & Status' fifth top-ten single respectively. It is also the latter's first since "Count On Me" in 2013.

== Background and composition ==
Ahead of its release, the artists already performed the track at several festivals. Hill explained that she had never been more excited to release "a drum 'n' bass tune" than she was about "Disconnect". The singer referred to the song as "a true dance floor record that tows the line between the rave and the radio". She further revealed that she had been dreaming of working with Chase & Status ever since she was a teenager.

== Charts ==
=== Weekly charts ===
Weekly chart performance for "Disconnect"
Chart (2023–2024)	Peak position
Czech Republic Airplay (ČNS IFPI)	81
Ireland (IRMA)	26
New Zealand (Recorded Music NZ)	29
Nigeria (TurnTable Top 100)	47
UK Singles (Official Charts)	6
UK Dance (Official Charts)	2
US Hot Dance/Electronic Songs (Billboard)	34

=== Year-end charts ===
2023 year-end chart performance for "Disconnect"
Chart (2023)	Position
UK Singles (OCC)	66

2024 year-end chart performance for "Disconnect"
Chart (2024)	Position
UK Singles (OCC)	83

== Certifications ==
Certifications for "Disconnect"
Region	Certification	Certified units/sales
New Zealand (RMNZ)	Platinum	30,000^{‡}
United Kingdom (BPI)	2× Platinum	1,200,000^{‡}
^{‡} Sales+streaming figures based on certification alone.
