= Risk It All (Ella Henderson, House Gospel Choir and Just Kiddin song) =

Single by Ella Henderson, House Gospel Choir and Just Kiddin
- Released: 20 August 2021
- Studio: The Pool (London, UK)
- Genre: Dance; pop
- Length: 2:58
- Label: Major Tom's; Asylum; Warner
- Songwriters: Ella Henderson; Charlotte Haining; Lewis Thomson; Rob Harvey
- Producer: Just Kiddin

Ella Henderson singles chronology
"Let's Go Home Together" (2021)	"Risk It All" (2021)	"Hurricane" (2021)

Music video
- "Risk It All" music video on YouTube

Music video
- "Risk It All" (acoustic) music video on YouTube

"Risk It All" is a standalone single by English singer-songwriter Ella Henderson, the House Gospel Choir and producer Just Kiddin, released on 20 August 2021 through Major Tom's / Asylum Records and Warner Music Group. Described by critics as an uplifting euphoric dance and pop song, it features lyrics that speak of facing your fears in life and love, and giving a relationship a second chance.

The song was promoted with live performances on BBC Radio 2's Breakfast Show with Zoe Ball and the homecoming ceremony for Team GB's Paralympics Team Homecoming. Upon its release, "Risk It All" debuted and peaked at 100 on the UK Singles Chart.

== Background and composition ==
In 2015, a year after topping the UK Albums Chart with her debut album Chapter One, Ella Henderson began working on her second album. Despite completing album number two, Henderson suffered from severe anxiety which ultimately led to delays and her departure from Syco Music, for a new deal with Rudimental's label Major Tom's and Asylum Records. It was Rudimental that introduced Henderson to the London-based vocal group House Gospel Choir.

Speaking about how "Risk It All" came about, Henderson said "When the Rudimental boys introduced me to House Gospel Choir, I knew I had to work with them. It was such an amazing experience collaborating with them and Just Kiddin on this song. I hope it uplifts you as much as it did us in the studio." "Risk It All" is a dance music and pop song with a "vibrant production" that invokes "euphoria" and lyrics that speak of giving a relationship a second chance. Henderson spoke about the song on her social media accounts, saying "it's alllllll about taking risks and not being afraid to face your fears in love and in life" [sic].

== Reception ==
Upon release, "Risk It All" received support from music streaming platforms and radio stations in the UK. It was playlisted by BBC Radio 1 and BBC Radio 2, as well as being picked as one "Hottest Record In The World Right Now" on Charlie Hedges's Dance Anthems show. Additionally, it was included on Spotify's 'New Music Friday' and 'All New All Now' playlists, as well as Apple Music's 'New Music Daily' playlist. "Risk It All" received a positive review from music critic Jon Stickler, from Stereoboard, who that said that Henderson's vocals combined with the choir's to "lift the vibe".

== Promotion ==
On the day of release, 20 August 2021, Henderson appeared on Zoe Ball's Breakfast Show on BBC Radio 2 for a live acoustic performance of the song. The single's cover art was shot by photographer Matt Pearson and was accompanied by other photos, all taken during the music video shoot atop Seven Sisters Cliffs in Sussex, England. Henderson would later appear on 12 September with the House Gospel Choir at the Team GB Paralympics Homecoming Ceremony for a performance of "Risk It All", live on Channel 4.

== Music videos ==
The music video for "Risk It All" features Henderson and the House Gospel Choir atop the Seven Sisters cliffs in Sussex, England. The theme of the video is around a "Last Day on Earth", with a couple departing for the cliffs and mark off activities from their bucket list as "an asteroid threatens the Earth". It features scenes of both "pre-Apocalyptic drama" and "young love and a gratitude for being alive", and "touches the dichotomy of love and fear". The video made its debut on 27 August 2021, and was directed by Lewis Cater. According to Promonews's Rob Ulitski, the video is "brilliantly realised... with a surprising feel-good factor".

A music video performance of the acoustic version of "Risk It All" was released on 10 September 2021. It was recorded at The Pool Studios in Bermondsey, London.

== Track listing ==
Digital single

1. "Risk It All" (Ella Henderson, The House Gospel Choir, Just Kiddin) – 2:58

Acoustic single

1. "Risk It All" (Ella Henderson & The House Gospel Choir) – 3:18
2. "Risk It All" (Ella Henderson, The House Gospel Choir, Just Kiddin) – 2:58

Just Kidding VIP mix single

1. "Risk It All" (Just Kidding VIP mix) – 4:27
2. "Risk It All" (Club Mix) – 3:24
3. "Risk It All" (Ella Henderson, The House Gospel Choir, Just Kiddin) – 2:58

KC Lights remix single

1. "Risk It All" (KC Lights remix) – 3:21
2. "Risk It All" (Ella Henderson, The House Gospel Choir, Just Kiddin) – 2:58

== Personnel and credits ==
Recording locations

- The Pool (London, UK)

Personnel

- Ella Henderson – vocals
- House Gospel Choir – vocals
- Henri Davies – vocal recording engineer
- Sarah Dorgan – assistant engineer (acoustic version)
- David Emery – mixing and mastering engineer (acoustic version)
- Kevin Grainger – mixing engineer, mastering engineer
- Charlotte Haining – background vocals
- Billy Halliday – engineer (acoustic version)
- Lizzie Jennings – choir arranger
- Ben Loveland – assistant engineer
- Natalie Maddix – choir director
- Robert Sellens – engineer
- Lewis Thomson (Just Kiddin) – producer, background vocals

== Charts ==
Weekly chart performance for "Risk It All"
Chart (2021)	Peak position
UK Singles (OCC)	100

== Release history ==
Release history for "Risk It All"
Region	Date	Format	Version	Label	Ref.
Various	20 August 2021	Digital download; streaming	Original version	Major Tom's; Asylum; Warner	
Various	10 September 2021	Digital download; streaming	Acoustic version	Major Tom's; Asylum; Warner	
Various	24 September 2021	Digital download; streaming	Just Kidding VIP mix	Major Tom's; Asylum; Warner	
Various	8 October 2021	Digital download; streaming	KC Lights remix	Major Tom's; Asylum; Warner	
