= Tell Me (Sonny Fodera and Clementine Douglas song) =

Single by Sonny Fodera and Clementine Douglas

from the album Can We Do It All Again?
- Released: 7 February 2025
- Length: 3:17
- Label: Solotoko
- Songwriters: Sonny Fodera; Clementine Douglas; Ruth-Anne Cunningham; Stuart Crichton
- Producers: Sonny Fodera; Clementine Douglas; Stuart Chricton

Sonny Fodera singles chronology
"Somedays" (2024)	"Tell Me" (2025)	"All This Time" (2025)

Clementine Douglas singles chronology
"True" (2025)	"Tell Me" (2025)	"Blessings" (2025)

Music video
- "Tell Me" on YouTube

"Tell Me" is a song by Australian musician Sonny Fodera and British singer and songwriter Clementine Douglas. The song was released on 7 February 2025.

At the APRA Music Awards of 2026, the song was nominated for Most Performed Australian Work and won Most Performed Dance/Electronic Work.

== Reception ==
Jack Shephard from New Wave Mag called it a "Hypnotising Collab", adding "A rapid drum pattern, pulsating production backdrop and layered vocals on the chorus give Clementine's voice an almost choral effect, intensifying the words she is singing."

== Track listing ==
Digital download and streaming
No.	Title	Length
1.	"Tell Me"	3:17

Digital download and streaming
No.	Title	Length
1.	"Tell Me" (Morgan Seatree remix)	2:46

Digital download and streaming
No.	Title	Length
1.	"Tell Me" (extended)	5:14

Digital download and streaming
No.	Title	Length
1.	"Tell Me" (Agent of Time remix)	4:04

Digital download and streaming
No.	Title	Length
1.	"Tell Me" (Chill mix)	3:13

== Charts ==
=== Weekly charts ===
Weekly chart performance for "Tell Me"
Chart (2025)	Peak position
Australia Club Tracks (ARIA)	15
Belarus Airplay (TopHit)	172
Ireland (IRMA)	50
Latvia Airplay (LaIPA)	16
Latvia Airplay (TopHit)	2
Lithuania Airplay (TopHit)	99
Poland (Polish Airplay Top 100)	25
Ukraine Airplay (TopHit)	73
UK Singles (OCC)	23
UK Dance (OCC)	3
UK Indie (OCC)	4

=== Monthly charts ===
Monthly chart performance for "Tell Me"
Chart (2025)	Peak position
Latvia Airplay (TopHit)	6
Ukraine Airplay (TopHit)	72

=== Year-end charts ===
Year-end chart performance
Chart (2025)	Position
Latvia Airplay (TopHit)	79

== Certifications ==
Certifications for "Tell Me"
Region	Certification	Certified units/sales
United Kingdom (BPI)	Gold	400,000^{‡}
^{‡} Sales+streaming figures based on certification alone.
