= Turn Back Time (Diplo and Sonny Fodera song) =

2021 single by Diplo and Sonny Fodera

Single by Diplo and Sonny Fodera

from the album Wide Awake and the EP Do You Dance?
- Released: November 20, 2020
- Genre: UK house
- Length: 2:27
- Label: Higher Ground
- Songwriters: Henry Agincourt Allen; Sasha Alex Sloan; Sonny Fodera; Thomas Wesley Pentz
- Producers: Diplo; Sonny Fodera

Diplo singles chronology
"Daylight" (2020)	"Turn Back Time" (2020)	"Never Gonna Forget" (2021)

Music video
- "Turn Back Time" on YouTube

"Turn Back Time" is a song by American DJ and record producer Diplo and Australian producer Sonny Fodera. It was released on November 20, 2020, via Higher Ground Records. Diplo and Sonny wrote the song with King Henry and Sasha Sloan, the latter providing uncredited vocals, and co-produced it.

== Background ==
In a press release, Fodera explained: "'Turn Back Time' was born out of a late night session with me & Diplo. I was on tour in LA at the time, playing some amazing shows, meeting some really cool people and feeling super inspired by my surroundings. I played Turn Back Time in some of my last live shows and the response was so crazy, we knew we had to release it!"

== Composition ==
Nina Chiang of EDMTunes explained that the track includes "old-school piano riffs, plus a sexy deep bassline", and described it is "a catchy, deep house track." The song is written in the key of B♭ Minor, with a tempo of 124 beats per minute.

== Music video ==
The music video was released on February 11, 2021. According to the description by Rugby Scruggs of Dancing Astronaut, the video follows "an office employee who can't seem to escape a mysterious woman."

== Credits and personnel ==
Credits adapted from AllMusic.

- Henry Allen – composer
- Diplo – composer, primary Artist, producer, programmer
- Sonny Fodera – composer, primary Artist, producer, programmer
- Cass Irvine – mastering
- Noizu – producer, remix engineer
- Sasha Sloan – composer, vocalist

== Charts ==
=== Weekly charts ===
Weekly chart performance for "Turn Back Time"
Chart (2020–2021)	Peak position
Hungary (Dance Top 40)	15
US Hot Dance/Electronic Songs (Billboard)	17

=== Year-end charts ===
Year-end chart performance for "Turn Back Time"
Chart (2021)	Position
Hungary (Dance Top 40)	84
US Hot Dance/Electronic Songs (Billboard)	59

== Certifications ==
Certifications for "Turn Back Time"
Region	Certification	Certified units/sales
New Zealand (RMNZ)	Gold	15,000^{‡}
United Kingdom (BPI)	Silver	200,000^{‡}
^{‡} Sales+streaming figures based on certification alone.
