= Always Gonna Be =

Single by Sonny Fodera featuring Alex Mills

from the album Frequently Flying
- Released: 2 June 2017
- Length: 4:03 (album version)
- Label: Defected Records
- Songwriters: Sonny Fodera, Alex Mills
- Producer: Sonny Fodera

Sonny Fodera singles chronology
"Caught Up" (2017)	"Always Gonna Be" (2017)	"Moving Up" (2018)

"Always Gonna Be" is a song by Australian musician Sonny Fodera featuring Alex Mills. The song was officially released as a single on 2 June 2017 as the third and final single from Fodera's third studio album, Frequently Flying (2016) alongside remixes.

The music video premiered on 3 June 2017.

The single was certified Silver in the United Kingdom in 2023.

== Track listing ==
Digital download and streaming
No.	Title	Length
1.	"Always Gonna Be" (album version)	4:03

Digital download and streaming
No.	Title	Length
1.	"Always Gonna Be" (extended mix)	6:06
2.	"Always Gonna Be" (Low Steppa remix)	6:48
3.	"Always Gonna Be" (Mat Joe Funked Up remix)	7:35

== Certifications ==
Region	Certification	Certified units/sales
United Kingdom (BPI)	Silver	200,000^{‡}
^{‡} Sales+streaming figures based on certification alone.
