= Mesadorm =

English band

- Years active: 2003-present
- Members: Blythe Pepino; Aaron Zahl; Daisy Palmer; David Johnston; Jo Silverston

Mesadorm (formerly BiZali and Chairfight) are a band from England. Formed in 2003, the members are vocalist and keyboardist Blythe Pepino, guitarist and producer Aaron Zahl, drummer Daisy Palmer, bassist David Johnston, and cellist Jo Silverston.

Pepino met Zahl after being asked to sing at his brother's wedding and formed a duo with him in autumn 2003; seven months later, the pair performed on ITV Central's Music (Uncovered), where they reached its final. Across the series, they performed "Last Man Standing", a track about the Hutton Inquiry,and "Lucky", a track about fortune. By November 2006, the pair had enrolled at the University of Bristol, from which they had sourced two further members; that month, the quartet represented the UK at the finals of Global Battle of the Bands. Palmer and Johnston joined by May 2007.

The band released the album Dance Yourself Alone by November 2009; Joe Inglis of Sound on Sound wrote that "their sound clearly owe[d] a lot to dance music," though felt that the album was so emotional that he did not expect listeners to dance to it. The band then dissolved and moved to London; Zahl, Palmer, and Johnston played together shortly afterwards as Chairfight and then again as that in May 2017.

Zahl, Palmer, and Johnson subsequently reunited with Pepino and hired Silverston. As Mesadorm, they released the single "Tell Me" in November 2017, by which time Pepino had become known as a third of Vaults. They subsequently released "Yours and Not Yours" in February 2018. By May, they had released the single "Easy"; that month, they released the single "One Of My Friends". They also released the album Heterogaster that year, which they recorded over the course of two years at their guitarist's house, post-produced for over another year, and then named after Epicadus heterogaster, a species of spider.

Mesadorm released the single "The Joy It Joins Us Up" in January 2019, followed by "When She's In That Mood" that March. The month after, they released the album Epicadus, an acoustic album comprising ten tracks, eight of which had previously appeared on Heterogaster. The album was recorded over two days at St Peter's Church, Eype and received a mixed review from Kirstyn Smith of The Skinny.

== Discography ==
Albums

- Thanks Anna (Bizali, 2009)
- Dance Yourself Alone (Bizali, 2009)
- Heterogaster (Mesadorm, 2018)
- Epicadus (Mesadorm, 2019)
- Pollinator (Mesadorm, 2022)

Singles

The below are all credited to Mesadorm.

- "Tell Me" (2017)
- "Yours and Not Yours" (2018)
- "Easy" (2018)
- "One Of My Friends" (2018)
- "The Joy It Joins Us Up" (2019)
- "When She's In That Mood" (2019)
- "Let's Leap" (2020)
- "Take Me to a Place" (2020)
- "Numb" (2021)
- "Soap Opera" (2022)
- "Rock So Soft" (2022)

Remixes

- "Pendulum" (Quest Ensemble, 2021)
