= One Night (MK and Sonny Fodera song) =

Single by MK and Sonny Fodera featuring Raphaélla

from the album Wide Awake and In the Night Again
- Released: 15 November 2019
- Length: 2:41
- Label: Area10; Big On Blue; Sony
- Songwriters: Marc Kinchen; Sonny Fodera; Raphaélla Mazaheri-Asadi
- Producers: MK; Sonny Fodera

MK singles chronology
| "There for You" (2019) | "One Night" (2019) |

Sonny Fodera singles chronology
| "Vibrate" (2019) | "One Night" (2019) | "Flashbacks" (2020) |

"One Night" is a song by American DJ MK and Australian musician Sonny Fodera. The song was released on 15 November 2019 as the lead single from Fodera's fifth studio album, Wide Awake (2021).

== Reception ==
Petey Mac from Your EDM described the song as "electrifying" and said "'One Night' is underpinned by the soaring vocals of Raphaélla who has previously featured on tracks from the likes of Gorgon City, Rudimental and Wilkinson. They all struck gold with this one and hopefully is the start of more collaborations between these artists."

== Track listing ==
Digital download and streaming
| No. | Title | Length |
|---|---|---|
| 1. | "One Night" | 2:41 |

Remixes Digital download and streaming
| No. | Title | Length |
|---|---|---|
| 1. | "One Night" (MK dub) | 6:44 |
| 2. | "One Night" (Dom Dolla remix) | 4:27 |
| 3. | "One Night" (6am remix) | 4:04 |
| 4. | "One Night" (Nightlapse remix) | 3:13 |
| 5. | "One Night" (Mirko Di Florio remix) | 5:22 |
| 6. | "One Night" (Treasure Fingers remix) | 2:55 |

== Charts ==
Weekly chart performance for "One Night"
| Chart (2019–2020) | Peak position |
|---|---|
| Ireland (IRMA) | 50 |
| UK Singles (Official Charts) | 51 |
| UK Dance (Official Charts) | 7 |

== Certifications ==
| Region | Certification | Certified units/sales |
|---|---|---|
| United Kingdom (BPI) | Gold | 400,000^{‡} |
^{‡} Sales+streaming figures based on certification alone.
