= Smoke the Pain Away =

Single by Calvin Harris
- Released: 14 March 2025
- Genre: Dance; country; pop
- Length: 2:42
- Label: Columbia; Sony UK
- Songwriter: Adam Wiles
- Producer: Calvin Harris

Calvin Harris singles chronology
"Free" (2024)	"Smoke the Pain Away" (2025)	"Blessings" (2025)

Visualiser
- "Smoke the Pain Away" on YouTube

"Smoke the Pain Away" is a song by Scottish musician Calvin Harris. It was released as a single on March 14, 2025, by Columbia Records and Sony Music UK. It marks Harris' first song since 2018 to feature only his own vocals, and his first single since his 2024 collaboration with Ellie Goulding, "Free".

== Background and release ==
On March 6, Calvin Harris posted on his social media accounts a clip of him performing an unreleased track with a guitar and his own vocals, alongside the caption: "SMOKE THE PAIN AWAY. It's coming." According Sony Music press release, the song is a "celebration of artistic freedom, weaving together influences from [Harris] past with exciting new sounds." The song was officially released on March 14.

Writing for Rolling Stone, Larisha Paul described the track as a fusion of the country and dance music "that bubbled up in the early 2010s".

== Reception ==
"Smoke the Pain Away" received generally favorable reviews from electronic media outlets and music critics alike.

Peter Källman of Music Talkers wrote that the song that "radiates a certain warmth from the very first note", praising the production which he described as "beautifully" made and highlighted the use of the Harmonica, dubbing it as a bold choice, but that he personally loved it. Brad Stratton of Sport Playlists praised the song for showcasing Harris' "evolution as an artist", stating that the track "offers a glimpse into a more personal side of Harris", while working on his vocal abilities and "exploring a fresh approach to [his] songwriting". George Millington of GSG Media gave the song a perfect score of 5 out of 5, praising the song for being "unusual in a good way", and complimented Harris for "not being afraid to trying something new".

Nina Chiang of EDMTunes showed support for Harris "willingness to explore new musical territories" as she noticed that the track will bring a "wave of emotions and diverse reactions" from listeners. Chiang also remarked the notable shift in Harris musical direction, as it shows a "more personal side of Harris and demonstrates a deeper level of artistic expression." Brooke Bierman of EDM.com stated that Harris comeback as a vocalist "is nothing short of captivating", highlighting the DJ's signature raspy vocals which she commented forms a "euphoric chorus driven by a pulsing bassline." She also praised the song's "unique blend" of genres, defining its sound as "country, house music with a folksy twang."

In a mixed to negative review, Tom Breihan of Stereogum was not impressed by the song describing it as "It’s pretty weird!", and neither by Harris' new aesthetic which he referred to as "it appears that he’s going for a stereotypical-Vietnam-vet thing". Breihan was skeptical of Harris reasons for approaching a "festival EDM with hey-ho banjo music" now, and not when it was popular by the likes of Avicii with "Wake Me Up", and Kygo with Selena Gomez on “It Ain’t Me”, noticing that he didn't make anything like it, "not even when he was dating Taylor Swift", and now it looks that he's "attempting a Noah Kahan type of thing, but with big house drums alongside acoustic guitars and harmonica-honks."

== Personnel ==
- Calvin Harris — performer, composer, producer, mixing engineer, recording engineer
- Mike Marsh — mastering engineer

== Charts ==
=== Weekly charts ===
Weekly chart performance for "Smoke the Pain Away"
Chart (2025)	Peak position
Belgium (Ultratop 50 Flanders)	17
Belgium (Ultratop 50 Wallonia)	43
Bolivia Anglo Airplay (Monitor Latino)	7
CIS Airplay (TopHit)	171
Czech Republic Airplay (ČNS IFPI)	35
Estonia Airplay (TopHit)	4
Ireland (IRMA)	73
Latvia Airplay (LaIPA)	9
Lithuania Airplay (TopHit)	7
Malta Airplay (Radiomonitor)	10
New Zealand Hot Singles (RMNZ)	23
North Macedonia Airplay (Radiomonitor)	2
Poland (Polish Airplay Top 100)	31
Romania Airplay (TopHit)	84
Slovakia Airplay (ČNS IFPI)	49
Sweden (Sverigetopplistan)	93
UK Singles (Official Charts)	46
UK Dance (Official Charts)	7
US Hot Dance/Electronic Songs (Billboard)	8
Venezuela Anglo Airplay (Monitor Latino)	7

=== Monthly charts ===
Monthly chart performance for "Smoke the Pain Away"
Chart (2025)	Peak position
Estonia Airplay (TopHit)	15
Latvia Airplay (TopHit)	7
Lithuania Airplay (TopHit)	13

=== Year-end charts ===
2025 year-end chart performance for "Smoke the Pain Away"
Chart (2025)	Position
Estonia Airplay (TopHit)	113
Latvia Airplay (TopHit)	24
Lithuania Airplay (TopHit)	55

== Release history ==
Release dates and formats for "Smoke the Pain Away"
Region	Date	Format	Label	Ref.
Various	14 March 2025	Digital download; streaming	Columbia; Sony UK	
Italy	14 March 2025	Radio airplay	Sony Italy	
