= Ocean (Calvin Harris and Jessie Reyez song) =

2025 song by Calvin Harris and Jessie Reyez

Single by Calvin Harris and Jessie Reyez
- Released: 5 September 2025
- Length: 3:39
- Label: Sony UK
- Songwriters: Adam Wiles; Jessie Reyez; Matthew James Burns
- Producer: Calvin Harris

Calvin Harris singles chronology
"Blessings" (2025)	"Ocean" (2025)	"Release the Pressure" (2026)

Jessie Reyez singles chronology
"NYB" (2025)	"Ocean" (2025)	"N.Y.F.F" (2026)

"Ocean" is a song by Scottish DJ and record producer Calvin Harris and Canadian singer-songwriter Jessie Reyez, released on 5 September 2025 through Sony Music UK. It was written by Burns, Reyez and Harris and produced by the latter one.

== Background ==
In early May 2024, Calvin Harris shared on social media a 50-second teaser accompanied by beach imagery and the caption "summer soon". The clip showcased acoustic guitar layered with a pounding electronic beat, alongside female vocals singing lyrics such as "We were dancing, we were wild up in the ocean". Harris later confirmed in the comments that he was attempting to release the song, though he was uncertain about the timeline. Although Harris did not identify the vocalist, widespread fan speculation centered on Miley Cyrus, with many social media comments asserting that her voice was recognizable. Neither Harris nor his representatives publicly confirmed the collaboration at the time, leaving the identity of the singer unverified.

The Scottish producer then performed the unreleased song live for the first time during his set at the Tecate Emblema festival in Mexico City on 18 May 2024.

By July 2024, the teasers were removed, with some outlets reporting that contractual or creative issues with Cyrus' label had prevented its release.

In August 2025, Harris uploaded a new teaser of "Ocean" featuring Jessie Reyez's vocals. The producer's responses to questions about Cyrus' absence – including "I dunno" and "tell her" – led to speculation that tensions had arisen between the two artists.

Harris later denied any disagreement with Cyrus, clarifying in comments that the change was due to "crossed wires" and adding that he "loves Miley" and considered her to have "an amazing voice". He also stated that Reyez had co-written the track and had been involved from the outset, while confirming that the version with Cyrus' vocals would not be released.

== Critical reception ==
"Ocean" received generally positive reviews from critics, with Katie Bain of Billboard describing as "urgently pretty", noting the interplay of guitar textures with subtle psytrance elements. Liana Stern of Dancing Astronaut highlighted its "perfect balance between dancefloor energy and melodic storytelling", calling it "powerful and irresistibly catchy", while Ansh Talim of EDM.com praised the arrangement's balance, pointing to the "honeyed guitar riff", fluid bassline and house rhythm that pair with Harris' "contagious groove".

== Charts ==
=== Weekly charts ===
Weekly chart performance for "Ocean"
Chart (2025–2026)	Peak position
Argentina Anglo Airplay (Monitor Latino)	15
Belarus Airplay (TopHit)	172
Canada CHR/Top 40 (Billboard)	22
Central America Anglo Airplay (Monitor Latino)	12
Colombia Anglo Airplay (Monitor Latino)	13
CIS Airplay (TopHit)	39
Costa Rica Anglo Airplay (Monitor Latino)	10
Croatia International Airplay (Top lista)	26
Estonia Airplay (TopHit)	6
Germany Airplay (BVMI)	89
Guatemala Anglo Airplay (Monitor Latino)	4
Honduras Anglo Airplay (Monitor Latino)	7
Ireland (IRMA)	79
Japan Hot Overseas (Billboard Japan)	16
Kazakhstan Airplay (TopHit)	84
Latin America Anglo Airplay (Monitor Latino)	19
Latvia Airplay (LaIPA)	15
Lithuania Airplay (TopHit)	6
Malta Airplay (Radiomonitor)	9
Moldova Airplay (TopHit)	98
New Zealand Hot Singles (RMNZ)	12
Nicaragua Anglo Airplay (Monitor Latino)	3
North Macedonia Airplay (Radiomonitor)	3
Panama Anglo Airplay (Monitor Latino)	10
Paraguay Anglo Airplay (Monitor Latino)	15
Poland (Polish Airplay Top 100)	8
Romania Airplay (TopHit)	123
Russia Airplay (TopHit)	54
Slovakia Airplay (ČNS IFPI)	42
UK Singles (Official Charts)	34
UK Dance (Official Charts)	6
US Hot Dance/Electronic Songs (Billboard)	5
Venezuela Anglo Airplay (Monitor Latino)	5

=== Monthly charts ===
Monthly chart performance for "Ocean"
Chart (2025–2026)	Peak position
CIS Airplay (TopHit)	51
Estonia Airplay (TopHit)	8
Latvia Airplay (TopHit)	4
Lithuania Airplay (TopHit)	14
Russia Airplay (TopHit)	65

=== Year-end charts ===
Year-end chart performance for "Ocean"
Chart (2025)	Position
Estonia Airplay (TopHit)	45
Latvia Airplay (TopHit)	54
Lithuania Airplay (TopHit)	180

== Release history ==
Release dates and formats for "Ocean"
Region	Date	Format	Label	Ref.
Various	5 September 2025	Digital download; streaming	Sony UK	
Italy	12 September 2025	Radio airplay	Sony Italy	
