= Blythe Pepino =

English musician (born 1986)

- Born: Blythe Constance Rose Pepino; 12 March 1986 (age 40)
- Origin: Herefordshire
- Genres: Art pop; electronica; dance music
- Occupations: Musician, activist
- Instrument: Vocalist
- Years active: 2003–present
- Member of: Mesadorm
- Formerly of: BiZali, Vaults

Blythe Constance Rose Pepino (born 12 March 1986) is an English musician. She featured on Sonny Fodera's "Mind Still", which charted at No. 68 on the UK singles chart, and has released albums as part of BiZali, its successor Mesadorm, and Vaults. Pepino also founded the #eachbodysready and BirthStrike campaigns and helped erect shelters at Calais Jungle.

== Biography ==
Blythe Constance Rose Pepino was born on 12 March 1986 in Herefordshire, England. She was named after Blythe Danner and attended St Mary's Roman Catholic High School, Lugwardine and Hereford Sixth Form College, the latter between 2002 and 2004. She and Aaron Zahl formed BiZali in autumn 2003 after being asked to sing at his brother's wedding; by November 2006, the pair had enrolled at the University of Bristol and recruited two further members. BiZali had released the album Dance Yourself Alone by November 2009; reviewing for Sound on Sound, Joe Inglis felt that there was "more than a touch of the Beth Gibbons" about Pepino, who "rarely turn[ed] the intensity dial down below 10". The quartet subsequently formed the quintet Mesadorm and released the albums Heterogaster in 2018 and Epicadus in 2019.

Pepino formed Vaults in 2013 with Barney Freeman and Ben Vella after meeting them through a mutual friend and asking her to provide vocals for their track "Vultures". They released the track "One Last Night", which appeared on the soundtrack to Fifty Shades of Grey, and the track "One Day I'll Fly Away", which soundtracked the 2016 John Lewis Christmas advert. The band's sound has been described as "very synthy", art-pop, and electronica. They also released the EPs Vultures (2014) and Cry No More (2015) and the album Caught in Still Life (2016); they split in May 2017.

In 2015, after taking offense at posters by Protein World featuring a woman in a bikini asking "Are you beach body ready?", Pepino mounted the #eachbodysready vandalism campaign against the adverts. She travelled with The Brighton Shelter Build Project to the Calais Jungle in January 2016; while there, she helped erect 13 flat-pack shelters, which each housed up to six refugees and survived until the camp was cleared in October. That year, she was interviewed by The Independent about her polyamorous lifestyle; at the time, she was in relationships with her partner, another couple, and another woman. She was two years into a different relationship in March 2019.

In late 2018, she was horrified by an Extinction Rebellion lecture and began attending their demonstrations, during which she was arrested several times. The following March, she co-founded BirthStrike and appeared on Tucker Carlson Tonight to explain herself. Group members vowed "not to bear children due to the severity of the ecological crisis and the current inaction of governing forces in the face if this existential threat" [sic]. Pepino has stated that her intention was to use her social privilege as a middle class white woman to affect change quickly and that she suffered from "rape jokes, violent hatred and misogyny" as a result of the campaign. After burning out and disbanding BirthStrike in summer 2021, she released a solo recording in 2024 with Sonny Fodera's "Mind Still", which peaked at No. 68 on the UK singles chart.
