= Sonny Fodera =

UK-based Australian house music producer

- Born: 10 November 1985 (age 40); Adelaide, South Australia, Australia
- Genres: EDM, house
- Occupations: DJ; producer
- Years active: 2007–present
- Labels: Solotoko; Defected; Cajual
- Website: sonnyfodera.com

Sonny Fodera is an Australian house DJ and producer, based in London, England. Known for his vocal-driven, pop-forward songs, Fodera has released six albums.

He has collaborated with and remixed artists such as Calvin Harris, Glass Animals, MK, Green Velvet, Diplo, Sinéad Harnett, and Ella Eyre.

== Career ==
=== Early career ===
Fodera grew up in Adelaide, Australia, where he began working on hip hop beats in his mid-teens. At age 18, he was inspired to start creating house music after seeing American DJ Derrick Carter perform at a nightclub. At 23, he began touring in the United States and the United Kingdom. DJ Gene Farris asked Fodera to remix his track "Dance Warriors" for Green Velvet's label Cajual Records, who released Fodera's first two albums Moving Forward in 2013 and After Parties & Aeroplanes in 2014. In 2013, MixMag named Fodera as one of their "Hot Six".

=== 2016–2018: Frequently Flying ===
In early 2016, Fodera released an In the House mix compilation on Defected Records and completed a 30-date tour of the UK, US, and Australia. That summer, Fodera performed at several festivals including EDC Las Vegas, Creamfields, and Hideout, and released his first Essential Mix for BBC Radio 1 in August. After releasing the single "You & I" in October, Fodera released his album Frequently Flying in November on Defected Records. Fodera promoted the album with a 16-date North American tour in November which included performances at EDC Orlando and Escape: Psycho Circus. That year, Fodera reached #2 in the UK and Europe and #1 in Australia on the Beatport club DJ chart.

In early 2017, Fodera launched his record label Solotoko and released his single "Set Me Free" through it. In June, Fodera released a deluxe version of Frequently Flying, followed by US and UK tours in October.

In 2018, Fodera performed at Splash House and the Reading and Leeds festivals, as well as an 8-week headline residency at Cuckoo Land at Ibiza Rocks Hotel over the summer. That October, Fodera released two remixes of Calvin Harris's "Promises".

=== 2019–2020: Rise ===
After performances at CRSSD Festival and the DoLab stage at Coachella in March and April 2019, Fodera released his album Rise on Insomniac Records and Solotoko in July. That summer, Fodera returned to Cuckoo Land for an 11-week headline residency, and performed on tour in the UK and the US with Dom Dolla in the fall. Fodera also released his Vibrate EP with Biscits in October and the single "One Night" with MK in November, which hit the Official Singles Chart and has since been certified gold in the UK.

In 2020, Fodera released the singles "Before U" with King Henry featuring AlunaGeorge in March, "Moving Blind" with Dom Dolla in March, and "Wired" featuring Ella Eyre and "Turn Back Time" with Diplo in November.

=== 2021–2023: Wide Awake ===
After remixing Glass Animals' "Heat Waves" in February and releasing his single "Nah" with Sinéad Harnett, Fodera released his album Wide Awake in October 2021.

In April 2022, Fodera released a deluxe version of Wide Awake with three additional tracks. The same month, Fodera released the single "Need You" as part of Spotify's mint Singles series. Fodera performed a 16-week residency at Amnesia in Ibiza with Gorgon City that summer.

=== 2023–present: Can We Do It All Again? ===
Fodera's sixth studio album Can We Do It All Again? was released on 12 June 2026. The album debuted at number 49 on the ARIA Albums Chart, his first appearance on that chart.

== Discography ==
=== Albums ===
List of albums by Sonny Fodera
Title	Details	Peak chart positions		
Title	Details	AUS	IRE	UK
Moving Forward	Released: February 2013; Label: Cajual (CAJ348); Format: Digital	—	—	—
After Parties & Aeroplanes	Released: 2014; Label: Cajual (CAJ364); Format: Digital	—	—	—
Frequently Flying	Released: November 2016; Label: Defected (SFFF01CD); Format: Digital, CD	—	—	— (Note: Frequently Flying did not enter the top 100 of the UK Albums Chart, but peaked at number 85 on UK downloads chart.)
Rise	Released: July 2019; Label: Solotoko (SOLOTOKO 030); Format: Digital, 2×LP	—	—	— (Note: Rise did not enter the top 100 of the UK Albums Chart, but peaked at number 58 on UK downloads chart.)
Wide Awake	Released: October 2021; Label: Solotoko (SOLOTOKO 100); Format: Digital, CD, LP	—	—	47
Can We Do It All Again?	Released: 12 June 2026; Label: Solotoko (SOLOTOKO 250); Format: Digital, CD, 2×LP	49	95	20
"—" denotes a recording that did not chart in that territory.

=== Charted and certified singles ===
List of charted or certified singles by Sonny Fodera
Title	Year	Peak chart positions				Certifications	Album
Title	Year	AUS	IRE	NZ Hot	UK	Certifications	Album
"To Love" (featuring Shannon Saunders)	2016	—	—	—	—	BPI: Silver	Frequently Flying
"Always Gonna Be" (featuring Alex Mills)	2017	—	—	—	—	BPI: Silver	Frequently Flying
"One Night" (with MK featuring Raphaélla)	2019	—	50	—	51	BPI: Gold	Wide Awake
"Turn Back Time" (with Diplo)	2020	—	—	—	—	BPI: Silver; RMNZ: Gold	Wide Awake
"Moving Blind" (with Dom Dolla)	2020	—	—	—	—	ARIA: Gold	Non-album single
"Asking" (with MK featuring Clementine Douglas)	2023	—	9	—	7	ARIA: Platinum; BPI: 2× Platinum; RMNZ: Gold	Can We Do It All Again?
"Life Lesson" (with Jazzy and Belters Only)	2023	—	23	—	—	BPI: Silver	Non-album single
"Never Be Alone" (with Becky Hill)	2024	—	64	—	23	BPI: Silver	Believe Me Now?
"Mind Still" (featuring Blythe)	2024	—	77	—	68	ARIA: Gold; BPI: Silver	Can We Do It All Again?
"Somedays" (with Jazzy and D.O.D)	2024	26	5	16	5	ARIA: 3× Platinum; BPI: 2× Platinum; RMNZ: Gold	No Bad Vibes and Can We Do It All Again?
"Tell Me" (with Clementine Douglas)	2025	—	50	—	23	BPI: Gold	Can We Do It All Again?
"All This Time" (with Jazzy)	2025	—	—	—	51	BPI: Silver	Can We Do It All Again?
"Think About Us" (with D.O.D. and Poppy Baskcomb)	2025	48	24	1	18	ARIA: Gold; BPI: Gold; RMNZ: Gold	Can We Do It All Again?
"My Loving" (with Chrystal)	2026	—	—	27	66		Can We Do It All Again?
"Let Me Be in Your Arms" (with Libianca)	2026	—	—	—	64		Can We Do It All Again?
"Feel Again"	2026	—	—	28	—		Can We Do It All Again?
"Say Something" (with Becky Hill)	2026	—	—	13	73		Non-album single
"—" denotes a recording that did not chart in that territory.

== Awards and nominations ==
=== APRA Music Awards ===
The APRA Music Awards were established by Australasian Performing Right Association (APRA) in 1982 to honour the achievements of songwriters and music composers, and to recognise their song writing skills, sales and airplay performance, by its members annually.

Year	Nominee / work	Award	Result	Ref.
2026	"Tell Me" by Sonny Fodera & Clementine Douglas (Stuart Crichton / Sonny Fodera / Clementine Douglas / Ruth Cunningham)	Most Performed Australian Work	Nominated	
2026	"Tell Me" by Sonny Fodera & Clementine Douglas (Stuart Crichton / Sonny Fodera / Clementine Douglas / Ruth Cunningham)	Most Performed Dance/Electronic Work	Won	

=== ARIA Music Awards ===
The ARIA Music Awards is an annual awards ceremony held by the Australian Recording Industry Association. They commenced in 1987.

Year	Nominee / work	Award	Result	Ref.
2025	"Somedays" (with Jazzy & D.O.D.)	Best Dance/Electronic Release	Nominated	
2025	"Somedays" (with Jazzy & D.O.D.)	Song of the Year	Nominated	
2026	"Think About Us" (with D.O.D. and Poppy Baskcomb)	Song of the Year	Nominated	

=== Brit Awards ===
The Brit Awards is a ceremony presented by British Phonographic Industry (BPI) to recognise the best in British and international music.

Year	Nominee / work	Award	Result	Ref.
2025	"Somedays" (with Jazzy and D.O.D.)	Song of the Year	Nominated	

=== Electronic Dance Music Awards ===
The Electronic Dance Music Awards are presented by iHeart Radio and commenced in 2022.

Year	Nominee / work	Award	Result	Ref.
2022	"Turn Back Time" (with Diplo)	UK House Song of the Year	Nominated	
2025	"Somedays" (with Jazzy and D.O.D)	Dance Song of the Year	Nominated	
2025	"Somedays" (with Jazzy and D.O.D)	House Song of the Year	Nominated	
2026	"All This Time" (with Jazzy)	House Song of the Year	Nominated	
