= Asking (song) =

Single by Sonny Fodera with MK featuring Clementine Douglas

from the album Can We Do It All Again? and In the Night Again
- Released: 7 July 2023
- Genre: House
- Length: 3:11
- Label: Solotoko
- Songwriters: Sonny Fodera; Marc Kinchen; Clementine Douglas
- Producers: Sonny Fodera; Marc Kinchen

Sonny Fodera singles chronology
"Like I Used To" (2023)	"Asking" (2023)	"Life Lesson" (2023)

MK singles chronology
"Rhyme Dust" (2023)	"Asking" (2023)	"Drinkin'" (2023)

Clementine Douglas singles chronology
"Enchanté" (2022)	"Asking" (2023)	"Something to Hold to" (2023)

"Asking" is a song by Australian musician Sonny Fodera and American DJ and record producer MK featuring British vocalist Clementine Douglas. The song was released on 7 July 2023 as the lead single from Fodera's sixth studio album, Can We Do It All Again? (2026)

The song peaked inside the UK Singles Chart top ten, becoming the first top ten in that territory for Sonny Fodera and Clementine Douglas and MK's second.

== Track listing ==
Digital download and streaming
No.	Title	Length
1.	"Asking"	3:11

Digital download and streaming
No.	Title	Length
1.	"Asking" (K Motionz remix)	2:48
2.	"Asking"	3:11
3.	"Asking" (Joshwa remix)	3:01

Digital download and streaming
No.	Title	Length
1.	"Asking" (Tiësto remix)	3:12

Digital download and streaming
No.	Title	Length
1.	"Asking" (Chill mix)	2:58

Digital download and streaming
No.	Title	Length
1.	"Asking" (Jae Depz remix)	3:36
2.	"Asking" (ROC remix)	3:01
3.	"Asking" (Tasso remix)	3:01

== Charts ==
=== Weekly charts ===
Weekly chart performance for "Asking"
Chart (2023)	Peak position
Ireland (IRMA)	9
UK Singles (Official Charts)	7
UK Dance (Official Charts)	3
UK Indie (Official Charts)	1

=== Year-end charts ===
Year-end chart performance for "Asking"
Chart (2024)	Position
UK Singles (OCC)	49

== Certifications ==
Certifications for "Asking"
Region	Certification	Certified units/sales
Australia (ARIA)	Platinum	70,000^{‡}
New Zealand (RMNZ)	Gold	15,000^{‡}
United Kingdom (BPI)	2× Platinum	1,200,000^{‡}
^{‡} Sales+streaming figures based on certification alone.
