= D.O.D. (DJ) =

British disc jockey and music executive (born 1990)

D.O.D
- Born: Daniel Eugene O'Donnell; 5 April 1990 (age 36); Bury, Greater Manchester, England
- Genres: Progressive house; electro house; bass house
- Occupations: Musician; DJ; record producer
- Instruments: Keyboard; guitar; synthesizer
- Years active: 2009–present
- Labels: Spinnin'; Mixmash; Fool's Gold; Fly Eye; Wall Recordings; Ones to Watch
- Website: www.djdod.com

Daniel O'Donnell (born 5 April 1990), better known as D.O.D, is a British DJ and record producer. He debuted at number 96 at the DJ Mag Top 100 DJs list.

== Biography ==
Active since 2009, D.O.D was supported at his beginning by renowned artists such as Laidback Luke, with Mixmash Records hosting most of D.O.D's productions.

A collaboration between him and Laidback Luke, called "Flashing Lights", was released in April 2014.

D.O.D performed at Ultra Europe in 2016. D.O.D released "Blip" on 7 November 2016, with which he decided to define his own genre. He dubbed this new sound "Future Jack". The song was primarily characterised by its heavy electronic sounds and repetitive nature. Many of the sounds are reminiscent of a song he released earlier that year called "Taking You Back", which Afrojack worked on as well. His following releases "Don't Wait" with Tommy Trash and "Ghetto" continued this sound.

== Discography ==
=== Extended plays ===
Title	Year	Label
Hoy Es?	2010	Pro-Zak Trax
More Cowbell	2013	Ones to Watch Records
Fire	2013	Ones to Watch Records

=== Charting singles ===
Title	Year	Peak chart positions					Certifications	Album
Title	Year	UK	UK Dance	AUS	BEL (Fl)	IRE	Certifications	Album
"Bananas"	2014	—	—	—	—^{[A]}	—		Non-album singles
"Still Sleepless" (featuring Carla Monroe)	2021	46	15	—	—	25	BPI: Gold	Non-album singles
"So Much in Love"	2023	15	8	—	—	22	BPI: Platinum	Non-album singles
"Won't Forget You" (with Jax Jones and Ina Wroldsen)	2023	28	11	—	—	—	BPI: Silver	Non-album singles
"Somedays" (with Sonny Fodera and Jazzy)	2024	5	1	26	—	5	ARIA: 2× Platinum; BPI: Platinum	Can We Do It All Again?
"Think About Us" (with Sonny Fodera and Poppy Baskcomb)	2025	18	5	48	—	24	ARIA: Gold; BPI: Gold	Can We Do It All Again?
"—" denotes a recording that did not chart or was not released in that territory.

=== Remixes and edits ===
- 2009: Chris Brown featuring Lil Wayne and Swizz Beatz – "I Can Transform Ya" (D.O.D Remix) [Jive]
- 2010: Lil Wayne featuring Drake – "Right Above It" (D.O.D Remix) [Young Money]
- 2011: Laidback Luke, Lil Jon and Steve Aoki – "Turbulence" (D.O.D Remix) [Bitrate Records]
- 2012: DJ Fresh featuring Dizzee Rascal – "The Power" (D.O.D Remix) [Ministry of Sound]
- 2013: Laidback Luke and Dimitri Vegas & Like Mike – "MORE" (D.O.D Remix) [Mixmash Records]
- 2014: Laidback Luke and Project 46 – "Collide" (featuring Collin McLoughlin) (D.O.D Remix) [Mixmash Records]
- 2014: DJ Jean – "The Launch" (D.O.D Remix Radio Edit) [Dizplay Recordings]
- 2015: Shawn Mendes – "Stitches" (D.O.D Remix) [Island Records]
- 2016: Justin Timberlake – Can't Stop the Feeling! [RCA Records]
- 2017: Afrojack and David Guetta featuring Ester Dean – "Another Life" (D.O.D Remix) [Wall Recordings]
- 2018: Cedric Gervais featuring Wealth - "One Night" (D.O.D Remix) [Island Records]
- 2018: Rebecca & Fiona vs D.O.D - "Need You" (D.O.D Remix) [Stereo Stereo]
- 2018: Le Cheval - "Fandango" (D.O.D Remix)
- 2019: Steve Angello and Laidback Luke - "Be" (D.O.D Remix)
- 2021: Afrojack and Chico Rose - "You Got The Love" (D.O.D Remix)

== Notes ==
- A "Bananas" did not enter the Ultratop 50, but peaked at number 14 on the Dance Bubbling Under chart.
