= Just Kiddin =

British electronic music production duo

- Origin: Kettering, Northamptonshire, England
- Genres: Electronic
- Years active: 2010–present
- Members: Lewis Thompson; Laurie Revell

Just Kiddin are a British electronic music production duo composed of Lewis Thompson and Laurie Revell. The duo is from Kettering, Northamptonshire, England, and formed in 2010. Just Kiddin have remixed the likes of Usher, Parachute Youth, and Theophilus London, and have released original material on labels such as HK, Top Billin, La Valigetta, Sweat It Out, and Nurvous. Just Kiddin have received BBC Radio 1 support from Annie Mac, Nick Grimshaw, B.Traits and Rob Da Bank.

== Discography ==
=== Extended plays ===
Year	EP	Label
2012	Wildlife	La Valigetta
2013	Zurprize / Spritzer	Paranoiak
2013	Intimacy	Nurvous
2013	Time, Space & Honey	HK
2015	Getaway	n/a

=== Singles ===
Year	Song	Label	Notes/Charts
2011	"All the Way to Love"	Top Billin	
2013	"Ocean Motion"	SubSoul	
2013	"Feeling Better"	Eton Messy	
2013	"Thinking About It"	FFRR Records/Eton Messy	
2017	"Sweetest Thing"	Selected	
2018	"Indiana"	Sony Music	
2019	"There for you"	XVII Music	
2019	"Hurting"	3 Beat Records	
2021	"Risk It All" (with Ella Henderson and House Gospel Choir)	Major Tom's/Asylum	Charted at 100 on UK Singles Chart

=== Remixes ===
Year	Song	Artist
2012	"Can't Get Better Than This"	Parachute Youth
2012	"Climax"	Usher
2012	"Love Is Real" (featuring Holly Miranda)	Theophilus London
2012	"Why Even Try" (featuring Sara Quin)	Theophilus London
2012	"How To Feel"	King Dinosaur
2013	"No Eyes" (featuring Jaw)	Claptone
2014	"The Sun II"	Snakadaktal
2014	"Deckchairs on the Moon"	Bipolar Sunshine
2014	"Uptight Downtown"	La Roux
2014	"Losing"	Becky Hill
2015	"Something About You"	Hayden James
2021	"Our Song"	Anne Marie and Niall Horan
2021	"Remember"	Becky Hill and David Guetta
