= Clementine Douglas =

British singer-songwriter

- Born: 29 December 1991 (age 34); Birmingham, England
- Genres: House; electronic; dance-pop
- Occupations: Singer; songwriter
- Instrument: Vocals
- Years active: 2014–present
- Label: Platoon

Clementine Maria Josephine Douglas (born 29 December 1991) is a British singer and songwriter from Birmingham, England who collaborates with popular DJs and producers.

== Early life ==
Douglas was born in Birmingham, England in 1991. She is of British, Jamaican, and Irish descent.

== Career ==
From the mid-2010s, Douglas was part of the band Kudu Blue. In 2019, the four-piece were featured on the BBC Introducing stage at Glastonbury Festival.

Douglas won Dance Vocalist of the Year at the 2022 BBC Radio 1 Dance Awards.

Douglas was featured on Sonny Fodera's 2023 single "Asking", released on 7 July 2023. The song peaked at number 7 on the UK Singles Chart and was later certified platinum by the Australian Recording Industry Association (ARIA). In August 2023, Douglas collaborated with Alesso and Dillon Francis on the single "Free". The song, which features Douglas' vocals, was intended for listeners to experience great happiness, to feel like "a golden retriever living the best day of its life", according to Francis.

== Discography ==
=== Extended plays ===
List of EPs, with selected details
Title	Details
Trust	Released: 30 October 2026; Format: digital; Label: Warner Music UK

=== As lead artist ===
List of singles as a lead artist, showing year released and album name
Title	Year	Peak chart positions								Certifications	Album
Title	Year	UK	UK Dance	CIS Air.	IRE	LAT Air.	LTU Air.	POL Air.	RUS Air.	Certifications	Album
"Here with Me" (with Dillon Nathaniel)	2021	—	—	—	—	—	—	—	—		Non-album singles
"Black Light" (with SJAY Music & Jack Wins)	2022	—	—	—	—	—	—	—	—		Non-album singles
"99 Degrees" (with Crvvcks & Sigma)	2022	—	—	—	—	—	—	—	—		Non-album singles
"Miracle Maker" (with Dom Dolla)	2022	—	—	—	—	—	—	—	—		Non-album singles
"Asking" (with Sonny Fodera & MK)	2023	7	3	—	9	—	—	—	—	BPI: 2× Platinum	Can We Do It All Again?
"Riddles"	2024	— (Note: "Riddles" did not enter the UK Singles Chart, but peaked at number 83 on the UK Physical Singles Chart.)	—	—	—	—	—	—	—		Non-album single
"Ain't Giving Up" (with Duke Dumont)	2024	56	—	—	—	—	—	—	—		Union
"True"	2024	— (Note: "True" did not enter the UK Singles Chart, but peaked at number 78 on the UK Singles Download Chart and number 91 on the UK Physical Singles Chart.)	—	—	—	—	—	—	—		Non-album single
"Tell Me" (with Sonny Fodera)	2025	26	3	—	50	2	100	25	—	BPI: Silver	Can We Do It All Again?
"Blessings" (with Calvin Harris)	2025	3	1	2	5	1	3	3	3	BPI: Platinum; ZPAV: Gold	Non-album singles
"Come Find Me" (with MK)	2025	50	7	—	—	1	13	—	—	BPI: Silver	Non-album singles
"Trust"	2026	—	—	—	—	—	—	—	—		Trust
"No Trouble"	2026	—	—	—	—	—	—	—	—		
"—" denotes a recording that did not chart in that territory.

=== As featured artist ===
List of singles as a featured artist, with select chart positions and certifications, showing year released and album name
Title	Year	Peak chart positions										Certifications	Album
Title	Year	UK	UK Dance	BLR Air.	CIS Air.	IRE	LAT Air.	LTU Air.	MDA Air.	ROM Air.	RUS Air.	Certifications	Album
"Desire" (uncredited vocals for Sub Focus & Dimension)	2018	51	8	*	—	—	—	—	*	—	—	BPI: Gold	Organ
"Out of Time" (Wh0 featuring Clementine Douglas)	2021	—	—	*	—	—	—	—	*	—	—		Non-album singles
"Forever" (Tommy Farrow featuring Clementine Douglas)	2021	—	—	*	—	—	—	—	*	—	—		Non-album singles
"Mixed Emotions" (uncredited vocals for Chase & Status)	2022	44	—	*	—	—	—	—	*	—	—	BPI: Gold	What Came Before
"Cure My Desire" (Hannah Wants featuring Clementine Douglas)	2022	—	—	*	—	—	—	—	*	—	—	BPI: Silver	Non-album singles
"Chale" (Riton, Major League DJz and King Promise featuring Clementine Douglas)	2022	—	—	*	—	—	—	—	*	27	—		Non-album singles
"Something to Hold On to" (David Guetta and Morten featuring Clementine Douglas)	2023	—	—	—	—	—	—	108	—	—	—		Non-album singles
"Say the Word" (Chase & Status featuring Clementine Douglas)	2023	78	32	—	—	—	—	—	—	—	—		2 Ruff, Vol. 1
"Happier" (The Blessed Madonna featuring Clementine Douglas)	2024	17	2	—	—	25	—	—	—	—	—	BPI: Platinum	Non-album singles
"Body Talk" (Alok featuring Clementine Douglas)	2024	—	—	166	76	—	4	2	85	—	54		Non-album singles
"—" denotes a recording that did not chart or was not released in that territory. "*" denotes that the chart did not exist at that time.

=== Songwriting credits ===
List of songs written or co-written for other artists, showing year released and album name
Title	Year	Artist	Album	Notes
"Pulling Me Back"	2026	Jax Jones	Non-album single	Co-written and uncredited vocals
"Gone"	2026	Paloma Faith	In Full Colour!	Co-written

== Awards and nominations ==
=== APRA Music Awards ===
The APRA Music Awards were established by Australasian Performing Right Association (APRA) in 1982 to honour the achievements of songwriters and music composers, and to recognise their song writing skills, sales and airplay performance, by its members annually.

Year	Nominee / work	Award	Result	Ref.
2026	"Tell Me" by Sonny Fodera & Clementine Douglas (Stuart Crichton / Sonny Fodera / Clementine Douglas / Ruth Cunningham)	Most Performed Australian Work	Nominated	
2026	"Tell Me" by Sonny Fodera & Clementine Douglas (Stuart Crichton / Sonny Fodera / Clementine Douglas / Ruth Cunningham)	Most Performed Dance/Electronic Work	Won	

=== Electronic Dance Music Awards ===
The Electronic Dance Music Awards (also known as the EDMAs) is an annual music award event focusing across most all electronic dance music genres. It commenced in 2022.

Year	Nominee / work	Award	Result	Ref.
2026	Herself	Vocalist of the Year	Nominated	
2026	"Blessings" — Calvin Harris, Clementine Douglas	Dance / Electro Pop Song of the Year	Nominated	
