= Only Honest on the Weekend =

Studio album by Becky Hill
- Released: 27 August 2021
- Genres: Pop; dance
- Length: 45:28
- Label: Polydor
- Producers: Jussi; Lostboy; Mark Ralph; Lucas Nord; MK; Shift K3Y; Jarly; Svidden; David Guetta; Luke Storrs; MJ Cole; Topic; Josh Wilkinson; Billen Ted; Banx & Ranx; MNEK; Sigala; 220 Kid; Joel Corry; Lewis Thomson; Neave Applebaum; Rob Harvey; Jordan Riley; Bloodshy; Y3LLO KOALA; David Saint Fleur; Christopher Tempest; Mr. Whistler; Stint; Wilkinson; Toby Le Messurier Scott; Netsky

Becky Hill chronology
Get to Know (2019)	Only Honest on the Weekend (2021)	Christmas (2021)

Singles from Only Honest on the Weekend
- 1. "Better Off Without You" Released: 10 January 2020; 2. "Heaven on My Mind" Released: 25 June 2020; 3. "Last Time" Released: 26 March 2021; 4. "Remember" Released: 18 June 2021; 5. "My Heart Goes (La Di Da)" Released: 24 August 2021

Only Honest on the Weekend is the debut studio album by English singer Becky Hill, released on 27 August 2021 through Eko and Polydor Records. The album was preceded by the release of five singles over the course of 2020 and 2021: "Better Off Without You", "Heaven on My Mind", "Last Time", "Remember" and "My Heart Goes (La Di Da)", all of which reached the top 40 of the UK Singles Chart. It includes collaborations with Shift K3Y, David Guetta, Topic, S1mba, Ella Eyre, Banx & Ranx, Sigala and 220 Kid.

A deluxe edition, released in March, included the single "Run" featuring Galantis and was updated again in August 2022, with "History" with Joel Corry and "Crazy What Love Can Do", with Guetta and Ella Henderson.

Only Honest on the Weekend peaked at number seven on the UK Albums Chart and has been certified platinum.

== Critical reception ==
Alim Kheraj, reviewing Only Honest on the Weekend for The Guardian, gave the album one star out of five, describing its tracks as "seemingly designed for fast fashion adverts during Love Island, with over-stuffed production that's about as robust and long-lasting as the minidresses sold therein". Kheraj also summarised the album as "disposable" and a "conveyor belt of blandness" that makes one wonder why Hill "bothered to make" it as "[p]erhaps after waiting nearly a decade to be allowed to release an album, Hill's enthusiasm had just run dry". Conversely, Clash's Caitlin Sibthorpe scored the album seven out of 10, calling it an "unstoppable pop banger" with "sensational guest stars" and "faultless production" that make it "even more tantalizing". Sibthorpe felt that "the versatility of the album will produce mass adoration". Neil McCormick for The Telegraph awarded the album three stars out of five and found that while Hill "sings beautifully and has energy to burn", "this is more like a pop data dump than a crafted debut album".

Professional ratings
Review scores
Source	Rating
Clash	7/10
The Guardian	1/5 stars
The Telegraph	3/5 stars

== Commercial performance ==
Only Honest on the Weekend debuted at number seven on the UK Album Charts and stayed in the top 100 for an initial 11 weeks. The album, following its deluxe edition release, re-entered the chart in March 2022 at number 15 and returned to its peak position in August 2022 following Hill's performance at the final of the UEFA Women's Euro 2022 championship. The album also saw a resurgence in popularity on the Irish Album Charts as well reaching a new peak of number 5.

== Track listing ==
Only Honest on the Weekend track listing
No.	Title	Writer(s)	Producer(s)	Length
1.	"I Got You"	Rebecca Claire Hill; Justin Tranter; Jussi Ilmari Karvinen	Jussi	3:10
2.	"Last Time"	Hill; Negin Djafari; Peter Rycroft; Thomas Mann	Lostboy; Mark Ralph^{[a]}; Ryan Ashley^{[v]}	3:34
3.	"Make It Hard to Love You"	Hill; Lucas Nordqvist; Marc Kinchen; Jon Eyden; Uzoechi Emenike	Lucas Nord; MK; Ralph^{[a]}	3:19
4.	"Better Off Without You" (with Shift K3Y)	Hill; Lewis Shay Jankel	Shift K3Y; Jarly; Svidden	3:18
5.	"Remember" (with David Guetta)	Hill; David Guetta; Karen Ann Poole; Kye Elliot Sones; Lewis Thompson; Luke Storrs	Guetta; Storrs; Scott Lowe^{[a]}	2:41
6.	"Perfect People"	Hill; Matthew Coleman; Bryn Christopher; Charlotte Haining; Luke Fitton	MJ Cole; Ashley^{[v]}	3:03
7.	"My Heart Goes (La Di Da)" (with Topic)	Hill; Carl Nordström; Haining; Josh Wilkinson; Victor Bolander	Topic; Wilkinson	2:28
8.	"Could Be My Somebody" (with S1mba)	Hill; Thomas Hollings; Samuel Brennan; Michael Stafford; Leonard Simbarashe Rwodzi	Billen Ted; Ashley^{[v]}	3:15
9.	"Business" (with Ella Eyre)	Hill; Emenike; Ella McMahon	Banx & Ranx; MNEK	3:17
10.	"Waiting Not Looking"	Hill; Tom Aspaul; Oscar Hill	Hill	2:04
11.	"Distance"	Hill; Coleman; Anne-Marie Nicholson; Adam Argyle; Tomas Jules	Cole; Ashley^{[v]}	2:55
12.	"Lessons" (with Banx & Ranx)	Hill; Yannick Rastogi; Zacharie Raymond; Lauren Amber Aquilina; Clément Langlois-Légaré	Banx & Ranx; Ashley^{[v]}	3:07
13.	"Heaven on My Mind" (with Sigala)	Hill; Ryan Campbell; Emenike; Bruce Fielder; Joakim Jarl; George Astasio; Ida Martinsen Botten; Jason Pebworth; Jon Shave	Jarly; Sigala; Ashley^{[v]}	3:13
14.	"Is Anybody There"	Hill; Emenike; Rastogi; Raymond; Campbell	Banx & Ranx; Ashley^{[v]}	3:16
15.	"Through the Night" (with 220 Kid)	Hill; Emenike; William Graydon	Billen Ted; 220 Kid^{[c]}; Ashley^{[v]}	2:48
Total length:				45:28

Digital Deluxe Disc 1 track listing
No.	Title	Writer(s)	Producer(s)	Length
1.	"History" (with Joel Corry)	Poole; Thompson; Hill; Clementine Douglas; Joel Corry; Neave Applebaum; Rob Harvey	Corry; Thompson; Applebaum	2:57
2.	"Crazy What Love Can Do" (with David Guetta and Ella Henderson)	Ella Henderson; Hill; Guetta; Jordan Riley; Thompson; Applebaum; Harvey	Guetta; Harvey; Riley; Thompson; Applebaum	2:50
3.	"Run" (with Galantis)	Emenike; Hill; Christian Karlsson; Christopher Tempest; David Saint Fleur; Jordi de Fluiter; Y3LLO KOALA	Bloodshy; Y3LLO KOALA; David Saint Fleur; Christopher Tempest; Mr. Whistler	3:10
4.	"I Got You"			3:10
5.	"Last Time"			3:34
6.	"Make It Hard to Love You"			3:19
7.	"Better Off Without You" (with Shift K3Y)			3:18
8.	"Remember" (with David Guetta)			2:41
9.	"Perfect People"			3:03
10.	"My Heart Goes (La Di Da)" (with Topic)			2:28
11.	"Could Be My Somebody" (with S1mba)			3:15
12.	"Business" (with Ella Eyre)			3:17
13.	"Waiting Not Looking"			2:04
14.	"Distance"			2:55
15.	"Lessons" (with Banx & Ranx)			3:07
16.	"Heaven On My Mind" (with Sigala)			3:13
17.	"Is Anybody There"			3:16
18.	"Through the Night" (with 220 Kid)			2:48
Total length:				54:25

Digital Deluxe Disc 2 track listing
No.	Title	Writer(s)	Producer(s)	Length
1.	"Personally"	Sarah Aarons; Ajay Bhattacharrya; Hill	Stint	3:41
2.	"Here For You" (with Wilkinson)	Mark Wilkinson; Hill; Toby Le Messurier Scott	Wilkinson; Toby Le Messurier Scott	3:47
3.	"Hold On" (with Netsky)	Boris Daenen; Hill	Netsky	3:44
4.	"Remember" (Acoustic)	Hill	Aaron Williams	2:58
5.	"Space"	Hill; Josh Record; Mark Ralph; David Whelan; David Di Scala	Ralph; CamelPhat	3:18
Total length:				17:28

Notes

- ^{^[a]} indicates an additional producer
- ^{^[c]} indicates a co-producer
- ^{^[v]} indicates a vocal producer

== Personnel ==
Musicians

- Becky Hill – vocals (all tracks), background vocals (2)
- Ryan Ashley – background vocals (1, 2, 5–8, 11–14), vocal arrangement (13), vocal production (1, 2, 5–8, 11–14)
- Lostboy – drum programming, piano, synthesizer programming (2)
- Mark Ralph – keyboards, percussion, programming (2)
- Lucas Nord – programming (3)
- MK – programming (3)
- Jarly – keyboards (4, 13); bass, drums, guitar, piano, programming, sound effects, strings (4); drum programming (13)
- Svidden – bass, drums, guitar, keyboards, piano, programming, sound effects, strings (4)
- Luke Storrs – keyboards (5)
- MJ Cole – piano, programming (6, 11)
- Tobie Tripp – string arrangement (6, 11)
- Josh Wilkinson – bass, drums, keyboards, sound effects, strings, synthesizer (7)
- Tobias Topic – bass, percussion, synthesizer (7)
- Tom Hollings – bass programming, percussion (8)
- Sam Brennan – drum programming, synthesizer (8)
- S1mba – vocals (8)
- MNEK – background vocals, programming (9)
- Banx & Ranx – bass guitar, drums, programming, synthesizer (9, 12, 14); keyboards (12, 14)
- Ella Eyre – vocals (9)
- Clément Langlois-Légaré – guitar (12)
- Sigala – drum programming, keyboards (13)

Technical

- Stuart Hawkes – mastering engineer (1–4, 6–15)
- Peppe Folliero – mastering engineer (5)
- Serge Courtois – mixer (1, 10)
- Mark Ralph – mixer (2, 3, 5, 13, 15), recording arranger (3)
- Wez Clarke – mixer (4)
- MK – mixer (6, 11), engineer (3, 11), recording engineer (9)
- Topic – mixer (7)
- Ed Sokolowski – mixer (8)
- Mark Stent – mixer (9)
- Nikola Feve "Nk.F" – mixer (12, 14)
- Gemma Chester – engineer (2)
- Josh Green – engineer (2)
- Lucas Nord – engineer (3)
- Lewis Shay Jankel – engineer (4)
- Billen Ted – engineer (8)
- Oscar Hill – engineer (10)
- Ross Fortune – engineer (13)
- Tom AD Fuller – engineer (13)
- Ryan Ashley – vocal engineer (13)
- Ewan Vickery – assistant mixer (6, 11)

== Charts ==
=== Weekly charts ===
Weekly chart performance for Only Honest on the Weekend
Chart (2021–2022)	Peak position
Dutch Albums (Album Top 100)	99
Irish Albums (Official Charts)	5
Lithuanian Albums (AGATA)	77
Norwegian Albums (VG-lista)	18
Scottish Albums (Official Charts)	6
UK Albums (Official Charts)	7
US Top Dance Albums (Billboard)	4

=== Year-end charts ===
2022 year-end chart performance for Only Honest on the Weekend
Chart (2022)	Position
UK Albums (OCC)	27

2023 year-end chart performance for Only Honest on the Weekend
Chart (2023)	Position
UK Albums (OCC)	84

2024 year-end chart performance for Only Honest on the Weekend
Chart (2024)	Position
Australian Dance Albums (ARIA)	24

== Certifications ==
Certifications and sales for Only Honest on the Weekend
Region	Certification	Certified units/sales
New Zealand (RMNZ)	Platinum	15,000^{‡}
Poland (ZPAV)	Gold	10,000^{‡}
United Kingdom (BPI)	Platinum	300,000^{‡}
^{‡} Sales+streaming figures based on certification alone.
