= Every Cloud =

Every Cloud – Silver Linings

Studio album by Sigala
- Released: 3 March 2023
- Recorded: 2019–2022
- Length: 34:00
- Labels: Ministry of Sound; Columbia
- Producers: Sigala; TI Jakke; Tor Eimon; Joakim Jarly; David Guetta; Giacomo Uber; Gabry Ponte; Alex Gaudino; Neave Applebaum; Alok; OHYES; Andrew Wells

Sigala chronology
Brighter Days (2018)	Every Cloud – Silver Linings (2023)

Singles from Every Cloud – Silver Linings
- 1. "Wish You Well" Released: 24 May 2019; 2. "Heaven on My Mind" Released: 25 June 2020; 3. "Lasting Lover" Released: 4 September 2020; 4. "You for Me" Released: 2 July 2021; 5. "Melody" Released: 21 January 2022; 6. "Stay the Night" Released: 20 May 2022; 7. "Living Without You" Released: 2 September 2022; 8. "All by Myself" Released: 7 October 2022; 9. "Rely on Me" Released: 11 November 2022; 10. "Radio" Released: 6 January 2023; 11. "Feels This Good" Released: 3 March 2023

Every Cloud – Silver Linings is the second studio album by British producer and DJ Sigala, released on 3 March 2023 through Ministry of Sound along with the eleventh single, "Feels This Good". It was originally the first part (11 of 20 tracks) of the full album Every Cloud, which experienced multiple delays throughout 2022 and 2023 and had a final release date of 1 December 2023, before it was ultimately scrapped due to a track not getting sample clearance. All tracks from Silver Linings had been issued as singles by the time of its release. The album as released includes guest appearances from Talia Mar, David Guetta, Sam Ryder, Becky Hill, Gabry Ponte, Alex Gaudino, James Arthur, Rita Ora, Alok, Ellie Goulding, MNEK, Mae Muller, Caity Baser and Stefflon Don.

== Background and composition ==
After the success of his debut album Brighter Days in 2018, Sigala expressed an interest in working with Becky Hill after having a few ideas for new song that he felt suited her best. In an interview with The Nocturnal Times, he said, "Growing up I was massively into trance, from the likes of Tiesto and Armin van Buuren..." which in turn served as a huge inspiration for the track.

Three years prior to working with Becky, whilst writing songs for his debut album, Sigala revealed that he took people away with him to a songwriting camp out in Thailand, which included his production partner Jarly, The Invisible Men and Ida Martinsen Botten. Some songs written with The Invisible Men made the album, including "Just Got Paid" and "What You Waiting For", whilst the rest of the material was largely forgotten about. However, some of those were uprooted for his second album, which were "Heaven on My Mind", "Melody" and "Stay the Night".

In some cases, songs were also given to Sigala by other artists to work on, which was the case for "Lasting Lover". Sigala said that the song was originally presented to him as a stripped-back acoustic song, written by Scottish singer-songwriter Lewis Capaldi, before he made it into the song it is. "It was amazing.", Sigala elaborated, "It came to me as a ballad, just like an acoustic song with just guitar and his voice on it. I worked on it a bit and I got in touch with James from there just to see if he wanted to sing it. It's really cool to have him involved." Another song that was given to him was the album's succeeding single "You for Me", which started to contribute more solid tropical house vibes. The song, originally sung and written by Charli XCX,

Sigala worked with David Guetta and 2022 Eurovision runner-up Sam Ryder on the song "Living Without You" which was sonically reminiscent to his early hit singles. He opened up about how he managed to work with Sam almost before the events of Eurovision. He elaborated, "I was so lucky to work with Sam just before Eurovision sent him stratospheric and I've wanted to work with David Guetta for years, he's an absolute legend". The song was worked on by Sigala and Guetta and also given to the artists by Tom Grennan, who was the song's co-writer and was also writing for other artists like Westlife and Clean Bandit.

== Promotion and release ==
The album was announced for pre-order on 21 October 2022 and was made available for CD, vinyl and cassette formats. The track list also revealed that Sigala's previously released single "We Got Love", featuring Ella Henderson, did not make the final cut of the album. Sigala said on his social media, "I've worked so hard on this album and can't wait for it to be out." He also announced he would embark on a UK tour to promote the album in March 2023.

== Track listing ==
Every Cloud – Silver Linings track listing
No.	Title	Writer(s)	Producer(s)	Length
1.	"Feels This Good" (with Mae Muller and Caity Baser featuring Stefflon Don)	Fielder; Jarl; Hill; Ella McMahon; Natalie Dunn; Michael Harwood; Dennis White; Amie Miriello; Stephanie Allen	Sigala; Jarly	3:10
2.	"Stay the Night" (with Talia Mar)	Fielder; Jarl; Botten; George Astasio; Jason Pebworth; Jonathan Shave; Scott Wild	Sigala; Jarly	2:51
3.	"Radio" (with MNEK)	Fielder; Manovski; Max Martin; Joakim Jarl; Uzoechi Osisioma Emenike	Sigala; Jarly	3:15
4.	"Living Without You" (with David Guetta and Sam Ryder)	Fielder; Jarl; Tom Grennan; Eddie Serafica; Bennett; James Murray; Mustafa Omer	Sigala; Jarly; David Guetta	3:04
5.	"Melody"	Fielder; Manovski; Farrugia; Ida Martinsen Botten; Yusekae Koi; Jakob "TI" Erixon	Sigala; TI Jakke; Tor Eimon	2:47
6.	"Wish You Well" (with Becky Hill)	Fielder; Jarl; Maegan Cottone; Jenson Vaughan; Andreas Krüger; Rebecca Hill; Ryan Campbell	Sigala; Jarly^{[c]}	3:25
7.	"Lasting Lover" (with James Arthur)	Fielder; Jarl; Lewis Capaldi; Corey Sanders; Luke Fitton; James Arthur; Andrew VanWyngarden; Benjamin Goldwasser	Sigala; Jarly	3:38
8.	"All by Myself" (with Alok and Ellie Goulding)	Alok Petrillo; Sander van der Waal; Elena Goulding; Thomas Mann; Andrew Wells; Anthony Rossomando	Alok; OHYES; Sigala; Wells	2:51
9.	"You for Me" (with Rita Ora)	Fielder; Jarl; Charlotte Aitchison; Madison Love; Alexander Cook; Finn Keane; Rita Ora	Sigala; Jarly; Neave Applebaum	2:55
10.	"Rely on Me" (with Gabry Ponte and Alex Gaudino)	Fielder; Clementine Douglas; Timothy Powell; Giacomo Uber; Elvira Citro; Annerley Gordon; Daniela Galli; Paul Sears; Marco Sorcini; Alfredo Pignagnoli	Sigala; Uber; Gabry Ponte; Alex Gaudino	2:54
11.	"Heaven on My Mind" (with Becky Hill)	Fielder; Jarl; Botten; Astasio; Pebworth; Shave; Hill; Campbell; Emenike	Sigala; Jarly	3:13
Total length:				34:00

Notes

- ^{^[c]} signifies a co-producer.
- "Melody" features uncredited vocals from Ida Martinsen Botten.
- "Rely on Me" features uncredited vocals from Elvira Citro.
- "Rely on Me" samples the song "2 Times", as performed by Ann Lee and written by Annerley Gordon, Daniela Galli, Paul Sears, Marco Sorcini and Alfredo Pignagnoli.
- "Lasting Lover" samples the song "Time to Pretend", as performed by MGMT and written by Andrew VanWyngarden and Ben Goldwasser.

=== Cancelled release ===
The intended full version of Every Cloud was to have 20 tracks and a different running order, leaving nine that were ultimately not released (marked below with an asterisk). The track listing was as follows:

Every Cloud track listing
No.	Title	Writer(s)	Producer(s)	Length
1.	"Top 5*" (with S1mba)	Bruce Fielder; Steven Manovski; Shaun Farrugia; Janee Bennett		3:29
2.	"Melody"	Fielder; Manovski; Farrugia; Ida Martinsen Botten; Yusekae Koi; Jakob "TI" Erixon	Sigala; TI Jakke; Tor Eimon	2:47
3.	"Radio" (with MNEK)	Fielder; Joakim Jarl; Manovski; Uzoechi Osisioma Emenike	Sigala; Jarly	3:15
4.	"Stay the Night" (with Talia Mar)	Fielder; Jarl; Botten; George Astasio; Jason Pebworth; Jonathan Shave; Scott Wild	Sigala; Jarly	2:51
5.	"Living Without You" (with David Guetta and Sam Ryder)	Fielder; Jarl; Tom Grennan; Eddie Serafica; Bennett; James Murray; Mustafa Omer	Sigala; Jarly; David Guetta	3:04
6.	"Wish You Well" (with Becky Hill)	Fielder; Jarl; Maegan Cottone; Jenson Vaughan; Andreas Krüger; Rebecca Hill; Ryan Campbell	Sigala; Jarly^{[c]}	3:25
7.	"Rely on Me" (with Gabry Ponte and Alex Gaudino)	Fielder; Clementine Douglas; Timothy Powell; Giacomo Uber; Elvira Citro; Annerley Gordon; Daniela Galli; Paul Sears; Marco Sorcini; Alfredo Pignagnoli	Sigala; Uber; Gabry Ponte; Alex Gaudino	2:54
8.	"Just Look Up*" (with Gavin James)	Fielder; Manovski		3:46
9.	"Lasting Lover" (with James Arthur)	Fielder; Jarl; Lewis Capaldi; Corey Sanders; Luke Fitton; James Arthur; Andrew VanWyngarden; Benjamin Goldwasser	Sigala; Jarly	3:38
10.	"Deep Like That*" (with Harlee)	Fielder; Koi; Roxanne Emery		3:17
11.	"Mood for You*" (with Bryn Christopher)	Fielder; Jarl; Linnea Sodahl; Ryan Rabin		3:43
12.	"Feels This Good" (with Mae Muller and Caity Baser featuring Stefflon Don)	Fielder; Jarl; Hill; Ella McMahon; Natalie Dunn; Michael Harwood; Dennis White; Amie Miriello; Stephanie Allen	Sigala; Jarly	3:10
13.	"Passengers*" (with Au/Ra)	Fielder; Jarl; Sophie "Frances" Cooke; Cathy Dennis; Andrew Frampton		3:31
14.	"Ordinary Love*" (with Bow Anderson)	Fielder; Conran Williams-Lee; Rhett Williams-Lee; Ruth-Anne Cunningham; Mike Needle; Oliver Green		3:31
15.	"Somebody New*" (with A7S)	Fielder; Jarl		3:02
16.	"Not Over Us*"	Fielder; Manovski; Joshua Grimmett; Ethan Shore		3:14
17.	"Be Your Friend*" (with Ilira)	Fielder; Manovski; Cottone; Tye Morgan		3:12
18.	"You for Me" (with Rita Ora)	Fielder; Jarl; Charlotte Aitchison; Madison Love; Alexander Cook; Finn Keane; Rita Ora	Sigala; Jarly; Neave Applebaum	2:55
19.	"Heaven on My Mind" (with Becky Hill)	Fielder; Jarl; Botten; Astasio; Pebworth; Shave; Hill; Campbell; Emenike	Sigala; Jarly	3:13
20.	"All by Myself" (with Alok and Ellie Goulding)	Alok Petrillo; Sander van der Waal; Elena Goulding; Thomas Mann; Andrew Wells; Anthony Rossomando	Alok; OHYES; Sigala; Wells	2:51
Total length:				64:48

== Charts ==
Chart performance for Every Cloud – Silver Linings
Chart (2023)	Peak position
Irish Albums (Official Charts)	49
Lithuanian Albums (AGATA)	52
UK Albums (Official Charts)	64
UK Dance Albums (Official Charts)	1

== Certifications ==
Certifications for Every Cloud – Silver Linings
Region	Certification	Certified units/sales
Hungary (MAHASZ)	Gold	2,000^{‡}
Poland (ZPAV)	Platinum	20,000^{‡}
United Kingdom (BPI)	Silver	60,000^{‡}
^{‡} Sales+streaming figures based on certification alone.
