= New Age (KSI and Randolph album) =

Studio album by KSI and Randolph
- Released: 12 April 2019
- Recorded: 2017–2019
- Studio: Centre Point apartment
- Genres: British hip hop; grime
- Length: 32:08
- Label: Self-released
- Producers: The Citrus Clouds; KZift; Randolph; P2J; Sammy SoSo; Zagor; Zeeshan

KSI chronology
Disstracktions (2017)	New Age (2019)	Dissimulation (2020)

Randolph chronology
Resurrected: the Mixtape (2017)	New Age (2019)	Going Clear (2020)

Singles from New Age
- 1. "Slow Motion" Released: 20 April 2018; 2. "Beerus" Released: 14 December 2018; 3. "Red Alert" Released: 11 January 2019

New Age is a collaborative studio album by British YouTube personalities and rappers KSI and Randolph. It was released independently on 12 April 2019. The album features guest appearances from Talia Mar, Jme and Quadeca. The album charted at number 17 on the UK Albums Chart.

== Promotion and release ==
The album and a European tour to accompany it were both announced in February 2019 during KSI's YouTube video entitled "Big Announcement Incoming!!!".

In an interview about the album's title, KSI said that:

The album is called "New Age" because it's essentially a "New Age" of everything that we're doing. So it's a "New Age" of music, a "New Age" of entertainment. We as independent artists, are showing people that we are more than what people portray us and that's what this album encapsulates.

On the day of the release of the album, KSI tweeted that the whole album was copyright free:

If you wanna use our music in your YouTube videos or anything else then go ahead. We ain't on that copyright bullshit or that claiming bullshit. We out here letting everybody eat good. This is a NEW AGE. We're fully independent so we make the rules.

=== Tour ===
List of concerts, showing date, city, country, venue, opening acts
Date	City	Country	Venue	Opening act(s)
Leg 1 – Europe (2019)
17 May 2019	Bournemouth	England	O2 Academy Bournemouth	—N/a
19 May 2019	Cardiff	Wales	Tramshed	—N/a
23 May 2019	Birmingham	England	O2 Institute Birmingham	—N/a
24 May 2019	Liverpool	England	O2 Academy Liverpool	—N/a
29 May 2019	Glasgow	Scotland	TV Studio	—N/a
30 May 2019	Newcastle	England	The Venue	—N/a
31 May 2019	Sheffield	England	The Plug	—N/a
5 June 2019	Manchester	England	Manchester Academy 2	—N/a
20 June 2019	London	England	Electric Brixton	—N/a
21 June 2019	Nottingham	England	Rock City	—N/a
23 June 2019	Dublin	Ireland	Vicar Street	—N/a
26 June 2019	Stockholm	Sweden	Klubben	—N/a
27 June 2019	Oslo	Norway	Sentrum Scene	—N/a
28 June 2019	Copenhagen	Denmark	Vega	—N/a
30 June 2019	Amsterdam	Netherlands	Melkweg	—N/a
5 July 2019	Antwerp	Belgium	Zappa	—N/a
7 July 2019	Berlin	Germany	Musik & Frieden	—N/a

== Singles ==
"Slow Motion" was released on 20 April 2018 alongside a music video. A remastered version of the song appears on the album.

The album's second single, "Beerus", was released on 14 December 2018 alongside a music video, which has 22 million views. The title of the song pays homage to the fictional character Beerus from the Dragon Ball series. The song was released amid a period of controversy, mainly due to KSI and his brother Deji having a public altercation due to Deji's back and forth dispute with Randolph, which was sparked by Randolph referring to Deji's channel as "dead" in a Sidemen YouTube video. Days before the release of "Beerus", Deji had released a series of videos and a diss track entitled "Unforgivable", all directed towards KSI. This caused fans to perceive "Beerus" as a direct response to Deji's videos and diss track upon its release. However, this would not be the case, as KSI would later go on to clear the confusion surrounding the song, stating that it isn't a diss track directed towards his brother.

The album's third single, "Red Alert", was released on 11 January 2019. A music video for "Red Alert" was released on 6 April 2019, and it has 6 million views.

=== Other songs ===
A music video for "Pull Up", featuring British grime MC Jme, was released on 4 May 2019, and it has 15.61 million views.

A music video for "Real Name", featuring British singer Talia Mar, was released on 18 June 2019, and it has 4.8 million views.

== Commercial performance ==
The album debuted at number 17 on the UK Albums Chart and number 1 on the UK R&B Albums Chart. The album also charted at number 75 on the Dutch Albums Top 100 Chart and number 26 on the Norwegian Albums Chart.

== Track listing ==
Credits adapted from Tidal and Twitter.

All tracks performed by KSI and Randolph, except "Pull Up", performed by KSI and Jme, and "Roll the Dice", performed by Randolph and Quadeca.

No.	Title	Writer(s)	Producer(s)	Length
1.	"New Age"	Olajide Olatunji; Andrew Shane	Zagor	2:36
2.	"Beerus"	Olatunji; Shane	Zeeshan	3:31
3.	"Champagne"	Olatunji; Shane	Zeeshan	3:33
4.	"Clean"	Olatunji; Shane	Zeeshan; KZift	3:24
5.	"Real Name" (featuring Talia Mar)	Olatunji; Shane; Natalia Haddock	The Citrus Clouds	2:57
6.	"Slow Motion (Remastered)"	Olatunji; Shane	Zeeshan	3:49
7.	"Red Alert"	Olatunji; Shane	Zeeshan	3:15
8.	"Bow Down"	Olatunji; Shane	Randolph	3:18
9.	"Pull Up" (performed by KSI featuring Jme)	Olatunji; Jamie Adenuga	P2J, Sammy SoSo	3:04
10.	"Roll the Dice" (performed by Randolph featuring Quadeca)	Shane; Benjamin Lasky	Zeeshan	2:43
Total length:				32:10

== Personnel ==
Credits adapted from Tidal and Twitter.

- KSI – vocals, songwriter (tracks 1–9)
- Randolph – vocals, songwriter (tracks 1–8, 10), producer (track 8)
- Zagor – producer (track 1)
- Zeeshan – producer (tracks 2–4, 6, 7, 10)
- KZift – producer (track 4)
- Talia Mar – vocals, songwriter (track 5)
- The Citrus Clouds – producer (track 5)
- Jme – vocals, songwriter (track 9)
- P2J – producer (track 9)
- Sammy SoSo – producer (track 9)
- Quadeca – vocals, songwriter (track 10)

== Charts ==
Chart (2019)	Peak position
Dutch Albums (Album Top 100)	75
Estonian Albums (Eesti Tipp-40)	7
Irish Albums (IRMA)	29
Latvian Albums (LAIPA)	19
Lithuanian Albums (AGATA)	24
Norwegian Albums (VG-lista)	26
Scottish Albums (Official Charts)	40
UK Albums (Official Charts)	17
UK Independent Albums (Official Charts)	10
UK R&B Albums (Official Charts)	1

== Release history ==
Region	Date	Format(s)	Label	Ref.
Various	12 April 2019	Digital download; streaming	Self-released	

== See also ==
- 2019 in hip hop music
- List of UK R&B Albums Chart number ones of 2019
