= Run (Becky Hill and Galantis song) =

2022 song by Becky Hill and Galantis

Single by Becky Hill and Galantis

from the album Only Honest on the Weekend (Deluxe)
- Released: 25 February 2022
- Length: 3:08
- Label: Polydor; Eko
- Songwriters: Becky Hill; Christian Karlsson; Uzoechi Emenike; Christopher Tempest; David Saint Fleur; Jordi de Fluiter; Y3llo Koala
- Producers: Becky Hill; Bloodshy; Y3llo Koala; David Saint Fleur; Vodka; Mr. Whistler

Becky Hill singles chronology
"My Heart Goes (La Di Da)" (2021)	"Run" (2022)	"Crazy What Love Can Do" (2022)

Galantis singles chronology
"When the Lights Go Down" (2022)	"Run" (2022)	"Good Luck" (2022)

Music video
- "Run" on YouTube

"Run" is a song by English singer Becky Hill and Swedish production duo Galantis. The song was released on 25 February 2022 by record labels Polydor Records and Eko Records. The song was also featured on the deluxe version of Hill's debut album, Only Honest on the Weekend (2021).

== Commercial performance ==
"Run" entered the UK Singles Charts at number 34 on 10 March 2022 (week ending), before peaking at number 21 in its sixth week on the charts. The song became Hill's 14th and Galantis' seventh top 40 single. "Run" additionally entered the top 40 in Ireland and the top 20 of the Billboard Dance/Electronic Songs chart at number 17.

== Charts ==
=== Weekly charts ===
Weekly chart performance for "Run"
Chart (2022)	Peak position
Belgium (Ultratop 50 Flanders)	45
Czech Republic Airplay (ČNS IFPI)	1
Ireland (IRMA)	36
Netherlands (Single Top 100)	92
UK Dance (OCC)	7
UK Singles (OCC)	21
US Hot Dance/Electronic Songs (Billboard)	17

=== Year-end charts ===
Year-end chart performance for "Run"
Chart (2022)	Position
Belgium (Ultratop 50 Flanders)	135
US Hot Dance/Electronic Songs (Billboard)	92

== Certifications ==
Certifications for "Run"
Region	Certification	Certified units/sales
United Kingdom (BPI)	Gold	400,000^{‡}
^{‡} Sales+streaming figures based on certification alone.
