= My Heart Goes (La Di Da) =

2021 single by Becky Hill and Topic

- Jess Bays remix cover

Single by Becky Hill and Topic

from the album Only Honest on the Weekend
- Released: 24 August 2021
- Genre: EDM, dance-pop
- Length: 2:28
- Label: Polydor
- Songwriter(s): Becky Hill; Charlotte Jane Haining; Frank Nobel; Josh Wilkinson; Linus Nordström; Jack Patterson
- Producer(s): Becky Hill; Topic; Josh Wilkinson

Becky Hill singles chronology
"Remember" (2021)	"My Heart Goes (La Di Da)" (2021)	"Run" (2022)

Topic singles chronology
"Drive" (2021)	"My Heart Goes (La Di Da)" (2021)	"Ich bin weg (Boro boro)" (2021)

Music video
- "My Heart Goes (La Di Da)" on YouTube

"My Heart Goes (La Di Da)" is a song by British singer-songwriter Becky Hill and German DJ Topic. It was released on 24 August 2021 as the fifth single from Hill's debut studio album Only Honest on the Weekend. The song peaked at number 11 on the UK Singles Chart where it spent four consecutive weeks and became the album's fourth top-20 hit.

== Track listings ==
Digital download and streaming
No.	Title	Length
1.	"My Heart Goes (La Di Da)"	2:28

Digital download and streaming – Jess Bays remix
No.	Title	Length
1.	"My Heart Goes (La Di Da)" (Jess Bays remix)	2:30

Digital download and streaming – Topic VIP remix
No.	Title	Length
1.	"My Heart Goes (La Di Da)" (Topic VIP remix)	4:15

== Credits and personnel ==
Credits adapted from Tidal.

- Josh Wilkinson – producer, composer, lyricist, associated performer, bass, drums, keyboards, sound effect, strings, synthesizer
- Topic – producer, composer, lyricist, associated performer, bass, mixer, music production, percussion, studio personal, synthesizer
- Charlotte Jane Haining – composer, lyricist
- Frank Nobel – composer, lyricist
- Linus Nordström – composer, lyricist
- Becky Hill – composer, lyricist, associated performer, vocals
- Stuart Hawkes – mastering engineer, studio personnel

== Charts ==
=== Weekly charts ===
Weekly chart performance for "My Heart Goes (La Di Da)"
Chart (2021–2023)	Peak position
Australia (ARIA)	100
Belarus Airplay (TopHit)	162
Bulgaria International (PROPHON)	6
CIS Airplay (TopHit)	45
Czech Republic (Rádio – Top 100)	11
Czech Republic (Singles Digitál Top 100)	65
Germany (GfK)	87
Ireland (IRMA)	6
Lithuania (AGATA)	79
Lithuania Airplay (TopHit)	156
Moldova Airplay (TopHit)	53
Poland (Polish Airplay Top 100)	1
Romania (UPFR)	4
Slovakia (Rádio Top 100)	25
UK Singles (OCC)	11
UK Dance (OCC)	1
US Hot Dance/Electronic Songs (Billboard)	23

=== Monthly charts ===
Monthly chart performance for "My Heart Goes (La Di Da)"
Chart (2022–2023)	Peak position
CIS Airplay (TopHit)	50
Moldova Airplay (TopHit)	64

=== Year-end charts ===
2022 year-end chart performance for "My Heart Goes (La Di Da)"
Chart (2022)	Position
CIS Airplay (TopHit)	161
UK Singles (OCC)	95

2023 year-end chart performance for "My Heart Goes (La Di Da)"
Chart (2023)	Position
Moldova Airplay (TopHit)	190

== Certifications ==
Certifications for "My Heart Goes (La Di Da)"
Region	Certification	Certified units/sales
Australia (ARIA)	2× Platinum	140,000^{‡}
Brazil (Pro-Música Brasil)	Platinum	40,000^{‡}
Canada (Music Canada)	Gold	40,000^{‡}
Italy (FIMI)	Gold	50,000^{‡}
New Zealand (RMNZ)	Gold	15,000^{‡}
Poland (ZPAV)	Platinum	50,000^{‡}
Portugal (AFP)	Gold	5,000^{‡}
Spain (PROMUSICAE)	Gold	30,000^{‡}
United Kingdom (BPI)	Platinum	600,000^{‡}
Streaming
Sweden (GLF)	Gold	4,000,000^{†}
^{‡} Sales+streaming figures based on certification alone.^{†} Streaming-only figures based on certification alone.
