= You for Me (song) =

Single by Sigala and Rita Ora

from the album Every Cloud – Silver Linings
- Released: 2 July 2021
- Recorded: March 2021
- Genre: Dance-pop
- Length: 2:55
- Label: Ministry of Sound; B1
- Songwriters: Alexander Cook; Charlotte Emma Aitchison; Madison Love; Finn Keane; Rita Ora; Bruce Fielder; Joakim Jarl
- Producers: Sigala; Jarly; Neave Applebaum

Sigala singles chronology
| "Lasting Lover" (2020) | "You for Me" (2021) | "Runaway" (2021) |

Rita Ora singles chronology
| "Big" (2021) | "You for Me" (2021) | "Follow Me" (2021) |

Music video
- "You for Me" on YouTube

"You for Me" is a song by English DJ and record producer Sigala and British singer Rita Ora. It was released on 2 July 2021 through Ministry of Sound and B1 Recordings.

== Composition ==
The song was written by Sigala and Rita Ora with A. G. Cook, Joakim Jarl, Charli XCX, Madison Love and Finn Keane.

== Music video ==
The music video for the song, directed by Clara Cullen, was released on July 16, 2021 through Sigala's YouTube channel.

== Credits and personnel ==
- Sigala – composition, production
- Rita Ora – vocals, composition
- Alexander Cook – composition
- Charlotte Emma Aitchison – composition
- Finn Keane – composition
- Joakim Jarl – composition
- Madison Love – composition
- Jarly – production
- Neave Applebaum – production
- Dave Kutch – master engineering
- Mark Ralph – mix engineering
- Liam Quinn – recording engineering, vocal engineering
- Dipesh Parmar – editing, performance arrangement
- Cameron Gower Poole – vocal production
- Milly McGregor – violin

== Charts ==
=== Weekly charts ===
Weekly chart performance for "You for Me"
| Chart (2021) | Peak position |
|---|---|
| Croatia (HRT) | 27 |
| Czech Republic Airplay (ČNS IFPI) | 27 |
| Ireland (IRMA) | 23 |
| New Zealand Hot Singles (RMNZ) | 13 |
| Poland Airplay (ZPAV) | 20 |
| Sweden Heatseeker (Sverigetopplistan) | 4 |
| UK Singles (Official Charts) | 23 |
| UK Dance (Official Charts) | 8 |
| US Hot Dance/Electronic Songs (Billboard) | 17 |

=== Year-end charts ===
Year-end chart performance for "You for Me"
| Chart (2021) | Position |
|---|---|
| Croatia (ARC Top 100) | 92 |
| US Hot Dance/Electronic Songs (Billboard) | 60 |

== Certifications ==
Certifications for "You for Me"
| Region | Certification | Certified units/sales |
|---|---|---|
| Canada (Music Canada) | Gold | 40,000^{‡} |
| United Kingdom (BPI) | Gold | 400,000^{‡} |
^{‡} Sales+streaming figures based on certification alone.

== Release date ==
| Region | Date | Format | Label | Ref. |
|---|---|---|---|---|
| Various | 2 July 2021 | Digital download; streaming | Sony | |
| Italy | 16 July 2021 | Radio airplay | Sony | |
