= Space (Becky Hill song) =

Single by Becky Hill

from the album Only Honest on the Weekend (Deluxe)
- Released: 2 October 2020
- Length: 3:18
- Label: Eko; Polydor
- Songwriters: Rebecca Hill; Josh Record; Mark Ralph; David Whelan; Michael Di Scala
- Producers: Ralph; CamelPhat

Becky Hill singles chronology
"Heaven on My Mind" (2020)	"Space" (2020)	"Forever Young" (2020)

"Space" is a song by English singer Becky Hill. The track was released by labels Polydor Records and Eko Records on 2 October 2020. The song was written by Hill herself, alongside Josh Record, Mark Ralph, and both members of CamelPhat and produced by the latter two. The song peaked at number seventy-nine on the UK Singles Chart. Her debut studio album, Only Honest on the Weekend, is derived from a lyric in this song which was ultimately cut out from the final tracklist, but was later included in the deluxe version of the album.

== Music video ==
A music video to accompany the release of "Space" was first released onto YouTube on 2 October 2020.

== Track listing ==
Digital download
No.	Title	Length
1.	"Space"	3:18

Digital download
No.	Title	Length
1.	"Space" (Solardo Remix)	4:43

Digital download
No.	Title	Length
1.	"Space" (Acoustic)	3:21

== Personnel ==
Credits adapted from Tidal.

- David Whelan – Producer, composer, lyricist, associated performer, music production, programming
- Mark Ralph – Producer, composer, lyricist, associated performer, music production, programming
- Michael Di Scala – Producer, composer, lyricist, associated performer, music production, programming
- Josh Record – Composer, lyricist
- Rebecca Claire Hill – Composer, lyricist, associated performer, vocals
- Matt Wolach – Assistant Mixer, studio personnel
- Ryan Ashley – Associated Performer, vocal producer
- Chris Gehringer – Mastering Engineer, studio personnel
- Mark "Spike" Stent – Mixer, studio personnel

== Charts ==
Chart (2020–2021)	Peak position
Czech Republic Airplay (ČNS IFPI)	21
Hungary (Rádiós Top 40)	38
Scotland Singles (OCC)	30
UK Singles (OCC)	79

== Release history ==
Region	Date	Format	Label
United Kingdom	2 October 2020	Digital download; streaming	Eko; Polydor
