= Talia Mar =

English singer and YouTuber (born 1986)

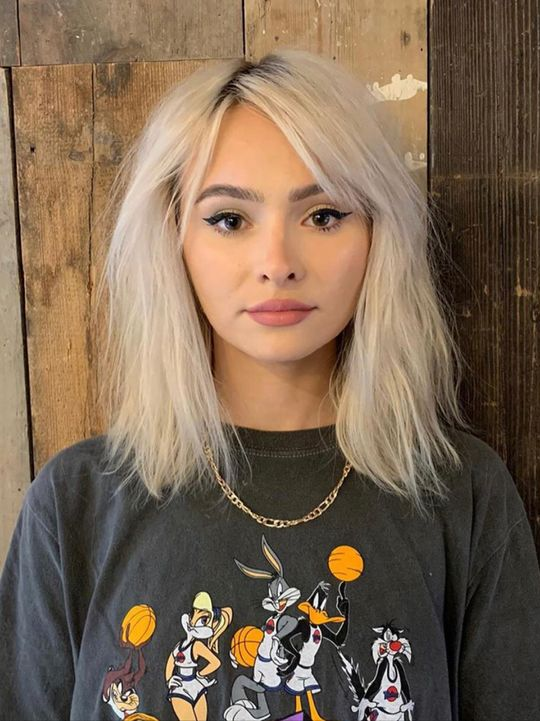
- Mar in 2019
- Born: Natalia Margaret Louise Haddock; 6 November 1996 (age 30); South London, England
- Education: BRIT School
- Occupations: Singer; Twitch streamer; YouTuber
- Years active: 2010–present
- Spouse: Simon Minter (m. 2023)
- Children: 1

Twitch information
- Channel: taliamar
- Years active: 2017–present
- Genres: reaction; gaming
- Followers: 794 thousand

YouTube information
- Channel: TaliaMarMusic
- Years active: 2010–present
- Genres: Music; vlog
- Subscribers: 1 million
- Views: 121.33 million
- Musical career
- Genres: Pop; dance
- Label: Independent
- Website: taliamar.com
- Last updated: 23 July 2025

Natalia Margaret Louise Mar (née Haddock; born 6 November 1996) is an English singer and Internet personality. Her collaboration with Sigala on "Stay the Night" charted at number eleven on the UK singles chart.

== Early life ==
Natalia Margaret Louise Haddock was born on 6 November 1996 in South London, England. She is of Italian descent on her mother's side, while her father is of English descent. Mar was brought up in a musical family; her father was a drummer at school, her mother can sing, and her sister is a pianist. She started writing songs and poems when she was eight years old and later started learning guitar on her own at the age of 11. She later began producing her own songs at the age of 14. Mar grew up listening to a lot of 90s music and R&B, such as Lauryn Hill, Brandy and Monica, and Taylor Swift, who she cited as her icon.

She was educated at the BRIT School. Before being a singer and an influencer, she previously worked at Chessington World of Adventures as a bartender and worked at a makeup stand for Smashbox. She also previously worked as a freelance makeup artist.

== Music career ==
=== 2016–2021: Early career and Tough Decisions ===
In June 2016, Mar released her debut single "Stolen". In March 2017, Mar released "In the Day". That same month, Mar released a YouTube performing a song title "The Voices Are Me" after she struggled to discuss her own battle with the taboo subject following a friend's suicide. In June, Mar released her debut EP title Tough Decisions.

In April 2019, Mar featured on the track "Real Name" on the collaborative album New Age from KSI and Randolph which peaked at number nineteen on the UK Independent Singles and Albums Charts. In June 2019, Mar released "Selfish", in July she released "Better", and in October she released "Diamonds". In February 2020, Mar featured vocals on the song "Survive the Night" by her then-boyfriend Miniminter and Randy. In January 2021, Mar released "Jack". Later that year, Mar released "Good On You", which was a collaboration with English DJ Alex Hobson. On 10 August 2021, Mar announced that she had signed with RCA Records and Sony Music Entertainment.

=== 2022–present: Mainstream successes ===
In May 2022, Mar released "Stay the Night" with Sigala. The song peaked at number eleven on the UK singles chart and twenty two on the Irish Singles Chart. In October, Mar released "Sweet Lies" with Nathan Dawe. The song peaked at number sixty one on the UK Singles Chart.

In March 2023, Mar released "Self-Portrait". In August, Mar released "Forget About Your Ex". In November, Mar toured with Caity Baser on her Still Learning Tour as the opening act. In May 2024, Mar announced the release of her single "A Bitch Always Knows" scheduled for 7 June, with pre-saves starting 17 May. However, her label decided not to proceed with the release, prompting Mar to part ways with them. In October 2026, she released her long-awaited EP "Not Worth the Wait" and performed at her first headline show in KOKO, Camden Town.

== Influencer career ==
Mar created her main YouTube channel, "Talia Mar", in December 2010. Mar's influencer career started after her first makeup photo that she tweeted went viral, which in turn helped her gain an audience and later was part of the reason for her to start uploading makeup tutorial content on YouTube. Mar created her Twitch channel, "TaliaMar", in May 2017. At the start of her Twitch career, she mostly streamed gaming content such as Dead by Daylight and Just Chatting content. In the same month, she created her second YouTube channel, "Talia Mar+", and mostly uploaded gaming and livestream highlights from her Twitch streams.

In 2019, Mar collaborated with OFRA Cosmetics to release two highlighters and a skincare line called OFRA x Talia Mar. In 2020, she was nominated for Breakout YouTuber at the 12th Shorty Awards. On 20 October 2022, Mar announced she had become an ambassador for British clothing brand PrettyLittleThing. In December 2022, Mar partnered with Yves Saint Laurent Opium to promote its Black Opium Extreme fragrance.

In April 2023, Mar was featured in a weekly gaming stream event held by Ministry of Sound and cosmetics retailer Lush called Beyond the Player. In April 2024, it was announced that Mar had signed with the UK agency YMU as part of its influencer roster. In December 2024, Mar participated in Jingle Jam, a livestreamed charity event held by Yogscast where 1000 streamers and content creators joined forces to raise cash for eight charities.

== Other ventures ==
=== Business ventures ===
On 15 May 2018, Mar launched The Martian Club, her online clothing retailer. On 21 October 2024, Mar joined her mother and sister's jewellery brand, L’ERA Jewellery, as Creative Director, adding her own creative style to the family-run brand known for its modern, meaningful designs and Italian roots.

=== Television appearances ===
On 10 December 2018, Mar announced across social media that she joined the panelists of the British television series All Together Now's second series alongside Geri Halliwell. In October 2023, she appeared in series 31, episode 7 of Never Mind the Buzzcocks, a British comedy panel game show with a pop music theme. In December 2023, she appeared in CBeebies Bedtime Story, a short-form series on CBeebies where celebrities read different stories, where she reads "Princesses Break Free" by Timothy Knapman and illustrated by Jenny Løvlie.

In January 2024, Mar appeared as a celebrity judge for CBBC new show called Style It Out, a clothing and fashion contest for young fashion designers. In April 2024, Mar appeared as a guest judge for Glow Up: Britain's Next Make-Up Star series 6, a British reality television competition on BBC Three devised to find new makeup artists.

== Personal life ==
Mar has been in a relationship with Sidemen member Simon Minter (also known as Miniminter) since 2017, but their relationship was not public until early 2018. They moved in together in February 2022. On 24 June 2022, it was announced the couple were engaged via Instagram, and they got married on 3 June 2023 in Italy. On 24 January 2025 via the music video for her song "365", it was announced the couple were expecting their first child. It was announced on 31 January via Minter's video that the couple were expecting a girl. On 19 July 2025, the couple's daughter, named Juni Angèle Minter-Mar, was born.

Mar has stated that she has hay fever, asthma and eczema. In 2024, she disclosed that she was diagnosed with autism around three years prior.

== Discography ==
=== Extended plays ===
Title	Details
Tough Decisions	Released: 30 June 2017; Label: Self-released; Format: Digital download, streaming
Not Worth The Wait	Released: 2 October 2026; Label: Self-released; Format: Digital download, streaming

=== Singles ===
==== As lead artist ====
List of singles as a lead artist, with selected chart positions, showing year released and album name
Title	Year	Peak chart positions		Certifications	Albums
Title	Year	UK	IRE	Certifications	Albums
"Stolen"	2016	—	—		Non-album singles
"In The Day"	2017	—	—		Non-album singles
"Selfish"	2019	—	—		Non-album singles
"Better"	2019	—	—		Non-album singles
"Diamonds"	2019	—	—		Non-album singles
"Jack"	2021	—	—		Non-album singles
"Good On You" (with Alex Hobson)	2021	—	—		Non-album singles
"Stay the Night" (with Sigala)	2022	11	22	BPI: Platinum	Every Cloud – Silver Linings
"Sweet Lies" (with Nathan Dawe)	2022	61	—		If Heaven Had a Phone Line
"Self-Portrait"	2023	—	—		Non-album singles
"Forget About Your Ex"	2023	—	—		Non-album singles
"Bored"	2023	—	—		Non-album singles
"365"	2025	—	—		Non-album singles
"Enemy."	2025	—	—		Non-album singles
"Letter to an idiot..."	2025	—	—		Non-album singles
"Suit & Tie"	2026	—	—		Non-album singles
"Lady"	2026	—	—		Non-album singles
"A Bitch Always Knows"	2026	—	—		Not Worth The Wait
"Psycho on a Couch"	2026	—	—		Not Worth The Wait
"—" denotes a single that did not chart or was not released in that territory.

==== As featured artist ====
List of singles as a featured artist, showing year released and album name
Title	Year	Album
"Get Back" (Rio Young featuring Talia Mar)	2018	Non-album single

=== Other charted songs ===
List of other charted songs, with selected chart positions and album name
Title	Year	Peak chart positions		Album
Title	Year	UK Indie	NZ Hot	Album
"Real Name" (KSI with Randolph featuring Talia Mar)	2019	19	38	New Age

=== Guest appearances ===
List of non-single guest appearances, with other performing artists
Title	Year	Other artist(s)	Album
"Noob" (Note: Mar is uncredited as an artist but holds writer credits and sings the chorus)	2017	KSI	Disstracktions
"Real Name"	2019	KSI, Randolph	New Age
"Survive the Night" (Note: Mar is credited in the music video, but uncredited in the standard release.)	2020	Miniminter, Randy	Non-album single

=== Music videos ===
List of music videos as lead and featured artist, showing directors
Title	Year	Director(s)	Ref.
As lead artist
"Stolen"	2016	JJMckellar	
"Better"	2019	RvbberDuck	
"Stay The Night" (with Sigala)	2022	Unknown	
"Sweet Lies" (with Nathan Dawe)	2022	Troy Roscoe	
"Self-Portrait"	2023	Kassandra Powell	
"Forget About Your Ex"	2023	RebekahBCreative	
"Bored"	2023	Samuel Douek	
"365"	2025	Unknown	
"Enemy."	2025	Kassandra Powell	
"Letter to an idiot..."	2025	Herself	
"Suit & Tie"	2026	Herself and Gee Nelson	
"Lady"	2026	Herself	
"A Bitch Always Knows"	2026	Herself	
As featured artist
"Get Back" (Rio Young featuring Talia Mar)	2018	Paul Akinrinlola	
"Real Name" (KSI with Randolph featuring Talia Mar)	2019	RvbberDuck	
"Survive the Night" (Miniminter with Randy featuring Talia Mar)	2020	Finn Hitchcock	

== Filmography ==
Television
Year	Title	Role	Network	Notes	Ref.
2019	All Together Now	Judge	BBC One	Series 2, Episode 1	
2023	Never Mind the Buzzcocks	Guest	Sky Max	Series 31, Episode 7	
2023	CBeebies Bedtime Stories	Guest	CBeebies	Episode: Princesses Break Free	
2024	Style It Out	Judge	CBBC	Series 1, Episode 8	
2024	Glow Up: Britain's Next Make-Up Star	Judge	BBC Three	Series 6, Episode 5	

== Tours ==
Opening

- Still Learning 2024 Tour – Caity Baser (2024)

Headling

- Talia Mar Live 2026

== Awards and nominations ==
Ceremony	Year	Category	Result	Ref.
Shorty Awards	2020	Breakout YouTuber	Nominated	

== See also ==
- List of YouTubers
