= Rover (S1mba song) =

2020 single by S1mba

Single by S1mba featuring DTG

from the album Good Time Long Time
- Released: 15 November 2019
- Studio: RAX Studio’s
- Genre: Afroswing, Hip-hop
- Length: 2:46
- Label: Rax; Parlophone
- Songwriters: Leonard Rwodzi; Ayodeji Araoye; Tyler Hotston
- Producers: Relyt & S1MBA

S1mba singles chronology
| "24/7" (2019) | "Rover" (2019) | "Loose" (2020) |

Music video
- "Rover" on YouTube

"Rover", also known as "Rover (Mu la la)", is a song by British rapper S1mba featuring British rapper DTG and produced by UK producer Relyt. The original single was released independently in November 2019 under Rax Productions, which S1mba is signed to. Rax Productions was founded by S1mba and manager Rapheal Adekunle. The song went viral on video-sharing app TikTok and was then re-released on the Rax Collective and the Parlophone (Warner) label in March 2020. Since then it achieved a UK BPI certified 2× Platinum status with over 1,200,000 units. The song charted and achieved certifications in many countries, including Australia, New Zealand, Greece, the Netherlands, Sweden, Denmark, and Ireland. At the 41st Brit Awards, the song received a nomination for Song of the Year, marking the first nomination for both artists.

== Composition ==
. S1mba explained the song portrays how life is, nobody wants to know when you are on the come up, nobody wants to know or take you in. However, as soon as you make it or do well for yourself, (in his case pulling up in a rover) people start to now notice you or show interest. It took a Range Rover for people to want to know more about him, but he is only focused on making more money as the lyrics state. Croydon YouTuber DTG has his own verse, with similar sentiments, as he says "I ain't got time for a honey", but has plenty of "time for this money".

== Commercial performance ==
The song went viral on TikTok for the #mulachallenge that S1mba announced, associated with various dance moves and hand moves. The song climbed up the UK charts, reaching number three on the UK Singles Chart for the week ending 28 May 2020.

== Charts ==
=== Weekly charts ===
Weekly chart performance for "Rover"
| Chart (2020–2022) | Peak position |
|---|---|
| Australia (ARIA) | 7 |
| Belgium (Ultratip Bubbling Under Flanders) | 2 |
| Belgium (Ultratip Bubbling Under Wallonia) | 14 |
| Denmark (Tracklisten) | 6 |
| France (SNEP) | 150 |
| Greece (IFPI) | 85 |
| Ireland (IRMA) | 3 |
| Netherlands (Dutch Top 40) | 33 |
| Netherlands (Single Top 100) | 14 |
| New Zealand (Recorded Music NZ) | 8 |
| Portugal (AFP) | 99 |
| Scottish Singles Sales (Official Charts) | 45 |
| Sweden (Sverigetopplistan) | 24 |
| Switzerland (Schweizer Hitparade) | 80 |
| UK Singles (Official Charts) | 3 |

=== Year-end charts ===
2020 year-end chart performance for "Rover"
| Chart (2020) | Position |
|---|---|
| Australia (ARIA) | 45 |
| Denmark (Tracklisten) | 49 |
| Ireland (IRMA) | 26 |
| Netherlands (Single Top 100) | 43 |
| New Zealand (Recorded Music NZ) | 33 |
| UK Singles (OCC) | 18 |

== Certifications ==
Certifications for "Rover"
| Region | Certification | Certified units/sales |
|---|---|---|
| Australia (ARIA) | Platinum | 70,000^{‡} |
| Canada (Music Canada) | Gold | 40,000^{‡} |
| Denmark (IFPI Danmark) | Platinum | 90,000^{‡} |
| France (SNEP) | Platinum | 200,000^{‡} |
| New Zealand (RMNZ) | 3× Platinum | 90,000^{‡} |
| Portugal (AFP) | Platinum | 10,000^{‡} |
| United Kingdom (BPI) | 2× Platinum | 1,200,000^{‡} |
^{‡} Sales+streaming figures based on certification alone.
