= It'll All Make Sense in the End =

Studio album by James Arthur
- Released: 5 November 2021
- Length: 48:50
- Label: Columbia

James Arthur chronology
You (2019)	It'll All Make Sense in the End (2021)	Bitter Sweet Love (2024)

Singles from It'll All Make Sense in the End
- 1. "Medicine" Released: 5 March 2021; 2. "September" Released: 11 June 2021; 3. "Avalanche" Released: 13 August 2021; 4. "Emily" Released: 24 September 2021; 5. "SOS" Released: 23 October 2021

Singles from It'll All Make Sense in the End (Deluxe)
- 1. "Lose My Mind" Released: 25 February 2022

It'll All Make Sense in the End is the fourth studio album by English singer-songwriter James Arthur, released on 5 November 2021 through Columbia Records. It was preceded by the singles "Medicine" and "September", and was initially set for release on 8 October.

A deluxe edition with six new tracks was released in 11 March 2022.

== Background and recording ==
After a period of self-reflection during the COVID-19 lockdowns in 2020, Arthur was inspired to begin work on new material and set up a home studio. Before beginning work, he knew he "wanted to make a record that was guitar-driven. [...] I knew that I wanted to make a coherent album, one that felt like a body of work that was all made in the same place." After working on several songs, he realised that he was writing about experiences that he had "never really addressed or spoken about before" and was motivated to complete a full body of work.

Arthur emphasised the difference in energy as compared to his previous work, calling his vocals "so intense on the record, and it made sense to match that intensity with heavy guitars and the trap drums". Although his label was initially unsure about the loudness of the guitars in the mix for an otherwise pop record, Arthur felt that when he had previously "dilute[d] the rock elements", he "lost" himself and wanted them to be more prominent on the album. The BBC also called it a "grittier, guitar-driven sound" as compared to Arthur's first three albums.

Arthur titled the record It'll All Make Sense in the End because "it's what I'd say to my younger self", which also inspired the cover art, which is meant to depict a "post-apocalyptic world where absolutely nothing makes sense". Explaining the "it" in the title, he declared "'it' is anything one would like it to be. Who knows? Just who knows? I guess the message is not to worry about it – not to try and control the outcome."

== Critical reception ==
Professional ratings
Review scores
Source	Rating
i	2/5 stars
GSGM	4/5
OutLoud! Culture	5/5 stars
Riff Magazine	7/10

i writer Kate Solomon rated the album two out of five stars, describing Arthur's voice as "still very strong with the same slight husk to it, but he is let down by forgettable music and frankly terrible lyrics", ultimately concluding that "[t]here is no passion in his voice and no drama in the music. It's all about as anonymous as a stranger walking past you in the street."

Domenic Strazzabosco of Riff Magazine rated the album 7 out of 10, writing that "though some tracks are indistinguishable from the previous or following, he pours his heart into the lyrics and gives them enough personal touches to make it worth a listen." GSGM and OutLoud! Culture also gave the record a positive review, with the latter defining it an "honest, vulnerable and perfectly crafted album."

== Track listing ==
It'll All Make Sense in the End track listing
No.	Title	Writer(s)	Producer(s)	Length
1.	"Running Away"	James Arthur; Wayne Hector; George Tizzard; Richard Parkhouse	Red Triangle	4:09
2.	"Wolves"	Arthur; Max Wolfgang; Christopher Crowhurst	Chris Loco	3:21
3.	"Medicine"	Arthur; James Yami Bell; Tizzard; Parkhouse	Red Triangle; Matt Rad	3:30
4.	"September"	Arthur; Hector; Tizzard; Parkhouse	Red Triangle	3:42
5.	"Always"	Arthur; Corey Sanders; Mark Ralph	Ralph; Bradley Spence; Alex Beitzke	2:48
6.	"Emily"	Arthur; Bell; Tizzard; Parkhouse	Red Triangle	3:23
7.	"Last of the Whiskey"	Arthur; Bell; Mark Crew; Daniel Priddy; Jack Duxbury	Crew; Priddy; Duxbury	3:31
8.	"Never Let You Go"	Arthur; Sanders; Thomas Barnes; Peter Kelleher; Benjamin Kohn	TMS	3:45
9.	"4000 Miles"	Arthur; Bell; Tizzard; Parkhouse	Red Triangle	3:09
10.	"Deja Vu"	Andrew Jackson; Crew; Priddy	Crew; Priddy	3:04
11.	"Ride"	Arthur; Wolfgang; Crowhurst	Loco	3:49
12.	"Avalanche"	Arthur; Jackson; Duck Blackwell	Blackwell	3:49
13.	"SOS"	Arthur; Bell; Tizzard; Parkhouse	Red Triangle; Rad	3:42
14.	"Take It or Leave It"	Arthur; Joe Housley; Charlie Martin; Richard Boardman; Pablo Bowman; Ralph	Ralph; Spence; Beitzke	3:08
Total length:				48:50

Deluxe edition bonus tracks
No.	Title	Writer(s)	Producer(s)	Length
15.	"Losing You"	Arthur; Jackson; Blackwell	Blackwell; Rad	3:46
16.	"Lose My Mind" (featuring Josh Franceschi)	Arthur; Sanders; Lowe	Cass Lowe	3:20
17.	"Nothing in the Way of Us"	Arthur; Justin Parker; Jon Green	Parker; Rad	3:12
18.	"Religion"	Arthur; Bell; Tizzard; Parkhouse	Red Triangle	3:29
19.	"Be the One"	Arthur; Jamie Graham; Will Vaughan; Anders Hojer	Hojer	2:43
20.	"New Blood"	Arthur; Steve McEwan; Pete "Boxsta" Martin	Martin	5:07

== Charts ==
Chart performance for It'll All Make Sense in the End
Chart (2021)	Peak position
Austrian Albums (Ö3 Austria)	41
Belgian Albums (Ultratop Flanders)	118
Belgian Albums (Ultratop Wallonia)	189
French Albums (SNEP)	195
German Albums (Offizielle Top 100)	59
Irish Albums (OCC)	10
New Zealand Albums (RMNZ)	37
Norwegian Albums (VG-lista)	27
Portuguese Albums (AFP)	20
Scottish Albums (OCC)	4
Spanish Albums (PROMUSICAE)	84
Swiss Albums (Schweizer Hitparade)	16
UK Albums (OCC)	3

== Certifications ==
Region	Certification	Certified units/sales
United Kingdom (BPI)	Silver	60,000^{‡}
^{‡} Sales+streaming figures based on certification alone.
