= Heaven on My Mind (Becky Hill and Sigala song) =

2020 single by Becky Hill

Single by Becky Hill and Sigala

from the album Only Honest on the Weekend and Every Cloud – Silver Linings
- Released: 25 June 2020
- Recorded: 2017–2020
- Length: 3:13
- Label: Eko; Polydor
- Songwriters: Becky Hill; Ryan Campbell; Uzoechi Emenike; Bruce Fielder; Joakim Jarl; Ida Martinsen Botten; George Astasio; Jason Pebworth; Jonathan Shave
- Producers: Sigala; Jarly

Becky Hill singles chronology
"Nothing Really Matters" (2020)	"Heaven on My Mind" (2020)	"Space" (2020)

Sigala singles chronology
"We Got Love" (2019)	"Heaven on My Mind" (2020)	"Lasting Lover" (2020)

Music video
- "Heaven on My Mind" on YouTube

"Heaven on My Mind" is a song by British singer-songwriter Becky Hill and record producer Sigala. It was released on 25 June 2020 as the second single from her debut studio album, Only Honest on the Weekend (2021). The music video for the song, directed by Rebekah Bird, accompanied the song's release and was premiered on the release date.

== Background ==
In a live conversation with Becky Hill, prior to the song's release in June 2020, Sigala opened up about the song's creative process. He said, "I took some people away with me on a songwriting camp in Thailand. I think it was 3 years ago. I wrote it with Ida Botten, Jason Pebworth and Jarly. I loved when we first wrote it and then nothing ended up happening with it." Becky stated if it was going to be for his debut album Brighter Days, to which he responded, "Yeah. I kept working on production and trying different ideas and the next thing I know, Becky Hill's into it! Then you took it and worked on some bits for it as well."

Becky revealed that her, MNEK and Ryan Ashley worked on the song further before it was released. "The drop changed as well. That took a while to get through.", she elaborated. She also dove into what the song was about to her, "Last year was such a horrible year for me. It was weird because my job was going really well. We just put out stuff well that got into the charts and was doing well. Then you flew me out to Jordan and did this incredible video shoot. So work life was going really well, but my personal life was kind of falling to bits. My grandad died and I fell out with friends, went through a break up and moved house and it all happened at once. And then, you put that song in front of me and I liked it because it was never going to be a song I would've written at the time. I was so miserable last year that this song came through and I was like "Oh wait, I can be happy and there is a light at the end of the tunnel" and I really liked that idea of it. When it came to me, me Uzo and Ryan did our work on it and then it all happened."

On 18 June 2020, a week before the song's release, there were sightings of the song exclusively on Tidal, as well as a tweet to announce the song, before both got quickly taken down.

== Music video ==
The music video for "Heaven on My Mind" was uploaded and premiered onto Becky's YouTube account on 25 June 2020. It was directed by Rebekah Bird.

== Charts ==
Chart (2020)	Peak position
Hungary (Rádiós Top 40)	17
Ireland (IRMA)	19
Scotland Singles (OCC)	13
UK Singles (OCC)	14
US Hot Dance/Electronic Songs (Billboard)	46

== Certifications ==
Certifications for "Heaven on My Mind"
Region	Certification	Certified units/sales
Australia (ARIA)	Gold	35,000^{‡}
Brazil (Pro-Música Brasil)	Gold	20,000^{‡}
New Zealand (RMNZ)	Gold	15,000^{‡}
United Kingdom (BPI)	Platinum	600,000^{‡}
^{‡} Sales+streaming figures based on certification alone.
