= Stay the Night (Sigala and Talia Mar song) =

Single by Sigala and Talia Mar

from the album Every Cloud – Silver Linings
- Released: 20 May 2022
- Genre: House
- Length: 2:51
- Label: Ministry of Sound; B1
- Songwriters: Bruce Fielder; Joakim Jarl; Ida Martinsen Botten; George Astasio; Jason Pebworth; Jonathan Shave; Scott Wild
- Producers: Sigala; Jarly

Sigala singles chronology
"Melody" (2022)	"Stay the Night" (2022)	"Living Without You" (2022)

Talia Mar singles chronology
"Good on You" (2021)	"Stay the Night" (2022)	"Sweet Lies" (2022)

Music video
- "Stay the Night" on YouTube

"Stay the Night" is a song by British DJ and record producer Sigala and singer Talia Mar, released as a single on 20 May 2022 by Ministry of Sound and B1 Recordings from Sigala's scrapped second studio album Every Cloud.

It reached number 11 in the UK, where it was also certified platinum in March 2025.

The song has achieved over 100 million streams on Spotify.

== Charts ==
=== Weekly charts ===
Weekly chart performance for "Stay the Night"
Chart (2022–2023)	Peak position
Hungary (Rádiós Top 40)	6
Ireland (IRMA)	22
New Zealand Hot Singles (RMNZ)	25
UK Singles (OCC)	11
UK Dance (OCC)	5
US Hot Dance/Electronic Songs (Billboard)	47

=== Year-end charts ===
Year-end chart performance for "Stay the Night"
Chart (2023)	Position
Hungary (Rádiós Top 40)	64

== Certifications ==
Certifications for "Stay the Night"
Region	Certification	Certified units/sales
United Kingdom (BPI)	Platinum	600,000^{‡}
^{‡} Sales+streaming figures based on certification alone.

== Release history ==
Release history and formats for "Stay the Night"
Region	Date	Format	Label
Various	20 May 2022	Digital download; streaming	Ministry of Sound; B1
