= Lasting Lover =

2020 single by Sigala and James Arthur

Single by Sigala and James Arthur

from the album Every Cloud – Silver Linings
- Released: 4 September 2020
- Length: 3:38
- Label: Ministry of Sound; B1; Arista
- Songwriters: Bruce Fielder; James Arthur; Joakim Jarl; Lewis Capaldi; Corey Sanders; Luke Fitton; Andrew VanWyngarden; Ben Goldwasser
- Producers: Jarly; Sigala; Lewis Capaldi (exec.)

Sigala singles chronology
"Heaven on My Mind" (2020)	"Lasting Lover" (2020)	"You for Me" (2021)

James Arthur singles chronology
"Quite Miss Home" (2019)	"Lasting Lover" (2020)	"Medicine" (2021)

"Lasting Lover" is a song performed by British DJ and record producer Sigala and British singer-songwriter James Arthur. It was also written by Scottish singer-songwriter Lewis Capaldi, widely known for his hit "Someone You Loved". It was released to digital retailers and streaming platforms on 4 September 2020 by Ministry of Sound. The song samples "Time to Pretend" by indie pop and rock band MGMT. It reached number 10 on the UK Singles Chart and the top 10 of the US Dance/Electronic Songs chart.

At the APRA Music Awards of 2022, the song was nominated for Most Performed International Work.

== Personnel ==
Credits adapted from Tidal.

- Bruce Fielder – lyricist, primary artist, production
- James Arthur – lyricist, vocals
- Jarly – lyricist, production
- Anita Jobby (Lewis Capaldi) – lyricist, executive production
- Andrew VanWyngarden – lyricist
- Ben Goldwasser – lyricist
- Corey Sanders – lyricist
- Luke Fitton – lyricist
- Dipesh Parmar – editing, programming
- Paul Whalley – guitar
- Mark Ralph – mix engineering
- Milly McGregor – violin

== Charts ==
=== Weekly charts ===
Weekly chart performance for "Lasting Lover"
Chart (2020–2021)	Peak position
Australia (ARIA)	17
Belgium (Ultratip Bubbling Under Flanders)	33
Canada CHR/Top 40 (Billboard)	33
Czech Republic Airplay (ČNS IFPI)	3
Global Excl. US (Billboard)	130
Hungary (Rádiós Top 40)	2
Hungary (Single Top 40)	27
Ireland (IRMA)	15
New Zealand (Recorded Music NZ)	31
Poland Airplay (ZPAV)	8
Romania (Airplay 100)	11
Scottish Singles Sales (Official Charts)	1
Slovakia Airplay (ČNS IFPI)	40
Sweden (Sverigetopplistan)	94
Switzerland (Schweizer Hitparade)	41
UK Singles (Official Charts)	10
UK Dance (Official Charts)	3
US Hot Dance/Electronic Songs (Billboard)	6
US Pop Airplay (Billboard)	23

=== Year-end charts ===
2020 year-end chart performance for "Lasting Lover"
Chart (2020)	Position
Poland (ZPAV)	82
US Hot Dance/Electronic Songs (Billboard)	84

2021 year-end chart performance for "Lasting Lover"
Chart (2021)	Position
Australia (ARIA)	60
Hungary (Rádiós Top 40)	34
US Hot Dance/Electronic Songs (Billboard)	16

== Certifications ==
Certifications for "Lasting Lover"
Region	Certification	Certified units/sales
Australia (ARIA)	2× Platinum	140,000^{‡}
Canada (Music Canada)	Platinum	80,000^{‡}
Denmark (IFPI Danmark)	Gold	45,000^{‡}
New Zealand (RMNZ)	2× Platinum	60,000^{‡}
Poland (ZPAV)	Gold	10,000^{‡}
United Kingdom (BPI)	Platinum	600,000^{‡}
United States (RIAA)	Gold	500,000^{‡}
^{‡} Sales+streaming figures based on certification alone.

== Release history ==
Release dates and formats for "Lasting Lover"
Region	Date	Format	Label	Ref.
Various	4 September 2020	Digital download; streaming	Ministry of Sound; B1	
Australia	4 September 2020	Contemporary hit radio	Ministry of Sound; Sony	
Italy	18 September 2020	Contemporary hit radio	Sony	
United Kingdom	19 September 2020	Adult contemporary	Ministry of Sound; B1	
United Kingdom	2 October 2020	Contemporary hit radio	Ministry of Sound; B1	

== See also ==
- List of Billboard number-one dance songs of 2020
