= Crazy What Love Can Do =

Single by David Guetta, Becky Hill and Ella Henderson
- Released: 8 April 2022
- Genre: EDM; house; pop
- Length: 2:49
- Label: What a DJ; Warner UK
- Songwriters: Ella Henderson; Becky Hill; David Guetta; Jordan Riley; Lewis Thompson; Naeve Applebaum; Rob Harvey
- Producers: Guetta; Harvey; Riley; Thompson; Applebaum

David Guetta singles chronology
"What Would You Do?" (2022)	"Crazy What Love Can Do" (2022)	"Don't You Worry" (2022)

Becky Hill singles chronology
"Run" (2022)	"Crazy What Love Can Do" (2022)	"History" (2022)

Ella Henderson singles chronology
"Brave" (2022)	"Crazy What Love Can Do" (2022)	"21 Reasons" (2022)

Music video
- "Crazy What Love Can Do" on YouTube

"Crazy What Love Can Do" is a collaborative single by French DJ David Guetta with British singers Becky Hill and Ella Henderson. It was released on 8 April 2022 through What a DJ and Warner UK. A house, pop and electronic dance song, "Crazy What Love Can Do" features themes of female empowerment with lyrics that focus on the feelings and empowerment that love and friendships can bring. It was written and produced by Ella Henderson, Guetta, Jordan Riley, Lewis Thompson, Naeve Applebaum, Rob Harvey, as well as Hill who also provide vocals for the song. A Thelma & Louise-influenced music video was released in April 2022.

Upon release, "Crazy What Love Can Do" garnered a positive reception from music critics. The song peaked at number five on the UK Singles Chart, becoming Guetta's twenty-seventh top ten hit as well Hill's fifth and Henderson's eighth.

== Background and composition ==
"Crazy What Love Can Do" is a house and pop song, which crosses over into electronic dance music, with piano chords and "soaring" vocals from Becky Hill and Ella Henderson. The song follows a structure that builds and layers, beginning with vocals then claps and "catchy piano chords". The lyrics centre on the feelings and empowerment that love and friendship can evoke. Hill and Guetta previously collaborated on the 2021 song "Remember" which was streamed over 150 million times and topped the UK Dance Singles chart, as well as appearing at number 3 on the UK Singles Chart, Irish Singles Chart and Dutch Top 40.

The three artists shared their views on the single. Guetta said "This to me is a summer dance record, and I think it spreads an important message of love and just how powerful it is. I really enjoyed working once again with Becky and working with Ella for the first time was also very exciting. It was a pleasure to work with both these incredible artists." Hill took the opportunity to praise the song's other producers (Riley and Harvey), whilst also noting that it was a shame "that women don't duet together more regularly". Speaking about how both she and Henderson became involved, Hill said "I fell in love with this record the moment I heard it... I knew Ella and I would sound perfect together." Henderson added "This one has been cooking up in the oven for a while so finally letting the world hear it means so much!" EDM Tunes's Matt Seirra compared "Crazy What Love Can Do" to earlier songs by Italian house producers Meduza and English house duo Goodboys, both of whom Hill had previously worked with on the 2019 song "Lose Control".

== Reception ==
=== Critics reviews ===
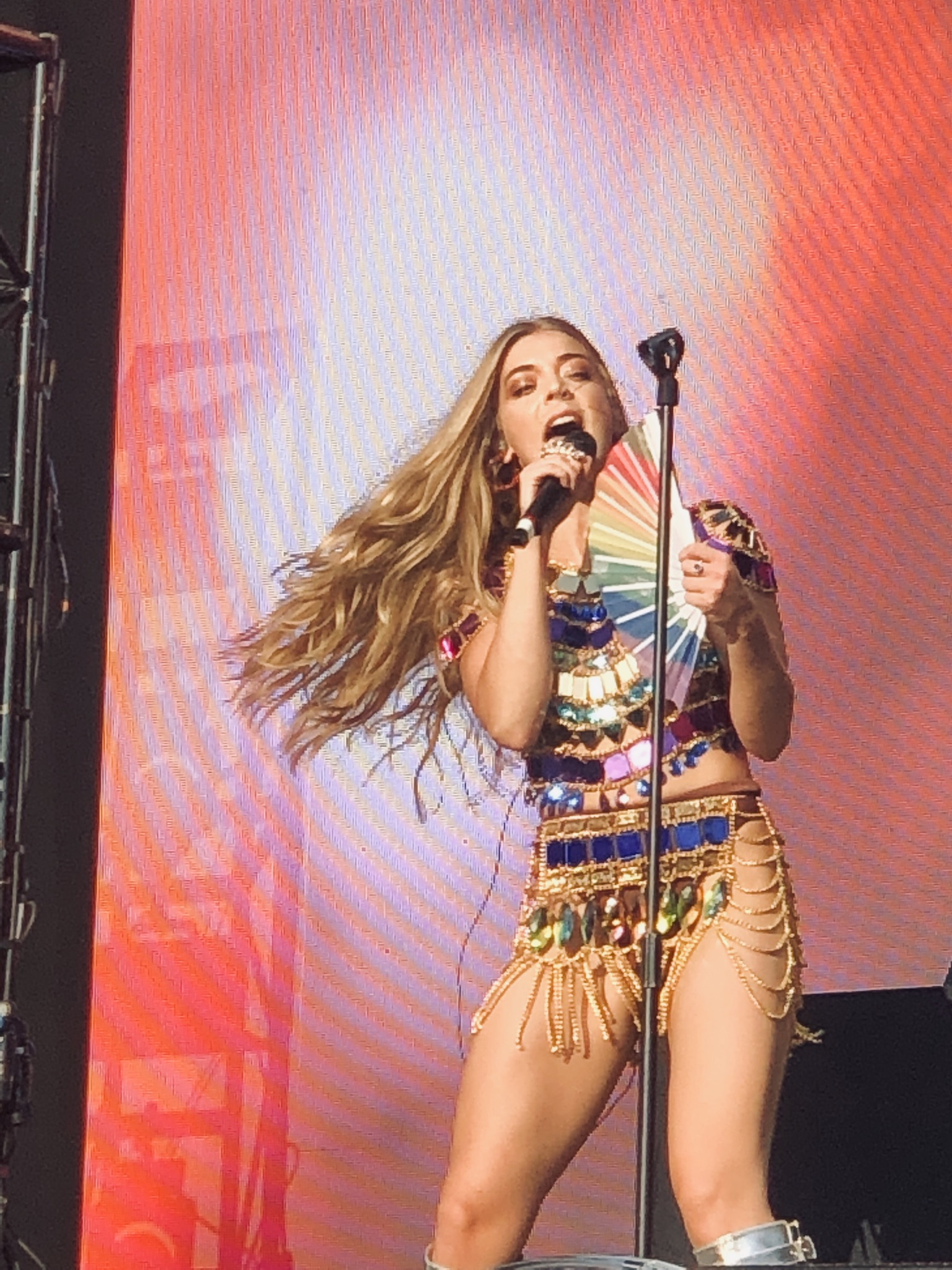
Becky Hill

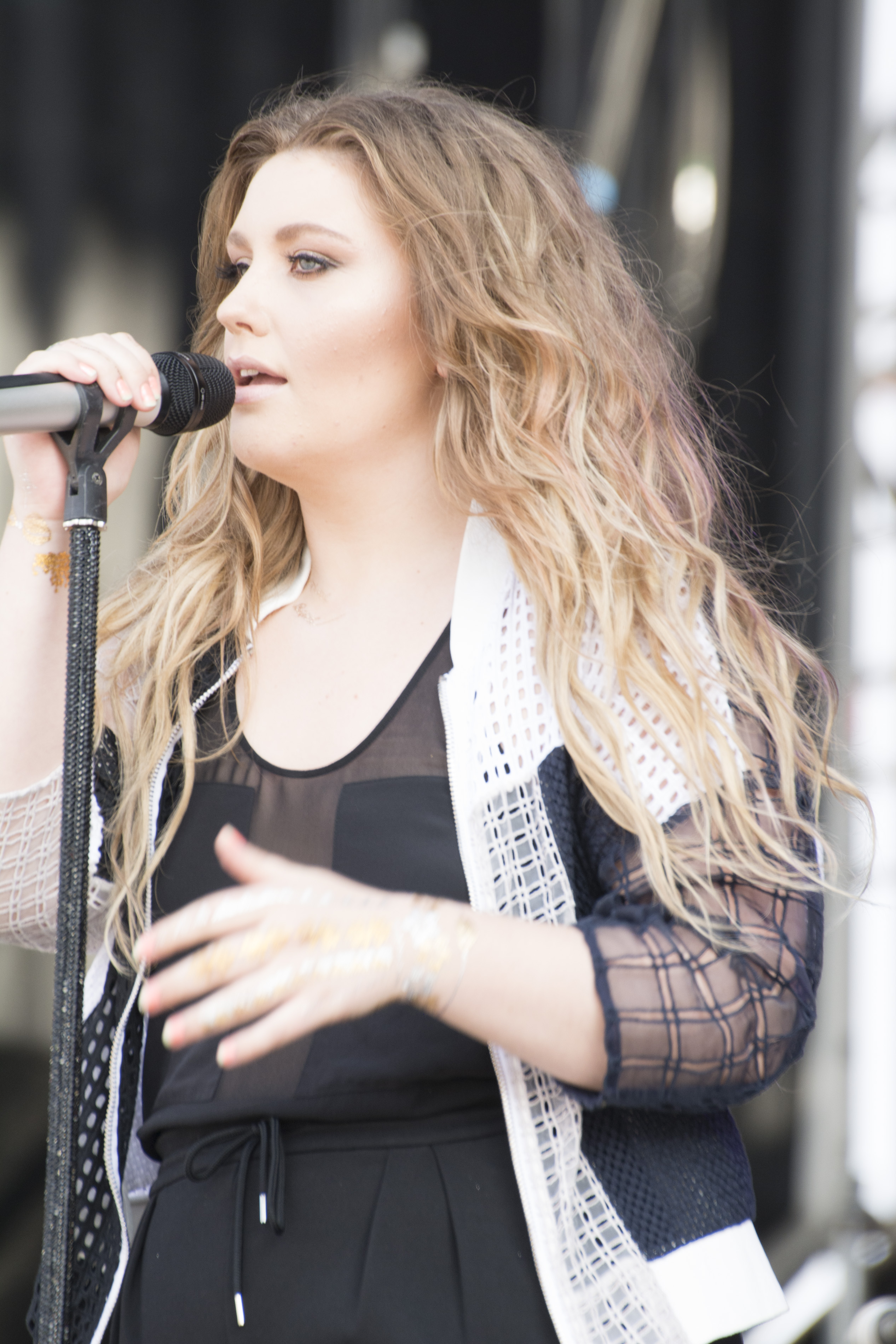
Ella Henderson

Critics praised Hill and Henderson's vocals, describing them as "soaring".

We Rave You's Jackson Naffa praised Guetta's "exquisite production", noting that between that and the vocals, "we get a groovy pop anthem that'll guarantee you're moving on the dance floor!" Similarly, Marissa Tomeo writing for BroadwayWorld praised Hill and Henderson's soaring vocals as being "instantly recognisable" and commending the "euphoric drops in the production which made the song "destined for the sound of summer 2022." Katrina Rees of CelebMix agreed, saying the song would "no doubt be played loud and proud across festivals and clubs over the coming months", further praising the song's female empowerment message and "irresistible piano chords and euphoric drops". Kiss radio's Anna Sky Hulton said the song was "a tune". We Rave You would later go on to publish a positive review of the song's acoustic version. In writing for them, Ryan Ford said "the acoustic version of the track hones in on the breathtaking vocal talents of both Becky Hill and Ella Henderson, as their dulcet tones take centre stage".

=== Commercial performance ===
"Crazy What Love Can Do" peaked in the top ten of six different singles charts, including number two in Poland and UK Dance Singles chart, number six on the Dutch Top 40, New Zealand Hot Singles and German Dance Chart, and number ten on the Irish Singles Chart. Upon release its release, BBC Radio 1's Best New Pop and Party Anthems shows announced their support for "Crazy What Love Can Do". We Rave You would later comment that the song attracted support and rotation from mainstream radio station BBC Radio 1 and music outlet MTV UK, contributing to the song's surge in popularity.

On the UK Singles Chart dated 17 June 2022, Carl Smith of the Official Charts Company noted that "heatwave weather" in the UK had contributed to dance songs receiving a boost on the charts. At the time, Henderson had two collaborations on the UK Singles Chart, "Crazy What Love Can Do" reached a new peak of 12, while her collaboration "21 Reasons" with British DJ Nathan Dawe sat at number 13. "Crazy What Love Can Do" peaked at number 5, spending 19 weeks on the UK charts, opening at number 20, also becoming Henderson's 7th UK top 10 single, Hill's 5th and Guetta's 28th.

== Music videos ==
A music video for "Crazy What Love Can Do" was filmed in Barcelona and Miami. It was released on full on 20 April 2022, via Facebook. In the cinematic visual Henderson and Hill "play two friends who decide to give up their mundane jobs and go on an adventure. Packing their bags, the pair throw their suitcases in the back of a convertible and take off into the desert on a 'journey of a lifetime'." Guetta also appears in the video as a detective investigating their disappearance. Speaking about the music video, Henderson compared it to a Thelma & Louise film. The concept was to "tell the story of how two best friends only need their own self love & each other to take on the world & never look back." The music video was teased with some "movie-style" posters ahead of its release. Hill also posted pictures from the video shoot featuring a 2000s-inspired all-denim outfit.

A second music video focussing on Hill and Henderson performing the song against an acoustic guitar-driven production was released on 6 June 2022.

== Track listing and versions ==
Original version

1. "Crazy What Love Can Do" – 2:49

Extended version

1. "Crazy What Love Can Do" – 4:25

A7S Remixes

1. "Crazy What Love Can Do" (A7S Remix) – 2:43
2. "Crazy What Love Can Do" (A7S Extended Remix) – 3:50
3. "Crazy What Love Can Do" – 2:49

Acoustic Single

1. "Crazy What Love Can Do" (acoustic) – 3:08
2. "Crazy What Love Can Do" – 2:49

Grafix Remixes

1. "Crazy What Love Can Do" (Grafix Remix) – 3:11
2. "Crazy What Love Can Do" (Grafix Extended Remix) – 3:10
3. "Crazy What Love Can Do" – 2:49

Öwnboss Remixes

1. "Crazy What Love Can Do" (Öwnboss Remix) – 2:36
2. "Crazy What Love Can Do" (Öwnboss Extended Remix) – 3:48
3. "Crazy What Love Can Do" – 2:49

David Guetta & James Hype Remixes

1. "Crazy What Love Can Do" (David Guetta & James Hype Remix) – 2:40
2. "Crazy What Love Can Do" (David Guetta & James Hype Extended Remix) – 4:57
3. "Crazy What Love Can Do" – 2:49

Remixes EP

1. "Crazy What Love Can Do" (David Guetta & James Hype Remix) – 2:40
2. "Crazy What Love Can Do" (James Carter Remix) – 2:25
3. "Crazy What Love Can Do" (Header Remix) – 3:05
4. "Crazy What Love Can Do" (Grafix Remix) – 3:11
5. "Crazy What Love Can Do" (Öwnboss Remix) – 2:36
6. "Crazy What Love Can Do" (A7S Remix) – 2:43
7. "Crazy What Love Can Do" – 2:49

Extended Remixes EP

1. "Crazy What Love Can Do" (David Guetta & James Hype Extended Remix) – 4:57
2. "Crazy What Love Can Do" (James Carter Extended Remix) – 3:26
3. "Crazy What Love Can Do" (Header Extended Remix) – 4:05
4. "Crazy What Love Can Do" (Grafix Extended Remix) – 3:10
5. "Crazy What Love Can Do" (Öwnboss Extended Remix) – 3:48
6. "Crazy What Love Can Do" (A7S Extended Remix) – 3:50
7. "Crazy What Love Can Do" (Extended Version) – 4:25

== Personnel ==
Song credits adapted from Tidal, music video credits from YouTube.

=== Single ===
- Ryan Ashley – vocal producer
- Naeve Applebaum – producer
- Peppe Folliero – mastering and mixing engineer
- David Guetta – producer, programmer
- Rob Harvey – producer
- Ella Henderson – vocals
- Becky Hill – vocals
- Jordan Riley – producer, vocal producer
- Lewis Thompson – producer

=== Music video ===
- Flaura Atkinson – editor
- Connor Coolbear – colourist
- John Hassay – commissioner
- Michael Holyk – director
- Andrew Rawson – producer
- Greg Smith – executive producer
- Matt Emvin Taylor – director of photography

== Charts ==
=== Weekly charts ===
Weekly chart performance for "Crazy What Love Can Do"
Chart (2022)	Peak position
Australia (ARIA)	100
Austria (Ö3 Austria Top 40)	64
Belgium (Ultratop 50 Flanders)	12
Belgium (Ultratop 50 Wallonia)	13
Canada CHR/Top 40 (Billboard)	40
Czech Republic Airplay (ČNS IFPI)	28
Czech Republic Singles Digital (ČNS IFPI)	62
France (SNEP)	47
Germany (GfK)	26
German Dance (Official German Charts)	5
Global 200 (Billboard)	87
Greece International (IFPI)	60
Hungary (Dance Top 40)	30
Hungary (Rádiós Top 40)	3
Hungary (Single Top 40)	12
Ireland (IRMA)	5
Italy (FIMI)	72
Latvia (EHR)	2
Lebanon (Lebanese Top 20)	8
Mexico Airplay (Billboard)	42
Netherlands (Dutch Top 40)	6
Netherlands (Single Top 100)	13
New Zealand Hot Singles (RMNZ)	8
Poland Airplay (ZPAV)	2
Romania Airplay (Media Forest)	6
Russia Airplay (TopHit)	65
Slovakia Airplay (ČNS IFPI)	7
Slovakia Singles Digital (ČNS IFPI)	31
Sweden (Sverigetopplistan)	57
Switzerland (Schweizer Hitparade)	29
UK Singles (Official Charts)	5
UK Dance (Official Charts)	2
US Hot Dance/Electronic Songs (Billboard)	12

=== Monthly charts ===
Monthly chart performance for "Crazy What Love Can Do"
Chart (2022)	Peak position
Russia Airplay (TopHit)	73

=== Year-end charts ===
2022 year-end chart performance for "Crazy What Love Can Do"
Chart (2022)	Position
Belgium (Ultratop Flanders)	58
Belgium (Ultratop Wallonia)	64
France (SNEP)	187
Germany (Official German Charts)	70
Global Excl. US (Billboard)	140
Hungary (Rádiós Top 40)	80
Hungary (Single Top 40)	66
Netherlands (Dutch Top 40)	21
Netherlands (Single Top 100)	54
Poland (ZPAV)	29
Switzerland (Schweizer Hitparade)	60
UK Singles (OCC)	21
US Hot Dance/Electronic Songs (Billboard)	47

2023 year-end chart performance for "Crazy What Love Can Do"
Chart (2023)	Position
Hungary (Dance Top 40)	82

2024 year-end chart performance for "Crazy What Love Can Do"
Chart (2024)	Position
Hungary (Dance Top 40)	95

== Certifications ==
Certifications for "Crazy What Love Can Do"
Region	Certification	Certified units/sales
Australia (ARIA)	Platinum	70,000^{‡}
Austria (IFPI Austria)	Platinum	30,000^{‡}
Canada (Music Canada)	Platinum	80,000^{‡}
Denmark (IFPI Danmark)	Gold	45,000^{‡}
France (SNEP)	Platinum	200,000^{‡}
Germany (BVMI)	Gold	200,000^{‡}
Italy (FIMI)	Platinum	100,000^{‡}
New Zealand (RMNZ)	Platinum	30,000^{‡}
Poland (ZPAV)	2× Platinum	100,000^{‡}
Spain (Promusicae)	Gold	30,000^{‡}
Switzerland (IFPI Switzerland)	2× Platinum	40,000^{‡}
United Kingdom (BPI)	2× Platinum	1,200,000^{‡}
^{‡} Sales+streaming figures based on certification alone.

== Release history ==
Release history for "Crazy What Love Can Do"
Region	Date	Format	version	Label	Ref.
Various	8 April 2022	Digital download; streaming	Original	What a DJ; Warner	
Various	3 May 2022	Digital download; streaming	Extended mix	What a DJ; Warner	
Various	13 May 2022	Digital download; streaming	A7S Remixes	What a DJ; Warner	
Various	3 June 2022	Digital download; streaming	Acoustic	What a DJ; Warner	
Various	16 June 2022	Digital download; streaming	Grafix Remixes	What a DJ; Warner	
Various	30 June 2022	Digital download; streaming	Öwnboss Remixes	What a DJ; Warner	
Various	7 July 2022	Digital download; streaming	David Guetta & James Hype Remixes	What a DJ; Warner	
Various	7 July 2022	Digital download; streaming	Remixes EP	What a DJ; Warner	
Various	7 July 2022	Digital download; streaming	Extended Remixes EP	What a DJ; Warner	
