= Melody (Sigala song) =

Single by Sigala

from the album Every Cloud – Silver Linings
- Released: 21 January 2022
- Genre: Pop; house
- Length: 2:47
- Label: Ministry of Sound; B1 Recordings
- Composers: Bruce Fielder; Jakke Erixson
- Lyricists: Bruce Fielder; Ida Botten; Jakke Erixson; Shaun Farrugia; Steve Manovski; Y3llo Koala
- Producer: Sigala

Sigala singles chronology
"Runaway" (2021)	"Melody" (2022)	"Stay the Night" (2022)

"Melody" is a song by British record producer and DJ Sigala from his scrapped second studio album Every Cloud. The single was released on 21 January 2022. by Ministry of Sound and B1 Recordings. The song features uncredited vocals by Norwegian songwriter and singer Ida Botten.

The song reached the top ten on the Dutch charts and the top 40 in the UK and Ireland.

== Background ==
The piece was written in Sigala's studio in London with a group of close friends he has known for a long time. Sigala stated that they decided to create an "unforgettable melody" and eventually used this concept as the basis of the song. The producer also called the song "a new chapter" in his career.

== Music video ==
The music video was published on 4 February 2022 on YouTube and was filmed in the city of Ciudad Nezahualcóyotl, Estado de México, Mexico.

== Charts ==
=== Weekly charts ===
Weekly chart performance for "Melody"
Chart (2022–2025)	Peak position
Belarus (Unistar Top 20)	6
Belgium (Ultratop 50 Flanders)	35
Croatia International Airplay (Top lista)	7
Estonia Airplay (Radiomonitor)	15
Hungary (Single Top 40)	6
Ireland (IRMA)	34
Kazakhstan Airplay (TopHit)	100
Netherlands (Dutch Top 40)	10
Netherlands (Single Top 100)	28
New Zealand Hot Singles (RMNZ)	21
Poland (Polish Airplay Top 100)	1
Russia Airplay (TopHit)	5
Slovakia Airplay (ČNS IFPI)	42
UK Singles (OCC)	31
UK Dance (OCC)	10
US Hot Dance/Electronic Songs (Billboard)	38

=== Year-end charts ===
2022 year-end chart performance for "Melody"
Chart (2022)	Position
Netherlands (Dutch Top 40)	49
Poland (Polish Airplay Top 100)	2

2023 year-end chart performance for "Melody"
Chart (2023)	Position
Hungary (Rádiós Top 40)	10
Poland (Polish Airplay Top 100)	97

2024 year-end chart performance for "Melody"
Chart (2024)	Position
Hungary (Rádiós Top 40)	32
Lithuania Airplay (TopHit)	139
Poland (Polish Airplay Top 100)	92

2025 year-end chart performance for "Melody"
Chart (2025)	Position
Lithuania Airplay (TopHit)	194

== Certifications ==
Certifications for "Melody"
Region	Certification	Certified units/sales
Poland (ZPAV)	Gold	25,000^{‡}
United Kingdom (BPI)	Gold	400,000^{‡}
^{‡} Sales+streaming figures based on certification alone.

== Release history ==
Release history and formats for "Melody"
Region	Date	Format	Label
Various	21 January 2022	Digital download; streaming	Ministry of Sound; B1 Recordings
