= Loose (S1mba song) =

2020 single by S1mba featuring KSI

Single by S1mba featuring KSI

from the album Good Time Long Time
- Released: 11 September 2020
- Genre: British hip hop; afroswing
- Length: 2:32
- Label: Parlophone; Warner
- Songwriter(s): Leonard Rwodzi; Olajide Olatunji; Tyler Hotston; Daniel Traynor
- Producer(s): RELYT; Grades

S1mba singles chronology
"Rover" (2019)	"Loose" (2020)	"Naughty Naughty" (2020)

KSI singles chronology
"Lighter" (2020)	"Loose" (2020)	"Really Love" (2020)

Music video
- "Loose" on YouTube

"Loose" is a song by British singer S1mba from his debut studio album, Good Time Long Time (2021). The song features a guest appearance from British YouTuber and rapper KSI. It was produced by RELYT and Grades. The song was released for digital download and streaming by Parlophone Records on 11 September 2020 as the second single from the album. "Loose" is a British hip hop and afroswing track.

"Loose" received positive reviews from music critics. The song charted at number 14 on the UK Singles Chart and it also reached the music charts of the Republic of Ireland, Netherlands and New Zealand. The accompanying music video was released on 11 September 2020. The video places both artists at a party in a stately home.

== Writing and production ==
Speaking to Clash on the making of "Loose", S1mba said, "I recorded the song, and obviously as you can hear it is just a fun vibe. I was looking for someone fun to just really add to it, to add some more fun to it. I called KSI up and he loved the track". KSI met up with S1mba in a recording studio and recorded a verse for the song.

== Promotion and release ==
On 3 September 2020, S1mba announced via social media that he would soon be releasing a new single titled "Loose". The song's featured artist, cover art and release date were revealed the next day on 4 September 2020, and the song was made available for pre-order. "Loose" was released for digital download and streaming one week later on 11 September 2020 through record label Parlophone, under Warner Music Group. Upon the song's release, S1mba and KSI starred on the cover of Spotify's "New Music Friday UK" playlist, a first for both artists.

=== Remix ===
A remix of the song by British DJ and producer Nathan Dawe was released on 9 October 2020. An audio video for the remix was uploaded to S1mba's YouTube channel on the same day.

== Critical reception ==
GRM Daily called the song "vibrant" and said, "serving as the follow up to his viral hit "Rover" (2020), S1mba's latest offering is just as fun as its predecessor as we hear S1mba and KSI exchange bars to create a playful new single". Dave Bruce of Amnplify called "Loose" "the perfect track to end the summer with", and said, "S1mba and KSI help us loosen up with the smooth rap beat, and head-bopping melody reminiscent of S1mba’s viral hit “Rover”. With both artists bringing their individuality and flare to the single, they perfectly blend their playful personalities and effortless flow. With “Loose”, S1mba leads us out of the summer with an undeniable track, which is set to be a hit".

== Commercial performance ==
In the United Kingdom, "Loose" was the week's highest new entry on the UK Singles Chart, debuting at number 14, becoming S1mba's second top 40 song on the chart and KSI's eighth. During this week, it topped the country's iTunes downloads chart. The song spent the next two weeks at positions 28 and 32, before dropping out of the top 40 of the chart and spending the next six weeks inside the top 100. "Loose" debuted at number 10 on the UK Hip Hop and R&B Singles Chart and spent a total of seven weeks on the chart. Elsewhere, in Scotland, "Loose" debuted at number 11 on the Scottish Singles Chart. In Ireland, the song debuted at number 23 on the Irish Singles Chart and spent seven weeks on the chart. In Europe, the song debuted at number 14 on the Billboard Euro Digital Song Sales.

== Music video ==
A lyric video, created by LadyBug, was uploaded to S1mba's YouTube channel on 11 September 2020. It has received half a million views.

The song's music video premiered on the GRM Daily YouTube channel on 11 September 2020. It has received 6 million views, accumulating 1.1 million views in its first 24 hours, setting a new 24-hour record on the GRM Daily YouTube channel. The video is directed by Capone. The video stars both artists "living their best lives at a lit function at a stately home".

== Credits and personnel ==
Credits adapted from Tidal.

- S1mba – vocals, songwriting
- KSI – vocals, songwriting
- RELYT – production, songwriting
- Grades – production, songwriting
- Jae5 – mixing
- Stuart Hawkes – mastering

== Charts ==
Chart performance for "Loose"
Chart (2020)	Peak position
Euro Digital Song Sales (Billboard)	14
Netherlands (Single Tip)	26
Ireland (IRMA)	23
New Zealand Hot Singles (RMNZ)	7
Scotland (OCC)	11
UK Singles (OCC)	14
UK Hip Hop/R&B (OCC)	10

== Certifications ==
Region	Certification	Certified units/sales
United Kingdom (BPI)	Silver	200,000^{‡}
^{‡} Sales+streaming figures based on certification alone.

== Release history ==
Release dates and formats for "Loose"
Region	Date	Format(s)	Version	Label(s)	Ref.
Various	11 September 2020	Digital download; streaming	Original	Parlophone; Warner	
United Kingdom	11 September 2020	Adult contemporary radio	Original	Parlophone; Warner	
United Kingdom	11 September 2020	Contemporary hit radio	Original	Parlophone; Warner	
Various	9 October 2020	Digital download; streaming	Nathan Dawe Remix	Parlophone; Warner	
