= Medicine (James Arthur song) =

Single by James Arthur

from the album It'll All Make Sense in the End
- Released: 5 March 2021
- Length: 3:30
- Label: Columbia
- Songwriters: George Tizzard; James Bell; James Arthur; Rick Parkhouse
- Producers: Matt Rad; Red Triangle

James Arthur singles chronology
"Lasting Lover" (2020)	"Medicine" (2021)	"September" (2021)

"Medicine" is a song by British singer-songwriter James Arthur. It was released as a digital download and for streaming on 5 March 2021. The song was written by George Tizzard, James Bell, James Arthur and Rick Parkhouse.

== Background ==
On 26 February 2021, Arthur announced the release date for the single on his Twitter account. In a press release, he said, "'Medicine' is an uplifting ode to self, to relationships, to community and connection, and to the healing, restorative powers of love over adversity. It is, you might say, the perfect song for spring 2021. The last year has forced many couple to look at themselves. It held a mirror up to us all, didn't it? And my partner was hugely supportive through that whole time. There are some pretty dark lyrics in there: 'When I’m suicidal, you don't let me spiral…'". In an interview with the Official Charts Company, he said, "When I wrote it six months ago there was no vaccine or any end in sight to this. I definitely felt at the time that I'd like to get this song out as soon as possible, knowing that it would probably be another six months before the world would hear it. It's almost even more fitting now that there's a light at the end of the tunnel."

== Music video ==
A music video to accompany the release of "Medicine" was first released onto YouTube on 5 March 2021.

== Personnel ==
Credits adapted from Tidal.

- Matt Rad – producer
- Red Triangle – producer
- George Tizzard – composer, lyricist
- James Bell – composer, lyricist
- James Arthur – composer, lyricist, associated performer
- Rick Parkhouse – composer, lyricist
- Jermie Inhaber – assistant engineer
- Robin Florent – assistant engineer
- Scott Desmarais – assistant engineer
- Randy Merrill – mastering engineer
- Chris Galland – mixing engineer
- Manny Marroquin – mixing engineer

== Charts ==
Chart (2021)	Peak position
Hungary (Rádiós Top 40)	21
Ireland (IRMA)	55
New Zealand Hot Singles (RMNZ)	13
Sweden Heatseeker Songs (Sverigetopplistan)	5
Switzerland (Schweizer Hitparade)	98
UK Singles (OCC)	41

== Certifications ==
Region	Certification	Certified units/sales
Brazil (Pro-Música Brasil)	Gold	20,000^{‡}
United Kingdom (BPI)	Silver	200,000^{‡}
^{‡} Sales+streaming figures based on certification alone.

== Release history ==
Region	Date	Format	Label
United Kingdom	5 March 2021	Digital download; streaming	Columbia
