= Remember (Becky Hill and David Guetta song) =

Single by Becky Hill and David Guetta

from the album Only Honest on the Weekend
- Released: 18 June 2021
- Genre: Dance; contemporary R&B; house
- Length: 2:40
- Label: Polydor; Eko
- Songwriters: Becky Hill; David Guetta; Karen Poole; Kye Elliot Sones; Lewis Thompson; Luke Storrs
- Producers: Becky Hill; David Guetta; Scott Lowe; Franky Wah

Becky Hill singles chronology
"Last Time" (2021)	"Remember" (2021)	"My Heart Goes (La Di Da)" (2021)

David Guetta singles chronology
"Impossible" (2021)	"Remember" (2021)	"If You Really Love Me (How Will I Know)" (2021)

"Remember" is a song by English singer and songwriter Becky Hill and French DJ and producer David Guetta. It was released on 18 June 2021 as the fourth single from Hill's debut studio album, Only Honest on the Weekend. The song peaked at number three on the UK Singles Chart, becoming Hill's fourth top ten hit and Guetta's twenty-sixth.

Despite only peaking at #34 on the Australian ARIA Charts, it was the second-most played song on Australian radio in 2022.

== Background and composition ==
Musically, "Remember" is a dance, R&B, and house music anthem, having elements of synth-pop, electro-house and electropop. "Remember" is a two-minute & 41-second-long song written at the tempo of 123 beats per minute in common time 4/4 in the key of A-Flat Lydian mode (similar to E-flat Major. For the whole song, it follows Cm—B♭/D -- E♭ -- Fm^{7} -- E♭^{maj7}/G -- A♭^{maj7}. The song talks about Becky who faced challenges when letting go of a fictional "devil" in her mind and increasing her relationship to non-fictionality.

== Music video ==
The music video was directed by Carly Cussan and was released on 25 June 2021, alongside the release of the single.

== Personnel ==
Credits taken from Tidal.

- David Guetta – production, composer, lyricist, associated performer
- Scott Lowe – production, keyboards
- Luke Storrs – production, associated performer, keyboards
- Peppe Follerio – mastering engineer, studio personnel
- Mark Ralph – mixer, studio personnel
- Becky Hill – lyricist, vocalist

== Charts ==
=== Weekly charts ===
Weekly chart performance for "Remember"
Chart (2021–2022)	Peak position
Australia (ARIA)	34
Belgium (Ultratop 50 Flanders)	16
Canada Hot 100 (Billboard)	81
Czech Republic Airplay (ČNS IFPI)	3
Global 200 (Billboard)	89
Hungary (Rádiós Top 40)	23
Ireland (IRMA)	3
Netherlands (Dutch Top 40)	3
Netherlands (Single Top 100)	6
New Zealand (Recorded Music NZ)	30
Norway (VG-lista)	5
Poland Airplay (ZPAV)	11
Portugal (AFP)	198
Slovakia Airplay (ČNS IFPI)	37
South Africa (RISA)	59
Sweden (Sverigetopplistan)	51
Switzerland (Schweizer Hitparade)	96
UK Singles (Official Charts)	3
UK Dance (Official Charts)	1
US Hot Dance/Electronic Songs (Billboard)	8
Venezuela (Record Report)	53

=== Year-end charts ===
2021 year-end chart performance for "Remember"
Chart (2021)	Position
Belgium (Ultratop Flanders)	83
Ireland (IRMA)	24
Netherlands (Dutch Top 40)	6
Netherlands (Single Top 100)	31
Norway (VG-lista)	34
Poland (ZPAV)	72
UK Singles (OCC)	27
US Hot Dance/Electronic Songs (Billboard)	36

2022 year-end chart performance for "Remember"
Chart (2022)	Position
Australia (ARIA)	90
Belgium (Ultratop 50 Flanders)	89
Denmark (Tracklisten)	81
UK Singles (OCC)	52

2023 year-end chart performance for "Remember"
Chart (2023)	Position
US Hot Dance/Electronic Songs (Billboard)	59

== Certifications ==
Certifications for "Remember"
Region	Certification	Certified units/sales
Australia (ARIA)	3× Platinum	210,000^{‡}
Brazil (Pro-Música Brasil)	Platinum	40,000^{‡}
Denmark (IFPI Danmark)	Platinum	90,000^{‡}
France (SNEP)	Gold	100,000^{‡}
Italy (FIMI)	Gold	50,000^{‡}
New Zealand (RMNZ)	3× Platinum	90,000^{‡}
Norway (IFPI Norway)	2× Platinum	120,000^{‡}
Poland (ZPAV)	Platinum	50,000^{‡}
Portugal (AFP)	Gold	5,000^{‡}
Spain (Promusicae)	Gold	30,000^{‡}
United Kingdom (BPI)	3× Platinum	1,800,000^{‡}
United States (RIAA)	Gold	500,000^{‡}
Streaming
Sweden (GLF)	2× Platinum	16,000,000^{†}
^{‡} Sales+streaming figures based on certification alone.^{†} Streaming-only figures based on certification alone.
