= Pull Up (KSI song) =

2019 song by KSI featuring Jme

Song by KSI featuring Jme
- Released: 12 April 2019
- Genre: UK rap; drill; grime; trap
- Length: 3:09
- Label: Self-released
- Songwriter(s): Olajide Olatunji; Jamie Adenuga
- Producer(s): P2J; Sammy Soso

Music video
- "Pull Up" on YouTube

"Pull Up" is a song by British YouTuber and rapper KSI featuring fellow British rapper Jme. It was independently released for digital download and streaming on 12 April 2019. A music video was later released on 4 May 2019. The video portrays a murder mystery narrative, set during the 1920s Chicago prohibition, with KSI playing the role of an Al Capone-like gangster and Jme playing the role of a newspaper journalist attempting to bring him in.

== Writing and production ==
With the drill-type [track] "Pull Up", I just wanted to make a [track] where I could just mean face the whole time while listening to it. I heard the beat and I was like, "Ah, Imma go in. Imma come with some next level flow that people just wouldn't expect." And then I hit up Jme and I [asked him], "What do you think?" [Jme] was gassed and he jumped on [the track] real quick and that was that.

— KSI speaking on the making of "Pull Up".

== Commercial performance ==
In the United Kingdom, "Pull Up" debuted at number 94 on the UK Singles Chart.

== Music video ==
The music video for "Pull Up" was directed by Konstantin. A trailer was released to KSI's social media pages on 1 May 2019. The music video was released to KSI's YouTube channel three days later on 4 May 2019 and it has received over 18 million views. A behind-the-scenes video of the music video shoot was released to YouTube by Konstantin on the same day. The cinematic, film noir-like music video takes a trip back in time to portray a murder mystery narrative, set during the 1920s Chicago prohibition. The video stars KSI as an Al Capone-like antagonist who rapidly gains notoriety for his gangster misdemeanours, whilst Jme plays the role of a newspaper journalist attempting to bring him in.

== Credits and personnel ==
Credits adapted from Tidal.

- KSI – songwriting, vocals
- Jme – songwriting, vocals
- P2J – production, songwriting
- Sammy Soso – production, songwriting

== Charts ==
Chart performance for "Pull Up"
Chart (2019)	Peak position
UK Singles (OCC)	94
UK Indie (OCC)	15

== Release history ==
Release dates and formats for "Pull Up"
Region	Date	Format(s)	Label(s)	Ref.
Various	12 April 2019	Digital download; streaming	Self-released	
