= S1mba =

Zimbabwean-born British singer and songwriter

- Born: Leonard Simbarashe Rwodzi; 12 April 1999 (age 27); Harare, Zimbabwe
- Origin: Swindon, England
- Genres: British hip hop; afroswing
- Occupations: Singer; rapper; songwriter
- Years active: 2018–present
- Labels: Parlophone Records, Rax Productions
- Website: s1mba.co.uk

Leonard Simbarashe Rwodzi (born 12 April 1999), known professionally as S1mba (pronounced "Simba"), is a Zimbabwean-born British singer-songwriter and rapper. He rose to prominence with his single "Rover" featuring DTG, which reached number 3 on the UK Singles Chart as a result of its popularity on the video-sharing platform TikTok, and earned him his first Brit Award nomination for "Song of the Year".

== Early life ==
Rwodzi moved from Harare to Swindon at nine years old before his father was given the job of head gardener at Pusey Estate in Oxfordshire. While in Zimbabwe, he was introduced to music through his experiences with djembe drums and marimbas. In England, Rwodzi formed the foundations of his musical career while at church where he discovered gospel music. Rwodzi attended Faringdon Community College, in the market town of Faringdon. He then attended New College in Swindon where he studied music production and music technology, eventually recording his debut single "The Plan" in the college's music studio.

== Boxing career ==
=== S1mba vs Oogway ===
On 30 August 2023, it was announced that Rwodzi would make his boxing debut against Turkish-Dutch Internet personality MasterOogwgay on the undercard of MF & DAZN: X Series 009 at the Vertu Motors Arena in Newcastle upon Tyne, England on 23 September. However, Rwodzi would later pull out of the bout, being replaced with Armz Korleone.

== Discography ==
=== Mixtapes ===
- 2021: Good Time Long Time

=== Singles ===
==== As lead artist ====
List of singles as lead artist, with selected chart positions, certifications and album name
Title	Year	Peak chart positions							Certifications	Album
Title	Year	UK	AUS	DEN	IRE	NZ	NL	SWE	Certifications	Album
"The Plan"	2018	—	—	—	—	—	—	—		Non-album singles
"High Key"	2019	—	—	—	—	—	—	—		Non-album singles
"24/7"	2019	—	—	—	—	—	—	—		Non-album singles
"Rover" (featuring DTG)	2020	3	7	6	3	8	17	24	BPI: 2× Platinum; ARIA: Platinum; IFPI DEN: Platinum; RMNZ: Platinum	Good Time Long Time
"Loose" (featuring KSI)	2020	14	—	—	23	—	—	—	BPI: Silver	Good Time Long Time
"Bounce" (featuring Tion Wayne and Stay Flee Get Lizzy)	2021	—	—	—	—	—	—	—		Good Time Long Time
"On & On" (with A7S)	2022	—	—	—	—	—	—	—		Non-album singles
"Poppin'" (with Django23 and BNXN featuring TSB)	2022	—	—	—	—	—	—	—		Non-album singles
"Karolina'" (with MayTen)	2022	—	—	—	—	—	—	—		Non-album singles
"Stuck (Your Heart)" (with Blxckie and MayTen)	2023	—	—	—	—	—	—	—		TBA
"Hita" (with Young Franco)	2024	—	—	—	—	—	—	—		TBA

==== As featured artist ====
List of singles as featured artist, with selected chart positions, certifications and album name
Title	Year	Peak chart positions							Certifications	Album
Title	Year	UK	AUS	DEN	IRE	NZ	NL	SWE	Certifications	Album
"Worth It" (ZieZie featuring S1mba and Stylo G)	2020	—	—	—	—	—	—	—		Non-album singles
"Tick Tock (UK Mix)" (Clean Bandit and Mabel featuring S1mba)	2020	—	—	—	—	—	—	—		Non-album singles
"Naughty Naughty" (Preds Uk featuring Swarmz, S1mba and Noizy)	2020	—	—	—	—	—	—	—		Non-album singles
"Ayo!" (Kamille featuring S1mba)	2021	—	—	—	—	—	—	—		Non-album singles
"Glorious" (GRM Daily featuring Dappy and S1mba)	2022	—	—	—	—	—	—	—		Non-album singles
"No Stress" (Amerado featuring S1mba)	2022	—	—	—	—	—	—	—		G.I.N.A

=== Remixes ===
List of remixes
Title	Year	Album
"Get Out My Head (Swarmz & S1mba Remix)" (with Shane Codd)	2021	Non-album single

=== Guest appearances ===
List of non-single guest appearances, with other performing artists
Title	Year	Other artist(s)	Album
"Could Be My Somebody"	2021	Becky Hill	Only Honest on the Weekend
"light on me"	2023	S-X	Things Change (Deluxe)
