= MNEK discography =

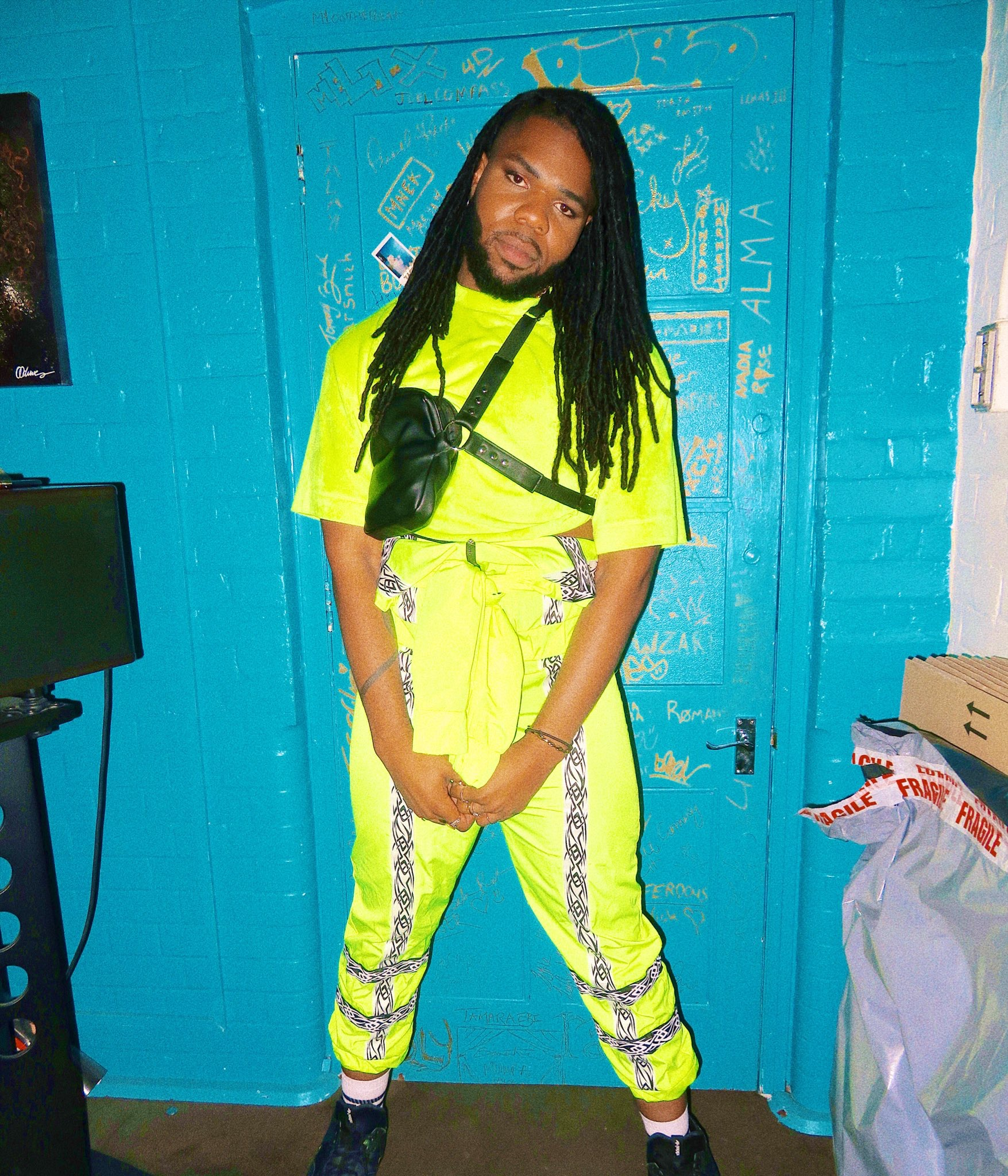
- MNEK in 2019
- Studio albums: 2
- EPs: 1
- Singles: 55

The following list is a discography of recordings by MNEK, a British record producer and recording artist from East London, United Kingdom.

== Studio albums ==
Title	Album details	Peak chart positions	
Title	Album details	UK Sales	UK DL.
Language	Released: 7 September 2018; Label: Virgin EMI; Format: CD, digital download, streaming	100	50
Bulldozer	Released: 18 September 2026; Label: Polydor; Format: Digital download, streaming	—	98

== Extended plays ==
Title	Details
Small Talk	Released: 20 March 2015; Label: Virgin EMI; Format: Digital download, streaming

== Singles ==
=== As lead artist ===
Title	Year	Peak chart positions										Certifications	Album
Title	Year	UK	AUS	DEN	GER	IRE	NL	NOR	NZ	SWE	US	Certifications	Album
"If Truth Be Told"	2011	—	—	—	—	—	—	—	—	—	—		Non-album singles
"Don't Call This Love"	2014	—	—	—	—	—	—	—	—	—	—		Non-album singles
"Every Little Word"	2014	184	—	—	—	—	—	—	—	—	—		Small Talk
"Wrote a Song About You"	2014	66	—	—	—	—	—	—	—	—	—		Small Talk
"The Rhythm"	2015	38	—	—	—	—	—	—	—	20	—	GLF: Gold	Small Talk
"Never Forget You" (with Zara Larsson)	2015	5	3	5	20	15	8	2	6	1	13	BPI: 3× Platinum; ARIA: 5× Platinum; BVMI: Platinum; GLF: 5× Platinum; IFPI DEN: 2× Platinum; IFPI NOR: 2× Platinum; RIAA: 3× Platinum; RMNZ: 4× Platinum	So Good
"At Night (I Think About You)"	2016	87	—	—	—	—	—	—	—	— (Note: "At Night (I Think About You)" did not enter the Swedish Singles Chart, but peaked at number 15 on the Swedish Heatseeker chart.)	— (Note: "At Night (I Think About You)" did not enter the Billboard Hot 100, but peaked at number thirty-four on the Billboard Hot Dance/Electronic Songs chart.)		Non-album singles
"Don't Stop Me Now"	2016	—	—	—	—	—	—	—	—	—	—		Non-album singles
"Paradise"	2017	—	—	—	—	—	—	—	—	—	—		Language
"Deeper" (with Riton featuring House Gospel Choir)	2017	—	—	—	—	—	—	—	—	—	—		Non-album single
"Tongue"	2018	— (Note: "Tongue" did not enter the UK Official Singles Chart, but peaked at number twenty-nine on the UK Official Dance Singles Chart.)	—	—	—	—	—	—	—	—	—		Language
"Colour" (featuring Hailee Steinfeld)	2018	92	—	—	—	66	—	—	—	—	—		Language
"Crazy World"	2018	—	—	—	—	—	—	—	—	—	—		Language
"Correct"	2018	—	—	—	—	—	—	—	—	—	—		Language
"Stopped Believing in Santa"	2018	—	—	—	—	—	—	—	—	— (Note: "Stopped Believing in Santa" did not enter the Swedish Singellista Chart, but peaked at number three on the Swedish Heatseeker Chart.)	—		Non-album single
"Girlfriend"	2019	—	—	—	—	—	—	—	—	—	—		Language
"Valentino" (with Years & Years)	2019	—	—	—	—	—	—	—	—	—	—		Palo Santo
"Who You Are" (with Craig David)	2021	39	—	—	—	85	—	—	—	—	—	BPI: Silver	22
"The Funk" (with Tieks)	2022	—	—	—	—	—	—	—	—	—	—		Non-album single
"Damn (You've Got Me Saying)" (with Galantis and David Guetta)	2022	—	—	—	—	—	—	—	— (Note: "Damn (You've Got Me Saying)" did not enter the NZ Top 40 Singles Chart, but peaked at number 31 on the NZ Hot Singles Chart.)	— (Note: "Damn (You've Got Me Saying)" did not enter the Swedish Singellista Chart, but peaked at number two on the Swedish Heatseeker Chart.)	—		Rx
"Radio" (with Sigala)	2023	—	—	—	—	—	—	—	—	—	—		Every Cloud – Silver Linings
"Oh The Glamour" (with Aluna and Pabllo Vittar featuring Eden Prince)	2023	—	—	—	—	—	—	—	—	—	—		Mycelium
"16 Again" (with Paul Woolford and Lewis Thompson)	2023	—	—	—	—	—	—	—	—	—	—		Non-album singles
"Ten (Get Back Up)" (with Nathan Dawe)	2024	—	—	—	—	—	—	—	—	—	—		Non-album singles
"Will Smith" (with Adanna Duru)	2025	—	—	—	—	—	—	—	—	—	—		Non-album singles
"Reverse"	2026	—	—	—	—	—	—	—	—	—	—		Bulldozer
"Oh No, All the Boys"	2026	—	—	—	—	—	—	—	—	—	—		Bulldozer
"Muscle Marys"	2026	—	—	—	—	—	—	—	—	—	—		Bulldozer
"—" denotes a single that did not chart or was not released in that territory.

=== As featured artist ===
Title	Year	Peak chart positions										Certifications	Album
Title	Year	UK	AUS	BEL (FL)	DEN	GER	IRE	NL	NZ	SWE	US	Certifications	Album
"Ready for Your Love" (Gorgon City featuring MNEK)	2014	4	—	52	—	58	41	98	—	—	—	BPI: Platinum	Sirens
"House Work" (Jax Jones featuring Mike Dunn and MNEK)	2016	85	—	—	—	—	92	—	—	—	— (Note: "House Work" did not enter the Billboard Hot 100, but peaked at number forty-eight on the Billboard Hot Dance/Electronic Songs chart.)	BPI: Gold	Snacks
"Hands" (with various artists)	2016	—	—	—	—	—	—	—	—	—	—		Non-album singles
"Freak Like Me" (Lee Walker & DJ Deeon featuring Katy B & MNEK)	2016	—	—	—	—	—	—	—	—	—	—	BPI: Gold	Non-album singles
"Blinded by Your Grace, Pt. 2" (Stormzy featuring MNEK)	2017	7	—	—	—	—	43	—	—	—	—	BPI: 2× Platinum; RMNZ: Gold	Gang Signs & Prayer
"Bruised Not Broken" (Matoma featuring MNEK and Kiana Ledé)	2019	—	—	—	—	—	—	—	—	—	—		Non-album singles
"Through Enough" (Remix) (VanJess featuring MNEK)	2019	—	—	—	—	—	—	—	—	—	—		Non-album singles
"Head & Heart" (Joel Corry featuring MNEK)	2020	1	2	1	4	4	1	1	5	4	99	BPI: 5× Platinum; ARIA: 6× Platinum; BEA: Platinum; BVMI: 2× Platinum; IFPI DEN: Gold; NVPI: Gold; RIAA: Platinum; RMNZ: 4× Platinum	Four for the Floor and Another Friday Night
"More Than Words" (Sleepwalkrs featuring MNEK)	2020	—	—	—	—	—	—	—	—	—	—		Non-album singles
"Where Did You Go?" (Jax Jones featuring MNEK)	2022	7	40	14	—	27	5	20	— (Note: "Where Did You Go?" did not enter the NZ Top 40 Singles Chart, but peaked at number 13 on the NZ Hot Singles Chart.)	—	—	BPI: 2× Platinum; ARIA: Platinum; BVMI: Gold; RMNZ: Gold	Non-album singles
"Taste So Good (The Cann Song)" (Vincint featuring Hayley Kiyoko, MNEK and Kesha)	2022	—	—	—	—	—	—	—	—	—	—		Non-album singles
"Diamond Life" (Leo Kalyan featuring MNEK)	2022	—	—	—	—	—	—	—	—	—	—		Non-album singles
"Drinking My Water" (Kojey Radical featuring MNEK)	2025	—	—	—	—	—	—	—	—	—	—		Don't Look Down
"Crystallise My Tears" (Danny L Harle featuring Oklou and MNEK)	2025	—	—	—	—	—	—	—	—	—	—		Cerulean
"—" denotes a single that did not chart or was not released in that territory.

=== Guest appearances ===
List of guest and un-credited appearances, showing year released, other artists and album name
Title	Year	Other artist(s)	Album
"Close" (Note: The vocals on the single version of "Close" were re-recorded by Daniel Pearce.)	2013	Sub Focus	Torus
"Spoons"	2013	Rudimental, Syron	Home
"Baby"	2013	Rudimental, Sinead Harnett	Home
"bad_news"	2014	Bastille	VS. (Other People's Heartache, Pt. III)
"Common Emotion"	2015	Rudimental	We the Generation
"SXWME"	2016	Far East Movement, Jay Park	Identity
"No Question"	2016	Shift K3Y, Ryan Ashley	NIT3 TALES
"WTF (Interlude)"	2017	Brayton Bowman	22 Minutes Later
"Worship"	2017	The Knocks	Testify EP
"Late at Night"	2017	Pell	Non-album song
"Not for the Radio"	2017	Tinie Tempah	Youth
"Half of You"	2018	Leland	Sierra Burgess is a Loser OST
"Better Together"	2018	Boston Bun	Non-album songs
"Don't Wanna Dance"	2019	Boston Bun	Non-album songs
"100 Times"	2019	Jax Jones	Snacks (Supersize)
"Find a Place"	2019	Becky Hill	Get to Know
"Perfect Harmony"	2019	Pete Tong, Hero	Chilled Classics
"Bridges"	2020	Kabba	Kabba EP
"Traces (MNEK Remix)"	2021	Tom Aspaul	Black Country Discothèque
