= Imagination (Gorgon City song) =

Single by Gorgon City featuring Katy Menditta

from the album Sirens
- Released: 17 March 2015
- Recorded: 2014
- Genre: House; deep house
- Length: 3:37
- Label: Virgin EMI; Black Butter
- Songwriters: Katy Menditta; Matthew Robson-Scott; Kye Gibbon; Emeli Sandé; Mustafa Omer; James Murray
- Producers: Gorgon City; Mojam

Gorgon City singles chronology
"Go All Night" (2014)	"Imagination" (2015)	"Saving My Life" (2015)

"Imagination" is a song by English electronic music production duo Gorgon City. It features the vocals from South-London vocalist Katy Menditta from their debut studio album Sirens. It was written by Gorgon City, Katy Menditta, Emeli Sandé, Mustafa Omer and James Murray and produced by Gorgon City and musical group Mojam. It was released as an EP with three additional remixes on 31 March 2015.

A remix of the song by Skrillex was commissioned and played during his DJ sets at the time, but was never released.

== Composition ==
An uptempo house song with deep house influences which lasts three minutes and thirty eight seconds. The song has a tempo of 122 BPM.

The song was compared to previous singles "Ready for Your Love", "Here for You" and "Unmissable".

== Track listing and formats ==
- Digital download
1. "Imagination" (featuring Katy Menditta) – 3:38
- EP
1. "Imagination" (featuring Katy Menditta) – 3:37
2. "Imagination" (Weiss Remix) – 6:12
3. "Imagination" (Weiss Dub) – 6:15
4. "Imagination" (Mak and Pasteman Remix) – 5:32

== Charts ==
=== Weekly charts ===
Chart (2014)	Peak chart position
Belgium (Wallonia, Ultratip)	36
CIS Airplay (TopHit)	6
Romania (Airplay 100)	42
UK Dance (Official Charts Company)	39
UK Singles (Official Charts Company)	194

=== Year-end charts ===
Chart (2015)	Position
CIS (Tophit)	24
Russia Airplay (Tophit)	18

== Certifications ==
Region	Certification	Certified units/sales
Brazil (Pro-Música Brasil)	Gold	30,000^{‡}
United Kingdom (BPI)	Silver	200,000^{‡}
^{‡} Sales+streaming figures based on certification alone.
