= Escape (Gorgon City album) =

Studio album by Gorgon City
- Released: 10 August 2018
- Genre: House; deep house; pop-house
- Length: 46:07
- Label: Virgin EMI
- Producer: Gorgon City; Mark Ralph; Vaults

Gorgon City chronology
Sirens (Remixes) (2015)	Escape (2018)	Olympia (2021)

Singles from Escape
- 1. "All Four Walls" Released: 18 March 2016; 2. "Real Life" Released: 19 May 2017; 3. "Go Deep" Released: 11 May 2018; 4. "Hear That" Released: 19 July 2018; 5. "One Last Song" Released: 3 August 2018; 6. "Let It Go" Released: 5 October 2018

Escape is the second studio album by English electronic music production duo Gorgon City. It was released on 10 August 2018 through Virgin EMI Records. The album produced six singles, and includes collaborations with Vaults, Duke Dumont, Naations, Kamille, JP Cooper, Lulu James, D Double E, and Josh Barry, among others.

== Background ==
The duo released the first single, "All Four Walls", featuring vocals from British band Vaults, in April 2016. Around the time of the song's release, the duo announced their second studio album, under the title Kingdom and that it was expected to come in two parts, with the first part being released in August 2016. Furthermore, the duo said that they were to release a new song every three weeks.

== Critical reception ==
Professional ratings
Review scores
Source	Rating
The Arts Desk	3/5 stars
NME	4/5 stars

Thomas H Green of The Arts Desk found the album to be "no worse – and may even be slightly better – than its predecessor", and wrote that its "best tracks have a zest and bounce that's contagious". Green concluded that the duo "adhere to a cool deep house sensibility, deeply flavoured with UK bass culture, never wandering into the crass corridors of EDM". Hannah Mylrea of NME commented that the album "picks up exactly where their debut Sirens left off" with "a string of catchy tunes, though it's also a record of musical experimentation", highlighting "Hear That", "One Last Song" and "Night Drive".

== Track listing ==
Escape track listing
No.	Title	Length
1.	"Kingdom" (featuring Raphaella)	3:52
2.	"Real Life" (with Duke Dumont featuring Naations)	3:25
3.	"Blame" (featuring Josh Barry)	4:05
4.	"Go Deep" (with Kamille and Ghosted)	3:26
5.	"Let It Go" (with Naations)	3:46
6.	"One Last Song" (with JP Cooper and Yungen)	3:24
7.	"Never Enough" (featuring Chenai)	4:02
8.	"Hear That" (featuring D Double E)	3:43
9.	"All Four Walls" (featuring Vaults)	3:12
10.	"Love Me" (featuring Lulu James)	3:48
11.	"Overdose" (featuring Josh Barry)	4:44
12.	"Night Drive" (featuring Kelly Kiara)	4:40
Total length:		46:07

== Charts ==
Chart performance for Escape
Chart (2018)	Peak position
UK Albums (OCC)	45
UK Dance Albums (OCC)	4
