= Voodoo =

Voodoo or Vodou may refer to:

== Religions ==
- West African Vodún, practiced by Gbe-speaking ethnic groups
- African diaspora religions, a list of related religions sometimes called Vodou/Voodoo
  - Candomblé Jejé, also known as Brazilian Vodum, one of the major branches (nations) of Candomblé
    - Tambor de Mina, a syncretic religion that developed in northern Brazil
  - Dominican Vudú, a syncretic religion that developed in the Spanish Empire
  - Haitian Vodou, a syncretic religion practiced chiefly in Haiti
    - Haitian Vodou in Cuba
  - Obeah, also known as Jamaican Voodoo
  - Hoodoo (spirituality), sometimes called Gullah Voodoo or Lowcountry Voodoo
  - Louisiana Voodoo, or New Orleans Voodoo, a set of African-based spiritual folkways
  - Trinidadian Vodunu, a syncretic religion practiced in Trinidad and Tobago
- Voodoo in popular culture, fictional characterizations of various forms of Voodoo

== Technology ==
=== Aircraft ===
- Voodoo (aircraft), a highly modified North American P-51 Mustang
- McDonnell F-101 Voodoo, an American supersonic military fighter
- McDonnell CF-101 Voodoo, the F-101 in Canadian service
- McDonnell XF-88 Voodoo, a prototype jet fighter aircraft, the F-101's predecessor

=== Computing ===
- VoodooPC, a brand of high-end personal computers
- Voodoo Graphics, a series of graphics-acceleration cards manufactured by 3dfx Interactive
- Voodoo, a 3D match moving software program
- Voodoo (company), a video game company

== Music ==
=== Albums ===
- Voodoo (D'Angelo album), 2000
- Voodoo (King Diamond album) or the title song, 1998
- Voodoo (Sonny Clark Memorial Quartet album) or the title song, 1986
- Voodoo (VIXX album) or the title song, 2013
- Voodoo, by Alexz Johnson or the title song, 2010
- Voodoo, by Screamin' Sirens, 1987

=== Songs ===
- "Voodoo" (Godsmack song), 1999
- "Voodoo" (Oh Land song), 2011
- "Voodoo" (Gorgon City song), 2023
- "Voodoo", by Adam Lambert from For Your Entertainment, 2009
- "Voodoo", by Alesha Dixon from Fired Up, 2006
- "Voodoo", by Badshah, with J Balvin and Tainy, 2022
- "Voodoo", by Black Sabbath from Mob Rules, 1981
- "Voodoo", by Body Count from Body Count, 1992
- "Voodoo", by Chris Isaak from Silvertone, 1985
- "Voodoo", by Foolio, 2018
- "Voodoo", by Frank Ocean, 2012
- "Voodoo", by Get Scared from Best Kind of Mess, 2011
- "Voodoo", by Ghost Town from Party in the Graveyard, 2013
- "Voodoo", by the Neville Brothers from Yellow Moon, 1989
- "Voodoo", by Nick Jonas from Last Year Was Complicated, 2016
- "Voodoo", by Paul Gross and David Keeley, 1997
- "Voodoo", by Pitbull from El Mariel, 2006
- "Voodoo", by Queen + Paul Rodgers from The Cosmos Rocks, 2008
- "Voodoo", by Robots in Disguise from Get RID!, 2005
- "Voodoo", by Spice Girls from Greatest Hits, 2007
- "Voodoo", by Spiral Beach, 2008
- "Voodoo", by Teddy Pendergrass from A Little More Magic, 1993
- "Voodoo", by Yngwie Malmsteen from Magnum Opus, 1995
- "Voo Doo", by Rachel Sweet, 1982

=== Other uses in music ===
- Voodoo (opera), 1928, by Harry Lawrence Freeman
- Voodoo Experience, an annual concert in New Orleans, Louisiana, U.S.
- Club Voodoo, a nightclub in Letterkenny, County Donegal, Ireland
- Voodoo, a model of the Gibson Les Paul Studio electric guitar
- DJ VooDoo, of the duo VooDoo & Serano

== Other uses in media and entertainment ==
- Voodoo (comics), a set index article listing several uses, including:
  - Brother Voodoo also known as Doctor Voodoo (Jericho Drumm), a Marvel Comics character
  - Voodoo (Wildstorm) (Priscilla Kitaen), a Wildstorm comics character
- Voodoo (film), a 1995 horror film
- Voodoo (roller coaster), now known as Possessed, a ride at Dorney Park & Wildwater Kingdom, Pennsylvania, U.S.
- Voodoo: Truth and Fantasy, a 1993 non-fiction book by Laënnec Hurbon
- Voodoo (pornstar), the professional pseudonym for Alexandre Boisvert, French-Canadian adult film star

== Sports ==
- New Orleans VooDoo, an arena football team
- Vancouver VooDoo, a defunct roller hockey team

== See also ==
- Voodoo Child (disambiguation)
- Voodoo doll (disambiguation)
- Voodoo economics, a derogatory term for Reaganomics
- Vudu, a content delivery and media technology company
