= Voodoo Child =

Voodoo Child may refer to:

== Related to Jimi Hendrix ==
- "Voodoo Child (Slight Return)", a 1968 song by The Jimi Hendrix Experience
- "Voodoo Chile", another song by The Jimi Hendrix Experience
- Voodoo Child: The Jimi Hendrix Collection, a 2001 album
- Voodoo Child: The Illustrated Legend of Jimi Hendrix, a graphic biography illustrated by Bill Sienkiewicz

== Other uses ==
- "Voodoo Child" (Rogue Traders song), a 2005 dance song
- Voodoo Child (comics), a comic book from Virgin Comics
- Voodoo Child (band), an Indian rock band
- "Voodoo Child", a short story by Graham Masterton
- Moby (born 1965), or Voodoo Child, electronic musician

== See also ==
- Voodoo (disambiguation)
