= Voodoo (comics) =

Voodoo, in comics, may refer to:

== Characters ==
- Voodoo (Wildstorm), a Wildstorm and DC Comics character
- Voodoo Man, a character who appeared in a number of titles from Fox Feature Syndicate
- Voodoo Ben, a character from Scud: The Disposable Assassin
- Brother Voodoo, a Marvel Comics character also known as Doctor Voodoo

== Print media ==
- Voodoo a 1952 horror comic by Four Star Publications
- Voodoom, a comic by Oni Press
- Tales of Voodoo, a comic book series by Eerie Publications
- Voodoo Child (comics), a Virgin Comics title

== See also ==
- Voodoo (disambiguation)
