= Here for You =

Here for You may refer to:

- "Here for You" (Gorgon City song), 2014
- "Here for You" (Kygo song), 2015
- "Here for You" (Maraaya song), 2015
- "Here for You", a song by FireHouse from 3, 1995
- "Here for You", a song by Wilkinson, 2022
