= Lulu James =

British-Tanzanian singer

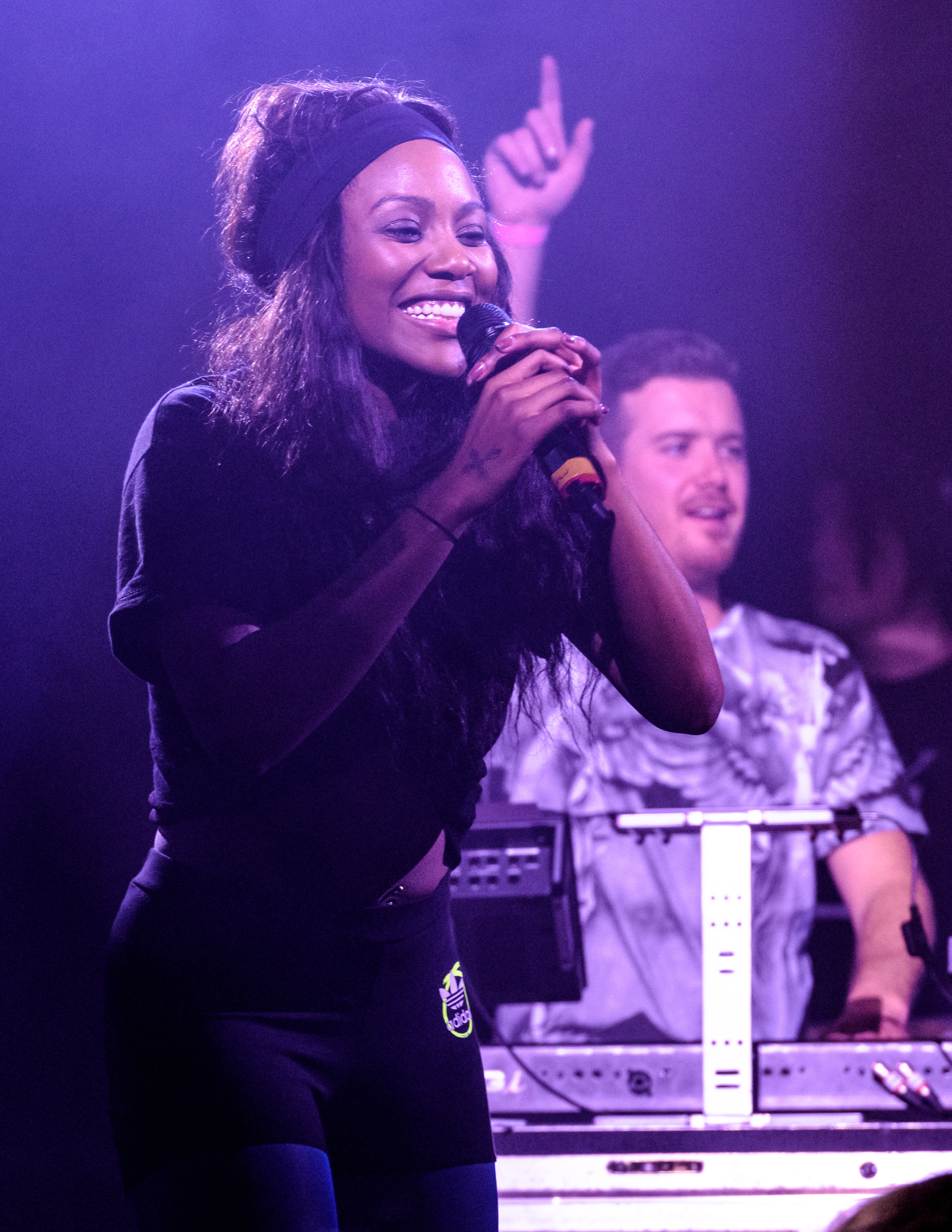
- James performing in 2015

Background information
- Born: 1991 or 1992 (age 34–35); Kilimanjaro Region, Tanzania
- Origin: South Shields, Tyne and Wear, England
- Genres: Electronic, soul
- Occupations: Singer, songwriter
- Years active: 2012–present
- Labels: Black Butter, RCA
- Website: lulujamesmusic.com

Lulu James (born 1991 or 1992) is a British electronic and soul singer.

== Life and career ==
James was born in Tanzania, descended from a Maasai tribe. She moved to the United Kingdom when she was six years old and settled in South Shields in North East England. She enrolled on a music development course, where she met her primary producer and co-writer DomZilla.

James self-released her debut EP, Rope Mirage, in 2012 and subsequently signed to Black Butter Records, which issued her debut single, "Be Safe" / "Stuck". James toured the United Kingdom in late 2012 with labelmates Hostage, Kidnap Kid, and Rudimental. By early 2013, she had signed to RCA Records and released the single "Closer". The single "Sweetest Thing" followed in late 2013, and she toured with Ellie Goulding and Annie Mac Presents. In 2014, she released the single "Beautiful People", with an EP to follow later in the year. In 2015, James served as a vocalist on house duo Gorgon City's UK tour.

James's musical inspirations include India.Arie, Beyoncé, James Blake, Mariah Carey, Diplo, Aretha Franklin, Whitney Houston, Michael Jackson, Grace Jones, Gil Scott-Heron, Amy Winehouse, and Jamie xx.

== Discography ==
=== Singles ===
Year	Single	Peak positions		Album
Year	Single	UK	DEN	Album
2013	"Sweetest Thing"	–	26	

Others

- 2012: Rope Mirage (EP)
- 2012: "Be Safe"/"Stuck"
- 2013: "Closer"
- 2013: "Step by Step"
- 2014: "Beautiful People"
- 2016: Colours (EP)
- 2019: "Lulu James Presents 3rdCultureKid"/"ZIM ZIMMER"

Featured in

- 2013: "Why Didn't You Call?" (Gang Colours feat. Lulu James)
- 2014: "We Disappear" (Jon Hopkins feat. Lulu James)
- 2015: "Loving You" (Lane 8 feat. Lulu James)
- 2017: "Tear My Heart" (Moon Boots feat LuLu James [Marquis Hawkes Extended Mix])
