= The Rhythm =

Single by MNEK

from the EP Small Talk
- Released: 19 January 2015
- Recorded: 2014
- Genre: Deep house; UK garage
- Length: 4:06
- Label: Virgin EMI
- Songwriter(s): Uzoechi Emenike; Kersha Bailey
- Producer(s): MNEK

MNEK singles chronology
"Wrote a Song About You" (2014)	"The Rhythm" (2015)	"Never Forget You" (2015)

"The Rhythm" is a song by British singer MNEK. The song was released in the United Kingdom on 19 January 2015 as a digital download, as the third and final single from his debut extended play Small Talk. The song peaked at number 38 on the UK Singles Chart.

== Music video ==
A music video to accompany the release of "The Rhythm" was first released onto YouTube on 12 February 2015 at a total length of four minutes and fifteen seconds.

== Track listing ==
Digital download – single
No.	Title	Length
1.	"The Rhythm"	4:06

Digital download – Remixes
No.	Title	Length
1.	"The Rhythm" (featuring Little Simz) (Remix)	4:55
2.	"The Rhythm" (Alpines Remix)	3:46
3.	"The Rhythm" (Astronomyy Remix)	4:40
4.	"The Rhythm" (XO Remix)	5:19

== Chart performance ==
=== Weekly charts ===
Chart (2015)	Peak position
Scotland (OCC)	32
Sweden (Sverigetopplistan)	20
UK Singles (OCC)	38

== Certifications ==
Region	Certification	Certified units/sales
Sweden (GLF)	Gold	20,000^{‡}
^{‡} Sales+streaming figures based on certification alone.

== Release history ==
Region	Date	Format	Label
United Kingdom	19 January 2015	Digital download	Virgin EMI
