= Intentions (Gorgon City song) =

Single by Gorgon City featuring Clean Bandit
- Released: 10 May 2013
- Recorded: 2012–2013
- Genre: Dance; house
- Length: 3:37
- Label: Black Butter; Polydor
- Songwriters: Kye Gibbon; Matt Robson-Scott; Nicole Marshall

Gorgon City singles chronology
"Real" (2013)	"Intentions" (2013)	"Ready for Your Love" (2014)

Clean Bandit singles chronology
"Mozart's House" (2013)	"Intentions" (2013)	"Dust Clears" (2013)

"Intentions" is a song by English electronic music production duo Gorgon City. It features vocals from singer Nikki Cislyn and strings from British group Clean Bandit. The song was released in the United Kingdom as a digital download on 10 May 2013. The song has charted in Belgium.

== Music video ==
A music video to accompany the release of "Intentions" was created by Jason Baker. It was first released onto YouTube on 6 May 2013 at a total length of three minutes and thirty-seven seconds. It has received more than one million views as of March 2016.

== Track listing ==
Digital download
No.	Title	Length
1.	"Intentions"	3:37
2.	"Intentions" (Club Mix)	5:25
3.	"Cycles"	7:14

== Charts ==
Chart (2013)	Peak position
Belgium (Ultratip Bubbling Under Flanders)	88
Belgium Dance (Ultratop Flanders)	48

== Release history ==
Region	Date	Format	Label
United Kingdom	10 May 2013	Digital download	Black Butter; Polydor
