= Laura Welsh =

- Also known as: Hey Laura
- Born: 1986 (age 38–39); Staffordshire, England
- Genres: Indie pop
- Occupation: Singer

Laura Welsh (born 1986) is an English indie pop singer from Staffordshire.

Welsh was lead vocalist with the group Laura & the Tears in the late 2000s, and released one EP with the group in 2009, entitled Love Live On. Following the dissolution of the group, she moved to London and pursued a solo career, first under the moniker Hey Laura, and then simply as Laura Welsh. She began recording with Emile Haynie and Lightspeed Champion and began releasing singles in 2013 through Polydor Records. In 2014 she opened for Ellie Goulding and London Grammar and was the vocalist on "Here for You", a single by Gorgon City which reached the UK charts. In the US, her self-titled EP reached #23 on the Billboard Heatseekers chart in 2014, and the single "Undiscovered", which appeared on the Fifty Shades of Grey Soundtrack, peaked at #38 on the Rock Songs chart the following year. Her music video for "Cold Front" was co-directed and co-choreographed by Daniel "Cloud" Campos and features a performance by Tamara Levinson.

She studied music at Birmingham College.

== Discography ==
- Laura Welsh EP (Polydor Records, 2014)
- Soft Control (Polydor Records, 2015)
- See Red EP (TwentyTwoSeven Recordings, 2016)
