= Real (Gorgon City song) =

Single by Gorgon City featuring Yasmin

from the album Real EP and Sirens
- Released: 2013
- Recorded: 2012
- Genre: Deep house
- Length: 4:37
- Label: D:vision; Black Butter
- Songwriters: Kye Gibbon; Matt Robson-Scott
- Producers: Foamo; RackNRuin

Gorgon City singles chronology
"Real" (2013)	"Intentions" (2013)

Yasmin singles chronology
"Light Up (The World)" (2012)	"Real" (2013)	"True" (2013)

"Real" is the debut single by English electronic music production duo Gorgon City. It features singer Yasmin on vocals. The song is the lead single from their debut album Sirens, and also the title track of their 2013 EP, Real. It peaked at No. 44 on the UK Singles Chart, No. 9 on the UK Dance Singles Chart and No. 7 on the UK Independent Singles Chart.

== Track listing ==
Digital download – single
No.	Title	Length
1.	"Real" (featuring Yasmin; original mix)	4:37

Digital download – Oscar Key Sung / Walden Remixes
No.	Title	Length
1.	"Real" (Walden Remix)	5:25
2.	"Real" (Oscar Key Sung Edit)	3:45

== Personnel ==
Gorgon City

- Foamo – production
- RackNRuin – production

Additional personnel

- Yasmin – vocals

== Chart performance ==
Chart performance for "Real"
Chart (2013)	Peak position
Belgium (Ultratop 50 Flanders)	30
UK Singles (Official Charts Company)	44
UK Dance (Official Charts)	9
UK Indie (Official Charts)	7

== Release history ==
Release history and formats for "Real"
Region	Date	Format	Label
United Kingdom	17 February 2013	Digital download	Black Butter; D:vision
