= Go All Night =

Single by Gorgon City featuring Jennifer Hudson

from the album Sirens
- Released: 14 December 2014
- Recorded: 2013
- Genre: House
- Length: 3:21
- Label: Virgin EMI
- Songwriter(s): Kye Gibbon; Matthew Robson-Scott; Kiesza Rae Ellestad
- Producer(s): Gorgon City

Gorgon City singles chronology
"Unmissable" (2014)	"Go All Night" (2014)	"Imagination" (2015)

Jennifer Hudson singles chronology
"It's Your World" (2014)	"Go All Night" (2014)	"Trouble" (2015)

"Go All Night" is a song by English electronic music production duo Gorgon City. It features the vocals from American singer Jennifer Hudson. It was released on 14 December 2014 as a single from their debut studio album Sirens. The song was written by Kye Gibbon, Matthew Robson-Scott and Kiesza, and produced by Gorgon City. It has peaked at number 14 on the UK Singles Chart.

== Music video ==
A music video to accompany the release of "Go All Night" was first released onto YouTube on 6 November 2014 at a total length of three minutes and fifty-two seconds.

Idolator.com said: "Gorgon City and Jennifer Hudson’s sparkling collaboration on “Go All Night” is fit for underground house clubs, which is exactly the theme for the song's official video! Directed by Roboshobo, the visual takes place at a rave that is ripped straight from the late-’90s. There are dancers vogueing, ladies beating their face with makeup and the musicians performing the tune on stage. It looks like a damn good time!".

== Track listing and formats ==
Digital download – single
No.	Title	Length
1.	"Go All Night" (featuring Jennifer Hudson)	3:20

Digital download – remixes
No.	Title	Length
1.	"Go All Night" (Wilkinson Remix)	4:14
2.	"Go All Night" (Booka Shade Remix)	7:02
3.	"Go All Night" (Illyus & Barrientos Remix)	5:52
4.	"Go All Night" (Drew Hill Remix)	5:31
5.	"Go All Night" (Aquilo Remix)	3:25

Digital download – US iTunes EP
No.	Title	Length
1.	"Go All Night" (Extended Mix)	5:22
2.	"Go All Night" (Wilkinson Remix)	4:12
3.	"Go All Night" (Booka Shade Remix)	7:02
4.	"Go All Night" (Illyus & Barrientos Remix)	5:52
5.	"Go All Night" (Drew Hill Remix)	5:31
6.	"Go All Night" (Aquilo Remix)	3:25
7.	"Go All Night" (Erick Morillo Club Mix)	6:49
8.	"Go All Night" (Warehouse Dub)	6:45

== Charts ==
=== Weekly charts ===
Chart (2014–15)	Peak position
Belgium (Ultratip Bubbling Under Flanders)	36
Belgium (Ultratip Bubbling Under Wallonia)	22
Scotland (OCC)	13
UK Dance (OCC)	2
UK Singles (OCC)	14
US Hot Dance/Electronic Songs (Billboard)	15
US Dance Club Songs (Billboard)	1

=== Year-end charts ===
Chart (2015)	Position
US Dance Club Songs (Billboard)	11
US Hot Dance/Electronic Songs (Billboard)	90

== Certifications ==
Region	Certification	Certified units/sales
United Kingdom (BPI)	Silver	200,000^{‡}
^{‡} Sales+streaming figures based on certification alone.

== Release history ==
Region	Date	Format	Label
United Kingdom	14 December 2014	Digital download	Virgin EMI

== See also ==
- List of number-one dance singles of 2015 (U.S.)
