= Real (Gorgon City EP) =

Extended play by Gorgon City

EP by Gorgon City
- Released: 17 February 2013
- Recorded: 2012
- Genre: Dance; house
- Length: 21:32:00
- Label: Black Butter; Polydor
- Producer: Kye Gibbon; Matt Robson-Scott; Yasmin Zarine Shahmir

Gorgon City EPs chronology
The Crypt (2012)	Real (2013)	Money (2016)

Singles from Real
- 1. "Real" Released: 17 February 2013

"Real" is an extended play (EP) by English electronic music production duo Gorgon City. Its title single "Real" features vocals from Yasmin, and was released in the United Kingdom as a digital download on 17 February 2013. The song peaked at number 44 on the UK Singles Chart and number 7 on the UK Indie Chart, and appears on their debut studio album Sirens.

== Track listing ==
Digital download – EP
No.	Title	Length
1.	"Real" (featuring Yasmin)	4:37
2.	"Thor"	6:16
3.	"Athena"	5:20
4.	"10 Below"	6:19

== Release history ==
Region	Date	Format	Label
United Kingdom	17 February 2013	Digital download	Black Butter; Polydor

== Personnel ==
Gorgon City

- Foamo – production
- RackNRuin – production

Additional personnel

- Yasmin – vocals
