= Sirens (Gorgon City album) =

Studio album by Gorgon City
- Released: 6 October 2014
- Recorded: 2012–2014
- Genre: Deep house; house; dance; electronic
- Length: 50:18
- Label: Virgin EMI; Black Butter
- Producer: Gorgon City

Gorgon City chronology
Sirens (2014)	Sirens (Remixes) (2015)

Singles from Sirens
- 1. "Real" Released: 17 February 2013; 2. "Ready for Your Love" Released: 26 January 2014; 3. "Here for You" Released: 15 June 2014; 4. "Unmissable" Released: 28 September 2014; 5. "Go All Night" Released: 14 December 2014; 6. "Imagination" Released: 17 March 2015

Sirens is the debut studio album by English electronic music production duo Gorgon City. It was released on 6 October 2014. The album features vocals from Katy B and Jennifer Hudson among others, and writing credits from Kiesza and Emeli Sandé among others. The album debuted at number 10 on the UK Albums Chart.

Gorgon City released released Sirens (Remixes) featuring remixes from their debut album on 7 April 2015 in the UK. It also includes two Gorgon City remixed singles: "Hideaway" by Kiesza and "Say You Love Me" by Jessie Ware.

== Singles ==
- "Real" was released as the album's lead single on 17 February 2013; it was also the title track to the EP Real, accompanied by three non-album songs. The song features vocals by Yasmin, and peaked at number 44 on the UK Singles Chart.
- "Ready for Your Love" was released on 26 January 2014 as the album's second single. It features vocals by MNEK and entered the UK Singles Chart at number four.
- "Here for You" was released as the album's third single on 15 June 2014. It features vocals by Laura Welsh. The song entered the UK Singles Chart at number seven.
- "Unmissable" was released as the album's fourth single on 28 September 2014. It features vocals by Zak Abel. The song entered the UK Singles Chart at number nineteen.
- "Go All Night" was released as the album's fifth single on 14 December 2014. It features vocals by American recording artist Jennifer Hudson. The single peaked at number fourteen on the UK Singles Chart, becoming Hudson's first top 20 single in Britain since 2008's "Spotlight".
- "Imagination" was released in the form of a Beatport-exclusive remix package on 17 March 2015.

=== Promotional singles ===
- "Lover Like You" was released as iTunes UK's "Single of the Week" for free download on 13 October 2014. It features vocals by Katy B.

== Track listing ==
Sirens track listing
No.	Title	Writer(s)	Producer(s)	Length
1.	"Coming Home" (featuring Maverick Sabre)	Kye Gibbon; Matthew Robson-Scott; Michael Stafford; Jonny Coffer	Gorgon City; Jonny Coffer	4:06
2.	"Ready for Your Love" (featuring MNEK)	Gibbon; Robson-Scott; Uzoechi Emenike	Gorgon City	3:17
3.	"Lover Like You" (featuring Katy B)	Gibbon; Robson-Scott; Kathleen Brien; Coffer	Gorgon City	3:36
4.	"Here for You" (featuring Laura Welsh)	Gibbon; Robson-Scott; Laura Welsh; Emenike	Gorgon City	3:53
5.	"FTPA" (featuring Erik Hassle)	Gibbon; Robson-Scott; Erik Hassle; Daniel Ledinsky; Coffer	Gorgon City	4:44
6.	"Go All Night" (featuring Jennifer Hudson)	Gibbon; Robson-Scott; Kiesa Rae Ellestad	Gorgon City	3:20
7.	"Unmissable" (featuring Zak Abel)	Gibbon; Robson-Scott; Coffer; James Napier	Gorgon City; Coffer	3:38
8.	"Real" (featuring Yasmin)	Gibbon; Robson-Scott; Yasmin Shahmir	Gorgon City	4:24
9.	"Imagination" (featuring Katy Menditta)	Gibbon; Robson-Scott; Katy Menditta; Emeli Sandé; Mustafa Omer; James Murray	Gorgon City; Mojam	3:37
10.	"6AM" (featuring Tish Hyman)	Gibbon; Robson-Scott; Latisha Hyman	Gorgon City	3:51
11.	"Elevate" (featuring Anne-Marie)	Gibbon; Robson-Scott; Ed Thomas; Martyna Baker	Gorgon City	3:41
12.	"Take It All" (featuring The Six)	Gibbon; Robson-Scott; Richard Boardman; Robert Harvey; Cleo Tighe; Daniel Boyle	Gorgon City	3:33
13.	"Hard on Me" (featuring Maverick Sabre)	Gibbon; Robson-Scott; Stafford; Coffer	Gorgon City; Coffer	4:37
Total length:				50:18

Deluxe edition bonus tracks
No.	Title	Writer(s)	Producer(s)	Length
14.	"Try Me Out" (featuring Anne-Marie)	Gibbon; Robson-Scott; Anne-Marie Nicholson; James Newman; Coffer	Gorgon City	4:19
15.	"No More" (featuring LIV)	Gibbon; Robson-Scott; Olivia Redmond; Fred Falke; Brian Higgins; Toby Scott	Gorgon City; Fred Falke; Brian Higgins	3:36
16.	"Here for You (Vevo Stripped Session)" (featuring Laura Welsh)	Gibbon; Robson-Scott; Welsh; Emenike	Gorgon City	3:45
17.	"Doing It Wrong" (featuring LIV)	Aubrey Graham; Noah Shebib; Don McLean	Gorgon City	3:02
Total length:				65:01

Deluxe edition bonus videos
No.	Title	Writer(s)	Length
18.	"Ready for Your Love" (featuring MNEK)	Gibbon; Robson-Scott; Emenike	3:28
19.	"Here for You" (featuring Laura Welsh)	Gibbon; Robson-Scott; Welsh; Emenike	3:53
Total length:			72:22

Notes

- "Doing It Wrong" is a cover of the song by Drake featuring Stevie Wonder.

== Charts ==
Chart performance for Sirens
Chart (2014)	Peak position
Belgian Albums (Ultratop Flanders)	112
Belgian Albums (Ultratop Wallonia)	176
Scottish Albums (OCC)	22
UK Albums (OCC)	10
UK Dance Albums (OCC)	1

== Certifications ==
Certifications for Sirens
Region	Certification	Certified units/sales
United Kingdom (BPI)	Gold	100,000^{‡}
^{‡} Sales+streaming figures based on certification alone.

== Release history ==
Release history and formats for Sirens
Region	Date	Format	Label
United Kingdom	6 October 2014	Digital download; LP; CD	Virgin EMI; Black Butter
