= Vaults (band) =

British electronica band

- Origin: London, England
- Genres: Electronic; synthpop
- Years active: 2013–2017
- Labels: Republic; Virgin EMI
- Past members: Blythe Pepino; Barney Freeman; Ben Vella

Vaults were a British electronic music group from London, England, composed of Blythe Pepino, Barney Freeman, and Ben Vella. The band split up in 2017.

== History ==
The band was founded in 2013, after Pepino was recruited to provide vocals on Freeman and Vella's musical project. Their first track as a group, "Cry No More", was posted to SoundCloud independently in 2013; it gathered 100,000 plays within its first week.

Their debut single, "Premonitions", was released in 2014 by independent record label National Anthem. They released their first EP, Vultures, later in the same year. After being signed to Virgin EMI in 2014, Vaults released debut major-label single "Lifespan", followed by "Vultures". During the summer of 2014, Vaults performed at the Lovebox, T in the Park, and Reading and Leeds festivals.

In 2015, they released single "One Last Night", which later appeared on the motion picture soundtrack for Fifty Shades of Grey. This was followed by a re-issue of "Cry No More". They released their second EP, also titled Cry No More, on 31 July 2015. Pepino appeared on Gorgon City single, "All Four Walls", in March 2016.

Vaults' single "Midnight River", released in July 2016, was named Single of the Week by The Guardian.

The London Evening Standard reported in April 2016 that Vaults' music videos had gathered a combined 20 million views without having released an album.

They also performed the music for the 2016 John Lewis Christmas advert, with a cover of Randy Crawford's "One Day I'll Fly Away".

The band collectively announced the decision to split on 25 May 2017 on their official Facebook page, citing the loss of a creative spark for the band.

"Dear Vaulters, it is with a heavy heart we post this today, but after much discussion we have decided to go our separate ways. The last few years have been equally amazing and very challenging, both on personal and professional levels. After caught in still was released we took some much needed time off, but when we discussed how we might go forward it became clear that the spark you need to make a band work had gone. We leave on good terms, with some amazing memories and feeling very proud of the record we put out. Thanks from the bottom of our hearts to everyone that ever came to a gig, caught us at a festival, or bought a record, and everyone from management to label to live team that's ever worked with us. It's meant the world to us. Much love BB&B x"

— Vaults

Pepino now performs with the band Mesadorm (originally founded in 2015), who released debut album, Heterogaster, on 11 May 2018, while Ben Vella formed the band Child of the Parish, with his brother Tom and the artist Pius Bak.

In June 2024, 38-year-old Blythe Pepino was credited with her first solo hit after the Sonny Fodera's track "Mind Still", on which she is the featured vocalist, moved into the Top 75 at number 74.

== Personal lives ==
In early 2016, Pepino was interviewed about her polyamorous relationship with boyfriend Tom Jacob by The Independent.

== Discography ==
=== Studio albums ===
| Title | Details |
|---|---|
| Caught in Still Life | Released: 2 December 2016; Label: Virgin EMI Records; Format: Digital download, CD |

=== Extended plays ===
| Title | Details |
|---|---|
| Vultures | Released: 17 November 2014; Label: Virgin EMI Records; Format: Digital download |
| Remixed | Released: 27 April 2015; Label: Virgin EMI Records; Format: Digital download |
| Cry No More | Released: 2015; Label: Virgin EMI Records; Format: Digital download |

=== Singles ===
==== As lead artist ====
| Year | Title | Peak chart positions | | Album |
| Year | Title | UK | SCO | Album |
|---|---|---|---|---|
| 2014 | "Premonitions" | — | — | Caught in Still Life |
| 2014 | "Lifespan" | — | — | Caught in Still Life |
| 2015 | "Cry No More" | — | — | Caught in Still Life |
| 2016 | "Midnight River" | — | — | Caught in Still Life |
| 2016 | "Hurricane" | — | — | Caught in Still Life |
| 2016 | "One Day I'll Fly Away" | 53 | 15 | Caught in Still Life |

==== As featured artist ====
| Year | Title | Peak chart positions | | Album |
| Year | Title | UK | UK Dance | Album |
|---|---|---|---|---|
| 2016 | "All Four Walls" (Gorgon City featuring Vaults) | 85 | 21 | Escape |
