= Unmissable =

Single by Gorgon City featuring Zak Abel

from the album Sirens
- Released: 28 August 2014
- Recorded: 2012–13
- Genre: Deep house; UK garage
- Length: 3:38
- Label: Virgin EMI
- Songwriter(s): Kye Gibbon; Matthew Robson-Scott; Jonny Coffer; James Napier
- Producer(s): Gorgon City; Jonny Coffer

Gorgon City singles chronology
"Here for You" (2014)	"Unmissable" (2014)	"Go All Night" (2014)

Zak Abel singles chronology
"Higher" (2014)	"Unmissable" (2014)	"Wise Enough" (2015)

"Unmissable" is a song by English electronic music production duo Gorgon City. It features the vocals from Zak Abel. It was released on 28 August 2014 as a single from their debut studio album Sirens. The song was written by Kye Gibbon, Matthew Robson-Scott, Jonny Coffer, James Napier and produced by Gorgon City and Jonny Coffer. It peaked at No. 19 on the UK Singles Chart.

== Music video ==
A music video to accompany the release of "Unmissable" was first released onto YouTube on 28 August 2014 at a total length of three minutes and thirty-seven seconds.

== Charts ==
Chart (2014)	Peak position
Scotland (OCC)	16
UK Dance (OCC)	5
UK Singles (OCC)	19

== Release history ==
Region	Date	Format	Label
United Kingdom	28 September 2014	Digital download	Virgin EMI
