= Here for You (Gorgon City song) =

Single by Gorgon City featuring Laura Welsh

from the album Sirens
- Released: 15 June 2014
- Recorded: 2013
- Genre: House
- Length: 3:53
- Label: Virgin EMI
- Songwriters: Kye Gibbon; Matt Robson-Scott; Uzoechi Emenike; Laura Welsh
- Producer: Gorgon City

Gorgon City singles chronology
| "Ready for Your Love" (2014) | "Here for You" (2014) | "Unmissable" (2014) |

Laura Welsh singles chronology
| "Here for You" (2014) | "Betrayal" (2015) |

"Here for You" is a song by the English electronic music production duo Gorgon City, featuring vocals by the English singer Laura Welsh. It was released on 15 June 2014 as a single from their first studio album, Sirens. It entered the UK Singles Chart at number seven. The song also appears on the soundtrack of the 2014 racing video game Forza Horizon 2.

== Music video ==
The music video for the song was released on Gorgon City's YouTube channel on 20 May 2014, lasting three minutes and fifty-four seconds. By March 2016, it had received more than seven million views.

== Track listing ==
Digital download – single
| No. | Title | Length |
|---|---|---|
| 1. | "Here for You" (featuring Laura Welsh) | 3:53 |

Digital download – EP
| No. | Title | Length |
|---|---|---|
| 1. | "Here for You" (Bingo Players Remix) | 4:59 |
| 2. | "Here for You" (Roni Size Remix) | 4:31 |
| 3. | "Here for You" (Deetron Remix) | 6:56 |
| 4. | "Here for You" (Joel Compass Remix) | 3:22 |
| 5. | "Here for You" (Bearcubs Remix) | 4:51 |

German CD single
| No. | Title | Length |
|---|---|---|
| 1. | "Here for You" (featuring Laura Welsh) | 3:53 |
| 2. | "Ready For Your Love" (featuring MNEK) | 3:17 |

== Chart performance ==
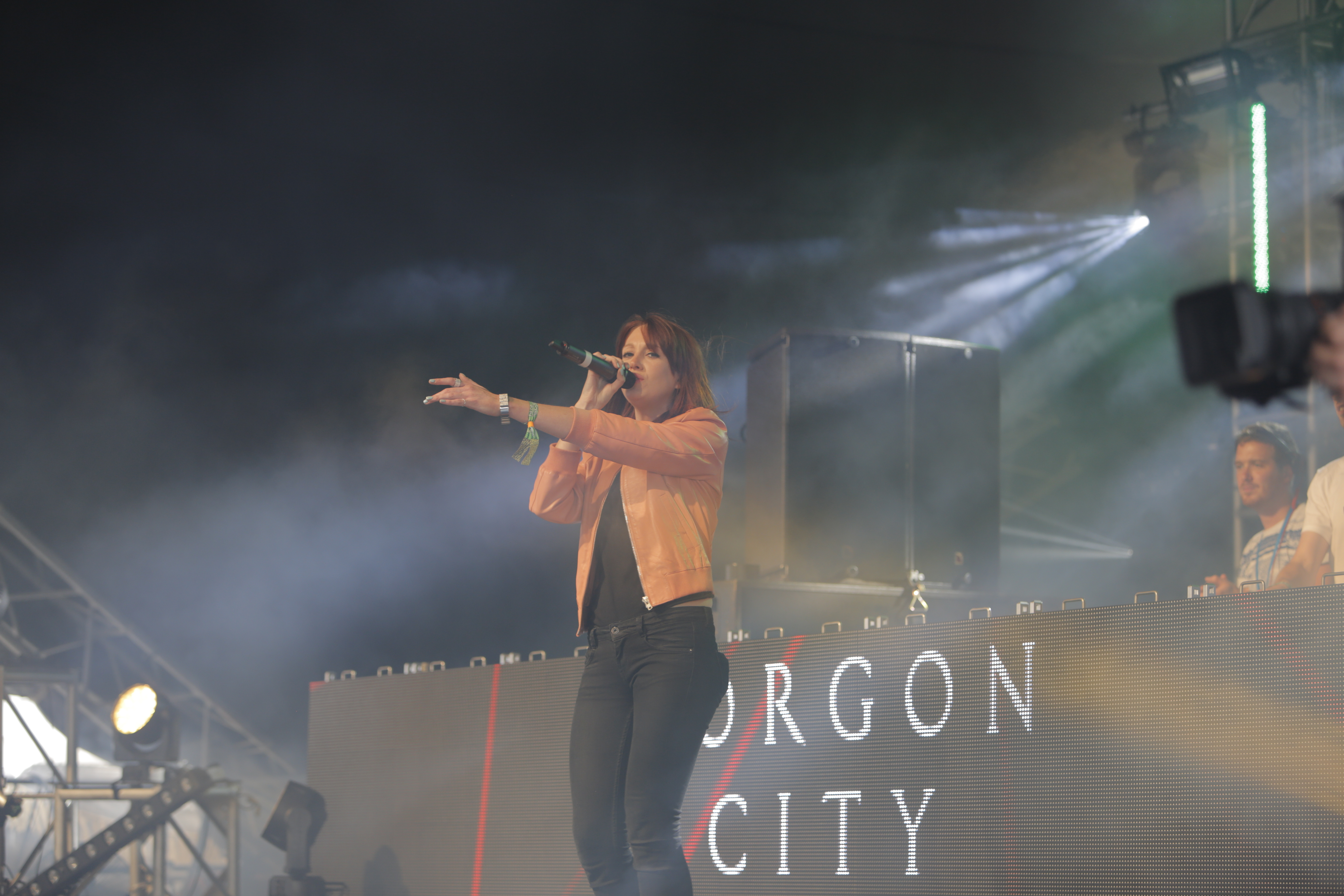
Laura Welsh and Gorgon City at Glastonbury Festival 2014

| Chart (2014) | Peak position |
|---|---|
| Belgium (Ultratip Bubbling Under Flanders) | 31 |
| Belgium (Ultratip Bubbling Under Wallonia) | 28 |
| Germany (GfK) | 48 |
| Scotland Singles (OCC) | 7 |
| UK Dance (OCC) | 2 |
| UK Singles (OCC) | 7 |

== Certifications ==
| Region | Certification | Certified units/sales |
|---|---|---|
| United Kingdom (BPI) | Silver | 200,000^{‡} |
^{‡} Sales+streaming figures based on certification alone.

== Release history ==
| Region | Date | Format | Label |
|---|---|---|---|
| United Kingdom | 15 June 2014 | Digital download | Virgin EMI |
| Germany | 18 July 2014 | Digital download | Universal |
| Germany | 1 August 2014 | CD single | Universal |
