= Voodoo doll (disambiguation) =

A voodoo doll, sometimes known as a Louisiana Voodoo doll, is a supposedly magical object associated with some forms of voodoo and folk magic.

Voodoo doll may also refer to:

== Film and TV ==
- Voodoo Dolls, a 1990 film starring Anik Matern
- Voodoo Dollz, a 2008 film directed by Fred Olen Ray

== Games and sports ==
- Voodoo Doll, a playable character in Pirates of the Caribbean: Dead Man's Chest (video game)
- New Orleans Voodoo Dolls, a team in the Women's American Football League

== Music ==
- "Voodoo Doll", a song by The Funeral Portrait from the album Greetings From Suffocate City
- "Voodoo Doll", a song by 5 Seconds of Summer, released in 2014
- "Voodoo Doll", a song by 12 Stones from Picture Perfect
- "Voodoo Doll", a song by Amelia, released in 1962
- "Voodoo Doll", a song by The Bamboos (funk band), released in 2004
- "Voodoo Doll", a song by Crazy Horse Saloon, released in 1972
- "Voodoo Doll", a song by Fergie from The Dutchess
- "Voodoo Doll", a song by Heart from Desire Walks On
- "Voodoo Doll", a song by Ray Johnson (singer), released in 1959
- "Voodoo Doll", a song by Soul Asylum from Say What You Will, Clarence... Karl Sold the Truck
- "Voodoo Doll", a song by VIXX from Voodoo (VIXX album)
- "Voodoo Doll", a song by Wild Cherry (band), released in 1975
