= Never Forget You (Zara Larsson and MNEK song) =

Single by Zara Larsson and MNEK

from the album So Good
- Released: 22 July 2015
- Genre: EDM; electropop
- Length: 3:33
- Label: TEN; Virgin EMI; Epic
- Songwriters: Uzoechi Emenike; Zara Larsson; Arron Davey
- Producers: MNEK; Astronomyy

Zara Larsson singles chronology
"Lush Life" (2015)	"Never Forget You" (2015)	"Girls Like" (2016)

MNEK singles chronology
"The Rhythm" (2015)	"Never Forget You" (2015)	"At Night (I Think About You)" (2016)

Music video
- "Never Forget You" on YouTube

"Never Forget You" is a song by Swedish singer-songwriter Zara Larsson and British singer-songwriter MNEK. It was released on 22 July 2015 in the United Kingdom by TEN Music Group, Virgin EMI and Epic as the second single from Larsson's second studio album So Good (2017).

The song peaked at number one in Larsson's home country as well as the top ten in eight additional countries, and became both Larsson and MNEK's first US entry on the Billboard Hot 100, peaking at number 13 on the chart dating 4 June 2016, becoming the best rank on the chart for Larsson at the time, and the best for MNEK to date. The single is certified platinum or higher in sixteen countries. An orchestral version of the song was later released on 21 May 2021 as a track off the Summer edition of Larsson's third studio album Poster Girl.

== Music video ==
The music video of "Never Forget You" was released on 17 September 2015. It features a girl who meets a creature, or makes up an imaginary friend (a large, friendly beast covered in shaggy black hair). It shows the girl growing up and always thinking about and spending time with the creature, or imaginary friend (played by Chris Fleming). The video was filmed in Iceland and was directed by Richard Paris Wilson.

== Cover versions ==
It was covered by the metalcore band Our Last Night.

== Track listing ==
Digital download
No.	Title	Length
1.	"Never Forget You"	3:33

Digital download – The Remixes EP
No.	Title	Length
1.	"Never Forget You" (MNEK VIP)	6:01
2.	"Never Forget You" (LuvBug Remix)	4:43
3.	"Never Forget You" (Bearcubs Remix)	4:05
4.	"Never Forget You" (Kove Remix)	4:13
5.	"Never Forget You" (Mr. Belt & Wezol Remix)	4:55
6.	"Never Forget You" (Ragz Originale Remix) (featuring Nick Brewer)	3:02

== Chart performance ==
=== Weekly charts ===
"Never Forget You" weekly chart performance
Chart (2015–2016)	Peak position
Australia (ARIA)	3
Austria (Ö3 Austria Top 40)	44
Belgium (Ultratop 50 Flanders)	9
Belgium (Ultratip Bubbling Under Wallonia)	11
Canada Hot 100 (Billboard)	15
Canada CHR/Top 40 (Billboard)	8
Canada Hot AC (Billboard)	45
CIS Airplay (TopHit)	147
Croatia (ARC Top 40)	20
Czech Republic Airplay (ČNS IFPI)	69
Czech Republic Singles Digital (ČNS IFPI)	20
Denmark (Tracklisten)	5
Euro Digital Song Sales (Billboard)	11
Finland (Suomen virallinen lista)	4
France (SNEP)	105
Germany (GfK)	20
Germany (Airplay Chart)	27
Hungary (Stream Top 40)	20
Ireland (IRMA)	15
Italy (FIMI)	52
Mexico Ingles Airplay (Billboard)	13
Netherlands (Dutch Top 40)	8
Netherlands (Single Top 100)	8
New Zealand (Recorded Music NZ)	6
Norway (VG-lista)	2
Poland Airplay (ZPAV)	43
Scottish Singles Sales (Official Charts)	12
Slovakia Airplay (ČNS IFPI)	45
Slovakia Singles Digital (ČNS IFPI)	18
Spain (PROMUSICAE)	92
Sweden (Sverigetopplistan)	1
Switzerland (Schweizer Hitparade)	32
UK Singles (Official Charts)	5
UK Dance (Official Charts)	1
US Billboard Hot 100	13
US Adult Pop Airplay (Billboard)	16
US Dance Airplay (Billboard)	13
US Hot Dance/Electronic Songs (Billboard)	1
US Pop Airplay (Billboard)	5
US Rhythmic Airplay (Billboard)	27

2026 weekly chart performance
Chart (2026)	Peak position
Sweden (Sverigetopplistan)	79
UK Dance (OCC)	33

=== Year-end charts ===
"Never Forget You" year-end chart performance
Chart (2015)	Position
Australia (ARIA)	65
Netherlands (Dutch Top 40)	95
Sweden (Sverigetopplistan)	47
UK Singles (Official Charts Company)	47

"Never Forget You" year-end chart performance
Chart (2016)	Position
Australia (ARIA)	87
Belgium (Ultratop Flanders)	75
Canada (Canadian Hot 100)	45
Germany (Official German Charts)	78
Netherlands (Dutch Top 40)	45
Netherlands (Single Top 100)	49
New Zealand (Recorded Music NZ)	42
Switzerland (Schweizer Hitparade)	65
UK Singles (Official Charts Company)	55
US Billboard Hot 100	46
US Hot Dance/Electronic Songs (Billboard)	6
US Mainstream Top 40 (Billboard)	30

=== Decade-end charts ===
"Never Forget You" decade-end chart performance
Chart (2010–2019)	Position
US Hot Dance/Electronic Songs (Billboard)	24

== Certifications ==
"Nevet Forget You" certifications
Region	Certification	Certified units/sales
Australia (ARIA)	5× Platinum	350,000^{‡}
Belgium (BRMA)	Platinum	20,000^{‡}
Brazil (Pro-Música Brasil)	2× Platinum	120,000^{‡}
Canada (Music Canada)	4× Platinum	320,000^{‡}
Denmark (IFPI Danmark)	2× Platinum	180,000^{‡}
Germany (BVMI)	Platinum	400,000^{‡}
Hungary (MAHASZ)	3× Platinum	9,000^{‡}
Italy (FIMI)	Platinum	50,000^{‡}
New Zealand (RMNZ)	4× Platinum	120,000^{‡}
Norway (IFPI Norway)	4× Platinum	240,000^{‡}
Poland (ZPAV)	2× Platinum	40,000^{‡}
Portugal (AFP)	Gold	10,000^{‡}
Spain (Promusicae)	Gold	30,000^{‡}
Sweden (GLF)	5× Platinum	200,000^{‡}
Switzerland (IFPI Switzerland)	Platinum	30,000^{‡}
United Kingdom (BPI)	3× Platinum	1,800,000^{‡}
United States (RIAA)	5× Platinum	5,000,000^{‡}
^{‡} Sales+streaming figures based on certification alone.

== Release history ==
Region	Date	Format	Label	Ref.
Worldwide	22 July 2015	Digital download	TEN; Virgin EMI; Epic	
United States	10 September 2015	Digital download	Epic	
United States	26 January 2016	Contemporary hit radio	Epic	
