= Language (MNEK album) =

Studio album by MNEK
- Released: 7 September 2018
- Recorded: 2015–2018
- Studios: Major Tom's (London, UK)
- Genres: Pop; dance pop; R&B
- Length: 46:00
- Label: Virgin EMI
- Producers: MNEK; Anton "Hightower" Rundberg; Tre Jean-Marie; Lophiile; Diztortion; Hal Ritson; NoiseClub

MNEK chronology
Small Talk EP (2015)	Language (2018)	Bulldozer!! (2026)

Singles from Language
- 1. "Paradise" Released: 12 July 2017; 2. "Tongue" Released: 28 February 2018; 3. "Colour" Released: 1 June 2018; 4. "Crazy World" Released: 16 August 2018; 5. "Correct" Released: 31 August 2018; 6. "Girlfriend" Released: 6 February 2019

Professional ratings
Aggregate scores
Source	Rating
Metacritic	68/100
Review scores
Source	Rating
Clash	6/10
DIY	3/5 stars
The Guardian	3/5 stars
The Line of Best Fit	8/10
MusicOMH	4.5/5 stars
NME	4/5 stars
Rolling Stone	2/5 stars

Language is the debut studio album by British singer-songwriter and record producer MNEK. It was released on 7 September 2018 through Virgin EMI Records and became his second solo project, succeeding his debut extended play Small Talk, released in 2015. Singles from Language include "Tongue", "Colour", "Correct" and "Girlfriend". The album's release was followed by a UK tour in 2018 and an American leg in 2019.

Language was received well by critics, with NME awarded Language four stars, as did The Line of Best Fit.

== Accolades ==
Accolades for Language
Publication	Accolade	Rank
Billboard	Billboard's 50 Best Albums of 2018	41
Idolator	Idolator's 25 Best Albums of 2018	12
MusicOMH	MusicOMH's 50 Best Albums of 2018	41
Paper	Paper's 20 Best Albums of 2018	15

== Track listing ==
Language track listing
No.	Title	Writer(s)	Producer(s)	Length
1.	"Background"	Uzoechi Emenike	MNEK	1:29
2.	"Correct"	Emenike	MNEK	3:55
3.	"Tongue"	Emenike; Julia Karlsson; Anton Rundberg	MNEK; Hightower	3:28
4.	"Gibberish (Interlude)"	Emenike; Ryan Campbell	MNEK	0:19
5.	"Phone"	Emenike	MNEK; Lophiile	3:23
6.	"Colour" (featuring Hailee Steinfeld)	Emenike; Raoul Chen; Anne-Marie Nicholson; Arthur Hamilton	MNEK; Diztortion	3:41
7.	"Body"	Emenike; Campbell	MNEK; TommyD^{[a]}	3:57
8.	"Honeymoon Phaze"	Emenike; Campbell	MNEK; Tre Jean-Marie; TommyD^{[a]}	5:32
9.	"Language"	Emenike	MNEK; Jean-Marie	1:04
10.	"Hearsay (Interlude)"	Emenike; Chimnezie Emenike	MNEK	0:15
11.	"Girlfriend"	Emenike; Campbell; Charles Jankel; Kenneth Young	MNEK	4:03
12.	"Paradise"	Emenike; Ultra Naté; Lem Springsteen; John Ciafone	MNEK; Hal Ritson; Springsteen^{[b]}; Ciafone^{[b]}	4:28
13.	"Crazy World"	Emenike; Rebecca Hill	MNEK	3:46
14.	"Be (Interlude)"	Emenike; Leo Kalyan	MNEK	0:17
15.	"Free"	Emenike; Campbell	MNEK	3:45
16.	"Touched by You"	Emenike; Zachary Poor; Robert McCurdy; Christopher Petrosino; Karlsson; Rundberg	MNEK; Hightower; NoiseClub; TommyD^{[a]}	3:18
Total length:				46:00

Notes

- ^{^[a]} signifies an additional producer.
- ^{^[b]} signifies an original producer.
- "Gibberish (Interlude)" features un-credited vocals from Ryan Ashley.
- "Correct" features un-credited vocals from Ryan Ashley, Tre Jean-Marie and Kate Stewart.
- "Colour" samples lyrical content from the song "The Rainbow Song", originally written by Arthur Hamilton.
- "Body" partially samples the album's previous track "Colour", featuring Hailee Steinfeld.
- "Hearsay (Interlude)" features un-credited vocals from Barto.
- "Girlfriend" samples the song "Ai No Corrida", originally performed and written by Chaz Jankel.
- "Paradise" samples the song "Free", originally performed and written by Ultra Naté.
