= Every Little Word (song) =

Single by MNEK

from the EP Small Talk
- Released: 21 April 2014
- Recorded: 2013
- Genre: Pop; R&B
- Length: 3:41
- Label: Virgin EMI
- Songwriter(s): Uzoechi Emenike; Quintin Christian
- Producer(s): MNEK; Quintin Christian

MNEK singles chronology
"Ready for Your Love" (2014)	"Every Little Word" (2014)	"Wrote a Song About You" (2014)

"Every Little Word" is a song by British singer MNEK. The song was released in the United Kingdom on 21 April 2014 as a digital download, as the lead single from his debut extended play Small Talk. The song peaked at number 184 on the UK Singles Chart.

== Music video ==
A music video to accompany the release of "Every Little Word" was first released onto YouTube on 25 April 2014 at a total length of three minutes and fifty-two seconds.

== Track listing ==
Digital download – single
No.	Title	Length
1.	"Every Little Word"	3:41

Digital download – EP
No.	Title	Length
1.	"Every Little Word" (Joe Goddard Remix)	7:17
2.	"Every Little Word" (Fred V & Grafix Remix)	4:51
3.	"Every Little Word" (abdi//dijon Remix)	3:27
4.	"Every Little Word" (Murci Remix)	4:34

== Charts ==
Chart (2014)	Peak position
UK Hip Hop/R&B (OCC)	36
UK Singles (Official Charts Company)	184

== Release history ==
Region	Date	Format	Label
United Kingdom	21 April 2014	Digital download	Virgin EMI
