= At Night (I Think About You) =

Single by MNEK
- Released: 13 May 2016
- Genre: EDM
- Length: 3:35
- Label: Virgin EMI
- Songwriter(s): Uzoechi Emenike; Ryan "Ashley" Campbell; Brayton Bowman
- Producer(s): MNEK

MNEK singles chronology
"Never Forget You" (2015)	"At Night (I Think About You)" (2016)	"House Work" (2016)

"At Night (I Think About You)" is a song by British singer MNEK. It was released on 13 May 2016, through Virgin EMI Records.

== Critical reception ==
"At Night (I Think About You)" received overall positive reviews from critics. Lewis Corner and Amy Davidson, from Digital Spy, said the track "thrives with its skittish beats and trickling synths, while MNEK's rich vocals cranks up with epic-ometer to full", and The Fader published that "Recent single 'At Night' has a radio-friendly beat drop and an age-old sentiment at its core."

Brennan Carley, from Spin, commented that "'At Night (I Think About You),' [is] a self-produced beauty of a tune that shows the utmost maturation in his craft" and that "MNEK sings with the slightest quiver over his icy, thrashing instrumentals".

== Track listing ==
Digital download
No.	Title	Length
1.	"At Night (I Think About You)"	3:35

== Charts ==
Chart (2016)	Peak position
Scotland (OCC)	79
Sweden Heatseeker (Sverigetopplistan)	15
UK Singles (OCC)	87
US Hot Dance/Electronic Songs (Billboard)	34
