= Wrote a Song About You =

Single by MNEK

from the EP Small Talk
- Released: 21 April 2014
- Recorded: 2013
- Genre: Dance-pop; house
- Length: 3:31
- Label: Virgin EMI
- Songwriter(s): Uzoechi Emenike
- Producer(s): MNEK

MNEK singles chronology
"Every Little Word" (2014)	"Wrote a Song About You" (2014)	"The Rhythm" (2015)

"Wrote a Song About You" is a song by British singer MNEK. The song was released in the United Kingdom on 21 April 2014 as a digital download, as the second single from his debut extended play Small Talk. The song peaked at number 66 on the UK Singles Chart.

== Music video ==
A music video to accompany the release of "Wrote a Song About You" was first released onto YouTube on 23 July 2014 at a total length of three minutes and thirty-two seconds.

== Track listing ==
Digital download – single
No.	Title	Length
1.	"Wrote a Song About You"	3:31

Digital download – EP
No.	Title	Length
1.	"Wrote a Song About You" (Kaytranada Edition)	5:06
2.	"Wrote a Song About You" (Shift K3Y Remix)	4:14
3.	"Wrote a Song About You" (TIEKS Remix)	6:10
4.	"Wrote a Song About You" (Leo Kalyan Remix)	4:37
5.	"Wrote a Song About You" (Extended Mix)	6:16

== Chart performance ==
=== Weekly charts ===
Chart (2014)	Peak position
Belgium (Ultratip Bubbling Under Flanders)	34
UK Hip Hop/R&B (OCC)	7
UK Singles (OCC)	66

== Release history ==
Region	Date	Format	Label
United Kingdom	21 April 2014	Digital download	Virgin EMI
