= Voodoo (Gorgon City song) =

Single by Gorgon City

from the album Salvation
- Released: 10 March 2023
- Genre: House; progressive house
- Length: 3:33
- Label: Positiva; EMI
- Songwriters: Kye Gibbon; Matthew Robson-Scott; Rosie Francis
- Producer: Gorgon City

Gorgon City singles chronology
| "Rumblah" (2023) | "Voodoo" (2023) | "Lost & Found" (2023) |

Music video
- "Voodoo" on YouTube

"Voodoo" is a song by English production duo Gorgon City, released as a single on 10 March 2023 through Positiva Records and EMI, serving as the lead single from their fourth studio album, Salvation.

== Composition ==
"Voodoo" is a house track with vocals over a prominent bassline.

== Reception ==
Dancing Astronaut's Alex Lambeau called the song "a bridge between [Gorgon City's] signature vocal-heavy sound and classic 808 drums" with layered vocals "over a disco-laced bassline" that could be "their next great club hit". Nina Chiang of EDMTunes also pointed out its "thumping bass line" and groove, remarking that it has "a more techno-driven rhythm". Katie Bain of Billboard named it one of the "5 dance tracks you need to hear this week" upon its release, calling it "an anthem about the alchemy of romance that balances prismatic vocals with a heady, sort of celestial progressive house production".

== Charts ==
Chart performance for "Voodoo"
| Chart (2023) | Peak position |
|---|---|
| UK Singles (OCC) | 87 |
| UK Dance (OCC) | 33 |

== Certifications ==
Certifications for "Voodoo"
| Region | Certification | Certified units/sales |
|---|---|---|
| United Kingdom (BPI) | Silver | 200,000^{‡} |
^{‡} Sales+streaming figures based on certification alone.
