= Brayton Bowman =

American singer-songwriter

- Born: Philadelphia, U.S.
- Education: Philadelphia High School for the Creative and Performing Arts; Berklee College of Music
- Genres: R&B
- Occupation: Singer-songwriter
- Years active: 2013–present
- Website: www.braytonbowman.com

Brayton Bowman is an American singer-songwriter. Born in Philadelphia, he attended the Philadelphia High School for the Creative and Performing Arts, where he studied classical and choral music and dabbled in musical theatre. After high school, he studied jazz at Berklee College of Music, then moved to New York City in February 2015, where he released the four-track EP HERE/NOW, leading to Spin Magazine naming him one of 5 Artists to Watch in May.

He is perhaps best known for his noirish cover of Britney Spears' chart-topping single "...Baby One More Time" in April 2015, which was remixed by DJ Wizza & OVSN, and a mashup of Justin Bieber’s "What Do You Mean?" and Drake's "Hotline Bling" in October of that year. Now based in Los Angeles, Bowman released a second EP, The Update, in August 2015.

Inspired by classic artists such as Stevie Wonder and Amy Winehouse, Bowman describes his sound as "somewhere in between soul-pop and future-funk".

The popular June 2016 video "Shy", by The Magician featuring Brayton Bowman, gained notoriety in part because of its bisexual imagery. Bowman's September 2016 single "What's Really Good" was produced by MNEK. He co-wrote MNEK's single "At Night I Think About You", released on Capitol Records UK in May 2016.

== Discography ==
=== Mixtapes ===
22 Minutes Later (2017)
No.	Title	Writer(s)	Producer(s)	Length
1.	"Worry Too Much (Intro)"	Brayton Bowman; Uzoechi Emenike	MNEK	2:09
2.	"Puff Puff Pass"	Bowman; Emenike; Tre Jean-Marie; Ryan Campbell	MNEK; Jean-Marie	3:46
3.	"WTF (Interlude)"	Bowman; Aminata Jamieson; Emenike; Campbell	Brayton Bowman	0:23
4.	"The Second I'm Rich"	Bowman; Emenike; Jean-Marie; Campbell	MNEK; Jean-Marie	3:31
5.	"What's Really Good?"	Bowman; Emenike; Campbell	MNEK	4:04
6.	"Kustom Made"	Bowman; Emenike; Jean-Marie; Campbell	MNEK	3:44
7.	"Broke n' Down (Interlude)"	Bowman; Emenike; Jean-Marie; Campbell	Bowman	0:13
8.	"Feel You"	Bowman; Emenike; Campbell	MNEK	4:07
Total length:				TBA

=== Extended plays ===
Here / Now (2015)
No.	Title	Writer(s)	Producer(s)	Length
1.	"Jaywalk"	Brayton Bowman; April Bender; Drew Moore	Moore	3:27
2.	"Runaway"			3:20
3.	"Stephen"			3:40
4.	"Ride or Die"			3:25
Total length:				TBA

The Update (2015)
No.	Title	Writer(s)	Producer(s)	Length
1.	"Skin Deep"	Brayton Bowman; Uzoechi Emenike; Tre Jean-Marie	MNEK; Jean-Marie	4:08
2.	"Real"	Bowman; Emenike; Ryan Campbell; Jacob Manson	MNEK; Manson	3:31
3.	"Play Me"	Emenike	MNEK	3:24
4.	"Side" (featuring Donna Simmal)	Bowman; Emenike; Donna Simmal	MNEK	3:32
Total length:				TBA

=== Singles ===
==== as lead artist ====
Title	Year	Album
"Runaway"	2015	Here / Now EP
"Skin Deep"	2015	The Update EP
"What's Really Good?"	2016	22 Minutes Later
"Puff Puff Pass"	2016	22 Minutes Later
"High & Low" (with West Coast Massive)	2018	High & Low

==== as featured artist ====
Title	Year	Album
"Shy" (The Magician featuring Brayton Bowman)	2016	Non-album single

=== Songwriting Credits ===
Title	Year	Artist(s)	Album	Credits	Written with
"At Night (I Think About You)"	2016	MNEK	Non-album single	Co-writer	Uzoechi Emenike, Ryan Campbell
"World to Me" (featuring MNEK or Luke James)	2017	Tchami	Revelations EP	Co-writer	Martin Besso, Uzoechi Emenike, Daniel Fite
"Wanna"	2019	Zara Larsson	TBA	Co-writer	Zara Larsson, Uzoechi Emenike, Georgia "Ku" Overton, Usher Raymond IV, Jermaine Dupri, Manuel Seal
