= Ready for Your Love =

Single by Gorgon City featuring MNEK

from the album Sirens
- Released: 26 January 2014
- Recorded: 2013
- Genre: Deep house; UK garage
- Length: 3:17
- Label: Virgin EMI; Black Butter
- Songwriters: Kye Gibbon; Matt Robson-Scott; Uzoechi Emenike
- Producers: Foamo; RackNRuin

Gorgon City singles chronology
"Intentions" (2013)	"Ready for Your Love" (2014)	"Here for You" (2014)

MNEK singles chronology
"Spoons" (2012)	"Ready for Your Love" (2014)	"Every Little Word" (2014)

"Ready for Your Love" is a song by English electronic music production duo Gorgon City featuring vocals from English singer MNEK. Released on 26 January 2014 as the second single from their debut studio album, Sirens (2014), it entered the UK Singles Chart at number four.

== Music video ==
The music video for the song was released onto Gorgon City's YouTube channel on 19 December 2013, lasting a total length of three minutes and twenty-eight seconds.

== Critical reception ==
Robert Copsey of Digital Spy reviewed the song positively and gave it a 3.5 out of 5 rating, saying "The track itself strips house back to basics, where synths are sprinkled over the verses only to be swept away for the looping chorus. Its simplicity allows fellow rising star MNEK to make his mark as the guest feature, his rich and distinctive vocal elevating an already uplifting track to new heights."

== Track listing ==
Digital download – single
No.	Title	Length
1.	"Ready for Your Love" (featuring MNEK)	3:17

Digital download – EP
No.	Title	Length
1.	"Ready for Your Love" (MNEK Refix)	4:09
2.	"Ready for Your Love" (Etherwood Remix)	5:51
3.	"Ready for Your Love" (CLOSE Remix)	6:35
4.	"Ready for Your Love" (CLOSE 'Ready for Your' Dub)	7:07
Total length:		23:42

== Personnel ==
- Kye "Foamo" Gibbon – producer, instruments
- Matt "RackNRuin" Robson-Scott – producer, instruments
- Uzoechi "MNEK" Emenike – vocals

== Charts ==
=== Weekly charts ===
Chart (2014)	Peak position
Belgium (Ultratip Bubbling Under Flanders)	2
Belgium Dance (Ultratop Flanders)	4
Belgium (Ultratip Bubbling Under Wallonia)	9
Europe (Euro Digital Songs)	5
Germany (GfK)	58
Iceland (Tonlist)	29
Netherlands (Mega Dance Top 30)	29
Netherlands (Single Top 100)	98
Romania (Airplay 100)	58
Scotland Singles (OCC)	7
Slovakia Airplay (ČNS IFPI)	77
UK Dance (OCC)	2
UK Singles (OCC)	4

=== Year-end charts ===
Chart (2014)	Position
UK Singles (Official Charts Company)	59

== Certifications ==
Region	Certification	Certified units/sales
United Kingdom (BPI)	Platinum	600,000^{‡}
^{‡} Sales+streaming figures based on certification alone.
