= Voodoo Child (comics) =

Comic book series published by Virgin Comics

- Cover to issue #1 of Voodoo Child (March 2007). Art by Ben Templesmith.

Publication information
- Publisher: Virgin Comics
- Schedule: Monthly
- Format: Limited series
- Genre: Horror
- Publication date: July – December 2007
- No. of issues: 6

Creative team
- Created by: Nicolas Cage; Weston Coppola Cage
- Written by: Mike Carey
- Artist: Dean Hyrapiet

Collected editions
- Hardcover: ISBN 0-9814808-0-2
- Softcover: ISBN 1934413135

Voodoo Child is a comic book limited series published by Virgin Comics, and created by Nicolas Cage and his son Weston Coppola Cage.

The series is written by Mike Carey with art by Dean Hyrapiet. The cover for the premiere issue was created by Ben Templesmith.

== Synopsis ==
The story revolves around the post-Katrina setting of New Orleans, and features Voodoo mythology. The son of a Unionist sympathizer is resurrected at his dying breath by the power of a Voodoo priest in the 1800s. In 2005 New Orleans, Detective Robert Julien tries to solve the mystery of why several young girls have disappeared.

== Collected editions ==
The series has been collected into a single volume:

- Voodoo Child (144 pages, softcover, February 2008, ISBN 1-934413-13-5, hardcover, May 2008, ISBN 0-9814808-0-2)
