= Gorgon City =

English electronic music duo

- Gorgon City in 2014

Background information
- Origin: North London, England
- Genres: House; electronic; UK garage
- Years active: 2012–present
- Labels: Priority; Virgin EMI; Black Butter; Positiva; Realm
- Members: Kye "Foamo" Gibbon; Matt "RackNRuin" Robson-Scott
- Website: gorgoncity.com

Gorgon City are an English electronic music production duo consisting of two North London producers Kye "Foamo" Gibbon and Matt "RackNRuin" Robson-Scott. Their 2014 singles "Ready for Your Love" and "Here for You" reached the top 10 in the UK. They are currently signed to the UK-based record label Positiva Records which is a division of Universal Music Group.

== Music career ==
=== 2012–2013: Real EP ===
The duo's first collaboration The Crypt EP, featuring Navigator, Rubi Dan, and Janai, was released on 27 February 2012. One year later, on 17 February 2013, they collaborated with Yasmin for the lead track of the Real EP. The song peaked at number 44 on the UK Singles Chart and number 7 on the UK Indie Chart.

=== 2013–2014: Sirens ===
On 12 May 2013, they released "Intentions", featuring Clean Bandit. On 26 January 2014, they released "Ready for Your Love" featuring MNEK. The song is their highest-charting song to date, entering the UK Singles Chart at number four. On 23 March 2014, they released "There Is No Other Time", a collaborative single with indie rock group Klaxons. On 26 May 2014, they released "Here for You", the third single from their debut studio album. The song entered the UK Singles Chart at number seven. They produced Jess Glynne's single "Right Here", which was released on 6 July 2014. They remixed the song "Back 2 the Wild" by Basement Jaxx in August 2014 for the album Junto. The fourth single from their debut studio album, "Unmissable", premiered on MistaJam's 1Xtra show on 21 July 2014. The song entered the UK Singles Chart at number nineteen. The album, Sirens was released on 6 October 2014 and peaked at number 10 on the UK Albums Chart. A compilation album alongside Pete Tong, entitled All Gone Pete Tong and Gorgon City Miami 2015, was released on 22 March 2015. The compilation features two exclusive tracks from Gorgon City: "Sky High" and "The Terminal".

=== 2015–present: Escape ===
Escape is Gorgon City's second studio album, released on 10 August 2018. Revealed collaborations on the album were to be Vaults, Duke Dumont, Naations, Kamille, Ghosted, and D Double E.

At the beginning of 2015, shortly after releasing the last single from their debut studio album Sirens, "Go All Night" featuring vocals from Jennifer Hudson, they released a new single, which was called "Saving My Life", featuring vocals from musician Romans. This sparked much interest about the pair making more material for a second studio album.

A year later, in April 2016, they released the official audio of the lead single "All Four Walls", featuring vocals from British band Vaults. After releasing the single, the pair confirmed that their second studio album is to be titled Escape. Afterwards, "Impaired Vision", featuring vocals from Tink and Mikky Ekko was released. In between releasing the singles, promotional singles were also released: "Blue Parrot", "Doubts", and "Smoke". "Zoom Zoom" was released, featuring vocals from Wyclef Jean.

== Discography ==
=== Studio albums ===
Title	Album details	Peak chart positions			Certifications
Title	Album details	UK	UK Dance	BEL (Fl)	Certifications
Sirens	Released: 6 October 2014; Format: Download, LP, CD; Label: Virgin EMI, Black Butter	10	1	112	BPI: Gold
Escape	Released: 10 August 2018; Format: Download, LP, CD; Label: Virgin EMI	45	4	—	
Olympia	Released: 25 June 2021; Format: Download, LP, CD; Label: Virgin EMI	26	1	—	
Salvation	Released: 21 July 2023; Format: Download, LP, CD; Label: Positiva, EMI	—	1	—	
Reverie	Released: 19 July 2024; Format: Download, LP; Label: Positiva, EMI	—	1	—	
Aether	Released: 13 November 2026; Format: Download, LP; Label: REALM Records	—	6	—	
"—" denotes an album that did not chart or was not released.

=== Extended plays ===
Title	EP details
The Crypt	Released: 27 February 2012; Format: Digital download; Label: Black Butter
Real	Released: 17 February 2013; Format: Digital download, CD; Label: Black Butter
Money	Released: 27 May 2016; Format: Digital download; Label: Crosstown Rebels
Grooves on the Vinyl	Released: 1 December 2017; Format: Digital download; Label: A Realm Records
Realm	Released: 4 December 2020; Format: Digital download; Label: A Realm Records

=== Singles ===
Title	Year	Peak chart positions									Certifications	Album
Title	Year	UK	UK Dance	BEL	GER	IRE	NL	SCO	US Dance Club	US Dance Elec.	Certifications	Album
"Real" (featuring Yasmin)	2013	44	9	30	—	—	—	—	—	—		Sirens
"Intentions" (featuring Clean Bandit)	2013	—	—	138	—	—	—	—	—	—		Non-album single
"Ready for Your Love" (featuring MNEK)	2014	4	2	52	58	41	98	7	—	—	BPI: Platinum	Sirens
"Here for You" (featuring Laura Welsh)	2014	7	2	62	48	86	—	7	—	—	BPI: Silver	Sirens
"Unmissable" (featuring Zak Abel)	2014	19	5	71	—	—	—	16	—	—		Sirens
"Go All Night" (featuring Jennifer Hudson)	2014	14	2	72	—	—	—	13	1	15	BPI: Silver	Sirens
"Imagination" (featuring Katy Menditta)	2015	194	39	76	—	—	—	—	—	—	BPI: Silver	Sirens
"Saving My Life" (featuring RØMANS)	2015	92	22	97	—	—	—	—	—	—		Non-album single
"All Four Walls" (featuring Vaults)	2016	85	21	—	—	—	—	—	10	29	BPI: Gold	Escape
"Real Life" (with Duke Dumont featuring Naations)	2017	31	9	67	—	70	—	31	—	—	BPI: Gold	Escape
"Go Deep" (with Kamille and Ghosted)	2018	—	—	—	—	—	—	—	—	—		Escape
"Hear That" (featuring D Double E)	2018	—	—	—	—	—	—	—	—	—		Escape
"One Last Song" (featuring JP Cooper and Yungen)	2018	—	—	—	—	—	—	—	—	—		Escape
"Let It Go" (featuring Naations)	2018	—	—	—	—	—	—	—	—	—		Escape
"Go Slow" (with Kaskade and Roméo)	2019	—	—	—	—	—	—	—	1	22		Non-album singles
"There for You" (with MK)	2019	99	19	—	—	—	—	—	1	14	BPI: Silver	Non-album singles
"Baggage" (with Gryffin and AlunaGeorge)	2019	—	—	—	—	—	—	—	—	32		Gravity
"Nobody" (with Drama)	2020	—	—	93	—	—	—	—	—	—		Olympia
"House Arrest" (with Sofi Tukker)	2020	—	—	72	—	—	88	—	—	21		Olympia
"Free Myself" (with Yousef featuring Evabee)	2020	—	—	—	—	—	—	—	—	—		Non-album single
"Burning" (featuring Evan Giia)	2020	—	—	—	—	—	—	—	—	—		Olympia
"Alive" (with Pax)	2020	—	—	—	—	—	—	—	—	—		Non-album single
"You've Done Enough" (with Drama)	2021	70	23	—	—	—	—	—	—	30	BPI: Silver	Olympia
"Foolproof" (with Hayden James and Nat Dunn)	2021	—	—	—	—	—	—	—	—	—		Olympia
"Tell Me It's True"	2021	—	—	—	—	—	—	—	—	—		Olympia
"Never Let Me Down" (with Hayley May)	2021	—	—	—	—	—	—	—	—	—		Olympia
"Dreams" (with Jem Cooke)	2021	—	—	—	—	—	—	—	—	—		Olympia
"Voodoo"	2023	87	33	—	—	—	—	×	—	—	BPI: Silver	Salvation
"Lost & Found" (with Drama)	2023	—	—	—	—	—	—	×	—	—		Salvation
"Biggest Regret" (featuring Bbyafricka)	2024	—	—	—	—	—	—	×	—	—		Reverie
"You Know It"	2024	—	—	—	—	—	—	×	—	—		Reverie
"All That You Need" (featuring Caroline Byrne)	2024	—	—	—	—	—	—	×	—	—		Reverie
"One New Change"	2024	—	—	—	—	—	—	×	—	—		Reverie
"Breathe You In" (featuring North)	2024	—	—	—	—	—	—	×	—	—		Reverie
"5AM at Bagleys"	2025	—	—	—	—	—	—	×	—	—		Aether
"Run It Back" (featuring Caroline Byrne)	2025	—	—	—	—	—	—	×	—	—		Non-album singles
"Loveless"	2025	—	38	—	—	—	—	×	—	—		Non-album singles
"Mitsubishi" (featuring Muki)	2025	—	—	—	—	—	—	×	—	—		Non-album singles
"Second Nature" (featuring Taet)	2026	—	—	—	—	—	—	×	—	—		Non-album singles
"Work It Out"	2026	—	—	—	—	—	—	×	—	—		Aether
"Oracle" (featuring Jem Cooke)	2026	—	—	—	—	—	—	×	—	—		Aether
"Only Love" (featuring Caroline Byrne)	2026	—	—	—	—	—	—	×	—	—		Aether
"—" denotes a single that did not chart or was not released.

=== Promotional singles ===
Title	Year	Peak chart positions	Album
Title	Year	US Dance Club	Album
"The Crypt" (featuring Navigator and Rubi Dan)	2012	—	Non-album single
"Lover Like You" (featuring Katy B)	2014	—	Sirens
"Blue Parrot"	2016	—	Non-album singles
"Impaired Vision" (featuring Tink and Mikky Ekko)	2016	—	Non-album singles
"Doubts"	2016	—	Non-album singles
"Smoke"	2016	—	Non-album singles
"Zoom Zoom" (featuring Wyclef Jean)	2016	—	Non-album singles
"Smile" (featuring Elderbrook)	2016	35	Non-album singles
"Primal Call"	2017	—	Non-album singles
"Motorola"	2018	—	Non-album singles
"Lick Shot"	2019	—	Non-album singles
"Delicious"	2019	—	Non-album singles
"Elizabeth Street"	2019	—	Realm
"Roped In"	2019	—	Realm

=== Production credits ===
Song	Year	Artist	Album
"Right Here"	2014	Jess Glynne	I Cry When I Laugh
"Blood on My Hands"	2015	Chris Brown	Royalty International – EP
"Nothing Really Matters"	2020	Tiesto, Becky Hill	The London Sessions

=== Remixes ===
Song	Year	Artist
"Get By"	2012	Delta Heavy
"We've Only Just Begun"	2012	Michael Woods (featuring Ester Dean)
"For My Sins"	2012	Jess Mills
"Nightingale"	2012	Clean Bandit
"Back 2 the Wild"	2013	Basement Jaxx
"First Day"	2013	Walden
"Hideaway"	2014	Kiesza
"Knock You Out"	2014	Bingo Players
"Say You Love Me"	2014	Jessie Ware
"Hopelessly Coping"	2015	Wilkinson (featuring Thabo)
"Sacred Dance of the Demon"	2016	Damian Lazarus & The Ancient Moons
"I Would Like"	2016	Zara Larsson
"Blame"	2017	Zeds Dead & Diplo (featuring Elliphant)
"Blackbird"	2017	Joeski
"Know My Ting"	2017	Ghetts (featuring Shakka)
"Say Less"	2017	Dillon Francis (featuring G-Eazy)
"Hell to the Liars"	2017	London Grammar
"Feel My Needs"	2018	Weiss
"Poseidon"	2019	Local Dialect
"Deeper"	2019	Todd Edwards and Sinden
"Lie Machine"	2019	Davi
"Moving Blind"	2020	Sonny Fodera and Dom Dolla
"Lie For You"	2020	Snakehips (featuring A Boogie Wit Da Hoodie and Davido)
"So Hooked on Your Love"	2020	Selace
"Sacrifice"	2021	Bebe Rexha
"Cosmic Kiss"	2021	Pax
"Somebody To Love"	2022	Ben Kim
"State Of Mind"	2022	Mephisto
"Where You Are"	2023	John Summit and Hayla
"Jump n' Shout"	2026	Basement Jaxx
