= MNEK =

British singer (born 1994)

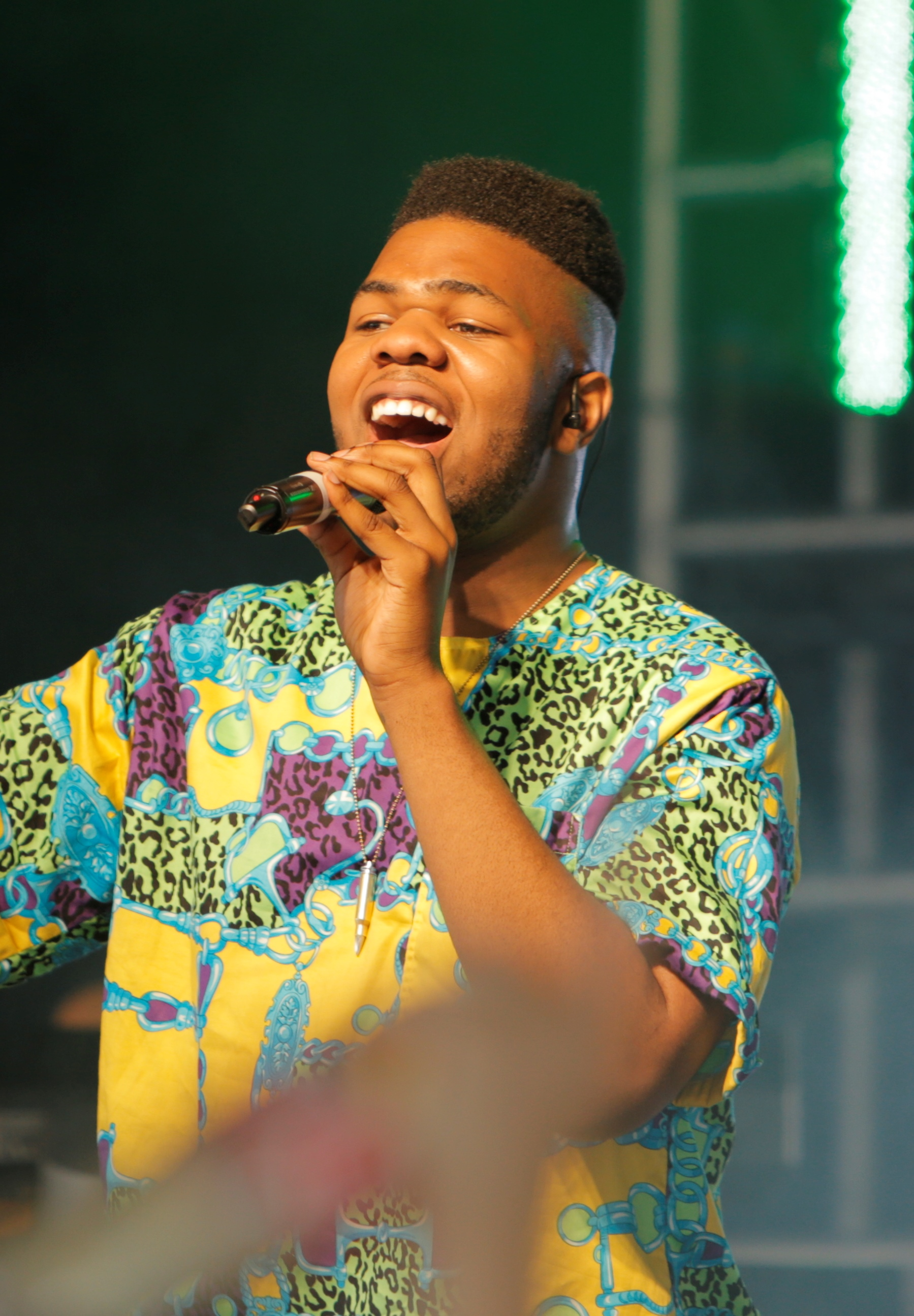
- MNEK performing at Glastonbury Festival 2014

Background information
- Also known as: Uzo Emenike
- Born: Uzoechi Osisioma Emenike; 9 November 1994 (age 31); Lewisham, London, England
- Origin: Bellingham, London, England
- Genres: Pop; dance-pop; house; UK garage; R&B
- Occupations: Singer; songwriter; record producer
- Instrument: Vocals
- Years active: 2011–present
- Labels: Capitol; Virgin EMI; Moshi Moshi; Polydor
- Website: mnekofficial.com

Uzoechi Osisioma "Uzo" Emenike (/ˈuːzoʊtʃi ˌɛməˈniːkeɪ/ OO-zoh-chee EM-ə-NEE-kay; born 9 November 1994), professionally known by his (Note: MNEK uses he/him, she/her and they/them pronouns and switches between them; this article uses he/him pronouns for consistency.) stage name MNEK (a gramogram of "Emenike"), is a British singer, songwriter and record producer. He has been nominated for two Grammy Awards and a Brit Award, and has received the ASCAP Vanguard Award. His writing and production credits include H.E.R., Jax Jones, Zara Larsson, Little Mix, Dua Lipa, Flo, Sugababes, Clean Bandit, Julia Michaels, Måneskin, Craig David, Christina Aguilera, Becky Hill, Joel Corry, Selena Gomez, Years & Years, Kid Cudi, Kylie Minogue, Beyoncé, Hailee Steinfeld, Madonna, KSI, Mabel and Twice.

== Career ==
=== 2011–2013: Breakthrough ===
In an interview with Build LDN, MNEK talked about his introduction into the music industry and how, at first, he did not even know what a publisher was. He stated, "I started writing poems and writing songs around the age of 8 or 7 and I started playing around with production software from really young as well. I then put some stuff up on Myspace finally when I was 14. There were two songs I had. I sent them out to all my favourite artists on Myspace and it just landed on this artist at the time called CocknBullKid, but she's now Anita Blay and she's an amazing songwriter. She was like "Okay, cool. I'm just gonna send this to my publisher" and at the time I had no idea what a publisher was. So she sent it and that was that and it became this flurry of people wanting to be my publisher and then that was me in the industry, but then I've had to grow in the industry at the same time – I've been learning on the job – because I was still in school and all that stuff. I was managing how to work that around it because my parents weren't gonna let me leave school."

In 2011, when he was 17 years old, he began writing and working with production group Xenomania and contributed to Florrie's 2011 extended play Experiments, which first labelled him professionally as a songwriter. Shortly after, his work with Xenomania earned him his break out when he worked with top acts the Saturdays and the Wanted. He also released his debut single "If Truth Be Told" in November of that year.

In 2012, he worked with singer and songwriter A*M*E on her debut single "City Lights", featuring MNEK's brother Bartoven, and she became one of MNEK's first affiliates. In February, he was labelled as a featured performer on Rudimental's single "Spoons", alongside Syron. The song features on their 2013 debut album Home, where he also featured on the song "Baby" alongside Sinead Harnett, and also worked on the songs "Hell Could Freeze" and "Hide".

In 2013, MNEK contributed to the song "Need U (100%)", featuring A*M*E, and became his biggest contribution since working with the Saturdays. He was also labelled one of 15 artists to make BBC's Sound of 2014 long list.

=== 2014–2015: Small Talk ===
In January 2014, he featured on Gorgon City's single "Ready for Your Love". The song peaked at number 4 on the UK Singles Chart. On 20 April 2014, he premiered "Every Little Word" on 1Xtra, a single from his debut studio album. On 9 May 2014, the remix EP, featuring Joe Goddard and Fred V & Grafix among others was released. Emenike has said we can expect to hear collaborations with Moko, Snakehips and Jimmy Napes on the record. The lead single "Wrote a Song About You" premiered on Annie Mac's BBC Radio 1 show on 13 June 2014. In June 2014, Oliver Heldens' track "Gecko (Overdrive)", which MNEK wrote, debuted at number one on both the UK Dance Chart and the UK Singles Chart. In 2014, he also worked with Madonna on her album Rebel Heart, and produced the song "Feels So Good" by Kylie Minogue, from her album Kiss Me Once. On 22 July 2014, MNEK released the promotional single "In Your Clouds" as part of an iTunes Ones to Watch campaign. The song will feature on his debut studio album. His debut extended play (EP) Small Talk was released on 20 March 2015. In March 2015, JoJo announced that she worked with MNEK on her new studio album.

In July 2015, MNEK released "Never Forget You" with Swedish singer Zara Larsson. The single premiered as Annie Mac's Hottest Record on BBC Radio 1 and to date has been certified Platinum in the UK, 3× Platinum in Sweden, 2× Platinum in Australia and Denmark and Platinum in Norway. In the US, "Never Forget You" has been certified Platinum, reaching the number one spot on the Billboard Dance/Electronic Songs chart for three consecutive weeks and the top 10 of the national airplay chart.

=== 2016–present: Songwriting breakthrough and Language ===
After the success of his Zara Larsson collaboration, he began working with other artists as a songwriter, beginning with his contribution to Beyoncé's 2016 song "Hold Up". He also went on to form songwriting partnerships with artists including Becky Hill, Leo Kalyan, Shift K3Y, Ryan Ashley, Jax Jones, and Brayton Bowman.

In 2016, he released his first solo single since his debut extended play, entitled "At Night (I Think About You)". Shortly after, he also released a cover of the renowned Queen single "Don't Stop Me Now". "At Night (I Think About You)" peaked at number 87 on the UK Singles Chart. After releasing the song, he stated that he was recording and producing his debut album.

In 2017, he released another single, entitled "Paradise", which samples Ultra Naté's 1997 hit "Free", as well as the collaborative single "Deeper" with Riton and the House Gospel Choir.

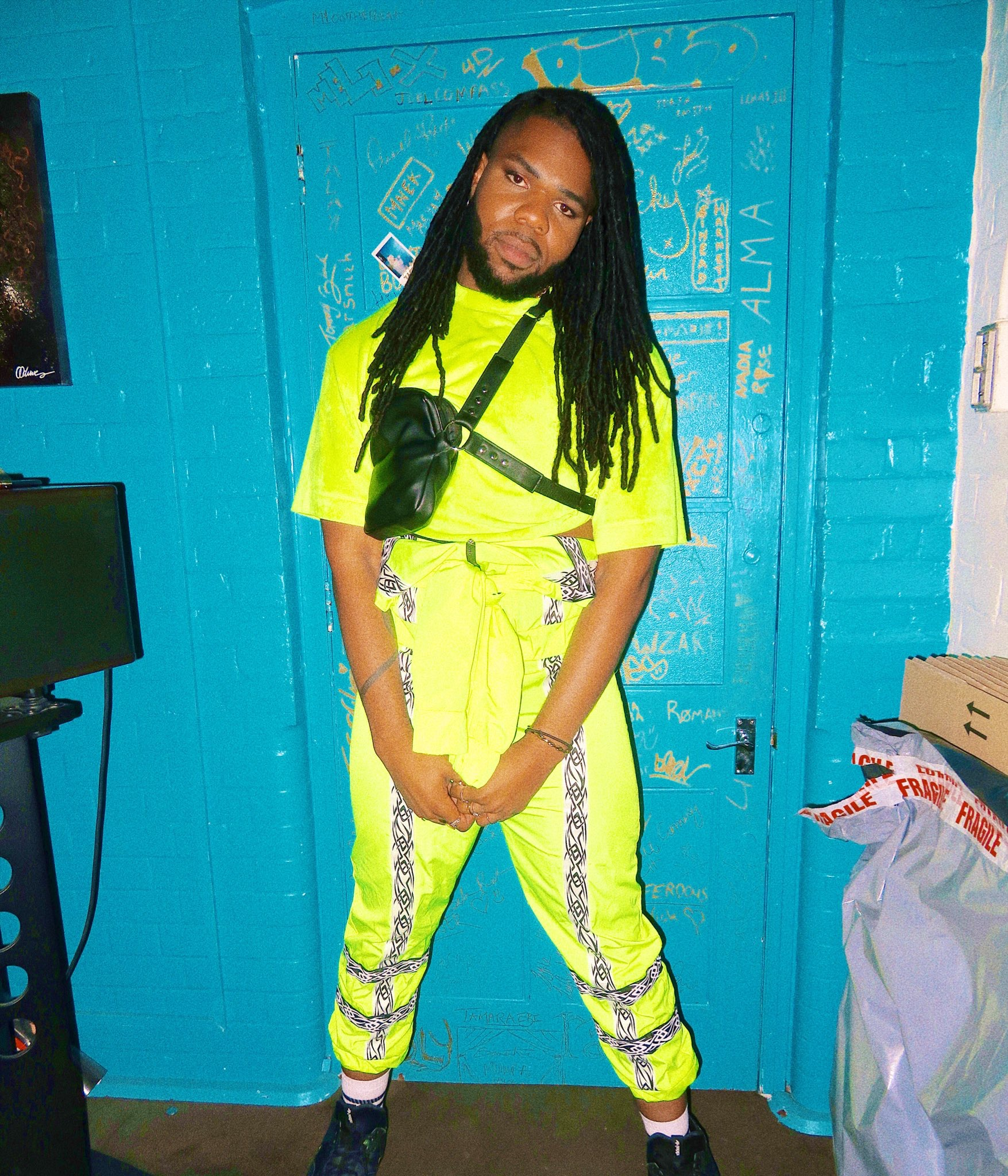
MNEK backstage in 2019

In February 2018, he teased the single "Tongue", which was revealed to be the lead single from his debut album, Language. He stated in an interview with Annie Mac that his album was finished and that he was mixing the album with mixing engineer Phil Tan. It was released on 7 September 2018.

In July 2019, MNEK hosted a songwriting camp for LGBT singer-songwriters in association with Pride in Music. The aim of the camp was to help emerging LGBT talent find a safe space to work in, as MNEK himself has experienced judgment from within the industry due to his sexual orientation. Participants in the event included L Devine, Olly Alexander, and Rina Sawayama.

In 2020, MNEK collaborated with Joel Corry on the song "Head & Heart", which peaked at number one on the Official UK Charts, marking his first as a featured artist.

In 2021, MNEK appeared as a guest vocal coach on the second series of RuPaul's Drag Race UK. On 11 May 2021, the Sugababes released a reworking of 2001 single "Run for Cover" featuring MNEK to celebrate the 20th anniversary of their debut album One Touch and plans for new music.

In June 2021, it was announced that MNEK would be appearing alongside Olly Alexander on the third series of Celebrity Gogglebox which airs on Channel 4. In 2022, MNEK produced a number of tracks on Island Records new girl group Flo EP The Lead, including singles "Cardboard Box" and "Immature". On 4 February 2022, he collaborated with Jax Jones on the single "Where Did You Go?". The song peaked at number 7 in the UK and has since been certified Platinum by the British Phonographic Industry. In November, MNEK teamed up with Galantis and David Guetta on the song "Damn (You've Got Me Saying)". "Radio", the collaboration with Sigala, was released in January 2023. The same year he released another 2 songs, "16 Again" with Paul Woolford and Lewis Thompson and "Oh The Glamour" with Aluna, Pabllo Vittar and Eden Prince.

MNEK has produced multiple songs for Flo, including "Cardboard Box", "Immature", "Summertime" and "Feature Me".

On 2 February 2024, MNEK announced his newfound label called MuzoByUz, with its first artist being Tyler Lewis..

In 2025, MNEK collaborated with Zara Larsson on her fifth studio album "Midnight Sun". He also collaborated with Larsson on "Stateside + Zara Larsson", which was released as a single from "Fancy Some More?", the third remix album by the British singer-songwriter and record producer PinkPantheress.

== Personal life ==
Emenike came out as gay when he was 19. Emenike has established a songwriting camp for LGBTQ+ singer-songwriters in association with Pride in Music, which collaborates with other influential artists like Rina Sawayama. He wants to reach out to young adults figuring out their sexuality.

== Discography ==
- Language (2018)
- Bulldozer!! (2026)
