= Lake Abant National Park =

National park in Turkey

- Abant Gölü Milli Parkı
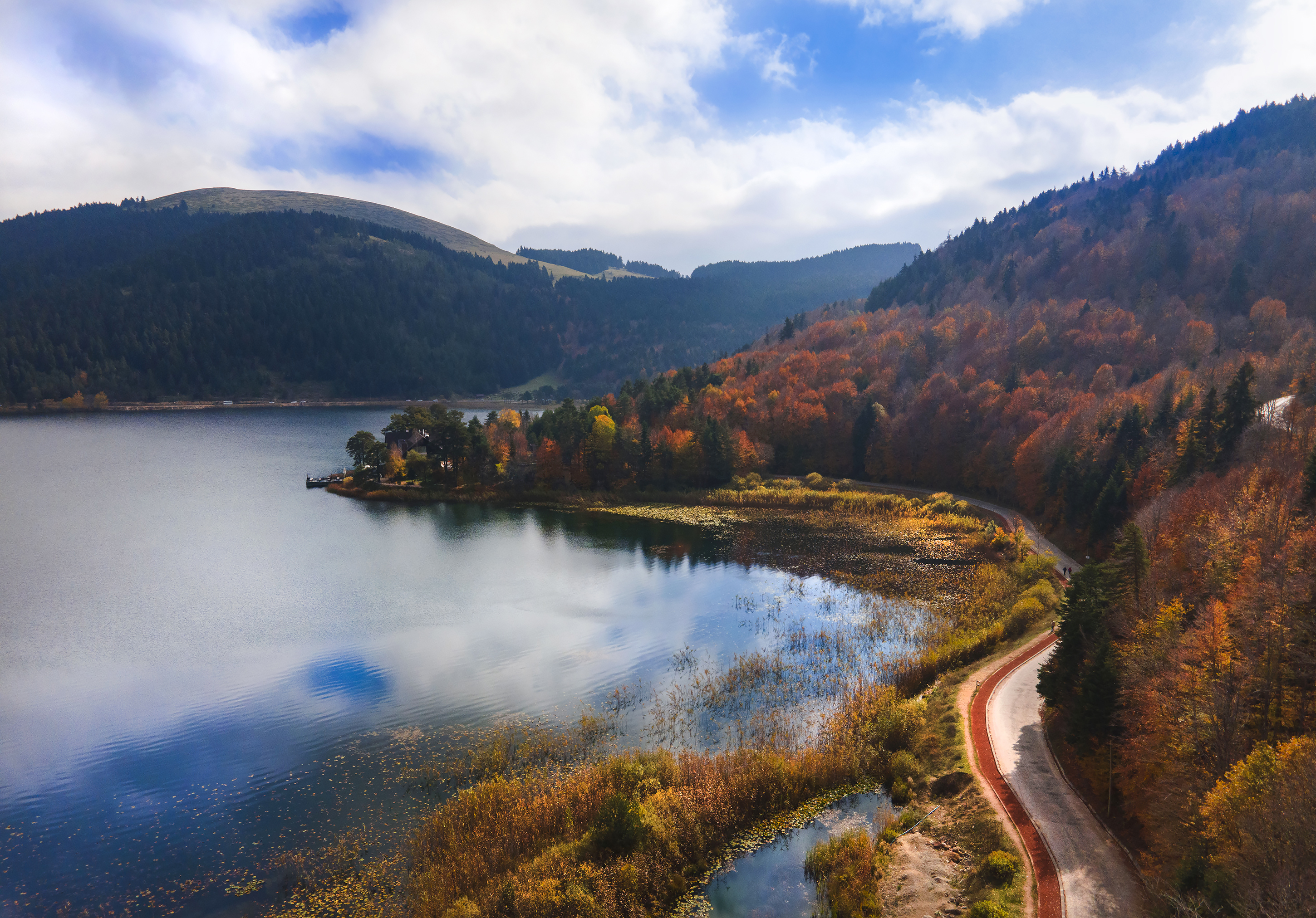
- Aerial view of Lake Abant National Park

- Location within Turkey
- Location: Bolu Province, Turkey
- Nearest city: Mudurnu
- Coordinates: 40°36′N 31°16′E
- Area: 127 ha (310 acres)
- Elevation: 1,328 m (4,357 ft)
- Established: 10 June 2022; 4 years ago
- Governing body: Directorate-General of Nature Protection and National Parks; Mimistry of Agriculture and Forestry

Lake Abant National Park (Turkish: Abant Gölü Milli Parkı), established on 10 June 2022, is the 48th national park in Turkey. It is located in Mudurnu district of Bolu Province, northwestern Anatolia.

== Overview ==
The Lake Abant is a crater-barrier lake on the Abant Mountains. The lake is situated at an elevation of 1,328 m (4,357 ft). Fed by groundwater, it has a surface area of 127 ha (310 acres) with a 7 km (4.3 mi)-long shoreline, and is 18 m (59 ft) deep. The Lake Abant is located 34 km (21 mi) southwest of Bolu.

== National park ==
The Lake Abant and the surrounding area covering 1,196.5 ha (2,957 acres) was protected as a natural park in 1988. It was declared the 48th national park in Turkey on 10 June 2022. The national park is administered by the Directorate-General of Nature Protection and National Parks at Ministry of Agriculture and Forestry.

The Lake Abant National Park is located between the branches of the Abant and Keremali mountain ranges, which form the second branch of the Western Black Sea mountain range parallel to the Black Sea coast. Within the park area, there are many hills with elevation between 1,400–1,700 m (4,600–5,600 ft).

=== Flora ===
The national park is rich in vegetation. Scots pine, larch, beech, oak, poplar, ash, hornbeam, willow, juniper trees and rhododendron, tamarisk, hazelnut, medlar, parsnip, hawthorn, holly, rosehip, fern, blackberry, strawberry, mint, raspberry, ivy, nettle, horsetail and meadow grasses form the main trees and shrubs. The shores of Lake Abant are full of various aquatic plants and water lilies. Abant Crocus (Crocus abantensis) can be found on the slopes rising around the lake.

=== Fauna ===
The endemic species found in the lake and its surroundings are the Little Scalloped Salamander (Triturus vulgaris kosswigii), the Abant Trout (Salmo Trutta Fario Varyette Abanticus) and the Abant Hazel Mouse (Muscardinus Avellanarius Abanticus). Angling is permitted by fee payment in certain seasonal times. Otters can be seen around the lakesides.

In the forests around the lake, wild animals are found such as fox, jackal, wolf, bear, wild boar, deer, roe deer, rabbit, squirrel and weasel.

The park area is also home to bird species such as water birds, wild goose, wild duck, heron, coot, cormorant, crane, predator hawk, falcon, black vulture, golden eagle, hawk, owl and other bird species; lark, jackdaw, eagle owl, peregrine falcon, woodpecker, blackbird, nightingale, finch and goldfinch.

=== Activities ===
Activities offered in the national park are nature museum visit, picnic around the lake, camping, sport angling, hiking, cycling, horse-drawn carriage riding, horseback riding, paragliding in Çepni Plateau.

=== Food and lodging ===
There are picnic areas and restaurants in the park area. Local food like trout and sausage sandwich are offered in the park area and on the way to the national park.

Two five-star accommodation facilities, bungalow-type accommodation units and camping sites around the lake are available. On the road to the national park, there are also hostels.

=== Access ===
The national park can be reached by a 22 km (14 mi) road departing from the highway D-100 or the motorway O-4 between Ankara and Istanbul. It is 34 km (21 mi) far from Bolu, 225 km (140 mi) from Ankara and 258 km (160 mi) from Istanbul away. Public buses serve the national park from the city center of Bolu every two hours.
