= Mudurnu =

- Municipality
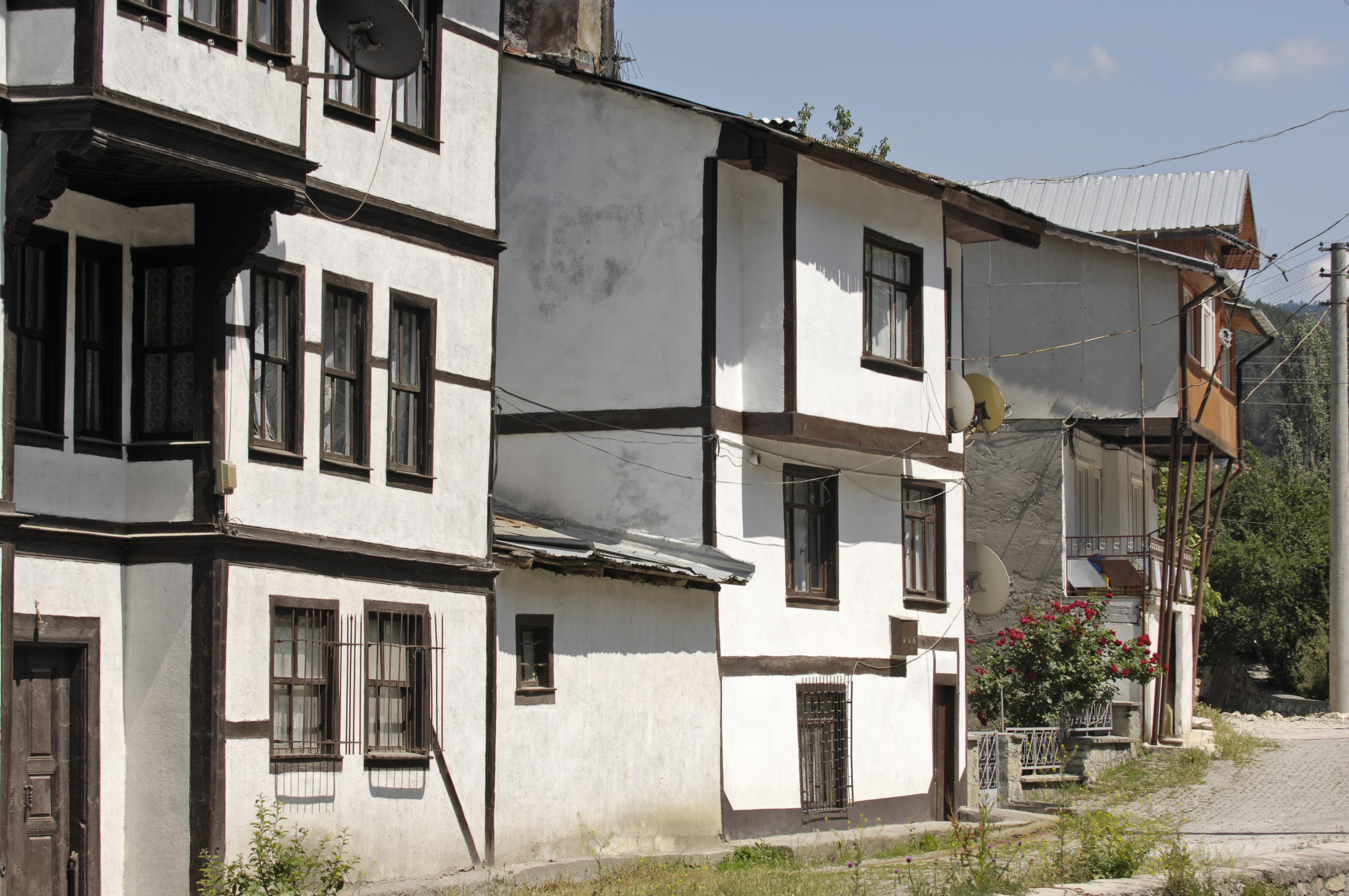
- Old houses in Mudurnu

- Location within Turkey
- Coordinates: 40°28′N 31°13′E
- Country: Turkey
- Province: Bolu
- District: Mudurnu

Government
  - Mayor: Necdet Türker (MHP)
- Population (2021): 5,379
- Time zone: UTC+3 (TRT)
- Climate: Csb
- Website: mudurnu.bel.tr

Mudurnu is a small town in Bolu Province in the Black Sea region of Turkey, 52 km south-west of the city of Bolu. It is the seat of Mudurnu District. Its population is 5,379 (2021). The mayor is Necdet Türker (MHP), elected in 2019.

== History ==
The town has a long history and the name Mudurnu comes from the Byzantine princess Modrene (Μωδρηνή in Byzantine Greek), and the ruins of the Byzantine castle can still be seen above the town. In the 8th century AD, the forces of the Byzantine usurper Artabasdos, commanded by his son Niketas, were defeated at or near this location by the army of the legitimate emperor Constantine V, before being defeated again at Chrysopolis, the same location where Constantine the Great defeated his Eastern rival Licinius.

In the late 19th and early 20th century, Mudurnu was part of the Kastamonu Vilayet of the Ottoman Empire.

This is an attractive district of forest and mountain. Mudurnu itself is a historical town with a number of well-preserved Ottoman Empire period houses. A portion of the centre of town has been declared an Historic Preservation District ("Kentsel Sit Alanı").

In 1920, during the Nationalists' push to gain control over the country, İbrahim Çolak with the Kuva-yi Milliye besieged forces loyal to the Porte for three days, May 13 to 15, before taking the town.

== Economy ==
Until 2002 when it went bankrupt, the local economy was heavily dependent on the "Mudurnu Chicken" (Mudurnu Tavuk) company, one of Turkey's largest poultry producers and fast-food chains. There is a large statue of a chicken at the edge of town. After the chicken processing plant closed in 2002, significant numbers of people left the town for jobs elsewhere and the remaining populace began to invest in tidying up and restoring the old town in order to attract tourists and weekend visitors. Many of the old houses are now restaurants serving local cuisine.

In 2007 as part of the dissolution of Mudurnu Chicken the brand name was sold to Pak Chicken (Pak Tavuk), who produced chicken under that brand name, but not in Mudurnu. Beginning in 2010 Pak Chicken opened a chicken packing plant in Mudurnu, employing 350 people by mid 2010.

== Places of interest ==
- Babas Kaplıcası - mineral water spring with accommodation in a restored Ottoman wooden bathhouse.
- Yildrim Bayezid Mosque - built in 1372 as part of a complex of dervish lodges, the hamam (Turkish bathhouse) and madrasha. According to the description at the mosque, it is the first mosque with a big single dome without columns.
- Yildrim Bayezid Hamam - still functional and beautiful Turkish bath with Sauna, built 1382 by Ömer Ibrahim.
- Lake Abant - located 20 kilometers North-East of Mudurnu
- The real estate development project The Burj Al Babas

== Gallery ==
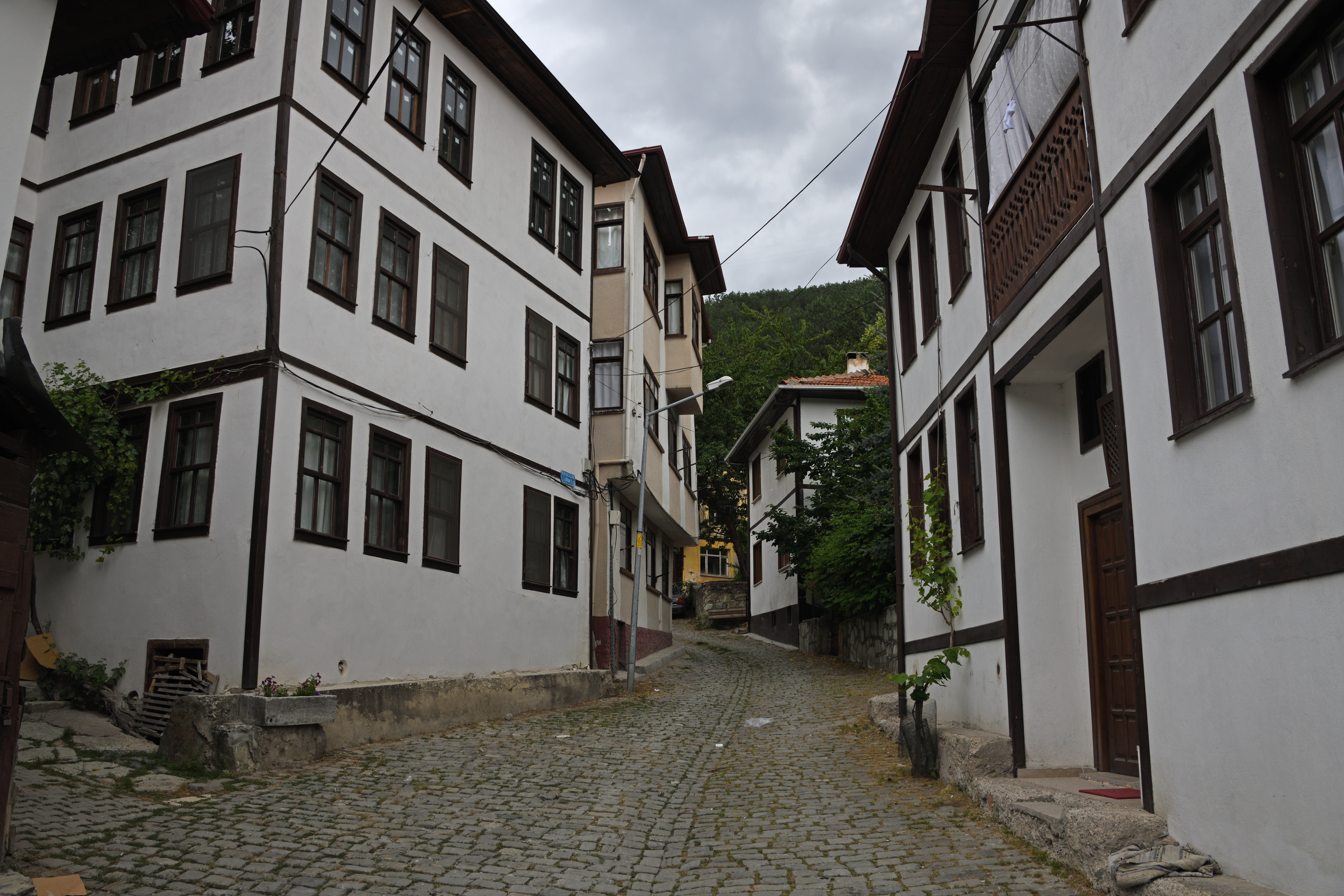
Mudurnu old houses

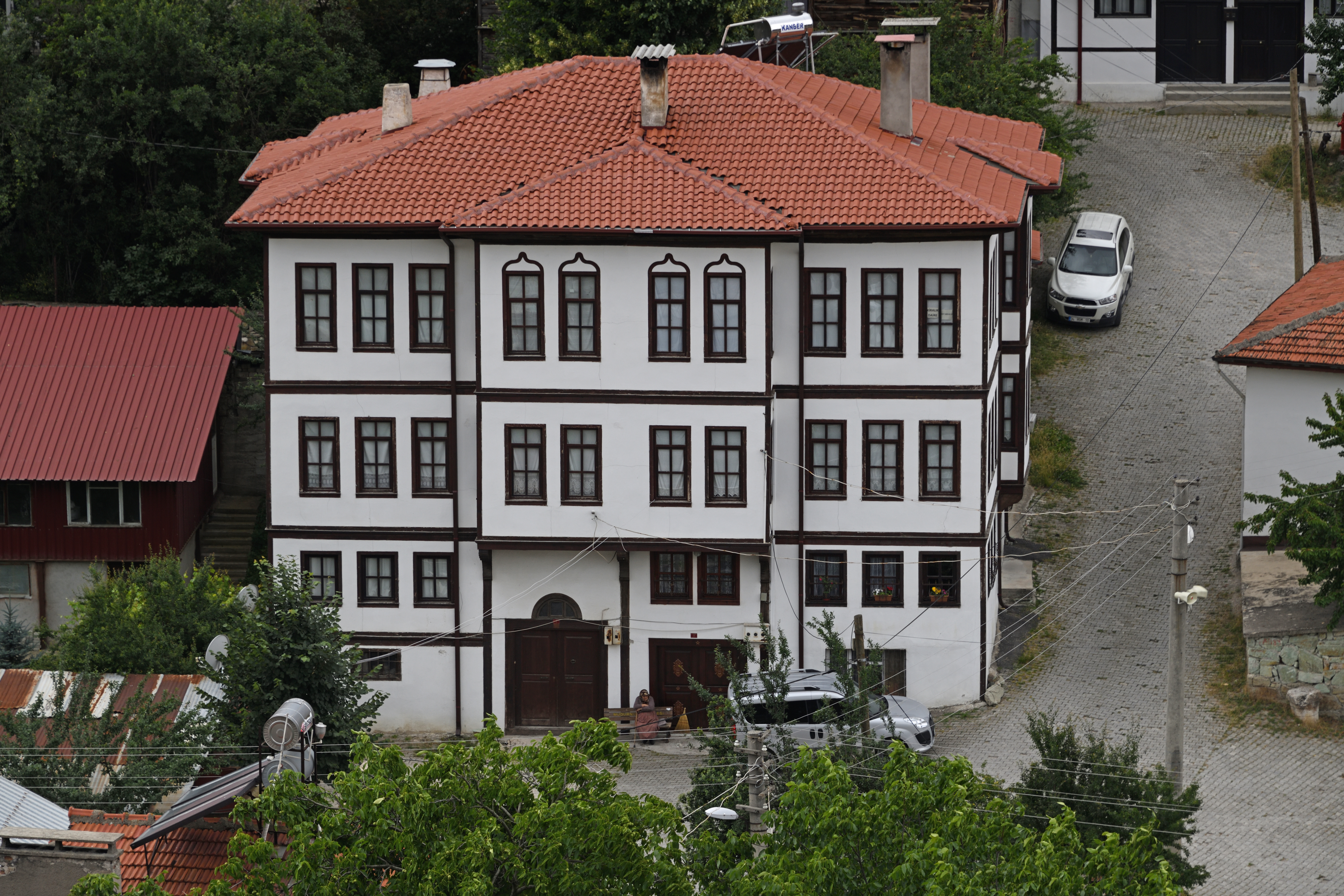
Mudurnu Konak

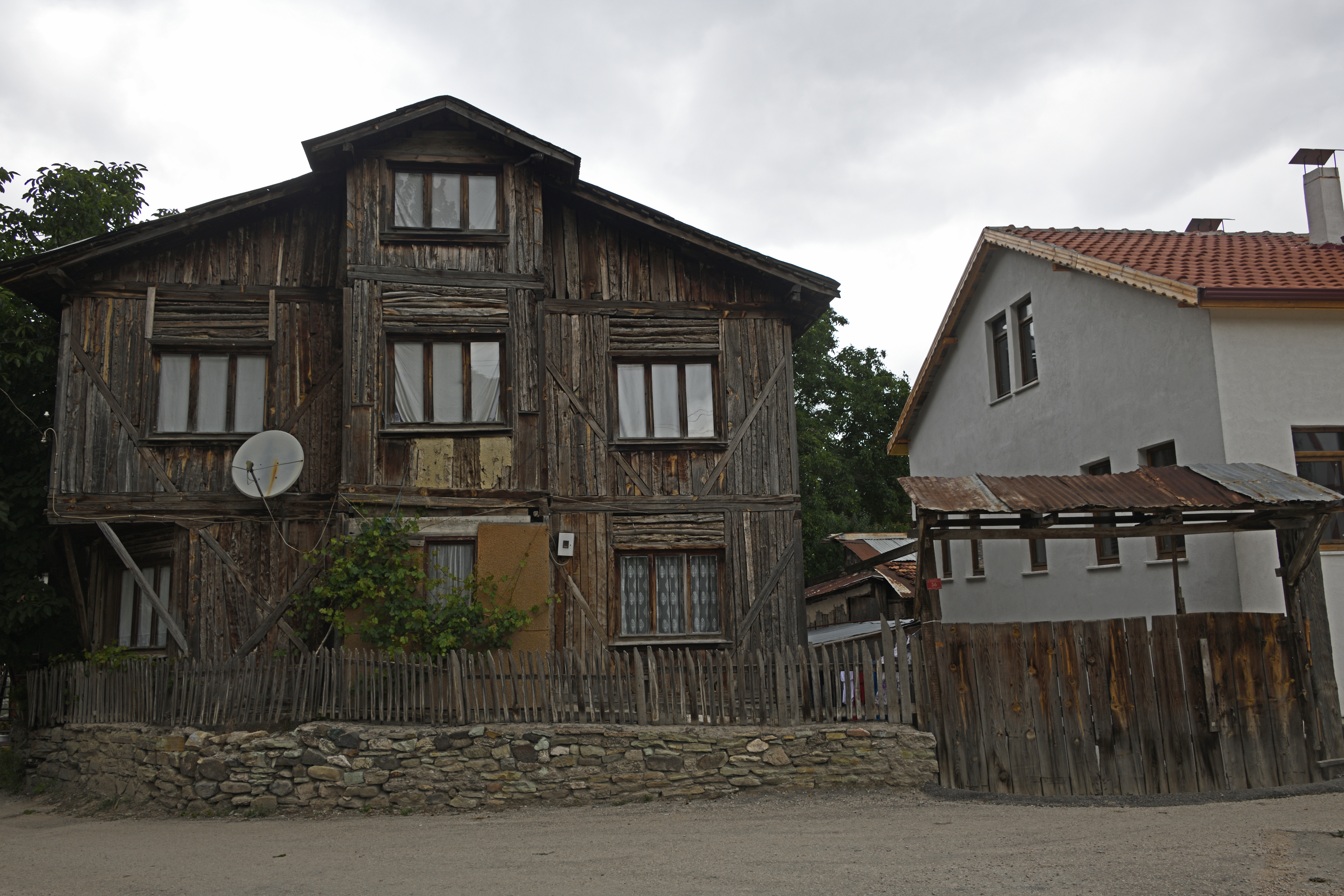
Mudurnu Konak

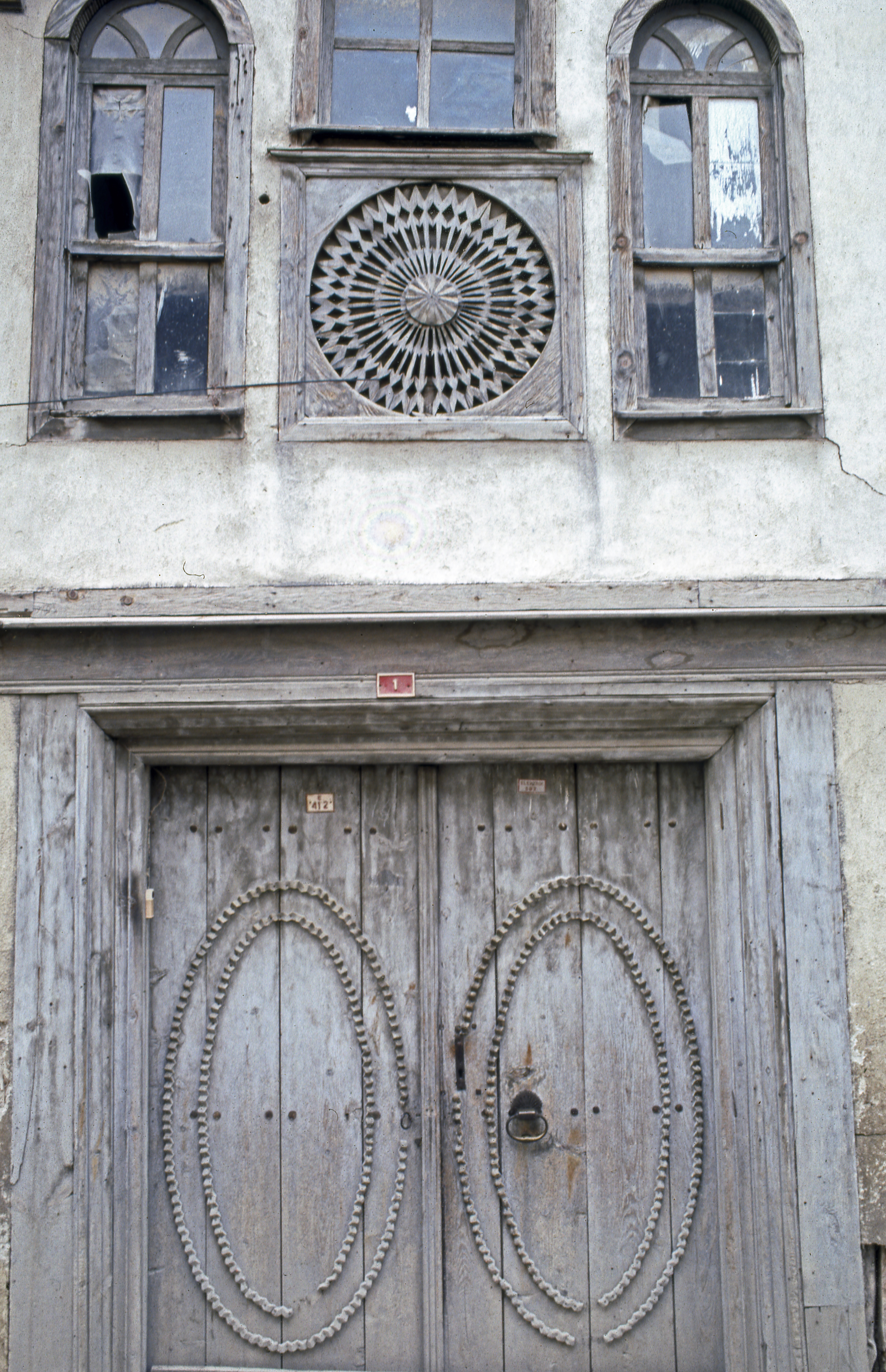
Mudurnu Decoration on house

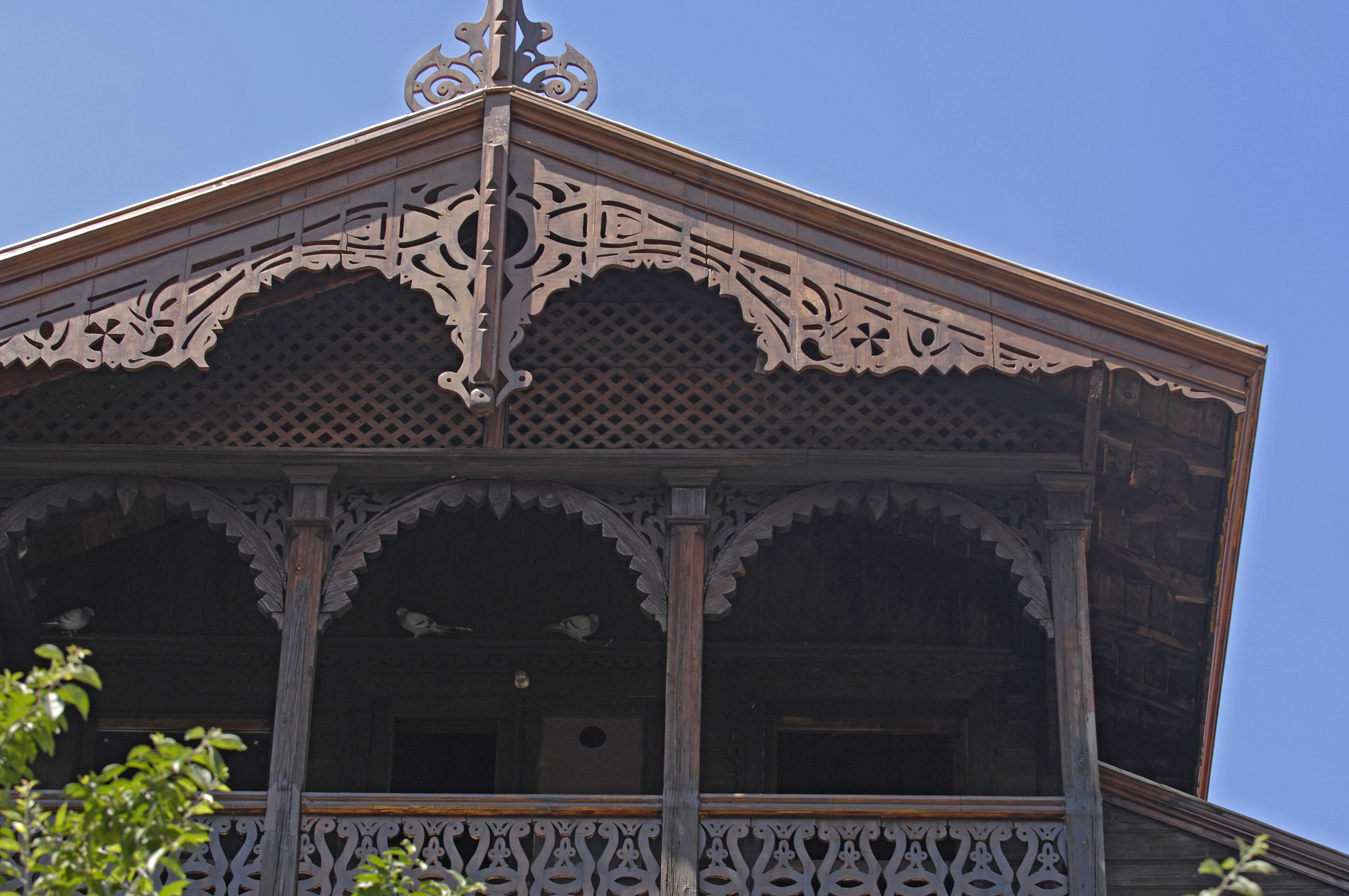
Mudurnu Decoration on house

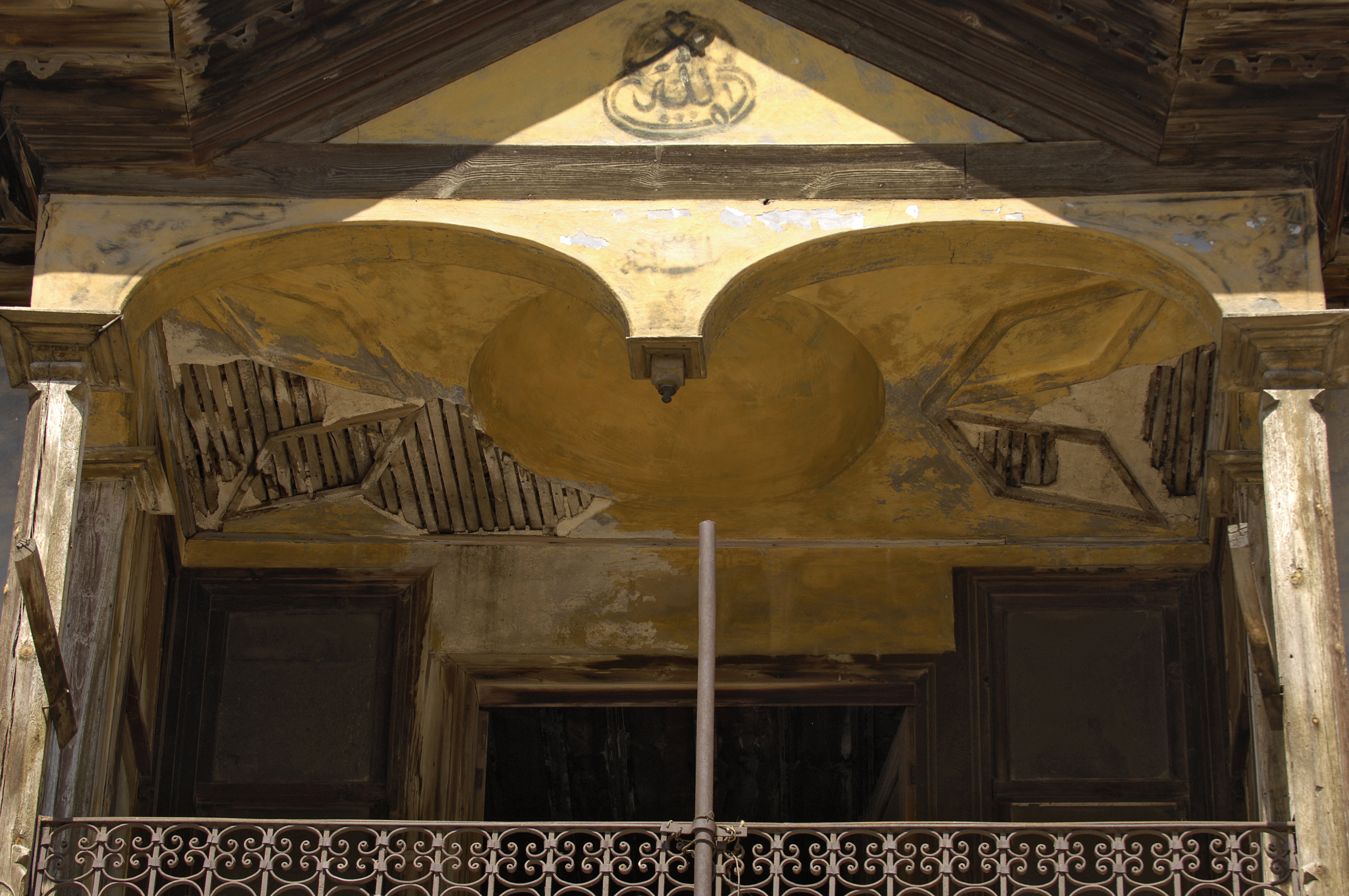
Mudurnu Decoration on house

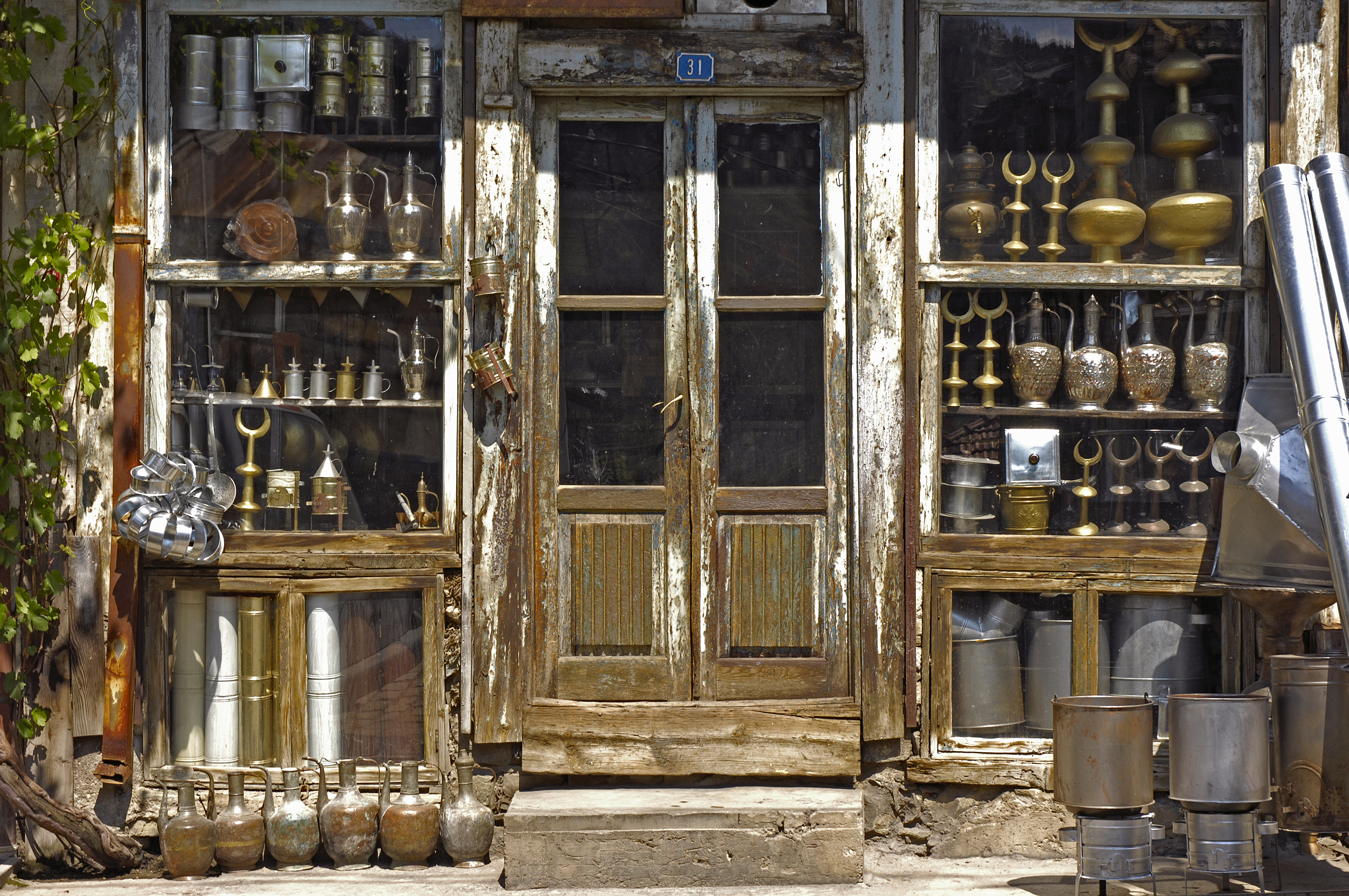
Mudurnu shop

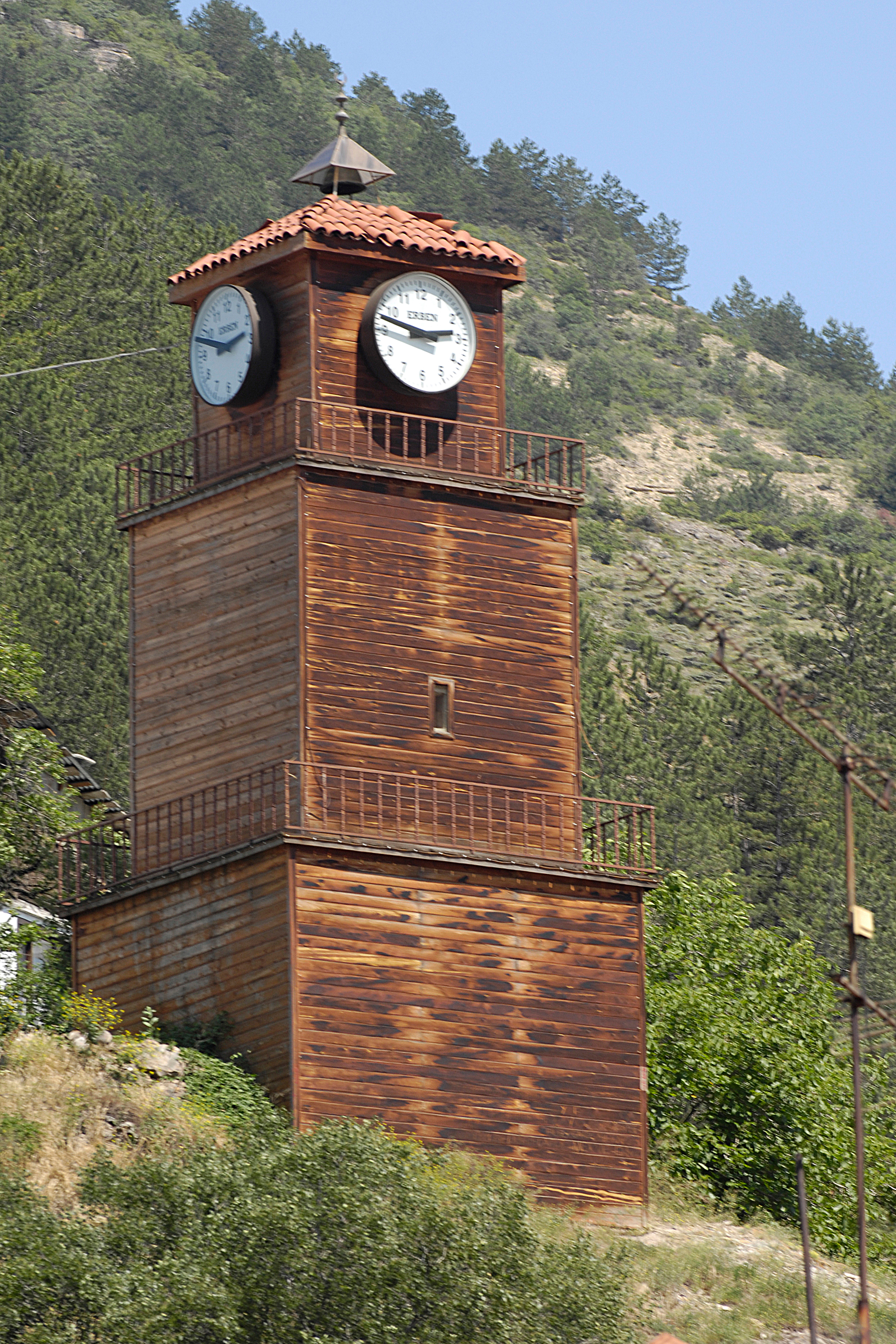
Mudurnu clock tower

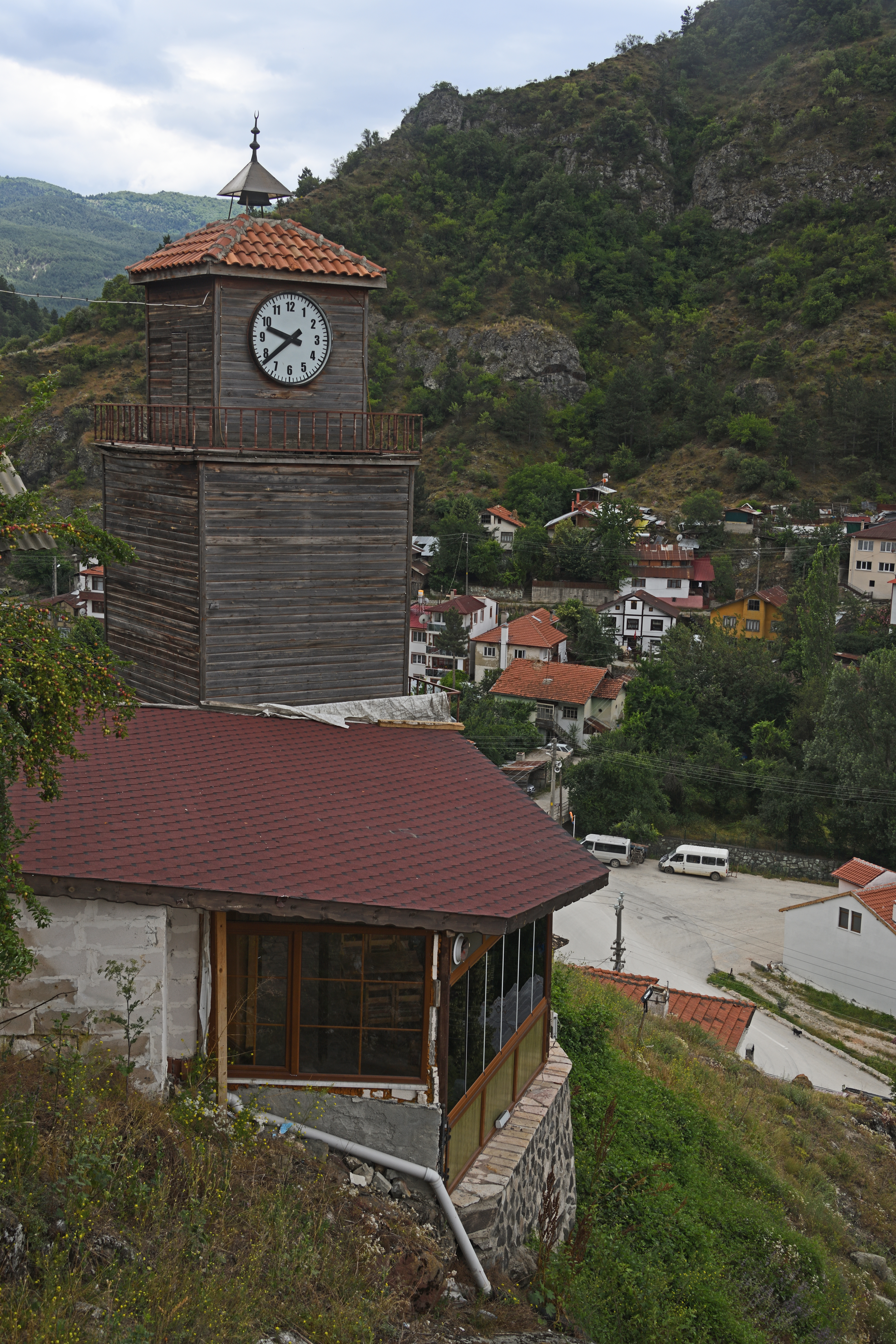
Mudurnu clock tower

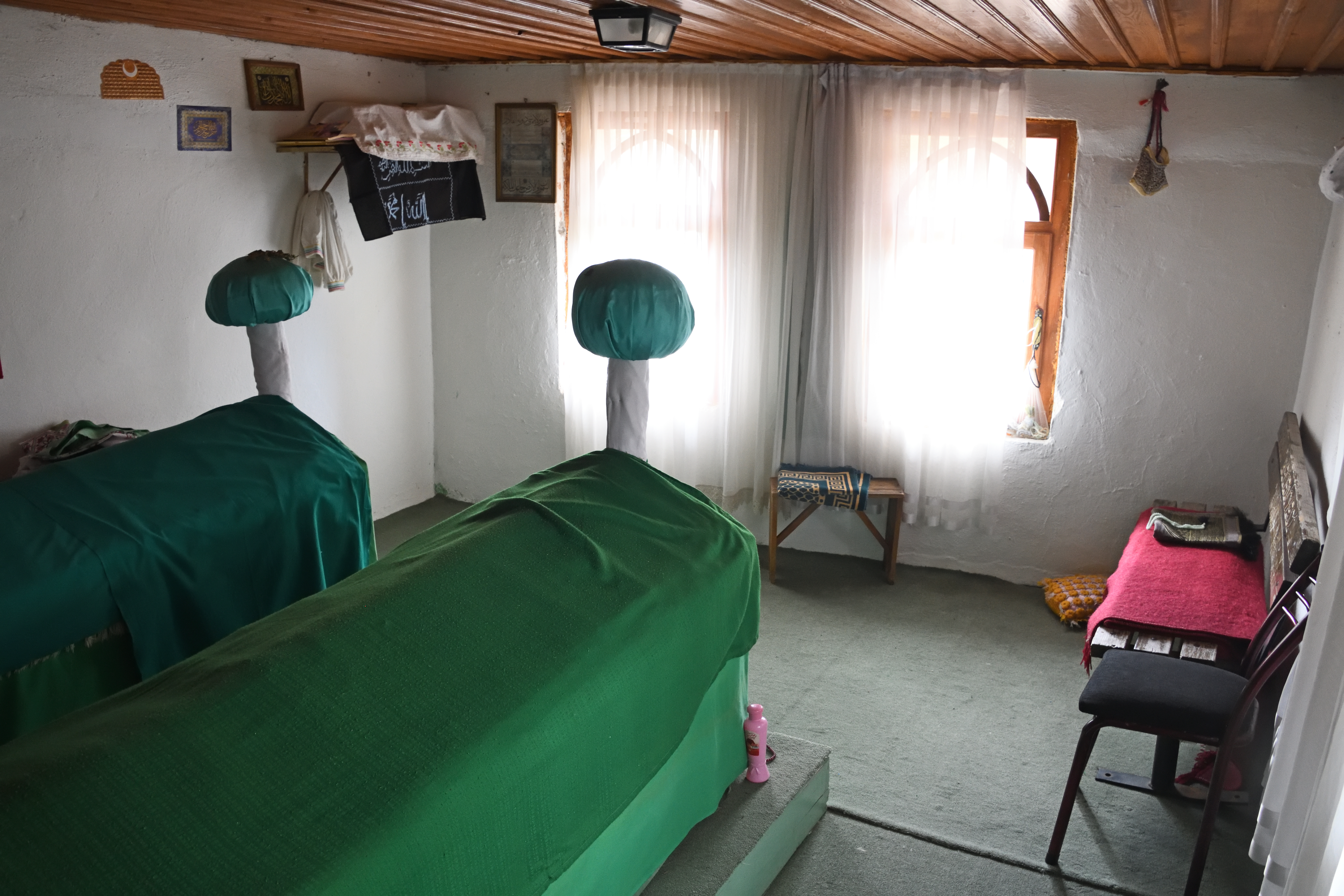
Mudurnu Doruk Baba tomb

Mudurnu panorama

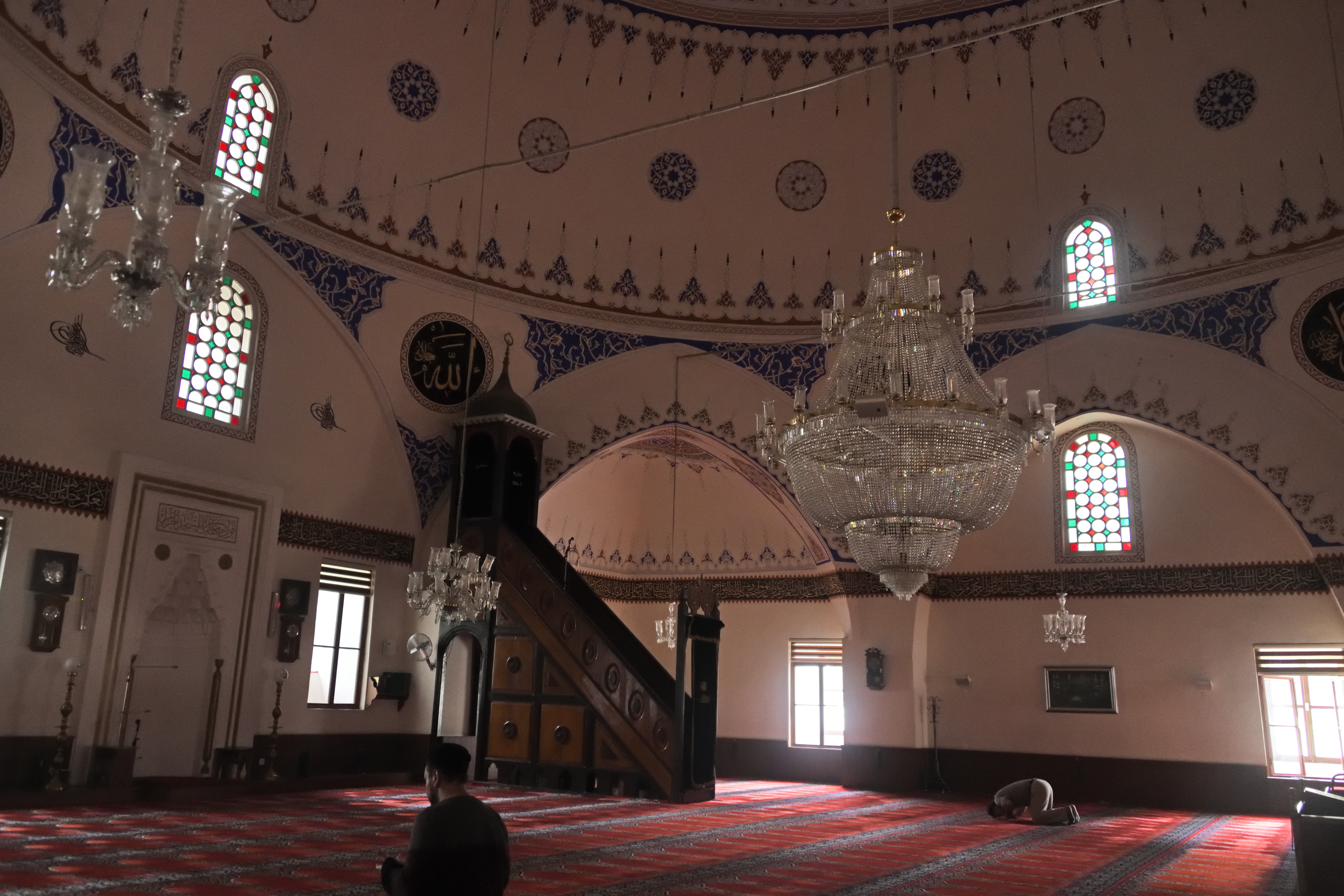
Mudurnu Yildirim Beyazit Mosque

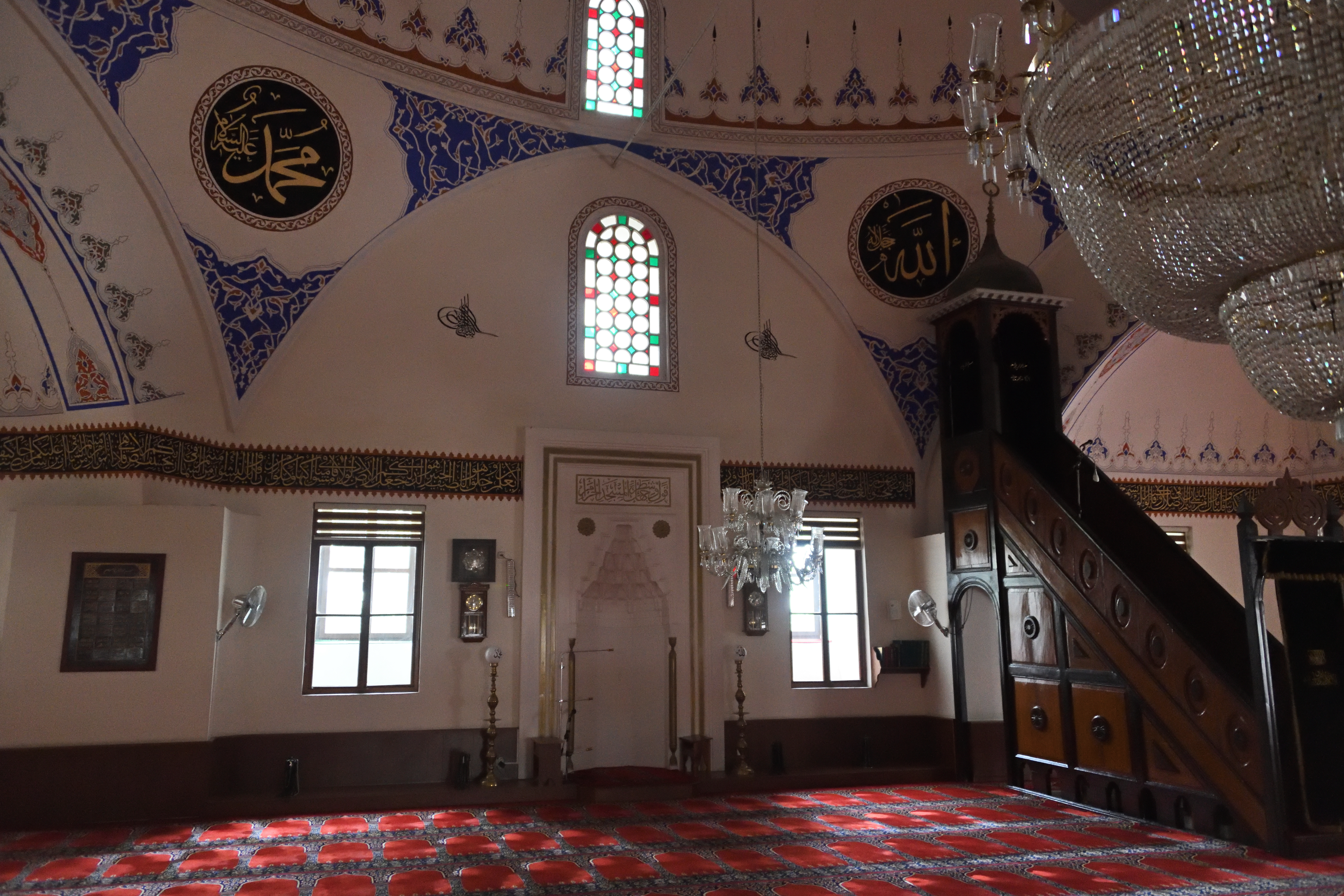
Mudurnu Yildirim Beyazit Mosque

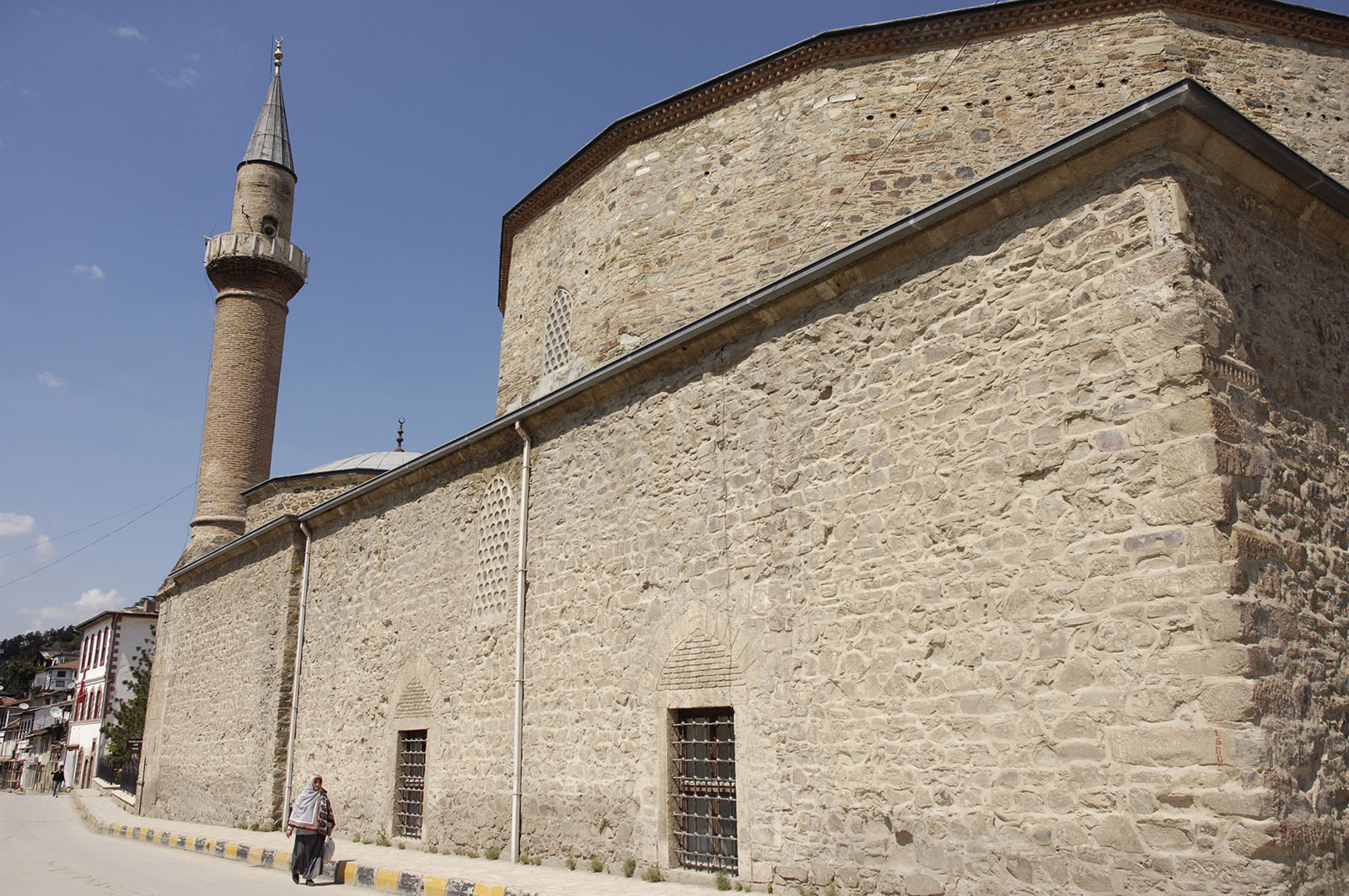
Mudurnu Yildirim Beyazit mosque

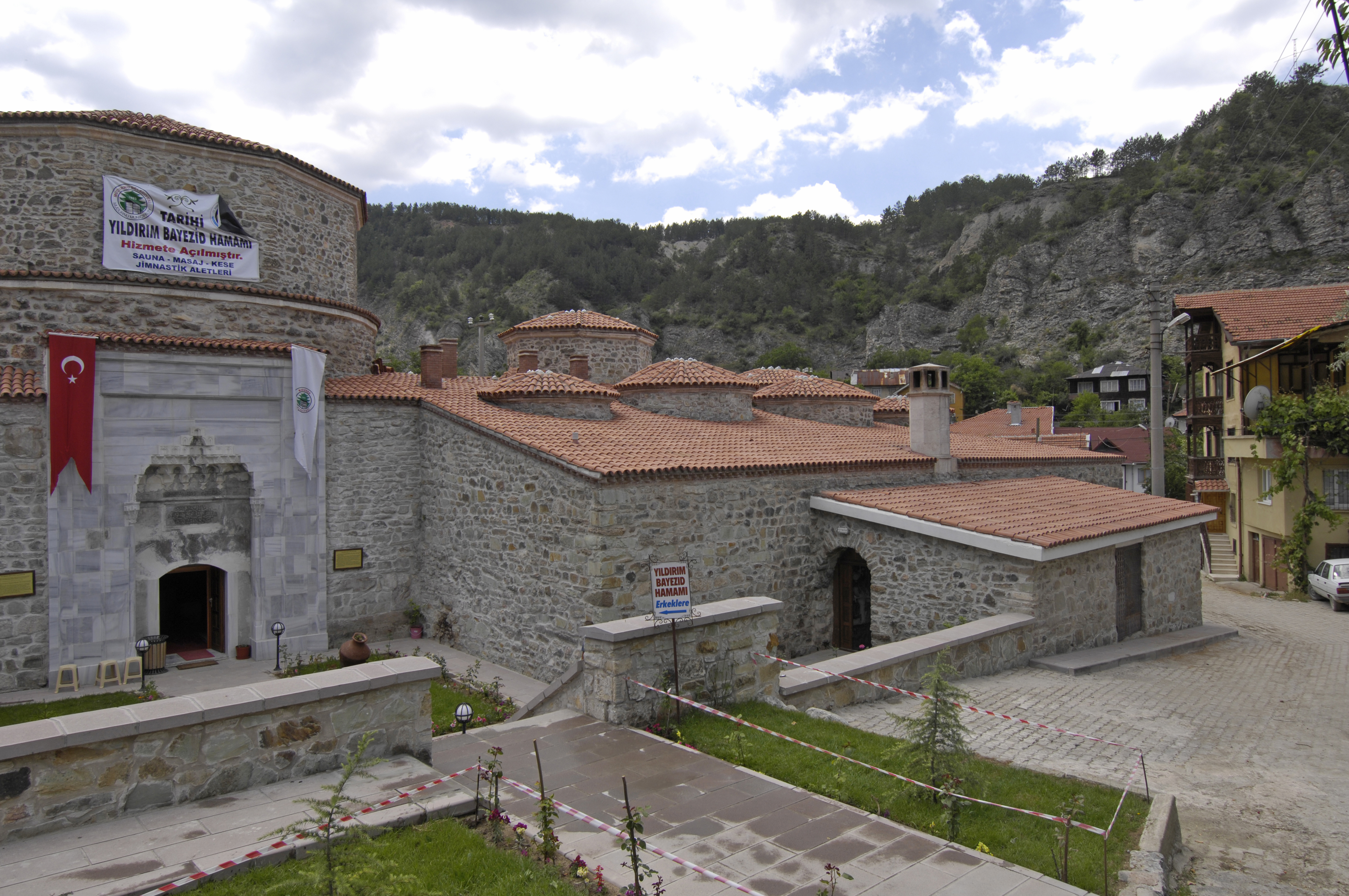
Mudurnu Yildirim Beyazit Bath

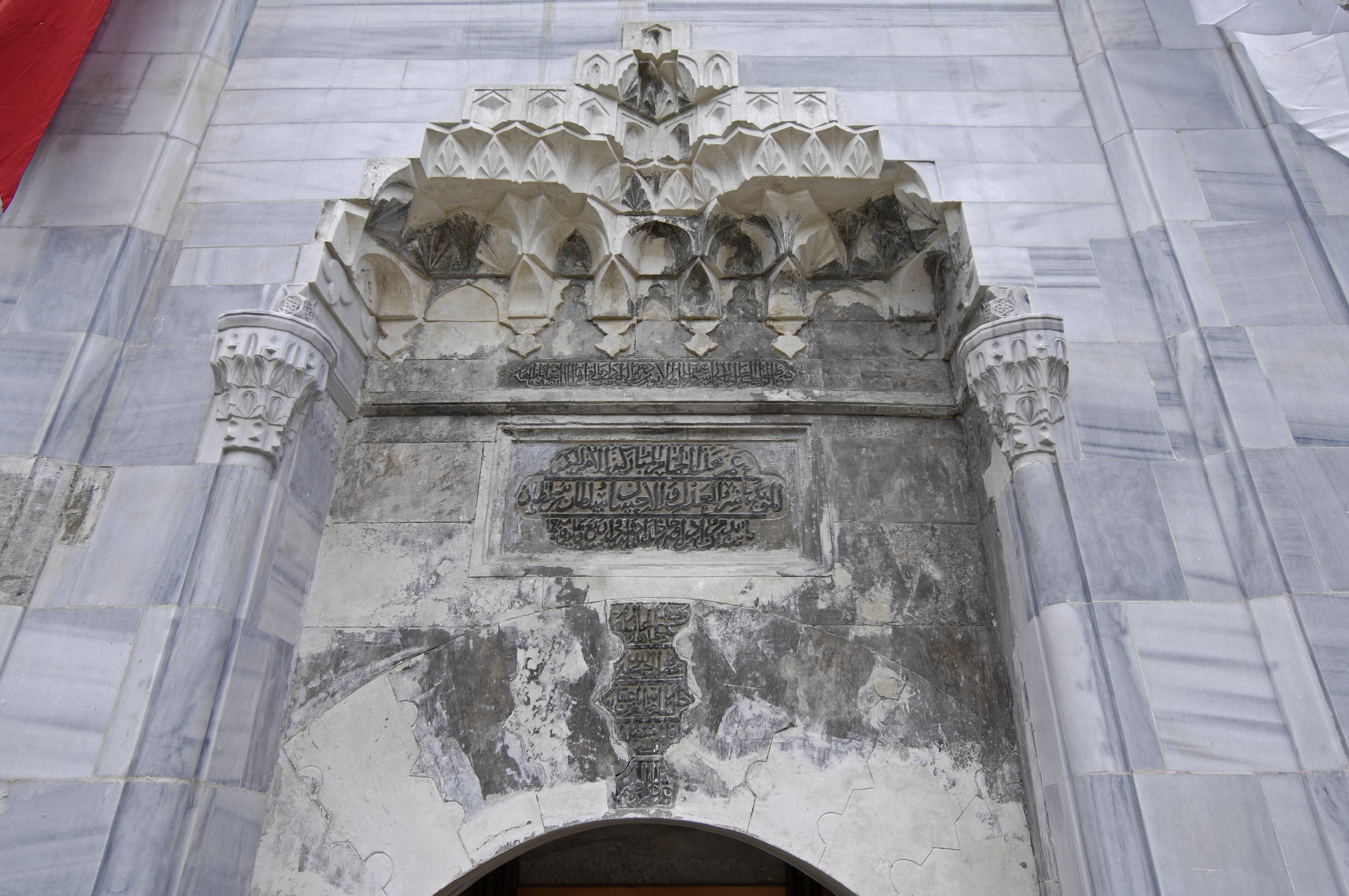
Mudurnu Yildirim Beyazit Bath Entrance

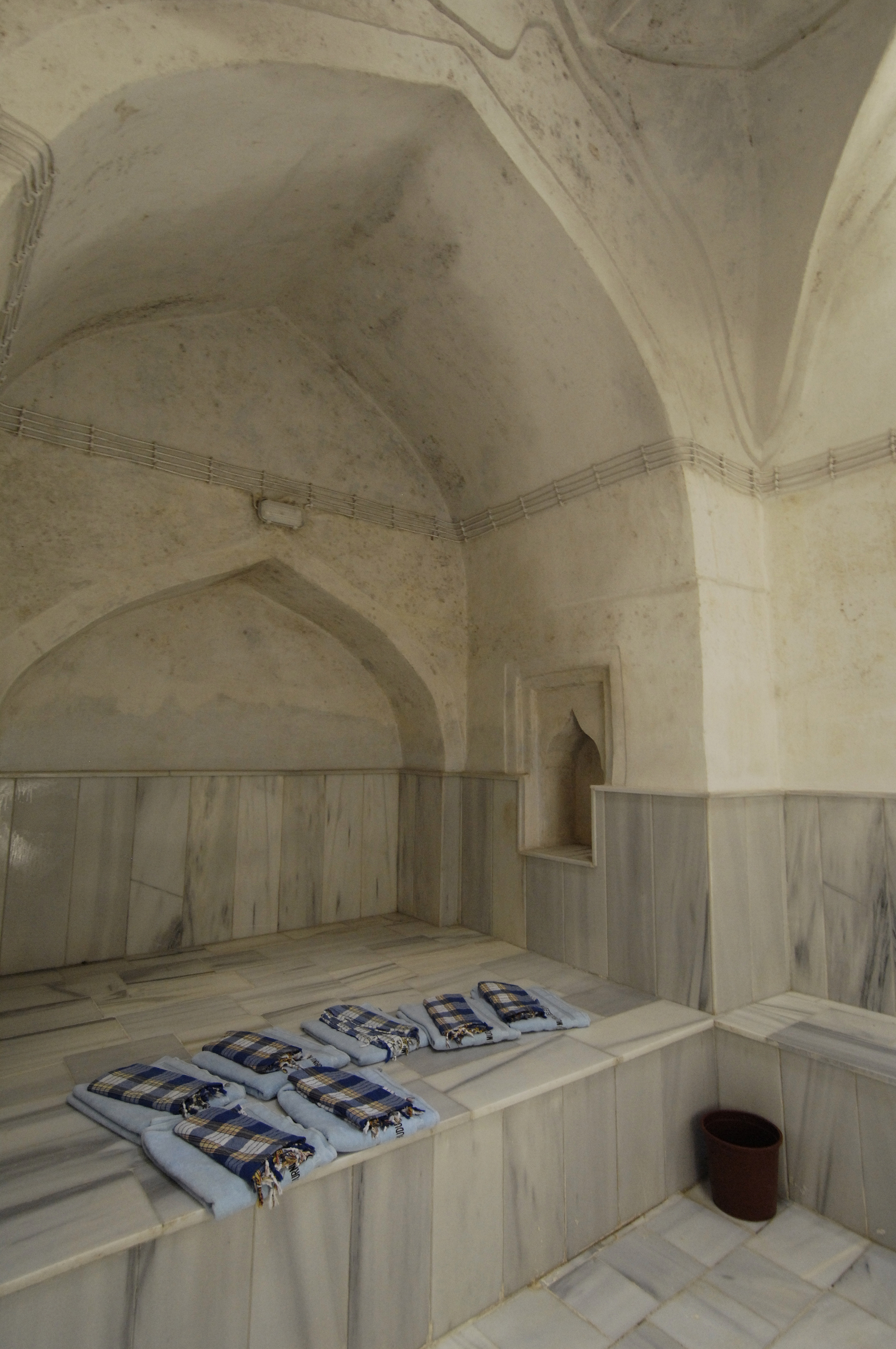
Mudurnu Yildirim Beyazit Bath

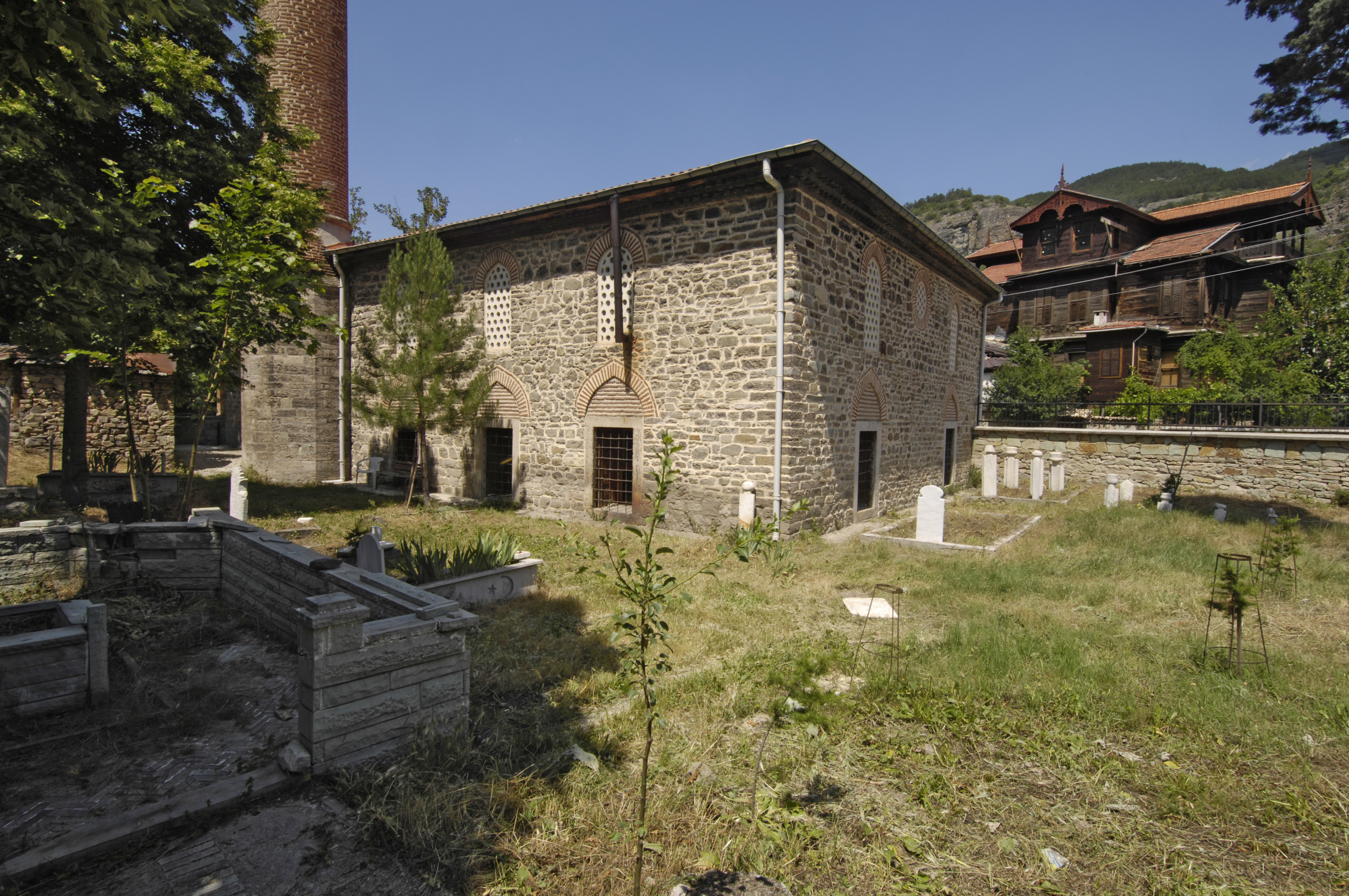
Mudurnu Kanuni Sultan Süleyman Camii

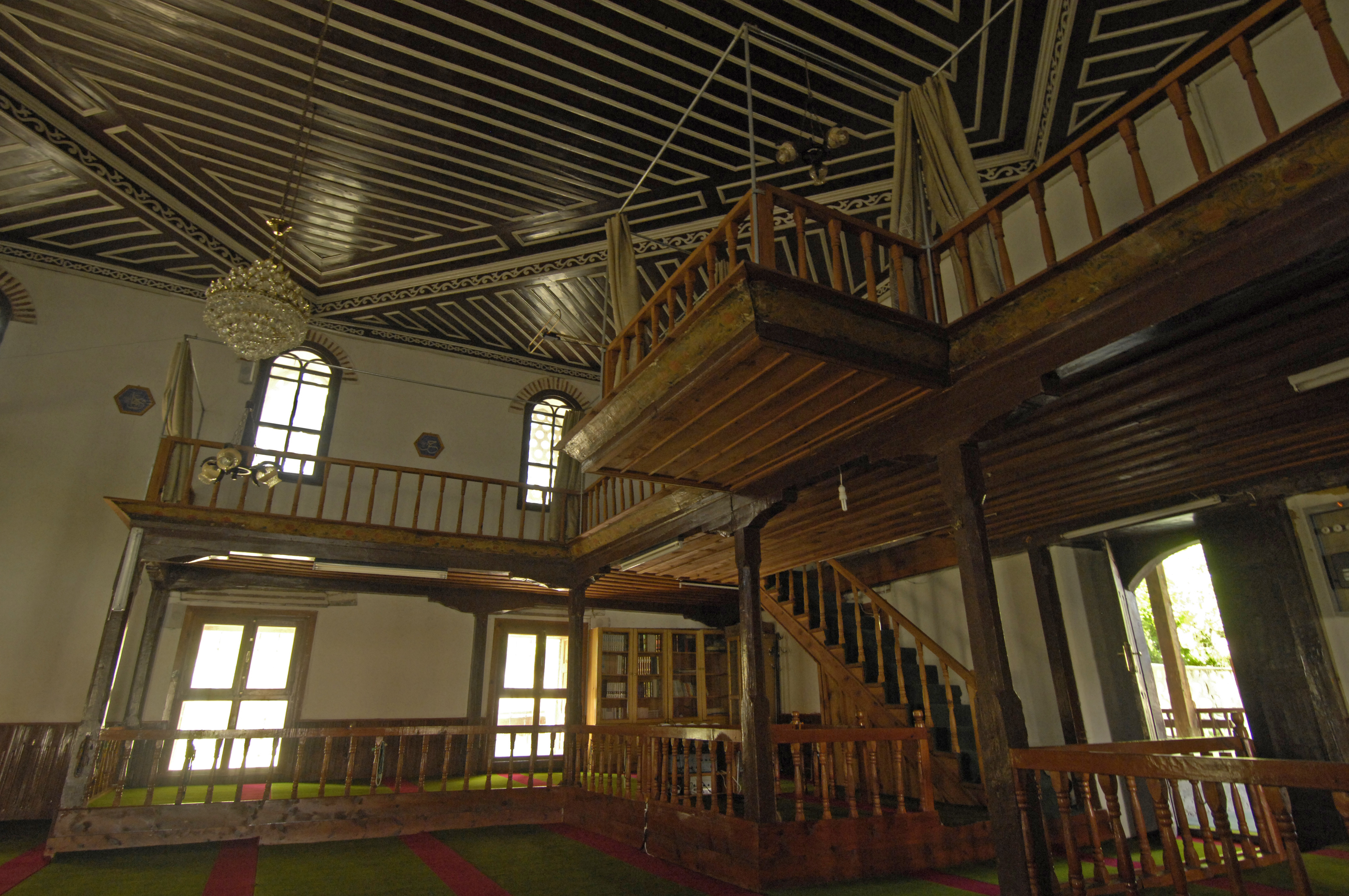
Mudurnu Kanuni Sultan Süleyman Camii

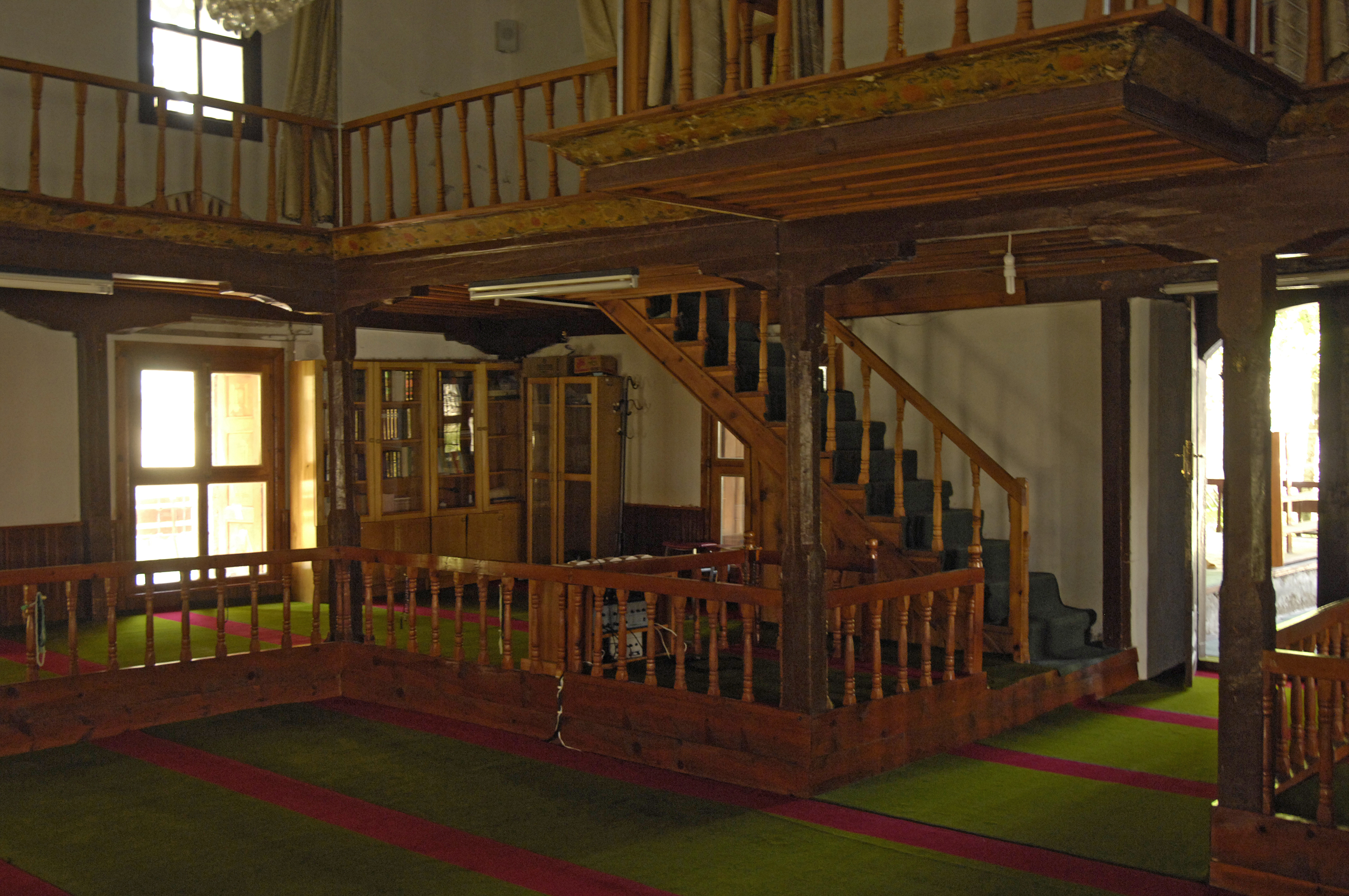
Mudurnu Kanuni Sultan Süleyman Camii
