= Burj Al Babas =

Abandoned housing development in Turkey

Coordinates: 40.44451°N 31.20215°E

Burj Al Babas is an abandoned residential development located near Mudurnu, Turkey with 732 nearly identical houses, each designed to resemble a miniature château. The site, under development by the Sarot Group, was abandoned in 2019 after the developers filed for bankruptcy with a debt of US$5 million.

Drone footage of the complex and its cluster of Disney-like chateaux appeared online in the early 2020s, raising interest in the history of the complex.

== Original concept ==
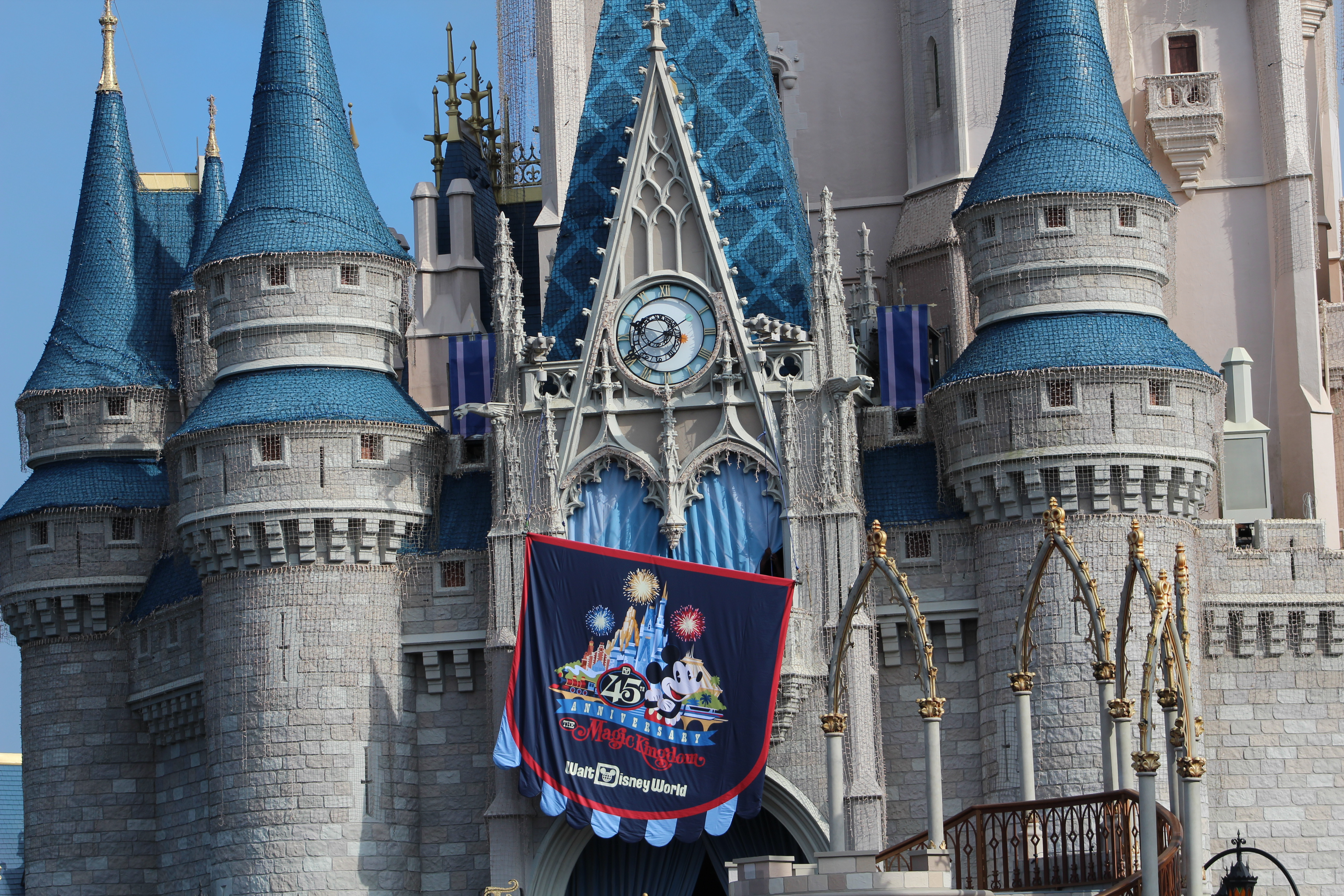
Burj Al Babas has also drawn comparisons with Cinderella Castle, Magic Kingdom

Burj Al Babas is a housing development project owned by Istanbul construction entrepreneurs The Yerdelen brothers. The project involved the construction of 732 three-storey luxury villas, all very similar to each other and characterised by elements of Gothic, English and American architecture. The cylindrical towers with dormer windows and the square towers with balustrades were respectively inspired by the Galata Tower and Maiden's Tower in Istanbul. The name means "tower of Babas" in Arabic, referring to the nearby Babas Kaplıcası (Babas thermal spring), a bath house from the Ottoman era.

According to the original brochure, the centre of the complex was to include a domed structure containing a shopping centre, health and beauty facilities such as hamams, a mosque, a movie theatre, and other facilities.

The houses were on sale for between $370,000 and $530,000.

Aiming for the Arab market, the partners named the development the Burj Al Babas Thermal Tourism Company and began marketing the houses through their real estate agency in Kuwait.

The site in the Black Sea region of Turkey was situated near the region's hot springs. Excavations on the site revealed that 200 meters underground the water temperature reached 68°C (154°F).

== Complications ==
Construction began on the complex in 2014. Using 2,500 workers, the developers aimed to finish the project in four years. Sales were originally successful, with approximately half of the castles selling in advance. The buyers were primarily from the Gulf states, with approximately 150 from Kuwait City.

A contractor, Çapan Demircan, filed a complaint in 2014 that the construction company had breached environmental laws during the project, regarding their disposal of rubble. In February 2015, workers began to protest that they had not been paid. This culminated in one of the workers scaling one of the towers and threatening to jump; he was ultimately taken down by firefighters. Demircan pulled out of the project shortly afterwards, alleging that he was owed $700,000. He pursued the case for several years and was in violent altercations with Sarot Group individuals on two occasions, but has since abandoned the environmental lawsuit.

By late 2016, construction work on the castles was behind schedule. This was initially attributed to the cold winter weather, then to a failed military coup that July. Contractors were not attending the site, with suspected complaints about payments.

In 2018, sales stalled, causing the developer to enter bankruptcy. Falling oil prices and instability in Turkey were cited as reasons for the slump in sales. The mayor of Mudurnu, Mehmet İnegöl, remained confident that the project would begin again. A 2022 bankruptcy court ruling declared that the Sarot group was "comfortably in credit".

As of 2022, no castles are finished, with 587 of them half-built. Many of them have water damage, likely accrued from snowfall through the winters.

In the summer of 2024, the Emir of Kuwait, Mishal Al-Ahmad Al-Jaber Al-Sabah visited Turkey and spoke with President Erdoğan; although details of the conversation have not been revealed, it is thought that the unfinished development was discussed. This was followed by a renewal of interest in the case. The fourteen companies run by the Yerdelen and the Sarot Group were entrusted to a Turkish state fund intended to rectify the financial situation of troubled businesses.

== In popular culture ==
Burj Al Babas is the setting for the music video of "Lose Control", a 2019 song by Meduza, Becky Hill and Goodboys.
