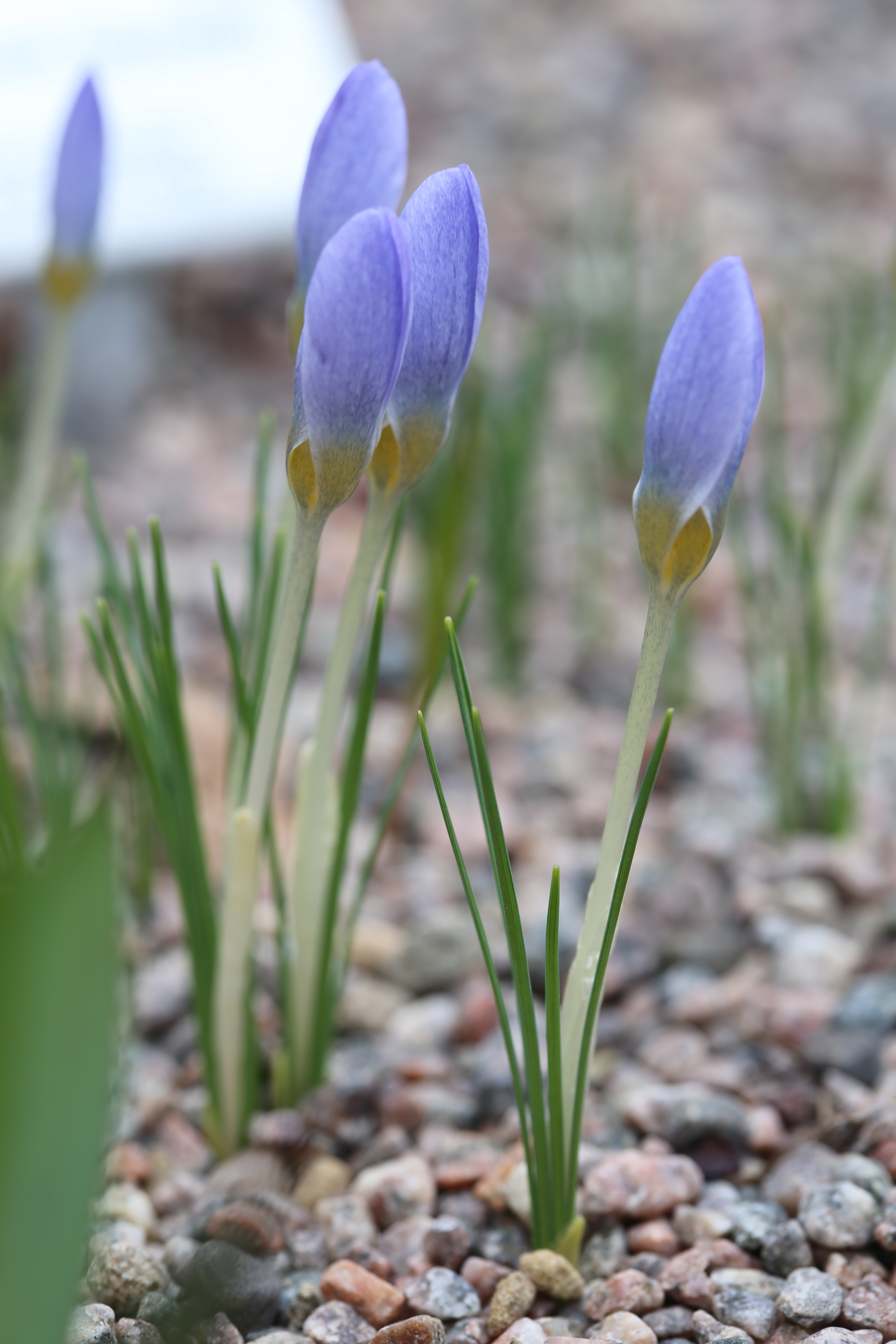

Scientific classification
- Kingdom: Plantae
- Clade: Embryophytes
- Clade: Tracheophytes
- Clade: Angiosperms
- Clade: Monocots
- Order: Asparagales
- Family: Iridaceae
- Genus: Crocus
- Species: C. abantensis

Binomial name
- Crocus abantensis T.Baytop & B.Mathew

= Crocus abantensis =

Species of flowering plant

Crocus abantensis is a species of flowering plant in the genus Crocus of the family Iridaceae. It is a cormous perennial native to northwestern Turkey.
