= Bridget Jones's Baby: Original Motion Picture Soundtrack =

2016 soundtrack album by various artists

Soundtrack album by various artists
- Released: 16 September 2016
- Length: 71:17
- Label: Polydor

Singles from Bridget Jones's Baby: Original Motion Picture Soundtrack
- 1. "Still Falling for You" Released: 19 August 2016; 2. "Meteorite" Released: 13 September 2016

Bridget Jones's Baby: Original Motion Picture Soundtrack is the soundtrack album to the 2016 film Bridget Jones's Baby, directed by Sharon Maguire. It was released on 16 September 2016 by Polydor Records.

== Promotion ==
The first single to be released from the soundtrack was "Still Falling for You" by English singer Ellie Goulding and co-written by Tove Lo. Issued on 19 August 2016, Goulding first teased the track and its accompanying music video on Instagram, posting a short preview of the song's visual, which shows the pop star shrouded in silhouette as she stands in front of a projection. "Still Falling for You" became a top ten hit in various music markets, including the Czech Republic, Hungary, Poland, Slovakia, Slovenia, and Switzerland. The song reached Platinum status in Brazil and the United Kingdom.

== Critical reception ==
Professional ratings
Review scores
Source	Rating
The Yorkshire Times	4/5 stars

AllMusic editor Marcy Donelson noted that that Bridget Jones's Baby "features a mix of classic R&B and contemporary dance-pop highlighted by the original song 'Still Falling for You' by Ellie Goulding." He concluded: "Though mostly danceable, the soundtrack winds down with two pieces of original score material from composer Craig Armstrong." Graham Clark, writing for The Yorkshire Times, rated the album four out of five stars and wrote: "Basically the album is a mixture of old and new. If you have seen the film you will remember the songs but the album is worth getting even if you have not seen the film as it stands up in its own right." Bustle's Jenn Ficarra called the album "an excellent soundtrack chock full of hits. Seriously, what's on the Bridget Jones's Baby soundtrack is truly impressive, and fans will certainly want to check these songs out."

== Chart performance ==
Bridget Jones's Baby debuted at number one on the UK Soundtrack Albums in the week ending 29 September 2016. On 23 December 2016, it was certified Silver by the British Phonographic Industry (BPI) for sales and streaming figures in excess of 60,000 units. Elsewhere, the album reached the top ten in Poland, the Czech Republic, and Australia. In the United States, it peaked at number 166 on the US Billboard 200. On 14 September 2017, Bridget Jones's Baby reached Gold status in Poland.

== Track listing ==
Bridget Jones's Baby track listing
No.	Title	Writer(s)	Performer(s)	Length
1.	"Still Falling for You"	Ellie Goulding; Tove Lo; Rickard Göransson; Shellback; Ilya	Ellie Goulding	4:03
2.	"Meteorite"	Olly Alexander; Emre Turkmen; Michael Goldsworthy	Years & Years	3:27
3.	"Reignite"	Knox Brown; Fabienne Holloway	Knox Brown and Gallant	3:25
4.	"Thinking Out Loud" (campfire version)	Ed Sheeran; Amy Wadge	Ed Sheeran	4:12
5.	"Hold My Hand"	Janee Bennett; Ina Wroldsen; Jack Patterson; Jessica Glynne	Jess Glynne	3:46
6.	"Slave to the Vibe"	Peter Lord; Guy Charles Routte; Vernon Jeffrey Smith	Billon	2:48
7.	"King"	Alexander; Turkmen; Goldsworthy; Mark Ralph; Andy Smith	Years & Years	3:34
8.	"Run"	Adam Simon; Ellis Taylor; Milton Rogers	Tiggs da Author	2:50
9.	"Fuck You"	Lily Allen; Greg Kurstin	Lily Allen	3:41
10.	"The Hurting Time"	Annie Lennox	Annie Lennox	7:33
11.	"Jump Around"	Erik Schrody; Larry Muggerud	House of Pain	3:37
12.	"That Lady, Pts. 1 & 2"	Ronald Isley; O'Kelly Isley Jr.; Ernest Isley; Marvin Isley; Christopher Jasper	The Isley Brothers	5:36
13.	"Walk On By"	Burt Bacharach; Hal David	Dionne Warwick	2:57
14.	"Just My Imagination (Running Away with Me)"	Norman Whitfield; Barrett Strong	The Temptations	3:49
15.	"I Heard It Through the Grapevine"	Whitfield; Strong	Marvin Gaye	3:14
16.	"We Are Family"	Nile Rodgers; Bernard Edwards	Sister Sledge	3:37
17.	"Ain't No Stoppin' Us Now"	Jerry Cohen; Gene McFadden; John Whitehead	McFadden & Whitehead	3:37
18.	"Race to Mark's Flat"	Craig Armstrong	Craig Armstrong	2:13
19.	"Wedding"	Armstrong	Craig Armstrong	3:08
Total length:				71:17

== Charts ==
Chart performance for Bridget Jones's Baby
Chart (2016–2017)	Peak position
Australian Albums (ARIA)	7
Austrian Albums (Ö3 Austria)	71
Belgian Albums (Ultratop Flanders)	189
Belgian Albums (Ultratop Wallonia)	111
Czech Albums (ČNS IFPI)	5
French Albums (SNEP)	77
Italian Compilation Albums (FIMI)	16
New Zealand Albums (RMNZ)	17
Polish Albums (ZPAV)	3
Spanish Albums (Promusicae)	21
UK Soundtrack Albums (Official Charts)	1
US Billboard 200	166
US Soundtrack Albums (Billboard)	5

== Certifications ==
Certifications for Bridget Jones's Baby
Region	Certification	Certified units/sales
Poland (ZPAV)	Gold	10,000^{‡}
United Kingdom (BPI)	Silver	60,000^{‡}
^{‡} Sales+streaming figures based on certification alone.
