= Meteorite (Years & Years song) =

Single by Years & Years

from the album Bridget Jones's Baby: Original Motion Picture Soundtrack
- Released: 13 September 2016
- Recorded: 2016
- Genre: Dance-pop
- Length: 3:25
- Label: Polydor
- Songwriter(s): Olly Alexander; Mikey Goldsworthy; Emre Türkmen
- Producer(s): Years & Years; Mark Ralph

Years & Years singles chronology
"Worship" (2016)	"Meteorite" (2016)	"Sanctify" (2018)

Music video
- "Meteorite" on YouTube

"Meteorite" is a song by British synthpop trio Years & Years. It written by band members Olly Alexander, Mikey Goldsworthy, and Emre Türkmen for the soundtrack to the 2016 British romantic comedy film Bridget Jones's Baby, while production was helmed by Years & Years along with Mark Ralph. It was released as the second single from the soundtrack on 13 September 2016, following Ellie Goulding's "Still Falling for You".

== Formats and track listings ==
- Digital download
1. "Meteorite" – 3:25
- Digital download
1. "Meteorite" (Acoustic) – 4:03
- Digital download
1. "Meteorite" (TIEKS Remix) – 5:04
2. "Meteorite" (Kideko Remix) – 3:53
3. "Meteorite" (Fakear Remix) – 3:36

== Charts ==
Chart (2016)	Peak position
Belgium (Ultratip Bubbling Under Flanders)	17
Belgium (Ultratip Bubbling Under Wallonia)	42
Czech Republic (Rádio – Top 100)	77
Hungary (Rádiós Top 40)	19
Hungary (Single Top 40)	35
Scotland (OCC)	39
UK Singles (OCC)	72
US Hot Dance/Electronic Songs (Billboard)	37

== Release history ==
Country	Date	Format	Version	Label	Ref.
United Kingdom	13 September 2016	Digital download	Original	Polydor	
United Kingdom	7 October 2016	Digital download	Acoustic	Polydor	
United Kingdom	14 October 2016	Digital download	The Remixes	Polydor	
