= Polari (album) =

Studio album by Olly Alexander
- Released: 7 February 2025
- Genre: Alternative pop
- Length: 40:15
- Label: Polydor
- Producers: Olly Alexander; Danny L Harle

Olly Alexander chronology
Night Call (2022)	Polari (2025)

Singles from Polari
- 1. "Dizzy" Released: 1 March 2024; 2. "Cupid's Bow" Released: 11 October 2024; 3. "Archangel" Released: 13 December 2024; 4. "When We Kiss" Released: 10 January 2025; 5. "Whisper in the Waves" Released: 7 February 2025

Polari is the debut studio album by English singer-songwriter Olly Alexander, that was released on 7 February 2025 through Polydor Records. Created with producer Danny L Harle, it is the first solo album released under Alexander's name following the disbandment of Years & Years, which last released an album in 2022. Polari takes its name from the coded language historically used in Britain by the gay community and was supported by the Up Close and Polari Tour throughout Europe in early 2025.

According to Alexander, the album is inspired by electropop and other music of the 1980s such as Pet Shop Boys, Kate Bush, and Erasure. The album includes references to cowboys, gods, and music executives, and its themes include intimacy, desire, voyeurism, and fate. The aesthetics of Polari are inspired by filmmaker and gay rights activist Derek Jarman.

"Cupid's Bow", the album's lead single, was released on 11 October 2024, while the title track was released on 22 November 2024. In addition, "Archangel" was released as the third single on 13 December 2024, followed by "When We Kiss" on 10 January 2025. Polari also includes "Dizzy", Alexander's entry representing the United Kingdom in the Eurovision Song Contest 2024.

== Background ==
Alexander was previously a member of British synthpop band Years & Years, who formed in 2010. They achieved their commercial breakthrough in 2015 after their debut single "King" topped the UK singles chart. The band, consisting of Alexander, Mikey Goldsworthy, and Emre Türkmen released two studio albums, Communion (2015) and Palo Santo (2018), and were nominated for six Brit Awards. In March 2021, the band announced that Goldsworth and Türkmen would be stepping down as active members, and that Years & Years would continue as an Alexander solo project who, at the time, admitted to being reluctant to giving the name up and release music under his own name. The final Years & Years album, Night Call was released in 2022 and promoted through the Night Call Tour that same year.

On 16 December 2023, it was announced that Olly Alexander will be representing the United Kingdom at the Eurovision Song Contest 2024 using his name instead of Years & Years. Following his Eurovision announcement, he told the BBC that he'd "wanted to do it for a while" and it "felt like this was the right time to start releasing music under my name". Alexander's first song under his own name, "Dizzy" was released on 1 March 2024. With the song, Alexander ultimately finished in 18th place at the Contest scoring 46 jury points (13th) but zero points from the public (25th). "Dizzy" was later revealed to be included on the track list to Polari.

On 9 October 2024, Alexander teased an upcoming album in an Instagram post stating "you know it's coming..", with the lead single "Cupid's Bow" being released the following day along with the reveal of the album's title and release date. A music video for the single was released later on 11 October 2024.

In an interview with Attitude regarding the album's title, which is named after the form of slang commonly used by the gay community in Britain prior to the decriminalisation of homosexuality, Alexander explained, "I've always loved songs that play with hidden meanings, symbols and subtext. Many queer people will understand a penchant for secrets and codes, having had a backlog of thousands of years where we were unable to live openly." Discussing the language and its inspiration on the album, Alexander described it as a "guiding light" and described it as a "story that spans centuries, filled with hidden meanings and forbidden love".

On 22 November 2024, the title track was released as a promotional single alongside an accompanying music video. A second promotional single, "Archangel" was released on 13 December 2024.

On 10 January 2024, Alexander announced the single "When We Kiss". In an interview with Dork magazine, he described the track as "an epic love song that delves into the emotional turbulence of a pivotal moment in a relationship when you're unsure whether to part ways or commit to staying together forever." The song was co-written and produced with Danny Harle. He performed the song live for the first time on The Graham Norton Show. He will embark on the Up Close and Polari Tour around the UK and Europe to support the album.

== Critical reception ==
Professional ratings
Aggregate scores
Source	Rating
Metacritic	66/100
Review scores
Source	Rating
Clash	7/10
DIY	4/5 stars
The Guardian	3/5 stars
The Independent	2/5 stars
musicOMH	4/5 stars
The Telegraph	4/5 stars

Polari has received generally favourable reviews from music critics. At Metacritic, which assigns a normalised rating out of 100 to reviews from mainstream critics, the album has an average score of 66 based on six reviews.

Clash's Emma Harrison described the album as "a shimmering collection of alt-pop that is assured, vital and full of energy" and additionally calling the album "confident debut offering from Olly and is an expressive and euphoric collection of floor-filling, punchy tracks that oozes confidence, colour and charm." Writing for DIY, Otis Robinson gave the album rating 4 out 5 stars and wrote, "Polari is a feat of punchy alt-pop that embraces the resilient and immortal histories of the queer community, encapsulating Olly Alexander's alluring, informed artistry as a solo performer."

Ben Devlin from musicOMH wrote that, "while Polari might not be destined for as many accolades as the all-conquering Brat, it establishes Olly as a solo artist to be reckoned with." Neil McCormick of The Telegraph stated that "Alexander's fantastic voice is pushed to the fore, making the most of rich, appealing, high vocal tones reminiscent of Green Gartside of Scritti Politti or (in more modern terms) multi-billion streaming superstar the Weeknd. Even 'Dizzy' sounds better in this context, a breathless banger that shakes off its Eurovision failure to spin around the dancefloor once more."

== Track listing ==
All tracks are written by Olly Alexander and Danny L Harle; "Make Me a Man" written with Vince Clarke.

Polari track listing
No.	Title	Producer(s)	Length
1.	"Polari"	Danny L Harle; Cameron Gower-Poole^{[v]}	1:27
2.	"Cupid's Bow"	Harle; Finn Keane^{[a]}; Gower-Poole^{[v]}	2:51
3.	"I Know"	Harle; Gower-Poole^{[v]}	2:51
4.	"Shadow of Love"	Harle; Gower-Poole^{[v]}	3:32
5.	"Make Me a Man"	Alexander; Harle^{[c]}; Vince Clarke^{[c]}; Gower-Poole^{[v]}	3:07
6.	"Dizzy"	Harle; Keane^{[a]}; Gower-Poole^{[v]}	2:52
7.	"Archangel"	Harle; Gower-Poole^{[v]}	3:22
8.	"Miss You So Much"	Harle; Gower-Poole^{[v]}	3:24
9.	"When We Kiss"	Harle; Keane^{[a]}; Gower-Poole^{[v]}	3:32
10.	"Whisper in the Waves"	Harle; Gower-Poole^{[v]}	3:29
11.	"Beautiful"	Harle; Gower-Poole^{[v]}	2:52
12.	"Heal You"	Harle; Keane^{[a]}; Gower-Poole^{[v]}	3:12
13.	"Language"	Harle; Gower-Poole^{[v]}	3:44
Total length:			40:15

Notes

- ^{^[c]} signifies a co-producer.
- ^{^[a]} signifies an additional producer.
- ^{^[v]} signifies a vocal producer.

== Personnel ==
=== Musicians ===
- Olly Alexander – vocals
- Danny L Harle – drum programming, electric bass guitar, electric guitar, keyboards, programming, synthesizer (all tracks); double bass, percussion, rhythm programming, string arrangement (1–5, 7–13); electronic percussion, orchestra, piano, vocals (6)
- Finn Keane – drums, keyboards, programming (tracks 2, 6, 9, 12)
- Vince Clarke – acoustic guitar, drum programming, percussion (track 5)

=== Technical ===
- Matt Colton – mastering (tracks 1–5, 7–13)
- Randy Merrill – mastering (track 6)
- Eric J – mixing (tracks 1–3)
- Geoff Swan – mixing (tracks 4, 5, 7–13)
- Mark "Spike" Stent – mixing (track 6)
- Kieran Beardmore – mixing (track 6)
- Matt Wolach – mixing (track 6)

== Charts ==
Chart performance for Polari
Chart (2025)	Peak position
Belgian Albums (Ultratop Flanders)	126
Scottish Albums (Official Charts)	6
UK Albums (Official Charts)	17

== Release history ==
Release history and formats for Polari
Region	Date	Format(s)	Label(s)	Ref.
Various	7 February 2025	CD; LP; cassette	Polydor	
Various	7 February 2025	Digital download; streaming	Polydor	
