= All for You (Years & Years song) =

2018 single by Years & Years

Single by Years & Years

from the album Palo Santo
- Released: 27 June 2018
- Length: 3:39
- Label: Polydor Records
- Songwriter(s): Olly Alexander; Mark Ralph; Greg Kurstin
- Producer(s): Greg Kurstin

Years & Years singles chronology
"If You're Over Me" (2018)	"All for You" (2018)	"Play" (2018)

"All for You" is a song by British synthpop band Years & Years. It was released as a digital download and for streaming on 27 June 2018 as the third single from their second studio album Palo Santo. The song was written by Olly Alexander, Mark Ralph and Greg Kurstin.

== Background ==
Olly Alexander said the song was "one to get deep on the dance floor and release your inner demons" referring to the feeling of relief after leaving a toxic lover. Talking about the song he also said, "We have devils and angels inside of us – the person we present to the world and the one we keep to ourselves; performing has always been a way for me to explore that. In Palo Santo, all your dreams come true and sometimes those dreams are full of monsters. 'All For You' is about reflecting on a past relationship and wondering if things were ever really as you thought they were, it's about how our identities change when we love somebody."

== Music video ==
A music video to accompany the release of "All for You" was first released onto YouTube on 17 September 2018. The video was directed by Fred Rowson. Talking about the video Olly Alexander said, "I wanted the video to depict personal transformation, from a swan to a Witch to an Android and back again. The idea that there is a fixed 'authentic' you is false to me, we constantly shift and get reshaped by the people who experience us, whether we like it or not. I hope you like the video, we tried to make something that felt like a true pop video by way of planet Palo Santo, and we wanted to show you how androids are born."

== Track listing ==
Digital download – Single
No.	Title	Length
1.	"All for You"	3:39

Digital download – Remixes
No.	Title	Length
1.	"All for You" (Eden Prince Remix)	3:30
2.	"All for You" (Jynx Remix)	4:48
3.	"All for You" (Tropkillaz Remix)	3:29
4.	"All for You" (Alle Farben Remix)	3:53
5.	"All for You" (Jon Lemmon Remix)	3:58
6.	"All for You" (Going Deeper Remix)	3:30

== Personnel ==
Credits adapted from Tidal.

- Greg Kurstin – producer, composer, lyricist, associated performer, drums, music production, recording engineer, studio personnel, synthesizer
- Mark Ralph – composer, lyricist
- Olly Alexander – composer, lyricist, associated performer, vocals
- Emre Turkmen – associated performer, background vocalist
- John Davis – mastering engineer, studio personnel
- Michael Freeman – mix engineer, studio personnel
- Mike Stent – mixer, studio personnel
- Alex pasco – recording engineer, studio personnel
- Julian Burg – recording engineer, studio personnel

== Charts ==
Chart (2018)	Peak position
Belgium (Ultratip Bubbling Under Flanders)	29
Ireland (IRMA)	70
Scotland (OCC)	31
UK Singles (OCC)	47
US Hot Dance/Electronic Songs (Billboard)	29

== Certifications ==
Region	Certification	Certified units/sales
United Kingdom (BPI)	Silver	200,000^{‡}
^{‡} Sales+streaming figures based on certification alone.

== Release history ==
Region	Date	Format	Label	Ref.
Various	27 June 2018	Digital download; streaming	Polydor Records	
