= List of Billboard number-one electronic albums of 2018 =

These are the albums that reached number one on the Billboard Dance/Electronic Albums chart in 2018.

== Chart history ==
Key
| † | Indicates best-performing album of 2018 |

| Issue date | Album | Artist | Reference |
|---|---|---|---|
| January 3 | Memories...Do Not Open † | The Chainsmokers | |
| January 6 | Memories...Do Not Open † | The Chainsmokers | |
| January 13 | Memories...Do Not Open † | The Chainsmokers | |
| January 20 | Memories...Do Not Open † | The Chainsmokers | |
| January 27 | Memories...Do Not Open † | The Chainsmokers | |
| February 3 | Memories...Do Not Open † | The Chainsmokers | |
| February 10 | Common Ground | Above & Beyond | |
| February 17 | Memories...Do Not Open † | The Chainsmokers | |
| February 24 | Memories...Do Not Open † | The Chainsmokers | |
| March 3 | Memories...Do Not Open † | The Chainsmokers | |
| March 10 | Memories...Do Not Open † | The Chainsmokers | |
| March 17 | Memories...Do Not Open † | The Chainsmokers | |
| March 24 | Memories...Do Not Open † | The Chainsmokers | |
| March 31 | Memories...Do Not Open † | The Chainsmokers | |
| April 7 | Memories...Do Not Open † | The Chainsmokers | |
| April 14 | Memories...Do Not Open † | The Chainsmokers | |
| April 21 | Awake | Alison Wonderland | |
| April 28 | Memories...Do Not Open † | The Chainsmokers | |
| May 5 | True | Avicii | |
| May 12 | True | Avicii | |
| May 19 | See Without Eyes | The Glitch Mob | |
| May 26 | Memories...Do Not Open † | The Chainsmokers | |
| June 2 | Memories...Do Not Open † | The Chainsmokers | |
| June 9 | Memories...Do Not Open † | The Chainsmokers | |
| June 16 | Memories...Do Not Open † | The Chainsmokers | |
| June 23 | Memories...Do Not Open † | The Chainsmokers | |
| June 30 | Head over Heels | Chromeo | |
| July 7 | Joytime II | Marshmello | |
| July 14 | Memories...Do Not Open † | The Chainsmokers | |
| July 21 | Palo Santo | Years & Years | |
| July 28 | Memories...Do Not Open † | The Chainsmokers | |
| August 4 | Memories...Do Not Open † | The Chainsmokers | |
| August 11 | Nova | RL Grime | |
| August 18 | Memories...Do Not Open † | The Chainsmokers | |
| August 25 | Memories...Do Not Open † | The Chainsmokers | |
| September 1 | Memories...Do Not Open † | The Chainsmokers | |
| September 8 | Memories...Do Not Open † | The Chainsmokers | |
| September 15 | Memories...Do Not Open † | The Chainsmokers | |
| September 22 | Memories...Do Not Open † | The Chainsmokers | |
| September 29 | 7 | David Guetta | |
| October 6 | Sick Boy | The Chainsmokers | |
| October 13 | Sick Boy | The Chainsmokers | |
| October 20 | Sick Boy | The Chainsmokers | |
| October 27 | Sick Boy | The Chainsmokers | |
| November 3 | The Fame | Lady Gaga | |
| November 10 | Honey | Robyn | |
| November 17 | Sick Boy | The Chainsmokers | |
| November 24 | Neon Future III | Steve Aoki | |
| December 1 | Sick Boy | The Chainsmokers | |
| December 8 | Sick Boy | The Chainsmokers | |
| December 15 | What Is Love? | Clean Bandit | |
| December 22 | Sick Boy | The Chainsmokers | |
| December 29 | Sick Boy | The Chainsmokers | |
