= Palo Santo Tour =

2018–19 concert tour by Years & Years

- Tour by Years & Years
- Associated album: Palo Santo
- Start date: 24 June 2018
- End date: 31 August 2019
- Legs: 4
- No. of shows: 30 in Europe; 19 in North America; 9 in Asia; 7 in South America

Years & Years concert chronology
- Communion Tour (2015-16); Palo Santo Tour (2018-19); Night Call Tour (2022)

The Palo Santo Tour was the 2018-2019 concert tour by English synthpop band Years & Years. It was named after their second studio album, Palo Santo. The tour began in New York City at the Brooklyn Steel on 24 June 2018, and concluded in Coventry, England, on 15–16 June 2019.

On 15 October 2018, the band announced on Twitter that the last three North American dates were canceled due to "unforeseen scheduling issues", stating they hope to return again at another time.

On 15 February 2019, the band once again cancelled 4 shows in Asia due to unforeseen circumstances.

== Background and development ==
Years & Years released their second studio album Palo Santo on 6 July 2018. A week before the album release, Years & Years embarked on Palo Santo Parties in three cities in the United States. On 18 June, Years & Years announced the tour via Twitter along with the European tour dates.

== Setlist ==
North American Set List
1. "Sanctify"
2. "Take Shelter"
3. "Shine"
4. "Eyes Shut"
5. "Karma"
6. "Ties"
7. "Desire"
8. "Palo Santo"
9. "Rendezvous"
10. "Worship"
11. "Hallelujah"
12. "Gold"
13. "If You're Over Me"
14. "All For You"
15. "King"
European, South American and Asian Set List
1. "Sanctify"
2. "Shine"
3. "Karma"
4. "Meteorite"
5. "Eyes Shut"
6. "Lucky Escape"
7. "Gold"
8. "Desire"
9. "Palo Santo"
10. "Ties"
11. "Preacher"
12. "Hallelujah"
13. "No Tears Left to Cry"/"Like a Prayer" (Ariana Grande/Madonna covers) - performed by backing singers
14. "Worship"
15. "Rendezvous"
16. "If You're Over Me"
17. "All For You"
18. "Play"
19. "King"

== Tour dates ==
List of concerts, showing date, city, country, venue and opening acts
Date	City	Country	Venue	Opening acts	
North America
June 24, 2018	New York City	United States	Brooklyn Steel	—N/a	
June 27, 2018	San Francisco	United States	Regency Ballroom	—N/a	
June 28, 2018	Los Angeles	United States	The Belasco Theatre	Jess Kent	
Europe
July 22, 2018 (Note: The concert on 22 July 2018 at Longchamp Racecourse in Paris was part of Lollapalooza Paris.)	Paris	France	Longchamp Racecourse	—N/a	
Asia
July 27, 2018 (Note: The concert on 27 July 2018 at Naeba Ski Resort in Niigata was part of Fuji Rock Festival.)	Niigata	Japan	Naeba Ski Resort	—N/a	
July 29, 2018	Seoul	South Korea	Yes24 Live Music Hall	—N/a	
Europe
August 11, 2018 (Note: The concert on 11 August 2018 at Watergate Bay in Newquay was part of Boardmasters Festival.)	Newquay	England	Watergate Bay	—N/a	
August 18, 2018 (Note: The concert on 18 August 2018 at Hylands Park in Chlemsford was part of RiZE Festival.)	Chelmsford	England	Hylands Park	—N/a	
August 26, 2018 (Note: The concert on 26 August 2018 at Southsea Common in Portsmouth was part of Victorious Festival.)	Portsmouth	England	Southsea Common	—N/a	
September 2, 2018 (Note: The concert on 2 September 2018 at Otterspool Promenade in Liverpool was part of Fusion Festival UK.)	Liverpool	England	Otterspool Promenade	—N/a	
September 8, 2018 (Note: The concert on 8 September 2018 at Olympiapark in Berlin was part of Lollapalooza Berlin.)	Berlin	Germany	Olympiapark	—N/a	
North America
October 5, 2018	Toronto	Canada	Phoenix Concert Theatre	Jess Kent	
October 6, 2018	Pittsburgh	United States	Stage AE	CYN; Jess Kent	
October 8, 2018	New York	United States	Terminal 5	—N/a	
October 10, 2018	Philadelphia	United States	The Fillmore	CYN	
October 11, 2018	Washington D.C.	United States	Lincoln Theatre	CYN	
October 12, 2018	Boston	United States	Paradise Rock Club	CYN; Jess Kent	
October 13, 2018	Montreal	Canada	M Telus	CYN; Jess Kent	
October 15, 2018	Chicago	United States	The Vic Theatre	CYN; Jess Kent	
October 16, 2018	Minneapolis	United States	First Avenue	CYN	
October 18, 2018	Kansas City	United States	The Truman	CYN; Jess Kent	
October 19, 2018	Dallas	United States	Canton Hall	CYN	
October 20, 2018	Austin	United States	Emo's	Jess Kent	
October 22, 2018	Denver	United States	Ogden Theatre	CYN; Jess Kent	
October 23, 2018	Salt Lake City	United States	Union Event Center	CYN	
October 25, 2018	Los Angeles	United States	The Wiltern	CYN; Jess Kent	
October 26, 2018	San Francisco	United States	Warfield Theatre	Jess Kent	
Europe
November 28, 2018	Glasgow	Scotland	SSE Hydro	Astrid S	
November 29, 2018	Manchester	England	O_{2} Apollo	Astrid S	
November 30, 2018	Birmingham	England	Arena Birmingham	Astrid S	
December 2, 2018	Manchester	England	O_{2} Apollo	Astrid S	
December 4, 2018	Brighton	England	Brighton Centre	Astrid S	
December 5, 2018	London	England	The O_{2} Arena	Astrid S	Kiki's House of Tea Rina Sawayama
January 21, 2019	Dublin	Ireland	Olympia Theatre	—N/a	
January 22, 2019	Dublin	Ireland	Olympia Theatre	—N/a	
January 24, 2019	Paris	France	Pleyel	—N/a	
January 25, 2019	Amsterdam	Netherlands	AFAS Live	—N/a	
January 26, 2019	Hamburg	Germany	Sporthalle	—N/a	
January 28, 2019	Copenhagen	Denmark	K.B. Hallen	—N/a	
January 29, 2019	Oslo	Norway	Sentrum Scene	—N/a	
January 30, 2019	Stockholm	Sweden	Annexet	—N/a	
February 1, 2019	Warsaw	Poland	Torwar Hall	—N/a	
February 2, 2019	Berlin	Germany	Columbiahalle	—N/a	
February 3, 2019	Munich	Germany	Zenith	—N/a	
February 4, 2019	Milan	Italy	Fabrique	—N/a	
February 6, 2019	Cologne	Germany	Palladium	—N/a	
February 7, 2019	Antwerp	Belgium	Lotto Arena	—N/a	
February 14, 2019	Kyiv	Ukraine	Stereoplaza	—N/a	
February 16, 2019	Moscow	Russia	Adrenaline Stadium	—N/a	
February 17, 2019	St. Petersburg	Russia	A2	—N/a	
Asia				—N/a	
March 5, 2019	Taipei	Taiwan	Legacy Taipei	—N/a	
March 7, 2019	Osaka	Japan	Big Cat	—N/a	
March 8, 2019	Tokyo	Japan	Toyosu Pit	—N/a	
March 10, 2019	Seoul	South Korea	Bluesquare Market Hall	—N/a	
South America
March 27, 2019	Buenos Aires	Argentina	Niceto Club	Pyura	
March 29, 2019 (Note: The concert on 29 March 2019 at Hipódromo de San Isidro in Buenos Aires was part of Lollapalooza Argentina)	Buenos Aires	Argentina	Hipódromo de San Isidro	—N/a	
March 30, 2019 (Note: The concert on 30 March 2019 at Parque O'Higgins in Santiago was part of Lollapalooza Chile)	Santiago	Chile	Parque O'Higgins	—N/a	
April 1, 2019	Santiago	Chile	Teatro Teletón	—N/a	
April 4, 2019	Bogotá	Colombia	Armando Music Hall	Ximena Sariñana. Guest artists: Juan Pablo Vega and Esteman	
April 5, 2019 (Note: The concert on 5 April 2019 at Parque Deportivo 222 in Bogotá was part of Estéreo Picnic Festival.)	Bogotá	Colombia	Parque Deportivo 222	—N/a	
April 7, 2019 (Note: The concert on 7 April 2019 at Autódromo de Interlagos in São Paulo was part of Lollapalooza Brazil.)	São Paulo	Brazil	Autódromo de Interlagos	—N/a	
Europe
June 16, 2019 (Note: The concert on 16 June 2019 at Ricoh Arena in Coventry was part of Midlands Festival.)	Coventry	England	Ricoh Arena	—N/a	
June 28, 2019 (Note: The concert on 28 June 2019 at Festivalpark Werchter in Werchter was part of Rock Werchter.)	Werchter	Belgium	Festival Park Werchter	—N/a	
June 30, 2019 (Note: The concert on 30 June 2019 at Worthy Farm in Pilton was part of Glastonbury Festival)	Pilton	England	Worthy Farm	—N/a	
July 6, 2019 (Note: The concert on 6 July 2019 at Parc del Fòrum in Barcelona was part of Festival Cruïlla Barcelona)	Barcelona	Spain	Parc del Fòrum	—N/a	
July 20, 2019	Scarborough	England	Scarborough Open Air Theatre	—N/a	
August 31, 2019 (Note: The concert on 31 August 2019 at Stradbally Hall in Stradbally was part of Electric Picnic)	Stradbally	Ireland	Stradbally Hall	—N/a	

== Cancelled shows ==
Date	City	Country	Venue	Reason
28 October 2018	Portland	United States	Crystal Ballroom	Scheduling conflicts
29 October 2018	Vancouver	Canada	Commodore Ballroom	Scheduling conflicts
30 October 2018	Seattle	United States	The Showbox	Scheduling conflicts
23 February 2019 (Note: The concert on 23 February 2019 at Orchid Forest in Lembang was going to be part of LaLaLa Festival.)	Lembang	Indonesia	Orchid Forest	Unforeseen circumstances
25 February 2019	Manila	Philippines	New Frontier Theater	Unforeseen circumstances
27 February 2019	Singapore	Singapore	Star Theatre	Unforeseen circumstances
1 March 2019	Bangkok	Thailand	GMM Live Hall, Central World	Unforeseen circumstances
3 March 2019	Hong Kong	Hong Kong	KITEC Rotunda 3	Unforeseen circumstances
