= Sanctify (song) =

Single by Olly Alexander (Years & Years)

from the album Palo Santo
- Released: 7 March 2018
- Recorded: 2017
- Genre: Dance; dark pop; pop; R&B
- Length: 3:09
- Label: Polydor
- Songwriters: Olly Alexander; Tom Hull
- Producer: Kid Harpoon

Olly Alexander (Years & Years) singles chronology
"Meteorite" (2016)	"Sanctify" (2018)	"If You're Over Me" (2018)

Music video
- "Sanctify" on YouTube

"Sanctify" is a song recorded by British synthpop band Years & Years. Written by Olly Alexander and its producer Kid Harpoon, it was released on 7 March 2018 by Polydor Records, as the lead single from the band's second studio album, Palo Santo (2018). It was voted as the 3rd hottest record of the year 2018 as part of Annie Mac's hottest record of the year.

== Release and background ==
The band first teased the song via social media on 16 February 2018, with a cryptic video featuring a grainy footage of their "King" music video as well as ideograms, leading to speculation of an upcoming announcement. They later shared another video featuring a picture of lead singer Olly Alexander that encouraged fans to sign up to their mailing list. Their website, which was linked in the video captions, also hinted that something was "coming soon". On 2 March 2018, the band posted a video which revealed the song's title and release details.

According to Nylon, "Sanctify" was inspired by Alexander's relationship with a straight man, in which "things became chaotic at a certain point". He explained: "There's so much that goes on in an experience like that. On the one hand, the guy is struggling with his sexuality and feeling unable to express himself as anything other than straight while also desiring me. I'm on the other side feeling like both a sinner and saint or a devil and angel, leading this guy down a path of 'sinfulness' while, at the same time, helping him explore his sexuality." The band's older songs "have been about [Alexander] and [his] life", but "Sanctify" was referred to as one of the "more sexually overt songs". Alexander stated that he has "felt more empowered to be even more confessional in [his] writing" and is "not shying away from certain topics anymore". He concluded by saying: "I feel like being gay is a blessing. I wanted that to come through in the song."

== Composition ==
"Sanctify" is a BDSM-referencing dance, dark pop, pop and R&B song, with early 2000s pop music influences. Alexander told Beats 1: "Then the music side of it, I wanted something that felt like it could be Britney-era 'Slave 4 U' meets Timbaland or Neptunes... that's my favorite kind of stuff to listen to." He added in an interview with Capital: "When we were making it, it just sounded like a really nice blend of my favourite kind of old skool RnB, but also felt kinda fresh, so it felt like the best foot forward."

== Music video ==
The accompanying music video was directed by Fred Rowson. It was situated in an imaginary future metropolis called Palo Santo, where people are captured and made to dance as a form of entertainment for androids. It began with Alexander being taken to an audition. At first, he is restrained by a cuff around his neck. After it releases, he dances and emotes more freely. Alexander revealed in a press release: "It's the first part of a bigger jigsaw puzzle and my hope is that it confuses the hell out of people but also excites them in a mysterious and sensual way. We've deliberately hidden lots of different meanings and I want people to come up with their own interpretations, I'm asking people to jump down the rabbit hole with me and let their imagination run free."

== Live performances ==
Olly Alexander performed "Sanctify" on the opening episode of the second series of Sounds Like Friday Night on 6 April 2018 alongside an acoustic performance of "King". The song was subsequently included as the opening number on the band's Palo Santo Tour and was performed as part of their set on the Pyramid Stage at the 2019 Glastonbury Festival. The song was also featured in the setlist of Alexander's 2022 Night Call Tour in a section of the show which also included "Worship", "Rendezvous" and "Desire".

== Critical reception ==
Robin Murray of Clash regarded the song as a piece of "potent, poised pop music" which "embraces creativity as a realm for reinvention". Bianca Gracie of Fuse felt that the song indicates "an unexpected but thrilling sonic direction", writing that it "takes a much sharper turn into dark-pop territory". Philip Cosores of Uproxx opined that it "sounds decidedly more Justin [Bieber]", despite Alexander's claim of Spears influences, "but either way, the pop bona fides of the track can't be denied".

== Track listing ==
- Digital download – remixes
1. "Sanctify" (Remix) (featuring ALMA) – 3:10
2. "Sanctify" (Bernard Sumner / New Order Remix) – 4:11
3. "Sanctify" (Vato Gonzalez Remix) – 4:07
4. "Sanctify" (Gerd Janson Remix / Radio Edit) – 4:10
5. "Sanctify" (Michael Calfan's Prayer Remix) – 2:51

== Credits and personnel ==
Credits adapted from Tidal.

- Olly Alexander – composition, vocals
- Kid Harpoon – composition, production
- John Davis – master engineering
- Michael Freeman – engineering
- Spike Stent – mixing

== Charts ==
Chart (2018)	Peak position
Belgium (Ultratop 50 Flanders)	47
Belgium (Ultratip Bubbling Under Wallonia)	3
Czech Republic (Singles Digitál Top 100)	77
Hungary (Stream Top 40)	34
Ireland (IRMA)	57
New Zealand Heatseekers (RMNZ)	5
Scotland Singles (OCC)	16
UK Singles (OCC)	25
US Hot Dance/Electronic Songs (Billboard)	19

== Certifications ==
Region	Certification	Certified units/sales
Brazil (Pro-Música Brasil)	Gold	20,000^{‡}
Poland (ZPAV)	Gold	10,000^{‡}
^{‡} Sales+streaming figures based on certification alone.
