= If You're Over Me =

Single by Olly Alexander (Years & Years)

from the album Palo Santo
- Released: 10 May 2018
- Genre: Bubblegum pop
- Length: 3:09
- Label: Polydor
- Songwriter(s): Olly Alexander; Steve Mac
- Producer(s): Steve Mac

Olly Alexander (Years & Years) singles chronology
"Sanctify" (2018)	"If You're Over Me" (2018)	"All for You" (2018)

Music video
- "If You're Over Me" on YouTube

"If You're Over Me" is a song recorded by British synthpop band Years & Years. Written by Olly Alexander and its producer Steve Mac, it was released on 10 May 2018 by Polydor Records, as the second single from the band's second studio album, Palo Santo (2018). The music video was directed by Fred Rowson with choreography by Aaron Sillis. The song was performed live on both the Palo Santo Tour and the Night Call Tour.

On 5 August 2022, "If You're Over Me" was certified double platinum by the British Phonographic Industry (BPI). The song has spent a total of 23 weeks on the UK Singles Chart.

== Track listing ==
- Digital download
1. "If You're Over Me" – 3:09
- Digital download – acoustic
1. "If You're Over Me" (Acoustic) – 3:09
- Digital download – remixes
1. "If You're Over Me" (Paul Woolford Remix) – 3:51
2. "If You're Over Me" (NOTD Remix) – 3:30
3. "If You're Over Me" (Sebastian Perez Remix) – 3:40
4. "If You're Over Me" (DECCO Remix) – 2:59
5. "If You're Over Me" (Tom & Collins Remix) – 3:25
- Digital download – remix
1. "If You're Over Me" (Remix featuring Key) – 3:07

== Charts ==
=== Weekly charts ===
Chart (2018)	Peak position
Belgium (Ultratop 50 Flanders)	50
Czech Republic (Rádio – Top 100)	53
Czech Republic (Singles Digitál Top 100)	54
Euro Digital Songs (Billboard)	6
Ireland (IRMA)	7
Japan (Japan Hot 100)	65
Mexico Ingles Airplay (Billboard)	42
Poland (Polish Airplay Top 100)	18
Scotland (OCC)	4
Sweden (Sverigetopplistan)	43
UK Singles (OCC)	6
US Hot Dance/Electronic Songs (Billboard)	16

=== Year-end charts ===
Chart (2018)	Position
UK Singles (Official Charts Company)	45
US Hot Dance/Electronic Songs (Billboard)	55

== Certifications ==
Region	Certification	Certified units/sales
Brazil (Pro-Música Brasil)	Gold	20,000^{‡}
Denmark (IFPI Danmark)	Gold	45,000^{‡}
Poland (ZPAV)	Gold	10,000^{‡}
United Kingdom (BPI)	2× Platinum	1,200,000^{‡}
^{‡} Sales+streaming figures based on certification alone.
