= Dizzy (Olly Alexander song) =

2024 song by Olly Alexander

Single by Olly Alexander

from the album Odyssey and Polari
- Written: 2023
- Released: 1 March 2024
- Genre: Pop; electro; dance-pop; disco
- Length: 2:52 (original version); 3:00 (Eurovision version)
- Label: Polydor
- Songwriters: Oliver Alexander Thornton; Daniel Harle
- Producers: Finn Keane; Daniel Harle

Olly Alexander singles chronology
| "A Very Bad Fun Idea" (2023) | "Dizzy" (2024) | "Kite" (2024) |

Music video
- "Dizzy" on YouTube

Eurovision Song Contest 2024 entry
- Country: United Kingdom
- Artist: Olly Alexander
- Language: English
- Composers: Oliver Alexander Thornton; Daniel Harle
- Lyricists: Oliver Alexander Thornton; Daniel Harle

Finals performance
- Final result: 18th
- Final points: 46

Entry chronology
- ◄ "I Wrote a Song" (2023)
- "What the Hell Just Happened?" (2025) ►

Official performance video
- "Dizzy" (First Semi-Final) on YouTube "Dizzy" (Grand Final) on YouTube

"Dizzy" is a song by British singer-songwriter and actor Olly Alexander. It was released on 1 March 2024 through Polydor Records, and was written by Alexander and Daniel Harle. The song marked Alexander's first release under his own name after the dissolution of Years & Years. It represented the United Kingdom at the Eurovision Song Contest 2024, where it placed 18th with 46 points at the grand final. It was later included on the track listing for Alexander's debut album, Polari.

"Dizzy" is a love song where Alexander wants his lover to give him kisses over and over to make him feel "dizzy". The song was met with mixed reception by both British and international media upon its release, with some praise given for Alexander's vocal abilities and its retro musical composition. However, criticism was also levied against the song for being viewed as too conventional for a chance of victory at the Eurovision Song Contest.

== Background and composition ==
"Dizzy" was written by Oliver Alexander Thornton and Daniel Harle, and marked the first single after Alexander's departure from Years & Years. The song was written in the summer of 2023, with Alexander stating in NME, "we started off with the word ‘Dizzy’ because it just popped into my head... I was thinking about fun things that could make you dizzy and I remember saying ‘dizzy from your kisses’ so we built the song around that." Alexander later stated that Harle convinced him to apply the Eurovision Song Contest, eventually sending "a few" songs to the British Broadcasting Corporation (BBC) for them to pick his song for the Eurovision Song Contest, with the BBC picking "Dizzy".

In interviews, Alexander described the setting of the song to be a "magical place where you're in love with someone, there are flowers everywhere and you're just like, you're dizzy". He further added his intents that the song "should take you on a journey... the song is about the overwhelming feeling you get when you’re with someone". In an analysis by Wiwibloggs' Lucy Percy, they described the lyrics representing "Olly being so enamoured with his lover that their kisses literally make him dizzy". References to time are frequently made within the song, with Olly "want[ing] to stop, start over and feel that sensation again... this embrace will last forever and he never wants to be pulled away". Alexander also mentioned that Greek tragedies and medieval poetry, some of Alexander and Harle's favourite "references", influenced the creation of the song.

== Music video and release ==
Along with the song's release, an accompanying music video was released on the same day, premiering on a special BBC Eurovision broadcast titled Graham Meets Olly. Directed by Colin Solal Cardo, it was filmed in Tbilisi, Georgia. Later that evening, Alexander appeared on a special broadcast on BBC One, titled Graham Meets Olly, which featured the first full televised broadcast of the music video. In the video, Alexander performs inside of a house, later entering a garden. Writing for Metro, Brooke Ivey Johnson stated the video "reflects the song's theme of all-consuming love". Sky News' Rachel McGrath described it as "head-spinning", while in a review for The Guardian, Laura Snapes dubbed the video "nauseatingly topsy-turvy".

== Promotion ==
To promote the song in the months heading into Eurovision, he made appearances on several British radio stations and television shows. Alexander made appearances on BBC Radio 1 and BBC Radio 2 on 1 March, with "Dizzy" making its radio premiere on The Radio 2 Breakfast Show. A week later, he made two consecutive live performances on Live from Vevo Studio and on Ant & Dec's Saturday Night Takeaway on 8 and 9 March 2024. In April, he made his first appearance in the United States, with him being honored as a guest on The Kelly Clarkson Show. On 2 May, he made a cameo on the BBC soap opera, EastEnders. Alexander also performed at various Eurovision pre-parties throughout the months of March and April 2024, including Pre-Party ES on 30 March, the London Eurovision Party on 7 April, Eurovision in Concert on 13 April, and the Nordic Eurovision Party on 14 April.

== Critical reception ==
=== British media and personalities ===
Professional ratings
Review scores
| Source | Rating |
|---|---|
| The Independent | 3/5 stars |
| The Guardian | 3/5 stars |
| The Daily Telegraph | 3/5 stars |
| The Times | 5/5 stars |
| iNews | 2/5 stars |

"Dizzy" was met with mixed reviews from British music critics. Roisin O'Connor from The Independent wrote that "'Dizzy' is a dance anthem that takes its cues from Pet Shop Boys, Erasure, and Bronski Beat – whisked up with the ripe diet of Nineties cheese-pop that Alexander grew up on". Laura Snapes from The Guardian stated that the chorus echoes that of the 1987 single "It's a Sin" by Pet Shop Boys, while also making comparisons to Dead or Alive single "You Spin Me Round (Like a Record)". They concluded that "'Dizzy' isn't a bad song – it's perfectly fine – but beyond its very literal, nauseatingly topsy-turvy video, it's far too safe to leave anyone reeling".

Writing for The Daily Telegraph, Neil McCormick wrote "'Dizzy' is an interesting modern electronic dance pop song, a blend of Balearic beats and sugary sentiments delivering upbeat sentiments with a minor chord melodic tension". While writing for Clash, Robin Murray described "it's as a full-blown extravaganza. Olly lives and breathes every word, with the ultra-catchy dose of future-facing pop digitalism leaning on his fantastic vocals.

In a review for The Times, Will Hodgkinson described it as a "super-catchy and hi-energy disco smash that has real innovation in its burbling production”. It also has “pleasingly nostalgic shades of classic Eighties synth-pop: Erasure, Soft Cell and, yes, Pet Shop Boys". He referred to it as "the best Eurovision entry we've had in years". In a review for PinkNews, Marcus Wratten said "'Dizzy' is one of the better songs the UK has sent to the contest in recent years". They further added, "it's pulsating pop that is both simple yet effective. The fizzy '80s synths of Pet Shop Boys are a clear influence, but with a touch of Steps' playfulness, and – dare we say it – a hint of Aqua, too. That's all to say that 'Dizzy' is pop serving its primary purpose; it's catchy and the hook has sticking power".

Writing for BBC News, Mark Savage dubbed the song "a sleek, streamlined slice of modern pop" with an "instantly memorable" hook, but criticised the strength of the song, adding: "If there's a criticism, it's that the song could go harder. Instead of building to a climax, that final chorus is too polite". i's Ed Power described the song as "a drearily orthodox Euro-banger" that "plays it safe", concluding that "Alexander and Harle are clearly capable of so much better" but "have gone risk-averse".

=== Eurovision-related and other media ===
In a Wiwibloggs review containing several reviews from several critics, the song was rated 6.73 out of 10 points, earning 16th out of 37 songs on the site's annual ranking. ESC Beat's Doron Lahav ranked the song 35th overall, writing that " I think the arrangement of the song is quite problematic... Starting from a certain point, it repeats again and again and is quite repititive [sic]". Vulture's Jon O'Brien ranked it ninth overall, stating that while he thought the song as "immaculately produced", he admitted that "it might just be a little too subtle to connect widely on first listen". Erin Adam of The Scotsman rated the song six out of 10 points, stating that they thought that it was "underwhelming compared to many in the contest".

== Eurovision Song Contest ==
=== Internal selection ===
The United Kingdom's broadcaster for the Eurovision Song Contest, the British Broadcasting Corporation (BBC), officially announced their intentions to participate in the Eurovision Song Contest 2024 on 18 October 2023, when they announced that a team led by BBC Music's Lee Smithurst and Will Wilkin had begun searching for an artist to represent the country over the summer of that year. Within the month, Olly Alexander was selected, with him being confirmed as the United Kingdom's representative on 16 December during the final of Strictly Come Dancing.

=== At Eurovision ===
The Eurovision Song Contest 2024 took place at the Malmö Arena in Malmö, Sweden, and consisted of two semi-finals held on the respective dates of 7 and 9 May and the final on 11 May 2024. As the United Kingdom was a member of the "Big Five", Alexander automatically qualified for the grand final. He was later drawn to perform in the first half of the grand final. Before the contest, Alexander faced numerous calls to withdraw due to the participation of Israel amongst the Gaza war. Days before the contest, Alexander affirmed his intents to participate and expressed distress at the protests, claiming he was "trying not to have a breakdown" and that he felt "ashamed of [himself] and embarrassed" due to the protests. He later added his thought that withdrawing would not "make a difference" regarding humanitarian and hostage crises in the war. He also signed a letter along with eight other Eurovision 2024 artists that called for "an immediate and lasting ceasefire, and the safe return of all hostages".

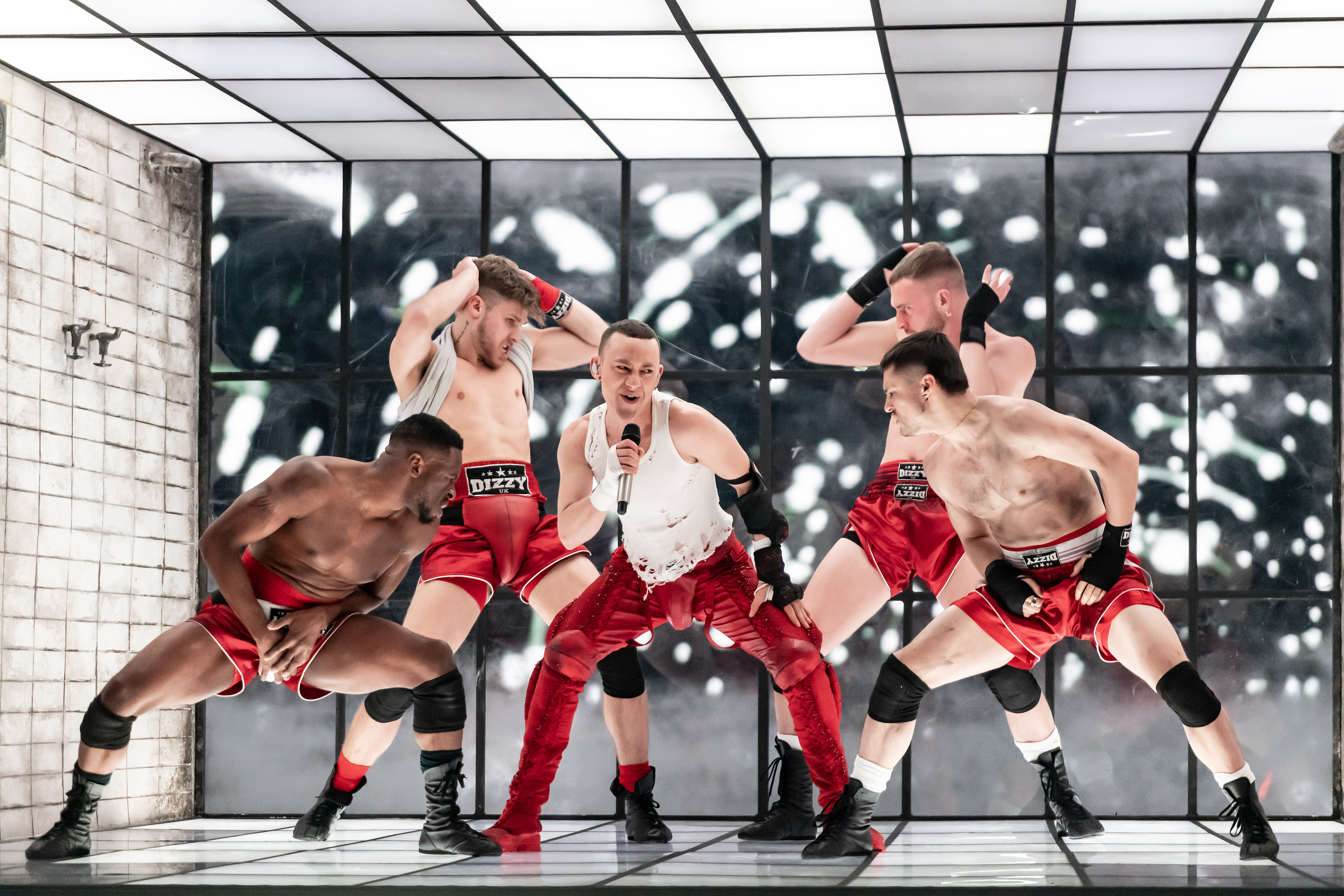
Olly Alexander performing "Dizzy" at a dress rehearsal before the Eurovision Song Contest 2024.

For its Eurovision performance, "Dizzy" was revamped, which included an "orchestra style build into the final chorus". Before the contest, Alexander stated intentions for the performance to be "quite gritty". The performance featured Alexander in a white, ripped t-shirt and red trousers along with four backing dancers, all wearing red boxing clothes. The setting around the performance was described as a "post-apocalyptic dystopian boxing gym locker room, aboard a spaceship hurtling toward Earth through a black hole in 1985". The locker room itself was remarked as dirty; according to Alexander, he chose the setting of a locker room to incorporate "queerness" into his performance, stating in PinkNews, "I plan to be as gay as possible – and what’s gayer than a locker room?" It also featured shots of the room being upside-down and "cameras rotating to give a spinning feel to Alexander and the dancers". Nearing the end of the performance, all five performers head out of the locker room.

The performance was met with mixed reception according to Emma Guinness of The Independent. Graham Norton, the British commentator for the Eurovision Song Contest, proclaimed that he thought the staging for the performance was the "best staging possibly [the United Kingdom has] ever done". In contrast, Gareth Roberts of Spiked stated that Alexander's performance was based on the cliches of gay pornography. "I do find it boring and embarrassing... It’s meant to be enlightening and empowering, but it’s depressing," he said. Roberts later added that he thought that the performance represented the "devolution" of Alexander due to him being "brainwashed" by "LGBTQ+ Central". Philip Oltermann, writer for The Guardian, wrote that the performance was "not especially risky: there was no sense that this particular performer was taking a punt at the risk of making a fool of himself on the night".

After the results were announced, Alexander finished in 18th with 46 points, with a split score of 46 points from juries and zero points from public televoting. No sets of the maximum 12 points were awarded for the song; the most a country gave towards it was eight, given by Iceland and Sweden. Alexander's final result, particularly his public televote result, was met with disappointment by British media and personalities. The Daily Telegraph's Liam Kelly proclaimed that Alexander's result, along with his actions and activism at the contest had "alienated everybody: his die-hard liberal fans are disappointed he didn’t speak out about Israel; while mainstream viewers may have been put off by his vow to 'fly the flag for the country in the gayest way possible'”. The Guardian's Michael Hogan declared that a combination of factors, including the "edgy" staging, sound issues, the song itself, and "our unpopularity post-Brexit" contributed to the poor public televoting result. David Thornton, Olly's father, expressed surprise at the result, stating in the BBC that "to me it's a real surprise the public didn't sort of connect with that song". In response to his result, Alexander stated happiness at having a chance to compete in the contest, stating, "Though we may have received NIL Points from the voting public (which I shall be claiming as iconic!), I’ve also seen a lot of love and i’m truly grateful [sic]".

== Credits and personnel ==
Credits are adapted from Apple Music.

- Danny L Harle – producer, songwriter, keyboards, piano, electronic percussion, drum machine, electric guitar, electric bass guitar
- Finn Keane – producer, keyboards, programming, drums
- Olly Alexander – songwriter
- Cameron Gower Poole – vocal producer
- Mark "Spike" Stent – mixing engineer
- Randy Merrill – mastering engineer

== Track listing ==
Digital download/streaming

1. "Dizzy" – 2:52

Digital download/streaming – extended mix

1. "Dizzy (extended mix)" – 4:41
2. "Dizzy" – 2:52

Digital download/streaming – Lizot remix

1. "Dizzy (Lizot remix)" – 2:15
2. "Dizzy" – 2:52

Digital download/streaming – Prezioso remix

1. "Dizzy (Prezioso remix)" – 2:29
2. "Dizzy" – 2:52

Digital download/streaming – Monss remix

1. "Dizzy (Monss remix)" – 2:51
2. "Dizzy" – 2:52

Digital download/streaming – acoustic version

1. "Dizzy (acoustic)" – 3:35
2. "Dizzy" – 2:52

Digital download/streaming – Essel remix

1. "Dizzy (Essel remix)" – 3:41
2. "Dizzy" – 2:52

Digital download/streaming – performance version

1. "Dizzy (performance version)" – 3:00
2. "Dizzy" – 2:52

Digital download/streaming – D.O.D remix

1. "Dizzy (D.O.D remix)" – 2:30
2. "Dizzy" – 2:52

7-inch vinyl, CD single

1. "Dizzy" – 2:52
2. "Dizzy (extended mix)" – 4:41

Digital download/streaming – Ben Nicky remix

1. "Dizzy (Ben Nicky remix)" – 2:33
2. "Dizzy" – 2:52

== Charts ==
Chart performance for "Dizzy"
| Chart (2024) | Peak position |
|---|---|
| Greece International (IFPI) | 59 |
| Lithuania (AGATA) | 12 |
| Lithuania Airplay (TopHit) | 47 |
| South Korea BGM (Circle) | 98 |
| Sweden Heatseeker (Sverigetopplistan) | 1 |
| UK Singles (OCC) | 42 |

== Release history ==
Release dates and formats for "Dizzy"
| Region | Date | Format | Version | Label | Ref. |
|---|---|---|---|---|---|
| Various | 1 March 2024 | Digital download; streaming | Single | Polydor | |
| Italy | 1 March 2024 | Radio airplay | Single | Universal | |
| Various | 15 March 2024 | Digital download; streaming | Extended | Universal | |
| Various | 29 March 2024 | Digital download; streaming | Lizot remix | Universal | |
| Various | 5 April 2024 | Digital download; streaming | Prezioso remix | Polydor | |
| Various | 19 April 2024 | Digital download; streaming | Monss remix | Polydor | |
| Various | 26 April 2024 | Digital download; streaming | Acoustic | Polydor | |
| Various | 26 April 2024 | Digital download; streaming | Essel remix | Polydor | |
| Various | 7 May 2024 | Digital download; streaming | Performance | Polydor | |
| Various | 10 May 2024 | Digital download; streaming | D.O.D remix | Polydor | |
| Various | 10 May 2024 | 7"; CD | Original; extended | Polydor | |
| Various | 10 May 2024 | Spinner USB | Original; extended; exclusive video content | Polydor | |
| Various | 17 May 2024 | Digital download; streaming | Ben Nicky remix | Polydor | |
