= Palo Santo (Years & Years album) =

Studio album by Years & Years
- Released: 6 July 2018
- Recorded: 2016–2018
- Genres: Dance-pop; electropop
- Length: 36:49
- Label: Polydor
- Producers: Years & Years; Clarence Coffee Jr.; John Foyle; Grades; Kid Harpoon; Greg Kurstin; Steve Mac; Mark Ralph; Jesse Shatkin; Two Inch Punch; MNEK

Years & Years chronology
Communion (2015)	Palo Santo (2018)	Night Call (2022)

Singles from Palo Santo
- 1. "Sanctify" Released: 7 March 2018; 2. "If You're Over Me" Released: 10 May 2018; 3. "All for You" Released: 27 June 2018; 4. "Play" Released: 28 November 2018; 5. "Valentino" Released: 15 February 2019

Palo Santo is the second studio album by the English electronic trio Years & Years, released by Polydor Records on 6 July 2018. Executive produced by the band, it is the follow-up to their debut album Communion (2015). After the success of their Communion, the trio felt pressured in making their sophomore record. Influenced by religion and spirituality, lead singer and principal songwriter Olly Alexander wanted to connect religious transcendence to pop music after perceiving parallels between a church's sense of belonging and gay nightclubs. The trio met with frequent and new collaborators such as Mark Ralph, Greg Kurstin, Steve Mac and Jesse Shatkin to produce most its tracks. Named after the South American "palo santo" (Spanish for "holy wood"), which was commonly used to fend off bad spirits, though Alexander used its name as a dick joke referring to men he knew. It is the group's last album as a trio.

Palo Santo is a concept album, set in the titular fictional world, where traditional rules regarding gender and sexuality are nonexistent. Its lyrical content deals with "the murky, complicated side" of desire, as well as the connection between religion and carnality, using religious iconography in dealing with themes of sexuality, queerness and guilt. Its visual imagery took inspirations from science fiction and technology where androids yearn to experience emotion. Sonically, the album is a dance-pop and electropop record influenced by 1990s pop and R&B music. Palo Santo's release was accompanied by a short film of the same name. Its promotional campaign features a single aesthetic of a dystopian future in Palo Santo, both of which were prominently used for the album and its accompanying film.

Upon its release, Palo Santo received widespread praise from music critics, some of whom lauded its deeper emotional resonance compared to its predecessor, Alexander's refusal to embrace moral didacticism and his vibrant display of character. Commercially, the album debuted at number three the UK Albums Chart and became the band's second album to top the Billboard Dance/Electronic Albums chart. Five singles were released from the album: "Sanctify", "If You're Over Me", "All for You", "Play" and "Valentino" with "Sanctify", "If You're Over Me" and "Play" making the top forty on the UK Singles Chart, and "If You're Over Me" and "Play" became top ten hits. The trio supported the album with the Palo Santo Tour, which commenced in October 2018 in North America and ended in June 2019 in England.

== Background and recording ==
After the release of their debut studio album Communion (2015), the trio (Olly Alexander, Michael Goldsworthy, Emre Türkmen) were under pressure to duplicate its success in making their next record. Complications arose when Alexander had a highly publicised breakup with Neil Amin-Smith, who was at the time a violinist in the British band Clean Bandit. Alexander reflected that it was a completely different situation from recording Communion, explaining that "Because on your first album, you basically have your entire life to make that record because, you know, you've got so much time and so many experiences and you've never made one before." Executives at Polydor Records recommended him to "guest on some dance hits, buoy the band's profile, and play the Spotify game", but the trio focused on producing the album instead. Alexander also reflected that immediately following the conclusion of their tour supporting Communion, they only had 18 months to finish the next album. He recalled of the limited time frame, "it went by so fast. I definitely felt it was quite overwhelming thinking, 'Oh, we're never going to be able to pull this off,' and at times it was a real struggle." He met with various songwriters, such as Julia Michaels and Justin Tranter, as well as Greg Kurstin and Mark Ralph, who had previously contributed to Communion.

== Composition ==
=== Themes and influences ===
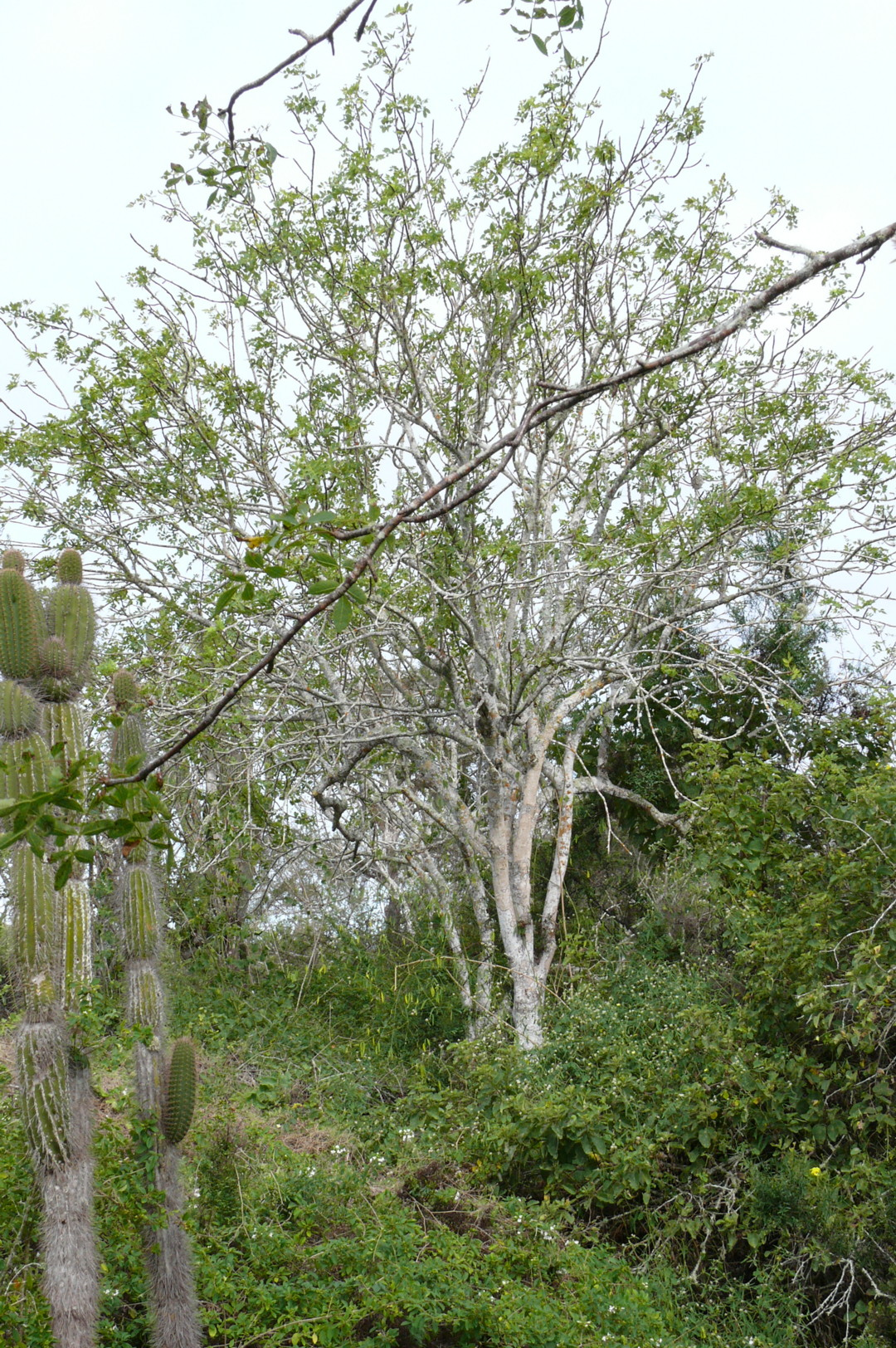
The title of the album is named after the "palo santo" wood (pictured). Endemic to South America, it is mainly used to cast off bad spirits or energy.

Palo Santo draws influence from images of spirituality and religion, also prominent themes in the band's previous work. It was named after the South American-endemic wood palo santo (Bursera graveolens, Spanish for "holy wood"), which was used as an incense by the Incas to cast off bad spirits. Pitchfork contributor Cameron Cook suggested it may have been influenced by the fact that dancing is considered the "devil's work" in most Western theologies, and that there was a thrill in shaking one's "blasphemous hips while invoking the Lord". He also pointed out that to the band's impulse to connect pop music with religious transcendence was a "sacred experience" to Alexander, its principal songwriter. Alexander, who grew up next door to a church, was intrigued by the rituals performed there, such as a decoration of oranges for the Christingle and reciting the Lord's Prayer, despite not believing in organised religion himself. He remarked, "I was so yearning to be a part of something, I think that's why, obviously, religion is really powerful. All the ritualism and symbolism and I'm just really drawn by all of that stuff." He further observed that "traditionally, the church has like very much shut out gay people" and he has tried to subvert it "a little bit". Viewing songwriting as a cathartic and mysterious healing ritual, he noticed "odd parallels between a church's sense of belonging, and the celebratory freedom that exists in a space filled with dancing, thrashing bodies, and filthy, sexy pop". Following his breakup, Alexander read the novel Dancer from the Dance by Andrew Holleran, which portrayed "the club...like a church; a church for gay people to go and dance." This idea inspired the album. He later chose the album's title upon discovering the meaning of "palo santo", which he considered apt as he had met "a lot of guys who think they have some holy wood"; he remarked, "thinking that your dick is holy? I've known guys like that."

"I wanted to create this kind of fantasy world that music would go alongside – pop music is always about fantasy and escapism to me, so we should just create our own world that all of the music videos we make and our live show, the visuals and the artwork, the merchandise – everything can be consistent from this one unique world, and that world is called Palo Santo."

— Alexander on the concept of Palo Santo.

Palo Santo is intended as a concept album. Based around the concept of "post-human failure", it is set in the world of Palo Santo, a futuristic dystopian society populated by human-hunting androids. Alexander opined that he saw that it was his chance to flip society's normal social rules on their head and begin to question ideas such as "What is an android's sexuality?", "What is an android's gender?", and "How would an android experience love?". Pundits also noted its lyrical themes have mainly dealt with "the murky, complicated side" of desire, as well as the connection between religion and carnality, using religious iconography in dealing with themes of sexuality, queerness and guilt. Critics noted the record as primarily consisting of dance-pop and electropop beats influenced by 1990s pop and R&B.

=== Songs ===
"Palo Santo"
Named after the South American wood, Alfred Soto of Spin surmised the lyrics of "Palo Santo" celebrates a lover who is like "the darkness" in him but may also be a literal translation of what if feels like to have holy wood inside him.

All tracks on Palo Santo were co-written by Alexander. The album opens with "Sanctify", produced by Kid Harpoon. Inspired by Dancer from the Dance, Alexander wrote the song about his past relationships with straight-identifying men, whose conflicted feelings he discusses in evocative lyrics about obscuring masks and sinful confessions, as he reassures them that what they are doing is not wrong. The following track, "Hallelujah", was co-written with Goldsworthy, Kurstin, Michaels, and Tranter. Its lyrics talk of getting onto the dancefloor and letting loose, dancing with strangers "until our bodies are singing 'Hallelujah'". Kurstin and Ralph co-wrote the third track, "All for You", as "one to get deep on the dance floor and release your inner demons", referring to the feeling of relief after leaving a toxic lover. The fourth song, "Karma", written with Daniel Traynor, Sarah Hudson, Clarence Coffee Jr., talks about trying good fortune on for size, navigating the game-play that happens within a budding romance. A short version of "Hypnotised" was used for a promotional campaign by the fashion company H&M, for their collection with Turkish-Canadian fashion designer Erdem.

Following "Hypnotised" is "Rendezvous", written by the whole trio. In the song, Alexander sings of being disappointed to discover that a relationship is merely physical. He described the seventh song, "If You're Over Me", as about being friends with an ex-lover, lamenting that "spoiler alert—it doesn't often work. In fact, in my experience, the relationship often ends up ruined." Written with Steve Mac, Alexander added that the song "is about the emotional torture that ensues —– meeting up and making out, then breaking up all over again, then making out some more". The eighth track, "Preacher", written with Jesse Shatkin, is a song about unlearning guilt and embracing one's self. Alexander wrote the ninth song "Lucky Escape" by himself to confront the more unlikable aspects of our own emotions. Following this is the titular song "Palo Santo". Written with Hudson, the song was inspired by someone Alexander was caught in a love triangle with who uses the "palo santo"-infused incense sticks to cleanse and purify his personal space. The interlude "Here" closes the standard version of the album, which features a stripped-down performance from Alexander. Three bonus tracks appear on the album's deluxe edition: "Howl", written by the trio with Ralph and Alex Hope; "Don't Panic", written with Kid Harpoon; and "Up in Flames", which was co-written with Kurstin. The Japanese release of the album includes "Coyote", written with Ralph; and a remix version of "If You're Over Me" featuring South Korean singer Key from the boy group Shinee as its closing track.

== Release and promotion ==
Palo Santo was released by Polydor and its parent company Universal Music Group on 6 July 2018. In the United States, it was released by Polydor's sister label Interscope Records. On 6 March 2018, Polydor released a PSEN (Note: PSEN stands for the Palo Santo Entertainment Network, a promotional campaign created for a cohesive aesthetic in the world of Palo Santo.) Messenger bot to formally launch the album's promotional campaign, which included cryptic clues and video clips. The campaign also posted various billboards displaying QR codes, and involved having an android internet bot taking over the trio's Twitter account, and publishing an instruction manual on "How to Treat a Human", as well as a graphic novel that could be accessed through the band's Instagram Story. "Sanctify", its lead single, preceded the album's release on 7 March 2018. It attained a position inside the top forty of the UK Singles Chart. The follow-up single, "If You're Over Me", issued on 10 May 2018, became a top ten hit on both the UK Singles Chart and the Irish Singles Chart. Two promotional singles were released: the titular track "Palo Santo" on 22 June 2018; and "All for You", on 27 June 2018. On the eve of the album's street date, a PSEN Televisual music video for "All for You" was released featuring phone numbers for UK and US viewers to call. Those numbers contained a pre-recorded message from Alexander sharing his robotic expertise on "feelings and emotions".

The release of the album was prefaced by the "Palo Santo Parties", hosted by the trio in New York, San Francisco, Los Angeles, Berlin and London, where they performed various selections from Communion and Palo Santo. The Palo Santo Tour, in support of the album, began in North America in October 2018, and will conclude in 2019. In addition, the trio also made various televised appearances to promote the album: they performed "Sanctify" on Sounds Like Friday Night, "If You're Over Me" on Late Night with Seth Meyers, BBC Radio 1's Big Weekend, and The Graham Norton Show They also performed both singles at the 2018 Summertime Ball. On 29 November 2018, the album was re-released digitally, with the addition of "Play", a collaborative single with English DJ Jax Jones.

=== Short film ===
The release of Palo Santo was accompanied by a short film of same name. The short film is a futuristic sci-fi musical, set in the world of Palo Santo, where androids have taken over and crave the feeling of true emotion. The remaining humans, like Alexander, are recruited to perform for The Showman (Pansringarm). It features a neon colourscape, a dance breakdown, and a narration by Dench as the "Mother of Palo Santo".

Directed by Fred Rowson and filmed in Thailand over four days at the beginning of 2018, the 15-minute short stars Alexander, Ben Whishaw, Vithaya Pansringarm, and is narrated by Judi Dench. It marked the second time Alexander, Whishaw, and Dench have worked together, after starring in the West End production of Peter and Alice in 2013.

It also contains the music videos for "Sanctify", "All for You" and "If You're Over Me", with the short film expanding on the story introduced therein. Following the same storyline, on the band's YouTube channel other clips and live performances have been uploaded.

Dancing direction and choreography, for the whole project, were provided by Aaron Sillis with dancers all coming from the "Sillis Movement", Sillis's official dance crew.

== Reception ==
=== Critical response ===
Professional ratings
Aggregate scores
Source	Rating
AnyDecentMusic?	7.9/10
Metacritic	81/100
Review scores
Source	Rating
DIY	5/5 stars
The Guardian	4/5 stars
The Independent	4/5 stars
The Line of Best Fit	9/10
Mojo	4/5 stars
NME	5/5 stars
The Observer	4/5 stars
Pitchfork	6.5/10
Q	4/5 stars
Uncut	3/5 stars

Palo Santo has received critical acclaim from music critics. At Metacritic, which assigns a normalised rating out of 100 to reviews from mainstream critics, the album has an average score of 81 based on 16 reviews, indicating "universal acclaim". NME contributor El Hunt gave the album five stars, the highest possible rating for the magazine, observing that the album "links the intense escapism of pop music with the sanctuary the queer community seek in their own special, sacred spaces," before concluding that "Filthy, sexy, thoroughly debauched pop at its finest; Palo Santo feels like a magical album." Alim Kheraj of DIY awarded the album a similar rating, noting that what Palo Santo has that Communion lacks is an "inventive ballad", and described it as an "overwhelmingly intimate record that makes you wonder just what Years & Years could be capable of next".

Reviewing for The Guardian, Laura Snapes gave the record a four-star rating, writing that "Palo Santo packs a deeper emotional resonance than Communion, which blurred its high emotional stakes beneath a breezy whirl." Describing the album as "astute, and convincingly ambitious", she stated that the "empathetic outlook and refusal to embrace reductive ideas of good and bad is a tonic during an era in which moral didactic-ism has worryingly infiltrated pop culture. It's probably not what anyone expects a male pop star to do in 2018." The Independent music correspondent Roisin O'Connor gave the album the same rating, discerning sexuality as being "at the heart" of the album, and praising Alexander's courage to put a vibrant, dynamic character who asserts themselves and their sexuality on full display.

Giving the record a 6.5 rating, Pitchfork contributor Cameron Cook described it as a "promising second album because it evolves past the sound of the band's debut." Cook opined that "at its low points, the record lacks the bite to drive home the razor's-edge duality of sacred and profane that Alexander seems to thrive on", further observing that "At their best, Years & Years are capable of godlike sublimity. To take up permanent residence in the heavens, all they need to do is exorcise a few colorless spirits." Alfred Soto of Spin, however, was unsatisfied with the album as their follow-up record, pointing out Goldsworthy and Türkmen's lack of input, and writing that Alexander is "a serious dude—intoxication he limns well, but euphoria gives him trouble, as if it were a foreign language."' Despite praising "Up in Flames" as Alexander's "most confident" performance, he lamented that it was not on the standard edition of the album and called its not being chosen as the lead single an "expected perversity".

=== Chart performance ===
Palo Santo debuted on the UK Albums Chart at number three with 20,297 copies. In the rest of Europe, the album opened at the top ten in Ireland and the Flemish region of Belgium, and attained a top forty position in the national charts of Germany, the Netherlands, Norway, Sweden, and the Wallonia region of Belgium. In the United States, Palo Santo debuted on the Billboard 200 chart at number 75 with 9,000 units, including 4,000 pure album sales. It also topped the Billboard Dance/Electronic Albums chart, the band's second album to do so after Communion debuted at the top in 2015.

== Track listing ==
Standard edition
No.	Title	Writer(s)	Producer(s)	Length
1.	"Sanctify"	Olly Alexander; Thomas Hull	Kid Harpoon	3:09
2.	"Hallelujah"	Alexander; Julia Michaels; Justin Tranter; Greg Kurstin	Kurstin; Mark Ralph^{[b]}	3:39
3.	"All for You"	Alexander; Mark Ralph; Kurstin	Kurstin	3:39
4.	"Karma"	Alexander; Sarah Hudson; Clarence Coffee Jr.; Daniel Traynor	GRADES; Coffee Jr.^{[c]}	3:13
5.	"Hypnotised"	Alexander; Ralph	Ralph	4:03
6.	"Rendezvous"	Alexander; Michael Goldsworthy; Emre Türkmen; Ralph	Ralph; Years & Years	3:04
7.	"If You're Over Me"	Alexander; Ralph; Steve McCutcheon	Steve Mac	3:09
8.	"Preacher"	Alexander; Michaels; Tranter; Jesse Shatkin	Shatkin	3:26
9.	"Lucky Escape"	Alexander	Two Inch Punch	3:46
10.	"Palo Santo"	Alexander; Hudson	Two Inch Punch; John Foyle^{[b]}	4:02
11.	"Here"	Alexander	Alexander	1:39
Total length:				36:49

Physical deluxe edition bonus tracks
No.	Title	Writer(s)	Producer(s)	Length
12.	"Howl"	Alexander; Goldsworthy; Türkmen; Ralph; Alexandra Robotham	Ralph; Years & Years	3:53
13.	"Don't Panic"	Alexander; Hull	Harpoon	3:15
14.	"Up in Flames"	Alexander; Kurstin	Kurstin	3:34
Total length:				47:31

Japanese physical edition additional bonus tracks
No.	Title	Writer(s)	Producer(s)	Length
15.	"Coyote"	Alexander; Ralph	Ralph	3:50
16.	"If You're Over Me" (Remix featuring Key from Shinee)	Alexander; Ralph; McCutcheon; Kim Ki-bum	Mac	3:07
Total length:				54:28

Physical re-release additional track
No.	Title	Writer(s)	Producer(s)	Length
12.	"Play" (with Jax Jones)	Alexander; Ralph; Timucin Aluo; Uzoechi Emenike	Jax Jones; Ralph	3:06
Total length:				39:55

Digital deluxe edition bonus tracks
No.	Title	Writer(s)	Producer(s)	Length
12.	"Play" (with Jax Jones)	Alexander; Ralph; Aluo; Emenike	Jax Jones; Ralph	3:06
13.	"Valentino" (with MNEK)	Alexander; Emenike	MNEK	3:02
14.	"Howl"	Alexander; Goldsworthy; Türkmen; Ralph; Robotham	Ralph; Years & Years	3:53
15.	"Don't Panic"	Alexander; Hull	Harpoon	3:15
16.	"Up in Flames"	Alexander; Kurstin	Kurstin	3:34
Total length:				53:39

Notes

- ^{^[b]} signifies an additional producer.
- ^{^[c]} signifies a vocal producer.

== Personnel ==
Years & Years

- Olly Alexander – piano, production, vocals
- Michael Goldsworthy – bass, electric bass, percussion, synthesizer bass, background vocals
- Emre Türkmen – beats, percussion, programming, synthesizer, background vocals

Additional musicians

- Julian Burg – engineering, mix engineering
- Clarence Coffee, Jr. – vocal production, background vocals
- John Davis – mastering
- Samuel Dent – engineering assistance
- John Foyle – additional production, mixing
- Michael Freeman – mixing assistance
- Tom Fuller – engineering
- Serban Ghenea – mixing
- Grades (Daniel Traynor) – engineering, instrumentation, production, programming
- John Hanes – mix engineering
- Michael Hauptman – photography
- Jonathan Hucks – engineering
- Key – vocals
- Kid Harpoon (Thomas Hull) – production
- Greg Kurstin – drums, engineering, mix engineering, percussion, production, synthesizer
- Chris Laws – drums, engineering
- Ted Lovett – creative direction
- Steve Mac – keyboards, production
- John Parricelli – guitar
- Alex Pasco – engineering, mix engineering
- Dann Pursey – engineering
- Mark Ralph – additional production, mixing, production
- Jesse Shatkin – bass, drum programming, drums, engineer, guitar, percussion, piano, production, programming, synthesizer
- Mark "Spike" Stent – mixing
- Two Inch Punch – mixing, production

== Charts ==
=== Weekly charts ===
Chart (2018)	Peak position
Australian Albums (ARIA)	26
Austrian Albums (Ö3 Austria)	50
Belgian Albums (Ultratop Flanders)	6
Belgian Albums (Ultratop Wallonia)	25
Canadian Albums (Billboard)	52
Danish Albums (Hitlisten)	22
Dutch Albums (Album Top 100)	14
Finnish Albums (Suomen virallinen lista)	18
German Albums (Offizielle Top 100)	27
Hungarian Albums (MAHASZ)	35
Irish Albums (IRMA)	7
Japanese Albums (Oricon)	139
Norwegian Albums (VG-lista)	13
Polish Albums (ZPAV)	22
Scottish Albums (Official Charts)	3
South Korean Albums (Gaon)	61
Spanish Albums (Promusicae)	68
Swedish Albums (Sverigetopplistan)	38
Swiss Albums (Schweizer Hitparade)	15
UK Albums (Official Charts)	3
US Billboard 200	75
US Top Dance Albums (Billboard)	1

=== Year-end charts ===
Chart (2018)	Position
Belgian Albums (Ultratop Flanders)	110

== Certifications ==
Region	Certification	Certified units/sales
Poland (ZPAV)	Gold	10,000^{‡}
United Kingdom (BPI)	Gold	100,000^{‡}
^{‡} Sales+streaming figures based on certification alone.

== Release history ==
List of regions and release dates, showing formats, labels, catalog number and references
Region	Date	Formats	Label	Catalog number	Ref.
Various	6 July 2018	Cassette; CD; digital download; 2×LP; streaming	Polydor	6751650	
Various	6 July 2018	2×LP; Urban Outfitters-exclusive 2×LP	Polydor; Interscope	6754733	
Japan	13 July 2018	Japanese edition CD	Universal Music Japan	UICP-1182	
Brazil	27 July 2018	CD	Universal Music	602567516484	
Various	29 November 2018	Digital download; streaming	Polydor	B07KRTGPFR	

== Tour ==
To promote the album, Years & Years embarked upon the Palo Santo Tour which began in New York City on 24 June 2018 and concludes in Lembang on 16 March 2019. The tour included shows in nineteen countries, including the band's first UK arena shows.

== See also ==
- List of Billboard number-one electronic albums of 2018
- LGBT music
- Religion and sexuality
