= Still Falling for You =

2016 single by Ellie Goulding

Single by Ellie Goulding

from the album Bridget Jones's Baby: Original Motion Picture Soundtrack
- Released: 19 August 2016
- Studio: MXM (Los Angeles); Wolf Cousins (Stockholm); Willow-Valley (Gothenburg) (Note: Strings)
- Genre: Pop
- Length: 4:00
- Label: Polydor
- Songwriters: Ellie Goulding; Tove Lo; Rickard Göransson; Shellback; Ilya
- Producers: Ilya; Shellback

Ellie Goulding singles chronology
"Something in the Way You Move" (2016)	"Still Falling for You" (2016)	"First Time" (2017)

Music video
- "Still Falling for You" on YouTube

"Still Falling for You" is a song recorded by English singer-songwriter Ellie Goulding for the soundtrack to the film Bridget Jones's Baby (2016). The song was written by Goulding, Tove Lo, Rickard Göransson, Shellback and Ilya Salmanzadeh and produced by the latter two. It was released as a single on 19 August 2016.

== Composition ==
The song is written in the key of D♭ major with a common time tempo of 96 beats per minute. Goulding's vocals span from A♭_{3} to F_{5} in the song.

== Chart performance ==
In 2021, the song became a popular TikTok trend. Following the rise in popularity, "Still Falling for You" re-entered various iTunes and Spotify charts worldwide. During the month of October, the song became Goulding's second most listened to song on Spotify.

== Music video ==
The music video for "Still Falling for You" was directed by Emil Nava and premiered on 25 August 2016. The video featured Ellie Goulding singing the song behind a projector. The projector showed scenes from the Bridget Jones' Baby and abstract, colourful and other patterns with an inclusion of birds as the projected background. In between the video, there were also cuts made to show scenes from the film.

== Live performances ==
On 24 September 2022, Goulding performed "Still Falling for You" at the 2022 Laver Cup held in the O_{2} Arena in London to commemorate Roger Federer's retirement.

== Track listings ==
Digital download
No.	Title	Length
1.	"Still Falling for You"	4:00

Digital download – Jonas Blue Remix
No.	Title	Length
1.	"Still Falling for You" (Jonas Blue Remix)	3:08

Digital download – Laibert Remix
No.	Title	Length
1.	"Still Falling for You" (Laibert Remix)	3:23

Digital download – Live
No.	Title	Length
1.	"Still Falling for You" (Live)	4:01

== Credits and personnel ==
Credits adapted from the liner notes of Bridget Jones's Baby: Original Motion Picture Soundtrack.

- Ellie Goulding – vocals, background vocals
- Ilya – production, vocal production, programming, keys
- Shellback – production, programming, keys, drums
- Sam Holland – engineering
- Jeremy Lertola – engineering assistance
- Cory Bice – engineering assistance
- Peter Carlsson – vocal production
- Serban Ghenea – mixing
- John Hanes – engineering for mix
- Rickard Göransson – guitar
- Johan Carlsson – piano
- Mattias Bylund – string arrangements, strings, string recording, string editing
- Mattias Johansson – violin
- David Bukovinszky – cello
- Tove Lo – background vocals
- Tom Coyne – mastering

== Charts ==
=== Weekly charts ===
2016–2017 weekly chart performance for "Still Falling for You"
Chart (2016–2017)	Peak position
Australia (ARIA)	21
Austria (Ö3 Austria Top 40)	17
Belgium (Ultratop 50 Flanders)	16
Belgium (Ultratop 50 Wallonia)	27
Canada Hot 100 (Billboard)	62
Canada Hot AC (Billboard)	49
CIS Airplay (TopHit)	119
Czech Republic Airplay (ČNS IFPI)	6
Czech Republic Singles Digital (ČNS IFPI)	10
Euro Digital Song Sales (Billboard)	3
France (SNEP)	23
Germany (GfK)	33
Hungary (Rádiós Top 40)	4
Hungary (Single Top 40)	3
Ireland (IRMA)	20
Italy (FIMI)	57
Luxembourg Digital Song Sales (Billboard)	7
Netherlands (Dutch Top 40)	19
Netherlands (Single Top 100)	33
New Zealand (Recorded Music NZ)	20
Norway (VG-lista)	35
Poland Airplay (ZPAV)	5
Portugal (AFP)	68
Scottish Singles Sales (Official Charts)	4
Slovakia Airplay (ČNS IFPI)	6
Slovakia Singles Digital (ČNS IFPI)	16
Slovenia (SloTop50)	10
Spain (Promusicae)	82
Sweden (Sverigetopplistan)	50
Switzerland (Schweizer Hitparade)	10
UK Singles (Official Charts)	11
US Bubbling Under Hot 100 (Billboard)	3
US Adult Pop Airplay (Billboard)	25
US Pop Airplay (Billboard)	39

2022 weekly chart performance for "Still Falling For You"
Chart (2022)	Peak position
Switzerland (Schweizer Hitparade)	24

=== Year-end charts ===
Year-end chart performance for "Still Falling for You"
Chart (2016)	Position
Hungary (Single Top 40)	37
Netherlands (Dutch Top 40)	91
UK Singles (OCC)	98

== Certifications ==
Certifications for "Still Falling for You"
Region	Certification	Certified units/sales
Australia (ARIA)	Gold	35,000^{‡}
Brazil (Pro-Música Brasil)	Platinum	60,000^{‡}
Denmark (IFPI Danmark)	Gold	45,000^{‡}
France (SNEP)	Gold	100,000^{‡}
Germany (BVMI)	Gold	200,000^{‡}
Italy (FIMI)	Gold	25,000^{‡}
New Zealand (RMNZ)	Platinum	30,000^{‡}
Poland (ZPAV)	Platinum	50,000^{‡}
Spain (Promusicae)	Gold	30,000^{‡}
Sweden (GLF)	Gold	20,000^{‡}
United Kingdom (BPI)	Platinum	811,000
United States (RIAA)	Gold	500,000^{‡}
^{‡} Sales+streaming figures based on certification alone.

== Release history ==
Release dates and formats for "Still Falling for You"
Region	Date	Format	Version	Label	Ref.
Various	19 August 2016	Digital download	Original	Polydor	
United States	29 August 2016	Hot adult contemporary radio	Original	Interscope	
United States	30 August 2016	Contemporary hit radio	Original	Interscope	
Various	2 September 2016	Digital download	Jonas Blue Remix	Polydor	
Italy	16 September 2016	Radio airplay	Original	Universal	
Various	7 October 2016	Digital download	Laibert Remix	Polydor	
Various	11 November 2016	Digital download	Live	Polydor	
