= Olly Alexander =

English singer and actor (born 1990)

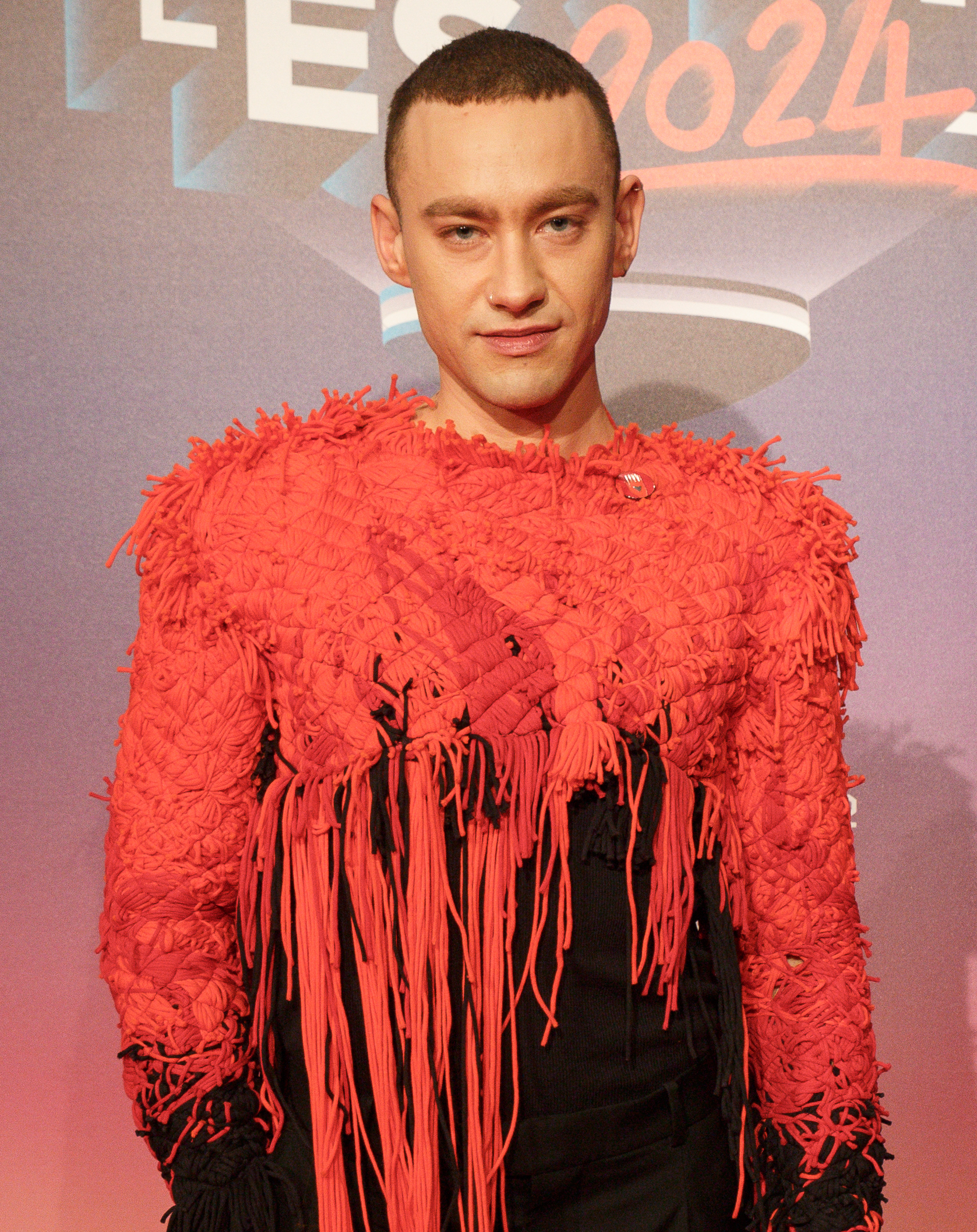
- Alexander in 2024
- Born: Oliver Alexander Thornton; 15 July 1990 (age 36); Harrogate, North Yorkshire, England
- Education: Hereford College of Arts
- Occupations: Singer; songwriter; actor
- Years active: 2008–present
- Musical career
- Genres: Synth-pop; indie pop; electronica; dance-pop
- Labels: Polydor; Kitsuné
- Formerly of: Years & Years
- Website: www.ollyalexander.co.uk

Oliver Alexander Thornton (born 15 July 1990) is an English singer, songwriter, actor, and LGBTQ activist who rose to prominence as the lead singer of the English pop band Years & Years, achieving two No. 1 albums on the UK Albums Chart, a No. 1 single and five Top 10 entries on the UK Singles Chart. He continued to release music under the band's name between 2021 and 2023 until their dissolution in 2024. During their career Years & Years were nominated for six Brit Awards.

As an actor, Alexander rose to critical acclaim for his performance as Ritchie Tozer in the Channel 4 drama series It's a Sin (2021), earning Best Actor nominations at the British Academy Television Awards, Critics' Choice Television Awards and Independent Spirit Awards. Alexander represented the United Kingdom in the Eurovision Song Contest 2024 in Malmö, Sweden, with his song "Dizzy", which marked his first release under his own name; in the grand final, he finished in 18th place with 46 points. His debut solo album Polari was released on 7 February 2025.

== Early life ==
Alexander was born on 15 July 1990, in Harrogate, North Yorkshire. His mother, Vicki Thornton, was one of the founders of the Coleford Music Festival. Alexander attended St John's Primary School in Coleford and Monmouth Comprehensive School. While at Monmouth Comprehensive School, he acted in two school plays: Guys and Dolls, as Benny, and The Caucasian Chalk Circle, as the Corporal. After completing his GCSEs Alexander studied Performing Arts at the Hereford College of Arts. The New York Times reported that he wrote his first song on his father's Casio keyboard aged 10. His parents separated when he was 13, and he and his brother Ben, were thereafter brought up solely by his mother.

He obtained the services of an agent when he was 16, while auditioning for a part in British TV series Skins. Alexander said he dropped out of the Hereford College of Arts to pursue his acting career as parts were offered, stating: "I started acting when I was young; it just sort of happened. I dropped out of school to work around the world, which was amazing." "I really wanted to become a singer or a musician ... All of a sudden I was an actor. It was never something I'd set my heart on being. I'm still trying to work it out ... I really hated school because I was totally bullied. But you're never bullied in drama class because the weird kids do well in drama class. That's a safe place". Alexander also experienced bulimia as an adolescent.

== Career ==
=== Acting career ===
Alexander starred in CBBC's Summerhill in 2008. The show was about the radical Summerhill School in Leiston in Suffolk, and was subsequently nominated for three children's BAFTA awards. His first film Bright Star was nominated for an Academy Award in the United States for Best Achievement in Costume Design. He also acted in the 2009 films Tormented starring Alex Pettyfer and Enter the Void. In 2010, Alexander played Evan in the Bush Theatre production of The Aliens. Alexander contributed to the script and music for the independent film The Dish & the Spoon, released in early 2011. In 2012, he appeared in the theatre production of Mercury Fur, taking the part of Naz at The Old Red Lion, Islington.

From March to June 2013 Alexander starred as Peter Pan in the West End play Peter and Alice acting alongside Ben Whishaw and Judi Dench. Alexander also had a supporting role in the final series of Skins, playing Cassie Ainsworth's stalker in the two-part episode "Skins Pure", which aired in July 2013. Also in 2013, Google Analytics released an internal corporate video which featured Alexander as a demanding shopper under the sub-heading "That is what happens when you save on usability".

Alexander also appeared in The Riot Club, the film adaptation of Laura Wade's stage play Posh alongside British actors Sam Claflin, Max Irons and Douglas Booth. He briefly portrayed the vampire Fenton in the British-American horror series Penny Dreadful in 2014. In the independent film Funny Bunny, which first premiered at SXSW 2015, Alexander played Titty, a troubled teenager. The film was directed and written by Alison Bagnall, who directed The Dish & the Spoon, while Alexander was a co-writer together with the other two leads. The film was shown at art houses during the summer and was theatrically released on 13 November 2015.

In January 2021 Alexander appeared in a leading role in the Channel 4 and HBO Max drama It's a Sin, which depicted gay life in the 1980s and early 1990s, and the onset of HIV/AIDS. The show and Alexander's performance earned critical acclaim. In 2024, Alexander made a cameo appearance as himself in the BBC soap opera, EastEnders, in an episode that aired on 2 May.

From September 2025 to January 2026, Alexander starred as Algernon Moncrieff in the National Theatre production of Oscar Wilde's The Importance of Being Earnest, directed by Max Webster at the Noël Coward Theatre in London's West End. The production also starred Nathan Stewart-Jarrett, Shobna Gulati, Hugh Dennis and Stephen Fry.

=== Music career ===
==== 2010–2022 ====
Years & Years was formed in 2010, after Mikey Goldsworthy moved to London from Australia and met Noel Leeman and then later, Emre Türkmen online. Alexander later joined the band as its lead vocalist, after Goldsworthy heard him singing in the shower and liked his voice. The band was originally a five-piece group, with Noel Leeman and Olivier Subria.

Their debut single "I Wish I Knew" was released in July 2012 on the Good Bait label, with the band performing as a five-piece group. Leeman and Subria left the band the following year, leaving them as a trio. In 2013, the group signed a deal to the French label Kitsuné as a three-piece and released their second single, called "Traps", in September 2013, which achieved support from Radio 1 and Radio 6, as well as many online publications such as The Guardian and The Fader. "Traps" also featured on Kitsuné Maison's 15th compilation.

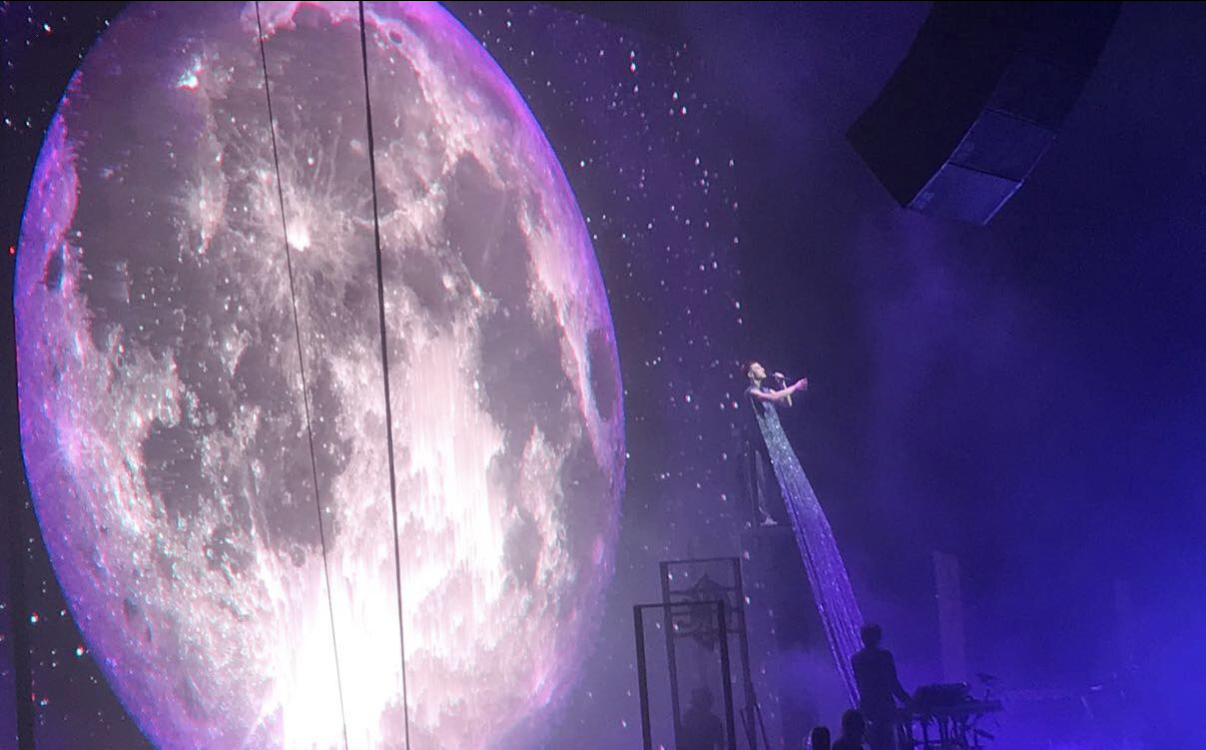
Alexander performing "Palo Santo" at The O2 Arena during the Palo Santo Tour in 2018

The band released their second single "Real" on Kitsuné and iTunes in February 2014. The music video featured an appearance from Alexander's Peter and Alice co-star, Ben Whishaw, and former Misfits actor Nathan Stewart-Jarrett. In 2014, the group changed their record label from the French smaller label Kitsuné to Polydor as they gained prominence. In January 2015, the band won BBC's Sound of 2015 poll.

In the same month the band's sixth single, "King", was previewed on BBC Radio 1 and selected as Zane Lowe's Hottest Record in the World. "King" was released on 1 March 2015, and reached No. 1 on the UK Singles Chart, earning the band national recognition. Internationally, the single peaked within the Top 10 of the charts in Australia, Austria, Bulgaria, Denmark, Germany, Luxembourg, the Netherlands, Ireland and Switzerland. On 25 February 2015, Years & Years were nominated for the Critics' Choice Award at the 2015's BRIT Awards. Their debut studio album, Communion, was released on 10 July 2015, and entered the UK Albums Chart at No. 1.

Years & Years' second studio album, titled Palo Santo, was released on 6 July 2018. Five singles were released from the album: "Sanctify", "If You're Over Me", "All for You", "Play" and "Valentino with "Sanctify", "If You're Over Me" and "Play" making the Top 40 on the UK Singles Chart, and "If You're Over Me" and "Play" became Top 10 hits. To promote the album, Years & Years embarked upon the Palo Santo Tour which began in New York City on 24 June 2018, and concludes in Lembang on 16 March 2019. The tour included shows in nineteen countries, including the band's first UK arena shows.

In September 2018 Years & Years released the official music video for "All For You", featuring an angelic version of Alexander dancing within an abandoned warehouse before transforming into a demonic version of himself and engaging in a dance-off with an android. Alexander collaborated with the Pet Shop Boys on their 2019 single "Dreamland" and later released a cover of "It's a Sin" to coincide with his starring role in the drama series of the same title.

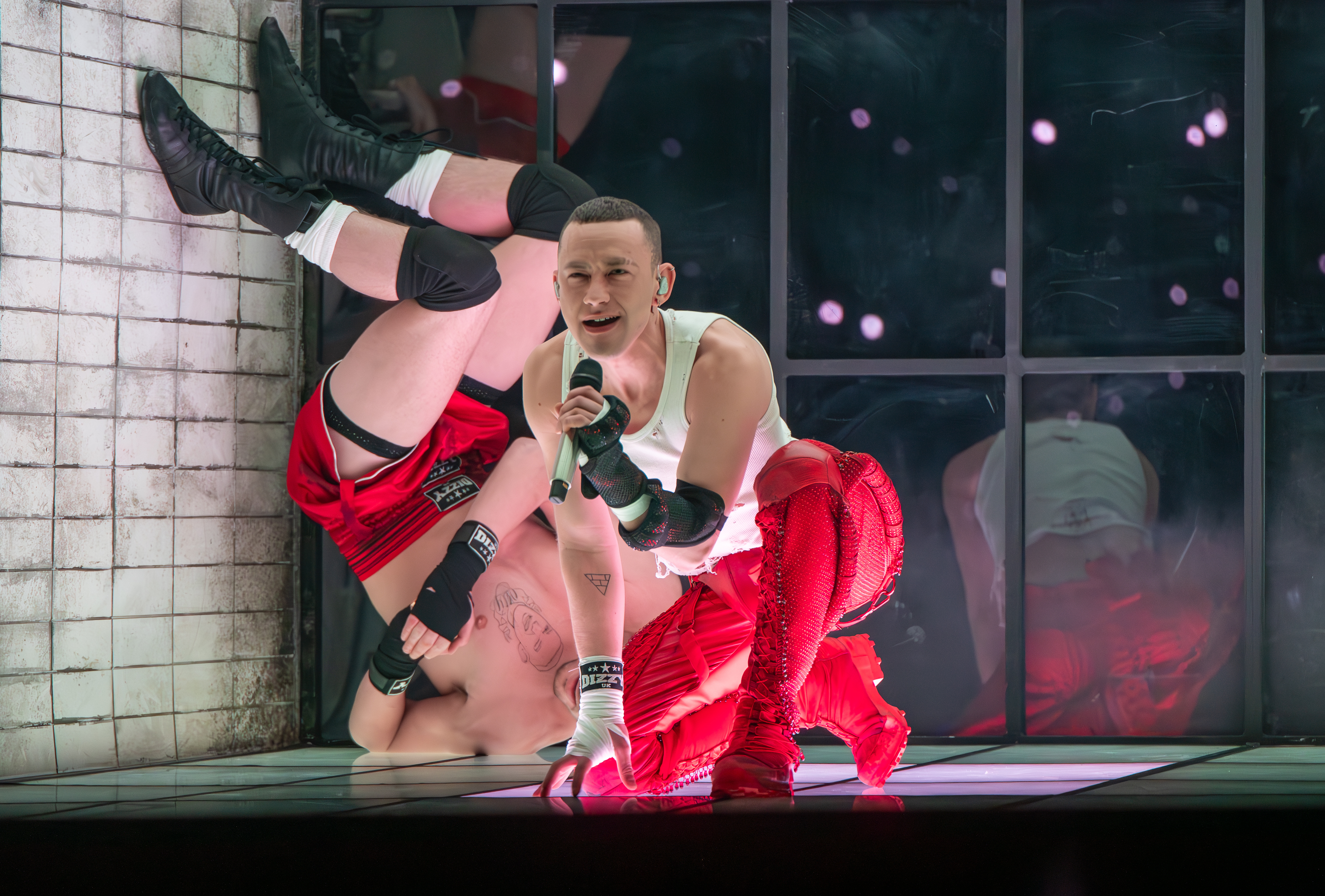
Alexander performing during Eurovision Song Contest 2024 in Malmö

On 18 March 2021 Years & Years became Alexander's solo project. Regarding the decision, Alexander later explained: "Bands are like marriages. Any separation is difficult, and I think it went as well as it could, with us." Alexander released his third studio album Night Call in 2022, the last under the Years & Years name. The album was commercially and critically successful, receiving critical acclaim from music critics and debuting in the Top 3 on the UK Albums Chart.

==== 2023–present ====
On 16 December 2023, during the final of the twenty-first series of Strictly Come Dancing, it was announced that Alexander would be representing the United Kingdom in the Eurovision Song Contest 2024. Following the announcement he told the BBC that he had "wanted to do it for a while" and it "felt like this was the right time to start releasing music under my name". His Eurovision competing entry, "Dizzy", was released on 1 March 2024, and marked Alexander's first release under his own name. Alexander performed "Dizzy" at the first Eurovision semi-final on 7 May 2024, making the UK the first pre-qualifying country to perform in a semi-final. Alexander came 18th in the contest final on 11 May 2024, scoring 46 jury points (13th) but zero from the public vote (25th).

His first album under his own name called Polari was released on 7 February 2025. The first Single "Cupid's bow" was released on 11 October 2024, followed by a music video on 24 October. The second single Polari was released with a music video on 21 November. The third single "Archangel" was released on 13 December 2024. The fourth single "When We Kiss", was released on 10 January 2025 with a music video. On 21 March 2025, Alexander announced on his social media that he parted ways with his long-time record company Polydor Records. In November 2025, it was announced that Alexander had teamed up with Mighty Hoopla to perform a one-off concert, Trans Mission, on 11 March 2026, in aid of trans-solidarity charities Good Law Project and Not a Phase. Other performers in the line-up will include Sugababes, Wolf Alice, Beth Ditto and Sophie Ellis-Bextor.

== Advocacy, politics and personal life ==
Through various interviews and charity campaigns Alexander has promoted safer sex and HIV screening, and supported initiatives against LGBTQ bullying. He has also spoken openly about his own struggles with depression, self-harm, eating disorders and anxiety from age 13 onwards. He is gay, and in 2017, he presented a BBC Three documentary investigating the link between being gay and the development of mental health disorders. In it, he opened up about his bulimia. In 2018, Alexander was part of Sport Relief's attempt to raise awareness of mental health alongside other celebrities Nadiya Hussain and Stephen Fry.

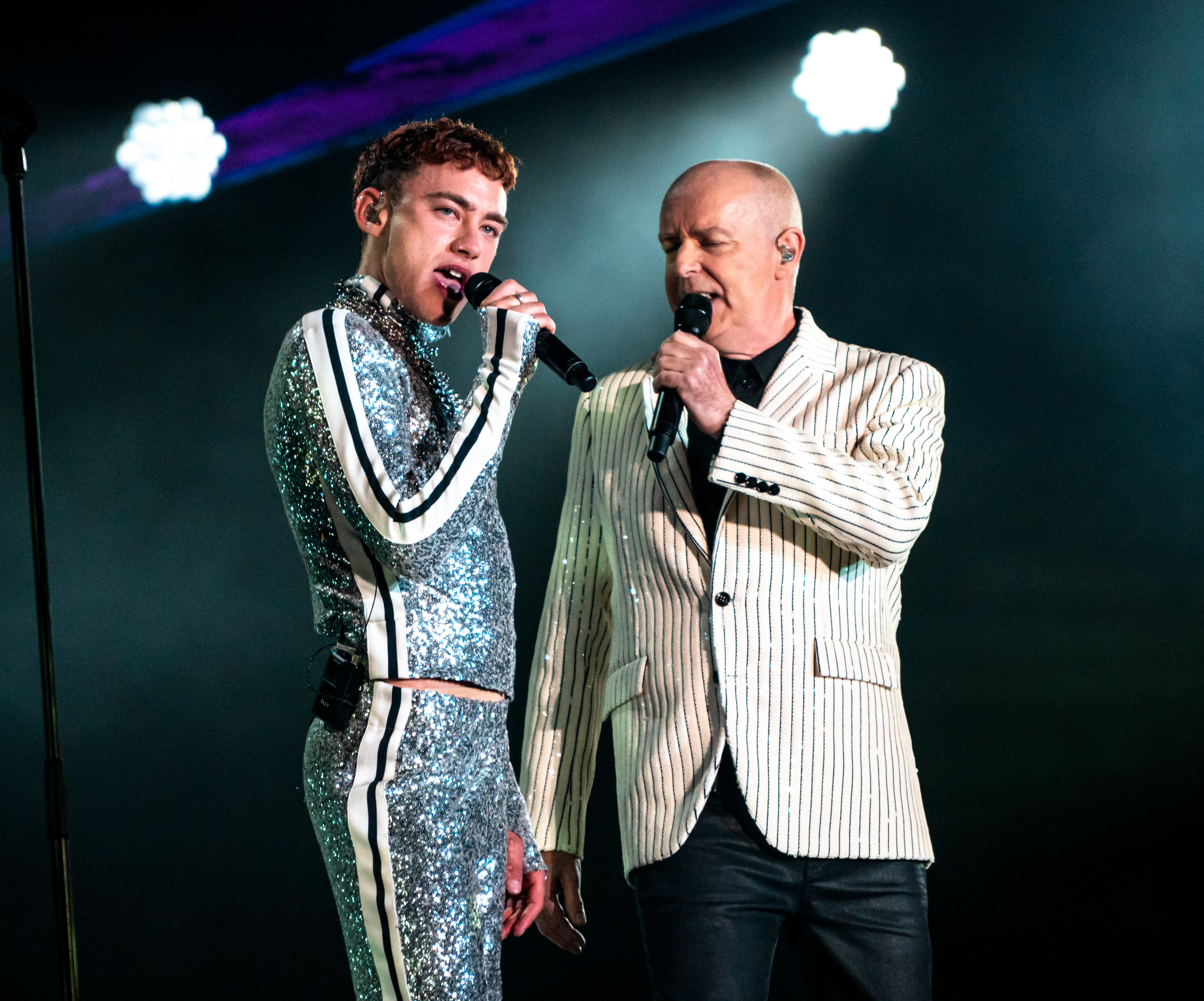
Alexander performing with Neil Tennant of the Pet Shop Boys in 2019

Alexander describes himself as a "real left-winger" and said in 2016 that he "had a crush on" Labour Party leader Jeremy Corbyn. Beginning in May 2015, Alexander was in a relationship with musician Neil Amin-Smith, who was in Clean Bandit. Due to scheduling conflicts while on tour and recording, they parted at the end of 2015. At the 2016 Glastonbury Festival, Alexander took to the stage with his band Years & Years in rainbow ensemble in celebration of PRIDE Week and made headlines with his spur-of-the-moment speech in light of the Orlando nightclub shooting.

As a gay songwriter Alexander has stated in interviews he would like to see greater use of the qualified male pronoun in music. He explained that when he used to write in a diary, he would refer to "you and I" because he wanted to hide who he was writing about. Several Years & Years songs feature male pronouns. "It is kind of sad to me that we don't have gay popstars singing about men using a male pronoun," he told Digital Spy, "but that could change hopefully." Though his work with Years & Years openly references his sexuality, Alexander "can't speak for all gay people, because there are so many different issues, and experiences, and different shapes and sizes. But I can speak for myself, and that is what I'm doing if I'm going to be writing songs and giving interviews, I want to be able to speak about something I care about."

In September 2018 Alexander won GQ's Award "Live Act Of The Year". The award was presented to him by Héloïse Letissier, and in his acceptance speech, Alexander advocated for the LGBTQ community and Mental Health Awareness Month, particularly in regard to men. In the same month, Alexander took part in a video campaign "The Flag We Shouldn't Be Proud Of" for World Suicide Prevention Day, holding up a rainbow flag with two colours ripped from it, and was quoted: "This is the flag we shouldn't be proud of. A flag that represents the two in six LGBTQ people we risk losing to suicide."

In October 2018 British GQ posted an interview between Alexander and Alastair Campbell in which he spoke about his struggles with self-harm and eating disorders, his experiences in 2018 with homophobia, and his political views on Brexit and Donald Trump. In the interview he said he voted Remain in the 2016 referendum, supported Corbyn as Prime Minister and called Trump "repugnant" and "repulsive". During Years & Years' performance on the Pyramid Stage at the 2019 Glastonbury Festival, Alexander gave a speech promoting LGBTQ rights and calling for the elimination of racism, ableism and sexism. The speech earned praise from fans and media.

In protest at the ongoing Israel–Hamas war Alexander signed a letter by LGBTQ association Voices4London, which accused Israel of committing apartheid and genocide against Palestinians. Spokespeople within the Israeli government and the Campaign Against Antisemitism condemned his views and asked the BBC not to allow him to perform at the Eurovision Song Contest 2024, while the BBC rejected the demands, stating that it was not in a position to do so with someone who is not a journalist. In March 2024, Alexander rejected calls to boycott Eurovision because of Israel's participation.

== Achievements ==
In June 2020 in honour of the 50th anniversary of the first LGBTQ pride parade, Queerty named him among the 50 heroes "leading the nation toward equality, acceptance, and dignity for all people". In November 2020, Alexander won the LGBT Celebrity of the Year award at the British LGBT Awards.

For his leading role in It's a Sin Alexander was nominated for a Critics' Choice Television Award for Best Actor in a Limited Series or Movie Made for Television and the British Academy Television Award for Best Actor.

In 2024 he received a gold Blue Peter badge in recognition of his music. That year, he also broke the Guinness World Record for most objects caught while spinning on a chair in one minute with a total of 27, which was inspired by his Eurovision entry "Dizzy".

== Discography ==
=== Studio albums ===
List of studio albums, with selected details
Title	Details	Peak chart positions	
Title	Details	UK	SCO
Polari	Released: 7 February 2025; Label: Polydor; Formats: CD, LP, cassette, digital download, streaming	17	6

=== Compilation albums ===
Title	Details
Odyssey	Released: 3 May 2024; Label: Polydor; Formats: Digital download, streaming

=== Singles ===
List of singles
Title	Year	Peak chart positions								Album
Title	Year	UK	UK Dig.	AUS	IRE	LTU	NZ Hot	SWE Heat.	US Dance	Album
"Dizzy" (Note: "Dizzy is also included on Olly's first compilation album Odyssey.)	2024	42	2	—	—	12	—	1	—	Polari
"Cupid's Bow"	2024	—	78	—	—	— (Note: "Cupid's Bow" did not enter the AGATA Singlų Top 100, but peaked at number 56 on the TopHit Lithuanian Airplay.)	—	—	—	Polari
"Archangel"	2024	—	—	—	—	—	—	—	—	Polari
"When We Kiss"	2025	—	48	—	—	—	—	—	—	Polari
"Whisper in the Waves"	2025	—	—	—	—	—	—	—	—	Polari
"Desire" (with Ian Asher)	2025	— (Note: "Desire" did not enter the UK Singles Chart Top 100, but debuted and peaked at number 32 on the Official UK Dance Singles Chart.)	—	53	93	—	12	—	8	Non-album single
"—" denotes a single that did not chart or was not released in that territory.

==== Promotional singles ====
Title	Year	Album
"Kite" (with Benjamin Ingrosso)	2024	Non-album singles
"Desire" (with Jaxomy)	2024	Non-album singles
"Polari"	2024	Polari

== Filmography ==
=== Film ===
Year	Film	Role
2009	Bright Star	Tom Keats
2009	Tormented	Jason Banks
2009	Enter the Void	Victor
2009	Dust	Elias
2010	The Fades	Himself
2010	Gulliver's Travels	Prince August
2010	The Dish & the Spoon	Boy
2012	Cheerful Weather for the Wedding	Tom
2012	Great Expectations	Herbert Pocket
2013	Le Week-End	Michael
2014	God Help the Girl	James
2014	The Riot Club	Toby Maitland
2015	Funny Bunny	Titty

=== Television ===
Year	Title	Role	Notes
2008	Summerhill	Ned	Main role (4 episodes)
2009	Lewis	Hayden Wishart	"Allegory of Love"
2013	Skins	Jakob	Series 7: "Skins Pure" (2 episodes)
2014	Penny Dreadful	Fenton	2 episodes: "Resurrection" and "Demimonde"
2017	Growing Up Gay	Presenter	Documentary
2019, 2021	Celebrity Gogglebox	Himself	6 episodes
2021	It's a Sin	Ritchie Tozer	Main role (5 episodes)
2021	Ant & Dec's Saturday Night Takeaway	Himself	Series 17 guest announcer
2022	RuPaul's Drag Race UK	Himself	Series 4 guest judge
2024	EastEnders	Himself	Guest appearance (1 episode)
2024	Eurovision Song Contest 2024	Himself	Contestant

=== Theatre ===
Year	Title	Role	Theatre
September–October 2010	The Aliens	Evan	Bush Theatre
March–April 2012	Mercury Fur	Naz	Old Red Lion Theatre
March–June 2013	Peter and Alice	Peter Pan	Noël Coward Theatre
September 2025–January 2026	The Importance of Being Earnest	Algernon Moncrieff	Noël Coward Theatre

=== Corporate video ===
Year	Film	Role
2013	Google Analytics in Real Life Site Search	Demanding Shopper

== Tours ==
- Up Close and Polari (2025)

== Awards and nominations ==
Year	Award	Category	Work	Result	Ref.
2022	TV Choice Awards	Best Actor	It's a Sin	Nominated	
2022	National Television Awards	Drama Performance	It's a Sin	Nominated	
2022	Critics' Choice Awards	Best Actor in a Limited Series	It's a Sin	Nominated	
2022	Independent Spirit Awards	Best Male Performance in a New Scripted Series	It's a Sin	Nominated	
2022	BPG Awards	Best Actor	It's a Sin	Nominated	
2022	BPG Awards	Breakthrough Award	It's a Sin	Nominated	
2022	RTS Programme Awards	Best Actor (Male)	It's a Sin	Nominated	
2022	British Academy Television Awards	Best Actor	It's a Sin	Nominated	
2024	Berlin Music Video Awards	Best Cinematography	Dizzy	Nominated	
2024	Eurovision Awards	Choreo Monarch	Himself	Nominated	

Preceded by Mae Muller with "I Wrote a Song"	United Kingdom in the Eurovision Song Contest; 2024	Succeeded by Remember Monday with "What the Hell Just Happened?"
