= Years & Years =

English electropop band

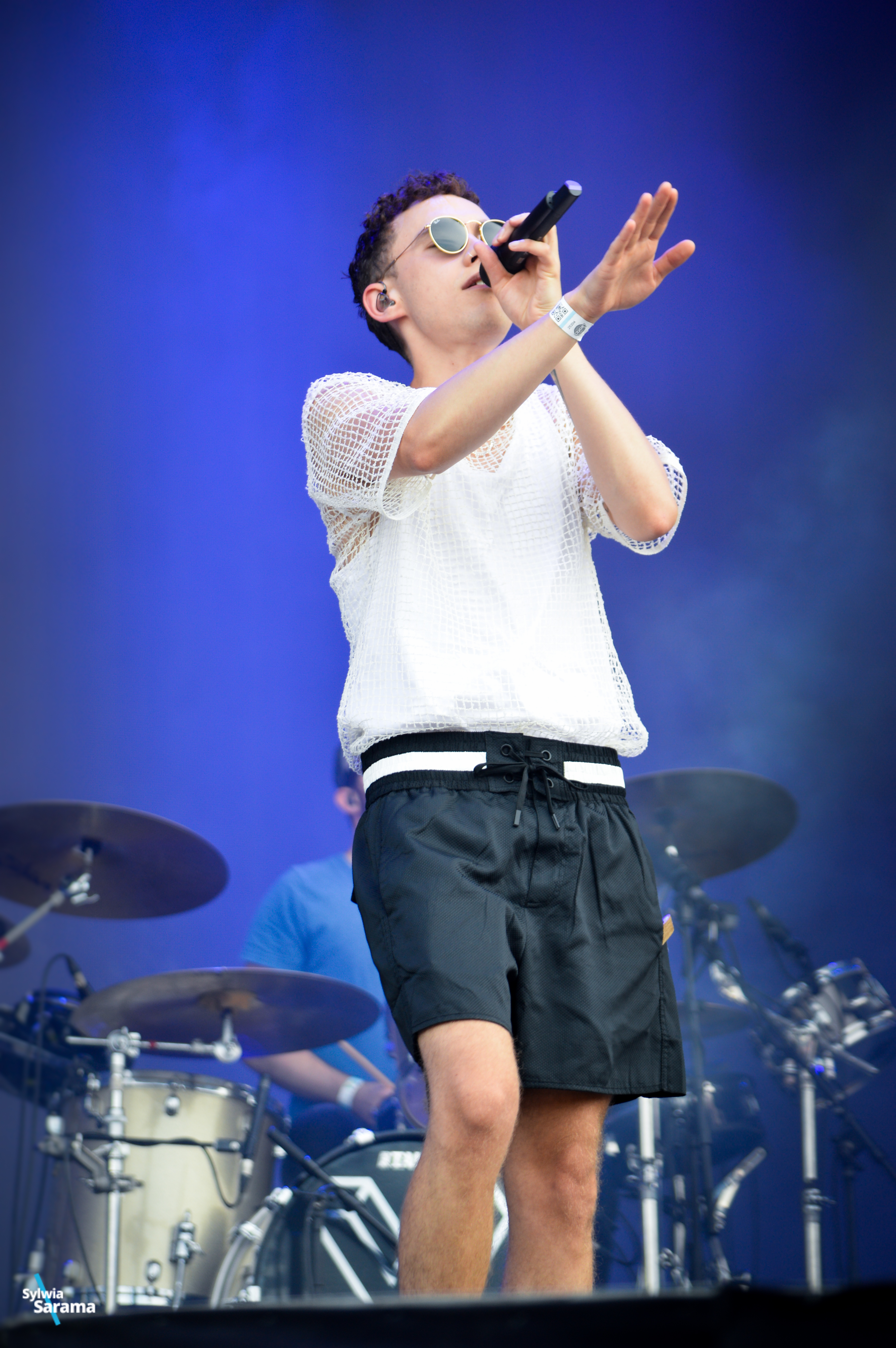
- Olly Alexander performing at the Sziget Festival in Hungary, 2016

Background information
- Origin: London, England
- Genres: Electropop; synth-pop; indie pop; dance-pop
- Years active: 2010–2024
- Labels: Polydor; Interscope
- Past members: Olly Alexander: Mikey Goldsworthy; Emre Türkmen; Noel Leeman; Olivier Subria
- Website: ollyalexander.co.uk

Years & Years were an English electropop band formed in London in 2010. The band rose to fame after their single "King" (2015) topped the UK Singles Chart and entered the top ten hit in thirteen other regions. It was preceded by the release of their debut studio album Communion (2015), which debuted at number one on the UK Albums Chart, and became the fastest-selling debut album of the year from a UK signed band. It also features the commercially successful single "Shine", which reached number two in the UK.

In July 2018, Years & Years released their second album Palo Santo which became their second album to reach the top ten in the UK and features the singles "Sanctify" and "If You're Over Me", which reached the top ten there. In March 2021, the band announced that Years & Years would move forward as frontman Olly Alexander's solo project. In January 2022, the third Years & Years album Night Call was released, debuting at number one in the UK. In 2023, Alexander stopped using the band's name and switched to performing under his own name. The following year, he confirmed that the project had disbanded.

During their career, Years & Years were nominated for six Brit Awards and was a recipient of various awards including an Attitude Award, Sound of 2015 Award, British LGBT Award, Brits Billion Award, Music Moves Europe Award, GQ Award, GAFFA Award, MTV Video Music Awards Japan Award and UK Music Video Awards.

== History ==
=== 2010–2014: Formation and early years ===
The band was formed in 2010, after Mikey Goldsworthy moved to London from Australia and met Noel Leeman and then, later, Emre Türkmen online. Olly Alexander later joined the band as its lead vocalist, after Goldsworthy heard him singing in the shower. The band was originally a five-piece group, with Noel Leeman and Olivier Subria. Years & Years' first single, "I Wish I Knew" was released in July 2012 on the Good Bait label, with the band performing as a five-piece. Leeman and Subria left the band the following year, leaving them as a trio.

In 2013, the group signed a deal to the French label Kitsuné as a three-piece and released their second single, called "Traps" in September 2013. Their third single, called "Real" was released by Kitsuné in February 2014 and its music video featured an appearance by Alexander's Peter and Alice co-star, Ben Whishaw, and the former Misfits actor Nathan Stewart-Jarrett. In 2014, the group signed a deal to Polydor Records and then released their fourth single, called "Take Shelter". The song reached number one on the iTunes UK Singles Electronic Chart. In December 2014, the group released their fifth single, "Desire", which peaked at number 22 on the UK Singles Chart.

=== 2015–2016: Communion ===
In January 2015, the band won BBC's Sound of 2015 poll. In the same month, the band's sixth single, "King", was previewed on BBC Radio 1 and selected as Zane Lowe's Hottest Record in the World. "King" was released on 1 March 2015 and reached number one on the UK Singles Chart. Internationally, the single peaked within the top ten of the charts in Australia, Austria, Bulgaria, Denmark, Germany, Luxembourg, the Netherlands, the Republic of Ireland and Switzerland. On 25 February 2015, Years & Years were nominated for the Critics Choice Award at the 2015's BRIT Awards. On 18 March 2015, Years & Years announced their debut studio album, Communion on their Instagram profile. It was released on 10 July 2015, by Polydor Records, debuting at number one on the UK Albums Chart. As well as it being the fastest-selling debut album in 2015 from a UK signed band, it was also the first number one on the inaugural New Music Fridays release date, marking a moment in history.

To celebrate the launch of the album, a world first interactive ad-break takeover happened on Channel 4, on the evening the album was released. Three exclusive music videos for the band's next single, "Shine", were filmed especially for the initiative, and fans were encouraged to 'take control' of the ad break by tweeting the hashtag for the video they most wanted to see; #ChooseLight, #ChooseShadow or #ChooseDark. The initiative garnered 1.55 million viewers and resulted in the most interacted-with ad in Channel 4 history. "Shine" was released as the band's seventh single, serving as a follow-up to their sixth single, "King". It was released on 5 July 2015, peaking at number 2 on the UK Singles Chart. "Eyes Shut" was released as their eighth single that was to be taken from Communion. The music video for the single was released on 27 September 2015, and the video depicted the band exploring a post-apocalyptic world, set in the outskirts of Sofia, Bulgaria.

In January 2016, Years & Years were nominated for four Brit Awards, including British Group, British Breakthrough Act, British Single (for "King") and British Artist Video (also for "King"). On 2 March 2016, the band announced that Tove Lo would feature on their next single; a new version of, "Desire". The music video was released on the next day, accompanied by an open letter from frontman Olly Alexander on the band's Facebook page. This detailed the concept of the video and highlighted the LGBT issues addressed by it (such as sexuality and gender dynamics), for which Alexander had become something of a spokesperson. The band played their biggest headline show to date on 8 April 2016, at Wembley Arena, London, as part of their 2016 UK headline tour. The show was completely sold out, with support coming from MØ, Nimmo and Mabel. In July 2016, the band released the music video for their next single from Communion, "Worship". The music video was directed by Matt Lambert, with choreography from Ryan Heffington. On 11 September 2016, Years & Years performed the last show of their Communion tour at Lollapalooza in Berlin.

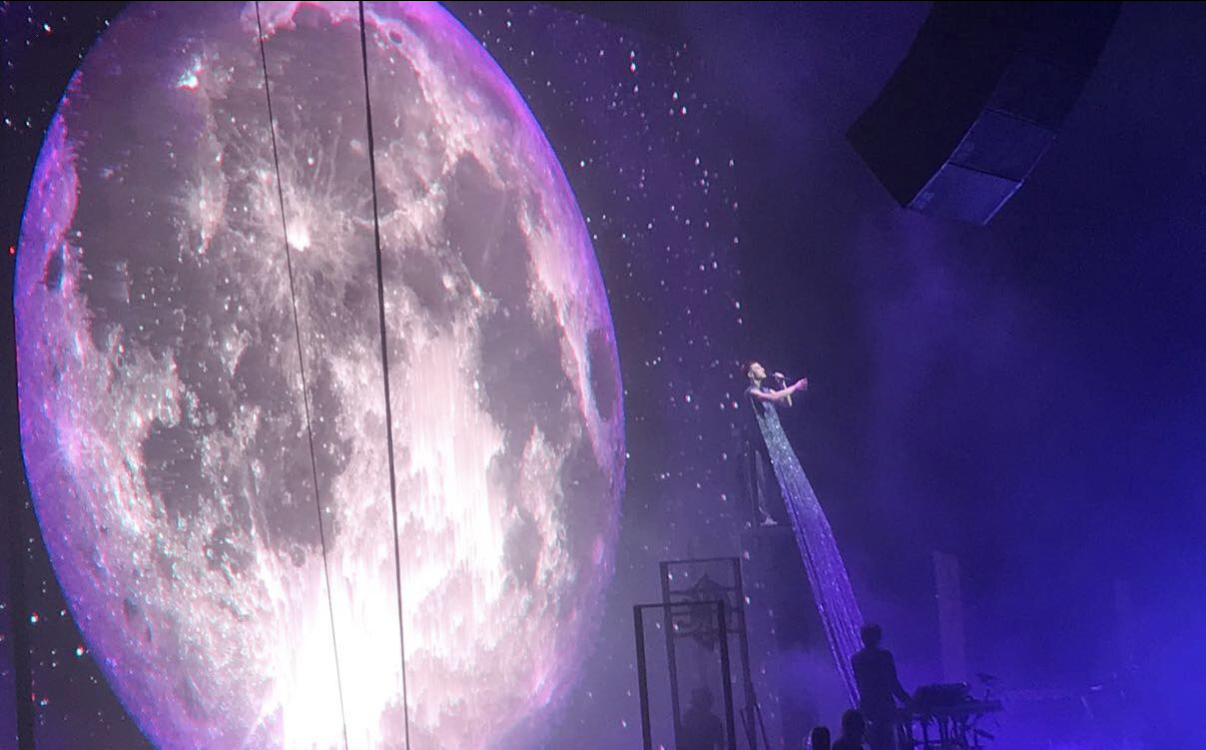
Alexander performing "Palo Santo" at The O2 Arena during the Palo Santo Tour in 2018

=== 2016–2019: Palo Santo ===
On 13 September 2016, the band released the song "Meteorite", which was included on the soundtrack for the film Bridget Jones's Baby. On 28 September 2016, the music video for the song was released.

Alexander later announced that he had been working on new music with Julia Michaels and Justin Tranter. The first single from the album, "Sanctify", was released on 7 March 2018. The song became the number 1 trending video on YouTube within the first 24 hours after its launch. A short interview was released after the music video with Alexander explaining his inspiration for the song came from experiences he had with men who claim to be heterosexual but have desires of other sexualities in which they struggle to embrace.

The second single of the album, called "If You're Over Me", was released on 10 May 2018 with its music video released on 14 May 2018. The single peaked at number 6 in the United Kingdom.

On 18 June 2018, the band announced the European dates to their Palo Santo Tour.

The album's title track, "Palo Santo", was released on 22 June 2018 and "All for You" was released on 27 June 2018, with the album subsequently being released on 6 July 2018. The album received acclaim from critics and reached number 3 on the UK Albums Chart. On 17 September 2018, the music video for "All for You" was released, featuring an angelic Alexander dancing within an abandoned warehouse before transforming into a demonic version of himself and engaging in a dance off with an android.

The band was featured on The Greatest Showman: Reimagined covering "Come Alive" alongside Jess Glynne which was released on 16 November 2018.

In November 2018, "Play", a collaboration with DJ Jax Jones was released. It peaked at number 8 on the UK Official Chart. On 28 January the music video released, this was a supermarket belt which Alexander and Jones danced upon with previous signature Jones brands appearing as supermarket items.

On 14 February 2019, a collaboration with MNEK titled "Valentino" was released.

On 4 March 2019, the band announced that Emre would be taking a hiatus from the band whilst they were touring in Asia. His wife delivered a healthy baby girl called Daphne Türkmen. The group performed at the Glastonbury Festival where Alexander gave a speech that was universally praised by fans and media.

On 11 September 2019, they released a single in collaboration with the Pet Shop Boys called "Dreamland", with Alexander appearing alongside the Pet Shop Boys to perform the song during their headlining slot at Radio 2 Live in Hyde Park. Written in 2017, the track was originally scheduled to be released on the Palo Santo album in 2018 but was ultimately included on the Pet Shop Boys' 2020 album Hotspot.

=== 2021–2023: Shift to solo project, Night Call, dissolution ===
In conjunction with Alexander starring in the 2021 drama series It's a Sin, Years & Years released a cover of the song of the same name, also by the Pet Shop Boys.

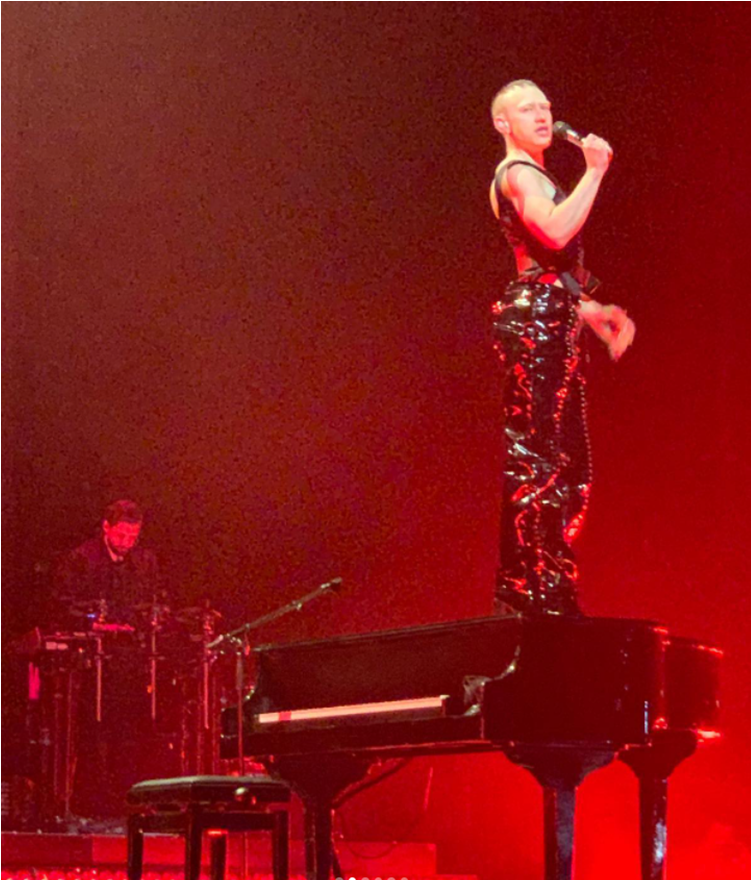
Alexander performing "It's a Sin" during the Night Call Tour at the AO Arena in May 2022.

On 18 March 2021, the band announced through an Instagram post that their upcoming album would essentially be a solo project by Olly Alexander, to be released under the band name. Goldsworthy will still play live as an instrumentalist and Türkmen will focus on his work as a writer and producer. Alexander told Capital FM:

"[T]he honest truth of what happened [is that] me, Mikey and Emre met, like, ten years ago. We've been in this band for a decade, and in that time, we've just kind of grown apart musically, right. We kind of stopped making music together, and when we announced that I was going to be Olly Years & Years, it had kind of been a long time coming, if that makes sense. We all got into a new way of living our lives and working together quite separately. Then after the pandemic, I feel like we had all this time to really reflect on what was going on and it made sense that we kind of went our separate ways. I've been writing all the songs for this new album, and Emre's working on other stuff, he's got his family to raise and so it's just an honest thing. We didn't fall out – we're all mates and stuff – so it's definitely different but I'm really excited as well to kind of do my thing this time."

Regarding his decision to keep the "Years & Years" name, Alexander later explained: "I just didn't want to let Years & Years go. I put so much into it. It was a tricky decision in some ways, because I think, possibly, it might have been a bit simpler for everyone if I had just been like, 'Oh, I'm a solo artist now.' But I just didn't want to. Bands are like marriages. Any separation is difficult, and I think it went as well as it could, with us."

On 23 March 2021, "Starstruck" was announced to be the lead single from Years & Years' upcoming third studio album. The song was released on 8 April 2021 and is Years & Years' first release as a solo project. A remix featuring Australian singer Kylie Minogue was released on 21 May 2021. On 23 September 2021, Years & Years announced the second single, "Crave". The song was released on 28 September 2021 alongside the announcement of his third studio album Night Call. The album was released on 21 January 2022. On 6 October 2021, "A Second to Midnight" was released, a song by Kylie Minogue and Years & Years that appears on the reissue of Minogue's Disco album. In November, Years & Years collaborated with Galantis on the single "Sweet Talker". The BBC announced that Years & Years would headline a New Year's Eve concert special, The Big New Years & Years Eve Party, with guest appearances by Minogue and Pet Shop Boys.

On 15 February 2022, Years & Years released a remix of "Starstruck" featuring J-pop singer SIRUP. On 1 November 2022, Years & Years released a cover of Crystal Waters' 1994 single "100% Pure Love". American retailer Target would use this version for its 2022 holiday campaign.

On 3 June 2023, Years & Years headlined the Mighty Hoopla music festival, sharing the top billing with American singer Kelly Rowland.

=== 2023-2025: Human Family, Eurovision and Alexander's solo career ===
In February 2023, it was announced that Emre Turkmen and Mikey Goldsworthy had formed the duo Human Family and had achieved a label signing under an agreement between BMG and independent publisher Minds On Fire. Their first single, "I Like You", was released in 2025.

On 16 December 2023, it was announced that Olly Alexander would be representing the United Kingdom at the Eurovision Song Contest 2024 using his name instead of Years & Years. Following his Eurovision announcement, he told the BBC that he'd "wanted to do it for a while" and it "felt like this was the right time to start releasing music under my name". His debut solo album, Polari, was released on 7 February 2025.

== Influences ==
The band's influences include Christina Aguilera, Radiohead, Britney Spears, Kylie Minogue, Janet Jackson, Flying Lotus, Marilyn Manson, the Beatles, Jai Paul, Timbaland, Joni Mitchell, Aaliyah, Justin Timberlake, Rihanna, Robyn, Scritti Politti, Sigur Rós and Pet Shop Boys, with whom the group has collaborated with on the Years & Years version of "It's a Sin" and the 2019 PSB single "Dreamland".

During their concerts, the band have performed covers of songs by Blu Cantrell, Katy Perry, Britney Spears, Pet Shop Boys, Ariana Grande, Madonna, Cyndi Lauper, Joni Mitchell, Brandy and Drake.

== Band members ==
Member	Role	Years active (in band)	Ref.
Olly Alexander	Lead Vocals, Keyboards, Synthesizers, Piano	2010 - 2023	
Mikey Goldsworthy	Keyboards, Synthesizers, Bass Guitar	2010 - 2021; 2021-2023 (Touring)	
Emre Türkmen	Keyboards, Synthesizers, Beats, Samples, Sequencers, Laptop, Guitar	2010 - 2021	
Noel Leeman	Keyboards, Synthesizers	2010 - 2013	
Oliver Subria	Drums	2010 - 2013	

Former touring members

- Dylan Bell – drums (2014–2018)
- Paris Jeffree – drums (2018–2023)
- Phebe Edwards – backing vocals (2018–2021)
- Joell Fender – backing vocals (2018–2023)
- Yasmin Green – backing vocals (2022–2023)
- Tehillah Daniel – backing vocals (2022–2023)

== Discography ==
- Communion (2015)
- Palo Santo (2018)
- Night Call (2022)

== Tours ==
- Communion Tour (2015–2016)
- Palo Santo Tour (2018–2019)
- Night Call Tour (2022)

== Awards and nominations ==
Award	Year	Nominee(s)	Category	Result	Ref.
Attitude Awards	2015	Communion	Album of the Year	Won	
BBC Music Awards	2015	Themselves	British Artist of the Year	Nominated	
BBC Radio 1's Teen Awards	2015	"King"	Best British Single	Nominated	
BBC Radio 1's Teen Awards	2015	Themselves	Best British Group	Nominated	
BBC Radio 1's Teen Awards	2018	Themselves	Best British Group	Nominated	
BBC Sound of...	2015	Themselves	Sound of 2015	Won	
Berlin Music Video Awards	2022	"Sweet Talker"	Best Art Direction	Nominated	
Berlin Music Video Awards	2024	"Dizzy"	Best Cinematography	Nominated	
Best Art Vinyl	2022	Night Call	Best Vinyl Art	Nominated	
Brit Awards	2015	Themselves	Critics' Choice	Nominated	
Brit Awards	2016	Themselves	British Breakthrough Act	Nominated	
Brit Awards	2016	Themselves	British Group	Nominated	
Brit Awards	2016	"King"	British Single of the Year	Nominated	
Brit Awards	2016	"King"	British Video of the Year	Eliminated	
Brit Awards	2019	Themselves	British Group	Nominated	
British LGBT Awards	2016	Olly Alexander	Celebrity Rising Star	Nominated	
British LGBT Awards	2016	Themselves	Music Artist	Nominated	
British LGBT Awards	2017	Themselves	Music Artist	Won	
British LGBT Awards	2017	Olly Alexander	Celebrity	Nominated	
British LGBT Awards	2018	"Growing Up Gay"	Media Moment	Nominated	
British LGBT Awards	2020	Themselves	Music Artist	Nominated	
British LGBT Awards	2020	Olly Alexander	Celebrity	Won	
British LGBT Awards	2022	Olly Alexander	Celebrity	Nominated	
British Phonographic Industry	2023	Olly Alexander	Brits Billion Award	Won	
Ciclope Festival	2016	"Worship"	Best Music Video	Nominated	
European Border Breakers Awards	2015	Communion	Album of the Year (UK)	Won	
GLAAD Media Awards	2019	Themselves	Outstanding Music Artist	Nominated	
GQ Awards	2018	Themselves	Best Live Act	Won	
GAFFA Awards (Sweden)	2015	Themselves	Best Foreign New Act	Won	
GAFFA-Prisen Awards	2019	Themselves	Best International Band	Nominated	
Global Awards	2022	Olly Alexander	Best British Act	Nominated	
Global Awards	2022	Olly Alexander	Best Male	Nominated	
Global Awards	2022	Olly Alexander	Best Pop Act	Nominated	
MTV Brand New	2015	Themselves	Brand New For 2015	Nominated	
MTV Europe Music Awards	2015	Themselves	Best Push Act	Nominated	
MTV Europe Music Awards	2015	Themselves	Best UK & Ireland Act	Nominated	
MTV Europe Music Awards	2016	Themselves	Best UK & Ireland Act	Nominated	
MTV Video Music Awards Japan	2015	"King"	Video of the Year	Nominated	
MTV Video Music Awards Japan	2015	"King"	Best New Artist Video – International	Won	
mtvU Woodie Awards	2015	Themselves	Artist to Watch	Won	
Music Week Awards	2023	Olly Alexander	Music & Brand Partnership	Nominated	
Popjustice £20 Music Prize	2014	"Take Shelter"	Best British Pop Single	Nominated	
Popjustice £20 Music Prize	2015	"King"	Best British Pop Single	Nominated	
Q Awards	2015	Themselves	Best New Act	Nominated	
Queerty Awards	2019	"Sanctify"	Anthem	Nominated	
Queerty Awards	2022	"Starstruck" (with Kylie Minogue)	Anthem	Nominated	
Silver Clef Awards	2019	Themselves	Best Group	Won	
UK Music Video Awards	2015	Themselves	Best Artist	Nominated	
UK Music Video Awards	2015	"Shine"	Best Interactive Video	Nominated	
UK Music Video Awards	2015	"King"	Best Pop Video - UK	Nominated	
UK Music Video Awards	2018	"Sanctify"	Best Pop Video - UK	Nominated	
UK Music Video Awards	2018	"If You're Over Me"	Best Styling	Won	
Winq Men of the Year Awards	2015	Themselves	Music Award	Won	
XITE Awards	2015	"King"	Most Played Music Video	Won	

== Projects by former band members ==
=== Exit Kid ===
In 2017, Emre Türkmen formed grunge duo Exit Kid with touring drummer Dylan Bell with the duo releasing a number of EPs while Türkmen continued to be a member of Years & Years. In 2020, Exit Kid released the single "You Got All the World" featuring Türkmen's wife on vocals, with the songs "Out of Time" and "Sura" being released in 2022.
