= Jax Jones discography =

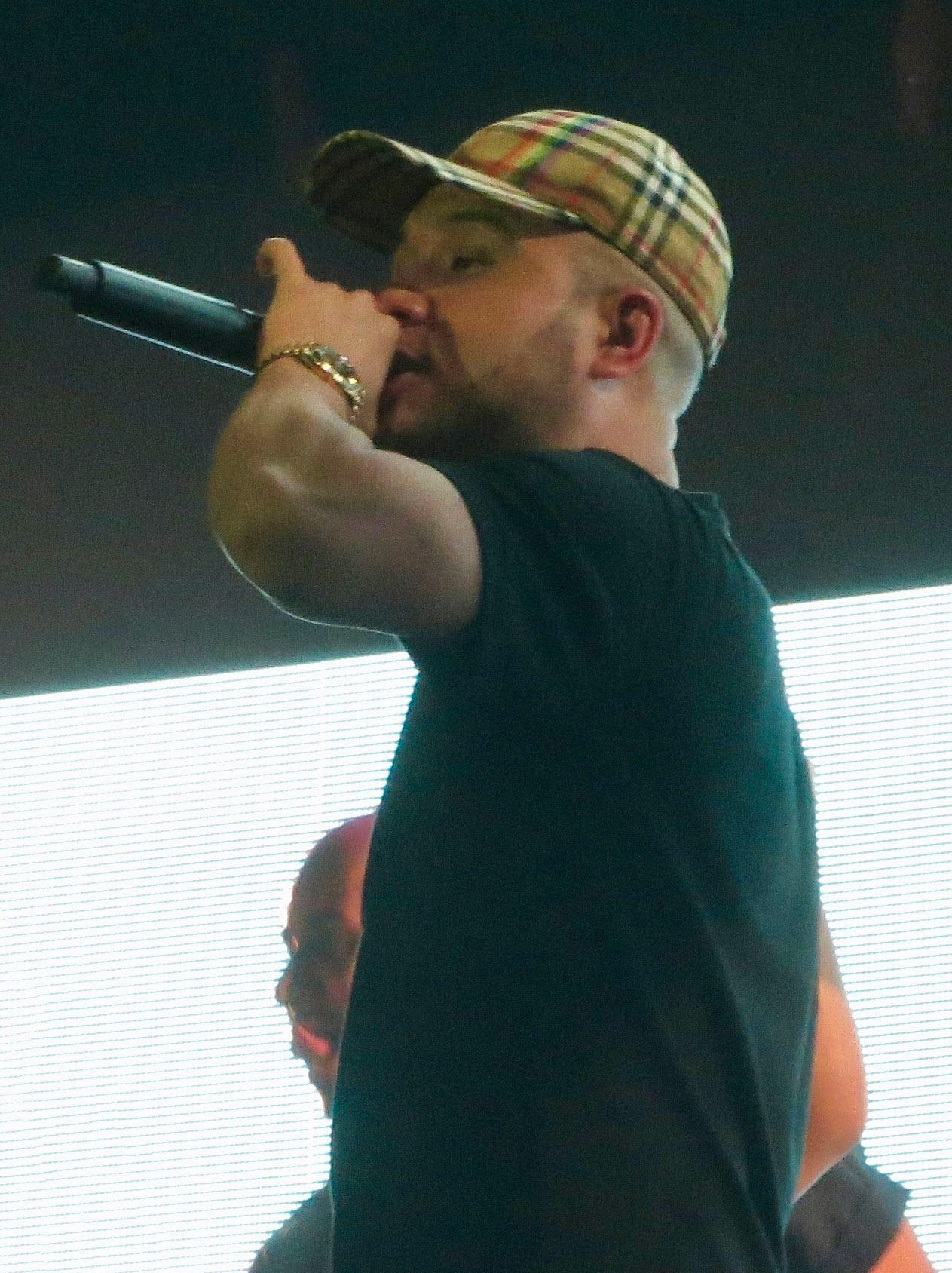
- Studio albums: 1
- EPs: 3
- Singles: 34
- Remixes: 12

English DJ Jax Jones has released one studio album, three EPs and thirty-two singles, including one as a featured artist. His debut album Snacks (Supersize) was released on 6 September 2019.

== Studio albums ==
Title	Details	Peak chart positions
Title	Details	AUS
Snacks (Supersize)	Released: 6 September 2019; Label: Polydor, Universal; Formats: CD, LP, digital download, streaming	54

== Extended plays ==
Title	Details	Peak chart positions						Certifications
Title	Details	UK	UK Dance	BEL (Fl)	IRE	NLD	NOR	Certifications
Snacks	Released: 28 November 2018; Label: Universal; Formats: Digital download, streaming	9	1	38	10	42	17	BPI: Platinum
Midnight Snacks (Part 1)	Released: 13 December 2019; Label: Universal; Formats: Digital download, streaming	—	—	—	—	—	—	
Deep Joy	Released: 2 July 2021; Label: Universal; Formats: Digital download, streaming	—	—	—	—	—	—	
"—" denotes a recording that did not chart or was not released.

== Singles ==
=== As lead artist ===
Title	Year	Peak chart positions										Certifications	Album
Title	Year	UK	AUS	BEL (WA)	CAN	FRA	GER	IRE	ITA	SCO	SWE	Certifications	Album
"Go Deep"	2013	—	—	—	—	—	—	—	—	—	—		Non-album singles
"Yeah Yeah Yeah"	2015	—	—	—	—	—	—	—	—	—	—		Non-album singles
"House Work" (featuring Mike Dunn and MNEK)	2016	85	—	—	—	—	—	92	—	60	—	BPI: Gold	Snacks
"You Don't Know Me" (featuring Raye)	2016	3	12	2	70	2	3	3	9	3	6	BPI: 3× Platinum; ARIA: 3× Platinum; BEA: 2× Platinum; BVMI: 3× Gold; FIMI: 3× Platinum; GLF: 2× Platinum; MC: 2× Platinum; SNEP: Diamond	Snacks
"Instruction" (featuring Demi Lovato and Stefflon Don)	2017	13	72	23	—	184	31	29	—	10	94	BPI: Platinum; ARIA: Gold; BVMI: Gold; FIMI: Gold; GLF: Gold; MC: Gold; SNEP: Gold	Snacks
"Breathe" (featuring Ina Wroldsen)	2017	7	—	6	—	81	15	4	—	5	— (Note: "Breathe" did not enter the Swedish Singellista chart, but peaked at number two on the Swedish Heatseeker chart.)	BPI: Platinum; ARIA: Platinum; BEA: Gold; BVMI: Platinum; FIMI: Gold; MC: Platinum	Snacks
"Ring Ring" (Note: "Ring Ring" also features on Mabel's debut extended play Ivy to Roses and debut studio album High Expectations.) (featuring Mabel and Rich the Kid)	2018	12	—	36	—	—	—	15	—	9	— (Note: "Ring Ring" did not enter the Swedish Singellista Chart, but peaked at number 10 on the Swedish Heatseeker Chart.)	BPI: Platinum	Snacks
"Play" (Note: "Play" also features on Years & Years' second studio album Palo Santo.) (with Years & Years)	2018	8	—	46	—	—	—	19	—	9	—	BPI: Platinum	Snacks
"All Day and Night" (with Martin Solveig and Madison Beer)	2019	10	—	14	—	82	85	7	—	7	—	BPI: Platinum; BVMI: Gold; FIMI: Gold; MC: Gold; SNEP: Gold	Snacks
"One Touch" (Note: "One Touch" also features on Jess Glynne's second studio album Always In Between.) (with Jess Glynne)	2019	19	—	— (Note: "One Touch" did not enter the Flemish Ultratop chart, but peaked at number 38 on the Ultratip chart.)	—	—	—	28	—	8	— (Note: "One Touch" did not enter the Swedish Singellista Chart, but peaked at number six on the Swedish Heatseeker Chart.)	BPI: Platinum	Snacks
"Harder" (with Bebe Rexha)	2019	23	—	— (Note: "Harder" did not enter the Flemish Ultratop chart, but peaked at number 39 on the Ultratip chart.)	—	—	—	24	—	12	64	BPI: Gold; ARIA: Gold	Snacks
"Jacques" (Note: "Jacques" also features on Tove Lo's fourth studio album Sunshine Kitty.) (with Tove Lo)	2019	67	—	—	—	—	—	65	—	—	61		Snacks (Supersize)
"This Is Real" (with Ella Henderson)	2019	9	—	—	—	—	—	14	—	3	—	BPI: Platinum	Snacks (Supersize)
"Tequila" (with Martin Solveig and Raye)	2020	21	—	—	—	—	—	19	—	14	—	BPI: Gold	Non-album singles
"I Miss U" (with Au/Ra)	2020	25	64	—	—	—	88	32	—	17	—	BPI: Silver; ARIA: Platinum	Non-album singles
"Feels"	2021	—	—	—	—	—	—	—	—	—	—		Deep Joy
"Crystallise" (featuring Jem Cooke)	2021	—	—	—	—	—	—	—	—	—	—		Deep Joy
"Out Out" (with Joel Corry featuring Charli XCX and Saweetie)	2021	6	31	17	69	114	20	2	92	—	88	BPI: Platinum; ARIA: Gold; BVMI: Gold; FIMI: Gold; SNEP: Gold	Another Friday Night
"Phases" (with Sinéad Harnett)	2021	—	—	—	—	—	—	—	—	—	—		Pokémon 25: The Album
"Where Did You Go?" (featuring MNEK)	2022	7	40	15	76	79	27	5	—	—	—	BPI: 2× Platinum; ARIA: Platinum; BVMI: Gold; FIMI: Gold; SNEP: Gold	Non-album single
"Good Luck" (with Mabel and Galantis)	2022	45	—	—	—	—	—	50	—	—	—		About Last Night...
"Lonely Heart" (with Martin Solveig and Gracey)	2022	70	—	—	—	—	—	97	—	—	—		Non-album singles
"Whistle" (with Calum Scott)	2023	14	—	—	—	—	59	17	—	—	—	BPI: Platinum	Non-album singles
"Me and My Guitar" (featuring Fireboy DML)	2023	—	—	—	—	—	—	—	—	—	—		Non-album singles
"Need You Now" (with D.O.D.)	2023	—	—	—	—	—	—	—	—	—	—		Non-album singles
"Won't Forget You" (with D.O.D. and Ina Wroldsen)	2023	28	—	—	—	—	—	—	—	—	—	BPI: Silver	Non-album singles
"Forever" (with RobbieG)	2023	—	—	—	—	—	—	—	—	—	—		Non-album singles
"Never Be Lonely" (with Zoe Wees)	2024	41	—	—	—	—	44	81	—	—	—	BPI: Silver	Non-album singles
"Tonight (D.I.Y.A)" (with Jason Derulo and Joel Corry)	2024	—	—	—	—	—	—	—	—	—	—		Non-album singles
"Love the Way You Lie" (with Norma Jean Martine)	2024	—	—	—	—	—	—	—	—	—	—		Non-album singles
"Bad Boys" (with Rebecca Black and sooyeon)	2025	—	—	—	—	—	—	—	—	—	—		Non-album singles
"Back In My Bed" (with Meyy)	2025	—	—	—	—	—	—	—	—	—	—		Non-album singles
"Stereo" (featuring Emei)	2025	—	—	—	—	—	—	—	—	—	—		Non-album singles
"Sidewinder" (with D Double E)	2026	—	—	—	—	—	—	—	—	—	—		Non-album singles
"Pulling Me Back"	2026	—	—	—	—	—	—	—	—	—	—		Non-album singles
"Last Day of Summer" (with Katy B)	2026	—	—	—	—	—	—	—	—	—	—		TBA
"—" denotes a single that did not chart or was not released.

=== As featured artist ===
Title	Year	Peak chart positions									Certifications	Album
Title	Year	UK	AUS	AUT	BEL (Fl)	DEN	FRA	GER	IRE	SWI	Certifications	Album
"I Got U" (Duke Dumont featuring Jax Jones)	2014	1	17	19	14	36	35	22	1	23	BPI: 2× Platinum; ARIA: Platinum; BVMI: Gold; FIMI: Platinum; IFPI DEN: Gold	EP1

== Production and songwriting credits ==
Title	Year	Artist(s)	Album	Credits
"Dumb"	2013	Tich	What I'm Meant to Say	Co-writer; producer
"Can We Dance"	2013	The Vamps	Meet the Vamps	Co-writer
"Won't Look Back"	2014	Duke Dumont	EP1	Co-writer; producer
"Ocean Drive"	2015	Duke Dumont	Blasé Boys Club Part 1	Co-writer
"The Valley"	2016	Clare Maguire	Stranger Things Have Happened	Co-writer
"Text from Your Ex" (featuring Tinashe)	2017	Tinie Tempah	Youth	Co-writer; producer
"Strong"	2022	Sigma	Hope	Co-writer

== Remixes ==
Title	Year	Artist(s)
"Won't Look Back"	2014	Duke Dumont
"If You Wait"	2014	London Grammar
"Ready for the Good Life"	2014	Paloma Faith
"Talking Body"	2015	Tove Lo
"Shine"	2015	Years & Years
"Impossible"	2015	Lion Babe
"On My Mind"	2015	Ellie Goulding
"WTF (Where They From)"	2016	Missy Elliott
"House Work" (Carnival VIP)	2016	Jax Jones
"After the Afterparty"	2016	Charli XCX
"Say a Prayer"	2017	Tieks, Chaka Khan, and Popcaan
"Late Night Feelings" (Midnight Snack Remix)	2019	Mark Ronson and Lykke Li
"This is Real" (Midnight Snack Remix)	2019	Jax Jones featuring Ella Henderson
"Pump It Up" (Midnight Snack Remix)	2020	Endor
"Say So" (Midnight Snack Remix)	2020	Doja Cat
"Break My Heart" (Midnight Snack Remix)	2020	Dua Lipa
"Prisoner"	2021	Miley Cyrus featuring Dua Lipa
"Thank You"	2021	Diana Ross
"Shivers"	2021	Ed Sheeran
"Where Did You Go?" (Midnight Snack Remix)	2022	Jax Jones and MNEK
"Padam Padam”	2023	Kylie Minogue
"Feel It"	2023	Jazzy
"Show"	2023	Ado
"One by One”	2024	Robin Schulz and Topic featuring Oaks
"Chyba że z Tobą”	2024	Modelki
"Ain't No Mountain High Enough”	2024	Cascada
"Pedro”	2024	Jaxomy, Agatino Romero, and Raffaella Carrà
"Stay Gold” (Jax Jones Y2J! Remix)	2025	Jax Jones featuring Ado
"Said It All” (Jax Jones Rework)	2026	Take That featuring Leony and Jax Jones
"Bangaranga”	2026	Dara
