= Snacks (Supersize) =

Studio album by Jax Jones
- Released: 6 September 2019
- Recorded: 2015–2019
- Genre: Electropop; EDM; house
- Length: 48:01
- Label: Polydor; Universal
- Producer: Jax Jones; Mark Ralph; Martin Solveig; Steve Mac; Secondcity; Tieks; Tommy Forest

Jax Jones chronology
Snacks (2018)	Snacks (Supersize) (2019)	Midnight Snacks (Part 1) (2019)

Singles from Snacks (Supersize)
- 1. "Jacques" Released: 28 August 2019; 2. "This Is Real" Released: 21 October 2019

Snacks (Supersize) is the debut album by British DJ and record producer Jax Jones, released on 6 September 2019 through Polydor Records. The album expands on his previous release, his 2018 EP Snacks as part of an experimental release strategy that involved new singles being added to the EP as they were released before the addition of six new songs for the release of the full album. In the weeks preceding the release, a brand new collaboration with Tove Lo titled "Jacques" was released as the lead single whilst the Ella Henderson collaboration "This Is Real" was promoted during the week of release. It was released as the album's second single on 21 October 2019.

== Background ==
Snacks was originally released in November 2018 as an EP of 5 songs Jones had already released. Between the EP's release and July 2019, a number of other singles were added to the EP expanding it to 9 songs. The head of marketing at Polydor Records, Stephen Hallowes, noted during an interview with Music Week that this was all part of their release strategy to "reimagine the album as an ever-evolving playlist that would update on an on-going basis and eventually culminate in a full album release with extra songs".

Hallows further explained the "main purpose was to create one destination for fans to listen to all of Jax’s hits, but it also enabled us to start building an album story with [Jones] over time, which felt like a good strategy for an artist much stronger in the singles market than albums." Jones told the Official Charts Company that he did not anticipate releasing an album, he said "because I don't sing my music, some people might only be a fan of one or two of my songs". Jones said that it is "so exciting to have an album with all my hits and new songs in one place [...] when you work with the names I did on the album, it makes you bring your A-game". He further explained that his second single, 2016's "You Don't Know Me" featuring Raye, "defined my sound and now I'm so happy to say the record is done".

Jones' own vocals appear on the song "All 4 You" and there might be plans to continue releasing new songs as part of Snacks including a song with Raye, who already features on the single "You Don't Know Me".

== Critical reception ==
Professional ratings
Review scores
Source	Rating
Clash	7/10

Narzra Ahmed from Clash praised the album for containing many hit songs, writing: "Jones has put together an impressive collection of insanely catchy songs. It's not easy to come by an album which contains hit after hit like this does. It is a joy to listen to."

== Promotion ==
During its week of release, Snacks (Supersize) was promoted with the song "This is Real" featuring fellow British singer-songwriter Ella Henderson. In support of the album, Jones also launched his own Snacks-themed comedy game show on YouTube.

Jones toured in support of the album in 2020, with the tour including pyrotechnics, dancers and inflatables.

== Track listing ==
Snacks (Supersize) track listing
No.	Title	Writer(s)	Producer(s)	Length
1.	"House Work" (featuring Mike Dunn and MNEK)	Timucin Aluo; Uzoechi Emenike	Jax Jones	4:57
2.	"Jacques" (with Tove Lo)	Aluo; Emenike; Tove Nilsson; Mark Ralph	Jones; Ralph^{[a]}	3:23
3.	"You Don't Know Me" (featuring Raye)	Aluo; Emenike; Rachel Keen; Janée Bennett; Walter Merziger; Arno Kammermeier; Peter Hayo; Patrick Bodmer; Philip D. Young	Jones; Ralph^{[b]}	4:26
4.	"Harder" (with Bebe Rexha)	Aluo; Bleta Rexha; Steve McCutcheon; Camille Purcell	Jones; Steve Mac	2:39
5.	"Ring Ring" (with Mabel featuring Rich the Kid)	Aluo; Emenike; Mabel McVey; Ralph; Marlon McVey-Roudette; Purcell	Jones; Ralph	3:36
6.	"Instruction" (featuring Demi Lovato and Stefflon Don)	Aluo; Emenike; Demetria Lovato; Stephanie Allen	Jones; Ralph^{[b]}	2:56
7.	"Play" (with Years & Years)	Aluo; Emenike; Oliver Thornton; Ralph	Jones; Ralph^{[a]}	3:06
8.	"100 Times"	Aluo; Emenike; Ralph; James Norton	Jones; Ralph^{[a]}	3:07
9.	"Breathe" (featuring Ina Wroldsen)	Aluo; Emenike; Fredrik Gibson; Ina Wroldsen; William Clarke	Jones; Ralph^{[b]}	3:49
10.	"Cruel"	Aluo; Emenike; Madison Love; Ralph; Brett McLaughlin	Jones; Ralph^{[a]}	4:26
11.	"All Day and Night" (with Martin Solveig and Madison Beer)	Aluo; Martin Picandet; Ralph; Rebecca Hill; Purcell; Hailee Steinfeld; Bennett	Jones; Martin Solveig; Ralph^{[a]}	2:48
12.	"One Touch" (with Jess Glynne)	Aluo; Jessica Glynne; Bennett	Jones; Ralph	3:18
13.	"All 4 U"	Aluo; Emenike; Robert Harvey; Norton; Rowan John Harrington	Jones; Ralph^{[a]}; Secondcity^{[b]}; Tieks^{[b]}	3:09
14.	"This Is Real" (with Ella Henderson)	Aluo; Emenike; Gabriella Henderson; Maegan Cottone	Jones; Ralph^{[a]}; Tommy Forest^{[b]}	3:19
15.	"Tequila Time (Outro)"	Aluo; Jamie Lidell	Jones; Ralph^{[b]}	2:48
Total length:				48:01

Japan bonus tracks
No.	Title	Writer(s)	Producer(s)	Length
16.	"All Day and Night" (with Martin Solveig and Madison Beer) (Axwell Remix)	Aluo; Picandet; Ralph; Hill; Purcell; Steinfeld; Bennett	Jones; Picandet; Ralph^{[a]}	3:21
17.	"Play" (with Years & Years) (Illyus & Barrientos Remix)	Aluo; Emenike; Thornton; Ralph	Jones; Ralph^{[a]}	3:31
18.	"You Don't Know Me" (featuring Raye) (Sonny Fodera Remix)	Aluo; Emenike; Keen; Bennett; Merziger; Kammermeier; Hayo; Bodmer; Philip D. Young	Jones; Ralph^{[b]}	6:14
Total length:				61:18

Notes

- ^{^[a]} signifies a co-producer.
- ^{^[b]} signifies an additional producer.
- "100 Times" features uncredited vocals from MNEK.
- "Cruel" features uncredited vocals from Madison Love.
- "All 4 U" features uncredited vocals from Boy Matthews and Robert Harvey.

== Charts ==
Chart performance for Snacks (Supersize)
Chart (2019)	Peak position
Australian Albums (ARIA)	54
