= List of awards and nominations received by MNEK =

MNEK awards and nominations
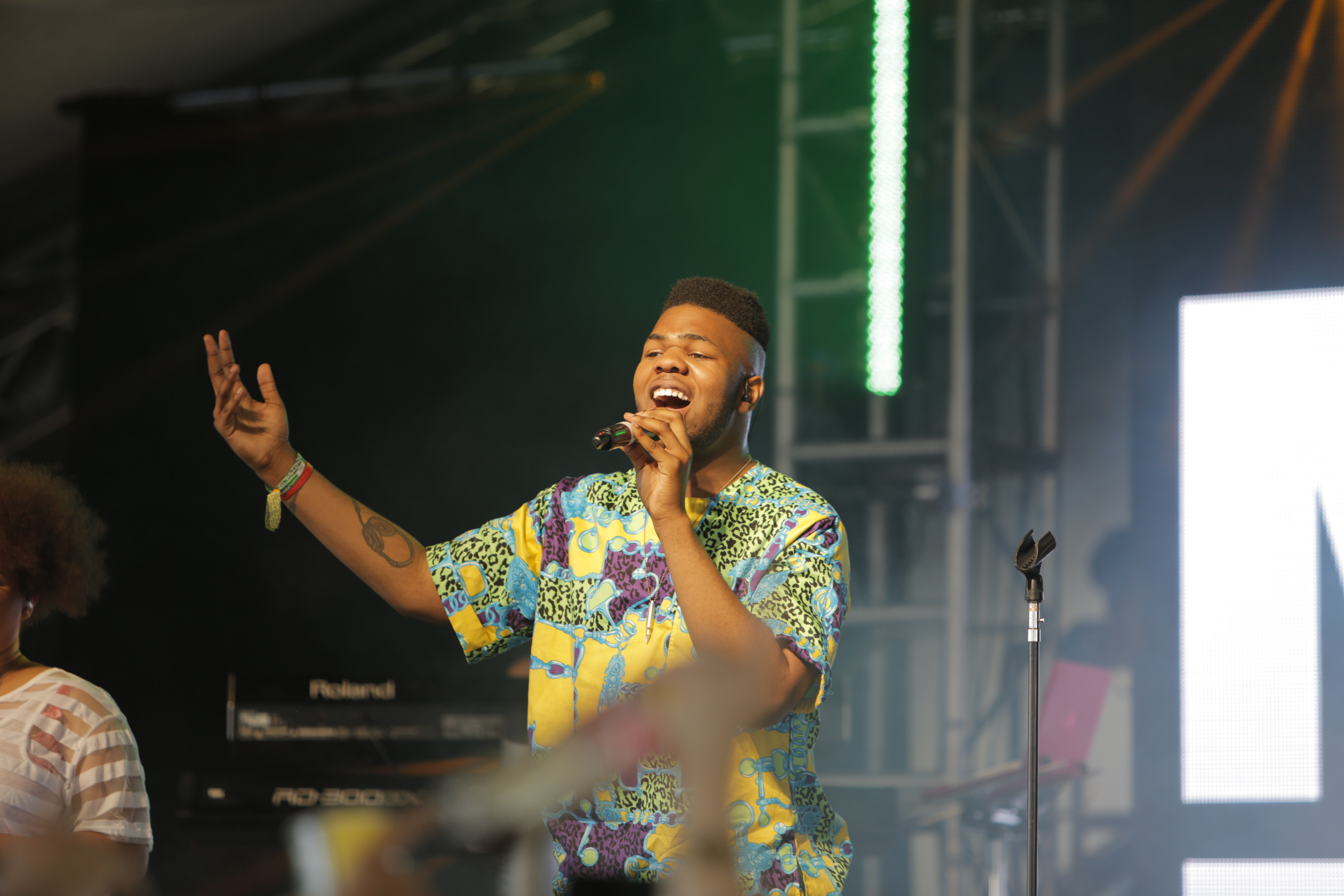
- MNEK performing at 2014 Glastonbury Festival
Awards and nominations
Award	Wins	Nominations
BET Awards	0	1
Grammy Awards	0	2
BRIT Awards	0	1
Latin American Music Awards	0	1
MOBO Awards	0	1

Totals (Note: Certain award groups do not simply award one winner. They acknowledge several different recipients, have runners-up, and have third place. Since this is a specific recognition and is different from losing an award, runner-up mentions are considered wins in this award tally. For simplification and to avoid errors, each award in this list has been presumed to have had a prior nomination.)
- Wins: 10
- Nominations: 15

This is a list of awards and nominations received by MNEK.

== Awards and nominations ==
Award	Year (Note: Indicates the year of ceremony. Each year is linked to the article about the awards held that year, wherever possible.)	Recipient(s) and nominee(s)	Category	Result	Ref.
APRA Music Awards of 2022	2022	"Head & Heart" featuring MNEK	Most Performed Dance/Electronic Work	Won	
APRA Music Awards of 2022	2022	"Head & Heart" featuring MNEK	Most Performed Australian Work	Won	
ASCAP London Awards	2016	Himself	Vanguard Award	Won	
ASCAP London Awards	2017	"Never Forget You"	Top EDM Song	Won	
ASCAP London Awards	2017	"Never Forget You"	Winning Song	Won	
ASCAP London Awards	2018	"You Don't Know Me"	Winning Song	Won	
ASCAP Pop Music Awards	2017	"Never Forget You"	Winning Song	Won	
ASCAP Rhythm & Soul Music Awards	2017	"Hold Up"	Winning Song	Won	
Attitude Awards	2016	Himself	Breakout Artist of the Year	Won	
BET Awards	2015	Himself	Best International Act: UK	Nominated	
BBC Sound of...	2014	Himself	Sound of 2014	Longlisted	
Brit Awards	2021	"Head & Heart"	Song of the Year	Nominated	
British LGBT Awards	2021	Himself	Music Artist	Nominated	
Electronic Music Awards	2022	Himself	Best Vocalist	Nominated	
Electronic Music Awards	2022	"Where Did You Go?" (with Jax Jones)	UK House Song of the Year	Nominated	
Grammy Awards	2014	"Need U (100%)"	Best Dance Recording	Nominated	
Grammy Awards	2026	"Midnight Sun"	Best Dance Pop Recording	Nominated	
Hungarian Music Awards	2021	"Head & Heart"	Best Foreign Electronic Recording	Nominated	
Ivor Novello Awards	2021	"Head & Heart"	Most Performed Work	Nominated	
Ivor Novello Awards	2021	Himself	Songwriter of the Year	Nominated	
Latin American Music Awards	2016	"Never Forget You" (with Zara Larsson)	Favorite Dance Song	Nominated	
MOBO Awards	2014	Himself	Best Newcomer	Nominated	
Queerty Awards	2019	"Colour"	Queer Anthem	Nominated	
Radio Disney Music Awards	2017	"Never Forget You" (with Zara Larsson)	Best Dance Track	Nominated	
Scandipop Awards	2016	"Never Forget You" (with Zara Larsson)	Best Video	Won	
Teen Choice Awards	2016	"Never Forget You" (with Zara Larsson)	Choice Music: Break-Up Song	Nominated	
UK Music Video Awards	2018	"Blinded by Your Grace, Pt. 2"	Best Pop Video - UK	Nominated	
UK Music Video Awards	2026	"Reverse"	Best Pop/R&B/Soul/Jazz Video – Newcomer	Pending	
