= Europa (musical duo) =

Musical duo consists of Jax Jones and Martin Solveig

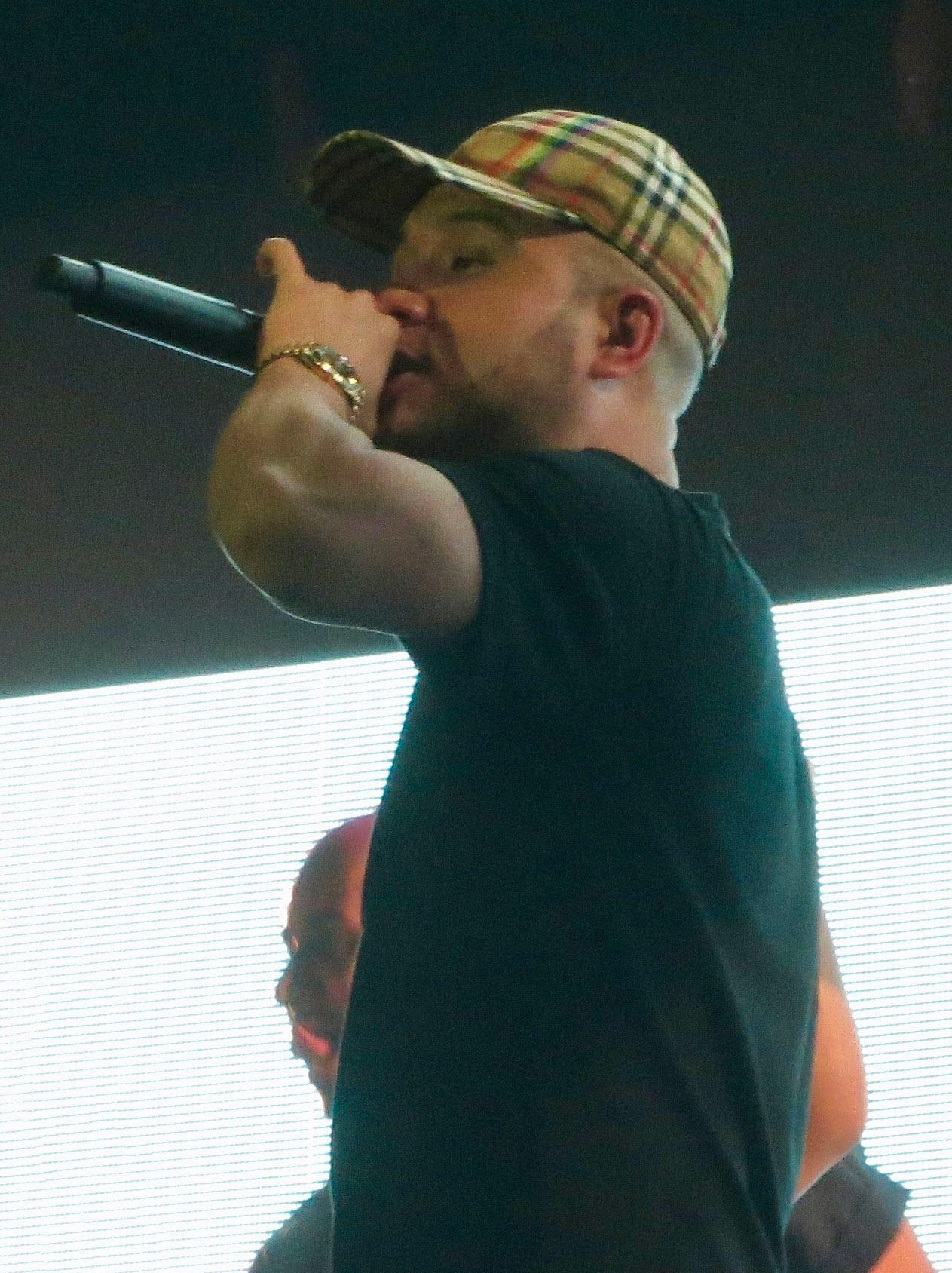
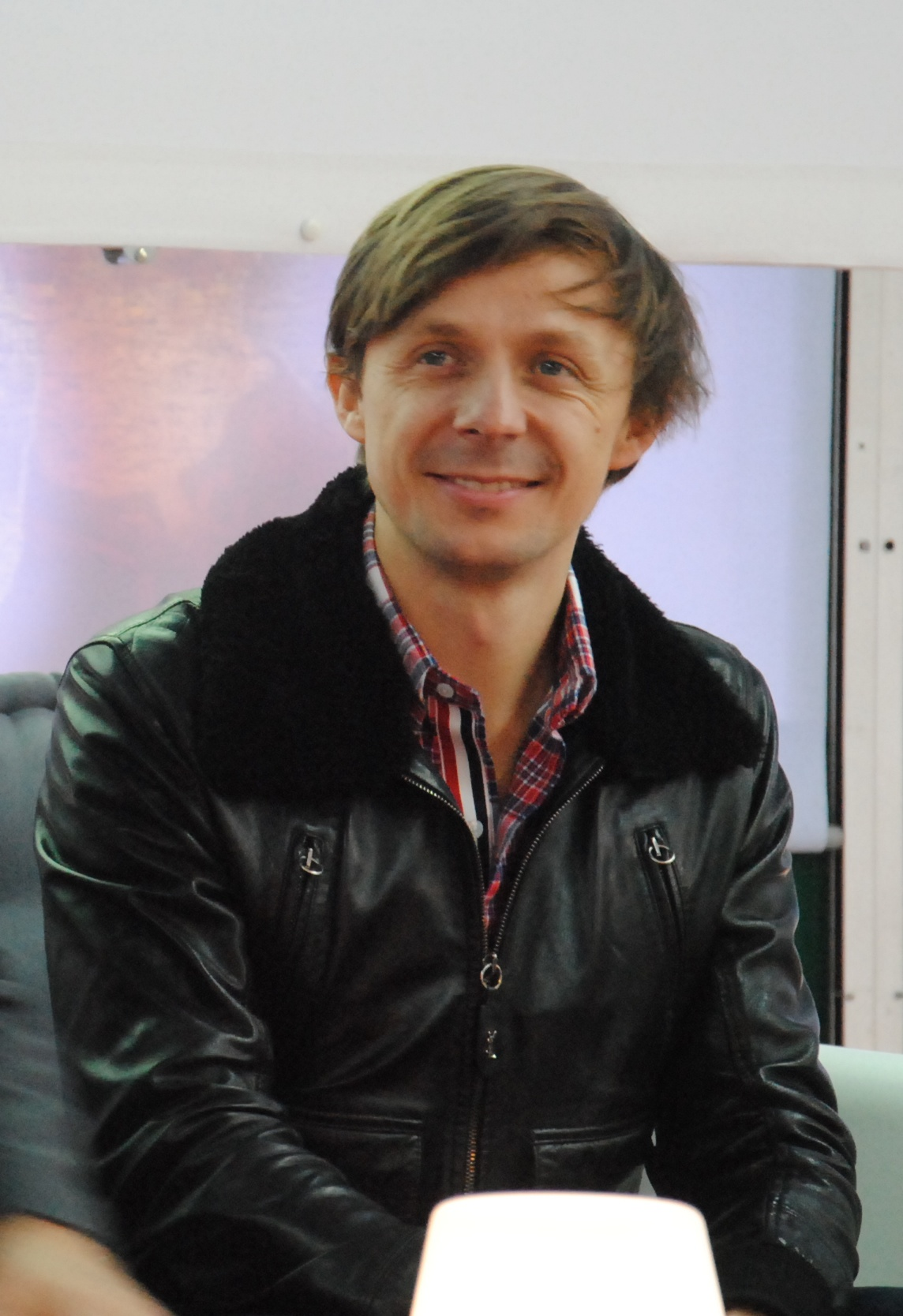
- Jax Jones (left) and Martin Solveig

Background information
- Also known as: Jax Jones and Martin Solveig
- Genre: House
- Years active: 2019–present
- Members: Jax Jones; Martin Solveig

Europa is a musical duo created by DJ Jax Jones and Martin Solveig in 2019. Jones teased the formation of Europa as well as their first track on Twitter on 26 March 2019. It was released later the same year titled "All Day and Night" wherein the artists collaborated with Madison Beer as the featuring artist. It would go on to feature in Jones' album, Snacks (Supersize). The duo created their second single with Raye titled "Tequila" in February 2020, which was released as a non-album single.

== Background ==
In an interview with Capital, Jones talked about the beginning of the project. He jokingly remarked that it was, "born out of a mutual admiration and cemented by a hug". He also revealed that it all started when Martin invited him to a play and their friendship developed, which led to the formation of the group.

== Discography ==
=== Singles ===
Title	Year	Peak chart positions									Certifications	Album
Title	Year	UK	UK Dance	AUT	BEL (Fl)	GER	IRE	SCO	SWE	SWI	Certifications	Album
"All Day and Night" (Note: "All Day and Night" also features on Jax Jones' EP, Snacks.) (with Madison Beer)	2019	10	2	60	14	85	7	7	—	77	BPI: Platinum	Europa
"Tequila" (with Raye)	2020	21	2	—	—	—	46	19	—	—	BPI: Gold	Europa
"Lonely Heart" (with Gracey)	2022	71	27	—	—	—	97	—	—	—		Europa
