= Housework (disambiguation) =

Housework is the act of overseeing the organisational, day-to-day operations of a house, known in North America as "homemaking".

Housework or House Work may also refer to:

- House Work (novel), a 1994 novel by Kristina McGrath
- "House Work" (song), a 2016 song by Jax Jones
- "Housework" (Bluey), a 2021 episode of Australian children's program Bluey
- Housework (play), an Australian play by Emily Steel, premiering in February 2025

== See also ==
- Houseworks Records
