= Tequila (Jax Jones, Martin Solveig and Raye song) =

2020 single by Jax Jones, Martin Solveig and Raye

Single by Europa and Raye

from the album Europa
- Released: 21 February 2020
- Length: 3:30
- Label: Polydor
- Composers: Timucin Aluo; Martin Solveig; Mark Ralph; Jamie Spinks
- Lyricists: Uzoechi Emenike; Rachel Keen; Janee Bennett
- Producers: Jax Jones; Alex Tepper (add.); Ralph (add.); Solveig (add.)

Jax Jones singles chronology
"This Is Real" (2019)	"Tequila" (2020)	"I Miss U" (2020)

Martin Solveig singles chronology
"Juliet & Romeo" (2019)	"Tequila" (2020)	"No Lie" (2020)

Raye singles chronology
"Make It to Heaven" (2019)	"Tequila" (2020)	"Secrets" (2020)

Music video
- "Tequila" on YouTube

"Tequila" is a song by British DJ Jax Jones and French DJ Martin Solveig under their alias Europa, with vocals from British singer-songwriter Raye, released as a single on 21 February 2020. While this marks the first time Solveig and Raye collaborated, it is the second time Jones and Raye, as well as Jones and Solveig worked together, on "You Don't Know Me" and "All Day and Night", respectively.

== Background ==
Jones first introduced the song at the Brooklyn nightclub "Elsewhere" on 20 April 2019. The song was then described as "characteristically bass-heavy" and "uptempo". During an interview on 23 January 2020, Raye revealed that the song would be out soon and that it is the "only other record" her and Jones had written together. On 4 February 2020, Jones posted a clip of himself preparing a meal in the kitchen with a snippet of the song playing as he opens a pot. He went on to post a clip of the trio at the video set in front of a green screen.

== Cover art ==
The cover was revealed on 17 February 2020 and shows a red BMW E30 M3 with stereotypical Mexican illustrations in the background.

== Charts ==
=== Weekly charts ===
Chart (2020)	Peak position
Czech Republic Airplay (ČNS IFPI)	48
Hungary (Dance Top 40)	21
Hungary (Rádiós Top 40)	15
Ireland (IRMA)	19
New Zealand Hot Singles (RMNZ)	32
Russia Airplay (TopHit)	71
Scottish Singles Sales (Official Charts)	14
Slovakia Airplay (ČNS IFPI)	39
UK Singles (Official Charts)	21
UK Dance (Official Charts)	2
US Hot Dance/Electronic Songs (Billboard)	39

=== Year-end charts ===
Chart (2020)	Position
Hungary (Dance Top 40)	77
Hungary (Rádiós Top 40)	87

Chart (2021)	Position
Hungary (Dance Top 40)	71

== Certifications ==
Region	Certification	Certified units/sales
United Kingdom (BPI)	Gold	400,000^{‡}
^{‡} Sales+streaming figures based on certification alone.
