= This Is Real =

2019 song by Jax Jones and Ella Henderson

Single by Jax Jones featuring Ella Henderson

from the album Snacks (Supersize)
- Released: 21 October 2019
- Recorded: 2019
- Studio: Metropolis (London, UK)
- Genre: Dance-pop
- Length: 3:19
- Label: Polydor; Universal
- Songwriters: Timucin Aluo; Uzoechi Emenike; Gabriella Henderson; Maegan Cottone
- Producers: Jax Jones; Mark Ralph; Tommy Forest

Jax Jones singles chronology
| "Jacques" (2019) | "This Is Real" (2019) | "Tequila" (2020) |

Ella Henderson singles chronology
| "Young" (2019) | "This Is Real" (2019) | "We Got Love" (2019) |

Music video
- "This Is Real" on YouTube

"This Is Real" is a song by British DJ and record producer Jax Jones featuring British singer and songwriter Ella Henderson. The song was released as a digital download on 21 October 2019 as the second single from his debut studio album Snacks (Supersize). The song peaked at number nine on the UK Singles Chart.

== Background ==
On 15 August 2019, Jones spoke to Capital Breakfast about his then upcoming debut album Snacks (Supersize) (2019), confirming collaborations with Raye and Ella Henderson for the album. Jones described the latter as having an "amazing voice". Then in an interview on 17 August Jones spoke to The Big Top 40's Will Manning where he revealed that the Henderson collaboration was called "This is Real." During this interview it was also revealed that Henderson and Jones wrote the song but Henderson's record label (at the time this was Syco Music) said "you can't put this out you're not relevant". Jones determined to release the song in some format subsequently took the recording to American singer Selena Gomez who recorded a version of the song but for similar reasons, Gomez's label also rejected the song.

Although Jones ended up with two versions of the song, he stated it felt right to release the version featuring Henderson's vocal as the pair wrote the song together. The version of "This is Real" which was released features Henderson's original vocals from the first recording of the song, prior to Gomez's version. Reflecting back on how the collaboration came about, Henderson said that she and Jones were friends as Jones' wife used to babysit her when she was younger. The duo recorded the song back in 2014.

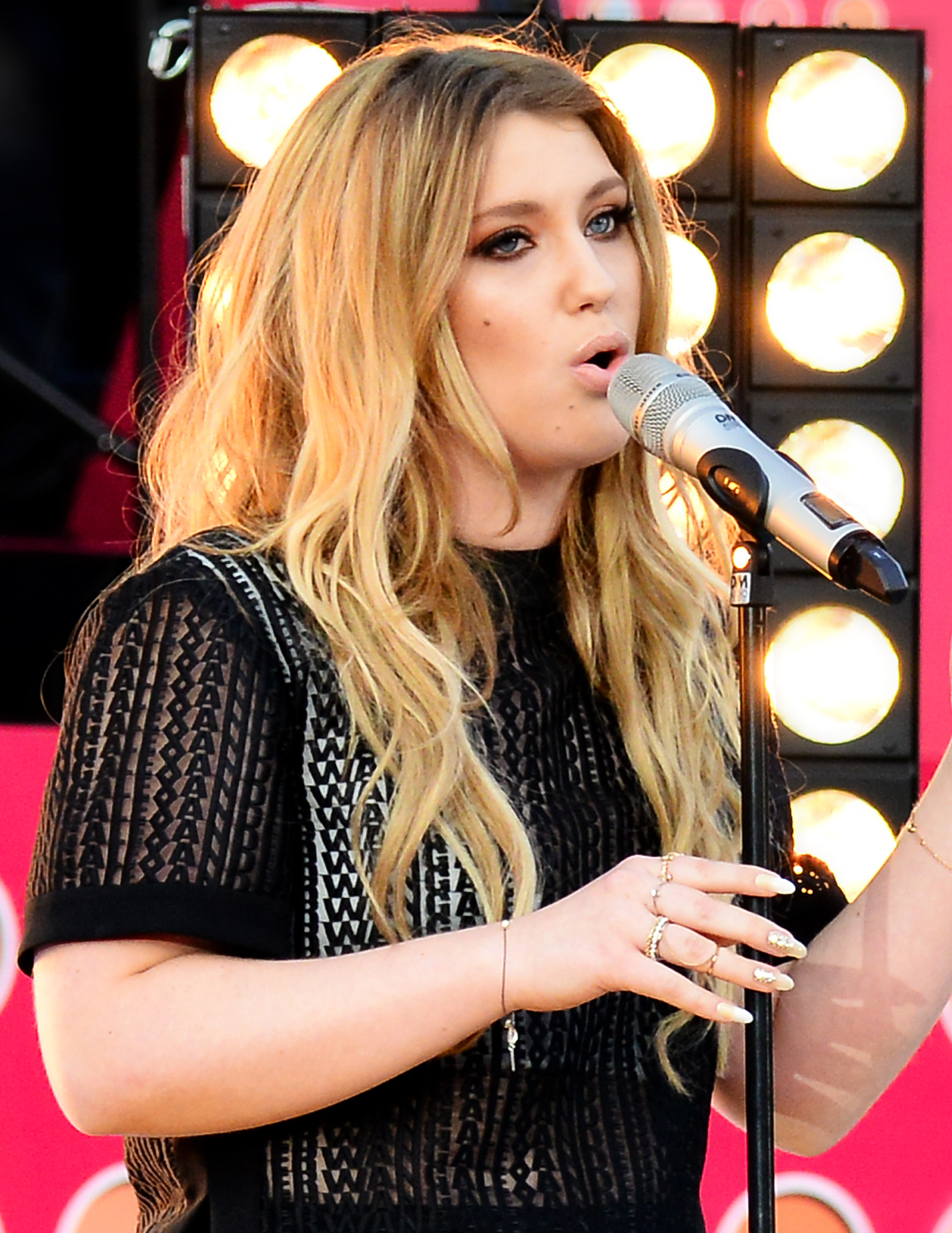
Henderson (co-wrote "This is Real" and sings vocals on the final version)

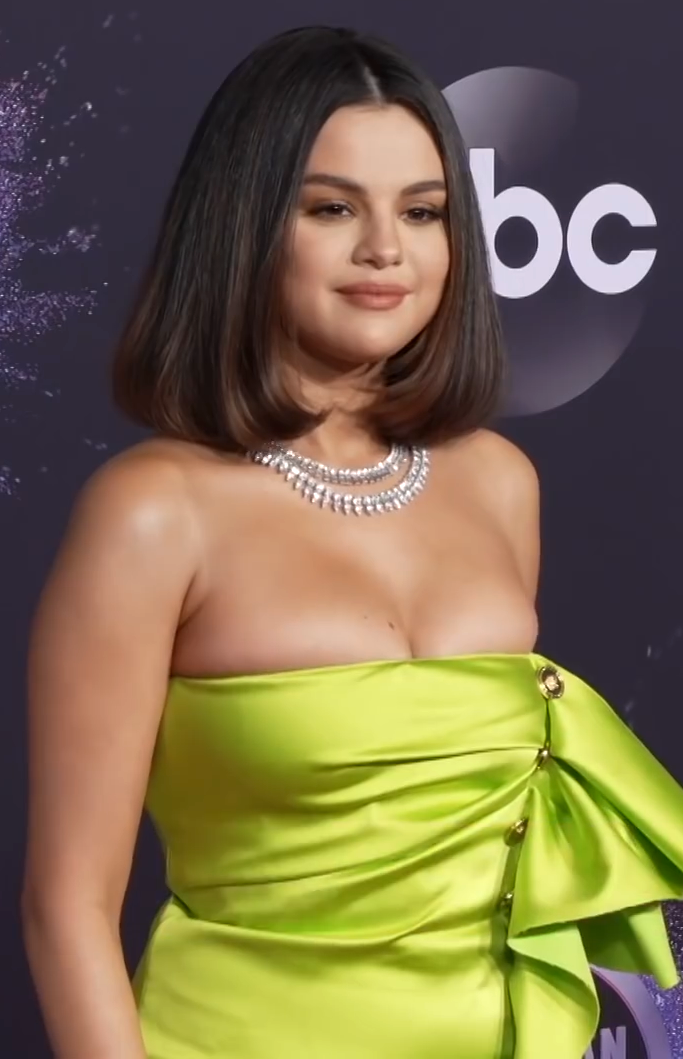
Gomez also recorded a version of the song

== Promotion and release ==
"This is Real" was released along the same time as announcements that Henderson had signed a new record deal with Major Tom Records, a collaborative partnership between UK band Rudimental and Asylum Records. Around the same time, Henderson also released her own EP (extended play), Glorious and appeared on Sigala's single "We Got Love". Polydor Records noted during an interview with Music Week, that they had specifically selected "This is Real" as one of two songs to promote ahead of the release of Jones' album.

Jones and Henderson performed "This is Real" a number of times together, including at Capital FM's Jingle Bell Ball on Saturday 7 December 2019. Capital FM noted that Jones brought the largest number of guests and guest vocalists in the history of the ball. The duo also performed on Ant and Dec's Saturday Night Takeaway on 7 March 2020.

== Critical reception ==
Huw Baines in writing a review for The Guardian said that "This is Real" and "Play" (with Years & Years) "sound[ed] glorious atop crisp, thudding percussion" were examples of Jones' successful release tactics. Baines said that these collaborations were like "a cogent narrative in order to bounce from set piece to set piece like an action film director out for the next endorphin rush."

== Chart performance ==
Though not an official chart in the United States, media monitoring organisation Mediabase reported that "This is Real" reached number one on their US Dance Radio chart in February. In Henderson's hometown of Grimsby, England, the local news hailed "This is Real" as a "remarkable" comeback for Henderson who previously appeared on the UK charts in 2014 with singles "Ghost" and "Glow" which reached number one and number seven respectively.

== Music video ==
Director 'Favourite Colour: Black' from the Park Village production company helmed an official music video themed around the concept of human meets machine. Working with Choreographer Mark Jennings, the company produced a concept whereby "human meets machine is set up with a Jax-branded cheerleader against an artificial robotic opponent which at first feels cold and inhuman, but by the end of the film has been brought to life by the music, establishing an almost human connection between the two." The machine character in the video is "the BOLT high speed cinebot - a motion control arm specially developed for use with the Phantom camera to capture movement in super slow motion."

The video made its premiere on 21 October 2019.

== Track listings and formats ==
Digital single (album version)

1. "This Is Real" (with Ella Henderson) – 3:19

Digital single (Acoustic)

1. "This Is Real" (acoustic) (with Ella Henderson) – 2:49

Digital single (Amazon Original)

1. "This Is Real" (VIP) (with Ella Henderson) – 3:21

Album track download/stream (from the Midnight Snacks (Part 1) EP)

1. "This Is Real" (with Ella Henderson) (Jax Jones Midnight Snack Remix) – 3:39

== Personnel ==
- Jax Jones – producer, primary artist, composer
- Mark Ralph – producer
- Tommy Forest – producer (additional), engineer
- Uzoechi Emenike – composer, additional/background vocals
- Ella Henderson – composer, lead vocals
- Maegan Cottone – composer
- Stuart Hawkes – mastering engineer

== Charts ==
=== Weekly charts ===
Weekly chart performance for "This Is Real"
| Chart (2019–2020) | Peak position |
|---|---|
| Belgium (Ultratip Wallonia) | 7 |
| Belgium Dance (Ultratop Flanders) | 15 |
| Belgium Dance (Ultratop Wallonia) | 15 |
| Czech Republic Airplay (ČNS IFPI) | 7 |
| Euro Digital Song Sales (Billboard) | 8 |
| Ireland (IRMA) | 14 |
| Mexico Airplay (Billboard) | 44 |
| Netherlands (Single Tip) | 26 |
| Scotland Singles (OCC) | 3 |
| UK Singles (OCC) | 9 |
| UK Dance (OCC) | 2 |
| US Hot Dance/Electronic Songs (Billboard) | 25 |

=== Year-end charts ===
Year-end chart performance for "This Is Real"
| Chart (2020) | Position |
|---|---|
| UK Singles (OCC) | 82 |
| US Hot Dance/Electronic Songs (Billboard) | 76 |

== Certifications ==
Certifications for "This Is Real"
| Region | Certification | Certified units/sales |
|---|---|---|
| Brazil (Pro-Música Brasil) | Gold | 20,000^{‡} |
| United Kingdom (BPI) | Platinum | 600,000^{‡} |
^{‡} Sales+streaming figures based on certification alone.

== Release history ==
Release history and formats for "This Is Real"
| Region | Date | Version | Format | Label | Ref. |
|---|---|---|---|---|---|
| Various | 21 October 2019 | Album / original version | Digital download; streaming | Polydor; Universal | – |
| Various | 13 November 2019 | Jax Jones Midnight Snack Remix | Digital download; streaming | Polydor; Universal | |
| Various | 15 November 2019 | Acoustic single | Digital download; streaming | Polydor; Universal | |
| Various | 20 December 2019 | VIP Mix (Amazon Original) | Digital download; streaming | Polydor; Universal | |
