= Lonely Again (Becky Hill song) =

2024 song by Becky Hill

"Lonely Again" is a song written by Becky Hill, Mark Ralph, Sophie Frances Cooke and Jax Jones. It was included on Hill's second studio album Believe Me Now? (2024).

== "Never Be Lonely" ==
"Never Be Lonely"

Single by Jax Jones and Zoe Wees
- Released: 9 February 2024
- Genre: Eurodance
- Length: 2:14
- Label: WUGD
- Songwriters: Becky Hill; Mark Ralph; Sophie Frances Cooke; Timucin Lam; Tom Demac; Ina Wroldsen
- Producers: Jax Jones; Mark Ralph; Tom Demac; 1992

Jax Jones singles chronology
"Forever" (2023)	"Never Be Lonely" (2024)	"Tonight (D.I.Y.A)" (2024)

Zoe Wees singles chronology
"Sorry for the Drama" (2023)	"Never Be Lonely" (2024)	"Mountains" (2024)

Cascada singles chronology
"Never Let Me Go" (2021)	"Never Be Lonely" (2024)	"Ain't No Mountain High Enough" (2024)

Music video
- "Never Be Lonely" on YouTube

In February 2024, "Lonely Again" was released as "Never Be Lonely" by Jax Jones and Zoe Wees in collaboration with Pokémon Company and with additional credits of Tom Demac and Ina Wroldsen. Jones had collaborated with The Pokémon Company on the 2021 release, Pokémon 25: The Album. Jones said "This collaboration with Zoe Wees and Pikachu represents a dream come true for me. 'Never Be Lonely' is a sonic journey into the heart of music and friendship, and it's a privilege to have Pikachu join us on this adventure."

On 8 March 2024, a version featuring Cascada on vocals was released.

=== Reception ===
Jonathan Currinn from Good Star Vibes said "Zoe Wees version wraps the intoxicating beat around her R&B vocals, bringing a whole new dynamic to the UK and German dance scene" and said "The dance track that is empowered more so with Natalie Horler's flawless vocals. Known as the vocalist of Cascada, Natalie Horler has one impressive voice and this song only allows her to emphasise it more so."

=== Track listing ===
No.	Title	Length
1.	"Never Be Lonely"	2:14

Cascada version
No.	Title	Length
1.	"Never Be Lonely" (Cascada remix)	2:06

Donk! version
No.	Title	Length
1.	"Never Be Lonely" (Donk! edit) (with Cascada)	2:15

Arcando version
No.	Title	Length
1.	"Never Be Lonely" (Arcando remix)	2:27

Symmetrik version
No.	Title	Length
1.	"Never Be Lonely" (Symmetrik remix)	3:10

Scooter version
No.	Title	Length
1.	"Never Be Lonely" (Scooter remix)	3:03

=== Charts ===
==== Weekly charts ====
Weekly chart performance
Chart (2024)	Peak position
Belarus Airplay (TopHit)	38
CIS Airplay (TopHit)	45
Estonia Airplay (TopHit)	7
Germany (GfK)	44
Hungary (Editors' Choice Top 40)	36
Ireland (IRMA)	81
Latvia Airplay (TopHit)	3
Lithuania Airplay (TopHit)	45
Poland (Polish Airplay Top 100)	28
Russia Airplay (TopHit)	66
Ukraine Airplay (TopHit)	16
UK Singles (OCC)	41

Weekly chart performance
Chart (2025)	Peak position
CIS Airplay (TopHit)	111
Kazakhstan Airplay (TopHit)	106
Lithuania Airplay (TopHit)	2
Russia Airplay (TopHit)	122
Ukraine Airplay (TopHit)	73

==== Monthly charts ====
Monthly chart performance
Chart (2024)	Peak position
Belarus Airplay (TopHit)	43
CIS Airplay (TopHit)	50
Estonia Airplay (TopHit)	15
Latvia Airplay (TopHit)	2
Lithuania Airplay (TopHit)	59
Russia Airplay (TopHit)	85
Ukraine Airplay (TopHit)	26

Monthly chart performance
Chart (2025)	Peak position
Lithuania Airplay (TopHit)	5
Ukraine Airplay (TopHit)	86

==== Year-end charts ====
Year-end chart performance for "Never Be Lonely"
Chart (2024)	Peak position
Belarus Airplay (TopHit)	112
CIS Airplay (TopHit)	95
Estonia Airplay (TopHit)	52

Year-end chart performance for "Never Be Lonely"
Chart (2025)	Peak position
Lithuania Airplay (TopHit)	76

=== Certifications ===
Certifications for "Never Be Lonely"
Region	Certification	Certified units/sales
Poland (ZPAV)	Platinum	50,000^{‡}
United Kingdom (BPI)	Silver	200,000^{‡}
^{‡} Sales+streaming figures based on certification alone.
