= Radcliffe & Maconie =

UK radio show

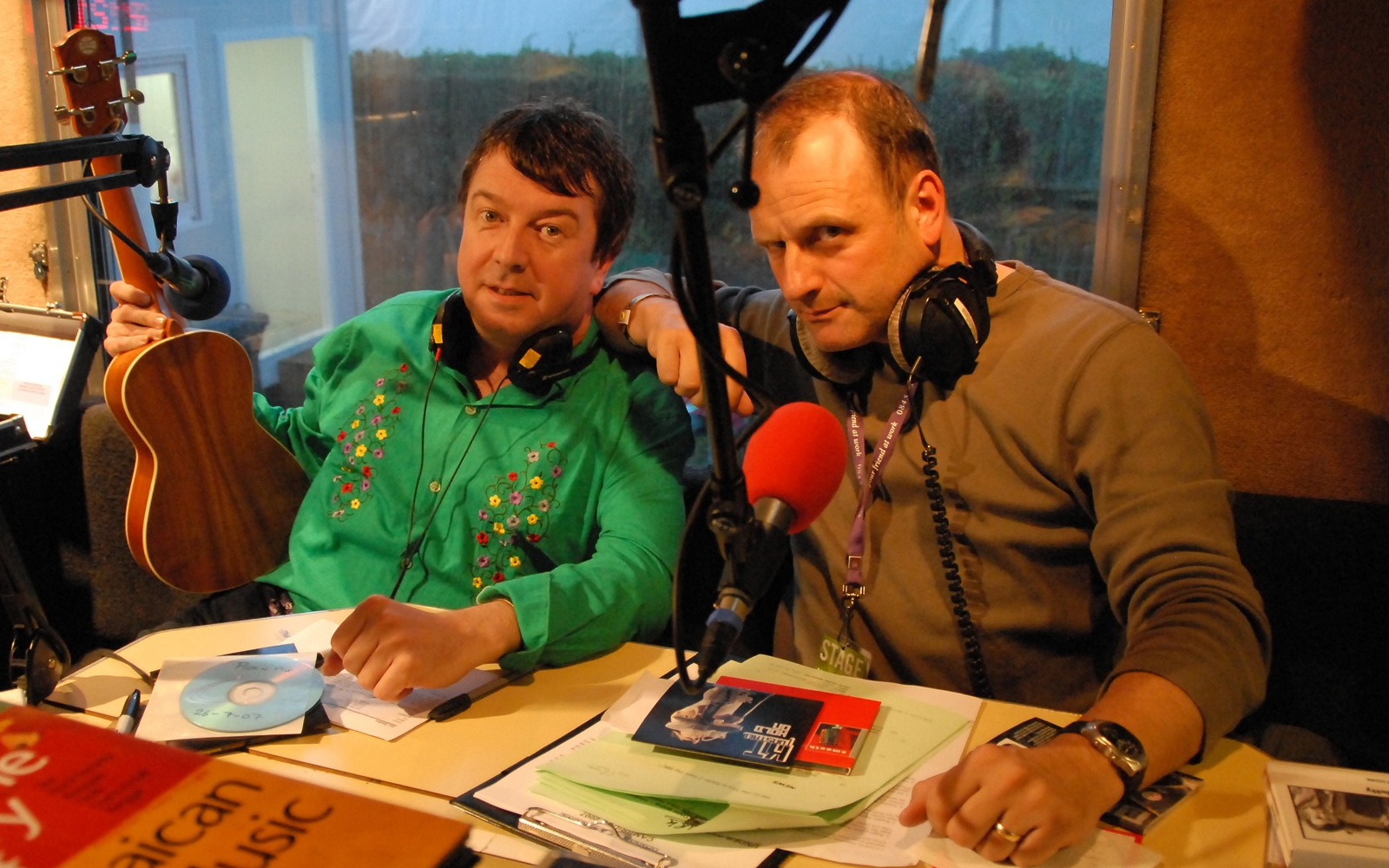
- Maconie (l) & Radcliffe (r) at the Cambridge Folk Festival in 2007
- Other names: The Radcliffe and Maconie Show (2007–2011)
- Genre: Music and conversation
- Running time: 2 hours (Weekends, 8-10 a.m.)
- Country of origin: United Kingdom
- Language: English
- Home station: BBC Radio 2 (2007–2011); BBC Radio 6 Music (2011–present)
- Hosted by: Mark Radcliffe; Stuart Maconie
- Produced by: Lizzie Hoskin; Smooth Operations
- Recording studio: Media City, Salford, Greater Manchester
- Original release: 16 April 2007
- Audio format: Digital radio, TV and internet
- Website: Radcliffe and Maconie

Radcliffe & Maconie is a British radio programme presented by Mark Radcliffe and Stuart Maconie, and broadcast on BBC Radio 6 Music on weekend mornings from 8-10 a.m. The show originally ran on BBC Radio 2 from 16 April 2007 until 23 March 2011, where it was known as The Radcliffe and Maconie Show. Originally broadcast on weekday afternoons, the current 6 Music show broadcasts from the BBC's MediaCityUK in Salford, Greater Manchester. The duo celebrated the 10th anniversary of the show and broadcasting together on 17 April 2017. The show moved to the weekend breakfast slot in January 2019.

== History ==
Mark Radcliffe had previously broadcast a solo show on Radio 2 from June 2004 after transferring from BBC Radio 1 the previous March, whilst Maconie had also broadcast various shows for the network as well as 6 Music.

The Radio 2 show was broadcast four nights a week (Monday to Thursday) until 8 April 2010, when the Thursday night show was given over to In Concert, a music programme featuring repeats of old live concerts. This was carried out as a response to the BBC Trust, which dictated that Radio 2 must feature more live music. Radio 2 controller Bob Shennan made the decision to cut one of Radcliffe & Maconie's shows in order to make way for the repeats featured within 'In Concert'.

On 1 February 2011, it was announced that the pair were to move to BBC Radio 6 Music to present a weekday show, starting on 4 April. The final show on Radio 2 was broadcast on 23 March and featured live music from Manic Street Preachers. The BBC Radio 6 Music weekday show ran from 4 April 2011 until 21 December 2018. Radcliffe took a break from broadcasting in early October 2018 after he had announced he was receiving treatment for cancer. The final weekday show was presented by Maconie only, although Radcliffe made a short appearance announcing that he would be returning in February 2019 to re-join Maconie on the new weekend breakfast show, which began on 12 January.

The show plays both new music by up-and-coming artists and material from established acts. It previously featured live sessions from a diverse collection of acts. Bands and artists who have featured in session include The Raveonettes, Arcade Fire, Crowded House, Sheryl Crow, Supergrass, Elbow, Seasick Steve, Siouxsie Sioux, The Flies, Vashti Bunyan, Kate Walsh, Ed Harcourt, The Earlies, Maps, Laura Veirs, Feist, Editors, Travis, Cherry Ghost, The Coral, The Thrills, Tinariwen and many more.

Radcliffe and Maconie have commented on the show from time to time of their appreciation of cowbells and various kinds of cheese. Whenever Radcliffe is presenting the show, either with Maconie or by himself, it usually begins with the line "You know what you wanna do with that, right? You wanna put a bangin' donk on it." sampled from the song "Put A Donk On It" by The Blackout Crew. If Maconie is presenting solo, he usually does not include this in the show. The show typically begins with an older, classic "bangin' donk" tune, followed by a short instrumental, novelty or television theme song (such as the theme to Barnaby or "Popcorn" by Hot Butter), followed by a contemporary song.

Another sample played regularly on the show is the "Roots Bloody Roots" clip. Taken from listener and contributor Gayton Peawell from Darlington. His suggestion of "Roots Bloody Roots" by Sepultura was performed with a deepened voice.

Elizabeth Alker was the music news reporter on the show after it moved to 6 Music in 2011 until she left at Christmas 2018.

== Current features ==
=== The Chain ===
The Chain is an item on the show billed as a 'never-ending list of records, with every new track somehow connected to the previous one.' A listener-selected song is played in each show after 9:00 am that relates to the one played in The Chain in the previous show; the listener being contacted live on air to explain the association. Other listeners are then encouraged to make contact with another song that links to this one. The connection can be anything, ranging from the very obvious to the very obscure. The item was initially introduced by Gordon Burns but is now introduced by Jason of the Sleaford Mods. On 4 January 2011, Burns joined the show to celebrate the 2,000th link, which was "Fame" by David Bowie. He joined the show again on 9 October 2013 for the 4,000th link, "Dear Prudence" by the Beatles, the date coincidentally being John Lennon's birthday. A website is available for listeners to check if a chain suggestion they want to make has been on before as each song can only be used once. The website is run and maintained by regular contributor to the show Kenneth 'Ken' Yau. As of the beginning of 2025, there have been more than 8,600 links in the chain. The theme song for the segment is the Fleetwood Mac song after which it is named, which was also the very first link.

=== Tea Time Theme Time ===
Every Sunday at about 9:35am, three records are played that have something in common. When the show was on weekdays it would be every day at about 3:35pm. The first week's connections were chosen by the presenters themselves, after which they were picked by listeners. At first the link was announced before the records were played; however, it soon became popular for listeners to guess what the link was, so now the connection isn't mentioned until all the records have been played and listeners contact the show with their guesses as to what it is. Although there is no prize for getting the connection right, the first person to contact the show with the correct answer has the honour of having their name mentioned as the winner. Radcliffe and Maconie used to say that the first correct answer received the "Tea Time Theme Time Crown of Joy." Although the winner didn't receive an actual crown, a picture of a paper hat representing a crown would be tweeted along with the winners name. However, they no longer refer to the "Tea Time Theme Time Crown of Joy."

=== First, Last and Everything ===
This item is where Radcliffe & Maconie together or one of them separately interview a personality who gives their "First, Last and Everything" musical selections. The "First" is a song that was one of the first musical influences on them, e.g. first record they purchased, etc. The "Last" choice is one they have recently discovered. Their "Everything" selection is some piece of music that is overarchingly significant to them. The theme song for this mini-interview item is "You're the First, the Last, My Everything" by Barry White.

=== Crisps on the radio ===
In this feature the hosts attempt to identify the flavour of crisps in a blind tasting. Crisps and similar snacks are sent in to the programme by listeners from around the world. The feature is introduced by the song "On the Radio" by Donna Summer, with the shouted word "crisps" inserted before the key phrase sung by the artist.

=== Breakfast blend ===
Three consecutive tracks that make "a great sonic blend".

=== The Archive ===
A song from a previous BBC session. The feature is based on the premise of the archive being an actual, physical archive deep in the basements of the BBC building. Stuart Maconie usually suggests to Mark Radcliffe that he is probably wondering why Maconie is covered in dust, cobwebs and other detritus, to which Radcliffe asks if he has been down the archive. The degree of dirt and dishevelment generally corresponds with the date of the recording; the older it is, the dirtier Maconie gets, the idea being that it's buried deeper in the archive.

== Previous features ==
=== The Miracle of Pick 'n' Mix ===
Every day on the Radio 2 show, Radcliffe and Maconie would take it in turns to choose a new track on the Pick 'n' Mix feature, usually by a less well known artist. At the end of the week listeners were encouraged to vote on the Radio 2 website for their favourite. The track with the most votes would then be played on every show the following week. After an impromptu moment on the show's Hadrian’s Wall tour, the feature was rechristened "The Miracle of Pick 'n' Mix".

=== Walking Outside Broadcasts ===
Between 3 and 10 September 2009, the show was broadcast live from different locations along the Hadrian's Wall trail, as Radcliffe and Maconie walked between the Solway Firth, the BBC studios in Carlisle and Segedunum in Wallsend, Newcastle upon Tyne. In September 2010 Radcliffe and Maconie broadcast from locations along the Jurassic Coast including Exmouth, Weymouth, Lyme Regis and Sidmouth. They now, occasionally, refer to themselves as "The Beery Hikers", a play on The Hairy Bikers.

=== The Fleetwood Mac Game ===
The winner of the Fleetwood Mac game was typically announced during the first hour of the show. The myriad intricate rules have not been repeated in full since its inception in September 2014. On 16 October 2014 this was won by the music news presenter, SJ, marking the first time the winner had been related to the show or 6 Music.

=== Sampled Under Foot ===
This feature presents two songs in a row, the second drawing in some way from the first, as in a sample. The name of this item was a take-off of the Led Zeppelin song "Trampled Under Foot".

=== Sunday Glove Song ===
On Sunday mornings, a song was played from listeners' submissions that used the word "glove" in its lyrics. Sometimes a klaxon sound was played before the word "glove" was sung. The item was a parody of Steve Wright's "Sunday Love Songs." On Sunday 14 February 2021 (Valentine's Day), the Radcliffe and Maconie programme was composed entirely of Sunday Glove Songs. The theme song for this item was the Wings song "Silly Love Songs" with the presenters covering the word "Love" with "Glove".
