= Blackout Crew =

UK musical group

- Origin: Halliwell, Bolton, Greater Manchester
- Genres: donk; rap
- Years active: 2007–present
- Label: All Around the World Productions/Universal Music TV
- Members: Anthony Sabanskis (Producer); Jordan Cover (MC Cover); Kevin Allison (MC Dowie); Kurtis Chadwick (MC Viper); Luke Purcell (MC Lukey P)

The Blackout Crew are a donk/rap group from Halliwell, Bolton, Greater Manchester. Their 2009 album Time 2 Shine peaked at No. 42 in the UK. Their album contained three singles: "Bbbounce", "Put a Donk on It" and "Dialled". The Blackout Crew worked with electronic group Metronomy to provide a B-side remix for their 2008 single "A Thing for Me". In 2023, Jax Jones released the single "Won't Forget You" with D.O.D. and Ina Wroldsen, which was shortly followed by a "Donk Edit" featuring Kurtis Chadwick (MC Viper), Jordan Cover (MC Cover) and Luke Purcell (MC Lukey P) from the newly reformed Blackout Crew, which peaked at number 28 on 16 November 2023 in the UK, far surpassing the original edit's peak of number 82 on 9 November 2023.

== Members ==
- Anthony "Tony" Sabanskis (producer)
- Jordan Cover (MC Cover)
- Kevin Allison (MC Dowie)
- Kurtis Chadwick (MC Viper)
- Luke Purcell (MC Lukey P)
- Rob Davis (MC Rapid)
- Zak Kabbani (MC Zak K)
