= Thing for You =

Single by David Guetta and Martin Solveig
- Released: 12 July 2019
- Genre: Deep house
- Length: 3:11
- Label: FFRR
- Songwriter(s): Pierre Guetta; Martin Picandet; Alexandra Yatchenko; Jonnali Parmenius; Alex Hope
- Producer(s): David Guetta; Martin Solveig

David Guetta singles chronology
"Instagram" (2019)	"Thing for You" (2019)	"Never Be Alone" (2019)

Martin Solveig singles chronology
"All Day and Night" (2019)	"Thing for You" (2019)	"Juliet & Romeo" (2019)

"Thing for You" is a song by French DJs David Guetta and Martin Solveig. It was released as a single on 12 July 2019 by What a Music. The song was written by David Guetta, Noonie Bao, Alex Hope, Martin Picandet and Sasha Sloan, who is also the vocalist on this track.

== Background ==
Guetta and Solveig have been close friends for several years. In June 2019, while working together in the studio in Ibiza, they teased of a collaboration via Solveig's Instagram account.

== Track listing ==
Digital download
No.	Title	Length
1.	"Thing for You"	3:11

Digital download
No.	Title	Length
1.	"Thing for You" (Club Mix)	7:32

== Charts ==
Chart (2019)	Peak position
Belgium (Ultratip Bubbling Under Flanders)	10
Lithuania (AGATA)	48
Netherlands (Tipparade)	5
New Zealand Hot Singles (RMNZ)	18
Scotland (OCC)	41
Slovakia (Singles Digitál Top 100)	99
UK Singles (OCC)	89
Ukraine Airplay (TopHit)	70
US Hot Dance/Electronic Songs (Billboard)	19
