= Juliet & Romeo =

2019 single by Martin Solveig featuring Roy Woods

Single by Martin Solveig and Roy Woods
- Released: 6 December 2019
- Genre: French house, nu-disco
- Length: 3:24
- Label: Virgin EMI Records
- Songwriter(s): Martin Solveig; Peter Wade Keusch; Julien Jabre; Rune Reilly Kölsch; Amanda MNDR Warner
- Producer(s): Martin Solveig

Martin Solveig singles chronology
| "Thing for You" (2019) | "Juliet & Romeo" (2019) | "Tequila" (2020) |

Roy Woods singles chronology
| "Bubbly" (2019) | "Juliet & Romeo" (2019) | "Shot Again" (2020) |

"Juliet & Romeo" is a song by French DJ Martin Solveig and Canadian singer-songwriter Roy Woods, released as a single on 6 December 2019 by Virgin EMI Records. The song was written by Martin Solveig, Peter Wade Keusch, Julien Jabre, Rune Reilly Kölsch and Amanda MNDR Warner.

== Background ==
Talking about the song on his YouTube account, Solveig said, "I’m so thrilled to present you ‘Juliet & Romeo’ both the track and the music video. It's a song that is very special to me, almost like a reminiscence from last summer in Ibiza. Having the talented Roy Woods singing on this one adds a new dimension to it!"

== Reception ==
Katie Bain of Billboard said, "Shakespeare's teenage lovers may have been doomed, but the French producer and smooth Canadian singer's disco house beat is nothing but funky and upbeat. It's built around a plucky piano sample from Kölsch's “Der Alte,” who remixed Solveig's “My Love” in 2018. For this take, Solveig bumps the pulsing keys with a driving club rhythm and funkalicious vocal chop hook. Woods brings infectious with a playful chorus and layered harmonies. This is one for the dance floor, for sure."

== Music video ==
A music video to accompany the release of "Juliet & Romeo" was first released on YouTube on 6 December 2019. The music video was directed by NDA Paris & Nathanael Day .

== Track listing ==
Digital download and stream
| No. | Title | Length |
|---|---|---|
| 1. | "Juliet & Romeo" | 3:24 |

Digital download – Remixes
| No. | Title | Length |
|---|---|---|
| 1. | "Juliet & Romeo" (feat. Roy Woods) (Joy Club Remix) | 3:01 |
| 2. | "Juliet & Romeo" (feat. Roy Woods) (Hannah Wants Remix) | 5:35 |
| 3. | "Juliet & Romeo" (feat. Roy Woods) (Star.One Remix) | 3:11 |
| 4. | "Juliet & Romeo" (feat. Roy Woods) (Fabio Neural Dancefloor Remix) | 3:24 |
| 5. | "Juliet & Romeo" (feat. Roy Woods) (Fabio Neural Underground Remix) | 4:30 |
| 6. | "Juliet & Romeo" (feat. Roy Woods) (Mokoa Remix) | 4:59 |

== Charts ==
| Chart (2019–2020) | Peak position |
|---|---|
| Belgium (Ultratip Bubbling Under Flanders) | 19 |
| Belgium (Ultratip Bubbling Under Wallonia) | 1 |
| UK Singles (OCC) | 51 |
| US Hot Dance/Electronic Songs (Billboard) | 36 |

== Certifications ==
| Region | Certification | Certified units/sales |
|---|---|---|
| United Kingdom (BPI) | Gold | 400,000^{‡} |
^{‡} Sales+streaming figures based on certification alone.
