= We Got Love (Sigala song) =

Single by Sigala featuring Ella Henderson

from the album Everything I Didn't Say and More and The Collection
- Released: 1 November 2019
- Genre: Tropical house
- Length: 3:33
- Label: Ministry of Sound; B1; Arista
- Songwriters: Bruce Fielder; Joakim Jarl; Thomas Jules; Anne-Marie Nicholson; Derrick May; Michael James; Nicholas Gale; Gabriella Henderson; Janee Bennett
- Producers: Sigala; Jarly

Sigala singles chronology
"Wish You Well" (2019)	"We Got Love" (2019)	"Heaven on My Mind" (2020)

Ella Henderson singles chronology
"This Is Real" (2019)	"We Got Love" (2019)	"Friends" (2019)

"We Got Love" is a song by English DJ Sigala, featuring vocals from British singer and songwriter Ella Henderson and uncredited backing vocals from English singer and songwriter Anne-Marie. The song was released as a digital download on 1 November 2019. The song peaked at number 42 on the UK Singles Chart.

== Background ==
In an interview with Hits Radio, Sigala admitted he "always loved Ella's voice and vibe, she's a very likeable person." Henderson then said, "I'm a huge fan of your music, and I think as soon as I was sent the track and I heard it, it just made me feel super positive and I couldn't wait to vocal it, and be a part of it!"

The song incorporates a sample from the Rhythim Is Rhythim song "Strings of Life", whose songwriter (Michael James) and producer (Derrick May) are given writer credits.

== Charts ==
=== Weekly charts ===
Weekly chart performance for "We Got Love"
Chart (2019–2020)	Peak position
Hungary (Rádiós Top 40)	20
Ireland (IRMA)	52
New Zealand Hot Singles (RMNZ)	32
Poland Airplay (ZPAV)	35
Scotland Singles (OCC)	17
UK Dance (OCC)	6
UK Singles (OCC)	42
US Hot Dance/Electronic Songs (Billboard)	29

=== Year-end charts ===
Year-end chart performance for "We Got Love"
Chart (2020)	Position
Hungary (Rádiós Top 40)	78

== Certifications ==
Certifications for "We Got Love"
Region	Certification	Certified units/sales
United Kingdom (BPI)	Gold	400,000^{‡}
^{‡} Sales+streaming figures based on certification alone.

== Release history ==
Release history and formats for "We Got Love"
Region	Date	Format	Label
United Kingdom	1 November 2019	Digital download; streaming	Ministry of Sound; B1
