= Harder (Jax Jones and Bebe Rexha song) =

Single by Jax Jones and Bebe Rexha

from the EP Snacks
- Released: 12 July 2019
- Genre: Dance-pop
- Length: 2:39
- Label: Polydor
- Songwriter(s): Timucin Aluo; Camille Purcell; Steve McCutcheon; Bleta Rexha
- Producer(s): Jax Jones; Steve Mac

Jax Jones singles chronology
"One Touch" (2019)	"Harder" (2019)	"Jacques" (2019)

Bebe Rexha singles chronology
"Call You Mine" (2019)	"Harder" (2019)	"You Can't Stop the Girl" (2019)

Music video
- "Harder" on YouTube

"Harder" is a song by English DJ Jax Jones and American singer-songwriter Bebe Rexha, released on 12 July 2019. It is the ninth single from Jones's debut EP Snacks (2018), and was also included on his debut studio album, Snacks (Supersize) (2019). The music video for the song was released on 31 July 2019. The song was released to top 40 radio on 13 August 2019, and spent 14 weeks on the UK Singles Chart.

== Critical reception ==
Jason Lipshutz of Billboard called the song a "dance-pop opus" and a "quick ray of sun" with "whirring beats" that "continues Rexha down a promising path".

== Promotion ==
Jones shared a snippet of the song on 9 July, asking fans who they thought was singing on it. He revealed the collaboration in another post on 10 July.

== Music video ==
The music video for the song was released on 31 July and was directed by Sophie Muller. The video features Bebe Rexha on the day of her wedding and her fighting with her husband-to be and glancing at the wedding singer (Jax Jones).

== Track listing ==
Digital download and streaming
No.	Title	Length
1.	"Harder"	2:39

Digital download and streaming – KC Lights Remix
No.	Title	Length
1.	"Harder" (KC Lights 6AM Remix)	3:24
2.	"Harder" (KC Lights Remix)	3:54

== Charts ==
=== Weekly charts ===
Chart (2019)	Peak position
Belgium (Ultratip Bubbling Under Flanders)	39
Belgium (Ultratip Bubbling Under Wallonia)	10
China Airplay/FL (Billboard)	15
Croatia (HRT)	16
Czech Republic (Rádio – Top 100)	11
France Downloads (SNEP)	81
Iceland (Tónlistinn)	39
Ireland (IRMA)	24
Lithuania (AGATA)	65
New Zealand Hot Singles (RMNZ)	31
Poland (Polish Airplay Top 100)	2
Scotland (OCC)	12
Slovakia (Rádio Top 100)	47
Slovenia (SloTop50)	43
Sweden (Sverigetopplistan)	64
UK Singles (OCC)	23
US Hot Dance/Electronic Songs (Billboard)	28

=== Year-end charts ===
Chart (2019)	Position
Poland (ZPAV)	25
US Hot Dance/Electronic Songs (Billboard)	83

== Certifications ==
Region	Certification	Certified units/sales
Australia (ARIA)	Gold	35,000^{‡}
Brazil (Pro-Música Brasil)	Gold	20,000^{‡}
New Zealand (RMNZ)	Gold	15,000^{‡}
Poland (ZPAV)	Platinum	50,000^{‡}
United Kingdom (BPI)	Gold	400,000^{‡}
^{‡} Sales+streaming figures based on certification alone.

== Release history ==
Country	Date	Format	Version	Label	Ref.
Various	12 July 2019	Digital download; streaming	Original	Polydor	
Various	31 July 2019	Digital download; streaming	KC Lights Remix EP	Polydor	
United States	13 August 2019	Top 40 radio	Original	Interscope	
