= One Touch (Jess Glynne and Jax Jones song) =

2019 house single by Jess Glynne and Jax Jones

Single by Jess Glynne and Jax Jones

from the album Snacks and Always In Between (streaming deluxe edition)
- Released: 24 May 2019
- Genre: House
- Length: 3:17
- Label: Atlantic
- Songwriters: Janee Bennett; Jax Jones; Jess Glynne
- Producers: Jax Jones; Mark Ralph

Jess Glynne singles chronology
"No One" (2019)	"One Touch" (2019)	"Lie for You" (2020)

Jax Jones singles chronology
"All Day and Night" (2019)	"One Touch" (2019)	"Harder" (2019)

Music video
- "One Touch" on YouTube

"One Touch" is a song by English singer Jess Glynne and English DJ and record producer Jax Jones. The collaboration was released as a standalone single on 24 May 2019 through Atlantic Records. The song was added to Jones' debut EP Snacks, appearing on later editions, and was also included as a bonus track on Glynne's second studio album Always In Between (2018) on streaming services. The song was later certified Platinum by the BPI in the United Kingdom in September 2024 for selling 600,000 units in the country.

== Promotion ==
Glynne confirmed the collaboration in a video posted to Twitter, where she sang part of the song ("Will you catch me when I'm weightless / Pull me close before the crazy come"), tagging Jones and captioning it "#OneTouch". Jones jokingly responded that he was "putting something together", and soon after posted a video of himself playing part of the song on a keyboard along with a link to pre-save the song.

== Music video ==
The accompanying video promotes the fostering of children in care. It features a story about a teenage girl and a younger boy who enter a care home at the same time, and look out for each other. Towards the end of the video, the boy and girl meet their foster parents, Jones and Glynne respectively, before they are fostered.

== Charts ==
Chart (2019)	Peak position
Belgium (Ultratip Bubbling Under Flanders)	38
Belgium (Ultratip Bubbling Under Wallonia)	29
Hungary (Single Top 40)	9
Ireland (IRMA)	28
New Zealand Hot Singles (RMNZ)	18
Sweden Heatseeker (Sverigetopplistan)	6
Scotland Singles (OCC)	8
Slovakia Airplay (ČNS IFPI)	43
Switzerland (Schweizer Hitparade)	88
UK Singles (OCC)	19
US Hot Dance/Electronic Songs (Billboard)	15

== Certifications ==
Region	Certification	Certified units/sales
New Zealand (RMNZ)	Gold	15,000^{‡}
United Kingdom (BPI)	Platinum	600,000^{‡}
^{‡} Sales+streaming figures based on certification alone.
