= I Miss U =

2020 single by Jax Jones and Au/Ra

Single by Jax Jones and Au/Ra
- Released: 9 October 2020
- Genre: Dance-pop
- Length: 2:52
- Label: Polydor; Columbia
- Songwriters: Timucin Aluo; Janee Bennett; Cass Lowe; Ina Wroldsen; Olav Tronsmoen
- Producers: Jax Jones; Lowe (co.); Mark Ralph (co.); Alex Tepper (co.); Tom Demac (add.)

Jax Jones singles chronology
"Tequila" (2020)	"I Miss U" (2020)	"Feels" (2021)

Au/Ra singles chronology
"Ideas" (2020)	"I Miss U" (2020)	"Moon River" (2020)

Music video
- "I Miss U" on YouTube

"I Miss U" (stylised in all lowercase) is a song by English DJ and record producer Jax Jones and German singer-songwriter Au/Ra. It was released on 9 October 2020 by Polydor Records. The song peaked at number twenty-five on the UK Singles Chart. It was written by Cass Lowe, Ina Wroldsen, Janée Bennett, Olav Tronsmoen and Timucin Lam.

== Background ==
Tweeting about the meaning behind the song, Jones said, "i miss u is finally out in the world we all miss something right now and i miss u is supposed to highlight that and remind ourselves that it's ok to feel this way sometimes. "

== Music video ==
A music video to accompany the release of "I Miss U" was first released onto YouTube on 9 October 2020.

== Personnel ==
Credits adapted from Tidal.

- Alex Tepper – producer, associated performer, co-producer, drum programming
- Cass Lowe – producer, composer, lyricist, associated performer, co-producer, programming
- Jax Jones – producer, associated performer, music production, programming
- Mark Ralph – producer, associated performer, co-producer, mixer, programming, studio personnel, vocal producer
- Tom Demac – producer, additional producer, associated performer, drum programming
- Ina Wroldsen – composer, lyricist
- Janée Bennett – composer, lyricist
- Olav Tronsmoen – composer, lyricist
- Timucin Lam – composer, lyricist
- Au/Ra – associated performer, vocals
- Andrew Frampton - vocal production
- Big-z – associated performer, drum programming
- Matthew Styles – mastering engineer, studio personnel
- Torsten Stenzel – studio personnel, vocal engineer

== Charts ==
=== Weekly charts ===
Weekly chart performance for "I Miss U"
Chart (2020–2021)	Peak position
Australia (ARIA)	64
Belgium (Ultratip Bubbling Under Flanders)	38
Belgium (Ultratip Bubbling Under Wallonia)	23
Czech Republic Airplay (ČNS IFPI)	20
Germany (GfK)	88
Hungary (Rádiós Top 40)	1
Hungary (Single Top 40)	25
Ireland (IRMA)	32
Romania (Airplay 100)	85
Scotland Singles (OCC)	17
Slovakia Airplay (ČNS IFPI)	79
UK Singles (OCC)	25
UK Dance (OCC)	7
US Hot Dance/Electronic Songs (Billboard)	13

=== Year-end charts ===
Year-end chart performance for "I Miss U"
Chart (2021)	Position
Hungary (Rádiós Top 40)	13
US Hot Dance/Electronic Songs (Billboard)	80

== Certifications ==
Region	Certification	Certified units/sales
Australia (ARIA)	Platinum	70,000^{‡}
Brazil (Pro-Música Brasil)	Platinum	40,000^{‡}
Poland (ZPAV)	Gold	25,000^{‡}
United Kingdom (BPI)	Silver	200,000^{‡}
^{‡} Sales+streaming figures based on certification alone.
