= Snacks (EP) =

EP by Jax Jones
- Released: 28 November 2018
- Recorded: 2016–2018
- Studio: The Fish, Bemus Point
- Genre: House; deep house; tropical house
- Length: 27:48
- Label: Universal
- Producer: Jax Jones; Mark Ralph

Jax Jones chronology
Snacks (2018)	Snacks (Supersize) (2019)

Singles from Snacks
- 1. "House Work" Released: 1 July 2016; 2. "You Don't Know Me" Released: 9 December 2016; 3. "Instruction" Released: 16 June 2017; 4. "Breathe" Released: 1 December 2017; 5. "Ring Ring" Released: 22 June 2018; 6. "Play" Released: 28 November 2018; 7. "All Day and Night" Released: 28 March 2019; 8. "One Touch" Released: 24 May 2019; 9. "Harder" Released: 12 July 2019

Snacks is the debut extended play of British musician and DJ Jax Jones. It was released on 28 November 2018 through Universal Music Group, which is the same day the single "Play" was released. The EP contains all of Jax Jones' previously released singles starting from "House Work". It was later re-released in July 2019 with "All Day and Night", "One Touch" and "Harder". The EP was later expanded into Jones' first full-length album Snacks (Supersize), which was released on 6 September 2019.

== Track listing ==
Snacks EP track listing
No.	Title	Writer(s)	Producer(s)	Length
1.	"Harder" (^{[c]} with Bebe Rexha)	Timucin Lam; Camille Purcell; Steve Mac; Bebe Rexha	Jones; Mac	2:39
2.	"Play" (with Years & Years)	Timucin Lam; Emenike; Oliver Thornton; Mark Ralph	Jax Jones; Ralph^{[a]}	3:06
3.	"Breathe" (featuring Ina Wroldsen)	Lam; Emenike; Fred Gibson; Ina Wroldsen; William Clarke	Jones; Ralph^{[b]}	3:27
4.	"You Don't Know Me" (featuring Raye)	Lam; Emenike; Rachel Keen; Janée Bennett; Walter Merziger; Arno Kammermeier; Peter Hayo; Patrick Bodmer; Philip D. Young	Jones; Ralph^{[b]}	3:31
5.	"House Work" (featuring Mike Dunn and MNEK)	Lam; Emenike	Jones	2:37
6.	"Ring Ring" (with Mabel featuring Rich the Kid)	Lam; Emenike; Ralph; Purcel; Mabel McVey; Marlon McVey-Roudette	Jones; Ralph	3:37
7.	"Instruction" (featuring Demi Lovato and Stefflon Don)	Lam; Emenike; Demetria Lovato; Stephanie Allen	Jones; Ralph^{[b]}	2:45
8.	"All Day and Night" (^{[c]} with Martin Solveig and Madison Beer)	Lam; Martin Picandet; Rebecca Hill; Hailee Steinfeld; Purcell; Bennett; Mark Ralph	Jones; Martin Solveig; Ralph^{[a]}	2:49
9.	"One Touch" (^{[c]} with Jess Glynne)	Lam; Jess Glynne; Bennett	Jones; Ralph	3:17
Total length:				27:48

Notes

- ^{^[a]} signifies a co-producer.
- ^{^[b]} signifies an additional producer.
- ^{^[c]} track was not included on original release.

Sample credits

- "You Don't Know Me" contains samples from "Body Language", written by Walter Merziger, Arno Kammermier, Patrick Bodmer and Phillip D. Young, as performed by M.A.N.D.Y. & Booka Shade.

== Charts ==
=== Weekly charts ===
Weekly chart performance for Snacks
Chart (2018–2020)	Peak position
Belgian Albums (Ultratop Flanders)	38
Belgian Albums (Ultratop Wallonia)	157
Dutch Albums (Album Top 100)	42
Finnish Albums (Suomen virallinen lista)	33
Irish Albums (IRMA)	10
Latvian Albums (LAIPA)	19
Lithuanian Albums (AGATA)	5
Norwegian Albums (VG-lista)	17
Scottish Albums (OCC)	28
UK Albums (OCC)	9
UK Dance Albums (OCC)	1

=== Year-end charts ===
2019 year-end chart performance for Snacks
Chart (2019)	Position
Irish Albums (IRMA)	31
UK Albums (OCC)	34

2020 year-end chart performance for Snacks
Chart (2020)	Position
Belgian Albums (Ultratop Flanders)	108
Irish Albums (IRMA)	28
UK Albums (OCC)	36

== Certifications ==
Certifications for Snacks
Region	Certification	Certified units/sales
Canada (Music Canada)	Gold	40,000^{‡}
Denmark (IFPI Danmark)	Gold	10,000^{‡}
New Zealand (RMNZ)	Gold	7,500^{‡}
Poland (ZPAV)	Platinum	20,000^{‡}
United Kingdom (BPI)	Platinum	300,000^{‡}
^{‡} Sales+streaming figures based on certification alone.
