= House Work (novel) =

1994 novel by Kristina McGrath

- First edition
- Author: Kristina McGrath
- Language: English
- Genre: Novel, Proletarian literature
- Publisher: Bridge Works Publishing Company
- Publication date: 1994
- Publication place: United States
- Media type: Print (hardback)
- Pages: 198 pp
- ISBN: 1-882593-07-3
- OCLC: 30075637
- Dewey Decimal: 813/.54 20
- LC Class: PS3563.C3659 H68 1994

House Work is a novel by the American writer Kristina McGrath set in 1950s Pittsburgh, Pennsylvania.

It tells the story of a working-class family of five through shifting points of view. The novel's focus is on a mother's heroism in raising her three children alone after the disintegration of her marriage. Defying the advice of her parish priest, Anna Hallissey leaves her alcoholic husband and re-establishes a home for her children by cleaning other people's houses.

The novel was chosen by The New York Times Book Review as a notable book of the year in 1994.
