= Play (Jax Jones and Years & Years song) =

Single by Jax Jones and Years & Years

from the EP Snacks
- Released: 28 November 2018
- Genre: Deep house
- Length: 3:06
- Label: Polydor
- Songwriters: Timucin Aluo; Olly Alexander; Mark Ralph; Uzoechi Emenike
- Producers: Jax Jones; Mark Ralph

Jax Jones singles chronology
"Ring Ring" (2018)	"Play" (2018)	"All Day and Night" (2019)

Years & Years singles chronology
"All for You" (2018)	"Play" (2018)	"Valentino" (2019)

Music video
- "Play" on YouTube

"Play" is a song by English DJ Jax Jones and English band Years & Years, released as a single on 28 November 2018. It was included on Jones' Snacks EP. Sung by Olly Alexander, it is Jones' first track to feature male lead vocals since 2016's "House Work". The song is also included in the track listing of Years & Years' second studio album Palo Santo, rereleased the same day as the single.

== Music video ==
The music video for the song depicts Jax Jones and Olly Alexander at a superstore, wherein they dance around on a conveyor belt while dodging food items. There are also fairly brief scenes of Jax as a cashier in the same store at the beginning and end of the video.

== Background ==
Jones stated that he wanted to work with Olly Alexander of Years & Years because of his "unique voice", later saying "it was great to collaborate with someone so down to earth and open to new ideas." On working together, Alexander said the pair "giggled the whole time and danced around. I wrote loads of ideas and then we picked the ones we liked and made the song out of it."

== Critical reception ==
Gay Times writer Daniel Megarry called the chorus "infectious" and labelled its sound UK garage, soul and house.

== Cover art ==
The Vodafone Big Top 40 called the cover art a parody of Play-Doh.

== Promotion ==
Jones announced the collaboration on 26 November 2018, revealing the song would be released two days later.

== Charts ==
=== Weekly charts ===
Chart (2018–19)	Peak position
Belgium (Ultratip Bubbling Under Flanders)	13
Belgium (Ultratop 50 Wallonia)	46
Czech Republic Airplay (ČNS IFPI)	48
Hungary (Rádiós Top 40)	18
Hungary (Single Top 40)	35
Ireland (IRMA)	19
New Zealand Hot Singles (RMNZ)	22
Poland Airplay (ZPAV)	26
Romania (Airplay 100)	48
Scottish Singles Sales (Official Charts)	9
Slovakia Airplay (ČNS IFPI)	50
UK Singles (Official Charts)	8
UK Dance (Official Charts)	1
US Hot Dance/Electronic Songs (Billboard)	34

=== Year-end charts ===
Chart (2019)	Position
Hungary (Rádiós Top 40)	47

== Certifications ==
Region	Certification	Certified units/sales
Brazil (Pro-Música Brasil)	Gold	20,000^{‡}
Poland (ZPAV)	Platinum	20,000^{‡}
United Kingdom (BPI)	Platinum	600,000^{‡}
^{‡} Sales+streaming figures based on certification alone.
