= All Day and Night =

2019 debut single by Europa and Madison Beer

Single by Europa and Madison Beer

from the EP Snacks and Europa
- Released: 28 March 2019
- Length: 2:49
- Label: Polydor
- Songwriters: Timucin Lam; Martin Picandet; Rebecca Hill; Hailee Steinfeld; Camille Purcell; Janée Bennett; Mark Ralph
- Producers: Jax Jones; Martin Solveig; Ralph (co.)

Jax Jones singles chronology
"Play" (2018)	"All Day and Night" (2019)	"One Touch" (2019)

Martin Solveig singles chronology
"My Love" (2018)	"All Day and Night" (2019)	"Thing for You" (2019)

Madison Beer singles chronology
"Hurts Like Hell" (2018)	"All Day and Night" (2019)	"Dear Society" (2019)

Music video
- "All Day and Night" on YouTube

"All Day and Night" is a song by English DJ Jax Jones and French DJ Martin Solveig under their alias Europa, with vocals from American singer Madison Beer. It was released on 28 March 2019 as their first single through Polydor Records and appears on Jones' debut EP Snacks. The song was written by Jones, Solveig, Becky Hill, Hailee Steinfeld, Kamille, Jin Jin, and Mark Ralph. The single became Jones' and Beer's first and Solveig's second number-one on Billboard's Dance/Mix Show Airplay chart in its 6 July 2019 issue.

== Background ==
Europa reached out to Beer to record her vocals, which she accepted after she "loved" the song. Solveig said of the collaboration, "To have Madison on our first track is great. She has an undeniable truth in her vocal that we both really like and since launching her career she’s become an influential voice of her generation."

== Music video ==
The music video for the song was released on April 11, 2019. It features heavily animated scenes intertwined with Madison Beer singing at various locations around a city. A secondary music video, referenced as a "Late Night Session," was released on May 7.

== Promotion ==
Jones began teasing the track through social media in late March, announcing that his "first track" with Solveig would be out that Thursday. Beer performed the song solo in May 2019 during the Beale Street Music Festival.

== Charts ==
=== Weekly charts ===
Chart (2019–2020)	Peak position
Austria (Ö3 Austria Top 40)	60
Belgium (Ultratip Bubbling Under Flanders)	2
Belgium (Ultratop 50 Wallonia)	14
Czech Republic Airplay (ČNS IFPI)	85
France (SNEP)	82
Germany (GfK)	85
Hungary (Dance Top 40)	30
Hungary (Rádiós Top 40)	7
Hungary (Single Top 40)	24
Ireland (IRMA)	7
Lithuania (AGATA)	21
Mexico Airplay (Billboard)	38
Netherlands (Dutch Top 40)	29
Netherlands (Single Top 100)	74
New Zealand Hot Singles (RMNZ)	29
Poland Airplay (ZPAV)	3
Romania (Airplay 100)	19
Russia Airplay (Tophit)	84
Scotland Singles (OCC)	7
Slovakia Airplay (ČNS IFPI)	21
Slovakia Singles Digital (ČNS IFPI)	65
Slovenia (SloTop50)	32
Switzerland (Schweizer Hitparade)	77
UK Singles (OCC)	10
UK Dance (OCC)	2
Ukraine Airplay (TopHit)	41
US Hot Dance/Electronic Songs (Billboard)	14

=== Year-end charts ===
Chart (2019)	Position
Belgium (Ultratop Wallonia)	49
Hungary (Rádiós Top 40)	59
Ireland (IRMA)	41
Poland (ZPAV)	32
Romania (Airplay 100)	77
UK Singles (Official Charts Company)	52
US Hot Dance/Electronic Songs (Billboard)	56

Chart (2020)	Position
Hungary (Dance Top 40)	95
Hungary (Rádiós Top 40)	33

== Certifications ==
Region	Certification	Certified units/sales
Canada (Music Canada)	Gold	40,000^{‡}
Denmark (IFPI Danmark)	Gold	45,000^{‡}
France (SNEP)	Gold	100,000^{‡}
Germany (BVMI)	Gold	200,000^{‡}
Italy (FIMI)	Gold	35,000^{‡}
New Zealand (RMNZ)	Gold	15,000^{‡}
Poland (ZPAV)	3× Platinum	150,000^{‡}
Portugal (AFP)	Gold	5,000^{‡}
United Kingdom (BPI)	Platinum	600,000^{‡}
^{‡} Sales+streaming figures based on certification alone.
