= Instruction (song) =

Single by Jax Jones featuring Demi Lovato and Stefflon Don

from the EP Snacks
- Released: 16 June 2017
- Genre: Dancehall
- Length: 2:45
- Label: Polydor
- Songwriters: Uzoechi Emenike; Stephanie Allen; Demi Lovato; Timucin Aluo
- Producers: Jax Jones; Mark Ralph

Jax Jones singles chronology
| "You Don't Know Me" (2016) | "Instruction" (2017) | "Breathe" (2017) |

Demi Lovato singles chronology
| "No Promises" (2017) | "Instruction" (2017) | "Sorry Not Sorry" (2017) |

Stefflon Don singles chronology
| "Real Ting" (2016) | "Instruction" (2017) | "Ding-a-Ling" (2017) |

Music video
- "Instruction" on YouTube

"Instruction" is a song by English DJ and record producer Jax Jones, featuring American singer Demi Lovato and English rapper Stefflon Don. It was written by MNEK, Stefflon Don, Demi Lovato and Jax Jones, with the song's production handled by Jax Jones and Mark Ralph. It was released on 16 June 2017, through Polydor Records. "Instruction" is included on the deluxe edition of Lovato's sixth studio album, Tell Me You Love Me.

== Background ==
On 12 June 2017, Jax Jones first shared a snippet of the song on Twitter, along with the single's release date. Stefflon Don also tweeted a similar snippet a few minutes later, while Demi Lovato tweeted it on 13 June 2017, revealing the featured artists of the song. "This one's about to be fire," she captioned her post. Demi Lovato shared a longer teaser of the song on 14 June 2017, revealing more of the song's lyrics.

== Composition ==
"Instruction" is a dancehall song. The Brazilian website for Billboard wrote that the track begins with "[the] samba school's drums" and is followed by "a beat of reggaeton – the rhythm of the moment".

== Critical reception ==
Mike Wass of Idolator said: "The samba-infused banger, which boasts a verse from UK rapper Stefflon Don, is an instant Song of the Summer contender."

Kat Bein of Billboard stated that "it already promises to stomp summer radio into total submission." She described the song as a "massive tune led by booming drums with a colorful pop attitude, counter-pointed by the unmistakable party of Brazilian Carnival."

== Music video ==
The music video was filmed on 20 July 2017, in Los Angeles, California. The music video for Instruction was directed by Ozzie Pullin, and it was released on 2 August 2017. It shows Demi Lovato, Stefflon Don, Jax Jones and other backgrounds artists/dancers dancing and playing various instruments.

== Live performances ==
On 18 August 2017, Jones joined Demi Lovato on Good Morning America, where they made the first televised performance of the track. On 10 November 2017, Jones, Lovato and Stefflon Don performed the song for the first time together at BBC's Sounds Like Friday Night Show. In June 2018, Jones joined Demi Lovato during the Tell Me You Love Me World Tour to perform 'Instruction' during all UK dates except Birmingham.

== Usage in media ==
The song is featured in tenth episode of the television series The Bold Type. The song was featured in the 2017 dance rhythm game, Just Dance 2018. It was also played during the Miss Universe 2017 swimsuit competition. It is also used in a 2018 Schwarzkopf television advertisement in the United Kingdom.

== Track listing ==
Digital download
| No. | Title | Length |
|---|---|---|
| 1. | "Instruction" (featuring Demi Lovato and Stefflon Don) | 2:45 |

Digital download – Mr Eazi remix
| No. | Title | Length |
|---|---|---|
| 1. | "Instruction" (featuring Demi Lovato and Stefflon Don) (Mr Eazi remix) | 3:08 |

== Credits and personnel ==
Credits adapted from Tidal.

- Jax Jones – composer, lyricist, producer, drum programmer, programmer, recording arranger, synthesizer programmer
- Demi Lovato – composer, lyricist, vocalist
- Stefflon Don – composer, lyricist, vocalist
- MNEK – composer, lyricist
- Mark Ralph – producer, mixer
- Stuart Hawkes – mastering engineer
- Drew Smith – engineer
- Tom AD Fuller – assistant recording engineer

== Charts ==
=== Weekly charts ===
| Chart (2017–2018) | Peak position |
|---|---|
| Australia (ARIA) | 72 |
| Austria (Ö3 Austria Top 40) | 66 |
| Belgium (Ultratop 50 Flanders) | 37 |
| Belgium Dance (Ultratop Flanders) | 4 |
| Belgium (Ultratop 50 Wallonia) | 23 |
| Belgium Dance (Ultratop Wallonia) | 3 |
| CIS Airplay (TopHit) | 31 |
| Colombia (National-Report) | 97 |
| Croatia (HRT) | 49 |
| Czech Republic Airplay (ČNS IFPI) | 45 |
| Czech Republic Singles Digital (ČNS IFPI) | 56 |
| Euro Digital Songs (Billboard) | 17 |
| Finland Download (Latauslista) | 12 |
| France (SNEP) | 145 |
| Germany (GfK) | 31 |
| Guatemala Anglo (Monitor Latino) | 13 |
| Ireland (IRMA) | 29 |
| Israel (Media Forest TV Airplay) | 7 |
| Latvia (Latvijas Top 40) | 24 |
| Netherlands (Dutch Top 40) | 25 |
| Netherlands (Mega Top 50) | 41 |
| Netherlands (Single Top 100) | 50 |
| New Zealand Heatseekers (RMNZ) | 6 |
| Philippines (Philippine Hot 100) | 41 |
| Poland Airplay (ZPAV) | 22 |
| Portugal (AFP) | 70 |
| Russia Airplay (TopHit) | 27 |
| Scottish Singles Sales (Official Charts) | 10 |
| Slovakia Airplay (ČNS IFPI) | 75 |
| Slovakia Singles Digital (ČNS IFPI) | 47 |
| South Korea International (Gaon) | 51 |
| Sweden (Sverigetopplistan) | 94 |
| UK Singles (Official Charts) | 13 |
| UK Dance (Official Charts) | 3 |
| US Dance Club Songs (Billboard) | 34 |
| US Hot Dance/Electronic Songs (Billboard) | 22 |

=== Year-end charts ===
| Chart (2017) | Position |
|---|---|
| Latvia Airplay (LaIPA) | 91 |
| US Hot Dance/Electronic Songs (Billboard) | 56 |

== Certifications ==
| Region | Certification | Certified units/sales |
|---|---|---|
| Australia (ARIA) | Gold | 35,000^{‡} |
| Brazil (Pro-Música Brasil) | Platinum | 60,000^{‡} |
| Canada (Music Canada) | Gold | 40,000^{‡} |
| Denmark (IFPI Danmark) | Gold | 45,000^{‡} |
| France (SNEP) | Gold | 100,000^{‡} |
| Germany (BVMI) | Gold | 200,000^{‡} |
| Italy (FIMI) | Gold | 25,000^{‡} |
| New Zealand (RMNZ) | Gold | 15,000^{‡} |
| Poland (ZPAV) | Platinum | 50,000^{‡} |
| Spain (Promusicae) | Gold | 30,000^{‡} |
| United Kingdom (BPI) | Platinum | 600,000^{‡} |
Streaming
| Sweden (GLF) | Gold | 4,000,000^{†} |
^{‡} Sales+streaming figures based on certification alone.^{†} Streaming-only figures based on certification alone.

== Release history ==
| Country | Date | Format | Version | Label | Ref. |
|---|---|---|---|---|---|
| Various | April 16, 2017 | Digital download | Original | Polydor | |
| Italy | June 23, 2017 | Contemporary hit radio | Original | Universal | |
| Various | October 20, 2017 | Digital download | Mr Eazi remix | Polydor | |
