= Where Did You Go? =

2022 single by Jax Jones featuring MNEK

Single by Jax Jones featuring MNEK

from the EP Midnight Snacks (Part 1)
- Released: 4 February 2022
- Genre: Eurodance
- Length: 2:57
- Label: Polydor
- Songwriters: Mark Ralph; SIBA; Timucin Lam; Uzoechi Emenike; Wayne Hector
- Producers: Jax Jones; Mark Ralph; Neave Applebaum; Tom Demac; SIBA

Jax Jones singles chronology
"Out Out" (2021)	"Where Did You Go?" (2022)	"Good Luck" (2022)

MNEK singles chronology
"Who You Are" (2021)	"Where Did You Go?" (2022)	"The Funk" (2022)

"Where Did You Go?" is a song by English DJ Jax Jones featuring British singer MNEK. It was released on 4 February 2022, via Polydor Records. The song peaked at number 7 on the UK Singles Chart. When he performed it at the Queen's Platinum Party at the Palace in London, John Newman joined him on stage for the vocals. The cover art features smile-shaped potato bites, similar to McCain Smiles.

== Credits and personnel ==
Credits adapted from AllMusic.

- Tom Demac – producer, programming
- MNEK – composer, featured artist, primary artist, vocals
- Kevin Grainger – mastering engineer, mixing
- Wayne Hector – composer
- Jax Jones – musical producer, primary artist, producer, programming
- Timucin Lam – composer
- Mark Ralph – composer, producer, programming
- SIBA – composer, producer, programming

== Charts ==
=== Weekly charts ===
Weekly chart performance for "Where Did You Go?"
Chart (2022–2024)	Peak position
Australia (ARIA)	40
Australia Dance (ARIA)	3
Austria (Ö3 Austria Top 40)	50
Belgium (Ultratop 50 Flanders)	7
Belgium (Ultratop 50 Wallonia)	15
Canada Hot 100 (Billboard)	76
Canada CHR/Top 40 (Billboard)	37
CIS Airplay (TopHit)	1
Czech Republic Airplay (ČNS IFPI)	4
Czech Republic Singles Digital (ČNS IFPI)	84
Estonia Airplay (TopHit)	79
France (SNEP)	79
Germany (GfK)	27
Global 200 (Billboard)	118
Greece International (IFPI)	46
Hungary (Rádiós Top 40)	7
Hungary (Single Top 40)	12
Iceland (Tónlistinn)	33
Ireland (IRMA)	5
Kazakhstan Airplay (TopHit)	47
Latvia Airplay (TopHit)	188
Lithuania (AGATA)	46
Mexico Airplay (Billboard)	37
Netherlands (Dutch Top 40)	5
Netherlands (Single Top 100)	20
New Zealand Hot Singles (RMNZ)	13
Poland (Polish Airplay Top 100)	1
Portugal (AFP)	190
Romania Airplay (TopHit)	48
Russia Airplay (TopHit)	3
Slovakia Airplay (ČNS IFPI)	9
Slovakia Singles Digital (ČNS IFPI)	30
South Africa Radio (RISA)	75
Switzerland (Schweizer Hitparade)	45
Ukraine Airplay (TopHit)	3
UK Singles (OCC)	7
UK Dance (OCC)	2
US Hot Dance/Electronic Songs (Billboard)	13

=== Monthly charts ===
Monthly chart performance for "Where Did You Go?"
Chart (2022–2023)	Peak position
CIS Airplay (TopHit)	4
Czech Republic (Rádio Top 100)	17
Czech Republic (Singles Digitál Top 100)	79
Estonia Airplay (TopHit)	89
Kazakhstan Airplay (TopHit)	67
Lithuania Airplay (TopHit)	97
Romania Airplay (TopHit)	75
Russia Airplay (TopHit)	5
Slovakia (Rádio Top 100)	10
Slovakia (Singles Digitál Top 100)	30
Ukraine Airplay (TopHit)	4

=== Year-end charts ===
2022 year-end chart performance for "Where Did You Go?"
Chart (2022)	Position
Belgium (Ultratop 50 Flanders)	18
Belgium (Ultratop 50 Wallonia)	88
CIS Airplay (TopHit)	12
Germany (Official German Charts)	67
Global Excl. US (Billboard)	158
Netherlands (Dutch Top 40)	23
Netherlands (Single Top 100)	57
Poland (ZPAV)	1
Russia Airplay (TopHit)	19
Switzerland (Schweizer Hitparade)	95
UK Singles (OCC)	16
Ukraine Airplay (TopHit)	10
US Hot Dance/Electronic Songs (Billboard)	41

2023 year-end chart performance for "Where Did You Go?"
Chart (2022)	Position
CIS Airplay (TopHit)	118
Hungary (Rádiós Top 40)	28
Ukraine Airplay (TopHit)	119

2024 year-end chart performance for "Where Did You Go?"
Chart (2024)	Position
Estonia Airplay (TopHit)	136
Lithuania Airplay (TopHit)	110

2025 year-end chart performance for "Where Did You Go?"
Chart (2025)	Position
Lithuania Airplay (TopHit)	103

== Certifications ==
Certifications for "Where Did You Go?"
Region	Certification	Certified units/sales
Australia (ARIA)	Platinum	70,000^{‡}
Belgium (BRMA)	Gold	20,000^{‡}
Brazil (Pro-Música Brasil)	Gold	20,000^{‡}
Denmark (IFPI Danmark)	Platinum	90,000^{‡}
France (SNEP)	Gold	100,000^{‡}
Germany (BVMI)	Gold	200,000^{‡}
Italy (FIMI)	Platinum	100,000^{‡}
New Zealand (RMNZ)	Platinum	30,000^{‡}
Poland (ZPAV)	2× Platinum	100,000^{‡}
Spain (PROMUSICAE)	Gold	30,000^{‡}
United Kingdom (BPI)	2× Platinum	1,200,000^{‡}
^{‡} Sales+streaming figures based on certification alone.
