= House Work (song) =

Single by Jax Jones featuring Mike Dunn and MNEK

from the EP Snacks
- Released: 1 July 2016
- Recorded: 2015
- Genre: House
- Length: 2:37
- Label: Polydor
- Songwriters: Timucin Aluo; Uzoechi Emenike
- Producer: Jax Jones

Jax Jones singles chronology
"Yeah Yeah Yeah" (2015)	"House Work" (2016)	"You Don't Know Me" (2016)

MNEK singles chronology
"At Night (I Think About You)" (2016)	"House Work" (2016)	"Don't Stop Me Now" (2016)

Music video
- "House Work" on YouTube

"House Work" is a song by English DJ and record producer Jax Jones featuring vocals from American DJ and record producer Mike Dunn and British singer MNEK. The song was released as a digital download on 1 July 2016, through Polydor Records in the United Kingdom. The song peaked at number 85 on the UK Singles Chart. The single cover is Jones' first to resemble everyday commercial products, in this case the cover resembles a bottle of washing up liquid.

== Music video ==
The official music video to accompany the release of "House Work" was released on YouTube on 30 August 2016, running two minutes and 45 seconds.

A video was also released featuring a live mix of the song. The video features a fictional infomercial for a product called "House Work" (the bottle of liquid is the same as the one on the single's cover).

A visualiser/official audio using the extended version of the song was released on the 1 July, 2016, which depicted a cartoon version of the main artist, Jax Jones, dancing on the bottle of liquid.

== Track listing ==
Digital download
No.	Title	Length
1.	"House Work" (featuring Mike Dunn and MNEK)	2:37

== Charts ==
Chart (2016–2017)	Peak position
Ireland (IRMA)	92
Scotland Singles (OCC)	60
UK Singles (OCC)	85
UK Dance (OCC)	24
UK Singles Downloads (OCC)	44

== Certifications ==
Region	Certification	Certified units/sales
United Kingdom (BPI)	Gold	400,000^{‡}
^{‡} Sales+streaming figures based on certification alone.

== Release history ==
Region	Date	Format	Label	Ref.
United Kingdom	1 July 2016	Digital download	Polydor	
