= You Don't Know Me (Jax Jones song) =

Single by Jax Jones featuring Raye

from the EP Snacks
- Released: 9 December 2016
- Recorded: 2016
- Genre: Dance-pop; house
- Length: 3:33
- Label: Polydor
- Composers: Walter Merziger; Arno Kammermeier; Peter Hayo; Patrick Bodmer; Phil D. Young; Timucin Lam
- Lyricists: Uzoechi Emenike; Janee Bennett; Rachel Keen
- Producer: Jax Jones

Jax Jones singles chronology
"House Work" (2016)	"You Don't Know Me" (2016)	"Instruction" (2017)

Raye singles chronology
"By Your Side" (2016)	"You Don't Know Me" (2016)	"The Line" (2017)

Music video
- "You Don't Know Me" on YouTube

"You Don't Know Me" is a song by English DJ and record producer Jax Jones featuring vocals from English singer-songwriter Raye. The song, sampling the bassline of M.A.N.D.Y. vs. Booka Shade's 2005 hit "Body Language", was released as a digital download in the United Kingdom on 9 December 2016, through Polydor Records in the United Kingdom. The song peaked at number three on the UK Singles Chart.

== Music video ==
A lyric and audio video to accompany the release of "You Don't Know Me" was first released on YouTube on 8 December 2016, through Jax Jones's official YouTube account. A live version of the song was also uploaded and grime MC Stormzy makes a cameo appearance.

The music video contains a little girl roaming around in her home. There were cameo appearances of both Jax Jones and Raye. An official audio/visualiser featuring an extended version of the song was released on 9 December 2016 and reached a length of four and a half minutes. It depicted a cartoon Jax Jones dancing on a cereal box. (The same one used on the cover)

== Track listing ==
Digital download
No.	Title	Length
1.	"You Don't Know Me" (featuring RAYE)	3:33

Digital download – Dre Skull Remix
No.	Title	Length
1.	"You Don't Know Me" (featuring Raye and Spice)	3:34

== Charts ==
=== Weekly charts ===
Chart (2016–2017)	Peak position
Australia (ARIA)	12
Austria (Ö3 Austria Top 40)	7
Belgium (Ultratop 50 Flanders)	2
Belgium (Ultratop 50 Wallonia)	2
Bulgaria Airplay (PROPHON)	5
Canada Hot 100 (Billboard)	70
CIS Airplay (TopHit)	6
Colombia Airplay (National-Report)	82
Czech Republic Airplay (ČNS IFPI)	12
Czech Republic Singles Digital (ČNS IFPI)	13
Denmark (Tracklisten)	6
Finland (Suomen virallinen lista)	10
France (SNEP)	2
Germany (GfK)	3
Hungary (Dance Top 40)	8
Hungary (Rádiós Top 40)	20
Hungary (Single Top 40)	8
Ireland (IRMA)	3
Italy (FIMI)	9
Mexico Airplay (Billboard)	47
Netherlands (Dutch Top 40)	6
Netherlands (Single Top 100)	8
New Zealand (Recorded Music NZ)	35
Norway (VG-lista)	7
Poland Airplay (ZPAV)	12
Poland (Video Chart)	3
Portugal (AFP)	14
Romania Airplay (Media Forest)	7
Russia Airplay (TopHit)	4
Scottish Singles Sales (Official Charts)	3
Slovakia Airplay (ČNS IFPI)	17
Slovenia Airplay (SloTop50)	27
Spain (Promusicae)	19
Sweden (Sverigetopplistan)	6
Switzerland (Schweizer Hitparade)	5
UK Singles (Official Charts)	3
UK Dance (Official Charts)	1
US Dance Club Songs (Billboard)	33
US Hot Dance/Electronic Songs (Billboard)	13

=== Year-end charts ===
Chart (2017)	Position
Australia (ARIA)	54
Austria (Ö3 Austria Top 40)	43
Belgium (Ultratop Flanders)	7
Belgium (Ultratop Wallonia)	7
CIS Airplay (TopHit)	28
Denmark (Tracklisten)	22
Germany (Official German Charts)	20
Hungary (Dance Top 40)	22
Hungary (Rádiós Top 40)	55
Hungary (Single Top 40)	42
Hungary (Stream Top 40)	35
Israel International Airplay (Media Forest)	45
Italy (FIMI)	27
Latvia Airplay (LaIPA)	20
Netherlands (Dutch Top 40)	30
Netherlands (Single Top 100)	32
Poland Airplay (ZPAV)	48
Romania Airplay (Media Forest)	10
Russia Airplay (TopHit)	27
Spain (Promusicae)	73
Sweden (Sverigetopplistan)	51
Switzerland (Schweizer Hitparade)	23
Ukraine Airplay (Tophit)	94
UK Singles (Official Charts Company)	10
US Hot Dance/Electronic Songs (Billboard)	36

Year-end chart performance
Chart (2024)	Position
Lithuania Airplay (TopHit)	121

Year-end chart performance
Chart (2025)	Position
Lithuania Airplay (TopHit)	154

== Certifications ==
Certifications for "You Don't Know Me"
Region	Certification	Certified units/sales
Australia (ARIA)	3× Platinum	210,000^{‡}
Belgium (BRMA)	2× Platinum	40,000^{‡}
Brazil (Pro-Música Brasil)	Gold	30,000^{‡}
Canada (Music Canada)	2× Platinum	160,000^{‡}
Denmark (IFPI Danmark)	2× Platinum	180,000^{‡}
France (SNEP)	Diamond	233,333^{‡}
Germany (BVMI)	3× Gold	600,000^{‡}
Italy (FIMI)	3× Platinum	150,000^{‡}
Mexico (AMPROFON)	Gold	30,000^{‡}
New Zealand (RMNZ)	2× Platinum	60,000^{‡}
Poland (ZPAV)	2× Platinum	100,000^{‡}
Portugal (AFP)	Gold	5,000^{‡}
Spain (Promusicae)	Platinum	40,000^{‡}
Sweden (GLF)	2× Platinum	80,000^{‡}
United Kingdom (BPI)	3× Platinum	1,800,000^{‡}
United States (RIAA)	Gold	500,000^{‡}
^{‡} Sales+streaming figures based on certification alone.

== Release history ==
Country	Date	Format	Version	Label	Ref.
United Kingdom	9 December 2016	Digital download	Original	Polydor	
Italy	27 January 2017	Contemporary hit radio	Original	Universal	
United States	21 March 2017	Contemporary hit radio	Original	Polydor; Interscope	
United Kingdom	14 June 2017	Digital download	Dre Skull Remix	Polydor	
