= Mark Ralph (music producer) =

British record producer (born 1974)

- Born: Mark Ralph; 2 May 1974 (age 52); Stoke-on-Trent, Staffordshire, England
- Genres: Pop, electronic, reggae fusion, rock
- Occupations: Record producer, songwriter, musician, remixer
- Years active: 1992–present

Mark Ralph (born 2 May 1974) is a British record producer, mixer and songwriter. Spanning a wide range of genres, he is known for his contributuions to records from artists including Years & Years, Jax Jones, Clean Bandit, Aitch, Georgia, Sub Focus, Rudimental, Plan B, the Snuts, Gryffin, Zara Larsson, George Fitzgerald, Tom Walker, Eats Everything, A1 x J1, DJ Regard, Sam Ryder, Jess Glynne, Becky Hill, Rag'n'Bone Man and more.

As of December 2022, Ralph has 12 number one records across the UK Singles and Albums Charts, and was the inaugural recipient of the Producer of the Year award at the 2016 A&R Awards, for which he has been nominated a total of five times, most recently in 2022.

== Career ==
=== Early career ===
Born in Stoke-on-Trent, Staffordshire, England, Ralph started his career at the age of 18 as a session guitarist, playing and recording with a long list of artists including Pet Shop Boys, Ringo Starr, Sly & Robbie, Screaming Lord Sutch, Edwyn Collins, Gwen Stefani, Ronnie Wood, and Roy Ayers.

Having collaborated with artists across a wide range of genres, Ralph had a desire to cross into the world of music production, with his first producer cut coming as a member of the critically acclaimed electronic trio the Filthy Dukes. Releasing their only album Nonsense in the Dark in 2009, Ralph, as a member of Filthy Dukes, remixed the likes of Bloc Party, Florence and the Machine, the Temper Trap, Lady Gaga and Passion Pit, allowing him to develop an understanding of various sounds and genres.

=== 2010–2019 ===
In 2010, Ralph continued his move into music production, producing and mixing chart albums for artists including Hot Chip, Franz Ferdinand and Hot Natured.

Ralph continued to develop his production style across multiple genres throughout the 2010s. In 2014, he began his extensive creative relationship with Years & Years, co-producing their single "Desire" alongside Two Inch Punch. His production and songwriting work on the band's single "King" saw him secure his first UK number one single in 2015 as well as an Ivor Novello Award nomination for "PRS Most Performed Work".

Ralph's relationship with Years & Years continued into 2015 with the release of their debut album Communion, with production credits across the record including the number 2 single "Shine" and top-20 single "Eyes Shut". Communion hit the top of the charts in 13 countries, including number one on the UK Albums Chart.

In 2016, Ralph cemented his position in the world of dance music through collaborations with artists including Clean Bandit, Pete Tong and TIEKS. He co-produced and mixed Clean Bandit's international hit single "Rockabye", which spent nine weeks at number one on the UK Singles Chart and received nominations for both Best British Single and British Artist Video of the Year at the 2017 BRIT Awards.

Ralph's work with Pete Tong saw him collaborate with a 60-piece contemporary orchestra to create an album of dance music classics, which was released to critical acclaim in November 2016. The album was Pete Tong's first release to hit the top spot on the UK Albums Chart.

Ralph worked on three of the UK Official Charts' Top 40 Biggest Songs of 2017, with both Clean Bandit's "Symphony" and Jax Jones' "You Don't Know Me" making the top ten. Clean Bandit's "Rockabye" reached number 23 in the year-long chart.

Off the back of his success in the mid-2010s, Ralph's involvement in British recorded music continued to increase into 2018. He produced Rudimental's UK number one single "These Days" featuring Jess Glynne, Macklemore and Dan Caplen, as well as Friendly Fires' "Heaven Let Me In", and Raye's "Friends". In November of the same year, Ralph wrote, produced and mixed the Jax Jones and Years & Years single "Play".

=== 2020–present ===
In the midst of the COVID-19 pandemic, Ralph based himself within his studio complex Club Ralph to continue working on music remotely. His musical output increased as a result, with multiple critically acclaimed releases hitting shelves throughout the course of the year.

Since 2020, Ralph has worked with a wide range of acts, including Aitch, Tom Grennan, Georgia, 220 Kid, Clean Bandit, Years & Years, Jax Jones, Bad Boy Chiller Crew, Eats Everything, George Fitzgerald, Zara Larsson, the Snuts, Sub Focus, Becky Hill, Sam Ryder, Rita Ora, Kawala, Sea Girls, Sigala, James Arthur and more across production, songwriting and mixing.

Further collaborations in recent years include 220 Kid & Gracey's "Don't Need Love" which received a BRIT Award Nomination for Best British Single, "Starstruck" by Years & Years featuring Kylie Minogue, "Where Did You Go" by Jax Jones and MNEK, a global hit, and Sam Ryder's "Spaceman", which was performed at the 2022 Eurovision Song Contest, coming second to Ukraine.

Ralph worked on Shania Twain's 2023 album Queen of Me, which was also number one on the UK Albums Chart.

== Club Ralph ==
Club Ralph is a recording studio complex with five studios under one roof in West London. The complex has a focus on developing new talent, producers and songwriters under Ralph's supervision.

== Awards ==
- A&R Awards 2016 - Producer of the Year - won
- A&R Awards 2017 - Producer of the Year - nominated
- A&R Awards 2018 - Producer of the Year - nominated
- A&R Awards 2019 - Producer of the Year - nominated
- A&R Awards 2022 - Producer of the Year - nominated
- Ivor Novello - PRS Most Performed Work - ‘King - Years & Years’ - nominated

== Discography ==
=== Remixes ===
Remixes
- 2002 Ronnie Wood & Cilla Black – "Step Inside Love/Something Tells Me" (mix)
- 2002 Brand New Heavies & Jaguar Wright – "What If" (mix)
- 2002 Brand New Heavies – We Won't Stop (mixing/production)
- 2002 Eagle Films – "High Speed (soundtrack)" (mix)
- 2004 Sly & Robbie – Peter Tosh Band (mix)
- 2004 Brancaccio & Aisher – "Nu Republic" (mix)
- 2005 Rhian Benson & Pino Palladino – "Sign Your Name" (mix)
- 2005 Soul Mekanik – Eighty One (mix)
- 2005 Maxïmo Park – "I Want You To Stay With Me" (remix)
- 2005 Bloc Party – "Two More Years" (remix)
- 2005 The Rakes – "22 Grand Job" (remix)
- 2006 Foreign Islands – "We Know You Know It" (remix)
- 2006 The Rakes – "All Too Human" (remix)
- 2006 Young Knives – "Here Comes The Rumour Mill" (remix)
- 2006 Klaxons – "Four Horsemen" (remix)
- 2006 Cagedbaby – "16 Lovers" (remix)
- 2006 The Maccabees – "X Ray Vision" (remix)
- 2007 Midlake – "Roscoe" (remix)
- 2007 The Pioneers – "Sweet Inspiration" (remix)
- 2007 Cherry Ghost – "4am" (remix)
- 2007 The Whip – "Sister Siam" (remix)
- 2008 Sons & Daughters – "Chains" (remix)
- 2008 Róisín Murphy – "You Know Me Better" (remix)
- 2008 Heloise and Savoire Faire – "Illusions" (remix)
- 2008 Metronomy – "A Thing For Me" (remix)
- 2008 Kevin Rudolf feat. Lil' Wayne – "Let It Rock" (remix)
- 2008 Operahouse – "Change in Nature" (remix)
- 2009 The Enemy – "No Time For Tears" (remix)
- 2009 Late of the Pier – "Bathroom Gurgle" (remix)
- 2009 Tommy Sparks – "She's Got Me Dancing" (remix)
- 2009 Damian Lazarus – Smoke The Monster Out (mix)
- 2009 Vagabond – "Sweat (Until The Morning)" (remix)
- 2009 The xx – "Crystalised" (remix)
- 2009 White Lies – "To Lose My Life" (remix)
- 2009 Lady Gaga – "Paparazzi" (remix)
- 2009 Ian Brown – "Stellify" (remix)
- 2009 Bloc Party – "One Month Off" (remix)
- 2009 Madness – "Dust Devil" (remix)
- 2009 The Temper Trap – "Science of Fear" (remix)
- 2009 The Rakes – "1984" (remix)
- 2009 Friendly Fires – "Jump in the Pool" (remix)
- 2009 Hockey – "Learn To Lose" (album version mix + remix)
- 2010 Eli Paperboy Reed – "Come And Get It" (remix)
- 2010 The Rapture feat, Ben Rymer – "One Night Stand" (mix)
- 2010 Hot Chip feat. Bonnie Prince Billy – I Feel Better (mix)
- 2010 OneRepublic – "All The Right Moves" (remix)
- 2010 Tiesto feat. Bloc Party – "It's Not The Things You Say" (remix)
- 2010 The Strange Death of Liberal England – Drown Your Heart Again (mix)
- 2010 Ellie Goulding – "Guns and Horses" (remix)
- 2010 Bruce Springsteen – "Dream Baby Dream" (remix)
- 2010 Kirsty Almeida – "Late at Night" [Trojan Soundsystem] (remix)
- 2010 Lauren Pritchard – "Not The Drinking" [Short Club] (remix)
- 2010 Florence & the Machine – "Cosmic Love" [Short Club] (remix)
- 2010 Christina Aguilera – "Not Myself Tonight" (remix)
- 2010 Buzzcocks – Greatest Hits (mixing)
- 2010 Slash – "Beautiful Dangerous" (remix)
- 2010 Everything Everything – "Photoshop Handsome" [Sunday Girl] (remix)

=== As guitarist ===
Guitar credits
- 1993 Sister Sledge – "We Are Family" [Sure Is Pure Remix] (guitar)
- 1993 Max The Sax – "Manha de Brasil" (guitar)
- 1995 Astrofarm – "Strings Ain't What They Used To Be" (guitar/production)
- 1996 Lisa Moorish – I've Gotta Have It All (guitar)
- 1997 Natalie Imbruglia – Left of the Middle (guitar)
- 1997 DJ Rap – Learning Curve (guitar)
- 1998 Ringo Starr – "La De Da" (guitar)
- 1999 Tom Jones – Reload (guitar)
- 1999 Technique – "You And Me" (guitar)
- 1999 Alisha's Attic – "Barbarella" (guitar)
- 1999 Pet Shop Boys – "You Only Tell Me You Love Me When You're Drunk" (pedal-steel guitar)
- 1999 The Pretenders – "California" (guitar)
- 2000 Birth – Gotten Bold (guitar)
- 2000 Lee Griffiths – Northern Songs (guitar)
- 2002 Miramax – "Steal (soundtrack)" (guitar)
- 2002 Paul Oakenfold – Bunkka (guitar)
- 2002 Quivver – "It's Over" (guitar)
- 2002 Natacha Atlas – "One of These Days" (guitar)
- 2003 Jody Lei & Narada Michael Walden – "It Don't Go That Way" (guitar)
- 2003 Syntax – Syntax (guitar)
- 2003 Andy Gray – "Timecop 2 (soundtrack)" (guitar)
- 2003 Gary Numan – Hybrid (guitar)
- 2015 Chemical Brothers – "Go" (bass guitar)
