= Jax Jones =

English DJ (born 1987)

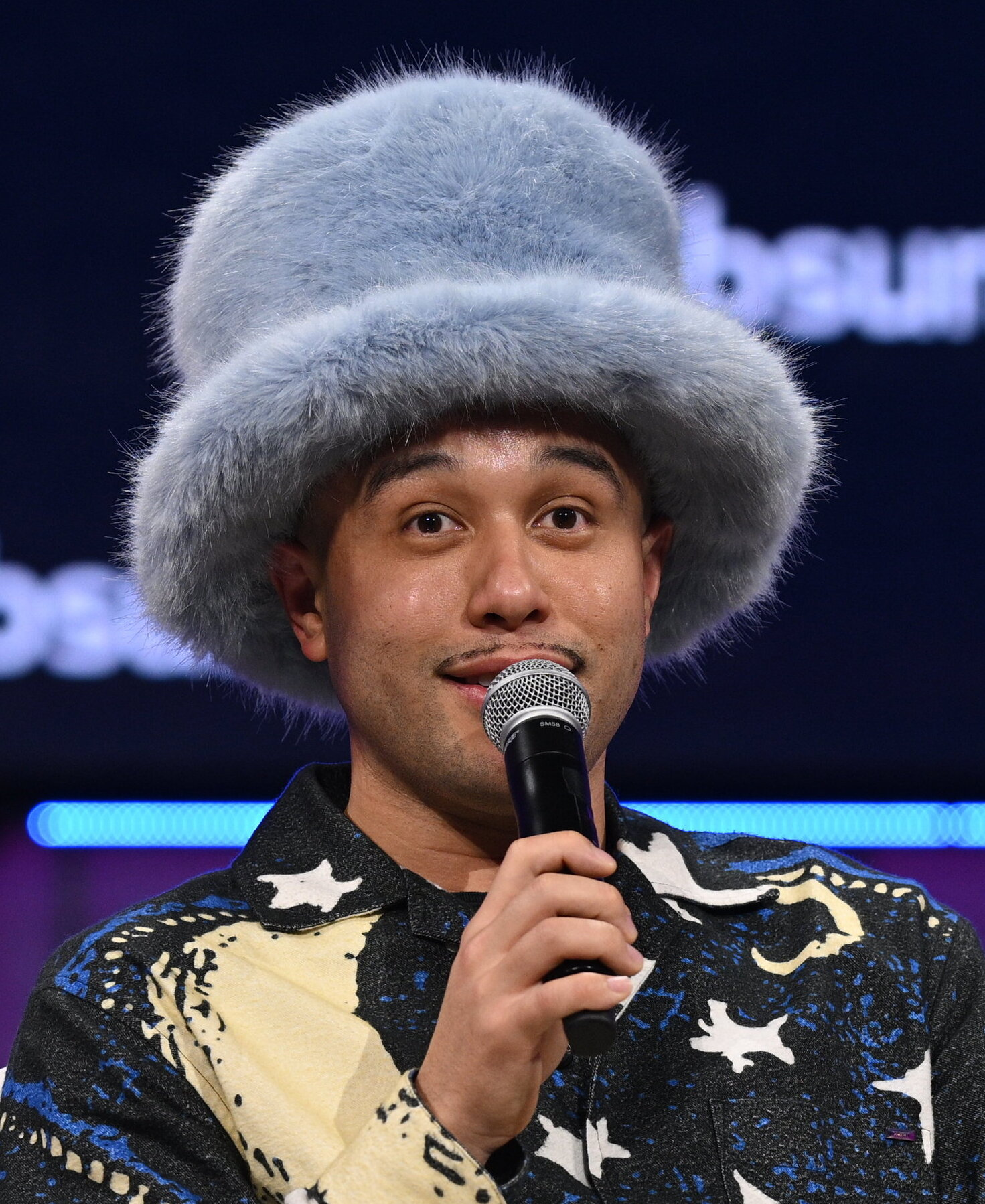
- Jones in 2023

Background information
- Born: Timucin Fabian Kwong Wah Aluo; 25 July 1987 (age 39); London, England
- Genres: House; deep house; tropical house; techno; Eurodance
- Occupations: Disc jockey; record producer; remixer
- Instruments: Keyboards; bass; guitar; drums
- Label: Polydor
- Member of: Europa
- Website: jaxjones.co.uk

Timucin Lam (born Timucin Fabian Kwong Wah Aluo; 25 July 1987), known professionally as Jax Jones, is an English DJ and record producer. He rose to prominence in 2014 by featuring on Duke Dumont's number-one single "I Got U". He followed this with his own singles, "You Don't Know Me" featuring Raye in 2016, and "Instruction" featuring Demi Lovato and Stefflon Don in 2017. Jax's debut studio album, Snacks (Supersize) was released in 2019.

== Early life and influences ==
Jones was born on 25 July 1987 in London to a Turkish father and a Chinese-Malaysian mother. His father gave him the name Timucin. After his Nigerian stepfather introduced him to afrobeat via Fela Kuti, and rap with a tape of a Notorious B.I.G. album, Jax listened to hip-hop, R&B, gospel, and traditional African music. His mother liked music ranging from Kylie Minogue to Luther Vandross, which also influenced him. Producers like the Neptunes, Timbaland, and Rodney Jerkins shaped his musical horizons and his fascination with the anatomy of a rhythm section. Having initially studied classical guitar from a young age, Jax took up beat-making at 15 after discovering Cubase on his friend's Atari.

== Career ==
=== Beginnings ===
Performing at open mic clubs around London, Jax met Ripperman, a grime producer from Mitcham, at Brixton's Raw Materials Studio and worked on releases for Big Narstie and Roadside Gs, among others in the scene. His parents encouraged him to attend university at 18. Opting to stay closer to Raw Materials, he declined an interview at the University of Oxford to attend Brunel University in Uxbridge. Despite a two-hour trip, Jax went from lectures to the studio daily to work on his craft, posting beats regularly on Myspace. After graduation, he rented a studio in Sydenham after not being allowed back in the family home, bought a Mac tower from Gumtree, and worked daily to hone his craft.

=== 2014: Breakthrough ===
After meeting Duke Dumont, he developed an interest in house music; they co-wrote and produced "I Got U", "Won't Look Back" and "Ocean Drive". Jones features on the single "I Got U"; the song peaked at number one on the UK Singles Chart in March 2014, leading to his breakthrough as a musical artist.

=== 2015–2019: Snacks ===
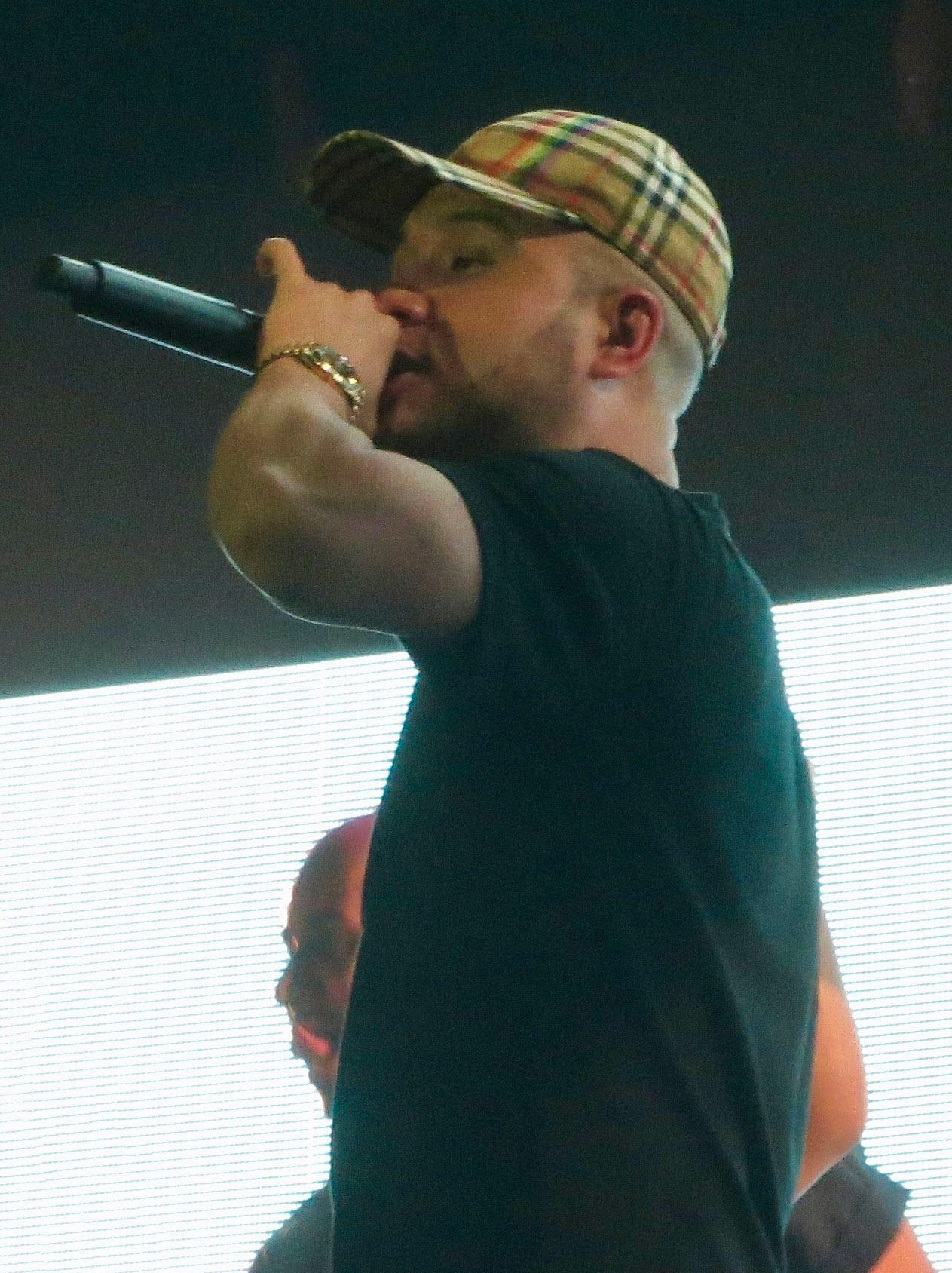
Jones performing in 2018

On 24 July 2015, he released the single "Yeah Yeah Yeah". In July 2016, he released the single "House Work". Jones said of the track, "At the end of the day, I started making beats on a four-track, so it feels right to put that DIY energy into my music". In December 2016, he released the single "You Don't Know Me" based on the sampling of the bassline of M.A.N.D.Y. vs. Booka Shade's 2005 hit "Body Language". The song became his biggest success, reaching number three in the UK and achieving top-five status in several European countries, including Germany, Ireland, Belgium, and Norway. Jones continued to release songs wherein he collaborated with Demi Lovato and Years & Years. He released his debut extended play, Snacks, on 28 November 2018. The EP was later expanded into Jones' first album, Snacks (Supersize), which was released on 6 September 2019.

=== 2020–present: Europa, Deep Joy and other singles ===
Jax also collaborated with DJ Martin Solveig to create the musical duo Europa. Their first song together, "All Day and Night" (featuring Madison Beer) was included on Jones' 2018 EP Snacks and was released as a single in March 2019. They released their next single, "Tequila" (featuring Raye), in February 2020. Their third collaboration, "Lonely Heart", features English singer GRACEY, and was released on 2 June 2022.

On 9 October 2020, Jones released the single "I Miss U" alongside Antiguan-German singer Au/Ra. The song peaked at Number 25 on the UK Singles Chart, and a subsequent acoustic version followed. Upon its release, Jones tweeted about the song's message in relation to the COVID-19 pandemic, and an inability to see family and friends due to national lockdown. He said, "We all miss something right now, and 'I Miss U' is supposed to highlight that and remind ourselves that it's ok to feel this way sometimes."

In January 2021, Jones promoted Irish music producer Emmet Glascott & singer Molly Morgans remix of Jones' song '100 Times' on his Instagram story.

On 4 June 2021, Jones announced the launch of his record label WUGD, in partnership with Polydor Records. The label's first song was "Feels", the lead single off his second EP Deep Joy, which was released on 2 July 2021.

13 August 2021 saw the release of "Out Out", a collaborative single with English DJ Joel Corry, featuring the vocals of singer Charli XCX and rapper Saweetie. The song peaked at #6 on the UK Singles Chart.

On 4 February 2022, Jones released the song "Where Did You Go?" featuring MNEK. The track became Jones' 8th UK Top 10 hit and MNEK's 5th, peaking at #7 on the UK Singles Chart for two weeks.

On 18 March 2022, Jones collaborated with Mabel and Galantis on the song "Good Luck".

On 4 June 2022, he participated in the Platinum Party at the Palace, performing with Nandi Bushell and Stefflon Don, as well as Mabel and John Newman to mark the Platinum Jubilee of Elizabeth II.

On 10 March 2023, Jones released "Whistle" featuring vocals from English singer Calum Scott.

On 11 August 2023, Big Hit Music released a Jax Jones remix version of "Do It Like That" by Tomorrow X Together (TXT)/Jonas Brothers.

After Dara won the Eurovision Song Contest 2026 with her song "Bangaranga", Jones released a remix of the song on 28 August.

== Personal life ==
On 18 September 2020, Jones announced on Instagram that his wife had given birth to their first daughter, Lawana. On 5 March 2023, his second daughter Ariyah was born.

== Discography ==
- Snacks (Supersize) (2019)

== Awards and nominations ==
Award	Year	Nominee(s)	Category	Result	Ref.
Brit Awards	2015	"I Got U" (with Duke Dumont)	British Video of the Year	Nominated	
Brit Awards	2015	"I Got U" (with Duke Dumont)	British Single of the Year	Nominated	
Brit Awards	2018	"You Don't Know Me" (with Raye)	British Single of the Year	Nominated	
Brit Awards	2019	"Breathe" (with Ina Wroldsen)	British Video of the Year	Nominated	
Grammy Awards	2015	"I Got U" (with Duke Dumont)	Best Dance Recording	Nominated	
Global Awards	2018	Himself	Rising Star Award	Nominated	
Global Awards	2020	Himself	Best Pop	Nominated	
Global Awards	2023	"Where Did You Go?" (with MNEK)	Most Played Song	Won	
Global Awards	2024	Himself	Best Male	Nominated	
Ivor Novello Awards	2019	"Breathe" (with Ina Wroldsen)	Most Performed Work	Nominated	
Teen Choice Awards	2017	Himself	Choice Next Big Thing	Nominated	
