= Mark Ralph production discography =

The following list is a discography of production and songwriting contributions by Mark Ralph, a British record producer currently based in London, England. It is split into the full list(s) of contributions and those that have performed in the charts across various countries.

== International singles and certifications ==
List of songwriting or production contributions that were released either as singles or album tracks, with year released, artist(s) involved, selected chart positions, certifications and album name. All songs are in order of initial release, which may coincide with an album release.
Title	Year	Peak chart positions										Certifications	Album
Title	Year	UK	AUS	BEL (FL)	NOR	GER	NL	NZ	SWI	SWE	US	Certifications	Album
"Boogie" (The Brand New Heavies)	2004	66	—	—	—	—	—	—	—	—	—		Allabouthefunk
"Surrender" (The Brand New Heavies)	2004	78	—	—	—	—	—	—	—	—	—		Allabouthefunk
"Infinity" (Infinity Ink)	2012	—	—	2	—	—	—	—	—	—	—		Non-album single
"Night & Day" (Hot Chip)	2012	—	—	30	—	—	—	—	—	—	—		In Our Heads
"How Do You Do?" (Hot Chip)	2012	—	—	59	—	—	—	—	—	—	—		In Our Heads
"Don't Deny Your Heart" (Hot Chip)	2012	—	—	35	—	—	—	—	—	—	—		In Our Heads
"Real" (Years & Years)	2014	158	—	—	—	—	—	—	—	—	—		Communion
"Extraordinary" (Clean Bandit featuring Sharna Bass)	2014	5	—	4	—	—	66	—	—	—	—	BPI: Silver; FIMI: Gold	New Eyes
"Foolish" (Blonde featuring Ryan Ashley)	2014	—	—	82	—	—	—	—	—	—	—		Non-album single
"Come Over" (Clean Bandit featuring Stylo G)	2014	45	—	7	—	76	—	—	—	—	—		New Eyes
"Take Shelter" (Years & Years)	2014	140	—	53	—	—	—	—	—	—	—	BPI: Silver	Communion
"Sunlight" (The Magician featuring Years & Years)	2014	7	20	7	—	—	37	—	—	—	—	BPI: Silver; ARIA: Gold; BEA: Gold; NVPI: Platinum	Non-album single
"Desire" (Years & Years)	2014	22	—	7	—	—	32	—	—	—	—	BPI: Gold; IFPI DEN: Gold	Communion
"I Loved You" (Blonde featuring Melissa Steel)	2014	7	—	31	—	25	—	—	56	—	—	BPI: Platinum	Non-album single
"King" (Years & Years)	2015	1	9	11	15	9	5	18	9	26	—	BPI: Platinum; ARIA: Platinum; RMNZ: Gold; RIAA: Gold; BEA: Platinum; IFPI DEN: Platinum; BVMI: Platinum; FIMI: x2 Platinum; GLF: x2 Platinum; ZPAV: x3 Platinum	Communion
"Huarache Lights" (Hot Chip)	2015	—	—	75	—	—	—	—	—	—	—		Why Make Sense?
"Stole the Show" (Kygo featuring Parson James)	2015	24	53	7	1	2	3	4	3	1	—	BPI: Platinum; ARIA: Platinum; RMNZ: Platinum; RIAA: Platinum; MC: x2 Platinum; IFPI NOR: x6 Platinum; BEA: Platinum; BVMI: Platinum; GLF: x5 Platinum; IFPI SWI: x3 Platinum	Cloud Nine
"Need You Now" (Hot Chip)	2015	—	—	70	—	—	—	—	—	—	—		Why Make Sense?
"All Cried Out" (Blonde featuring Alex Newell)	2015	4	—	9	—	—	—	—	—	—	—	BPI: Gold	Non-album single
"Shine" (Years & Years)	2015	2	15	18	—	29	77	—	41	81	—	BPI: Platinum; ARIA: Gold; IFPI DEN: Gold; BVMI: Gold; ZPAV: Platinum	Communion
"Foundation" (Years & Years)	2015	110	—	—	—	—	—	—	—	—	—		Communion
"Worship" (Years & Years)	2015	168	—	72	—	—	—	—	—	—	—		Communion
"Eyes Shut" (Years & Years)	2015	17	—	3	—	—	—	—	—	86	—	BPI: Platinum; IFPI DEN: Gold; GLF: Gold; ZPAV: Gold	Communion
"Ties" (Years & Years)	2015	172	—	—	—	—	—	—	—	—	—		Communion
"Frequency (All My Love)" (Watermät, TAI and Becky Hill)	2015	115	—	9	—	—	—	—	—	—	—		Non-album single
"Feel Good (It's Alright)" (Blonde featuring Karen Harding)	2015	76	—	—	—	—	—	—	—	—	—		Non-album single
"Sunshine" (Tieks featuring Dan Harkna)	2015	15	—	—	—	—	—	—	—	—	—		Non-album single
"Gone Missing" (Shift K3Y featuring BB Diamond)	2015	96	—	—	—	—	—	—	—	—	—		Non-album single
"Amazing" (Foxes)	2015	110	—	—	—	—	—	—	—	—	—		All I Need
"I'm in Control" (AlunaGeorge featuring Popcaan)	2016	39	64	25	—	—	50	—	—	—	—	BPI: Silver	I Remember
"Cruel" (Foxes)	2016	123	—	—	—	—	—	—	—	—	—		All I Need
"Nothing Like This" (Craig David and Blonde)	2016	15	71	—	—	—	—	—	—	93	—	BPI: Gold	Following My Intuition
"All Four Walls" (Gorgon City featuring Vaults)	2016	85	—	—	—	—	—	—	—	—	—	BPI: Silver	Escape
"Fiction" (Kygo featuring Tom Odell)	2016	62	—	—	—	—	—	—	—	—	—		Cloud Nine
"Shy" (The Magician featuring Brayton Bowman)	2016	—	—	32	—	—	—	—	—	—	—		Non-album single
"Tears" (Clean Bandit featuring Louisa Johnson)	2016	5	—	24	—	95	36	—	—	45	—	BPI: Platinum; FIMI: Gold	What Is Love?
"Meteorite" (Years & Years)	2016	72	—	17	—	—	—	—	—	—	—		Bridget Jones's Baby
"Rockabye" (Clean Bandit featuring Anne-Marie and Sean Paul)	2016	1	1	2	2	1	1	1	1	1	9	BPI: x3 Platinum; ARIA: x5 Platinum; RMNZ: Platinum; RIAA: x3 Platinum; MC: x7 Platinum; BEA: x2 Platinum; IFPI DEN: x2 Platinum; IFPI SWI: x2 Platinum; BVMI: x2 Platinum; NVPI: x5 Platinum	What Is Love?
"You Don't Know Me" (Jax Jones featuring Raye)	2016	3	12	2	7	3	8	35	5	6	—	BPI: x2 Platinum; ARIA: x2 Platinum; RIAA: Gold; GLF: x2 Platinum; BVMI: x3 Gold; FIMI: x3 Platinum; BEA: x2 Platinum; SNEP: Diamond	Snacks (Supersize)
"Giants" (Take That)	2017	13	—	—	—	—	—	—	—	—	—		Wonderland
"Tied Up" (Sub Focus and Julian Perretta)	2017	—	—	33	—	—	—	—	—	—	—		Non-album single
"Symphony" (Clean Bandit featuring Zara Larsson)	2017	1	4	3	1	9	4	12	6	1	—	BPI: x3 Platinum; ARIA: x5 Platinum; RMNZ: Platinum; RIAA: Platinum; MC: x4 Platinum; BEA: Platinum; BVMI: Platinum; IFPI DEN: Platinum; SNEP: Diamond; FIMI: x4 Platinum	What Is Love?
"Hot2Tocuh" (Felix Jaehn, Hight and Alex Aiono)	2017	—	—	57	—	12	—	—	49	—	—	BVMI: Platinum; IFPI AUT: Gold	I
"Instruction" (Jax Jones featuring Demi Lovato and Stefflon Don)	2017	13	72	37	—	31	50	6	—	94	—	BPI: Platinum; BVMI: Gold; PMB: Gold; FIMI: Gold	Snacks (Supersize)
"Disconnect" (Marina and Clean Bandit)	2017	—	—	49	—	—	—	—	—	—	—		Non-album single
"I Miss You" (Clean Bandit featuring Julia Michaels)	2017	4	20	5	18	49	10	17	43	34	92	BPI: Platinum; ARIA: x3 Platinum; RMNZ: Gold; RIAA: Gold; MC: x2 Platinum; BVMI: Gold; SNEP: Gold; IFPI DEN: Platinum; BEA: Platinum; FIMI: Gold	What Is Love?
"Breathe" (Jax Jones featuring Ina Wroldsen)	2017	7	—	14	—	15	51	—	13	—	—	BPI: Platinum; BEA: Gold; MC: Gold; BVMI: Gold; FIMI: Gold	Snacks (Supersize)
"These Days" (Rudimental featuring Dan Caplen, Jess Glynne and Macklemore)	2018	1	2	3	1	3	10	4	2	2	—	BPI: x3 Platinum; ARIA: x5 Platinum; RMNZ: Platinum; RIAA: Platinum; MC: x2 Platinum; IFPI DEN: x2 Platinum; BVMI: Platinum; FIMI: x3 Platinum; SNEP: Diamond; BEA: Platinum	Toast to Our Differences
"Lullaby" (Sigala and Paloma Faith)	2018	6	—	27	—	90	32	—	52	—	—	BPI: Platinum; ZPAV: Platinum	Brighter Days
"If You're Over Me" (Years & Years)	2018	6	—	50	—	—	—	—	—	43	—	BPI: Platinum; IFPI DEN: Gold; ZPAV: Gold	Palo Santo
"Solo" (Clean Bandit featuring Demi Lovato)	2018	1	7	3	3	1	14	21	2	2	58	BPI: x2 Platinum; ARIA: x2 Platinum; RMNZ: Gold; RIAA: Platinum; MC: x4 Platinum; NVPI: Gold; BVMI: Platinum; IFPI DEN: Platinum; BEA: Platinum; ZPAV: Diamond	What Is Love?
"Ring Ring" (Jax Jones featuring Mabel and Rich the Kid)	2018	12	—	14	—	—	—	—	—	—	—	BPI: Gold	Snacks (Supersize)
"All for You" (Years & Years)	2018	47	—	79	—	—	—	—	—	—	—		Palo Santo
"Friends" (Raye)	2018	66	—	—	—	—	—	—	—	—	—		Non-album single
"All I Am" (Jess Glynne)	2018	7	92	23	—	—	60	19	—	—	—	BPI: Platinum; ARIA: Gold; FIMI: Gold	Always In Between
"Started Out" (Georgia)	2018	—	—	26	—	—	—	—	—	—	—		Seeking Thrills
"Baby" (Clean Bandit featuring Marina and Luis Fonsi)	2018	15	—	5	—	—	—	20	—	—	—	BPI: Gold	What Is Love?
"Play" (Jax Jones and Years & Years)	2018	8	—	13	—	—	—	22	—	—	—	BPI: Gold	Snacks (Supersize)
"Mama" (Clean Bandit featuring Ellie Goulding)	2018	98	—	—	—	—	—	—	—	—	—		What Is Love?
"Just You and I" (Tom Walker)	2019	3	97	1	—	93	—	—	58	—	—	BPI: x2 Platinum; ARIA: Gold; MC: Gold; FIMI: Platinum	What a Time to Be Alive
"I Could Get Used to This" (Becky Hill and Weiss)	2019	45	—	—	—	—	—	—	—	—	—	BPI: Silver	Get to Know
"All Day and Night" (Jax Jones, Martin Solveig and Madison Beer)	2019	10	—	2	—	85	74	29	77	—	—	BPI: Platinum; SNEP: Gold; ZPAV: x2 Platinum	Snacks (Supersize)
"About Work the Dancefloor" (Georgia)	2019	—	—	44	—	—	—	—	—	—	—		Seeking Thrills
"One Touch" (Jax Jones and Jess Glynne)	2019	19	—	38	—	—	—	18	88	—	—	BPI: Gold	Snacks (Supersize)
"Something About You" (Elderbrook and Rudimental)	2019	87	—	28	—	—	—	—	—	—	—		Why Do We Shake in the Cold?
"Jacques" (Jax Jones and Tove Lo)	2019	67	—	—	—	—	—	—	—	61	—		Snacks (Supersize)
"This Is Real" (Jax Jones and Ella Henderson)	2019	9	—	—	—	—	26	—	—	—	—	BPI: Gold	Snacks (Supersize)
"Never Let You Go" (Georgia)	2019	—	—	36	—	—	—	—	—	—	—		Seeking Thrills
"Better Half of Me" (Tom Walker)	2019	30	—	—	—	—	—	—	—	—	—	BPI: Silver	What a Time to Be Alive (Deluxe Edition)
"24 Hours" (Georgia)	2020	—	—	41	—	—	—	—	—	—	—		Seeking Thrills
"This Is the Place" (Tom Grennan)	2020	73	—	—	—	—	—	—	—	—	—		Evering Road
"Tequila" (Jax Jones, Martin Solveig and Raye)	2020	21	—	—	—	—	—	32	—	—	—	BPI: Silver	Non-album single
"Tick Tock" (Clean Bandit and Mabel featuring 24kGoldn)	2020	8	61	3	—	48	27	16	17	94	—	BPI: Gold; BEA: Gold; FIMI: Platinum; ZPAV: Platinum	Non-album single
"Space" (Becky Hill)	2020	79	—	—	—	—	—	—	—	—	—		Non-album single
"I Miss U" (Jax Jones and Au/Ra)	2020	25	64	38	—	88	—	—	—	—	—	BPI: Silver; ZPAV: Gold	Non-album single
"Regardless" (Raye and Rudimental)	2020	37	—	—	—	—	—	—	—	—	—	ZPAV: Gold	Euphoric Sad Songs
"It's a Sin" (Years & Years or with Elton John)	2021	47	—	—	—	—	—	—	—	—	—		The Lockdown Sessions
"Higher" (Clean Bandit featuring Iann Dior)	2021	66	—	—	—	—	—	—	—	—	—		Non-album single
"Last Time" (Becky Hill)	2021	39	—	—	—	—	—	—	—	—	—	BPI: Silver	Only Honest on the Weekend
"Starstruck" (Years & Years or with Kylie Minogue)	2021	31	—	80	—	—	—	—	—	—	—	BPI: Silver	Night Call
"Drive" (Clean Bandit and Topic featuring Wes Nelson)	2021	17	—	—	—	—	—	—	—	—	—		Non-album single
"How Will I Know" (Whitney Houston and Clean Bandit)	2021	92	—	—	—	—	—	—	—	—	—		Non-album single
"Sweet Talker" (Years & Years and Galantis)	2021	94	—	—	—	—	—	—	—	—	—		Night Call

== Discography ==
=== Written songs ===
Year	Artist	Album	Song	Co-written with
2003	Overstreet	No Name Yet	"Reasons"	Julian Bendall, Alice Russell
2003	Atomic Kitten	Ladies Night	"Don't Go Breaking My Heart"	Jennifer Frost, Paul Alowoyin, Theeyazan Ahmed, Dominic Thrupp, Paul Wright
2004	Brand New Heavies	Allabouthefunk	"Keep On Shining"	Andrew Levy, Jan Kincaid
2006	The Remote	Too Low to Miss	"Please Change Your Mind"	Asad Rizvi, Ashley Casselle, Benjamin Lost
2009	Horace Andy with Ashley Beedle	Inspiration Information	"When the Rain Falls"	Horace Hinds, Ashley Beedle
2009	Horace Andy with Ashley Beedle	Inspiration Information	"Watch Me"	Horace Hinds, Ashley Beedle
2009	Horace Andy with Ashley Beedle	Inspiration Information	"Seek It"	Horace Hinds, Ashley Beedle
2009	Horace Andy with Ashley Beedle	Inspiration Information	"Rasta Don't"	Horace Hinds, Ashley Beedle
2009	Horace Andy with Ashley Beedle	Inspiration Information	"The Light"	Horace Hinds, Ashley Beedle
2009	Horace Andy with Ashley Beedle	Inspiration Information	"2 Way Traffic"	Horace Hinds, Ashley Beedle
2009	Horace Andy with Ashley Beedle	Inspiration Information	"Babylon You Lose"	Horace Hinds, Ashley Beedle
2009	Horace Andy with Ashley Beedle	Inspiration Information	"Hot Hot Hot"	Horace Hinds, Ashley Beedle
2009	Roy Ayers	Non-album single	"Positive Vibe" with Bah Samba	Roy Ayers, Julian Bendall
2012	Daniel Avery	Movement EP	"Light into Dark"	Daniel Avery
2012	Daniel Avery	Movement EP	"Flashlights"	Daniel Avery
2013	Hot Natured	Different Sides of the Sun	"Isis" feat. The Egyptian Lover	Luca Cazal, Lee Foss, Jamie Jones, Alexander Williams, Greg Broussard
2013	Hot Natured	Different Sides of the Sun	"Take You There"	Lee Foss, Jamie Jones, Alexander Williams
2013	Hot Natured	Different Sides of the Sun	"Tightrope"	Luza Cazal, Lee Foss, Jamie Jones, Alexander Williams, Anabel Englund
2013	Hot Natured	Different Sides of the Sun	"Mercury Rising" feat. Anabel Englund	Luza Cazal, Lee Foss, Jamie Jones, Alexander Williams, Anabel Englund
2013	Hot Natured	Different Sides of the Sun	"Alternate State" feat. Róisín Murphy	Luza Cazal, Lee Foss, Jamie Jones, Alexander Williams, Róisín Murphy
2013	Hot Natured	Different Sides of the Sun	"Physical Control"	Lee Foss, Jamie Jones, Alexander Williams
2013	Daniel Avery	Non-album single	"Knowing We'll Be Here"	Daniel Avery
2014	Ali Love	P.U.M.P.	"Deep into the Night"	Alexander Williams
2014	The Magician	Non-album single	"Sunlight" feat. Years & Years	Stephen Fasano, Oliver Thornton
2015	Years & Years	Communion	"King"	Oliver Thornton, Michael Goldsworthy, Emre Turkman, Andrew Smith
2015	The Magician	Non-album single	"Together"	Stephen Fasano, Karen Harding, Ryan Campbell, Edward Thomas, Zak Zilesnik
2015	Years & Years	Communion	"Ties"	Oliver Thornton, Michael Goldsworthy, Emre Turkman
2015	Years & Years	Communion	"Gold"	Oliver Thornton, Michael Goldsworthy, Emre Turkman
2015	Years & Years	Communion	"Without"	Oliver Thornton, Michael Goldsworthy, Emre Turkman
2015	Watermät	Non-album single	"All My Love" with TAI and Becky Hill	Lauren Arriau, Tai Jason, Rebecca Hill, Karen Poole
2016	AlunaGeorge	I Remember	"I'm in Control" feat. Popcaan	Aluna Francis, George Reid, Samuel Romans, Andrae Sutherland
2016	Rivrs	Falling EP	"Friend Lover"	Charlotte Mallory, Finn Kemp
2016	The Magician	Non-album single	"Shy" feat. Brayton Bowman	Stephen Fasano, Brayton Bowman, Ryan Campbell
2016	Rivrs	Falling EP	"Kill My Fears"	Charlotte Mallory, Finn Kemp
2016	Rivrs	Falling EP	"Last Love"	Charlotte Mallory, Finn Kemp
2016	AlunaGeorge	I Remember	"Full Swing" feat. Pell	Aluna Francis, George Reid, Jean-Baptiste Kouame, Jared Pellerin, Ryan Buendia
2016	AlunaGeorge	I Remember	"Hold Your Head High"	Aluna Francis, George Reid, Samuel Romans, Andrae Sutherland
2017	Salen	Non-album single	"Heartbreak Diet"	Leona Kamio, Paul Ayanwale, Simon Milner
2017	Sub Focus	Non-album single	"Lingua" feat. Stylo G	Nicholas Douwma, Chris Lane, Philip Thomas, John MacGillivray, Jason McDermott
2017	The Magician	Non-album single	"Tied Up" with Julian Perretta	Stephen Fasano, Julian Perretta, Sam John Gray, Oliver Goodman, Victoria Lamb
2017	Felix Jaehn	I	"Hot2Touch" with Hight and Alex Aiono	Felix Jaehn, Thomas Walker, Cass Lowe, Timothy Deal
2018	The Magician	Non-album single	"Las Vegas" with Ebenezer	Stephen Fasano, Ebenezer Fabiyi
2018	Years & Years	Palo Santo	"If You're Over Me"	Oliver Thornton, Steve McCutcheon
2018	Jax Jones	Snacks (Supersize)	"Ring Ring" feat. Mabel and Rich the Kid	Timucin Aluo, Uzoechi Emenike, Mabel McVey, Marlon Roudette, Camille Purcell
2018	Years & Years	Palo Santo	"All for You"	Oliver Thornton, Greg Kurstin
2018	Raye	Non-album single	"Friends"	Rachel Keen, Janee Bennett, Frederik Gibson, Nate Campany, Kyle Shearer
2018	Years & Years	Palo Santo	"Hypnotized"	Oliver Thornton
2018	Years & Years	Palo Santo	"Rendezvous"	Oliver Thornton, Michael Goldsworthy, Emre Turkmen
2018	Years & Years	Palo Santo	"Howl"	Oliver Thornton, Michael Goldsworthy, Emre Turkmen, Alex Hope
2018	Years & Years	Palo Santo	"Coyote"	Oliver Thornton
2018	Alice Chater	Non-album single	"Hourglass"	Alice Chater, Clarence Coffee Jr., Philip Oakley, John Callis, Philip Wright
2018	Georgia	Seeking Thrills	"Started Out"	Georgia Barnes
2018	Jax Jones	Snacks (Supersize)	"Play" with Years & Years	Timucin Aluo, Uzoechi Emenike, Oliver Thornton
2019	The Magician	Non-album single	"Ready for Love"	Stephen Fasano, Sophie Cooke
2019	Becky Hill	Get to Know	"I Could Get Used to This" with Weiss	Rebecca Hill, Ryan Campbell, Uzoechi Emenike, Michael Kintish
2019	Europa	Snacks (Supersize)	"All Day and Night" with Madison Beer	Timucin Aluo, Martin Picandet, Rebecca Hill, C. Purcell, Hailee Steinfeld, J. Bennett
2019	Georgia	Seeking Thrills	"About Work the Dancefloor"	Georgia Barnes
2019	Friendly Fires	Inflorescent	"Offline" with Friend Within	Edward MacFarlane, Jack Savidge, Edward Gibson
2019	Jax Jones	Snacks (Supersize)	"Jacques" with Tove Lo	Timucin Aluo, Uzoechi Emenike, Ebba Tove Nilsson
2019	Jax Jones	Snacks (Supersize)	"100 Times"	Timucin Aluo, Uzoechi Emenike, James Norton
2019	Jax Jones	Snacks (Supersize)	"Cruel"	Timucin Aluo, Uzoechi Emenike, Madison Love, Brett McLaughlin
2019	Georgia	Seeking Thrills	"Never Let You Go"	Georgia Barnes
2020	Georgia	Seeking Thrills	24 Hours"	Georgia Barnes
2020	Georgia	Seeking Thrills	"Til I Own It"	Georgia Barnes
2020	Georgia	Seeking Thrills	"I Can't Wait"	Georgia Barnes
2020	Georgia	Seeking Thrills	"Ray Guns"	Georgia Barnes
2020	Lindsay Lohan	Non-album single	"Back to Me"	Alma-Sofia Miettinen, Chiara Hunter
2020	Alma	Have U Seen Her?	"Mama"	Alma-Sofia Miettinen, Justin Tranter, Tinucin Aluo
2020	Becky Hill	TBA	"Space"	Rebecca Hill, Josh Record, David Whelan, Michael Di Scala
2021	Rebecca Ferguson	Non-album single	"No Words Needed" feat. Nile Rodgers	Rebecca Ferguson, Daniel Bryer, Mike Needle, Nile Rodgers, Russell Graham
2021	Years & Years	TBA	"Starstruck"	Oliver Thornton, Clarence Coffee Jr., Nathaniel Ledwidge
2021	Jack Savoretti	Europiana	"Who's Hurting Who" feat. Nile Rodgers	Jack Savoretti, Nile Rodgers
2021	Georgia	Non-album single	"Get Me Higher" with David Jackson	Georgia Barnes, David Jackson

=== Produced songs ===
indicates a co-production credit

indicates an additional production credit

indicates a vocal production credit

^{^[c]} signifies another name labelled as a co-producer

^{^[a]} signifies another name labelled as an additional producer

^{^[v]} signifies another name labelled as a vocal producer

Year	Artist	Album	Song	Produced with
2003	Overstreet	No Name Yet	"Reasons"	Julian Bendall, Stevie Solo Middleton^{[a]}
2003	Belezamusica	Belezamusica	"U Got Me Spinning"	Julian Bendall
2003	Belezamusica	Belezamusica	"Running Away"	Julian Bendall
2004	Bah Samba	4	"Portuguese Alove"	Julian Bendall
2004	Bah Samba	4	"Inner Soul"	Julian Bendall
2004	Bah Samba	4	"Calma"	Julian Bendall
2004	Brand New Heavies	Allabouthefunk	"Boogie"	Brand New Heavies, Pete "Slide" Martin^{[a]}
2004	Brand New Heavies	Allabouthefunk	"Need Some More"	Brand New Heavies
2004	Brand New Heavies	Allabouthefunk	"Waste My Time"	Brand New Heavies
2004	Brand New Heavies	Allabouthefunk	"Keep on Shining"	Brand New Heavies
2004	Brand New Heavies	Allabouthefunk	"What Do You Take Me For?"	Brand New Heavies, Pete "Slide" Martin^{[a]}
2004	Brand New Heavies	Allabouthefunk	"Surrender"	Brand New Heavies, Pete "Slide" Martin^{[a]}
2004	Brand New Heavies	Allabouthefunk	"Many Rivers to Cross"	Brand New Heavies
2004	Brand New Heavies	Allabouthefunk	"How Do You Think"	Brand New Heavies
2004	Brand New Heavies	Allabouthefunk	"Everytime We Turn It Up"	Brand New Heavies
2004	Brand New Heavies	Allabouthefunk	"How We Do This"	Brand New Heavies
2006	The Remote	Too Low to Miss	"Right Meat"	Ashley Casselle, James Christopher
2006	The Fatback Band	Non-album single	"Spanish Hustle" feat. Bah Samba	Julian Bendall
2007	The Fatback Band	Non-album single	"Feel the Fire"	The Fatback Band, Julian Bendall^{[a]}
2007	Belezamusica	Non-album single	"Inside Out"	Julian Bendall
2008	TSDOLE	Non-album single	"Angelou"	Dave Allen
2008	The Alps	Something I Might Regret	"Not So Laughable Now"	No additional producers
2009	Horace Andy with Ashley Beedle	Inspiration Information	"When the Rain Falls"	Ashley Beedle
2009	Horace Andy with Ashley Beedle	Inspiration Information	"Watch Me"	Ashley Beedle
2009	Horace Andy with Ashley Beedle	Inspiration Information	"Seek It"	Ashley Beedle
2009	Horace Andy with Ashley Beedle	Inspiration Information	"Rasta Don't"	Ashley Beedle
2009	Horace Andy with Ashley Beedle	Inspiration Information	"The Light"	Ashley Beedle
2009	Horace Andy with Ashley Beedle	Inspiration Information	"Angie"	Ashley Beedle
2009	Horace Andy with Ashley Beedle	Inspiration Information	"2 Way Traffic"	Ashley Beedle
2009	Horace Andy with Ashley Beedle	Inspiration Information	"Babylon You Lose"	Ashley Beedle
2009	Horace Andy with Ashley Beedle	Inspiration Information	"Hot Hot Hot"	Ashley Beedle
2009	Horace Andy with Ashley Beedle	Inspiration Information	"Festival Song"	Ashley Beedle
2009	The Social	A Call to Arms EP	"The Fallen"	The Social, Dave Allen
2009	The Social	A Call to Arms EP	"UK Gothic"	The Social, Dave Allen
2009	The Social	A Call to Arms EP	"To the Bone"	The Social, Dave Allen
2009	The Social	A Call to Arms EP	"Under Grey English Skies"	The Social, Dave Allen
2009	The Social	A Call to Arms EP	"Hugo"	The Social, Dave Allen
2009	Roy Ayers	Non-album single	"Positive Vibe" with Bah Samba	Julian Bendall
2010	Egyptian Hip Hop	Some Reptiles Grew; Wings EP	"Moon Crooner"	Egyptian Hip Hop, Hudson Mohawke
2010	Egyptian Hip Hop	Some Reptiles Grew; Wings EP	"Rad Pitt"	Egyptian Hip Hop, Hudson Mohawke
2010	Egyptian Hip Hop	Some Reptiles Grew; Wings EP	"Middle Name Period"	Egyptian Hip Hop, Hudson Mohawke
2010	Egyptian Hip Hop	Some Reptiles Grew; Wings EP	"Native"	Egyptian Hip Hop, Hudson Mohawke
2011	Digitalism	I Love You Dude	"2 Hearts"	Digitalism
2011	Digitalism	I Love You Dude	"Stratosphere"	Digitalism
2011	Digitalism	I Love You Dude	"Circles"	Digitalism
2011	Digitalism	I Love You Dude	"Blitz"	Digitalism
2011	Digitalism	I Love You Dude	"Forrest Gump"	Digitalism
2011	Digitalism	I Love You Dude	"Reeperbahn"	Digitalism
2011	Digitalism	I Love You Dude	"Antibiotics"	Digitalism
2011	Digitalism	I Love You Dude	"Just Gazin"	Digitalism
2011	Digitalism	I Love You Dude	"Miami Showdown"	Digitalism
2011	Digitalism	I Love You Dude	"Encore"	Digitalism
2011	Digitalism	I Love You Dude	"Harrison Fjord"	Digitalism
2012	Hot Natured	Different Sides of the Sun	"Forward Motion"	Hot Natured
2012	Reptile Youth	Reptile Youth	"Speeddance"	Reptile Youth, Dave Allen
2012	Infinity Ink	Non-album single	"Infinity"	Infinity Ink
2012	Daniel Avery	Movement EP	"Light into Dark"	Daniel Avery
2012	Daniel Avery	Movement EP	"Flashlights"	Daniel Avery
2012	Hot Chip	In Our Heads	"Night & Day"	Hot Chip
2012	Hot Chip	In Our Heads	"Motion Sickness"	Hot Chip
2012	Hot Chip	In Our Heads	"How Do You Do?"	Hot Chip
2012	Hot Chip	In Our Heads	"Don't Deny Your Heart"	Hot Chip
2012	Hot Chip	In Our Heads	"Look at Where We Are"	Hot Chip
2012	Hot Chip	In Our Heads	"These Chains"	Hot Chip
2012	Hot Chip	In Our Heads	"Flues"	Hot Chip
2012	Hot Chip	In Our Heads	"Now There is Nothing"	Hot Chip
2012	Hot Chip	In Our Heads	"Ends of the Earth"	Hot Chip
2012	Hot Chip	In Our Heads	"Let Me Be Him"	Hot Chip
2012	Hot Chip	In Our Heads	"Always Been Your Love"	Hot Chip
2012	Hot Natured	Different Sides of the Sun	"Benediction"	Hot Natured
2012	Reptile Youth	Reptile Youth	"Black Swan Born White"	Reptile Youth, Dave Allen
2012	Reptile Youth	Reptile Youth	"Morning Sun"	Reptile Youth, Dave Allen
2012	Reptile Youth	Reptile Youth	"Dead End"	Reptile Youth, Dave Allen
2012	Reptile Youth	Reptile Youth	"Be My Yoko Ono"	Reptile Youth, Dave Allen
2012	Reptile Youth	Reptile Youth	"A Flash in the Forest"	Reptile Youth, Dave Allen
2012	Reptile Youth	Reptile Youth	"Shooting Up Sunshine"	Reptile Youth, Dave Allen
2012	Reptile Youth	Reptile Youth	"It's Easy to Lose Yourself"	Reptile Youth, Dave Allen
2012	Reptile Youth	Reptile Youth	"Heart Blood Beat"	Reptile Youth, Dave Allen
2012	Reptile Youth	Reptile Youth	"Fear"	Reptile Youth, Dave Allen
2013	Only Real	Days in the City EP	"Punks and Potions"	No additional producers
2013	Only Real	Days in the City EP	"Get It On"	No additional producers
2013	Hot Natured	Different Sides of the Sun	"Reverse Skydiving" feat. Anabel Englund	Hot Natured
2013	Hot Chip	Non-album single	"Dark and Stormy"	Hot Chip
2013	Hot Natured	Different Sides of the Sun	"Isis" feat. The Egyptian Lover	Hot Natured
2013	Hot Natured	Different Sides of the Sun	"Operate" feat. Kenny Glasgow	Hot Natured
2013	Hot Natured	Different Sides of the Sun	"Different Sides"	Hot Natured
2013	Hot Natured	Different Sides of the Sun	"People Change" feat. S.Y.F.	Hot Natured
2013	Hot Natured	Different Sides of the Sun	"Take You There"	Hot Natured
2013	Hot Natured	Different Sides of the Sun	"Planet Us"	Hot Natured
2013	Hot Natured	Different Sides of the Sun	"Tightrope"	Hot Natured
2013	Hot Natured	Different Sides of the Sun	"Mercury Rising" feat. Anabel Englund	Hot Natured
2013	Hot Natured	Different Sides of the Sun	"Alternate State" feat. Róisín Murphy	Hot Natured
2013	Hot Natured	Different Sides of the Sun	"Detroit"	Hot Natured, MK
2013	Hot Natured	Different Sides of the Sun	"Physical Control"	Hot Natured
2013	Hot Natured	Different Sides of the Sun	"Emerald City" feat. Anabel Englund	Hot Natured
2014	Years & Years	Communion	"Real"	Years & Years, Andy Smith
2014	Clean Bandit	New Eyes	"Extraordinary" feat. Sharna Bass	Jack Patterson, Grace Chatto
2014	Blonde	Non-album single	"Foolish" feat. Ryan Ashley	Blonde
2014	Clean Bandit	New Eyes	"Come Over" feat. Stylo G	Jack Patterson
2014	Clean Bandit	New Eyes	"Cologne" feat. Nikki Cislyn and Javeon	Jack Patterson
2014	Clean Bandit	New Eyes	"Up Again" feat. Rae Morris	Jack Patterson, Andy Gangadeen^{[a]}, Nick Cohen^{[a]}
2014	Clean Bandit	New Eyes	"Heart on Fire" feat. Elisabeth Troy	Jack Patterson
2014	Clean Bandit	New Eyes	"New Eyes" feat. Lizzo	Jack Patterson
2014	Ali Love	P.U.M.P.	"Pumping 4 AI (Intro)"	Ali Love
2014	Ali Love	P.U.M.P.	"Deep into the Night"	Ali Love
2014	Ali Love	P.U.M.P.	"Dirty Stories" feat. Deep Condition	Ali Love, Steve Dub^{[a]}
2014	Ali Love	P.U.M.P.	"Perfect Picture"	Ali Love, Steve Dub
2014	Ali Love	P.U.M.P.	"Surrender"	Ali Love
2014	Ali Love	P.U.M.P.	"Ride On" feat. Kenny Glasgow	Ali Love, Luca Cazal^{[a]}, George Levings^{[a]}
2014	Blonde	Non-album single	"Higher Ground" feat. Charlie Taft	Blonde
2014	Years & Years	Communion	"Take Shelter"	Years & Years, Andy Smith
2014	Holly Johnson	Europa	"Follow Your Heart"	Holly Johnson
2014	Holly Johnson	Europa	"In and Out of Love"	Holly Johnson
2014	The Magician	Non-album single	"Sunlight" feat. Years & Years	The Magician
2014	Holly Johnson	Europa	"Heaven's Eyes"	Holly Johnson
2014	Holly Johnson	Europa	"So Much It Hurts"	Holly Johnson
2014	Holly Johnson	Europa	"Dancing With No Fear"	Holly Johnson
2014	Holly Johnson	Europa	"Europa"	Holly Johnson
2014	Holly Johnson	Europa	"Glorious"	Holly Johnson
2014	Holly Johnson	Europa	"Hold on Tight"	Holly Johnson
2014	Holly Johnson	Europa	"Lonesome Town"	Holly Johnson
2014	Holly Johnson	Europa	"You're in My Dreams Tonight"	Holly Johnson
2014	Holly Johnson	Europa	"The Sun Will Shine Again"	Holly Johnson
2014	Years & Years	Communion	"Desire"	Two Inch Punch, Years & Years^{[a]}
2014	Blonde	Non-album single	"I Loved You" feat. Melissa Steel	Blonde
2015	Years & Years	Communion	"King"	Years & Years, Andy Smith^{[a]}
2015	Hot Chip	Why Make Sense?	"Huarache Lights"	Hot Chip
2015	Kygo	Cloud Nine	"Stole the Show" feat. Parson James	Kygo
2015	Hot Chip	Why Make Sense?	"Need You Now"	Hot Chip
2015	Blonde	Non-album single	"All Cried Out" feat. Alex Newell	Blonde, Cass Lowe^{[a]}, Lucas Secon^{[a]}, Pete Hoffman^{[v]}, Steve Caitzone^{[v]}
2015	Hot Chip	Why Make Sense?	"Love is the Future" feat. Posdnuos	Hot Chip
2015	Hot Chip	Why Make Sense?	"Cry for You"	Hot Chip
2015	Hot Chip	Why Make Sense?	"Started Right"	Hot Chip
2015	Hot Chip	Why Make Sense?	"White Wine and Fried Chicken"	Hot Chip
2015	Hot Chip	Why Make Sense?	"Dark Night"	Hot Chip
2015	Hot Chip	Why Make Sense?	"Easy to Get"	Hot Chip
2015	Hot Chip	Why Make Sense?	"So Much Further to Go"	Hot Chip
2015	Hot Chip	Why Make Sense?	"Why Make Sense?"	Hot Chip
2015	Years & Years	Communion	"Shine"	Years & Years
2015	Years & Years	Communion	"Foundation"	Years & Years
2015	Years & Years	Communion	"Worship"	Years & Years, TMS
2015	Years & Years	Communion	"Eyes Shut"	Years & Years, Two Inch Punch, Mike Spencer^{[a]}
2015	Years & Years	Communion	"Ties"	Years & Years
2015	Years & Years	Communion	"Gold"	Years & Years
2015	Years & Years	Communion	"Without"	Years & Years
2015	Years & Years	Communion	"Border"	Years & Years
2015	Years & Years	Communion	"Memo"	Years & Years
2015	Years & Years	Communion	"1977"	Years & Years
2015	Years & Years	Communion	"Ready for You"	Years & Years
2015	Years & Years	Communion	"I Want to Love"	Years & Years
2015	Blonde	Non-album single	"Feel Good (It's Alright)" feat. Karen Harding	Blonde, Hal Ritson
2015	The Six	Non-album single	"(Don't Go) Running"	Richard Boardman, Pablo Bowman, Robert Harvey
2015	XYConstant	Non-album single	"Do It Well" feat. Tom Aspaul	XY Constant, Tom Aspaul^{[v]}
2015	Kwabs	Love + War	"Love + War"	Kwabs, Cass Lowe
2015	Tieks	Non-album single	"Sunshine" feat. Dan Harkna	Tieks
2015	Lion Babe	Begin	"Where Do We Go"	Astro Raw, Robin Hannibal, Itai Shapira^{[c]}
2015	Shift K3Y	Non-album single	"Gone Missing" feat. BB Diamond	Shift K3Y
2015	Foxes	All I Need	"Amazing"	No additional producers
2016	AlunaGeorge	I Remember	"I'm in Control" feat. Popcaan	AlunaGeorge
2016	Foxes	All I Need	"Rise Up (Intro)"	No additional producers
2016	Foxes	All I Need	"Cruel"	No additional producers
2016	Foxes	All I Need	"Wicked Love"	No additional producers
2016	Foxes	All I Need	"Money"	No additional producers
2016	Foxes	All I Need	"Shoot Me Down"	No additional producers
2016	Foxes	All I Need	"Lose My Cool"	No additional producers
2016	Foxes	All I Need	"Rise Up (Reprise)"	No additional producers
2016	Rivrs	Falling EP	"Friend Lover"	No additional producers
2016	Craig David	Following My Intuition	"Nothing Like This" with Blonde	Blonde, Hitimpulse^{[a]}
2016	Gorgon City	Escape	"All Four Walls" feat. Vaults	Gorgon City, Barney Freeman
2016	Dusky	Outer	"Ingrid Is a Hybrid"	Dusky, Hal Ritson^{[a]}
2016	Kygo	Cloud Nine	"Fiction" feat. Tom Odell	Kygo
2016	The Magician	Non-album single	"Shy" feat. Brayton Bowman	The Magician
2016	Gorgon City	Non-album single	"Doubts"	Gorgon City, f a l l e n^{[a]}
2016	Clean Bandit	What Is Love?	"Tears" feat. Louisa Johnson	Jack Patterson
2016	AlunaGeorge	I Remember	"Mean What I Mean" with Leikeli47 and Dreezy	AlunaGeorge, Utters
2016	Rivrs	Falling EP	"Falling"	Bastian Langebaek
2016	Honne	Warm on a Cold Night	"Baby You're Bad"	Honne
2016	Rivrs	Falling EP	"Kill My Fears"	No additional producers
2016	Rivrs	Falling EP	"Last Love"	No additional producers
2016	AlunaGeorge	I Remember	"Mediator"	AlunaGeorge
2016	Years & Years	Bridget Jones's Baby OST	"Meteorite"	Years & Years
2016	AlunaGeorge	I Remember	"Full Swing" feat. Pell	AlunaGeorge
2016	AlunaGeorge	I Remember	"Hold Your Head High"	AlunaGeorge
2016	AlunaGeorge	I Remember	"In My Head"	AlunaGeorge
2016	AlunaGeorge	I Remember	"Heartbreak Horizon"	AlunaGeorge
2016	Gorgon City	Non-album single	"Smile" feat. Elderbrook	Gorgon City, William Wiik Larsen
2016	Dusky	Outer	"Tiers"	Dusky
2016	Frances	Things I've Never Said	"Under Our Feet"	Steve Fitzmaurice, Frances^{[c]}, Dave McCracken^{[a]}
2016	Clean Bandit	What Is Love?	"Rockabye" feat. Anne-Marie and Sean Paul	Jack Patterson, Steve Mac
2016	Jack Savoretti	Sleep No More	"When We Were Lovers"	No additional producers
2016	Jax Jones	Snacks (Supersize)	"You Don't Know Me" feat. Raye	Jax Jones
2017	Sälen	Non-album single	"Heartbreak Diet"	Sälen
2017	Take That	Wonderland	"Giants"	No additional producers
2017	Sub Focus	Non-album single	"Lingua" feat. Stylo G	Sub Focus
2017	Clean Bandit	What Is Love?	"Symphony" feat. Zara Larsson	Jack Patterson
2017	Take That	Wonderland	"New Day"	No additional producers
2017	Take That	Wonderland	"Come On Love"	No additional producers
2017	Fickle Friends	You Are Someone Else	"Glue"	Fickle Friends
2017	Jax Jones	Snacks (Supersize)	"Instruction" feat. Demi Lovato and Stefflon Don	Jax Jones
2017	Marina	Non-album single	"Disconnect" with Clean Bandit	Jack Patterson, Luke Patterson
2017	Dan Caplen	Flat Champagne EP	"Flat Champagne" feat. Ray BLK	Jordan Riley
2017	Rationale	Rationale	"Loving Life"	Rationale
2017	Taya	Taya	"When Ur Sober" feat. Yxng Bane	Arnthor Birgisson, Sisqó^{[a]}, Diztortion^{[a]}
2017	Tieks	Non-album single	"Say a Prayer" feat. Chaka Khan and Popcaan	Tieks
2017	Betsy	Betsy	"Heavy Head"	Aaron Horn, Fred Cox, Jay Reynolds^{[a]}
2017	Betsy	Betsy	"You Won't Love Me"	Jack McManus, Peter Jarrett^{[a]}
2017	Clean Bandit	What Is Love?	"I Miss You" feat. Julia Michaels	Jack Patterson, Grace Chatto
2017	Jax Jones	Snacks (Supersize)	"Breathe" feat. Ina Wroldsen	Jax Jones
2018	The Magician	Non-album single	"Las Vegas" with Ebenezer	The Magician
2018	Rudimental	Toast to Our Differences	"These Days" feat. Dan Caplen, Jess Glynne and Macklemore	Rudimental, Julian Bunetta, John Ryan
2018	Sigala	Brighter Days	"Lullaby" with Paloma Faith	Sigala, Jarly, Joe Ashworth
2018	John Newman	Non-album single	"Fire in Me"	John Newman, David “Dehiro” Mørup^{[c]}
2018	Friendly Fires	Inflorescent	"Love Like Waves"	Friendly Fires^{[c]}
2018	Plan B	HBAHBL	"Grateful"	Plan B, Dom Search, Show N Prove, New Machine^{[a]}
2018	Daniel Avery	Song for Alpha	"Glitter"	Daniel Avery
2018	Tinashe	Joyride	"Fires and Flames"	Joel Compass, Amanda Ghost
2018	Sofi Tukker	Treehouse	"Benadryl"	Sofi Tukker, Jon Hume
2018	Lowes	Elements EP	"Here We Are"	Luke Paget
2018	Lowes	Elements EP	"If You Leave Me Now"	Luke Paget
2018	Clean Bandit	What Is Love?	"Solo" feat. Demi Lovato	Jack Patterson, Grace Chatto, Fred Again
2018	Dan Caplen	Non-album single	"Trouble" feat. Ms. Banks	Siba
2018	Jax Jones	Snacks (Supersize)	"Ring Ring" feat. Mabel and Rich the Kid	Jax Jones
2018	Raye	Non-album single	"Friends"	Valley Girl, Fred Again
2018	Years & Years	Palo Santo	"Hallelujah"	Greg Kurstin
2018	Years & Years	Palo Santo	"Hypnotised"	No additional producers
2018	Years & Years	Palo Santo	"Rendezvous"	Years & Years
2018	Years & Years	Palo Santo	"Howl"	No additional producers
2018	Years & Years	Palo Santo	"Coyote"	No additional producers
2018	Gorgon City	Escape	"One Last Song" feat. JP Cooper and Yungen	Gorgon City
2018	Lowes	Elements EP	"Searching"	Luke Paget
2018	Gorgon City	Escape	"Kingdom" feat. Raphaella	Gorgon City
2018	Jess Glynne	Always In Between	"All I Am"	No additional producers
2018	Alice Chater	Non-album single	"Hourglass"	No additional producers
2018	Friendly Fires	Inflorescent	"Heaven Let Me In"	Friendly Fires, Disclosure, Alex Metric^{[a]}, Hal Ritson^{[a]}, Richard Adlam^{[a]}
2018	Gryffin	Gravity	"Remember" with Zohara	Gryffin, Trackside^{[c]}
2018	Georgia	Seeking Thrills	"Started Out"	Georgia, Sean Oakley
2018	Clean Bandit	What Is Love?	"Baby" feat. Marina and Luis Fonsi	Jack Patterson, Grace Chatto
2018	Jax Jones	Snacks (Supersize)	"Play" with Years & Years	Jax Jones
2018	Clean Bandit	What Is Love?	"Out at Night" feat. Kyle and Big Boi	Jack Patterson, Grace Chatto
2018	Clean Bandit	What Is Love?	"Playboy Style" feat. Charli XCX and Bhad Bhabie	Jack Patterson, Grace Chatto, The Invisible Men, Saltwives
2018	Clean Bandit	What Is Love?	"Mama" feat. Ellie Goulding	Jack Patterson, Grace Chatto
2018	Clean Bandit	What Is Love?	"Should've Known Better" feat. Anne-Marie	Jack Patterson, Grace Chatto, Romans
2018	Clean Bandit	What Is Love?	"Last Goodbye" feat. Tove Styrke and Stefflon Don	Jack Patterson, Grace Chatto, Ilya
2018	Clean Bandit	What Is Love?	"We Were Just Kids" feat. Craig David and Kirsten Joy	Jack Patterson, Grace Chatto
2018	Clean Bandit	What Is Love?	"Nowhere" feat. Rita Ora and Kyle	Jack Patterson, Grace Chatto, Lotus IV
2018	Clean Bandit	What Is Love?	"In Us I Believe" feat. Alma	Jack Patterson, Grace Chatto
2018	Clean Bandit	What Is Love?	"24 Hours" feat. Yasmin Green	Jack Patterson, Julian Bunetta, John Ryan
2018	Clean Bandit	What Is Love?	"Beautiful" feat. Davido and Love Ssega	Jack Patterson, Grace Chatto
2019	Tom Walker	What a Time to Be Alive	"Just You and I"	Jonathan Quarmby
2019	Ea Kaya	Fragile But Strong as Hell	"Don't Complicate It"	Ulrik Schultz
2019	Friendly Fires	Inflorescent	"Lack of Love"	Friendly Fires
2019	The Magician	Non-album single	"Ready to Love"	The Magician
2019	Becky Hill	Get to Know	"I Could Get Used to This" with Weiss	Weiss^{[a]}, Mike Kintish^{[v]}, MNEK^{[v]}
2019	Jax Jones	Snacks (Supersize)	"All Day and Night" with Martin Solveig and Madison Beer	Jax Jones, Martin Solveig
2019	Georgia	Seeking Thrills	"About Work the Dancefloor"	Georgia, Sean Oakley
2019	Marina	Love + Fear	"Karma"	Jack Patterson
2019	Aurora	A Different Kind of Human	"The River"	Aurora, Magnus Skylstad, Odd Martin^{[c]}
2019	Jax Jones	Snacks (Supersize)	"One Touch" with Jess Glynne	Jax Jones
2019	Friendly Fires	Inflorescent	"Silhouettes"	James Ford
2019	Louise	Heavy Love	"Lead Me On"	Jack Patterson, Freedo
2019	End of the World	Non-album single	"Lost" feat. Clean Bandit	Jack Patterson, Grace Chatto, Cass Lowe
2019	Alice Chater	Non-album single	"Tonight"	Martin Terefe
2019	Rudimental	Distinction EP	"Something About You" with Elderbrook	Elderbrook, Andy Sheldrake, Rudimental, Commands
2019	Friendly Fires	Inflorescent	"Offline" with Friend Within	No additional producers
2019	Friendly Fires	Inflorescent	"Can't Wait Forever"	No additional producers
2019	Friendly Fires	Inflorescent	"Sleeptalking"	No additional producers
2019	Friendly Fires	Inflorescent	"Kiss and Rewind"	No additional producers
2019	Friendly Fires	Inflorescent	"Cry Wolf"	No additional producers
2019	Friendly Fires	Inflorescent	"Almost Midnight"	No additional producers
2019	Disciples	Non-album single	"All Mine" with Eyelar	Disciples, Kiris Houston, Nick Sheldon^{[a]}
2019	Jax Jones	Snacks (Supersize)	"Jacques" with Tove Lo	Jax Jones
2019	Jax Jones	Snacks (Supersize)	"100 Times"	Jax Jones
2019	Jax Jones	Snacks (Supersize)	"Cruel"	Jax Jones
2019	Jax Jones	Snacks (Supersize)	"All 4 U"	Jax Jones, Secondcity^{[a]}, Tieks^{[a]}
2019	Jax Jones	Snacks (Supersize)	"This Is Real" with Ella Henderson	Jax Jones, Tommy Forest^{[a]}
2019	Jax Jones	Snacks (Supersize)	"Tequila Time (Outro)"	Jax Jones
2019	Emily Burns	My Town EP	"My Town"	No additional producers
2019	Georgia	Seeking Thrills	"Never Let You Go"	Georgia, Sean Oakley
2019	Tom Walker	What a Time to Be Alive	"Better Half of Me"	Cam Blackwood
2019	Gryffin	Gravity	"Body Back" feat. Maia Wright	Gryffin, Mitch Allan^{[c]}
2020	Georgia	Seeking Thrills	"24 Hours"	Georgia, Sean Oakley
2020	Georgia	Seeking Thrills	"Till I Own It"	Georgia, Sean Oakley
2020	Georgia	Seeking Thrills	"I Can't Wait"	Georgia, Sean Oakley
2020	Georgia	Seeking Thrills	"Feel It"	Georgia, Sean Oakley
2020	Georgia	Seeking Thrills	"Ray Guns"	Georgia, Sean Oakley
2020	Georgia	Seeking Thrills	"The Thrill" feat. Maurice	Georgia
2020	Ella Eyre	Non-album single	"New Me"	LostBoy
2020	Tom Grennan	Evering Road	"This Is the Place"	Richard Boardman, Daniel Boyle, David Straaf
2020	Galantis	Church	"Hurricane" with John Newman	Bloodshy, Bali Bandits, John Newman^{[c]}
2020	Jax Jones	Non-album single	"Tequila" with Martin Solveig and Raye	Jax Jones, Martin Solveig^{[a]}, Alex Tepper^{[a]}
2020	Declan J Donovan	Non-album single	"Fighting with Myself"	No additional producers
2020	Daniel Blume	Non-album single	"Catch Feelings"	Daniel Blume
2020	Lindsay Lohan	TBA	"Back to Me"	No additional producers
2020	Four of Diamonds	Non-album single	"The Writer" feat. Mr Eazi	Jonas Blue
2020	Clean Bandit	TBA	"Tick Tock" with Mabel feat. 24kGoldn	Jack Patterson, Grace Chatto
2020	220 Kid	Non-album single	"Too Many Nights" with JC Stewart	220 Kid, Joe Janiak
2020	Becky Hill	TBA	"Space"	CamelPhat, Ryan Ashley^{[v]}
2020	Jax Jones	Non-album single	"I Miss U" with Au/Ra	Jax Jones, Tom Demac, Cass Lowe^{[c]}, Alex Tepper^{[c]}
2020	Raye	Euphoric Sad Songs	"Regardless" with Rudimental	Rudimental, Punctual
2020	Emily Burns	Non-album single	"Is It Just Me?" with JP Cooper	Cameron Poole^{[v]}
2020	Solardo	Non-album single	"Enough" with Rowetta	Solardo, Mark Foster
2020	Georgia	Seeking Thrills	"Running Up That Hill"	Georgia
2021	Years & Years	Non-album single	"It's a Sin"	No additional producers
2021	Clean Bandit	TBA	"Higher" feat. Iann Dior	Jack Patterson, Grace Chatto
2021	Punctual	Non-album single	"The Step" with Nabiha	Punctual
2021	Rebecca Ferguson	Non-album single	"No Words Needed" feat. Nile Rodgers	Nile Rodgers, Russell Graham
2021	Tom Grennan	Evering Road	"Never Be a Right Time"	No additional producers
2021	Rudimental	Ground Control	"Be Somebody" with James Vincent McMorrow	Rudimental, Future Cut
2021	Becky Hill	TBA	"Last Time"	LostBoy
2021	Years & Years	TBA	"Starstruck"	Nathaniel Ledwidge, Clarence Coffee Jr.^{[v]}
2021	Gracey	Non-album single	"Got You Covered" with Billen Ted	Billen Ted, Saltwives
2021	Jack Savoretti	Europiana	"Who's Hurting Who" feat. Nile Rodgers	Nile Rodgers
2021	Georgia	Non-album single	"Get Me Higher" with David Jackson	Georgia, David Jackson
2021	Years & Years	Born This Way	"The Edge of Glory"	No additional producers
