= Kolter (DJ) =

German DJ and record producer

- Also known as: DJOKO
- Born: Johannes Kolter
- Origin: Cologne, Germany
- Genres: House; minimal; breakbeat; UK garage
- Occupations: DJ; record producer; label owner
- Years active: 2016–present
- Labels: Koltrax; Hoove; Berg Audio; Hot Creations; PIV; Shall Not Fade

Johannes Kolter, known professionally as Kolter and previously as DJOKO, is a German DJ and record producer based in Cologne. He is known for house music and breakbeat-influenced productions, and is the founder of the record label Koltrax and a co-founder of the label Hoove. His 2026 single "Trapped" reached number 48 on the UK Singles Chart.

== Career ==
=== Early releases as DJOKO (2016–2022) ===
Kolter began releasing music in 2016 under the alias DJOKO, a contraction of his first and last names, debuting with the EP Solace Rhythm in collaboration with Luca Secco. His early output moved from a retro-leaning sound toward a minimal house style, and he released on labels including PIV, Shall Not Fade and Berg Audio.

He introduced the Kolter name as a secondary alias for more breakbeat-oriented material, first appearing on the Doppelleben EP for Talman Records, and in March 2021 delivered Went Too Far, the inaugural release on the label PILOT, a record spanning UK garage and breakbeat.

He has worked repeatedly with the Dutch producer Chris Stussy, remixing Stussy's "Seeing & Believing" for the 2020 Across Ocean EP on PIV Records and releasing collaborative material with him under the Stussko alias.

Between 2020 and 2022 he released the Endless Explorations series on Berg Audio; the third instalment, issued in 2022, was his first full-length album.

=== Rebrand to Kolter (2023–present) ===
At the end of 2022 Kolter announced that he would perform and release music solely under the Kolter name, retiring the DJOKO alias. He has said the change was intended to avoid confusion with other artists and to attach his own surname to his work; the decision followed a cease-and-desist letter concerning the former alias. Alongside the rebrand he launched the label Koltrax, replacing his earlier self-release imprint.

Subsequent releases have appeared on labels including Aus Music, PIV and Solid Grooves, and in November 2024 he made his debut on Jamie Jones's Hot Creations label with the Red Alert EP. His collaboration with Luuk van Dijk, "Good 4 U", was released on Three Six Zero.

As a DJ he has performed at venues and festivals including Rex Club in Paris, DC-10 in Ibiza, Shelter in Amsterdam and Tomorrowland.

== Reception and commercial performance ==
Kolter's 2026 single "Trapped", released on his own Koltrax label, became his first entry on the UK Singles Chart, debuting at number 88 in July 2026 and peaking at number 48. The track also reached number 10 on the Official Dance Singles Chart, number 8 on the Official Independent Singles Chart and number 1 on the Official Independent Singles Breakers Chart, and peaked at number 16 on the Irish Singles Chart.

Another single, "Hey Everybody (Back in the Dance)", followed on 17 July 2026 and marked his first release for Positiva Records, the dance imprint of EMI and Universal. It entered the UK Singles Chart at number 77 in August 2026 and peaked at number 70, spending four weeks on the chart; it also reached number 20 on the Official Dance Singles Chart and number 10 on both the Official Singles Sales Chart and the Official Singles Downloads Chart.

Earlier in his career, Mixmag Brasil reported that he was drawing roughly 250,000 monthly listeners on Spotify around the time of his 2022 rebrand. By August 2026 that figure had risen to more than 4.3 million. Tracks of his have received support on BBC Radio 1, including "15 Seconds Of Fame".

== Musical style ==
Kolter's productions span classic house, minimal, electro and breakbeat, and he has described the bassline as the element he builds a track around. His DJ sets have been characterised as genre-blending.

== Labels ==
- Hoove – co-founded with several collaborators.
- Koltrax – founded 2023 as an outlet for his own material.

== Selected discography ==
=== Albums ===
- Endless Explorations Pt. 3 (2022, Berg Audio)

=== Singles ===
List of charting singles, with selected chart positions
Title	Year	Peak chart positions							Album
Title	Year	UK	UK Dance	UK Indie	UK Indie Breakers	IRE	MKD Air.	US Dance Air.	Album
"Trapped"	2026	48	10	8	1	16	—	—	What Did You Come For?
"Hey Everybody (Back in the Dance)"	2026	29	10	—	—	—	15	18	Non-album single
"—" denotes a release that did not chart or was not eligible for that chart.

=== Selected EPs ===
- Went Too Far (2021, PILOT)
- Koltrax DLC #01 (2023, Koltrax)
- Red Alert (2024, Hot Creations)
- Let's Pardey (2025)
- Who You Talking To? (2025)
- Back 2 the Beat (2026)
- What Did You Come For? (2026, Koltrax)

=== Selected remixes ===
- Chris Stussy – "Seeing & Believing" (Kolter Remix), from the Across Ocean EP (2020, PIV Records)
- Jamie Jones – "Murder Mystery" (Kolter Remix) (2026, Hot Creations)
