= Different Sides of the Sun =

Studio album by Hot Natured
- Released: 30 August 2013
- Recorded: 2011–13
- Genre: Deep house; house; electronic
- Length: 74:19
- Label: Warner Music Group; Hot Creations
- Producer: Jamie Jones; Lee Foss; Luca C; Mark Ralph; Marc Kinchen

Singles from Different Sides of the Sun
- 1. "Forward Motion" Released: 21 March 2012; 2. "Reverse Skydiving" Released: 25 April 2013; 3. "Isis (Magic Carpet Ride)" Released: 7 August 2013; 4. "Benediction" Released: 25 June 2014

Professional ratings
Review scores
| Source | Rating |
|---|---|
| Drowned in Sound | 6/10 |
| The Irish Times | 4/5 stars |
| NME | 3/5 stars |

Different Sides of the Sun is the debut studio album by British-American electronic music group Hot Natured. It was released in August 2013, through the Warner Music Group and their own label Hot Creations. It features Ali Love, Anabel Englund, Róisín Murphy, The Egyptian Lover, Kenny Glasgow and S.Y.F.

== Singles ==
- "Forward Motion" (featuring Ali Love) was the first single released from the album and features vocals from Ali Love, who was eventually chosen to become the lead vocalist for the band, joining James Jones and Lee Foss. The song was originally released on 21 March 2012 as an extended mix on YouTube.
- "Benediction" was the second single. Like the previous single, it was originally uploaded in 2012 as an extended mix as a collaboration with Ali Love, however, on 25 June 2014, it was officially released after Love was credited as the lead vocalist of the band. It peaked at number forty on the Official UK Singles Chart.
- "Reverse Skydiving" (featuring Anabel Englund) was the third single. It was also the first song by Hot Natured to have a music video made for it. It features vocals from Anabel Englund, who was also set up to be a co-writing member of the band. The track peaked at number fifty-six on the Official UK Singles Chart.
- "Isis (Magic Carpet Ride)" (featuring The Egyptian Lover) was the fourth single to be released from the album. It features vocals from rapper and spoken lyricist The Egyptian Lover.

== Critical reception ==
NME wrote that "weak songwriting makes for an ok album, but not much more."

== Track listing ==
| No. | Title | Writer(s) | Length |
|---|---|---|---|
| 1. | "Operate" (featuring Kenny Glasgow) | Luca Cazal; Lee Foss; Kenny Glasgow; Jamie Jones | 4:07 |
| 2. | "Isis" (featuring The Egyptian Lover) | Cazal; Foss; Jones; Alexander Williams; Greg Broussard; Mark Ralph | 6:32 |
| 3. | "Reverse Skydiving" (featuring Anabel Englund) | Cazal; Anabel Englund; Foss; Jones; Williams | 5:29 |
| 4. | "Different Sides" | Cazal; Foss; Jones; Williams | 4:24 |
| 5. | "Benediction" | Cazal; Foss; Jones; Williams | 6:39 |
| 6. | "Forward Motion" | Foss; Jones; Williams | 5:19 |
| 7. | "People Change" (featuring S.Y.F) | Cazal; Foss; Cedric Gasaida; Jones; Williams | 4:00 |
| 8. | "Take You There" | Foss; Jones; Williams; Ralph | 5:16 |
| 9. | "Planet Us" | Cazal; Foss; Jones; Williams | 6:17 |
| 10. | "Tightrope" | Cazal; Englund; Foss; Jones; Williams; Ralph | 3:53 |
| 11. | "Mercury Rising" (featuring Anabel Englund) | Cazal; Englund; Foss; Jones; Williams; Ralph | 5:23 |
| 12. | "Alternate State" (featuring Róisín Murphy) | Cazal; Foss; Jones; Williams; Róisín Marie Murphy; Ralph | 4:06 |
| 13. | "Detroit" | Foss; Jones; Marc Kinchen; Williams | 4:26 |
| 14. | "Physical Control" | Foss; Jones; Williams; Ralph | 5:11 |
| 15. | "Emerald City" (featuring Anabel Englund) | Englund; Foss; Jones; Williams | 3:17 |
| Total length: | | | 74:19 |

== Charts ==
| Chart (2013) | Peak position |
|---|---|
| Scottish Albums (OCC) | 66 |
| UK Albums (OCC) | 44 |
| UK Dance Albums (OCC) | 5 |
| US Dance/Electronic Albums (Billboard) | 25 |
