= Look Right Through =

Single by Storm Queen
- Released: October 19, 2010
- Recorded: 2010
- Genre: Deep house; funk
- Length: 7:29 (original mix); 2:28 (MK remix)
- Label: Environ; Defected; Ministry of Sound; Ultra
- Songwriter: Morgan Geist
- Producers: Storm Queen; MK (remixer)

Storm Queen singles chronology
"Look Right Through" (2010)	"It Goes On" (2011)
Let's Make Mistakes (2012)	Look Right Through (MK Remix) (2013)

MK singles chronology
"Electricity" (2012)	"Look Right Through (MK Remix)" (2013)	"Always (Route 94 Remix)" (2014)

"Look Right Through" is a song by American record producer Storm Queen, vocals by Damon C. Scott. It was first released on October 19, 2010, with two remix packages released through Defected in February 2012. On November 3, 2013, Ministry of Sound re-released the song in Ireland and Britain including new remixes. The vocal remix by MK was hugely successful in the United Kingdom, and helped the track enter at number one on the UK Singles Chart and UK Dance Chart simultaneously on November 10, 2013.

== Music video ==
The video for the original track was released on December 20, 2011. A music video to accompany the release of the MK remix was first released onto YouTube on September 23, 2013, with a total length of three minutes and eleven seconds. Set in the 1920s, it shows an eyepatch-wearing man dressed as a white lion in a suit. After leaving his hotel room, he dances to get attention from women. The video was filmed at The Cadogan Hotel, located in Sloane Street, Knightsbridge, London.

== Critical reception ==
Robert Copsey of Digital Spy gave the song a positive review stating:

"It's the musical fairytale of the digital age: A dance track is popular on the underground, becomes the go-to song on Europe's party islands, turns into an online hit and is eventually re-worked for radio stations, which launches it into the upper echelons of the top 40. The latest to undergo a chart-friendly makeover is 'Look Right Through', which comes courtesy of US DJ and one half of house duo Metro Arena Morgan Geist, who has aptly named himself Storm Queen for the occasion. In this case, Geist's fairy godmother (are you keeping up?) is Mark 'MK' Kinchen, who has re-swizzed the track alongside a full vocal courtesy of Damon C Scott – the knight in shining armour, if you will (we'll stop that now). "Seven long years of moving through the streets, letting people in/ But they don't talk to me, they look right through" he sings over a bobbing house line, finger-snapping beats and a looping chorus that quickly lodges deep in the brain. The result, like all fairytales, already sounds like a classic."

== Track listings ==
Digital download – 2010 single
No.	Title	Length
1.	"Look Right Through" (Vocal Mix)	7:29
2.	"Look Right Through" (Dub)	7:15

Look Right Through (Part 1) (Remixes)
No.	Title	Length
1.	"Look Right Through" (Dimitri from Paris Erodiscomix)	7:01
2.	"Look Right Through" (Jamie Jones Remix)	6:14
3.	"Look Right Through" (Aeroplane Remix)	5:13

Look Right Through (Part 2) (Remixes)
No.	Title	Length
1.	"Look Right Through" (Art Department Remix)	6:59
2.	"Look Right Through" (MK 'Don't Talk to Me' Dub)	7:55
3.	"Look Right Through" (MK 'Morning' Vocal Mix)	6:08
4.	"Look Right Through" (Dub)	7:15

Digital download – 2013 single
No.	Title	Length
1.	"Look Right Through" (MK Remix)	2:28

Digital download – 2013 EP
No.	Title	Length
1.	"Look Right Through" (MK Dub III)	5:52
2.	"Look Right Through" (Route 94 'Sun Comes Up' Remix)	6:34
3.	"Look Right Through" (Lil Silva Remix)	4:59
4.	"Look Right Through" (Danny Howard Remix)	5:34
5.	"Look Right Through" (Brookes Brothers Remix)	4:20
6.	"Look Right Through" (Vocal Mix)	7:29

== Charts and certifications ==
=== Weekly charts ===
Chart (2013)	Peak position
Belgium (Ultratop 50 Flanders)	21
Belgium (Ultratop Flanders Dance)	1
Belgium (Ultratop 50 Wallonia)	47
Belgium (Ultratop Wallonia Dance)	7
Denmark (Tracklisten)	28
Euro Digital Songs (Billboard)	2
Ireland (IRMA)	20
Netherlands (Single Top 100)	54
Poland Dance (ZPAV)	27
Scottish Singles Sales (Official Charts)	3
UK Singles (Official Charts)	1
UK Dance (Official Charts)	1
UK Indie (Official Charts)	1

=== Year-end charts ===
Chart (2013)	Position
UK Singles (Official Charts Company)	62

=== Certifications ===
Region	Certification	Certified units/sales
United Kingdom (BPI)	Platinum	600,000^{‡}
^{‡} Sales+streaming figures based on certification alone.

== Release history ==
Region	Date	Version	Format	Label
United States	19 October 2010	Original version	Digital download	Environ
United States	1 February 2012	Remix Package (Part 1)	Digital download	Defected
United States	29 February 2012	Remix Package (Part 2)	Digital download	Defected
United Kingdom	3 November 2013	MK Remix	Digital download	Ministry of Sound
