= Love Music =

Love Music may refer to:

- Love Music (Ali Love album)
- Love Music (Sérgio Mendes album)
