= Lee Foss =

American record producer & DJ

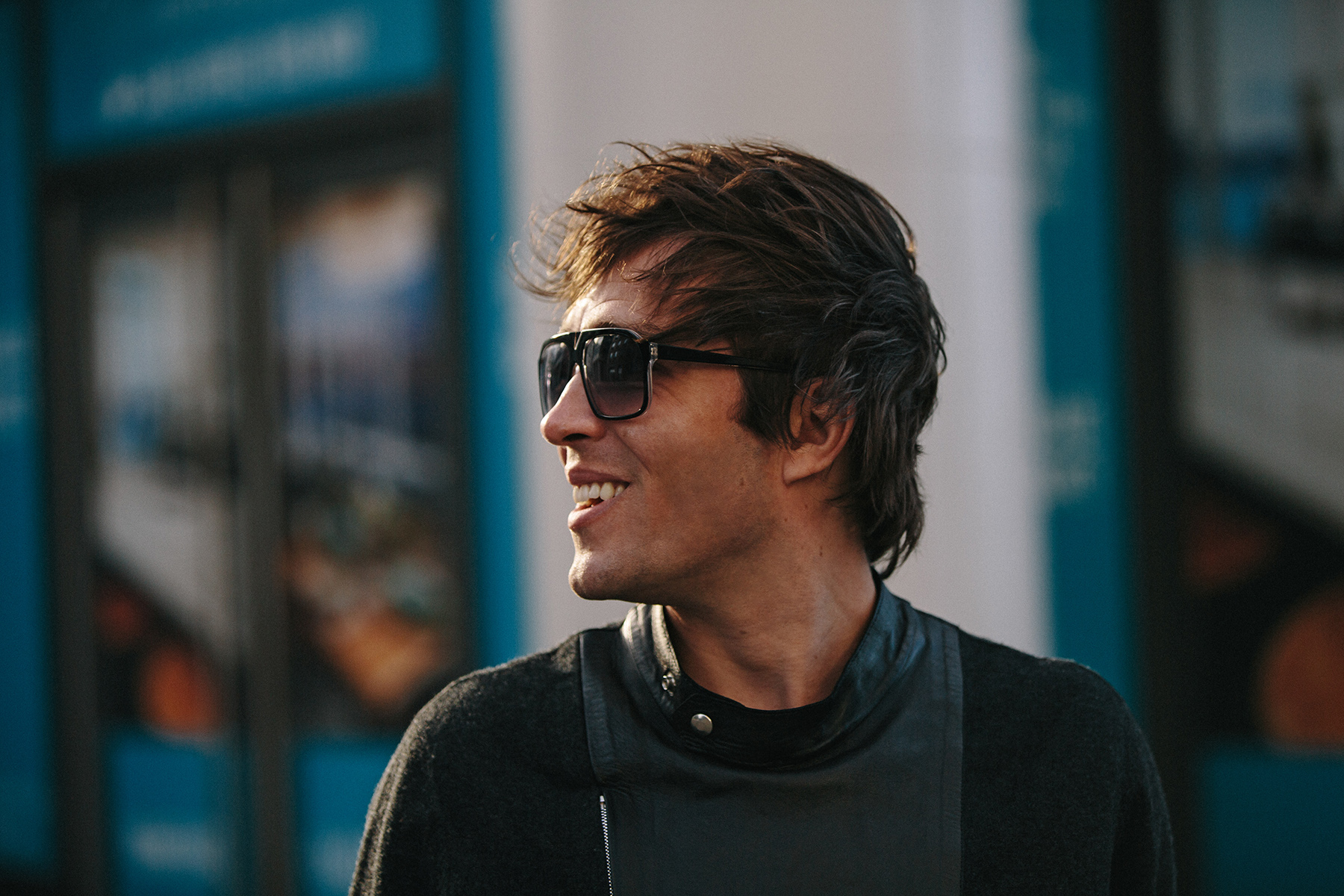

Background information
- Also known as: Hot Natured (With Jamie Jones, Ali Love, Luca C)
- Born: Lee Foss; DeKalb, Illinois, U.S.
- Genres: House, deep house, techno
- Occupations: Producer; DJ
- Years active: 2001–present
- Labels: Hot Creations; Wolf + Lamb; Culprit; Mexa; No. 19; Repopulate Mars

Lee Foss is a record producer and DJ from DeKalb, Illinois. In addition to a number of releases on labels such as Culprit, Wolf+Lamb and No. 19, he co-founded the dance music label Hot Creations and is a member of the house music band Hot Natured alongside Jamie Jones, Ali Love and Luca C. He is also the founder of tech house record label, Repopulate Mars, and its sublabel, South of Saturn.

Foss's music is inspired by the musical heritage of Chicago and his influences include classic house, R&B, 90s Hip Hop, 1980s electro and Detroit techno.

In 2010, Foss was the highest new entry into the Resident Advisor Top 100 DJ poll at no. 38, and climbed to no. 11 in 2011.

== Career ==
While growing up in DeKalb, Foss went to a lot of clubs and raves in Chicago in the 1990s, which sparked his interest in house and disco. “I was making music for years on my own in Chicago in Logic and not really getting very far”, he says, “Except for when I would do edits which I would send to my friends who were bigger DJs and they would love [them]”.

Foss claims that it was after meeting Jamie Jones in Ibiza in the early 2000s that changed his whole approach to music and laid the foundations for his later career. The pair quickly became close friends, paving the way for their Hot Creations label partnership with Richy Ahmed and later their Hot Natured band project with Infinity Ink (Ali Love and Luca C), as well as their Paradise event brand.

=== DJ ===
Foss has made his name on both sides of the Atlantic, playing at clubs like fabric (London), Warung (Brazil), The Warehouse Project (Manchester), The Standard Rooftop (Los Angeles), Watergate (Berlin) and Spybar (Chicago).

Foss's rise to prominence as a DJ has been driven by his diverse sets, spanning from nu-school house and synth-heavy techno, and backed up by a string of releases on labels such as No. 19, Culprit, Wolf+Lamb and his own Hot Creations.

=== Producer ===
In addition to his solo releases, Foss has teamed up with veteran producer MK for his Electricity EP release on Hot Creations featuring Anabel Englund, which was named as Pete Tong’s Essential New Tune.

Foss is also a member of the house music group Hot Natured. The group released their debut album Different Sides of The Sun on Hot Creations in 2013. The same year they also staged a world tour of the Hot Natured live show, performing headlining slots at Glastonbury, Sónar and Bestival.

=== Hot Creations ===
Hot Creations is a house music label jointly founded by Foss and Jamie Jones. The label has seen releases from Robert James, PBR Streetgang, Danny Daze, Alexis Raphael, Waifs & Strays, Miguel Campbell and Richy Ahmed.

== Discography ==
=== Albums ===
- 2013: Hot Natured - Different Sides Of The Sun [Hot Creations / Warner Bros.]
- 2017: Alchemy [Emerald City Music]

=== Solo EPs ===
- 2009: The Edge EP [Culprit]
- 2009: Significant Others Too (Wolf+Lamb Records)
- 2010: U Got Me EP [Hot Creations]
- 2011: Starfruit EP [Hot Creations]
- 2011: Your Turn Girl [Culprit]
- 2012: Masta Blasta EP [Mexa]

=== Collaborative EPs ===
- 2009: Hot Natured - H.E.A.D.S EP [Culprit]
- 2009: Hot Natured - Hot Natured Edits [W+L Black]
- 2010: Hot Natured - Equilibrium EP [Culprit]
- 2011: Pteradactyl Disco - Big Ass Biscuit [Hot Creations]
- 2011: Hot Natured - Forward Motion [Hot Creations]
- 2012: Lee Foss & MK - Electricity EP [Hot Creations]
- 2012: Hot Natured - Benediction [Hot Creations]
- 2013: Hot Natured - Reverse Skydiving [FFRR]
- 2013: Hot Natured - Magic Carpet Ride [FFRR]

=== Singles ===
- 2019: "Lies, Deception, and Fantasy" (with Chris Lake)
- 2020: "Only The Gods" (with Disciples featuring Anabel Englund)
- 2020: "Gravity" (with Martin Ikin featuring Hayley May)
- 2021: "Name of Love" (with Franky Wah featuring Spncr)
