= Can't Believe It (Flo Rida song) =

Single by Flo Rida featuring Pitbull
- Released: July 29, 2013
- Recorded: 2013
- Genre: Hip hop; dance
- Length: 3:44
- Label: Atlantic
- Songwriters: Tramar Dillard; Armando Pérez; Mike Caren; Luca Ciampi; Breyan Isaac; William Lobban-Bean; Alexander Williams
- Producers: Cook Classics; Mike Caren

Flo Rida singles chronology
"Let It Roll" (2013)	"Can't Believe It" (2013)	"How I Feel" (2013)

Pitbull singles chronology
"Exotic" (2013)	"Can't Believe It" (2013)	"Sopa de Caracol - Yupi" (2013)

Music video
- "Can't Believe It" on YouTube

"Can't Believe It" is a song by American rapper Flo Rida. The song features a rap verse from Cuban-American rapper Pitbull. The song samples "Infinity" by London-based duo Infinity Ink.

== Music Video ==
The music video for "Can't Believe It" was directed by Geremey and Georgie Legs and uploaded to YouTube on July 28, 2013. It shows both Flo Rida and Pitbull on a beach setting with various women twerking and showing off their butts in different effects like the mirror effect or fisheye lens. Some of the girls wear bikinis, lingerie, or a clothing pair of midriff tops and denim hot pants with the latter showing the patch from the single cover on the back pockets. It also shows a CGI model of Flo Rida’s head as a gold chain necklace.

== Critical reception ==
Drew Millard of Vice commented that "This song is so insanely shitty that it reaches the sublimation point, flowing freely between good and bad to the point where it becomes absolutely perfect."

== Chart performance ==
=== Weekly charts ===
Weekly chart performance
Chart (2013–14)	Peak position
Australia (ARIA)	7
Austria (Ö3 Austria Top 40)	16
Belgium (Ultratip Bubbling Under Flanders)	20
Belgium (Ultratip Bubbling Under Wallonia)	17
Denmark (Tracklisten)	16
France (SNEP)	92
Germany (GfK)	4
Hungary (Dance Top 40)	15
Hungary (Rádiós Top 40)	19
Ireland (IRMA)	19
Italy (FIMI)	100
New Zealand (Recorded Music NZ)	36
Poland Dance (ZPAV)	30
Russia Airplay (TopHit)	11
Slovakia Airplay (ČNS IFPI)	28
Switzerland (Schweizer Hitparade)	19
Ukraine Airplay (TopHit)	48
US Bubbling Under Hot 100 (Billboard)	2
US Bubbling Under R&B/Hip-Hop Singles (Billboard)	2
US Hot Rap Songs (Billboard)	25
US Pop Airplay (Billboard)	37

=== Year-end charts ===
Annual chart rankings
Chart (2013)	Position
Australia (ARIA)	76
Germany (Media Control AG)	99
Hungary (Dance Top 40)	71
Russia Airplay (TopHit)	107
Chart (2014)	Position
Hungary (Dance Top 40)	47

== Certifications ==
Certifications and sales
Region	Certification	Certified units/sales
Australia (ARIA)	Gold	35,000^{^}
Streaming
Denmark (IFPI Danmark)	Platinum	1,800,000^{†}
^{^} Shipments figures based on certification alone.^{†} Streaming-only figures based on certification alone.
