= Infinity Ink =

London-based vocal/music production/DJ duo

- Origin: London, England
- Genre: House
- Years active: 2011–present
- Labels: Hot Creations, Crosstown Rebels, Different Recordings, Cooltempo
- Members: Luca Cazal; Ali Love

Infinity Ink is a London-based vocal/music production/DJ duo made up of Italian Luca Cazal and British Ali Love. They have released music through Hot Creations, Crosstown Rebels and, most recently, Cooltempo.

== Early career ==
Originally they formed the duo The Benedictions, playing 1960s and 1970s folk rock-inspired music on acoustic guitar. The name of the duo Infinity Ink came when the duo were playing in Moldova on their tour. They noticed a nearby factory that was called 'Infinity Inc'. So they adopted the name changing the "c" to a "k", giving it a completely new twist. Infinity Ink found fame through two tracks released in 2012. First was "Games" on the Hot Creations label followed by the single "Infinity" on Crosstown Rebels. Infinity was sampled by "Flo Rida" in his 2013 single "Can't Believe It". The same year, the duo secured a residency for Jamie Jones paradise party at DC10 in Ibiza, a slot that they still play to this day.

== Hot Natured ==
Luca Cazal and Ali Love later joined Jamie Jones and Lee Foss to form the live act Hot Natured, who along with Anabel Englund released a string of hits including "Benediction" and "Reverse Skydiving". They sold out their debut gig live at Brixton Academy and were the first electronic music act to do so since Leftfield in 1996. Their debut album Different Sides of the Sun was released in 2013 via Warner Bros. Records and Hot Creations. Singles "Benediction" and "Reverse Skydiving" both charted with the former reaching number 40 on the UK Singles Chart and the latter reaching number 56.

== Live shows ==
In 2016, Infinity Ink launched their live show, debuting at 'Elrow Presents Hot Creations' at The Rainbow Venues in Birmingham. The performance incorporated live vocals from Ali Love whilst Luca programmed the drum machines and DJs. The performance at The Rainbow Venues was the start of a full tour spanning the summer festival season.

== Present day ==
Infinity Ink originally signed to Different Recordings, the electronic imprint of PIAS, for their debut album but instead released four singles with them before parting ways. 2019 has seen the pair sign to Cooltempo, the recently revived dance label owned by Chrysalis Records with plans to release the debut album originally planned for 2016.

"Rushing Back" is the first single from the album and features vocals from singer/songwriter and Rinse FM host, Yasmin.

== Discography ==
=== Singles ===
- 2011: "Games"
- 2012: "Infinity"
- 2016: "The Rush" (with Mr.V)
- 2016: "House of Infinity"
- 2016: "Too strong"
- 2016: "Full Capacity"
- 2016: "How Do I Love You" (with Yasmin)
- 2016: "Till the Light " (with Lee Foss)
- 2017: "Alienation"
- 2019: "Don't Give Up"
- 2019: "Tomorrow Never Comes"
- 2019: "Rushing Back" (with Yasmin)

=== Albums ===
- 2019: House of Infinity
- 2019: The Remixes

=== Music videos ===
- 2012: "Infinity"
- 2012: "Infinity (Skream's 99 Remix)"
- 2016: "Full Capacity"
- 2019: "Rushing Back" (with Yasmin)
