= Morgan Geist =

- Also known as: Storm Queen
- Born: November 5, 1972 (age 53); Wayne, New Jersey, U.S.
- Occupations: DJ; producer
- Years active: 1994–present
- Labels: Environ; Ministry of Sound

Morgan Geist (born November 5, 1972) is an American music songwriter, producer, mix engineer and DJ from Wayne, New Jersey. Among mainstream music consumers, he is best known for his UK number-one song "Look Right Through", recorded under the alias Storm Queen and remixed by Marc Kinchen. Geist is also half of the duo Metro Area. He has also remixed many artists, among them Caribou, Tracey Thorne, The Rapture, Franz Ferdinand, and Telex.

== Music career ==
=== 2010–present: Breakthrough ===
In 2010, Storm Queen released his debut single "Look Right Through" on Geist's own Environ label. In 2011, the follow-up "It Goes On" was released. In July 2012 he released "Let's Make Mistakes" as his third single. On November 3, 2013, a licensed version of the single "Look Right Through" was released via Defected Records/Ministry of Sound. In the United Kingdom, the song entered at the top of the UK Singles Chart on November 10, 2013, becoming Storm Queen's first number one song in The UK, dethroning Eminem and Rihanna's "The Monster" from the top of the chart. In Ireland, the song entered at number thirty on the Irish Singles Chart on November 8, 2013, and peaked at number twenty.

== Discography ==
=== Studio albums ===
- The Driving Memoirs (as Morgan Geist, 1997)
- Morgan Geist presents Environ: Into A Separate Space (1998)
- Double Night Time (as Morgan Geist, 2008)

=== Collaborations ===
- Metro Area (with Darshan Jesrani, 1998)
- The Galleria (with Jessy Lanza, 2015)
- Au Suisse (with Kelley Polar, 2022)

=== Singles ===
Year	Title	Peak chart positions						Album
Year	Title	BEL (Fl)	BEL (Wa)	DEN	IRE	NL	UK	Album
2010	"Look Right Through"	—	—	—	—	—	—	Non-album singles
2011	"It Goes On"	—	—	—	—	—	—	Non-album singles
2012	"Let's Make Mistakes"	—	—	—	—	—	—	Non-album singles
2013	"Look Right Through" (MK Remix)	21	26	28	20	54	1	Non-album singles
"—" denotes single that did not chart or was not released.
