= MK (record producer) =

American DJ, record producer and remixer (born 1973)

Marc Kinchen

Background information
- Also known as: MK; 4th Measure Men
- Born: Marc Christopher Kinchen; August 3, 1972 (age 54); Detroit, Michigan, U.S.
- Genres: House; deep house; dance; pop; R&B; UK garage; drum and bass
- Occupations: DJ; record producer; remixer
- Instruments: Turntables; sampler
- Years active: 1989–present
- Labels: AREA10; Hot Creations; Defected; Creep Intl; DJs Are Not Rockstars; Charisma/Virgin/EMI
- Website: marc-kinchen.com

Marc Kinchen (born August 3, 1972), known by his initials MK, is an American DJ, record producer and remixer. He hit number-one on the US Billboard Hot Dance Music/Club Play chart in 1993 and 1994 with the songs "Always" and "Love Changes". Lead vocals on both of those tracks were performed by Alana Simon (songs were credited to MK featuring Alana). The combo also recorded the underground house music classic anthem "Burning". "Always" peaked at number 69 on the UK Singles Chart in February 1995. MK also hit the dance chart with "4 You", using the pseudonym 4th Measure Men.

In November 2013, his remix of Storm Queen's song "Look Right Through" was released on Defected Records and Warner Music and reached number-one on the UK Singles Chart.

Aside from his own career as a recording artist, he is also known for the remixes he produced for other artists, such as Celine Dion's single "Misled", which became the first number-one Billboard Dance/Club Play chart hit of Dion's career. His remixes of Betty Boo's single "Thing Goin' On" brought the song to number five on the same chart. His remixes of "The Message" by Sofia Shinas reached number 20 on the Dance/Club Play chart. He also produced the remixes of Jody Watley's single "Your Love Keeps Working On Me", which reached number two on that chart. Other remixes and productions include Lana Del Rey, Dev, Enrique Iglesias, Sky Ferreira, Ellie Goulding, Jamie Jones, Lee Foss, and Tricky.

Kinchen is responsible for the iconic remix of the Nightcrawlers' record "Push the Feeling On". The remix was successful internationally, becoming a number three UK hit. He also assisted Nightcrawlers frontman John Reid with a number of his further releases, but they did not have the same impact on the charts.

In April 2021, Kinchen scored his first number one on Billboard's Dance/Mix Show Airplay chart as a featured artist on Anabel Englund's "Underwater", which he also co-produced.

== Musical career ==
=== Production ===
In 2001, Kinchen moved to Los Angeles and started working with Denise Martell, who brought Kinchen in to begin working with David Foster.

In 2002, Kinchen became an in-house producer for actor and singer Will Smith. Kinchen then worked on Shark Tale, did production on one of Will Smith's albums, and did the music of the TV show All of Us, which was produced by Smith. Kinchen also produced for Willow and Jaden Smith with his production partner and other half of Stoopid Robots, Omarr Rambert.

Kinchen worked on projects with Diane Warren and Pitbull. Kinchen worked with Pitbull as a producer and produced three songs on the latter's Armando album (2010), two songs on the Planet Pit album (2011), and co-produced the theme song for Men in Black 3, "Back in Time" by Pitbull.

Kinchen also produced music in collaboration with Blinded in March 2014. In the same year, British DJ Route 94 remixed Kinchen's track "Always", which went on to peak at number 12 on the UK Singles Chart.

In 2022, MK was supported at his Dublin show in 3Arena by Belters Only, who subsequently worked on a remix of Kinchen's song "Teardrops on the Dancefloor". At the 2023 ARIA Music Awards he won Best Dance/Electronic Release for the single "Rhyme Dust" (February 2023), which was shared with collaborator Dom Dolla.

== Discography ==
=== Albums ===
- Surrender (with Alana Simon) (1993)
- Defected Presents House Masters: MK (2011) (Compilation album)
- Defected Presents MK in the House (2013) (Compilation album)
- Defected Presents House Masters: MK (Second Edition) (2013) (Compilation album)
- In the Night Again (2026)

=== Singles ===
Title	Year	Peak chart positions						Certifications	Album
Title	Year	AUS	BEL (FL)	IRE	UK	UK Dance	US Dance Club	Certifications	Album
"Somebody New"	1989	—	—	—	—	—	—		Non-album singles
"Decay" (with Never on Sunday)	1991	—	—	—	—	—	—		Non-album singles
"Burning" (featuring Alana)	1991	—	—	—	—	—	7	BPI: Silver	Surrender
"Always" (featuring Alana)	1992	—	—	—	69	7	1	BPI: Silver	Surrender
"Love Changes" (featuring Alana)	1993	—	—	—	—	—	1		Surrender
"Surrender" (featuring Alana)	1993	—	—	—	—	—	—		Surrender
"Burning '95" (featuring Alana)	1995	—	—	—	44	—	7		Surrender
"Lift Me Up" (featuring Clare Rivers)	1996	—	—	—	—	—	—		Non-album single
"Always" (Route 94 Remix)	2014	—	23	—	12	3	—		In the Night Again
"Bring Me to Life" (featuring Milly Pye)	2015	—	—	—	—	—	—		Non-album single
"Piece of Me" (with Becky Hill)	2016	—	—	53	37	13	5	BPI: 2× Platinum	In the Night Again
"My Love 4 U" (featuring A*M*E)	2016	—	—	—	—	—	—		Non-album single
"17"	2017	—	—	9	7	1	—	ARIA: Gold; BPI: 3× Platinum	In the Night Again
"Back & Forth" (with Jonas Blue and Becky Hill)	2018	88	—	11	12	2	—	BPI: Platinum	In the Night Again
"Body 2 Body"	2019	—	—	—	—	—	—		Non-album singles
"There for You" (with Gorgon City)	2019	—	—	—	99	—	1	BPI: Silver	Non-album singles
"One Night" (with Sonny Fodera featuring Raphaélla)	2019	—	—	50	51	10	40	BPI: Gold	In the Night Again
"2AM" (featuring Carla Monroe)	2020	—	—	—	—	—	—		Non-album single
"Underwater" (with Anabel Englund)	2020	—	—	—	—	—	—		Messing with Magic
"Lies" (featuring Raphaella)	2021	—	—	—	82	27	—		In the Night Again
"Chemical"	2021	—	—	—	—	—	—		In the Night Again
"Teardrops" (with Paul Woolford featuring Majid Jordan)	2022	—	—	—	—	—	—		In the Night Again
"Better" (with Burns featuring Teddy Swims)	2022	—	—	—	89	33	—		In the Night Again
"Kiss It Better" (with Aluna)	2022	—	—	—	—	—	—		Non-album single
"Rhyme Dust" (with Dom Dolla)	2023	32	—	31	63	15	—	ARIA: Platinum; BPI: Silver	In the Night Again
"Asking" (with Sonny Fodera featuring Clementine Douglas)	2023	—	—	9	7	3	—	ARIA: Platinum; BPI: 2× Platinum	In the Night Again
"Drinkin'" (with Joel Corry and Rita Ora)	2023	—	—	—	44	21	—		Another Friday Night
"Take My Chance"	2023	—	—	—	—	—	—		Non-album singles
"She's in the Club" (featuring Asal)	2024	—	—	—	—	—	—		Non-album singles
"Next to Me" (with Don Diablo featuring Gaby Gerlis)	2024	—	—	—	—	—	—		Non-album singles
"Dior" (featuring Chrystal)	2025	53	23	2	1	1	—	ARIA: Gold; BPI: Platinum	In the Night Again
"Come Find Me" (with Clementine Douglas)	2025	—	—	62	50	10	—	BPI: Silver	In the Night Again
"Never Let You Go" (with Illyus Barrientos)	2026	—	—	—	—	—	—		Non-album single
"Zone" (with Poppy Baskcomb)	2026	—	—	—	67	16	—		In the Night Again
"Leaving" (featuring Tristan Henry)	2026	—	—	—	—	—	—		In the Night Again
"Obsession" (featuring Ty Dolla Sign)	2026	—	—	—	—	—	—		In the Night Again
"Choice" (with Kareen Lomax)	2026	—	—	—	—	—	—		In the Night Again
"—" denotes singles that did not chart or were not released.

=== Songwriting and production credits ===
Title	Year	Artist(s)	Album	Credits	Written with	Produced with
"Push the Feeling On (The Dub of Doom)"	1992	Nightcrawlers	Non-album single	Producer	-	Phil Legg
"Anywhere"	1996	Proof	Anywhere EP	Producer	-	-
"Lois Lane"	1996	Proof	Anywhere EP	Producer	-	-
"Why?"	1996	Proof	Anywhere EP	Producer	-	-
"Come and Get Some" (featuring E-40)	1997	SWV	Release Some Tension	Co-writer/Producer	Cheryl Gamble, Earl Stevens	-
"Gettin' Funky" (featuring Snoop Dogg)	1997	SWV	Release Some Tension	Co-writer/Producer	Calvin Broadus	Kevin Evans
"Give Me What I Want"	1998	MC Lyte	Seven & Seven	Co-writer/Producer	Lana Moorer, Jamaal Barrow	-
"Another Way"	1998	Tevin Campbell	Tevin Campbell	Co-writer	Tevin Campbell, Theodore Turpin, Terrell Carter	-
"Only One for Me"	1999	Tevin Campbell	Tevin Campbell	Co-writer/Producer	Tevin Campbell, Faith Evans, Mike Mason	-
"7 Interlude"	1999	702	702	Co-writer/Producer	Irish Grinstead	-
"0 Interlude"	1999	702	702	Co-writer/Producer	Misha Grinstead	-
"2 Interlude"	1999	702	702	Co-writer/Producer	Kameelah Williams	-
"Will You Be OK"	1999	702	702	Co-writer/Producer	Angela Slates, Trina Powell, Tamara Powell	-
"Monica"	2000	Before Dark	Daydreamin'	Co-writer/Producer	Cynthia Loving, Carlos McKinney, Jarret Washington	-
"Upgrade U" (featuring Jay-Z)	2006	Beyoncé	B'Day	Co-writer	Beyonce Knowles-Carter, Solange Knowles, Makeba Riddick, Sean Garrett, Angela Beyincé, Sean Carter, William Clarke, Clarence Reid	-
"Mujeres"	2010	Pitbull	Armando	Producer	-	-
"Guantanamera (She's Hot)"	2010	Pitbull	Armando	Producer	-	DJ Buddha
"Amorosa" (featuring Papayo & MC Marcinho)	2010	Pitbull	Armando	Producer	-	DJ Laz
"Where Do We Go" (featuring Jamie Foxx)	2011	Pitbull	Planet Pit	Co-writer/Producer	Armando Perez, James Scheiffer, Daniel Morris, Leroy Sanchez, Eric Bishop	Jim Jonsin, Mr. Morris
"Back in Time"	2012	Pitbull	Global Warming	Co-writer/Producer	Armando Perez, Urales Vargas, Adrian Trejo, Mickey Baker, Sylvia Robinson, Ellas McDaniel	DJ Big Syphe, DJ Buddha
"Get It Started" (featuring Shakira)	2012	Pitbull	Global Warming	Co-writer/Producer	Armando Perez, Durrell Babbs, Urales Vargas, Sidney Samson, Bigram Zayas, Shakira Ripoll, Kristina Stephens	Sidney Samson, DVLP, DJ Buddha
"Down" (featuring OmARR & T. Coles)	2012	Jaden Smith	The Cool Café: The Cool; Tape Vol. I	Producer	-	OmARR
"Jus' Not Ready" (featuring T. Coles)	2012	Jaden Smith	The Cool Café: The Cool; Tape Vol. I	Producer	-	OmARR
"First Time" (featuring T. Coles)	2012	Jaden Smith	The Cool Café: The Cool; Tape Vol. I	Producer	-	OmARR
"Detroit"	2013	Hot Natured	Different Sides of the Sun	Co-writer/Producer	Lee Foss, Jamie Jones, Alexander Williams	Hot Natured, Mark Ralph
"My Loving"	2014	Mary J. Blige	The London Sessions	Co-producer	-	Darkchild
"Nothing" (featuring 2Hype)	2016	Big Flock	The Great Depression	Producer	-	-

== See also ==
- List of Billboard number-one dance club songs
- List of artists who reached number one on the U.S. Dance Club Songs chart
- List of artists who reached number one on the U.S. dance airplay chart
