= Need You Now (Hot Chip song) =

Single by Hot Chip

from the album Why Make Sense?
- B-side: "Huarache Lights" (Joe Goddard's Huarache Dub; 12")
- Released: 1 April 2015
- Genre: Deep house
- Length: 4:46 (album version); 3:58 (radio edit)
- Label: Domino
- Songwriters: Alexis Taylor; Joe Goddard; Felix Martin; Al Doyle; Stephen Hubert Cumberbatch; Michael James Bailey; Herman Jackson Brooks
- Producer: Hot Chip

Hot Chip singles chronology
| "Huarache Lights" (2015) | "Need You Now" (2015) |

Music video
- "Need You Now" on YouTube

"Need You Now" is a song by English synth-pop band Hot Chip. It is the second official single off their sixth studio album Why Make Sense?. The song was released on 1 April 2015 along with a music video, which was uploaded on the band's YouTube channel. It also peaked at number 70 on the Belgian Ultratip chart and at number 184 on the French Singles Chart. The song samples vocals from the song "I Need You Now" by Sinnamon.

== Music video ==
The official music video for the song was uploaded on 1 April 2015 on the Hot Chip YouTube channel. It was directed by visual arts group Shynola.

== Track listing ==
=== 12" vinyl ===
Side A
| No. | Title | Length |
|---|---|---|
| 1. | "Need You Now" (Percussions Edit) |

Side B
| No. | Title | Length |
|---|---|---|
| 1. | "Huarache Lights" (Joe Goddard's Huarache Dub) |

Domino – RUG659T

=== CD ===
| No. | Title | Length |
|---|---|---|
| 1. | "Need You Now" (radio edit) | 3:58 |

=== Digital download ===
| No. | Title | Length |
|---|---|---|
| 1. | "Need You Now" | 4:46 |

== Charts ==
| Chart (2015) | Peak position |
|---|---|
| Belgium (Ultratip Bubbling Under Flanders) | 70 |
| Belgium (Ultratip Bubbling Under Wallonia) | 28 |
| France (SNEP) | 184 |
