= Infinity (Infinity Ink song) =

Single by Infinity Ink
- Released: 2012
- Recorded: 2012
- Genre: Deep house
- Label: Crosstown Rebels
- Songwriters: Ali Love, Luca Cazal

Infinity Ink singles chronology
"Games" (2012)	"Infinity" (2012)	"The Rush (with Mr.V)" (2016)

Music video
- "Infinity" on YouTube

"Infinity" is a 2012 song recorded by music production and DJ duo Infinity Ink. The duo found fame in 2012 through "Games" on the Hot Creations label followed quickly by "Infinity" on the Crosstown Rebels label, released on 14 May 2012. The single was certified platinum by the Belgian Entertainment Association.

The song was sampled by Flo Rida on his 2013 single "Can't Believe It".

== Charts ==
"Infinity" charted in France and in both the Flanders and Wallonia Belgian singles charts where it was released on WEA and distributed by Warner. The single was also a hit in France on SNEP, the official French singles chart.

Chart (2012)	Peak position
Belgian Singles Chart (Flanders)	2
Belgian Singles Chart (Wallonia)	2
Hungary (Dance Top 40)	3
Hungary (Rádiós Top 40)	15
SNEP French Singles Chart	29

=== Year-end charts ===
Chart (2013)	Position
Hungarian Airplay Chart	86
