= Dusky =

English electronic music duo

- Origin: London, England
- Genres: Deep house, tech house, techno, house, breakbeat, downtempo
- Years active: 2011–present
- Labels: 17 Steps; Anjunadeep; Simple; Dogmatik; Aus Music; Naked Naked; Polydor
- Members: Alfie Granger-Howell; Nick Harriman
- Website: duskymusic.com

Dusky is an English electronic music duo from London consisting of Alfie Granger-Howell and Nick Harriman. Formed in 2011, they have released music on various records labels, before setting up their own label 17 Steps in July 2014 with the release of the Love Taking Over EP.

Before the formation of Dusky, the duo made music under the name of Solarity.

== History ==
=== Recognition ===
The duo were voted as DJ Magazine Best British Producers in 2013.

Their debut album, Stick By This, was named by Pete Tong as "one of the albums of the year" in 2011 and picked up BBC Radio 1 play from Rob Da Bank, Toddla T, Zane Lowe and Pete Tong himself.

Dusky's track "Careless" reached No.1 on the Beatport Top 100 Chart, remaining at the top spot for over 2 weeks. The track was part of the four track Careless EP, which was released on Will Saul's Aus Music label and followed their previous Beatport top 10 success "Nobody Else" on the label.

Dusky's track "Ingrid Is a Hybrid" is included on the Forza Horizon 3 soundtrack and put as the title screen theme, the song returned in Forza Horizon 5.

=== 17 Steps label ===
In 2014, Dusky released their Love Taking Over EP, the first on their 17 Steps label. The track was debuted by a Special Delivery on Annie Mac's BBC Radio 1 show and picked up further support across the station from Pete Tong, Danny Howard, MistaJam, B. Traits and Rob Da Bank among others.

=== Live performances ===
Standout live sets include performances at UK clubs XOYO and Fabric, hosting a Dusky Presents at Fabriclive in March 2014, as well as their residency at Ibiza's We Love...Sundays at Space.

They have also played festival sets including Glastonbury Festival in the UK, Belgium's Pukkelpop, Serbia's Exit Festival and Germany's Melt!, as well as North American festivals Electric Daisy Carnival, Electric Forest, Movement Electronic Music Festival, and Ultra Festival.

== Discography ==
=== Studio albums ===
Title	Label	Year
Stick by This	Anjunadeep	2011
Outer	Polydor	2016
Joy	17 Steps	2021
Pressure	17 Steps	2022

=== Extended plays ===
Title	Label	Year
Sticky by This Remixed EP1	Anjunadeep	2012
Henry 85 EP	Simple Records	2012
Flo Jam EP	Dogmatik Records	2012
Sticky by This Remixed EP2	Anjunadeep	2012
Nobody Else EP	Aus Music	2013
Careless EP	Aus Music	2013
Vanishing Point EP	Naked Naked	2013
Love Taking Over EP	17 Steps	2014
Ordinary World EP (31 July)	17 Steps	2015
Cold Heart EP	17 Steps	2017
Aset Forever EP	17 Steps	2018

=== Singles ===
Title	Label	Year
"Lost in You" (featuring Janai)	Anjunadeep	2011
"It's Not Enough" (featuring Janai)	Anjunadeep	2011
"Lost Highway"/"Three Colours"/"Someone Like You"	Anjunadeep	2012
"Calling Me"/"Muriel"	School Records	2012
"Mr Man"	Anjunadeep	2013
"Careless"	Careless - EP	2013
"9T8"	School Records	2014
"Yoohoo / Akebono"	17 Steps	2014
"Ingrid Is a Hybrid"	Polydor	2016
"Sort It Out Sharon" (featuring Wiley)	Polydor	2016
"Long Wait" (featuring Solomon Grey)	Polydor	2016
