= Reptile Youth =

Danish musical duo

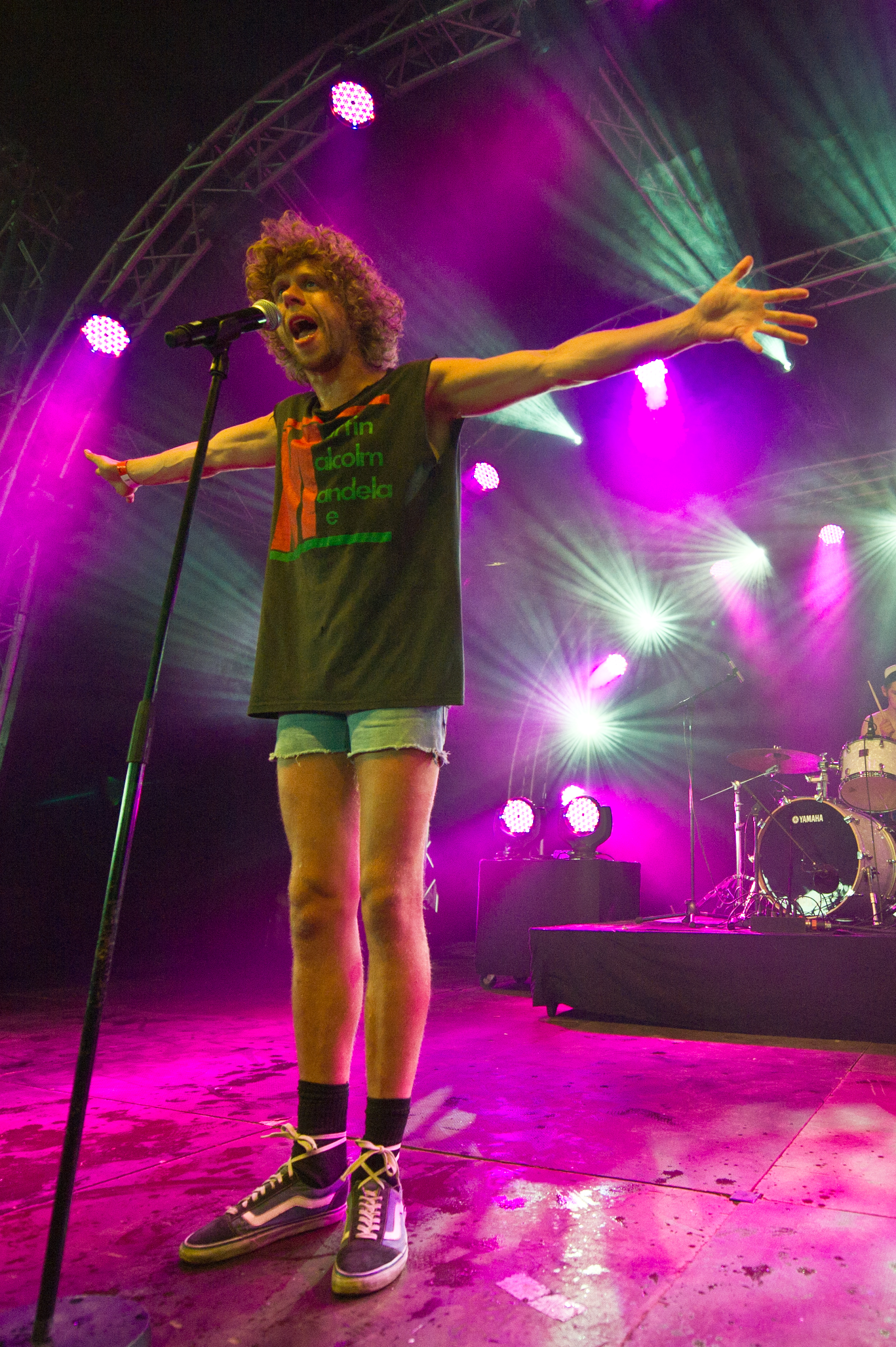
- Reptile Youth performing at Roskilde Festival, June 2011.

Background information
- Origin: Aarhus, Denmark
- Genres: Electronic rock
- Years active: 2009–present
- Members: Mads Damsgaard; Esben Valløe

Reptile Youth (formerly Reptile & Retard) is an electronic rock duo from Aarhus in Denmark. Founded in 2009, they have received fame in China after being promoted by the former Oasis booker Michael Ohlsson.

In March 2011, Reptile Youth started recording their first EP with the producer David M. Allen.

== Discography ==
- Reptile Youth (2012)
- Rivers That Run for a Sea That Is Gone (2014)
- Away (2015)
