= Hot Creations =

British record label

Hot Creation
- Founded: 2010
- Founder: Jamie Jones, Lee Foss
- Genre: Electronic music
- Country of origin: United Kingdom
- Official website: hotcreations.com

Hot Creations is a British record label co-founded by Jamie Jones and Lee Foss in 2010. It has produced a number of new acts, sub-labels and brands. HOTTRAX and Emerald City were founded as sister labels. The musical group, Hot Natured, which consists of Jones, Foss, Ali Love and Luca Cazal, was founded within the label. The group's release, "Benediction" from the 2013 album Different Sides of the Sun, charted in the UK Top 40.

== History ==
The label was founded in 2010 by Lee Foss and James Jones. According to Foss, he and Jones started the label with a "mutual love of house, techno, disco, soul and funk," noting they both had unreleased music, and that several artists had made music specifically to be released on a new label they started. Foss released his solo EP "U Got Me" on Hot Creations in 2010, as well as "Happen For a Reason." According to MixMag, the label "captured a certain sound taking over Ibiza dancefloors" when it was founded, and it "cultivated its own style of house music." Among other artists signed to the label were Richy Ahmed.

There have been a number of spinoff labels. Hottrax in 2012 was launched as a Hot Creations offshoot by Jones. According to Lee Foss, the label Emerald City was founded to do more "song-based stuff and not have Hot Creations really cluttered by so many different genre styles." Foss in 2016 remained an owner of the label. It put out its 100th release in 2017, an EP by Jones.

== Releases and artists ==
In 2015, artists included Ptreodactyl Disco, Jamie Jones, MK, HNQO, Patrick Topping, Hot Natured, Miguel Campbell, and Steve Lawler. Other Hot Creations artists have included Anabel Englund, wAFF, Benoit & Sergio, Butch, Digitaria, Funky Fat, Solardo, Mason Maynard, The Martinez Brothers, Sirius Hood, Robert James, Burnski, and De Signer. Pterodactil Disco, released on the label, involved Lee Foss, James Jones, Robert James, and FB Julian. Other artists on the label include Russ Yallop, Richy Ahmed, and MANIK. It has also released compilations, such as Hot Waves Volume -4'. Hot Creations has released over 100 EPs from artists such as Andrea Oliva, Alan Fitzpatrick, Rebuke, and Route 94.
