= Anabel Englund =

American singer and songwriter (born 1992)

- Englund in 2013

Background information
- Born: September 1, 1992 (age 34); New York City, U.S.
- Origin: Los Angeles, California, U.S.
- Genres: House; dance music; pop rock
- Occupations: Singer; songwriter; record producer; DJ; model
- Instruments: Vocals; piano; guitar
- Years active: 2011–present
- Labels: Area10; Ultra Music; Defected; Hot Creations; Gari Recs

Anabel Englund (born September 1, 1992) is an American singer, songwriter, record producer and DJ from Southern California. She is best known for her collaborative work with electronic and house music artists such as Hot Natured and MK.

Her debut album, Messing with Magic, was released in December 2020, with a deluxe edition releasing a few months later. It consisted of a compilation of all the singles released by Englund throughout that year under Ultra Music and AREA10, and featured "So Hot", "Picture Us", "Underwater" and "Waiting for You" which reached number one on U.S. dance radio.

== Early life ==
Born in New York City and raised in Los Angeles to a musical family, her father is American actor and singer Morgan Englund, her grandfather was the director-producer George Englund and her grandmother was the Academy Award-winning actress Cloris Leachman. Her great-grandmother Mabel Albertson and Mabel's brother, Jack Albertson, were also actors and came from a Jewish family.

Leachman inspired her granddaughter to become a singer. "My grandmother would make me sing in front of her actor friends but I'd be so shy, I'd have to face away," she recalls. Englund regularly cites her major influence as being Madonna.

== Career ==
She made her first foray as a performer at the Christian youth group she attended aged 16, and became a singer-songwriter at Disney-owned US TV network ABC Family supplying theme songs and other material for television shows. During 2010 and 2011, she wrote and performed largely piano-driven ballads both on her own and as part of a duo named Suburban Nightlife. In late 2012, she met producers Lee Foss and Jamie Jones, and, together with Marc Kinchen (MK), she collaborated on the song "Electricity," released through Hot Creations. The house track was lauded in the electronic music community and added to rotation on BBC Radio 1's Essential Mix playlist in January 2013.

The success of the track raised Englund's profile and she took part in the sessions that would become the 2013 album Different Sides of the Sun by British-American electronic/house group Hot Natured. She featured on three tracks: "Reverse Skydiving," "Mercury Rising" and "Emerald City." Remixes of these songs also highlighted Englund's contribution, while "Reverse Skydiving" reached number fifty-six on the Official UK Singles Chart. Englund then performed with Hot Natured at major music festivals around the world and also collaborated with Kinchen and Foss to form the Pleasure State project. Their debut EP Ghost In the System was released by Hot Creations on December 1, 2014. Earlier that year, Englund revealed she had signed a record deal with Three Six Zero, in partnership with Warner Bros. and Warner/Chappell Music, and was working on her debut solo album. She also signed a modeling contract with Britain's leading agency Models 1.

In October 2016, Defected Records announced they would be releasing Englund's debut solo single, "London Headache," on November 14, 2016, described as a "piece of alternative pop/house, with elements of disco running throughout [...] coupled with her deeply personal lyrics". Englund also began her own event that same year titled Gari Safari, consisting of a series of live shows. She then continued to feature on numerous other tracks by various DJs and performing around the world at multiple events and festivals. In 2019, Englund signed with MK's AREA10 imprint in partnership with Ultra Music and began releasing several singles. In May 2020, her single "So Hot" reached number one on U.S. dance radio for eight consecutive weeks. She topped the chart again with her single "Picture Us" in October 2020, also reaching number one on Billboard′s Dance/Mix Show Airplay. Englund's debut album Messing with Magic was released on December 11, 2020. In April 2021, "Underwater" became Englund's third song to top U.S. dance radio as well as her second number one on Billboard′s Dance/Mix Show Airplay chart. A deluxe version of Messing with Magic was released on May 21, 2021, and included her fourth number one on U.S. dance radio, "Waiting for You".

== Discography ==
=== Studio albums ===
List of studio albums, with selected details
Title	Album details
Messing with Magic	Released: December 11, 2020; Label: Area10, Ultra Music; Formats: Digital download, LP

=== Extended plays ===
List of extended plays, with selected details
Title	Album details
Anabel Englund (Note: Released through ABC Family for television shows and theme music purposes.)	Released: October 16, 2012; Label: ABC Family; Formats: Digital download
Born to Fly	Released: July 25, 2025; Label: Area10, Ultra Music; Formats: Digital download, LP

=== Singles ===
- 2016: "London Headache"
- 2018: "So Hot"
- 2019: "Messing with Magic" (with Jamie Jones)
- 2020: "See the Sky"
- 2020: "Warm Disco" (with Lee Foss)
- 2020: "Picture Us"
- 2020: "Underwater" (with MK)
- 2021: "Waiting for You" (with Yotto)
- 2021: "Midnight Rapture"
- 2022: "Lightwaves" (with Benny Benassi)
- 2022: "Need Me Right"
- 2023: "Strangely Sentimental"
- 2023: "A Lesson in Chemistry"
- 2024: "Get Busy"
- 2024: "Zen Cowboy"
- 2025: "Falling Up" (with Punctual)
- 2025: "King Size"
- 2025: "Belong to Me" (with Kamino)
- 2025: "Vision Blurred" (with Kaskade and CID)
- 2026: "Midnight Calling" (with DEPARTMENTO)

==== Promotional singles ====
- 2012: "Hard to Forget" (with Tyler Blackburn)
- 2012: "Once a Year"
- 2014: "Be With Me"

=== Guest appearances ===
- 2011: "Gone" (The Good Boys featuring Anabel Englund)
- 2012: "In Time" (PeaceTreaty featuring Anabel Englund)
- 2012: "Come Alive" (PatrickReza featuring Anabel Englund)
- 2012: "Electricity" (Lee Foss and MK featuring Anabel Englund)
- 2013: "Falling" (Human Life featuring Anabel Englund)
- 2013: "Nice Day" (Jez Dior featuring Anabel Englund)
- 2013: "Reverse Skydiving" (Hot Natured featuring Anabel Englund)
- 2013: "Mercury Rising" (Hot Natured featuring Anabel Englund)
- 2013: "Emerald City" (Hot Natured featuring Anabel Englund)
- 2014: "El Diablo" (Human Life featuring Anabel Englund)
- 2014: "Ghost in the System" (as part of Pleasure State)
- 2014: "Subject Matter" (as part of Pleasure State)
- 2015: "Talk to Me" (Human Life featuring Anabel Englund)
- 2015: "About U" (Tommy Trash and Burns) [Uncredited guest vocals]
- 2017: "Blue Is The Distance" (Lee Foss featuring Ali Love and Anabel Englund)
- 2017: "Cha Cha (Velvet Version)" (Tâches featuring Anabel Englund)
- 2017: "Rising" (Gari Recs featuring Anabel Englund, Human Life, Matt Ossentjuk and Mont Blvck)
- 2018: "Call U Rite Back" (Rybo featuring Anabel Englund)
- 2018: "Just for the High" (Rybo featuring Anabel Englund)
- 2018: "Old Times" (Amtrac featuring Anabel Englund)
- 2018: "Use Me Up" (CID featuring Anabel Englund)
- 2019: "Something New" (Rybo featuring Anabel Englund)
- 2019: "Brazil" (Lee Foss featuring Eli Brown and Anabel Englund)
- 2020: "Need Me" (Jaded featuring Anabel Englund)
- 2020: "Kiss From God" (Dirty South) [Uncredited guest vocals]
- 2020: "Only the Gods" (Disciples and Lee Foss featuring Anabel Englund)
- 2020: "Better on My Own" (Disciples featuring Anabel Englund)
- 2020: "Eyes on Me" (Mike Mago and TCTS featuring Anabel Englund)
- 2020: "Thunder & Lightning" (Lee Foss featuring Detlef and Anabel Englund)
- 2020: "I Have Synthed" (Lee Foss featuring Detlef and Anabel Englund)
- 2021: "Break Away" (as part of Pleasure State)
- 2021: "Take My Time" (as part of Pleasure State)
- 2021: "Infinity" (Blackhill) [Uncredited guest vocals]
- 2021: "Deja Vu" (with Oliver Heldens)
- 2021: "Coming Home" (Vintage Culture and Leftwing : Kody featuring Anabel Englund)
- 2022: "Low" (with Oliver Heldens and Tchami)
- 2023: "Anything 4 U" (with Kaleena Zanders)
- 2024: "Cutting Loose" (with Disco Lines and J. Worra)
- 2024: "Not Going Back" (DJ Susan and Novodor) [Uncredited guest vocals]
- 2024: "Different Worlds" (with Hayden James)
- 2024: "Honey Water" (Vicetone) [Uncredited guest vocals]
- 2025: "Josephine" (HRRTZ) [Uncredited guest vocals]

=== Charted songs ===
List of charted songs, showing album name and year released
Title	Year	Peak chart positions									Album
Title	Year	US Dance /Mix	US Dance /Elec.	CIS Air.	KAZ Air.	LAT Air.	RUS Air.	SRB Air.	UK	UK Dance	Album
"Reverse Skydiving" (Hot Natured featuring Anabel Englund)	2013	—	—	—	—	—	—	—	56	16	Different Sides of the Sun
"So Hot"	2018	2	—	—	—	—	—	—	—	—	Messing with Magic
"Picture Us"	2020	1	—	—	—	—	—	—	—	—	Messing with Magic
"Underwater" (with MK)	2020	1	—	—	—	—	—	—	—	—	Messing with Magic
"Waiting for You" (with Yotto)	2021	2	—	—	—	—	—	—	—	—	Messing with Magic
"Midnight Rapture"	2021	4	—	—	—	—	—	—	—	—	Non-album singles
"Deja Vu" (with Oliver Heldens)	2021	3	—	—	—	—	—	—	—	—	Non-album singles
"Lightwaves" (with Benny Benassi)	2022	6	—	—	—	—	—	—	—	—	Non-album singles
"Low" (with Oliver Heldens and Tchami)	2022	—	47	—	—	—	—	—	—	—	Non-album singles
"Need Me Right"	2022	1	—	—	—	—	—	—	—	—	Non-album singles
"Strangely Sentimental"	2023	1	—	—	—	—	—	—	—	—	Non-album singles
"Anything 4 U" (with Kaleena Zanders)	2023	3	—	—	—	—	—	—	—	—	Non-album singles
"A Lesson in Chemistry"	2023	1	—	—	—	—	—	—	—	—	Non-album singles
"Cutting Loose" (with Disco Lines and J. Worra)	2024	1	—	—	—	—	—	—	—	—	Non-album singles
"Get Busy"	2024	1	—	35	11	4	23	20	—	—	Born to Fly
"Zen Cowboy"	2024	18	—	—	—	—	—	—	—	—	Born to Fly
"Falling Up" (with Punctual)	2025	36	—	—	—	—	—	—	—	—	Born to Fly
"Born to Fly" (with Mary Droppinz)	2025	19	—	—	—	—	—	—	—	—	Born to Fly
"Vision Blurred" (with Kaskade and CID)	2026	28	— (Note: "Vision Blurred" did not enter the Billboard Hot Dance/Electronic Songs, but peaked at number 9 on the Dance Digital Song Sales chart.)	—	—	—	—	—	—	—	Non-album single
"—" denotes items that did not chart or were not released in that country.

== Music videos ==
Title	Year	Director(s)
"Hard to Forget" (with Tyler Blackburn)	2012	Hannah Lux Davis
"Reverse Skydiving" (Hot Natured featuring Anabel Englund)	2013	Chloe Hayward
"Ghost In the System" (Pleasure State)	2014	Stephen Garnett
"London Headache"	2016	Unknown
"Rising" (Gari Recs)	2017	Connor Jones
"So Hot"	2018	Galen Oakes
"Use Me Up" (CID featuring Anabel Englund)	2018	Unknown
"Messing with Magic" (with Jamie Jones)	2020	Lorenzo Diego Carrera
"So Hot" (MK and Nightlapse Remix)	2020	Chloë Holmes
"Warm Disco" (with Lee Foss)	2020	Chloë Holmes
"Picture Us" (Visualizers)	2020	Chloë Holmes
"Underwater" (Visualizer)	2020	Chloë Holmes
"Picture Us"	2020	Lorenzo Diego Carrera
"Underwater" (with MK)	2020	Ambar Navarro
"Burn It" (Lyric Video)	2020	Paige Strabala
"Float"	2021	J. A. Moreno
"Spell My Name"	2021	Winterhalter
"Underwater (Acoustic)"	2021	Unknown
"Don't Say Goodbye (I'm Not Ready)"	2021	Paige Strabala
"Boogie All Night" (with Dombresky)	2021	J. A. Moreno
"Burn It (Acoustic)"	2021	Unknown
"Waiting for You" (with Yotto)	2021	Conner Sorensen
"Picture Us (Acoustic)"	2021	Unknown
"Midnight Rapture"	2021	Nikko LaMere
"Deja Vu" (Lyric video) (with Oliver Heldens)	2021	Xkylar
"Low" (with Oliver Heldens and Tchami)	2022	Unknown
"Need Me Right"	2022	Borja Marting
"Strangely Sentimental" (Lyric Video)	2023	Paige Strabala
"Anything 4 U" (with Kaleena Zanders)	2023	Nas Bogado
"A Lesson in Chemistry" (Visualizer)	2023	Paige Strabala
"Get Busy" (Visualizer)	2024	Ivy Tellin
"Zen Cowboy" (Visualizer)	2024	Ivy Tellin

== Awards and nominations ==
Year	Organization	Category	Nominated work	Result
2021	iHeartRadio Music Awards	Dance Artist of the Year	Herself	Nominated
2022	Electronic Dance Music Awards	Vocalist of the Year	Herself	Nominated
2022	iHeartRadio Music Awards	Dance Artist of the Year	Herself	Nominated
2023	Clubbing TV Awards	Best Going Deep Video	"Midnight Rapture"	Won
2023	Electronic Dance Music Awards	Female Artist of the Year	Herself	Nominated
2023	Electronic Dance Music Awards	Dance Radio Artist of the Year	Herself	Nominated
2023	iHeartRadio Music Awards	Dance Artist of the Year	Herself	Won
2024	iHeartRadio Music Awards	Dance Artist of the Year	Herself	Nominated
2024	Electronic Dance Music Awards	Female Artist of the Year	Herself	Nominated
2024	Electronic Dance Music Awards	Dance Radio Artist of the Year	Herself	Nominated
2025	Electronic Dance Music Awards	Female Artist of the Year	Herself	Nominated
2025	Electronic Dance Music Awards	Dance Radio Artist of the Year	Herself	Nominated
2026	Electronic Dance Music Awards	Drum and Bass Song of the Year	"Born to Fly" (with Mary Droppinz)	Pending
2026	Electronic Dance Music Awards	Female Artist of the Year	Herself	Pending
2026	Electronic Dance Music Awards	Dance Radio Artist of the Year	Herself	Pending
