= Richy Ahmed =

British DJ and producer

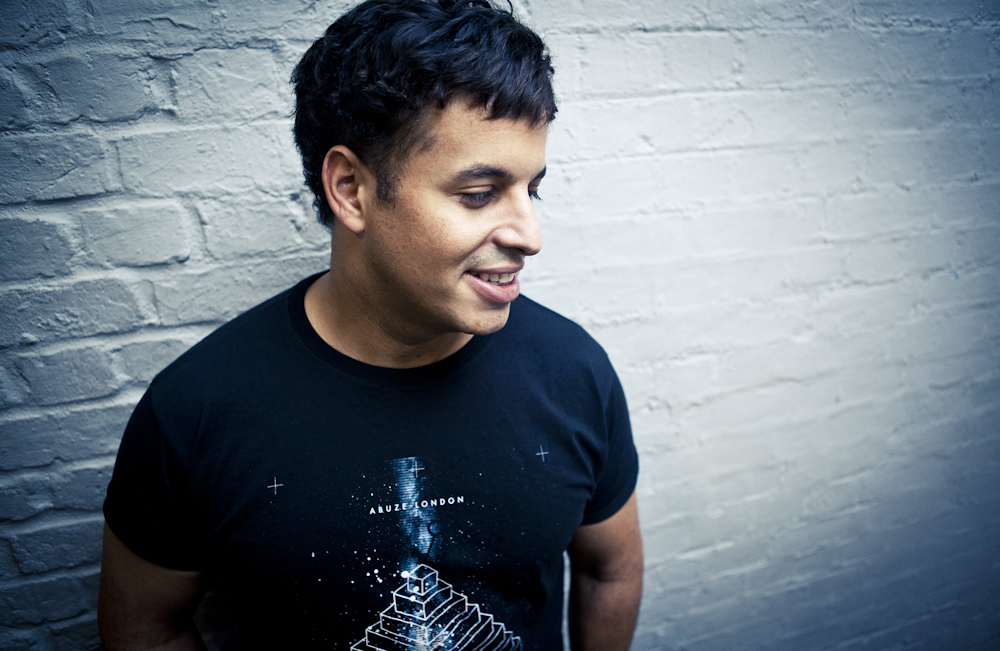

Background information
- Born: Richard Ahmed; South Shields, England
- Genres: House, deep house, techno
- Occupations: Producer, DJ
- Years active: 2010–present
- Labels: Hot Creations, Hotflush, Rinse Recordings

Richy Ahmed is a British DJ and producer from South Shields, England.

== About ==
Ahmed has performed at DC10 Ibiza for Paradise, Glastonbury Festival, Tomorrowland in Belgium, BPM - Mexico, and Blue Marlin venue in Dubai. In 2013, Ahmed was polled in Resident Advisor's Top 100 DJs and stayed in the top 100 in 2014.

His music has influences from disco, techno, funk, electro and hip hop. His music releases include "The Drums", which was named Pete Tong's Essential New Tune and more recently Sneaky Acid EP for Hot Creations' 50th release. Ahmed has joined the roster of artists taking part in the BBC Radio 1 Essential Mix, his own being broadcast on 29 November 2014.

== Discography ==
=== Singles and EPs ===
- 2013: "The Drums" (Hot Creations)
- 2013: Rinse: 23 Sampler (Rinse Recordings)
- 2014: Sneaky Acid (Hot Creations)
- 2015: "Can't You See" (Strictly Rhythm)

=== DJ mixes ===
- 2013: Rinse: 23 (Rinse Recordings)
