= Egyptian Hip Hop (band) =

English indie rock band (2008–2014)

- Origin: Greater Manchester, England
- Genres: Indie rock, art rock
- Years active: 2008–2014
- Labels: Hit Club; Pure Groove; R&S
- Past members: Nick Delap; Alex Hewett; Louis Stevenson-Miller; Alex Pierce; Thom Bellini

Egyptian Hip Hop were an English indie rock band formed in Greater Manchester in 2008. Their debut EP, Some Reptiles Grew Wings, was released 20 September 2010 via Hit Club. Their lone studio album Good Don't Sleep was released in the UK on 22 October 2012 via R&S Records.

== History ==
Egyptian Hip Hop was formed in winter 2008 by friends Alex Hewett (lead vocals, guitar and keyboards) and Louis Stevenson-Miller (guitar, bass, keyboards and backing vocals). They recruited school friends Alex Pierce (drums, backing vocals) and Nick Delap (guitar and bass), who had previously played in a band with Hewett under the name "Copycats".

The band began rehearsing at Manchester's Sunshine Studios and playing small gigs in the city's cafes and bars. They later embarked on their first UK tour with Is Tropical.

On 4 February 2010, Egyptian Hip Hop were invited to record a live session for Huw Stephens's BBC Radio One show, where they played four songs - "Wild Human Child", "Heavenly", "Moon Crooner" and "Valhalla Party".

On 15 March 2010, the band released a music video for Wild Human Child on YouTube. On 12 April 2010, they released a debut double A-side single "Wild Human Child" / "Heavenly", produced by Sam Eastgate of Late of the Pier on through the Hit Club /Zarcorp Records label. Following this, Egyptian Hip Hop were booked to play bigger festival slots, including Evolution, Reading and Leeds weekend and France's MIDI Festival.

On 20 September 2010, the band released their debut EP Some Reptiles Grew Wings (sometimes called Some Reptiles Developed Wings), which was recorded at Club Ralph Studios in London. The EP featured a new recording of "Rad Pitt" and an official version of "Moon Crooner", along with two previously unrecorded songs, "Middle Name Period" and "Native".

On 13 August 2012, Egyptian Hip Hop's new single "SYH" and first studio album Good Don't Sleep were announced via Twitter and Facebook The album was released on CD on 15 October in Japan (with two bonus tracks), and on 22 October 2012 in the UK/EU through R&S Records.

In 2012, the band added fifth member Thom Bellini, who was previously a touring session musician.

The group disbanded in 2014, and some of its members have continued to solo careers. Alex Hewett releases music under the name Aldous RH.

== Discography ==
=== Studio albums ===
- Good Don't Sleep (22 October 2012)

=== Singles ===
- "Wild Human Child" / "Heavenly" (Hit Club / Zarcorp Records - 12 April 2010)
- "SYH" (R&S Records - 18 August 2012)
- "Tobago" (R&S Records - 15 February 2013)

=== EPs ===
- Some Reptiles Grew Wings (EP) (Moshi Moshi - 20 September 2010)

=== Music videos ===
- Wild Human Child (15 March 2010)
- SYH (22 August 2012) - video by Isaac Eastgate
- Yoro Diallo (2 October 2012)
- Tobago (15 February 2013) - R&S Records
