= Always (MK song) =

1992 single by Marc Kinchen

Single by MK featuring Alana

from the album Surrender
- Released: November 10, 1992
- Genre: House
- Label: Charisma
- Songwriter: Marc Kinchen
- Producer: Marc Kinchen

MK singles chronology
"Burning" (1991)	"Always" (1992)	"Love Changes" (1993)

"Always" is a song by American producer MK featuring Alana. It was released in November 1992 as the lead single from their debut album, Surrender (1993). The song reached number-one on the US Billboard Hot Dance Club Songs chart in February 1993 It was released in the UK in January 1995 and subsequently reached number 69 on the UK Singles Chart.

== Charts ==
Chart (1992–1995)	Peak position
UK Singles (Official Charts)	69
UK Dance (Official Charts)	7
UK Club Chart (Music Week)	31
US Dance Club Songs (Billboard)	1
US Maxi-Singles Sales (Billboard)	28

== Route 94 remix ==
"Always" (Route 94 Remix)

Single by MK featuring Alana
- Released: 20 July 2014
- Recorded: 2013
- Genre: Deep house
- Length: 3:01 (radio edit); 6:00 (extended edit)
- Label: Ministry of Sound; Defected
- Songwriter: Marc Kinchen
- Producer: Rowan Jones (remix)

In 2013, the song was remixed by Route 94. The remix entered the UK Singles Chart at number 12 after its re-release in 2014.

=== Charts ===
Chart (2014)	Peak position
Belgium (Ultratop 50 Flanders)	23
UK Singles (Official Charts)	12
UK Dance (Official Charts)	3
UK Indie (Official Charts)	1

=== Certifications ===
Region	Certification	Certified units/sales
United Kingdom (BPI)	Silver	200,000^{‡}
^{‡} Sales+streaming figures based on certification alone.
