= Hot Natured =

British-American electronic music group

- Origin: London, United Kingdom
- Genres: Deep house, house, electronic
- Years active: 2009–2015 (on hiatus)
- Labels: Hot Creations, FFRR, Warner Music Group UK
- Members: Jamie Jones; Lee Foss; Luca C; Ali Love
- Website: https://myspace.com/hotnatured

Hot Natured is a British-American electronic music group consisting of Jamie Jones and Lee Foss, both co-founders of critically acclaimed electronic dance music label, Hot Creations. The group later on added members Ali Love and Luca Cazal from Infinity Ink.

The group's only studio album, Different Sides of the Sun, received a three-star rating from NME, and a four-star rating from The Irish Times.

== Discography ==
=== Studio albums ===
- Different Sides of the Sun (2013)

=== Singles/EPs ===
- "Off World Lover" (2015)
- "Benediction" (2014) re-release
- "Isis (Magic Carpet Ride)" (2013) (ft. The Egyptian Lover)
- "Reverse Skydiving" (2013) (ft. Anabel Englund)
- "Benediction" (2012) (with Ali Love)
- "Forward Motion" (2011) (ft. Ali Love)
- "Nino Brown" (2011)
- "Equilibrium" (2010)
- "H.E.A.D.S" (2008)

=== Remixes ===
- Phoenix - "Entertainment" (2013)
- Alexis Raphael - "Into The Light (Hot Natured Remix)" (2012)
- Waifs & Strays - "Body Shivers (Hot Natured Remix)" (2011)

=== Performances ===
On July 6, 2013, Hot Natured planned to perform in New York City at Terminal 5, but had to cancel the show due to problems with traveling visas. On March 14, Hot Natured performed at the CRSSD Festival in San Diego, CA. On April 10 & 17, 2015, Hot Natured performed at the Coachella Music Festival. On April 16 Hot Natured performed at The El Rey Theater in Los Angeles, CA.
