= Ali Love =

- Born: Alexander Williams; 15 September 1979 (age 47)
- Origin: London, England
- Genres: Electronica, House, Disco
- Instrument: Vocals
- Years active: 2006–present
- Labels: Back Yard Recordings, Dim Mak Records, Hot Creations, Defected, The Vinyl Factory, Crosstown Rebels

Ali Love (born Alexander Williams; 15 September 1979) is an English musician, singer, songwriter and record producer. Previously signed to Columbia Records as a solo artist, he is now a member of the house music band Hot Natured and the duo Infinity Ink.

== About ==
In 2006, Ali Love released his first two singles, "K-Hole" and "Camera on a Pole" on his own independent label "I Love Records". He rose to the limelight providing vocals for The Chemical Brothers hit, "Do It Again", for their 2007 album, We Are the Night. "Do It Again" was synced to the worldwide commercial for Paco Rabanne's "1 Million" and "Lady Million".

In 2007, Ali released his first major single, "Secret Sunday Lover". This was followed by "Late Night Session" on Columbia Records.

== Discography ==
=== Singles ===
- 2006: "K-Hole"
- 2006: "Camera on a Pole"
- 2007: "Do It Again" (with The Chemical Brothers) No. 12 UK, No. 2 Italy, No. 13 Japan, No. 16 Ireland
- 2007: "Secret Sunday Lover" (#45 UK, No. 22 UK Physical Singles Chart)
- 2007: "Late Night Session"
- 2009: "Diminishing Returns"
- 2010: "Love Harder"
- 2010: "Smoke & Mirrors"
- 2010: "Moscow Girl"
- 2011: "Different Morals" (with Luca C & Brigante)
- 2011: "Forward Motion" (Hot Natured (Jamie Jones and Lee Foss) song)
- 2011: "Civilization" (with Justice)
- 2012: "Infinity" (Infinity Ink )
- 2012: "Benediction" (Hot Natured (Jamie Jones and Lee Foss) song)
- 2012: "Playa/ Jungle"
- 2013: "Emperor"
- 2013: "Another"
- 2013: "Isis (Magic Carpet Ride)" (Hot Natured feat. The Egyptian Lover)
- 2013: "Reverse Skydiving " (Hot Natured feat. Anabel Englund)
- 2014: "What Can I Do?" (with Secondcity) No. 85 UK
- 2014: "Perfect Picture"
- 2014: "Deep into the Night"
- 2015: "EML Ritual" (with The Chemical Brothers)
- 2016: "The Rush" (Infinity Ink feat. Mr. V)
- 2016: "How Do I Love You" (Infinity Ink feat. Yasmin)
- 2016: "Full Capacity" (Infinity Ink)
- 2016: "Too Strong "
- 2016: "Till The Light" (Infinity Ink with Lee Foss)
- 2017: "Alienation " (Infinity Ink)
- 2017: "Blue is the distance" (with Lee Foss)
- 2017: "Throwing Stones" (with Freeform Five)
- 2018: "Dopamine Machine" (with CamelPhat)
- 2018: "Jacuzzi Rollercoaster" (with Róisín Murphy)
- 2018: "Rushing Back" (Infinity Ink feat. Yasmin)
- 2019: "Caught in the Middle" (Creative Principle (Dan Ward))
- 2020: "Stronger" (with Kaz James)
- 2020: "Everything" (with Acid Monday, The Show, Wolfgang Haffner)
- 2020: "My Life Muzik" (with Felix da Housecat)
- 2020: "Spektrum" (with CamelPhat)
- 2021: "Ubiquity" (with Nicky Night Time feat. Breakbot)
- 2021: "Confusion" (with &ME, Rampa, Adam Port, Keinemusik)

=== Albums ===
- 2007: Love Music
- 2010: Love Harder
- 2013: Different Sides Of The Sun (Hot Natured)
- 2014: P.U.M.P.
- 2019: House of Infinity (Infinity Ink)

=== Remixes ===
Title	Year	Artist(s)
K-Hole	2006	Mustapha 3000
K-Hole	2006	SebastiAn
Secret Sunday Lover	2007	Sebastien Ledger
Secret Sunday Lover	2007	Jon Kahuna
Secret Sunday Lover	2007	Tom Neville
Secret Sunday Lover	2007	Playgroup
Late Night Session	2007	Paul Epworth
Late Night Session	2007	Superafly
Diminishing Returns	2009	Luca C and Brigante
Diminishing Returns	2009	Alvin Risk
Diminishing Returns	2009	LF10
Love Harder	2010	Prins Thomas
Love Harder	2010	Mighty Mouse
Love Harder	2010	Jaymo, Andy George
Moscow Girl	2010	Jacques Renault
Moscow Girl	2010	Lee Foss
Moscow Girl	2010	Mustang
Smoke and Mirrors	2010	FuntCase
Smoke and Mirrors	2010	Villa
Smoke and Mirrors	2010	Fv0
Smoke and Mirrors	2010	Bottin
Different Morals	2011	Danny Daze
Different Morals	2011	Clockwork (C/W)
Different Morals	2011	Mat Playford
Harder	2013	Kissy Sell Out
Emperor	2013	Waze & Odyssey
Emperor	2013	Maceo Plex
Emperor	2013	The Foreigners
Another	2013	Felix Da Housecat
Another	2013	Tuff City Kids
Deep Into The Night	2014	THercules & Love Affair
Deep Into The Night	2014	Hackman
Deep Into The Night	2014	Samo DJ
Perfect Picture	2014	Skream
Perfect Picture	2014	Dubka, Luca Cazal
Perfect Picture	2014	Route 94
Perfect Picture	2014	Skream
SunKissed	2016	Mad Professor
SunKissed	2016	Apiento & LX
Throwing Stones	2017	Huxley
Throwing Stones	2017	Mickey
Throwing Stones	2017	Jamie Paton
Everything	2020	The Martinez Brothers
Stronger	2020	John Summit
Stronger	2020	DJ Tennis
Ubiquity	2021	ABCDJ
Ubiquity	2021	Eric Duncan
Ubiquity	2021	Lubelski
Ubiquity	2021	Happiness is Wealth
Ubiquity	2021	The Magician

=== Music videos ===
Title	Year	Director
K-Hole	2006	Aoife McArdle
Camera on a Pole	2006	
Vincent Brain	2007	Aoife McArdle
Secret Sunday Lover	2007	
Late Night Session	2007	
Do it again (with The Chemical Brothers)	2007	Michael Haussman
Diminishing Returns	2009	Jayne Helliwell
Smoke and Mirrors	2010	Jayne Helliwell
Love Harder	2010	Trevor Jackson
Moscow Girl	2010	Camille Bennett
Benediction (with Hot Natured )	2010	Samy Mosher
Infinity (with Infinity Ink )	2012	Dawn Shadforth
Infinity (Skream's 99 Remix) (with Infinity Ink )	2012	
Isis (Magic Carpet Ride) (with Hot Natured Feat. The Egyptian Lover)	2013	
Reverse Skydiving (with Hot Natured Feat.Anabel Englund )	2013	
Another	2013	Craig Murray
Emperor	2013	Craig Murray
Deep into the Night	2014	Adriano Vilanova & Georgie Curran
Perfect Picture	2014	
What Can I Do	2014	
Full Capacity (with Infinity Ink )	2016	Ben Reed
Jacuzzi Rollercoaster (with Róisín Murphy)	2018	Róisín Murphy
Rushing Back (with Infinity Ink Feat.Yasmin)	2019	Adriano Vilanova & Georgie Curran

=== Soundtracks and syncs ===
- Skins E4 Trailer – "Diminishing Returns"
- Paco Rabanne "1 Million" Advertisement – "Do it Again" (The Chemical Brothers)
- Paco Rabanne "Lady Million" Advertisement – "Do it Again" (The Chemical Brothers)
- Adidas 2011 "Adidas Is All In" Commercial – "Civilization" (Justice)

=== Television appearances ===
- Freshly Squeezed – Channel 4 (2007)
- MTV2 – Spanking New Sessions (2007)
- BBC2 – Warehouse Projects (2007)
