= Jamie Jones (DJ) =

Welsh DJ & producer (born 1980)

- Born: 28 October 1980 (age 45); Wales
- Origin: Bontnewydd, Wales
- Genres: House
- Occupations: Disc jockey, producer, remixer
- Years active: 2003–present
- Labels: Crosstown Rebels, Genesis Entertainment, Get Digital Music, Hot Creations, Leftroom Records, Hottrax, Emerald City

Jamie Jones is a Welsh DJ and producer.

== Biography ==
He is a member of the electronic music group Hot Natured and the head of the record label Hot Creations, as well as its sub-labels Emerald City and Hottrax. Jones was voted the top DJ of 2011 by the online dance music magazine Resident Advisor. In 2012 he received mainstream success with Hot Natured's single Benediction, which reached number 31 in the UK Singles Chart. Jones hosted his own Paradise party at Ibiza's DC10 nightclub for 8 seasons since 2012. In 2022 the Paradise party moved to Amnesia. In early 2016 Jones launched The House of Hot, an online shop clothing line, vinyl and artwork.

On 3 September 2021 Jones began an internationally syndicated show called Hot Robot Radio.

Jones performed at the 22nd Coachella Valley Music and Arts Festival in April 2023.

== Discography ==
=== Studio albums ===
- Don't You Remember The Future (2009)
- Tracks From The Crypt: Lost Classics From The Vaults 2007-2012 (2012)
- Different Sides Of The Sun (with Hot Natured) (2013)

=== Singles and EPs ===
- Amazon EP (2006)
- Panic (2006)
- The Capsule EP (2006)
- Should Have Gone Home (2007)
- Lady Judy (with Matthew Styles, Fuckpony) (2007)
- Get Lost 02 - Vinyl Sampler (with Plasmik) (2007)
- Still Here ? (2007)
- 911 (2008)
- Summertime (2009)
- Galactic Space Bar (2009)
- Hot Natured 01 (with Hot Natured) (2008)
- Jones & Mizrahi Edits (with Mizrahi) (2010)
- Re-Rubs 03 (with Hot Natured) (2010)
- Ruckus EP (2010)
- Re-Rubs 02 (with Hot Natured) (2008)
- Changes (2012)
- Our Time In Liberty (with Art Department) (2012)
- Moan & Groan (2013)
- Siberian Express (2015)
- This Way! EP' (2015)
- Land of Giants (featuring Hero Twins) (2016)
- Shoplifter (2016)
- Cherry's Revenge (with Nathan Barato) (2016)
- Kooky Music EP (2017)
- Electric Mama (with Harvy Valencia) (2020)

=== DJ mixes ===
- RA.031 (2006)
- Get Lost 02 (2007)
- OHMcast 003 (2009)
- Jamie Jones Vs. Seth Troxler(with Seth Troxler) (2010)
- Fabric 59 (2011)

=== Remixes ===
- Green Velvet — "Bigger Than Prince" (Jamie Jones and Darius Syrossian Remix)
