= Years & Years discography =

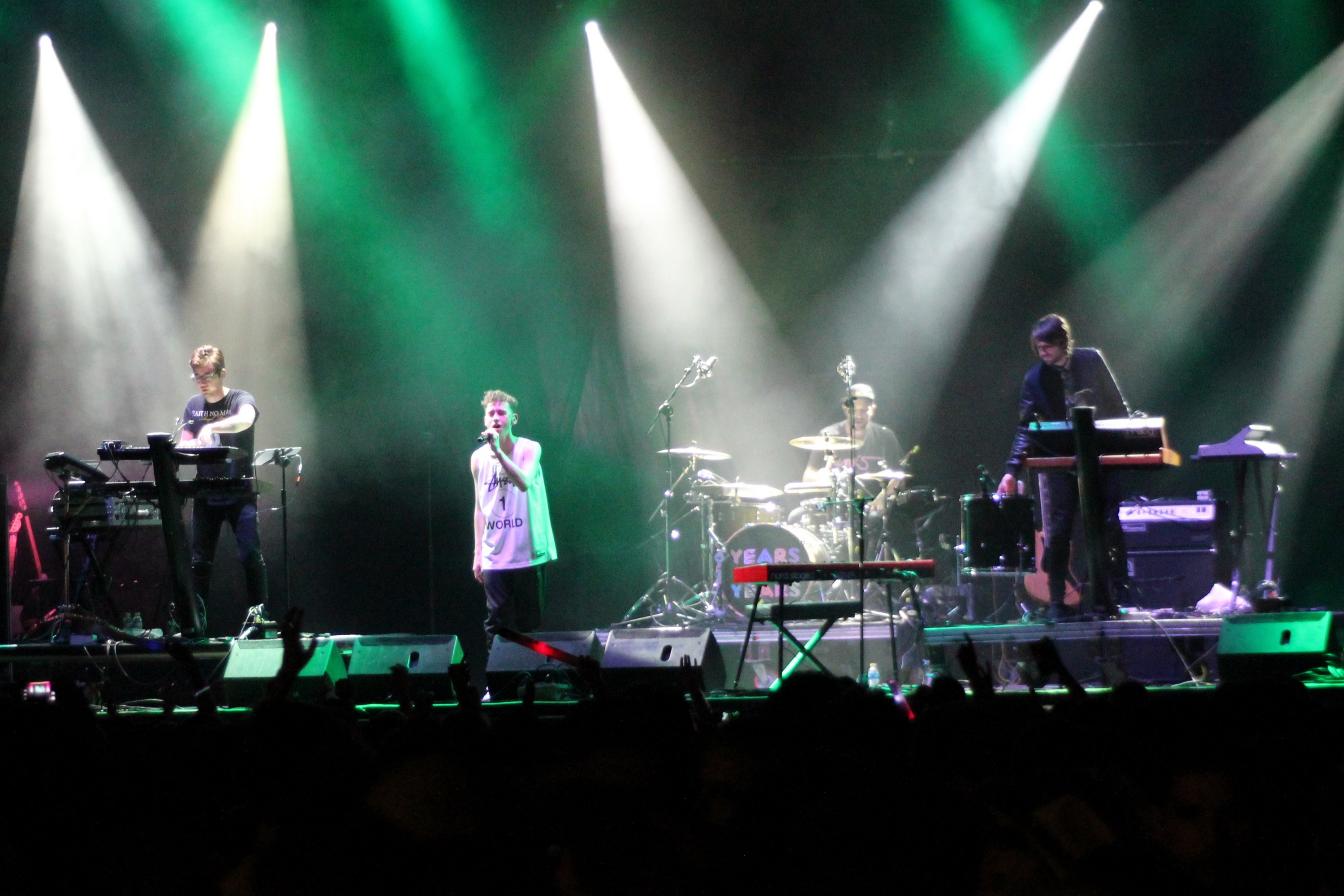
- Years & Years at Festival SOS 4.8 in Murcia, 2015
- Studio albums: 3
- EPs: 2
- Singles: 26
- Music videos: 19

British band Years & Years has released three studio albums, two extended plays, twenty six singles (including three as a featured artist and one promotional single), and nineteen music videos. Until 2021, Years & Years was a three-member band with Olly Alexander as the lead vocalist, and their releases under the Years & Years name until that point were released by the band rather than by Alexander as a solo act. After Emre Turkmen and Mikey Goldsworthy left the band, Years & Years became Alexander's solo project, and all releases under that name from the 2021 single "Starstruck" onwards were solo releases.

Years & Years' debut studio album, Communion, was released in 2015, charting at number one on the UK Albums Chart and obtaining Platinum status in the country. The band's debut single failed to chart in the UK, however, their third single "Desire" reached the UK top 40. Years & Years achieved global success and recognition for their 2015 hit single "King", which topped the UK charts and attained top-ten positions around the world, becoming their most successful single to date. This was followed by "Shine" and "Eyes Shut". Three years later in 2018, Years & Years released their second album Palo Santo, which was accompanied by the singles "Sanctify" and "If You're Over Me". In 2021, Years & Years became a solo project and released the single "Starstruck".

In December 2023, Years & Years disbanded. All of the music released under band's name has been renamed to "Olly Alexander (Years & Years)" on streaming services, therefore underlining that Alexander is the owner of the band's music catalogue.

== Studio albums ==
Title	Details	Peak chart positions										Sales	Certifications
Title	Details	UK	AUS	BEL	CAN	GER	IRE	NL	SCO	SWE	US	Sales	Certifications
Communion	Released: 10 July 2015; Label: Polydor, Interscope; Formats: CD, DL, LP, streaming	1	5	2	8	16	1	5	1	6	47	UK: 260,000	BPI: 2× Platinum; IFPI SWE: Gold
Palo Santo	Released: 6 July 2018; Label: Polydor; Formats: CD, DL, LP, streaming	3	26	6	52	27	7	14	3	38	75		BPI: Gold
Night Call	Released: 21 January 2022; Label: Polydor; Formats: CD, DL, LP, streaming, cassette	1	88	12	—	46	19	—	2	—	—		BPI: Gold
"—" denotes a recording that did not chart or was not released in that territory.

== Extended plays ==
Title	Details	Peak
Title	Details	US
Traps	Released: 9 September 2013; Label: Polydor, Kitsune	—
Y & Y	Released: 3 February 2015 (USA); Label: Polydor, Copenhagen	123

== Singles ==
=== As lead artist ===
Title	Year	Peak chart positions										Certifications	Album
Title	Year	UK	AUS	BEL	CAN	GER	IRE	NL	SCO	SWE	US Dance	Certifications	Album
"I Wish I Knew"	2012	—	—	—	—	—	—	—	—	—	—		Non-album single
"Traps"	2013	—	—	—	—	—	—	—	—	—	—		Traps
"Real"	2014	—	—	—	—	—	—	—	—	—	—		Communion
"Take Shelter"	2014	—	—	53	—	—	—	—	—	—	—	BPI: Silver	Communion
"Desire"	2014	22	—	57	—	—	61	32	20	—	21	BPI: 2× Platinum; IFPI DEN: Gold	Communion
"King"	2015	1	9	11	80	9	3	5	1	26	14	BPI: 4× Platinum; ARIA: Platinum; BVMI: Platinum; IFPI DEN: Platinum; IFPI SWE: 2× Platinum; RIAA: Gold	Communion
"Shine"	2015	2	15	18	—	29	9	77	1	81	47	BPI: 2× Platinum; ARIA: Gold; BVMI: Gold; IFPI DEN: Gold	Communion
"Eyes Shut"	2015	17	—	53	—	—	25	—	11	86	—	BPI: Platinum; IFPI DEN: Gold; IFPI SWE: Gold	Communion
"Desire" (featuring Tove Lo)	2016	27 (Note: This recording was combined with the original track by Years & Years and was not seen as a new hit under chart current regulations by the Official Chart Company, with its official peak still being number 22)	—	22	—	—	—	—	13	78	—		Communion
"Worship"	2016	–	—	72	—	—	—	—	—	—	50		Communion
"Meteorite"	2016	72	—	67	—	—	—	—	39	—	—		Bridget Jones's Baby
"Sanctify"	2018	25	—	47	—	—	57	—	16	—	19	BPI: Silver	Palo Santo
"If You're Over Me"	2018	6	147	50	—	—	7	—	4	43	16	BPI: 2× Platinum; IFPI DEN: Gold	Palo Santo
"All for You"	2018	47	—	79	—	—	70	—	31	—	29	BPI: Silver	Palo Santo
"Play" (with Jax Jones)	2018	8	—	59	—	—	19	—	9	—	34	BPI: Platinum	Snacks and Snacks (Supersize)
"Valentino" (with MNEK)	2019	—	—	—	—	—	—	—	—	—	—		Palo Santo
"It's a Sin" (solo or with Elton John)	2021	47	—	—	—	—	90	—	—	—	34		The Lockdown Sessions
"Starstruck" (solo or with Kylie Minogue)	2021	31	—	80	—	—	55	—	—	—	18	BPI: Silver	Night Call
"Crave"	2021	—	—	—	—	—	—	—	—	—	42		Night Call
"A Second to Midnight" (with Kylie Minogue) (Note: "A Second to Midnight" is also included on the deluxe version of Night Call album.)	2021	—	—	—	—	—	—	—	—	—	26		Disco: Guest List Edition
"Sweet Talker" (with Galantis)	2021	26	—	—	—	—	29	—	—	— (Note: "Sweet Talker" did not enter the Swedish Singellista Chart, but peaked at number two on the Swedish Heatseeker Chart.)	21	BPI: Gold	Night Call (Note: "Hallucination" is included on the streaming edition of Night Call (Deluxe).)
"Hallucination" (with Regard)	2022	56	—	—	—	—	71	—	—	—	28	BPI: Silver	Night Call
"100% Pure Love"	2022	—	—	—	—	—	—	—	—	—	—		Non-album singles
"Montero (Call Me by Your Name)"	2022	—	—	—	—	—	—	—	—	—	—		Non-album singles
"American Boy"	2022	—	—	—	—	—	—	—	—	—	—		Non-album singles
"A Very Bad Fun Idea"	2023	—	—	—	—	—	—	—	—	—	—		
"—" denotes a recording that did not chart or was not released in that territory.

=== As featured artist ===
Title	Year	Peak chart positions									Certifications	Album
Title	Year	UK	UK Dance	AUS	BEL (FL)	BEL (WA)	FRA	IRE	NL	SCO	Certifications	Album
"Sunlight" (The Magician featuring Years & Years)	2014	7	3	20	7	11	184	57	37	7	BPI: Gold; ARIA: Gold; BEA: Gold; NVPI: Platinum	Non-album singles
"Illuminate" (Tourist featuring Years & Years)	2019	—	—	—	—	—	—	—	—	—		Non-album singles
"Dreamland" (Pet Shop Boys featuring Years & Years)	2020	— (Note: "Dreamland" did not enter the UK Singles Chart, but peaked at number 26 on the UK Singles Downloads Chart.)	—	—	—	—	—	—	—	11		Hotspot
"—" denotes a recording that did not chart or was not released in that territory.

=== Promotional singles ===
Title	Year	Album
"Palo Santo"	2018	Palo Santo
"Sooner or Later"	2022	Night Call

== Other charted songs ==
Title	Year	Peak chart positions		Album
Title	Year	UK	US Dance	Album
"Ties"	2015	—	48	Communion
"Karma"	2018	91	21	Palo Santo
"Come Alive" (with Jess Glynne)	2018	80	—	The Greatest Showman: Reimagined
"Night Call"	2022	—	41	Night Call
"—" denotes a recording that did not chart or was not released in that territory.

== Guest appearances ==
List of guest appearances, showing year released and album name
Title	Year	Album
"Come Alive" (with Jess Glynne)	2018	The Greatest Showman: Reimagined
"A Very Bad Fun Idea"	2023	Bonus Track: Soundtrack

== Music videos ==
List of music videos, showing year released and directors
Title	Year	Director(s)	Ref.
"I Wish I Knew"	2012	Ayshea Halliwell	(Note: The music video for "I Wish I Knew" is no longer available on Years & Years' YouTube account.)
"Traps"	2013		(Note: The music video for "Traps" is no longer available on Years & Years' YouTube account.)
"Real"	2014	Robert Francis Müller	
"Take Shelter"	2014	Robert Francis Müller	
"Desire"	2014	Sing J Lee	
"King"	2015	Nadia Marquard Otzen	
"Foundation"	2015	Fred Rowson	
"Shine"	2015	Nadia Marquard Otzen	
"Shine" (Choose Dark)	2015	Fred Rowson	
"Eyes Shut"	2015	Chino Moya	
"Desire" (Gryffin Remix)	2015	Brian Harrison	
"Shine" (Choose Light)	2015	Fred Rowson	
"Shine" (Choose Shadow)	2015	Fred Rowson	
"Desire" (featuring Tove Lo)	2016	Fred Rowson	
"Worship"	2016	Matt Lambert	
"Meteorite"	2016	Ollie Wolf	
"Sanctify"	2018	Fred Rowson	
"If You're Over Me"	2018	Fred Rowson	
"All For You"	2018	Stephen Agnew	
"Valentino" (with MNEK)	2019	Olly Alexander	
"It's a Sin" (Montage Video)	2021	Olly Alexander	
"Starstruck"	2021	Fred Rowson	
"Crave"	2021	Tom Beard	
"Sweet Talker" (with Galantis)	2021	Sophia Ray	
