= 2015 UK Music Video Awards =

- Date: 5 November 2015
- Location: Roundhouse, London
- Hosted by: Adam Buxton
- Website: www.ukmva.com

The 2015 UK Music Video Awards were held on 5 November 2015 at the Roundhouse in London and was hosted by Adam Buxton to recognise the best in music videos and music film making from United Kingdom and worldwide. The nominations were announced on 30 September 2015. American rapper Kendrick Lamar won Video of the Year for "Alright", directed by Colin Tilley and The Little Homies. British director David Mallet received the Icon Award.

== Video of the Year ==
Video of the Year
- Kendrick Lamar – "Alright" (Directors: Colin Tilley and The Little Homies)

== Icon Award ==
Video of the Year
- David Mallet

== Video Genre Categories ==
Best Pop Video - UK	Best Pop Video - International
Mark Ronson ft. Bruno Mars – "Uptown Funk" (Directors: Cameron Duddy & Bruno Mars); Gabrielle Aplin – "Sweet Nothing"; George Ezra – "Listen to the Man"; Naughty Boy ft. Beyoncé & Arrow Benjamin – "Runnin' (Lose It All)"; Sam Smith – "Lay Me Down"; Years & Years – "King"	Rihanna – "Bitch Better Have My Money" (Director: Megaforce); DATA ft. Benny Sings – "Don't Sing"; OK Go – "I Won't Let You Down"; Roy Kafri – "Mayokero"; Sia – "Elastic Heart"; Taylor Swift – "Bad Blood"
Best Dance Video - UK	Best Dance Video - International
Leftfield & Sleaford Mods – "Head and Shoulders" (Director: Ewan & Casey); Clark – "To Live and Die in Grantham"; Fono – "Real Joy"; Grades – "King"; Hot Chip – "Need You Now"; The Chemical Brothers – "Sometimes I Feel So Deserted"	Tiga – "Bugatti" (Director: Helmi); Hook n Sling ft. Far East Movement – "Break Yourself"; Paul Kalkbrenner – "Feed Your Head"; Skrillex – "Doompy Poomp"; Tchami – "Promesses"; Ten Walls – "Walking with Elephants"
Best Urban Video - UK	Best Urban Video - International
Rag'n'Bone Man ft. Vince Staples – "Hell Yeah" (Director: Truman & Cooper); Dizzee Rascal – "Couple of Stacks"; Dizzee Rascal – "Pagans"; George the Poet – "1, 2, 1, 2"; Krept & Konan ft. Jeremih – "Freak of the Week"; Raleigh Ritchie – "Bloodsport '15 Pt 2"	Kendrick Lamar – "Alright" (Directors: Colin Tilley and The Little Homies); Childish Gambino – "Sober"; Run the Jewels ft. Zack de la Rocha – "Close Your Eyes (And Count to Fuck)"; SonReal – "For The Town"; Stromae – "Carmen"; Vince Staples ft. Future & Snoh Aalegra – "Señorita"
Best Rock/Indie Video - UK	Best Rock/Indie Video - International
Royal Blood – "Out of the Black" (Directors: David Wilson & Christy Karacas); Bastille vs Grades – "Torn Apart"; Florence + The Machine – "Queen of Peace"; Florence + The Machine – "What Kind of Man"; Noel Gallagher's High Flying Birds – "Ballad of the Mighty I"; Slaves – "Cheer Up London"	Tame Impala – "Let It Happen" (Director: David Wilson); Cold Mailman – "Something You Do"; Darwin Deez – "Kill Your Attitude"; Death from Above 1979 – "Virgins"; Joywave – "Somebody New"; U2 – "Every Breaking Wave"
Best Alternative Video - UK	Best Alternative Video - International
The Staves – "Black & White" (Director: Jack Whiteley); Alt-J – "Pusher"; Alt-J – "Every Other Freckle"; FKA Twigs – "Pendulum"; Glass Animals – "Hazey"; Philip Selway – "Coming Up for Air"	Flying Lotus ft. Kendrick Lamar – "Never Catch Me" (Director: Hiro Murai); Black Atlass – "Jewels"; Brodinski ft. SD – "Can't Help Myself"; Chet Faker – "Gold"; Flying Lotus – "Coronus, The Terminator"; Nicolas Godin – "Widerstehe Doch Der Sünde"
Best Pop Video - Budget	Best Dance Video - Budget
Aquilo – "Losing You" (Director: Eoin Glaister); ALB – "The Road"; Cais Sodré Funk Connection – "Offbeat"; Honne – "Coastal Love"; The Coronas – "Just Like That"; Zak Abel & Joker – "Wise Enough"	Lorn – "Acid Rain" (Director: R113); Delta Heavy – "Ghost"; Gwilym Gold – "Triumph"; Little Boots – "Taste It"; Rone ft. François Marry – "Quitter La Ville"; Sinkane – "How We Be"
Best Urban Video - Budget	Best Rock/Indie Video - Budget
DELS – "Burning Beaches" (Director: Us); A$AP Rocky – "Chevy"; Findlay – "Electric Bones"; Hervé ft. Knytro – "Money Where Your Mouth Is"; Run the Jewels – "Lie, Cheat, Steal"; Stig of the Dump ft. Jehst – "Kubrick"	Naïve New Beaters – "Run Away" (Director: Roman Chassaing); BRO – "Less Than Three"; Eaves – "Pylons"; Electric Youth – "Runaway"; Oscar – "Daffodil Days"; Stealing Sheep – "Deadlock"
Best Alternative Video - Budget
Son Lux – "Change Is Everything" (Director: Nathan Johnson); AE – "Dreamers"; Ariel Pink – "Dazed Inn Daydreams"; Bruce Smear – "Pick and Roll"; Dralms – "Crushed Pleats"; Young Fathers – "Shame"

== Technical Achievement Categories ==
Best Animation in a Video	Best Art Direction & Design in a Video
Royal Blood – "Out of the Black" (Animators: Mike Carlo, Ian Miller, Yuri Fain, Sachio Cook, Alex Kwan, Sam Marlo); Hugo 'Beats' Chegwin & Fred Berry – "Amaro & Walden's Joyride"; Leftfield & Sleaford Mods – "Head and Shoulders"; Panda Bear – "Boys Latin"; Son Lux – "Change Is Everything"; Stromae – "Carmen"	Tiga – "Bugatti" (Art Director: Anna Brun & Helmi); Fur Voice – "Fantasía"; Little Boots – "Taste It"; Snoop Dogg – "So Many Pros"; Take That – "These Days"; U2 – "Every Breaking Wave"
Best Cinematography in a Video	Best Choreography in a Video
Kendrick Lamar – "Alright" (DOPs: Corey Jennings & Rob Witt); Flying Lotus – "Coronus, The Terminator"; Naughty Boy ft. Beyoncé & Arrow Benjamin – "Runnin' (Lose It All)"; Nicolas Godin – "Widerstehe Doch Der Sünde"; Sam Smith – "Lay Me Down"; U2 – "Every Breaking Wave"	Sia – "Elastic Heart" (Choreographer: Ryan Heffington); Ed Sheeran – "Thinking Out Loud"; FKA twigs – "Glass & Patron"; Flying Lotus ft. Kendrick Lamar – "Never Catch Me"; Gwilym Gold – "Triumph"; OK Go – "I Won't Let You Down"
Best Editing in a Video	Best Styling in a Video
Royal Blood – "Out of the Black" (Editor: Max Windows at Stitch); Bruce Smear – "Pick and Roll"; DATA ft. Benny Sings – "Don't Sing"; The Chemical Brothers – "Sometimes I Feel So Deserted"; Tiga – "Bugatti"; U2 – "Every Breaking Wave"	Rihanna – "Bitch Better Have My Money" (Stylist: Mel Ottenberg); FKA twigs – "Glass & Patron"; Róisín Murphy – "Evil Eyes"; Snoop Dogg – "So Many Pros"; Taylor Swift – "Bad Blood"; Tiga – "Bugatti"
Best Colour Grade in a Video	Best Visual Effects in a Video
Rudimental – "Never Let You Go" (Colourist: Aubrey Woodiwiss); Benjamin Booker – "The Future is Slow Coming"; FKA Twigs – "M3LL155X"; Lapalux ft. Andreya Triana – "Puzzle"; Naughty Boy ft. Beyoncé & Arrow Benjamin – "Runnin' (Lose It All)"; The Chemical Brothers – "Sometimes I Feel So Deserted"	Black Atlass – "Jewels" (VFX Artist: Yoann Lemoine); Darwin Deez – "Kill Your Attitude"; Fur Voice – "Fantasía"; Maestro – "Darlin' Celsa"; Roy Kafri – "Mayokero"; The Bug – "Function/Void"

== Non-traditional Music Visual and Public Vote Categories ==
Best Live Music Coverage	Best Music Documentary
Lenny Kravitz – "Just Let Go" (Director: Paul Dugdale); Aerosmith Rocks Donington 2014; Gabrielle Aplin at Wilton's Music Hall; Jay Z & Beyoncé – "On the Run Tour"; Mumford & Sons – The Hospital Live Sessions; Wolf Alice – Vevo Lift UK	The Wrecking Crew (Director: Denny Tedesco); 808 – The Documentary; Backstreet Boys: Show 'Em What You're Made Of; Dazed x Channel 4 – Music Nation Open Mic; Noisey Israel Palestine – Hip Hop in the Holy Land; The Redemption of the Devil
Best Interactive Video	Best Lyric Video
Cee Lo Green – "Robin Williams" (Director: Vania Heymann); Coldplay – "Ink"; Foals – "Mountain at My Gate"; Steye & The Bizonkid – "What Do We Care 4"; The Geek x vrv – "Waves"; Years & Years – "Shine", Channel 4 Takeover	The Shoes – "Feed The Ghost" (Director: Dent De Cuir); Cee Lo Green – "Robin Williams"; Newham Generals ft. Wiley – "Scars"; The Rolling Stones – "Wild Horses"; Run the Jewels – "Early"; To Kill a King – "Love is Coal"

== Individual Categories ==
Best Producer	Best Commissioner
Sarah Tognazzi; Amber Millington; Corin Taylor; Jason Colon/Danielle Hinde; Jess Bell; Sarah Boardman	James Hackett; Caroline Clayton; Dan Curwin; Jane Third; John Moule; Sam Seager
Best Director	Best New Director
David Wilson; Colin Tilley; Fleur & Manu; Ian Pons Jewell; Ninian Doff; Vincent Haycock	Helmi; Dexter Navy; Eoin Glaister; Fred Rowson; Nelson de Castro; Zack Spiger
Best Artist
Flying Lotus; Alt-J; Ed Sheeran; Florence + The Machine; Kendrick Lamar; Years & Years
