= Night Call Tour =

2022 concert tour by Years & Years

The Night Call Tour
- Tour by Years & Years
- Associated album: Night Call
- Start date: 19 May 2022
- End date: 12 November 2022
- Legs: 4
- No. of shows: 20 in Europe; 2 in North America; 2 in Asia; 2 in Oceana; 24 total

Years & Years concert chronology
- Palo Santo Tour (2018–19); The Night Call Tour (2022); Up close and polari tour (2025)

The Night Call Tour was the third and final concert tour by the English synth-pop band Years & Years, which by then was a solo project of frontman Olly Alexander. The tour supported the Night Call album and began on 19 May 2022 at the Brighton Centre and concluded on 12 November in Melbourne, Australia.

== Background ==
On 18 March 2021, Years & Years, then a band featuring Olly Alexander, Emre Türkmen and Mikey Goldsworthy, announced their split, with Alexander stating that the trio had "grown apart musically". Alexander subsequently revealed that the band would instead become a solo project and that he would be releasing new music later in the year.

The Night Call Tour was announced on 29 October 2021 ahead of the release of the album of same name, which was released on 7 January 2022. On 22 March 2022, Alexander revealed via Instagram that Cat Burns, L Devine, Queer House Party and Eddy Luna would be supporting the UK and Ireland dates. Alexander was due to headline the Colourboxx Festival at Glasgow's Bellahouston Park on 25 June 2022, with Becky Hill, Bimini Bon-Boulash and Sugababes also on the bill however, the festival was later announced to have been cancelled.

In an interview with Hits Radio, Alexander said of the tour: "If anybody managed to catch a little bit of my New Year's Eve show, that was like a little taster of what the show is going to be. So I'm at the moment getting it together, but it's going to be a very queer, very fun, party vibe. I just want to give the people the best night of their life. That's all I want". Discussing the tour with the Evening Standard, Alexander explained that "my big inspiration for the tour was the movie Showgirls; especially the iconic scene towards the end where there's lava onstage and they're all in gold lamé and it's just insane" and also highlighted 1971's Pink Narcissus and Bob Fosse's 1972 Cabaret films as major inspirations. Alexander collaborated with visual artist Theo Adams for the show's staging, stating that "Theo's vision is super visceral and dirty, and a bit of a twisted take on a night out. We have toilet cubicles on stage! As far as bang for your buck, a toilet goes a long way. Visually they have a strong place in queer history as a place of hook-ups, love, lust and shame, as well as being this bodily space that we're slightly repulsed by". The costumes for the tour were designed by Rory Parnell Mooney and Alexander also consulted with a magician in order to be able to execute an illusion that takes place during "Up in Flames".

On 6 April 2022, it was announced that Years & Years would headline the rescheduled Summer Camp Festival, Australia's first touring Pride festival in November.

== Setlist ==
This set list is representative of the show on 19 May 2022, in Brighton. It is not representative of all concerts for the duration of the tour.

1. "Night Call"
2. "Sweet Talker"
3. "Consequences"
4. "Sooner or Later"
5. "Shine"
6. "Muscle"
7. "Play"
8. "Sunlight"
9. "Sanctify"
10. "Worship/Rendezvous"
11. "Desire"
12. "Hallucination"
13. "Up in Flames"
14. "Here"
15. "20 Minutes"
16. "Eyes Shut"
17. "It's a Sin" (Pet Shop Boys cover)
18. "Crave"
19. "Starstruck"

Encore

20. "If You're Over Me"
21. "King"

== Critical response ==
Reviewing the Wembley Arena show, Sam Rice of the Evening Standard stated that "solo suits the band's frontman, who kept the crowd in the palm of his hand". In his four star review, Rice praised Alexander's playfulness on stage, explaining that "The BAFTA-nominated, chart-topping renaissance man gave a slick performance on this London date of his Night Call tour - but with the humour and impish charm of someone who clearly still knows how to have fun" and highlighted that "even when dipping into songs from Years and Years’ previous two albums, the set was almost entirely roof-raising pop-synth and disco bangers". Rice summarized that "Alexander's show was a triumphant showcase of the power of pop to liberate, titillate and be buckets full of fun".

At the UK tour's closing show at the AO Arena, Nicole Wooton-Cane of Manchester Evening News noted that "Alexander had the crowd hooked from the start as him and his dancers somehow turned grotty British telephone boxes into a stage that sold his vision of a gritty yet sexy after hours world" and praised the show's visuals and set design. She acknowledged that, owing to it being the final show, Alexander's "voice struggled slightly to keep up with the intense and impressive choreography but he was such a captivating performer that this hardly even mattered - he clearly felt every word he sung". Wooton-Cane singled out the stripped down section of the setlist, which featured Alexander and his backing singers performing at a piano, as the show's most memorable moment, describing how "the crowd waved their phone torches and cheered Alexander on as he made his way through a tearful rendition of Eyes Shut, stopping occasionally as he became overwhelmed by emotion. It was a touching addition to the show that brought me to tears and filled the room with a thousand voices singing of heartbreak and strength. Despite the 21,000 strong venue, you felt a human side to Alexander that was intimate and moving". She concluded that "Alexander's unlimited energy and impressive performance was matched by the gripping visuals that might've dominated a less commanding performer - but the two blended together seamlessly to make an enthralling experience".

Alexander reported that he had experienced some criticism from a small number of audience members who claimed that the show was not family-friendly enough and responded that "there's never been anything explicit or gratuitous about a Years & Years show, so yeah, I find the reaction to be quite interesting", comparing it to a similar reaction that he received during his BBC New Year's show.

== Tour dates ==
List of concerts, showing date, city, country, venue and opening acts
Date	City	Country	Venue	Opening acts
Europe
19 May 2022	Brighton	England	Brighton Centre	Cat Burns; Queer House Party
20 May 2022	Bournemouth	England	International Centre	Cat Burns; Queer House Party
21 May 2022	Birmingham	England	Resorts World Arena	Cat Burns; Queer House Party
23 May 2022	Nottingham	England	Motorpoint Arena	L Devine; Queer House Party; Eddy Luna
26 May 2022	London	England	Wembley Arena	Cat Burns; Queer House Party
28 May 2022	Manchester	England	AO Arena	L Devine; Queer House Party
3 June 2022 (Note: The concert on 3 June in Plymouth was part of the 1 Big Summer festival.)	Plymouth	England	Plymouth Hoe	N/A
North America
5 June 2022 (Note: The concert on 5 June in Los Angeles was part of the Outloud festival.)	Los Angeles	United States	West Hollywood Park	N/A
7 June 2022	New York	United States	Brooklyn Mirage	Miya Folick; Ty Sunderland
Europe
19 June 2022 (Note: The concert on 19 June in Werchter was part of the Werchter Boutique.)	Werchter	Belgium	Werchter Festivalpark	N/A
24 June 2022	Dublin	Ireland	National Museum of Ireland	Cat Burns; Queer House Party
26 June 2022 (Note: The concert on 26 June in Somseset was part of the Glastonbury Festival.)	Somerset	England	Worthy Farm	N/A
2 July 2022 (Note: The concert on 2 July in Montreux was part of the Montreux Jazz Festival.)	Montreux	Switzerland	Montreux Convention Centre	N/A
3 July 2022 (Note: The concert on 3 July in St. Gallen was part of the Open Air festival.)	St. Gallen	Switzerland	St. Gallen	N/A
9 July 2022 (Note: The concert on 12 August in Piešťany was part of the TRNSMT festival.)	Glasgow	Scotland	Glasgow Green	N/A
6 August 2022 (Note: The concert on 6 August in Charlbury was part of the Wilderness Festival.)	Charlbury	England	Cornbury Park	N/A
12 August 2022 (Note: The concert on 12 August in Piešťany was part of the GrapeFestival.)	Piešťany	Slovakia	Piešťany Airport	N/A
1 September 2022 (Note: The concert on 1 September in Lisbon was part of the Kalorama festival.)	Lisbon	Portugal	Bela Vista Park	N/A
3 September 2022 (Note: The concert on 3 September in Munich was part of the Superbloom festival.)	Munich	Germany	Olympiastadion	N/A
4 September 2022 (Note: The concert on 4 September in Mogoșoaia was part of the Fall in Love Festival.)	Mogoșoaia	Romania	Mogoșoaia Park	N/A
8 September 2022 (Note: The concert in Vigo on 8 September 2022 was part of the Ano Santo Xacobeo Celebrations.)	Vigo	Spain	Balaídos	N/A
10 September 2022 (Note: The concert on 10 September in Málaga was part of the Andalucia Big Festival.)	Málaga	Spain	Sacaba Beach	N/A
17 September 2022 (Note: The concert on 4 September in Madrid was part of the D Code Festival.)	Madrid	Spain	Complutense University of Madrid	
Asia
27 October 2022	Seoul	South Korea	Yes24 Live Hall	
29 October 2022 (Note: This was part of the TONAL Tokyo Festival)	Tokyo	Japan	Ariake Arena	
4 November 2022 (Note: The concert on 4 November 2022 at the GBK Softball Stadium in Jakarta, Indonesia was part of Joyland Festival.)	Jakarta	Indonesia	GBK Softball Stadium	
Oceania
5 November 2022 (Note: The concert on 5 November in Sydney was part of the Summer Camp festival.)	Sydney	Australia	Centennial Park	N/A
12 November 2022 (Note: The concert on 12 November in Melbourne was part of the Summer Camp festival.)	Melbourne	Australia	Reunion Park	N/A

== Cancelled shows ==
Date	City	Country	Venue	Reason
12 June 2022 (Note: The concert on 12 June in Newcastle was part of the Rock'N'Roll Circus.)	Newcastle	England	Town Moor	Festival cancellation
25 June 2022 (Note: The concert on 25 June in Glasgow was part of the Colourboxx Festival.)	Glasgow	Scotland	Bellahouston Park	Festival cancellation
30 June 2022 (Note: The concert on 30 June in Gdynia was part of the Open'er Festival.)	Gdynia	Poland	Kosakowo Airport	Unforeseen circumstances
23 September 2022	Oslo	Norway	Sentrum Scene	Unforeseen circumstances
25 September 2022	Stockholm	Sweden	Fållan	Unforeseen circumstances
26 September 2022	Copenhagen	Denmark	Vega	Unforeseen circumstances
28 September 2022	Hamburg	Germany	Edel-optics.de Arena	Unforeseen circumstances
30 September 2022	Amsterdam	The Netherlands	AFAS Live	Unforeseen circumstances
1 October 2022	Brussels	Belgium	Forest National	Unforeseen circumstances
3 October 2022	Berlin	Germany	Columbiahalle	Unforeseen circumstances
5 October 2022	Prague	Czech Republic	Forum Karlin	Unforeseen circumstances
7 October 2022	Offenbach	Germany	Capitol Theater	Unforeseen circumstances
8 October 2022	Zürich	Switzerland	Volkhaus	Unforeseen circumstances
9 October 2022	Milan	Italy	Fabrique	Unforeseen circumstances
11 October 2022	Cologne	Germany	Palladium	Unforeseen circumstances
12 October 2022	Luxembourg City	Luxembourg	Den Atelier	Unforeseen circumstances
13 October 2022	Paris	France	Zénith	Unforeseen circumstances

== Personnel ==
Years & Years

- Olly Alexander - lead vocals, piano

Band

- Mikey Goldsworthy - synthesisers, keyboard, bass guitar
- Paris Jeffree - drums
- Joell Fender - backing vocals
- Yasmin Green - backing vocals
- Tehillah Daniel - backing vocals

Dancers

- Kibrea Carmichael
- Max Cookward
- Jamie Graham
- Sarah Li Baugstø
- Artemis Stamouli
