= Night Call (album) =

- Standard cover

Studio album by Years & Years
- Released: 21 January 2022
- Studios: Club Ralph; Angelic
- Genre: Pop
- Length: 33:57
- Label: Polydor
- Producers: DetoNate; Galantis; Georgia; King Ed; Mark Ralph; George Reid

Years & Years chronology
Palo Santo (2018)	Night Call (2022)	Polari (2025)

Singles from Night Call
- 1. "Starstruck" Released: 8 April 2021; 2. "Crave" Released: 28 September 2021; 3. "Sweet Talker" Released: 24 November 2021; 4. "Hallucination" Released: 18 February 2022

Night Call is the third and final studio album by the British band Years & Years, released on 21 January 2022 by Polydor Records. It serves as the follow-up to their second album Palo Santo (2018). Marking the only album release of Years & Years as Alexander's solo project following the departure of Mikey Goldsworthy and Emre Türkmen, it was preceded by three singles; "Starstruck", "Crave", "Sweet Talker" with Swedish DJ duo Galantis. Years & Years embarked on the Night Call Tour in support of the album in the UK and Ireland.

== Background ==
Years & Years released their second album Palo Santo on 6 July 2018, supported by four singles. The album was commercially and critically successful, receiving critical acclaim from music critics and debuting in the top 3 on the UK Albums Chart. They also embarked on the Palo Santo Tour (2018–19) in support of the album.

On 18 March 2021, the band announced a third Years & Years album to be released in 2021. It was simultaneously announced that Goldsworthy and Türkmen had stepped down as active members, and that the act would continue as Alexander's solo project.

On 28 September 2021, the album's cover art, title, and release date were revealed on his social media accounts. Speaking about Night Call, Alexander said in a statement: "I was writing from a fantastical space, stuck in the same four walls. I wanted to have as much pleasure as possible in the music." The album was loosely inspired by artists appearing on the soundtrack of television series It's A Sin (2021), including Bronski Beat, Wham!, Orchestral Manoeuvres in the Dark and the Pet Shop Boys. It takes its name from a euphemism for hooking up.

== Singles ==
On 23 March 2021, Olly Alexander announced the lead single off the album "Starstruck", which was released on 8 April. It was Alexander's first song release with Years & Years being a solo project, following the departures of Goldsworthy and Türkmen. The song peaked at 31 on the UK Singles Chart, and was promoted with a music video, which was released on 12 April, and a variety of remixes, including one with Australian singer Kylie Minogue.

"Crave" was released on 28 September 2021 as the second single off the album, which was announced along with the album announcement. A music video for the song premiered on the same day.

"Sweet Talker", which features Swedish electronic music duo Galantis, was released as the third and final single off the album on 24 November 2021. The music video for the song premiered on 9 December, and the song peaked at 26 on the UK Singles Chart. It was hailed Billboard as "a romantic, glorious dancefloor anthem" and Dancing Astronaut labelling it "a tour de force".

=== Other notable songs ===
Ahead of the album's release, "Sooner or Later" was released on 14 January 2022 with a lyric video being released on the same day. The song was co-written by Alexander, Clarence Coffee Jr., and Mark Ralph, who also produced the song. The track is a synth-pop track, with it lyrically talking about Alexander chasing after a lost love who broke his heart."

"Hallucination" was released on 18 February 2022, which featured on a reissued deluxe edition of Night Call on Spotify. The song features Kosovo Albanian DJ Regard and lyrically finds Alexander "warning off serial heartbreakers."

== Critical reception ==
Professional ratings
Aggregate scores
Source	Rating
AnyDecentMusic?	6.6/10
Metacritic	71/100
Review scores
Source	Rating
AllMusic	4/5 stars
Clash	7/10
Evening Standard	4/5 stars
Gigwise	7/10 stars
The Guardian	4/5 stars
The Independent	5/5 stars
musicOMH	3/5 stars
NME	4/5 stars
The Skinny	2/5 stars
The Telegraph	3/5 stars

Night Call has received generally favourable reviews from music critics. At Metacritic, which assigns a normalised rating out of 100 to reviews from mainstream critics, the album has an average score of 71 based on 13 reviews. Aggregator AnyDecentMusic? gave it 6.6 out of 10, based on their assessment of the critical consensus.

AllMusic's Mark Collar said "While Night Call builds nicely upon Years & Years' indie electronic roots, it primarily feels like a new beginning for Alexander as he boldly embraces his pop future."

In a positive review Robin Murray from Clash said that "It never quite transgresses those influences, yet in terms of sheer charm and bravura it places Olly right up there with his idols."

Ben Devlin from musicOMH wrote that "Night Call, for all its merits, is a selection of pop songs that have no meaningful connection and which one could hear anywhere."

In a mixed review writing for The Skinny Nadia Younes said "Unfortunately, Olly Alexander’s first solo outing as Years & Years doesn’t quite hit the mark, but even though they may be few and far between, there are still some glimmers of potential on Night Call."

== Track listing ==
Standard edition
No.	Title	Writer(s)	Producer(s)	Length
1.	"Consequences"	Olly Alexander; Mark Ralph	Ralph; King Ed; Dennis White^{[a]}	3:05
2.	"Starstruck"	Alexander; Clarence Coffee Jr.; Ralph; Nathaniel Ledwidge	Ralph; DetoNate	3:27
3.	"Night Call"	Alexander; George Reid; Ralph; Max Wolfgang	Ralph; Reid	2:50
4.	"Intimacy"	Alexander; Coffee; Ralph; Ledwidge	Ralph; DetoNate	2:35
5.	"Crave"	Alexander; Coffee; Ralph; Ledwidge	Ralph; DetoNate	3:17
6.	"Sweet Talker" (with Galantis)	Alexander; Ralph; Wolfgang; Christian Karlsson	Ralph; Galantis	2:57
7.	"Sooner or Later"	Alexander; Coffee; Ralph	Ralph; White^{[a]}	3:20
8.	"20 Minutes"	Alexander; Jesse Shatkin; Stephen Wrabel	Ralph; Reid	2:59
9.	"Strange and Unusual"	Alexander; Coffee; Ralph; Ledwidge	Ralph; DetoNate	3:15
10.	"Make It Out Alive"	Alexander; Ilsey Juber; Shatkin; Ralph	Ralph; Georgia	3:03
11.	"See You Again"	Alexander; Caroline Ailin; Ralph; Ledwidge	Ralph; DetoNate; White^{[a]}	3:09
Total length:				33:57

Deluxe edition
No.	Title	Writer(s)	Producer(s)	Length
12.	"Immaculate"	Alexander; Wolfgang; Ralph	Ralph; Reid	2:51
13.	"Muscle"	Alexander; Wrabel; Joel Little	Little	3:07
14.	"Reflection"	Alexander; Coffee; Ledwidge	DetoNate; Coffee^{[v]}	3:31
15.	"A Second to Midnight" (with Kylie Minogue)	Kylie Minogue; Alexander; Martin Sjølie; Biff Stannard; Duck Blackwell	Stannard; Blackwell	3:27
16.	"Starstruck" (Kylie Minogue remix)	Alexander; Coffee; Ralph; Ledwidge; Minogue	Ralph; DetoNate	3:26
Total length:				50:19

Japanese edition bonus track
No.	Title	Writer(s)	Producer(s)	Length
17.	"Starstruck" (with Sirup; Sirup Remix)	Alexander; Coffee; Ralph; Ledwidge; Sirup	Ralph; DetoNate	3:51
Total length:				53:51

Streaming deluxe edition re-issue
No.	Title	Writer(s)	Producer(s)	Length
15.	"Hallucination" (with Regard)	Dardan Aliu; Alexander; Little; Jean-Jacques Goldman; Nadia Mladjao; Stefane Goldman	Aliu; Ralph; Hal Ritson; Michele Baduzzi; Little	2:55
16.	"A Second to Midnight" (with Kylie Minogue)	Minogue; Alexander; Sjølie; Biffco; Stannard; Blackwell	Stannard; Blackwell	3:27
17.	"Starstruck" (Kylie Minogue remix)	Alexander; Coffee; Ralph; Ledwidge; Minogue	Ralph; DetoNate	3:26
Total length:				53:14

New Year's Edition
No.	Title	Writer(s)	Producer(s)	Length
1.	"King"	Alexander; Michael Goldsworthy; Emre Türkmen; Andrew Smith; Ralph	Ralph; Years & Years; Andy Smith^{[a]}	3:35
2.	"Shine"	Alexander; Goldsworthy; Türkmen; Greg Kurstin; Ralph	Years & Years; Ralph	4:15
3.	"If You're Over Me"	Alexander; Ralph; Steve McCutcheon	Steve Mac	3:09
4.	"Desire"	Alexander; Goldsworthy; Türkmen; Thomas Hull	Ralph; Two Inch Punch; Years & Years^{[a]}	3:26
5.	"Sanctify"	Alexander; Hull	Kid Harpoon	3:12
6.	"Play" (with Jax Jones)	Alexander; Ralph; Timucin Aluo; Uzoechi Emenike	Jax Jones; Ralph	3:06
7.	"It's a Sin" (with Elton John)	Neil Tennant; Chris Lowe	Pet Shop Boys; Stuart Price	4:44
Total length:				1:15:46

Note

- ^{^[a]} signifies an additional producer.
- ^{^[v]} signifies a vocal producer.

== Personnel ==
Credits based on the deluxe edition track listing.

=== Musicians ===
- Olly Alexander – vocals (all tracks), background vocals (14)
- Mark Ralph – bass, percussion, programming, keyboards (tracks 1–12, 16); guitar, synthesizers (1–11, 16); drums (1–11)
- DetoNate – drum programming, keyboards (tracks 2, 4, 5, 9, 14); bass, guitar (2, 4, 14)
- Dan Grech-Marguerat – additional programming (track 2), programming (16)
- Georgia – drum programming, keyboards (track 10)
- Joel Little – bass, drum programming, keyboards, synthesizers (track 13)
- Clarence Coffee Jr. – background vocals (track 14)
- Kylie Minogue – vocals (tracks 15, 16)
- Biff Stannard – bass, drums, guitar, percussion, programming (track 15)
- Duck Blackwell – bass, drums, guitar, percussion, programming (track 15)

=== Technical ===
- Chris Gehringer – mastering (tracks 1, 3–5, 7–14, 16)
- John Davis – mastering (track 2)
- Cass Irvine – mastering (track 6)
- Dick Beetham – mastering (track 15)
- Dan Grech-Marguerat – mixing (tracks 1–5, 7–11, 13, 16)
- Niklas Flyckt – mixing (track 6)
- Mark Ralph – mixing (tracks 12, 14), engineering (1–11)
- Josh Green – engineering (tracks 12, 14), engineering assistance (1–11)
- Gemma Chester – engineering (tracks 12, 14), engineering assistance (tracks 1–11, 14)
- Joel Little – engineering (track 13)
- Biff Stannard – engineering (track 15)
- Duck Blackwell – engineering (track 15)
- Kylie Minogue – engineering (track 15)
- Luke Burgoyne – mixing assistance (tracks 1–5, 7–11, 13, 16)
- Charles Haydon Hicks – mixing assistance (tracks 1–5, 7–11, 13, 16)

=== Visuals ===
- Nick Royal – creative direction
- Dan Craig – cover painting
- Hugo Yangüela – photography
- Casey Roarty – design

== Charts ==
=== Weekly charts ===
Weekly chart performance for Night Call
Chart (2022)	Peak position
Australian Albums (ARIA)	88
Belgian Albums (Ultratop Flanders)	15
Belgian Albums (Ultratop Wallonia)	12
French Albums (SNEP)	134
German Albums (Offizielle Top 100)	47
Irish Albums (Official Charts)	19
Scottish Albums (Official Charts)	2
Spanish Albums (Promusicae)	39
Swiss Albums (Schweizer Hitparade)	62
UK Albums (Official Charts)	1
US Top Album Sales (Billboard)	65
US Top Dance Albums (Billboard)	5

=== Year-end charts ===
Year-end chart performance for Night Call
Chart (2022)	Position
UK Albums (OCC)	81

== Certifications ==
Certification for Night Call
Region	Certification	Certified units/sales
United Kingdom (BPI)	Gold	100,000^{‡}
^{‡} Sales+streaming figures based on certification alone.

== Release history ==
Release dates and formats for Night Call
Region	Date	Version	Format	Label	Ref.
Various	21 January 2022	Standard; deluxe; New Year's	CD; LP; cassette	Polydor	
Various	21 January 2022	Standard; deluxe; New Year's	Digital download; streaming	Polydor	
Japan	16 February 2022	Japanese Deluxe	CD	Universal Music Japan	
