= Luke Fono =

English music producer (born 1990)

- Born: Luke Fono; 26 November 1990 (age 34)
- Origin: Brighton, United Kingdom
- Genres: UK garage; house; electronic
- Occupations: Record producer; Disc jockey
- Years active: 2015–present
- Labels: Method; Polydor; Relentless; Interscope; Ultra
- Website: fono.co.uk

Luke Fono, known professionally as Fono (born 26 November 1990), is an English record producer, electronic dance musician, and DJ from Brighton. He is best known for his 2015 single "Real Joy", which was described as one of the dance songs of the summer. "Real Joy" received support from BBC Radio 1 and BBC Radio 1Xtra DJs, including MistaJam, Danny Howard, Annie Mac, Nick Grimshaw, and Zane Lowe.

== Career ==
=== 2015–present: Breakthrough ===
Fono, released his debut single, "Real Joy", on Relentless Records on 12 June 2015. The song brought Fono to mainstream attention after receiving national airplay and when other DJs such as Duke Dumont, Calvin Harris and The Magician championed the song. Annie Mac included "Real Joy" on her sixth compilation album Annie Mac Presents 2015. The official video for "Real Joy" was premiered by The Fader on 28 April 2015 and attracted some mild controversy due to its violent content. However, the video was well received online and was subsequently nominated for "Best Dance Video -UK" in the UK Music Video Awards 2015.

In June 2015, Fono was revealed as the support act for Duke Dumont on his UK September tour.

Fono's second single, "Everybody Knows", was released in November 2015.

== Discography ==
=== Singles ===
Year	Song	Label
2015	"Real Joy"	Relentless/Ultra
2015	"Everybody Knows"	Youthemic
2016	"Feet on the Ground"	Polydor/Interscope
2017	"Allison" (collaboration with Karma Kid)	Method

=== EPs ===
Year	Song	Label
2016	"Kinetic"	Polydor/Interscope
2017	"Allison/Candyland" (collaboration with Karma Kid)	Method

=== Other appearances ===
Year	Song	Album	Label
2016	"Up / Down" (with NVOY)	(Red Bull Studios Presents: Monki & Friends EP 4)	Red Bull

=== Remixes ===
Year	Song	Artist
2015	"Teach Me"	Joey Bada$$ & Kiesza
2015	"Lean On"	Major Lazer & DJ Snake (featuring MØ)
2015	"The Giver (Reprise)"	Duke Dumont
2015	"Show Some Love"	TC (featuring Little Grace)
2015	"Castle (Magic)"	salute
2015	"You're The Best"	Wet
2015	"I Found U"	Axwell (featuring Max'C)
2016	"Desire"	Years & Years (featuring Tove Lo)
2016	"Meant To Be"	SG Lewis
2016	"Serious"	Anna Straker
2016	"Electric"	Alice Jemima
2017	"We Will Be"	Wilkinson (featuring Matt Wills)
2017	"Einzelhaft" (with salute)	Falco
2017	"Fire With Fire"	Femme
2017	"Turn Up Your Love"	AlunaGeorge
2017	"Tribalist (Get To Know)"	iLL BLU (featuring Glowie)
2017	"Waterfall" (with Karma Kid)	Petit Biscuit (featuring Panama)
