= Signals (song) =

2021 single by Regard and Kwabs

Single by Regard and Kwabs
- Released: 29 October 2021
- Genre: Dance; deep house
- Length: 2:47
- Label: Ministry of Sound
- Songwriter(s): Regard; Kwabs; Alexander Shuckburgh; Ben Drew
- Producer(s): Regard

Regard singles chronology
| "You" (2021) | "Signals" (2021) | "Hallucination" (2022) |

Kwabs singles chronology
| "My Own" (2015) | "Signals" (2021) |

Alternative covers
- Acoustic version of "Signals"

Music video
- "Signals" on YouTube

"Signals" is a song by Kosovo-Albanian disc jockey Regard and English singer and songwriter Kwabs. It was produced by Regard, who served as a co-writer with Kwabs, Alexander Shuckburgh and Ben Drew. The song was released as a single for digital download and streaming by Ministry of Sound on 29 October 2021. It is an English-language dance and deep house song with EDM elements. The song received critical acclaim from music critics, who praised the music as well as Regard's production and Kwabs' vocal delivery. It reached the top 10 in Bulgaria and the US Billboard Dance/Mix Show Airplay ranking. An accompanying music video was uploaded to Regard's YouTube channel on 12 November 2021, which tells the story of someone who keep the protagonist from leaving a party.

== Background and composition ==
Ministry of Sound released "Signals" as a single for digital download and streaming in various countries on 29 October 2021. The song was produced by Regard, who wrote it with Kwabs alongside Alexander Shuckburgh and Ben Drew. Musically, "Signals" is an English-language EDM-inspired dance and deep house song, fusing deep basslines, syncopated piano chords and synth riffs. Talking about their collaboration, Kwabs elaborated:

"I recorded the vocal for 'Signals' so long ago that it was crazy to think I'd ever be hearing it on the radio. It just goes to show that sometimes you can't keep a good song down. Huge kudos goes to Regard; he really transformed it into something new. And now it's this whole mad, amazing, emotional dance record. I can't wait for people to hear it."

== Reception ==
Upon release, "Signals" was met with critical acclaim from music critics. Philip Logan for CelebMix complimented Kwabs' "powerful and soulful" vocal delivery and the song's music, describing it "an infectious and energising [...] anthem" that according to him "looks set to go down a storm and parties and in clubs". On a similar note, Sywen Hartwig from Westdeutscher Rundfunk (WDR) also praised the singer's "emotional" vocals as well as the song's "energetic" music. Writing for Radio FG, Antony Harari further declared the song as a "new quality production" in Regard's discography, containing "captivating deep house [elements] that characterises him". Commercially, "Signals" reached number two on the US Billboard Dance/Mix Show Airplay ranking as well as the top 10 in Bulgaria.

== Promotion ==
To accompany the release, a lyric video for "Signals" was uploaded to Regard's YouTube channel on 29 October 2021. The official music video for the song followed on the aforementioned platform on 12 November. Regarding the concept, its director Stephen Agnew stated: "The story [of the music video] is simple: dead-eyed gorgeous people keep the protagonist from ever leaving a party [...] crashing an inward-looking indie concept into the side of a massive dance video, balancing the two worlds, without leaning too hard on either." Edited to appear as one continuous shot, the video begins with Kwabs in front of a brightly illuminated window next to a group of females in a dark, lighted bedroom. It then moves into a scene of the singer from above, walking to another room until he falls down on a bed. The latter shot is followed by the camera further traversing to a different room filled with television monitors, which display Kwabs from his room. Scenes interspersed throughout the main plot portray Regard performing in a dark surrounding and Kwabs along his fellow female companions, who lay and dance next to him.

== Track listing ==
- Digital download and streaming
1. "Signals" – 2:47
- Digital download and streaming – Acoustic
1. "Signals" (Acoustic) – 3:18

== Charts ==
=== Weekly charts ===
Weekly chart performance for "Signals"
| Chart (2021) | Peak position |
|---|---|
| Bulgaria (PROPHON) | 9 |
| US Dance/Mix Show Airplay (Billboard) | 2 |

=== Year-end charts ===
Year-end chart performance for "Signals"
| Chart (2022) | Position |
|---|---|
| US Dance/Mix Show Airplay (Billboard) | 26 |

== Release history ==
Release dates and formats for "Signals"
| Region | Date | Format(s) | Label(s) | Ref. |
|---|---|---|---|---|
| Various | 29 October 2021 | Digital download; streaming | Ministry of Sound | |
| Italy | 29 October 2021 | Radio airplay | Sony | |
