= A Second to Midnight =

2021 song by Kylie Minogue and Years & Years

Single by Kylie Minogue and Years & Years

from the album Disco: Guest List Edition
- Released: 6 October 2021
- Recorded: 2021
- Studio: Infinite Disco (Melbourne, Australia); Jaws On the Floor (London, England); Play Deep (London, England)
- Genre: Disco; dance-pop
- Length: 3:27
- Label: Darenote; BMG
- Songwriters: Kylie Minogue; Richard "Biff" Stannard; Duck Blackwell; Olly Alexander; Martin Sjølie
- Producers: Biff Stannard; Duck Blackwell

Kylie Minogue singles chronology
| "Starstruck (Kylie Minogue Remix)" (2021) | "A Second to Midnight" (2021) | "Kiss of Life" (2021) |

Years & Years singles chronology
| "Crave" (2021) | "A Second to Midnight" (2021) | "Sweet Talker" (2021) |

Music video
- "A Second to Midnight" on YouTube

"A Second to Midnight" is a song by Australian singer-songwriter Kylie Minogue and English singer-songwriter Olly Alexander, performing under his solo project Years & Years. The song was released on 6 October 2021. It serves as the lead single of Minogue's reissue album Disco: Guest List Edition, the re-release of her fifteenth studio album Disco (2020). The song is also included on the deluxe version of Years & Years' third studio album Night Call (2022) and featured as the intro music for the Night Call Tour. It marks the second collaboration between Minogue and Alexander following "Starstruck".

== Track listing ==
- Digital download and streaming (Jodie Harsh Remix)
1. "A Second to Midnight" (Jodie Harsh Remix) – 3:30
- Digital download (Jodie Harsh Remix; Beatport version)
1. "A Second to Midnight" (Jodie Harsh Extended) – 4:24
2. "A Second to Midnight" (Jodie Harsh Dub) – 4:24

== Charts ==
Chart performance for "A Second to Midnight"
| Chart (2021) | Peak position |
|---|---|
| Australia Airplay (Radiomonitor) | 43 |
| Hungary (Single Top 40) | 37 |
| Japan Hot Overseas (Billboard) | 8 |
| UK Singles Downloads (Official Charts) | 13 |
| UK Physical Singles (OCC) | 1 |
| UK Indie (Official Charts) | 27 |
| US Hot Dance/Electronic Songs (Billboard) | 26 |

== Release history ==
Release dates and formats for "A Second to Midnight"
| Region | Date | Format | Label | Ref. |
|---|---|---|---|---|
| Various | 6 October 2021 | Digital download; streaming | BMG; Darenote | |
| United States | 12 October 2021 | Dance radio | BMG | |
| Various | 12 November 2021 | CD single | BMG; Darenote | |
