= Roy Kafri =

Israeli artist, comedian, and musician (born 1985)

- רועי כפרי
- Born: November 12, 1985 (age 40); Nahalal, Israel
- Occupations: Comedian, Actor, Musician
- Years active: 2007–present

Roy Kafri (Hebrew: רועי כפרי; born November 12, 1985) is an Israeli artist, comedian, and musician. His various projects have been well received on the web and have become viral hits. Kafri co-created with Niv Majar the web series Nitza Ve’Lechem. He participated in several musical projects. Kafri also starred in a mini-series "Bekitzur" as part of the 10th season of the Israeli show Eretz Nehederet. He created and starred in the TV series "Yekumot".

== Early life ==
Roy Kafri was born in 1986 in moshav Nahalal, an agricultural Jewish community in northern Israel. During Kafri’s mandatory military service in the Israel Defense Forces, he served as a military photographer for its Intelligence Corps.

== Career ==
His first viral video, Chole Ba'rosh (sick in the head), was shot during his military service. The video released in 2007 received over 50,000 views and was Kafri’s first internet success. One of the founders of the Flix website saw the video and hired Kafri as a video editor. On the job, Kafri met Niv Majar and the two started shooting sketches under the name "Nitza Ve’Lechem". Their humor was surreal and absurd. The show gathered a cult following online and the two were called "The godfathers of Israeli web comedy" by Time Out Tel Aviv. The show had guest appearances from author Meir Shalev, comedians Assi Cohen and Tal Friedman, singer Shimi Tavori and others.

While working at Flix, Kafri also created the hit web series Hatulanovela, a cat soap opera, garnering millions of views for its 30 or so episodes. After becoming a success, 10 episodes from Hatulanovela were dubbed in English and released under the name Gatonovela. In 2012 Kafri collaborated with director Vania Heymann for the first time. The two created a Pepsi Max ad starring Kafri. The two went on to create a music video for "Yes I did approach Ido" a song from Kafri’s music project "Porch songs" with comedian Tal Tirangel. The two also co-directed an ad starring Israeli supermodel Bar Refaeli, this video also received over half a million views. In 2013, Israeli comedy show Eretz Nehederet aired a mini-series called "Bekitzur" starring Kafri, and co-created by him and Heymann. The show was an adaptation of the French Format "Bref". The mini-series is composed of thirteen 2-minute episodes. In 2014 Kafri released "Mayokero" a track from his online album- "Acowpella Beatbox", the track was accompanied by a video created by Vania Heymann. The track and video were mentioned in major media outlets including Rolling Stone Magazine.

Kafri has also released a few personal videos that received online attention. Among these are two videos starring his nieces, one made for his brother's wedding "They should have fun in their country" and the other "Lior’s Turn". His Honeymoon video "8 Honeymoon Moments" was also viewed over 100k times.

In April 2021, he was nominated for the "Best Supporting Actor in a Comedy Series" award at the 2020 Israeli Television Academy Awards for his role in the second season of Kacha Ze.

In November 2025, Kafri's first TV series, Yekumot, was aired on KAN.

In May 2026, Yekumot was awarded two prizes at the Israeli Television Academy Awards. Kafri himself won a prize for "Best Actor in a Comedy", and Alon Abutbul was awarded "Best Supporting Actor in a Comedy".

== Videography ==
=== Television ===
- 2012 - Nitza Ve’lechem on Comedy Central Israel
- 2013 - Bekizur
- 2016 - Roy's & Noah's Kids Tape

=== Web ===
- 2007-2015 - Nitza Ve’lechem
- 2011 - Catonovela

=== Music ===
- 2012 - Roy Kafri and Tal Tirangel - Yes I Did Approach Ido
- 2014 - Roy Kafri - Mayokero
- 2019 - Roy Kafri and Tal Tirangel - Shirey Mirpeset (album)

=== Commercials ===
- 2010 - Egged Bus Company- Interactive web game
- 2012 - Pepsi Max BeatBox
- 2012 - MyCheck ft. Bar Refaeli
- 2013 - Get out the vote video
- 2013 - Yevvo
- 2016 - Coca-Cola & Marvel Super Bowl Commercial (Interactive Version)
- 2016 - Milky Mousse Commercial

== Personal life ==
Kafri is married to Sigal and a father of three children. His mother's cousin is the writer and publicist Meir Shalev, and his uncle is Knesset member Ram Ben-Barak. In 2021, after 18 years of living in Tel Aviv, including three years in Brooklyn, he returned with his family to his childhood moshav Nahalal.
