= Starstruck (Years & Years song) =

2021 single by Years & Years

Single by Years & Years

from the album Night Call
- Released: 8 April 2021
- Genre: Synth-pop
- Length: 3:27
- Label: Polydor
- Songwriters: Clarence Coffee Jr.; Mark Ralph; Nathaniel Ledwidge; Olly Alexander
- Producers: DetoNate; Mark Ralph

Years & Years singles chronology
"It's a Sin" (2021)	"Starstruck" (2021)	"The Edge of Glory" (2021)

Kylie Minogue singles chronology
"Real Groove" (2020)	"Starstruck (Kylie Minogue Remix)" (2021)	"A Second to Midnight" (2021)

Music video
- "Starstuck" on YouTube

"Starstruck" is a song by British musician Olly Alexander, released under his solo project Years & Years. It was released for digital download and streaming on 8 April 2021. The song was written by Clarence Coffee Jr., Mark Ralph, Nathaniel Ledwidge and Olly Alexander, and marks the first release of Years & Years as Alexander's solo project following the departure of Mikey Goldsworthy and Emre Türkmen. A remix featuring Australian singer Kylie Minogue was released on 21 May 2021. On 15 February 2022, a remix featuring Japanese singer SIRUP was released.

== Background ==
On 29 March 2021, Olly Alexander uploaded a preview of the single on his TikTok account, and shared the news on his other social media accounts. He also introduced a 'Starstruck Challenge', explaining it as "all about showing your finest post-lockdown glow up that is leaving everyone star-struck because you look so fine".

In a statement, Alexander explained that the track "came together one night at a studio in the countryside outside of London" and that he has been "putting all" his "pent up energy" into music because of the COVID-19 lockdowns. He further elaborated that "'Starstruck' is about the rush you get when you're with somebody you're really into, it's about holding onto a good feeling and not letting it go. Like most of us I've spent the past year at home, and I wanted to create something super positive and fun for people (and myself) to bop along to."

On 18 May 2021, Years & Years confirmed a remix of "Starstruck" featuring Kylie Minogue. On 21 May 2021, the remix was released and featured new vocals by Minogue. A CD single including Kylie Minogue remix and original version was released on 4 June 2021.

The remix with Minogue was picked by Billboard as one of the 25 Best Pride Songs of 2021, stating the singers "trade lines on the bubbly verses and come together to belt the luminous, oh-so-catchy chorus for the burst of serotonin we’ve all been desperately seeking over the past year."

== Music video ==
A music video to accompany the release of "Starstruck" was first released on YouTube on 12 April 2021. The video was directed by Fred Rowson. It features Alexander being romantically pursued around a large house by a clone of himself. Near the end of the video, it is revealed that the incident was Alexander's imagination and he was really admiring his reflection before performing a series of dance moves in a large room.

== Live performances ==
On 16 April 2021, Alexander performed the song live on The Graham Norton Show and The One Show. On 25 April, he performed again on Sunday Brunch and at The Late Late Show with James Corden on 28 April. It was performed as the opening to the 2021 British Academy Television Awards. It was included as part of the setlist of Alexander's 2022 Night Call Tour as the final song before the encore.

== Personnel ==
Credits adapted from Tidal.

- DetoNate – producer, co-producer
- Mark Ralph – producer, composer, lyricist, associated performer, bass, co-producer, executive producer, guitar, music production, percussion, programming, synthesizer
- Clarence Coffee Jr. – composer, lyricist, associated performer, music production
- Nathaniel Ledwidge – composer, lyricist
- Olly Alexander – composer, lyricist, associated performer, vocals
- Dan Grech-Marguerat – associated performer, mixer, programming, studio personnel
- Charles Haydon Hicks – assistant recording engineer, studio personnel
- Luke Burgoyne – assistant recording engineer, studio personnel
- Gemma Chester – engineer, studio personnel
- Josh Green – engineer, studio personnel
- John Davis – mastering engineer, studio personnel

== Charts and certifications ==
Chart performance for "Starstruck"
Chart (2021)	Peak position
Australia Airplay (Radiomonitor)	38
Belgium (Ultratip Bubbling Under Flanders)	30
Croatia (HRT)	18
Czech Republic Airplay (ČNS IFPI)	43
Euro Digital Song Sales (Billboard)	11
Iceland (Tónlistinn)	40
Ireland (IRMA)	55
Japan Hot Overseas (Billboard)	5
New Zealand Hot Singles (RMNZ)	24
San Marino (SMRRTV Top 50)	23
Slovakia Airplay (ČNS IFPI)	43
UK Singles (OCC)	31
US Hot Dance/Electronic Songs (Billboard)	18

=== Certifications ===
Certifications for "Starstruck"
Region	Certification	Certified units/sales
United Kingdom (BPI)	Silver	200,000^{‡}
^{‡} Sales+streaming figures based on certification alone.

== Release history ==
Release history for "Starstruck"
Region	Date	Format	Version	Label	Ref.
Various	8 April 2021	Digital download; streaming	Original	Polydor	
Italy	9 April 2021	Contemporary hit radio	Original	Universal	
Various	23 April 2021	Digital download; streaming	Paul Woolford remix	Polydor	
Various	30 April 2021	Digital download; streaming	Ofenbach remix	Polydor	
Various	7 May 2021	Digital download; streaming	Vegyn remix	Polydor	
Various	21 May 2021	Digital download; streaming	Kylie Minogue remix	Polydor	
United Kingdom	4 June 2021	CD single	Original; Kylie Minogue remix; Paul Woolford remix; acoustic	Polydor	
