= Sunlight (The Magician song) =

Single by The Magician featuring Years & Years
- Released: 26 September 2014
- Recorded: 2014
- Genre: House
- Length: 3:29
- Label: FFRR
- Songwriters: Stephen Fasano; Olly Alexander; Mark Ralph
- Producer: The Magician

The Magician singles chronology
"When the Night Is Over" (2013)	"Sunlight" (2014)	"Together" (2015)

Years & Years singles chronology
"Take Shelter" (2014)	"Sunlight" (2014)	"Desire" (2014)

"Sunlight" is a song by Belgian DJ and record producer The Magician which features guest vocals from Olly Alexander of the English synth-pop band Years & Years. The song was released in the United Kingdom as a digital download on 28 September 2014. The song was written by Stephen Fasano, Olly Alexander, and Mark Ralph. The song was used in the 2015 film We Are Your Friends.

== Music video ==
The official music video was unveiled on 22 August 2014. It is set on a beach.

== Live performances ==
The Magician and Years & Years performed the song at the 2014 MTV Europe Music Awards in Glasgow, Scotland as part of the Digital Show. It was performed live during Years & Years' 2022 Night Call Tour.

== Charts ==
=== Weekly charts ===
Chart (2014)	Peak position
Australia (ARIA)	20
Belgium (Ultratop 50 Flanders)	7
Belgium Dance (Ultratop Flanders)	1
Belgium (Ultratop 50 Wallonia)	11
Belgium Dance (Ultratop Wallonia)	4
France (SNEP)	184
Ireland (IRMA)	57
Netherlands (Dutch Top 40)	22
Netherlands (Single Top 100)	37
Poland (Dance Top 50)	38
Scotland Singles (OCC)	7
Slovenia (SloTop50)	40
UK Singles (OCC)	7
UK Dance (OCC)	3
US Dance/Mix Show Airplay (Billboard)	17

=== Year-end charts ===
Chart (2014)	Position
Belgium (Ultratop Flanders)	71
Belgium (Ultratop Wallonia)	100
Netherlands (Dutch Top 40)	91

== Certifications ==
Region	Certification	Certified units/sales
Australia (ARIA)	Gold	35,000^{^}
Belgium (BRMA)	Gold	15,000^{*}
Netherlands (NVPI)	Platinum	30,000^{‡}
United Kingdom (BPI)	Gold	400,000^{‡}
^{*} Sales figures based on certification alone.^{^} Shipments figures based on certification alone.^{‡} Sales+streaming figures based on certification alone.

== Release history ==
Region	Date	Format	Label
Ireland	26 September 2014	Digital download	FFRR
United Kingdom	28 September 2014	Digital download	FFRR
