= Regard (DJ) =

Kosovo-Albanian DJ and record producer (born 1993)

- Born: Dardan Aliu; 23 July 1993 (age 33); Ferizaj, FR Yugoslavia (present-day Kosovo)
- Genre: EDM
- Occupations: DJ; record producer
- Years active: 2016–present
- Label: Ministry of Sound
- Website: djregardofficial.com

Dardan Aliu (born 23 July 1993), known professionally as Regard, is a Kosovo-Albanian DJ and record producer. Born and raised in Ferizaj, he made his international breakthrough in 2019 with his cover of Jay Sean's 2008 single "Ride It", which resulted in commercial success worldwide.

== Life and career ==
Regard was born as Dardan Aliu on 23 July 1993 into an Albanian family in the city of Ferizaj, Kosovo. He rose to prominence with the release of a house cover of the Jay Sean song "Ride It", which received 4.1 million views on TikTok. DJ Regard was signed to the Ministry of Sound and "Ride It" was released in July 2019. The single topped the Spotify Viral chart in the US, and eventually had over a million plays on Spotify. By the end of August 2019, the song had been streamed over 2.4 million times in the US and entered the Billboard Hot Dance/Electronic Songs chart at number 21. The single received heavy airplay in the UK, on BBC Radio 1, the BBC Asian Network, Kiss FM and Hits Radio. It eventually reached number 1 in the Ireland singles chart, number 2 on the UK Singles Chart, and number 3 in Australia. The Head of Music Partnerships at TikTok Europe highlighted Regard's success as a "great example of how TikTok can support artists by providing a platform to promote their songs to a global audience." Regard was booked to play the BBC's Top of the Pops New Year's Eve special with Jay Sean, on 30 December 2019.

DJ Regard told Headliner Magazine that the "Ride It" remix came to him when he was drunk: "I was very drunk returning to my apartment from my gig, and I was listening to Jay Sean's song. The rattling in my head from the sound system at my gig made the perfect combination to make the track! The moment I arrived home, I started to form the basic idea for the 'Ride It' remix."

Regard released the follow-up single "Secrets" with British singer-songwriter Raye on 23 April 2020. The single would peak inside the top 10 of the UK Singles Chart and become certified silver in the same country. The single would also peak inside the top 20 of numerous European countries such as the Netherlands, Belgium and Poland.

== Discography ==
=== Singles ===
List of singles, with selected chart positions and certifications
Title	Year	Peak chart positions										Certifications	Album
Title	Year	AUS	BEL (FL)	DEN	FRA	GER	NL	NZ	SWI	UK	US	Certifications	Album
"Ride It"	2019	3	2	6	13	4	9	8	2	2	62	ARIA: 7× Platinum; BEA: 2× Platinum; BPI: 3× Platinum; BVMI: 2× Platinum; IFPI DEN: 2× Platinum; IFPI SWI: 2× Platinum; RIAA: Platinum; RMNZ: 5× Platinum; SNEP: Diamond	Non-album single
"Secrets" (with Raye)	2020	24	17	20	68	84	17	—	85	6	— (Note: "Secrets" did not enter the Billboard Hot 100 chart, but peaked at number eight on the Hot Dance/Electronic Songs Chart.)	ARIA: Platinum; BEA: Gold; BPI: Platinum; BVMI: Gold; IFPI DEN: Platinum; RMNZ: Gold; SNEP: Platinum	Euphoric Sad Songs
"Say My Name" (with Dimitri Vegas & Like Mike)	2020	—	27	—	—	—	—	—	—	—	—		Non-album singles
"You" (with Troye Sivan and Tate McRae)	2021	51	50	—	—	—	30	— (Note: "You" did not enter the New Zealand Singles Chart, but peaked at number three on the New Zealand Hot Singles Chart.)	—	46	58	BPI: Silver; IFPI DEN: Gold; RIAA: Platinum; RMNZ: Gold	Non-album singles
"Signals" (with Kwabs)	2021	—	—	—	—	—	—	—	—	—	— (Note: "Signals" did not enter the Billboard Hot 100 chart, but peaked at number two on the Dance/Mix Show Airplay Chart.)		Non-album singles
"Hallucination" (with Years & Years)	2022	—	—	—	—	—	—	— (Note: "Hallucination" did not enter the New Zealand Singles Chart, but peaked at number 39 on the New Zealand Hot Singles Chart.)	—	56	— (Note: "Hallucination" did not enter the Billboard Hot 100 chart, but peaked at number 28 on the Hot Dance/Electronic Songs Chart.)	BPI: Silver	Night Call (Deluxe)
"No Love for You" (with Drop-G)	2022	—	—	—	—	—	—	—	—	—	— (Note: "No Love for You" did not enter the Billboard Hot 100 chart, but peaked at number 38 on the Hot Dance/Electronic Songs Chart.)		Non-album singles
"New York" (with Steve Aoki and Mazie)	2023	—	—	—	—	—	—	—	—	—	— (Note: "New York" did not enter the Billboard Hot 100 chart, but peaked at number 32 on the Hot Dance/Electronic Songs Chart.)		Non-album singles
"No Sleep" (with Ella Henderson)	2023	—	—	—	—	—	—	—	—	—	—		Non-album singles
"Can't Stop Us"	2024	—	—	—	—	—	—	—	—	—	—		Non-album singles
"Stay Another Night" (with Cheat Codes)	2024	—	—	—	—	—	—	—	—	—	—		Non-album singles
"—" denotes a recording that did not chart or was not released in that territory.

== Awards and nominations ==
List of awards and nominations
Year	Award	Category	Recipient	Result	Ref.
2020	Los 40 Music Awards	Best International Dance Artist	Himself	Nominated	
2020	NRJ Music Award	DJ of the Year	Himself	Nominated	
2020	Berlin Music Video Awards	Best Cinematography	Ride It	Nominated	
2021	American Music Awards	Favorite Electronic/Dance Artist	Himself	Nominated	
2021	Brit Awards	Best Song of the Year	"Secrets"	Nominated	
2022	Billboard Music Awards	Top Dance/Electronic Song	"You"	Nominated	
2022	iHeartRadio Music Awards	Dance Artist of the Year	Regard	Nominated	
2022	iHeartRadio Music Awards	Dance Song of the Year	"You"		
