= Sweet Talker (song) =

Single by Years & Years and Galantis

from the album Night Call
- Released: 24 November 2021
- Genre: Dance-pop; disco; house
- Length: 2:56
- Label: Polydor; Universal Music
- Songwriters: Olly Alexander; Max Wolfgang; Mark Ralph; Christian Karlsson
- Producers: Mark Ralph; Bloodshy

Years & Years singles chronology
"A Second to Midnight" (2021)	"Sweet Talker" (2021)	"Hallucination" (2022)

Galantis singles chronology
"Tears for Later" (2021)	"Sweet Talker" (2021)	"Alien" (2021)

Music video
- "Sweet Talker" on YouTube

"Sweet Talker" is a song by English singer Olly Alexander, who performs under his solo project Years & Years, and Swedish electronic music duo Galantis. The song was released on 24 November 2021 as the third and final single from the former's third studio album Night Call (2022). The song was written by Alexander, Max Wolfgang, Max Ralph, and Christian Karlsson, while being produced by the latter two. Lyrically, the song finds Alexander searching for a "love-em-and-leave-em dreamboat he's not ready to forget, as lush disco flourishes coat his sensual, aching croon". Commercially, the song debuted at 94 on the UK Singles Chart, later peaking at 26, becoming the highest-charting single from Night Call.

== Music video ==
A music video for "Sweet Talker" premiered on YouTube on 10 December 2021, and was directed by Sophia Ray. Inspired by films Labyrinth (1986) and Gretel and Hansel (2020), the video shows Olly Alexander trapped in a magical castle by a mysterious and "sexy" beast. The video's concept is a take on the Greek mythical tale King Midas, with Alexander finding a magic sword in his escape through the castle that "turns anyone he slays into candy".

== Live performances ==
"Sweet Talker" was first performed at Capital FM's Jingle Bell Ball on 12 December 2021. It was also performed on BBC's 'The Big New Years & Years Eve Special' on 31 December 2021. It was performed on Alexander's Night Call Tour as the second song of the show.

== Track listings ==
Digital download and streaming – original

1. "Sweet Talker" – 2:56

Digital download and streaming – acoustic

1. "Sweet Talker" (acoustic) – 3:01
2. "Sweet Talker" – 2:56

Digital download and streaming – Navos remix

1. "Sweet Talker" (Navos Remix) – 2:39
2. "Sweet Talker" – 2:56

== Charts ==
Chart performance for "Sweet Talker"
Chart (2021–2022)	Peak position
Euro Digital Song Sales (Billboard)	18
Ireland (IRMA)	29
New Zealand Hot Singles (RMNZ)	33
San Marino (SMRRTV Top 50)	33
Sweden Heatseeker (Sverigetopplistan)	2
UK Singles (OCC)	26
US Hot Dance/Electronic Songs (Billboard)	21

== Certifications ==
Region	Certification	Certified units/sales
United Kingdom (BPI)	Gold	400,000^{‡}
^{‡} Sales+streaming figures based on certification alone.

== Release history ==
Release history for "Sweet Talker"
Region	Date	Format	Label	Ref.
Various	24 November 2021	Digital download; streaming	Polydor; Universal	
Italy	24 December 2021	Contemporary hit radio	Universal	
