= Crave (Years & Years song) =

2021 single by Years & Years

Single by Years & Years

from the album Night Call
- Released: 28 September 2021
- Genre: Dance-pop; electropop
- Length: 3:17
- Label: Polydor; Universal Music
- Songwriters: Olly Alexander; Mark Ralph
- Producers: Mark Ralph; DetoNate

Years & Years singles chronology
"The Edge of Glory" (2021)	"Crave" (2021)	"A Second to Midnight" (2021)

Music video
- "Crave" on YouTube

"Crave" is a song by English singer Olly Alexander, who performs under his solo project Years & Years. The song was released on 28 September 2021 as the second single from Years & Years' third studio album Night Call (2022). The song was written by Alexander and Mark Ralph and was produced by Ralph and DetoNate. Lyrically, the song focuses on desiring a lover and being attracted to the pain that they can cause you. The song was performed live during Alexander's Night Call Tour.

== Background ==
Of the song, Alexander explained that "Crave is a playful way of inhabiting the deranged sexual energy I’ve always wanted. In the past I felt like I’ve been dominated by toxic relationships, and I felt like it would be fun to turn it on its head". During an interview on Apple Music 1, he stated that "Crave" was the song from Night Call that he was most proud of, noting that "writing ‘Crave’ was a really good experience. Sometimes when you're song writing or you're going to all these sessions, it can feel like hard work, but then I don't know what happens. You get like a strike of inspiration and everything comes together and it flows in the moment. And the song just comes out of nowhere, just writes itself. And that was ‘Crave’. And it, for me, when I hear it, it's like this really sweet spot because it's kind of spooky, but it's also sexy. It's upbeat. It has a middle eight that takes you somewhere else. So yeah, I'm proud of this one".

Alexander revealed to Zane Lowe that "Crave" was partially inspired by ABBA, describing how the band's music would take the listener on a journey before shifting or changing and their tendency towards "weird story arcs" in their songs was something he wanted to channel on Night Call. He explained that "Crave is a good example of this slightly deranged sexual energy that kind of became a bit of a Muse, this character that I very much have been at different times, so that’s throughout the record. And I think it’s a little bit more assertive than maybe the previous ones", adding that " really wanted to go into this sort of twisted fantasy".

== Music video ==
The video for "Crave" premiered on YouTube on 28 September 2021, and was directed by Tom Beard. It has drawn comparisons to the 2009 science fiction film Avatar as it features Alexander painted entirely blue and wearing a crown of leaves on a dreamy, supernatural planet while fantastical forest creatures attempt to seduce him. Alexander noted that the video was a "mini It's a Sin reunion", as Omari Douglas, Nathaniel Curtis and David Carlyle, who starred alongside him in the 2021 drama series, as well as trans activitst Munroe Bergdorf, all makes appearances. PinkNews described it as "an otherworldly celebration of all things queer".

== Charts ==
Chart performance for "Crave"
Chart (2021–2022)	Peak position
Japan Hot Overseas (Billboard)	12
US Hot Dance/Electronic Songs (Billboard)	42
