= Communion (Years & Years album) =

Studio album by Years & Years
- Released: 10 July 2015
- Recorded: 2014–15
- Genres: Synth-pop; dance-pop
- Length: 48:26
- Labels: Polydor; Interscope
- Producers: Years & Years; Andy Smith; Mark Ralph; Two Inch Punch; TMS; Mike Spencer

Years & Years chronology
Y & Y EP (2015)	Communion (2015)	Palo Santo (2018)

Singles from Communion
- 1. "Real" Released: 17 February 2014; 2. "Take Shelter" Released: 18 August 2014; 3. "Desire" Released: 23 November 2014; 4. "King" Released: 27 February 2015; 5. "Worship" Released: 18 March 2015; 6. "Shine" Released: 5 July 2015; 7. "Eyes Shut" Released: 13 November 2015

Communion is the debut studio album by English synth-pop trio Years & Years. It was released on 10 July 2015 through Polydor Records for the United Kingdom and other countries and Interscope Records for the United States only. The album garnered a positive reception but critics felt there was derivativeness throughout the songs. Communion debuted at number one in the United Kingdom and spawned six singles: "Real", "Take Shelter", "Desire", "King", "Shine" and "Eyes Shut".

== Background ==
In 2014, the group signed to Polydor Records. In January 2015, Years & Years won the prestigious BBC Sound of 2015. The trio were also nominated for the Critics Choice Award for the 2015 Brit Awards.

The album's title and release date was announced on 18 March 2015, when it was made available to pre-order on iTunes.

== Singles ==
"Real" was released as the album's first single on 17 February 2014. Alexander said that some of the lyrics in "Real" were inspired by experiences he had with a former boyfriend: "When I met him, I was really wasted and I fell off a bin and had to go A&E because I sprained my wrist, so I put in the line, 'Broke my bones playing games with you'. And then I got this rash... That's where the line, 'I itch all night, I itch for you' comes from."

"Take Shelter" was released as the album's second single on 18 August 2014 and peaked at number 140 on the UK Singles Chart.

"Desire" was released on 23 November 2014 as the album's third single and peaked at number 22 on the UK Singles Chart.

"King" was released as the album's fourth single on 27 February 2015. The song debuted at number one on the UK Singles Chart, with a combined sales-streaming figure of 101,000 copies, and reached number three on the Irish Singles Chart. It is the group's signature song and biggest hit single to date. Alexander has stated many times that the hit song has a much darker meaning: "I was going out with a guy that was kind of a douche bag, but I still really liked him," explains Olly. "I know lots of people can related to this. It's a song about how it feels good to be treated badly by someone."

"Shine" was released as the album's fifth single on 5 July 2015 and debuted at number two on the UK Singles Chart.

"Eyes Shut" was released as the album's sixth single on 13 November 2015. A slower song Alexander has stated that he wrote the song when he was going through a period of depression Alexander has frequently spoken about his Mental Health, particularly that he struggles with depression, anxiety and when he was younger an eating disorder and self harm. He's confirmed he sees a private therapist and takes medication

A new version of "Desire" featuring Tove Lo was released on 4 March 2016.

== Critical reception ==
Professional ratings
Aggregate scores
Source	Rating
AnyDecentMusic?	6.3/10
Metacritic	68/100
Review scores
Source	Rating
AllMusic	4/5 stars
Billboard	3.5/5 stars
DIY	4/5 stars
The Guardian	3/5 stars
The Independent	3/5 stars
The Line of Best Fit	7.5/10
musicOMH	3.5/5 stars
NME	2/5 stars
Pitchfork	7.4/10
Spin	7/10

The album has received positive reviews. Communion received a score of 68 on Metacritic based on 18 professional reviews. In an enthusiastic review, AllMusic rated the album 4 out of 5 stars, highlighting the group's ability to skillfully bridge the "ambient '80s style synth-pop of M83 with the funky dancefloor grooves of Justin Timberlake" and transform their influences into something new. In another 4 out of 5 review, DIY praised singer Olly Alexander for managing to avoid cliché while tackling well-tread subjects such as heartbreak and loneliness, and remarks that the group adds a human touch to powerful pop anthems. Pitchfork, which rated the album a 7.4 out of 10, addressed potential critiques by remarking that while much of the album may seem familiar, Years & Years distills rather than dilutes the formula of "reimagined '80s and '90s club pop".

Multiple reviews, however, commented on the derivativeness of the songs with The Independent calling the album a "slick amalgamation of 2014's sounds". Alexis Petridis of The Guardian wrote that the group doesn't "seem to have an original idea in their collective heads", but still acknowledged that the album's "watertight" pop songwriting made it enjoyable. Jon Caramanica of The New York Times made a similar critique of the album, to which he referred as "diet-club music", but again praised the songwriting as excellent and effective. In an overall positive review, Billboard noted that the group has a "skill set, not a sound", particularly pointing out the album's strong melodies, emotional honesty and broad tastes. In mixed reviews, NME rated the album 2 out of 5 lamenting that the album had little to say and took no risks, while Drowned in Sound gave the album a 5 out of 10, writing that while many elements of the album were pleasant, overall it did not command listeners' attention.

== Commercial performance ==
Communion debuted at number one in the United Kingdom, outselling the rest of the top five combined in its first week of release. In the United States, the album debuted at number 47 selling 8,841 copies in its first week.

Communion sold over one million copies worldwide and became the fastest-selling debut in 2015 from a UK-signed band.

In the release of their second album Palo Santo, Communion re-entered the UK chart at 64 with sales over 1,212.

== Track listing ==
Communion – Standard edition
No.	Title	Writer(s)	Producer(s)	Length
1.	"Foundation"	Olly Alexander; Emre Turkmen; Michael Goldsworthy	Mark Ralph; Years & Years	2:58
2.	"Real"	Alexander; Turkmen; Goldsworthy	Years & Years; Andy Smith; Ralph	4:10
3.	"Shine"	Alexander; Turkmen; Goldsworthy; Greg Kurstin	Years & Years; Ralph	4:14
4.	"Take Shelter"	Alexander; Turkmen; Goldsworthy; Andrew Smith; Thomas Hull	Years & Years; Smith; Ralph	4:07
5.	"Worship"	Alexander; Turkmen; Goldsworthy; Hull; Thomas Barnes; Benjamin Kohn; Peter Kelleher	Ralph; Years & Years; TMS	3:40
6.	"Eyes Shut"	Alexander; Turkmen; Goldsworthy	Ralph; Years & Years; Two Inch Punch; Mike Spencer^{[a]}	3:18
7.	"Ties"	Alexander; Turkmen; Goldsworthy; Mark Ralph	Ralph; Years & Years	3:46
8.	"King"	Alexander; Turkmen; Goldsworthy; Ralph; Smith	Ralph; Years & Years; Smith^{[a]}	3:35
9.	"Desire"	Alexander; Turkmen; Goldsworthy; Hull	Ralph; Two Inch Punch; Years & Years^{[a]}	3:25
10.	"Gold"	Alexander; Turkmen; Goldsworthy; Ralph	Ralph; Years & Years	3:59
11.	"Without"	Alexander; Turkmen; Goldsworthy; Ralph	Ralph; Years & Years	3:30
12.	"Border"	Alexander; Turkmen; Goldsworthy	Ralph; Years & Years	4:22
13.	"Memo"	Alexander; Turkmen; Goldsworthy	Years & Years; Ralph	3:22
Total length:				48:26

Communion – Deluxe edition (bonus tracks)
No.	Title	Writer(s)	Producer(s)	Length
14.	"1977"	Alexander; Turkmen; Goldsworthy	Ralph; Years & Years	3:00
15.	"Ready for You" (Acoustic)	Alexander; Turkmen; Goldsworthy	Ralph; Years & Years	3:17
16.	"I Want to Love"	Alexander; Turkmen; Goldsworthy	Ralph; Years & Years	2:21
17.	"King" (Acoustic)	Alexander; Turkmen; Goldsworthy; Ralph; Smith		4:03
Total length:				61:07

Communion – Super deluxe edition (bonus tracks)
No.	Title	Writer(s)	Length
18.	"Breathe"	Andrea Martin; Ivan Matias; Richard Bembery; Melvin Bradford; Stefan Harris; Alvin Joiner; Marshall Mathers; Charles Aznavour	3:53
19.	"Desire" (BBC Live Lounge Version)	Alexander; Turkmen; Goldsworthy; Hull	3:17
Total length:			68:22

Communion – Super deluxe edition (7" vinyl)
No.	Title	Writer(s)	Producer(s)	Length
1.	"Eyes Shut" (Live in London)	Alexander; Turkmen; Goldsworthy	Ralph; Spencer
2.	"Don't Save Me" (BBC Live Lounge Version)	Este Haim; Danielle Haim; Alana Haim

Notes

- ^{^[a]} signifies an additional producer

== Charts and certifications ==
=== Weekly charts ===
Chart (2015)	Peak position
Australian Albums (ARIA)	5
Austrian Albums (Ö3 Austria)	24
Belgian Albums (Ultratop Flanders)	2
Belgian Albums (Ultratop Wallonia)	13
Canadian Albums (Billboard)	8
Czech Albums (ČNS IFPI)	56
Danish Albums (Hitlisten)	7
Dutch Albums (Album Top 100)	5
Finnish Albums (Suomen virallinen lista)	20
French Albums (SNEP)	39
German Albums (Offizielle Top 100)	16
Hungarian Albums (MAHASZ)	40
Irish Albums (IRMA)	1
Italian Albums (FIMI)	50
New Zealand Albums (RMNZ)	11
Norwegian Albums (VG-lista)	10
Polish Albums (ZPAV)	4
Scottish Albums (Official Charts)	1
South Korean Albums (Gaon)	66
South Korean International Albums (Gaon)	11
Spanish Albums (Promusicae)	33
Swedish Albums (Sverigetopplistan)	6
Swiss Albums (Schweizer Hitparade)	5
UK Albums (Official Charts)	1
UK Dance Albums (Official Charts)	1
US Billboard 200	47
US Top Dance Albums (Billboard)	1

=== Year-end charts ===
Chart (2015)	Position
Belgian Albums (Ultratop Flanders)	56
Danish Albums (Hitlisten)	100
UK Albums (OCC)	20
US Dance/Electronic Albums (Billboard)	24
Chart (2016)	Position
Danish Albums (Hitlisten)	78
UK Albums (OCC)	34

=== Certifications ===
Region	Certification	Certified units/sales
Austria (IFPI Austria)	Gold	7,500^{*}
Brazil (Pro-Música Brasil)	Gold	20,000^{‡}
Denmark (IFPI Danmark)	Platinum	20,000^{‡}
Mexico (AMPROFON)	Platinum	60,000^{‡}
Poland (ZPAV)	2× Platinum	40,000^{‡}
Sweden (GLF)	Gold	20,000^{‡}
United Kingdom (BPI)	2× Platinum	600,000^{‡}
^{*} Sales figures based on certification alone.^{‡} Sales+streaming figures based on certification alone.

== Release history ==
Country	Date	Edition	Format(s)	Label
Various	10 July 2015	Standard; deluxe; super deluxe	CD; digital download; LP	Polydor; Interscope
