= Eyes Shut =

Single by Olly Alexander (Years & Years)

from the album Communion
- Released: 13 November 2015
- Recorded: 2014–15
- Genre: Synth-pop; alternative R&B
- Length: 3:18 (album version); 3:24 (original mix)
- Label: Polydor; Interscope
- Songwriter(s): Oliver Alexander Thornton; Resul Emre Turkmen; Michael Thomas "Mikey" Goldsworthy; Mark Ralph
- Producer(s): Years & Years; Ralph; Two Inch Punch; Mike Spencer

Olly Alexander (Years & Years) singles chronology
"Shine" (2015)	"Eyes Shut" (2015)	"Desire" (2016)

"Eyes Shut" is a 2015 single by Years & Years. It was produced by Mike Spencer. Two remixes were released on 10 October 2015.

== Background ==
Describing the writing process, Alexander explained that "The song is about self preservation and wanting to hide from disaster. At the time I wrote it I was feeling very depressed so it was a bit more introspective than the other songs. I wrote it to be kind of a personal torch song".

== Music video ==
A music video was produced for the song. It shows frontman Olly Alexander musing the remains of a post-apocalyptic society. It was shot on the outskirts of Bulgaria's capital, Sofia. it was released on 28 September 2015. The director is Chino Moya.

== Track listing ==
Digital download – Remixes
No.	Title	Length
1.	"Eyes Shut" (Honne Remix)	3:48
2.	"Eyes Shut" (Sam Feldt Remix)	5:06
3.	"Eyes Shut" (Tei Shi Remix)	3:01
4.	"Eyes Shut" (Danny Dove Remix)	2:51

== Charts and certifications ==
=== Weekly charts ===
Chart (2015–16)	Peak position
Belgium (Ultratip Bubbling Under Flanders)	3
Ireland (IRMA)	25
Scotland (OCC)	11
Slovenia (SloTop50)	41
Sweden (Sverigetopplistan)	86
UK Singles (OCC)	17

=== Year-end charts ===
Chart (2016)	Position
UK Singles (Official Charts Company)	96

=== Certifications ===
Region	Certification	Certified units/sales
Denmark (IFPI Danmark)	Gold	45,000^{‡}
Poland (ZPAV)	Gold	10,000^{‡}
Sweden (GLF)	Gold	20,000^{‡}
United Kingdom (BPI)	Platinum	600,000^{‡}
^{‡} Sales+streaming figures based on certification alone.
