= King (Years & Years song) =

2015 single by Years & Years

Single by Years & Years

from the album Communion
- B-side: TCTS Remix (7", CD)
- Released: 27 February 2015
- Recorded: 2014
- Genre: Dance-pop; synth-pop; house
- Length: 3:35
- Label: Polydor; Interscope
- Songwriters: Michael Thomas Goldsworthy; Mark Ralph; Andrew Smith; Oliver Alexander Thornton; Resul Emre Turkmen
- Producers: Andy Smith; Years & Years

Years & Years singles chronology
"Desire" (2014)	"King" (2015)	"Shine" (2015)

Music video
- "King" on YouTube

"King" is a song by British synth-pop trio Years & Years from their debut studio album Communion. It was originally released as a single on 27 February 2015.

The song entered at the top of the UK Singles Chart with a combined sales-streaming figure of 101,000 copies, making it Years & Years' first number-one single, and biggest hit to date. Internationally, "King" peaked within the top ten of the charts in Australia, Austria, Bulgaria, Denmark, Germany, Luxembourg, the Netherlands, the Republic of Ireland and Switzerland.

== Background ==
In an interview with Rolling Stone, frontman Olly Alexander said: "When we recorded [the song], no one felt good about it. It sounds lame! And we could never fix it. We shelved it for awhile. When we came back to it, we just took a different approach: 'Let's try to make it an Eighties dance-pop track.' And we just started out with that, cut it all up, arranged it. Used that balearic flute vibe, like a bird in the forest." Synth player Mikey Goldsworthy revealed that the backing track "[is] actually Olly's voice sampled and fucked up."

"King" was released as the album's fourth single on 27 February 2015. The song debuted at number one on the UK Singles Chart, ending the prolonged run of Ellie Goulding’s single, “Love Me Like You Do” (2015). with a combined sales-streaming figure of 101,000 copies. It also reached number 3 on the Irish Singles Chart. Alexander has stated many times that the song has a much darker meaning: "I was going out with a guy that was kind of a douche bag, but I still really liked him". He further stated "I know lots of people can relate to this. It's a song about how it feels good to be treated badly by someone".

== Critical reception ==
"King" received critical acclaim. Billboard included "King" in its "Top 10 Songs of 2015 (So Far)" list in June 2015, stating "U.K. alt-pop trio Years & Years has yet to find a radio foothold in the States, but "King" sounds like it's destined to be played at arenas for years to come. When frontman Olly Alexander extends his arms and cries "Let go, let go, let go of everything" at the end of the single, it's almost impossible not to indulge in some type of uninhibited dance breakdown." Time named "King" the best song of 2015.

== Music video ==
The song's music video was directed by Nadia and choreographed by Ryan Heffington.

The video features Olly in an empty house with a couch being surrounded by backup dancers. The two other band members, Mickey and Emre are playing an electric keyboard in an empty pink room being surrounded by dancers. Olly levitates out of the house and walks down the street with the dancers following him. As they fumble with him, he plunges into an underground river where the dancers rise him back up to the house and they struggle with him until he is able to break them free and learn they were a hallucination.

== Live performances and covers ==
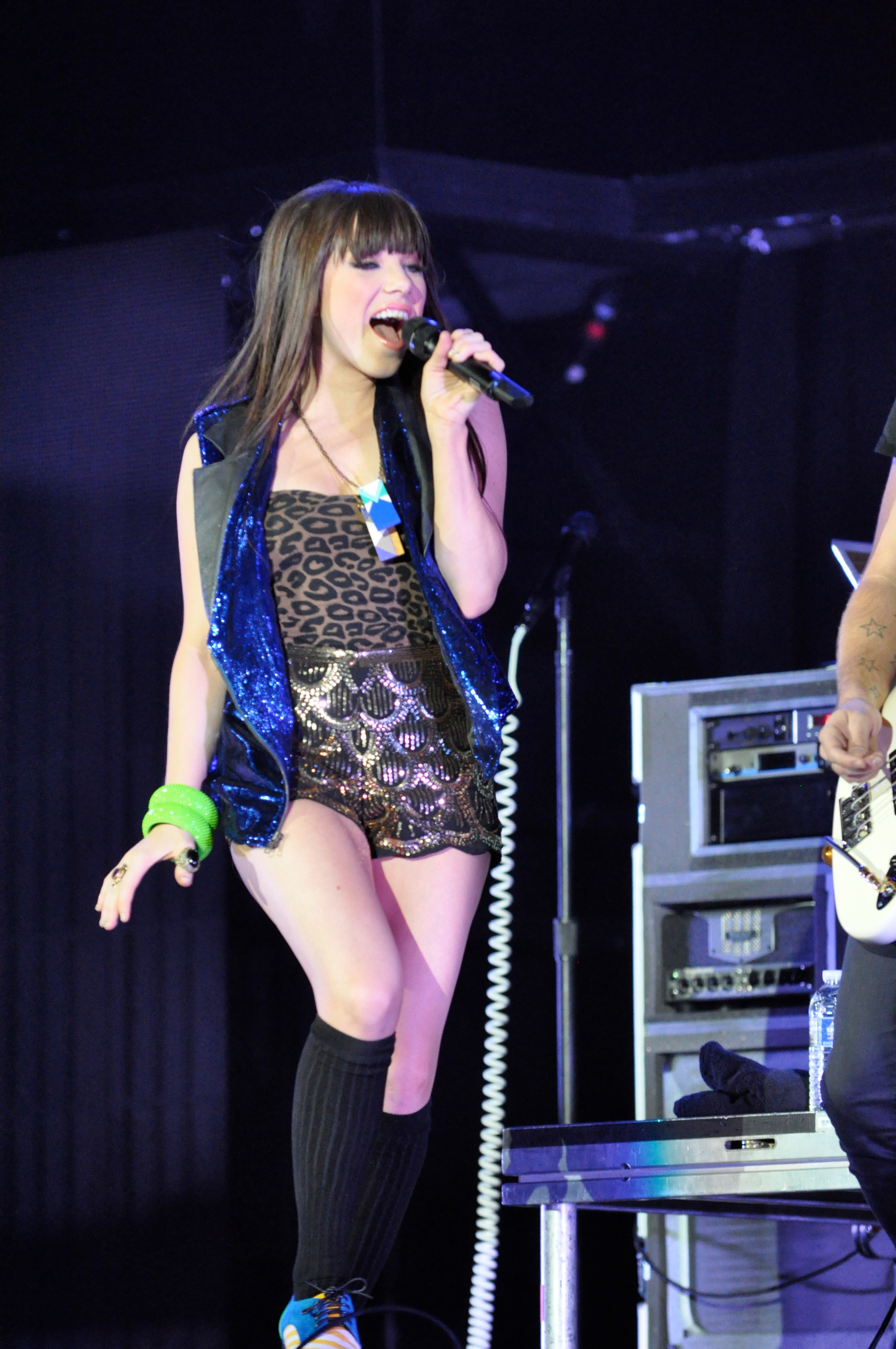
Carly Rae Jepsen covered the song on BBC Radio 1.

The band have performed the song on multiple TV shows including The Graham Norton Show (10 April), The Voice of Italy (27 May). They also performed the song as part of their set at Radio 1's Big Weekend (23 May), Glastonbury Festival (27 June), Wireless (5 July), T in the Park (11 July) and Latitude Festival (19 July). It is also the closing number on their Palo Santo Tour and Night Call Tour.

In April 2015, Nick Jonas performed an acoustic version of the song during Live Lounge on BBC Radio 1. The song was featured on the accompanied album. In September 2015, Canadian pop star Carly Rae Jepsen covered the song on BBC Radio 1.

== Track listing ==
- Digital download
1. "King" – 3:34
- Digital download – Remixes
1. "King" (The Magician Remix) – 4:00
2. "King" (TCTS Remix) – 3:45
3. "King" (Oceaán Remix) – 3:25
- Digital download – Remixes
1. "King" (Until the Ribbon Breaks Re-Imagination) – 4:02
2. "King" (Gryffin Remix) – 4:42
3. "King" (The Magician Remix) – 4:00
4. "King" (Arty Remix) – 4:23
5. "King" (Anevo Remix) – 3:28
6. "King" (Lenno Remix) – 5:16
7. "King" (TCTS Remix) – 3:45
8. "King" (Oceaán Remix) – 3:25

== Charts ==
=== Weekly charts ===
2015 weekly chart performance
Chart (2015)	Peak position
Australia (ARIA)	9
Austria (Ö3 Austria Top 40)	8
Belgium (Ultratop 50 Flanders)	11
Belgium (Ultratop 50 Wallonia)	17
Brazil Hot 100 Airplay (Billboard Brasil)	4
Bulgaria Airplay (BAMP)	1
Canada Hot 100 (Billboard)	80
Colombia Anglo Airplay (Monitor Latino)	10
CIS Airplay (TopHit)	7
Czech Republic Airplay (ČNS IFPI)	20
Czech Republic Singles Digital (ČNS IFPI)	16
Denmark (Tracklisten)	6
Euro Digital Song Sales (Billboard)	2
Finland (Suomen virallinen lista)	14
Finland Airplay (Radiosoittolista)	2
France (SNEP)	40
Germany (GfK)	9
Hungary (Rádiós Top 40)	19
Hungary (Single Top 40)	25
Hungary (Stream Top 40)	20
Ireland (IRMA)	3
Italy (FIMI)	21
Japan Hot 100 (Billboard)	88
Luxembourg Digital Song Sales (Billboard)	6
Mexico Anglo Airplay (Monitor Latino)	13
Netherlands (Dutch Top 40)	3
Netherlands (Single Top 100)	5
New Zealand (Recorded Music NZ)	18
Norway (VG-lista)	15
Poland Airplay (ZPAV)	2
Portugal (AFP)	98
Russia Airplay (TopHit)	8
Scottish Singles Sales (Official Charts)	1
Slovakia Airplay (ČNS IFPI)	1
Slovakia Singles Digital (ČNS IFPI)	14
Slovenia Airplay (SloTop50)	6
Spain (Promusicae)	27
Sweden (Sverigetopplistan)	26
Switzerland (Schweizer Hitparade)	9
Ukraine Airplay (TopHit)	21
UK Singles (Official Charts)	1
US Hot Dance/Electronic Songs (Billboard)	14
US Pop Airplay (Billboard)	37

2023–2026 weekly chart performance
Chart (2023–2026)	Peak position
Belarus Airplay (TopHit)	100
Lithuania Airplay (TopHit)	161

=== Year-end charts ===
Chart (2015)	Position
Australia (ARIA)	71
Austria (Ö3 Austria Top 40)	75
Belgium (Ultratop Flanders)	39
Belgium (Ultratop Wallonia)	79
CIS (Tophit)	69
Denmark (Tracklisten)	27
France (SNEP)	125
Germany (Official German Charts)	38
Ireland (IRMA)	16
Israel (Media Forest)	38
Italy (FIMI)	55
Netherlands (Dutch Top 40)	6
Netherlands (Single Top 100)	17
Poland (ZPAV)	14
Russia Airplay (Tophit)	73
Slovenia (SloTop50)	32
Spain (PROMUSICAE)	70
Sweden (Sverigetopplistan)	78
Switzerland (Schweizer Hitparade)	45
Ukraine Airplay (Tophit)	65
UK Singles (Official Charts Company)	11
US Hot Dance/Electronic Songs (Billboard)	31
US Dance/Electronic Digital Songs (Billboard)	40

=== Decade-end charts ===
Chart (2010–2019)	Position
UK Singles (Official Charts Company)	96

== Certifications ==
Region	Certification	Certified units/sales
Australia (ARIA)	Platinum	70,000^{^}
Belgium (BRMA)	Platinum	20,000^{‡}
Brazil (Pro-Música Brasil)	2× Platinum	120,000^{‡}
Denmark (IFPI Danmark)	2× Platinum	180,000^{‡}
Germany (BVMI)	Platinum	400,000^{‡}
Italy (FIMI)	2× Platinum	100,000^{‡}
New Zealand (RMNZ)	2× Platinum	60,000^{‡}
Poland (ZPAV)	3× Platinum	60,000^{‡}
Spain (Promusicae)	Platinum	40,000^{‡}
Sweden (GLF)	2× Platinum	80,000^{‡}
United Kingdom (BPI)	4× Platinum	2,400,000^{‡}
United States (RIAA)	Gold	500,000^{‡}
^{^} Shipments figures based on certification alone.^{‡} Sales+streaming figures based on certification alone.

== Release history ==
Region	Date	Format	Label
Ireland	27 February 2015	Digital download	Polydor
United Kingdom	1 March 2015	Digital download	Polydor
Australia	1 March 2015	Digital download	Polydor
United States	21 April 2015	Mainstream radio	Cherrytree; Interscope
United States	5 May 2015	Dance radio	Cherrytree; Interscope
