= Hallucination (Regard and Years & Years song) =

2022 single by Regard and Years & Years

Single by Regard and Years & Years

from the album Night Call
- Language: English
- Released: 18 February 2022
- Genre: Disco-pop; synth-pop
- Length: 2:54
- Label: Ministry of Sound
- Songwriters: Regard; Olly Alexander; Jean-Jacques Goldman; Joel Little; Nadia Mladjao; Stéfane Goldman
- Producer: Regard

Regard singles chronology
"Signals" (2021)	"Hallucination" (2022)	"No Love For You" (2022)

Olly Alexander singles chronology
"Sweet Talker" (2021)	"Hallucination" (2022)	"100% Pure Love" (2022)

Music video
- "Hallucination" on YouTube

"Hallucination" is a song by Kosovo-Albanian disc jockey Regard and British singer Years & Years. Regard produced the song and wrote it along with Olly Alexander and Jean-Jacques Goldman, Joel Little, Imany and Stéfane Goldman. Ministry of Sound released it as a single for digital download and streaming on 18 February 2022. Featuring a sample of the Filatov & Karas remix of Imany's single "Don't Be So Shy", it is an '80s-inspired and four-on-the-floor-driven disco-pop and synth-pop song, with the lyrics warning off serial heartbreakers. It was later included on the streaming edition of Years & Years' third album Night Call (Deluxe) (2022).

"Hallucination" received generally positive reviews from music critics, many of whom commended the song's lyrics and nature as well as Years & Years' vocal delivery. It topped the charts in Bulgaria and Russia, and reached the top 10 in the Commonwealth of Independent States (CIS), Croatia and Ukraine. The duo performed the song for the first time on the British comedy show The Graham Norton Show in February 2022. The accompanying music video premiered on Regard's official YouTube channel on 11 March. Inspired by the 1969 psychological drama film They Shoot Horses, Don't They?, the video depicts the singer performing contemporary choreography in a dark setting.

== Background and composition ==
"Hallucination" was released as a single for digital download and streaming by Ministry of Sound in various territories on 18 February 2022. Regard produced the song and co-wrote it with Olly Alexander, Jean-Jacques Goldman, Joel Little, Imany and Stéfane Goldman. Musically, it is an English-language '80s-inspired and four-on-the-floor-driven disco-pop and synth-pop song, featuring a sample of the Filatov & Karas remix of Imany's single "Don't Be So Shy" (2015). The lyrics find Years & Years' member Olly Alexander warning off serial heartbreakers and all of the facets. Concerning its meaning, Alexander stated:

"I was inspired to write ['Hallucination'] when an ex lover attempted to re-enter my life. Part of me wanted to rekindle the romance but too much had changed and I was left feeling really confused. If I looked at the situation a certain way, the whole thing seemed fake, like it was all just one big illusion. You know after the dust settles and you’re like, was any of that real?"

== Reception ==
"Hallucination" was met with generally positive reviews from music critics. While Cerys Kenneally of The Line of Best Fit labelled it as an "anthem", Isabel von Glahn from Westdeutscher Rundfunk (WDR) highlighted the song's lyrics as "exciting" and noted its "club banger" potential. In writing for Radio Sound, the editor equally commended the song, writing that it "is a perfect track for the dance floor". For Wyspa.fm, Przemysław Kokot complimented the song's blend of synth-pop as well as Alexander's "sensual" vocal delivery, and characterised it as an "flawlessly shimmering banger". Radio FG's Antony Harari further commended the collaboration between Regard and Years & Years. Commercially, "Hallucination" topped the rankings in Bulgaria and Russia, and entered the top 10 in the Commonwealth of Independent States (CIS), Croatia and Ukraine. The song further reached number 17 in Hungary, number 45 in Slovakia, number 56 in the United Kingdom and number 39 on New Zealand's Hot Singles chart as well as number 28 on the US Billboard Dance/Electronic Songs chart. It received airplay among radio stations in Estonia, Latvia, North Macedonia, Serbia and the United Arab Emirates.

== Promotion ==
An accompanying music video for "Hallucination" was uploaded to Regard's official YouTube channel on 11 March 2022. Directed by Sophia Ray, the video's concept was inspired by the American psychological drama film They Shoot Horses, Don't They? (1969). It depicts Alexander as an "apprehensive contestant" at the centre of a dark surrounding performing a contemporary-described choreography accompanied by several background dancers. Interspersed scenes through the main plot portray Regard as a "mysteriously sinister-driving force" behind the scenes and the dancers through television screens. A critic likened the concept of the video to that of British anthology series Black Mirror and South Korean survival drama Squid Game. Promo News' Rob Ulitski opined that "the video is a tour de force of creativity, wrapped in vibrant layers of choreography, post-apocalyptic styling and futuristic art direction, and emanates a minacious yet playful tone throughout". Wyspa.fm's Kokot highlighted the video's concept and further stated that "[it] is the perfect contradiction to an 80s-inspired synth-pop song that combines futurism with reinvented nostalgia". To further promote the song, Regard and Years & Years performed "Hallucination" at the Printworks in London, UK, as well as on the British comedy show The Graham Norton Show in February 2022.

== Track listing ==
- Digital download and streaming
1. "Hallucination" – 2:54
- Digital download and streaming – Extended
1. "Hallucination" (Extended) – 3:47
- Digital download and streaming – Remixes
1. "Hallucination" (Drop G Remix) – 3:13
2. "Hallucination" (Luude Remix) – 2:47
3. "Hallucination" (Navos Remix) – 2:30

== Charts ==
=== Weekly charts ===
Weekly chart performance for "Hallucination"
Chart (2022)	Peak position
Bulgaria (PROPHON)	1
Canada CHR/Top 40 (Billboard)	46
CIS (TopHit)	3
Croatia (HRT)	4
Estonia (Radiomonitor)	19
Hungary (Rádiós Top 40)	37
Hungary (Single Top 40)	17
Latvia (Radiomonitor)	15
New Zealand Hot Singles (RMNZ)	39
North Macedonia (Radiomonitor)	3
Russia Airplay (TopHit)	1
Serbia (Radiomonitor)	11
Slovakia (Rádio Top 100)	45
UAE (Radiomonitor)	6
UK Singles (OCC)	56
Ukraine Airplay (TopHit)	7
US Hot Dance/Electronic Songs (Billboard)	28

=== Monthly charts ===
Monthly chart performance for "Hallucination"
Chart (2022)	Peak position
CIS (TopHit)	3
Russia Airplay (TopHit)	1
Ukraine Airplay (TopHit)	9

=== Year-end charts ===
2022 year-end chart performance for "Hallucination"
Chart (2022)	Position
CIS (TopHit)	13
Croatia (HRT)	51
Russia Airplay (TopHit)	4
Ukraine Airplay (TopHit)	50
US Dance/Mix Show Airplay (Billboard)	31

2023 year-end chart performance for "Hallucination"
Chart (2023)	Position
CIS (TopHit)	132
Ukraine Airplay (TopHit)	159

2024 year-end chart performance for "Hallucination"
Chart (2024)	Position
Lithuania Airplay (TopHit)	72

2025 year-end chart performance for "Hallucination"
Chart (2025)	Position
Lithuania Airplay (TopHit)	148

== Certifications ==
Certifications for "Hallucination"
Region	Certification	Certified units/sales
Poland (ZPAV)	Gold	25,000^{‡}
United Kingdom (BPI)	Silver	200,000^{‡}
^{‡} Sales+streaming figures based on certification alone.

== Release history ==
Release dates and formats for "Hallucination"
Region	Date	Format(s)	Label	Ref.
Various	18 February 2022	Digital download; streaming	Ministry of Sound	
Italy	18 February 2022	Radio airplay	Sony	
