= Desire (Years & Years song) =

2014 song by Years & Years

Single by Years & Years

from the album Communion
- Released: 23 November 2014
- Recorded: 2014
- Genre: Dance-pop
- Length: 3:25
- Label: Polydor
- Songwriters: Olly Alexander; Michael Goldsworthy; Emre Turkmen; Kid Harpoon
- Producers: Years & Years; Two Inch Punch

Years & Years singles chronology
"Sunlight" (2014)	"Desire" (2014)	"King" (2015)

Music video
- "Desire" on YouTube

"Desire" is a song by English synthpop band Years & Years from their debut studio album, Communion (2015). It was released on 23 November 2014 as the album's third single. Written by Years & Years and Kid Harpoon, the song peaked at number 22 on the UK Singles Chart.

== Music video ==
A music video to accompany the release of "Desire" was first released onto YouTube on 4 November 2014 at a total length of three minutes and twenty-six seconds. The video features night scenes of the city of Tokyo with Olly seen writing the same word on a typewriter in a darkened room, scenes of Japanese people eating dinner, taking Paparazzi pictures, having sex, and the members recording the song in a blue foggy studio. At the end, Olly is seen in the darkened room with the typewriter with the entire room on fire.

Stage and screen star Cara Horgan is also featured in the music video.

== Track listing ==
- Digital download
1. "Desire" – 3:27
- Digital download – Remixes
1. "Desire" (Tourist Dub Mix) – 5:06
2. "Desire" (Rainer + Grimm Remix) – 4:45
3. "Desire" (Zac Samuel Remix) – 3:01
4. "Memo" – 3:22
- 7" vinyl
1. "Desire" – 3:25
2. "Memo" – 3:22
- Digital download – Re-release
1. "Desire" (featuring Tove Lo) – 3:23
- Digital download – Remixes
1. "Desire" (Fono Remix) – 5:15
2. "Desire" (Feki Remix) – 3:39
3. "Desire" (Gryffin Remix) - 4:28

== Charts ==
=== Weekly charts ===
Chart (2014–2016)	Peak position
Belgium (Ultratip Bubbling Under Flanders)	7
Bulgaria Airplay (BAMP)	5
Czech Republic Airplay (ČNS IFPI)	42
Ireland (IRMA)	61
Netherlands (Dutch Top 40)	22
Netherlands (Single Top 100)	32
Poland Dance (ZPAV)	48
Poland (Polish Airplay New)	2
Slovenia (SloTop50)	41
Scottish Singles Sales (Official Charts)	20
UK Singles (Official Charts)	22
UK Dance (Official Charts)	5
US Hot Dance/Electronic Songs (Billboard)	21

=== Year-end charts ===
Chart (2015)	Position
Netherlands (NPO 3FM)	57
Netherlands (Dutch Top 40)	87

Chart (2016)	Position
Netherlands (Dutch Top 40)	202

== Certifications ==
Region	Certification	Certified units/sales
Canada (Music Canada) Ian Asher Remix	Platinum	80,000^{‡}
Brazil (Pro-Música Brasil)	Platinum	60,000^{‡}
Denmark (IFPI Danmark)	Platinum	90,000^{‡}
New Zealand (RMNZ) Ian Asher Remix	Platinum	30,000^{‡}
United Kingdom (BPI)	2× Platinum	1,200,000^{‡}
^{‡} Sales+streaming figures based on certification alone.

== Release history ==
Region	Date	Format	Label
United Kingdom	23 November 2014	Digital download	Polydor
United Kingdom	24 November 2014	7-inch single	Polydor
United States	29 September 2015	Contemporary hit radio	Interscope

== Remix featuring Tove Lo ==
"Desire"

Single by Years & Years featuring Tove Lo

from the album Communion (deluxe edition)
- Released: 4 March 2016
- Recorded: 2014–2015
- Genre: Dance-pop
- Length: 3:23
- Label: Polydor
- Songwriters: Olly Alexander; Michael Goldsworthy; Emre Turkmen; Kid Harpoon; Tove Lo
- Producers: Years & Years; Two Inch Punch

Years & Years singles chronology
"Eyes Shut" (2015)	"Desire" (2016)	"Worship" (2016)

Tove Lo singles chronology
"Scars" (2016)	"Desire" (2016)	"Close" (2016)

Music video
- "Desire (featuring Tove Lo)" on YouTube

On 24 February 2016, the band announced a re-release of "Desire" via social media. They uploaded a short video containing clips from the new video and featuring a new backing track containing female vocals. The clip ended with the words "Desire March 4th" appearing on screen. On 2 March, the band announced Swedish singer Tove Lo would be featured on the new version. On 3 March, the band debuted the track on Capital FM Breakfast.

=== Music videos ===
At midnight on 4 March, the band released the new video via their Vevo channel on YouTube.

=== Charts ===
Chart (2016)	Peak position
Belgium (Ultratop 50 Flanders)	22
Sweden (Sverigetopplistan)	78
UK Singles (Official Charts)	27

=== Certifications ===
Certifications for "Desire" (featuring Tove Lo)
Region	Certification	Certified units/sales
New Zealand (RMNZ)	Platinum	30,000^{‡}
^{‡} Sales+streaming figures based on certification alone.

=== Release history ===
Region	Date	Format	Label	Ref.
United Kingdom	4 March 2016	Digital download	Polydor	
United Kingdom	18 March 2016	Contemporary hit radio	Polydor	
