= The Magician (musician) =

Belgian disc jockey (born 1987)

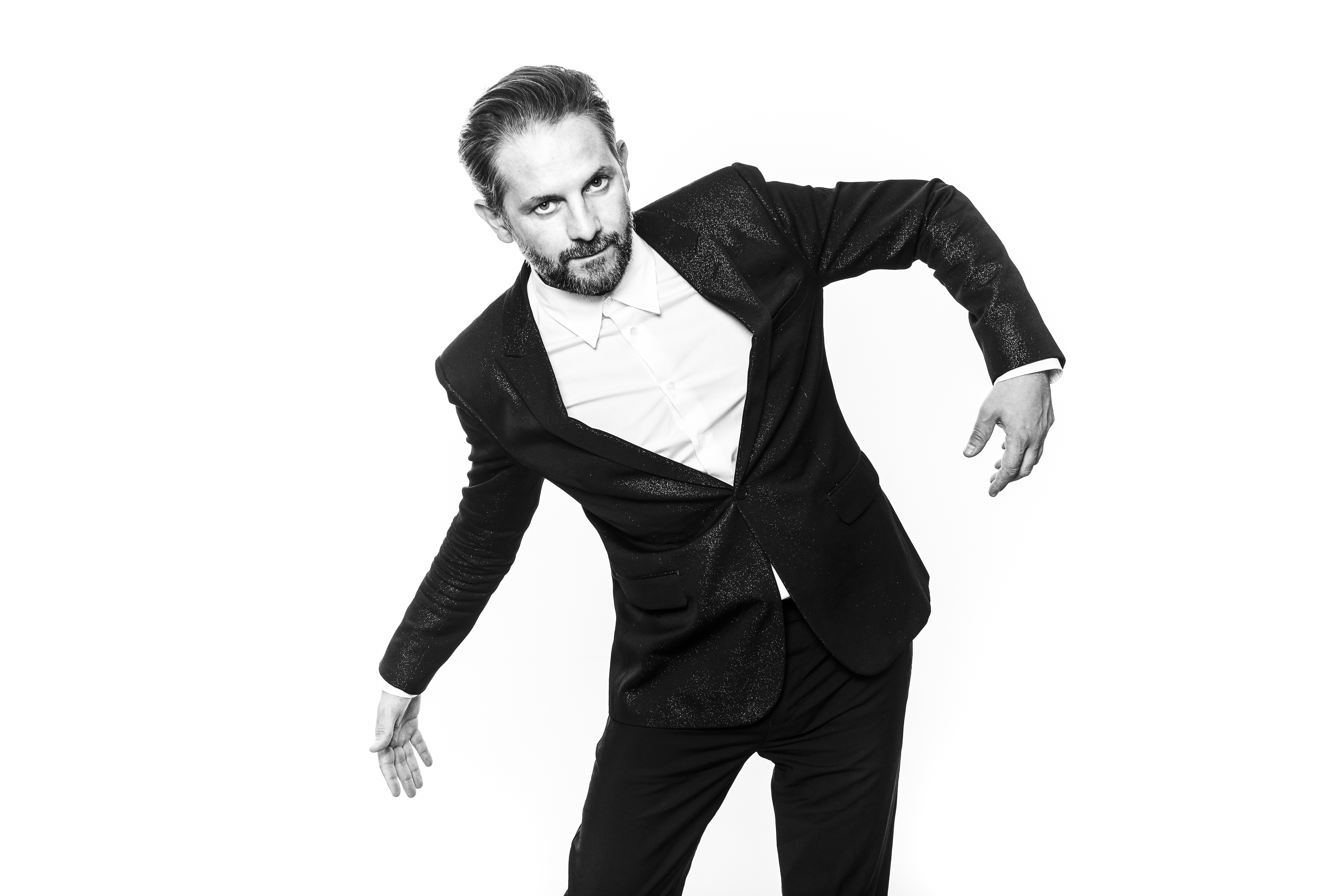
- Stephen "The Magician" Fasano (publicity photo, 2019)

Background information
- Also known as: The Magician
- Born: Stephen Fasano; 1987 (age 38–39); Namur, Belgium
- Genres: House; nu-disco; future house
- Occupations: DJ; record producer
- Years active: 2005–present
- Label: POTION
- Website: www.the-magician.com

Stephen Fasano, better known by his stage name The Magician, is a Belgian DJ and record producer from Namur, in Belgium. He is best known for his 2011 remix of Lykke Li's "I Follow Rivers", his single "Sunlight" featuring Years & Years and his 2014 remix of Clean Bandit's "Rather Be" which were worldwide hits. In 2014, he received the Electro award during the Belgian ceremony Les Octaves de la musique. His monthly mixtapes called Magic Tapes, which he started releasing in the mid-2010s, feature new dance music from an array of genres.

== Career ==
=== 2007–2010: Aeroplane ===
He was a member of music duo Aeroplane with Vito de Luca since 2007. In 2010, Fasano announced that he was leaving the duo to start his own solo project. De Luca continues to use the name Aeroplane.

=== 2011–2013: Twist ===
In 2011, he released his debut EP Twist on the hip French label Kitsuné in collaboration with Yuksek as Peter and The Magician. In October 2011, he released his debut single "I Don't Know What to Do" featuring Jeppe Laursen on Kitsuné. In 2012, he released the single "Memory" again with Yuksek as Peter and The Magician on Kitsuné. In September 2013, he released the single "When the Night Is Over", and also later released the single "On My Brain" on Party Fine Music.

=== 2014–2019: Breakthrough ===
In July 2014, he released the single "Sunlight" featuring vocals from Years & Years; the song peaked at number 7 in Belgium. The song was released in the United Kingdom on 28 September 2014. The Magician performed "Sunlight" along with Years & Years at the 2014 MTV Europe Music Awards in Glasgow, Scotland as part of the Digital Show which was held at the O2 Academy Glasgow. In July 2014, he launched his own label Potion Records to release his own music as well as the music of others. Artists like Fabich, the Aston Shuffle, Bobby Nourmand, Just Kiddin, Endor and Aevion have released music with Potion Records. The label took a break in 2019. In parallel, The Magician tours mainly in the United States and in Europe. He also performed at Tomorrowland in 2018.

=== 2020–present: Renaissance ===
The Magician maintains a solid rhythm in releasing remixes. He also released the Renaissance EP in May 2020. He took advantage of the COVID-19 quarantine to launch his live vinyl home show Supervision. Later that year, he relaunched his label Potion Records in collaboration with French music company Unity Group and released music from Soda State and Aevion.

The album Magic Tape 100 was to be released in 2021.

== Discography ==
=== Extended plays ===
Title	Details
Twist (featuring Peter)	Released: 21 June 2011; Label: Kitsuné
I Don't Know What to Do (Remixes) (featuring Jeppe)	Released: 3 October 2011; Label: Kitsuné
Memory (Remixes)	Released: 12 July 2012; Label: Kitsuné
When the Night Is Over (The Remixes)	Released: 1 November 2013; Label: Parlophone
When the Night Is Over EP	Released: 29 November 2013; Label: Parlophone
Sunlight (+ The Remixes)	Released: 15 September 2014; Label: Potion / Parlophone
Together	Released: 22 June 2015; Label: Potion
Tied Up (The Remixes)	Released: 23 March 2017; Label: Sony
Slow Motion (The Remixes)	Released: 10 November 2017; Label: Sony
Las Vegas (The Remixes)	Released: 16 March 2018; Label: Sony
Ready to Love (The Remixes)	Released: 7 June 2019; Label: Sony
Renaissance	Released: 15 May 2020; Label: Asylum

=== Singles ===
Title	Year	Peak chart positions						Certifications	Album
Title	Year	BEL (Fl)	BEL (Wa)	AUS	FRA	UK	UK Dance	Certifications	Album
"I Don't Know What to Do" (featuring Jeppe)	2011	—^{[A]}	—^{[B]}	—	—	—	—		Non-album singles
"When the Night Is Over" (featuring Newtimers)	2013	—^{[C]}	44	—	—	—	—		Non-album singles
"Sunlight" (featuring Years & Years)	2014	7	11	20	184	7	3	ARIA: Gold; BEA: Gold; BPI: Gold	Non-album singles
"Together"	2015	20	—^{[D]}	—	—	—	—		Non-album singles
"Shy" (featuring Brayton Bowman)	2016	32	—	—	—	—	—		Non-album singles
"Tied Up" (with Julian Perretta)	2017	33	—^{[E]}	—	52	—	—		Non-album singles
"Slow Motion" (with TCTS featuring Sam Sure)	2017	—	—	—	—	—	—		Non-album singles
"Las Vegas" (with Ebenezer)	2018	—^{[F]}	—^{[G]}	—	—	—	—		Non-album singles
"Love Break" (featuring Hamza)	2018	—	—	—	—	—	—	SNEP: Gold	Non-album singles
"Build a Fire" (featuring Clew & Prov)	2018	—^{[H]}	—^{[I]}	—	—	—	—		Non-album singles
"Jalisco" (with Kideko)	2018	—	—	—	—	—	—		Non-album singles
"Ready to Love"	2019	—	—	—	—	—	—		Non-album singles
"Club Fever Pt. 1: Disco Dakka"	2019	—	—	—	—	—	—		Non-album singles
"You and Me"	2020	—	—	—	—	—	—		Non-album singles
"—" denotes a recording that did not chart or was not released in that territory.

=== Singles as Peter and The Magician ===
Year	Title	Album
2012	"Memory" (featuring Peter)	—N/a
2013	"On My Brain" (featuring Peter)	—N/a
