= Shine (Years & Years song) =

2015 single by Years & Years

Single by Years & Years

from the album Communion
- Released: 3 July 2015
- Recorded: 2014–2015
- Length: 3:28 (radio edit); 4:14 (album version); 3:11 (NOW 91/interactive video version)
- Label: Polydor; Interscope
- Songwriters: Oliver Alexander Thornton; Resul Emre Turkmen; Michael Thomas "Mikey" Goldsworthy; Mark Ralph; Greg Kurstin
- Producers: Years & Years; Ralph

Years & Years singles chronology
"King" (2015)	"Shine" (2015)	"Eyes Shut" (2015)

"Shine" is a song by British synthpop trio Years & Years for their debut studio album, Communion (2015). It was released on 5 July 2015 by Polydor Records as the album's fifth single and is the third track on the album. "Shine" peaked at number two on the UK Singles Chart. It also serves as a follow-up to the group's most successful single, "King".

== Background ==
The song premiered on 11 May 2015 as Annie Mac's Hottest Record in the World, and is their follow-up to "King" from the album Communion. Vocalist Olly Alexander explained that the song uses light as a metaphor to pertain to the "overwhelming and unstable feeling of falling in love". The track was written for his new boyfriend and marked a change in style. "I know he would’ve said he liked it, but it really mattered to me whether he truly liked it or not. But he did, and I was so relieved".

== Music video ==
A music video was created for the song. It features the band traversing a house in which assorted supernatural occurrences occur. The band took inspiration from the films E.T. the Extra-Terrestrial, Poltergeist, and Close Encounters of the Third Kind. An interactive music video was later released for the record, billed by Spin magazine as "a choose your own adventure", in which the viewer may pick from either "Choose Light", "Choose Dark" or "Choose Shadow". The live interactive event using the three video sequences was premièred on the UK's Channel 4, Friday 10 July 2015 in a three and a half minute advert break controlled by viewers tweets as a promotion for the single Shine and the Communion album using the hashtags for the three colour styles, refreshed every 30 seconds on viewers votes. The creative agency The Outfit produced the advert for Polydor Records. Channel 4 and Years & Years embraced the take over. "Viewers’ tweets will be counted live during the ad break and tallied every 30 seconds, while the two alternative music video choices to the performance playing in full screen will be displayed as insets". Jack Melhuish, the marketing director at Polydor Records said "Giving fans and viewers the chance to control and direct a TV advert as it happens has never been done before and plays perfectly into the band’s ethos of rewarding their fans and always being on the cutting edge". Promonews reported that nearly 14,000 tweets were made during the event and more people were pulled into watch the event rather than the programme which contained the ad break. The performance was also simulcast to a global audience via the band's website, Twitter and Facebook feeds and subsequently was made available as an interactive video.

== Critical reception ==
"Shine" received very positive reviews from music critics. PopJustice.com gave it a positive review, noting similarities between it and Girls Aloud's "Call the Shots" and the fact that "the similarity would have inspired eight bootlegs, two compilation albums and a club night by now" in 2002, they scored it 9/10 and stated that it would have scored 10/10 had "it picked up the tempo a bit". Sugarscape was also positive, commending it for not departing from the sound of the band's previous singles of "glittery, 80s-tinged synthpop" and instead opting for a "melancholic and even more emotionally-charged" sound whilst still retaining a "huge chorus and quirky elements in the production that separate them from the rest of the pop pack".

== In popular culture ==
"Shine" was performed by Years & Years on Sunday Brunch and on the 20th Anniversary edition of TFI Friday. Irish Broadcaster RTÉ One also used the track, in their coverage of the results of the 2016 Irish general election.

The song is also featured in the 2016 racing video game Forza Horizon 3, which plays in the in-game radio station Horizon Pulse. The song also was used in the 2018 ITV Drama Butterfly

UK country pop duo Ward Thomas covered the song on their 2017 EP A Shorter Story.

== Track listing ==
Digital download – single
No.	Title	Length
1.	"Shine"	4:14

Digital download – remixes
No.	Title	Length
1.	"Shine" (Sanna & Pitron Remix)	7:05
2.	"Shine" (Joe Goddard Remix)	5:21
3.	"Shine" (Toyboy & Robin Remix)	5:02
4.	"Shine" (Danny L Harle Remix)	3:30

== Charts ==
=== Weekly charts ===
Chart (2015)	Peak position
Australia (ARIA)	15
Austria (Ö3 Austria Top 40)	35
Belgium (Ultratop 50 Flanders)	18
Belgium (Ultratip Bubbling Under Wallonia)	4
Euro Digital Song Sales (Billboard)	2
France (SNEP)	163
Germany (GfK)	29
Ireland (IRMA)	9
Netherlands (Single Top 100)	77
Poland Airplay (ZPAV)	20
Scottish Singles Sales (Official Charts)	1
Slovakia Airplay (ČNS IFPI)	41
Slovenia (SloTop50)	16
Spain (Promusicae)	35
Sweden (Sverigetopplistan)	81
Switzerland (Schweizer Hitparade)	41
UK Singles (Official Charts)	2
US Hot Dance/Electronic Songs (Billboard)	45

=== Year-end charts ===
Chart (2015)	Position
Belgium (Ultratop Flanders)	85
UK Singles (OCC)	37

== Certifications ==
Region	Certification	Certified units/sales
Australia (ARIA)	Gold	35,000^{‡}
Brazil (Pro-Música Brasil)	Gold	30,000^{‡}
Denmark (IFPI Danmark)	Gold	30,000^{^}
Germany (BVMI)	Gold	200,000^{‡}
Poland (ZPAV)	Platinum	20,000^{‡}
United Kingdom (BPI)	2× Platinum	1,200,000^{‡}
^{^} Shipments figures based on certification alone.^{‡} Sales+streaming figures based on certification alone.
