= Not on Drugs =

Single by Tove Lo

from the EP Truth Serum
- Released: 24 February 2014
- Recorded: 2013
- Genre: Pop; EDM; electropop
- Length: 3:03
- Label: Island; Republic
- Songwriters: Tove Lo; Alx Reuterskiöld; Jakob Jerlström; Ludvig Söderberg
- Producers: The Struts; Alx Reuterskiöld

Tove Lo singles chronology
"Habits (Stay High)" (2013)	"Not on Drugs" (2014)	"Stay High" (2014)

Music video
- "Not on Drugs" on YouTube

"Not on Drugs" is a song by Swedish singer-songwriter Tove Lo for her debut extended play Truth Serum and her debut studio album Queen of the Clouds, both of which were released in 2014. It was co-written by Lo together with its producers, Alx Reuterskiöld and the Struts. The recording premiered on 24 February 2014 on Swedish radio station P3 as a promotional single from Truth Serum. It was also released as part of Queen of the Clouds; however, it is not considered part of the promotion for the record, since its other scheduled releases were cancelled in order to promote "Talking Body", the album's second single.

"Not on Drugs" is a mid-tempo pop, EDM, and electropop song; in the lyrics, Lo compares falling in love to being under the influence of drugs. The artist stated that the recording represented the "positive beginning" of her relationships. The track received positive reviews from critics; many of them commended its production and lyrics, especially the chorus, while others considered it one of the best tracks from Truth Serum. It spent two weeks on the Billboard Twitter Emerging Artists chart, where it reached number 19.

A music video for "Not on Drugs", directed by Rikkard Häggbom, was released on 19 August 2014, the same day the availability of Queen of the Clouds was announced. It features the singer performing the song in a white room while computer animation is projected on the background and colored smoke bombs explode around her. Lo performed the track on numerous occasions, including on the by:Larm and South by Southwest festivals, at Notting Hill Arts Club in London and on The Tonight Show Starring Jimmy Fallon. It was later included on the set list of the singer's first tour, the Queen of the Clouds Tour (2015). Marianne Engebretsen, a contestant on the third season of the Norwegian version of reality singing competition The Voice, covered "Not on Drugs" on 22 May 2015.

== Background and release ==
"Not on Drugs" was written by Lo alongside Alx Reuterskiöld, Jakob Jerlström and Ludvig Söderberg, with the latter two being credited as the Struts. It was included on the artist's debut extended play, Truth Serum and debut studio album, Queen of the Clouds, both of which were released in 2014. Reuterskiöld also co-wrote "Out of Mind" from Truth Serum and "Got Love" from Queen of the Clouds. Regarding her work with him, the singer confessed, "He's a Swedish guy and is the most artistic person I've ever met. He's very hard to work with, but he's amazing, so it's worth it. Even though he takes a while to get his tone down". The track was recorded at Warner/Chappell Studios in Stockholm, with the Struts producing and programming it alongside playing the keys and guitars. Lars Norgren mixed the song, while Björn Engelmann mastered it at Cutting Room, Stockholm. Reuterskiöld also co-produced it and played the keys.

"Not on Drugs" was initially released as a promotional single from Truth Serum. On 24 February 2014, it was premiered on Swedish radio station P3, and was released on Lo's SoundCloud account. Later, Digital Spy announced that the track would be digitally released on 31 August 2014 as the second single from Queen of the Clouds. After the announcement, many journalists and Lo herself considered it a "funny" and "interesting" follow up to "Habits (Stay High)". However, the following month, Island Records president David Massey told Billboard that the label had not chosen a second single from Queen of the Clouds yet. Republic and Island Records sent "Not on Drugs" to American modern rock radio stations on 25 November 2014 and scheduled a release to American contemporary hit radio (CHR) for 20 January 2015. However, the labels announced in December 2014 that "Talking Body" would impact the aforementioned radio format instead as the second single from the album. Despite this, "Not on Drugs" was not removed from American modern rock radio.

== Inspiration and composition ==
"Not on Drugs" is the opening track on Tove Lo's debut extended play, Truth Serum. According to the artist, the songs on the EP talk about her "most intense" failed relationship from beginning to end, which started "really happy and passionate". Following the narrative of Truth Serum, the track conveys the time when Lo was "really in love with someone and [could not] think straight" and felt "high" all the time. She also stated that she wanted to write a happy and euphoric song that represented the positive beginning of her relationships, since most of her tracks are about the decay of them. In an interview with MTV UK, the artist said, "'Not On Drugs' is, like many of my songs so far, about love. At least it's about the happy kind of love where you feel like there's nothing that can get you higher than the person you're with and have these feelings for". "Not on Drugs" was also included in "The Love" section of Lo's debut studio record, Queen of the Clouds, a concept album that describes the pattern of the singer's relationships.

"Not on Drugs" is a mid-tempo pop, EDM, and electropop song with elements of dubstep music. Its "digitally twitchy" verses are followed by a "massive" and "exploding" chorus, "Baby, listen please / I'm not on drugs, I'm just in love! / Baby, don't you see I'm not on drugs? I'm just in love!". The song also incorporates background vocals in which the singer repeats the word "Hi-i-gh!". In the lyrics, Lo compares falling in love to being under the influence of drugs. Regarding the track's composition, she stated that "all of the verses are drug references. It is comparing a high to being in love, which I think can be kind of the same thing". According to Scandipop, the artist is saying in the lyrics that "no – she's not on drugs, it's all that amazing love she's in which is making her so high". Carrie Battan of Pitchfork wrote that Lo insists "she's back on her feet and reaching for the stars—she's not on drugs, she's just in love" in the verse, "I'm up with the kites in a dream so blue / I live in the sky / You come live here, too". The line, "I'm queen of the clouds, make my wish come true" served as the inspiration for the title of the singer's debut album. Both Tim Jonze of The Guardian and Jamieson Cox of Time noted that the track's message contrasted that of "Habits (Stay High)", in which the artist sings about using drugs in order to forget her former boyfriend.

== Reception ==
"Not on Drugs" received mostly positive reviews from critics. Gaffa Norway critic Tord Litleskare called it a "must-hear track" from Truth Serum, alongside "Habits (Stay High)" and "Out of Mind". Lewis Corner of Digital Spy included the recording on his list of 14 underrated songs released in 2014 and wrote that, "An exploding chorus and booming synths make 'Not On Drugs' one of the more epic cuts Tove has recorded to date". Journalist Bradley Stern stated that it was "a personal favorite" of Truth Serum and called it a "trappy" song that is "about as perfect as Swede-pop gets". Idolator's Mike Wass stated that the song "boasts a killer chorus, clever lyrics and a sultry vocal", while Erica Russell of Ladygunn called it a "zippy, effortlessly infectious—much like its hinted subject matter—electropop banger". Chris DeVille of Stereogum said that "Not on Drugs" was "even more of a monster jam" than "Habits (Stay High)" and that it "confirmed that Tove Lo was a cut above 2014's field of aspiring pop stars".

Chad Hillard of Hillydilly wrote, "Boasting the same hit quality we've come to expect from Tove Lo, 'Not On Drugs' features an absolutely massive chorus that soars through engaging electronics and vigorous emotion found in her magnetic vocals". Richard S. Chang ranked it at number two on his top five of the best Tove Lo songs, while Mark Savage of Discopop considered it the "standout track" of Truth Serum. And Pop's Evan Ross wrote on his review of Queen of the Clouds that, "Out of all the songs on the album this one seems to ring the most true about what it's like to be young and in love". Jamieson Cox of Time deemed it as an "epic song" that "is so good, it is adictive". Conversely, an editor of Juice Online wrote that the recording was not "as catchy as 'Habits (Stay High)'". "Not on Drugs" debuted at number 26 on the Billboard Twitter Emerging Artists chart for the issue dated 5 July 2014 and dropped off the chart the following week. It re-entered the chart and peaked at number 19 on 13 September 2014. As of December 2014, "Not on Drugs" has sold 33,000 digital downloads in the United States.

== Music video ==
Tove Lo in the music video for "Not on Drugs", in which she performs the song while computer animation is projected behind her.

The music video for "Not on Drugs" was directed by Rikkard Häggbom. It was released on Lo's Vevo channel and iTunes Store on 19 August 2014, the same day the singer announced the release of Queen of the Clouds. The clip features the singer dancing and performing the song in a white film set and other locations while colored smoke bombs explode around her. During the video, computer-generated animation is projected on the background and Lo's body is edited to appear distorted. In an interview with Rolling Stone, the artist said, "I choked on the paint, the smoke made me half blind and here is my three-minute trip that shows the intensity and weirdness I feel when falling in love. The main theme we had in mind while making this video was 'What just happened?' It was quite amazing making something with the happy piece of my heart this time!".

The music video received mostly positive reviews. Chad Hillard of Hillydilly wrote that "the host of visuals—while definitely intriguing—prove to be quite ironic considering her claim that she's away from those drug things". Writing for Idolator, Bradley Stern described the clip as "a strangely trippy, kaleidoscopic affair with lots of weird camera tricks" and said that it was a "simple, yet effective treatment". However, Mark Savage of Discopop gave the video a negative review, writing, "[...] It's a crying shame that the video for [...] Not on Drugs, is so undercooked. The weird editing, the weirder haircuts, the cheap effects and cheaper locations are a woeful disservice to the song's gutsy declaration of love". He also called it a "disappointment" and stated that "maybe just close your eyes and enjoy the song". As of July 2017, it has received over 35 million views on YouTube.

== Live performances ==
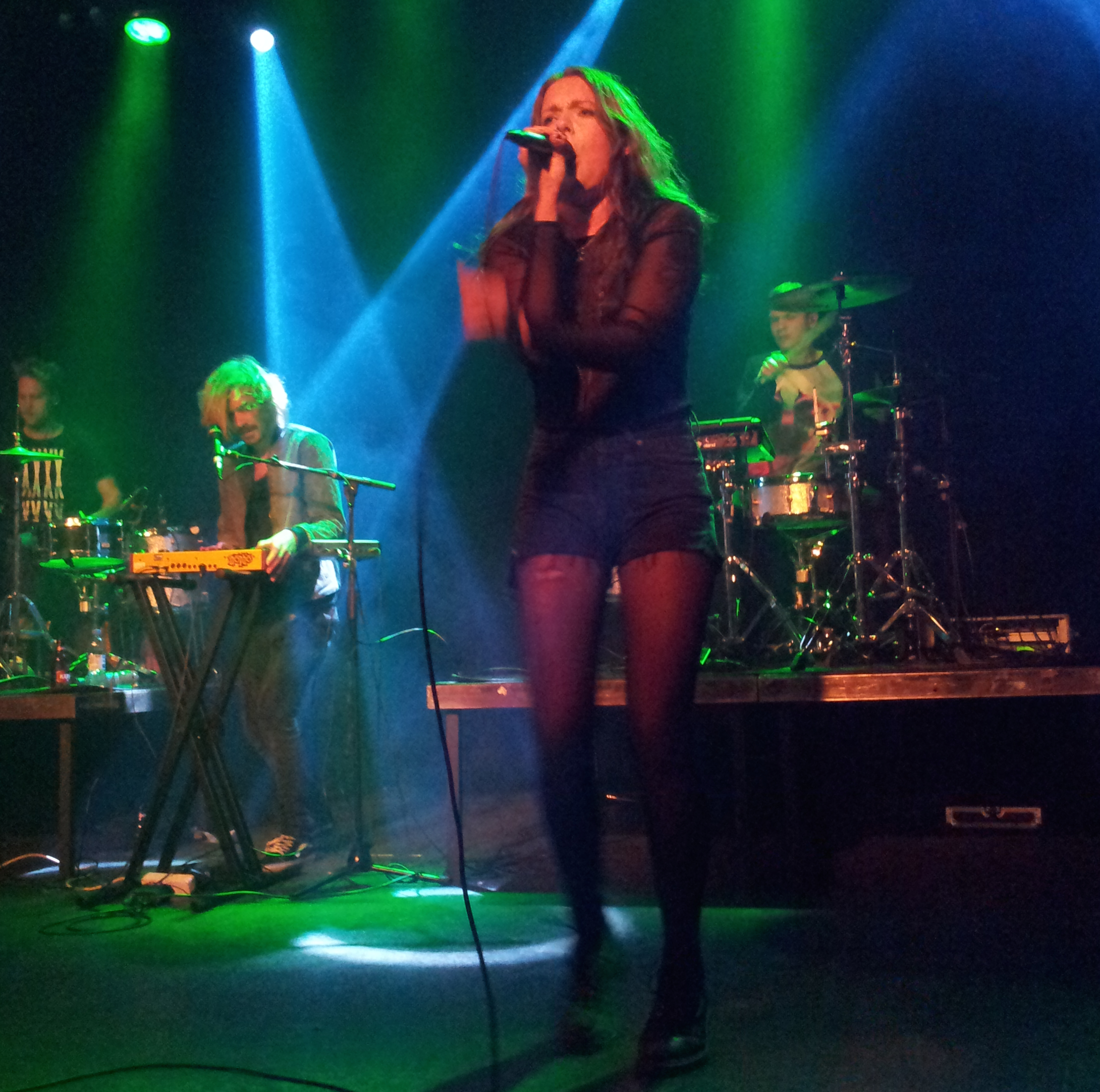
Tove Lo performing at the Tavastia Club in Helsinki in 2014.

Lo performed "Not on Drugs" for the first time on Swedish TV special Eldsjälsgalan on 26 February 2014. On 27 February 2014, the artist performed the song at the Norwegian festival by:Larm. The following month, she sang the track alongside "Habits (Stay High)" and other material from Truth Serum at the South by Southwest festival. On 25 March 2014, the artist performed the song at Tavastia Club in Helsinki, Finland. Lo sang the track alongside other songs from Truth Serum and "Run On Love" during her first UK show at Notting Hill Arts Club, London, on 2 April 2014. For the performance, she was accompanied by two drummers. A reviewer from Discopop said he was "blown away" and that it was "so refreshing to be at a pop show that engages the heart as well as the senses". Michael Cragg of The Guardian rated the show with four stars out of five and deemed it as "a punchy UK debut". Lo performed the same set list at her Hoxton Square Bar & Kitchen show on 6 May 2014. Two months later, she performed the song on American music TV show JBTV.

Lo sang the track alongside "Habits (Stay High)" on KROQ-FM radio station on 16 July 2014. On 1 October, the singer performed "Not on Drugs" and other songs at Webster Hall in Manhattan, New York City. On 6 November 2014, the artist sang the track on The Tonight Show Starring Jimmy Fallon. On 30 March 2015, she held a concert at KOKO in London, and performed the track among others from Truth Serum and Queen of the Clouds. "Not on Drugs" also was included on the set list of Lo's first tour, the Queen of the Clouds Tour (2015).

== Credits and personnel ==
Credits adapted from the liner notes of Truth Serum and Queen of the Clouds.

Locations

- Recorded at Warner/Chappell Studios, Stockholm.
- Mixed at Ramtitam Studios, Stockholm.
- Mastered at Cutting Room, Stockholm.

Personnel

- Lead vocals – Tove Lo
- Songwriting – Tove Lo, Alx Reuterskiöld, Jakob Jerlström, Ludvig Söderberg
- Production – The Struts, Alx Reuterskiöld
- Mixing – Lars Norgren
- Programming – The Struts
- Mastering – Björn Engelmann
- Keys – The Struts, Alx Reuterskiöld
- Guitars – The Struts

== Release history ==
Region	Date	Format	Ref.
Sweden	24 February 2014	Mainstream radio	
United States	25 November 2014	Modern rock radio	
