= Truth Serum (EP) =

EP by Tove Lo
- Released: 3 March 2014
- Recorded: 2012–13
- Studio: Warner/Chappell (Stockholm)
- Genres: Pop; electropop; indie pop
- Length: 20:48
- Labels: Universal; Island; Neon Gold; Polydor
- Producers: The Struts; Alx Reuterskiöld; Mattman & Robin; Mike "Scribz" Riley; Jason Gill

Tove Lo chronology
Truth Serum (2014)	Queen of the Clouds (2014)

Singles from Truth Serum
- 1. "Out of Mind" Released: 16 October 2013; 2. "Habits (Stay High)" Released: 6 December 2013; 3. "Stay High" Released: 25 February 2014

Truth Serum is the debut extended play (EP) by Swedish singer-songwriter Tove Lo. The singer signed a publishing deal with Warner Chappell Music, Inc. in 2011, which led her to write songs for artists like Girls Aloud and Icona Pop. Around that time, she was going through a hard situation in a relationship, so she eventually started composing tracks related to that matter. She then decided to keep those tracks for herself as she considered them too personal. Lo independently released two of the songs as singles, "Love Ballad" in October 2012, and "Habits" in March 2013. Their popularity gained the singer a record deal with Universal Records in 2013. The EP was eventually released through the label, alongside Island Records, Neon Gold Records, and Polydor Records, to digital retailers on the 3rd of March, 2014.

Truth Serum has been described as a pop, electropop and indie pop record. According to Lo, the tracks talk about her most intense love affair, from the happy beginning of the relationship to the part when she is trying to move on after the break up. The project, a pop, electropop, and indie pop record, was recorded from 2012 to 2013 in Warner/Chappell Studios, based in Stockholm, and was produced by The Struts, Alx Reuterskivöld, Mattman & Robin, Mike "Scribz" Riley, and Jason Gill. Upon its release, the EP received mostly positive reviews from music critics, who commended the production and the lyrics of the songs. The record peaked at number 13 in Sweden, and became 2014's 49th best-selling album in the country. It also reached number eight on the Norwegian Albums Chart, spending 23 weeks, and topped the Australian Hitseeker Albums chart.

To promote the record, Lo performed at numerous festivals in 2014, including by:Larm in Norway, South by Southwest in the United States and The Great Escape Festival in the United Kingdom. "Out of Mind" was released as the lead single on 16 October 2013 and peaked at number 39 on the Finnish Airplay Chart. On 6 December 2013, "Habits" was re-issued as "Habits (Stay High)" as the second single. It peaked at number three on the Billboard Hot 100, becoming Lo's first song to enter the chart and her highest-charting single on the chart to date. On 25 February 2014, "Stay High", a remix version of "Habits (Stay High)" by record production duo Hippie Sabotage, was released as the third single from the EP to commercial success in Europe and Oceania, peaking at number 13 in Sweden and reaching the top ten in Australia, New Zealand and the United Kingdom. "Habits (Stay High)" and "Stay High" would later be included on Lo's debut studio album, Queen of the Clouds, with the rest of the songs appearing as bonus tracks to international reissues of the album.

== Background and release ==
In 2006, after finishing high school, Tove Lo formed a math rock band called Tremblebee, with whom she played "shitty bars" across Sweden until 2009. When the band split up, Lo started to produce and write songs by herself, but in a "more pop" direction. While performing at an event in Stockholm in 2011, the artist met an English A&R who got interested in her work. After a meeting in which she played some of her demos, Lo signed a publishing deal with Warner/Chappell Music. This was followed with her joining songwriting teams Xenomania and Wolf Cousins. The deal led her to write songs for Girls Aloud and Icona Pop. During that time, she was going through hard times during a relationship, so she decided to avoid writing songs about that matter. At one point, however, she "could not handle it anymore" and started to write tracks related to her situation.

As of September 2012, Lo had released three songs on her SoundCloud account: "Love Ballad", "Evil Spawn" and "Paradise". The following month, the artist independently released "Love Ballad" as her debut single, which gained attention from music blogs. This encouraged Lo to pursue a career as a singer in order to keep her most personal songs to herself. In March 2013, the artist released "Habits" as her second single. It received a larger attention from publications, which led her to sign a record deal with Universal Music. On 16 October 2013, Lo released her first single through the label, "Out of Mind". In December of that year, she told Coup de Main Magazine that she was working on her first extended play. In February 2014, the artist announced that her first EP would be called Truth Serum and that it would be released on 3 March 2014. Neon Gold issued a limited 10" vinyl release on 4 March for the United States, while Polydor released the EP in the United Kingdom on 7 April. Universal Music released a 12" vinyl in Sweden on 21 April 2014. The Swedish version and the vinyl editions included "Love Ballad" as the opening track. On 23 September 2014, the EP was re-released, featuring a remix version of "Habits (Stay High)" by Swedish DJ Oliver Nelson and three out of the six original tracks.

== Inspiration and composition ==
"[Truth Serum] it's about a relationship from beginning to end and kind of the parts after, trying to get over it in various ways. So it's very much my feelings on the roller coaster during the start of when you're really in love going into when it's starting to feel a bit less good, then you make a mistake, or I made a mistake and you know, kind of how that all falls into pieces, really. But yeah so it's – I think a lot of people can relate, because a lot of people have gone through tough breakups.

— Lo talking about the theme of the EP.

According to the singer, she had written several songs prior to the release of Truth Serum. She confessed that both the writing and recording process of the EP was very emotional, and that the vocals of the songs were taken from her demos. Truth Serum is a concept record that details Lo's "most intense" relationship from beginning to end. That approach was unintentional, as Lo realized that the tracks talked about the relationship after she had picked them for the EP. She explained; "I didn't plan to write it that way, but when I looked at the songs that I had when I was picking ones for the EP, I was like, 'Oh my god, here it is'. I didn't really figure out that it was going to be the full story right there until I looked and listened". Concerning the title of the EP, the singer decided to call it Truth Serum after she had picked the songs for it; she said in an interview that "when you look at the songs, it's all about honesty and I'm really giving up a lot of myself in these songs; I'm not filtering anything. I felt that kind of speaks a lot for how truthful the EP is".

Some critics compared the storyline to the five stages of grief, a theory introduced by Elisabeth Kübler-Ross. Alex Panisch of Out opined that the first five tracks "document the five stages of a relationship turning sour: good times, doubt, breaking up, coping, and still being hung up". Critics also noted that, unlike other artists' break up records, the singer admits in Truth Serum that she was the person who made a mistake that ended the relationship. Panisch commented that; "When female artists sing about breakups [...] they almost overwhelmingly write themselves in the position of the wronged party and their songs are about recovering and strengthening from the experience. [...] Tove Lo flips the script on this narrative". Shanon Carlin of Radio.com stated that the singer "doesn't try and capitalize off her heartbreak by writing a female empowerment anthem that shames the guy who did her wrong. No, on this album, Lo is not an innocent. It's actually quite the opposite".

=== Songs ===
"Habits (Stay High)"
20-second sample of "Habits (Stay High)", a pop and electropop song that talks about the artist's hedonistic attempts to forget her former boyfriend.

In an interview, Lo summarised the storyline of the EP; "The song 'Love Ballad' is about the moment you decide to give everything to another person, while 'Habits' shows what happens when everything is screwed up and you just want to freak out. 'Out of Mind' deals with the stage after that, when your broken heart has mended, but the scars are still there". The EP's main genres are pop, electropop and indie pop. The Swedish edition of Truth Serum opens with "Love Ballad", a pop song with drum instrumentation. It was described as a "parody of love songs" that talks about the "carefree beginnings of a new romance". Lo also called it a "way of telling the one I love I'd do anything for him". In the standard edition, the EP opens with "Not on Drugs", a pop, dance and electropop song in which the artist compares falling in love to being under the influence of drugs. Following the narrative of Truth Serum, it represents the happy beginning of the relationship, when Lo was "really in love" and "[could not] think straight". "Paradise" is a jungle and drum and bass song with electronic elements; it talks about the moment when Lo realizes that she needs and relies on her partner. The electropop song "Over" details the part when Lo and her boyfriend end the relationship. The singer stated that it was about "me making a big mistake and having to confess and come clean". "Habits (Stay High)" is a pop and electropop track which talks about the artist's hedonistic attempts to forget her former boyfriend. "Out of Mind" is a pop song with minimal instrumentation. According to Lo, it represents the part when "I have the pain and I'm trying to get over this heartbreak. It's when you moved on and you're sort of okay, but you still have that little scar". The EP's last track is the downtempo "Stay High", a remix version of "Habits (Stay High)" by record production duo Hippie Sabotage.

== Promotion ==
=== Singles ===
"Out of Mind" was released as the lead single from the EP on 16 October 2013. A music video for the song, directed by Andreas Öhman, was released the same day as the single. It features Lo having an out of body experience where she runs away from her "demons and dark thoughts", which are represented as black ghosts. The song attained little commercial reception, peaking at number 39 on the Finnish Airplay Chart. The previously released "Habits" was re-issued as "Habits (Stay High)" on 6 December 2013, as the second single from Truth Serum. Concerning the track's re-release, the artist stated that the label representatives felt that it "still [had] a lot left to give" and wanted to promote it properly. A second music video for the song was released on 17 March 2014, which features the singer partying with her friends in a Swedish club. The recording was a commercial success in North America and some European countries, peaking at number three on the Billboard Hot 100 and reaching the top ten in Austria, Canada, France and Switzerland, among others countries. "Stay High", a remixed version of "Habits (Stay High)" by Hippie Sabotage, was issued as the EP's third single on 25 February 2014. According to Lo, the decision to release it was made after radio programmers in the United Kingdom started to feature it on their playlists. It similarly experienced success in Europe and Oceania, reaching number 13 in Sweden and peaking within the top ten in Australia, Netherlands, New Zealand and United Kingdom, among other regions. "Not on Drugs" was released as the only promotional single from the extended play. On 24 February 2014, it was sent to Swedish radio station P3, and was released on Lo's SoundCloud account.

=== Live performances ===
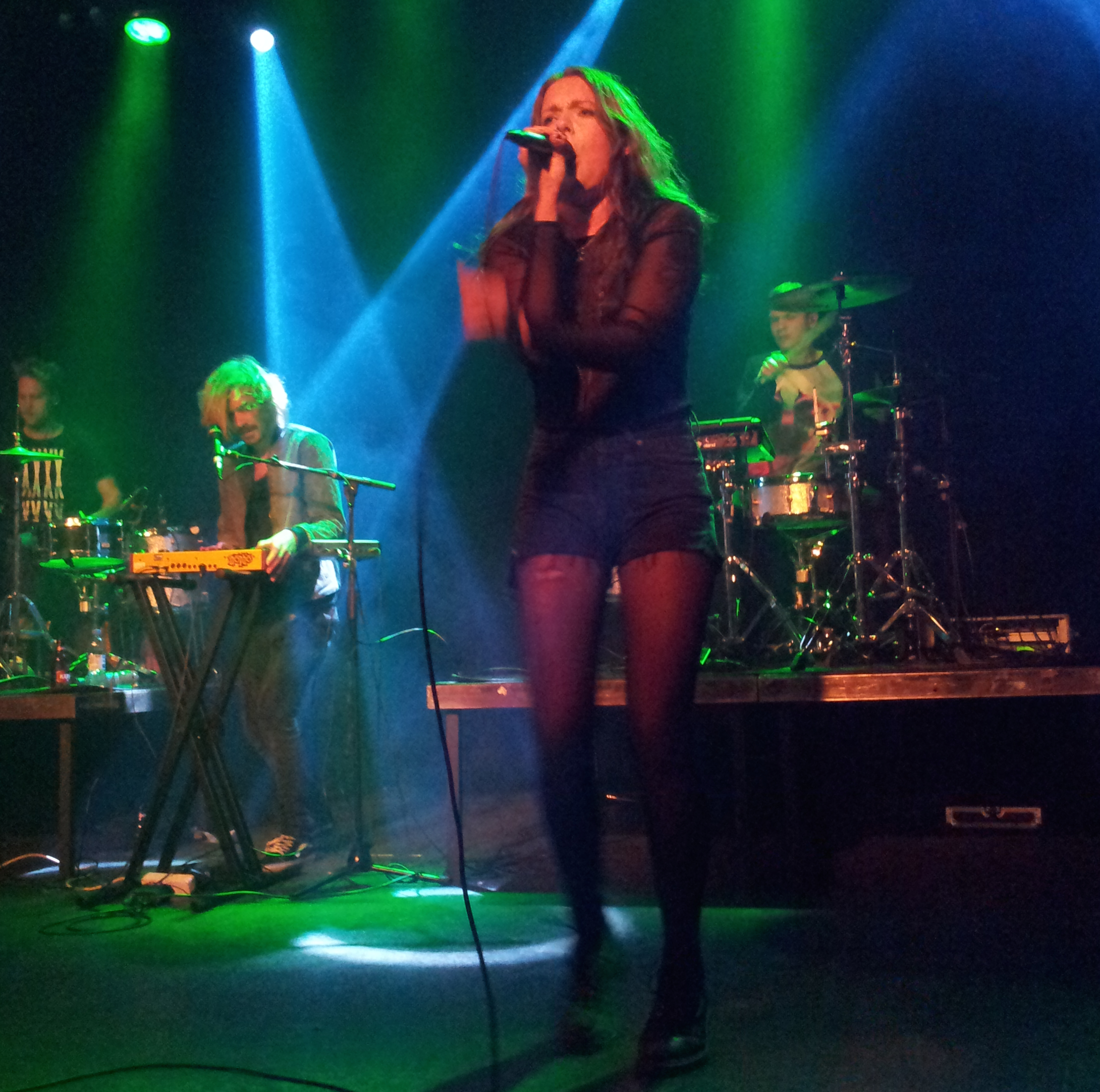
Tove Lo performing at the Tavastia Club in Helsinki in 2014.

Lo held a concert at the Norwegian festival by:Larm on 27 February 2014. The following month, she performed a number of tracks at the American South by Southwest festival. On 22 March 2014, the artist sang "Not on Drugs" and "Out of Mind" at Swedish TV show Nyhetsmorgon. Three days later, she held a concert at Tavastia Club in Helsinki, Finland. On 22 April 2014, Lo performed the songs from Truth Serum alongside her collaboration with Lucas Nord, "Run On Love", at live music venue Echoplex in Los Angeles. She performed the same set list for her first show in the United Kingdom at Notting Hill Arts Club on 2 April 2014. For the performance, she was accompanied by two drummers. A reviewer from Discopop stated that he was "blown away" and that it was "so refreshing to be at a pop show that engages the heart as well as the senses". Echoing this thought, Michael Cragg of The Guardian rated the show with four stars out of five and deemed it as "a punchy UK debut".

On 6 May 2014, Lo performed the songs from the EP and "Run On Love" at her Hoxton Square Bar & Kitchen show on 6 May 2014. Two days later, the singer held a concert at The Great Escape Festival in the United Kingdom. On 18 June, Lo made her first appearance on American television when she sang "Habits (Stay High)" on Late Night with Seth Meyers. A month later, she performed "Habits (Stay High)", "Out Of Mind", "Not On Drugs" and "Over" on American music television show JBTV. On 16 July 2014, Lo sang "Habits (Stay High)" and "Not on Drugs" on KROQ-FM radio station. On 1 October, the singer performed the tracks from Truth Serum at Webster Hall in Manhattan, New York City. The songs from the EP were included on the set list of Lo's first tour, the Queen of the Clouds Tour (2015).

== Critical reception ==
Professional ratings
Review scores
Source	Rating
Gaffa	(NOR) (SWE)
NME	6/10

Truth Serum received mostly positive reviews from music critics. Anita Moran of The New Zealand Herald opined that the tracks were "easy to listen to" and had "wide appeal". She also considered that the record was "too short" and that Lo's voice did not have the same intensity of Ellie Goulding's. Writing for BBC News, Mark Savage said that the EP "contains more hooks than a coat rack". Furthermore, he ranked the record at number two on his list of the top ten singles of 2014, writing that, "Every track hits you like a hurricane – the pop hooks deployed like rock riffs as Tove excavates her darkest secrets". Ben Oliver of We Listen Hear called it an "excellent debut EP" and "a collection that not only showcases a sharp new talent but sets a new standard for emotional pop music". Panisch of Out noted that the singer "manages to mesh together a warts-and-all narrative [...] with polished dance floor-ready beats". John Calvert of NME gave the extended play a mixed review; though he praised Lo's sincerity in the lyrics of "Habits (Stay High)", he criticized the production of Truth Serum, writing that it is not "anywhere near as boundary pushing, sonically – instead, it's dominated by anodyne, cliché-packed Scandi-pop". Tord Litleskare of the Norwegian publication Gaffa also gave the EP a mixed response, stating that the lyrics of the tracks were "silly and sad" and "too focused on heartbreaks and drugs".

Based on six reviews,Truth Serum received an average score of 3.2/5.0 on website Kritiker, which assigns a normalised rating out of 5.0 to reviews from mainstream critics across Sweden. Camila Astorga Díaz of the Swedish edition of Gaffa wrote that Truth Serum "fulfils its role as background music while traveling", but considered that it lacks "that one thing that makes you want to play repeat". Peter Carlsson of Allehanda called it a strong debut but stated that it did not help Lo to stand out from other pop artists. Svenska Dagbladet's Sara-Märta Höglund compared the EP to Katy Perry's Prism (2013) and stated that, "though Lo knows how to make a hit, I have wished she had ventured out on a more stripped-down production and dropped the tiresome drug romanticism".

== Commercial performance ==
Truth Serum debuted at number 25 on the Swedish Albums Chart for the issue dated 14 March 2014. On 16 May 2014, it peaked at number 13. It spent 29 weeks on the chart, and was the 49th best-selling record of 2014 in Sweden. In Norway, the record entered the Norwegian Albums Chart at number 31. It spent 23 weeks on the chart, peaking at number eight. On the Finnish Albums Chart, it reached the number 30 and stayed on the chart for a total of four weeks. In Australia, Truth Serum debuted and peaked at number 99 on the Australian Albums Chart for the issue dated 7 July 2014. In the United States, the extended play debuted at number 39 on the Billboard Top Heatseekers Albums chart. It later peaked at number six on the issue dated 20 September 2014. The record also charted on the Billboard Top Current Albums chart, peaking at number 168. Although the EP did not chart in New Zealand, it was certified Platinum by Recorded Music New Zealand (RMNZ) for equivalent sales of 15,000 units in the country.

== Track listing ==
Standard edition
No.	Title	Writer(s)	Producer(s)	Length
1.	"Love Ballad" (Swedish release only)	Tove Lo; Jakob Jerlström; Ludvig Söderberg	The Struts	3:28
2.	"Not on Drugs"	Lo; Jerlström; Söderberg; Alx Reuterskiöld	The Struts; Reuterskiöld^{[a]}	3:03
3.	"Paradise"	Lo; Michael "Scribz" Riley; Elliot Wilkins	The Struts; Scribz^{[a]}	3:03
4.	"Over"	Lo; Jason Gill; Mattias Larsson; Robin Fredriksson	The Struts; Mattman & Robin^{[a]}; Gill^{[a]}	3:44
5.	"Habits (Stay High)"	Lo; Jerlström; Söderberg	The Struts	3:29
6.	"Out of Mind"	Lo; Reuterskiöld	The Struts; Reuterskiöld^{[a]}	3:09
7.	"Stay High (Habits remix)" (featuring Hippie Sabotage)	Lo; Jerlström; Söderberg	The Struts; Hippie Sabotage^{[b]}	4:17
Total length:				20:48

Vinyl edition
No.	Title	Length
1.	"Love Ballad"	3:28
2.	"Not on Drugs"	3:03
3.	"Habits (Stay High)"	3:29
4.	"Paradise"	3:03
5.	"Over"	3:44
6.	"Out of Mind"	3:09
7.	"Stay High (Habits remix)" (featuring Hippie Sabotage) (Swedish release only)	4:17
Total length:		19:57

September 2014 re-release
No.	Title	Length
1.	"Paradise"	3:03
2.	"Over"	3:44
3.	"Habits (Stay High)" (Oliver Nelson Remix)	4:10
4.	"Out of Mind"	3:09
Total length:		14:10

=== Notes ===
- ^{^a} – signifies a co-producer
- ^{^b} – signifies a remixer

== Personnel ==
Credits for Truth Serum adapted from the Swedish version of the EP.

- Tove Lo – lead vocals
- The Struts – production, instruments, programming, keyboards, guitars
- Daniel Åberg – art direction, design
- Frederik Etoall – photography
- Robin Fredriksson – co-production
- Jason Gill – co-production
- Hippie Sabotage – featured artist, remixing, additional production, musical arrangement
- Mattias Larsson – co-production
- Lars Norgren – Mixing
- Alx Reuterskiöld – co-production, keyboards, guitars, bass, additional vocals
- Mike "Scribz" Riley – co-production, programming, keyboards
- Filip Runesson – strings
- Oskar Wettergren – hand lettering
- Elliot Wilkins – guitars

== Charts ==
=== Weekly charts ===
Chart (2014)	Peak position
Australian Albums (ARIA)	99
Australian Hitseeker Albums (ARIA)	1
Finnish Albums (Suomen virallinen lista)	30
Norwegian Albums (VG-lista)	8
Swedish Albums (Sverigetopplistan)	13
US Heatseekers Albums (Billboard)	6
US Top Current Albums (Billboard)	168

=== Year-end charts ===
Chart (2014)	Position
Swedish Albums (Sverigetopplistan)	49

== Certifications ==
Certifications for Truth Serum
Region	Certification	Certified units/sales
New Zealand (RMNZ)	Platinum	15,000^{‡}
^{‡} Sales+streaming figures based on certification alone.

== Release history ==
Country	Date	Format	Label	Ref.
Sweden	3 March 2014	Digital download	Universal Records	
United States	3 March 2014	Digital download	Island Records	
United States	4 March 2014	10" vinyl	Neon Gold Records	
United Kingdom	7 April 2014	Digital download	Polydor Records	
Sweden	21 April 2014	12" vinyl	Universal Records	
United States	23 September 2014	Digital download	Universal Records	
