= Out of Mind (song) =

2013 single by Tove Lo

Single by Tove Lo

from the EP Truth Serum and the album Queen of the Clouds: The Blueprint Edition
- Released: 16 October 2013
- Recorded: 2013
- Genre: Pop
- Length: 3:06
- Label: Universal Music
- Songwriters: Tove Nilsson; Alx Reuterskiöld
- Producers: The Struts; Alx Reuterskiöld

Tove Lo singles chronology
"Strangers" (2013)	"Out of Mind" (2013)	"Habits (Stay High)" (2013)

Music video
- "Out of Mind" on YouTube

"Out of Mind" is a song by Swedish singer Tove Lo for her debut extended play, Truth Serum (2014). The song, a pop record, was written by Lo, alongside Alx Reuterskiöld, who produced the track with The Struts. The song was released on the 16th of October, 2013 as the lead single from Truth Serum, through Universal Music. It was also her third single overall, after "Love Ballad" and the original release of "Habits".

Musically, "Out of Mind" is a pop song featuring synthesizers, guitars, bass and keys instrumentation. Its lyrics speak of the singer's inability to completely forget a former boyfriend. Its lyrical content was described by Lo and music critics alike as a sequel to "Habits (Stay High)". The song was well received by some critics, who commended its production and considered it one of the best tracks from the extended play. However, it attained little commercial success, peaking at number 39 on the Official Finnish Airplay Chart.

A music video for "Out of Mind", directed by Andreas Öhman, was released on 16 October 2013. Its imagery was based on Lo's diary and was filmed in the woods and other deserted places in Stockholm, Sweden. It shows the singer having an out-of-body experience where she releases her "demons and dark thoughts" and runs away from them. Lo performed the song several occasions, including on Swedish radio station P3, at the Norwegian by:Larm festival and at Notting Hill Arts Club in London. "Out of Mind" was also included on the set list of Lo's first tour, the Queen of the Clouds Tour (2015).

== Background and composition ==
"Out of Mind" is a pop song written by Tove Lo alongside Alx Reuterskiöld and produced by The Struts with Reuterskiöld. It has a minimal instrumentation which incorporates "a mesh of fizzing synthesizers". It was released as a single on 16 October 2013, and was later featured on the singer's debut extended play, Truth Serum (2014). According to the artist, the songs on the EP talk about her "most intense" failed relationship. In an interview with Coup de Main Magazine, she said that "'Out Of Mind' for me is kind of the step after 'Habits'... Picked up the pieces again and now just trying to glue them back together, you know? But it never really works". She further explained, "That comes after I have the pain and I'm trying to get over this heartbreak. It's when you moved on and you're sort of okay, but you still have that little scar. It will always be there. Those thoughts about this other person will always haunt you a bit". In another interview, she told that:

In its entirety, [Truth Serum tells] a love story from beginning to end. The song 'Love Ballad' is about the moment you decide to give everything to another person, while 'Habits' shows what happens when everything is screwed up and you just want to freak out. 'Out of Mind' deals with the stage after that, when your broken heart has mended, but the scars are still there.

"Out of Mind"
A sample of "Out of Mind", a pop song with a minimal instrumentation which incorporates "a mesh of fizzing synthesizers".

Some critics had similar opinions about the song's meaning. Lauren Down of The Guardian expressed that "Wrapped up in the aftermath of a relationship, 'Out Of Mind' [...] allows the pain of an ending love affair to breath". Mark Savage of BBC wrote that an indifferent person tells the singer that "time will heal her broken heart". According to Andrew Hampp of Billboard, the singer "tells off" a former boyfriend for expecting her to get over quickly their former relationship. Sam Lansky of Idolator felt that the artist shows "frustrated resignation" while she sings the line "I'll forget you, seriously". In the pre-chorus, the music vanishes and she sings "Are you kidding me?". Lansky felt that the "emotion" on the pre-chorus was "chill-inducing", while Savage wrote that "it's pained and bruised and thrilling and glorious. A moment where meaning and musical intent align perfectly". In the chorus, the singer repeats the line "You're out of your mind to think that I" and later finishes it with "could keep you out of mind", representing the "heartbreaking resolution" of the relationship.

== Reception ==
The song was met with positive reaction by critics. Gaffa Norway critic Tord Litleskare considered it "the most positive song from Truth Serum with its strong chorus and subdued verses". Additionally, he called it a "must-hear track" alongside "Habits" and "Not On Drugs". Richard S. Chang of Redbull.com ranked it at number 3 on his Top 5 Best Tove Lo songs list and wrote that "'Out Of Mind' provides the blueprint for Tove Lo's hits: soft and spare verse, followed by an explosive chorus — all fitting in nicely at just over three minutes". Under the Gun Review's Tarynn Law called it a "powerful shadow pop track" that "shows off [Tove's] outstanding vocals and just how much promise she has". Mark Savage of BBC wrote that the pre-chorus of the song was "a moment on [Truth Serum] that will take your breath away". Idolator critic Sam Lansky called it "a cinematic anthem, perfectly suited for some big heartbreak montage, with a big, gorgeous stampeding chorus that crashes in out of nowhere". He also noted that, with the song, the singer positions as "the next great Swedish pop act". "Out of Mind" entered the Official Finnish Airplay Chart at number 39 on the last week of 2013. In doing so, it became the first charting song by Tove Lo on that chart. The following week, it fell to number 52. It spent a total of six weeks on the chart.

== Music video ==
In the music video for "Out of Mind", Lo runs away from a number of flying entities, which represent "those thoughts about this other person [that] will always haunt you a bit" and "always stick with you".

On 10 August 2013, Lo announced that she had started filming the music video for her new single. The music video for "Out of Mind" was directed by Andreas Öhman, a member of Swedish production company Naive. It was filmed in the woods and in different deserted places in Stockholm. The imagery was based on Lo's diary; in an interview with Swedish website PSL, she explained that:

It started with the idea that all of my "demons and dark thoughts" would literally fly out of my head in the video. I'm trying to get rid of them, but I can't. I got help from a friend of mine to develop the idea, and when I said I was willing to lend the excerpts of my diary as inspiration for the illustrations he simply said, 'I have the perfect artist for this'. Then, the artist, Anton Ingvarsson, got a letter from me—which he later promised to burn—with excerpts I plucked out of my diary. It was incredibly scary and a little embarrassing at the same time. Then, Anton sent me some really cool graphics that he painted that set the whole tone for the video. The whole video gives me a lot of disclosure, both on the inside and on the outside but I like it. It gives me so much anxiety and pride at the same time!.

On 11 October 2013, Universal Music Sweden posted a 16 seconds teaser of the video on its YouTube channel. On 16 October 2013, it was released on Lo's VEVO channel on YouTube. The video begins with Lo lying in bed next to her boyfriend. When she starts to sing, she has an out-of-body experience. In the next scene, Lo appears in a room where she cuts her head open and releases her "demons and dark thoughts". In an interview with Artistdirect, she explained that the demons represent "those thoughts about this other person [that] will always haunt you a bit" and "always stick with you". Then, she is walking on the city streets when the demons start to follow her. She runs barefoot through the woods, where she stops and sings around the entities. At the end of the video, they flow back inside of her and Lo returns to her bedroom.

== Live performances ==
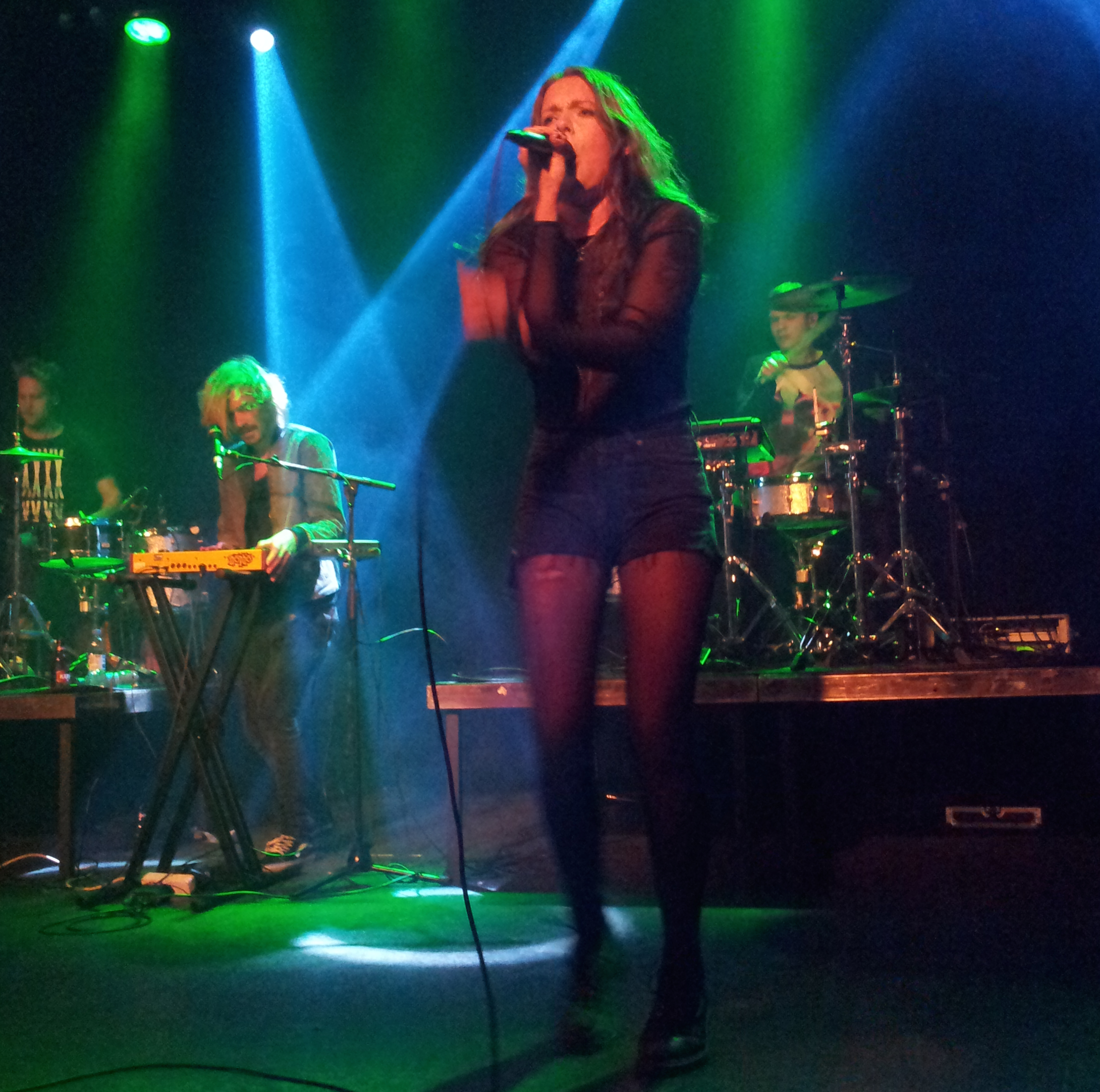
Tove Lo performing at the Tavastia Club in Helsinki in 2014.

Tove Lo performed "Out of Mind" and "Not Made For This World" for the first time alongside "Habits" and "Love Ballad" at Swedish radio station P3 on 10 April 2013. She performed it later at Swedish radio station NRJ Sverige on 27 November 2013. The following year, she performed the song at Finnish radio station Radio Xtremellä on 25 February 2014. Two days later, she performed it at the Norwegian by:Larm festival. She performed it later at Swedish TV show Nyhetsmorgon on 22 March 2014. Three days later, the artist performed the track at Tavastia Club in Helsinki, Finland.

Lo performed "Out of Mind" alongside the other songs from Truth Serum and "Run On Love" at Notting Hill Arts Club on 2 April 2014. This was her first UK show. For the performance, she was accompanied by two drummers. A reviewer from Discopop stated that he was "blown away" and that it was "so refreshing to be at a pop show that engages the heart as well as the senses". Also, Michael Cragg of The Guardian rated the show with 4 stars out of 5 and deemed it as "a punchy UK debut". She performed the same set list at her Hoxton Square Bar & Kitchen show on 6 May 2014. Two months later, she performed the song on US music TV show JBTV. On 1 October, the singer performed the song among others at Webster Hall in Manhattan, New York City. "Out of Mind" was included on the set list of Lo's first tour, the Queen of the Clouds Tour (2015).

== Credits and personnel ==
- Songwriting — Tove Lo, Alx Reuterskiöld
- Production — The Struts, Alx Reuterskiöld
- Lead vocals — Tove Lo
- Background vocals — Alx Reuterskiöld
- Programming — The Struts
- Mixing — Lars Norgren, The Struts
- Mastering — Björn Engelmann at Cutting Room, Stockholm, Sweden
- Guitars — Alx Reuterskiöld
- Bass — Alx Reuterskiöld
- Keys – Alx Reuterskiöld, The Struts

Credits are adapted from the Truth Serum liner notes.

== Charts ==
Weekly chart performance
Chart (2013)	Peak position
Finland Airplay (Radiosoittolista)	39

== Release history ==
Street dates
Country	Date	Format	Record label
Sweden	16 October 2013	Digital download	Universal Music
Norway	16 October 2013	Digital download	Universal Music
Israel	16 October 2013	Digital download	Universal Music
