= Love Ballad (Tove Lo song) =

Single by Tove Lo
- Released: 5 November 2012
- Recorded: 2012
- Genre: Pop
- Length: 3:28
- Label: Self-released
- Songwriters: Tove Lo; Ludvig Söderberg; Jakob Jerlström
- Producer: The Struts

Tove Lo singles chronology
"Love Ballad" (2012)	"Habits" (2013)

Music video
- "Love Ballad" on YouTube

"Love Ballad" is the debut single by Swedish singer Tove Lo. The song, a pop record, was recorded in 2012, and was co-written by Lo, alongside Ludvig Söderberg and Jakob Jerlström, who produced the track under their production name "The Struts". In 2012, after signing a publishing deal with Warner Chappell Music, Inc. and co-writing songs for artists including Girls Aloud and Icona Pop, Lo decided to become an independent singer to keep her most personal songs for herself.

She eventually sent "Love Ballad" to Swedish radio stations on 15 October 2012. It was digitally released on 5 November 2012. The track was later included on the Swedish version of Lo's debut extended play (EP) Truth Serum and the international version of her debut studio album Queen of the Clouds, both of which were released in 2014. "Love Ballad" is a pop song with drum instrumentation; its lyrics detail the protagonist's exaggerated ways of showing affection to a romantic partner. Critics described it as an "ode to falling dangerously in love with someone" and a parody of love songs.

The song drew the attention of music blogs and received positive reviews from some critics but failed to chart anywhere. A music video for the song, which Motellet Film and Lo directed, was released on 5 October 2012. It shows the singer covered in black paint and performing acrobatics in the middle of a road and on a football field. Lo performed the track several times, including on the Swedish campaign Musikhjälpen and at Notting Hill Arts Club in London, United Kingdom.

== Background and release ==
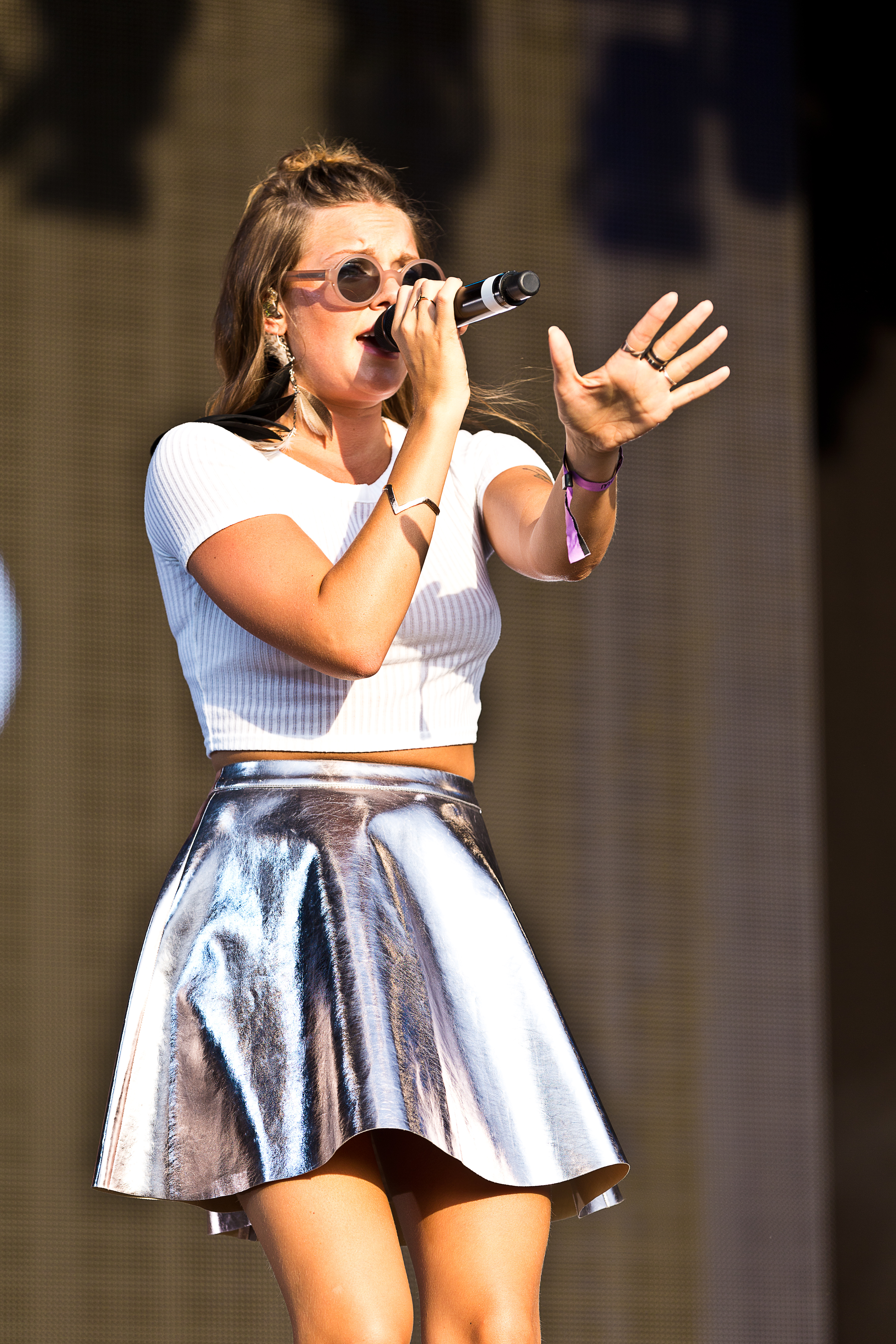
Tove Lo (pictured) wrote "Love Ballad" after confessing to feeling "lost" when writing songs for others.

After the dissolution of her band Tremblebee, Tove Lo focused on writing songs and she signed a publishing deal with Warner/Chappell Music in 2011. In the following year, she co-wrote "Something New" for Girls Aloud, and "We Got the World" and "Ready for the Weekend" for Icona Pop. After she signed the publishing deal, she felt "lost" and unsure of her identity. She was also going through a difficult time during a relationship, which led her to write songs that were not related to her life. However, at one point, she "couldn't handle it anymore" and needed to write a personal song. Lo then co-wrote "Love Ballad" with Ludvig Söderberg and Jakob Jerlström; it was their first collaboration. Söderberg and Jerlström also produced the track under their production name The Struts. According to Lo, an artist became interested in recording the song but considered it "too brutal" and wanted to change some of the lyrics. Because of this, Lo kept the song for herself. She said that after co-writing "Love Ballad", she started to write songs "that I felt I needed to get out of me".

Lo eventually self-released "Love Ballad" as her first single. It was sent to Swedish radio station P3 on 15 October 2012. It was digitally released on 5 November 2012. The song drew the attention of music blogs, which led Lo to start a career as an independent singer so she could record her most personal songs. "Love Ballad" was later featured on the Swedish edition of Lo's debut extended play Truth Serum (2014) and as a bonus track on the North American version of her debut studio album Queen of the Clouds (2014).

== Inspiration and composition ==
"Love Ballad" is an uptempo pop song featuring drum instrumentation. According to Lo, the songs on her extended play Truth Serum are about her "most intense" failed relationship. She stated, "In its entirety, [Truth Serum tells] a love story from beginning to end. The song 'Love Ballad' is about the moment you decide to give everything to another person, while 'Habits' shows what happens when everything is screwed up and you just want to freak out. 'Out of Mind' deals with the stage after that, when your broken heart has mended, but the scars are still there". In an interview with Klap Magazine, Lo said, "'Love Ballad' is actually supposed to be a way of telling the one I love I'd do anything for him. He's worth the pain. A bit exaggerated but that's what it feels like when you're so into someone".

According to Rich Thane of The Line of Best Fit, the track details the "carefree beginnings of a new romance". Michael Cragg of The Guardian described the song as an "ode to falling dangerously in love with someone". Cragg also said the singer is "willing to share her drugs" with her lover in the verse "Jump off a cliff / I'd give you my last spliff / I'd do it for you / Ain't love sweet?". According to Mark Savage of BBC News, the track "parodies the preposterous promises" made by musicians in love songs; he cited the line "Chop off my hands / Chop off my feet / I'd do it for you / Ain't love sweet?" as an example.

== Reception ==
"Love Ballad" received positive reviews by some critics. Doron Davidson-Vidavski of The Line of Best Fit called it an "infectious debut single", while a reviewer from Scandipop wrote that the song is "rousingly melodic in both its production and its topline". Michael Cragg of The Guardian said Lo had started her career "in fine style" with the song. A reviewer for Nu Wave Pony described it as a "lyrically obsessive and heart-wrenching pop song" and said that "it plays like a catchy summer song". Richard S. Chang of Redbull.com ranked it at number four on his top 5 of the Best Tove Lo songs. Writing for Discopop, Mark Savage said that "Love Ballad" is superior to "Stay High", the remixed version of "Habits (Stay High)".

Despite the positive reviews and its popularity among music blogs, "Love Ballad" failed to chart anywhere. In an interview with Gulf Times, Lo said she thought the song's poor commercial reception was due to her change of stage name. She stated, "['Love Ballad'] didn't sell particularly well. I'd used my real name, Tove Nilsson, when I was in Tremblebee so perhaps no-one knew who I was".

== Music video ==
Tove Lo covered in black house paint and walking upside-down in the music video for "Love Ballad". The singer stated that she spent more than seven hours covered in paint during the filming of the video.

The music video for "Love Ballad" was co-directed by Tove Lo and Motellet Film. Lo also wrote the video's script; she said: "Imagine sitting on a football field in the dark, freezing, after seven hours, covered only in black house paint, trying to put on fake eyelashes!". MTV Sweden premiered the video on 5 October 2012, and Lo released it on her YouTube channel on 8 October 2012.

The video begins with Lo covered in black paint and walking in the middle of a road. In the next scene, she covers four men, who go to play rugby on a football field, in paint. Later, Lo is shown walking upside-down and performing other acrobatics on the road and the football field. Then, she appears wearing a hibiscus dress while singing the song in a rubbish dump. In the next scenes, Lo is walking naked through a field of flowers. Near the end, she is standing on the football field while the four men run up to her and cover her in paint. The video is interspersed with scenes of Lo performing the song with images of cities and explosions projected onto her.

== Live performances ==
On 10 December 2012, Lo performed "Love Ballad" and "Paradise" on the Swedish campaign Musikhjälpen. On 10 April 2013, she performed "Love Ballad", "Habits (Stay High)", "Out of Mind" and "Not Made For This World" at Swedish radio station P3. Lo performed "Love Ballad" alongside other songs from Truth Serum and "Run On Love" during her first UK show at Notting Hill Arts Club, London, on 2 April 2014. For the performance, she was accompanied by two drummers. A reviewer from Discopop said he was "blown away" and that it was "so refreshing to be at a pop show that engages the heart as well as the senses". Michael Cragg of The Guardian rated the show with four stars out of five and deemed it as "a punchy UK debut". Lo performed the same set list at her Hoxton Square Bar & Kitchen show on 6 May 2014.

On 1 October 2014, Lo performed "Love Ballad" and other songs at Webster Hall in Manhattan, New York City. On 30 March 2015, she held a concert at KOKO in London, UK, and performed the track among others from Truth Serum and Queen of the Clouds. Amelia Maher of London In Stereo wrote, "With the opening bars to 'Over' and 'Love Ballad' there is something different in [Lo's] tone as she carelessly lays her soul bare for all to see and reveals that she isn't just a raunchy one trick pony". On 14 August 2015, Lo performed the song at the Way Out West festival in Gothenburg, Sweden. On 11 September 2015, she held a concert at the Deutsches Theater in Berlin, Germany, and performed "Love Ballad" and tracks from Truth Serum and Queen of the Clouds.

== Credits and personnel ==
Credits adapted from the liner notes of Truth Serum.

=== Recording locations ===
- Recorded at Warner/Chappell Studios, Stockholm
- Mastered at Cutting Room, Stockholm

=== Personnel ===
- Songwriting – Tove Lo, Jakob Jerlström, Ludvig Söderberg
- Production – The Struts
- Lead vocals – Tove Lo
- Mixing – Lars Norgren
- Programming – The Struts
- Mastering – Björn Engelmann
- Instrumentation – The Struts

== Release history ==
Country	Date	Format	Ref.
Sweden	15 October 2012	Mainstream radio	
Worldwide	5 November 2012	Digital download	
