= Habits (Stay High) =

2013 single by Tove Lo

Single by Tove Lo

from the EP Truth Serum and the album Queen of the Clouds
- Written: 2012
- Released: 15 March 2013 (independent); 6 December 2013 (Universal)
- Recorded: 2012–2013
- Studio: Warner/Chappell (Stockholm)
- Genre: Pop; electropop
- Length: 3:29
- Label: Island; Republic
- Songwriters: Tove Nilsson; Ludvig Söderberg; Jakob Jerlström
- Producer: The Struts

Tove Lo singles chronology
"Love Ballad" (2012)	"Habits (Stay High)" (2013)	"Run on Love" (2013)

Alternative cover
- Original single artwork of the song under the title of "Habits" (Note: After Lo was signed to Universal, it was re-released under the new title of "Habits (Stay High)".)

"Habits (Stay High)" is a song recorded by Swedish singer-songwriter Tove Lo for her debut extended play, Truth Serum, and debut studio album, Queen of the Clouds (2014). It was written by Lo with Ludvig Söderberg and Jakob Jerlström, while it was produced by the latter two under the production name the Struts. The song was recorded from 2012 to 2013, at Warner/Chappell Studios, based in Stockholm, Sweden. Initially, the singer self-released the song under the title "Habits" on 15 March 2013 as her second independently released single.

After Lo was signed to Universal Music, the track was re-released on 6 December 2013 under the title of "Habits (Stay High)" as both the second single from Truth Serum and the lead single from Queen of the Clouds. Musically, it is a pop and electropop song which features a minimal and upbeat electronic instrumentation. Its lyrics delve into the singer's attempts to forget her previous boyfriend through substance abuse, drinking and other hedonistic practices. Consequently, some music critics and Lo herself noted a contrast between the song's production and its lyrical content.

"Habits (Stay High)" was well received by most critics, who commended its lyrics and production. The track became a sleeper hit; it entered the music charts in 2014, one year after its original release. The recording peaked at number three on the Billboard Hot 100 in the United States and became the highest-charting song by a Swedish artist on that chart since "The Sign" by Ace of Base peaked at number one in 1994. It was certified 8× platinum by the Recording Industry Association of America (RIAA) and has sold over 2.6 million copies in the country. Additionally, the track topped the charts in Poland and Romania, and peaked within the top ten in Austria, Canada, France and Switzerland, among others.

Two music videos were filmed for the song, both directed by Motellet Film. The first version, released on 15 March 2013, featured the singer at a tea party while getting drunk with her guests. It reached half-a-million views on YouTube before it was made private one year after its release. It was made public again in March 2023. The second version was filmed at a Swedish club over three days and depicts Lo in a night of partying with her friends. The singer performed the single at festivals such as South by Southwest and the Hangout Music Festival, and included it on the set list of her tours, the Queen of the Clouds Tour (2015) and the Lady Wood Tour (2017).

The single was awarded the Song of the Year award at the Grammis of 2015 in Sweden. A remix by record production duo Hippie Sabotage, titled "Stay High", was released as the third single from Truth Serum and reached the top ten in Australia, New Zealand, the United Kingdom and other countries in Europe. The song has been covered by artists such as Vin Diesel, whose performance was a tribute to his late friend Paul Walker, and Kelly Clarkson, who performed the track on her Piece by Piece Tour (2015).

== Background and release ==
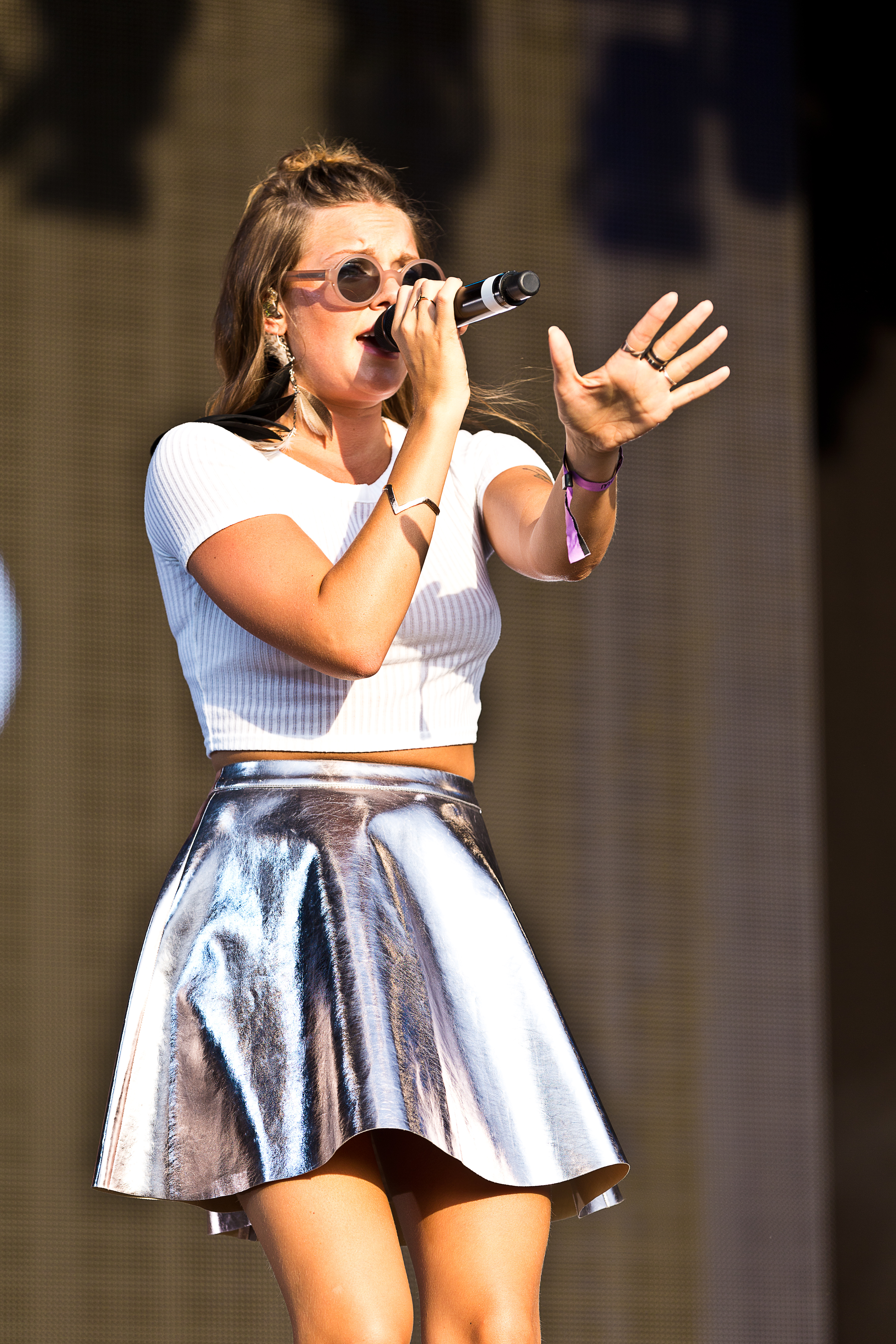
Tove Lo (pictured) wrote "Habits (Stay High)" during 2012's Hurricane Sandy.

"Habits (Stay High)" was written by Tove Lo alongside Ludvig Söderberg and Jakob Jerlström, while produced by Söderberg and Jerlström under the production name the Struts. Initially, Lo signed a publishing deal with Warner/Chappell Music in 2011, and co-wrote songs for Icona Pop and Girls Aloud. She later released her debut single, "Love Ballad", in October 2012, which drew the attention from some music blogs. This encouraged her to start a career as an independent singer so she could record her most personal songs. According to Lo, "Habits (Stay High)" is the song from Truth Serum (2014) that means the most to her because of its honest lyrics and extended writing process. Initially, the verses of the song were part of a poem written by Lo when she was going through a difficult time in a relationship. Later, Lo's boyfriend became part of a Buddhist movement but she refused to join, which led the relationship to an end. After that, she started using drugs and drinking in order to forget him. Months after the relationship ended, she was staying at a friend's apartment in New York City, during 2012's Hurricane Sandy. When the apartment lost electricity and heat, Lo went on to stay at her friend's studio in Midtown, New York City, where she wrote the chorus. The process of writing and finishing the song had taken around three years in total, Lo revealed in 2024 for Queen of the Clouds' tenth anniversary, as it went through five different versions of the chorus.

On 11 December 2012, she announced through her Facebook account that she did not get to finish some of the projects she was working on in New York and that she was collaborating in the studio with the Struts in Sweden. The singer decided to use the vocals she recorded for the demo on the song because her vocal performance "was really coming from the heart". The Struts co-wrote, produced and programmed the track, and additionally played the keys. Filip Runesson played the strings, with Lars Norgren mixing the song and Björn Engelmann mastering it. In an interview with Coup de Main magazine, Lo said that: "[While writing the song, I was thinking about] my way of getting through a hard time in 'the best' possible way. It's a big relief to just think 'fuck it all' for a while. We all have to be so perfect, and absolutely no one can live up to it." She later confessed to The Huffington Post that she recovered from the break-up after writing the song.

On 15 March 2013, the singer released the track, under the title "Habits". It was her second independently released single, after "Love Ballad" (2012). The song drew the attention of music blogs, which gained Lo an online following. Welsh singer Marina and the Diamonds and New Zealand artist Lorde praised the song through their Twitter accounts. Subsequently, the recording was re-released under the title "Habits (Stay High)" on 6 December 2013 through Universal Music as the second single from Lo's debut EP Truth Serum, as well as the lead single from her debut studio album Queen of the Clouds (2014). It was made available for digital consumption in the United States on 14 January 2014. On 17 June 2014, it was sent to US contemporary hit radio. About the song's re-release, the singer explained in an interview with The Untitled Magazine that, after the attention the track gained from music blogs, she signed a record deal with Universal Music. Then, the label representatives decided to re-release it with proper promotion as they believe it still had commercial potential.

== Composition ==
"Habits (Stay High)"
20-second sample of "Habits (Stay High)", a pop and electropop song about the singer's attempts to overcome a failed relationship through drug abuse. Consequently, some critics and Lo herself noted a contrast between the track's production and its lyrical content.

"Habits (Stay High)" is a pop and electropop song. In an interview with AP Entertainment, the singer stated that the song's lyrics describe her behaviour during the time she wrote it, when she was devastated and trying to overcome a former relationship. She also remarked that the main theme of "Habits (Stay High)" is the suffering she experienced despite her attempts to numb the pain. Echoing this thought, Lo further confessed that: "I can't lie. What I'm singing about is my life. It's the truth. I've had moments where [drug-taking] has been a bigger part than it should be. It's hard to admit to, and I could filter it or find another metaphor for it – but it doesn't feel right to me." According to the artist, the songs on the Truth Serum EP talk about her most intense failed relationship. Following the narrative of the EP, Lo indicated that the track talks about the part when the relationship is over and she is trying to get on with her life in "not the healthiest way". The recording was also included in "The Pain" section of Lo's debut studio album, Queen of the Clouds, a concept album that describes the pattern of the singer's relationships.

The song is composed in the key of D minor and set in common time signature, with it having a dance pop tempo of 110 beats per minute. Lo's vocals span from the low note of B♭_{3} to the high note of C_{5}.The song has a minimal and upbeat electronic instrumentation which consists of drums, bass, backup vocals and Lo's voice. The song starts with the words "oh oh", which repeat after every sentence of the verses. The song contains a total of 18 4-note millennial whoops, a vocal melody repeating on the fifth and third notes in a major scale. Some critics noted a contrast between the track's lyrics and production. Carrie Battan of Pitchfork stated that the song "contrasts a giant hook and chorus with snappy verses filled with quietly distinct, often strange imagery: of [Lo] eating her dinner in the bathtub, getting drunken munchies, seducing dads on playgrounds". Chris Jordan of Asbury Park Press described "Habits (Stay High)" as a "synth-based pop song with a sweeping chorus", but noted that the lyrical content of the track was similar to that of Rock 'n' Roll music. The singer herself stated that: "You can feel the lyrics and the dark and sad but if you combine it with, brings a little to the dark humor as well. I like the thing of dancing along and then listening to what I'm actually saying."

The song's lyrics delve into Lo's hedonistic attempts to forget her former boyfriend. According to Markos Papadatos of Digital Journal, the narrator describes her attempts to overcome a failed relationship through binge eating and alcohol, as indicated in the lyrics about having the munchies, eating Twinkies, and throwing up during the first verse. In the chorus, she sings about drug abuse: "You're gone and I gotta stay high / All the time, to keep you off my mind". The singer confessed to iHeartRadio that the song's bridge is her favorite part of the track because "that just says everything [that the] song is about for me". However, Billboard's Jeremy D. Larson considered the song's message untrue because "staying high does not keep anyone off your mind".

== Critical reception ==
"Habits (Stay High)" was well received by most critics. Harley Brown of Billboard wrote that the track is "one of the most easily identifiable pop songs [she has] heard in recent memory: everyone's gotten high, maybe eaten too many Twinkies, and regretted life decisions, but not everyone makes a really superb song about it". Pitchfork's Carrie Battam stated that the track's hook and production make the lyrics "sound gracefully sad instead of tragic". In her review of Queen of the Clouds, Battam called it "a big, sticky song, but not so big that it stuns your senses or numbs you into enjoyment". Ewald Arndt of FDRMX said that "Habits (Stay High)" is "so fun to listen to" despite its sad themes. AllMusic's Heather Phares called it "the Queen of the Clouds's standout track, while Sam Lansky of Idolator stated that it "has a little of the texture of Kesha's no-fucks-given party-girl pop but with the languorous sadness of Robyn" and that "It'll get stuck in your head, which is right where it deserves to be." Nick Murray of Rolling Stone labeled it as Truth Serum's best track, and compared it with the music of American rapper Kendrick Lamar.

Bradley Stern of MuuMuse called it "the younger, more Swedish-sounding sister" to Sia's "Chandelier" (2014), while Markos Papadatos of Digital Journal considered it an "anthem of female empowerment". Alex Kritselis of Bustle opined that "Habits (Stay High)" was a dramatic song, but further stated that the "sadness, anxiety and terror" in the singer's voice were authentic. Michael Cragg of The Guardian called it the stand out track from Truth Serum and deemed it as "brilliantly frank". Neil McCormick of The Daily Telegraph considered it a straightforward song about hedonism with a "fantastic" chorus. However, some critics gave the song mixed reviews. Jason Lipshutz of Billboard said that "Habits (Stay High)" was one of the weaker tracks of Queen of the Clouds, while Jillian Mapes of the same magazine stated that it was "a little too same-y amidst artists like Lorde and Banks".

== Recognition and accolades ==
The staff of The Line of Best Fit ranked "Habits (Stay High)" at number 6 on their list of the 50 Best Tracks of 2013 and wrote that it was "easily one of the most vital pop songs of the year". Rolling Stone ranked the recording at number 23 on their list of the 50 Best songs of 2014 and compared the song's production to that of Lorde's music and the lyrics to those of Kesha's songs. Chris Jordan of Asbury Park Press deemed it as one of the best singles of that year and stated that "it was refreshing to hear the debauchery depicted" in the song. Echoing this thought, Chris DeVille of Stereogum ranked the track at number 26 on his list of Top 50 Pop Songs of 2014 and confessed that: "For a song that derives much of its appeal from being out-of-control and over-the-top, 'Habits' is a work of extreme poise and precision from a pop songwriter with a blindingly bright future." Entertainment Weekly's Miles Raymer selected the line "I eat my dinner in my bathtub / Then I go to sex clubs / Watching freaky people gettin' it on" on his list of the best lyrics of 2014 and wrote that it was "one of the most interesting images to come out of a pop singer's mouth this year".

"Habits (Stay High)" received the accolade for Song of the Year at the Swedish Grammis Awards of 2015. At the ASCAP Pop Music Awards, it was recognized by the American Society of Composers, Authors and Publishers (ASCAP) as one of the most performed songs of 2014. The single was further awarded with a Pop Award at the 2015 BMI London Awards. At the 2015 iHeartRadio Music Awards, "Habits (Stay High)" received a nomination for the Best Lyrics award, but lost to "Blank Space" (2014) by Taylor Swift. It was also nominated for Top Streaming Song (Audio) at the 2015 Billboard Music Awards.

== Commercial performance ==
In the United States, "Habits (Stay High)" became a sleeper hit. It made its first appearances on the Billboard charts when it debuted at number 34 on the Rock Airplay and at number 36 on the Alternative Songs. It eventually debuted at number 66 on the Billboard Hot 100 for the issue dated 14 June 2014. On 15 October 2014, the song became part of an all-female top five on the Hot 100 when it ascended from number six to number four on the chart. In its twenty-second week on the chart, the track peaked at number three, and held that position the following week. In doing so, it became the highest-charting song by a Swedish act on the Billboard Hot 100 since "The Sign" by Ace of Base peaked at number one in 1994. "Habits (Stay High)" topped the Radio Songs chart on the issue dated 22 November 2014, becoming the sixth song by a debut artist to reach the top of the chart in 2014.

On the Pop Songs chart, it debuted at number 40. "Habits (Stay High)" topped the chart on the issue dated 15 November 2014, becoming the seventh song by a debut artist to reach the number one spot in 2014. It remained on the top of it the following week. On the Rock Songs chart, "Habits (Stay High)" debuted at number nine on the issue dated 14 June 2014. In its twelfth week, it climbed to number one, becoming the third song by a woman or female-led act to top the chart, after Lorde's "Royals" (2013) and Paramore's "Ain't It Fun" (2014). The recording topped the chart for six consecutive weeks. As of January 2016, it had sold 2.6 million copies in the United States and was certified eight-times Platinum by the Recording Industry Association of America (RIAA). In Canada, "Habits (Stay High)" debuted at number 86 on the Canadian Hot 100 for the issue dated 5 July 2014. It eventually peaked at number three, and was certified double-platinum by Music Canada, which denotes 160,000 downloads. It was the second-most-streamed song of the second half of 2014 in the country, with 1.3 million streams in that period. In Mexico, the song peaked at number ten on the Mexico Airplay chart and spent 16 weeks on it. The single found more success on the Mexico Inglés Airplay chart, where it reached number three and spent thirty-two weeks.

"Habits (Stay High)" charted in various European countries. It spent one week on the Euro Digital Songs, where it peaked at number 19. In Germany, the song debuted at number 79 on the Top 100 Singles chart on 30 May 2014. It eventually peaked at number 14 and spent 53 weeks on the chart. It was certified triple-gold by the Bundesverband Musikindustrie (BVMI), denoting 450,000 sales in the country. In France, the song peaked at number two on the Top Singles Téléchargés chart for the issue dated 6 September 2014. According to Pure Charts, the song sold over 88,600 copies during 2014 in France, becoming the thirteenth best-selling song of that year in that country. It spent a total of 75 non-consecutive weeks on the chart between 2014 and 2016. It also reached number two on the airplay chart and topped the streaming chart of the country. In Hungary, the recording peaked at number nine on the sales chart and at number eight on the streaming chart, both published by the Association of Hungarian Record Companies (MAHASZ).

In Poland, the song debuted at number 11 on the Polish Airplay Chart for the issue dated 1 November 2014. It eventually topped the chart for four consecutive weeks. In Denmark, the song debuted and peaked at number ten on the Track Top 40 chart. It further reached number six on the Airplay Top 20 chart, and received a Platinum certification accorded by IFPI Denmark, denoting 2,600,000 streams in the country. "Habits (Stay High)" peaked at number three in both Austria and Switzerland, and was certified Gold in both countries by the International Federation of the Phonographic Industry (IFPI). In Romania, the song topped the International Airplay Songs Chart on the issue dated 15 December 2014. It reached the top ten on the digital chart of Czech Republic, Luxembourg, Portugal and Slovakia. In Spain, it peaked at number 13 on both the sales and airplay singles charts published by the Productores de Música de España (PROMUSICAE).

== Music videos ==
=== First version ===
On 1 February 2013, Motellet Film announced on their Twitter account that they were shooting a music video for Tove Lo. On 27 February, they announced that they had finished it and posted a photo of Lo on the set. The duo directed the video, with the singer co-directing it and writing its script. The video was produced by Swedish production company IAM with Martin Roeck Hansen as Creative Producer and Fredrik Bjelke as producer. Swedish website PSL premiered it on 15 March 2013, while the singer posted it on her YouTube channel two days later.

The video begins with the singer recalling memories from a hangover, including images of whiskey, a shoe in a chandelier, and her making out with a man flash on the screen, particularly getting a bottle of whiskey and drinking it with him. In the following scene, Lo is seen at a tea party with four other women and the waitresses, where they drink champagne amongst an array of cakes and cupcakes. As the video flashes white, it shows a glimpse of the other women's fantasies. Then, Lo becomes drunk, takes her shirt off, smears cake on her face, pours champagne on herself and starts to dance with her guests and the waitresses. In the following scene, she makes out with the man she was drinking with. The visual ends with the singer being at home while vomiting into a sink. Scenes interspersed through the main plot portray Lo in a dark room, with mascara dripping from her eyes while doing activities such as blowing bubble gum, eating melting ice cream, and smoking a cigarette.

Despite the video's plot, Lo wanted to depict the imagery in an "artistic" perspective, explaining that "the dark undertone is key for the whole video". As of 14 March 2014, it received nearly 530,000 views on YouTube. However, it was made private that same month, becoming unavailable to view. The video was made public again in March 2023.

=== Second version ===
Tove Lo partying with her friends in the second music video for "Habits (Stay High)", in which the singer wanted to "show this kind of night where things can get out of control".

The second music video for "Habits (Stay High)" was also directed by Motellet Film. It was filmed at a Swedish club in the span of three days, where the singer spent time with three friends who were asked to "have a few drinks and make out" with her. Consequently, the directors filmed a large amount of natural footage because there was not a specific "direction". Regarding the fact that two of her friends were women, Lo expressed: "There are girls in there—one of them is my best friend. That should be OK, that shouldn't even be a thing." In the video, the singer wanted to "show this kind of night where things can get out of control" and the viewers to "go slowly into this emotional turmoil" represented in the lyrics of the song. She explained: "I want people to know what I'm feeling. I want it to really reflect the song. So I wanted to make a video that I'm not able to watch, which is kind of what it is."

Lo found the shooting difficult and exhausting because she had to walk around with a 22-pound camera strapped around her waist for the three days of the filming. She also stated that it was "draining" to represent the pain she felt when she wrote the track. At one point during the filming, Lo was drunk and tired, so she decided to go into the bathroom stall; concerning this, the singer confessed that: "I was wasted and tired and it was a tough recording and I really just went into the bathroom and sat there by myself. There weren't any people around then and I was just really alone in that stall. I just sat there and thought of anything that was happening during that time. The tears just came." She also confessed that she barely remembered half of the recording. On 19 February 2014, she posted a teaser of the video on her Facebook account. On 17 March 2014, the music video was released via Lo's Vevo channel on YouTube, and was made available for consumption on the iTunes Store the next day.

The video begins with Lo waking up at a friend's house after a night of partying. Then, she returns home, where she recovers from her hangover and prepares for another night of partying while trying on numerous outfits. She meets with her friends and goes to a club, where she gets drunk and starts to make out with them. Subsequently, she goes to the bathroom stall alone and starts to cry. After that, she returns home and collapses into her bed. Scenes interspersed through the main plot of the visual display Lo staring at the camera while lip syncing the lyrics of the song. Miles Raymer of Entertainment Weekly called it a "clever" video that "showcases Lo's artfully complicated party-girl image as she recreates some of the debauchery in her lyrics, as well as some of its after-effects". Caitlin White of Noisey said that the "new video for 'Habits' shows the darker side of coping with a lost love" and that it "may remind you of Janis Joplin a bit". Sonya Mann of Bustle considered it "kind of boring". The clip was the fifth most-popular video on VH1 during 2014. Additionally, it won the accolade for Best Alternative/Rock video at the 2014 VEVO Hot This Year Awards.

== Live performances ==
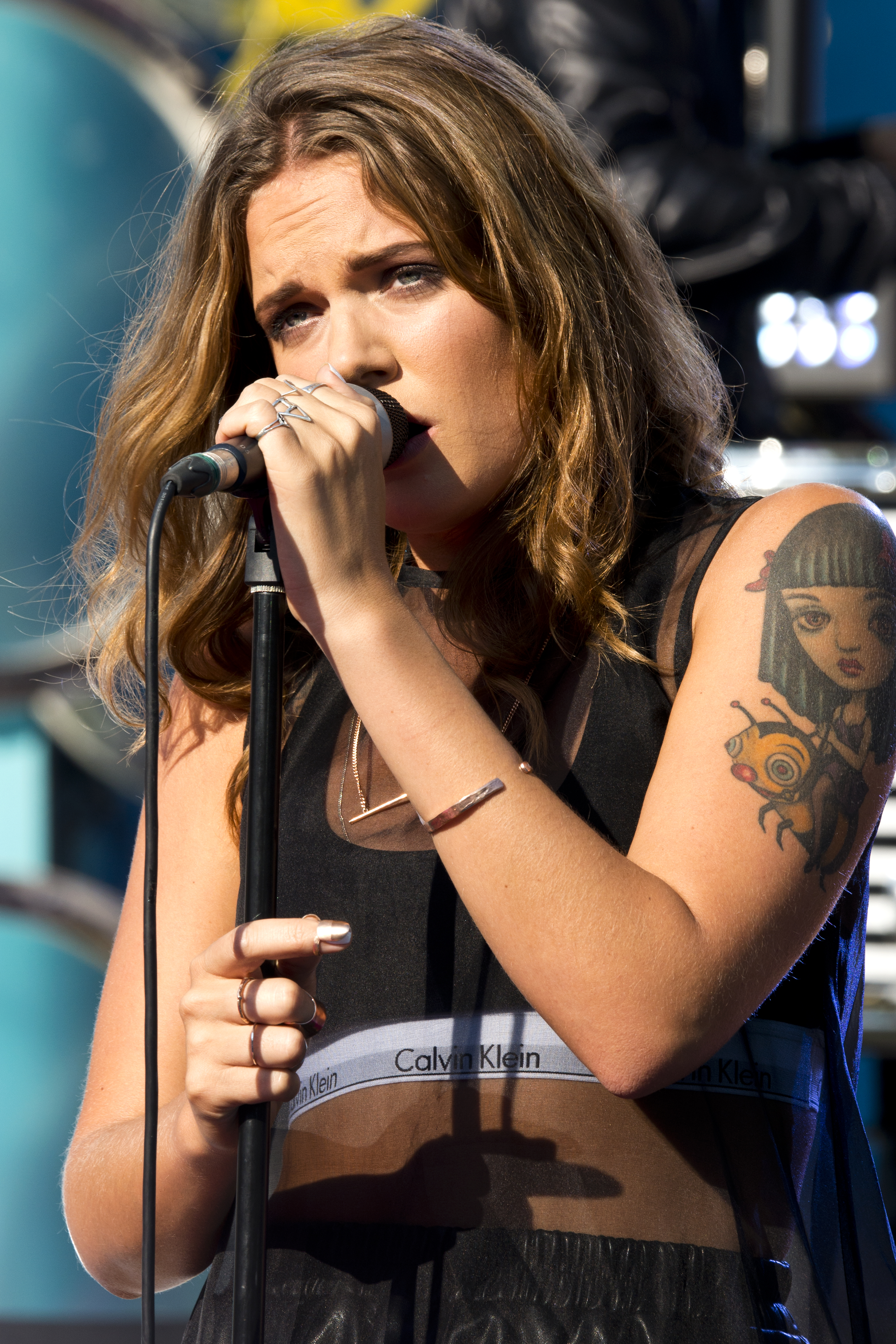
Tove Lo performing "Habits (Stay High)" during the Swedish Sommarkrysset television program in 2014.

The singer performed "Habits (Stay High)" alongside "Love Ballad", "Out of Mind" and "Not Made For This World" at Swedish radio station, P3, on 10 April 2013. On 7 May, Lo sang the song in a live session for PSL in Sweden. Rich Thane of The Line of Best Fit said that, despite the "smoky room and poor light", the performance was "wonderfully emotive". On 27 February 2014, Lo performed the track at the Norwegian festival by:Larm. The following month, she sang the song alongside "Not on Drugs" and other songs from Truth Serum at the South by Southwest festival. On 25 March, the singer held a concert at the Tavastia Club in Helsinki, Finland and performed the track among other material from Truth Serum. Lo also sang "Habits (Stay High)" alongside the other songs from Truth Serum and "Run On Love" for her first show in the United Kingdom at Notting Hill Arts Club on 2 April 2014. Michael Cragg of The Guardian rated the show with four stars out of five and deemed it as "a punchy UK debut". Lo performed the same set list at her Hoxton Square Bar & Kitchen show on 6 May 2014. On 8 May, the singer sang the track during the Great Escape Festival in the United Kingdom.

On 18 June, Lo made her first appearance on US TV when she performed "Habits (Stay High)" on Late Night with Seth Meyers. On 1 July, Lo sang it in a live session for The Line of Best Fit. In that same month, Lo sang the song alongside "Not on Drugs" on KROQ-FM radio station. On 26 July, the singer performed the track on the Sommarkrysset television program in Gröna Lund, Stockholm. The following month, Lo appeared on the Conan talk show where she sang the song, as well. On 23 September 2014, Lo performed "Habits (Stay High)" while barefoot on Jimmy Kimmel Live! to promote the release of Queen of the Clouds. On 17 May 2015, the singer performed the single at the Hangout Music Festival. The artist also sang it during Lollapalooza Chile in April 2017, and two months later on her Glastonbury Festival set. Lo performed "Habits (Stay High)" during the encore of her tours, the Queen of the Clouds Tour (2015) and the Lady Wood Tour (2017).

== Charts ==
=== Weekly charts ===
Weekly chart performance for original version
Chart (2014–15)	Peak position
Austria (Ö3 Austria Top 40)	3
Canada Hot 100 (Billboard)	3
Canada AC (Billboard)	46
Canada CHR/Top 40 (Billboard)	1
Canada Hot AC (Billboard)	9
Canada Rock (Billboard)	42
Czech Republic Airplay (ČNS IFPI)	12
Czech Republic Singles Digital (ČNS IFPI)	3
Denmark (Tracklisten)	10
Denmark Airplay (Tracklisten)	6
Europe (Euro Digital Songs)	19
France (SNEP)	2
Germany (Official German Charts)	14
Germany (Airplay Chart)	7
Hungary (Single Top 40)	9
Hungary (Stream Top 40)	8
Iceland (RÚV)	18
Ireland (IRMA)	80
Italy (FIMI)	53
Luxembourg (Billboard)	10
Mexico (Billboard Mexican Airplay)	10
Mexico (Billboard Ingles Airplay)	3
Mexico Anglo (Monitor Latino)	1
Poland Airplay (ZPAV)	1
Poland (Video Chart)	5
Portugal (Billboard)	2
Romania (Airplay 100)	2
Romania (International Airplay Songs Chart)	1
Scotland (Official Charts Company)	71
Slovakia Airplay (ČNS IFPI)	8
Slovakia Singles Digital (ČNS IFPI)	5
Slovenia (SloTop50)	8
Spain (Promusicae)	13
Spain (Airplay Chart)	13
Switzerland (Schweizer Hitparade)	3
Switzerland (Airplay Chart)	4
UK Singles Downloads (Official Charts)	80
US Billboard Hot 100	3
US Adult Pop Airplay (Billboard)	2
US Dance Club Songs (Billboard)	30
US Dance Airplay (Billboard)	3
US Hot Rock & Alternative Songs (Billboard)	1
US Pop Airplay (Billboard)	1
US Rhythmic Airplay (Billboard)	8
US Rock & Alternative Airplay (Billboard)	16

=== Year-end charts ===
Annual chart rankings for original version
Chart (2014)	Position
Austria (Ö3 Austria Top 40)	62
Canada (Canadian Hot 100)	41
France (SNEP)	13
France (Classements Radios)	36
Germany (Official German Charts)	66
Hungary (Singles Chart)	65
Hungary (Stream Chart)	35
Switzerland (Schweizer Hitparade)	39
US Billboard Hot 100	32
US Mainstream Top 40 (Billboard)	30
US Rock Airplay (Billboard)	47
US Alternative Songs (Billboard)	46

Chart (2015)	Position
Canada (Canadian Hot 100)	55
Slovenia (SloTop50)	18
Switzerland (Schweizer Hitparade)	71
US Billboard Hot 100	77
US Adult Top 40 (Billboard)	33
US Dance/Mix Show Airplay (Billboard)	49

== Certifications ==
Certifications and sales for original version
Region	Certification	Certified units/sales
Austria (IFPI Austria)	Gold	15,000^{*}
Brazil (Pro-Música Brasil)	2× Diamond	500,000^{‡}
Canada (Music Canada)	2× Platinum	160,000^{*}
Denmark (IFPI Danmark)	2× Platinum	180,000^{‡}
France (SNEP)	Gold	88,600
Germany (BVMI)	3× Gold	450,000^{‡}
Italy (FIMI)	Platinum	50,000^{‡}
Spain (Promusicae)	Platinum	60,000^{‡}
Sweden (GLF)	3× Platinum	120,000^{‡}
Switzerland (IFPI Switzerland)	Gold	15,000^{^}
United Kingdom (BPI)	Platinum	600,000^{‡}
United States (RIAA)	8× Platinum	8,000,000^{‡}
Streaming
Denmark (IFPI Danmark)	Platinum	2,600,000^{†}
^{*} Sales figures based on certification alone.^{^} Shipments figures based on certification alone.^{‡} Sales+streaming figures based on certification alone.^{†} Streaming-only figures based on certification alone.

== Hippie Sabotage remix ==
"Stay High"

Single by Tove Lo featuring Hippie Sabotage

from the EP Truth Serum and the album Queen of the Clouds
- Released: 25 February 2014
- Recorded: 2013
- Genre: Alternative; EDM
- Length: 4:18
- Label: Universal Music
- Songwriters: Tove Nilsson; Ludvig Söderberg; Jakob Jerlström
- Producers: The Struts; Hippie Sabotage (remix)

Tove Lo singles chronology
"Out of Mind" (2013)	"Stay High" (2014)	"Heroes" (2014)

Audio sample
- file; help

Music video
- "Stay High" on YouTube

A remix of "Habits (Stay High)" by American record production duo Hippie Sabotage, alternatively titled "Stay High", (Note: Hippie Sabotage posted their remix version on their SoundCloud account as "Stay High" (Tove Lo Flip). It was later released as a single under the title of "Stay High". When Truth Serum was released, the remix was titled "Stay High (Habits remix)". In the track listing of Queen of the Clouds, the remix is titled "Habits (Stay High) [Hippie Sabotage remix]".) was released on 25 February 2014 as the third single from Truth Serum. The remix peaked at number 13 on the Swedish Singles Chart and reached the top ten of the charts in Australia, New Zealand, Norway, the Netherlands and the United Kingdom. Some journalists attributed its commercial success to British singer Ellie Goulding, who shared the track through her Instagram account. "Stay High" received a nomination for Song of the Year at the P3 Guld 2015 awards in Sweden, but lost to "Knäpper Mina Fingrar (Remix)" by Linda Pira.

=== Background and composition ===
Initially, a shortened version of the remix was featured on Stay High, a two-minutes short film directed by Aris Jerome and starring model Chanelle Elise, posted on Jerome's Vimeo and YouTube accounts on 11 April 2013. On 18 September 2013, Hippie Sabotage posted the remix's official version on their SoundCloud account and released it as a free digital download. However, it was later removed. The singer and the duo never met; Lo first listened to "Stay High" when a friend of hers showed her a surf video with the remix on it. She eventually found Hippie Sabotage's Twitter account and asked them to send her the track via email. After that, both the duo and the singer agreed to feature it on Truth Serum. Lo stated that "Stay High" wasn't planned to be released as a single until radio programmers in the United Kingdom started to feature it on their playlists. It was finally released on 25 February 2014 as a digital download through Universal Music and Island. On 24 March 2014, it was sent to British BBC Radio 1.

"Stay High" has been described as an alternative EDM track. Its instrumentation consists of a "soft" bass beat, and Lo's "distorted" vocals. Tyler Almodovar of Raver Rafting noted that the track "is relatively simple, with most of the focus directed at the ethereal vocals" provided by Lo. For the remix, Hippie Sabotage increased the speed and the pitch of the original track, and reworked Lo's vocals. Digital Spy's Amy Davidson said that the lyrics talk about a "decadent devotion to a night 'where the fun ain't got no end'". Miles Raymer of Entertainment Weekly wrote that the remix shared "a similar theme of getting through emotional struggles with copious amounts of chemical assistance" with the original version, although feeling that the latter was "more bluntly honest". In an interview with PopBytes, Lo told that "I just love how [Hippie Sabotage have] made a proper dance remix of the song, but it still has that darkness to it. It’s just the way that they used all the parts. They did a genius job on it."

=== Critical reception ===
"I'm obviously grateful to [Hippie Sabotage] for the work they did on my song. I hope the popularity of 'Stay High' will encourage more people to listen to my other songs."

— Lo talking about the remix.

"Stay High" received mostly positive reviews. Anita Moran of The New Zealand Herald wrote on her review of Truth Serum that it was the EP's best track. In a positive review, Tyler Almodovar of Raver Rafting stated that: "'Stay High' doesn't have any rapid build-ups or explosive drops, and it doesn't need them, its impactful moments are successful enough on their own." Furthermore, Almodovar included the track on his list of 10 Songs to Ease You Into EDM and said that the "soft bass and beautiful lyrics make it an appropriate introduction to the genre". Additionally, Lewis Corner of Digital Spy ranked it at number 14 on his list of the best singles of 2014, and Reed Fischer of Rolling Stone described it as a "sadness vs. inebriation tug-of-war". Neil McCormick of The Daily Telegraph called it a "radical remix" that reduced the original song to a "druggy wisp". However, "Stay High" also received mixed reviews. Amy Davidson of Digital Spy said that the original song was the "most satisfying". Miles Raymer of Entertainment Weekly wrote that the original track was arguably better than the remix and expressed that the latter "lacks the directness" of the former. Kitty Empire of The Guardian criticized the singer's reworked vocals, saying that the remix "loops Lo's vocal into a chipmunky travesty".

OMD frontman Andy McCluskey praised the Hippie Sabotage remix, while citing it as an inspiration: "The reduced programming and pitched up vocals take it to an incredible sonic higher plane. More fragile and poignant [than the original]. This was just what I needed to hear when looking for a new way to distill my own band's musical direction."

=== Commercial performance ===
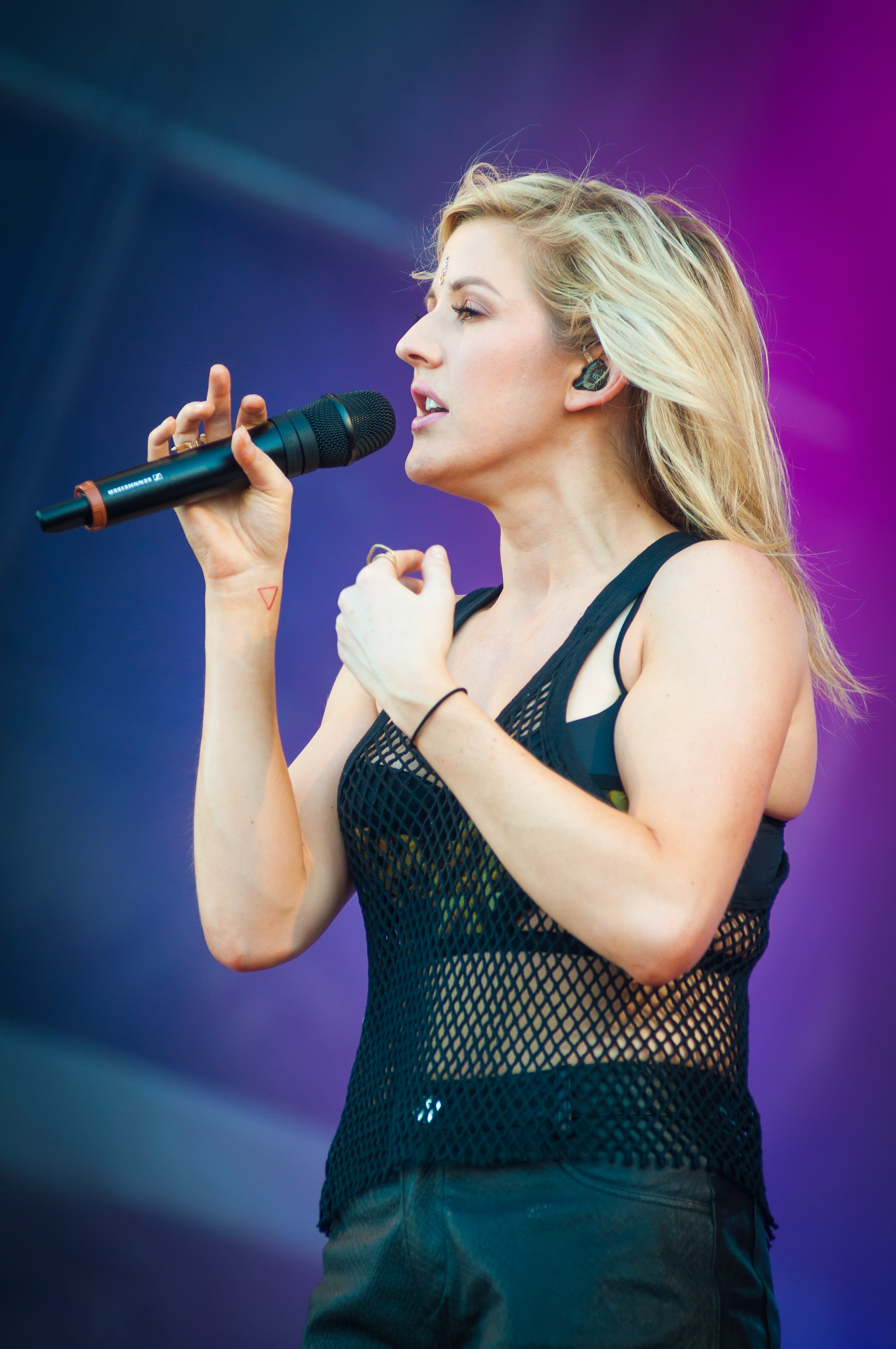
"Stay High" entered the charts in the United Kingdom and Scotland after Ellie Goulding (pictured) posted it on her Instagram account.

"Stay High" charted in Australia, New Zealand and some European countries. In March 2014, British singer Ellie Goulding shared the remix through her Instagram account. After that, it entered the top 100 singles chart on the iTunes Store in the United Kingdom. Mike Wass of Idolator attributed the track's "surprising" success to Goulding's post and pointed out that it was "an incredible feat for a gloomy, alt-EDM remix that has been floating around online for the last six months". "Stay High" eventually debuted at number 59 on the UK Singles Chart for the issue dated 16 March 2014. In its sixth week on the chart, it peaked at number six. It was certified 2× Platinum by the British Phonographic Industry (BPI), which denotes 1,200,000 units sold in the country. In Scotland, it entered the Scottish Singles Chart at number 65 on the same week it debuted on the UK Singles Chart. On 4 May 2014, it peaked at number eight. In Ireland, the remix debuted at number 92 on the Top 100 Singles chart. It reached a peak of number 49 on 5 June 2014, and spent a total of 29 weeks on the chart. Additionally, the single opened at number 16 on the Euro Digital Songs on 26 April 2014. The following week, it reached its peak position at number 12.

In Sweden, "Stay High" debuted at number 49 on the Singles Top 100 chart for the issue dated 2 May 2014, and went on reaching position 13, with it spending a total of 70 weeks on the chart between 2014 and 2015. It was certified triple-Platinum by the Swedish Recording Industry Association (GLF), denoting 120,000 sales in that territory, and further became the eleventh best-selling track of 2014 in the country. It was also the fourth most-played song by Swedish radio station P3 in 2014. In Norway, "Stay High" debuted at number 15 on the Topp 40 Singles chart. In its fourth week, it reached number seven and claimed that position for five non-consecutive weeks. It spent a total of 27 weeks on the chart and became the seventh highest-selling single of 2014 in Norway. "Stay High" entered the Finnish Airplay Chart at number 91 on the nineteenth week of 2014, becoming Lo's second entry on the chart after "Out of Mind" (2013), which peaked at number 39 in 2013. It eventually reached the number 25 in its fifth week on the chart. "Stay High" peaked at number three in both the Flanders and Wallonia regions of Belgium, and was certified Gold by the Belgian Entertainment Association (BEA), for exceeding sales of 15,000 copies in the country. In Netherlands, "Stay High" topped the Dutch Top 40 chart for three consecutive weeks and peaked at number two on the Single Top 100 chart. According to the NVPI, it was the seventh best-selling single of 2014 in that territory.

In Australia, "Stay High" entered the ARIA Singles Chart at number 65 on the issue dated 12 May 2014. It peaked at number three, and was certified double-platinum by the Australian Recording Industry Association (ARIA), denoting sales of 140,000 in the region. In New Zealand, it debuted at number 40 on the New Zealand Singles Chart on 21 April 2014, and dropped off the chart the following week. However, it re-entered the chart at number 26 on 5 May 2014. The track eventually reached number three and spent a total of 29 weeks on the chart, being eventually certified seven-times Platinum by the Recorded Music NZ (RMNZ) for 210,000 copies sold in the country.

=== Promotion ===
In an interview with French website Pure Charts, the singer stated that she only performs the original version of "Habits (Stay High)" because she considers it "more proper" for live performances than the remix version. The music video for "Stay High" was directed by Motellet Film. The duo used the same footage of the second music video for "Habits (Stay High)" and applied slow motion in all the scenes. Pedro Kurtz of Brazilian website A Gambiarra stated that the effect was used to cause a "feeling of intoxication" which was "perfectly applied and aligned" to the scenes. Also, Michael Cragg of The Guardian said that "the woozy remix perfectly suits the permanently dazed, alcohol-fuelled feel of the slow motion video". The Guardian's website premiered the video on 4 April 2014, while the singer released it on her Vevo channel on YouTube the same day. On 11 April 2014, it was released on the iTunes Store. On 29 December 2022, the clip surpassed the one-billion views on YouTube.

=== Charts ===
==== Weekly charts ====
Weekly chart performance for Hippie Sabotage remix
Chart (2014–15)	Peak position
Australia (ARIA)	3
Belgium (Ultratop 50 Flanders)	3
Belgium (Ultratop 50 Wallonia)	3
Europe (Euro Digital Songs)	12
Finland (Official Finnish Airplay Chart)	25
France (SNEP)	2
Ireland (IRMA)	49
Netherlands (Dutch Top 40)	1
Netherlands (Single Top 100)	2
New Zealand (Recorded Music NZ)	3
Norway (VG-lista)	7
Scottish Singles Sales (Official Charts)	8
Sweden (Sverigetopplistan)	13
UK Singles (Official Charts)	6

==== Year-end charts ====
Annual chart rankings for Hippie Sabotage remix
Chart (2014)	Position
Australia (ARIA)	38
Belgium (Ultratop 50 Flanders)	19
Belgium (Ultratop 50 Wallonia)	12
Netherlands (Dutch Top 40)	14
Netherlands (Single Top 100)	7
New Zealand (Recorded Music NZ)	29
Norway (VG-lista)	7
Sweden (Sverigetopplistan)	11
UK Singles (Official Charts Company)	56
Chart (2015)	Position
Sweden (Sverigetopplistan)	89

=== Certifications ===
Certifications and sales
Region	Certification	Certified units/sales
Australia (ARIA)	2× Platinum	140,000^{^}
Belgium (BRMA)	Gold	15,000^{*}
New Zealand (RMNZ)	8× Platinum	240,000^{‡}
United Kingdom (BPI)	2× Platinum	1,200,000^{‡}
Streaming
Denmark (IFPI Danmark)	Platinum	2,600,000^{†}
^{*} Sales figures based on certification alone.^{^} Shipments figures based on certification alone.^{‡} Sales+streaming figures based on certification alone.^{†} Streaming-only figures based on certification alone.

== Cover versions and other remixes ==
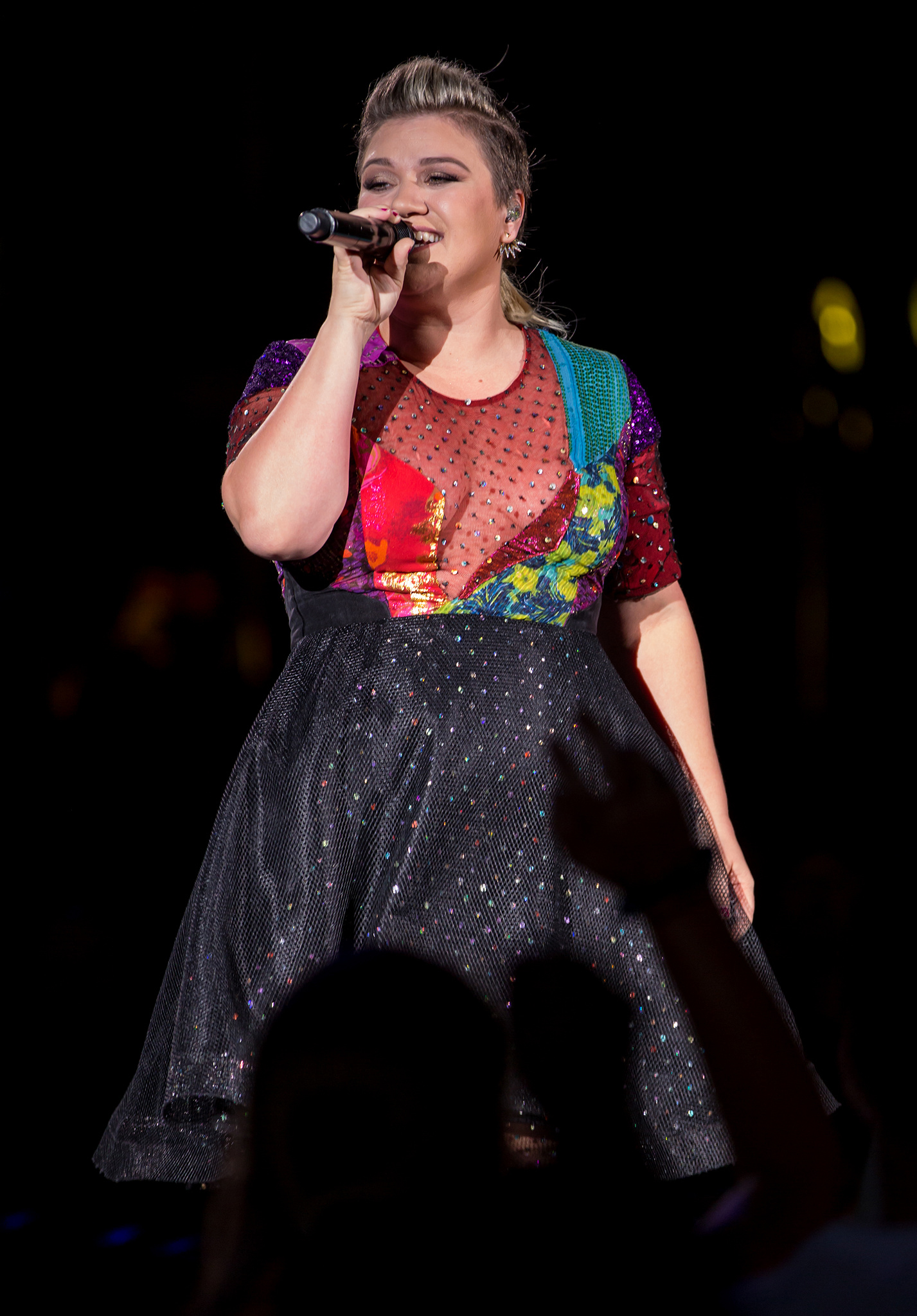
Kelly Clarkson covered "Habits (Stay High)" during her Piece by Piece Tour (2015).

On 14 October 2014, band Against the Current posted their cover version of "Habits (Stay High)" on YouTube and released it on the iTunes Store. Five days later, Alex Goot also premiered a cover version with Madilyn Bailey through the same platform. Diane Cho of VH1 gave the cover a positive review, in which she stated that Goot and Bailey voices "complement each other perfectly". In that same month, Camilla Daum covered the song on the fourth season of The Voice of Germany. In November 2014, post-hardcore band Our Last Night posted their cover of the track on their YouTube channel. Diane Cho of VH1 wrote that the band "gives 'Habits' that rock 'n roll edge that works really well for this song". Canadian rock band Theory of a Deadman released an acoustic cover version in April 2015, which was later included on their record Angel Acoustic EP (2015). In May 2015, Kygo performed a piano version with vocals by Parson James on BBC Radio 1's Live Lounge. In that same month, actor Vin Diesel posted a cover version of the song on his Facebook page as a tribute to his late friend Paul Walker; in the background of the performance images were projected of Diesel with Walker. Kelly Clarkson covered the song as part of her "Fan Requests" during her Piece by Piece Tour on 26 July 2015. Entertainment Tonight's John Boone ranked it at number one on his list of Kelly Clarkson's 11 Best Tour Covers, further adding that the singer sounded "amazing" and that he "loved" to hear her "darker and edgier side". "Habits (Stay High)" has been covered twice on The Voice: la plus belle voix, the first time by Madeleine Leaper during the fourth season in 2014, and by Amandine on the show's following season the next year.

In January 2014, American DJ duo the Chainsmokers remixed "Habits (Stay High)" and released it as a free digital download. Idolator's Sam Lansky felt that the producers transformed "the melodic original into something glitchy, twitchy and dark". On 17 June, a radio edit as well as an extended version of their remix were distributed on the iTunes Store. On 17 June, a remix version by Swedish DJ Oliver Nelson was released on the iTunes Store, and was later included on the re-issue of Truth Serum. On 9 December 2014, a remix version by American DJ duo FIXYN was made available for consumption through the same platform.

In June 2020, the song was covered in a performance by Louriza Tronco and Sarah Grey as their respective characters in an episode of the Netflix web series, The Order. The performance on the show led to "Habits (Stay High)" entering the Billboard Top TV Songs chart at number 4 in June 2020. In January 2021, the song was covered by South Korean singer, actress and Blackpink member Jisoo during the Blackpink Livestream Concert: The Show, in which she rewrote the verses with Korean lyrics. In 2023, a version titled "Stay High" by Diplo and Hugel featuring Julia Church on vocals was released which interpolates "Habits (Stay High)". It reached No. 36 on the US Billboard Dance/Electronic Songs chart.

== Formats and track listings ==
Digital download

1. "Habits (Stay High)" – 3:28

Digital download – Deluxe single

1. "Habits (Stay High)" – 3:29
2. "Habits (Stay High)" music video – 3:26

Digital download – Hippie Sabotage remix

1. "Stay High" – 4:18

== Credits and personnel ==
Credits were adapted from the liner notes of Queen of the Clouds.

=== Recording locations ===
- Recorded at Warner/Chappell Studios, Stockholm.
- Mixed at Ramtitam Studios, Stockholm.
- Mastered at Cutting Room, Stockholm.

=== Personnel ===
For "Habits (Stay High)":

- Lead vocals, background vocals – Tove Lo
- Songwriting – Tove Lo, Jakob Jerlström, Ludvig Söderberg
- Production – The Struts
- Mixing – Lars Norgren
- Programming – The Struts
- Mastering – Björn Engelmann
- Keys – The Struts
- Strings – Filip Runesson

For "Habits (Stay High)" – Hippie Sabotage remix:

- Songwriting – Tove Lo, Jakob Jerlström, Ludvig Söderberg
- Musical arrangement – Jeffery Saurer, Kevin Saurer
- Remix and additional production – Hippie Sabotage

== Release history ==
Region	Date	Version	Format	Distributor	Ref.
United States	15 March 2013	Original version	Digital download	Independent release	
Austria	6 December 2013	Original version	Digital download	Universal Music	
Norway	6 December 2013	Original version	Digital download	Universal Music	
Spain	6 December 2013	Original version	Digital download	Universal Music	
Germany	18 December 2013	Original version	Digital download	Island; Universal Music	
United States	14 January 2014	Original version	Digital download	Island; Universal Music	
Canada	14 January 2014	Original version	Digital download	Universal Music	
Germany	25 February 2014	Hippie Sabotage remix	Digital download	Island; Universal Music	
Norway	25 February 2014	Hippie Sabotage remix	Digital download	Universal Music	
United Kingdom	24 March 2014	Hippie Sabotage remix	Mainstream Radio	Polydor	
United States	14 April 2014	Original version	Adult album alternative	Island	
United States	13 May 2014	Original version	Modern rock	Island; Republic	
United States	17 June 2014	Original version	Contemporary hit radio	Island; Republic	
United States	17 June 2014	The Chainsmokers remix – Radio edit	Digital download	Universal Music	
United States	17 June 2014	The Chainsmokers remix – Extended mix	Digital download	Universal Music	
United States	17 June 2014	Oliver Nelson remix	Digital download	Universal Music	
United States	15 September 2014	Original version	Hot adult contemporary	Island; Republic	
Italy	10 October 2014	Original version	Mainstream Radio	Universal Music	
Austria	31 October 2014	Original version	Digital download	Universal Music	
Germany	2 January 2015	Original version	Digital download	Universal Music	
United States	9 December 2014	FIXYN remix	Digital download	Universal Music	
United States	4 September 2015	Original version – Deluxe single	Digital download	Universal Music	

== See also ==
- List of Billboard Hot 100 top 10 singles in 2014
- List of Billboard Mainstream Top 40 number-one songs of 2014
- List of Dutch Top 40 number-one singles of 2014
- List of Hot 100 Airplay number-one singles of the 2010s
- List of media portrayals of bisexuality
- List of number-one singles of 2014 (Poland)
