= Queen of the Clouds Tour =

2015 concert tour by Tove Lo

- Tour by Tove Lo
- Associated album: Queen of the Clouds
- Start date: September 28, 2015
- End date: November 15, 2015
- Legs: 2
- No. of shows: 16 in North America; 4 in Europe; 20 in total
- Guests: Erik Hassle

Tove Lo concert chronology
- Queen of the Clouds Tour (2015); Lady Wood Tour (2017)

The Queen of the Clouds Tour was the first headlining concert tour by Swedish singer Tove Lo in support of her debut studio album, Queen of the Clouds (2014). The tour was officially announced nine months after the release of the album, on June 22, 2015. The tour began on September 28, 2015, in San Diego at the North Park Theatre and was scheduled to conclude on November 14, 2015, in Tove Lo's home city of Stockholm, Sweden, with a total of twenty shows over the span of three months. Due to illness, Tove Lo was forced to cancel the tour's four European.

== Set list ==
This set list is representative of the show in Minneapolis on October 10, 2015. It does not represent all dates throughout the tour.

1. "Not on Drugs"
2. "Got Love"
3. "The Way That I Am"
4. "Moments"
5. "My Gun"
6. "Like Em Young"
7. "Over"
8. "Scream My Name"
9. "Thousand Miles"
10. "This Time Around"
11. "Out of Mind"
12. "Crave"
13. "Talking Body"
14. "Paradise"
15. "Timebomb"
16. "Run On Love"
17. "Habits (Stay High)"

== Shows ==
List of concerts, showing date, city, country, venue, opening acts, tickets sold, number of available tickets, and gross revenue
Date	City	Country	Venue	Opening acts	Attendance	Revenue
North America
September 28, 2015	San Diego	United States	North Park Theatre	Erik Hassle	—	—
September 29, 2015	Santa Ana	United States	The Observatory	Erik Hassle	—	—
October 1, 2015	Los Angeles	United States	The Wiltern	Erik Hassle	—	—
October 3, 2015	Oakland	United States	Fox Theatre	Erik Hassle	2,800 / 2,800	$78,400
October 5, 2015	Portland	United States	Crystal Ballroom	Erik Hassle	—	—
October 6, 2015	Vancouver	Canada	Vogue Theatre	Erik Hassle	—	—
October 7, 2015	Seattle	United States	Showbox SoDo	Erik Hassle	—	—
October 10, 2015	Minneapolis	United States	First Avenue	Erik Hassle	—	—
October 11, 2015	Chicago	United States	The Vic Theatre	Erik Hassle	1,400 / 1,400	$40,600
October 13, 2015	Toronto	Canada	Sound Academy	Erik Hassle	—	—
October 14, 2015	Boston	United States	Royale	Erik Hassle	—	—
October 16, 2015	Providence	United States	Lupo's Heartbreak Hotel	Erik Hassle	—	—
October 17, 2015	Philadelphia	United States	The TLA	Erik Hassle	—	—
October 19, 2015	Washington, D.C.	United States	9:30 Club	Erik Hassle	1,200 / 1,200	$36,000
October 20, 2015	Huntington	United States	The Paramount	Erik Hassle	—	—
October 21, 2015	New York City	United States	Terminal 5	Erik Hassle	—	—
Europe
November 9, 2015	Glasgow	Scotland	Queen Margaret Union	—	—	—
November 10, 2015	Manchester	England	Manchester Academy	—	—	—
November 12, 2015	London	England	Shepherd's Bush Empire	—	—	—
November 14, 2015	Stockholm	Sweden	Münchenbryggeriet	—	—	—
Total					5,400 / 5,400 (100%)	$122,600
