= Queen of the Clouds =

2014 studio album by Tove Lo

Studio album by Tove Lo
- Released: 24 September 2014
- Studios: Wolf Cousins (Stockholm); MXM (Stockholm); Apmamman (Stockholm); Warner/Chappell (Stockholm); The Tree House (Los Angeles); Kustom Deluxe (Nashville); The Barn (Stockholm); Farplane (Stockholm)
- Genre: Electropop
- Length: 51:17
- Label: Island
- Producers: Klas Åhlund; Captain Cuts; Mattman & Robin; Lucas Nord; Ali Payami; Scribz Riley; Kyle Shearer; Shellback; The Struts

Tove Lo chronology
Truth Serum (2014)	Queen of the Clouds (2014)	Lady Wood (2016)

Singles from Queen of the Clouds
- 1. "Habits (Stay High)" Released: 6 December 2013; 2. "Talking Body" Released: 13 January 2015; 3. "Timebomb" Released: 12 August 2015; 4. "Moments" Released: 27 October 2015

Queen of the Clouds is the debut studio album by Swedish singer Tove Lo, released on 24 September 2014 by Island Records. Recorded in numerous studios across Stockholm, Sweden and the United States, the album follows her first extended play, Truth Serum (2014). Lo worked with several writers and producers such as the Struts, Klas Åhlund, Alexander Kronlund, Alx Reuterskiöld, and Captain Cuts.

Queen of the Clouds is primarily an electropop record with the elements of dance-pop and synth-pop. Lyrically, the album's themes center on the stages of a relationship, including passion, love, and breaking up. Queen of the Clouds was supported by four singles, including "Habits (Stay High)", "Talking Body", "Timebomb" and "Moments". The album also includes "Not on Drugs" and the Hippie Sabotage remix of "Habits (Stay High)" from Truth Serum as well as the Lucas Nord collaboration, "Run on Love". It was promoted with television performances and through the Queen of the Clouds Tour.

Upon its release, Queen of the Clouds garnered generally positive reviews from music critics. It charted at number 14 on the Billboard 200 and peaked at number 6 on the Swedish Albums Chart, alongside certifying 3× Platinum in Brazil. On 25 September 2015, a year after the album's original release, a "blueprint" edition was announced; the bonus length features tracks from Truth Serum, a new version of "Moments", the originally Spotify-exclusive "Not Made for This World", and an explicit version of The Hunger Games: Mockingjay – Part 1's "Scream My Name". A reissue edition, titled as Queen of the Clouds: X, was released on 27 September 2024 as the album's tenth anniversary edition; it contains "Jealousy (From the Vault)", "Write Me Off") and a remix of "Talking Body".

== Background and development ==
Follow-up to Lo's debut extended play, Truth Serum (2014), Queen of the Clouds is a trilogy divided into three sections: "The Sex", "The Love" and "The Pain". She described her music as like a therapist, where she could sing about things she would not normally dare to speak about. The title for the album came from her song "Not on Drugs", and describes her new lifestyle touring the world after the success of her debut EP. Lo said that it represented the feeling of "floating on top of the world" and that it was important that the album title represented her.

== Composition ==
Queen of the Clouds blends multiple styles of music into a "monogenre" sound, containing heavy influences of EDM, hip hop, dance-pop, new wave, rock, and R&B, as it combines them into a "seamless compendium". Heavily influenced by electropop musical styles, the album is predominantly a concept album which divides the record into three sections: "The Sex", "The Love" and "The Pain". Similar to the theme of poisoned relationships explored on Truth Serum, the album centers on a breakup and provides a complete narration of her romantic struggles.

The first section, "The Sex", opens the record with four songs about the "lecherous and reckless" beginning of a relationship, and are composed in an "infectious and tongue-in-cheek stampede of uptempo pop". Album opener, "My Gun", has been described as an urban-influenced pop song textured with elements of dancehall. It begins with a "mournful"-sounding choir before building to an upbeat pop groove. Lo's vocals are low and seductive, before gliding into her higher range. The track explores the "flirty" stage before delving into more sexual themes, found later on "Talking Body", and has been compared to the works of Rihanna. Lyrically, Lo compares her lover to "her gun" and sings of feeling a release of pleasure: "Boy, if you're gonna shoot me down/Do it gently". The next track, "Like Em' Young", is driven by a tribal-influenced rhythm "coated" with a "parade" of dub-bass. Its lyrics are satirical in nature, as she criticises other women for judging her taste in younger men: "Hey girl, why you judging me/When your, your guy is turning 53?/ I don't know what really gets you more/Is it that my guy's gonna live out yours?" "Talking Body" is a heavily sexual song described as "salivating with carnal lust", and according to Ken Capobianco of The Boston Globe, evokes "the rush of early Madonna". Lyrically, the verses see Lo in a state of idée fixe towards her partner, as she finds herself revolving her life around him. The chorus is musically armed with heavy propulsion combined with rising, subdued synths and sees her "objectifying" his model physique. Rounding out the first section is "Timebomb", a frantic electronic dance piano ballad hybrid described as a "sonic bombardment" of "euphoric" chords, drums, and psychedelic synths, and features an "explosive" chorus containing crashing cymbals and pounding bass. Lo's vocals in the track are sung out of time to the beat, rushing her lyrics into a single phrase.

The second section, "The Love", has been described as "a thunderous yearning through gigantic mid tempo, electronic balladry". It opens with the "volcanic" ballad "Moments", which boasts atmospherics and influences of "trippy" samba. Lyrically, it sees Lo confessing her flaws before declaring "On good days, I am charming as fuck!". "The Way That I Am" is a dubstep song filled with "pain and passion" as Lo sings in a soulful rasp and lyrically cries out to her partner to love her as she is; including flaws. "Got Love" is one of the albums "pure" pop moments, and contains an unwaveringly positive attitude. Lyrically, she rejoices exultant feelings of first falling in love as she sings "Good enough to make the ocean look like it's a pond/Good enough to turn the valleys into mountain tops", and discusses the theme of immortality "We live like legends now, know that would never die/Oh, we Got Love". Closing out the section is the power pop song "Not on Drugs". Primarily a guitar-driven song that explores the topic of a feeling of love so bewildering and overpowering that it affects your behavior, as if you were on drugs.

The final section is "The Pain" which explores the difficulty piecing together one's life after the destruction and demise of a relationship through "distraught" lyricism and melancholic pop. The section opens with the "thunderous" electropop power-ballad "Thousand Miles", which lyrically depicts Lo's obsession with reuniting with her lost love at all costs, even if it means running "a thousand miles". Musically, the mid-tempo track tells a story of a girl "struggling to forget a rocky relationship with an ex", and is sonically amped up by the singer's "emotionally distraught" vocals and "thundering" drum rhythms. The following song, "Habits (Stay High)" sees her emotionally unravel even more, as she talks about self-medicating by smoking marijuana to cope to live without her lover. It's "snappy" verses are filled with "quietly distinct, often strange imagery", including Lo eating her dinner in the bathtub, getting drunken munchies, and seducing dads on the playground. Musically, it is a Purity Ring-inspired song, and creates a calming atmosphere compared to that of morphine. "This Time Around" is a dark Charli XCX-inspired track which reflects on the lessons learned from a heartbreak. Lo's vocal performance on the song has been described as particularly yearning and broken. The final song of the section and album is "Run on Love", an "easy-going" reworked nu-disco dance collaboration with EDM producer Lucas Nord. Lyrically, Lo sings of picking up her heart and choosing to no longer be a victim by living in the moment enjoy time with her lover before it runs out.

== Release and promotion ==
Lo announced the release of Queen of the Clouds in an interview with Rolling Stone on 19 August 2014. Shortly after, on 9 September, the album was made available to pre-order online through the iTunes Store. On 16 September, the album tracks such as "Moments", "Timebomb" and "Thousand Miles" were also made available to download alongside the iTunes pre-order. On 24 September, Lo performed "Habits" on Jimmy Kimmel Live! to promote her album. The album was also supported by the Queen of the Clouds Tour which was conducted between September and November 2015.

On 27 September 2024, the reissue of Queen of the Clouds, subtitled X, was released to commemorate the album's tenth anniversary. It includes two new songs ("Jealousy" and "Write Me Off") and a new remix of "Talking Body". The track "Jealousy", officially titled as "Jealousy (From the Vault)", was mostly anticipated song among her fans in 2014.

=== Singles ===
The lead single, "Habits (Stay High)", was originally released as "Habits" on 25 March 2013 prior to the release of Truth Serum in March 2014. It was later re-released as "Habits (Stay High)" on 6 December 2013. It peaked at number three on the US Billboard Hot 100 in 2014. A remix of the song by record production duo Hippie Sabotage, alternatively titled "Stay High", was released on 25 February 2014. It peaked at number 13 on the Swedish Singles Chart, while it peaked within the top 10 of the charts in Norway, the Netherlands, the United Kingdom, New Zealand and Australia. "Not on Drugs" was originally revealed as the album's second single with its lyric video of the premiering in June 2014 and its music video premiering in August of the same year, but a different single, "Talking Body", impacted pop radio on 13 January 2015. It has since peaked at number 12 on the Hot 100 as of 20 May 2015.

On 23 May 2015, at the Boston Calling Music Festival, Lo announced that "Timebomb" would serve as the third single. It was digitally released on 12 August 2015. However, Republic Records, which handled Lo's American radio promotions, made "Moments" impact pop radio instead of "Timebomb" on 13 October 2015; "Moments" became the fourth single from the album.

== Critical reception ==
Professional ratings
Aggregate scores
Source	Rating
Metacritic	73/100
Review scores
Source	Rating
AllMusic	3.5/5 stars
Cuepoint (Expert Witness)	(3-star Honorable Mention)
The Daily Telegraph	3/5 stars
Digital Spy	3/5 stars
Evening Standard	4/5 stars
The Guardian	4/5 stars
The Irish Times	4/5 stars
The Observer	4/5 stars
Pitchfork	7.2/10
Rolling Stone	3.5/5 stars

Upon release, Queen of the Clouds received positive reviews from music critics. According to Metacritic, the album received an average score of 73/100 based on 4 reviews.

Sam Lansky from Time praised the lyrical content of the album, stating that "the tracks all have a satisfying stomp and crash, but it's her lyrics that shine brightest, trading in pop clichés but flipping them in the same breath." He described the hooks of the tracks as commercial enough to give Lo a "fighting chance at stateside stardom". Carrie Battan from Pitchfork gave the album a 7.2 out of 10 and described her music as "bruised, brightly arranged pop songs that feel grand but not excessive". She also noted that her "disarming honesty" and "well-phrased lyrics" are what sticks to the brain. Kathy Iandoli from Idolator gave the album 3.5 out of 5 and praised the honesty of the lyrics and noted that Lo "has become masterfully adept at jamming thoughtful words into dancey songs through her past songwriting, but she takes it a step further with Queen of the Clouds".

== Commercial performance ==
=== Sweden ===
In Lo's native Sweden, Queen of the Clouds debuted at number six on the Sverigetopplistan charts, remaining in the top 100 for 79 weeks. The album was also certified Platinum by Grammofon Leverantörernas Förening (GLF) for equivalent sales of 40,000 units in the country. By the end of 2014, the album was positioned at number 72 on the Sverigetopplistan chart. By the end of 2015, the album was positioned at number 13 on the chart, and by the end of 2016, it was positioned at number 90.

=== Other countries ===
In the United States, the album entered the Billboard 200 at number 14 with first-week sales of 19,000 copies, and would eventually be certified Platinum by the Recording Industry Association of America (RIAA) for equivalent sales of 1,000,000 units. By the end of 2015, the album was positioned at number 49 on the Billboard 200. As of August 2016, it had sold 190,000 copies in the US. The album debuted at number 17 on the UK Albums Chart, selling 4,722 copies in its first week. The album also peaked within the top 50 in Australia, Finland, New Zealand and Norway.

== Track listing ==
Queen of the Clouds track listing
No.	Title	Writer(s)	Producer(s)	Length
1.	"The Sex"			0:06
2.	"My Gun"	Tove Lo; Daniel Ledinsky; Jakob Jerlström; Ludvig Söderberg	The Struts; Ledinsky^{[a]}	3:36
3.	"Like Em Young"	Lo; Jerlström; Söderberg	The Struts	3:39
4.	"Talking Body"	Lo; Jerlström; Söderberg	The Struts; Shellback	3:58
5.	"Timebomb"	Lo; Klas Åhlund; Alex Kronlund	Åhlund	3:34
6.	"The Love"			0:05
7.	"Moments"	Lo	Mattman & Robin	3:22
8.	"The Way That I Am"	Lo; Ali Payami	Payami	3:07
9.	"Got Love"	Lo; Alx Reuterskiöld; Jerlström; Söderberg	The Struts	3:48
10.	"Not on Drugs"	Lo; Reuterskiöld; Söderberg; Jerlström	The Struts; Reuterskiöld^{[b]}	3:02
11.	"The Pain"			0:05
12.	"Thousand Miles"	Lo; Mike "Scribz" Riley	Scribz Riley; The Struts	3:34
13.	"Habits (Stay High)"	Lo; Söderberg; Jerlström	The Struts	3:29
14.	"This Time Around"	Lo; Nate Campany; Kyle Shearer	Shearer	4:04
15.	"Run on Love" (Lucas Nord featuring Tove Lo) (QOTC edit)	Lucas Nordqvist; Lo	Nord	4:00
16.	"Love Ballad"	Lo; Jerlström; Söderberg	The Struts	3:30
17.	"Habits (Stay High)" (Hippie Sabotage remix)	Lo; Söderberg; Jerlström	The Struts; Hippie Sabotage^{[a]}^{[c]}	4:18
Total length:				51:17

Blueprint Edition bonus tracks
No.	Title	Writer(s)	Producer(s)	Length
17.	"Paradise"	Lo; Riley; Wilkins	The Struts; Scribz^{[b]}	3:03
18.	"Over"	Lo; Larsson; Fredriksson; Gill	The Struts; Mattman & Robin^{[b]}; Gill^{[b]}	3:44
19.	"Out of Mind"	Lo; Reuterskiöld	The Struts	3:09
20.	"Crave"	Lo; Ryan Rabin; Ben Berger; Ryan McMahon	Captain Cuts	3:28
21.	"Not Made for This World"	Lo; Jimson; Flygare	Astma & Rocwell	3:38
22.	"Scream My Name"	Lo	Lo; Söderberg^{[a]}; Peter Carlsson^{[d]}	3:34
23.	"Habits (Stay High)" (Hippie Sabotage remix)	Lo; Söderberg; Jerlström	The Struts; Hippie Sabotage^{[a]}^{[c]}	4:18
24.	"Heroes (We Could Be)" (Alesso featuring Tove Lo)	Alessandro Lindblad; Lo; David Bowie; Brian Eno	Lindblad	3:29
Total length:				75:22

Queen of the Clouds: X track listing
No.	Title	Writer(s)	Producer(s)	Length
1.	"The X"			0:08
2.	"Jealousy" (From the Vault)	Lo; Larsson; Fredriksson; Gill	Mattman & Robin	3:45
3.	"Write Me Off" (Super Demo.mp4a)	Lo	Lo	3:35
4.	"Talking Body" (2014 Jax Jones remix)	Lo; Jerlström; Söderberg	The Struts; Shellback; Jones^{[c]}	4:38
5.	"The Sex"			0:06
6.	"My Gun"	Lo; Ledinsky; Jerlström; Söderberg	The Struts; Ledinsky^{[a]}	3:36
7.	"Like Em Young"	Lo; Jerlström; Söderberg	The Struts	3:39
8.	"Talking Body"	Lo; Jerlström; Söderberg	The Struts; Shellback	3:58
9.	"Timebomb"	Lo; Åhlund; Kronlund	Åhlund	3:34
10.	"The Love"			0:05
11.	"Moments"	Lo	Mattman & Robin	3:22
12.	"The Way That I Am"	Lo; Payami	Payami	3:07
13.	"Got Love"	Lo; Reuterskiöld; Jerlström; Söderberg	The Struts	3:48
14.	"Not on Drugs"	Lo; Reuterskiöld; Söderberg; Jerlström	The Struts; Reuterskiöld^{[b]}	3:02
15.	"The Pain"			0:05
16.	"Thousand Miles"	Lo; Riley	Scribz; The Struts	3:34
17.	"Habits (Stay High)"	Lo; Söderberg; Jerlström	The Struts	3:29
18.	"This Time Around"	Lo; Campany; Shearer	Shearer	4:04
19.	"Run on Love" (Lucas Nord featuring Tove Lo) (QOTC edit)	Nordqvist; Lo	Nord	4:00
20.	"Habits (Stay High)" (Hippie Sabotage remix)	Lo; Söderberg; Jerlström	The Struts; Hippie Sabotage^{[a]}^{[c]}	4:18
21.	"Love Ballad"	Lo; Jerlström; Söderberg	The Struts	3:30
22.	"Paradise"	Lo; Riley; Wilkins	The Struts; Scribz^{[b]}	3:03
23.	"Over"	Lo; Larsson; Fredriksson; Gill	The Struts; Mattman & Robin^{[b]}; Gill^{[b]}	3:44
24.	"Out of Mind"	Lo; Reuterskiöld	The Struts	3:09
25.	"Heroes (We Could Be)" (Alesso featuring Tove Lo)	Lindblad; Lo; Bowie; Eno	Alesso	3:29
26.	"Crave"	Lo; Rabin; Berger; McMahon	Captain Cuts	3:30
27.	"Not Made for This World"	Lo; Jimson; Flygare	Astma & Rocwell	3:38
28.	"Not on Drugs" (Ali Payami remix)	Lo; Reuterskiöld; Söderberg; Jerlström	The Struts; Reuterskiöld^{[b]}; Payami^{[c]}	2:51
Total length:				87:14

=== Notes ===
- ^{^[a]} signifies an additional producer.
- ^{^[b]} signifies a co-producer.
- ^{^[c]} signifies a remixer.
- ^{^[d]} signifies an additional vocal producer.
- North American standard edition doesn't include "Love Ballad".
- North American Blueprint Edition mirrors the track order of Queen of the Clouds: X after track 4; "Not Made for This World" only included on the Spotify version of the reissue.

== Credits and personnel ==
Credits were adapted from the liner notes of the international standard edition.

=== Recording locations ===
- Wolf Cousins; Stockholm (2–4, 7–9)
- MXM; Stockholm (4)
- Apmamman; Stockholm (5)
- Warner/Chappell; Stockholm (10, 12, 13, 17)
- The Tree House; Los Angeles (14)
- Kustom Deluxe; Nashville (14)
- The Barn; Stockholm (15)
- Farplane; Stockholm (15)

=== Musicians ===
- Tove Lo – vocals (2–5, 7–10, 12–16); backing vocals (2)
- The Struts – keyboards, guitars (2, 10); bass (2); programming (2, 3, 9, 10, 12, 13); all instruments (3, 9, 12); all keyboards (13)
- Daniel Ledinsky – strings, backing vocals (2)
- Shellback – additional programming, keyboards (4)
- Klas Åhlund – instruments, programming (5)
- David Nyström – piano (5)
- Mattman & Robin – all instruments, programming (7)
- Ali Payami – all instruments, programming (8)
- Filip Runesson – strings (9, 13)
- Alx Reuterskiöld – keyboards (10)
- Scribz Riley – all instruments, programming (12)
- Kyle Shearer – all instruments (14)
- Jeffrey Saurer – musical arrangement (16)
- Kevin Saurer – musical arrangement (16)

=== Technical ===
- The Struts – production (2, 3, 9, 10, 12, 13); engineering (2)
- Daniel Ledinsky – additional production (2)
- Spyke Lee – engineering assistance (2)
- Lars Norgren – mixing (2, 3, 7–10, 12–14)
- Shellback – production (4)
- Serban Ghenea – mixing (4)
- John Hanes – engineering for mix (4)
- Klas Åhlund – production (5)
- Michael Illbert – mixing (5)
- Mattman & Robin – production (7)
- Ali Payami – production (8)
- Alx Reuterskiöld – co-production (10)
- Scribz Riley – production (12)
- Kyle Shearer – production (14)
- Robert Marvin – additional engineering (14)
- Andy Selby – vocal editing (14)
- Lucas Nord – production, mixing (15)
- Hippie Sabotage – remix, additional production (16)
- Björn Engelmann – mastering

=== Artwork ===
- Daniel Åberg – art direction, design, cover design
- Johannes Helje – cover design, photography, photo editing
- Clara Tägtström – cover design
- Tove Lo – cover design, hand lettering titles
- Oskar Wettergren – hand lettering front and chapters

== Charts ==
=== Weekly charts ===
List of weekly chart positions
Chart (2014–2015)	Peak position
Australian Albums (ARIA)	47
Austrian Albums (Ö3 Austria)	47
Belgian Albums (Ultratop Flanders)	65
Belgian Albums (Ultratop Wallonia)	43
Canadian Albums (Billboard)	17
Danish Albums (Hitlisten)	16
Finnish Albums (Suomen virallinen lista)	33
French Albums (SNEP)	72
German Albums (Offizielle Top 100)	49
Irish Albums (IRMA)	43
New Zealand Albums (RMNZ)	22
Norwegian Albums (VG-lista)	10
Scottish Albums (Official Charts)	18
Swedish Albums (Sverigetopplistan)	6
UK Albums (Official Charts)	17
US Billboard 200	14

=== Year-end charts ===
List of year-end chart positions
Chart (2014)	Position
Swedish Albums (Sverigetopplistan)	72
Chart (2015)	Position
Danish Albums (Hitlisten)	36
Swedish Albums (Sverigetopplistan)	13
US Billboard 200	49
Chart (2016)	Position
Swedish Albums (Sverigetopplistan)	90

== Certifications ==
List of certifications
Region	Certification	Certified units/sales
Brazil (Pro-Música Brasil) 10th anniversary reissue	3× Platinum	120,000^{‡}
Denmark (IFPI Danmark)	Platinum	20,000^{‡}
Mexico (AMPROFON)	Gold	30,000^{^}
New Zealand (RMNZ)	Platinum	15,000^{‡}
Poland (ZPAV)	Platinum	20,000^{‡}
Singapore (RIAS)	Gold	5,000^{*}
Sweden (GLF)	Platinum	40,000^{‡}
United Kingdom (BPI)	Gold	100,000^{‡}
United States (RIAA)	Platinum	1,000,000^{‡}
^{*} Sales figures based on certification alone.^{^} Shipments figures based on certification alone.^{‡} Sales+streaming figures based on certification alone.

== Release history ==
List of release dates and formats
Region	Date	Format	Edition	Label	Ref.
Australia	24 September 2014	CD; digital download; streaming	Standard; deluxe	Universal	
Norway	24 September 2014	CD; digital download; streaming	Standard; deluxe	Universal	
Sweden	24 September 2014	CD; digital download; streaming	Standard; deluxe	Universal	
Canada	30 September 2014	CD; digital download; streaming	Standard; deluxe	Universal	
United States	30 September 2014	CD; digital download; streaming	Standard; deluxe	Island	
Italy	11 November 2014	CD; digital download; streaming	Standard; deluxe	Universal	
United Kingdom	11 May 2015	CD; digital download; streaming	Standard; deluxe	Polydor	
United Kingdom	25 September 2015	CD	Blueprint	Polydor	
Canada	2 October 2015	CD; digital download; streaming	Blueprint	Universal	
United States	2 October 2015	CD; digital download; streaming	Blueprint	Island	
Australia	30 October 2015	CD; digital download; streaming	Blueprint	Universal	
Sweden	30 October 2015	CD; digital download; streaming	Blueprint	Universal	
United Kingdom	30 October 2015	CD; digital download; streaming	Blueprint	Polydor	
