= By:Larm =

Annual music festival held in Norway

by:Larm
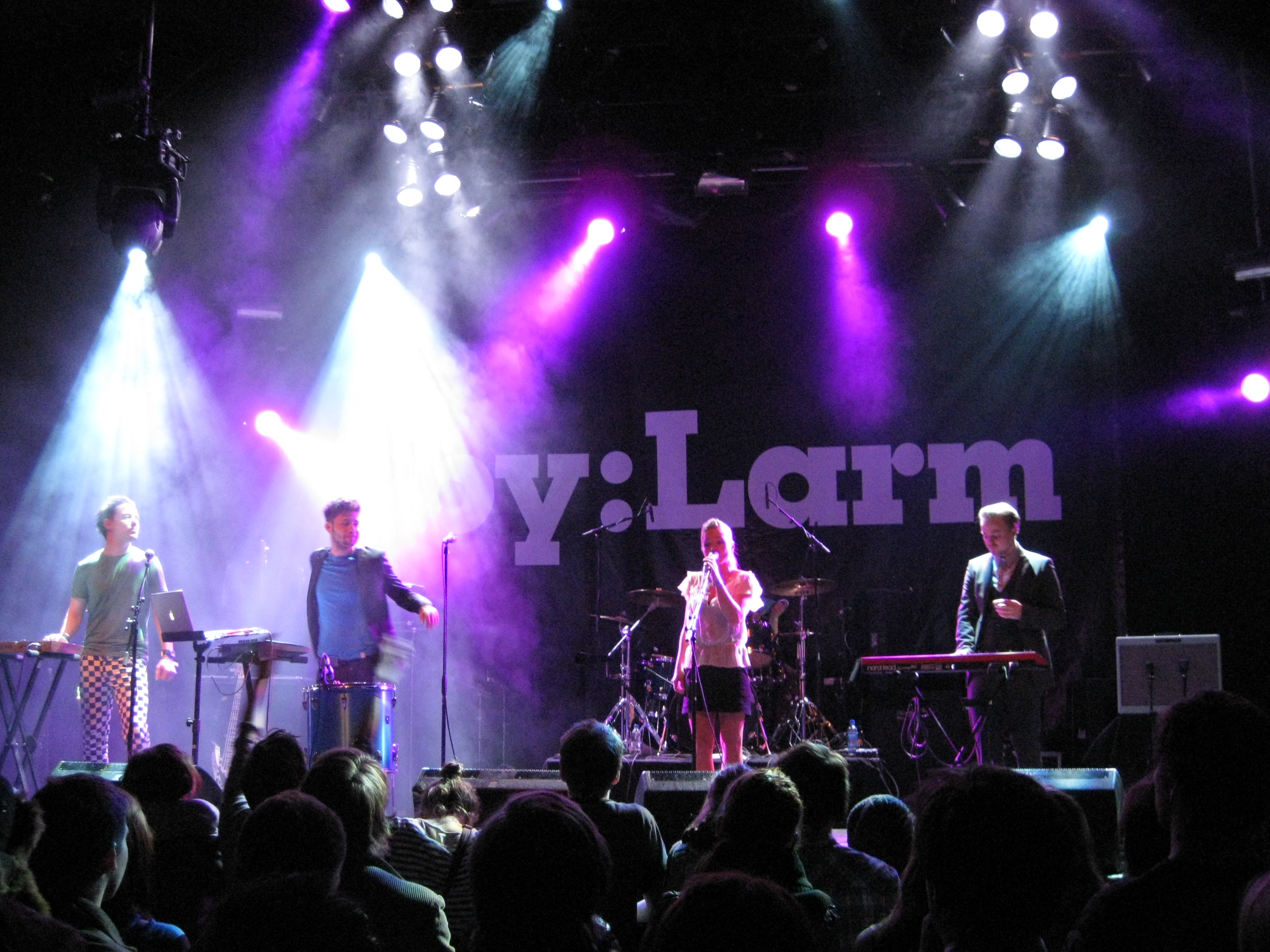
- Pink Robots performing at by:Larm in 2010
- Genre: Any
- Dates: 27–29 February 2020
- Locations: Oslo, Norway
- Years active: 1998–present
- Website: www.bylarm.no

by:Larm is a music festival and conference located in Oslo, Norway. It was first held in 1998, and, for the first ten years of its existence, moved between different Norwegian cities, before permanently settling in Oslo in 2008.

by:Larm was formed as a way for the Nordic music business to get together for both conferences and a concert programme consisting of new music from the Nordic countries, often on the verge of success. Since the start in 1998 the festival has gradually increased in prominence and size, and as of 2019 gathers 5000 festival guests alongside 3000 delegates from the Nordic and international music industry, making it the most important meeting place for the Nordic music business and biggest festival of its kind in Scandinavia.

== 2020 ==
The 23rd edition of by:Larm was held during 27–29 February 2020, once more in Oslo. In 2021, the festival was postponed until the autumn and will be held during 30 September through 2 October in Oslo. The festival also announced that its move to the autumn will be permanent.
