= Notting Hill Arts Club =

London music and arts venue

- Notting Hill Arts Club in 2008
- Interactive map of Notting Hill Arts Club
- Address: Notting Hill Gate; London, W11; United Kingdom
- Coordinates: 51°30′33″N 0°11′40″W
- Capacity: 218
- Public transit: Notting Hill Gate

Construction
- Opened: 1997; 29 years ago

Website
- Official website

The Notting Hill Arts Club is a music and arts venue on Notting Hill Gate in the Royal Borough of Kensington and Chelsea. It has a capacity of 218.

The venue holds club nights every night of the week. Its range of events include interactive crafts, themed Soviet nights, and a Death Disco club night run by Creation Records founder Alan McGee. Former guest DJs have included Courtney Love and Mick Jones. The Guardian described the venue as "a haven for indie celebs and punk veterans".

The venue turned into a coffee stall in September 2020 during the COVID-19 pandemic to generate income whilst it was closed.

== See also ==
- List of London venues
