= Tove Lo discography =

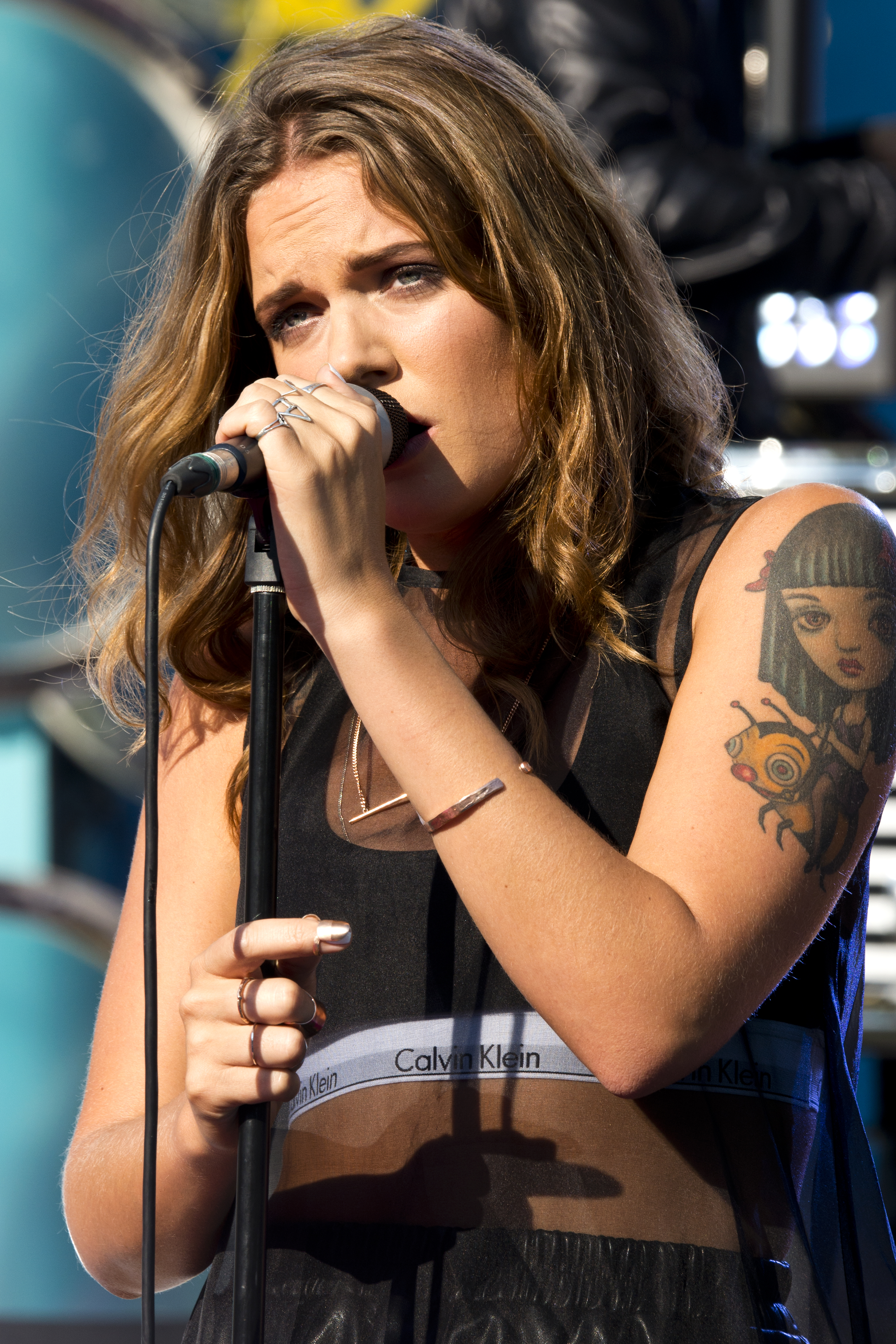
- Lo performing in 2014
- Studio albums: 6
- EPs: 3
- Singles: 33
- Music videos: 39
- Promotional singles: 7

Swedish singer and songwriter Tove Lo has released six studio albums, three extended plays (EP), 33 singles (including 14 as a featured artist), seven promotional singles and 37 music videos. Lo started her career as the lead singer and songwriter in math rock band Tremblebee from 2006 until 2009. In 2011, she signed a publishing deal with Warner/Chappell Music, and started recording songs. She self-released "Love Ballad" as her debut single in October 2012. The next year, Lo released "Habits", which received positive feedback from music blogs and led her to sign a record deal with Universal Music Group. Lo's first EP, Truth Serum, was released under the label on 3 March 2014, and entered the top 20 in Norway and Sweden. Three singles were released from the EP, including a remixed version of "Habits" by production duo Hippie Sabotage, retitled "Stay High". (Note: A remixed version of "Habits (Stay High)" by DJ duo Hippie Sabotage, retitled "Stay High" was issued as the EP's third single. Promotion for "Habits (Stay High)" continued as it was selected as the lead single from Queen of the Clouds.) The track peaked at number 13 in Sweden and reached the top ten of the charts in Australia, New Zealand, and the United Kingdom.

Lo's debut album, Queen of the Clouds, was released on 30 September 2014 in the United States, to generally positive reviews. It peaked at number six in Sweden and number 14 on the US Billboard 200, and received platinum certifications in both countries. "Habits" was re-issued as "Habits (Stay High)" and released as the lead single from the record. (Note: Tove Lo initially self-released the song under the title "Habits" on 25 March 2013 as her second single. After she was signed to Universal Music, the track was re-released on 6 December 2013 under the new title of "Habits (Stay High)", as the second single from Truth Serum.) A sleeper hit in the United States, it peaked at number three on the Billboard Hot 100, and received a quintuple platinum certification by the Recording Industry Association of America (RIAA). In doing so, it became the highest-charting song by a Swedish act on the Billboard Hot 100 since "The Sign" by Ace of Base peaked at number one in 1994. Lo later collaborated with Swedish DJ Alesso in the song "Heroes (We Could Be)" in 2014, which became her highest-charting single in Sweden, peaking at number 5.

In early 2016, Lo appeared as a featured artist on "Close" by American singer Nick Jonas, and "Say It" by Australian DJ Flume. On 28 October of that year, the singer released her second studio album, Lady Wood, which topped the albums chart in Sweden and peaked at number 11 on the US Billboard 200. Its lead single, "Cool Girl", entered the top 30 in Australia, New Zealand and Sweden. On 17 November 2017, Lo released her third studio album, Blue Lips, which peaked at number 15 in Sweden and charted in Canada, Netherlands, Norway, and the United States. On 20 September 2019, Lo released her fourth studio album, "Sunshine Kitty". The album's lead single, "Glad He's Gone", was nominated for the Best Music Video Award at the 62nd Grammy Awards.

== Albums ==
=== Studio albums ===
List of studio albums, with selected chart positions and certifications
Title	Details	Peak chart positions										Sales	Certifications
Title	Details	SWE	AUS	BEL (FL)	CAN	FIN	IRE	NOR	SCO	UK	US	Sales	Certifications
Queen of the Clouds	Released: 24 September 2014; Label: Island; Formats: CD, LP, digital download	6	47	65	17	33	43	10	18	17	14	US: 190,000	GLF: Platinum; BPI: Gold; RIAA: Platinum; RMNZ: Platinum
Lady Wood	Released: 28 October 2016; Label: Island; Formats: CD, LP, digital download	1	21	45	14	20	32	7	64	40	11		RMNZ: Gold
Blue Lips	Released: 17 November 2017; Label: Island; Format: Digital download	15	—	—	78	—	—	39	—	— (Note: Blue Lips did not enter the UK Albums Chart, but peaked at number seventy one on the UK Album Downloads Chart.)	138		
Sunshine Kitty	Released: 20 September 2019; Label: Island; Format: CD, LP, digital download	19	54	75	49	20	57	22	90	59	61		
Dirt Femme	Released: 14 October 2022; Label: Pretty Swede, mtheory; Format: CD, LP, digital download	11	—	86	—	34	95	11	—	— (Note: Dirt Femme did not enter the UK Albums Chart but peaked at number nine on the UK Album Downloads Chart.)	153		
Estrus	Released: 18 September 2026; Label: Pretty Swede, mtheory; Format: CD, LP, digital download, streaming	13	32	107	—	—	—	—	13	63	184		
"—" denotes a recording that did not chart or was not released in that territory.

=== Reissues ===
List of reissue albums with details
Title	Details
Queen of the Clouds: Blueprint Edition	Released: 30 October 2015; Label: Universal Music; Format: CD, LP, digital download
Sunshine Kitty (Paw Prints Edition)	Released: 22 May 2020; Label: Island; Format: Digital download, streaming
Dirt Femme (Extended Cut)	Released: 11 August 2023; Label: Pretty Swede, mtheory; Format: Digital download, streaming
Queen of the Clouds: X	Released: 27 September 2024; Label: Universal Music; Format: Digital download, streaming, LP

=== Compilations ===
List of compilation albums with details
Title	Details
Lady Wood / Blue Lips	Released: 17 December 2018; Label: Universal Music, Polydor; Format: 2×LP

== Extended plays ==
List of extended plays, with selected chart positions
Title	Details	Peak chart positions				
Title	Details	SWE	AUS	FIN	NOR	US Dance
Truth Serum	Released: 3 March 2014; Label: Universal; Formats: CD, LP, digital download	13	99	30	8	—
Dirt Femme (Stripped)	Released: 5 May 2023; Label: Pretty Swede; Formats: Digital download, streaming	—	—	—	—	—
Heat (with SG Lewis)	Released: 14 June 2024; Label: Pretty Swede; Formats: LP, digital download, streaming	—	—	—	—	15

== Singles ==
=== As lead artist ===
List of singles as lead artist, with selected chart positions and certifications, showing year released and album name
Title	Year	Peak chart positions										Certifications	Album
Title	Year	SWE	AUS	BEL (FL)	CAN	DEN	GER	NLD	NZ	UK	US	Certifications	Album
"Love Ballad"	2012	—	—	—	—	—	—	—	—	—	—		Truth Serum (Swedish version)
"Habits"	2013	—	—	—	—	—	—	—	—	—	—		Truth Serum
"Out of Mind"	2013	—	—	—	—	—	—	—	—	—	—		Truth Serum
"Habits (Stay High)"	2013	—	—	—	3	3	14	—	—	— (Note: "Habits (Stay High)" did not enter the UK Singles Chart, but peaked at number 80 on the UK Singles Downloads Chart.)	3	BPI: Platinum; BVMI: 3× Gold; IFPI DEN: 2× Platinum; MC: 2× Platinum; RIAA: 8× Platinum	Queen of the Clouds
"Stay High" (featuring Hippie Sabotage)	2013	13	3	3	—	—	—	2	3	6	—	GLF: 3× Platinum; ARIA: 2× Platinum; BPI: 2× Platinum; BRMA: Gold; IFPI DEN: Gold; RMNZ: 8× Platinum	Truth Serum
"Not on Drugs"	2014	—	—	—	—	—	—	—	—	—	—		Truth Serum
"Talking Body"	2015	16	83	— (Note: "Talking Body" did not enter the Ultratop 50, but peaked at number 19 on the Flemish Ultratip chart.)	14	26	57	74	—	17	12	BPI: Platinum; BVMI: Gold; IFPI DEN: 2× Platinum; RIAA: 5× Platinum; RMNZ: 3× Platinum	Queen of the Clouds
"Timebomb"	2015	— (Note: "Timebomb" did not enter the Swedish Singles Chart, but peaked at number four on the Swedish Heatseeker chart.)	—	—	—	—	—	—	—	—	—		Queen of the Clouds
"Moments"	2015	—	—	—	—	—	—	—	—	—	—		Queen of the Clouds
"Scars"	2016	—	—	—	—	—	—	—	—	—	—		Allegiant
"Cool Girl"	2016	15	30	— (Note: "Cool Girl" did not enter the Ultratop 50, but peaked at number 7 on the Flemish Ultratip chart.)	42	26	43	44	15	46	84	GLF: Platinum; ARIA: Gold; BPI: Silver; BVMI: Gold; IFPI DEN: Platinum; RIAA: Platinum; RMNZ: Platinum	Lady Wood
"True Disaster"	2016	56	—	—	—	—	—	—	—	— (Note: Despite never making the full-week top-100 UK Singles Chart, "True Disaster" was number 93 on its midweek equivalent, Singles Chart Update. It was also number 53 on the full-week UK Singles Sales Chart, which removes streaming from the equation.)	— (Note: Although failing to enter the main Billboard Hot 100, "True Disaster" spent a week at number 50 on its download component chart, Digital Song Sales.)		Lady Wood
"Disco Tits"	2017	55	—	—	—	—	—	—	— (Note: "Disco Tits" did not enter the NZ Top 40 Singles Chart, but peaked at number six on the NZ Heatseekers Singles Chart.)	— (Note: Despite never making the full-week top-100 UK Singles Chart, "Disco Tits" was number 92 on its midweek equivalent, Singles Chart Update. It was also number 90 on the full-week UK Singles Sales Chart, which removes streaming from the equation.)	—		Blue Lips
"Bitches" (featuring Alma, Charli XCX, Elliphant, and Icona Pop)	2018	—	—	—	—	—	—	—	—	—	—		Blue Lips
"Glad He's Gone"	2019	38	—	—	—	—	—	—	— (Note: "Glad He's Gone" did not enter the NZ Top 40 Singles Chart, but peaked at number 19 on the NZ Hot Singles Chart.)	—	—		Sunshine Kitty
"Bad as the Boys" (featuring Alma)	2019	— (Note: "Bad as the Boys" did not enter the Swedish Singellista Chart, but peaked at number nine on the Swedish Heatseeker Chart.)	—	—	—	—	—	—	— (Note: "Bad as the Boys" did not enter the NZ Top 40 Singles Chart, but peaked at number 14 on the NZ Hot Singles Chart.)	—	—		Sunshine Kitty
"Jacques" (with Jax Jones)	2019	61	—	—	—	—	—	—	—	67	—		Sunshine Kitty
"Really Don't Like U" (featuring Kylie Minogue)	2019	—	—	—	—	—	—	—	— (Note: "Really Don't Like U" did not enter the NZ Top 40 Singles Chart, but peaked at number 37 on the NZ Hot Singles Chart.)	— (Note: "Really Don't Like U" did not make the top-100 main streaming-and-sales UK Singles Chart, but landed at number 74 on the UK Singles Sales Chart.)	—		Sunshine Kitty
"Sweettalk My Heart"	2019	48	—	—	—	—	—	—	— (Note: "Sweettalk My Heart" did not enter the NZ Top 40 Singles Chart, but peaked at number 21 on the NZ Hot Singles Chart.)	—	—		Sunshine Kitty
"Bikini Porn"	2020	76	—	—	—	—	—	—	— (Note: "Bikini Porn" did not enter the NZ Top 40 Singles Chart, but peaked at number 35 on the NZ Hot Singles Chart.)	—	—		Sunshine Kitty: Paw Prints Edition
"Calling on Me" (with Sean Paul)	2020	97	—	—	—	—	—	—	—	—	—		Scorcha
"I'm Coming" (recorded at the Spotify Studios)	2020	12	—	—	—	—	—	—	— (Note: "I'm Coming" did not enter the NZ Top 40 Singles Chart, but peaked at number 30 on the NZ Hot Singles Chart.)	—	—		Sunshine Kitty: Paw Prints Edition
"Sadder Badder Cooler"	2020	— (Note: "Sadder Badder Cooler" did not enter the Swedish Singles Chart, but peaked at number 15 on the Swedish Heatseeker Chart.)	—	—	—	—	—	—	—	—	—		Sunshine Kitty: Paw Prints Edition
"How Long"	2022	92	—	—	—	—	—	—	—	—	—		Euphoria Season 2
"No One Dies from Love"	2022	26	—	—	—	—	—	—	— (Note: "No One Dies from Love" did not enter the NZ Top 40 Singles Chart, but peaked at number 36 on the NZ Hot Singles Chart.)	—	—		Dirt Femme
"2 Die 4"	2022	19	—	—	—	—	—	—	—	—	—		Dirt Femme
"Grapefruit"	2022	33	—	—	—	—	—	—	— (Note: "Grapefruit" did not enter the NZ Top 40 Singles Chart, but peaked at number 22 on the NZ Hot Singles Chart.)	—	—		Dirt Femme
"Borderline"	2023	73	—	—	—	—	—	—	— (Note: "Borderline" did not enter the NZ Top 40 Singles Chart, but peaked at number 31 on the NZ Hot Singles Chart.)	—	—		Dirt Femme (Extended Cut)
"I Like U"	2023	— (Note: "I Like U" did not enter the Swedish Singellista Chart, but peaked at number seven on the Swedish Heatseeker Chart.)	—	—	—	—	—	—	—	—	—		Dirt Femme (Extended Cut)
"Elevator Eyes"	2023	— (Note: "Elevator Eyes" did not enter the Swedish Singellista Chart, but peaked at number 13 on the Swedish Heatseeker Chart.)	—	—	—	—	—	—	— (Note: "Elevator Eyes" did not enter the NZ Top 40 Singles Chart, but peaked at number 32 on the NZ Hot Singles Chart.)	—	—		Dirt Femme (Extended Cut)
"Love Bites" (with Nelly Furtado and SG Lewis)	2024	—	—	—	— (Note: "Love Bites" did not enter the Canadian Top 100 Singles Chart but peaked at number 36 on the Canada CHR/Top 40.)	—	— (Note: "Love Bites" did not enter the German Singles Chart, but peaked at number 66 on the German Singles Downloads Chart.)	—	—	— (Note: "Love Bites" did not enter the UK Singles Chart Top 100, but peaked at number 9 on the UK Physical Singles Chart and at number 6 on the UK Vinyl Singles Chart.)	— (Note: "Love Bites" did not enter the US Billboard Hot 100 Chart, but peaked at number 2 on the Billboard Dance/Mix Show Airplay Chart, and at number 21 on the Dance/Electronic Songs Chart.)		7
"Heat" (with SG Lewis)	2024	86	—	—	—	—	—	—	— (Note: "Heat" did not enter the NZ Top 40 Singles Chart, but peaked at number 20 on the NZ Hot Singles Chart.)	— (Note: "Heat" did not chart on the UK Singles Chart but did peak at 43 on the Singles Sales Chart)	—		Heat
"My Oh My" (with Kylie Minogue and Bebe Rexha)	2024	—	—	—	—	—	—	—	— (Note: "My Oh My" did not enter the NZ Top 40 Singles Chart, but peaked at number 21 on the NZ Hot Singles Chart.)	63	—		Tension II
"Cave" (with Dom Dolla)	2024	—	—	—	—	—	—	—	— (Note: "Cave" did not enter the NZ Top 40 Singles Chart, but peaked at number nine on the NZ Hot Singles Chart.)	—	—	ARIA: Gold	Non-album single
"I'm Your Girl Right?"	2026	—	—	—	—	—	—	—	— (Note: "I'm Your Girl Right?" did not enter the NZ Top 40 Singles Chart, but peaked at number 36 on the NZ Hot Singles Chart.)	—	—		Estrus
"Des fleurs" (with Stromae)	2026	—	—	47	—	—	—	—	— (Note: "Des fleurs" did not enter the NZ Top 40 Singles Chart, but peaked at number 29 on the NZ Hot Singles Chart.)	—	—	BRMA: Gold	Estrus
"DNH"	2026	—	—	—	—	—	—	—	—	—	—		Estrus
"Blood in Your Eyes"	2026	65	—	—	—	—	—	—	— (Note: "Blood in Your Eyes" did not enter the NZ Top 40 Singles Chart, but peaked at number 5 on the NZ Hot Singles Chart.)	66	—		Grand Theft Auto VI: The Album
"—" denotes a recording that did not chart or was not released in that territory.

=== As featured artist ===
List of singles as featured artist, with selected chart positions and certifications, showing year released and album name
Title	Year	Peak chart positions										Certifications	Album
Title	Year	SWE	AUS	BEL (FL)	CAN	DEN	GER	NLD	NZ	UK	US	Certifications	Album
"Run on Love" (Lucas Nord featuring Tove Lo)	2013	—	—	—	—	—	—	—	—	—	—		Islands
"Strangers" (Seven Lions with Myon & Shane 54 featuring Tove Lo)	2013	—	—	—	—	—	—	—	—	—	—	RIAA: Gold	Worlds Apart
"Heroes (We Could Be)" (Alesso featuring Tove Lo)	2014	5	11	28	51	26	71	18	15	6	31	GLF: 4× Platinum; ARIA: Platinum; BPI: 2× Platinum; BVMI: Gold; IFPI DEN: Platinum; MC: Gold; RIAA: 2× Platinum; RMNZ: 2× Platinum	Forever
"Come Back to Me" (Urban Cone featuring Tove Lo)	2015	—	—	—	—	—	—	—	—	—	—		Polaroid Memories
"Desire" (Years & Years featuring Tove Lo)	2016	78	—	22	—	—	—	—	—	27	—	RMNZ: Platinum	Communion
"Close" (Nick Jonas featuring Tove Lo)	2016	41	37	33	12	34	61	57	11	25	14	GLF: Platinum; BPI: Gold; BRMA: Gold; IFPI DEN: Platinum; RIAA: 3× Platinum; RMNZ: 2× Platinum	Last Year Was Complicated
"Say It" (Flume featuring Tove Lo)	2016	—	5	36	61	—	—	—	4	69	60	ARIA: 4× Platinum; BPI: Gold; MC: Gold; RIAA: Gold; RMNZ: 5× Platinum	Skin
"Out of My Head" (Charli XCX featuring Tove Lo and Alma)	2017	—	—	—	—	—	—	—	— (Note: "Out of My Head" did not enter the NZ Top 40 Singles Chart, but peaked at number six on the NZ Heatseeker Singles Chart.)	—	—		Pop 2
"Colorblind" (Karma Fields featuring Tove Lo)	2018	—	—	—	—	—	—	—	—	—	—		Body Rush
"Blow That Smoke" (Major Lazer featuring Tove Lo)	2018	71	—	—	—	—	—	—	— (Note: "Blow That Smoke" did not enter the NZ Top 40 Singles Chart, but peaked at number 25 on the NZ Hot Singles Chart.)	—	—		Major Lazer Essentials
"Heart Attack" (Phoebe Ryan featuring Tove Lo)	2018	—	—	—	—	—	—	—	—	—	—		NGX: Ten Years of Neon Gold
"Win Win" (Diplo featuring Tove Lo)	2019	—	—	—	—	—	—	—	—	—	—		Higher Ground
"Diva" (Aazar featuring Swae Lee and Tove Lo)	2019	— (Note: "Diva" did not enter the Swedish Singellista Chart, but peaked at number 17 on the Swedish Heatseeker Chart.)	—	—	—	—	—	—	—	—	—		Non-album singles
"Don't Say Goodbye" (Alok and Ilkay Sencan featuring Tove Lo)	2020	—	—	—	—	—	—	—	—	—	—		Non-album singles
"Pressure" (Martin Garrix featuring Tove Lo)	2021	39	—	— (Note: "Pressure" did not enter the Ultratop 50, but peaked at number 16 on the Flemish Ultratip chart.)	—	—	—	55	— (Note: "Pressure" did not enter the NZ Top 40 Singles Chart, but peaked at number seven on the NZ Hot Singles Chart.)	—	—		Non-album singles
"Give It All Up" (Duran Duran featuring Tove Lo)	2021	—	—	—	—	—	—	—	—	—	—		Future Past
"Venus Fly Trap" (Kito Remix) (Marina featuring Tove Lo and Kito)	2021	—	—	—	—	—	—	—	—	—	—		Non-album single
"I Keep" (Broods featuring Tove Lo)	2022	—	—	—	—	—	—	—	— (Note: "I Keep" did not enter the NZ Top 40 Singles Chart, but peaked at number 14 on the NZ Hot Singles Chart.)	—	—		Space Island
"—" denotes a recording that did not chart or was not released in that territory.

=== Promotional singles ===
List of promotional singles, with selected chart positions, showing year released and album name
Title	Year	Peak positions					Album
Title	Year	SWE	IRE	NZ Hot	UK	UK Sales	Album
"Thousand Miles"	2014	—	—	—	—	—	Queen of the Clouds
"Got Love"	2014	—	—	—	—	—	Queen of the Clouds
"Influence" (featuring Wiz Khalifa)	2016	78	—	— (Note: "Influence" did not enter the NZ Top 40 Singles Chart, and the NZ Hot Singles Chart did not exist at the time, but peaked at number 5 on the NZ Heatseeker Singles Chart.)	—	80	Lady Wood
"Vibes" (Tigertown Remix; featuring Joe Janiak)	2017	—	—	—	—	—	Non-album promotional single
"Are U Gonna Tell Her?" (Heavy Baile Remix; featuring MC Zaac)	2020	—	—	—	—	—	Sunshine Kitty: Paw Prints Edition
"Mateo" (For Nest Audio Sessions)	2020	—	—	—	—	—	Non-album promotional single
"True Romance"	2022	—	—	—	—	—	Dirt Femme
"I'm to Blame"	2022	—	—	—	—	—	Dirt Femme
"Call On Me" (with SG Lewis)	2022	—	—	—	—	—	Dirt Femme & AudioLust & HigherLove
"—" denotes a recording that did not chart in that territory.

== Other charted songs ==
List of other charted songs, with selected chart positions, showing year released and album name
Title	Year	Peaks					Album
Title	Year	SWE Heat.	FRA	NLD	NZ Heat.	US Dance	Album
"Fun" (Coldplay featuring Tove Lo)	2015	10	118	86	—	—	A Head Full of Dreams
"Freak of Nature" (Broods featuring Tove Lo)	2016	—	—	—	5	—	Conscious
"Lies in the Dark"	2017	6	147	—	—	—	Fifty Shades Darker
"Cycles"	2017	7	—	—	—	—	Blue Lips
"Pineapple Slice" (with SG Lewis)	2022	—	—	—	—	48	Dirt Femme
"Source of Life"	2026	6	—	—	—	—	Estrus
"—" denotes a recording that did not chart in that territory.

== Guest appearances ==
List of non-single guest appearances, with other performing artists, showing year released and album name
Title	Year	Other artist(s)	Album
"You Have to Let Me Go"	2012	Sonic Station	Sonic Station
"Scream My Name"	2014	None	The Hunger Games: Mockingjay, Part 1
"Rumors"	2015	Adam Lambert	The Original High
"Fun"	2015	Coldplay	A Head Full of Dreams
"Freak of Nature"	2016	Broods	Conscious
"Lies in the Dark"	2017	None	Fifty Shades Darker
"Worst Behaviour"	2020	Alma	Have U Seen Her?
"Buz Buz Hop Hop"	2020	None	At Home with The Kids
"I Keep"	2022	Broods	Space Island

== Music videos ==
List of music videos, showing year released and directors
Title	Year	Type	Director(s)	Ref.
As lead artist
"Love Ballad"	2012	Official	Motellet	
"Habits"	2013	Official	Motellet	
"Out of Mind"	2013	Official	Andreas Öhman	
"Habits (Stay High)"	2014	Official	Motellet	
"Stay High"	2014	Official	Motellet	
"Not on Drugs"	2014	Official	Rikkard Häggbom	
"Over"	2014	Official	John Rankin Waddell	
"Talking Body"	2015	Lyric	Unknown	
"Talking Body"	2015	Official	Andreas Weman and Johan Lydén	
"Timebomb"	2015	Official	Emil Nava	
"Timebomb"	2015	Lyric	Unknown	
"Moments"	2015	Official	Tim Erem	
"Cool Girl"	2016	Official	Tim Erem	
Fairy Dust	2016	Short film	Tim Erem	
"True Disaster"	2016	Official	Tim Erem	
Fire Fade	2017	Short film	Tim Erem	
"Disco Tits"	2017	Official	Tim Erem	
"Bitches" (featuring Charli XCX, Icona Pop, Elliphant and Alma)	2018	Official	Lucia Aniello	
Blue Lips	2018	Short film	Malia James	
"Cycles"	2018	Official	Malia James	
"Glad He's Gone"	2019	Official	Vania Heymann and Gal Muggia	
"Bad as the Boys" (featuring Alma)	2019	Lyric	Garrett Guidera, Natalia Kallio, Anna Miettinen, Charlie Twaddle and Natalie Ziering	
"Jacques" (with Jax Jones)	2019	Official	Glassface	
"Really Don't Like U" (featuring Kylie Minogue)	2019	Lyric	Natalie O'Moore and Thomas English	
"Sweettalk My Heart"	2019	Official	Bradley & Pablo	
"Sweettalk My Heart"	2019	Lyric	Garrett Guidera, Moni Haworth and Natalie Ziering	
"Are U Gonna Tell Her?" (featuring MC Zaac)	2019	Lyric	Natalie O'Moore and João Salvatore	
"Are U Gonna Tell Her?" (featuring MC Zaac)	2020	Official	Alaska	
"Equally Lost"	2020	Lyric	Garrett Guidera	
"Sadder Badder Cooler"	2020	Official	Venturia Animation Studios	
"Anywhere U Go"	2020	Live	Natalie O'Moore, Garrett Guidera, Jay Sprogell, Luke Orlando, Alice Plati Additional	
"Mateo"	2020	Lyric	Natalie O'Moore and Garrett Guidera	
"Bikini Porn"	2020	Official	Moni Haworth	
"I'm Coming"	2020	Lyric	Thibaut Duverneix	
"How Long"	2022	Official	KENTEN	
"No One Dies From Love"	2022	Official	Alaska	
"True Romance"	2022	Official	Kenny Laubbacher	
"2 Die 4"	2022	Official	Anna-Lisa Himma	
"Grapefruit"	2022	Official	Lisette Donkersloot	
Dirt Femme (Scene 1-12)	2022	Short film	Kenny Laubbacher, Moni Haworth	
"Borderline"	2023	Official	Nogari	
Borderline (Scene 13)	2023	Short film	Romina Rodríguez	
I Like U (Scene 14)	2023	Short film	Moni Haworth	
"I Like U"	2023	Official	Ayaka Ohira	
Elevator Eyes (Scene 15)	2023	Short film	Moni Haworth	
"My Oh My" (with Kylie Minogue and Bebe Rexha)	2024	Official	Charlie Di Placido	
"Heat"	2024	Official	David Wilson	
"Let Me Go Oh Oh"	2024	Official	Fa & Fon	
"Busy Girl"	2024	Official	David Wilson	
"Desire"	2024	Official	David Wilson	
Club Heat Edit	2024	Short Film	David Wilson, Fa & Fon	
"Cave" (with Dom Dolla)	2024	Lyric	Shevin Dissanayake	
"I'm Your Girl Right?"	2026	Official	Nogari	
"Des Fleurs" (with Stromae)	2026	Official	Charlie Denis	
As featured artist
"Run on Love" (with Lucas Nord)	2013	Official	Motellet	
"Heroes (We Could Be)" (with Alesso)	2014	Official	Emil Nava	
"Close" (with Nick Jonas)	2016	Official	Tim Erem	
"Blow That Smoke" (with Major Lazer)	2018	Official	DAD	
"Diva" (with Aazar, Swae Lee)	2019	Official	Original Kids	
"Calling On Me" (with Sean Paul)	2020	Official	Andy Hines	
"Don't Say Goodbye" (with Alok and Ilkay Sencan)	2020	Lyric	Garrett Guidera	

== Footnotes ==
Notes for albums and songs

Notes for peak chart positions
