= Bikini Porn =

2020 single by Tove Lo

Single by Tove Lo

from the album Sunshine Kitty (Paw Prints Edition)
- B-side: "Passion and Pain Taste the Same When I'm Weak"
- Released: 15 January 2020
- Genre: Pop
- Length: 2:42
- Label: Universal Music AB
- Songwriters: Tove Lo; Finneas; Jakob Hazell; Ludvig Söderberg; Svante Halldin
- Producers: Finneas; A Strut; Jack & Coke

Tove Lo singles chronology
"Sweettalk My Heart" (2019)	"Bikini Porn" (2020)	"Calling on Me" (2020)

Music video
- "Bikini Porn" on YouTube

"Bikini Porn" is a song recorded by Swedish singer Tove Lo, who co-wrote it with Finneas, Jakob Hazell, Ludvig Söderberg and Svante Halldin. It was produced by Finneas, Jack & Coke and A Strut, who also handled the programming. Universal Music AB released "Bikini Porn" as a single on 15 January 2020 for download and on streaming services, and later included it on Lo's reissue album Sunshine Kitty: Paw Prints Edition, in May 2020. The single also featured the ballad "Passion and Pain Taste the Same When I'm Weak", written by Lo and Finneas.

"Bikini Porn" is a pop song that is orchestrated by tropical instruments. According to Lo, the track's title refers to tan lines and its lyrics are about letting go of one's worries. It received positive reviews from music critics, who complimented its sexual lyrics and upbeat composition. "Bikini Porn" peaked at number 79 in Sweden and number 35 on the Hot 40 Singles Chart in New Zealand.

Moni Haworth directed the music video for "Bikini Porn" in Hesperia and Victorville, California, which was released on 17 January 2020. Edited in a lo-fi and VHS style, it depicts Lo wearing different bikinis while dancing in several locations, such as a desert, a gym and the back of a trailer. Some critics praised the plot of the clip for matching with the lyrics of the song, and others deemed Finneas' cameo as an Uber driver to be a highlight. Lo performed "Bikini Porn" during her Sunshine Kitty Tour in 2020.

== Background ==
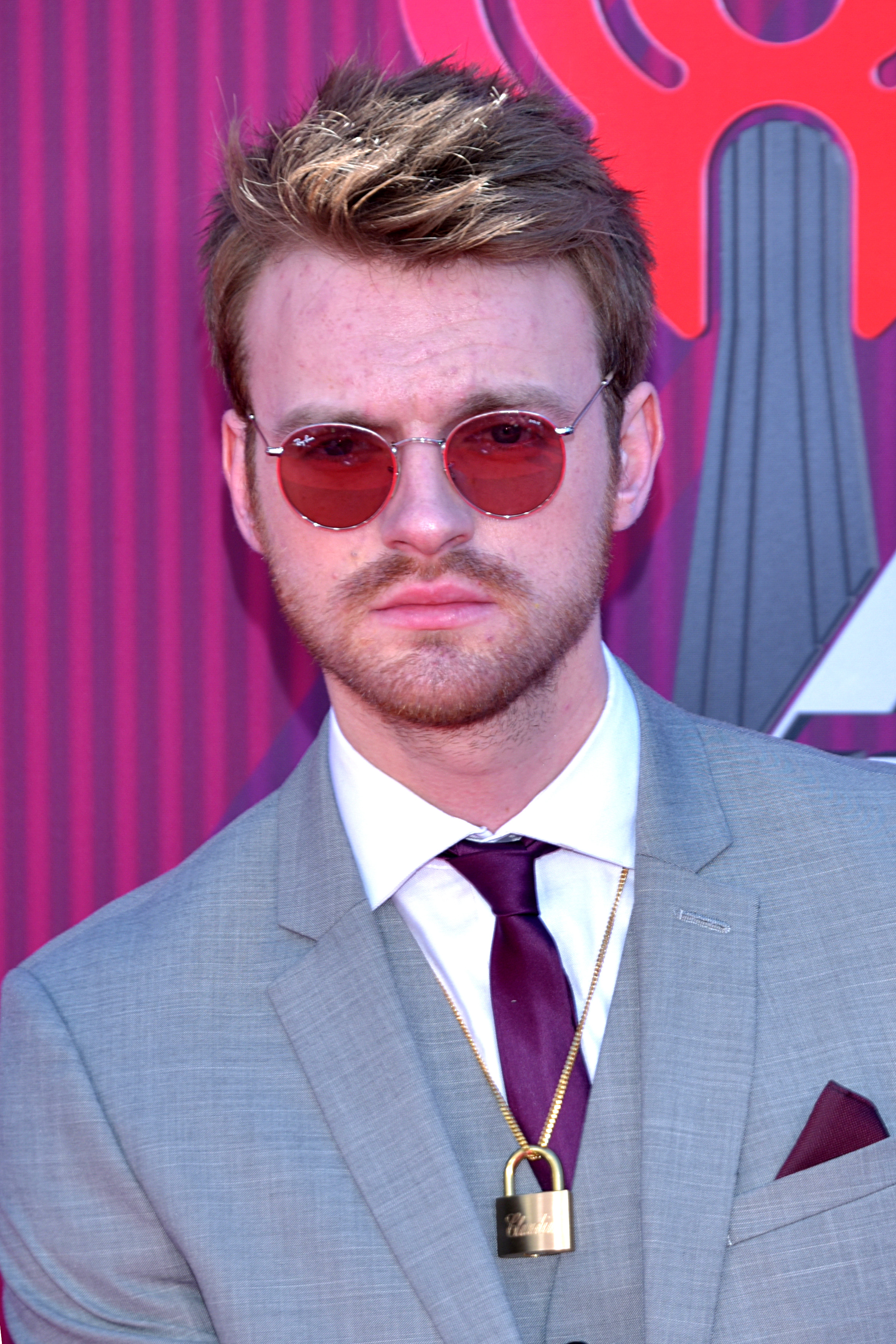
Finneas contributed to "Bikini Porn" as a co-writer and producer

Tove Lo wrote "Bikini Porn" while drinking champagne and being in what she described as a "happy place". The composition was initially poorly received by Lo's team, who told her "I think you're kind of imagining that it's something [better than it is]." She then contacted American musician Finneas through a songwriting collective the two were members of and asked him to produce the track. He agreed, saying "This is awesome, let me do my thing". Lo believed Finneas added the necessary quality and "grit and weirdness" to the song. She also commented on the experience of working with different people than her usual team of producers, saying, "it challenges you and brings out new sides of you, writing-wise."

On an Instagram post, Finneas said he became a fan of Lo after hearing her song "Habits (Stay High)" in 2014 and that "Bikini Porn" was "exactly" the track he dreamed about producing for her. In a June 2019 interview with Billboard, Lo stated she had written songs with Finneas, praising his ability as a producer and writer. She told NME in October of that year, "We're fans of each others' music and he's a really good lyricist so it felt like a fresher, freer session".

"Bikini Porn" was written by Lo, Finneas, Ludvig Söderberg, Jakob Hazell and Svante Halldin. Its production and programming was done by Finneas, Jack & Coke and A Strut. Serban Ghenea mixed it with the assistance of John Hanes while Chris Gehringer mastered it. Finneas produced the vocals, and played the synthesizer and percussion instruments.

== Music and lyrics ==
"Bikini Porn" is an uptempo pop song that is two minutes and forty-two seconds long. Its instrumentation incorporates a highly processed tropical beat and backing vocals that were modulated with a vocoder. Lo said the song's title is a reference to "tan lines", adding that it is about "living in the sun" and the "weird" lifestyle in Los Angeles that she considers to be "so dark and so fun". She also described "Bikini Porn" as "a sexy and weird song about letting go of your worries" in which she also makes fun of herself.

Derrick Rossignol of Uproxx said Lo was singing about "her success and enjoying a warm day", as demonstrated in the lyrics "All I do is drink champagne all day, all day, all day/ And I dance around my room naked, oh yeah, naked". Regarding the same verse, Billboard's Stephen Daw said that Lo is "feeling herself" both literally and figuratively, and encourages her lover to follow her.

== Release and live performances ==
Finneas told Radio.com in November 2019 his collaboration with Lo would be released in early 2020. On 24 December, Lo posted the lyrics of an unreleased song to her Instagram account using the hashtag "bikiniporn". Cerys Kenneally of The Line of Best Fit speculated the hashtag was the title of the new single. On 15 January 2020, four months after releasing her fourth studio album Sunshine Kitty, Lo premiered the single "Bikini Porn". It became available for download and on streaming services, via Universal Music AB. Lo performed "Bikini Porn" for the first time during the opening show of the Sunshine Kitty Tour in Nashville, Tennessee, on 3 February 2020, as the last song of the set list. She sang the track alongside "Habits (Stay High)" and "Sweettalk My Heart" (2019) during the encore on subsequent shows.

=== "Passion and Pain Taste the Same When I'm Weak" ===
The single features an additional song, "Passion and Pain Taste the Same When I'm Weak", written by Lo and Finneas. He also programmed, engineered and produced the track. It is an ambient ballad that is four minutes long, with a melody composed of background noise and percussions. Lo described it as a "beautiful, kind of" and "more poetic ballad" than "Bikini Porn". She told Nylon that she observed a "really close" connection between passion and hate within a fervent relationship, explaining, "Sometimes when you're in something very passionate, you kind of lose sight of– it usually comes with a lot of drama and fighting... all of a sudden, [that] turns into more pain than it does love". She stated she liked writing with Finneas because he encouraged her to be more vulnerable. In the verse "If you break my bones, I'mma hurt my soul, gonna fuck it out again and again", Lo describes a dark phase in her relationship, according to Billboard's Stephen Daw and Rose Riddell of Coup de Main Magazine.

According to Lo, "Bikini Porn" and "Passion and Pain Taste the Same When I'm Weak" were released together to represent two sides of "the extreme emotions of life". She stated the tracks show she can be sexual and confident but also smart and poetic in her music. Some authors, such as Stephen Daw of Billboard and Coup de Main Magazine's Rose Riddell noted the difference in composition between "Bikini Porn" and "Passion and Pain Taste the Same When I'm Weak". Patrick Clarke of NME said the tracks present two different sides of Lo's music, noting "Bikini Porn" was "upbeat and joyous" while "Passion and Pain Taste the Same When I'm Weak" had a darker theme. Similarly, Rossignol considered "Passion And Pain Taste The Same When I'm Weak" to be "slower and more somber in tone" than "Bikini Porn". Mike Wass of Idolator said the tracks reflect Finneas' minimal and alternative sound. Both songs were later included on Lo's reissue album Sunshine Kitty: Paw Prints Edition, released on 22 May 2020.

== Reception ==
Some critics praised "Bikini Porn"'s sexual lyrics and its upbeat composition. Deeming its title as charismatic, Jordi Bardají of Jenesaispop called "Bikini Porn" a "dancey, fun track". Writing for the same website, Raúl Guillén commended its uptempo melody and said the song could have been part of Sunshine Kitty, adding that Finneas' contribution is stylistically similar to his previous work. Idolator's Mike Wass found the chorus of the song quirky as well as "short and sweet and very, very catchy". He also said the track, despite being a departure from the singer's synth-pop style, still featured the sexual themes that are common in her music. Wass later named it the best song of the first quarter of 2020. Jem Aswad of Variety deemed "Bikini Porn" a "bouncy", "driving dancefloor track" and said it was not similar to Finneas' previous works. Salvatore Maicki of The Fader stated the lyrics feel "fit for an unseasonably warm January, a tousled paean to living skimpier".

Some reviewers considered "Bikini Porn" a candidate to be the song of the summer of 2020, such as Madeline Roth of MTV News, who also praised the track's upbeat composition. Echoing this thought, Claire Shaffer of Rolling Stone said "Bikini Porn" was a "very early contender for song of the Summer" and commended its hedonist theme. Other reviewers stated the song had an empowering message. Michael Love Michael of Paper said "Bikini Porn" is a "sexy, empowered track" with tongue-in-cheek lyrics about Lo herself. Similarly, Rose Riddel of Coup de Main Magazine described it as an empowering song with an upbeat melody.

In Sweden, "Bikini Porn" debuted at number 76 on the Veckolista Singlar chart for the week of 24 January 2020. In New Zealand, "Bikini Porn" debuted at number 35 on the Hot 40 Singles Chart, an extension of the main Top 40 Singles chart, during the week of 27 January 2020.

== Music video ==
The music video for "Bikini Porn", which was edited in a lo-fi and VHS style, depicts Lo wearing different bikinis while dancing in different locations

The music video for "Bikini Porn" was directed by Moni Haworth and filmed in Hesperia and Victorville, California with a crew of seven people. Lo said the video was fun and bizarre to shoot, describing the clip as sexual and funny although not every scene is "meant to be flattering". Finneas makes a cameo appearance as an Uber driver. On 17 January 2020, Lo released the clip on digital platforms and wrote a post on Instagram saying, "Anyone shocked it's basically me running around in a bikini? Didn't think so."

The music video, which was captured in a lo-fi and VHS style, depicts Lo wearing different bikinis while dancing in locations such as a desert, a gym and the back of a trailer. In one scene, she takes off her top and enters a pool, paralleling the lyric "Skinny dippin' in the pool with me". She then starts dancing in a record shop while the employees watch and eventually eject her. In the video's last scene, she dances in the back seat of an Uber car that is being driven by Finneas, who seems uncomfortable with her presence. Lo said about the video, "[It's] me in my own world, just living my life without caring what people think".

According to Carolyn Droke of Uproxx, the clip "complements the track's upbeat energy" and looks "like a home video". Rolling Stone's Claire Shaffer considered its concept "bizarre" and Jordi Bardají of Jenesaispop noted the singer was "completely unleashed" while showing her sensuality everywhere she visits in the video. Madeline Roth of MTV News wrote the music video's highlight is the scene in which Lo dances in the back seat of a car Finneas is driving. Deepa Lakshmin of Nylon said the clip is a "sharp contrast" to the one for "Glad He's Gone", the lead single from Lo's album Sunshine Kitty, which was more expensive to produce. Lakshmin also complimented Finneas' cameo, saying it is a "fantastic bonus".

== Track listing ==
Digital download

1. "Bikini Porn" – 2:42
2. "Passion and Pain Taste the Same When I'm Weak" – 4:00

Record Store Day 10" vinyl

1. "Bikini Porn" – 2:42
2. "Passion and Pain Taste the Same When I'm Weak" – 4:00

== Credits and personnel ==
Credits adapted from Tidal.

"Bikini Porn"

- Tove Lo – lead vocals, background vocals, songwriting
- Finneas – songwriting, production, programming, vocal production, synthesizer, percussion instruments
- Ludvig Söderberg – songwriting
- Jakob Hazell – songwriting
- Svante Halldin – songwriting
- Jack & Coke – production, programming
- A Strut – production, programming
- Serban Ghenea – mixing
- John Hanes – mixing assistant
- Chris Gehringer – mastering

"Passion and Pain Taste the Same When I'm Weak"

- Tove Lo – lead vocals, background vocals, songwriting
- Finneas – songwriting, production, programming, audio engineering, vocal production, synthesizer, percussion instruments
- Serban Ghenea – mixing
- John Hanes – mixing assistant
- Chris Gehringer – mastering

== Charts ==
Chart (2020)	Peak position
New Zealand Hot Singles (RMNZ)	35
Sweden (Sverigetopplistan)	76

== Release history ==
Region	Date	Format	Label	Ref.
Sweden	15 January 2020	Digital download; streaming	Universal Music AB	
United States	15 January 2020	Digital download; streaming	Universal Music AB	
Italy	31 January 2020	Contemporary hit radio	Universal Music AB	
United States	26 September 2020	10" picture vinyl	Island Records	
