= Sadder Badder Cooler =

2020 song by Tove Lo

Single by Tove Lo

from the album Sunshine Kitty (Paw Prints Edition)
- Released: 22 May 2020
- Genre: Electropop
- Length: 2:51
- Label: Republic
- Songwriters: Ebba Nilsson; Elvira Anderfjärd; Karl Sandberg
- Producer: Elvira Anderfjärd

Tove Lo singles chronology
"I'm Coming" (2020)	"Sadder Badder Cooler" (2020)	"Don't Say Goodbye" (2020)

"Sadder Badder Cooler" (stylized in all lowercase) is a song by Swedish singer and songwriter Tove Lo from the expanded edition of her fourth studio album Sunshine Kitty. It was released as a single from the "Paw Prints Edition", throughout Republic Records on 22 May 2026, concurrently with the reissue.

== Composition and release ==
The electropop track was written by Tove Lo with Karl Sandberg and Elvira Anderfjärd, and produced by the latter. "Sadder Badder Cooler" was released on the same day as Lo's re-issue of Sunshine Kitty on 22 May 2020 with two official remixes by The Presets and King Arthur. It appears as the opening track on the "Paw Prints Edition". Remixes by Banx & Ranx, MUTO, Y2K, and Liu followed on 17 July, 31 July, 7 August, and 4 September 2020 respectively.

== Live performances ==
Lo performed the song live at Billboard and The Hollywood Reporter's "Pride Prom" on 13 June 2020 and on The Late Show with Stephen Colbert on 27 June 2020.

== Music video ==
The song's music video, animated by Venturia Animation Studios and Dreambear Productions, depicts a cartoon Lo and her animal sidekick Sunshine Kitty "on a Kill Bill-style mission to take down several Disney princes.

== Track listing ==
Sadder Badder Cooler – The Presets Remix

1. "Sadder Badder Cooler" (The Presets Sunshine Remix) – 3:44
2. "Sadder Badder Cooler" (The Presets Midnight Remix) – 5:40

Sadder Badder Cooler – King Arthur Remix

1. "Sadder Badder Cooler" (King Arthur Remix) – 2:55

Sadder Badder Cooler – Banx & Ranx Remix

1. "Sadder Badder Cooler" (Banx & Ranx Remix) – 2:29

Sadder Badder Cooler – MUTO Remix

1. "Sadder Badder Cooler" (MUTO Remix) – 3:15

Sadder Badder Cooler – Y2K Remix

1. "Sadder Badder Cooler" (Y2K Remix) – 3:04

Sadder Badder Cooler – Liu Remix

1. "Sadder Badder Cooler" (Liu Remix) – 2:17

== Personnel ==
Credits adapted from Tidal.

- Tove Lo – songwriting, vocals
- Elvira Anderfjärd – songwriting, production, background vocals, drums, electric bass, synthesizer, programming, vocal programming
- Max Martin – songwriting
- Michael Ilbert – mixing
- Chris Gehringer – mastering engineer

== Release history ==
Release formats for "Sadder Badder Cooler"
Country	Date	Format	Version	Label	Ref.
Various	22 May 2020	Digital download; streaming	Album version	Republic	
Various	22 May 2020	Digital download; streaming	The Presets Remix	Republic	
Various	22 May 2020	Digital download; streaming	King Arthur Remix	Republic	
Various	17 July 2020	Digital download; streaming	Banx & Ranx Remix	Republic	
Various	31 July 2020	Digital download; streaming	MUTO Remix	Republic	
Various	7 August 2020	Digital download; streaming	Y2K Remix	Republic	
Various	4 September 2020	Digital download; streaming	Liu Remix	Republic	

== Charts ==
Chart (2020)	Peak position
Sweden Heatseeker (Sverigetopplistan)	15
