= Sweettalk My Heart =

2019 song by Tove Lo

Single by Tove Lo

from the album Sunshine Kitty
- Released: 18 September 2019
- Studio: MXM Studios (Stockholm, Sweden); MXM Studios (Los Angeles, USA); House Mouse Studios (Stockholm); Jack & Coke Studios (Stockholm)
- Genre: Electropop
- Length: 3:00
- Label: Universal Music AB
- Songwriter(s): Tove Lo; Ludvig Söderberg; Jakob Hazell; Svante Halldin
- Producer(s): A Strut; Jack & Coke

Tove Lo singles chronology
"Really Don't Like U" (2019)	"Sweettalk My Heart" (2019)	"Bikini Porn" (2020)

Music video
- "Sweettalk My Heart" on YouTube

"Sweettalk My Heart" is a song by Swedish singer-songwriter Tove Lo. It was released as the fifth single off of her fourth studio album, Sunshine Kitty, on 18 September 2019 for digital download and streaming. It is an electropop composition with influences of dancehall music. Upon release, the song received positive reviews from music critics, who complimented its production and lyrics. It received a music video, as well as a lyric video.

== Background ==
According to Lo, "Sweettalk My Heart" was "the first song [she] wrote where [she] felt, 'Am I making my fourth album right now? Is this where it’s going to go?'". The track was recorded at MXM Studios in Los Angeles, USA, and Stockholm, Sweden, as well as Jack & Coke Studios and House Mouse Studios, both in Stockholm.

== Composition and lyrics ==
"Sweettalk My Heart" is a "softer-edged" electropop track composed in the key of E♭ minor and a tempo of 95 beats per minute. Michael Love Michael of PAPER described it as a "stylistic merge of dancehall-inflected breakbeats" and "synthesized '80s bombast". Lyrically, it discusses "love's deceptive, darker multitudes"

== Critical reception ==
Upon release, "Sweettalk My Heart" received positive reviews from music critics. Writers for website Scandipop considered the song a highlight on its parent album and Lo's fifth best single in her discography.

== Personnel ==
Credits adapted from the Sunshine Kitty CD booklet.

- Tove Lo – vocals, songwriting
- Ludvig Söderberg – songwriting
- Jakob Hazell – songwriting, production, programming, drums, bass, keys
- Svante Halldin – songwriting, production, programming, drums, bass, keys
- A Strut – production

== Track listing ==
Digital download — Live at Vevo

- "Sweettalk my Heart" (Live at Vevo) — 3:23

Digital download — Team Salut Remix

- "Sweettalk my Heart" (Team Salut Remix) — 2:59

Digital download — Aazar Remix

- "Sweettalk my Heart" (Aazar Remix) — 3:15

Digital download — BloodPop® & BURNS Vitaclub Remix

- "Sweettalk my Heart" (BloodPop® & BURNS Vitaclub Remix) — 4:58

Digital download — Jeremy Olander Remix

- "Sweettalk my Heart" (Jeremy Olander Remix) — 7:38

== Charts ==
Chart (2019)	Peak position
Belgium (Ultratip Bubbling Under Wallonia)	25
New Zealand Hot Singles (RMNZ)	21
Sweden (Sverigetopplistan)	48
