= On oublie le reste =

Song by Jenifer featuring Kylie Minogue

Single by Jenifer featuring Kylie Minogue

from the album Nouvelle page
- Language: French
- Released: 9 October 2019
- Length: 3:08
- Label: TF1 Musique, Sony Music, UMG, Export Music, Barbara Pravi ACA (on behalf of Capitol Records France)
- Songwriters: Cathy Dennis; Rob Davis; Alain Corson; Barbara Pravi; Boban Apostolov; Manon Palmer
- Producer: Bob Sinclar

Jenifer singles chronology
"Les choses simples" (2019)	"On oublie le reste" (2019)

Kylie Minogue singles chronology
"Really Don't Like U" (2019)	"On oublie le reste" (2019)	"Say Something" (2020)

Music video
- "On oublie le reste" on YouTube

"On oublie le reste" (English: We Forget the Rest) is a song by French singer-songwriter Jenifer featuring Australian singer Kylie Minogue. It was released on 9 October 2019, as the third overall single and first from the deluxe edition of Jenifer's 2018 studio album Nouvelle Page. It contains an interpolation of Minogue's 2001 single, "Can't Get You Out of My Head".

== Music video ==
The music video was released on 6 December 2019, and depicts Jenifer dancing under neon lights to the famous "la la la" from her single, "Can't Get You Out of My Head". Minogue does not appear in the video.

== Charts ==
Chart (2019)	Peak position
French Digital Songs Sales Chart (SNEP)	9
