= Scars (Tove Lo song) =

Single by Tove Lo

from the album Allegiant (Original Motion Picture Score)
- Released: 19 February 2016
- Length: 3:42
- Label: Universal
- Songwriters: Tove Lo; Jakob Jerlström; Ludvig Söderberg
- Producer: The Struts

Tove Lo singles chronology
"Moments" (2015)	"Scars" (2016)	"Desire" (2016)

Audio video
- "Scars" on YouTube

"Scars" is a song by Swedish singer and songwriter Tove Lo, released as the lead single of the soundtrack of the 2016 film The Divergent Series: Allegiant on February 19, 2016. It was written by Lo, along with Jakob Jerlström and Ludvig Söderberg; the latter two also produced the song. Lo had previously collaborated with both on her debut studio album, Queen of the Clouds (2014).

== Charts ==
Chart (2016)	Peak position
US Alternative Digital Song Sales (Billboard)	9
US Pop Digital Song Sales (Billboard)	38

== Release history ==
Region	Date	Format	Label	Ref.
Australia	19 February 2016	Digital download	Universal	
Belgium	19 February 2016	Digital download	Universal	
Canada	19 February 2016	Digital download	Universal	
Denmark	19 February 2016	Digital download	Universal	
Finland	19 February 2016	Digital download	Universal	
New Zealand	19 February 2016	Digital download	Universal	
Sweden	19 February 2016	Digital download	Universal	
United Kingdom	19 February 2016	Digital download	Universal	
United States	19 February 2016	Digital download	Universal	
