= Fun (Coldplay song) =

2015 song by Coldplay and Tove Lo

Song by Coldplay featuring Tove Lo

from the album A Head Full of Dreams
- Released: 4 December 2015
- Recorded: 2014–2015
- Genre: Pop rock
- Length: 4:27
- Label: Parlophone; Atlantic
- Songwriters: Guy Berryman; Jonny Buckland; Will Champion; Chris Martin
- Producers: Rik Simpson; Stargate

"Fun" is a song by British rock band Coldplay, featuring Swedish singer Tove Lo. It is the sixth track from the group's seventh studio album, A Head Full of Dreams (2015). The song was produced by the band's long-time record producer Rik Simpson along with Norwegian production duo Stargate.

== Composition ==
"Fun" is a mid-tempo pop song built as a duet between Chris Martin and Swedish singer Tove Lo, with production by longtime collaborator Rik Simpson and Norwegian pop architects Stargate. The song features "electronic heartbeats" under a mid-tempo framework "a Cure-style darkness towards the end."

The title also echoes an earlier, unrelated Coldplay composition: Martin and his bandmates wrote a different song called "Fun" for Natalie Imbruglia's 2009 album Come to Life.

== Reception ==
Critics were divided but frequently singled out the duet in album overage, considering it a reference to the end of Martin's marriage to Gwyneth Paltrow. AllMusic remarked that Tove Lo "eases right into" the song's atmosphere, while Consequence noted the song "palpitates like an unbroken heart". NME praised the track's narrative, calling it a "refreshing change" compared to the expected slow tempos and minor keys of a stereotypical Coldplay song. Pitchfork considered the collaboration emblematic of the album's guest-driven approach.

== Personnel ==
Credits are adapted from A Head Full of Dreams liner notes.

Coldplay

- Guy Berryman – bass guitar, keyboards
- Jonny Buckland – lead guitar, keyboards
- Will Champion – drums, programming
- Chris Martin – lead vocals, acoustic guitar

Additional musicians

- Mikkel S Eriksen – additional instruments, production, mixing
- Tor Erik Hermansen – additional instruments, production, mixing
- Tove Lo – featured vocals
- Rik Simpson – audio mixer

== Charts ==
Weekly chart performance
Chart (2015–2016)	Peak position
France (SNEP)	118
Netherlands (Single Top 100)	86
Sweden Heatseeker (Sverigetopplistan)	10
UK Singles (Official Charts)	164
US Hot Rock & Alternative Songs (Billboard)	28

== Certifications ==
Certifications
Region	Certification	Certified units/sales
Italy (FIMI)	Gold	25,000^{‡}
^{‡} Sales+streaming figures based on certification alone.
