= Pressure (Martin Garrix song) =

2021 song by Martin Garrix and Tove Lo

Single by Martin Garrix featuring Tove Lo
- Released: 5 February 2021
- Genre: Pop, Deep house
- Length: 2:24
- Label: STMPD RCRDS
- Songwriters: Martijn Garritsen; Oskar Rindborg; Tove Lo; Wilhelm Börjesson
- Producers: Martin Garrix; Osrin

Martin Garrix singles chronology
"Higher Ground" (2020)	"Pressure" (2021)	"We Are the People" (2021)

Tove Lo singles chronology
"Don't Say Goodbye" (2020)	"Pressure" (2021)	"Give It All Up" (2021)

Music video
- "Pressure" on YouTube

"Pressure" is a song recorded by Dutch DJ and record producer Martin Garrix featuring Swedish singer-songwriter Tove Lo. It was released on 5 February 2021 by STMPD RCRDS.

== Background and content ==
On 2 February 2021, Garrix published the cover artwork of "Pressure" on the social media accounts of Stmpd Rcrds before the song's release on 5 February. According to many website's articles, the song possesses a deep melody that matches Tove Lo's "edgy" vocal.

== Charts ==
=== Weekly charts ===
Weekly chart performance for "Pressure"
Chart (2021)	Peak position
Belgium (Ultratip Bubbling Under Flanders)	16
Global Excl. US (Billboard)	197
Hungary (Single Top 40)	32
Lithuania (AGATA)	33
Netherlands (Dutch Top 40)	25
Netherlands (Single Top 100)	29
New Zealand Hot Singles (RMNZ)	7
Slovakia (Singles Digitál Top 100)	48
Sweden (Sverigetopplistan)	39
Switzerland (Schweizer Hitparade)	91
US Hot Dance/Electronic Songs (Billboard)	10

=== Year-end charts ===
Year-end chart performance for "Pressure"
Chart (2021)	Position
US Hot Dance/Electronic Songs (Billboard)	42

== Certifications ==
Certifications for "Pressure"
Region	Certification	Certified units/sales
Brazil (Pro-Música Brasil)	Platinum	40,000^{‡}
^{‡} Sales+streaming figures based on certification alone.
