= Really Don't Like U =

2019 single by Tove Lo & Kylie Minogue

Single by Tove Lo featuring Kylie Minogue

from the album Sunshine Kitty
- Released: 6 September 2019
- Studio: Zenseven (Tarzana); MXM (Los Angeles); SARM (London)
- Genre: Electropop; synth-pop; disco; electro; eurodance; R&B
- Length: 3:45
- Label: Republic
- Songwriters: Ebba Nilsson; Caroline Ailin; Ian Kirkpatrick
- Producer: Ian Kirkpatrick

Tove Lo singles chronology
"Jacques" (2019)	"Really Don't Like U" (2019)	"Sweettalk My Heart" (2019)

Kylie Minogue singles chronology
"New York City" (2019)	"Really Don't Like U" (2019)	"On oublie le reste" (2019)

Lyric video
- "Really Don't Like U" on YouTube

"Really Don't Like U" (stylised in sentence case) is a song by Swedish singer-songwriter Tove Lo featuring Australian singer Kylie Minogue. It was released on 6 September 2019, as the fourth single from Lo's fourth studio album Sunshine Kitty (2019). The song was written by Lo, Caroline Ailin and its producer Ian Kirkpatrick. "Really Don't Like U" is an electropop, synth-pop, disco and electro song. The lyrics convey a story of Lo seeing an ex at a party with his new girlfriend, played by Minogue. The two women sing of mutual jealousy and insecurity, with Minogue feeling ashamed of the conflict before conceding that her new partner is still not over Lo.

== Background and recording ==
"Really Don't Like U" was written by Lo, Caroline Ailin and its producer Ian Kirkpatrick. Lo explained how the song came to fruition, stating that she met Minogue in Hong Kong at an AmfAR event and expressed interest to collaborate on a track. Lo then pitched the song to Minogue, who decided to feature. "Really Don't Like U" was then announced in August 2019, as part of the track list of her fourth upcoming album, Sunshine Kitty. In a press release for the single, Minogue commented that their collaboration "seemingly came out of nowhere" but was the "perfect moment". Lo also stated:

Even though it’s now out, I still can’t believe Kylie is on [the song]. Kylie and I met last year at an amFAR event in Hong Kong. When she said she wanted to work together, I made a serious mental note! I couldn’t be more thrilled and honored to have someone I love and respect so much on this track.

The track was recorded at Zenseven Studios in Tarzana, California, USA, MXM Studios in Los Angeles, USA and SARM Studios in London, UK.

== Composition ==
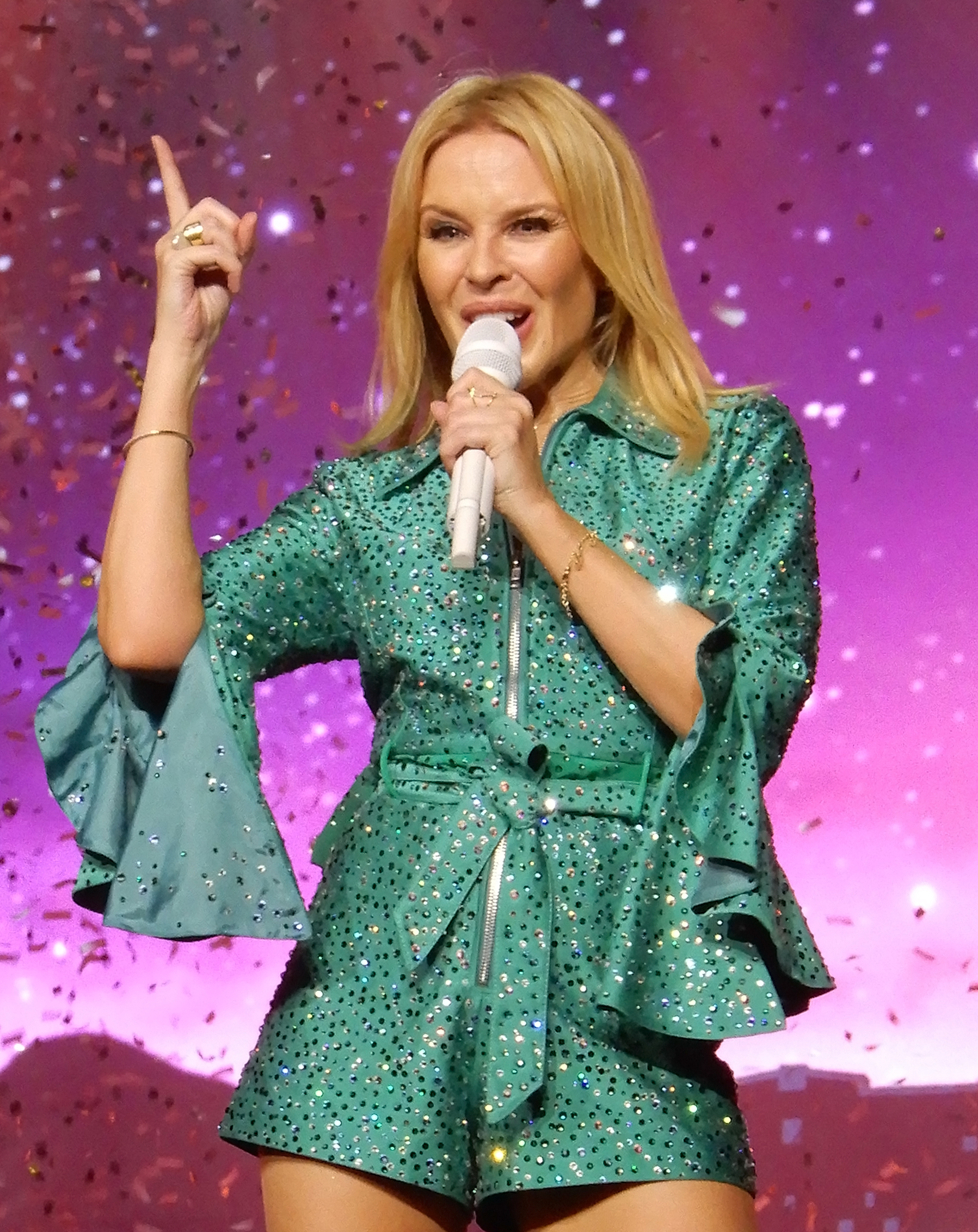
Minogue (pictured in 2018) recorded her vocals for "Really Don't Like U" in London.

The song runs for three minutes and 45 seconds. Music critics have described "Really Don't Like U" as a blend of synth-pop, disco, electro, eurodance, and R&B. The "slinky" production is based on a skittering, minimal electronic beat, while the duo sing together on the chorus: "I know I’ve got no right to / I know I’ve got no right to / Really, I just don’t like you".

Lyrically, the song discusses the feelings of seeing an ex with another girl at a party. Critics found Lo's premise unpleasant, moody, enraged, and disparaged. They identified the theme as jealousy, heartbreak, and partying.

== Release and reception ==
"Really Don't Like U" was announced in August 2019 as part of the tracklist of Lo's fourth studio album, Sunshine Kitty. The track was digitally released as the album's fourth single on 6 September 2019. The single peaked at number 37 on the New Zealand Hot Singles, and number 74 on the UK Singles Downloads Chart during the week of 13 September 2019.

The song has received critical acclaim from music critics. Emily Zemler of Rolling Stone commented that "the pair's airy vocals meld together over the chorus", while an editor from Out called the collaboration "pop excellence", stating that the song "deconstructs girl-on-girl hate while still acknowledging that just because we know a behavior is wrong doesn’t mean we can stop doing it." Shaad D'Souza of The Fader called the song "a typically sly, chaotic track from the Swedish pop musician".

== Promotion ==
Lo and Minogue promoted their collaboration extensively on Instagram. The lyric video for "Really Don't Like U" premiered on Lo's official YouTube channel on 13 September. Filmed in London and Prague, the video featured karaoke booth-style lyric captions. It begins with both women confined to their apartments, anxious to avoid a confrontation. Lo is then seen wandering through the deserted streets, while Minogue picks up a microphone at a karaoke bar. An American Sign Language video, featuring sign interpretation by Briana Johnson, was released in August 2020. This video served to promote the Paw Prints Edition of Sunshine Kitty.

Lo performed "Really Don't Like U" for the first time at London's Shacklewell Arms on September 9, 2019. The performance was part of NME's Girls To The Front, a series that champions women and non-binary artists. NME picked the performance as a highlight of her set. The singer later included the track on the setlist for her Sunshine Kitty Tour (2019–2020). She performed the track barefoot during the Dirt Femme Tour (2022–2023). Reviewing her opening night at Dublin's 3Olympia in October 2022, Molly Cantwell of Hot Press noted the performance "sent the crowd into a tizzy."

== Credits and personnel ==
Credits adapted from Sunshine Kitty liner notes:

Recording

- Zenseven Studios, Tarzana, CA
- MXM Studios, Los Angeles, CA
- SARM Studios, London, UK

Personnel

- Tove Lo – vocals, composition, lyrics
- Kylie Minogue – vocals
- Caroline Ailin – composition
- Ian Kirkpatrick – production, composition, programming, instrument
- Henrik Michelsen – record Minogue's vocals
- John Hanes – mixing
- Serban Ghenea – mixing
- Chris Gehringer – mastering

== Charts ==
Chart (2019)	Peak position
New Zealand Hot Singles (RMNZ)	37
UK Singles Downloads (Official Charts)	74
