= Jacques (song) =

2019 single by Jax Jones and Tove Lo

Single by Jax Jones and Tove Lo

from the album Snacks (Supersize) and Sunshine Kitty
- Released: 28 August 2019
- Genre: House; electro house; techno; deep house
- Length: 3:23
- Songwriters: Ebba Tove Nilsson; Mark Ralph; Timucin Lam; Uzoechi Emenike
- Producers: Jax Jones; Ralph (co.)

Jax Jones singles chronology
"Harder" (2019)	"Jacques" (2019)	"This Is Real" (2019)

Tove Lo singles chronology
"Bad as the Boys" (2019)	"Jacques" (2019)	"Really Don't Like U" (2019)

Music video
- "Jacques" on YouTube

"Jacques" is a song by English DJ and record producer Jax Jones and Swedish singer Tove Lo. It was released on 28 August 2019 as the lead single from Jones' debut studio album Snacks (Supersize) (2019) and the third single from Lo's fourth studio album Sunshine Kitty (2019). It was written by Jones, Lo, Mark Ralph, and Uzoechi Emenike, and produced by Jax and Ralph.

== Music video ==
The music video for the song alternates between showing Jax Jones playing music on his DJ set and Tove Lo singing.

== Background ==
"Jacques" was confirmed as the second track on Jones' album Snacks (Supersize) on 19 July, and as the seventh track on Lo's album Sunshine Kitty on 2 August. On 26 August, Jones and Lo announced on social media that the song would be released on 28 August.

== Charts ==
Chart (2019)	Peak position
Belgium Dance (Ultratop Flanders)	49
Belgium Dance (Ultratop Wallonia)	21
Ireland (IRMA)	65
Sweden (Sverigetopplistan)	61
UK Singles (OCC)	67
UK Dance (OCC)	14
US Hot Dance/Electronic Songs (Billboard)	35
