= Sunshine Kitty =

Studio album by Tove Lo
- Released: 20 September 2019
- Recorded: January–April 2019
- Studios: MXM Studios (Stockholm, Sweden); MXM Studios (Los Angeles, US); House Mouse Studios (Stockholm); Jack & Coke Studios (Stockholm)
- Genres: Electropop; synth-pop
- Length: 40:27
- Languages: English; French; Italian; Portuguese
- Label: Island
- Producers: Ludvig Söderberg; The Struts; Shellback; Jax Jones; Mark Ralph; Ian Kirkpatrick; Jack & Coke; Mattman & Robin; Joel Little

Tove Lo chronology
Blue Lips (2017)	Sunshine Kitty (2019)	Dirt Femme (2022)

Singles from Sunshine Kitty
- 1. "Glad He's Gone" Released: 31 May 2019; 2. "Bad as the Boys" Released: 2 August 2019; 3. "Jacques" Released: 28 August 2019; 4. "Really Don't Like U" Released: 6 September 2019; 5. "Sweettalk My Heart" Released: 18 September 2019

Sunshine Kitty is the fourth studio album by Swedish singer Tove Lo, released on 20 September 2019 by Island Records. It includes the singles "Glad He's Gone", "Bad as the Boys" featuring Alma, "Jacques" with Jax Jones, "Really Don't Like U" featuring Kylie Minogue and "Sweettalk My Heart". It was her final album under Island Records, as she became an independent artist on her following releases.

== Background ==
The album was recorded in Los Angeles and Stockholm, Sweden and was called a "new chapter" for Lo, "marked by reclamation of confidence, hard-earned wisdom, more time, and a budding romance". Lo also said the album title is a "play on pussy power", calling the cartoon cat "an extension of me and part of the new music". Lo also said the songs are "happier" than her previous material, that the album will feature "dirty pop, sad bangers, and badass collabs", and "There's definitely some club bangers on there, but some of it is a bit more acoustic".

== Paw Prints Edition ==
On 18 May 2020 the Taiwanese audio streaming website corp.com.tw released the tracklist for Sunshine Kitty: Paw Prints Edition. Paw Prints Edition features the same songs as Sunshine Kitty, plus eight more tracks. The lyrics website Genius also released a tracklist for the Paw Prints Edition, featuring the same tracks as on corp.com.tw. Lo also released the cover for the song "Sadder Badder Cooler" on her social media, announced the release date for the song with a special animated snippet of Sunshine Kitty (the lynx present on the album cover) and her animated as Disney characters walking to the rhythm of the song. Lo can be seen walking with a sword on her shoulder and dressed in an unbuttoned jacket, with her hair blue like in the "Bikini Porn" music video. Sunshine Kitty can be seen with sunglasses walking next to Lo. On May 19, Lo announced on her social media that Sunshine Kitty: Paw Prints Edition was going to be released on 22 May 2020.

== Promotion ==
The promotion for Sunshine Kitty unofficially began on 25 May 2019, with Lo posting pictures of doodles to her social media accounts over three days. On 28 May, she posted a short video which introduced the character Sunshine Kitty and contained a snippet of "Glad He's Gone", as well as its release date at the end of the video. Lo also posted a picture of herself in a kitchen along with a lyric from the track before revealing the title and precise time and date of the first single's release. "Glad He's Gone" received three videos: a lyric video, which premiered on the same day as the track, a vertical video, and the official music video. Lo also talked about the album in a few interviews, such as one with Billboard, BUILD Series LDN, and MTV News. "Glad He's Gone" was performed at iHeartRadio, The Late Show with Stephen Colbert, and Szigest Festival 2019, as well as some other festivals and small shows.

On 30 July, Lo posted a teaser of Sunshine Kitty's next single, "Bad as the Boys", which included its release date and time. The album's tracklist was revealed in a short video and a photo posted to Lo's social media. On 26 August, Lo teased the release of another song, "Jacques", a collaboration with Jax Jones. The song premiered as the album's third single two days later. The Sunshine Kitty Release Show took place on 19 September at Bowery Ballroom, New York City.

Every song released as a single from the album received a lyric video, while "Glad He's Gone", "Jacques", "Are U Gonna Tell Her?" and "Sweettalk My Heart" received music videos.

== Critical reception ==
Professional ratings
Aggregate scores
Source	Rating
AnyDecentMusic?	6.8/10
Metacritic	75/100
Review scores
Source	Rating
AllMusic	3.5/5 stars
The Arts Desk	4/5 stars
Evening Standard	3/5 stars
Exclaim!	7/10
The Guardian	3/5 stars
NME	4/5 stars
Pitchfork	7.2/10
Q	4/5 stars
The Times	3/5 stars

Sunshine Kitty received positive reviews from contemporary music critics. At Metacritic, which assigns a normalized rating out of 100 to reviews from mainstream critics, the album has an average score of 75 based on six reviews, indicating "generally favorable reviews". Aggregator AnyDecentMusic? gave it 6.8 out of 10, based on their assessment of the critical consensus. It was rated 72 out of 100 at Album of the Year.

AllMusic's Heather Phares praised the album's musical direction, writing, "As Lo puts her stamp on all of Sunshine Kitty's different sounds and emotions, there's a breeziness that hasn't been present in her music since Queen of the Clouds". Hannah Mylrea of NME complimented Lo's use of her already known musical formula, stating that it is "no bad thing: [the album] features some of her best work in years as she boldly embraces new sounds and unusual collaborators". The Arts Desk's Thomas H Green praised the album's mature tone and songwriting. Mick Jacobs of Spectrum Culture classified the album as an improvement over the singer's previous ones, highlighting its songwriting. Similarly, Louise Bruton of The Irish Times noted that the album "feel[s] like the light at the end of the drug-fuelled tunnel that she resided in" on her previous releases, while Max Russell of The Young Folks wrote "With the success of her last three moonlit albums, Tove Lo could have continued chasing the night highs, but Sunshine Kitty shines a light on a wiser yet still wild side of her".

Beth Bowles of Exclaim! considered the number of tracks to be large, but stated that "Essentially, every song on this album would bring anyone to their feet". Writing for The Guardian, Laura Snapes criticized Lo's nihilism throughout Sunshine Kitty, stating that it "dominated the latter half of the decade and no longer sounds as fresh as it did". Evening Standard's Harry Fletcher wrote that the album's "often forgettable collection of songs doesn’t do justice to Tove Lo’s obvious charisma and lyrical candor".

=== Year-end rankings ===
Publication	Accolade	Rank	Ref.
Esquire	50 Best Albums of 2019	—N/a	
Gaffa	20 best foreign albums of the year	18	
Idolator	The 20 Best Pop Albums Of 2019	15	

== Track listing ==
No.	Title	Writer(s)	Producer(s)	Length
1.	"Gritty Pretty" (intro)	Tove Lo; Ludvig Söderberg; Jakob Jerlström	The Struts	0:45
2.	"Glad He's Gone"	Lo; Shellback; Söderberg; Jerlström	The Struts; Shellback	3:16
3.	"Bad as the Boys" (featuring Alma)	Lo; Söderberg; Jerlström	The Struts	3:06
4.	"Sweettalk My Heart"	Lo; Söderberg; Svante Halldin; Jakob Hazell	A Strut; Jack & Coke	2:59
5.	"Stay Over"	Lo; Söderberg; Halldin; Hazell	A Strut; Jack & Coke	3:09
6.	"Are U Gonna Tell Her?" (featuring Zaac)	Lo; Söderberg; Jerlström; Isaac Daniel; Umberto Tavares; Jefferson Junior	The Struts	2:38
7.	"Jacques" (with Jax Jones)	Lo; Timucin Aluo; Mark Ralph	Jax Jones; Ralph^{[a]}	3:23
8.	"Mateo"	Lo; Söderberg; Jerlström; Max Martin	The Struts	2:49
9.	"Come Undone"	Lo; Söderberg; Halldin; Hazell	A Strut; Jack & Coke	2:57
10.	"Equally Lost" (featuring Doja Cat)	Lo; Mattias Larsson; Robin Fredriksson; Amalaratna Dlamini; Martin	Mattman & Robin	2:14
11.	"Really Don't Like U" (featuring Kylie Minogue)	Lo; Ian Kirkpatrick; Caroline Ailin	Kirkpatrick	3:45
12.	"Shifted"	Lo; Söderberg; Halldin; Hazell	A Strut; Jack & Coke	3:12
13.	"Mistaken"	Lo; Joel Little	Little	2:56
14.	"Anywhere U Go"	Lo; Söderberg; Halldin; Hazell	A Strut; Jack & Coke	3:09
Total length:				40:19

Sunshine Kitty – Paw Prints Edition – 2020 reissue
No.	Title	Writer(s)	Producer(s)	Length
1.	"Sadder Badder Cooler"	Lo; Elvira Anderfjärd; Martin	Anderfjärd; Chris Gehringer; Michael Ilbert	2:51
2.	"Bikini Porn"	Lo; Finneas; Hazell; Halldin; Söderberg	Finneas; A Strut; Jack & Coke	2:42
3.	"I'm Coming" (Spotify Studios Recording)	Lo; Veronica Maggio; Stefan Olsson; Christian Walz	Gustav Weber Vernet; Anderfjärd	3:16
4.	"Passion and Pain Taste the Same When I'm Weak"	Lo; Finneas	Finneas	4:00
5.	"Gritty Pretty" (intro)	Lo; Söderberg; Jerlström	The Struts	0:45
6.	"Glad He's Gone"	Lo; Shellback; Söderberg; Jerlström	The Struts; Shellback	3:16
7.	"Bad as the Boys" (featuring Alma)	Lo; Söderberg; Jerlström	The Struts	3:06
8.	"Sweettalk My Heart"	Lo; Söderberg; Halldin; Hazell	A Strut; Jack & Coke	2:59
9.	"Stay Over"	Lo; Söderberg; Halldin; Hazell	A Strut; Jack & Coke	3:09
10.	"Are U Gonna Tell Her?" (featuring MC Zaac)	Lo; Söderberg; Jerlström; Daniel; Tavares; Junior	The Struts	2:38
11.	"Јacques" (with Jax Jones)	Lo; Aluo; Ralph	Jax Jones; Ralph^{[a]}	3:23
12.	"Mateo"	Lo; Söderberg; Jerlström; Martin	The Struts	2:49
13.	"Come Undone"	Lo; Söderberg; Halldin; Hazell	A Strut; Jack & Coke	2:57
14.	"Equally Lost" (featuring Doja Cat)	Lo; Larsson; Fredriksson; Dlamini; Martin	Mattman & Robin	2:14
15.	"Really Don't Like U" (featuring Kylie Minogue)	Lo; Kirkpatrick; Ailin	Kirkpatrick	3:45
16.	"Shifted"	Lo; Söderberg; Halldin; Hazell	A Strut; Jack & Coke	3:12
17.	"Mistaken"	Lo; Little	Little	2:56
18.	"Anywhere U Go"	Lo; Söderberg; Halldin; Hazell	A Strut; Jack & Coke	3:09
19.	"Are U Gonna Tell Her?" (Heavy Baile Remix) (featuring MC Zaac)	Lo; MC Zaac; Jerlström; Junior; A Strut; Umberto Tavares; Baile	The Struts; Heavy Baile	2:45
20.	"Sweettalk My Heart" (Team Salut Remix)	Lo; Söderberg; Halldin; Hazell	A Strut; Jack & Coke; Team Salut	2:59
21.	"Sweettalk My Heart" (Live at Vevo)	Lo; Söderberg; Halldin; Hazell	Lo	3:24
22.	"Mistaken" (Live at Vevo)	Lo; Little	Lo	2:59
Total length:				59:33

Notes

- ^{^a} signifies a co-producer
- "Sweettalk My Heart" is stylized as "Sweettalk my Heart".
- "Are U Gonna Tell Her?" is stylized as "Are U gonna tell her?".
- "Really Don't Like U" and "Anywhere U Go" are stylized in sentence case.
- "Sadder Badder Cooler" is stylized in all lowercase.

== Personnel ==
Adapted from AllMusic:

- Tove Lo – primary artist, creative director, executive producer, lyricist, vocals
- Samuel Burgess-Johnson – art direction, design
- Tom Fuller – assistant engineer, engineer
- Gustav Weber Vernet – band/crew member, producer, keyboards
- Rickard Göransson – bass, acoustic guitar
- Jack & Coke – bass, background vocals, beatbox, drums, guitar, keyboards, producer, programmer, programming
- A Strut – bass, background vocals, beatbox, drums, guitar, keyboards, producer, programming
- Mattias Larsson – bass
- Robin Fredriksson – bass, drums, flute, keyboards, percussion, producer, programming, ukulele
- Shellback – bass, guitar, keyboards, percussion, producer, programming
- Mattman – bass, drums, flute, keyboards, percussion, producer, programming, ukulele
- The Struts – bass, drums, keyboards, producer, programming
- Caroline Ailin – lyricist
- Jakob Hazell – lyricist
- Jakob Jeristrom – lyricist
- Max Martin – lyricist
- Ludvig Söderberg – executive producer, keyboards, programming
- MC Zaac – featured artist
- Timucin Lam – instrumentation
- Mark Ralph – instrumentation, mixing, producer
- Ian Kirkpatrick – instrumentation, producer, programming
- Joel Little – producer
- Umberto Tavares – vocal engineer
- Jefferson Junior – vocal engineer
- Charlie Twaddle – creative director
- Jax Jones – featured artist, producer
- Alma – featured artist, vocals
- Kylie Minogue – featured artist, vocals
- Doja Cat – featured artist, vocals, lyricist
- Harley Jones – illustrations
- Stuart Hawkes – mastering
- Serban Ghenea – mixing
- John Hanes – mixing engineer
- Moni Haworth – photography
- Elvira Anderfjärd – producer
- Club Ralph – producer, mixing
- Fera DoMar – vocal engineer
- Henrik Michelsen – vocal engineer
- Kalle Keskikuru – vocal engineer
- Yeti Beats – vocal engineer

== Charts ==
Chart performance for Sunshine Kitty
Chart (2019)	Peak position
Australian Albums (ARIA)	54
Belgian Albums (Ultratop Flanders)	75
Belgian Albums (Ultratop Wallonia)	117
Canadian Albums (Billboard)	49
Dutch Albums (Album Top 100)	51
Finnish Albums (Suomen virallinen lista)	20
French Albums (SNEP)	169
Irish Albums (IRMA)	57
Lithuanian Albums (AGATA)	7
Norwegian Albums (VG-lista)	22
Scottish Albums (Official Charts)	90
Spanish Albums (Promusicae)	97
Swedish Albums (Sverigetopplistan)	19
Swiss Albums (Schweizer Hitparade)	88
UK Albums (Official Charts)	59
US Billboard 200	61
