= Bad as the Boys =

2019 single by Tove Lo featuring Alma

Single by Tove Lo featuring Alma

from the album Sunshine Kitty
- Released: 2 August 2019
- Studio: MXM Studios (Los Angeles, USA); House Mouse Studios (Stockholm, Sweden); Fried Studios (Helsinki, Finland)
- Genre: Pop; indie pop
- Length: 3:06
- Label: Republic
- Songwriters: Jakob Jerlström; Ludvig Söderberg; Ebba Nilsson
- Producer: The Struts

Tove Lo singles chronology
"Glad He's Gone" (2019)	"Bad as the Boys" (2019)	"Jacques" (2019)

Alma singles chronology
"Lonely Night" (2019)	"Bad as the Boys" (2019)	"How It's Done" (2019)

Lyric video
- "Bad As the Boys" on YouTube

"Bad as the Boys" is a song by Swedish singer-songwriter Tove Lo featuring Finnish singer Alma, released on 2 August 2019 as the second single from her fourth album Sunshine Kitty. It marks Lo and Alma's third collaboration, following their feature on Charli XCX's 2017 single "Out of My Head" and the remix of Lo's 2018 single "Bitches".

== Recording and promotion ==
The song was recorded at MXM Studios in Los Angeles, USA, House Mouse Studios in Stockholm, Sweden and Fried Studios in Helsinki, Finland. Lo announced the song in a clip posted to social media on 30 July, showing herself singing a portion of the song a cappella as the lyrics appear onscreen. The following day, Lo revealed the first four tracks of Sunshine Kitty, with "Bad as the Boys" as track three.

== Critical reception ==
"Bad as the Boys" received generally positive reviews, with critics praising its production and lyrics. Mike Wass of Idolator called the track "a banger" and "every bit as good as the preview suggested". Billboard writer Stephen Daw said the song is "a light, summertime bop".

== Charts ==
Chart (2019)	Peak position
New Zealand Hot Singles (RMNZ)	14
Sweden Heatseeker (Sverigetopplistan)	9
