= Moments (Tove Lo song) =

Single by Tove Lo

from the album Queen of the Clouds
- Released: 27 October 2015
- Recorded: 2014; Wolf Cousins Studios (Stockholm)
- Genre: Synth-pop; electropop
- Length: 3:22
- Label: Republic
- Songwriter(s): Ebba Nilsson
- Producer(s): Mattman & Robin

Tove Lo singles chronology
"Timebomb" (2015)	"Moments" (2015)	"Scars" (2016)

Music video
- "Moments" on YouTube

"Moments" is a song by Swedish singer and songwriter Tove Lo. It was released to American contemporary hit radio on 27 October 2015 through Republic Records. It serves as the fourth and final single from her debut studio album, Queen of the Clouds (2014). A remixes EP was released on 4 March 2016, featuring remixes by Seeb, Felix Snow and Samuraii. A new version of the track was included on the Blueprint Edition of her debut studio album.

== Composition ==
"Moments" was written by Tove Lo, while its production was handled by Mattman and Robin. It is a synth-pop and electropop song, with elements of dark pop.

== Music video ==
A music video for "Moments", directed by Tim Erem, was released on 21 October 2015. Natalie Weiner of Billboard wrote that "the video follows Tove Lo through a fairly wild (and intoxicated) night as she sings about her lovable imperfections." American duo singers Niki and Gabi released a cover version on April 29, 2016.

== Release history ==
Region	Date	Format	Label	Ref.
Various	16 September 2014	Digital download (promotional single)	Universal	
United States	27 October 2015	Contemporary hit radio	Republic	
Germany	20 November 2015	Digital download	Universal; Island	
Canada	4 March 2016	Digital download – The Remixes	Universal	
United States	4 March 2016	Digital download – The Remixes	Universal	
