= Glad He's Gone =

Single by Tove Lo

from the album Sunshine Kitty
- Released: 31 May 2019
- Studio: MXM Studios (Stockholm, Sweden); Wolf Cousins Studios (Stockholm)
- Genre: Electropop; pop; ambient pop
- Length: 3:16
- Label: Republic
- Songwriters: Tove Nilsson; Jakob Jerlström; Ludvig Söderberg; Shellback
- Producers: The Struts; Shellback

Tove Lo singles chronology
| "Diva" (2019) | "Glad He's Gone" (2019) | "Bad as the Boys" (2019) |

Music video
- "Glad He's Gone" on YouTube

"Glad He's Gone" is a song recorded by Swedish singer-songwriter Tove Lo for her fourth studio album Sunshine Kitty (2019). It was released worldwide on 31 May 2019 and serviced to American contemporary hit radio stations on 18 June 2019 by Republic Records as the album's lead single. The song was written by Lo and its producers the Struts and Shellback. "Glad He's Gone" is an electropop, pop and ambient pop song with lyrics featuring Lo looking out for and talking to a friend who has a demanding boyfriend.

Commercially, "Glad He's Gone" figured in the top 40 of Sweden and Belgium and peaked at number 19 in New Zealand (Hot Singles). Music critics gave positive reviews of the song. An accompanying music video directed by Vania Heymann and Gal Muggia was uploaded onto Lo's official YouTube account on 17 June 2019. Lo described it as a "bizarre mini action movie" shot in Kyiv. The video was nominated for Best Music Video at the 62nd ceremony of the Grammy Award, becoming Lo's second nomination overall, and the first for her solo work.

== Background and release ==
On 28 May 2019, the singer uploaded a teaser to her Instagram account that shows a yellow cat named Sunshine Kitty dancing to a snippet of a new song, which was simultaneously made available for pre-order, along with the possibility to become a member of the "Sunshine Kitty Club".

== Recording and composition ==
"Glad He's Gone" was recorded at MXM Studios and Wolf Cousins Studios in Stockholm, Sweden. It was mixed by Serban Ghenea at MixStar Studios in Virginia Beach, Virginia, and mastered by Chris Gehringer at Sterling Sound in New York City. It was written by Tove Lo, Shellback, Ludvig Söderberg, and Jakob Jerlström, and produced by Shellback and the Struts. Shellback provided percussion, guitar, bass, keys, and programming for the track, whilst Söderberg also performed the latter two.

Musically, "Glad He's Gone" is an electropop, pop, and ambient pop song with a leading acoustic guitar line. It also contains a "low-key rap beat with pop production". Chris DeVille of Stereogum described the track's sound as a "blend of hip-hop drum programming, lite alt-rock guitars, and squiggly neon post-EDM vocal processing". Paige Sims, writing for Earmilk, referred to the song as a "more stripped-back song" from Lo, while both Earmilk and Idolator deemed the song more "radio-friendly" than the singer's previous releases. About the song, she stated, "It’s the obligatory pep-talk you give your girlfriend when she’s going through a breakup. You’re reminding her she’s your partner-in-crime and showing unconditional support […] I’m telling a real story that I think girls need to hear. You want to know your friends are there for you during a breakup. It’s about all the fun you can have after heartbreak".

== Critical reception ==
Upon its release, music critics gave "Glad He's Gone" positive reviews. Mike Wass of Idolator said the song "sounds like a typically feisty slice of electro-pop with a killer chorus" and "more accessible and radio-friendly" than the Lady Wood era. He called the song a "feisty bop" and "the musical equivalent of a pep-talk". Billboard's Kirsten Spruch opined that "it's smart and full of wisdom but does not compromise the tongue-in-cheek lyricism that makes Tove so lovable", calling it an "infectious, summer-ready track". Peter Helman of Stereogum called "'Glad He's Gone' an acoustic guitar-tinged bop". Rolling Stone's Claire Shaffer opined that the song "is just as much about the power of friendship as it is about telling a mediocre man to hit the road", describing it as "a kiss-off track with a twist". Nina Corcoran of Consequence of Sound deemed it a "self-assured breakup song".

== Music video ==
An accompanying lyric video for "Glad He's Gone" premiered on 31 May 2019, alongside the single's release. A video in a vertical format was uploaded onto the singer's official YouTube channel on 12 June 2019, with the official music video premiering five days later, and a behind-the-scenes video premiering on 6 August 2019 on the same platform. The official video was directed by Vania Heymann and Gal Muggia and produced by ICONOCLAST. Lo thinks it "might be the best" music video of her career, and added:

It tells the story of the song SO WELL while being a bizarre mini action movie. I loved working with the directors Vania & Muggia, who came up with this genius idea. The four day and night shoot in Kyiv was very intense but with the best and most hard working crew! If anything, it made me realize how much I love acting (and that I'm a real committed friend haha).

The music video for "Glad He's Gone" was nominated for Best Music Video at the 62nd ceremony of the Grammy Awards, becoming Lo's second Grammy nomination overall, and the first for her solo work.

== Credits and personnel ==
Credits and personnel adapted from the liner notes from Sunshine Kitty and Tidal.

=== Recording ===
- Recorded at MXM Studios (Stockholm, Sweden) and Wolf Cousins Studios (Stockholm, Sweden)
- Mixed at MixStar Studios (Virginia Beach, Virginia)
- Mastered at Sterling Sound (New York City, New York)

=== Personnel ===
- Tove Lo - vocals, songwriter, composer, associated performer
- Ludvig Söderberg - keyboards, programming, songwriter, composer, associated performer, background vocalist
- Jakob Jerlström - songwriter, composer
- Shellback - guitar, bass guitar, percussion, songwriter, composer, producer, associated performer
- Chris Gehringer - mastering engineer, studio personnel
- Serban Ghenea - mixer, studio personnel
- John Hanes - studio personnel, assistant mixer
- The Struts - producer

== Charts ==
| Chart (2019) | Peak position |
|---|---|
| Belgium (Ultratip Bubbling Under Wallonia) | 40 |
| Lithuania (AGATA) | 94 |
| New Zealand Hot Singles (RMNZ) | 19 |
| Sweden (Sverigetopplistan) | 38 |

== Certifications ==
| Region | Certification | Certified units/sales |
|---|---|---|
| Brazil (Pro-Música Brasil) | Gold | 20,000^{‡} |
^{‡} Sales+streaming figures based on certification alone.

== Release history ==
| Region | Date | Format | Label | Ref. |
|---|---|---|---|---|
| Various | 31 May 2019 | Digital download; streaming | Republic | |
| United States | 18 June 2019 | Top 40 radio | Republic | |
