= Tove Lo =

Swedish singer and songwriter (born 1987)

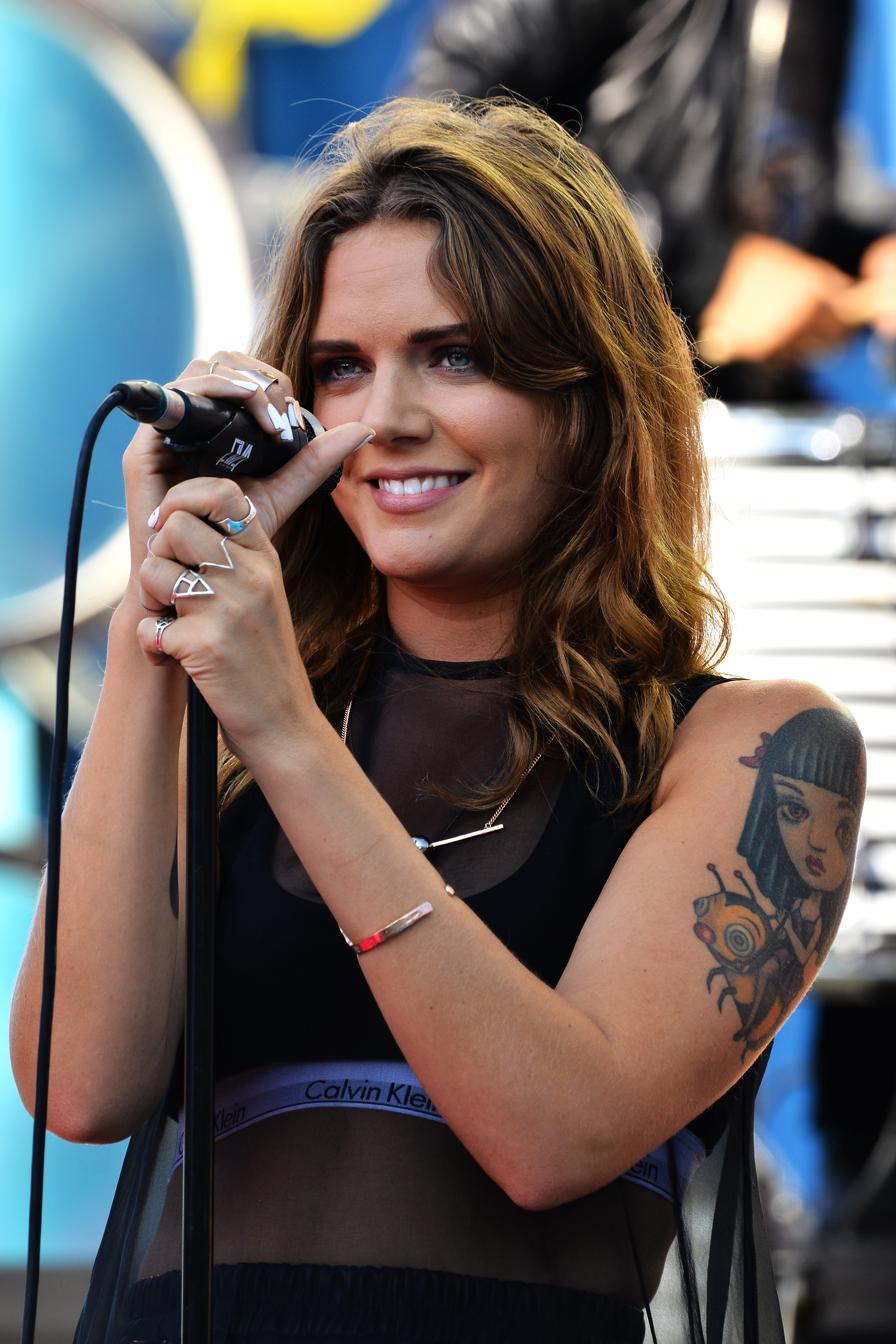
- Lo in 2014

Background information
- Born: Ebba Tove Elsa Nilsson; 29 October 1987 (age 39); Helsingborg, Sweden
- Origin: Djursholm, Danderyd, Sweden
- Genres: Pop; electronic; dance; indie
- Occupations: Singer; songwriter
- Works: Discography; songs written
- Years active: 2006–present
- Labels: Island; Polydor; Pretty Swede; Mtheory
- Member of: Associanu
- Formerly of: Tremblebee
- Spouse: Charlie Twaddle (m. 2020)
- Website: tove-lo.com

Ebba Tove Elsa Nilsson (born 29 October 1987), known professionally as Tove Lo (/ˈtoʊvə ˈloʊ/ TOH-və LOH; Swedish: [ˈtûːvɛ ˈluː]), is a Swedish singer-songwriter. She is known for her raw, grunge-influenced take on pop music. Referring to her autobiographical lyrics, Out called Lo "the saddest girl in Sweden", while Rolling Stone called her "Sweden's darkest pop export".

Raised in the Djursholm district of Danderyd, Lo is an alumna of the music school Rytmus Musikergymnasiet. She formed the rock band Tremblebee in 2006. After it disbanded, Lo pursued a career in songwriting and earned a publishing deal with Warner/Chappell Music in 2011. Working with producers Alexander Kronlund, Max Martin, and Xenomania, she became a successful songwriter, while also recording and releasing her own compositions independently.

In 2013, Lo was signed to Universal Music, Island and Polydor. The following year, Lo rose to prominence with her debut album, Queen of the Clouds, which opened at number 14 on the US Billboard 200 chart in October 2014. It spawned the sleeper hit single "Habits (Stay High)", which peaked at number three on the US Billboard Hot 100, as well as "Talking Body". Her second album, Lady Wood, was released in October 2016 and debuted at number 11 on the Billboard 200. Its lead single, "Cool Girl", became an international hit. Her follow-up records, Blue Lips (2017) and Sunshine Kitty (2019), also performed well, the latter spawning the song "Glad He's Gone", which was nominated for a Grammy Award for Best Music Video. In 2022, she released the album Dirt Femme with singles like "How Long" and "No One Dies from Love". The former was part of the soundtrack for the second season of the American teen drama series Euphoria. Three singles paved the way for her 2026 album Estrus.

In addition to her solo work, Lo has co-written songs for other artists, including Lorde's "Homemade Dynamite" (2017) and Ellie Goulding's "Love Me Like You Do" (2015), a song that garnered her Grammy Award and Golden Globe nominations. She has collaborated with many artists, including Alesso, Broods, Charli XCX, Coldplay, Flume, Nelly Furtado, Martin Garrix, Nick Jonas, Wiz Khalifa, Kylie Minogue, Seven Lions and Urban Cone.

== Early life ==
Ebba Tove Elsa Nilsson was born on 29 October 1987 in Helsingborg, Scania County. She has one older brother and is the daughter of iZettle co-founder Magnus Nilsson and psychologist Gunilla Nilsson Edholm. Her lifelong nickname and adopted stage name, Tove Lo, was given to her at age three by her godmother because of her love for lynxes (singular: "lo" in Swedish). She explained; "There was this lynx at a zoo that was called Tove, and that I totally fell in love with. It was my dear godmother who decided to call me Tove Lo, after that lynx. It stuck." Having lived in Lund until the age of six, Lo's family would move to the affluent Djursholm district of Danderyd, a suburb to Stockholm. She describes her childhood as being "very protected" and her family as "pretty posh". The singer excelled in social sciences at school and grew fond of literature, writing poetry and short stories. In an interview with the BBC, she explained, "Growing up so safe, I think I was looking for something else". During her teens she suffered from bulimia, for which her mother sought to help her through a therapist. After her first serious relationship break-up she cut herself several times due to the embarrassment.

Nilsson developed a love for music and formed a girl band with her friends. She wrote her first song with them at age 10 or 11. By age 15, Lo had written "all these lyrics that nobody ever saw" and had performed twice on stage, before enrolling at Rytmus Musikergymnasiet, a Stockholm music school. During her time at Rytmus, she developed a friendship with Caroline Hjelt, who would later form the Swedish duo Icona Pop. After two years, she graduated from the school and felt assured that her career would be in music despite her parents preferring she do something else.

== Career ==
=== 2006–2013: Career beginnings and songwriting ===
In 2006, Lo began writing songs with Christian Bjerring, a guitarist from Rytmus. The pair then formed a math rock band, Tremblebee, with three other male students from the school. They played together for three years in bars across Sweden, independently releasing some of their songs, before breaking up in 2009. During her time with the band, Lo developed a passion for performing on stage, and was introduced to Swedish production duo The Struts. After Tremblebee broke up, Lo's musical focus turned toward pop. She decided to work on her own tracks, spending six months in her shed studio producing a demo, while doing session singing to support herself. She learned to play the drums and became knowledgeable about music programming and record production. Lo later lived with the duo Icona Pop, in a suburb near Stockholm.

Lo met an A&R man at a party in Stockholm celebrating Icona Pop's first record deal and handed him her demo. They met again by chance in a bar in London. He liked her demo and subsequently introduced her to a songwriting group which included The Struts and Hjelt. In 2011, Lo decided to pursue a career in songwriting and earned a publishing deal with Warner/Chappell Music. This new career path led her to travel to Los Angeles, and work with Swedish producer Max Martin. In 2012, she collaborated with British production team Xenomania and Swedish producer Alexander Kronlund, co-writing Girls Aloud's "Something New", Icona Pop's "We Got the World" and tracks for the duo's self-titled debut album.

Lo then decided to manage an "indie career on the side", recording her more personal compositions and releasing them independently. She released her first single, "Love Ballad", in October 2012, and her second single, "Habits", in March 2013. The latter gained her a substantial online following. Throughout 2013, Max Martin and his fellow Swedish producer Shellback mentored Lo. She was featured on Swedish disc jockey Lucas Nord's single, "Run on Love", released in June 2013 for his album Islands. She also collaborated on the single "Strangers" by Seven Lions and Myon & Shane 54 for The Mortal Instruments: City of Bones film soundtrack (2013), and Seven Lions' extended play (EP), Worlds Apart (2014). She also co-wrote Victoria Justice's "Gold", and tracks for Icona Pop's This Is... Icona Pop.

=== 2014–2015: Truth Serum and Queen of the Clouds ===
Thanks to the strength of her online following, and the popularity of "Habits", Universal Music offered Lo a recording deal, releasing her first single, "Out of Mind" in October 2013. She would eventually be signed to Island and Polydor Records. Lo then shifted her focus to an international singing career, earning critical acclaim for her first live shows in London and during South by Southwest in the United States. Lo's debut EP, Truth Serum, was released on 3 March 2014. It became her first charting release in Sweden where it peaked at number 13. The EP was also a critical success, and led to several news media sources referring to Lo as "a pop star in waiting". It spawned three singles; "Out of Mind", the lead single, appeared only on the Finnish Airplay Chart, peaking at number 39. The next singles were "Habits (Stay High)" and its remixed version by production duo Hippie Sabotage, re-titled as "Stay High". It marked Lo's international breakthrough into mainstream success, peaking at number 13 in Sweden and number six in the United Kingdom. The singer was later named VH1's You Oughta Know and iHeart Radio's On the Verge artist. She made her live television debut performing "Habits (Stay High)" on the Late Night with Seth Meyers in June 2014.

Lo's debut album, Queen of the Clouds, was released on 24 September 2014 to generally positive reviews. It debuted at number 14 on the US Billboard 200, selling 19,000 copies in its first week, and received a Platinum certification by the Recording Industry Association of America (RIAA) in 2016. The album peaked at number 17 in the United Kingdom and number six in Sweden, where the Swedish Recording Industry Association (GLF) certified it platinum for sales of 40,000 units. Serving as the album's lead single, a United States release of "Habits (Stay High)" became a sleeper hit. It was Lo's commercial breakthrough there, peaking at number three on the US Billboard Hot 100. The album's second single "Talking Body" peaked at number 12 on the US Billboard Hot 100, number 16 in Sweden, and number 17 in the United Kingdom. Her next singles were "Timebomb" and "Moments".

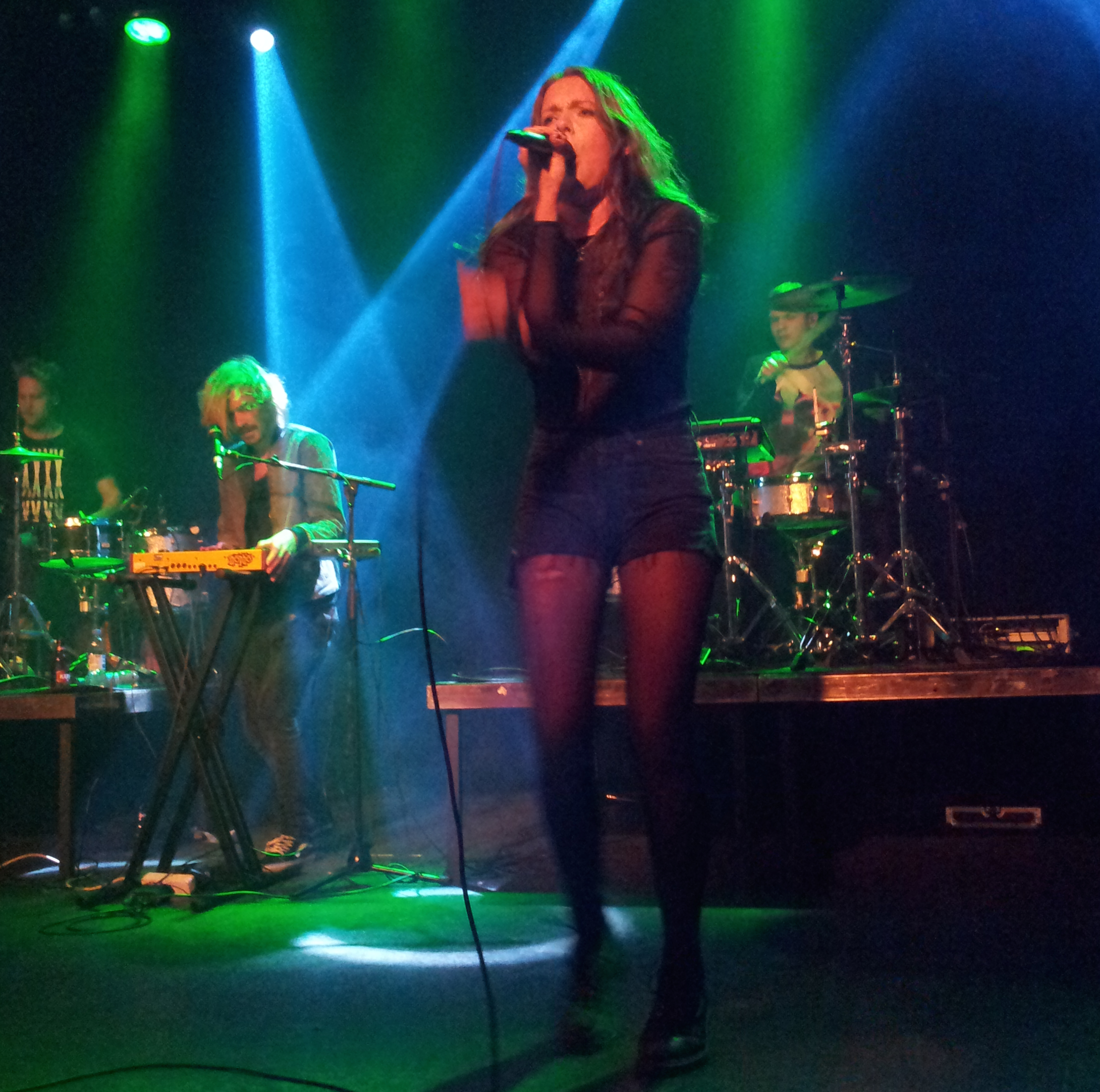
Lo performing at the Tavastia Club in Helsinki in 2014

Lo was also featured on Swedish DJ Alesso's single "Heroes (We Could Be)" from his debut album, Forever. It was a commercial success, peaking at number five in Sweden, number six in the United Kingdom and number thirty-one on the US Billboard Hot 100. Lo served as the opening act for the third leg of American singer Katy Perry's Prismatic World Tour in November 2014. She wrote, produced and recorded the song "Scream My Name" for The Hunger Games: Mockingjay, Part 1 film soundtrack released that month. In late 2014, the singer was signed to Max Martin's songwriting collective Wolf Cousins. The 2014 album releases of Cher Lloyd's Sorry I'm Late, Lea Michele's Louder, and Zara Larsson's 1 featured tracks co-written by Lo. She also co-wrote "What Are You Waiting For?" by The Saturdays. In December 2014, Lo announced she was taking time off to undergo surgery on her vocal cords which had developed cysts. The surgery took place successfully on 3 January 2015.

At the 2015 Grammis, Lo won in the categories for Artist of the Year and Song of the Year for "Habits (Stay High)". She co-wrote the 2015 singles "Love Me Like You Do" by Ellie Goulding and "Sparks" by Hilary Duff. She went on to write two other tracks on Duff's fifth album Breathe In. Breathe Out., "Stay In Love" and "One in A Million". "Love Me Like You Do" topped the UK Singles Chart and peaked at number three on the Billboard Hot 100. It also earned Lo nominations for the Golden Globes, Grammys and Critics' Choice Awards. The Swedish group Urban Cone's single "Come Back to Me"-from their album Polaroid Memories-released in March 2015 featured Lo. She also co-wrote and was featured on "Rumors", on Adam Lambert's third studio album The Original High. On 24 September 2015, a repackaged version of Queen of the Clouds was released as the "Blueprint Edition". It featured all the tracks from the original release, as well as "Heroes (We Could Be)" and tracks from Truth Serum. Four days later, she started her first headlining concert tour, the Queen of the Clouds Tour, featuring fellow Swedish singer Erik Hassle as the opening act. Also that year, she won STIM's Platinum Guitar prize, which is awarded to accomplished Swedish songwriters. Lo was featured on Coldplay's single "Fun", from their seventh album A Head Full of Dreams released in December 2015.

=== 2016–2018: Collaborations, Lady Wood and Blue Lips ===
On 19 February 2016, Lo released "Scars", the lead single of the soundtrack to the film The Divergent Series: Allegiant. The next month, she was featured on the remix version of the single "Desire" by English band Years & Years, which charted in Belgium and Sweden. In the same month, she appeared as a featured artist on Nick Jonas's "Close", the lead single from his third studio album Last Year Was Complicated. The track peaked at number 14 on the US Billboard Hot 100 and received a Platinum certification by the RIAA. It also reached the top 20 in Canada and New Zealand. Lo was also featured on Australian musician Flume's single "Say It", released on 20 April 2016. The track was successful in Oceania, entering the top five in Australia and New Zealand. The artist co-wrote Ellie Goulding's "Still Falling For You", the lead single from the soundtrack to the film Bridget Jones's Baby (2016).

On 28 October 2016, the singer released her second studio album, Lady Wood. It topped the album chart in Sweden and peaked at number 11 on the US Billboard 200. Its lead single, "Cool Girl", entered the top 30 in Australia and was certified Platinum. In New Zealand and Sweden it also made the top 30 where it was certified Gold. Five days before the album's release, Lo announced a European and North American solo tour, the Lady Wood Tour. It would take the singer to twenty-one cities across two continents, beginning on 6 January 2017. To promote the record, she released two short films directed by Tim Erem featuring tracks from the album. The first, Fairy Dust, was uploaded to YouTube on 31 October 2016 but was removed for a few hours because of the site's policies on sexual content. The singer addressed the situation via Twitter, stating that she was not even naked on the clip. The next clip, Fire Fade, was released on 25 August 2017. In late 2016, Lo was an opening act for Maroon 5's The Maroon V Tour across the United States and promoted her album Lady Wood.

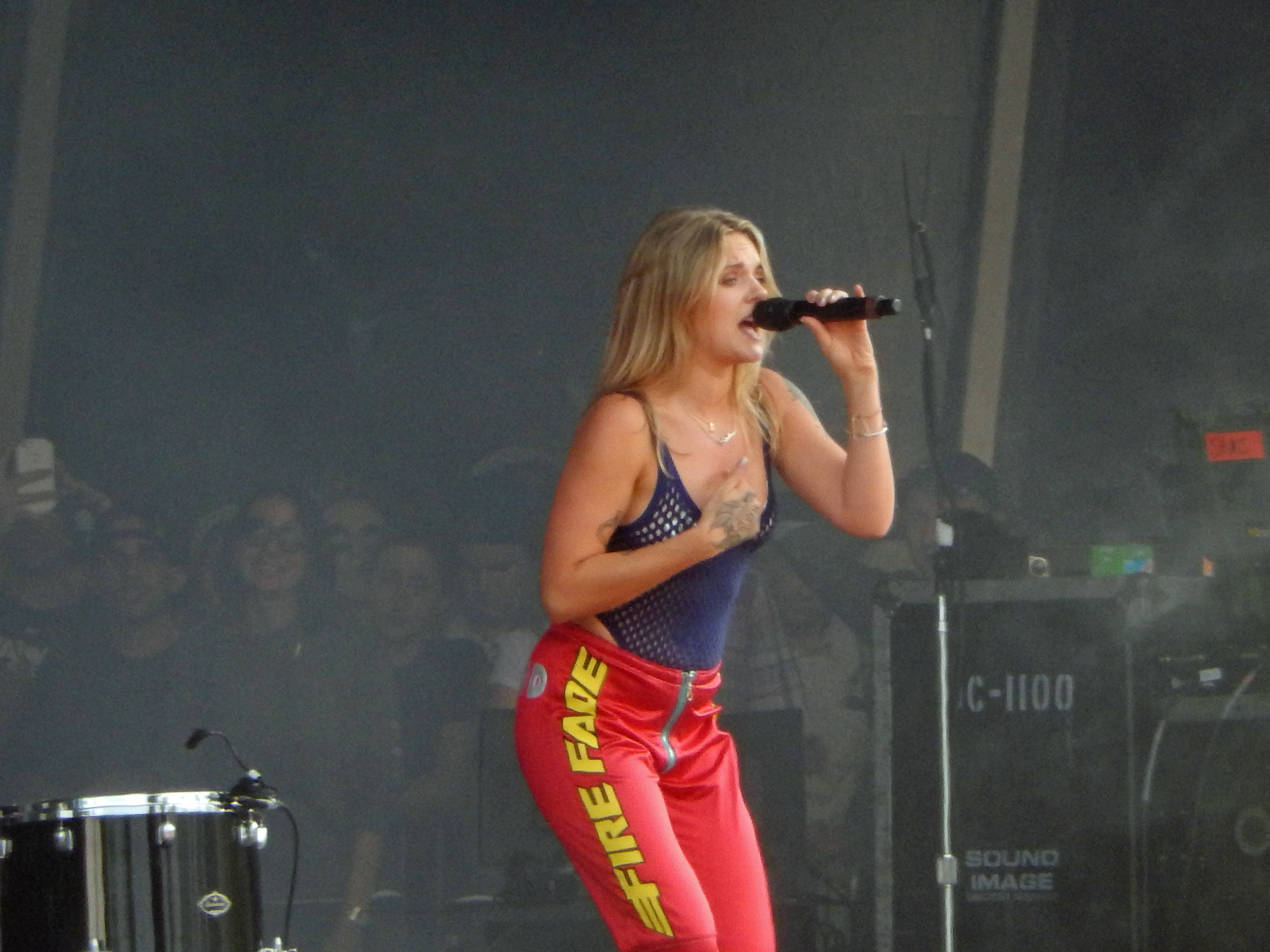
Lo performing at the Lollapalooza in Chicago in 2017

Lo co-wrote and performed the song "Lies in the Dark", from the soundtrack to the film Fifty Shades Darker, released on 10 February 2017. Six days later, it was announced that she would be opening for Coldplay on their A Head Full of Dreams Tour across Europe, the United States, and Canada from June to October 2017. Lo co-wrote "Homemade Dynamite", from New Zealand artist Lorde's second studio album, Melodrama. It was released on 16 September 2017 as the record's third single. On 17 November 2017, Lo released her third studio album, Blue Lips, which she referred to as the sequel to Lady Wood. Compared to Lo's earlier releases, the record was less successful, peaking at number 138 on the US Billboard 200 and at number 15 in Sweden. The first single, "Disco Tits", was released in September 2017. She was later featured on "Out of My Head", the lead single from English singer Charli XCX's fourth mixtape Pop 2, released in December of that year.

On 7 June 2018, Lo released a remix of "Bitches" featuring XCX, Alma, Icona Pop and Elliphant as the second single from Blue Lips.

Lo was featured on the track "Get Up and Fight", by Muse on the Simulation Theory album, which was on 9 November 2018.

=== 2019–2021: Sunshine Kitty ===
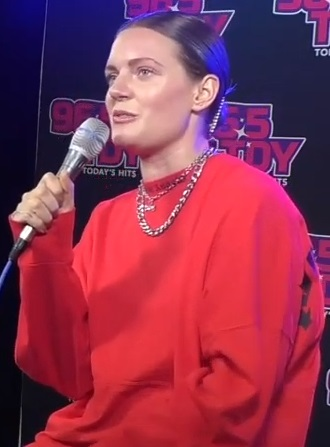
Tove Lo in 2019

On 31 May 2019, Lo announced through a press release that her fourth studio album would be titled Sunshine Kitty. The record's lead single, "Glad He's Gone", was released that same day alongside its lyric video. On 1 August, Lo announced that the album would be released on 20 September 2019. The second single, "Bad as the Boys" featuring Finnish musician Alma, was released the following day. Lo released the third single on 28 August 2019, "Jacques", a collaboration between her and British DJ Jax Jones. She then released "Really Don't Like U", featuring Australian musician and songwriter Kylie Minogue, on 6 September 2019. Five days earlier, Lo appeared in Alma's song "Worst Behaviour".

On 15 January 2020, she released the single "Bikini Porn", which included the song "Passion And Pain Taste The Same When I'm Weak". In March 2020, Lo released an English cover of Veronica Maggio's song "Jag kommer" in partnership with Spotify for their It's Hits playlist. The song reached the top 40 in Sweden, Norway, and New Zealand. In May 2020 she released the Paw Prints Edition of Sunshine Kitty, a reissued version featuring 8 new songs including "Bikini Porn", her cover of "Jag kommer", and new single "sadder badder cooler". In July 2020 she released a contest where six fans could join her on her Animal Crossing: New Horizons island for a special DJ set by creating an outfit for their villager, with the best getting invited to the performance. On 5 February 2021, Martin Garrix released the track "Pressure", which features Lo.

Lo made her feature film acting debut in the 2021 Swedish-language film adaptation of Vilhelm Moberg's The Emigrants.

=== 2022–present: Dirt Femme and Estrus ===
On 11 February 2022, Lo released the single "How Long" in promotion of the soundtrack to the second season of American teen drama Euphoria. On 3 May 2022 she launched her own label, Pretty Swede Records, with Mtheory. The same day, Lo released the single "No One Dies From Love" through Pretty Swede Records, marking her debut as an independent artist after being signed to Island Records since 2014. On 21 June 2022 she announced that her fifth studio album Dirt Femme would be released on 14 October 2022. The album contains both "How Long" and "No One Dies from Love" as well as the single "True Romance". The track "Cute & Cruel" features the Swedish band First Aid Kit. Another single from this album, "2 Die 4", was released on 29 July 2022, which samples the melody of the 1969 hit Popcorn.

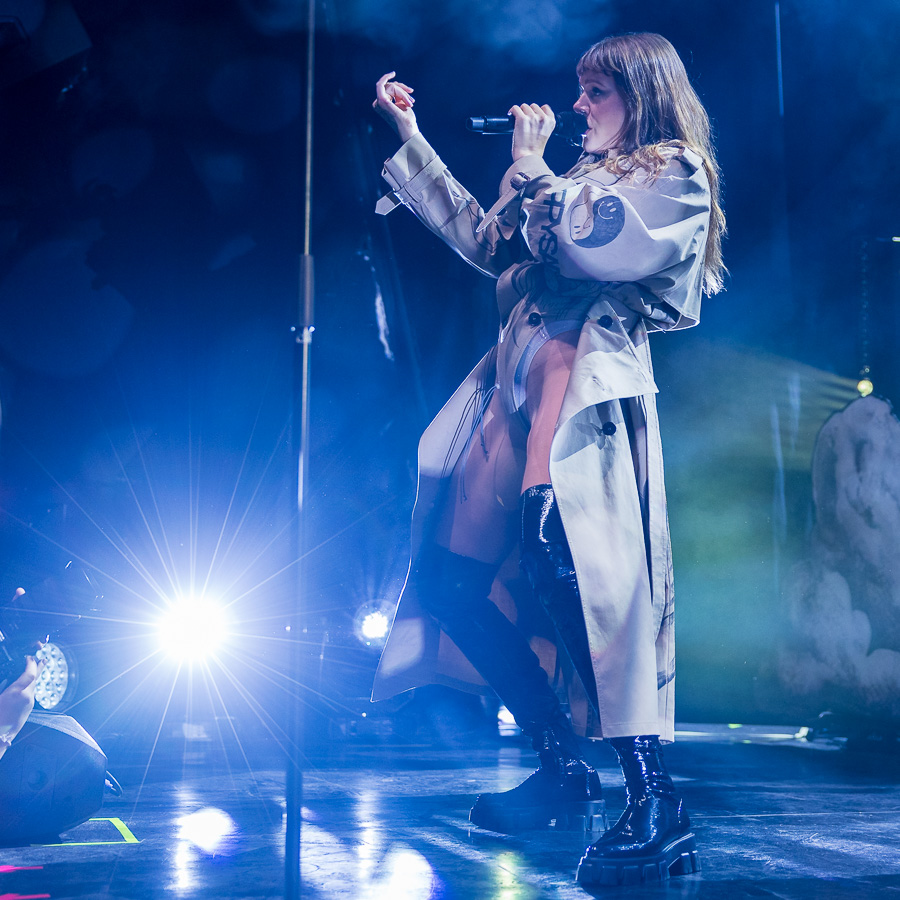
Tove Lo in November 2022

On 5 August 2022, Pussy Riot released their debut mixtape Matriarchy Now, executively produced by Lo. On 14 October 2022, she officially released Dirt Femme through Pretty Swede Records with overarching themes of body positivity, femininity, and addressing the "fears of losing herself". On 31 May 2023, Lo released the single "I Like U", which was followed on 21 July 2023 by an EP of remixes; the Emergency_Loop & Melanie C remix was released as a promotional single. To mark the 6 year anniversary of the release of her 2017 song Disco Tits, a remix by frequent collaborator Karma Fields was released on 7 September 2023.

In 2025, Lo confirmed she was working on her sixth studio album. In May 2026, Estrus was confirmed for release on 18 September 2026. Its lead single "I'm Your Girl Right?" was released on 13 May 2026.

On 10 November 2026 Lo released "Blood in Your Eyes", a song featured on Grand Theft Auto VI: The Album, which also appeared in the game's official Pre-Load Now trailer.

== Artistry ==
=== Musical style ===
"Talking Body"
from Queen of the Clouds illustrates Lo's soprano vocal range.

Music critics have described Lo's music as synth-pop, electropop, dance-pop, and indie pop, comparing her musical style to that of singers Kesha, Lorde, Robyn, and Katy Perry. Sasha Frere-Jones of The New Yorker describes Lo's sound as "of the moment: simple, spare, electronic, and unfussy". Her musical style is often described as dark, idiosyncratic and raw. Rolling Stone deemed her "Sweden's darkest pop export". Lo also has a soprano vocal range; Peter Robinson wrote, "As a vocalist she hints at euphoria and melancholy in equal measure". She has stated that her vocals are predominantly recorded from the first three takes of their demos to best convey her emotions. Her music uses a dynamic mix of prominent drum instrumentation, quiet verses and thunderous choruses indebted to the template of grunge music.

=== Songwriting ===
Described as "the world's most brutally honest pop star" by Alex Panisch of Out, Lo uses songwriting as a means of therapy for subjects she avoids speaking about. Her lyrics are primarily autobiographical, and are based mostly on mistakes, love, sex and failed relationships being characteristically direct, candid and complex. According to Tim Jonze of The Guardian, the singer tends to home in on "the more deranged side of love". Dubbed "the saddest girl in Sweden", Lo admits that her lyrics are predominantly sad because she is "useless" at writing tracks with a happier tone. Her lyrics have been noted to make subjects that are generally relegated to the genres of punk and hip hop more accessible in a pop framework.

Lo's debut EP, Truth Serum, documents one of her failed relationships in the order it took place. Queen of the Clouds, her debut studio album, is a concept album that describes the stages of her relationships in three sections: "The Sex", "The Love" and "The Pain". Jason Lipshutz of Billboard described the album as "blisteringly honest" and "unapologetically uncensored". Her second studio album, Lady Wood, talks about "different kinds of rushes in life" and is divided into two chapters, "Fairy Dust" and "Fire Fade". The singer's third studio record, Blue Lips, is a sequel to Lady Wood and is split into two chapters: "Light Beams" and "Pitch Black". Lo's lyrics often contain profanity and drug metaphors. Discussing the process of writing for other artists, the singer told Paste that she avoids drawing from her own experiences so that the songs do not become personal. She also said: "My main goal is to say something how they would say it, even if I might say it in a different way that makes more sense to me". In an interview with Coup De Main, Lo explained the songwriting process for her own songs:

Sometimes it starts with a random lyric idea that sets the tone for the whole song. Chords and sounds build from the lyric and rhythm, kind of. Sometimes it's a track I fall in love with... but writing my own songs, I rarely write on tracks. Then it's pretty much always 'the story' first. Then I add some chords and melody on my piano, or do a minimal production to get the sound right.

=== Influences ===
Lo grew up idolising Courtney Love and was inspired by grunge culture and the polarising lyrics of her music and her band, Hole. She also became fascinated with Love's romantic relationship with Kurt Cobain, as well as the rawness and honesty of his music with his band Nirvana. While in high school, Lo developed a passion for pop music and songwriting, influenced mainly by the output of Swedish singers Robyn and Lykke Li. She says the simplicity and quirky lyrics of French singer Charlotte Gainsbourg's album IRM (2009) is the main inspiration behind her career in music and said that it "opened a new world" for her sonically. She models her singing on the vocal stylings of Amy Winehouse, Jeff Buckley, and Mikky Ekko. Other artists she has cited as musical influences include Madonna, The Weeknd, and Silverchair.

== Personal life and public image ==
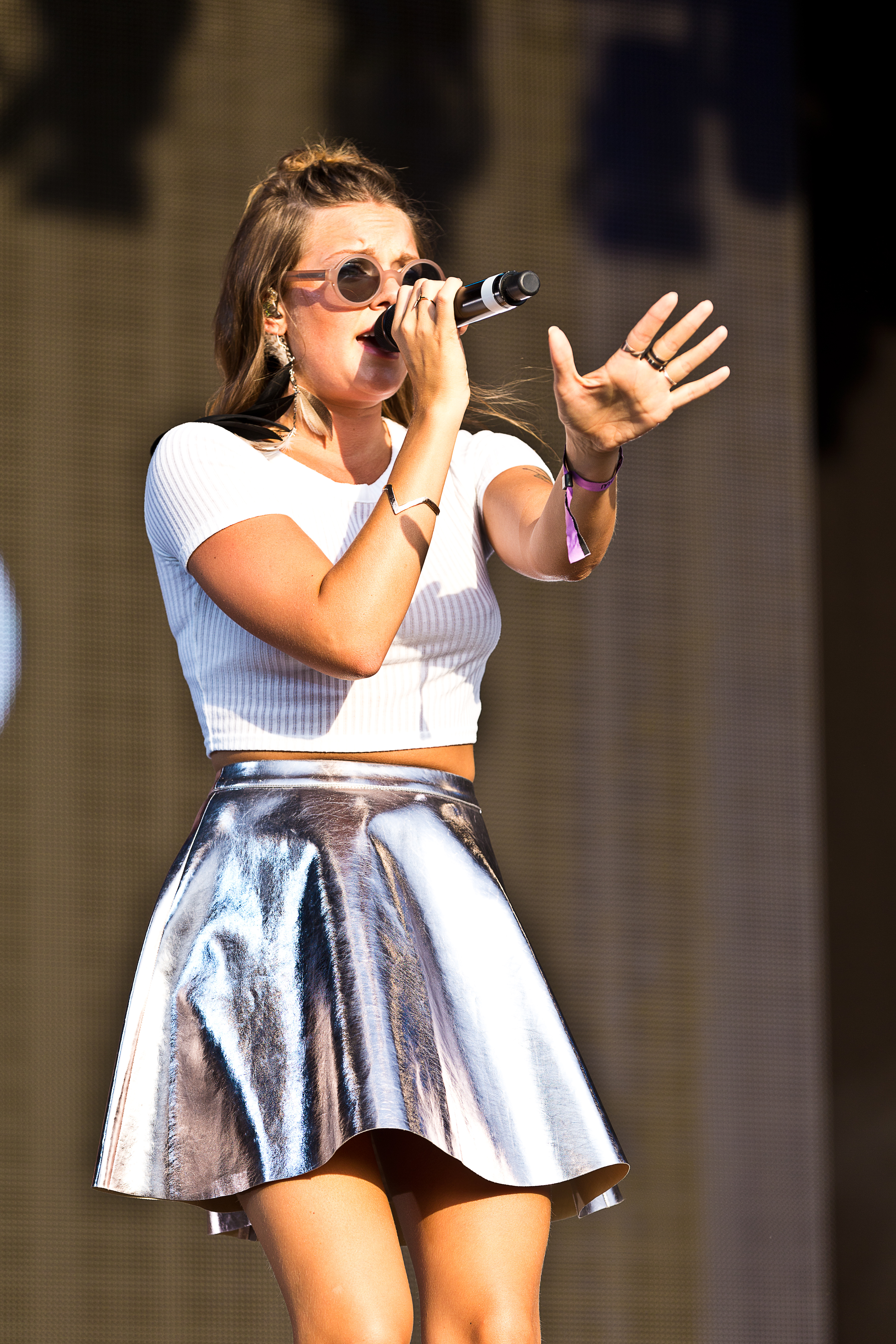
Lo performing at the 2015 Melt! Festival in Germany

An interview and profile of Tove Lo in W magazine in October 2016 referred to her as "openly bisexual", citing that as one of several identifiers "she once took for granted but are now very much part of her public persona". In an interview with Attitude in January 2017, Lo referred to her own bisexuality: "Being open and owning my sexuality in both ways-with both men and women - I think that's just never been a big deal", adding that she was very lucky growing up in a liberal country. In March the same year, she gave an interview with Out magazine, stating she had never been in a relationship with a woman. She referred to herself as pansexual in December 2022 in Paper Magazine. In 2026, she said "very much identifies as a bi or pan woman."

Lo says she created a media image for herself that is synonymous with her true identity. She has a prominent tattoo along her left upper arm of a girl harnessed to the back of a bumblebee. It is from the cover of Jack Off Jill's album Clear Hearts Grey Flowers; the album cover was designed by Mark Ryden. Frequently barefoot during her live performances, Lo's look is often compared to that of her style icon Janis Joplin. Her other style influences include hippie fashion, and the fashion of older rock singers, the people of Stockholm and Edie Sedgwick. According to Elle writer Rebecca Moss, Lo is "a true '90s child unwilling to part with her early iconography". Lindsey Rhoades of The Village Voice writes, "Tove Lo rocks a specific brand that veers slightly from most other women in pop-she paints herself as the hard-drinking, hard-drugging, DTF party girl, admitting the somewhat destructive nature of these preoccupations but celebrating them all the same." In 2014, Lo's first clothing line, which she also modelled, is based on the lyrics of her EP, Truth Serum.

Lo has voiced her frustration over censorship in the United States, including her lyrics, although she understands it is the only way to get her songs played on the radio. The artist has also commented that, "... in Sweden, we don't really censor that way. You hear every swear-word, in Swedish and English, on the radio, and kids will be singing along". The singer has often said in interviews that she is unapologetically proud of her body; she occasionally engages in exhibitionism at her shows, such as exposing her breasts while singing "Talking Body". "I started just by showing a little bit of boob or just being sassy, and everyone got so excited and then one night I just did it", she told MTV News at Bonnaroo. Lo is often asked about being a negative role model for women, given the many sexual and drug references in her lyrics. The artist has commented she finds it normal to talk about sex since she grew up in a country where that is considered "normal and not shameful", and many of her fans like the way she expresses herself. Lo also believes she receives these kinds of comments due to gender double standards, adding that: "I felt like I was getting asked all these questions because I'm a girl. ... It would be insulting to ask a guy that. Which it is to a girl as well." Lo identifies as a feminist in that she supports women's rights and gender equality, but also said that she is not a radical feminist.

On 26 July 2020, Lo announced on her Instagram story that she had married her New Zealand boyfriend, Charlie Twaddle.

As of 2026, Lo lives in Los Angeles.

== Discography ==
- Queen of the Clouds (2014)
- Lady Wood (2016)
- Blue Lips (2017)
- Sunshine Kitty (2019)
- Dirt Femme (2022)
- Estrus (2026)

== Filmography ==
=== Film ===
| Year | Film | Role | Notes |
|---|---|---|---|
| 2016 | Fairy Dust | Herself | Short film |
| 2017 | Fire Fade | Herself | Short film |
| 2018 | Blue Lips | Herself | Short film |
| 2021 | The Emigrants | Ulrika | |

=== Television ===
| Year | Series | Role | Notes |
|---|---|---|---|
| 2016 | Saturday Night Live | Performer | Season 41, episode: "Julia Louis-Dreyfus/Nick Jonas" |
| 2022 | RuPaul's Drag Race All Stars & Untucked! aftershow | Guest judge | Season 7, episode: "Total RuQuest Live" |
| 2024 | Twilight of the Gods | Jörmungandr (voice) | Episode: "The Scapegoat God" |

== Awards and nominations ==
After her commercial breakthrough, Lo has received many award nominations. She has earned six Grammis awards in her native Sweden, including Artist of the Year and Song of the Year for "Habits (Stay High)". Lo has also won four Scandipop Awards, which recognise the best music by artists from Nordic countries. As a songwriter of "Love Me like You Do" by Ellie Goulding, Lo received nominations for the Golden Globes, Grammys and Critics' Choice Awards. The singer has also been nominated for the MTV Europe Music Award for Best Swedish Act from 2014 to 2017.

| Award | Year | Nominee(s) | Category | Result | Ref. |
|---|---|---|---|---|---|
| APRA Music Awards | 2017 | "Say It" (with Flume) | Dance Work of the Year | Nominated | |
| APRA Music Awards | 2017 | "Say It" (with Flume) | Most Played Australian Work | Nominated | |
| APRA Music Awards | 2026 | "Cave" (with Dom Dolla) | Most Performed Dance/Electronic Work | Nominated | |
| American Music Awards | 2015 | Herself | New Artist of the Year | Nominated | |
| BMI London Awards | 2015 | "Habits (Stay High)" | Song of the Year | Nominated | |
| Berlin Music Video Awards | 2022 | "Pressure" (with Martin Garrix) | Best Cinematography | Nominated | |
| Berlin Music Video Awards | 2023 | "Grapefruit" | Best Performer | Nominated | |
| Berlin Music Video Awards | 2023 | "Borderline" | Best Narrative | Nominated | |
| Billboard Music Awards | 2015 | "Habits (Stay High)" | Top Streaming Song (Audio) | Nominated | |
| BreakTudo Awards | 2022 | "No One Dies from Love" | International Music Video | Nominated | |
| Buenos Aires Music Video Festival | 2022 | "No One Dies from Love" | Video of the Year | Nominated | |
| Buenos Aires Music Video Festival | 2022 | "No One Dies from Love" | Best Director | Nominated | |
| Buenos Aires Music Video Festival | 2022 | "No One Dies from Love" | Best VFX | Nominated | |
| Buenos Aires Music Video Festival | 2022 | "No One Dies from Love" | Best Art Direction | Won | |
| Camerimage | 2023 | "Borderline" | Best Music Video | Nominated | |
| Capricho Awards | 2015 | Herself | New Artist | Won | |
| Critics' Choice Awards | 2016 | "Love Me like You Do" | Best Song | Nominated | |
| D&AD Awards | 2023 | "No One Dies from Love" | Narrative | Nominated | |
| D&AD Awards | 2023 | "No One Dies from Love" | Production Design | Nominated | |
| Danish Music Awards | 2015 | Queen of the Clouds | Best International Album | Nominated | |
| Electronic Dance Music Awards | 2025 | "Cave" (with Dom Dolla) | DnB (Drum and Bass) Song of the Year | Nominated | |
| European Border Breakers Award | 2015 | Queen of the Clouds | Sweden Album Of The Year | Won | |
| Denmark GAFFA Awards | 2020 | Herself | Best Foreign Solo Act | Nominated | |
| Denmark GAFFA Awards | 2020 | Sunshine Kitty | Best Foreign Album | Nominated | |
| GLAAD Media Awards | 2025 | Heat | Outstanding Music Artist | Nominated | |
| Gay Music Chart Awards | 2015 | "Timebomb" | Best Swedish Music Video | Nominated | |
| Gay Times Honours 500 | 2022 | Herself | International Excellence in Music | Won | |
| Gold Derby Awards | 2016 | "Love Me like You Do" | Best Original Song | Nominated | |
| Golden Globe Awards | 2016 | "Love Me like You Do" | Best Original Song | Nominated | |
| Grammis | 2015 | Herself | Artist of the Year | Won | |
| Grammis | 2015 | "Habits (Stay High)" | Song of the Year | Won | |
| Grammis | 2015 | Queen of the Clouds | Pop of the Year | Nominated | |
| Grammis | 2017 | Herself | Artist of the Year | Nominated | |
| Grammis | 2017 | Lady Wood | Pop of the Year | Nominated | |
| Grammis | 2018 | Herself | Artist of the Year | Nominated | |
| Grammis | 2018 | Blue Lips | Album of the Year | Nominated | |
| Grammis | 2018 | Blue Lips | Pop of the Year | Won | |
| Grammis | 2018 | Herself | Lyricist of the Year | Won | |
| Grammis | 2020 | Sunshine Kitty | Album of the Year | Nominated | |
| Grammis | 2020 | Sunshine Kitty | Pop of the Year | Nominated | |
| Grammis | 2023 | Dirt Femme | Pop of the Year | Nominated | |
| Grammis | 2023 | Dirt Femme | Album of the Year | Won | |
| Grammis | 2023 | Herself | Artist of the Year | Won | |
| Grammis | 2023 | Herself | Lyricist of the Year | Nominated | |
| Grammy Awards | 2016 | "Love Me like You Do" | Best Song Written for Visual Media | Nominated | |
| Grammy Awards | 2020 | "Glad He's Gone" | Best Music Video | Nominated | |
| Guild of Music Supervisors Awards | 2016 | "Love Me like You Do" | Best Song/Recording Created for a Film | Nominated | |
| Hollywood Music in Media Awards | 2016 | "Scars" | Best Original Song in a SciFi Movie | Nominated | |
| Houston Film Critics Society | 2016 | "Love Me like You Do" | Best Original Song | Nominated | |
| International Dance Music Awards | 2015 | "Heroes (We Could Be)" | Best Electro/Progressive House Track | Nominated | |
| International Dance Music Awards | 2015 | "Heroes (We Could Be)" | Best Featured Vocalist Performance | Nominated | |
| International Online Cinema Awards | 2016 | "Love Me like You Do" | Best Original Song | Won | |
| iHeartRadio Music Awards | 2015 | "Habits (Stay High)" | Best Lyrics | Nominated | |
| iHeartRadio Music Awards | 2016 | Herself | Best New Artist | Nominated | |
| MTV Europe Music Awards | 2014 | Herself | Best Swedish Act | Nominated | |
| MTV Europe Music Awards | 2015 | Herself | Best Swedish Act | Nominated | |
| MTV Europe Music Awards | 2016 | Herself | Best Swedish Act | Nominated | |
| MTV Europe Music Awards | 2017 | Herself | Best Swedish Act | Nominated | |
| MTV Europe Music Awards | 2022 | Herself | Best Nordic Act | Nominated | |
| Melty Future Awards | 2017 | Herself | Prix Spécial International Féminin | Won | |
| Musikexportpriset | 2015 | Herself | Music Export Award | Won | |
| Musikexportpriset | 2023 | Herself | Music Export Award | Nominated | |
| Musikförläggarnas Pris | 2014 | Herself | Breakthrough of the Year | Nominated | |
| Musikförläggarnas Pris | 2015 | Herself | Composer of the Year | Nominated | |
| Musikförläggarnas Pris | 2015 | Herself | Lyricist of the Year | Nominated | |
| Musikförläggarnas Pris | 2015 | Herself | International Success | Won | |
| Musikförläggarnas Pris | 2015 | Herself | Breakthrough of the Year | Won | |
| Musikförläggarnas Pris | 2015 | "Love Me like You Do" | Best Song | Won | |
| Musikförläggarnas Pris | 2015 | "Love Me like You Do" | Most Played Song of the Year | Won | |
| Musikförläggarnas Pris | 2017 | Herself | Composer of the Year | Nominated | |
| Musikförläggarnas Pris | 2017 | Herself | Lyricist of the Year | Nominated | |
| Musikförläggarnas Pris | 2023 | "No One Dies from Love" | Best Song | Nominated | |
| Music Video Festival | 2019 | "Glad He's Gone" | Best Music Video | Nominated | |
| Music Video Festival | 2020 | "Are U Gonna Tell Her?" | Best Music Video | Won | |
| Music Video Festival | 2023 | "No One Dies from Love" | Best Music Video | Nominated | |
| Music Video Festival | 2023 | "No One Dies from Love" | Best Direction | Nominated | |
| mtvU Woodie Awards | 2015 | "Heroes (We Could Be)" | Co-Sign Woodie | Nominated | |
| NME Awards | 2017 | Herself | Best International Female | Nominated | |
| NME Awards | 2017 | "Cool Girl" | Best Track | Nominated | |
| P3 Gold Awards | 2015 | Herself | Newcomer of the Year | Won | |
| P3 Gold Awards | 2015 | Herself | Artist of the Year | Nominated | |
| P3 Gold Awards | 2015 | "Stay High" | Song of the Year | Nominated | |
| P3 Gold Awards | 2017 | Herself | Artist of the Year | Nominated | |
| P3 Gold Awards | 2020 | Herself | Artist of the Year | Nominated | |
| P3 Gold Awards | 2023 | Herself | Artist of the Year | Nominated | |
| P3 Gold Awards | 2023 | Dirt Femme | Album of the Year | Nominated | |
| P3 Gold Awards | 2023 | "No One Dies from Love" | Song of the Year | Nominated | |
| Scandipop Awards | 2014 | "Habits" | Best Song from a New Artist | Nominated | |
| Scandipop Awards | 2015 | Herself | Best Female | Won | |
| Scandipop Awards | 2015 | Queen of the Clouds | Best Album | Won | |
| Scandipop Awards | 2015 | "Talking Body" | Best Alternapop | Won | |
| Scandipop Awards | 2016 | "Moments" | Best Video | Nominated | |
| Scandipop Awards | 2017 | Lady Wood | Best Album | Nominated | |
| Scandipop Awards | 2017 | "True Disaster" | Best Electropop Song | Won | |
| Scandipop Awards | 2017 | Herself | Global Superstar of 2016 | Nominated | |
| Scandipop Awards | 2017 | Herself | Social Hero of the Year | Nominated | |
| Scandipop Awards | 2018 | Herself | Best Female | Nominated | |
| Scandipop Awards | 2018 | Blue Lips | Best Album | Nominated | |
| Scandipop Awards | 2020 | Sunshine Kitty | Best Album | Nominated | |
| Scandipop Awards | 2020 | Herself | Best Female | Nominated | |
| Scandipop Awards | 2023 | Herself | Artist of the Year | Nominated | |
| Scandipop Awards | 2023 | Dirt Femme | Album of the Year | Nominated | |
| Scandipop Awards | 2023 | "No One Dies from Love" | Song of the Year | Won | |
| Scandipop Awards | 2023 | "2 Die 4" | Banger of the Year | Nominated | |
| Pop Awards | 2023 | Herself | Female Artist of the Year | Nominated | |
| Queerty Awards | 2025 | "Heat" (with SG Lewis) | Best Music Video | Nominated | |
| Rockbjörnen | 2015 | Herself | Breakthrough of the Year | Won | |
| STIM | 2015 | Herself | Platinagitarren | Won | |
| Sweden GAFFA Awards | 2014 | Herself | Best Sweden Breakthrough | Won | |
| Teen Choice Awards | 2015 | Herself | Choice Music: Breakout Artist | Nominated | |
| Teen Choice Awards | 2016 | "Close" | Choice Music Single: Male | Nominated | |
| Teen Choice Awards | 2016 | "Close" | Choice Music – Love Song | Nominated | |
| Video Prisma Awards | 2023 | "Borderline" | Video of the Year | Nominated | |
| Video Prisma Awards | 2023 | "Borderline" | Best Narration | Nominated | |
| Video Prisma Awards | 2023 | "Borderline" | Best Sci-Fi | Nominated | |
| Video Prisma Awards | 2023 | "Borderline" | Best Art Direction International | Won | |
| UK Music Video Awards | 2019 | Blue Lips | Best Special Video Project | Nominated | |
| UK Music Video Awards | 2019 | "Glad He's Gone" | Best Pop Video – International | Nominated | |
| UK Music Video Awards | 2019 | "Glad He's Gone" | Best Visual Effects | Nominated | |
| UK Music Video Awards | 2020 | "Are U Gonna Tell Her?" | Best Pop Video – International | Nominated | |
| UK Music Video Awards | 2020 | "Are U Gonna Tell Her?" | Best Choreography in a Video | Nominated | |
| UK Music Video Awards | 2022 | "No One Dies from Love" | Best Pop Video - International | Nominated | |
| UK Music Video Awards | 2022 | "No One Dies from Love" | Best Production Design in a Video | Nominated | |
| UK Music Video Awards | 2023 | "Borderline" | Best Pop Video - International | Nominated | |
| UK Music Video Awards | 2026 | "I'm Your Girl Right?" | Best Pop Video - International | Pending | |
| UK Music Video Awards | 2026 | "I'm Your Girl Right?" | Best Styling in a Video | Pending | |
| UK Music Video Awards | 2026 | "I'm Your Girl Right?" | Best Cinematography in a Video | Pending | |
| YouTube Music Awards | 2015 | Herself | 50 Artists to Watch | Won | |

== Tours ==
Headlining

- Queen of the Clouds Tour (2015)
- Lady Wood Tour (2017)
- Sunshine Kitty Tour (2019–2020)
- Dirt Femme Tour (2022–2023)
- Estrus Tour (2026–2027)

Supporting

- Katy Perry – Prismatic World Tour (2014)
- Maroon 5 – Maroon V Tour (2016)
- Coldplay – A Head Full of Dreams Tour (2017)
- Dua Lipa – Future Nostalgia Tour (2022)

== See also ==
- Swedish pop music
