= List of songs written by Tove Lo =

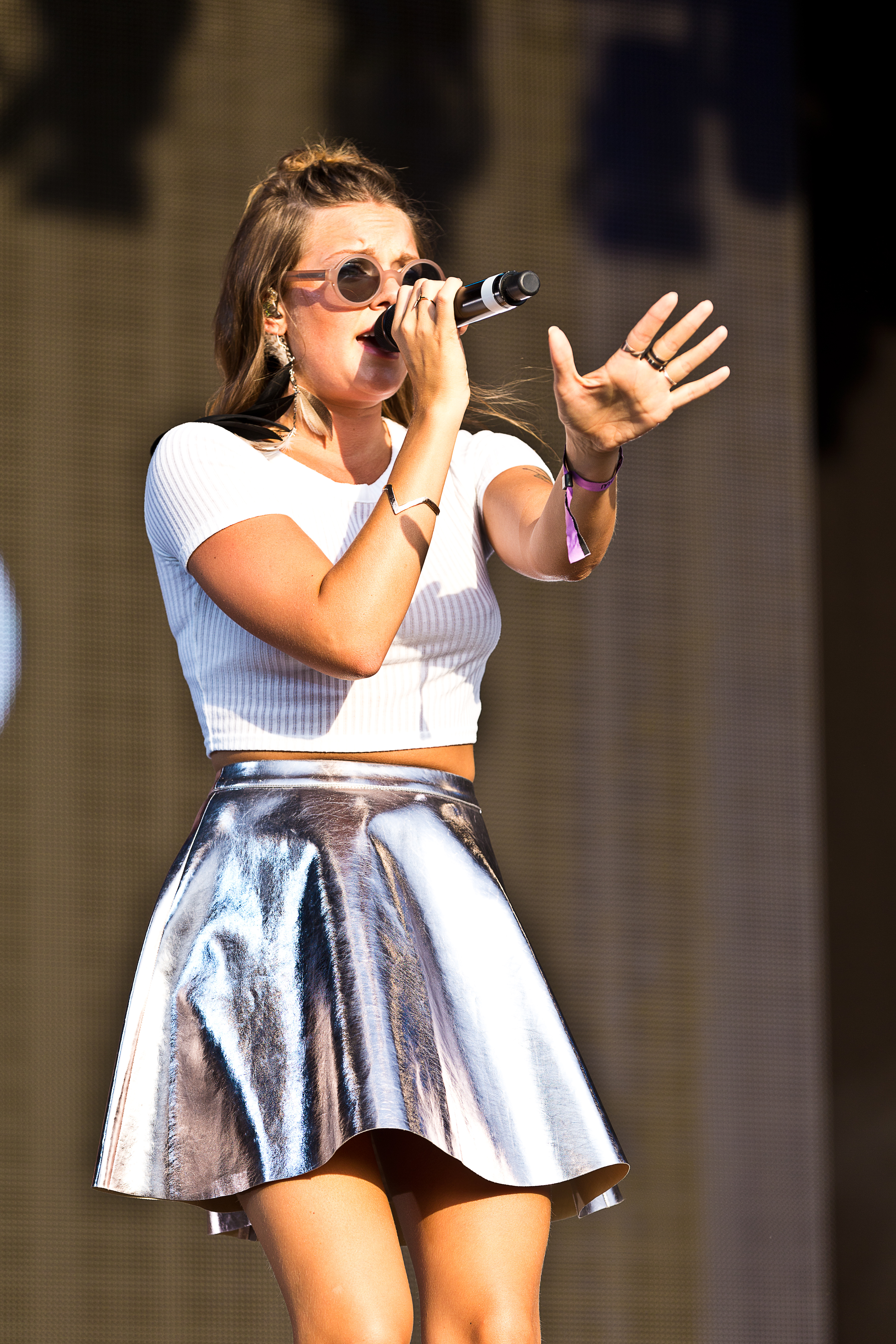
Tove Lo performing at the 2015 Melt! Festival in Gräfenhainichen, Germany

Swedish singer and songwriter Tove Lo has written over 70 songs for her five studio albums and one extended play, as well as for other artists. Between 2006 and 2009, Lo was a member of math rock band Tremblebee, and wrote the lyrics for their songs. In 2011, she signed a publishing deal with Warner/Chappell Music, and later joined songwriting teams Xenomania and Wolf Cousins. In 2014, Lo wrote and provided vocals for "Heroes (We Could Be)" by Swedish musician Alesso, which peaked inside the top ten in Sweden and the United Kingdom. Lo co-wrote "Love Me Like You Do", recorded by English singer Ellie Goulding, which was released as the second single from the soundtrack to the film Fifty Shades of Grey (2015). The track topped the UK Singles Chart and peaked at number three on the Billboard Hot 100. Additionally, Lo received nominations, alongside the others co-writers of the song, for the Golden Globes, Grammys and Critics' Choice Awards. Discussing the process of writing for other artists, the singer told Paste that she avoids drawing from her own experiences so that the songs do not become personal. She also stated: "My main goal is to say something how they would say it, even if I might say it in a different way that makes more sense to me".

In addition to her work for other artists, Lo has co-written the songs from her own record releases. While writing for other singers, she started to record the songs she deemed too personal to give away; the first one was "Love Ballad", which was initially offered to an artist who wanted to change the lyrics. The track became her first collaboration with co-writers Jakob Jerlström and Ludvig Söderberg, better known as The Struts, and was later released as Lo's debut single in October 2012. "Habits", also co-written with The Struts, was released as the singer's second single in March 2013. It was written during 2012's Hurricane Sandy in New York, and was inspired by Lo's attempts to forget a former boyfriend through substance abuse and other hedonistic practices. Its popularity among music blogs gained the artist a recording contract with Universal Music Group.

In March 2014, Lo released her first EP Truth Serum, a concept record that details her "most intense" failed relationship. It contains six tracks co-written by the singer alongside The Struts and Alx Reuterskiöld, among others. In September of that year, the artist released her debut studio album, Queen of the Clouds, a concept album divided into three sections that describes the pattern of her relationships: The Sex, The Love and The Pain. The majority of the tracks were co-written by Lo alongside The Struts. "Habits" was re-released as "Habits (Stay High)" as both the second single from Truth Serum and the lead single from Queen of the Clouds, and became a commercial success, peaking at number three on the Billboard Hot 100. It was also awarded the Song of the Year accolade at the 2015 Grammis Awards in Sweden.

In October 2016, Lo released her second studio album, Lady Wood, which talks about "different kinds of rushes in life" and is divided into two chapters, "Fairy Dust" and "Fire Fade". It featured ten songs co-written by the artist alongside The Struts, Ilya Salmanzadeh and Oscar Holter, among others. In November 2017, the singer released her third studio album, Blue Lips, which is a sequel to Lady Wood and is also split into two chapters: "Light Beams" and "Pitch Black". For the record, she worked mostly with The Struts and Ali Payami. Lo has also written and recorded tracks for the soundtracks of three films. She solely wrote and produced "Scream My Name" for the soundtrack to the 2014 film The Hunger Games: Mockingjay – Part 1. She wrote "Scars" alongside The Struts, which became the lead single of the soundtrack to the 2016 film The Divergent Series: Allegiant. Lo also co-wrote "Lies in the Dark", which is part of the soundtrack to Fifty Shades Darker (2017).

== Songs ==
Key
| † | Indicates single release |
| # | Indicates promotional single release |
| ‡ | Indicates a song written solely by Lo |

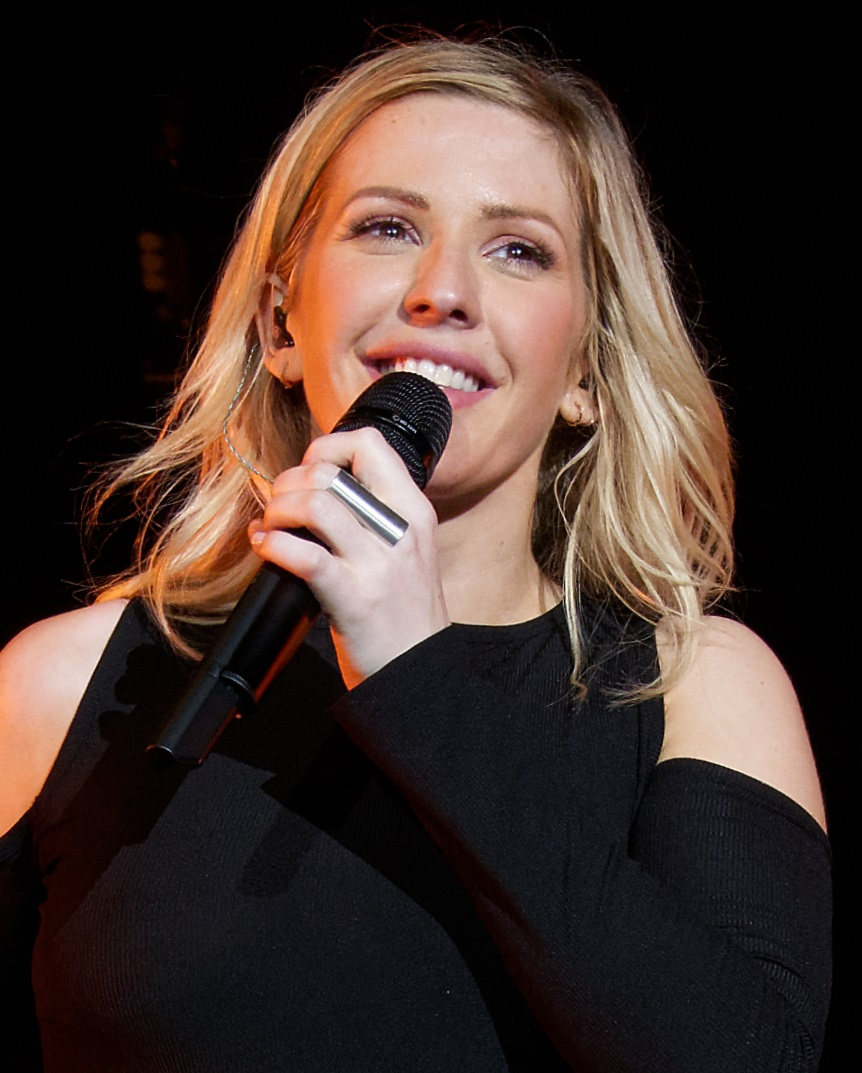
Lo co-wrote "Love Me Like You Do", recorded by English singer Ellie Goulding (pictured) for the soundtrack to the film Fifty Shades of Grey (2015).

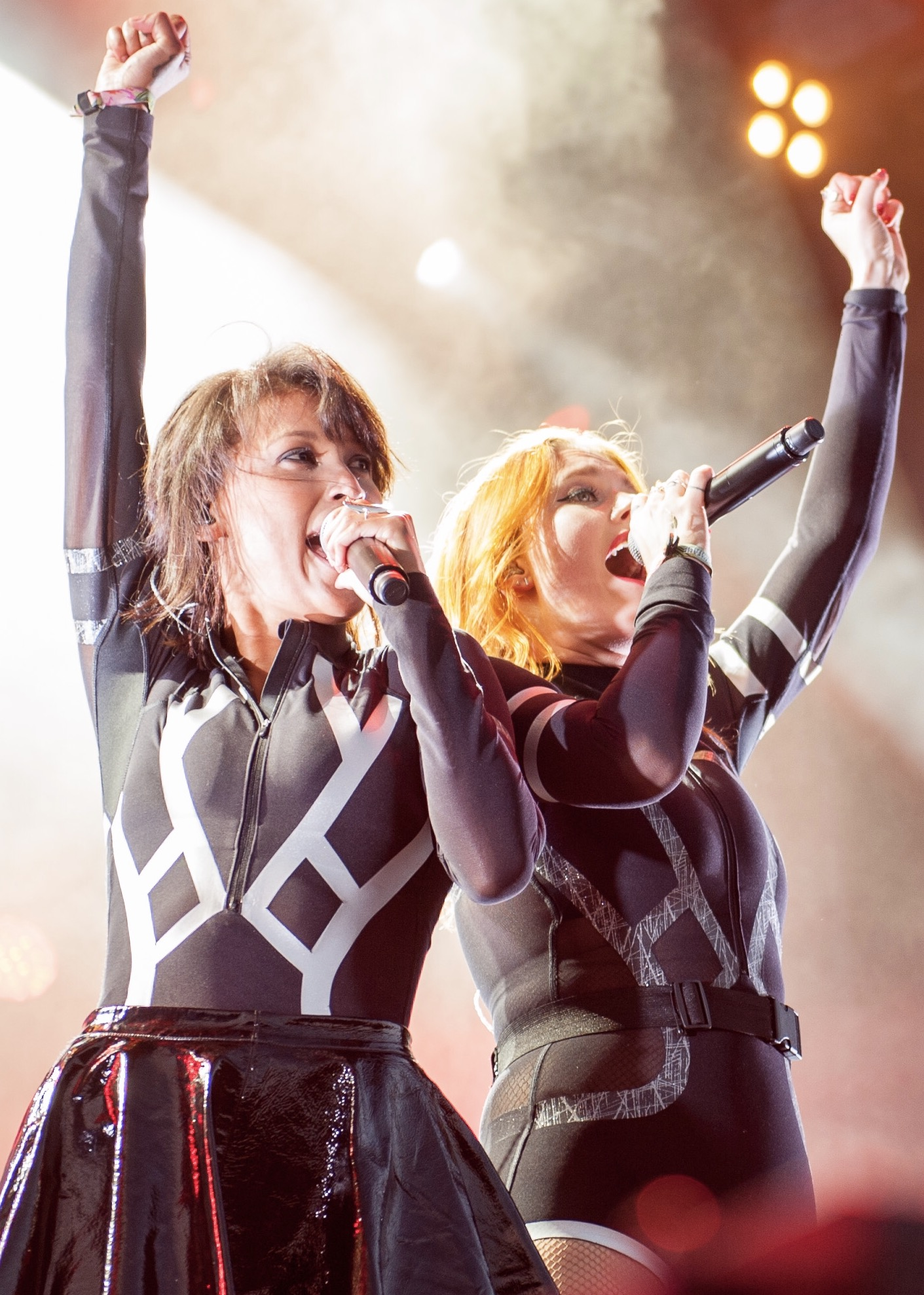
Lo co-wrote three songs for Swedish duo Icona Pop (pictured), including the single "We Got the World" (2012).

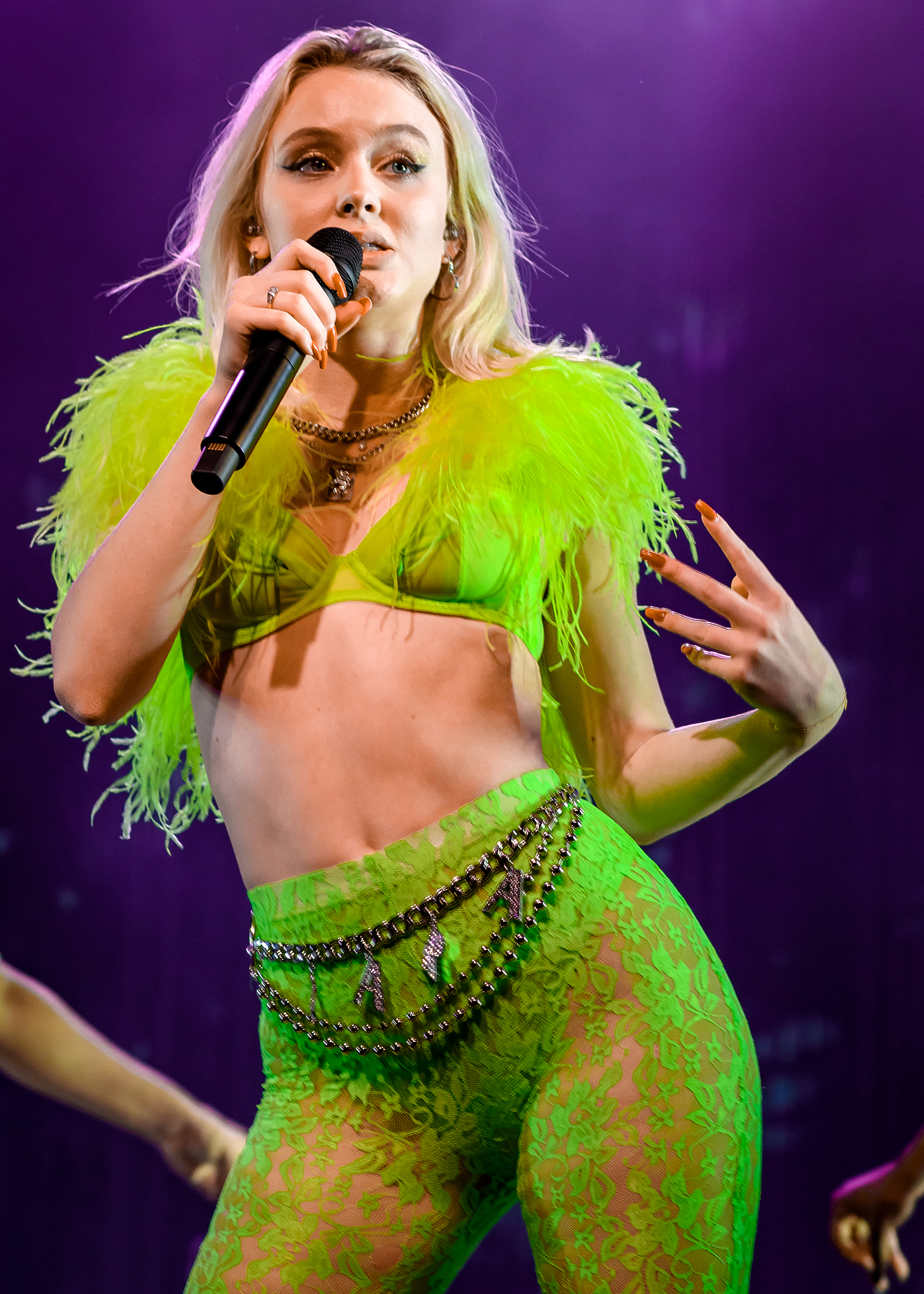
Lo co-wrote the single "Don't Worry Bout Me" (2019) for Zara Larsson (pictured).

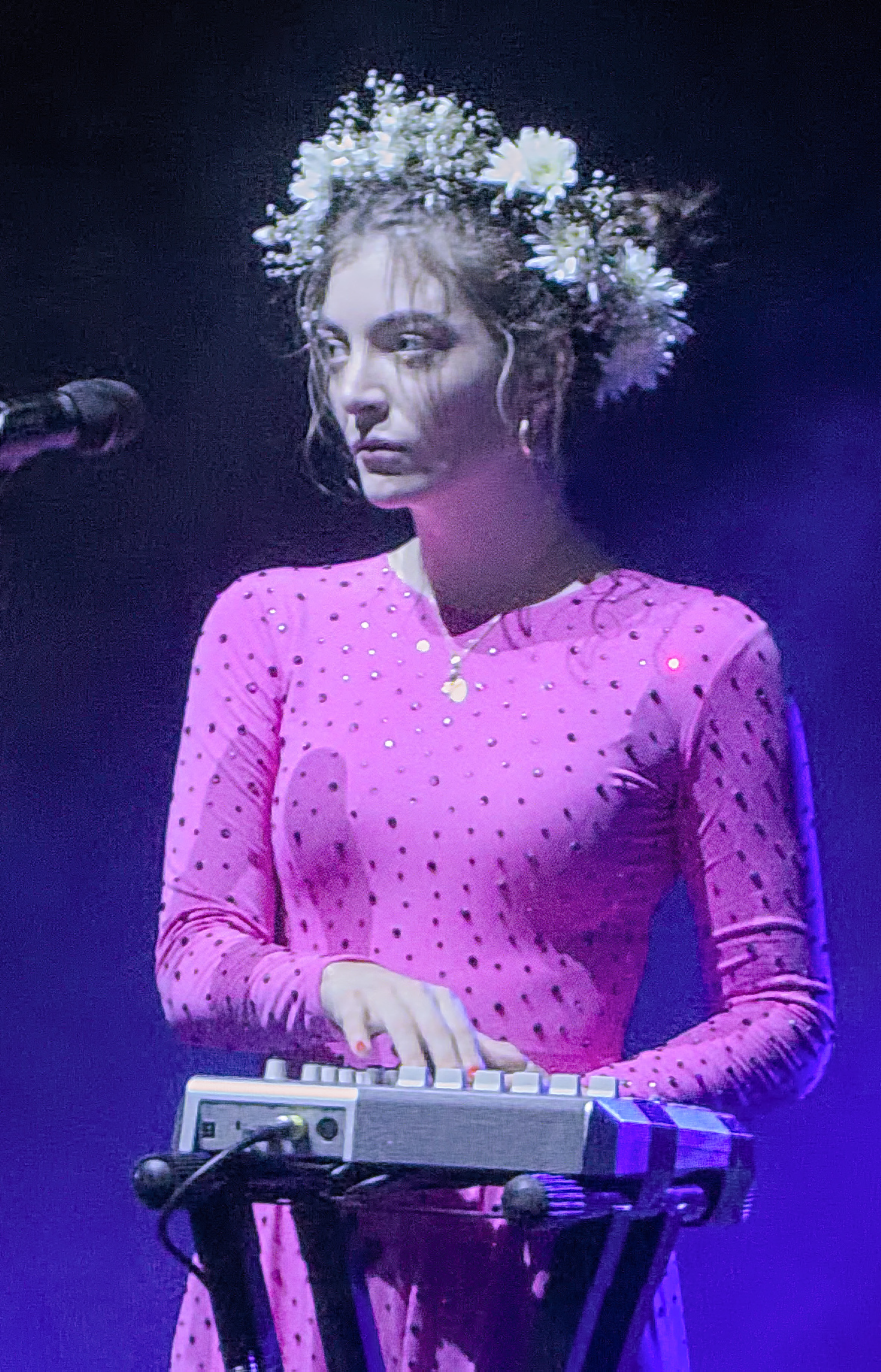
Lo co-wrote "Homemade Dynamite" with Lorde (pictured) for her sophomore LP, Melodrama (2017).

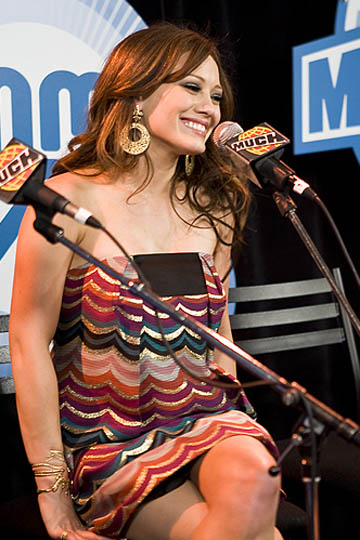
Lo wrote several songs for Hilary Duff's album Breathe In. Breathe Out. (2015).

| Title | Artist(s) | Songwriter(s) | Album(s) | Year | Ref. |
|---|---|---|---|---|---|
| "2 Die 4" † | Tove Lo | Tove Lo; Oscar Görres; Gershon Kingsley | Dirt Femme | 2022 | |
| "9th of October" | Tove Lo | Tove Lo; Ludvig Söderberg; Jakob Jerlström | Blue Lips | 2017 | |
| "Anywhere U Go" | Tove Lo | Tove Lo; Ludvig Söderberg; Svante Halldin; Jakob Hazell | Sunshine Kitty | 2019 | |
| "Are U Gonna Tell Her?" | Tove Lo featuring MC Zaac | Tove Lo; Ludvig Söderberg; Jakob Jerlström; Isaac Daniel; Umberto Tavares; Jefferson Junior | Sunshine Kitty | 2019 | |
| "Attention Whore" | Tove Lo featuring Channel Tres | Tove Lo; Ludvig Söderberg; Jerome Castille; Sheldon Young | Dirt Femme | 2022 | |
| "Bad as the Boys" † | Tove Lo featuring Alma | Tove Lo; Ludvig Söderberg; Jakob Jerlström | Sunshine Kitty | 2019 | |
| "Bad Days" | Tove Lo | Tove Lo; Gustav Weber Vernet | Blue Lips | 2017 | |
| "Better Days" † | Liam Gallagher | Liam Gallagher; Andrew Wyatt; Gustav Weber Vernet; Michael Tighe; Tove Lo | C'mon You Know | 2022 | |
| "Bikini Porn" † | Tove Lo | Tove Lo; Finneas O'Connell; Jakob Hazell; Svante Halldin; Ludvig Söderberg | Sunshine Kitty (Paw Prints Edition) | 2020 | |
| "Bitches" | Tove Lo | Tove Lo; Ali Payami | Blue Lips | 2017 | |
| "Blow That Smoke" † | Major Lazer featuring Tove Lo | Maxime Picard; Phillip Meckseper; Tove Lo; Clement Picard; Jakob Jerlström; Ludvig Söderberg; Sibel Redžep; Thomas Wesley Pentz | Major Lazer Essentials | 2018 | |
| "Borderline" † | Tove Lo | Tove Lo; Dua Lipa; Jakob Jerlström; Ludvig Söderberg | Dirt Femme | 2023 | |
| "Bumble Bee" | Unknown | Tove Lo; Mike Riley | Non-album song | Unknown | |
| "Busy Girl" | SG Lewis and Tove Lo | Tove Lo; Samuel George Lewis; Orlando Higginbottom | Heat | 2024 | |
| "Call Me Tonight" | Ava Max | Amanda Ava Koci; Tove Lo; Johan Schuster; Henry Walter | Heaven & Hell | 2020 | |
| "Call on Me" † | Tove Lo and SG Lewis | Tove Lo; Samuel George Lewis; Orlando Higginbottom | Dirt Femme and AudioLust & HigherLove | 2022 | |
| "Cave" † | Dom Dolla and Tove Lo | Dominic Matheson; Tove Lo | Non-album single | 2024 | |
| "Close" † | Nick Jonas featuring Tove Lo | Mattias Larsson Robin Fredriksson; Julia Michaels; Justin Tranter; Tove Lo | Last Year Was Complicated | 2016 | |
| "Colorblind" † | Karma Fields featuring Tove Lo | Timothy Nelson; Tove Lo | Body Rush | 2018 | |
| "Come Back to Me" † | Urban Cone featuring Tove Lo | Rasmus Flyckt; Tim Formgren; Emil Gustafsson; Jacob Sjöberg; Magnus Folkö; Tove Lo | Polaroid Memories | 2015 | |
| "Come Undone" | Tove Lo | Tove Lo; Ludvig Söderberg; Svante Halldin; Jakob Hazell | Sunshine Kitty | 2019 | |
| "Cool" | Dua Lipa | Dua Lipa; Tove Lo; Camille Purcell; Shakka Philip; Benjamin Kohn; Thomas Barnes; Peter Kelleher | Future Nostalgia | 2020 | |
| "Cool Girl" † | Tove Lo | Tove Lo; Jakob Jerlström; Ludvig Söderberg | Lady Wood | 2016 | |
| "Crave" | Tove Lo | Tove Lo; Ryan Rabin; Ryan McMahon; Ben Berger | Queen of the Clouds | 2014 | |
| "Cute & Cruel" | Tove Lo featuring First Aid Kit | Tove Lo; Elvira Anderfjärd | Dirt Femme | 2022 | |
| "Cycles" | Tove Lo | Tove Lo; Ludvig Söderberg; Jakob Jerlström; Joe Janiak | Blue Lips | 2017 | |
| "Desire" † | Years & Years featuring Tove Lo | Olly Alexander; Michael Goldsworthy; Emre Turkmen; Kid Harpoon; Tove Lo | Communion (deluxe edition) | 2016 | |
| "Desire" | SG Lewis and Tove Lo | Tove Lo; Samuel George Lewis | Heat | 2024 | |
| "Disco Tits" † | Tove Lo | Tove Lo; Jakob Jerlström; Ludvig Söderberg | Blue Lips | 2017 | |
| "Diva" † | Aazar featuring Swae Lee and Tove Lo | Aazar; Nicolas Petitfrère; SeySey Compositeur; Khalif Malik Ibn Shaman Brown; Tove Lo | TBA | 2019 | |
| "Don't Ask Don't Tell" | Tove Lo | Tove Lo; Ali Payami | Blue Lips | 2017 | |
| "Don't Say Goodbye" † | Alok and Ilkay Sencan featuring Tove Lo | Hannah Wilson; Alex Cotoi; Alok; Tove Lo; Illkay Sencan; OHYES; Robert Uhlmann | TBA | 2020 | |
| "Don't Talk About It" | Tove Lo | Tove Lo; Ilya Salmanzadeh; Rickard Göransson | Lady Wood | 2016 | |
| "Don't Worry Bout Me" † | Zara Larsson | Tove Lo; Zara Larsson; Ludvig Söderberg; Jakob Jerlström; Rami Yacoub; Linnea Södahl; Whitney Phillips | Poster Girl | 2019 | |
| "Elevator Eyes" † | Tove Lo | Tove Lo; Joel Little | Dirt Femme | 2023 | |
| "End of It All" | Mat Sherman | Tove Lo; Mat Sherman; Wes Jones | Non-album song | Unknown | |
| "Equally Lost" | Tove Lo featuring Doja Cat | Tove Lo; Mattias Larsson; Robin Fredriksson; Amalaratna Dlamini; Max Martin | Sunshine Kitty | 2019 | |
| "Flashes" | Tove Lo | Tove Lo; Oscar Görres | Lady Wood | 2016 | |
| "Forget It" | Amanda Fondell | Tove Lo; Fredrik Samsson; Amanda Fondell | Because I Am | 2014 | |
| "Freak of Nature" | Broods featuring Tove Lo | Georgia Nott; Caleb Nott; Tove Lo | Conscious | 2016 | |
| "Give It All Up" † | Duran Duran featuring Tove Lo | Simon Le Bon; John Taylor; Roger Taylor; Nick Rhodes; Graham Coxon; Erol Alkan; Tove Lo | Future Past | 2021 | |
| "Glad He's Gone" † | Tove Lo | Tove Lo; Jakob Jerlström; Ludvig Söderberg; Karl "Shellback" Schuster | Sunshine Kitty | 2019 | |
| "Gold" † | Victoria Justice | Tove Lo; Jason Weiss; Sam Shrieve; Ben Camp; Jakob Jerlström; Ludvig Söderberg | Non-album song | 2013 | |
| "Good Guys" | Unknown | Tove Lo; Michael Abiola Orabiyi; Elliot Wilkins | Non-album song | Unknown | |
| "Got Love" # | Tove Lo | Tove Lo; Alx Reuterskiöld; Jakob Jerlström; Ludvig Söderberg | Queen of the Clouds | 2014 | |
| "Grapefruit" † | Tove Lo | Tove Lo; Ludvig Söderberg; Timothy Nelson | Dirt Femme | 2022 | |
| "Gritty Pretty (Intro)" | Tove Lo | Tove Lo; Jakob Jerlström; Ludvig Söderberg | Sunshine Kitty | 2019 | |
| "Habits (Stay High)" † | Tove Lo | Tove Lo; Jakob Jerlström; Ludvig Söderberg | Truth Serum; Queen of the Clouds | 2013 | |
| "Heart Attack" † | Phoebe Ryan featuring Tove Lo | Phoebe Ryan; Tove Lo; Tommy English; Imad Royal | NGX: Ten Years of Neon Gold | 2018 | |
| "Heat" † | SG Lewis and Tove Lo | Tove Lo; Samuel George Lewis; Orlando Higginbottom | Heat | 2024 | |
| "Heroes (We Could Be)" † | Alesso featuring Tove Lo | Alessandro Lindblad; Tove Lo; David Bowie; Brian Eno | Forever | 2014 | |
| "Hey You Got Drugs?" | Tove Lo | Tove Lo; Alex Hope | Blue Lips | 2017 | |
| "Homemade Dynamite" | Lorde | Tove Lo; Ella Yelich-O'Connor; Ludvig Söderberg; Jakob Jerlström | Melodrama | 2017 | |
| "How Long" † | Tove Lo | Tove Lo; Ludvig Söderberg; Sibel Redžep; Tim Nelson | Euphoria Season 2 (An HBO Original Series Soundtrack) and Dirt Femme | 2022 | |
| "How'd You Do It" | Unknown | Tove Lo; Jarl Aanestad | Non-album song | Unknown | |
| "I Like U" † | Tove Lo | Tove Lo; Timothy Nelson | Dirt Femme | 2023 | |
| "I'm Coming" † | Tove Lo | Veronica Maggio; Christian Walz; Stefan Olsson; Tove Lo | Sunshine Kitty (Paw Prints Edition) | 2020 | |
| "I'm to Blame" # | Tove Lo | Tove Lo; Ali Payami | Dirt Femme | 2022 | |
| "Imaginary Friend" | Tove Lo | Tove Lo; Ludvig Söderberg; Jakob Jerlström; Joel Little | Lady Wood | 2016 | |
| "In My Head" | Unknown | Tove Lo; Alx Reuterskiöld; Kim Andreas Wennerstrom | Non-album song | Unknown | |
| "Influence" # | Tove Lo featuring Wiz Khalifa | Tove Lo; Ludvig Söderberg; Jakob Jerlström; Cameron Jibril Thomaz | Lady Wood | 2016 | |
| "Jacques" † | Jax Jones and Tove Lo | Tove Lo; Timucin Aluo; Mark Ralph | Sunshine Kitty; Snacks (Supersize) | 2019 | |
| "Jealousy" | Tal | Mattias Larsson; Robin Fredriksson; Tove Lo; Jason Gill | Non-album song | 2013 | |
| "Keep It Simple" | Tove Lo | Tove Lo; Ali Payami | Lady Wood | 2016 | |
| "Kick in the Head" | Tove Lo | Tove Lo; Timothy Nelson | Dirt Femme | 2022 | |
| "Killin' It" | Cher Lloyd | Tove Lo; Shellback; Ludvig Söderberg; Jakob Jerlström; Savan Kotecha; Cher Lloyd | Sorry I'm Late | 2014 | |
| "Lady Wood" | Tove Lo | Tove Lo; Oscar Holter; Ludvig Söderberg | Lady Wood | 2016 | |
| "Let me go OH OH" | SG Lewis and Tove Lo | Tove Lo; Samuel George Lewis; Orlando Higginbottom | Heat | 2024 | |
| "Lies in the Dark" | Tove Lo | Tove Lo; Mike Riley; Daniel Traynor | Fifty Shades Darker: Original Motion Picture Soundtrack | 2017 | |
| "Light Beams" | Tove Lo | Tove Lo; Ludvig Söderberg; Jakob Jerlström | Blue Lips | 2017 | |
| "Light Me Up" | Icona Pop | Fransisca Hall; Caroline Hjelt; Aino Jawo; Tove Lo; Elof Loelv; Nick Scapa; Read Fasse | This Is... Icona Pop | 2013 | |
| "Like Em Young" | Tove Lo | Tove Lo; Jakob Jerlström; Ludvig Söderberg | Queen of the Clouds | 2014 | |
| "Like You" | Unknown | Tove Lo; Mike Riley; Jason Gill; Alexander Kronlund | Non-album song | Unknown | |
| "The Love" | Tove Lo | Tove Lo ‡ | Queen of the Clouds | 2014 | |
| "Love Ballad" † | Tove Lo | Tove Lo; Jakob Jerlström; Ludvig Söderberg | Truth Serum; Queen of the Clouds | 2012 | |
| "Love Bites" † | Nelly Furtado, Tove Lo, and SG Lewis | Nelly Furtado; Tove Lo; Samuel George Lewis | 7 | 2024 | |
| "Love Me like You Do" † | Ellie Goulding | Max Martin; Tove Lo; Savan Kotecha; Ilya Salmanzadeh; Ali Payami | Fifty Shades of Grey and Delirium | 2015 | |
| "Mateo" | Tove Lo | Tove Lo; Max Martin; Jakob Jerlström; Ludvig Söderberg | Sunshine Kitty | 2019 | |
| "Mistaken" | Tove Lo | Tove Lo; Joel Little | Sunshine Kitty | 2019 | |
| "Moments" † | Tove Lo | Tove Lo ‡ | Queen of the Clouds | 2014 | |
| "My Gun" | Tove Lo | Tove Lo; Daniel Ledinsky; Jakob Jerlström; Ludvig Söderberg | Queen of the Clouds | 2014 | |
| "New Woman" † | Lisa featuring Rosalía | Lalisa Manobal; Rosalía Vila Tobella; Ilya Salmanzadeh; Max Martin; Tove Burman Tove Lo | Alter Ego | 2024 | |
| "No One Dies From Love" † | Tove Lo | Tove Lo; Ludvig Söderberg | Dirt Femme | 2022 | |
| "No Repeats" | Cinnamon Girl | Tove Lo; Oscar Görres; Ilya Salmanzadeh; Camilla Roholm | Non-album song | Unknown | |
| "Not Made for This World" | Tove Lo | Tove Lo; Tobias Jimson; Michel Flygard | Queen of the Clouds | 2014 | |
| "Not on Drugs" † | Tove Lo | Tove Lo; Alx Reuterskiöld; Jakob Jerlström; Ludvig Söderberg | Truth Serum; Queen of the Clouds | 2014 | |
| "Ok" | Mat Sherman | Tove Lo; Mat Sherman | Non-album song | Unknown | |
| "One in a Million" | Hilary Duff | Tove Lo; Oscar Görres; Ilya Salmanzadeh | Breathe In. Breathe Out. | 2015 | |
| "Our Lady of Sorrows" | Allie X | Alexandra Hughes; Tove Lo | Girl with No Face (Deluxe) | 2024 | |
| "Out of Mind" † | Tove Lo | Tove Lo; Alx Reuterskiöld | Truth Serum | 2013 | |
| "Out of My Head" † | Charli XCX featuring Tove Lo and Alma | Charlotte Aitchison; Alexander Guy Cook; Sophie Xeon; Tove Lo; Alma-Sofia Miettinen | Pop 2 | 2017 | |
| "Over" | Tove Lo | Tove Lo; Jason Gill; Mattias Larsson; Robin Fredriksson | Truth Serum | 2014 | |
| "The Pain" | Tove Lo | Tove Lo ‡ | Queen of the Clouds | 2014 | |
| "Paradise" | Tove Lo | Tove Lo; Elliot Wilkins; Michael Riley | Truth Serum | 2014 | |
| "Passion and Pain Taste the Same When I'm Weak" | Tove Lo | Tove Lo; Finneas O'Connell | Sunshine Kitty (Paw Prints Edition) | 2020 | |
| "Perfect Loop" | Unknown | Tove Lo; Jarl Aanestad | Non-album song | Unknown | |
| "Pieces" | MS MR | Elizabeth Plapinger; Tove Lo; Max Hershenow | How Does It Feel | 2015 | |
| "Pineapple Slice" | Tove Lo and SG Lewis | Tove Lo; Samuel George Lewis | Dirt Femme; AudioLust & Higher Love | 2022 | |
| "Predators and Monsters" † | Paige Cavell | Paige Williams; Tove Lo; Brian Higgins; Matthew Gray; Benjamin Taylor; Keir MacCulloch; Kyle Mackenzie | Non-album song | 2019 | |
| "Ready for the Weekend" | Icona Pop | Caroline Hjelt; Aino Jawo; Elof Loelv; Tove Lo | Icona Pop | 2012 | |
| "Really Don't Like U" † | Tove Lo featuring Kylie Minogue | Tove Lo; Ian Kirkpatrick; Caroline Ailin | Sunshine Kitty | 2019 | |
| "Red is the Way" † | Paige Cavell | Paige Williams; Tove Lo; Andrew Bullimore; Brian Higgins; Miranda Cooper; Toby Scott; Benjamin Taylor; Keir MacCulloch; Kyle Mackenzie | Non-album song | 2019 | |
| "Romantics" | Tove Lo featuring Daye Jack | Tove Lo; Choukri Gustmann; Daye Jack; Jakob Jerlström; Ludvig Söderberg; Lukas Loules | Blue Lips | 2017 | |
| "Rumors" | Adam Lambert featuring Tove Lo | Adam Lambert; Tove Lo; Oscar Görres; Shellback | The Original High | 2015 | |
| "Run On Love" † | Lucas Nord featuring Tove Lo | Tove Lo; Lucas Nordqvist | Islands | 2013 | |
| "Sadder Badder Cooler" † | Tove Lo | Tove Lo; Max Martin; Elvira Anderfjärd | Sunshine Kitty (Paw Prints Edition) | 2020 | |
| "Say It" † | Flume featuring Tove Lo | Harley Edward Streten; Tove Lo; Daniel Johns | Skin | 2016 | |
| "Scars" † | Tove Lo | Tove Lo; Jakob Jerlström; Ludvig Söderberg | Allegiant (Original Motion Picture Score) | 2016 | |
| "Scream My Name" | Tove Lo | Tove Lo ‡ | The Hunger Games: Mockingjay, Part 1 – Original Motion Picture Soundtrack | 2014 | |
| "The Sex" | Tove Lo | Tove Lo ‡ | Queen of the Clouds | 2014 | |
| "Shifted" | Tove Lo | Tove Lo; Ludvig Söderberg; Svante Halldin; Jakob Hazell | Sunshine Kitty | 2019 | |
| "Shivering Gold" | Tove Lo | Tove Lo; Ludvig Söderberg | Blue Lips | 2017 | |
| "Shedontknowbutsheknows" | Tove Lo | Tove Lo; Ludvig Söderberg; Jakob Jerlström | Blue Lips | 2017 | |
| "Skippin' a Beat" | Zara Larsson | Jacob Kasher; Rickard Göransson; Tove Lo; Kevin Figs; Teddy Pena | 1 | 2014 | |
| "Something New" † | Girls Aloud | Brian Higgins; Wayne Hector; Tim Deal; Matt Gray; Carla Marie Williams; Tove Lo; Nicola Roberts; Florrie; Xenomania | Ten | 2012 | |
| "Sparks" † | Hilary Duff | Christian "Bloodshy" Karlsson; Tove Lo; Peter Thomas; Sam Shrieve | Breathe In. Breathe Out. | 2015 | |
| "Speak Now" | Unknown | Tove Lo; Matthew John Sherman | Non-album song | Unknown | |
| "Stay in Love" | Hilary Duff | Tove Lo; Michael Angelo | Breathe In. Breathe Out. | 2015 | |
| "Stay Over" | Tove Lo | Tove Lo; Ludvig Söderberg; Svante Halldin; Jakob Hazell | Sunshine Kitty | 2019 | |
| "Still Falling for You" † | Ellie Goulding | Tove Lo; Rickard Goransson; Ilya Salmanzadeh; Shellback; Ellie Goulding | Bridget Jones's Baby: Original Motion Picture Soundtrack | 2016 | |
| "Stranger" | Tove Lo | Tove Lo; Ali Payami; Niklas Ljungfelt | Blue Lips | 2017 | |
| "Strangers" | Seven Lions & Myon and Shane 54 featuring Tove Lo | Tove Lo; Seven Lions; Márió Égető | Worlds Apart | 2013 | |
| "Struggle" | Tove Lo | Tove Lo; Ludvig Söderberg; Jakob Jerlström | Blue Lips | 2017 | |
| "Suburbia" | Tove Lo | Tove Lo; Ludvig Söderberg | Dirt Femme | 2022 | |
| "Sweat" | Charli XCX | Charli XCX; Tove Lo; Gregory Hein; Rami Yacoub; Ian Kirkpatrick | PandoraMe advertisement | 2021 | |
| "Sweettalk My Heart" † | Tove Lo | Tove Lo; Ludvig Söderberg; Svante Halldin; Jakob Hazell | Sunshine Kitty | 2019 | |
| "Talking Body" † | Tove Lo | Tove Lo; Jakob Jerlström; Ludvig Söderberg | Queen of the Clouds | 2014 | |
| "That's Just Me" | Ella Eyre | Ella Eyre; Alexander Kronlund; Tove Lo; Ilya; Oscar Görres | Non-album song | 2014 | |
| "This Time Around" | Tove Lo | Tove Lo; Nate Campany; Kyle Shearer | Queen of the Clouds | 2014 | |
| "Thousand Miles" # | Tove Lo | Tove Lo; Michael Orabiyi; Jakob Jerlström; Ludvig Söderberg | Queen of the Clouds | 2014 | |
| "Thousand Needles" | Lea Michele | Tove Lo; Ali Payami | Louder | 2014 | |
| "Timebomb" † | Tove Lo | Tove Lo; Klas Åhlund; Alexander Kronlund | Queen of the Clouds | 2014 | |
| "True Disaster" † | Tove Lo | Tove Lo; Oscar Holter | Lady Wood | 2016 | |
| "True Romance" † | Tove Lo | Tove Lo; Timothy Nelson | Dirt Femme | 2022 | |
| "Truth or Dare" | Amelia Lily | Tove Lo; Annie Yuill; Luke Fitton; Matt Gray; Brian Higgins; Toby Scott; Tim Deal; MNEK | Be a Fighter | 2013 | |
| "Turn the World Upside Down" | Florrie | Florrie; Brian Higgins; Toby Scott; Annie Yuill; Tove Lo; Luke Fitton | ITVBe advertisement | 2014 | |
| "Venus Fly Trap" (Kito Remix) | Marina featuring Tove Lo | Marina Diamandis; Tove Lo | Non-album song | 2021 | |
| "Vibes" | Tove Lo featuring Joe Janiak | Tove Lo; Ludvig Söderberg; Jakob Jerlström; Joe Janiak | Lady Wood | 2016 | |
| "The Way That I Am" | Tove Lo | Tove Lo; Ali Payami | Queen of the Clouds | 2014 | |
| "We Got the World" † | Icona Pop | Caroline Hjelt; Aino Jawo; Linus Eklöw; Nicole Morier; Tove Lo | Icona Pop | 2012 | |
| "What Are You Waiting For?" † | The Saturdays | MNEK; Carla Marie Williams; Annie Yuill; Florrie; Tim Deal; Brian Higgins; Miranda Cooper; Tove Lo; Luke Fritton; Matt Gray; Gavin Harris; Nick Hill; Toby Scott | Finest Selection: The Greatest Hits | 2014 | |
| "Win Win" † | Diplo featuring Tove Lo | Danny Chien; Tove Lo; Ely Rise; Philip Meckseper; Diplo | Higher Ground | 2019 | |
| "Worst Behaviour" | Alma featuring Tove Lo | Alma; Maria Hazell; Jeremy Chacon; Jonas Kalisch; Alexsej Vlasenko; Henrik Meinke; Tove Lo | Have U Seen Her? Part 1 Have U Seen Her? | 2019 | |
| "WTF Love Is" | Tove Lo | Tove Lo; Ludvig Söderberg; Jakob Jerlström | Lady Wood | 2016 | |
| "WTFAWFI?" | Mat Sherman | Tove Lo; Mat Sherman | Non-album song | Unknown | |

== Songs recorded by Tove Lo ==
The following is a list of songs that were recorded by Tove Lo but not written or co-written by her.

| Title | Artist(s) | Songwriter(s) | Album(s) | Year | Ref. |
|---|---|---|---|---|---|
| "Dancing on My Own" (triple j Like A Version) | Tove Lo | Robin Carlsson; Patrick Berger | Non-album song | 2023 | |
| "Pitch Black" | Tove Lo | Choukri Gustmann; Lukas Loules | Blue Lips | 2017 | |
