= Blue Lips (film) =

2018 short film by Tove Lo

- Film poster
- Directed by: Malia James
- Screenplay by: Malia James; Tove Lo
- Produced by: Jeff Kopchia; Tiffany Suh
- Starring: Tove Lo; Ana Coto; Jafin Carvey
- Cinematography: Sy Turnbull
- Edited by: Chris Roebuck
- Distributed by: Universal Music Group
- Release date: 19 October 2018
- Running time: 25 minutes
- Country: United States
- Language: English

Blue Lips is a 2018 short film co-produced, co-written and starring Swedish singer-songwriter Tove Lo. The film was released on YouTube and Vevo on 19 October 2018, and features ten songs, nine from Lo's third studio album, Blue Lips (2017), and one from her second studio album, Lady Wood (2016). It was directed and written by Malia James with Lo working on the screenplay as well while Nathan Scherrer and Laura Haber served as executive producers.

Unlike Fairy Dust, one of Lo's previous short films, Blue Lips featured parts of the songs instead of using them completely, also it mixes a diegetic and non-diegetic use of the songs. The film centers around friends Ebba (played by Lo) and Kit (played by Ana Coto) as they party after the latter suffers a heartbreak.

== Plot ==
The film opens with Kit roller skating in a roller rink, she talks with Ebba outside and tells her that she feels bad because a guy with whom she was dating came back with his ex-girlfriend. Ebba and Kit go to the house of Ebba's aunt to forget about everything, while in the car they listen to music. They get ready to go to a party and help each other to get dressed. At the party they dance and get drunk, Kit meets Romy and kisses her passionately at the bathroom. After the party Ebba and Kit go to a grocery store and start messing around with the products and playing with the stuff they find at the store. They both take a bath together and talk at the bathtub about the future, their friendship and love.

At the next day they lay next to the pool from the house they are staying in and talk about guys, Kit goes to another grocery store to buy some chips where she meets Guy, they flirt and she invites him to a party. They both talk about Guy and the party they are going to later that day. At the party Ebba meets Guy without knowing who he is until Kit tells her, they get along and party together, Ebba talks with TJ and Ricky while Kit leaves because she feels jealous about the flirting between Ebba and Guy. Ebba and Kit discuss about Guy outside the party, Kit leaves angry and Ebba stays and dances with Guy.

Ebba and Guy get to know each other better at Guy's house, they drink tequila and share stories about their lives, Ebba and Guy walk together and kiss. Ebba goes home and lays in bed with Kit as they hug and amend their friendship. In the post-credits scene Ebba appears singing the rest of "Cycles" at the roller rink.

== Cast ==
- Tove Lo as Ebba
- Ana Coto as Kit
- Jafin Garvey as Guy
- Kera Armendariz as Romy
- Justin Jairam as TJ
- Justin Jackson as Ricky

== Songs ==
Number	Song	Album
1.	"Bad Days"	Blue Lips
2.	"Shivering Gold"	Blue Lips
3.	"Stranger"	Blue Lips
4.	"Disco Tits"	Blue Lips
5.	"Struggle"	Blue Lips
6.	"Shedontknowbutsheknows"	Blue Lips
7.	"Bitches"	Blue Lips
8.	"Cool Girl"	Lady Wood
9.	"Romantics" (featuring Daye Jack)	Blue Lips
10.	“Dont Ask Dont Tell”	Blue Lips
11.	"Cycles"	Blue Lips
