= Lady Wood Tour =

2017 concert tour by Tove Lo

- Tour by Tove Lo
- Associated album: Lady Wood
- Start date: 6 February 2017
- End date: 14 October 2017
- No. of shows: 32 in North America; 23 in Europe; 5 in South America; 3 in Oceania; 63 in total

Tove Lo concert chronology
- Queen of the Clouds Tour (2015); Lady Wood Tour (2017); Sunshine Kitty Tour (2019–20)

The Lady Wood Tour was the second headlining concert tour by Swedish singer Tove Lo in support of her second major-label studio album, Lady Wood (2016). The tour began on 6 February 2017, in Seattle, Washington, at the Showbox SoDo, and it concluded on 14 October 2017 at the Austin City Limits Music Festival in Austin, Texas.

== Background ==
11 North American tour dates and 10 European tour dates (21 dates in total), were officially announced on 23 October 2016, 5 days before the release of Lady Wood. Tickets for the shows went on sale on 28 October 2016. All 11 of the North American dates are supported by American singer Phoebe Ryan, and all 10 of the European dates are supported by Broods, a music duo from New Zealand. More dates for various music festivals and other miscellaneous concerts across Europe, South America, Oceania, and United States were announced at separate times. On 16 February 2017 it was announced that Lo would be supporting Coldplay on their A Head Full of Dreams Tour from 11 June 2017 to 8 October 2017, separate from the Lady Wood Tour.

== Set list ==
This set list is representative of the show on 7 February 2017 in Portland, Oregon. It does not represent all dates throughout the tour.

1. "True Disaster"
2. "Lady Wood"
3. "Influence"
4. "Moments"
5. "The Way That I Am"
6. "Not on Drugs"
7. "Thousand Miles"
8. "Vibes"
9. "Got Love"
10. "Talking Body"
11. "Imaginary Friend"
12. "Keep It Simple"
13. "WTF Love Is"
14. "Flashes"
15. "Cool Girl"

Encore

16. "Bitches"
17. "Habits (Stay High)"
Notes
- On 16 April 2017 at the Coachella Valley Music and Arts Festival, Lo performed a song titled "Struggle" from her third studio album Blue Lips for the very first time.

== Shows ==
List of concerts, showing date, city, country, venue, and opening acts.
Date	City	Country	Venue	Opening acts	Attendance	Revenue
North America
6 February 2017	Seattle	United States	Showbox SoDo	Phoebe Ryan	1,500 / 1,500	$38,000
7 February 2017	Portland	United States	Roseland Theater	Phoebe Ryan	1,400 / 1,400	$45,000
8 February 2017	Oakland	United States	Fox Oakland Theatre	Phoebe Ryan	2,828 / 2,828	$99,005
10 February 2017	Los Angeles	United States	The Novo	Phoebe Ryan	—N/a	—N/a
12 February 2017	Santa Ana	United States	The Observatory	Michl	—N/a	—N/a
15 February 2017	Minneapolis	United States	First Avenue	Phoebe Ryan	—N/a	—N/a
16 February 2017	Chicago	United States	House of Blues Chicago	Phoebe Ryan	—N/a	—N/a
17 February 2017	Toronto	Canada	Massey Hall	Phoebe Ryan	—N/a	—N/a
19 February 2017	Boston	United States	House of Blues Boston	Phoebe Ryan	—N/a	—N/a
20 February 2017	Philadelphia	United States	Electric Factory	Phoebe Ryan	—N/a	—N/a
22 February 2017	New York City	United States	Hammerstein Ballroom	Phoebe Ryan	—N/a	—N/a
24 February 2017	Washington, D.C.	United States	9:30 Club	Phoebe Ryan	1,200 / 1,200	$42,000
Europe
2 March 2017	Stockholm	Sweden	Munich Brewery	Broods	—N/a	—N/a
3 March 2017	Gothenburg	Sweden	Pustervik	Broods	—N/a	—N/a
4 March 2017	Copenhagen	Denmark	Vega	Broods	—N/a	—N/a
6 March 2017	Berlin	Germany	Astra Cultural Center	Broods	—N/a	—N/a
8 March 2017	Amsterdam	Netherlands	The Max	Broods	—N/a	—N/a
10 March 2017	Cologne	Germany	Live Music Hall	Broods	—N/a	—N/a
12 March 2017	Antwerp	Belgium	Trix Music Center	Broods	—N/a	—N/a
13 March 2017	Paris	France	The Cicada	Broods	—N/a	—N/a
15 March 2017	Manchester	England	The Ritz	Broods	—N/a	—N/a
17 March 2017	London	England	O_{2} Shepherd's Bush Empire	Broods	—N/a	—N/a
South America
24 March 2017	São Paulo	Brazil	Audio Club	—N/a	—N/a	—N/a
25 March 2017 (Note: The show on 25 March 2017 was part of Lollapalooza Brazil.)	São Paulo	Brazil	José Carlos Pace Racetrack	—N/a	—N/a	—N/a
28 March 2017	Buenos Aires	Argentina	Vorterix Theater	—N/a	—N/a	—N/a
31 March 2017 (Note: The show on 31 March 2017 was part of Lollapalooza Argentina.)	Buenos Aires	Argentina	San Isidro Racecourse	—N/a	—N/a	—N/a
1 April 2017 (Note: The show on 1 April 2017 was part of Lollapalooza Chile.)	Santiago	Chile	O'Higgins Park	—N/a	—N/a	—N/a
North America
5 April 2017	Mexico City	Mexico	Pabellón Cuervo	Mariana BO	—N/a	—N/a
16 April 2017 (Note: The shows on 16 April 2017 and 26 April 2017 were part of the Coachella Valley Music and Arts Festival.)	Indio	United States	Empire Polo Club		—N/a	—N/a
19 April 2017	Scottsdale	United States	Livewire	Grace Mitchell	—N/a	—N/a
21 April 2017	Las Vegas	United States	Brooklyn Bowl Las Vegas	Sofi Tukker	—N/a	—N/a
23 April 2017	Indio	United States	Empire Polo Club	—N/a	—N/a	—N/a
1 June 2017	New York City	United States	Irving Plaza	Tkay Maidza	—N/a	—N/a
2 June 2017 (Note: The show on 2 June 2017 was part of the Governors Ball Music Festival.)	New York City	United States	Randalls and Wards Island	—N/a	—N/a	—N/a
8 June 2017 (Note: The show on 8 June 2017 was part of the Bonnaroo Music Festival.)	Manchester	United States	Great Stage Park	—N/a	—N/a	—N/a
Europe
16 June 2017 (Note: The show on 16 June 2017 was part of Bergenfest.)	Bergen	Norway	Bergenhus Fortress	—N/a	—N/a	—N/a
19 June 2017	Warsaw	Poland	Club Stodola	Lanberry	—N/a	—N/a
21 June 2017	Hamburg	Germany	Docks	Jasmine Thompson	—N/a	—N/a
22 June 2017 (Note: The show on 22 June 2017 was part of Tinderbox.)	Odense	Denmark	The Thousand Year Forest	—N/a	—N/a	—N/a
24 June 2017 (Note: The show on 24 June 2017 was part of the Glastonbury Festival.)	Pilton	England	Worthy Farm	—N/a	—N/a	—N/a
26 June 2017	Brighton	England	Concorde 2	Will Heard	—N/a	—N/a
28 June 2017	Munich	Germany	Werk, Backstage	Cosby	—N/a	—N/a
2 July 2017 (Note: The show on 2 July 2017 was part of British Summer Time.)	London	England	Hyde Park	—N/a	—N/a	—N/a
7 July 2017 (Note: The show on 7 July 2017 was part of Ruisrock.)	Turku	Finland	Ruissalo	—N/a	—N/a	—N/a
13 July 2017 (Note: The show on 13 July 2017 was part of Slottsfjell.)	Tønsberg	Norway	Slottsfjellet	—N/a	—N/a	—N/a
Oceania
23 July 2017 (Note: The show on 23 July 2017 was part of Splendour in the Grass.)	Byron Bay	Australia	North Byron Parklands	—N/a	—N/a	—N/a
26 July 2017	Sydney	Australia	The Metro Theatre	Tigertown	—N/a	—N/a
28 July 2017	Melbourne	Australia	Prince Bandroom	Tigertown	—N/a	—N/a
North America
4 August 2017 (Note: The show on 4 August 2017 was part of the Osheaga Festival.)	Montreal	Canada	Parc Jean-Drapeau	—N/a	—N/a	—N/a
6 August 2017 (Note: The show on 6 August 2017 was part of Lollapalooza.)	Chicago	United States	Grant Park	—N/a	—N/a	—N/a
11 August 2017 (Note: The show on 11 August 2017 was part of the Outside Lands Music and Arts Festival.)	San Francisco	United States	Golden Gate Park	—N/a	—N/a	—N/a
Europe
18 August 2017 (Note: The show on 18 August 2017 was part of Pukkelpop.)	Kiewit	Belgium	Pukkelpop	—N/a	—N/a	—N/a
19 August 2017 (Note: The show on 19 August 2017 was part of Lowlands.)	Biddinghuizen	Netherlands	Spijk en Bremerberg	—N/a	—N/a	—N/a
2 September 2017 (Note: The show on 2 September 2017 was part of Popaganda.)	Stockholm	Sweden	Eriksdalsbadet	—N/a	—N/a	—N/a
North America
16 September 2017 (Note: The show on 16 September 2017 was part of Music Midtown.)	Atlanta	United States	Piedmont Park	—N/a	—N/a	—N/a
17 September 2017	Nashville	United States	Marathon Music Works	Daye Jack	923 / 974	$25,895
18 September 2017	Kansas City	United States	The Truman	Daye Jack	—N/a	—N/a
20 September 2017	Denver	United States	Ogden Theatre	Daye Jack	—N/a	—N/a
21 September 2017	Salt Lake City	United States	The Depot	Daye Jack	—N/a	—N/a
7 October 2017 (Note: The 7 October 2017 and 14 October 2017 shows were part of the Austin City Limits Music Festival.)	Austin	United States	Zilker Park	—N/a	—N/a	—N/a
10 October 2017	Tucson	United States	Rialto Theatre	Daye Jack	—N/a	—N/a
12 October 2017	Austin	United States	Emo's	Daye Jack	—N/a	—N/a
13 October 2017	Houston	United States	House of Blues Houston	Daye Jack	—N/a	—N/a
14 October 2017	Austin	United States	Zilker Park	—N/a	—N/a	—N/a

=== Cancelled and postponed shows ===
List of cancelled concerts, showing date, city, country, venue and reason for cancellation
Date	City	Country	Venue	Opening acts	Reason
4 June 2017 (Note: The cancelled show on 4 June 2017 was part of the Free Press Summer Fest.)	Houston	United States	Eleanor Tinsley Park	—N/a	Inclement weather
13 September 2017	Fort Lauderdale	United States	Revolution Live	Daye Jack	Hurricane Irma
14 September 2017	Orlando	United States	The Plaza Live	Daye Jack	Hurricane Irma
