= Fairy Dust =

Fairy dust is used by Tinker Bell in Peter Pan.

Fairy Dust may also refer to:

- Fairy Dust, a fragrance released by Paris Hilton
- Fairy Dust (film), a 2016 short film by Tove Lo
- "Fairy Dust", a song by Tove Lo from Lady Wood
- "Fairy Dust", a song by Joe Jackson from Volume 4
