= Blue Lips (Tove Lo album) =

Studio album by Tove Lo
- Released: 17 November 2017
- Recorded: October 2016 – July 2017
- Studios: Wolf Cousins Studios (Stockholm, Sweden)
- Genres: Dance-pop; electropop
- Length: 44:24
- Label: Island
- Producers: Choukri Gustmann; Alex Hope; Jack & Coke; Lulou; Ali Payami; The Struts; Gustav Weber Vernet

Tove Lo chronology
Lady Wood (2016)	Blue Lips (2017)	Sunshine Kitty (2019)

Alternative cover
- 2018 vinyl reissue with Lady Wood

Singles from Blue Lips
- 1. "Disco Tits" Released: 7 September 2017; 2. "Bitches" Released: 7 June 2018

Blue Lips (Note: The title is sometimes subtitled as Blue Lips (Lady Wood Phase II) and stylised as BLUE LIPS [lady wood phase II].) is the third studio album by Swedish singer Tove Lo. It was released on 17 November 2017 by Island Records. Blue Lips is considered the second half of a two-piece concept album that describe "highs, lows and ultimate demise of a relationship." Its chapters "Light Beams" and "Pitch Black" succeed the chapters "Fairy Dust" and "Fire Fade" from her previous album Lady Wood (2016).

In addition to the return of songwriter-producers such as the Struts, Ali Payami and Joe Janiak, the album features new collaborations with Alex Hope and Lulou, among others. Daye Jack is the only featured artist on the album. Musically, the album has been described as "sharply conceived dance-pop" and it is noted to follow the "hypnotizing electro-pop vein" of the preceding album that also features hip-hop and trap-influenced production.

A short film of the same name was released on 19 October 2018 to accompany the album.

== Background and recording ==
Tove Lo's previous album, Lady Wood, was released on 28 October 2016 to positive critical reviews and fair commercial success, with it eventually becoming her highest-charting album in the United States to date. In press interviews in support of the album's release, Tove Lo alluded to another album of thematically similar material slated for release the following year that was tentatively titled Lady Wood: Phase II. In early 2017, Tove Lo began the Lady Wood Tour in further support of the album, and during press interviews she said she was working on new material to be included with the portion that was already recorded during the Lady Wood sessions. She explained to Billboard, "There's a lot of songs that I wanted on [Lady Wood], but I didn't want to cram in 20 songs... so I decided to divide it into a double album, and release the second half a little bit later on".

The Blue Lips track "Bitches", originally titled "What I Want for the Night (Bitches)", was previewed through Tove Lo's short film Fairy Dust in October 2016 and a live version was released through Spotify in November 2016. Tove Lo also previewed the track "Struggle" (then titled "The Struggle") during her performance at the Coachella Valley Music and Arts Festival in April 2017.

During the months leading up to the album's release, Tove Lo said that thematically Blue Lips would be a "dramatic" and "highly emotional" sister to Lady Wood, and it would have two contrasting chapters: "Light Beams" and "Pitch Black". The album's official title was announced in conjunction with its lead single "Disco Tits" on 7 September 2017. The album's artwork was released on Tove Lo's social media on 31 October 2017.

== Release ==
Tove Lo began teasing the release of her third studio album since the release of Lady Wood in 2016. During January 2017, she suggested that the album would be released in the spring of that year, but on 31 October 2017 she confirmed that Blue Lips would be officially released on 17 November 2017. On the night of the album's release, Tove Lo hosted a release party concert at Elsewhere in Brooklyn, New York City.

== Singles ==
The lead single "Disco Tits" was released on 7 September 2017. It reached number 55 in Tove Lo's native Sweden, and topped the US Dance Club Songs Chart.

Tove Lo announced a remix of "Bitches" featuring Charli XCX, Icona Pop, Elliphant and Alma as the second single from Blue Lips. It was released on 7 June 2018.

== Critical reception ==
Professional ratings
Aggregate scores
Source	Rating
AnyDecentMusic?	7.1/10
Metacritic	74/100
Review scores
Source	Rating
AllMusic	4/5 stars
DIY	4/5 stars
Financial Times	4/5 stars
Metro	3/5 stars
The Observer	3/5 stars
Pitchfork	7.1/10
Renowned for Sound	4.5/5 stars
Rolling Stone	3/5 stars

Blue Lips received generally positive reviews from music critics. At Metacritic, which assigns a normalized rating out of 100 to reviews from mainstream critics, the album has an average score of 74 based on six reviews, indicating "generally favorable reviews".

Frank Guan of Vulture called Blue Lips "the best album of her career" and said that "it's indisputable that the tracks on Blue Lips hit harder than their predecessors". Will Hermes, in his short review of the album for Rolling Stone, stated "Like much of Tove Lo's work, it's admirably uncensored, but may leave you craving a shower, however close to home it lands." Cameron Cook of Pitchfork noted that "Blue Lips is not a straight-up disco record, but Lo uses that genre's soft focus sheen to recall an era grown from the sexual liberation of the '60s, while sheltered from the excesses of the '80s". He praised the "Light Beams" section of the album but criticized "Romantics", stating that "'Romantics', with its trendy trap beats and distorted vocals, pale slightly next to the wild ride of the album's first half."

=== Year-end lists ===
Critic/Publication	List	Rank	Ref.
Melty	Best Pop Albums of the Year	7	
Rolling Stone	20 Best Pop Albums of 2017	13	

== Track listing ==
Credits adapted from the album's liner notes and Tidal

Blue Lips
No.	Title	Writer(s)	Producer(s)	Length
1.	"Light Beams"	Tove Lo; Ludvig Söderberg; Jakob Jerlström	The Struts	1:07
2.	"Disco Tits"	Lo; Söderberg; Jerlström	The Struts	3:43
3.	"Shedontknowbutsheknows"	Lo; Söderberg; Jerlström	The Struts	3:16
4.	"Shivering Gold"	Lo; Söderberg	Söderberg; Jack & Coke	3:35
5.	"Don't Ask Don't Tell"	Lo; Ali Payami	Payami	3:46
6.	"Stranger"	Lo; Payami; Niklas Ljungfelt	Payami	3:54
7.	"Bitches"	Lo; Payami	Payami	2:17
8.	"Pitch Black"	Lukas Loules; Choukri Gustmann	Lulou; Gustmann	0:53
9.	"Romantics" (featuring Daye Jack)	Lo; Söderberg; Jerlström; Loules; Gustmann; Daye Jack	Lulou; Gustmann	3:31
10.	"Cycles"	Lo; Söderberg; Jerlström; Joe Janiak	The Struts	3:28
11.	"Struggle"	Lo; Söderberg; Jerlström	The Struts	3:46
12.	"9th of October"	Lo; Söderberg; Jerlström	The Struts	3:25
13.	"Bad Days"	Lo; Gustav Weber Vernet	Vernet	3:26
14.	"Hey You Got Drugs?"	Lo; Alex Hope	Hope	4:18
Total length:				44:24

Lady Wood and Blue Lips – Deluxe vinyl exclusive 10-inch picture disc
No.	Title	Writer(s)	Producer(s)	Length
1.	"Cool Girl" (Timbaland remix)	Lo; Söderberg; Jerlström	The Struts; Timbaland^{[a]}
2.	"WTF Love Is" (Karma Fields remix)	Lo; Söderberg; Jerlström	The Struts; Karma Fields^{[a]}
3.	"Cycles" (MK remix)	Lo; Söderberg; Jerlström; Janiak	The Struts; MK^{[a]}
4.	"Bitches" (featuring Charli XCX, Icona Pop, Elliphant, and Alma)	Lo; Payami; Elliphant; Nicki Adamsson	Payami

=== Notes ===
- ^{^[a]} signifies a remixer
- "Light Beams" and "Pitch Black" are stylised in all caps, while all other track titles are stylised in all lowercase.
- "Don't Ask Don't Tell" is stylised as "dont ask dont tell".
- "Disco Tits" features additional vocals by Fat Max Gsus.

== Charts ==
Chart (2017)	Peak position
Canadian Albums (Billboard)	78
Dutch Albums (Album Top 100)	86
French Digital Albums (SNEP)	61
New Zealand Heatseeker Albums (RMNZ)	4
Norwegian Albums (VG-lista)	39
Swedish Albums (Sverigetopplistan)	15
UK Album Downloads (Official Charts)	71
US Billboard 200	138

== Release history ==
Region	Date	Format(s)	Label	Ref.
Various	17 November 2017	Digital download; streaming	Island	
Various	17 December 2018	LP (with Lady Wood)	Island	
