= Fire Fade =

- Official visual poster
- Directed by: Tim Erem
- Screenplay by: Tim Erem; Tove Lo
- Produced by: Ian Blair; Fredrik Loving; Gustavo Leon; Tim Erem; Tove Lo
- Starring: Tove Lo; Vas Galohvastov; Quinn Straw; Harrison Bock
- Cinematography: Oliver Millar; Steve Annis
- Edited by: Gladys Bernadac; Jamie Foord; Sebastian Zotoff
- Music by: Wolf Cousins
- Production company: Diktator
- Distributed by: Universal Music Group
- Release date: August 25, 2017
- Running time: 21 minutes
- Language: English

Fire Fade is a 2017 short film co-produced and co-written by and starring Swedish singer-songwriter Tove Lo. The film coincides with the second "chapter" of Lo's second album, Lady Wood, which was released on 28 October 2016. The film was released on YouTube and Vevo on 25 August 2017 and it is a sequel of the short film Fairy Dust, which was released on 31 October 2016.

== Plot ==
The movie starts with Lo in the corridor of a motel, she starts talking about her emotional breakdown by saying "Everyone around is watching me or are they just looking when I look at them? I can't tell. My head and my ego are the same now. Everything is so beautiful but so cold. Where did the fire go?". The song "Don't Talk About It" starts playing and she starts dancing on the corridor, the song stops and she falls to the floor and she starts speaking out of breath about her intentions to not get married, she suddenly tries to catch a butterfly by dragging herself to the floor, after she managed to catch the butterfly she starts confessing her secrets to it. After the song "Imaginary Friend" starts playing, the butterfly escapes from the palm of her hands and she tries to catch it again by climbing on the walls. The song stops playing and she starts playing "My name is X baby" which is a Malaysian/Swedish clapping game that she probably played as a child. She manages to catch the butterfly for the second time, but she suddenly crushes the butterfly and she starts screaming on the balcony. The song "Keep It Simple" starts playing and several cuts of her climbing on the walls are shown, at the end of the song she starts crying on the ceiling, she starts singing acapella the chorus of the song "Flashes" in an empty closet and the song starts playing after the song stops, she leaves the room and she goes on the corridor and lays in a corner. Three handsome guys enter the room and the song "WTF Love Is" starts playing. She decides to enter the room to join the three guys to have sexual relationships with them. Lo faces the dark secrets of her past while she also has flashbacks to Fairy Dust. The movie ends with Lo getting herself out of the shower and laying on a chair in a bathrobe.

== Cast ==
- Tove Lo as herself
- Vas Galohvastov as first man
- Quinn Straw as second man
- Harrison Bock as third man

== Soundtrack ==
1.	"Don't Talk About It"
2.	"Fire Fade"
3.	"Imaginary Friend"
4.	"Keep It Simple"
5.	"Flashes"
6.	"WTF Love Is"
