= Influence (Tove Lo song) =

Promotional single by Tove Lo featuring Wiz Khalifa

from the album Lady Wood
- Released: 9 September 2016
- Recorded: 2016; Wolf Cousins Studios (Stockholm, Sweden)
- Genre: Electropop; hip hop; dance-pop; minimal techno
- Length: 3:44
- Label: Republic
- Songwriters: Tove Lo; Ludvig Söderberg; Jakob Jerlström; Wiz Khalifa
- Producer: The Struts

"Influence" is a song by Swedish singer-songwriter Tove Lo featuring American rapper Wiz Khalifa. It was released on the 9th of September, 2016 as a promotional single from her second studio album Lady Wood (2016), released through Republic Records. The song features a guest appearance from American rapper Wiz Khalifa, and was written by Lo and Khalifa, alongside its producers, the Struts. The song, an electropop, hip-hop, dance-pop, and minimal techno record, was recorded in 2016 at Wolf Cousins Studios, based in Stockholm, Sweden.

Upon the release of Lady Wood, the song was received positively by music critics, mainly for its sound and Khalifa's feature. Commercially, the song charted at number 78 on the Sverigetopplistan chart in Sweden and peaked at number 7 on the New Zealand Heatseekers chart. A music video for the song was directed by Tim Erem and included in Lo's debut short film Fairy Dust (2016). A "Chords Remix" of the track was later included on the Target exclusive version of the album.

== Critical reception ==
Alim Kheraj of DIY said that the song "sees Tove Lo appropriating the masculine role of the [fuckboi]." Entertainment Weekly's Madison Vain said that the singer "admits to being an unreliable narrator on one of the album's most irresistible tracks [...] before throwing the song to Wiz Khalifa for one of his fieriest verses yet." Writing for NME, Nick Levine noted that "she sings about hooking up and getting hard on [Lady Wood]", The Observer's Kitty Empire commented "there's actually rather little scarcity value in catchy tunes in [Influence]". Sal Cinquemani of Slant Magazine said that the song is "embodied by the substance-induced euphoria of [Influence]".

== Music video ==
The music video for "Influence" is a part of the short film Fairy Dust, which was directed by Tim Erem and premiered on 30 October 2016 via Lo's Vevo channel.

== Track listing ==
- TM88 – Taylor Gang Remix
1. "Influence" (TM88 – Taylor Gang Remix) (featuring Wiz Khalifa) – 4:27

== Credits and personnel ==
Credits adapted from Tidal.

- Tove Lo − vocals, songwriter
- Wiz Khalifa − vocals, songwriter
- Ludvig Söderberg − songwriter
- Jakob Jerlström − songwriter
- The Struts − producer, programmer
- Tom Coyne − mastering engineer
- John Hanes − mixing engineer
- Serban Ghenea − mixer

== Charts ==
Chart (2016)	Peak position
New Zealand Heatseekers (RMNZ)	5
Sweden (Sverigetopplistan)	78
