= True Disaster =

- Remixes EP cover

Single by Tove Lo

from the album Lady Wood
- Released: 15 November 2016
- Recorded: 2016; Wolf Cousins Studios (Stockholm, Sweden)
- Genre: Synth-pop; electro; electropop
- Length: 3:24
- Label: Republic
- Songwriters: Tove Lo; Oscar Holter
- Producer: Oscar Holter

Tove Lo singles chronology
"Cool Girl" (2016)	"True Disaster" (2016)	"Disco Tits" (2017)

Music video
- "True Disaster" on YouTube

"True Disaster" is a song by Swedish singer-songwriter Tove Lo released as the second single from Lady Wood (2016), her second studio album. The song was written by Lo and Oscar Holter, and produced by Holter. It was released for US radio on 15 November 2016 by Republic Records. On 3 February 2017, Lo released the remixed version of the song called "True Disaster (Cut Snake Remix)".

== Composition ==
"True Disaster"
A 19-second sample of "True Disaster".

"True Disaster" is a "dark", "pounding" 1980s-inspired synth-pop, electro, and electropop song. Sheet music for the song is in the key of G♯ minor in standard time with a tempo of 96 beats per minute. Lyrically, the song is about the pain that comes with destructive love. She suggests that she is willing to get hurt and doesn't care, indicated by the lines:

"Come on, zero fucks about it / Come on, I know I'm gonna get hurt", and "Keep playing my heartstrings faster and faster / You can be just what I want, my true disaster."

== Music video ==
Tove Lo in a scene from the clip dancing in the middle of a deserted street.

The music video for "True Disaster" is a part of the short film Fairy Dust, which was directed by Tim Erem and premiered on 30 October 2016 via Lo's Vevo channel. The standalone video debuted on 29 November 2016 on her YouTube and Vevo channels. The video was filmed as a one-shot.

The video starts with the singer driving a car and having a normal conversation with the character named Lorna, played by Lina Esco, who plays the role of Lo's self-destructive alter ego. She suddenly bangs Lo's head against the car, causing an accident. Another scene shows Lorna pouring gasoline on the car. The singer wakes up, getting herself out of the car. She starts walking on a neon-lit street in a choreographed dance.

== Critical reception ==
Writing for Slant Magazine, Sal Cinquemani spoke favorably of the track and opined that "the new wave-infused [...] those gestures are filtered through a patently contemporary lens" comparing it to Taylor Swift's work on 1989. Heather Phares from AllMusic wrote "the sweet melody adds a thrill of anticipation." Alim Kheraj from DIY wrote in a review for Lady Wood, "[True Disaster] acknowledges and celebrates the singer’s flaws by juxtaposing them over industrial synths."

Nick Levine from NME noted the connection between the previous title-track saying "she sings about hooking up and getting hard on [Lady Wood], tells us she doesn’t fancy pretty boys (or pretty girls) on [True Disaster]". Katherine St. Asaph from Pitchfork spoke positively about the track defining it as "one of the year's best pop songs". Jon Dolan from Rolling Stone wrote that "her world is a mess of bleary late nights and confessional abandon". James Rettig from Stereogum wrote in a review for the track "It’s a sparkling, pulsating number about the inevitable devastation that comes with falling in love".

== Live performances ==
"True Disaster" was first performed at a pre-Video Music Awards concert in August 2016. On 19 November, Lo performed "True Disaster" on the French television show Quotidien. On 22 November, she performed the song for iHeartRadio, along with "Cool Girl", "Talking Body", "Keep It Simple", and "Habits (Stay High)" at The X Studio in Sydney.

== Track listing ==
- Digital EP − Remixes EP
1. "True Disaster" (Cut Snake Remix) – 5:04
2. "True Disaster" (Woody Runs Remix) – 2:41
3. "True Disaster" (LIOHN Remix) – 2:24
4. "True Disaster" (Youngr Remix) – 2:43

== Personnel ==
Credits adapted from the liner notes of Lady Wood.

- Vocals – Tove Lo
- Songwriting – Tove Lo, Oscar Holter
- Production – Oscar Holter
- Programming – Oscar Holter
- Bass, guitar, keyboards, percussion – Oscar Holter

== Charts ==
Chart (2016–17)	Peak position
Belgium (Ultratip Bubbling Under Wallonia)	31
Czech Republic (Rádio – Top 100)	26
Poland (Polish Airplay Top 100)	65
Russia Airplay (Tophit)	257
Sweden (Sverigetopplistan)	56
US Digital Song Sales (Billboard)	50

== Release history ==
Region	Date	Format(s)	Label	Ref.
Various	14 October 2016	Digital download (via pre-order of Lady Wood)	Island	
United States	15 November 2016	Contemporary hit radio	Republic	
Italy	18 November 2016	Contemporary hit radio	Universal	
