= Disco Tits =

Single by Tove Lo

from the album Blue Lips
- Released: 7 September 2017
- Recorded: April 2017
- Genre: Electroclash; dance-pop
- Length: 3:43
- Label: Republic
- Songwriters: Tove Lo; Ludvig Söderberg; Jakob Jerlström
- Producer: The Struts

Tove Lo singles chronology
| "True Disaster" (2016) | "Disco Tits" (2017) | "Out of My Head" (2017) |

Music video
- "Disco Tits" on YouTube

"Disco Tits" (stylized in all lowercase on the tracklist) is a song by Swedish singer-songwriter Tove Lo. It was released on 7 September 2017 as the lead single from Lo's third studio album, Blue Lips, and it was her first release after the short film Fire Fade. The song was released on Spotify a week prior to the song's official release, but was removed soon after.

== Composition ==
"Disco Tits" is a disco- and house-inflected electroclash and dance-pop song. The song moves at a tempo of 110 beats per minute. According to the singer, "Disco Tits" is about "losing yourself with your new found love."

We were at Coachella, and I had just performed. I was wearing this see-through top that looked like a disco ball exploded all over my boobs. I got offstage, and my boyfriend, he just turns around and goes, "Hey disco tits, let's go." And I was like, "Wow, that's me."

— Tove Lo on the inspiration for "Disco Tits",

== Critical reception ==
Tom Breihan of Stereogum praised the song's "sexy-deadpan delivery and its chilly throb." Hilary Hughes of MTV wrote that the song "is a banger to blast as you're getting hyped for a night out, and an anthem to keep you on the dance floor once you get there all rolled up in a single song." She additionally wrote that "it's definitely not for the faint of heart." Mike Wass of Idolator wrote that the song "retreats to the druggy dance-pop of Queen of the Clouds." David Sikorski of Ear Milk called the song "a sweat dripped, retro club banger that we just can't get enough of." Media site Uproxx described the song as "a disco-inspired take on a modern club banger that has some Robyn vibes."

=== Year-end lists ===
| Publication | Accolade | Rank | Ref. |
|---|---|---|---|
| BuzzFeed | 50 Best Pop Songs of 2017 | 5 | |
| Stereogum | Top 40 Pop Songs of 2017 | 36 | |
| Billboard | Top 100 Best Songs of 2017 | 51 | |

== Music video ==
The song's music video, directed by Tim Erem, premiered on 5 October 2017, via Lo's Vevo channel. The video begins with Tove Lo on a family-friendly talk show with a puppet. When being asked to describe the name "Lady Wood" she says a banned word. She then flirts with the puppet and invites him on a raunchy road trip filled with drugs and sex. The video was described by media as "titillating" and "riotous". Chris Malone Méndez of Billboard analyzed the music video by saying "while she [Lo] and the Muppet engage in foreplay, a handsome Swedish-looking man begins to take the place of the Muppet, presumably as a metaphor for her escapades (and sexcapades) with human men". As of 9 October 2025, the clip has over 14,000,000 views on YouTube.

== Track listing ==
- Digital download
1. "Disco Tits" – 3:44
- Remixes
1. "Disco Tits" (Oliver Remix) – 4:23
2. "Disco Tits" (Beatanger Remix) – 6:30
3. "Disco Tits" (KREAM Remix) – 2:59
- Remixes (Part II)
1. "Disco Tits" (Chris Lake Remix) – 5:02
2. "Disco Tits" (LENNO Remix) – 4:02
3. "Disco Tits" (MK Remix) – 5:02
- Karma Fields Remix
1. "Disco Tits" (Karma Fields Remix) – 4:03

== Personnel ==
Taken from Tidal.

- Tove Lo – lead vocals, songwriting
- Jakob Jerlström – songwriting, production
- Ludvig Söderberg – songwriting, production
- Chris Gehringer – mastering engineer
- John Hanes – assistant mixer
- Serban Ghenea – mixer
- Fat Max Gsus – additional vocals

== Charts ==
| Chart (2017) | Peak position |
|---|---|
| CIS Airplay (TopHit) | 108 |
| New Zealand Heatseekers (RMNZ) | 6 |
| Russia Airplay (TopHit) | 94 |
| Scotland Singles (OCC) | 94 |
| Sweden (Sverigetopplistan) | 55 |
| UK Singles Downloads (OCC) | 89 |
| US Digital Songs (Billboard) | 119 |
| US Dance Club Songs (Billboard) | 1 |

== Sales ==
| Region | Certification | Certified units/sales |
|---|---|---|
| United States | None | 5,498 |

== Release history ==
| Region | Release date | Format | Ref. |
|---|---|---|---|
| Worldwide | 7 September 2017 | Digital download | |
