= Bitches (song) =

Single by Tove Lo featuring Charli XCX, Icona Pop, Elliphant and Alma

from the album Blue Lips
- Released: 7 June 2018
- Genre: Dance-pop; electropop
- Length: 3:11 (single version); 2:17 (album version)
- Label: Island
- Songwriters: Tove Lo; Ali Payami; Nicki Adamsson (remix); Elliphant (remix)
- Producer: Ali Payami

Tove Lo singles chronology
"Colorblind" (2017)	"Bitches" (2018)	"Blow That Smoke" (2018)

Charli XCX singles chronology
"5 in the Morning" (2018)	"Bitches" (2018)	"Focus" / "No Angel" (2018)

Icona Pop singles chronology
"Faded Away" (2018)	"Bitches" (2018)	"X's" (2018)

Elliphant singles chronology
"HZE" (2018)	"Bitches" (2018)	"Revelations" (2018)

Alma singles chronology
"Out of My Head" (2017)	"Bitches" (2018)	"Cowboy" (2018)

Music video
- "Bitches" on YouTube

"Bitches" (stylised in lowercase letters) is a song by Swedish singer Tove Lo from her third studio album, Blue Lips (2017). The official remix featuring British singer Charli XCX, Swedish duo Icona Pop, Swedish singer Elliphant, and Finnish singer Alma was released on 7 June 2018 as a single.

== Background and development ==
On 28 October 2016, Lo released her second studio album, Lady Wood, which is split in two parts, "Fairy Dust" and "Fire Fade". Two short films inspired by these two chapters were released on YouTube and Vevo. The first one, Fairy Dust, was released on 31 October 2016, three days after the album's release. It is based on the first six songs of the album; however, "Bitches", at that time titled "(What I Want for the Night) Bitches", was played during the film's end-credits scene. A live version of the song was recorded and released on Spotify. The singer also performed the song on her Lady Wood Tour.

The studio version of the song was later included on Lo's third album, Blue Lips, released on 17 November 2017. In the song, Lo references American girl group Fifth Harmony, who she had met at some Jingle Ball performances. She explained that she was surprised by how sexy and confident they became when performing on stage despite their wholesome image and reputation, and had met one of the band members while working on the song at the recording studio.

On 4 June 2018, Lo announced the remix of the song, featuring Charli XCX, Icona Pop, Elliphant and Alma, which was released as the second single from Blue Lips on 7 June 2018, alongside the music video.

== Music video ==
The music video for "Bitches", directed by Broad City director Lucia Aniello, was released on 7 June 2018. The video features Broad City actor Paul W. Downs and actress Jessy Hodges as a couple who go to the supergroup for training on how to spice up their sex life. The video shows the couple being applied with BDSM accessories, before educating them about various sex tips and the singers putting the couple in a cage to take a break to eat sushi takeout. The video continues with Downs' character showing what he has learned, ducking offscreen under his partner as the singers dance in a room with multicolored neon lights. The video ends with the couple walking out of the building, Downs' character more optimistic now about their sex life, right before the Hodges' character tells him that she will be leaving him and returning to the supergroup.

== Track listing ==
- Digital download
1. "Bitches" – 3:11

== Credits and personnel ==
Adapted from Tidal.

- Tove Lo – lead vocals, composer, lyricist
- Elliphant – featured artist, composer, lyricist
- Nicki Adamsson – composer
- Ali Payami – composer, producer, programmer, studio personnel
- Charli XCX – featured artist
- Alma – featured artist
- Icona Pop – featured artist
- Chris Galland – mixing engineer, studio personnel
- Björn Engelmann – mastering engineer, studio personnel
- Robin Florent – assistant mixer, studio personnel
- Scott Desmarais – assistant mixer, studio personnel
- Manny Marroquin – mixer, studio personnel
