= Lady Wood =

2016 studio album by Tove Lo

Studio album by Tove Lo
- Released: 28 October 2016
- Recorded: July 2015 – April 2016
- Studios: Wolf Cousins (Stockholm) (Note: Tracks 2–6 and 8–12); MXM (Los Angeles) (Note: Tracks 8 and 10); Golden Age (Los Angeles) (Note: Track 9)
- Genres: Electropop; synth-pop; dance-pop; tech house
- Length: 39:35
- Label: Island
- Producers: Oscar Görres; Oscar Holter; Ilya; Joel Little; Ali Payami; Ludvig Söderberg; The Struts

Tove Lo chronology
Queen of the Clouds (2014)	Lady Wood (2016)	Blue Lips (2017)

Alternative cover
- 2018 deluxe vinyl reissue with Blue Lips

Singles from Lady Wood
- 1. "Cool Girl" Released: 4 August 2016; 2. "True Disaster" Released: 15 November 2016

Lady Wood is the second studio album by Swedish singer Tove Lo, released on 28 October 2016 by Island Records. Lady Wood is considered the first half of a two-piece concept album that describe "highs, lows and ultimate demise of a relationship." Its chapters "Fairy Dust" and "Fire Fade" precede the chapters "Light Beams" and "Pitch Black" from her following album Blue Lips (2017). It was recorded between July 2015 and May 2016, which Lo commented was a quicker turnaround than the "whole life" she was afforded when creating her previous record Queen of the Clouds (2014).

The tracks that begin each chapter are instrumental compositions by The Struts member Ludvig Södberg ("Fairy Dust"), and Ilya Salmanzadeh ("Fire Fade"). Including the introductory tracks, Lo co-wrote the album's 10 songs. The album features new collaborations with producers Ilya, Oscar Holter, Oscar Görres, Rickard Göransson, and Joel Little, and guest vocals from rapper Wiz Khalifa, and fellow singer-songwriter, Joe Janiak. Two short films complemented the album's two chapters. The first, Fairy Dust, was released on 31 October 2016, and was followed by Fire Fade on 25 August 2017. These short films focus on a fictionalized, self-destructive version of Lo while expanding on the album's lyrical themes. Both short films were produced by Diktator, written by Lo and Tim Erem and directed by Erem.

"Cool Girl" was serviced as the lead single from Lady Wood on 4 August 2016, reaching number 15 in Sweden and number 84 on the US Billboard Hot 100. "True Disaster" was released on 15 November 2016 as the album's second single. The album peaked at number 11 on the US Billboard 200, becoming her highest-charting album in the country to date. To promote the album, Lo embarked on her second concert tour, Lady Wood Tour.

== Background and composition ==
Lady Wood was inspired by "the chase, the rush, the peak, and the downfall [of the] emotional rollercoaster" Lo experienced since her extended play Truth Serum and debut studio album Queen of the Clouds were released in 2014. The album consists of two chapters: "Fairy Dust", which details the euphoria surrounding a gratifying encounter, and "Fire Fade", which highlights a subsequent sense of self-awareness. Lo announced Lady Wood is to be the first half of a two-piece album, with the third and fourth chapters "Light Beam" and "Pitch Black" to be included on Lo's third studio album in 2017.

== Title and release ==
On 17 August 2016, Lo revealed that her second studio album would be titled Lady Wood and would be released on 28 October. About the title, Tove Lo recalls "writing the bridge of the title track, and thinking that I wanted to say, like, 'You're turning me on,' but I wanted to find another word. Like, what's the word for a female hard-on? I think I heard it in a movie somewhere—they were just like, 'You give me wood.' And I was like, 'Girl wood, or, Lady wood! Yes!'"

== Promotion ==
The lead single from the album, "Cool Girl", was released on 4 August 2016, reaching number 15 in Sweden and number 84 on the US Billboard Hot 100.

"Influence" was released on 9 September 2016 as the first promotional single from the album. The song features American rapper Wiz Khalifa. "True Disaster" was originally released on 14 October 2016 as the second promotional single. The song was sent to US contemporary hit radio on 15 November 2016 as the album's second single.

=== Tour ===
On 23 October 2016, five days prior to the release of the Lady Wood, Lo announced North American and European headlining Lady Wood Tour, with special guests Phoebe Ryan and Broods, to promote the album. Various South American dates, Australian dates, other miscellaneous concerts, and festival dates were later announced at different times. The tour kicked off on 6 February 2017 in Seattle, Washington.

=== Fairy Dust and Fire Fade ===
["Fairy Dust"] is when I hear the fans shouting my name and I'm about to hit the stage. "Fire Fade" is when it all sort of starts to wear off and I'm losing connection with the fans a bit, and I'm trying to get back to that first chase. You feel vulnerable there. It's where you start to reveal your true self.

— Lo describing the chapters of Lady Wood.

The trailer for Fairy Dust, a short film based on the first half of the album, was unveiled on 17 October 2016. The full short film for Fairy Dust was released on 31 October 2016. A short film for the second half of the album, titled Fire Fade, was released on 25 August 2017.

== Critical reception ==
Professional ratings
Aggregate scores
Source	Rating
Metacritic	74/100
Review scores
Source	Rating
AllMusic	3/5 stars
DIY	4/5 stars
Entertainment Weekly	A−
NME	4/5 stars
The Observer	3/5 stars
Pitchfork	7.0/10
Rolling Stone	3.5/5 stars
Slant Magazine	3.5/5 stars

Lady Wood received generally positive reviews from critics. At Metacritic, which assigns a normalised rating out of 100 to reviews from mainstream publications, the album received an average score of 74, based on 16 reviews. Entertainment Weekly's Madison Vain praised the album as "the darkest, weirdest, most irresistible pop record of the fall" and wrote, "While Lo's lyrics are stark and intensely personal, the music sounds engineered for the masses." Writing for NME, Nick Levine commented that "[s]ome listeners may not warm to Lo's persona, but her songwriting skills are difficult to fault", adding that "she keeps the hooks coming throughout as her hip, minimal electro-pop quivers, shimmers, pulses and throbs." Alim Kheraj of DIY noted that "Lady Wood isn't an album made for radio or easy digestion. The hooks are there but, like Tove herself, they aren't succumbing expectations."

Jon Dolan of Rolling Stone opined that the album "doesn't have anything that hits quite as hard as 'Stay High (Habits)' [sic] and 'Talking Body' [...] But its minimalist tech-house sound has a darkly textured allure". Heather Phares of AllMusic remarked that "despite its provocative title, [Lady Wood] often feels more straightforward than Queen of the Clouds did." Sal Cinquemani of Slant Magazine concluded that "Lady Wood is admirably lean and tightly focused, and though it doesn't boast confessionals on the order of Like a Prayer's, it offers a peek inside the psyche of a smart, burgeoning young star." Katherine St. Asaph of Pitchfork stated that "Lady Wood is short, but Lo finds ample darkness to plumb." The Observer's Kitty Empire expressed that "Lady Wood is, if anything, classier than Queen of the Clouds. But it might not sell so well, in that it lacks the sleazy catnip—the sex clubs, the self-abasement—displayed in the latter's defining singles."

== Track listing ==
Lady Wood – standard edition
No.	Title	Writer(s)	Producer(s)	Length
1.	"Fairy Dust"	Ludvig Söderberg		0:57
2.	"Influence" (featuring Wiz Khalifa)	Tove Lo; Söderberg; Jakob Jerlström; Wiz Khalifa	The Struts	3:44
3.	"Lady Wood"	Lo; Oscar Holter; Söderberg	Holter; Söderberg	3:19
4.	"True Disaster"	Lo; Holter	Holter	3:44
5.	"Cool Girl"	Lo; Söderberg; Jerlström	The Struts	3:19
6.	"Vibes" (featuring Joe Janiak)	Lo; Söderberg; Jerlström; Janiak	The Struts	3:46
7.	"Fire Fade"	Ilya Salmanzadeh		0:52
8.	"Don't Talk About It"	Lo; Ilya; Rickard Göransson	Ilya	3:54
9.	"Imaginary Friend"	Lo; Söderberg; Jerlström; Joel Little	Little; The Struts	4:12
10.	"Keep It Simple"	Lo; Ali Payami	Payami	3:51
11.	"Flashes"	Lo; Oscar Görres	Görres	4:16
12.	"WTF Love Is"	Lo; Söderberg; Jerlström	The Struts	3:41
Total length:				39:35

Lady Wood – Target exclusive edition bonus tracks
No.	Title	Writer(s)	Producer(s)	Length
13.	"Cool Girl" (The Knocks remix)	Lo; Söderberg; Jerlström	The Struts; The Knocks^{[a]}	5:00
14.	"True Disaster" (Hyperbits remix)	Lo; Holter	Holter; Hyperbits^{[a]}	3:34
15.	"Influence" (Chords remix) (featuring Wiz Khalifa)	Lo; Söderberg; Jerlström; Wiz Khalifa	The Struts; Chords^{[a]}	3:43
Total length:				51:12

Lady Wood and Blue Lips – deluxe vinyl exclusive 10-inch picture disc
No.	Title	Writer(s)	Producer(s)	Length
1.	"Cool Girl" (Timbaland remix)	Lo; Söderberg; Jerlström	The Struts; Timbaland^{[a]}
2.	"WTF Love Is" (Karma Fields remix)	Lo; Söderberg; Jerlström	The Struts; Karma Fields^{[a]}
3.	"Cycles" (MK remix)	Lo; Söderberg; Jerlström; Janiak	The Struts; MK^{[a]}
4.	"Bitches" (featuring Charli XCX, Icona Pop, Elliphant and Alma)	Lo; Payami; Elliphant; Nicki Adamsson	Payami

Notes

- ^{^[a]} signifies a remixer
- On some track listings “Lady Wood” track time is 3:36, making it transition to “True Disaster” making that song 3:24.

== Personnel ==
Credits adapted from the liner notes of Lady Wood.

=== Musicians ===
- Tove Lo – vocals (tracks 2–6, 8–12)
- Wiz Khalifa – vocals (track 2)
- The Struts – programming, bass, keyboards, guitars, percussion (tracks 2, 5, 6, 9, 12)
- Oscar Holter – programming, bass, keyboards, guitars, percussion (tracks 3, 4)
- Ludvig Söderberg – programming, bass, keyboards, guitars, percussion (track 3)
- Joe Janiak – vocals, guitar (track 6)
- Ilya – programming, arrangement, bass, keyboards, guitars, percussion (track 8)
- Joel Little – programming, bass, keyboards, guitars, percussion (track 9)
- Ali Payami – programming, drums, keyboards, bass, guitar, all other instrumentation (track 10)
- Oscar Görres – programming, bass, keyboards, guitars, percussion (track 11)

=== Technical ===
- The Struts – production (tracks 2, 5, 6, 9, 12)
- Noah Passovoy – vocal recording (track 2)
- Oscar Holter – production (tracks 3, 4)
- Ludvig Söderberg – production (track 3); executive production
- Ilya – production (track 8)
- Sam Holland – engineering (track 8)
- Jeremy Lertola – engineering assistance (track 8)
- Cory Bice – engineering assistance (track 8)
- Joel Little – production (track 9)
- Ali Payami – production (track 10)
- Oscar Görres – production (track 11)
- Tove Lo – executive production
- Serban Ghenea – mixing
- John Hanes – engineering for mix
- Tom Coyne – mastering
- Randy Merrill – mastering assistance

=== Artwork ===
- Tim Erem – creative direction
- Tove Lo – creative direction
- Samuel Burgess-Johnson – art direction, design
- Serena Neo – art direction, design
- Matt Jones – photography

== Charts ==
=== Weekly charts ===
Weekly chart performance for Lady Wood
Chart (2016)	Peak position
Australian Albums (ARIA)	21
Belgian Albums (Ultratop Flanders)	45
Belgian Albums (Ultratop Wallonia)	60
Canadian Albums (Billboard)	14
Danish Albums (Hitlisten)	13
Dutch Albums (Album Top 100)	28
Finnish Albums (Suomen virallinen lista)	20
French Albums (SNEP)	133
German Albums (Offizielle Top 100)	66
Irish Albums (IRMA)	32
New Zealand Albums (RMNZ)	16
Norwegian Albums (VG-lista)	7
Scottish Albums (Official Charts)	64
Spanish Albums (Promusicae)	63
Swedish Albums (Sverigetopplistan)	1
Swiss Albums (Schweizer Hitparade)	40
UK Albums (Official Charts)	40
US Billboard 200	11

=== Year-end charts ===
Year-end chart performance for Lady Wood
Chart (2017)	Position
Swedish Albums (Sverigetopplistan)	87

== Certifications ==
Certifications for Lady Wood
Region	Certification	Certified units/sales
New Zealand (RMNZ)	Gold	7,500^{‡}
^{‡} Sales+streaming figures based on certification alone.

== Release history ==
Release dates and formats for Lady Wood
Region	Date	Version(s)	Format(s)	Label	Ref.
Various	28 October 2016	Standard	CD; digital download; streaming	Island	
United States	28 October 2016	Target exclusive	CD	Island	
United States	11 November 2016	Standard	LP	Island	
Various	17 December 2018	Standard	LP (with Blue Lips)	Island	
