= Out of My Head (Charli XCX song) =

2017 single by Charli XCX featuring Tove Lo and Alma

Single by Charli XCX featuring Tove Lo and Alma

from the album Pop 2
- Released: 8 December 2017
- Genre: Dance-pop
- Length: 3:56
- Label: Asylum; Atlantic UK
- Songwriters: Charlotte Aitchison; Alexander Guy Cook; Sophie Xeon; Ebba Tove Nilsson; Alma Miettinen
- Producers: A. G. Cook; Sophie

Charli XCX singles chronology
"Dirty Sexy Money" (2017)	"Out of My Head" (2017)	"Girls" (2018)

Tove Lo singles chronology
"Disco Tits" (2017)	"Out of My Head" (2017)	"Colorblind" (2018)

Alma singles chronology
"Phases" (2017)	"Out of My Head" (2017)	"Bitches" (2018)

Audio video
- "Out of My Head" on YouTube

"Out of My Head" is a song by British singer Charli XCX, featuring Swedish singer Tove Lo and Finnish singer Alma. It was released as the lead single from her fourth mixtape Pop 2 on 8 December 2017 by Asylum Records and Atlantic Records UK.

== Background and release ==
On December 7, 2017, Charli XCX announced her new mixtape, Pop 2, after teasing the concept a few days earlier on Twitter. The song premiered the next day on BBC Radio 1. In an Instagram post, Charli XCX shared that she first began working on the song at Sophie's house and originally planned for it to be released by Alma, but eventually decided to use it for herself. She maintained Alma on the song and brought in Tove Lo to write the verse lyrics and perform on the song.

== Reception ==
"Out of My Head" received universal praise from critics. In a review naming Pop 2 "Best New Album," Meaghan Garvey of Pitchfork called it a song that "makes you want to slam a Strawberita and dance all night." For The Guardian, Alexis Petridis compared "Out of My Head" favorably against other chart toppers, saying that it and "Unlock It" sound like "hit singles from a slightly more adventurous, expansive alternate universe than the one the charts currently inhabit." Kirsten Spruch of Billboard named the track the best collaboration of Charli XCX's catalogue.

== Charts ==
Chart (2018)	Peak position
New Zealand Heatseekers (RMNZ)	6
