= Cycles (song) =

Promotional single by Tove Lo

from the album Blue Lips
- Released: 17 November 2017
- Genre: Synth-pop
- Length: 3:28
- Label: Republic
- Songwriters: Tove Lo; Joe Janiak; Ludvig Söderberg; Jakob Jerlström
- Producer: The Struts

"Cycles" (stylized as "cycles" on the tracklist) is a song by Swedish singer-songwriter Tove Lo, from her third studio album, Blue Lips (2017). It was released on the 17th of November, 2017 as a promotional single, through Republic Records. It was written by Lo herself, alongside Joe Janiak, Ludvig Söderberg and produced by The Struts.

Lyrically, the synth-pop record talks about being trapped in a never-ending relationship loop. Upon the release of Blue Lips, the song was received positively by music critics. Commercially, the song peaked at number 7 on the Veckolista Heatseeker chart in Sweden. A music video directed by Malia James was released on 4 December 2018.

== Composition ==
"Cycles" is a three-minute, twenty-eight-second synth-pop song, written by Tove Lo, Joe Janiak, Ludvig Söderberg and produced by The Sturts. Written in the key of G major, "Cycles" has a tempo of 105 beats per minute and features "baby-cry production, is dripping with self-deprecation." Lyrically, the song is about being trapped in a never-ending relationship loop, indicated by the lines: "How can I change it when I don't know when I'm in it?/ I'm in a cycle/ Swear this is different/ Don't wanna end it/ If you leave then I keep spinnin'". According to Xavier Piedra from Billboard she "sings in the chorus while she holds her head in frustration."

== Critical reception ==
Danny Madion of The Michigan Daily wrote that the song "walks listeners through a narrative of falling in love with an ex-lover. It's sad and earnest but doesn't lead to a notable chorus you’d sing in the car.". Alex Clarke of The Observer described "Cycles" and "Stranger" as "honest depictions of love that are nothing in the way of cliché."

== Music video ==
The music video for "Cycles" was directed by Malia James and it was released on 4 December 2018 on her Vevo channel. It was filmed as a one-shot and it was initially previewed in her short film Blue Lips in the post-credits scene where she spins around in a chair while the camera circles around her in blurry motion while lights are flashing all over her body.

== Credits and personnel ==
Credits adapted from Tidal.

- Tove Lo − vocals, songwriter
- Ludvig Söderberg − songwriter
- Joe Janiak − songwriter
- Jakob Jerlström − songwriter, backing vocalist
- The Struts − producer, programmer
- Chris Gehringer − mastering engineer
- John Hanes − assistant mixer
- Serban Ghenea − mixer

== Charts ==
Chart (2017)	Peak position
Sweden (Veckolista Heatseeker)	7
