= Cool Girl =

Single by Tove Lo

from the album Lady Wood
- Released: 4 August 2016
- Recorded: 2016
- Genre: Electropop
- Length: 3:19
- Label: Island; Republic
- Songwriters: Tove Nilsson; Jakob Jerlström; Ludvig Söderberg
- Producer: The Struts

Tove Lo singles chronology
| "Say It" (2016) | "Cool Girl" (2016) | "True Disaster" (2016) |

Music video
- "Cool Girl" on YouTube

"Cool Girl" is a song recorded by Swedish singer-songwriter Tove Lo for her second studio album Lady Wood (2016). Lo co-wrote the song with its producers Jakob Jerlström and Ludvig Söderberg, who are known collectively as The Struts. The track was released for digital download and streaming on 4 August 2016 as the album's lead single. It was released to contemporary hit radio stations in the United States on 23 August and three days later in the United Kingdom.

"Cool Girl" is a downtempo electropop song with elements of techno and house music. Its lyrics were inspired by a monologue spoken by the character Amy Elliott-Dunne in the 2014 film Gone Girl. According to Lo, the lyrics are about the games people play in a relationship because they are scared to be vulnerable. Critics had diverse opinions about the track's meanings, with some of them noting its themes of casual relationships. The song received positive reviews, commending its production and lyrical themes. "Cool Girl" entered the top 30 in Australia, Denmark, New Zealand and Sweden. It was certified platinum in Sweden and gold in Australia, Denmark and New Zealand.

A music video for "Cool Girl" premiered on 19 August 2016 as the first installment of the Tim Erem-directed short film Fairy Dust, which features six songs from Lady Wood. In the clip, Lo dances in a motel parking lot with a group of dancers while in another scene she is seen shaven-headed and writhing on top of a glass coffin in a desert. Lo performed "Cool Girl" in 2016 on television shows The Tonight Show with Jimmy Fallon, Sweden's Idol and The X Factor Australia. Lo's performance on Idol garnered negative reviews from viewers, who criticized the singer for touching her crotch on a family-friendly show. Lo later included "Cool Girl" on the set list of her Lady Wood Tour in 2017.

== Background and development ==
The writing process for "Cool Girl" started when Tove Lo was taking a day off during her Queen of the Clouds Tour (2015) in Copenhagen, Denmark. At her hotel, Lo received a bass line from producers Jakob Jerlström and Ludvig Söderberg, who are known collectively as The Struts. They asked Lo if she wanted to write lyrics to it. Lo liked the track and set up her bedroom studio and started listening to it repeatedly. She had recently watched the film Gone Girl (2014) and analyzed the "Cool Girl" monologue by a character portrayed by Rosamund Pike, who talks about being a "cool girl". Lo said; "I just remember this monologue ... where [Pike's character] says she's changed a lot [of] things about herself to become someone that she thought her husband would want". Inspired by that scene, Lo wrote the melody, chorus and pre-chorus with sarcastic lyrics and sent the track to The Struts. In early 2016, Lo and The Struts reunited in Stockholm to finish the song.

"Cool Girl" was written by Tove Lo and The Struts, who also produced it, programmed it and played the bass guitar, keyboards, guitars and percussion instruments. They recorded the track at Wolf Cousins Studios in Stockholm. John Hanes engineered the song while Serban Ghenea mixed it at MixStar Studios in Virginia Beach, Virginia. Tom Coyne mastered it with assistance of Randy Merrill at Sterling Sound Studios in New York City.

== Music and lyrics ==
"Cool Girl" is a downtempo electropop song that incorporates elements of techno and house music, with a length of three minutes and nineteen seconds. Its instrumentation incorporates a deep synthesizer bass line. It is written in the key of A minor and set in common time signature with a tempo of 102 beats per minute. Lo's vocals range from the low note of E_{3} to the high note of D_{5}. During the chorus, a synthesizer riff is played and vocal inflections are used in the background. "Cool Girl" is divided into two chapters, "Fairy Dust' (the high) and "Fire Fade" (the comedown), and is included in the first chapter of Lady Wood, which discusses the "early stages of attraction" of relationships. Lo said the musical style of the track was inspired by the music played at the minimal techno raves she had attended during the two years before writing the song.

According to Lo, a "cool girl" is somebody who is "honest, and real, and doesn't apologize for who she is, and just doesn't let anyone else affect who she should be". She said the lyrics of "Cool Girl" were written in a sarcastic, ironic way, and that they talk about the "games that we play in a relationship because we are so scared to be vulnerable". She added, "It's almost like you stay cold and don't really show your emotions to kind of have the upper hand". In the chorus, "I'm a cool girl / I'm a, I'm a cool girl / Ice cold, I roll my eyes at you, boy", Lo's narrator uses irony to trick her partner into thinking she does not care about his actions. She told Genius, "Obviously I care, I would not even be rolling my eyes. I guess it's just the usual way of adding to the story of the game. You always try to act like you don't care but that's all, you do really." During the bridge, "I got fever highs / I got boiling blood / I'm that fire kind / We could burn together", Lo's narrator admits she is not a "cool girl" and that she prefers to have a passionate connection with her lover.

Critics had diverse opinions about the meaning of the track. Writing for The Guardian, Alexandra Pollard noted the song's sarcastic tone and concluded the lyrics are about the false lack of interest people—especially women—are expected to show at the beginning of a relationship. Brittany Spanos of Rolling Stone said "Cool Girl" describes the "varying roles and expectations in casual relationships" while Kyann-Sian Williams of NME stated the lyrics are about stripping the labels in a relationship where the protagonist does not want commitment. Alim Kheraj from DIY labelled "Cool Girl" as a "non-conformist anthem" in which the narrator prefers "lusty casualness" over monogamy. In contrast, Jenesaispop's Jordi Bardají concluded the song talks about the desire for freedom in a relationship, as indicated in the verses, "We don't put a label on it, so we can run free, yeah". Similarly, Bustle's Amy Mackelden said Lo's narrator prefers to have a casual relationship, as indicated by the lines, "No, let's not put a label on it, let's keep it fun". She also noted the lyric "I wanna be free like you" hints at the "outdated expectations often placed on women to only be in monogamous relationships".

== Release ==
On 20 July 2016, Tove Lo posted several pictures that included the lyrics of a new song using the hashtag "soon" to her Instagram account. Five days later, also on Instagram, she uploaded two animated GIF images with the same lyrics and hashtag as the previous post. On 29 July, on Twitter, Lo revealed her new single was called "Cool Girl" and uploaded a seven-second instrumental of the track and announced its release date. It was made available for digital download and streaming on 4 August 2016 as the lead single from Lo's second studio album Lady Wood (2016). Six days later, Republic Records announced "Cool Girl" would be sent to US contemporary hit radio stations on 23 August 2016, and in the United Kingdom on 26 August 2016. The single's artwork depicts Lo licking a doughnut, which Idolator's Carl Williott said is something only Lo could have done. Writing for the same website, Robbie Daw said "Cool Girl" is "an understated song for a lead single from a major artist".

In an interview with iHeart Radio, Lo said she selected "Cool Girl" as Lady Wood's first single because she felt it is a "great introduction" to the album that exemplifies its mix of pop melodies and personal lyrics with "minimal and aggressive" beats. She added, "it was fun to come out with something that wasn't a knife-to-the-heart twist like most of the last record". The day before its release, New Zealand singer Lorde praised "Cool Girl" on Twitter, calling it the "pop song of the summer". Lo told the BBC, "I was very excited because [Lorde is] such a great writer. There's so many female pop artists out there and everyone's supporting each other, which I think is really cool."

== Critical reception ==
Heather Phares of AllMusic selected "Cool Girl" as a "track pick" for Lady Wood, saying it sets the musical tone for the rest of the record. Amy Mackelden of Bustle considered it the "perfect summer anthem" because of its "bold" lyrics and praised the track's themes about casual relationships. Kyann-Sian Williams from NME included "Cool Girl" on his list of Tove Lo's seven greatest songs and said the "contrast of the slow and mellow verses compared to the liveliness of the refrain" makes the song "great". Entertainment Weekly's Madison Vain called the song "pop gold" while Fuse's Bianca Gracie labelled it a strong contender for song of the summer and said it has an "undeniably infectious hook". Evan Sawdey of PopMatters called "Cool Girl" a "wobbly single" that "struts in a deep funk that stands out from the rest of the album".

Newsday's Glenn Gamboa said "Cool Girl" is a stylish song that shows "how crafty [Lo] can be with her lyrics when the groove, offered by producers The Struts, is unstoppable". The staff of Jenesaispop called it a groundbreaking track with a subtle hook and elegant production. Katherine St. Asaph of Pitchfork said the song has a sassy, "stuttery" chorus and added that Lo emulates Sia during the bridge. Writing for The Line of Best Fit, Ed Nash labeled "Cool Girl" one of "pop anthems of the entire year" because of its "infectious" chorus. The staff of website Idolator reviewed "Cool Girl"; Robbie Daw said it has a subtle, club-friendly charm and Rachel Sonis called it a "sarcastic, flirty anthem". Mike Wass was more critical, saying "Cool Girl" is neither the song of the summer nor the track of the week. According to Beth Bowles from Exclaim!, although "Cool Girl" is catchy, it "felt like the product of a record label".

== Commercial performance ==
Sebas E. Alonso of Jenesaispop noted "Cool Girl" was not as successful in North America as Lo's previous singles "Habits (Stay High)" (2013) and "Talking Body" (2015). The single debuted at number 84 on the US Billboard Hot 100 in its opening week. Two weeks later, following the release of its music video, the track re-entered the chart at number 88. The song spent five non-consecutive weeks on the Hot 100 and also reached number 39 on the Pop Songs list. The song peaked at number 42 on the Canadian Hot 100 chart.

"Cool Girl" also charted in several European countries. In Sweden, the song entered the Singles Top 100 chart at number 16 on 12 August 2016. The following week, it peaked at number 15, spending sixteen weeks on the chart. It received a platinum certification from the Swedish Recording Industry Association (GLF) for selling 40,000 units in the country. On 18 August 2016, "Cool Girl" entered the UK Singles Chart at number 55. It spent eight weeks on the chart, where it peaked at number 46. The song was certified silver by the British Phonographic Industry (BPI) the week of 7 July 2017 for selling 200,000 units in the UK. In Denmark, "Cool Girl" peaked at number 26 on the Track Top 40 chart and was certified gold by the IFPI Danmark for selling 45,000 copies there. In Germany, the single peaked at number 43 on the Top 100 Singles chart and was certified gold by the Bundesverband Musikindustrie (BVMI), denoting sales of 200,000 units in the country.

In France, "Cool Girl" reached number 145 and the Syndicat National de l'Édition Phonographique (SNEP) certified it gold for selling 66,666 copies in the country. The song entered Spain's Top 100 Canciones chart at number 96 in the week of 31 August 2016, and peaked at number 79 on 18 September that year. The track charted for two weeks on the Italian Singles Chart, reaching number 49. It was awarded a gold certification from the Federazione Industria Musicale Italiana (FIMI) for sales exceeding 25,000 copies in the country. "Cool Girl" also reached the top 30 in Norway and the digital singles charts in the Czech Republic and Slovakia. It also received a platinum certification from the Polish Society of the Phonographic Industry (ZPAV) for selling 20,000 units in Poland.

In Australia, "Cool Girl" debuted at number 52 on the ARIA Singles Chart in its opening week. It peaked at number 30 and received a gold certification from the Australian Recording Industry Association (ARIA) for selling 35,000 units there. In New Zealand, the song reached number 15 and spent fourteen weeks on the Top 40 Singles chart. Recorded Music NZ (RMNZ) certified the track platinum, denoting sales of 30,000 equivalent copies in the country.

== Music video ==
=== Background and release ===
The music video for "Cool Girl" premiered on 19 August 2016 on Tove Lo's Vevo channel. It was released as the first installment of the Tim Erem-directed short film, Fairy Dust, which features the songs from the first chapter of Lady Wood. Erem met Lo at the 2015 edition of the Coachella festival and directed her music video for "Moments" (2015). He agreed to do the creative directorial work with the singer because he considered her "one of the most creative artist I've ever met" and said; "She always wants to do something new. She always wants to be outside the box."

The film was co-written by Lo and Erem, and was filmed in five days in Los Angeles. Lo said the filming was exhausting because Erem pushed her to film more scenes than she was accustomed to; she said, "I'm way more exhausted after five days of shooting videos than I am after a whole tour. I guess I like to torture myself. And also Tim loves to torture me." Fairy Dust stars Lo and Lina Esco, who plays Lo's "self-destructive alter ego".

=== Synopsis ===
Two scenes from the music video for "Cool Girl". Above, the singer appears dancing in a motel parking lot alongside back-up dancers. Below, she is shown with her head shaved while writhing on a glass coffin containing Lina Esco's character. It represents Lo's freedom from her self-destructive side.

According to Tove Lo, the "Cool Girl" segment of Fairy Dust represents freedom from her "self-destructive side", which is portrayed by Esco, with whom she has a "love and hate relationship". The music video for "Cool Girl" begins with a sequence of scenes representing the other videos from Fairy Dust. Lo is in her motel room shaving her head. After this, she dances on a car in the parking lot. A group of dancers later appear inside the car then leave it to perform a dance alongside Lo. Lo said she wanted to include choreography in the music video to match the song's "sarcastic and cheeky" themes.

Other scenes in the video show Lo with a shaven head in a desert while writhing on the top of a glass coffin containing Esco's character; this scene represents Lo's freedom from her self-destructive side. Publications such as Fuse, Jenesaispop and Much said this scene represents the death of the singer's past self. After the song's bridge, the music pauses and Lo sets light to her motel room while saying, "Pain and pleasure go hand in hand, they say. But no one mentions that pain is really just a path to more pleasure. No more fear." Later scenes in the music video include a car crash and it ends with the text "to be continued".

=== Reception ===
Scandipop considered the music video for "Cool Girl" to be "epic" while Elvis Duran and the Morning Show called the video "disturbing" and "bizarre". Jake Viswanath of V said the synopsis of the music video is confusing and that the context of the clip could be understood within the Fairy Dust movie. Viswanath praised the "sensual, acrobatic" choreography and said it "perfectly encapsulates the brooding and passionate tones of Lady Wood".

Some critics noted the video's similarities to the film Gone Girl. Bianca Gracie of Fuse said the singer "completely owns that twisted mindset" of the "Cool Girl" monologue of Gone Girl. Writing for Entertainment Weekly, Dana Getz stated the video is a "lawless take" on the song and that it "builds upon the song's Gone Girl-inspired lyricism". Marissa Martinelli of Slate said Lo's role in the music video was inspired by Gone Girl's character Amy Dunne while Patricia García of Vogue wrote, "much like the 2014 thriller, the music clip features a woman going on what seems to be a revenge rampage". Isis Briones of Teen Vogue stated the scene in which Lo shaves her head parallels the moment Amy Dunne "starts to snap" in Gone Girl.

== Live performances ==
Tove Lo's first television performance of "Cool Girl" was on The Tonight Show with Jimmy Fallon on 31 August 2016. She also sang the track at the Lady Wood and Fairy Dust premiere party on 28 October 2016 in Hollywood, California. On 4 November, Lo performed the song on the Swedish television show Idol 2016. She wore a T-shirt, a sweater, and black underwear, and while she sang she briefly touched her crotch as a homage to Michael Jackson's dancing routines. Her performance, which was recorded one hour before being broadcast on TV4, was criticised by viewers who deemed it too sexual for a family-friendly television show. Clara Tengbom, executive producer of Idol 2016, told the newspaper Expressen TV4 decided to broadcast the entire performance because they felt it was "important" the singer was not censored. Tengbom added, "We are very proud to have Tove Lo on Idol. She is one of our worldwide Swedish artists at the moment and she demonstrated why on the show. Her artistic and musical expression is hers, but of course it is sad that viewers had a bad reaction." Lo wrote a post about the controversy on her Facebook account, saying she was shocked by the viewers' reactions because she considered Sweden a country that "has come so much further in terms of equality between men and women, as well as women's sexuality". She later told BBC Radio 1's Newsbeat, "Touching yourself is the least harmful thing you can do. It's just you and your body enjoying yourself. There's no harm coming out of that."

On 8 November, Lo performed "Cool Girl" and a cover of Glass Animals' song "Life Itself" (2016) with an accompanying band on BBC Radio 1's segment Live Lounge. The staff of Virgin Radio France stated Lo sang a "more elegant version" of "Cool Girl" than usual. On 21 November, the singer performed "Cool Girl" on The X Factor Australia; she wore a bomber jacket and a bathing suit while singing and dancing on a barely illuminated stage. Rachel Sonis praised the performance, saying Lo "dazzled the crowd" and "effortlessly crooned her song's sultry lyrics" while dancing in her outfits. Kevin Apaza of Direct Lyrics complimented the singer's vocal rendition but criticized the stage lighting, saying he could not see Lo's face properly. The next day, the singer performed the track at an iHeartRadio Australia event wearing a low-cut, leather leotard.

"Cool Girl" was included on the set list of Lo's second tour, the Lady Wood Tour, in 2017. She performed the track wearing a latex bodysuit while swaying and doing a striptease. Matthew Kent of The Independent wrote a mixed review of the song's rendition at the O2 Ritz in Manchester, calling it one of the set's "kinks" and adding, "Chilled out Lady Wood lead 'Cool Girl' is a mission statement on record, but it doesn't quite deliver live as it lacks the massive hooks that would be better suited at this end of the set". On 24 March 2017, Lo performed "Cool Girl" as part of the encore of a show in São Paulo, Brazil. On 4 April, the singer performed the song at Lollapalooza Chile. She sang "Cool Girl" at the Osheaga Festival 2017 in Montreal, Canada, on 4 August. Lo included the track on the set list of her Sunshine Kitty Tour in 2020.

== Credits and personnel ==
Credits adapted from the liner notes of Lady Wood.

Locations

- Recorded at the Wolf Cousins Studios in Stockholm, Sweden.
- Mixed at MixStar Studios in Virginia Beach, Virginia.
- Mastered at Sterling Sound Studios in New York City.

Personnel

- Tove Lo – lead vocals
- Tove Lo, Jakob Jerlström, Ludvig Söderberg – songwriting
- The Struts – production, programming, guitars, bass, keyboards, percussion instruments
- Serban Ghenea – mixing
- John Hanes – mix engineer
- Tom Coyne – mastering
- Randy Merrill – mastering assistance

== Charts ==
=== Weekly charts ===
Weekly chart performance
| Chart (2016) | Peak position |
|---|---|
| Australia (ARIA) | 30 |
| Austria (Ö3 Austria Top 40) | 53 |
| Belgium (Ultratip Bubbling Under Flanders) | 7 |
| Belgium (Ultratip Bubbling Under Wallonia) | 15 |
| Canada Hot 100 (Billboard) | 42 |
| Canada CHR/Top 40 (Billboard) | 41 |
| CIS Airplay (TopHit) | 53 |
| Czech Republic Singles Digital (ČNS IFPI) | 28 |
| Denmark (Tracklisten) | 26 |
| Finland Airplay (Radiosoittolista) | 42 |
| Finland Streaming (Streamlista) | 38 |
| France (SNEP) | 145 |
| Germany (GfK) | 43 |
| Hungary (Stream Top 40) | 35 |
| Ireland (IRMA) | 32 |
| Italy (FIMI) | 49 |
| Netherlands (Dutch Top 40) | 35 |
| Netherlands (Single Top 100) | 44 |
| New Zealand (Recorded Music NZ) | 15 |
| Norway (VG-lista) | 22 |
| Portugal (AFP) | 37 |
| Russia Airplay (TopHit) | 61 |
| Scotland Singles (OCC) | 43 |
| Slovakia Airplay (ČNS IFPI) | 69 |
| Slovakia Singles Digital (ČNS IFPI) | 18 |
| Spain (Promusicae) | 79 |
| Sweden (Sverigetopplistan) | 15 |
| Switzerland (Schweizer Hitparade) | 49 |
| UK Singles (OCC) | 46 |
| US Billboard Hot 100 | 84 |
| US Pop Airplay (Billboard) | 39 |

=== Year-end charts ===
Annual chart rankings
| Chart (2016) | Position |
|---|---|
| Australia (ARIA Streaming Tracks Chart) | 79 |

== Certifications ==
Certifications and sales
| Region | Certification | Certified units/sales |
|---|---|---|
| Australia (ARIA) | Gold | 35,000^{‡} |
| Brazil (Pro-Música Brasil) | Platinum | 60,000^{‡} |
| Denmark (IFPI Danmark) | Platinum | 90,000^{‡} |
| France (SNEP) | Gold | 66,666^{‡} |
| Germany (BVMI) | Gold | 200,000^{‡} |
| Italy (FIMI) | Gold | 25,000^{‡} |
| New Zealand (RMNZ) | Platinum | 30,000^{‡} |
| Poland (ZPAV) | Platinum | 20,000^{‡} |
| Sweden (GLF) | Platinum | 40,000^{‡} |
| United Kingdom (BPI) | Silver | 200,000^{‡} |
| United States (RIAA) | Platinum | 1,000,000^{‡} |
^{‡} Sales+streaming figures based on certification alone.

== Release history ==
Street dates
| Region | Date | Format(s) | Label | Ref. |
|---|---|---|---|---|
| Various | 4 August 2016 | Digital download | Island | |
| United States | 23 August 2016 | Contemporary hit radio | Republic | |
| United Kingdom | 26 August 2016 | Contemporary hit radio | Island; Republic | |
