= Daye Jack =

American rapper (born 1996)

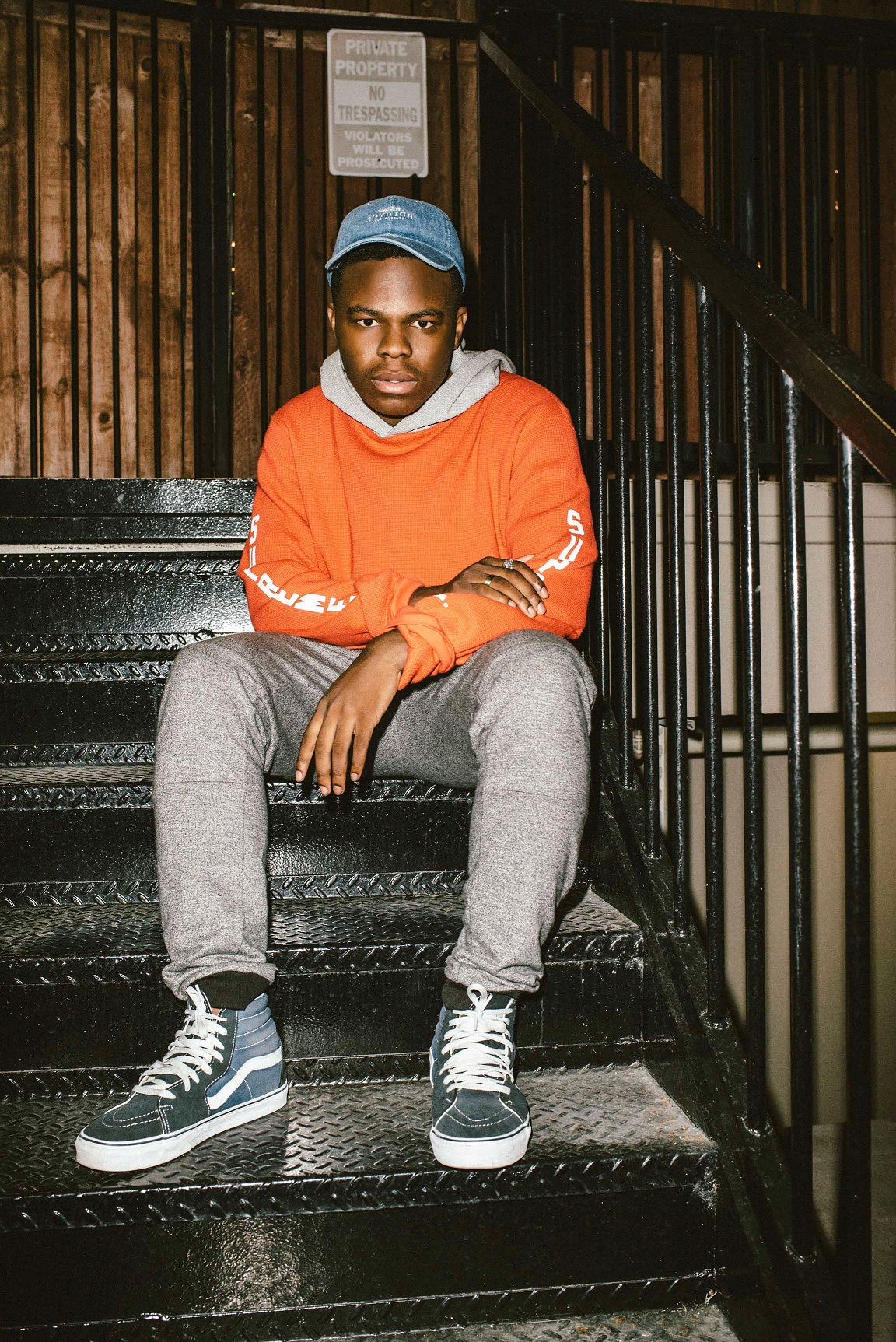

Background information
- Born: 1 February 1996 (age 30); Port Harcourt, Nigeria
- Origin: Atlanta, Georgia
- Genres: Hip Hop, Rap
- Label: Warner Bros. Records
- Website: DayeJack.com

Daye Jack is a Nigerian-American hip hop artist from Atlanta, Georgia. He is best known for his single "Hands Up" featuring Killer Mike which peaked at #14 on the Billboard Twitter Emerging Artists chart.

== Early life and education ==
Jack was born in Port Harcourt, the capital and largest city of Rivers State, Nigeria 1 February 1996. He grew up in Atlanta. His father was originally from Nigeria but grew up in California. His father later returned to Nigeria to marry Jack's mother and then moved back to Atlanta. Jack got involved in programming while in high school and went on to attend New York University. It was during his time at NYU that he began his music career.

== Career ==
Jack released his first mixtape, Hello World, at the age of 18 while attending NYU. He released it on SoundCloud and was soon contacted by numerous blogs who asked him to submit new music. Jack was contacted by producer Mike Elizondo and he flew to Los Angeles to perform some demos, eventually leading to a contract with Warner Bros. Records. In 2015 he released the EP Soul Glitch under the Warner Bros. label.

After the release of Soul Glitch, Jack collaborated with Killer Mike in 2015 for the release of the single Hands Up. The video was released exclusively on Billboard which called it "emotionally charged" with a "powerful message of solidarity." The video was released on the first day of Black History Month in 2016 and the song peaked at #14 on the Billboard Twitter Emerging Artists chart.

In addition to his collaboration with Killer Mike, Jack has worked with numerous other artists. In 2015 he was featured on the song Expensive from Tori Kelly's album Unbreakable Smile. Jack also sang background vocals for Ariana Grande's 2016 album Dangerous Woman. In early 2016, Jack toured nationally with Pell on the Only in Your Dreams tour, and also toured with Lukas Graham.

Jack released his first full-length project No Data in March 2017.

== Musical style ==
Jack attributes his musical style to his family background and has been described as a "hip-hop singer." He describes himself as making experimental hip-hop with rapping, singing, and speaking all being part of it. Jack cites some of his influencers as being André 3000 and 50 Cent.

== Discography ==
=== Albums ===
List of studio albums
Title	Album details
No Data	Released: March 24, 2017; Label: Warner Bros. Records; Format: Digital download, streaming
Preacherman and The Praise Team	Released: August 7, 2026; Label: Preacherman Records; Format: Digital download, streaming

=== Mixtapes ===
List of mixtapes
Title	Mixtape details
Soul Glitch	Released: June 29, 2015; Label: Warner; Format: Digital download

=== EPs ===
List of extended plays
Title	EP details
Surf the Web	Released: September 23, 2016; Label: Warner; Format: Digital download, streaming
Sinner's Prayer	Released: March 24, 2026; Label: Biblically Minded; Format: Digital download, streaming

==== As a lead artist ====
Title	Year	Album
"Trapped in Love"	2015	Soul Glitch
"Save My Soul"	2015	Soul Glitch
"Easy"	2015	Soul Glitch
"Piggybank"	2015	Non-album singles
"Rule the World"	2015	Non-album singles
"Hands Up" (featuring Killer Mike)	2015	Non-album singles
"Raw" (Note: The solo version of "Raw" is included as an EP track on Surf the Web, while the remix featuring Denzel Curry & Grim Dave is a part of Daye's debut album, No Data.) (solo or featuring Denzel Curry and Grim Dave)	2016	Surf the Web
"Finish Line" (Note: "Finish Line" is also included om Daye's debut album, No Data.)	2016	Surf the Web
"Deep End"	2016	Surf the Web
"Bullshit"	2016	Surf the Web
"Lady Villain"	2017	No Data
"Casino"	2017	No Data
"Heart Shaped Culdesac"	2018	Non-album single
"Can't Get Lukewarm"	2026	Preacherman and The Praise Team
"Thunder"	2026	Preacherman and The Praise Team

=== Guest Appearances ===
Title	Year	Other artist(s)	Album
"Expensive"	2015	Tori Kelly	Unbreakable Smile
"Romantics"	2017	Tove Lo	Blue Lips
