= Fairy Dust (film) =

- Official visual poster
- Directed by: Tim Erem
- Screenplay by: Tim Erem; Tove Lo
- Produced by: Ian Blair; Kimberly Stuckwisch; Tim Erem; Tove Lo
- Starring: Tove Lo; Lina Esco
- Cinematography: Steve Annis
- Edited by: Niles Howard; Tim Erem
- Music by: Wolf Cousins
- Production company: Diktator
- Distributed by: Universal Music Group
- Release date: October 31, 2016 (USA)
- Running time: 31 minutes
- Country: United States
- Language: English

Fairy Dust is a 2016 short film co-produced, co-written and starring Swedish singer-songwriter Tove Lo. The film coincides with the first "chapter", or first six songs, of Lo's second album, Lady Wood, which was released on October 28, 2016. The film was released on YouTube and Vevo on October 31, 2016.

== Plot ==
The film opens with Tove Lo (played by herself) returning to her motel room late at night. As she crosses the parking lot and ascends the stairs, she begins laughing maniacally, screaming in rage and crying shortly after (Fairy Dust – Chapter I).

The next morning, Lorna (Lina Esco) speaks negatively of women, motherhood and weddings and how much she enjoys being alone and that she's independent while smoking a cigarette. She hears the couple next door arguing and yells through the wall at them, telling the husband to stop being "a little bitch" and stating the wife is a hypocrite for being a feminist but wanting her sexual needs fulfilled. Lorna lies on the bed saying she has ways to numb the pain, with Tove lying with her. The two fornicate, cuddle and smoke marijuana together on the bed (Influence).

That night, Tove drives to a club. As she walks through the club, she wonders why "[it's] not working anymore" and that "it used to be enough as long as it was all the time". She sees Lorna across the room and begins to dance with the people around her, forming connections with them as they mimic her moves. At this, Lorna yells at Tove, only to have Tove retaliate with the help of her new friends. Eventually, Lorna and Tove reconcile, kissing as the lights flash (Lady Wood). After, Lorna and Tove drive back to the motel while Lorna recounts the first time they met when Tove was in love with an older man who did not reciprocate the feelings, leaving Tove alone with Lorna. Lorna begins to speak about how easy it is to die and forces Tove to crash her car, knocking her unconscious. When she wakes, Lorna is dousing the car in gasoline. Tove attempts to leave the scene several times, only to find herself back at the car wreck. There, Lorna sets fire to her clothes, killing herself (True Disaster).

Tove is later seen in her bathroom shaving her head. She dances around in the parking lot of the motel with the people she met at the club while her shaved head persona is burying Lorna in the desert. A short monologue reveals that while Tove is grieving the loss of Lorna, she believes pain to be a gateway to more pleasure, with pain removing fear and anxiety from an uncertain situation as she sets her motel room on fire (Cool Girl). While in the desert, she meets a guy and begins a relationship with him, with the two returning to the motel to have sex (Vibes). Afterwards, she sits outside her room and processes everything that's happened. A voiceover by Tove states that she feels like no one knows her.

In a scene during the credits, Tove is seen masturbating on her bed with Lorna watching her (Bitches).

== Cast ==
- Tove Lo as herself
- Lina Esco as Lorna
- Danny Axley as Desert Dancer
- Angelica Dewitt, Savannah Harrison, Ty Wells, Josue De La Vega as dancers

== Release ==
The film was released on Tove Lo's Vevo and YouTube accounts on October 31, 2016. The same day, the video was pulled from YouTube, which cited its sexual content. Lo responded on her Twitter profile by saying "So I did release #FairyDust today but it's been taken down cause of @YouTubes policies on sexual content. HA. #imnotevennaked".

== Soundtrack ==
1.	"Fairy Dust"
2.	"Influence" (featuring Wiz Khalifa)
3.	"Lady Wood"
4.	"True Disaster"
5.	"Cool Girl"
6.	"Vibes" (featuring Joe Janiak)
7.	"Bitches"
