= Talking Body =

2015 single by Tove Lo

Single by Tove Lo

from the album Queen of the Clouds
- Released: 13 January 2015
- Recorded: 2014
- Studio: MXM, Wolf Cousins (Stockholm)
- Genre: Electropop; dance-pop
- Length: 3:58
- Label: Island; Republic
- Songwriters: Tove Lo; Jakob Jerlström; Ludvig Söderberg
- Producers: The Struts; Shellback

Tove Lo singles chronology
| "Heroes" (2014) | "Talking Body" (2015) | "Come Back to Me" (2015) |

Music video
- "Talking Body" on YouTube

"Talking Body" is a song by Swedish singer and songwriter Tove Lo, released to American contemporary hit radio on 13 January 2015 by Republic Records. It served as the second single from her debut studio album, Queen of the Clouds (2014). It reached the top 20 in Canada, Finland, Sweden, the United Kingdom, and the United States.

== Composition ==
"Talking Body" was written by Lo, Jakob Jerlström and Ludvig Söderberg, while its production was handled by The Struts and Shellback. It is an electropop song, with elements of trip hop, synthpop and indie pop. Lyrically, the song is about trying to seduce someone into having sexual relations. The song plays in the key of E minor, at a tempo of 120 beats per minute. It has a chord sequence of Em-D-G-C-D.

== Critical reception ==
The song was praised for its impudence. Sam Lansky of Time wrote "Lo can be vulgar, as on the lusty 'Talking Body', which sets a scabrous singalong hook against some of Shellback's irresistibly catchy production, but that sexiness is shot through with frustration; she owns her desire, full-throttle."

== Music video and live performances ==
The music video was premiered on 12 January 2015.

Since 2015, many of her live performances of the song for a live audience involved "stripping her clothes or flashing the crowd".

== Chart performance ==
The song peaked at number 12 on the Billboard Hot 100, becoming her second top 20 entry after "Habits (Stay High)". Additionally, it peaked at number four on the Mainstream Top 40 charts, which lists the most played songs on pop radio stations. To date, the single has spent 30 weeks on the Hot 100, and has sold two million downloads. It has also peaked at number 14 in Canada. As for Europe, it has peaked at number 16 in Sweden, number 100 in Germany, number 17 on the UK Singles Chart and number eight in Scotland, becoming her third top 20 entry after "Habits (Stay High)" and "Heroes (We Could Be)" with Alesso.

== Track listing ==
- Digital EP – The Remixes
1. "Talking Body" (Gryffin Remix) – 4:29
2. "Talking Body" (Kream Remix) – 3:39
3. "Talking Body" (WDL Remix) – 3:41
4. "Talking Body" (Panic City Remix) – 4:46
5. "Talking Body" (The Young Professionals Remix) – 3:39

== Credits and personnel ==
- Tove Lo – vocals, background vocals, songwriting
- Ludvig Söderberg – writing
- Jakob Jerlström – writing
- The Struts, Shellback – producer

== Charts ==
=== Weekly charts ===
| Chart (2015) | Peak position |
|---|---|
| Australia (ARIA) | 95 |
| Belgium (Ultratip Bubbling Under Flanders) | 19 |
| Belgium (Ultratip Bubbling Under Wallonia) | 25 |
| Canada Hot 100 (Billboard) | 14 |
| Canada AC (Billboard) | 30 |
| Canada CHR/Top 40 (Billboard) | 7 |
| Canada Hot AC (Billboard) | 28 |
| Czech Republic Airplay (ČNS IFPI) | 52 |
| Czech Republic Singles Digital (ČNS IFPI) | 14 |
| Denmark (Tracklisten) | 26 |
| Finland (Suomen virallinen lista) | 13 |
| France Airplay (SNEP) | 87 |
| Germany (GfK) | 100 |
| Hungary (Stream Top 40) | 26 |
| Ireland (IRMA) | 41 |
| Netherlands (Single Top 100) | 74 |
| Scottish Singles Sales (Official Charts) | 8 |
| Slovakia Airplay (ČNS IFPI) | 49 |
| Slovakia Singles Digital (ČNS IFPI) | 24 |
| Spain (Promusicae) | 71 |
| Sweden (Sverigetopplistan) | 16 |
| UK Singles (Official Charts) | 17 |
| US Billboard Hot 100 | 12 |
| US Adult Contemporary (Billboard) | 23 |
| US Adult Pop Airplay (Billboard) | 8 |
| US Dance Club Songs (Billboard) | 1 |
| US Dance Airplay (Billboard) | 11 |
| US Pop Airplay (Billboard) | 4 |
| US Rhythmic Airplay (Billboard) | 31 |

| Chart (2026) | Peak position |
|---|---|
| Australia (ARIA) | 83 |
| Austria (Ö3 Austria Top 40) | 22 |
| Germany (GfK) | 57 |
| Global 200 (Billboard) | 97 |
| Norway (IFPI Norge) Kream remix | 34 |
| Poland Airplay (OLiS) | 18 |
| Poland Streaming (OLiS) | 88 |
| Slovakia Singles Digital (ČNS IFPI) | 80 |
| Sweden (Sverigetopplistan) | 25 |
| Switzerland (Schweizer Hitparade) | 73 |

=== Year-end charts ===
| Chart (2015) | Position |
|---|---|
| Canada (Canadian Hot 100) | 50 |
| Denmark (Tracklisten) | 62 |
| Sweden (Sverigetopplistan) | 48 |
| US Billboard Hot 100 | 37 |
| US Adult Top 40 (Billboard) | 36 |
| US Dance Club Songs (Billboard) | 5 |
| US Dance/Mix Show Airplay (Billboard) | 36 |
| US Mainstream Top 40 (Billboard) | 18 |

== Certifications ==
| Region | Certification | Certified units/sales |
|---|---|---|
| Brazil (Pro-Música Brasil) | 3× Platinum | 180,000^{‡} |
| Denmark (IFPI Danmark) | 2× Platinum | 180,000^{‡} |
| Germany (BVMI) | Gold | 200,000^{‡} |
| Italy (FIMI) | Gold | 25,000^{‡} |
| New Zealand (RMNZ) | 3× Platinum | 90,000^{‡} |
| United Kingdom (BPI) | Platinum | 600,000^{‡} |
| United States (RIAA) | 5× Platinum | 5,000,000^{‡} |
^{‡} Sales+streaming figures based on certification alone.

== Release history ==
| Region | Date | Format | Label | Ref. |
|---|---|---|---|---|
| United States | 13 January 2015 | Contemporary hit radio | Island; Republic | |
| United States | 23 March 2015 | Rhythmic contemporary radio | Island; Republic | |
| United Kingdom | 3 May 2015 | Digital download (Remixes EP) | Polydor | |
| United States | 26 May 2015 | Digital download (Remixes EP) | Island | |
| Canada | 26 May 2015 | Digital download (Remixes EP) | Universal | |

== See also ==
- List of number-one dance singles of 2015 (U.S.)
