= Tim Erem =

Swedish music video director

- Born: Timothy Frey Trond Erem; October 29, 1990 (age 34); Lidingö, Stockholm, Sweden
- Occupation(s): Director, music video director

Timothy Frey Trond Erem, better known as Tim Erem, (born October 29, 1990) is a Swedish director from Lidingö, Stockholm. He is best known for directing and writing music videos for artists such as Rihanna, Drake, Tove Lo, Elliphant, Katy Perry, MØ and Major Lazer.

== Works ==
Erem's music video for "Lean On", by Major Lazer and MØ, is the eighth most viewed video on YouTube. Erem is a part of the production company Diktator, which includes other reputable directors such as Andy Milonakis. He has directed the short film Fairy Dust where Swedish artist Tove Lo masturbates. The video he directed for "Work" by Rihanna and Drake was nominated for Best Female Video at the MTV Video Music Awards.
