= How Long (Tove Lo song) =

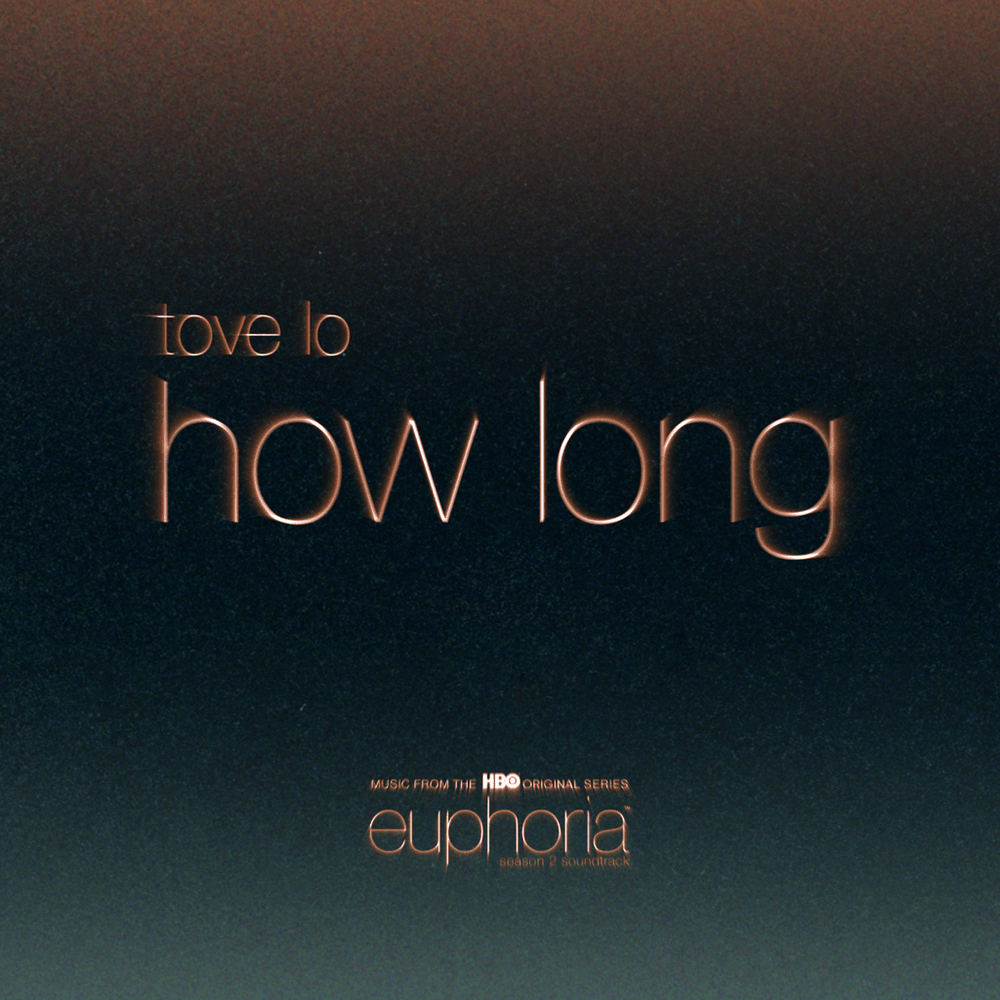

Single by Tove Lo

from the album Dirt Femme and Euphoria Season 2 (An HBO Original Series Soundtrack)
- Released: 26 January 2022
- Recorded: Late 2021
- Genre: Electro-pop
- Length: 3:18
- Label: Interscope Records
- Songwriters: Ebba Tove Elsa Nilsson; Tim Nelson; Sibel Redžep; Ludvig Söderberg
- Producers: A Strut; TimFromTheHouse

Tove Lo singles chronology
"Venus Fly Trap" (Kito remix) (2021)	"How Long" (2022)	"No One Dies from Love" (2022)

Music video
- "How Long" on YouTube

"How Long" is a song by Swedish singer-songwriter Tove Lo, released by Interscope Records on 26 January 2022 as the lead single from her fifth studio album Dirt Femme. The track was written by Lo, alongside producer Tim Nelson, Sibel Redžep, and Ludvig Söderberg. The record features prominently in "You Who Cannot See, Think of Those Who Can", the fourth episode of the second season of the American teen drama series Euphoria. It is the second single to Euphoria Season 2 (An HBO Original Series Soundtrack), released on 4 March.

== Background ==
Swedish singer-songwriter Tove Lo recorded "How Long" during the COVID-19 lockdowns. Interscope Records released the song on 26 January 2022 as the lead single to her fifth studio album Dirt Femme, and second single of compilation album Euphoria Season 2 (An HBO Original Series Soundtrack). Four days later, the song appeared in the "You Who Cannot See, Think of Those Who Can", the fourth episode of the second season of the American teen drama series Euphoria, the soundtrack of which was released on 4 March.

== Composition ==
An electropop song, "How Long" opens with a "propulsive nu-disco beat" and "glitchy sounds of synths", beginning at a slow tempo before gradually accelerating. It addresses the "agony" of a "one-sided affairs", according to Nylon's Steffanne Wang. As the track settles into its rhythm, minimal drums enter alongside Lo's vocals. The "dark but chill sound" of synths and sparse percussion build tension toward a larger, melodic chorus, in which she asks, "how long have you loved another, while I'm dreaming of us together?" Lo told Spin that the song "is about love, betrayal and denial. It was one of the few songs that came together for me during quarantine, and I think it's so beautiful in all its darkness. I'm so honored that it gets to be a part of Euphoria, a show I love so much because of its rawness and provocative storytelling."

== Commercial performance ==
Lo revealed the music video of "How Long" on 10 February 2022, directed by Jonathan Salmon and Abdi Ibrahim, known by the moniker Kenten. Emily Zemler of Rolling Stone observed that the video "features the singer in a shimmering gold dress and boots — capturing the essence of vintage Hollywood glamour — while she moves robotically as tears stream down her face."

== Critical response ==
MTV described "How Long" as "ecstasy to the ears".

== Charts ==
=== Weekly charts ===
Weekly chart performance
Chart (2022–2025)	Peak position
Belarus Airplay (TopHit)	39
Bulgaria Airplay (PROPHON)	1
CIS Airplay (TopHit)	1
Czech Republic Airplay (ČNS IFPI)	23
Finland Airplay (Radiosoittolista)	16
Kazakhstan Airplay (TopHit)	23
Poland Airplay (ZPAV)	3
Russia Airplay (TopHit)	1
Sweden (Sverigetopplistan)	92
Ukraine Airplay (TopHit)	1

=== Monthly charts ===
Monthly chart performance
Chart (2022–2023)	Peak position
Belarus Airplay (TopHit)	69
CIS Airplay (TopHit)	1
Czech Republic (Rádio – Top 100)	26
Kazakhstan Airplay (TopHit)	28
Russia Airplay (TopHit)	2
Ukraine Airplay (TopHit)	3

=== Year-end charts ===
Annual chart rankings
Chart (2022)	Position
CIS Airplay (TopHit)	10
Poland (ZPAV)	17
Russia Airplay (TopHit)	6
Ukraine Airplay (TopHit)	4
Chart (2023)	Position
Belarus Airplay (TopHit)	56
CIS Airplay (TopHit)	71
Kazakhstan Airplay (TopHit)	30
Russia Airplay (TopHit)	94
Ukraine Airplay (TopHit)	37
Chart (2024)	Position
Belarus Airplay (TopHit)	77
CIS Airplay (TopHit)	184
Chart (2025)	Position
Belarus Airplay (TopHit)	116

== Certifications ==
Certifications and sales
Region	Certification	Certified units/sales
Poland (ZPAV)	Platinum	50,000^{‡}
^{‡} Sales+streaming figures based on certification alone.

== Release history ==
Release history
Region	Date	Format	Label	Ref.
Various	26 January 2022	Digital download; streaming	Interscope	
