= Dirt Femme =

Studio album by Tove Lo
- Released: 14 October 2022
- Genre: Dance-pop
- Length: 39:40
- Label: Pretty Swede
- Producers: Elvira Anderfjärd; SG Lewis; OzGo; Totally Enormous Extinct Dinosaurs; Ali Payami; A Strut; TimFromTheHouse

Tove Lo chronology
Sunshine Kitty (2019)	Dirt Femme (2022)	Heat (2024)

Singles from Dirt Femme
- 1. "How Long" Released: 26 January 2022; 2. "No One Dies from Love" Released: 4 May 2022; 3. "2 Die 4" Released: 27 July 2022; 4. "Grapefruit" Released: 12 October 2022

Singles from Dirt Femme (Extended)
- 1. "Borderline" Released: 10 February 2023; 2. "I Like U" Released: 31 May 2023; 3. "Elevator Eyes" Released: 9 August 2023

Dirt Femme is the fifth studio album by Swedish singer Tove Lo. It was her first to be independently released by her own label, Pretty Swede Records (under Mtheory), on 14 October 2022. The first two singles, "How Long" and "No One Dies from Love", had been released earlier that year. The first was featured on the soundtrack to the second season of the American TV series Euphoria. She collaborates with artists First Aid Kit, SG Lewis, and Channel Tres. An "extended cut" edition was released on 11 August 2023, promoted by the singles "Borderline", "I Like U", and "Elevator Eyes".

== Background ==
Tove Lo released her fourth studio album, Sunshine Kitty, in September 2019. It received positive reviews from contemporary music critics and had a moderate commercial performance. In May of the following year, after touring across Europe and North and South America, the singer reissued the album with the subtitle Paw Prints Edition, including four additional songs and four remixes. Two years after Sunshine Kitty, Lo started teasing via social media the release of a fifth album; by September 2021, the record was "taking shape". Earlier that year, in April, fellow singer Charli XCX revealed she worked with Lo in "making the best music ever" in Palm Springs, California. The two previously collaborated on "Out of My Head", from XCX's 2017 mixtape Pop 2, and on the 2018 remix of "Bitches", from Lo's 2017 album Blue Lips.

In May 2022, Lo announced Pretty Swede Records, her own record label under artist development company Mtheory. Being independently released, Dirt Femme marks the first time Lo had complete creative control over an album's development process. Although she recognizes the importance of her former contract with the Universal Music Group, which was "crucial" for her to breakthrough worldwide, Lo "like[s] to make these intricate stories that don't help the algorithm and maybe aren't the most commercial way to do pop releases and how you put out pop music". The album's making was compared by the singer to a "emotional bungee jump" because its development process was the first since her debut, Queen of the Clouds, to not happen in between touring. "This almost felt like I was back to starting completely new again", she accounted.

== Promotion ==
Lo's first solo effort in almost two years and Dirt Femme's lead single, "How Long" was released on 26 January 2022 as part of the soundtrack from American television series Euphoria. The song was also featured on the fourth episode of the series' second season, "You Who Cannot See, Think of Those Who Can". An accompanying music video directed by Seattle filmmaking duo Kenten premiered on 10 February. Alongside the announcement of Pretty Swede Records' founding on 3 May 2022, Lo issued "No One Dies from Love" as the album's following single and the first material released under the newly founded imprint. The song's music video premiered the same day and was directed by Brazilian duo Alaska Filmes, with whom Lo previously worked with on "Are U Gonna Tell Her?". That day, the singer also announced a concert tour, scheduled to start on 29 October and visit Europe and the United Kingdom. On 21 June 2022, Lo officially revealed the album's title to be Dirt Femme, as well as its track listing, artwork and release date of 14 October 2022. The same day, she released the promotional single, "True Romance". The third single, "2 Die 4", was released on 27 July.

On 5 May 2023, a seven-track acoustic EP was released called Dirt Femme (Stripped).

== Artwork ==
In the album's artwork, Lo wears a metallic, robotic scorpion stinger—a reference to her astrological sign, Scorpio—attached to her back while her vagina-inspired logo lies on the side of her hip. According to the singer, her use of scorpion-related imagery reflects the album's approach of femininity: "I just love the fact that the female scorpion eats the male scorpion after mating. I'm in a very lovely relationship now where we have a good balance of crazy between us. But I get told that I draw people in and I consume them".

== Composition ==
In a June 2022 interview with Rolling Stone, Lo stated that her fifth album would "be a very beautiful visual and sonical [sic] journey" and that she created a "new world" for it. Describing the record's lyrics as "extremely personal", she highlighted their inquisitive nature: "It's all my feelings, thoughts and questions put together in under 50 minutes with no answers". The result is a body of work encompassed by songs that "will contradict each other, will probably upset some of you, will make you want to dance, cry, fuck, and drive your car really, really, fast". The album's inspiration came from a moment of introspection during the COVID-19 pandemic as she reflected upon her 10-year career, her femininity and her pansexuality in the midst of her marriage to Charlie Twaddle. She stated: "I'm bringing up all these questions and feelings and emotions that don't necessarily have answers to them. It's just more my current place of wonder". Lo further explained:

"When I started out as a writer and an artist, I used to view my feminine traits as weaker and would enhance my masculine traits to get ahead in life. I feel a big energy shift in my environment since then and this album reflects the various ways my feminine side has both helped and hurt me. I'm a pansexual woman married to a straight man. I believe masculine and feminine lives on a spectrum in all humans. There are so many more interesting nuances than most people want to accept."

Lyrics of "Suburbia" address "never wanting marriage, not wanting children, and not feeling like that's a life that I want" and were inspired by the fact that some people get offended by Lo's indifference towards having children of her own. "2 Die 4" samples Swedish character Crazy Frog's 2005 cover of Gershon Kingsley's 1969 song "Popcorn"; it was described as a "nostalgic wet dream" by Rolling Stone's writer Tomás Mier. Lo stated that "True Romance" was recorded in a single take and was "really fun" to make due to its more "dramatic" and narrative tone in comparison to most of her works. Inspired by Tony Scott's 1993 film of the same name, "True Romance" is a love song that uses the film's plot to introduce a new story, "one of the most destructive, beautiful, overdramatic spins-out-of-control love stories". Since its lyrics are "very dirty" and play "over a really sexy beat", Lo described "Pineapple Slice" as a mix of "Disco Tits" and "Bitches", both included of her 2017 album Blue Lips.

== Critical reception ==
Professional ratings
Aggregate scores
Source	Rating
AnyDecentMusic?	7.4/10
Metacritic	77/100
Review scores
Source	Rating
AllMusic	4/5 stars
DIY	4.5/5 stars
Gigwise	8/10 stars
The Independent	3/5 stars
The Line of Best Fit	9/10
NME	4/5 stars
Pitchfork	5.4/10
Rolling Stone	4/5 stars
The Skinny	3/5 stars
Slant Magazine	3/5 stars

Dirt Femme received positive reviews from contemporary music critics. At Metacritic, which assigns a normalized rating out of 100 to reviews from mainstream critics, the album has an average score of 77 based on 14 reviews, indicating "generally favorable reviews". Aggregator AnyDecentMusic? gave it 7.4 out of 10, based on their assessment of the critical consensus.

AllMusic's Heather Phares praised the album's musical direction, writing, "Lo is maturing but holding onto the most important parts of herself. Dirt Femme gives the confessional, sexual, and danceable sides of her music equal time and offers a fuller portrait of her music than we've heard before". The Line of Best Fit writer Sam Franzini pointed out that "confidence and unadulterated passion for being herself comes together on Dirt Femme, a much darker album than its predecessor Sunshine Kitty, but truer to Nilsson with its pulsating beats and slinky jams" and also described the album as "sexy, smart, and most importantly; fun" Emma Swann of DIY writes that Dirt Femme sees Lo juxtapose elements ingeniously. Gigwise writer Jordan White described the album as "hot-bodied" additionally stating that is "overtly camp and doesn't shy from its playful side". NME's Nick Levine giving it four out of five stars, named the album as "spiky, surprising and not quite cohesive, but never ever boring."

In a mixed review writing for The Skinny, Tara Hepburn identified this album as "pandemic baby" lamented that this project "is a mixed bag as the singer explores new paths for herself". Thomas Bedenbaugh from Slant Magazine criticised the album because of its lack of the sing-along hooks that have made Lo's past efforts, especially 2016's Lady Wood, so memorable, while describing the album as "a collection of slightly melancholic, occasionally catchy dance-floor filler". Pitchfork's Peyton Thomas dubbed the album "the first Tove Lo album you can play for your grandparents", claiming that she lost "a lot of her spark in the process" of pivoting to tamer themes and giving more lethargic performances.

Select year-end rankings of Dirt Femme
Publication	List	Rank	Ref.
Stereogum	The 10 Best Pop Albums Of 2022	4	
PopBuzz	The Best Albums of 2022	20	
Rolling Stone	The 100 Best Albums of 2022	28	
The Line of Best Fit	The Best Albums of 2022 Ranked	39	
The Guardian	The 50 Best Albums of 2022	49	
Albumism	The 100 Best Albums of 2022	100	

== Tour ==
Tove Lo announced first leg of her Dirt Femme Tour on May 3, 2022, which took place in Europe. Tickets went on sale on May 6, 2022. Tove Lo announced her second leg on October 3, 2022, which took place in North America. Tickets went on sale on Oct 7, 2022. Additional tour dates and music festivals appearances were announced later on. On October 29, 2022, Tour began in Dublin and ended on October 14, 2023, in Austin.

Date	City	Country	Venue	Opening Act
Europe
29 October 2022	Dublin	Ireland	3Olympia Theatre	Miya Folick
1 November 2022	Glasgow	Scotland	SWG3	Miya Folick
2 November 2022	Manchester	United Kingdom	Manchester Academy	Miya Folick
3 November 2022	Birmingham	United Kingdom	O_{2} Institute	Miya Folick
5 November 2022	London	United Kingdom	The Roundhouse	Miya Folick
8 November 2022	Brussels	Belgium	La Madeleine	Miya Folick
9 November 2022	Cologne	Germany	Live Music Hall	Miya Folick
10 November 2022	Paris	France	Bataclan	Miya Folick
12 November 2022	Luxembourg	Luxembourg	Den Atelier	Miya Folick
13 November 2022	Amsterdam	Netherlands	Melkweg	Miya Folick
15 November 2022	Berlin	Germany	Astra Berlin	Miya Folick
16 November 2022	Warsaw	Poland	Klub Stodoła	Miya Folick
18 November 2022	Copenhagen	Denmark	Vega	Miya Folick
19 November 2022	Oslo	Norway	Sentrum Scene	Miya Folick
21 November 2022	Stockholm	Sweden	Berns	Miya Folick
22 November 2022	Stockholm	Sweden	Berns	Miya Folick
North America
6 February 2023	Nashville	United States	Ryman Auditorium	Slayyyter
8 February 2023	Richmond	United States	The National	Slayyyter
9 February 2023	Philadelphia	United States	The Fillmore	Slayyyter
10 February 2023	Queens	United States	Knockdown Center	Slayyyter
13 February 2023	Montreal	Canada	MTELUS	Slayyyter
14 February 2023	Toronto	Canada	History	Slayyyter
20 February 2023	Denver	United States	Mission Ballroom	Slayyyter
21 February 2023	Salt Lake City	United States	The Union Event Center	Slayyyter
23 February 2023	Seattle	United States	Paramount Theatre	Slayyyter
25 February 2023	Portland	United States	Roseland Theater	Slayyyter
27 February 2023	Oakland	United States	Fox Oakland Theatre	Slayyyter
2 March 2023	Los Angeles	United States	Wiltern Theatre	Slayyyter
3 March 2023	Los Angeles	United States	Wiltern Theatre	Slayyyter
South America
17 March 2023	Buenos Aires	Argentina	Hipódromo de San Isidro	-
18 March 2023	Santiago	Chile	Parque Bicentenario de Cerrillos	-
20 March 2023	Santiago	Chile	Teatro Teletón	-
22 March 2023	Bogota	Colombia	Royal Center	-
24 March 2023	Briceño	Colombia	Centro de Eventos Briceño 18	-
26 March 2023	São Paulo	Brazil	Autódromo de Interlagos	-
28 March 2023	São Paulo	Brazil	Audio Club	-
Latin America
26 April 2023	Zapopan	Mexico	Guanamor Teatro Studio	-
28 April 2023	Mexico City	Mexico	Auditorio BB	-
29 April 2023	Cuernavaca	Mexico	Jardines de México	-
North America
13 May 2023	Dana Point	United States	Doheny State Beach	-
16 May 2023	Miami Beach	United States	North Beach Bandshell	Slayyyter
17 May 2023	Lake Buena Vista	United States	House Of Blues	Slayyyter
19 May 2023	Gulf Shores	United States	Gulf Shores Public Beach	-
21 May 2023	Austin	United States	Stubb's Bar-B-Q	Slayyyter
22 May 2023	Dallas	United States	South Side Ballroom	Slayyyter
24 May 2023	Phoenix	United States	The Van Buren	Slayyyter
25 May 2023	San Diego	United States	SOMA	Slayyyter
27 May 2023	Napa	United States	Napa Valley Expo	-
29 May 2023	Vancouver	United States	Commodore Ballroom	Slayyyter
Europe
15 June 2023	Oslo	Norway	Sofienbergparken	-
17 June 2023	Landgraaf	Netherlands	Megaland	-
18 June 2023	Cologne	Germany	Live Music Hall	ALMA
19 June 2023	Brussels	Belgium	Ancienne Belgique	ALMA
21 June 2023	Vienna	Austria	Arena	ALMA
22 June 2023	Munich	Germany	Backstage Werk	ALMA
24 June 2023	Prague	Czech Republic	Výstavište	-
26 June 2023	Milan	Italy	Circolo Magnolia	Gaia
28 June 2023	Hamburg	Germany	Fabrik	ALMA
29 June 2023	Roskilde	Denmark	Dyrskuepladsen	-
Australia
19 July 2023	Melbourne	Australia	Forum Theatre	Blusher
21 July 2023	Adelaide	Australia	Adelaide Showground	-
23 July 2023	Byron Bay	Australia	North Byron Parklands	-
25 July 2023	Sydney	Australia	UNSW Roundhouse	Blusher
27 July 2023	Auckland	New Zealand	Auckland Town Hall	Blusher
Europe
10 August 2023	Gothenburg	Sweden	Slottsskogen	-
12 August 2023	Helsinki	Finland	Suvilahti	-
23 August 2023	Saint-Cloud	France	Domaine national de Saint-Cloud	-
24 August 2023	Zurich	Switzerland	Glattbrug	-
North America
5 September 2023	St. Paul	United States	Palace Theatre	Upsahl
6 September 2023	Chicago	United States	The Salt Shed	Upsahl
8 September 2023	Detroit	United States	Royal Oak Music Theatre	Upsahl
10 September 2023	New York	United States	Pier 17	Upsahl
12 September 2023	Boston	United States	Roadrunner	Upsahl
14 September 2023	Washington	United States	The Anthem	Upsahl
15 September 2023	Washington	United States	The Atlantis	Upsahl
17 September 2023	Atlanta	United States	Piedmont Park	-
7 October 2023	Austin	United States	Zilker Park	-
9 October 2023	Los Angeles	United States	The Bellwether	Ladies Of Leisure
10 October 2023	Santa Ana	United States	The Observatory	Ladies Of Leisure
14 October 2023	Austin	United States	Zilker Park	-

== Track listing ==
Dirt Femme track listing
No.	Title	Writer(s)	Producer(s)	Length
1.	"No One Dies from Love"	Tove Nilsson; Ludvig Söderberg	A Strut	3:06
2.	"Suburbia"	Nilsson; Söderberg	A Strut	3:19
3.	"2 Die 4"	Nilsson; Oscar Görres; Gershon Kingsley	Görres	3:04
4.	"True Romance"	Nilsson; Timothy Nelson	Timfromthehouse	4:06
5.	"Grapefruit"	Nilsson; Söderberg; Nelson	A Strut; Timfromthehouse	3:51
6.	"Cute & Cruel" (featuring First Aid Kit)	Nilsson; Elvira Anderfjärd	Elvira	3:00
7.	"Call on Me" (with SG Lewis)	Nilsson; Samuel George Lewis; Orlando Higginbottom	SG Lewis; Totally Enormous Extinct Dinosaurs	3:18
8.	"Attention Whore" (featuring Channel Tres)	Nilsson; Söderberg; Jerome Castille; Sheldon Young	A Strut	3:11
9.	"Pineapple Slice" (with SG Lewis)	Nilsson; Lewis	SG Lewis	2:55
10.	"I'm to Blame"	Nilsson; Ali Payami	Payami	3:20
11.	"Kick in the Head"	Nilsson; Nelson	Timfromthehouse	3:12
12.	"How Long"	Nilsson; Sibel Redžep; Söderberg; Nelson	A Strut; Timfromthehouse	3:18
Total length:				39:40

Dirt Femme (Stripped) track listing
No.	Title	Writer(s)	Length
1.	"Borderline" (Stripped in Brazil)	Nilsson; Dua Lipa; Jakob Jerlström; Söderberg	3:13
2.	"Call on Me" (Stripped at SG's) (with SG Lewis)	Nilsson; Lewis; Higginbottom	2:53
3.	"No One Dies from Love" (Stripped in France)	Nilsson; Söderberg	3:42
4.	"Pineapple Slice" (Stripped in Norway)	Nilsson; Lewis	3:11
5.	"Suburbia" (Stripped in UK)	Nilsson; Söderberg	3:16
6.	"Grapefruit" (Stripped at home)	Nilsson; Nelson; Söderberg	3:26
7.	"How Long" (Stripped at home)	Nilsson; Nelson; Söderberg; Redžep	3:14
Total length:			22:56

Dirt Femme (Extended Cut) track listing
No.	Title	Writer(s)	Producer(s)	Length
1.	"Elevator Eyes"	Nilsson; Joel Little	Little	2:58
2.	"I Like U"	Nilsson; Nelson	Timfromthehouse	3:11
3.	"Borderline"	Nilsson; Lipa; Jerlström; Söderberg	The Struts for Wolf Cousins Productions	3:42
4.	"No One Dies from Love"	Nilsson; Söderberg	A Strut	3:06
5.	"Suburbia"	Nilsson; Söderberg	A Strut	3:19
6.	"2 Die 4"	Nilsson; Görres; Kingsley	Görres	3:04
7.	"True Romance"	Nilsson; Nelson	Timfromthehouse	4:06
8.	"Grapefruit"	Nilsson; Söderberg; Nelson	A Strut; Timfromthehouse	3:51
9.	"Cute & Cruel" (featuring First Aid Kit)	Nilsson; Anderfjärd	Elvira	3:00
10.	"Call on Me" (with SG Lewis)	Nilsson; Lewis; Higginbottom	Lewis; Dinosaurs	3:18
11.	"Attention Whore" (featuring Channel Tres)	Nilsson; Söderberg; Castille; Young	A Strut	3:11
12.	"Pineapple Slice" (with SG Lewis)	Nilsson; Lewis	SG Lewis	2:55
13.	"I'm to Blame"	Nilsson; Payami	Payami	3:20
14.	"Kick in the Head"	Nilsson; Nelson	Timfromthehouse	3:12
15.	"How Long"	Nilsson; Redžep; Söderberg; Nelson	A Strut; Timfromthehouse	3:18
16.	"No One Dies from Love" (Extended)	Nilsson; Söderberg	A Strut	3:22
17.	"No One Dies from Love" (Jacques Greene Remix)	Nilsson; Söderberg	A Strut	3:22
18.	"2 Die 4" (Jax Jones Midnight Snacks Remix)	Nilsson; Görres; Kingsley	Görres; Jax Jones	2:35
19.	"I Like U" (Dorian Electra Remix)	Nilsson; Nelson	Timfromthehouse; Dorian Electra	2:35
Total length:				63:01

=== Notes ===
- "2 Die 4" samples "Popcorn", composed by Gershon Kingsley.
- "Call on Me" contains elements of "You Spin Me Round (Like a Record)" by English band Dead or Alive from their second album Youthquake (1985).
- "I Like U" is stylized as "I like u".

== Personnel ==
- Tove Lo – vocals
- Reuben Cohen – mastering engineer
- Chris Gehringer – mastering engineer
- Şerban Ghenea – mixing engineer
- John Hanes – mixing engineer

== Charts ==
Chart (2022)	Peak position
Belgian Albums (Ultratop Flanders)	86
Belgian Albums (Ultratop Wallonia)	167
Finnish Albums (Suomen virallinen lista)	34
Irish Albums (IRMA)	95
Lithuanian Albums (AGATA)	41
Norwegian Albums (VG-lista)	11
Spanish Albums (Promusicae)	59
Swedish Albums (Sverigetopplistan)	11
Swiss Albums (Schweizer Hitparade)	50
UK Album Downloads (Official Charts)	9
UK Independent Albums (Official Charts)	50
US Billboard 200	153
US Independent Albums (Billboard)	24

== Release history ==
Region	Date	Format	Version	Label	Ref.
Various	14 October 2022	CD; LP; digital download; streaming	Standard	Pretty Swede; mtheory	
Various	5 May 2023	digital download; streaming	Stripped	Pretty Swede; mtheory	
Various	11 August 2023	digital download; streaming	Extended Cut	Pretty Swede; mtheory	
