= Pussy Riot discography =

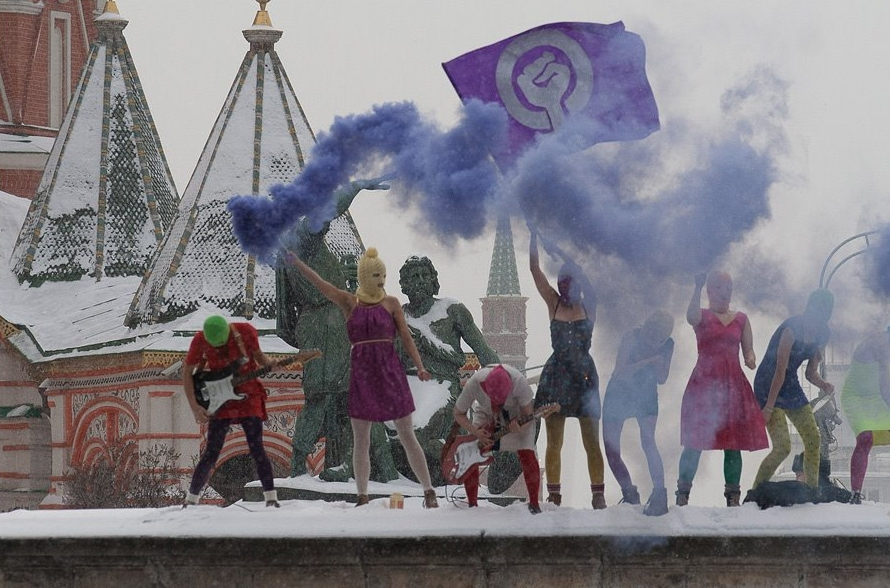
- Pussy Riot performing at Lobnoye Mesto in Red Square, on January 20, 2012
- Studio albums: 1
- EPs: 3
- Singles: 21
- Music videos: 38
- Mixtapes: 1
- Bootleg Releases: 2

Russian feminist protest art group Pussy Riot has released two Bootleg records, one mixtape, three extended plays, numerous singles and music videos. The band, which has an unspecified number of members but most popularly consists of Nadya Tolokonnikova, Maria Alyokhina and Yekaterina Samutsevich, gained international recognition in 2012 when they publicly protested against Vladimir Putin with their song "Punk Prayer: Mother of God Drive Putin Away".

The group's first release, Убей сексиста (trans: "Kill the Sexist"), is a Bootleg recording which came out in 2012 with a limited release. The same songs were unofficially re-released as In Riot We Trust in 2017. In August 2022, Pussy Riot released their the mixtape Matriarchy Now.

The first studio album was announced in June 2026.

== Studio albums ==
List of studio albums, with selected details
Title	Details
CYKA	Release date: June 12, 2026; Label: Self-released; Formats: Digital

== Bootleg Recordings ==
List of unofficial releases
Title	Details
Kill the Sexist! ("Ubey seksista!")	Released: 2012; Unofficial release; Formats: Digital download
In Riot We Trust	Released: 2017 (reissued in 2022); Unofficial release; Formats: Cassette, vinyl

== Mixtapes ==
List of mixtapes, with selected details
Title	Details
Matriarchy Now	Released: August 5, 2022; Label: Neon Gold; Formats: Digital download, streaming

== Extended plays ==
List of extended plays, with selected details
Title	Details
Убей сексиста (trans. "Kill the Sexist")	Released: 2012 (reissued in 2016); Label: Self-released; Formats: CD, cassette, digital download
xxx	Released: October 28, 2016; Label: Big Deal, Nice Life, Federal Prism; Formats: Digital download, streaming
Rage Remixes	Release: December 17, 2021; Label: Self-released; Formats: Digital download, streaming

== Singles ==
=== As lead artist ===
List of singles as lead artist
Year	Title	Album	Ref
2017	"Police State"	Non-album singles	
2018	"Bad Apples" (featuring Dave Sitek)	Non-album singles	
2018	"Bad Girls" (featuring Dave Sitek and Desi Mo)	Non-album singles	
2018	"Track About Good Cop"	Non-album singles	
2019	"Black Snow" (featuring Mara 37)	Non-album singles	
2019	"1937"	Non-album singles	
2019	"Hangerz" (featuring Junglepussy and Vic Mensa)	Non-album singles	
2020	"НОЖ / Knife"	Non-album singles	
2020	"1312" (featuring Dillom, Muerejoven, Parcas)	Non-album singles	
2020	"Riot" (featuring IXXF)	Non-album singles	
2021	"Rage"	Non-album singles	
2021	"Toxic" (featuring Dorian Electra)	Non-album singles	
2021	"Sexist" (featuring Hoffmanita)	Non-album singles	
2021	"Panic Attack"	Non-album singles	
2022	"Punish"	Matriarchy Now	
2022	"Laugh It Off" (featuring Vérité and Latasha)	Non-album single	
2022	"Hatefuck" (featuring Slayyyter)	Matriarchy Now	
2022	"Plastic" (featuring ILoveMakonnen)	Matriarchy Now	
2022	"Plaything" (featuring Rei Ami and Kito)	Non-album singles	
2023	"Putin's Ashes"	Non-album singles	
2023	"Bad Trip" (with MYKKA featuring Nova Twins)	Non-album singles	

=== As featured artist ===
List of singles as featured artist
Year	Title	Album
2018	"My Sex" (Brooke Candy featuring Pussy Riot, MNDR and Mykki Blanco)	Non-album singles
2020	"Such a Dick" (IMKORPO featuring Pussy Riot)	Non-album singles
2020	"ACAB" (Push Push featuring Pussy Riot)	Non-album singles
2020	"Strap On" (Mood Killer featuring Pussy Riot)	Solidify
2020	"My Agenda" (Dorian Electra featuring Village People and Pussy Riot)	My Agenda
2020	"Nightshift" (IXXF featuring Pussy Riot)	IXXF
2021	"Power" (Siiickbrain featuring Pussy Riot)	Non-album singles
2021	"Weather Strike" (Tom Morello featuring Pussy Riot)	Non-album singles
2021	"Purge The Poison" (Marina featuring Pussy Riot)	Non-album singles
2021	"Stop Making Stupid People Famous" (Our Lady Peace featuring Pussy Riot)	Spiritual Machines 2
2021	"mondays!" (WHOKILLEDXIX featuring Pussy Riot)	Non-album single
2022	"Interlocked [Lil Texas Remix]" (Danny L Harle featuring DJ Mayhem, Pussy Riot and Lil Texas)	Harlecore (Remixes)
2022	"Q" (Kai Whiston featuring Pussy Riot)	Quiet as Kept, F.O.G.
2022	"Dance with the Devil!" (Boyfriend featuring Pussy Riot)	Sugar & Spice
2023	"Chastity" (Boys Noize featuring Pussy Riot and Alice Glass)	Non-album singles
2023	"Debilitate" (Palaye Royale featuring Pussy Riot)	Non-album singles
2023	"Why" (Zodivk featuring Pussy Riot)	Non-album singles
2023	"We Love You Moar" (Avenged Sevenfold featuring Pussy Riot)	Non-album singles

== Guest appearances ==
List of guest appearances
Title	Year	Other artist(s)	Album
"Benzin"	2020	Zavet	Velvet Heaven
"Dark Souls" (featuring Pussy Riot and Slimemold)	2020	I61	Angelwave
"Mind Yo Bizness"	2020	Ho99o9	Turf Talk Vol. 1
"Break Stuff"	2022	Pussy Riot	In from the Cold (Soundtrack from the Netflix Series)
"Radium Girls"	2022	Tom Morello, The Bloody Beetroots, The Last Internationale	The Catastrophists EP
“We Love You Moar”	2023	Avenged Sevenfold	We Love You Moar

== Music videos ==
List of music videos
Title	Year	Director(s)
"Free the Cobblestones"	2011	
"Kropotkin-Vodka"	2011	
"Death to Prison, Freedom to Protest"	2011	
"Putin Zassal / Putin Has Pissed Himself"	2012	
"Punk Prayer: Mother of God Drive Putin Away"	2012	
"Как в красной тюрьме / Like a Red Prison"	2013	
"Putin Will Teach You How to Love / Путин научит тебя любить Родину"	2014	
"I Can't Breathe"	2015	Taisiya Krougovykh
"Refugees In"	2015	Ralf Schmerberg
"Chaika"	2016	Nadya Tolokonnikova and Andrey Fenochka
"Straight Outta Vagina"	2016	Phillip R Lopez
"Organs"	2016	-
"Make America Great Again."	2016	Jonas Akerlund
"Police State"	2017	Matt Creed
"Bad Apples"	2018	Matt Creed
"В Ы Б О Р Ы / Elections"	2018	BABOONs
"Track About Good Cop"	2018	-
"КОШМАРЫ / Nightmares"	2018	Elizabeth Mamonova
"Pong!"	2018	QuietMan / Johnnie Semerad
"ЕДИНОРОГ / Unicorn Freedom"	2018	Melanie Clemmons
"Black Snow"	2019	Nadya Tolokonnikova
"1937"	2019	Weston Allen and Nadya Tolokonnikova
"Hangerz"	2019	Ilya Abulkhanov
"НОЖ / Knife"	2020	Santiago Pagnotta
"1312"	2020	Vladimir Storm
"Riot"	2020	Nadya Tolokonnikova
"Rage"	2021	Nadya Tolokonnikova
"Toxic"	2021	Nadya Tolokonnikova
"Sexist"	2021	Nadya Tolokonnikova
"Panic Attack"	2021	Asad J. Malik
"Punish"	2022	Ksti Hu
"Hatefuck"	2022	Danin Jacquay
"Plastic"	2022	Haley Bowman
"Putin's Ashes"	2023	Nadya Tolokonnikova
"GOD SAVE ABORTION"	2023	Nadya Tolokonnikova
"Swan Lake"	2023	Anna Aristarkhova
"DISOBEY"	2026	Taisiya Krugovykh & Vasily Bogatov
"Candy Dopamine"	2026	Nadya Tolokonnikova
