= Mazie (singer) =

American psychedelic musical artist

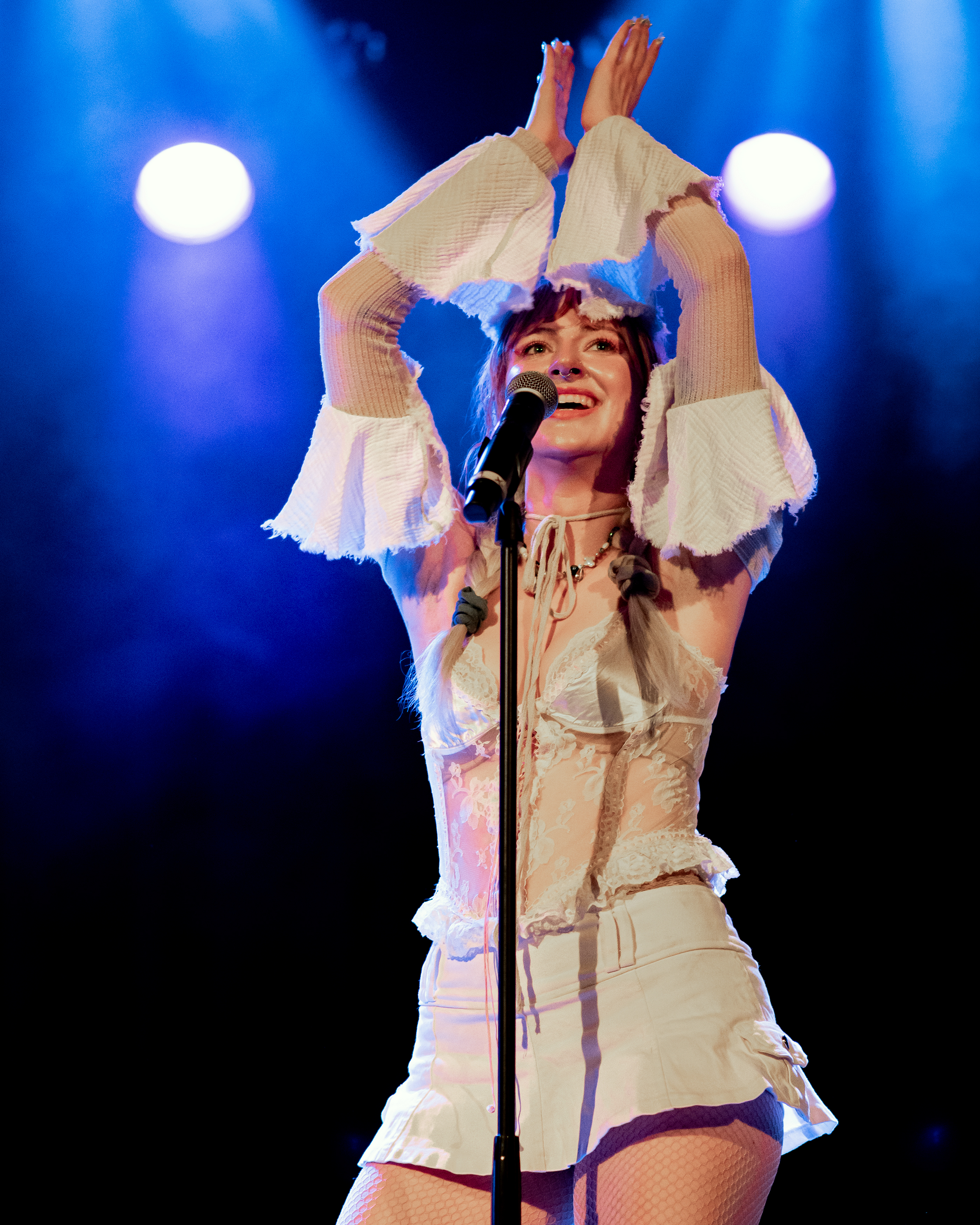
- Mazie (2023)

Background information
- Born: Grace Patricia Christian; 1999 (age 26–27); Albany, Georgia
- Origin: Baltimore, Maryland
- Genres: Pop music, psychedelic music, bedroom pop, alternative pop
- Occupation: Singer
- Instrument: Vocals
- Years active: 2020–present
- Labels: Good Boy; Virgin
- Website: www.heymazie.com

Grace Patricia Christian (born 1999), better known by her stage name Mazie (stylized in all lowercase), is an American pop singer. Starting her career in 2020, she has released several songs. Her most famous is the song "dumb dumb", which had more than 1 million global streams by 2023. Her style has been described as both inspired by psychedelia, as well as bedroom pop.

== Biography ==
=== Early life and education ===
Christian had studied music early on in her life. Born in Albany, Georgia, she had grown up in Baltimore, where she had recorded music with her friend Elie Rizk, who would later go on to help produce most of her music. Her family put her into voice lessons when she was around 9. She went to Drexel University's music Industry program, though she later dropped out after the success of her early songs. In an interview with the zine Unpublished, she said her stage name was inspired by her grandmother Maisie.

=== Career (2020–present) ===
Her debut single, "no friends", was released in 2020. She credits the song's success, fueled by it appearing on an official Spotify playlist, as what made her decide to start singing full time and drop out of college.

In 2021, Mazie moved to Los Angeles and released her first extended play, the Rainbow Cassette. Two of the songs were released as singles, "dumb dumb" and a re-recording of "no friends". Her song "dumb dumb", inspired by misinformation and written a day after the January 6 riots, was later be featured in the Netflix film Do Revenge, and an Uber Eats advertisement airing on the 2024 Super Bowl. The magazine Variety put its inclusion in Do Revenge as one of the best "needle drops" of the year. She also toured with the band Coin during their "Rainbow Dreamland" tour during the fall of that year.

In 2022, Mazie released the song and music video "girls just wanna have sex". That song was listed as one of Out Magazine's top sapphic songs of the year.

Mazie was featured on the 2021 Chloe Moriondo song "not okay" She was also featured on the Pussy riot song "Sugarmommy" from the 2022 mixtape Matriarchy Now. In January 2023, she released a song with Steve Aoki and Regard called "New York".

In February 2023, Mazie released her first full-length album, blotter baby. It contained songs from her previous EPs and singles, such as "girls just wanna have sex" and "dumb, dumb". On the same day, a music video for the song "are you feeling it now" debuted. In the same year, she also sang in the British Summer Time concert on July 2, supporting the K-pop group Blackpink.

== Musical style ==
Mazie's style is inspired by psychedelia. She cites The Beatles as a major influence, as well as her experiences with psychedelic drugs in college. She also cites modern psychedelic bands like Crumb (band), Tame Impala, and King Gizzard and the Lizard Wizard as influences.

Mazie has been known to use political events as inspiration for lyrics. She used the January 6th insurrection and other examples of misinformation, like QAnon, as inspiration for "dumb dumb", and used the overturning of Roe vs Wade as inspiration for "girls just wanna have sex.

== Personal life ==
Mazie is queer. She is involved in political activism, and sees Alexandria Ocasio-Cortez as one of her biggest non-musical influences.

== Discography ==
Albums

Title	Album details
blotter baby	Released February 24, 2023; Label: Goodboy records; Format: CD, streaming, digital

Extended plays

Title	Album details
the rainbow cassette	Released August 25, 2021; Label: Goodboy records
girls just wanna have sex	Released November 18, 2022
