= No One Dies from Love =

Single by Tove Lo

from the album Dirt Femme
- Released: 4 May 2022
- Genre: Synth-pop
- Length: 3:06
- Label: Pretty Swede; Mtheory
- Songwriters: Tove Lo; Ludvig Söderberg
- Producer: A Strut

Tove Lo singles chronology
"How Long" (2022)	"No One Dies from Love" (2022)	"2 Die 4" (2022)

Music video
- "No One Dies from Love" on YouTube

"No One Dies from Love" is a song by Swedish singer-songwriter Tove Lo, released on 4 May 2022 as the second single from her fifth studio album Dirt Femme. It is the first release by Lo's record label Pretty Swede Records, an imprint of Mtheory.

== Background and release ==
Lo co-wrote this song with Ludvig Söderberg, who is also known as A Strut. The song was produced by Söderberg. The music video was released on the same day and directed by Brazilian filmmaking team Alaska Filmes.

== Track listing ==
No One Dies from Love – Single

1. "No One Dies from Love" – 3:06

No One Dies from Love (220 Kid remix) – Single

1. "No One Dies from Love" (220 Kid remix) – 3:06

No One Dies from Love (The Remixes) – EP

1. "No One Dies from Love" (Jacques Greene remix) – 5:22
2. "No One Dies from Love" (DJ_Dave Edit) – 3:52
3. "No One Dies from Love" (220 Kid remix) – 3:06

== Charts ==
Chart performance for "No One Dies from Love"
Chart (2022)	Peak position
New Zealand Hot Singles (RMNZ)	36
Norway (VG-lista)	36
Sweden (Sverigetopplistan)	26

== Release history ==
Release history for "No One Dies from Love"
Region	Date	Format	Version	Label	Ref.
Various	3 May 2022	Digital download; streaming	Original	Pretty Swede; mtheory	
Various	15 June 2022	Digital download; streaming	220 Kid remix	Pretty Swede; mtheory	
