= Transviolet =

American alternative pop-rock band

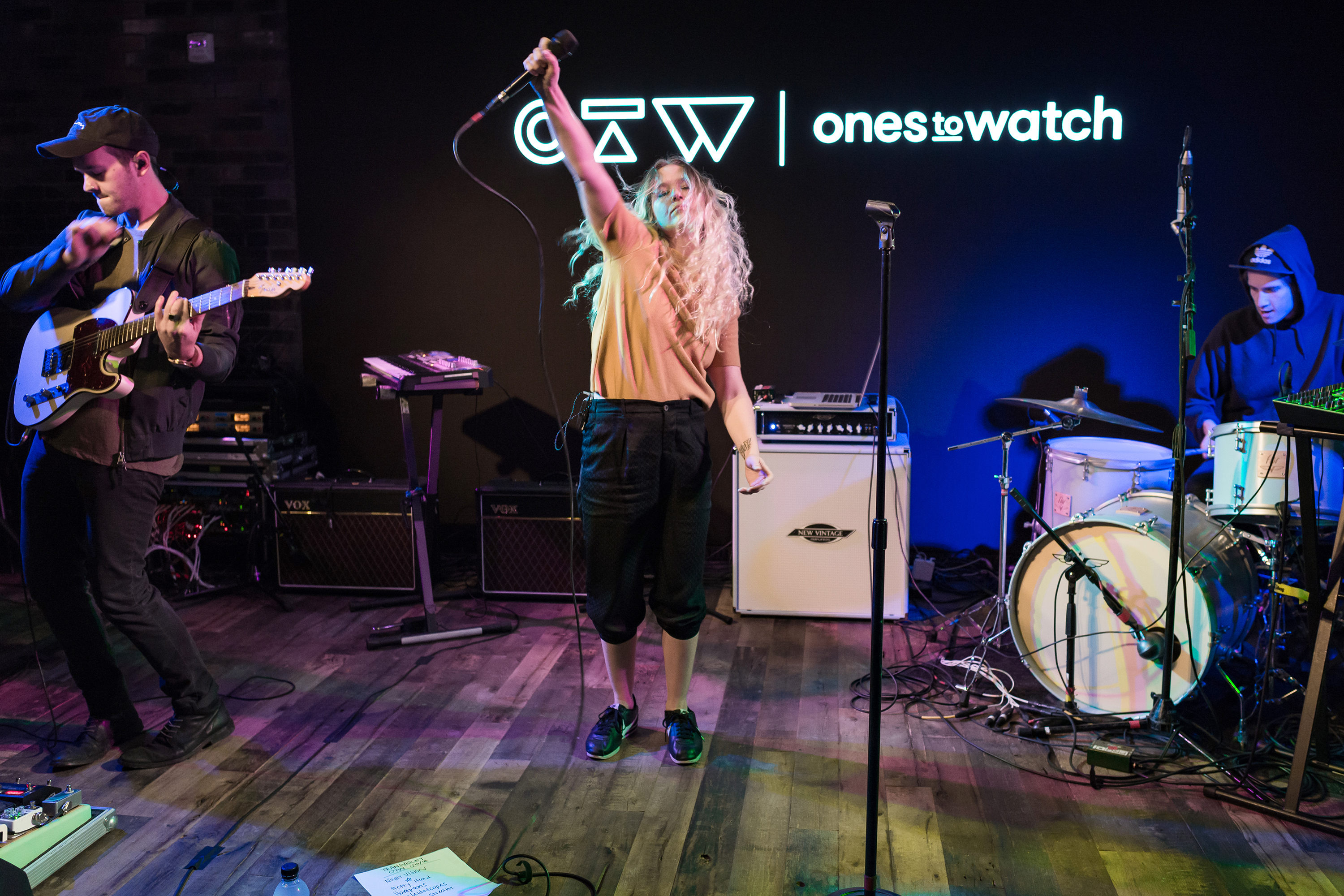

Background information
- Origin: San Diego, California
- Genres: Alternative rock, electropop, dance-pop, indie rock, synth-pop
- Years active: 2015–present
- Labels: Epic, Sony BMG
- Members: Sarah McTaggart; Judah McCarthy; Michael Panek; Jon Garcia
- Website: www.transviolet.com

Transviolet is an alternative pop-rock band formed in the United States in 2015, consisting of lead vocalist Sarah McTaggart, with Judah McCarthy, Michael Panek, and Jon Garcia as musicians and writers. The band initially formed online before moving to the West Coast to collaborate in person. Transviolet gained initial recognition after a local publicity stunt, celebrity endorsements, and after being selected for a Google Play commercial. They have released four albums, three EPs and three singles, and have played a number of high-profile tours and festivals.

== Career ==
McTaggart originally met Panek on a musicians' networking website. At the time, McTaggart lived in Grand Cayman and Panek lived in San Diego, although as McTaggart later recalled, she initially lied on the site and stated she too was from San Diego because that was where she wanted but could not afford to move to. Panek in turn enlisted Garcia, whom he had known since they attended Churchville-Chili Senior High School together. The group, originally named Noise Floor, collaborated at a distance at first before establishing itself in San Diego. After relocating to Los Angeles, McCarthy, another Churchville-Chili alumnus and friend of Panek's and Garcia's, joined the line-up and the name was changed to Transviolet. According to the group, the name was inspired by the poem When The Violets Roar At The Sun by Charles Bukowski, and was chosen to mean "transcendence into a new, violet awareness".

Transviolet firstly began gaining widespread recognition with endorsements from Harry Styles and Katy Perry. McTaggart and Perry had known one another as children and attended the same church.

The band caused some controversy early in its career by sending out anonymous packages containing a cassette tape with "just press play" handwritten on each one. The packages were sent to members of the street team of Fueled by Ramen, a label distributed by Elektra Records. The cassettes contained a recording of the song Girls Your Age, which was released online in mid 2015. A Shazam code was also included. The eponymous EP containing Girls Your Age garnered more than 20 million streams for its top three songs. The band toured with LANY in 2016. The song New Bohemia from the Transviolet EP was chosen for use on a Google Play commercial, and the band was named the "band of the week" by The Guardian in January 2016. That April, New Bohemia entered Billboard's Alternative Songs chart where it peaked at #35. In 2017, the EP Kaleidoscopes was released.

Transviolet was signed by Epic Records in early 2015. They split ways with the label in late 2017. They were then picked up by Sony BMG, followed by the release of the EP Valley in 2018. A track from Valley, Undo, featured as the closing music of an episode of the Netflix series Unbelievable.

The group performed on The Late Late Show with James Corden on July 12, 2016. Transviolet also performed on the Today Show and The Late Show with Stephen Colbert. They have played at a number of festivals, including Reading, Governors Ball, South by Southwest, and Firefly. In July 2018, the band headlined a hometown concert at The Echo (venue), Los Angeles. In September 2019, they self-released the single Sunshine, followed by Money Money in October and Born To Rule in November. Later in November, in advance of a date at the legendary Troubadour (West Hollywood, California), the band guested on Aliens by The Griswolds.

== Members ==
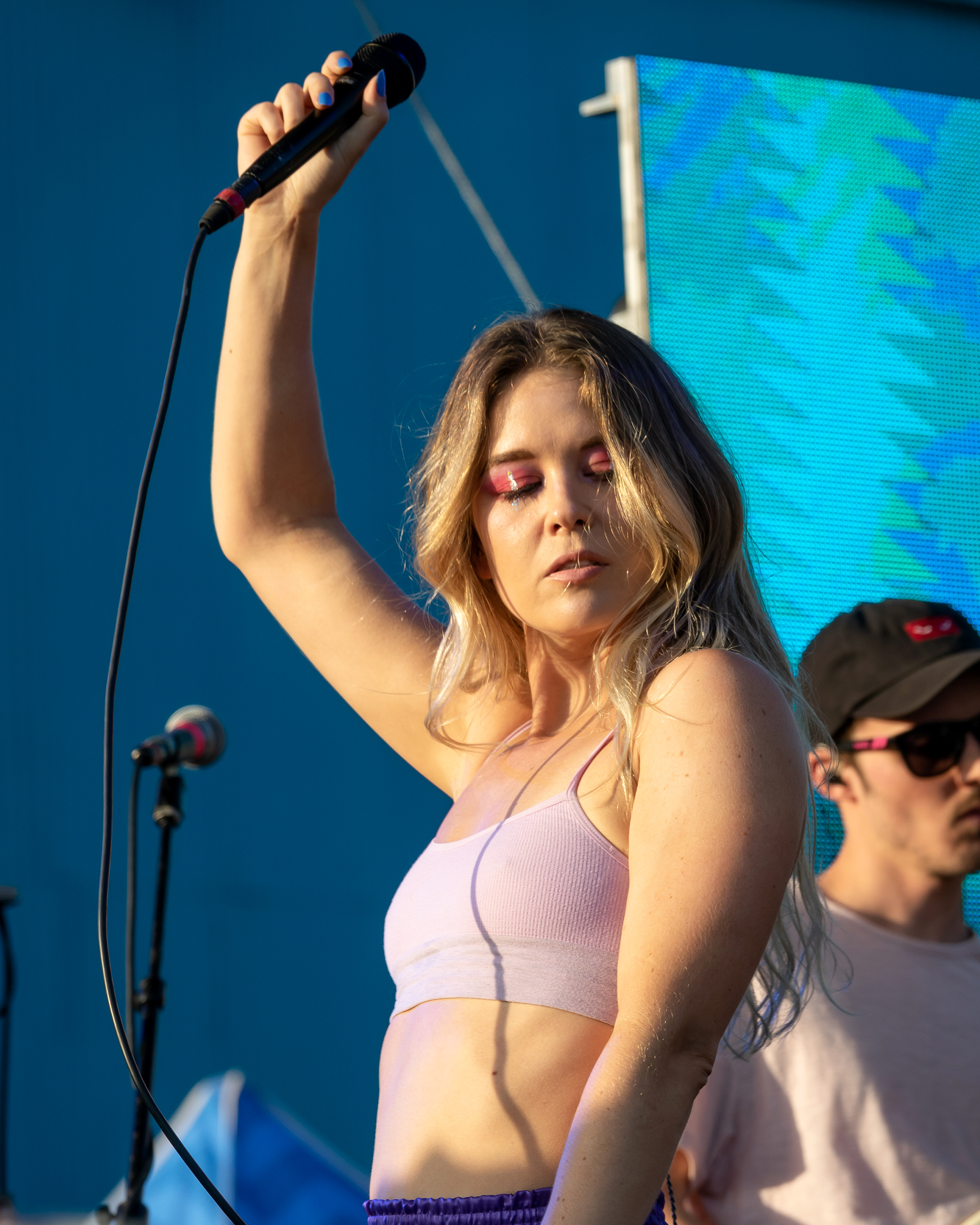
McTaggart performing with Transviolet at the Made In LA festival in 2018

- Sarah McTaggart — vocalist
- Judah McCarthy — guitarist
- Michael Panek — multi-instrumentalist
- Jon Garcia — drummer/producer

== Albums ==
- Born to Rule (2020)
- Drugs in California (2022)
- Body (2023)
- Softcore (2025)

== Extended plays ==
- Transviolet (2015)
- Kaleidoscopes (2017)
- Valley (2018)

== Singles ==
=== As lead artists ===
- "New Bohemia" (2015)
- "LA Love" (2016)
- "Future" (2016)
- "Sunshine" (2019)
- "Money Money" (2019)
- "Born to Rule" (2019)
- "Freak Like Me"(2020)
- "Tropics" (featuring Reo Cragun) (2020)
- "Drugs in California" (2021)
- "Clean Laundry" (featuring Dreamers) (2021)
- "Blue Flowers" (featuring Little Hurt) (2021)
- "Secret" (2024)

=== As featured artists ===
- "Telescope" (with Tim Legend) (2017)
- "Know U" (with Jesse Porsches) (2018)
- "Lost Frequency" (with The Swoons) (2019)
- "Gone" (with Great Good Fine Ok) (2019)
- "Aliens" (with The Griswolds) (2019)
- "Heart Lies" (with Taao Kross) (2020)
- "Tendencies" (with Sleeping Lion) (2020)
- "Daydream" (with Charlie Crown) (2020)
- "Pure Happiness" (with Karma Fields) (2023)

== See also ==
- List of alternative rock artists
- List of bands from Los Angeles
- List of indie rock musicians
