= North Beach Bandshell =

Performance venue in Miami Beach, Florida

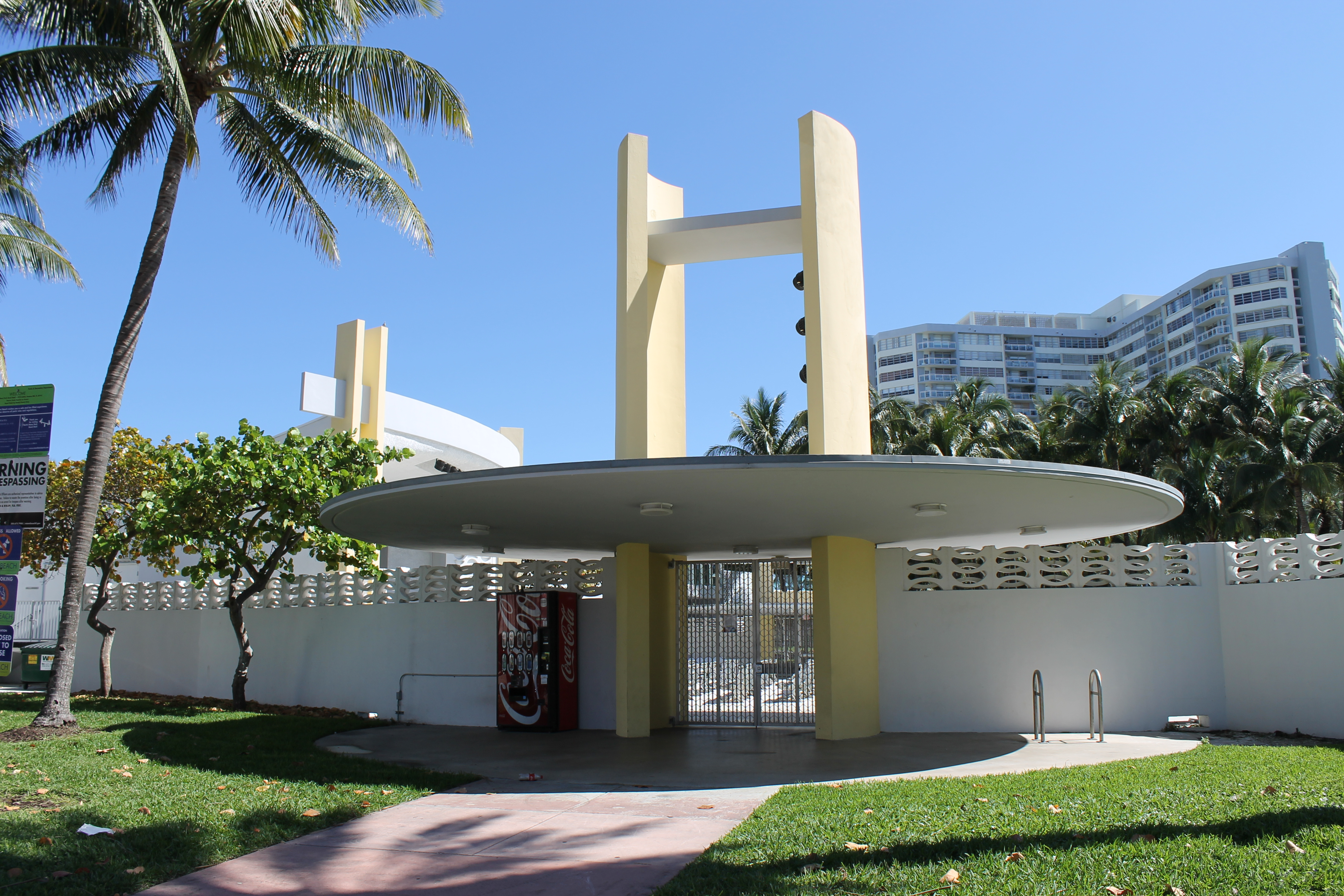
Miami Beach Bandshell

The Miami Beach Bandshell, initially known as the North Shore Community Center, is a historic venue located in Miami Beach, Florida. It is renowned for its architectural significance and its role in Miami Beach's entertainment history.

Designed by prominent architect Norman Giller in 1961, the Bandshell stands out with its geometric interpretation of Miami Modern architecture. Giller, a leading figure in the MiMo style, also has several of his works featured on the National Register of Historic Places.

From its inception, the venue gained national attention, notably serving as the winter home for “The Mike Douglas Show” during the 1970s. This association attracted prominent personalities, including Jackie Gleason, Burt Reynolds, Milton Berle, K.C. and the Sunshine Band, and Bobby Goldsboro, among others.

The venue underwent several transformations over the decades. In the 1960s and 1970s, apart from the televised events, it hosted ballroom dance nights popular among local seniors. By the 1980s and 1990s, the Bandshell had evolved into a rental facility for various promoters.

In 2015, the Miami-based Rhythm Foundation assumed the management of the Bandshell from the city. Since then, programming has flourished, featuring over 100 events annually, including concerts, movies, dances, and various special events.

The Bandshell is the last surviving structure of its kind in Miami Beach, with three other similar structures having existed in the post-World War II era. Recognizing its historical and architectural value, the Bandshell was added to the National Register of Historic Places in 2022. The City of Miami Beach highlighted the Bandshell's importance in a press release, emphasizing its role in entertainment and cultural programming for future generations.

After an extensive renovation by the city, the Bandshell is now poised to cater to the next generation of Miami Beach residents and visitors.

== Location ==
7275 Collins Ave, Miami Beach, FL 33141.

== See also ==
- National Register of Historic Places listings in Miami-Dade County, Florida
