= Tim Nelson (American musician) =

American musician and record producer

- Also known as: Karma Fields; TimFromTheHouse; Betatraxx; Redlight
- Born: Timothy Lawrence Nelson; Santa Barbara, California, United States
- Genres: Electronic; pop; dance; house; experimental; electro house
- Occupations: Musician; record producer; DJ
- Instruments: Piano; digital audio workstation
- Years active: 2009–present
- Labels: dh2; Metamimetic; Big Beat Records; Pilot.; Psi Sci; Ditto Music; Honua Music; 4XLA; FFRR Records; Universal; Atlantic; Sweat It Out
- Member of: Associanu
- Website: karmafields.com

Timothy Lawrence Nelson, known professionally as Karma Fields and TimFromTheHouse, is an American musician, DJ, and record producer from Santa Barbara, California, currently based in Los Angeles.

Having started off producing music as Betatraxx, Nelson signed to Monstercat in 2015 as Karma Fields and released his debut album, New Age | Dark Age, (Note: Originally released via Monstercat, the label released this back to the artist in December 2023, who later published it to Ditto Music.) one year later. His second album, BODY RUSH, was self-released in 2019.

Nelson is also a member of electronic supergroup Associanu.

== Origins ==
Nelson began uploading remixes of popular songs to YouTube in 2009, under the name TheRedlightRemixes. His first upload was a remix of Beyoncé's Control.

== 2010-2014: Betatraxx ==
Having started uploading music to his YouTube channel, Nelson began using the name "Redlight a.k.a. Betatraxx", before eventually deciding to exclusively use Betatraxx (occasionally stylized as BetaTraxx or BetatraXx) as his name in 2010.

Nelson uploaded his first original track as Betatraxx, LA Bass, on March 21, 2010. On July 8 of the same year, his self-titled first EP was released. His second EP, Drug Abuse/Mafiosa EP, was released on January 30, 2011. Shortly after, Nelson released The X EP on February 15.

Nearly a year later on February 27, 2012, Nelson returned with the single Shuffling and Looking Dumb, with vocals from Krystal. On May 1, Nelson released his remix of fun. & Janelle Monáe's We Are Young, his first official remix as Betatraxx. Two weeks later, his remix of Christina Perri's Arms was released, his second official remix. On September 25, Nelson released the Mercury EP. Nelson's final release of 2012 was a remix of The Joy Formidable's Cholla.

On June 5, 2013, Nelson released a remix of Wiz Khalifa's No Sleep. On August 8, Nelson's collaboration with Welsh singer MARINA (then known as Marina and the Diamonds), Electra Heart, was uploaded onto Diamandis' channel. Nearly a month later, Nelson released the "V" EP on September 3.

On May 5, 2014, a more fleshed-out version of Electra Heart was released. On May 14, Nelson uploaded a remixed version of Electra Heart, stating, "This instrumental was the original track that Electra Heart was recorded over. So while it is a 'remix' it actually existed before Electra Heart did. Although it has been totally done up to make this final version." A classical version of the song was released on June 9. Nelson released the Shapes and Sizes EP on September 30. His final release as Betatraxx was a remix of Pr0files' Forgive, released on November 12 of that year.

== 2015-2016: Karma Fields debut, first album, and The HEX ==
On February 3, 2015, Nelson uploaded a teaser video for a new project, Karma Fields, to the project's YouTube channel. The teaser contained visuals by Chinese visual artist and programmer Raven Kwok (郭銳文), as well as a demo of a then-unreleased song from Karma Fields' upcoming debut album.

Later that month, on February 24, during the 47th episode of the Monstercat Podcast, the livestream appeared to be hacked, with a trailer for the music video of Karma Fields' debut song, Build The Cities, featuring Estonian singer Kerli, interrupting the stream. However, this has been omitted in the official reupload of the episode, with only fan reuploads capturing it. On March 2, the music video for Build The Cities was officially released. In an interview with Billboard, Kwok explained, "Every time I run the system, it will produce a different visual outcome due to randomness of the initial parameters, so the music video itself is an organized yet unpredicted outcome."

On April 9, Nelson announced that "reconstructions" of Build The Cities were in the works. Later that month, a series of remixes were released by various artists, including fellow labelmates Tristam, Grabbitz, and Project 46, among others. The full remix compilation, titled Build The Cities (Reconstructions), was released on May 27.

On September 14, the second Karma Fields single, Skyline, was announced. Three days later, Nelson posted a preview of the "beta" version of Skyline. Skyline was officially released on September 21. Like Build The Cities, Skyline's music video was also created by Kwok. It was widely noted by fans that the beta version and the official version were almost completely different from each other.

The official Karma Fields website was launched on September 28.

To commemorate Build The Cities' music video reaching one million views, stems for the song were released on October 24. The following day, an acoustic version of Skyline was announced, which was released six days later. Many were quick to notice that the acoustic version was the same as the beta version that was previewed before Skyline's official release.

The third Karma Fields single, Stickup, a collaboration between Nelson, Danish producer MORTEN (who Nelson had previously collaborated with while still releasing music as Betatraxx), and American actress and singer Juliette Lewis was announced on November 25. Stickup was released five days later, along with another music video animated by Kwok. The song was notable in its departure from the previous singles, with its sound being much more intense and aggressive. A drum and bass remix by English electronic music act Modestep was released on December 1.

Karma Fields' debut album, New Age | Dark Age, was announced on January 5, 2016. Between January 11 and January 26, the tracklist was gradually revealed, totaling at twelve tracks. The album's fourth and final single, Greatness, a collaboration with American rapper Talib Kweli, was announced on February 2, and officially released alongside yet another video by Kwok on February 17. Nelson announced that the release date for New Age | Dark Age would be March 2, exactly one year after the release of Build The Cities. On April 5, an album-long video was uploaded, which contained all prior music videos, as well as additional visuals, all created by Kwok.

On April 7, Nelson released his first remix as Karma Fields, a rework of Janet Jackson's No Sleeep.

On April 13, UKF released an article on Karma Fields, speculating on who or what Karma Fields was. The article declared that Karma Fields was the "world's first AI artist" and that a machine had been behind all the music (excluding vocalists). The article also included an interview with Kwok, who gave further insight into how the visuals were made, explaining how all of the visuals are coded instead of traditionally animated.

After posting various gifs of visuals throughout July, a trailer for Karma Fields' live debut was uploaded on August 2. On September 7, sheet music was provided for classical versions of Stickup and Build The Cities. The following day, a deluxe version of New Age | Dark Age was announced, alongside the release of the aforementioned classical version of Build The Cities. A competition was announced September 9, where people could submit videos of themselves playing either classical versions of Stickup or Build The Cities. The winner would receive a signed vinyl of New Age | Dark Age, as well as have their entry shared with the Monstercat community. The deluxe version of New Age | Dark Age was released on September 15, containing five classical versions of various songs from the album.

On September 27, a thirteen minute preview of Karma Fields' live show, The HEX, was uploaded to YouTube. The preview shows Nelson performing inside of a hexagonal structure, with synchronized visuals projected onto all six sides. The debut show's date was also announced to be November 10 in Los Angeles. On the same day, Nelson's first official interview as Karma Fields was posted to Billboard's website. Nelson stated that the plan for Karma Fields was to "blur the line between human and computer" and have the project gradually evolve from a computer side to a more human side.

Karma Fields' first material since the deluxe version of New Age | Dark Age was announced on October 25. Between October 28 and November 3, the song Sweat, as well as two remixes by Soulji and Bixel Boys, was released. This would end up being Nelson's last release with Monstercat.

== 2017: Post-Monstercat ==
On April 11, 2017, Nelson announced a second HEX show for April 29, this time at New York City's Webster Hall. Three days later, as a way of promoting the upcoming show, a recording of the live version of Scandal (a collaboration with American actress and singer C.C. Sheffield) from New Age | Dark Age was released.

On June 15, Nelson announced his first song since leaving Monstercat. Shapes, with Australian producer L D R U, was released on July 14.

The third HEX show was scheduled to be in Vancouver on November 24, with Soulji as the opening act.

== 2018-2019: BODY RUSH ==
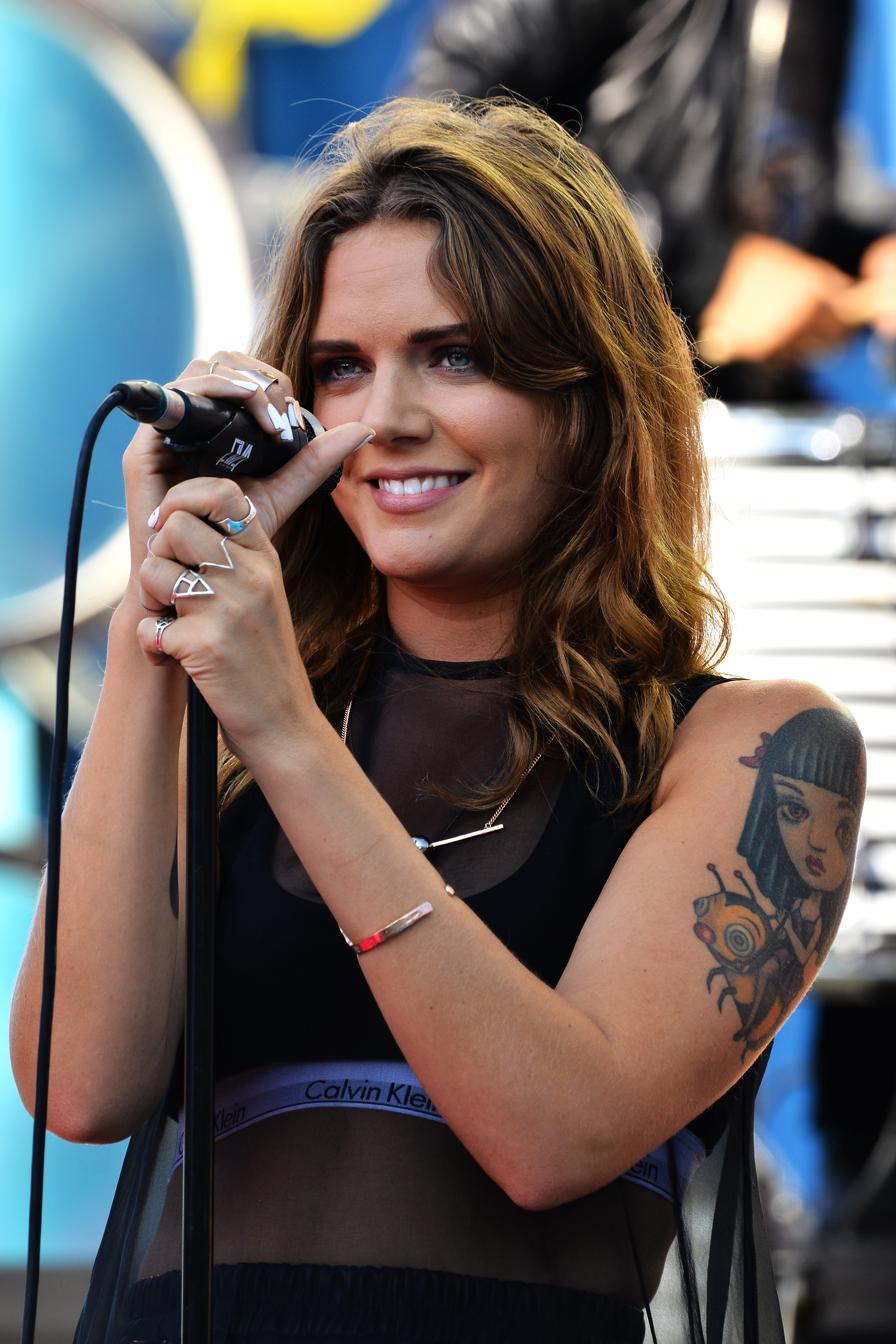
Frequent collaborator Tove Lo in 2014

After 5 months of silence on all social media, Karma Fields reappeared on March 19, 2018. Over the span of a minute, eight tweets were sent out from the Karma Fields twitter account, with all tweets directly mentioning Swedish singer Tove Lo, as well as including a phone number. Calling the number would reveal snippets of an unreleased song, presumed to be a collaboration between the two. One week later, the song, whose title was revealed as Colorblind, was released. Tove Lo stated, "This song is about losing someone you love[...]after a big breakup, the pain in your heart is similar to the pain you feel when someone dies — they’re not in your life anymore. There’s an anger and also a numbness that sets in when you feel left behind, abandoned." The visuals for Colorblind were by Polish artist Patryk Kizny.

On May 8, two remixes of Colorblind by Motez and Left/Right were released.

On May 23, the single Body Rush was announced. It was written in collaboration with Millennial Serial Killer, the solo project of Lauren Pardini of Pr0files, who Nelson had remixed as Betatraxx nearly four years prior. Two days later, Body Rush was released. The video for it included footage sourced from a real world space, multiple references to past Karma Fields music videos, and the inclusion of "DENOUNCE YOUR HUMANITY" written on a wall.

Between July 9 and July 11, Nelson posted one video on each day, teasing another new song. On July 12, the song, titled CODE 10-31, was released, with the title referencing the police code that roughly (police codes vary by county and state) means "crime in progress".

On July 25, Nelson teased a collaboration with English musician Little Boots, whom he had also remixed as Betatraxx. The song (released as part of an EP), You and Me, was released on July 27. The additional song, Midnight Drive, contains uncredited vocals from Pardini. A remix EP with remixes from Soulji and Louis La Roche was released on August 10, with Soulji's being his second remix for Nelson so far.

A small tour of The HEX was announced on August 9. The HEX was to make stops at San Francisco, Los Angeles, and Washington, D.C. on September 15, September 21, and September 28/29 respectively. A remix of Colorblind by OddKidOut was released on August 24. On September 5, Nelson uploaded a video detailing how The HEX was constructed, with a then-unknown song playing in the background.

Nelson revealed on November 15 that he had contributed a Karma Fields remix of WTF Love Is to the deluxe vinyl edition of Tove Lo's Lady Wood, and that it would be exclusive to the vinyl release.

Five days later, another single, An Underground System of Forgotten Machines, was announced. In the accompanying trailer, it was revealed that this was the song playing in the background of the HEX construction video. It was released on November 23.

On February 19, 2019, Nelson uploaded a trailer for the second Karma Fields album, BODY RUSH, with a release date of March 15 being given. The trailer contained real-world footage of social unrest, robots, and numerous clips from news stations such as FOX, CNN, and MSNBC, depicting the rise of the "Body Rush procedure" and the ensuing societal polarization.

A day after the announcement, Nelson uploaded a video in collaboration with Control Forever, where he explains how The HEX works and further elaborates on the meaning behind Karma Fields.

Between February 27 and March 1, links to a (now defunct) site were posted. The site, a recreation of CNN, hosted several articles on the Body Rush procedure and some of its backstory. From March 4 to March 8, the tracklist was revealed in a similar manner to that of New Age | Dark Age, totaling at fourteen songs and including additional collaborators such as Los Angeles singer and producer Shey Baba and Canadian singer Rosette. Pardini's vocals are present on six total songs.

BODY RUSH was released on March 15. A departure from the more electronic and experimental sound of New Age | Dark Age, BODY RUSH embraced a more pop sound, while still retaining heavier elements on select songs.

On April 24, Nelson announced a Karma Fields performance at Overwatch esports team Dallas Fuel's first home game for April 27 and 28.

A Kastle remix of Feel Real was teased on May 6. This would mark Kastle's second remix for Nelson, as he had contributed a remix to Build The Cities (Reconstructions) back in 2015. Nelson's second interview as Karma Fields as posted on May 24, providing insight into the home game performance, as well as detailing the meaning behind BODY RUSH, stating, "The goal of Body Rush was to show how electronic music can be human in nature. The exploration of a computer learning what it is to be human". Nelson also further elaborated that his goal with Karma Fields was to "...find the perfect balance of digital and analogue. The median between digital perfection and human imperfection". Kastle's Feel Real remix was released on July 1.

The deluxe version of BODY RUSH was announced on July 22, with the tracklist revealed a day later, including three live edits, a classical version, and an acoustic version of various songs from the album. It was released three days later on July 26.

That Emotion, a collaboration with Alex Hosking and Nelson's first song post-BODY RUSH, was announced on November 11 and released four days later. It contains a sample from the opening track of BODY RUSH, Ride Through.

== 2020: UPLOADED and edits series ==
On January 9, 2020, Nelson released a Karma Fields edit of French electronic duo Sabrina & Samantha's song Khéops. This would be the first of four edits that Nelson would release throughout the year. Later that month, an official remix for Swedish singer Winona Oak was announced. It was released on January 31.

A new HEX show, UPLOADED, was announced for March 14 at Wisdome LA, an "immersive art park" inside of a dome-shaped room. However, due to concerns over the rise in the spread of COVID-19, the show was indefinitely postponed. As compensation, a 10 minute preview of the show was uploaded to YouTube. Despite the show being postponed, Nelson would continue to preview various visuals and clips of the performance throughout the coming months. As of November 2023, a rescheduled date has not been announced.

On April 2, a second edit was released, this time of American folk band Bon Iver's 715 - CRΣΣKS. Two weeks later, the third entry in the series, an edit of Afro-funk artist Jo Tongo's Piani was released. The fourth, and currently final, edit in the series was released on May 21, being an edit of English musician Romare's All Night.

Several months later, on September 18, a cover of Culture Club's Do You Really Want To Hurt Me was announced, with frequent collaborator Shey Baba on vocals. It was released on September 23.

== 2021: Dreams ==
Nelson and Baba's third collaboration, Dreams, was announced on January 15, 2021, and released four days later. Apple would end up using it in an advertisement for the Apple Watch Series 6.

On February 26, a remix of Dreams by Associanu was released.

On April 21, Nelson released Minari Theme, a nine and a half minute song inspired by the film Minari.

The song its_OK was released on May 19, presumably the first single from Nelson's upcoming untitled third album as Karma Fields. its_OK first appeared in Nelson's UPLOADED preview. The visuals for the song hint at a return towards the more computer-based aspect of Karma Fields, with the artwork containing several lines of code, which one user in the comments of the YouTube upload had discovered to be a part of the Linux kernel. The visuals for its_OK, as well as subsequent singles, were created by French artist Etienne Jacob.

The second single, a sequel to 2018's CODE 10-31, CODE 10-32, was released on June 23. The most likely meaning of the aforementioned code is "person with gun", though as stated before, police codes vary by county and state.

The third single, a collaboration with Swedish singer Amanda Alexander, .me, was released on July 28, with Acid Stag referring to it as "...a true journey through a sonic odyssey with deepened instrumentation slowly bubbling away until we reach a lively climax".

On August 22, a snippet of an unreleased song, Give Me Some, was posted to Karma Fields' TikTok page. The video contains visuals in the style of Kwok, reminiscent of the visual style of New Age | Dark Age. No release date has been given.

The fourth single, KF:KONG, was released on September 10.

On October 16, Nelson's debut mix as Karma Fields was aired on Insomniac Radio. The mix contained multiple unreleased edits, remixes, and singles. A collaboration between Nelson and American singer Reva DeVito was debuted as the last song. The title was revealed to be Timebomb (initially stylized as TimeBomb).

Timebomb was officially released as the album's fifth and presumably final single on November 26. The presumed album was originally slated for a 2021 release, but was pushed back to 2022.

== 2022-2023: It Girl and continued activity ==
Nearly a full year later, Nelson returned as Karma Fields on November 16, 2022 with the announcement of It Girl, a collaboration with Nigerian singer Kah-Lo and supergroup Associanu. It was released on December 2 on Australian dance music label Sweat It Out. Nelson stated, "With 'It Girl' we all wanted to make a song that you can hear anytime and anywhere and it makes you feel confident. It’s really all about confidence for this one, confidence in who you are or who you feel like you are."

A Karma Fields remix of Australian singer and labelmate PRICIE's BIG GIRLS was released on December 16, 2022.

Nelson returned to Insomniac Radio with his second official mix as Karma Fields on December 31, 2022. New edits and remixes were played, including an It Girl remix by American musician Warner Case, as well as an It Girl "refix" by someone that Nelson states that he "[doesn't] know if [he's] allowed to say who made that one yet...or ever".^{45:43 - 45:49}

At the start of 2023, on January 20, 27, and February 3, remixes by Warner Case, Jaded, and Doorly were released, respectively.

A shortened version of Nelson's BIG GIRLS remix was released on February 24.

On June 16, a Karma Fields cover of Me & U by American singer Cassie was released.

On August 11, Me & U (Remixes) was released, with remixes by Harry Hayes, Joel Cantone, Loosie Grind, and Flash.

Two weeks later, on August 25, Get It, a collaboration with Kito and Alida, was released.

On September 7, to mark the 6 year anniversary of frequent collaborator Tove Lo's song Disco Tits, a Karma Fields remix was released, with this being Nelson's second remix for her.

On October 27, after teasing three unreleased songs a week prior, one of them, Pure Happiness, a collaboration with American pop-rock band Transviolet, was released. The remaining two songs, a remix of Torren Foot's Candy, and the "original edit" of Icona Pop's Stick Your Tongue Out (which Nelson had helped write and produce) were both released on December 1. With the latter of the two, Nelson stated, "[...]this was actually the OG version I made for [Icona Pop]. It eventually turned into the final version that first came out in their album, but we always loved the weird simplicity of this one."

On December 7, Nelson announced that the third Karma Fields album would release the following year. No album was released.

== 2024-present: Third album ==
On January 11, 2024, Nelson went live for the first time on the Karma Fields YouTube channel. He went over the project file for a then-upcoming song, a collaboration with Australian duo Kinder, titled Behaviour. He also answered questions from the audience regarding why he decided to show his face (having been a faceless artist as Karma Fields from 2015 to 2022), his time working with Monstercat, how he met Raven Kwok, and more. Nelson also confirmed that the album that was originally scheduled for release in 2021 (which was then pushed to 2022, but never released) and the album scheduled for sometime in 2024 are the same.^{12:53}

Behaviour was released the following day.

== Additional projects ==
=== Associanu ===
On July 18, 2020, Tove Lo previewed an unreleased song in an Animal Crossing DJ set, stating that it was "by a group called Associanu, it's not released yet; you're hearing unreleased stuff right now".^{12:38 - 12:44}

They first officially appeared with a remix of Nelson and Baba's Dreams on February 26, 2021. Associanu's debut song, a slightly edited version of the unreleased song previewed the year prior, titled This Is A Song About Dancing, was released on November 5. Credits revealed that Associanu is a group containing five members:

- Tim Nelson
- Ebba Nilsson
- Charlie Twaddle
- Jesse Selchow
- Samuel Luria

Their second song, Don't Forget To Breathe, was released on June 17, 2022.

Their third song, a collaboration with Nelson (as Karma Fields) and Kah-Lo, titled It Girl, was announced on November 16, and released on December 2. The group stated, "'It Girl' is meant to capture an attitude – fun, sassy, badass, effortless charm – the sensation of walking into a party, feeling good about yourself, like ‘you are IT…girl.’" Roughly around the time of the release of It Girl, extended versions of the previous two singles appeared on streaming services.

According to Nelson, the backstory behind Associanu is "[...]we just wanted to make music and visuals that are fun for us and that we would want to play for friends and hear at the parties we go to."

It Girl was included on Kah-Lo's debut album, Pain/Pleasure, which was released on September 8, 2023.

Their first song of 2024, a collaboration with Torren Foot titled Sleep When I'm Dead, was released on March 7. A remix by LO'99 was released on April 19, followed by a Tony Romera remix on June 7.

On November 22, the song Me Time in Milano was released.

=== TimFromTheHouse ===
Nelson also produces under his real name as TimFromTheHouse (occasionally stylized as Timfromthehouse), having produced for artists such as Tove Lo, Icona Pop, Pussy Riot, and 5 Seconds of Summer.

== Discography ==
=== Albums ===
Artist	Title	Release date	Label
Karma Fields	New Age | Dark Age	March 2, 2016	Ditto Music
Karma Fields	New Age | Dark Age (Deluxe Version)	September 15, 2016	Ditto Music
Karma Fields	BODY RUSH	March 15, 2019	Self Released
Karma Fields	BODY RUSH (DELUXE VERSION)	July 26, 2019	Self Released

=== Compilations ===
Artist	Title	Release date	Label
Karma Fields	Build the Cities (Reconstructions)	May 27, 2015	Ditto Music

=== Extended plays ===
Artist	Title	Release date	Label
Betatraxx	BetaTraxx	July 8, 2010	Self Released
Betatraxx	Drug Abuse/Mafiosa EP	January 30, 2011	Metamimetic
Betatraxx	The X EP	February 15, 2011	Self Released
Betatraxx	Mercury	September 15, 2012	Big Beat Records
Betatraxx	The "V" EP	September 3, 2013	Self Released
Betatraxx	Shapes and Sizes	September 30, 2014	Psi Sci
Karma Fields	Sweat	October 28, 2016	Ditto Music
Karma Fields	Colorblind (Reconstructions)	May 8, 2018	Self Released
Karma Fields	You and Me (Note: Both songs on the You and Me EP are included on BODY RUSH)	July 27, 2018	Self Released
Karma Fields	You and Me (Reconstructions)	August 10, 2018	Self Released
Karma Fields	Me & U (Remixes)	August 11, 2023	Sweat It Out

=== Singles ===
Artist	Title	Album / EP	Release date	Label
BetaTraxx	LA Bass	Non-album single	March 21, 2010	Self Released
Betatraxx	Shuffling and Looking Dumb (with Krystal)	Non-album single	February 27, 2012	DirtyDutchMusic
Betatraxx	Electra Heart (with MARINA)	Non-album single	August 8, 2013 (original) May 5, 2014 (edit)	Pilot.
Betatraxx	Electra Heart (with MARINA) (Classical Version)	Non-album single	June 9, 2014	Psi Sci
Karma Fields	Build The Cities (with Kerli)	New Age | Dark Age	March 2, 2015	Ditto Music
Karma Fields	Skyline	New Age | Dark Age	September 21, 2015	Ditto Music
Karma Fields	Skyline (Acoustic)	Non-album single (Note: Skyline (Acoustic) was later included on New Age | Dark Age (Deluxe Version) as Skyline (Classical), but the album wasn't confirmed at the time of Skyline (Acoustic)'s release)	October 15, 2015	Ditto Music
Karma Fields & MORTEN	Stickup (with Juliette Lewis)	New Age | Dark Age	November 30, 2015	Ditto Music
Karma Fields & MORTEN	Stickup (with Juliette Lewis) (Modestep Remix)	Stickup	December 1, 2015	Ditto Music
Karma Fields	Greatness (with Talib Kweli)	New Age | Dark Age	February 2, 2016	Ditto Music
Karma Fields	Scandal (with C.C. Sheffield) (Live Recording)	Non-album single	April 14, 2017	Self Released
Karma Fields & L D R U	Shapes	Sizzlar	July 14, 2017	Audiopaxx
Karma Fields & L D R U	Shapes (GANZ Remix)	Sizzlar (Remixes)	February 23, 2018	Audiopaxx
Karma Fields	Colorblind (with Tove Lo)	BODY RUSH	March 30, 2018	Self Released
Karma Fields	Body Rush (with Millennial Serial Killer)	BODY RUSH	May 25, 2018	Self Released
Karma Fields	CODE 10-31	Non-album single	July 12, 2018	Self Released
Karma Fields	Colorblind (with Tove Lo) (OddKidOut Remix)	Non-album single	August 24, 2018	Self Released
Karma Fields	An Underground System of Forgotten Machines	BODY RUSH	November 23, 2018	Self Released
Karma Fields	Feel Real (Kastle Remix)	Non-album single	July 1, 2019	Self Released
Karma Fields	That Emotion (with Alex Hosking)	Non-album single	November 15, 2019	Self Released
Karma Fields	Dreams (with Shey Baba)	Non-album single	January 19, 2021	Self Released
Karma Fields	Dreams (with Shey Baba) (Associanu Remix)	Non-album single	February 26, 2021	Self Released / DREAMS
Karma Fields	Minari Theme	Non-album single	April 21, 2021	Self Released
Karma Fields	its_OK (Note: Heavily implied to be included on Nelson's currently unreleased third album)	Non-album single	May 19, 2021	Self Released
Karma Fields	CODE 10-32	Non-album single	June 23, 2021	Self Released
Karma Fields	.me (with Amanda Alexander)	Non-album single	July 28, 2021	Self Released
Karma Fields	KF:KONG	Non-album single	September 10, 2021	Self Released
Associanu	This Is A Song About Dancing	Non-album single	November 5, 2021	FFRR Records
Karma Fields	Timebomb (with Reva DeVito)	Non-album single	November 26, 2021	4XLA / Kitsuné Musique
Associanu	Don't Forget To Breathe	Non-album single	June 17, 2022	FFRR Records
Karma Fields / Associanu	It Girl (with Kah-Lo)	Non-album single	December 2, 2022	Sweat It Out
Karma Fields / Associanu	It Girl (with Kah-Lo) (warner case Remix)	Non-album single	January 20, 2023	Sweat It Out
Karma Fields / Associanu	It Girl (with Kah-Lo) (JADED Remix)	Non-album single	January 27, 2023	Sweat It Out
Karma Fields / Associanu	It Girl (with Kah-Lo) (Doorly Remix)	Non-album single	February 3, 2023	Sweat It Out
Karma Fields, Kito, & Alida	Get It	Non-album single	August 25, 2023	Sweat It Out
Karma Fields & Transviolet	Pure Happiness	Non-album single	October 27, 2023	Sweat It Out
Karma Fields & Kinder	Behaviour	Non-album single	January 12, 2024	Sweat It Out
Torren Foot & Associanu	Sleep When I'm Dead	Non-album single	March 7, 2024	Sweat It Out
Torren Foot & Associanu	Sleep When I'm Dead (LO'99 Remix)	Non-album single	April 19, 2024	Sweat It Out
Torren Foot & Associanu	Sleep When I'm Dead (Tony Romera Remix)	Non-album single	June 7, 2024	Sweat It Out
Associanu	Me Time in Milano	Non-album single	November 22, 2024	dh2

=== Remixes & covers ===
Artist	Song	Remix	Release date	Label
Beyoncé	Control	Redlight a.k.a. Betatraxx Remix	September 16, 2009	Self Released
LMFAO	I'm In Miami Bitch	Redlight Remix	September 16, 2009	Self Released
Boys Noize	Jeffer	Redlight 'I NEED MORE COWBELL' Edit	September 16, 2009	Self Released
Steve Winwood	Higher Love	Redlight a.k.a. Betatraxx Remix	September 16, 2009	Self Released
Vampire Weekend	Ottoman	BetaTraxx Remix	September 21, 2009	Self Released
Ladyhawke	My Delirium	Betatraxx Remix	September 27, 2009	Self Released
John Roman	Martyr	Redlight a.k.a. BetaTraxx Remix	October 20, 2009	Self Released
Jabup	Fireflies	BetatraXx Cover	October 26, 2009	Self Released
Kid Sister	Life On TV	Redlight a.k.a. BetaTraxx Remix	November 18, 2009	Self Released
Kings Of Convenience	I'd Rather Dance	Redlight a.k.a. BetaTraxx Remix	November 18, 2009	Self Released
Lady Gaga	Paparazzi	Redlight a.k.a. BetaTraxx Remix	November 18, 2009	Self Released
Robin S.	Show Me Love	Redlight a.k.a. BetaTraxx Remix	December 5, 2009	Self Released
Junior Senior	Move Your Feet	Redlight a.k.a. BetaTraxx Remix	December 17, 2009	Self Released
Boris Dlugosch	Bangkok	Redlight a.k.a. BetaTraxx Remix	January 26, 2010	Self Released
Little Boots	Every Little Earthquake	Redlight a.k.a. BetaTraxx Remix	January 27, 2010	Self Released
Kesha	Blah Blah Blah	Redlight a.k.a. BetaTraxx Remix	February 23, 2010	Self Released
Two Door Cinema Club	What You Need	Redlight a.k.a. BetaTraxx Remix	March 16, 2010	Self Released
Supermode	Tell Me Why	BetatraXx Remix	March 29, 2010	Self Released
Frederico Franchi	Cream	Redlight a.k.a. BetaTraxx Remix	April 9, 2010	Self Released
David Guetta	Love Don't Let Me Go	BetaTraxx Remix	June 26, 2010	Self Released
deadmau5	Some Chords	BetaTraxx Remix	June 28, 2010	Self Released
Kelis	4th Of July	BetaTraxx Remix	August 2, 2010	Self Released
Justice vs. Simian	We Are Your Friends	BetatraXx Remix	October 7, 2010	Self Released
Metric	Gold Guns Girls	BetatraXx Remix	October 26, 2010	Self Released
Dada Life	Unleash The Fucking Dada	BetatraXx ft. Krystal Remix	December 1, 2010	Self Released
Lonsdale Boys Club	Weekend	BetatraXx Remix	December 25, 2010	Self Released
Bomfunk MC's	Freestyler	BetatraXx Remix	March 14, 2011	Self Released
fun. & Janelle Monáe	We Are Young	Betatraxx Remix	May 1, 2012	Fueled By Ramen
Christina Perri	Arms	Betatraxx Remix	May 15, 2012	Atlantic
The Joy Formidable	Cholla	Betatraxx Remix	October 22, 2012	Atlantic
alt-J	Fitzpleasure	Betatraxx Remix	November 28, 2012	Canvasback
Wiz Khalifa	No Sleep	Betatraxx Remix	June 5, 2013	Self Released
Betatraxx & MARINA	Electra Heart	Betatraxx Remix	May 13, 2014	Self Released
Pr0files	Forgive	Betatraxx Remix	November 12, 2014	Self Released
Janet Jackson	No Sleeep (Note: Nelson's remix has it stylized as "No Sleep")	Karma Fields Remix	April 7, 2016	Self Released
Tove Lo	WTF Love Is	Karma Fields Remix	December 17, 2018	Universal
Winona Oak	He Don't Love Me	Karma Fields Remix	January 31, 2020	Atlantic
Culture Club	Do You Really Want To Hurt Me	Karma Fields & Shey Baba Cover	September 23, 2020	Self Released
Karma Fields & Shey Baba	Dreams	Associanu Remix	February 26, 2021	Self Released / DREAMS
PRICIE	BIG GIRLS	Karma Fields Remix	December 16, 2022	Sweat It Out
PRICIE	BIG GIRLS	Karma Fields Remix Edit	February 24, 2023	Sweat It Out
Cassie	Me & U	Karma Fields Cover	June 16, 2023	Sweat It Out
Tove Lo	Disco Tits	Karma Fields Remix	September 7, 2023	Universal
Torren Foot	Candy	Karma Fields Dub	December 1, 2023	Sweat It Out
Icona Pop	Stick Your Tongue Out	Karma Fields Original Edit	December 1, 2023	Ultra Records

=== Writing and production credits (as TimFromTheHouse) ===
Artist	Song	Album	Release date	Credit	Label
Pussy Riot, VÉRITÉ, & LATASHÁ	LAUGH IT OFF	Non-album single	March 8, 2022	Writing and production	Neon Gold
Pussy Riot	PUNISH	MATRIARCHY NOW	August 5, 2022	Writing and production	Neon Gold
5 Seconds of Summer	COMPLETE MESS	5SOS5	September 23, 2022	Production	BMG
Tove Lo	True Romance	Dirt Femme	October 14, 2022	Writing and production	Pretty Swede Records
Tove Lo	Grapefruit	Dirt Femme	October 14, 2022	Writing and production	Pretty Swede Records
Tove Lo	Kick In The Head	Dirt Femme	October 14, 2022	Writing and production	Pretty Swede Records
Tove Lo	How Long	Dirt Femme	October 14, 2022	Writing and production	Pretty Swede Records
UPSAHL	Toast	Sagittarius	December 9, 2022	Writing	Arista Records
Kyle Lux	Lover Loaded Fantasy	Cascade	April 19, 2023	Writing and production	Self Released
Kyle Lux	Like Me	Cascade	April 19, 2023	Writing and production	Self Released
Tove Lo	Grapefruit (Stripped at home)	Dirt Femme (Stripped)	May 5, 2023	Writing and production	Pretty Swede Records
Tove Lo	How Long (Stripped at home)	Dirt Femme (Stripped)	May 5, 2023	Writing and production	Pretty Swede Records
Tove Lo	I like u	Non-album single	May 31, 2023	Writing and production	Pretty Swede Records
Tove Lo	I like u (ELIO Remix)	I like u (Remixes)	June 23, 2023	Writing and production	Pretty Swede Records
Tove Lo	I like u (Dorian Electra Remix)	I like u (Remixes)	July 7, 2023	Writing and production	Pretty Swede Records
Tove Lo	I like u (Melanie C x Emergency_Loop Remix)	I like u (Remixes)	July 20, 2023	Writing and production	Pretty Swede Records
Tove Lo	I like u (Extended)	I like u (Remixes)	July 21, 2023	Writing and production	Pretty Swede Records
Daya	Juliene	Non-album single	June 30, 2023	Writing and production	Daya LLC
Aluna	The Way I'm Wired	MYCELiUM	July 7, 2023	Writing and production	Mad Decent
Malou	Lying	Non-album single	August 11, 2023	Writing and production	Warner Music Group
Icona Pop	Stick Your Tongue Out	Club Romantech	September 1, 2023	Writing and production	Ultra Records
XYLØ	A Girl Like Me Should Never Be Left Alone	Non-album single	November 17, 2023	Writing and production	Pretty Records
girli	Overthinking	Matriarchy	May 17, 2024	Writing and production	AllPoints / Believe
George Daniel	Screen Cleaner	Non-album single	August 2, 2024	Writing and production	dh2
Emei	ALL THESE KIDS	RABBITHOLE	September 20, 2024	Writing and production	Amuseio AB
Charli xcx	Club classics featuring bb trickz	Brat and it's completely different but also still brat	October 11, 2024	Writing and production	Atlantic
George Daniel	Chlorine	Non-album single	November 1, 2024	Writing and production	dh2
Isabel LaRosa	The Things That I Would Do To Be Enough For You	Promising Young Woman	June 26, 2026	Writing and production	RCA Records
