= Matriarchy Now =

2022 mixtape by Pussy Riot

Mixtape by Pussy Riot
- Released: 5 August 2022
- Genre: Dance-pop; hyperpop
- Length: 19:07
- Label: Neon Gold
- Producer: Bendik Moller; TimFromTheHouse; Gold Glove; Midi Jones; Jeff Hazin; Elie Jay Rizk

Pussy Riot chronology
Rage Remixes (2021)	Matriarchy Now (2022)

Professional ratings
Review scores
Source	Rating
Financial Times	4/5 stars
The Guardian	3/5 stars
Pitchfork	5.3/10

Matriarchy Now is the debut mixtape by Russian feminist protest and performance art group Pussy Riot. It was released on 5 August 2022 through Neon Gold Records.

== Track listing ==
All tracks are produced by Gold Glove except where noted.

Matriarchy Now track listing
No.	Title	Writer(s)	Producer(s)	Length
1.	"Princess Charming" (with Salem Ilese)	Salem Ilese Davern; Bendik Moller; Nadya Tolokonnikova	Moller	2:16
2.	"Punish"	Jaramye Daniels; Tolokonnikova; Tim Nelson; Tove Lo	TimFromTheHouse	2:50
3.	"Plastic" (with ILoveMakonnen)	Boyfriend; Makonnen; Miles Comaskey; Tolokonnikova; Owen Hobson		2:43
4.	"Horny" (with Phoebe Ryan)	Boyfriend; Jeff Hazin; Midi Jones; Tolokonnikova; Phoebe Ryan	Jones; Hazin	2:46
5.	"Sugar Mommy" (with Mazie)	Elie Jay Rizk; Grace Christian; Tolokonnikova	Rizk	1:58
6.	"Hatefuck" (with Slayyyter)	Boyfriend; Comaskey; Tolokonnikova; Hobson; Ryan Chavez; Slayyyter		3:16
7.	"Poof Bitch" (with Big Freedia)	Big Freedia; Boyfriend; Comaskey; Tolokonnikova; Hobson		3:15
Total length:				19:07
