= Electric Gardens =

- Genre: Rock, Alternative rock, Punk rock, Indie rock, Dance
- Dates: August; Jan/Feb/March
- Locations: Kent, England Sydney, Australia
- Years active: 2006 - 2007 2016 - Present
- Website: www.egfest.com www.electricgardens.com.au

Electric Gardens, (Electric Gardens Festival), sometimes abbreviated to 'EGFestival', or 'EGFest', or sometimes simply 'EG', was a medium-sized 'Boutique' Music Festival situated at Mount Ephraim, Faversham in Kent. The event was held on a weekend in early August in 2006 and 2007.

Electric Gardens 2008 was cancelled due to unforeseen circumstances. In February 2008 a key player in organising the event was taken to hospital with a life-threatening illness. With no foreseeable date as to when he would be allowed home, let alone back to work, the organisers were forced to cancel.

In 2016, Electric Gardens Festival was launched in Sydney, Australia - only connected in name to the original festival in the UK. The festival was on Saturday 23 January and featured International DJs across 3 stages in Centennial Parklands, headlined by Fatboy Slim with smaller events held in Brisbane and Perth. In 2017, the festival returned, this time headlined by Eric Prydz with events in Sydney, Melbourne, Brisbane and Perth. In 2018, Fatboy Slim once again headlined with events in Sydney, Melbourne, Brisbane, Perth and, for the first time, expanding to Adelaide and Auckland, New Zealand. In 2019, the festival returned to its home in Sydney, headlined by Sigma (DJs). On Saturday 22 February 2020, it once again returned to Sydney, headlined by Craig David, weeks before the COVID-19 pandemic would cancel events in the proceeding 3 years. After a three-year hiatus due to the COVID-19 pandemic, in 2024, the Electric Gardens brand returns to Sydney, with sister events in Melbourne (Electric Beach) and Perth (Electric Island), this time headlined by Armand Van Helden.

== The Myspace Bus ==
At the UK festival, an inactive bus was parked at the festival grounds, provided by Myspace, in which the artists and bands were available to meet. Free gifts and information are also available from here.

== Line ups by year ==
=== 2006 ===
==== Main Stage ====
Saturday

- Southern Fried Records Stage
- Audio Bullys
- Armand Van Helden
- Cassius (DJ set)
- Cagedbaby
- Grandadbob
- Touché
- Nathan Detroit

Sunday

- The Charlatans
- Morning Runner
- The Automatic
- The Young Knives
- The Fratellis
- The Boy Least Likely To
- The Long Blondes

==== Unspecified Stages ====
Saturday

- Archie Bronson Outfit
- The Elegant Bachelors
- Audio Bullys
- Layo & Bushwacka!
- Armand Van Helden
- Stanton Warriors
- Plump DJs
- Caged Baby
- Soho Dolls
- Grant Dee
- Mezza Breaks
- Cassius
- Veto Silver
- Marcus Wallis
- Touché
- Warren Suicide
- Nathan Detroit
- Paul Arnold
- Chew The Fat!
- Grandadbob
- Southern Fried

Sunday

- The Charlatans
- The Automatic
- Morning Runner
- The Fratellis
- The Long Blondes
- The Earlies
- The Boy Least Likely To
- Brakes
- Battle
- Jamie T
- Adem
- Field Music
- Findlay Brown
- Duels
- The Electric Soft Parade
- The Veils
- Mohair
- Larrikin Love
- The Young Knives
- Kid Harpoon
- Eyoe

=== 2007 ===
==== Main Stage ====
Saturday

- Supergrass
- Calvin Harris
- The Pipettes
- Kate Nash
- Pull Tiger Tail
- Blood Red Shoes
- Jonny Flynn
- Reverend and the Makers
- Palladium

Sunday

- Happy Mondays
- The Rakes
- The Young Knives
- The Maccabees
- Noisettes
- Hot Club de Paris
- Milburn (band)
- Sonic Hearts

==== Second stage ====
Saturday

- Plan B (rapper)
- New Young Pony Club
- The Holloways
- Lethal Bizzle
- Foals
- Peggy sue and the pirates
- Video Nasties
- Newton Faulkner
- Ciara Haidar

Sunday

- Patrick Wolf
- Jack Peñate
- Mr Hudson & The Library
- Kid Harpoon
- The Teenagers
- Late of the Pier
- Laura Marling
- Ox.Eagle.Lion.Man
- The Sylvias

==== Myspace Stage ====
Saturday

- Good Books
- Lupen Crook
- Beans on Toast
- Nic Dawson Kelly
- Gillan Edgar
- Tom Allalone and the Great Expectations
- Thom Stone
- Poetry by Dockers MC
- Scroobius Pip
- The Thirst
- Stuart James
- Eleanor Goulding

Sunday

- Underground Heros
- Devils Gun
- Sparrows
- Chineapples
- Rosemary
- Maker
- The Long Weekend
- Our Name is Legion
- Letters from London
- The Cut Outs

==== Club Class Dance Stage ====
Saturday

- Slam (band)
- Stanton Warriors
- Nic Fanciulli
- Meat Katie
- Mike Pickering
- A Skillz
- Mark Fanciulli & Small Fry
- Shake DJs
- Mezza Breaks

Sunday

- Danny Howells
- Funk D'Void
- Justin Robertson
- Damian Lazarus
- Desyn Masiello
- Micky Slim
- Sam Ball & Anil Chawla
- Pete Griffiths & George Andrews
- Warning: 2 Dirty DJs
- Rebel Beat Allies
