= Singles (The Long Blondes album) =

Compilation album by The Long Blondes
- Released: 20 October 2008
- Genre: Indie rock
- Label: Angular Records

The Long Blondes chronology
| Couples (2008) | "Singles" (2008) |

"Singles" is a compilation album released by the Sheffield band The Long Blondes on 8 October 2008 via Angular Records. The 12-track album collates all of the songs from the band's singles prior to their signing to Rough Trade Records in April 2006, released by various independent record labels. The compilation was released on the same day as the band's dissolution, and the album's inlay contained the news.

"Singles" was named the 25th best album of 2008 by Artrocker magazine.

== Background ==
Professional ratings
Review scores
| Source | Rating |
|---|---|
| BBC Music | positive |
| NME | (8/10) |
| Pitchfork Media | (7.4/10) |
| The Quietus | positive |
| Stranger | positive |

The compilation features the previously unreleased song "Peterborough" and an alternate version of "Separated By Motorways". This version of "Separated By Motorways" differs from the single release, with the group opting to include Alan Smyth's demo version instead. The compilation also features rare information, pictures and early interviews with the band.

"New Idols" and "Long Blonde" were originally released by Thee Sheffield Phonographic Corporation on bubblegum pink vinyl as a double A-side. The latter was also featured on a split 7-inch with The Boyfriends on Filthy Little Angels (which also featured "Autonomy Boy"). These were followed by two singles on Angular Records; "Giddy Stratospheres" (backed by "Polly" and "Darts") and "Appropriation (By Any Other Name)" (backed by "My Heart Is Out of Bounds" and "Lust in the Movies"). "Giddy Stratospheres" was also released in the US on 12-inch by What's Your Rupture?, featuring the three tracks included on the UK version, plus '"Autonomy Boy". The band's final release before signing to Rough Trade was "Separated By Motorways", which came out on Paul Epworth's Good & Evil Records backed by "Big Infatuation".

== Album cover ==
The album's artwork is a painting by lead singer Kate Jackson.

== Track listing ==
1. "New Idols" – 3:05
2. "Long Blonde" – 3:29
3. "Autonomy Boy" – 3:31
4. "Giddy Stratospheres" – 4:48
5. "Polly" – 2:47
6. "Darts" – 1:27
7. "Appropriation (By Any Other Name)" – 3:01
8. "My Heart Is Out Of Bounds" – 2:23
9. "Lust In The Movies" – 3:00
10. "Separated By Motorways" (Demo) – 2:14
11. "Big Infatuation" – 2:31
12. "Peterborough" – 2:20

== Personnel ==
The Long Blondes

- Emma Chaplin – guitars, keyboards, vocals
- Dorian Cox – guitars, keyboards, vocals, lyrics except on tracks 6, 8 (With Jackson), 10, 11 and 12
- Reenie Hollis – bass guitar, vocals
- Kate Jackson – lead vocals, lyrics on tracks 6, 8 (With Cox), 10, 11 and 12, artwork
- Screech Louder – drums
