= Appropriation (By Any Other Name) =

"The Long Blondes"

Single by The Long Blondes
- Released: 13 June 2005
- Genre: Indie rock
- Label: Angular Recording
- Songwriter(s): Dorian Cox, Kate Jackson
- Producer(s): Alan Smith

The Long Blondes singles chronology
"Giddy Stratospheres" (2004)	"The Long Blondes" (2005)	"Separated By Motorways" (2005)

"Appropriation (By Any Other Name)" is a 7-inch single and CD release by Sheffield band the Long Blondes. It was released on 13 June 2005 on Angular Records. The song is a homage to Hitchcock's 1958 film Vertigo. it has been said that this song is told from the point of view of Judy, due to lines such as "When I met you, I never wore dresses like that" and "You can't have me, make me act the same".

Lead singer Kate Jackson painted two different portraits for the CD single and 7-inch single. They both depicted Kim Novak's characters Madeleine Elster and Judy Barton. The song was not featured on their debut album Someone to Drive You Home, but the b-side, Lust In The Movies was. Both were featured on the compilation album "Singles". The song was well received by critics.

== Track listing ==
All lyrics written by Dorian Cox and Kate Jackson, music by the Long Blondes.

- 7-inch single
1. Side A "Appropriation (By Any Other Name)"
2. Side B "Lust In The Movies"
- CD
1. "Appropriation (By Any Other Name)"
2. "My Heart Is Out Of Bounds"
3. "Lust In The Movies"
