= Century (The Long Blondes song) =

Single by The Long Blondes

from the album "Couples"
- Released: (United Kingdom) 24 March 2008
- Recorded: August 2007–December 2007
- Genre: Indie rock
- Label: Rough Trade
- Songwriters: Kate Jackson, Dorian Cox
- Producer: Erol Alkan

The Long Blondes singles chronology
"Giddy Stratospheres" (2007)	"Century" (2008)	"Guilt" (2008)

Century is a song by English band The Long Blondes and the first single from their second album Couples. It was released on 24 March 2008 as a limited edition 7" single and digital download.

The b-side to "Century", "The Unbearable Lightness of Buildings", was written specifically for Tate Modern as part of their 12-week-long Tate Tracks that was held at the beginning of April 2007. The idea was Tate invited The Long Blondes to walk around the gallery and find a work of art that would inspire them to write a track. In the end, it was Jannis Kounellis's Untitled that grabbed their attention. They said "Untitled caught our eye because we saw the stark industrial landscape and pictured ourselves within it".

== Track listing ==
A: "Century"
B: "The Unbearable Lightness of Buildings"

All lyrics written by Kate Jackson and Dorian Cox, music by The Long Blondes.
