= NME's Cool List =

Annual listing of popular musicians compiled by the weekly British music magazine NME

"Whether it is wearing the right clothes, being magnetically charismatic or deliberately trashing their talent for the sake of it, all of the entries in [the Cool List] have one thing in common – the X factor."

— NME editor Conor McNicholas, speaking in 2003

NME's Cool List was an annual listing of popular musicians compiled by the weekly British music magazine NME. The list was created each November by the magazine's writers and journalists, and was based on the 50 musicians that they considered to be the "coolest". Each year's list was first announced by NME through both a dedicated issue of their magazine and their official website, NME.com – the Cool List issue often attracted high sales. The first list was published on 29 October 2002, to highlight the people who were "at the forefront of the music scene" – Jack White, the lead singer of American rock band The White Stripes, topped the first poll. Since then, it was published a further eight times: it ran every year from 2003 to 2011, with the exception of 2009. Musicians such as Justin Timberlake, Pete Doherty and Laura Marling topped these subsequent listings. The final artist to top NME's Cool List was the American rapper Azealia Banks in 2011.

Alongside the Cool List, NME also often concurrently published alternative lists, such as the Fool List, the Had It, Lost It list, the If Only They Rocked list, and the Cool Places list. Fool Lists included individuals such as George W. Bush and Mark Ronson; Had It, Lost It lists featured Bobby Gillespie and Richard Archer; If Only They Rocked lists included the likes of Ferenc Gyurcsány and Charlie Brooker. As well as high sales, the Cool List also generated a large critical response for NME, from both journalists and members of the public: the magazine received criticism of its lists from various sources, including music journalists, pop stars, and drugs charities.

== History ==
NME's first Cool List was compiled in 2002, with its inaugural winner being Jack White, the lead singer of The White Stripes. White topped the list for "turning down Gap, his rediscovery of rock's debt to the blues, and for being the fire that torched the whole new rock revolution". The American pop star Justin Timberlake topped the second Cool List in 2003, with the magazine praising his "killer career moves, genuine talent, charm and good looks". Deputy editor Alex Needham remarked: "In a world of moaning micro-celebs, Justin makes being a superstar look the most fun you could have with your clothes half off."

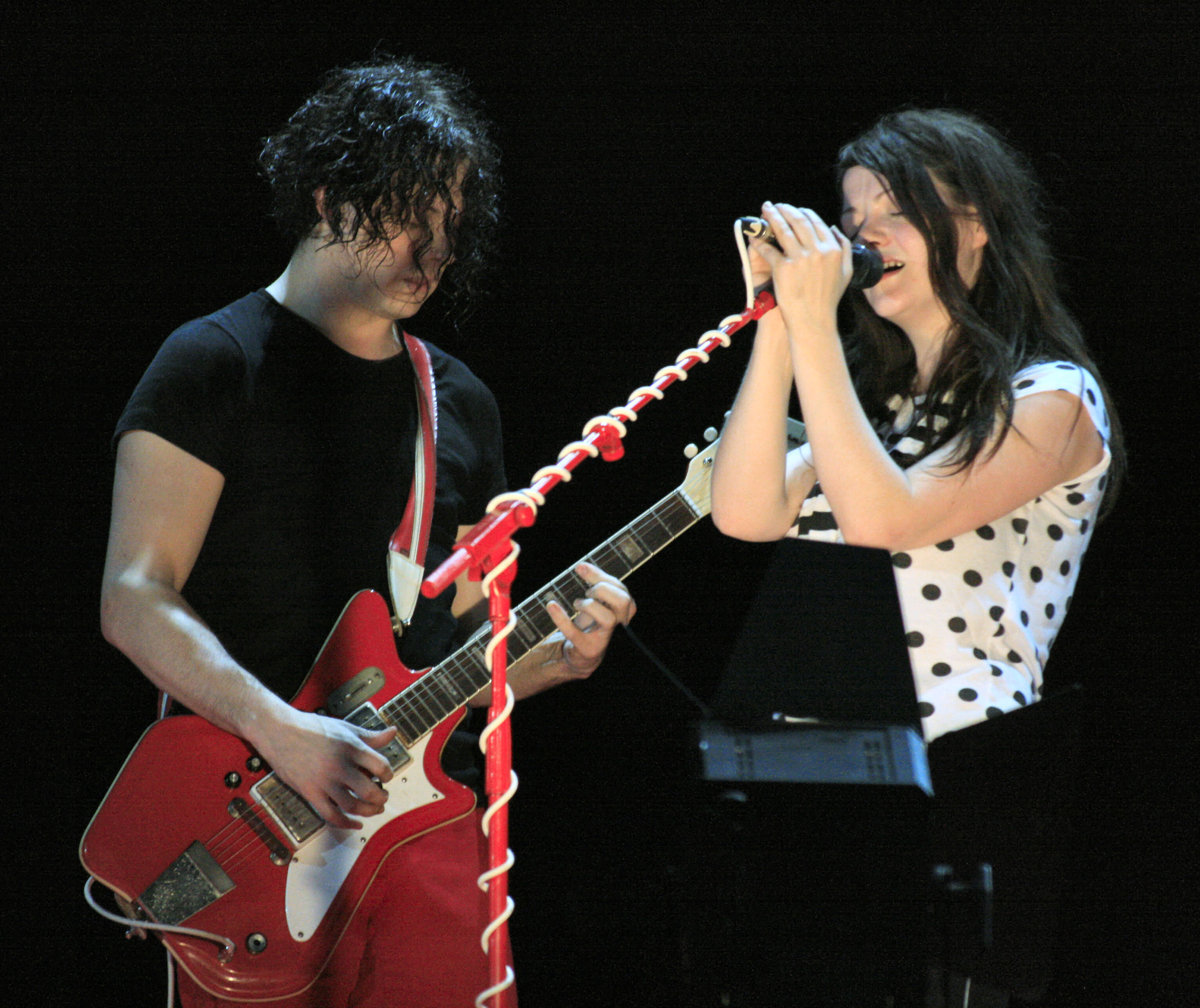
Jack White (left) topped the first ever Cool List in 2002. His bandmate Meg White (right) was placed at number six, climbing to number three the following year.

Carl Barât of The Libertines was placed at number five on the 2003 Cool List. The following year he rose to number one alongside his bandmate Pete Doherty, the first and (as of 2013) only time the list has been topped by more than one person. To commemorate the 2004 list, the cover of the NME issue promoting it was a 3D lenticular image of Doherty, which the magazine claimed was a "world first". The year after, Alex Turner, the lead singer of British indie rock band Arctic Monkeys, was named the coolest person of the year, with NME citing his "authenticity" as the reason for his placing. Turner would go on to feature in a further four Cool Lists, including at number six in 2007 and number four in 2008.

The first woman to top the Cool List was Beth Ditto, the lead singer of American band The Gossip, in 2006. The 2006 list was noted as the most female-oriented to date, with five women in the top ten. NME described Ditto as "a true product of the underground", with Needham hailing her "voice like Tina Turner gargling ball bearings" and her "megawatt stage presence". Writing for The Observer, music journalist Kitty Empire remarked that "placing Beth Ditto at the top of the Cool List is an audacious move that shows NME is finally questioning its institutional chap-ism". Recounting The Gossip's rise to success in her memoir Coal to Diamonds, Ditto cited topping the Cool List as the moment "when things got weird".

Ditto was placed at number nine in the 2007 Cool List, which was celebrated as the "oldest ever" – its entries had a combined age of 1,389 (approximately 28 years each). The list was topped by 23-year-old Gallows frontman Frank Carter, who celebrated by planning a tattoo on his leg that proclaimed "Fuck the NME". The following year's Top 50 was published exclusively on NME.com, with only the Top 10 featuring in the magazine. Like its previous year, the 2008 list was praised for its inclusion of "old rockers", such as Peter Gabriel, Robert Plant and Johnny Marr. It was topped by 20-year-old Crystal Castles singer Alice Glass.

No Cool List was published in 2009 – it returned the following year as an expanded Top 75, with the British folk singer Laura Marling reaching number one. The final artist to top the Cool List was Azealia Banks, who was named the coolest person of the year in 2011. NME hailed Banks for her "youthful rebellion" and her "can-do, fuck-you attitude". Accepting the honour, Banks remarked: "I'm fucking talented."

== Cool List winners ==
Cool Lists
Year	Artist (Band)	Top ten	Ref.
2002	Jack White (The White Stripes)	2nd: Fabrizio Moretti (The Strokes); 3rd: Dolf de Datsun (The Datsuns); 4th: Karen O (Yeah Yeah Yeahs); 5th: Mike Skinner (The Streets); 6th: Meg White (The White Stripes); 7th: Marcie Bolen (The Von Bondies); 8th: Craig Nicholls (The Vines); 9th: Nelly; 10th: Pelle Almqvist (The Hives)	
2003	Justin Timberlake	2nd: Brody Dalle (The Distillers); 3rd: Meg White (The White Stripes); 4th: Caleb Followill (Kings of Leon); 5th: Carl Barât (The Libertines); 6th: Peaches; 7th: Chris Cester (Jet); 8th: Beyoncé; 9th: Albert Hammond, Jr. (The Strokes); 10th: Karen O (Yeah Yeah Yeahs)	
2004	Pete Doherty; Carl Barât (The Libertines)	2nd: Mike Skinner (The Streets); 3rd: Eminem; 4th: Johnny Borrell (Razorlight); 5th: Nick McCarthy (Franz Ferdinand); 6th: Morrissey; 7th: Kele Okereke (Bloc Party); 8th: Martin Tomlinson (Selfish Cunt); 9th: Brandon Flowers (The Killers); 10th: Ana Matronic (Scissor Sisters)	
2005	Alex Turner (Arctic Monkeys)	2nd: Liam Gallagher (Oasis); 3rd: Kanye West; 4th: Antony Hegarty (Antony and the Johnsons); 5th: Brandon Flowers (The Killers); 6th: Devendra Banhart; 7th: Pete Doherty (Babyshambles); 8th: Jemina Pearl (Be Your Own Pet); 9th: Bob Dylan; 10th: Carl Barât (Dirty Pretty Things)	
2006	Beth Ditto (The Gossip)	2nd: Faris Rotter (The Horrors); 3rd: Lily Allen; 4th: Jarvis Cocker; 5th: Karen O (Yeah Yeah Yeahs); 6th: Kieren Webster (The View); 7th: Kate Jackson (The Long Blondes); 8th: Gerard Way (My Chemical Romance); 9th: Thom Yorke (Radiohead); 10th: Lovefoxxx (CSS)	
2007	Frank Carter (Gallows)	2nd: Jamie Reynolds (Klaxons); 3rd: Lovefoxxx (CSS); 4th: Ryan Jarman (The Cribs); 5th: Lethal Bizzle; 6th: Alex Turner (Arctic Monkeys); 7th: Kate Nash; 8th: Amy Winehouse; 9th: Beth Ditto (The Gossip); 10th: Keith Richards (The Rolling Stones)	
2008	Alice Glass (Crystal Castles)	2nd: Jay-Z; 3rd: Andrew VanWyngarden (MGMT); 4th: Alex Turner (Arctic Monkeys/The Last Shadow Puppets); 5th: Sam Dust (Late of the Pier); 6th: Ladyhawke; 7th: Caleb Followill (Kings of Leon); 8th: M.I.A.; 9th: Liam Gallagher (Oasis); 10th: Caroline McKay (Glasvegas)	
2010	Laura Marling	2nd: Janelle Monáe; 3rd: Kanye West; 4th: Bethany Cosentino (Best Coast); 5th: Romy Madley Croft (The xx); 6th: Paul Weller; 7th: Jonathan Pierce (The Drums); 8th: Jack Barnett (These New Puritans); 9th: Carl Barât; 10th: Darwin Deez	
2011	Azealia Banks	2nd: Jarvis Cocker (Pulp); 3rd: Honor Titus (Cerebral Ballzy); 4th: Tom Meighan (Kasabian); 4th: Sergio Pizzorno (Kasabian) (Note: Tom Meighan and Sergio Pizzorno of Kasabian were jointly awarded fourth position on the 2011 Cool List.); 6th: Lana Del Rey; 7th: Rhys Webb (The Horrors); 8th: Theo Hutchcraft (Hurts); 9th: Matt Helders (Arctic Monkeys); 10th: Ellery Roberts (WU LYF)	

== Alternative lists ==
In conjunction with their Cool Lists, NME also often concurrently published four alternative lists to highlight the "other end of the spectrum": the Fool List, the Had It, Lost It list, the If Only They Rocked list, and the Cool Places list.

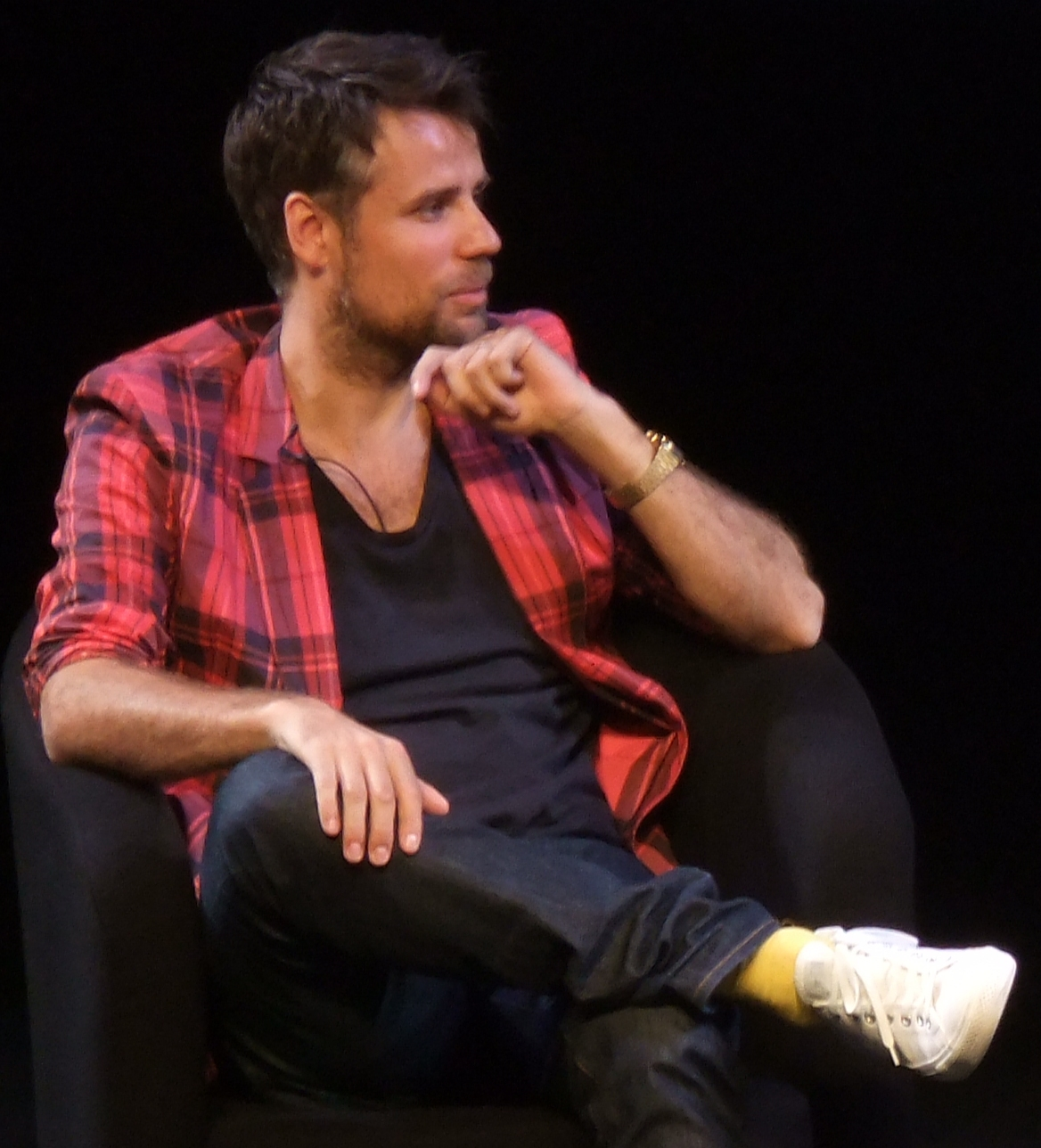
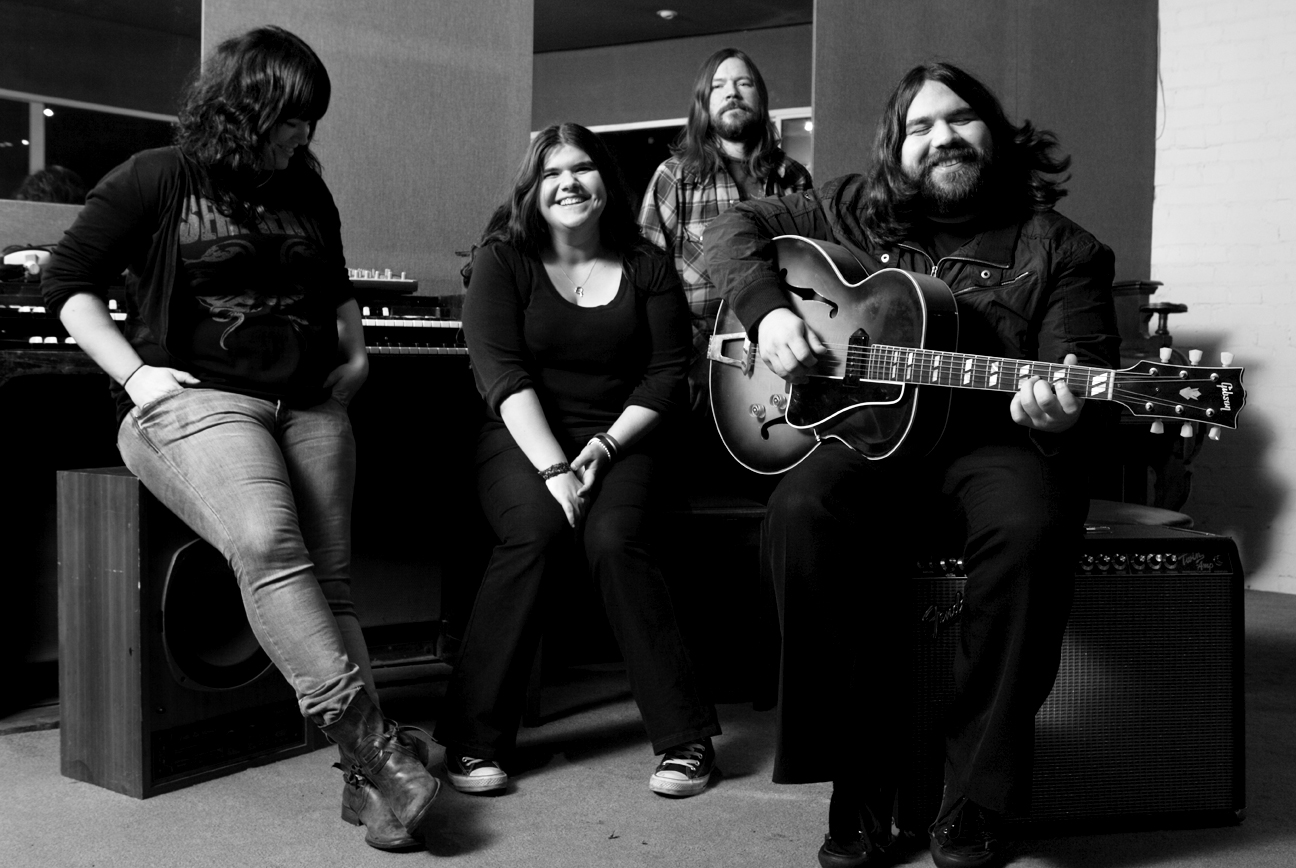
The British broadcaster Richard Bacon (left) topped the Fool List in 2005 for remarks that he made about the British indie band The Magic Numbers (right) during the recording of an episode of Top of the Pops.

The Fool List ranked the "10 most uncool people", and was published alongside every Cool List, with the exceptions of 2003, 2006 and 2008. The first list was titled the "They Think They're Cool... But Aren't" list, and was topped by British pop star Robbie Williams. NME's Nicola Wood explained that Williams "permanently [tried] to display this image of being hip and cool", and that his lyrics were not "as up to date as they used to be". Subsequent Fool List toppers have included US president George W. Bush (2004), and broadcaster Richard Bacon (2005). The 2007 Fool List was topped by musician Mark Ronson – upon finding out, Ronson remarked: "This kind of sucks."

The Had It, Lost It list charted the people who "used to be cool, but now aren't". It was first published in 2002, and was compiled with each Cool List since then. The first listing was topped by Bobby Gillespie, the lead singer of British indie band Primal Scream, for having "chickened out" over the title of his track "Bomb the Pentagon", and instead renaming it "Rise". Richard Archer, frontman for indie rock band Hard-Fi, topped the list in 2007 for "[dressing] like an 11-plus drop out". The final list-toppers were the British band Gallows, who were placed first on the 2011 list. Explaining the choice, NME stated: "Without the mad ginger bloke shouting and jumping off the railings, we're just not having it."

The If Only They Rocked list recorded the "10 coolest non-musicians", and included comedians, actors, footballers, fictional characters, and cats. Its first winner, in 2002, was Jackass star Johnny Knoxville, whom the magazine hailed as an "extreme dude". It has since been published alongside every Cool List except 2003 – its winners have included Hungarian Prime Minister Ferenc Gyurcsány, TV critic Charlie Brooker, and a pigeon. Italian footballer Mario Balotelli topped the 2011 listing for being "mean, moody, [and] fond of indoor firework displays".

The Cool Places list was first compiled in 2003, and comprised two separate charts: "Cool Places in the UK" and "Cool Places the World Over", with Leeds and Berlin topping them respectively. The two charts were consolidated into a single "Cool Places" list in 2004, which was topped by the extension housing the record collection of recently deceased DJ John Peel. The Cool Places list was compiled a further two times, before being retired in 2008.

Fool Lists
Year	Person	Top ten	Ref.
2002 (Note: Titled the "They Think They're Cool... But Aren't" list)	Robbie Williams	2nd: Fischerspooner; 3rd: Shirley Manson (Garbage); 4th: Kelly Jones (Stereophonics); 5th: P. Diddy; 6th: Fred Durst (Limp Bizkit); 7th: Keith Richards (The Rolling Stones); 8th: Paul Oakenfold; 9th: Blazin' Squad; 10th: Britney Spears	
2004	George W. Bush	2nd: Pete Waterman; 3rd: 50 Cent; 4th: Abi Titmuss; 5th: Missy Elliott; 6th: Stuart Cable; 7th: Tom Chaplin (Keane); 8th: Justin Hawkins (The Darkness); 9th: Robert Kilroy-Silk; 10th: Jesus	
2005	Richard Bacon	2nd: David Cameron; 3rd: Prince Harry; 4th: Michael Jackson's jury; 5th: The Who; 6th: George W. Bush; 7th: Coca-Cola; 8th: James Mullord; 9th: Tim Westwood; 10th: James Blunt	
2007	Mark Ronson	2nd: Johnny Borrell (Razorlight); 3rd: Blake Fielder-Civil; 4th: George W. Bush; 5th: David Cameron; 6th: Jeremy Clarkson; 7th: Kate Silverton; 8th: Emily Parr; 9th: Newsagents who turned round a May 2007 issue of NME that displayed a naked Beth Ditto on the front cover; 10th: Boris Johnson	
2010	Chris Moyles	2nd: Insane Clown Posse; 3rd: James Corden; 4th: 50 Cent; 5th: Mary Bale; 6th: Axl Rose (Guns N' Roses)	
2011	Insane Clown Posse	2nd: Ricky Gervais; 3rd: Ed Sheeran; 4th: Michael Pedicone (My Chemical Romance)	

Had It, Lost It
Year	Person	Top ten	Ref.
2002	Bobby Gillespie (Primal Scream)	2nd: Richard Ashcroft (The Verve); 3rd: Eminem; 4th: Jarvis Cocker (Pulp); 5th: Ol' Dirty Bastard; 6th: Thomas Bangalter (Daft Punk); 7th: Jonathan Davis (Korn); 8th: Christina Aguilera; 9th: Madonna; 10th: Liam Howlett (The Prodigy)	
2003	Nick Jago (Black Rebel Motorcycle Club)	2nd: Stuart Cable; 3rd: Kelly Osbourne; 4th: Pete Doherty (The Libertines); 5th: Nelly; 6th: Ryan Adams; 7th: Nikolai Fraiture (The Strokes); 8th: Carlos D (Interpol); 9th: Courtney Love; 10th: Electric Six	
2004	Black Rebel Motorcycle Club	2nd: Craig Nicholls (The Vines); 3rd: Justin Timberlake; 4th: Beyoncé; 5th: Wayne Rooney; 6th: Anyone contemplating a remix of "Take Me Out"; 7th: Busted; 8th: Pubic lice; 9th: Friendster; 10th: Tim Jonze	
2005	Courtney Love	2nd: Eminem; 3rd: Dominic Masters (The Others); 4th: Arsenal F.C.; 5th: Sharon Osbourne; 6th: Goldie Lookin Chain; 7th: Bez; 8th: Selfish Cunt; 9th: Queens of Noize	
2006	Jake Shears (Scissor Sisters)	2nd: Morrissey; 3rd: Dev Hynes; 4th: Ryan Adams; 5th: Gwen Stefani; 6th: Hope of the States; 7th: David Walliams; 8th: "Monster" by The Automatic; 9th: Johnny Borrell (Razorlight); 10th: The Magic Numbers	
2007	Richard Archer (Hard-Fi)	2nd: Sugababes; 3rd: Donny Tourette (Towers of London); 4th: The Libertines; 5th: Kanye West; 6th: Iggy Pop; 7th: Mystery Jets; 8th: Paul Smith (Maxïmo Park); 9th: Paul Mullen (yourcodenameis:milo/The Automatic)	
2008	James Bond	2nd: James Smith (Hadouken!); 3rd: Amy Winehouse; 4th: Releasing albums online; 5th: Band reunions; 6th: Brandon Flowers's moustache	
2010	Moe Tucker	2nd: Nick Clegg; 3rd: Facebook; 4th: Kings of Leon; 5th: Richard Ashcroft; 6th: Interpol; 7th: Eminem	
2011	Gallows	2nd: Darwin Deez; 3rd: Chris Addison; 4th: M.I.A.	

If Only They Rocked
Year	Person	Top ten	Ref.
2002	Johnny Knoxville	2nd: Edward Norton; 3rd: Freddie Ljungberg; 4th: Peter Kay; 5th: Shannyn Sossamon; 6th: Verne Troyer; 7th: Banksy; 8th: Samantha Morton; 9th: Chris Cunningham; 10th: Gavin McInnes	
2004	Scarlett Johansson	2nd: Hedi Slimane; 3rd: Thierry Henry; 4th: Simon Pegg; 5th: Type2error; 6th: David Starkey; 7th: Keira Knightley; 8th: Jim Jarmusch; 9th: Michael Moore; 10th: Sienna Miller	
2005	Larry David	2nd: Charlotte Church; 3rd: Johnny Depp; 4th: Noel Fielding; 5th: Gael García Bernal	
2006	Ferenc Gyurcsány	2nd: Andy Nicholson; 3rd: David Tennant; 4th: Lindsay Lohan; 5th: Hugo Chávez; 6th: Carri Mundane; 7th: Noel Fielding; 8th: David Banda; 9th: Alan Bennett; 10th: Rosie Webster and Craig Harris (Coronation Street)	
2007	Sam Riley	2nd: Bruce Parry; 3rd: Noel Fielding; 4th: Stanley Donwood; 5th: David Gest; 6th: Hugo Chávez; 7th: Flight of the Conchords; 8th: Doris Lessing	
2008	Charlie Brooker	2nd: WALL-E (WALL-E); 3rd: Jon Stewart; 4th: Richard Ayoade; 5th: Heath Ledger; 6th: Omar Little (The Wire); 7th: Super Hans (Peep Show); 8th: Rorschach (Watchmen); 9th: Jimmy Bullard	
2010	The pigeon that took a shit on Jared Followill's face	2nd: Jon Stewart; 3rd: Snacks, Bethany Cosentino's cat; 4th: Orphee, Klaxons' cat; 5th: Don Draper (Mad Men); 6th: Vicky McClure; 7th: James Buckley	
2011	Mario Balotelli	2nd: Vod (Fresh Meat); 3rd: Brian Cox; 4th: Richard Ayoade	

Cool Places
Year	Place	Top ten	Ref.
2003 (in the UK)	Leeds	2nd: Brighton; 3rd: Liverpool; 4th: Glasgow; 5th: Sheffield; 6th: Manchester; 7th: Fowey; 8th: Sunderland; 9th: Stoke Newington	
2003 (the world over)	Berlin	2nd: Los Angeles; 3rd: Beijing; 4th: Rio de Janeiro; 5th: Möja; 6th: Omaha; 7th: Montreal; 8th: Mumbai; 9th: Detroit	
2004	The extension housing John Peel's record collection	2nd: Wat Tham Krabok; 3rd: Glasgow; 4th: The Beyoncé castle at Reading Festival; 5th: The wine bars at Glastonbury Festival; 6th: Omaha; 7th: Aylsham; 8th: Tayyabs; 9th: Manchester; 10th: Montreal	
2005	Yorkshire	2nd: Barcelona; 3rd: Chichester; 4th: Bora Bora; 5th: Eel Pie Island; 6th: Montreal; 7th: Venezuela; 8th: Malaysia; 9th: Lisbon; 10th: Turkmenistan	
2007	Portland, Oregon	2nd: Cardiff; 3rd: Los Angeles; 4th: Wakefield; 5th: St Albans; 6th: Coventry; 7th: Henley-on-Thames; 8th: Brazil; 9th: China; 10th: East London	

== Criticism ==
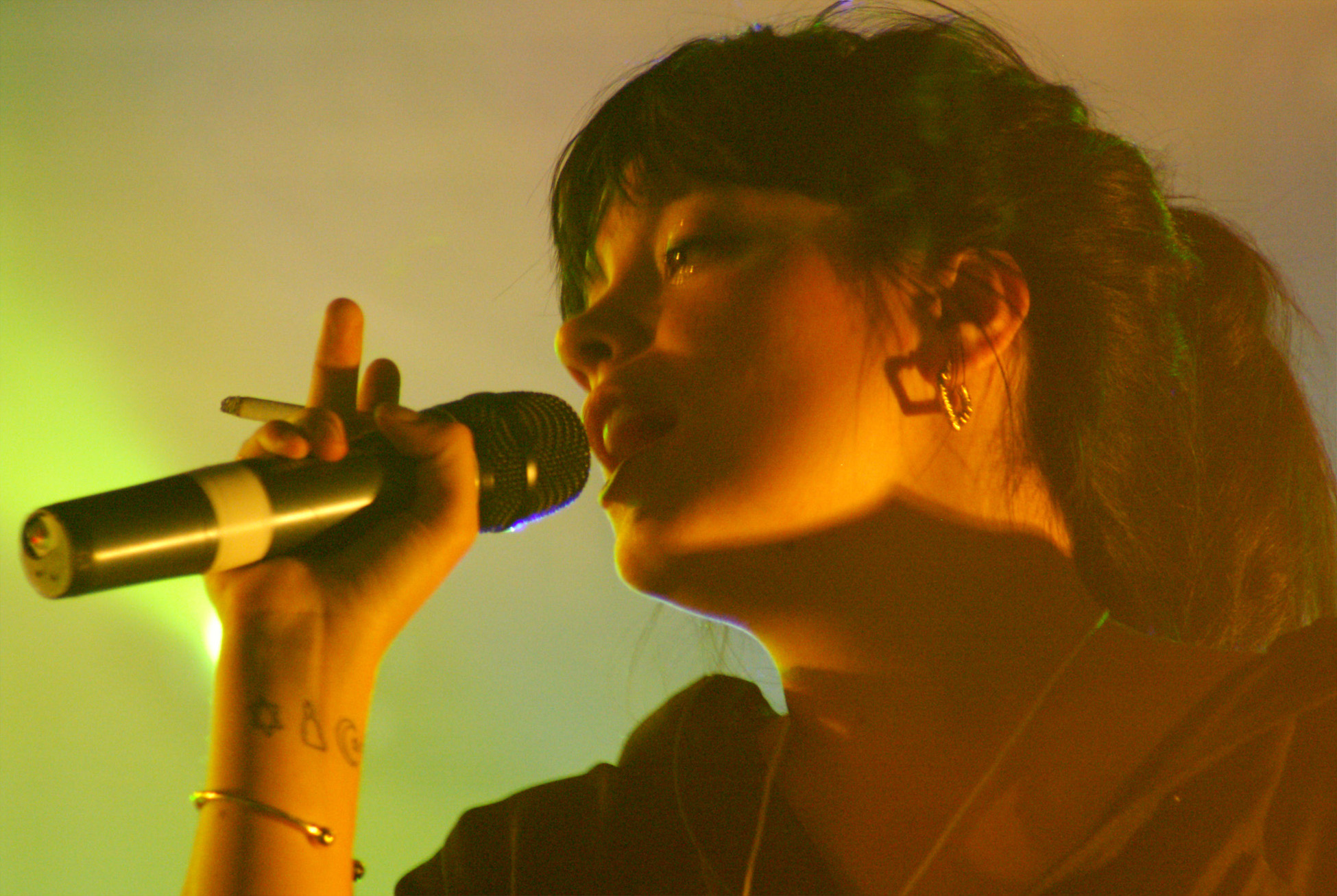
British pop singer Lily Allen labelled NME "sexist" and "patronising" for its coverage of the 2006 Cool List.

According to Neil Robinson, NME's publishing director, the Cool List often generated a "big reaction" from critics – since its introduction in 2002, it attracted responses from several sources. After naming Pete Doherty as the "coolest" person of 2004, the magazine was criticised by drug charities and accused of glamorising drug abuse, as Doherty was, at the time, fighting addictions to both heroin and crack cocaine. Rebecca Cheshire of drugs charity Addaction explained that "young people are vulnerable to hard drugs and not everyone has the ability to fall back on expensive rehabilitation programmes like rock stars." Needham responded by stating that the magazine did not endorse drug abuse, and that it was "not a heroin addiction which makes Pete Doherty the coolest".

Following the publication of the 2006 Cool List, British pop star Lily Allen, who had been placed third that year, slammed the magazine for opting to choose a photograph of rock band Muse for that issue's cover, instead of a photograph of the women who were featured in the list's top ten. Writing on her MySpace blog, Allen branded NME as "patronising" and "sexist". Addressing the magazine directly, Allen declared: "You put Muse on the cover 'cause you thought that your readers might not buy a magazine with an overweight lesbian and a not particularly attractive looking me, on the front. Wankers." Beth Ditto of The Gossip, who had topped the list, agreed, labelling the NME journalists as "chickens" and claiming that they had "totally copped out" on the cover.

In discussion of the 2010 Cool List, music critic Neil McCormick criticised its lack of racial diversity. Writing for The Daily Telegraph, McCormick noted that "according to the NME, there are only seven cool black people in pop culture right now", with popular British rappers such as Tinie Tempah and Dizzee Rascal failing to make the listing. Summing up his opinion, McCormick stated that he found the list "deeply disturbing", and asked: "Did I fight in the punk wars for this?"

== Compilation albums ==
To coincide with the publications of the 2004–05 Cool Lists, NME produced two compilation albums, both of which featured music from artists who had been placed high on the lists. The first album, titled NME: The Cool List, was a limited edition CD covermounted to the 4 December 2004 issue of the magazine, one week after the announcement of that year's list. A 15-track album, it included songs from bands such as Babyshambles, Goldie Lookin Chain, The Futureheads and Bloc Party. The second compilation, NME: The Cool List 2005, was covermounted on the 26 November 2005 issue of NME – the 16-track CD featured songs from The Cribs, Test Icicles and Antony and the Johnsons. Discussing this compilation, senior marketing manager Nick New remarked: "The NME Cool List CD is a great way of NME showcasing what we do best – NME bringing exciting new bands to our readers!"
