= Fantasy Black Channel =

Studio album by Late of the Pier
- Released: 30 July 2008
- Recorded: 2006−2008 at various locations
- Genres: Dance-punk revival; glam rock; progressive rock
- Length: 42:47
- Label: Parlophone
- Producers: Erol Alkan, Sam Eastgate

Singles from Fantasy Black Channel
- 1. "Bathroom Gurgle" Released: 10 September 2007 Re-released: 2 October 2008; 2. "The Bears Are Coming" Released: 2 March 2008; 3. "Space and the Woods" / "Focker" Released: 19 May 2008; 4. "Heartbeat" Released: 4 August 2008

Fantasy Black Channel is the only studio album by British dance-punk revival band Late of the Pier. It was released on 30 July 2008 in Japan through Toshiba EMI and on 4 August 2008 in the British Isles on Parlophone, the band's primary label. Five tracks had already been released as singles in the United Kingdom: "Bathroom Gurgle", "The Bears Are Coming", "Space and the Woods" and "Focker" as a double A-side, and "Heartbeat". The record peaked at number 28 on the UK Albums Chart, but failed to chart in the United States.

The album was recorded in lead vocalist Sam Eastgate's bedroom in Castle Donington, England, and at several locations in London. It went through a fractured creative process that lasted more than two years. It was eventually produced by Eastgate and DJ Erol Alkan between 2007 and 2008. Fantasy Black Channel does not contain a unifying musical or lyrical theme; rather, it is a collage of all the ideas, genres, and studio effects that fascinated the band members and Alkan, especially during live recording sessions. The record was very well received by critics. It was often treated as one of the best British albums of 2008 because of its eclecticism and spirit of invention. Late of the Pier did not record any further albums following the death of drummer Ross Dawson in 2015.

== Origins and recording ==
Having officially formed a band under the name Late of the Pier in 2004, childhood friends Sam Eastgate, Andrew Faley, Sam Potter, and the late Ross Dawson initially developed the sound of their first album by listening to the alternative dance music of British ensemble The Prodigy and the grunge music of American band Nirvana. They soon branched out into listening to diverse genres from the last 40 years of music, including Motown and soul. Potter has treated their conception of Fantasy Black Channel as a reaction to "mediocre, complacent indie-schmindie bands who find a sound and stick to it; whose songs sound exactly the same", while lead writer and composer Eastgate has pointed out that they wanted to "take people past their own limits". The nascent recording stages took place in Eastgate's bedroom, where unconventional time signatures and experimental chords were performed because, at the time, no band member could play an instrument properly.

Late of the Pier started using the album working title Interesting Adventure in 2006 after practising in Eastgate's bedroom for about a year and previewed their new material at the Liars Club in Nottingham. After receiving contract offers from Parlophone and Atlantic Records, the band members signed to Parlophone because the label gave them total autonomy over the recording process without pressuring them to be commercially successful immediately. The record deal was followed by the recording of an EP titled Zarcorp Demo, from which a demo single, "Space and the Woods", was released in March 2007. Eastgate has claimed that the band members were influenced by the music of the 1980s during these formative stages of Fantasy Black Channel even though none of them were born before 1986.

Sam [Eastgate] will ... make a computerised machine track. Then from there we learn what he's put down in a human way ... After that process you get a recording of it like a demo, then from that we'll gig the track and it changes again. Our music goes through lots of filters: it's a really strange process and I don't think many bands do it.

— Sam Potter, on Late of the Pier's methods of creating Fantasy Black Channel

In late 2007, Late of the Pier formally met renowned DJ Erol Alkan after seeing him play a set at the Liars Club. Alkan called them "THE most exciting band around" and offered the band members help in the recording process of Fantasy Black Channel. They accepted and made him producer for the album because of the immediate rapport that developed between the two parties. Dawson has explained the choice of producer by suggesting that Alkan is famous for playing broad genres of music and that he understands the properties and crossover of dance and guitar music. Alkan fully embraced the band members' ideas and immediately understood what they were trying to achieve. "Bathroom Gurgle" was recorded by the new collaboration and was released as a limited edition single in September 2007.

The production process for Fantasy Black Channel gathered pace around December 2007. Late of the Pier usually proceeded by taking bedroom recordings into the studio, where they were refined by Alkan into "a more presentable package". They tried unconventional techniques in the style of avant-garde producer Joe Meek during the live studio recording sessions, including stamping in baths and re-amping guitars through air vents. When tracks were mixed after being recorded, the band members, Alkan, and engineer Jimmy Robertson worked in tandem and unanimously decided when a track had finished undergoing the studio effects process. No songs changed after this point, even when one of the parties had further ideas. At the time, in an interview with the band, Stuart Turnbull of the BBC Collective indicated that Alkan managed to "channel Late of the Pier's sonic attack into something more focused yet still undeniably different".

== Promotion and release ==
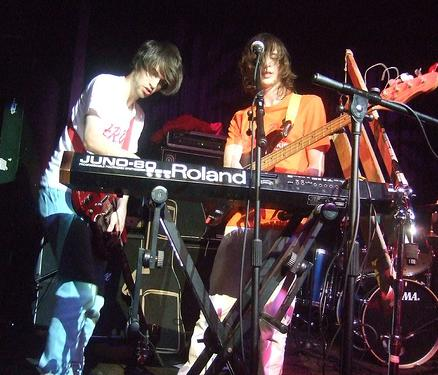
Late of the Pier in concert at the 2007 Dot to Dot Festival in Bristol

The record was nearly completed by end January 2008. Late of the Pier stopped recording to embark on a headlining UK tour during February, in which they previewed new material. "The Bears Are Coming" was released as a vinyl single in March 2008. The band toured until the end of April 2008 to promote another single—a double A-side containing a reworked "Space and the Woods" and "Focker"—from the as-yet-unreleased Fantasy Black Channel. Studio work with Alkan restarted in May 2008 to put the finishing touches on the album; the final version was christened as "a compilation of hits" and "anti-pop pop". The album was recorded during six months in different studios and the band members have admitted that the variety in venues partially explains why it sounds disjointed. The idea of having a single 45-minute track instead of a track list of songs was mooted at the end of May 2008, but was not followed through.

Fantasy Black Channel's track listing and UK CD release date of 11 August 2008 were confirmed on 11 June. Faley has claimed that "the album fell into place itself, like the songs basically told us where they wanted to go on the album". Late of the Pier picked the record's name at random after first contemplating using Peggy Patch and Her Sequenced Dress. The cover art was designed by a friend of the band members from Brighton, Jon Bergman. A final EP containing material already released in 2007 and 2008, Echoclistel Lambietroy, was released in July 2008 as part of the marketing campaign for the forthcoming album. Potter has summed the record's conception by concluding, "I think in the three years to build up to the album, we never actually thought of a track list, and we never really kind of considered the fact that it should sound like an album. I think we recorded all the songs and then they were there and it was like, 'Oh, we have to kind of stitch this together and make it sound like one piece.'"

== Content ==
=== Lyrics ===
The writing process for Fantasy Black Channel was largely unplanned. The verses of "Broken" were conceived late at night and are inspired by insomnia. It took Eastgate a long time to describe how he was feeling "in a way that sounded original" for such a common theme in pop music. The lyrics in the chorus are about the first time Late of the Pier drove to London and got lost. "Space and the Woods" tries to weigh up what is more important: a person or an inanimate object, or an absence of anything, while "The Bears Are Coming" concerns "a silent threat". The idea for the lyric "A heartbeat, a flicker, a line" in "Heartbeat" came to Eastgate while recording the song and hearing its time signature always changing.

The lyricist cannot remember writing "White Snake" and did not know there was a band of the same name in existence. "Focker" evolved out of a demo, called "6/8 Focker", Eastgate sang through a guitar amp with initially indecipherable lyrics. "The Enemy Are the Future" gets its name from a sentence in a promotional leaflet for the indie rock band The Enemy. Eastgate has explained that for "Mad Dogs and Englishmen" he randomly "shouted lots of short phrases" and then tried to make sense of what he said. The process led to stylised lines like "Falling over aeroplanes and wanting to be a derelict".

=== Composition ===
Fantasy Black Channel is largely built on sonic experiments and the use of studio and computer techniques. The opening track, "Hot Tent Blues", is an instrumental short which contains seven layers of electric guitar run through a Zoom 506 bass guitar pedal. "Broken" was conceived during a jam session between Eastgate's guitar riffs and Dawson's drumming, while a demo of "Space and the Woods" similar to the Nirvana song "All Apologies" was reworked and remixed in the studio. Eastgate credits Storm Mortimer, who used to drive Late of the Pier around London, as the muse for "The Bears Are Coming". She often sang impromptu and the frontman eventually borrowed a page of her songs and added an afrobeat-inspired rhythm to it. Eastgate and Dawson wanted to create a track that evoked the idea of "coming out of the jungle" and credit varied musical acts like Slagsmålsklubben, Prince, The Beatles, Mr Flash, FrYars, and Lutricia McNeal as inspiration.

"Heartbeat"
"Heartbeat" is typical of Late of the Pier's unorthodox arrangements and genre fusion. The song is based on an acid house track and features a guitar solo played on the sampler.

"Random Firl" was one of Alkan's favourites and he persuaded Late of the Pier to re-record it like a classical piece of music rather than in a rock-oriented way. The vocal harmonies at the end of the song were added during one of the last days of recording when the pressure to complete the album was high. "Heartbeat" is based on an old acid house demo track that Eastgate created during his childhood using a Roland TB-303 electronic synthesiser-sequencer. The track features complex time signature progressions and a guitar solo played by Potter on the sampler at the end. "Whitesnake" was inspired by the music of Devo, Roxy Music, and Dandi Wind, while "VW" is based on a 2001 demo recorded in Eastgate's attic. In the studio, Late of the Pier hired brass players to perform the horn sections and create new scales. Once the instrumentals were recorded, the band members purposefully decided to mix their own playing lower in certain sections of the song so listeners could hear the horns more clearly.

"Focker" was created using a looped riff from "6/8 Focker". Eastgate then conceived a drum solo and remixed and rearranged the last twenty seconds of the song. "The Enemy Are the Future" was created during a hungover jam session, where all band members played individually and not in tandem. Dawson performed around 40 different beats one after another all in different timings. The session was recorded using a tape player and a track was moulded in the studio. Four different endings were recorded and three were spliced together at the end. "Mad Dogs and Englishmen", whose riff is based on an old French samba song, was borne out of an interplay between Eastgate on the guitar and Faley on the bass. The last track on the album, "Bathroom Gurgle", includes "a squelchy grind of the riff" purpose-built for the Liars Club audience during the band's first ever gigs. Eastgate has explained, "I had these two themes, which looped round on each other which I sang very exasperated Annie Lennox style vocals over." The fast tempo of the first half of the song was juxtaposed against a section of "slow drama".

== Critical reception ==
Professional ratings
Aggregate scores
Source	Rating
Metacritic	81/100
Review scores
Source	Rating
AllMusic	4/5 stars
Alternative Press	4/5
Blender	3.5/5 stars
The Guardian	5/5 stars
The Irish Times	3/5 stars
NME	4/5 stars
Pitchfork	6.7/10
PopMatters	8/10
Spin	3/5 stars
Uncut	4/5 stars

Media response to Fantasy Black Channel was highly favourable; aggregating website Metacritic reports a normalised rating of 81% based on 18 critical reviews. AllMusic's K. Ross Hoffman described the album as "glorious and galvanising" and labelled it "a convoluted construction crammed with so many immediately gratifying moments that it takes multiple listens to extricate them all". John Burgess of The Guardian explained that a new favourite song, riff, or wayward moment can be found every time the album is listened to. Tim Chester of NME concluded, "It takes a certain kind of mind to make this. While others whinge about living and dying in cul-de-sac towns shackled by cul-de-sac imaginations, LOTP's vision is housed on Dubai's 'The World' island-creation project."

Some reviewers classified Fantasy Black Channel into the British new rave genre and musical scene. Others claimed that they could hear impressions of Roxy Music frontman Bryan Ferry and musician Gary Numan in the recording. Pitchfork's Adam Moerder commented that it contains several new rave compositions which are aesthetically dubious. Chris Baynes of PopMatters claimed that the band members "wear their influences pretty much inked onto their sleeves", but concluded that the album is exciting and excitable in equal measure. According to Late of the Pier, comparisons to Klaxons and new rave are the results of lazy journalism, especially for a scene the band has never been in. Eastgate has explained that musical influences are often subconscious, even though the band members tried not to listen to anything but their own work while recording the album. Nick Mitchell of The Skinny pointed out that the record is "an unrestrained, unclassifiable, unexpectedly triumphant romp through blaring influences and genres, from the 70s camp rock of Queen and Bowie to the primitive electronics of Gary Numan, with echoes of 90s computer games and snatches of modern house".

Fantasy Black Channel figured in several publications' end-of-year best album lists for 2008, notably, at number three by Clash, at number five by FACT, and at number 18 by NME. It was ranked at number 16 in HMV's Poll of Polls for 2008, which aggregates the votes of prominent British critics to decide the commercial group's Album Of The Year. Earlier in 2008, Rory Carroll of Artrocker claimed that the record would have been a late entrant for the Mercury Music Prize, and would have probably won the award, if nominations had been made in August rather than July 2008. Because of their work on the album, Late of the Pier received a nomination for Best New Band at the 2009 NME Awards. Two tracks were also nominated: "Bathroom Gurgle" and "Heartbeat", in the Best Dancefloor Filler and Best Video categories respectively. In 2009, Clash placed Fantasy Black Channel at number 40 in its list of the 50 Greatest Albums, 2004–2009, while FACT included it at number 99 in its editorial staff list of the 100 Best: Albums of the Decade.

== Track listing ==
All songs written and arranged by Sam Eastgate, unless otherwise stated.

No.	Title	Length
1.	"Hot Tent Blues"	1:16
2.	"Broken"	4:11
3.	"Space and the Woods"	3:44
4.	"The Bears Are Coming" (Sam Eastgate, Storm Mortimer)	3:23
5.	"Random Firl" (Sam Eastgate, Andrew Faley)	2:14
6.	"Heartbeat"	3:02
7.	"Whitesnake"	3:01
8.	"VW" (Sam Eastgate, Richard Eastgate)	2:27
9.	"Focker"	3:14
10.	"The Enemy Are the Future" (Sam Eastgate, Andrew Faley, Sam Potter, Ross Dawson)	6:01
11.	"Mad Dogs and Englishmen"	3:00
12.	"Bathroom Gurgle" (Sam Eastgate, Andrew Faley, Sam Potter, Ross Dawson)	7:14

- A hidden track, "No Time", begins at 4:50 of "Bathroom Gurgle".

=== Bonus tracks ===
- "Dose A" – 1:47 – track 13 on the iTunes version
- "Very Wav" – 4:44 – track 13 on the Japanese and U.S. editions
- “Animal in an Air Raid Shelter” – 1:36 – track 13 on the Italian edition
- "Focker (Rolmops Remix)" – 3:15 – track 14 on the Japanese edition
- "The Bears Are Coming (Emperor Machine Remix)" – 9:22 – track 14 on U.S. edition and track 15 on the Japanese edition

=== Vinyl ===
The 2008 UK LP version of Fantasy Black Channel comprised a standard black vinyl copy in a gatefold picture sleeve. It was released a week earlier than the CD version and had the following track changes:

- "Space and the Woods (Cenzo Townshend Mix)" instead of "Space and the Woods"
- "The Bears Are Coming (Original Version)" instead of "The Bears Are Coming"
- "Heartbeat (Cenzo Townsend Version)" instead of "Heartbeat"

The 2009 U.S. LP version was released concurrently with the CD version.

== Personnel ==
Band

- Sam Eastgate – lead vocals, electric guitar, acoustic guitar, drum sequencing, synthesiser
- Andrew Faley – bass guitar, backing vocals, bass synthesiser
- Sam Potter – sampler, synthesiser, backing vocals
- Ross Dawson – drums

Additional musicians

- Giselle Kennedy – backing vocals (track 2)
- Erol Alkan – backing vocals (track 5)
- Nik Carter – tenor vocals, baritone vocals (track 8)
- Jack Birchwood – trumpet, flugelhorn (track 8)

Production

- Erol Alkan – producer; mixing (except tracks 1, 2, 3)
- Sam Eastgate – producer (tracks 1, 2, 4, 9, 12); arrangements
- Jimmy Robertson – engineering; mixing (except tracks 1, 2, 3)
- Mark Alloway – assistant engineer (tracks 1, 2, 3, 7, 9, 10, 11)
- Al Lawson – assistant engineer (track 1)
- Ben Jackson – assistant engineer (track 7)
- Oli Wright – assistant engineer (track 12)
- Cenzo Townshend – mixing (tracks 1, 2, 3)
- Neil Comber – assistant mixer (track 1, 2, 3)
- Darren Simpson – assistant mixer (track 4)
- Daniel Rejmer – assistant mixer (tracks 5, 11)
- Lee Slaney – assistant mixer (tracks 6, 7, 8, 9, 10, 12)
- Mike Marsh – mastering (except track 4)
- Nilesh Patel – mastering (track 4)

Artwork

- Jon Bergman – cover art
- Late of the Pier – design
- Traffic – design

== Recording and release details ==
Fantasy Black Channel was recorded between 2006 and 2008 in Sam Eastgate's bedroom in Castle Donington and at the following studios in London.

Track	Location
"Hot Tent Blues"	Sam Eastgate's bedroom; Sofa Sound
"Broken"	Sam Eastgate's bedroom; Sofa Sound
"Space and the Woods"	The Miloco Garden
"The Bears Are Coming"	Sam Eastgate's bedroom; The Miloco Garden
"Random Firl"	Sofa Sound
"Heartbeat"	Sofa Sound
"White Snake"	The Miloco Garden; EMI Publishing Studios
"VW"	The Miloco Garden
"Focker"	Sam Eastgate's bedroom; The Miloco Garden
"The Enemy Are the Future"	The Garden
"Mad Dogs and Englishmen"	The Miloco Garden
"Bathroom Gurgle"	Sam Eastgate's bedroom; The Miloco Garden; Miloco Hoxton Square; Strongroom; Miloco Musikbox

The album's release history is as follows:

Region	Date	Label	Format(s)	Catalog
Japan	30 July 2008	Toshiba EMI	CD	TOCP-66797
United Kingdom and Ireland	4 August 2008	Parlophone	LP	228 0331
United Kingdom and Ireland	11 August 2008	Parlophone	CD, digital download	228 0342
France	4 September 2008	Because Music	CD	BEC 5772361
United States	13 January 2009	Astralwerks	LP	ASW 28033
United States	13 January 2009	Astralwerks	CD, digital download	ASW 37034

== Chart positions ==
Album

Chart (2008)	Peak
UK Albums Chart	28
Belgian Albums Chart (Flanders)	68
Belgian Alternative Albums	30

Singles

Song	Peak
Song	UK
"Bathroom Gurgle"	—
"The Bears Are Coming"	—
"Space and the Woods" / "Focker"	—
"Heartbeat"	98
"Bathroom Gurgle" (re-release)	—

"—" denotes releases that did not chart.
