= Guilt (The Long Blondes song) =

Single by The Long Blondes

from the album "Couples"
- Released: (United Kingdom) 30 June 2008
- Recorded: August 2007–December 2007
- Genre: Indie rock
- Label: Rough Trade
- Songwriter: Dorian Cox
- Producer: Erol Alkan

The Long Blondes singles chronology
"Century" (2008)	"Guilt" (2008)

"Guilt" is the second and last single to be taken from The Long Blondes' second album "Couples". It was released on 30 July 2008 as a limited edition 2-track 7" vinyl only.

The video for Guilt is set in a dog show. The band agreed to their suggestion to set the video in a dog show after receiving numerous literal interpretations of the lyrics. It was accompanied by one b-side called "Melville Farr" which is based on Dirk Bogarde's character in the 1961 British film Victim.

"Guilt" was well received by critics and fans alike, with some critics calling it their most accomplished effort to date. The single reached number 24 in the UK Indie Chart. The song did really well considering the lack of promotion, airplay and Dorian Cox being ill at the time of release.

"Good as Gold" is the only song by The Long Blondes not to be sung by Kate Jackson. It is sung by bassist Reenie Hollis.

== Track listing ==
All lyrics written by Dorian Cox, music by The Long Blondes.

- 7"
1. Side A "Guilt (Dan Carey Mix)"
2. Side B "Melville Farr"
- Digital download
1. "Guilt (Dan Carey Mix)"
2. "Melville Farr"
3. "Good as Gold"
4. "Too Happy"
