= Too Clever by Half =

Too Clever by Half may refer to:

- Too clever by half, an idiom
- Too Clever by Half, 1853 novel by Australian writer John Lang
- Too Clever by Half, a song from the album, Couples
- Too Clever by Half, an alternative name for Aleksandr Ostrovsky's 1868 play, Enough Stupidity in Every Wise Man
- Too Clever by Half, a documentary by Colette Hiller
