= NME: The Cool List 2005 =

Compilation album by Various artists
- Released: 26 November 2005
- Genre: Rock, indie
- Length: 56:39
- Label: New Musical Express

Various artists chronology
NME: The Cool List (2004)	NME: The Cool List 2005 (2005)

NME: The Cool List 2005 is a compilation album released by British music magazine NME to correspond with their 2005 Cool List. It was covermounted on the 26 November 2005 issue of the magazine, and includes tracks from several of the artists who were featured in the list. Discussing the album, senior marketing manager Nick New remarked: "The NME Cool List CD is a great way of NME showcasing what we do best – NME bringing exciting new bands to our readers!"

== Track listing ==
No.	Title	Artist	Length
1.	"The Great Escape"	We Are Scientists	3:21
2.	"Lust in the Movies"	The Long Blondes	3:02
3.	"We Can No Longer Cheat You"	The Cribs	3:04
4.	"You Can't Fool Me Dennis"	Mystery Jets	3:39
5.	"Maintain the Focus"	Test Icicles	3:37
6.	"Panic Attack"	The Paddingtons	3:33
7.	"Frankenstein"	Antony and the Johnsons	5:08
8.	"Ladyflash"	The Go! Team	4:16
9.	"I Don't Know Why"	Kano	3:58
10.	"Thirteen"	¡Forward, Russia!	4:02
11.	"Future"	Cut Copy	5:13
12.	"Bunk Trunk Skunk"	Be Your Own Pet	1:33
13.	"Mince Meat"	DANGERDOOM	2:36
14.	"I Could Have You"	Dan Sartain	2:33
15.	"Over and Over Again (Lost and Found)"	Clap Your Hands Say Yeah	3:10
16.	"Lucky 6"	Lupen Crook	3:54
Total length:			56:39
