= Once and Never Again =

"Once And Never Again"

Single by The Long Blondes

from the album Someone to Drive You Home
- Released: 23 October 2006
- Recorded: 2006
- Genre: Indie rock
- Label: Rough Trade Records
- Producer(s): Steve Mackey

The Long Blondes singles chronology
"Weekend Without Makeup" (2006)	"Once And Never Again" (2006)	"Giddy Stratospheres" (2007)

"Once And Never Again" is the second major label single from UK indie rock band The Long Blondes. It was released in October 2006, shortly before their debut album Someone to Drive You Home.

The song is listed at #390 on Pitchfork Media's top 500 songs of the 2000s.

The cover is a painting of Gene Pitney & Dusty Springfield.

== Track listing ==
#	Title	Length
CD single
1.	"Once And Never Again"	3:08
2.	"Five Ways To End It"	6:06
3.	"Once And Never Again" (Video)	2:59
7" 1
1a.	"Once And Never Again"	3:08
1b.	"The Whippet Fancier"	3:48
7" 2
1a.	"Once And Never Again"	3:08
1b.	"Who Are You To Her?"	4:29
