= The Thirst (band) =

English indie rock band

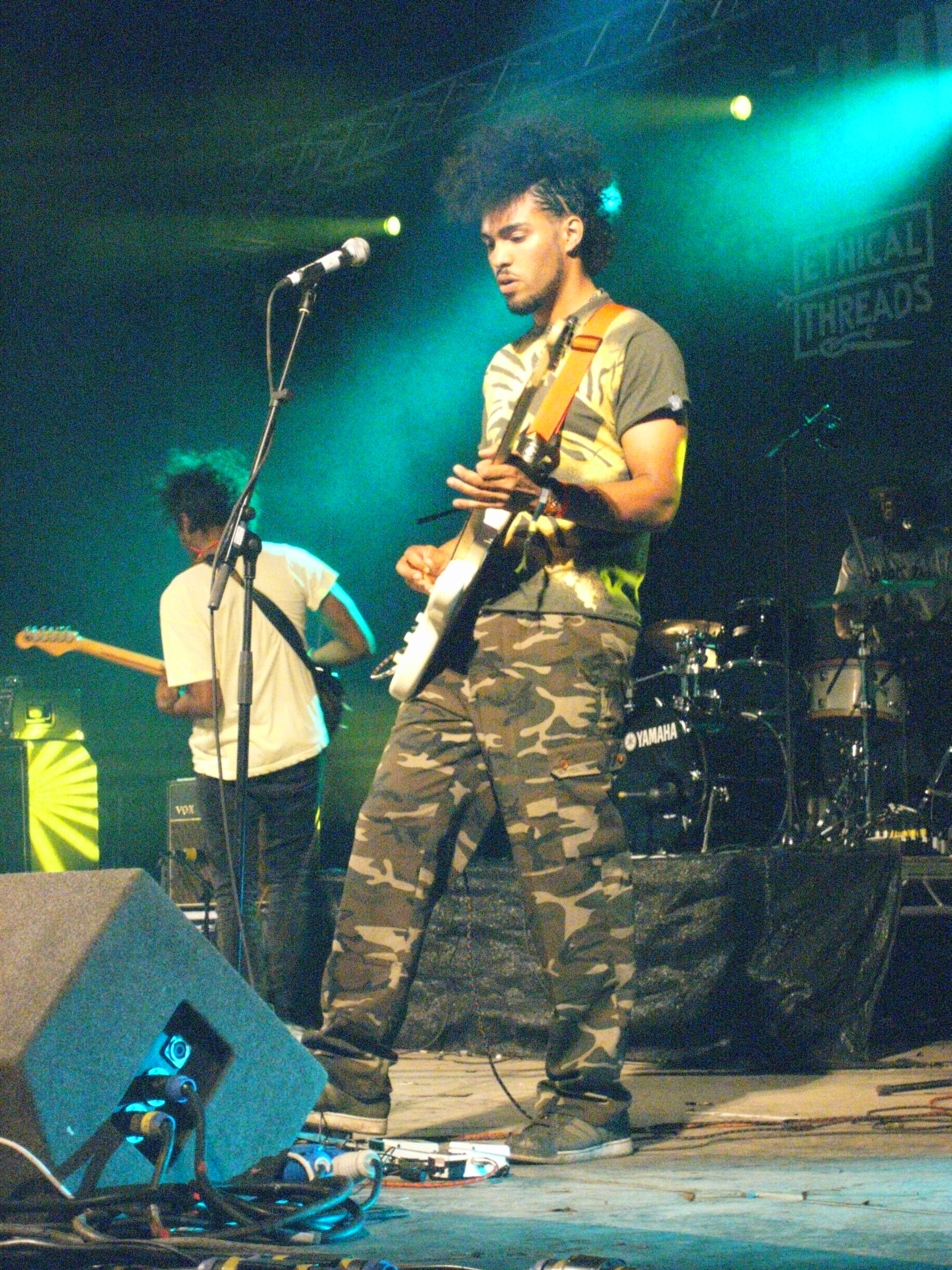

Background information
- Origin: Brixton, London, England
- Genre: Indie rock
- Years active: 2005–2016
- Labels: Wooden Records; Unsigned
- Members: Mensah Hart; Kwame Hart; Mark Lenihan; Marcus Harris
- Website: Official Website

The Thirst (now known as The Baytrees) are an English indie rock band based in Brixton, London. The band consists of brothers Mensah (vocals/guitar) and Kwame Hart (bass), Mark Lenihan (guitar) and Marcus Harris (drums/backing vocals).

== History ==
Mensah received an electric guitar from his parents around the age of 14, and after a few years he decided to get his brother, Kwame, a bass guitar. This inspired friends Mark and Marcus to complete the band by purchasing a second guitar and drum kit respectively. The main inspiration behind starting the band was their strong musical upbringing and appreciation and their musical influences include Jimi Hendrix, punk, drum n bass, and local hip-hop.

The Thirst's first performance consisted of hastily created songs to fill their two forty-five-minute acoustic sets. From there The Thirst continued to constantly gig all around London, which created a strong fanbase and more public awareness. Fortunately they were spotted at The Jamm in October 2006, which led to their recording contract with Ronnie Wood's new record label, Wooden Records.

They have performed at a number of festivals, including Isle of Wight Festival 2007, Hyde Park Calling, Electric Gardens, the Dorking Rock Festival, and Glastonbury, as well as exclusive support performances with The Rolling Stones in Montenegro July 2007, and two one-night support acts for The Sex Pistols November 2007.

The Thirst released The Thirst EP in 2007 and their debut album, On the Brink, in 2008, to a generally positive critical reaction. In March 2008, they played at the SXSW festival in Texas, and were picked out by Tom Robinson as the highlight of the festival. They later performed a live session on Marc Riley's BBC 6 Music show Brain Surgery.

After performing at The Oak in Burntwood, Staffordshire on 21 November 2009, The Thirst, their manager and their sound engineer were arrested by armed police. Half a day later, all parties were released without charge and were notified that CCTV operators had flagged them under suspicion of firearms possession. Several months after the incident, the Staffordshire police finally agreed to destroy the DNA evidence acquired in the undeserved confinement of The Thirst and crew.

At the start of 2010, The Thirst were invited to compete in a songwriting competition as representatives of England at the Festival Internacional de la Canción de Viña del Mar, in Viña del Mar, Chile. They are to perform a cover of "Satisfaction" by The Rolling Stones in the competition and perform their own songs during the Festival between 22 and 27 February 2010.

== Discography ==
Albums

- On the Brink (26 May 2008)

EPs

- The Thirst EP (23 July 2007)
- Laugh with the Sinners EP (Dec 2011)
- Cry with the Saints EP (TBD)

Singles

- "Ready to Move" (29 October 2007)
- "Sail Away" (28 April 2008)
