= Erol Alkan =

English DJ and producer (born 1974)

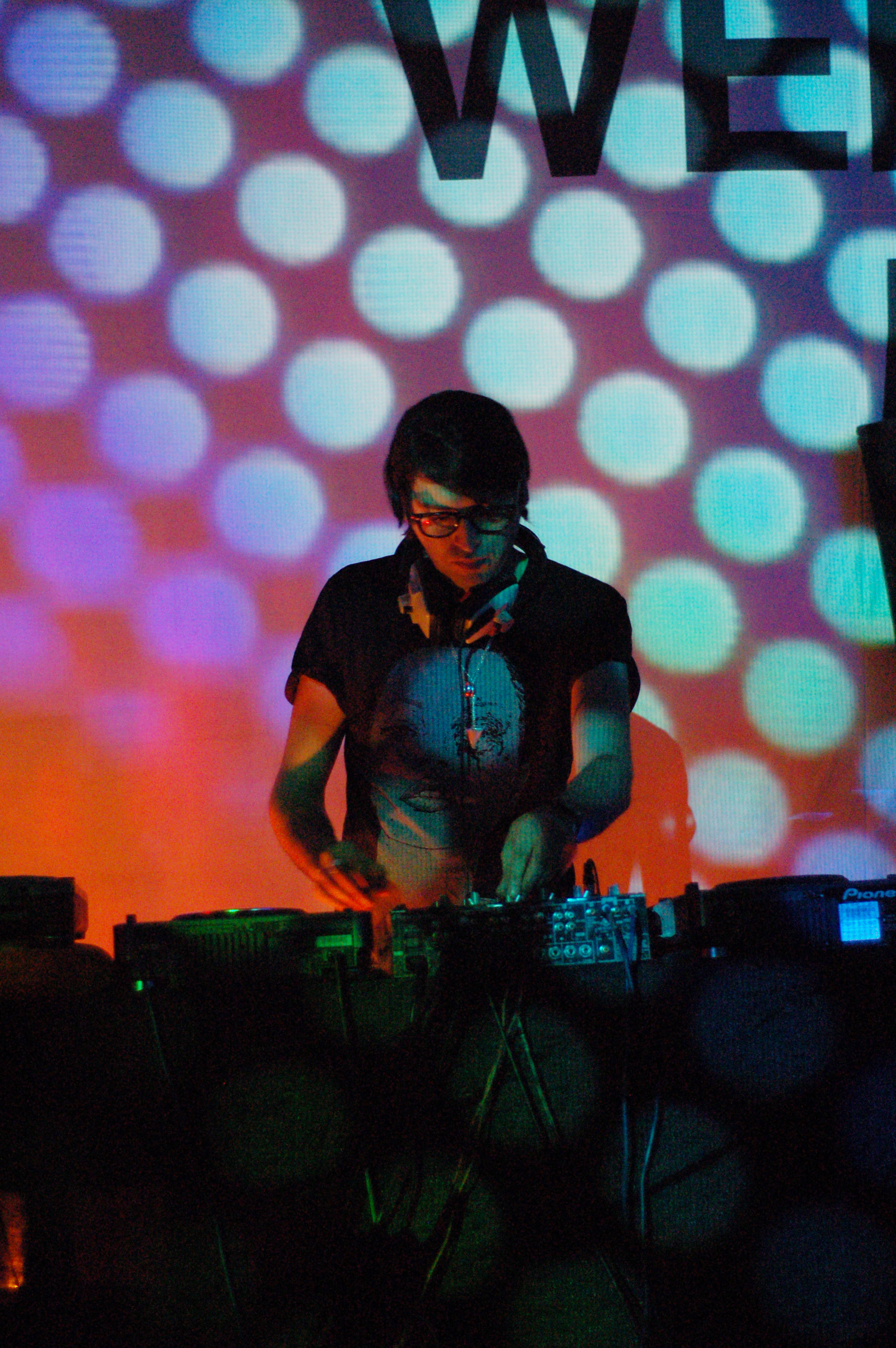
- Alkan performing in 2008

Background information
- Also known as: Kurtis Rush; Mustapha 3000; Beyond The Wizards Sleeve; Disco 3000
- Born: May 30, 1974 (age 52); London, England
- Genres: Alternative rock, electronic
- Occupations: DJ, producer, musician, artist
- Instruments: Turntables, synthesiser, sequencer, guitar, bass, drums, voice, CDJ-2000
- Years active: 1993–present
- Label: Phantasy
- Website: erolalkan.co.uk

Erol Alkan (born 30 May 1974) is an English DJ and producer of Turkish Cypriot descent. He grew up in Archway in North London.

== Career ==
=== DJ and club promoter ===
In 1993, Alkan started DJing in various indie nightclubs in London. His first ever public DJ set was at The Gass Club in Leicester Square.

In 1995, he was a resident DJ of club night 'Going Underground'.

In 1997, Erol re-launched the club under a new name: Trash. Over the next few years, Trash became one of the most influential clubs of its time. Until its closure in 2007, Trash saw performances by Peaches, LCD Soundsystem, Klaxons, Bloc Party, 2manydjs, Yeah Yeah Yeahs, Scissor Sisters, Phoenix, Metronomy, Electric Six and many more up and coming bands.

From 2001 onwards, Erol Alkan became one of the most in demand Djs of the time, playing regular DJ sets outside Trash, focusing primarily on dance music influenced by his sets at Bugged Out. Bugged Out are credited as launching Erol's dance music career after offering him a residency halfway through his debut set for them at Fabric, when Erol filled in for David Holmes who had missed a flight into London. His profile increased considerably during 2003 when he was voted 'Best Breakthrough DJ' by Muzik magazine, and in 2006, when he earned the Mixmag 2006 "DJ of the Year" award.

In 2026, he wrote a book about Trash, published by Faber & Faber.

=== Remixer ===
Erol Alkan released a series of mash-ups using the alias Kurtis Rush in the early 2000s, including a mix of Kylie Minogue's "Can't Get You Out of My Head" and New Order's "Blue Monday", which was performed by Minogue at the Brit Awards. Erol also used the alias Mustapha 3000, and is half of the psychedelic dance-rock act Beyond the Wizard's Sleeve, along with Richard Norris. In 2016, Beyond The Wizard's Sleeve released the album The Soft Bounce, featuring collaborations with artists such as Hannah Peel, Jane Weaver, Euros Childs and writer Jon Savage. In 2016, London record store Rough Trade featured The Soft Bounce as one of their top ten records of 2016 in their annual end of year list.

=== Producer ===
Erol Alkan began producing bands in 2006. Initially he recorded B-sides for The Long Blondes and Mystery Jets, and then worked on their respective second albums. His first production credit is the entire Mystery Jets' second album, Twenty One, which contained the 2 top 40 hit singles "Young Love" and "Two Doors Down", Late of the Pier's debut record, Fantasy Black Channel, and The Long Blondes' second album Couples.

In 2007 Alkan founded his own label, named Phantasy.

Alkan also worked as additional producer on The Killers' hit single "The Man", providing additional instrumentation.

== Discography ==
=== Original releases ===
Year	Title
2009	"Waves / Death Suite" (with Boys Noize)
2009	"Waves" (Chilly Gonzales Piano Rework)
2010	"Lemonade / Avalanche" (with Boys Noize)
2011	"Avalanche (Terminal Velocity)" (with Boys Noize feat. Jarvis Cocker)
2012	"Roland Rat / Brainstorm" (with Boys Noize)
2012	"A Sydney Jook" (with Switch)
2013	"Illumination" EP
2015	"Sub Conscious"
2018	"Spectrum / Silver Echoes"

=== Mix and compilation albums ===
Year	Title
2001	Trash Companion #1
2003	One Louder (Muzik Magazine Covermount)
2004	A Bugged Out Mix
2006	Disco 2006 (Mixmag Magazine Covermount)
2008	Ark 1 (As Beyond The Wizard's Sleeve)
2009	Re-Animations Volume 1 (As Beyond The Wizard's Sleeve)
2012	Another "Bugged Out" Mix & "Bugged In" Selection
2014	FabricLive.77

=== Remixes as Erol Alkan ===
Year	Artist	Track	Title
2004	Mylo	"Drop the Pressure"	Erol Alkan's Extended Re-Edit
2004	Alter Ego	"Rocker"	Erol Alkan's Death Disco Re-Vised
2004	Death from Above 1979	"Romantic Rights"	Erol Alkan's Love From Below Re-Edit
2005	The Chemical Brothers	"Believe"	Erol Alkan's Feel Me Rework
2005	Bloc Party	"She's Hearing Voices"	Erol Alkan's Calling Your Name Dub & Vocal Re-Works
2005	Mystery Jets	"Zoo Time"	Erol Alkan Re-Work
2005	Franz Ferdinand	"Do You Want To"	Erol Alkan's Glam Racket
2006	Daft Punk	"The Brainwasher"	Erol Alkan's Horrorhouse Dub
2006	Justice	"Waters of Nazareth"	Erol Alkan's Durrr Durrr Durrrrrr Re-Edit
2006	Hot Chip	"Boy From School"	Erol Alkan's Extended Rework
2006	Scissor Sisters	"I Don't Feel Like Dancin'"	Erol Alkan's Carnival Of Light Rework
2007	Klaxons	"Golden Skans"	Erol Alkan's Ekstra Spektral Rework
2007	Digitalism	"Jupiter Room"	Erol Alkan's Simple, Yet Effective Re-Edit
2007	Interpol	"Mammoth"	Erol Alkan Rework
2007	La Priest	"Engine"	Erol Alkan's Transonic Re-Edit
2008	Fan Death	"Veronica's Veil"	Erol Alkan's Extended Rework
2008	Sebastian	"Momy"	Erol Alkan's Murrr/O/Durrr Re-Edit
2008	ZZT	"The Worm"	Erol Alkan's Extended Rework
2009	Yeah Yeah Yeahs	"Zero"	Erol Alkan Rework
2010	Chilly Gonzales	"Never Stop"	Erol Alkan's Piano Pella
2010	Chilly Gonzales	"Never Stop"	Erol Alkan Rework
2010	MGMT	"Congratulations"	Erol Alkan Rework
2010	Eurythmics	"Sweet Dreams"	Erol Alkan Re-Edit #1
2011	Tame Impala	"Why Won't You Make Up Your Mind?"	Erol Alkan Rework
2011	Erol Alkan & Boys Noize	"Death Suite"	Erol Alkan Edit
2011	Connan Mockasin	"Forever Dolphin Love"	Erol Alkan Rework
2011	Metronomy	"The Bay"	Erol Alkan's Extended Rework
2011	Ladytron	"Flicking Your Switch"	Erol Alkan Remix
2012	Justice	"Canon"	Erol Alkan's Extended Rework
2012	Saint Etienne	"Last Days of Disco"	Erol Alkan's Extended Rework
2012	Kindness	"Gee Up"	Erol Alkan's Extended Rework
2012	Connan Mockasin	"Forever Dolphin Love"	Erol Alkan's Extended Rework Version 2
2012	Spandex	"The Bull"	Erol Alkan Rework
2013	Night Works	"Long Forgotten Boy"	Erol Alkan's Extended Rework
2013	Tame Impala	"Be Above It"	Erol Alkan Rework
2014	Manic Street Preachers	"Europa Geht Durch Mich"	Erol Alkan's Mesmerise Eins/Zwei Rework
2014	The Emperor Machine	"RMI Is All I Want"	Erol Alkan's Extended Rework
2014	Klaxons	"Love Frequency"	Erol Alkan's Mild Pitch Remix
2014	Margot	"Waldorf"	Erol Alkan Rework
2015	Emil Nikolaisen, Hans-Peter Lindstrøm, and Todd Rundgren	"Runddans"	Erol Alkan Rework
2015	New Order	"Singularity"	Erol Alkan Rework
2016	Beyond The Wizards Sleeve	"White Crow"	Erol Alkan Rework
2017	Todd Terje & Det Glyne Triangel	"Maskindanse"	Erol Alkan Rework
2017	Depeche Mode	"Cover Me"	Erol Alkan White Light Rework
2017	Depeche Mode	"Cover Me"	Erol Alkan Black Out Rework
2018	Tuff City Kids ft Joe Goddard	"Reach Out"	Erol Alkan Rework

=== Remixes as Beyond the Wizards Sleeve ===
Year	Artist	Title
2006	Peter Bjorn and John	"Young Folks"
2006	Dust Galaxy	"Come Hear the Trumpets"
2006	Midlake	"Roscoe"
2007	Findlay Brown	"Losing the Will to Survive"
2007	Tracey Thorn	"Raise the Roof"
2007	Badly Drawn Boy	"Promises"
2007	The Chemical Brothers	"Battle Scars"
2008	The Real Ones	"Outlaw"
2008	Late of the Pier	"The Bears Are Coming"
2008	Goldfrapp	"Happiness"
2008	Simian Mobile Disco	"Love"
2009	Franz Ferdinand	"Ulysses"
2010	De De Mouse	"Station to Stars"
2014	Temples	"Sun Structures"
2014	Daniel Avery	"New Energy"
2015	Noel Gallagher	"Ballad of the Mighty I"
2015	Noel Gallagher	"Riverman"
2016	Shock Machine	"The Shock Machine"
2016	M Craft	"Chemical Trails"
2016	Doom Squad	"Pyramids"

=== Producer / mixer ===
Year	Artist	Title
2006	The Long Blondes	"Weekend Without Makeup" (B-sides)
2006	Mystery Jets	"Diamonds in the Dark" EP
2006	The Long Blondes	"Once and Never Again" (B-sides)
2006	Mystery Jets	"Half in Love with the Radio" b/w "Umbrellahead"
2007	The Long Blondes	"Giddy Stratospheres" (B-sides)
2007	Klaxons	"Electrickery"
2007	Mystery Jets	"Zootime" (American LP)
2007	Franz Ferdinand	"All My Friends" (LCD Soundsystem cover)
2007	Klaxons	"The Night"
2007	Late of the Pier	"Bathroom Gurgle"
2008	Late of the Pier	"The Bears Are Coming"
2008	Mystery Jets	"Twenty One"
2008	The Long Blondes	"Century"
2008	The Long Blondes	"Couples"
2008	Late of the Pier	"Space and the Woods" b/w "Focker"
2008	Mystery Jets	"Two Doors Down"
2008	Late of the Pier	"Heartbeat"
2008	Late of the Pier	"Fantasy Black Channel"
2008	Whitey	"Do the Nothing"
2009	Late of the Pier	"Blueberry"
2010	Late of the Pier	"Best in the Class"
2010	Late of the Pier	"Best in the Class" (Remixes EP)
2011	Kindness	"Cyan"
2012	Daniel Avery	"Need Electric" EP
2012	Daniel Avery	"Water Jump" EP
2013	Daniel Avery	"Drone Logic"
2014	Ghost Culture	"Ghost Culture"
2016	Beyond The Wizards Sleeve	"The Soft Bounce"
2017	Ride	"Weather Diaries"
2017	The Killers	"The Man"
2018	Teeth Of The Sea	"I'd Rather, Jack"
2018	Daniel Avery	"Song For Alpha"
2018	Gabe Gurnsey	"Physical"
2019	Ride	"This Is Not a Safe Place"
2021	Duran Duran	"Future Past"

== Personal life ==
Alkan lives in London, and has been teetotal since 2012.

== Audio links ==
- Erol Alkan on Souncloud

Awards and achievements
Preceded by Paul van Dyk	Mixmag Number 1 DJ; 2006	Succeeded by Armin van Buuren
