= Space and the Woods =

Single by Late of the Pier

from the album Fantasy Black Channel
- Released: 5 March 2007 (UK); 19 May 2008 (UK) (re-release)
- Genre: Dance-punk; electroclash; glam punk; new rave
- Length: 3:58
- Label: WayOutWest
- Songwriter: Sam Eastgate

Late of the Pier singles chronology
"Space and the Woods" (2007)	"Bathroom Gurgle" (2007)

Music video
- "Space and the Woods" on YouTube

"Space and the Woods" is a song released by UK band Late of the Pier on 5 March 2007. It was released on 500 limited edition 7" records.

The single and b-side are different recordings to those that appeared on the Zarcorp Demo. Notably, "Heartbeat, Flicker, Line" was given a definite name, previously known to fans as "7Beat" or "Heartbeat". The b-side was later re-recorded and became the lead single for their debut album, Fantasy Black Channel.

The song was remixed by Brighton-based DJ, South Central, and released on a limited edition white label 12".

It was re-recorded and re-released on 19 May 2008 as a double A-side with "Focker", on 12", 7" and download.

The song was used in 2009 by Sony in their promotional videos for the PSP Go.

It was covered by Marina and the Diamonds as a B-side to her 2009 single "Mowgli's Road".

== Track listing ==
- 7"
  1. "Space and the Woods"
  2. "Heartbeat, Flicker, Line"
- 12"
  1. "Space and the Woods" (South Central bootleg mix)

=== Re-release ===
- 7"
  1. "Space and the Woods (Cenzo Townshend Mix)"
  2. "Focker"
- 12"
  1. "Space And The Woods (Erol Alkan Mix)"
  2. "Space And The Woods (Switch Remix)"
  3. "Focker"
  4. "Focker (Rolmops Remix)"
- CD single
  1. "Space and the Woods (Cenzo Townshend Mix)"
  2. "Focker"
  3. "The Bears Are Coming (Metronomy Remix)"
