= Trash (nightclub) =

Nightclub in London, England

Coordinates: 51.5167°N 0.1254°W

Trash was a popular London indie and electro nightclub run by Erol Alkan between 1997 and 2007. It first existed at the original Plastic People in Soho, then at neighbouring venue The Annexe on Dean Street, before finally finding a home at The End off New Oxford Street in the West End of London.

It was influential in terms of pioneering and popularising new genres of music, such as the garage rock revival and electroclash, with early performances from bands such as the Yeah Yeah Yeahs, LCD Soundsystem, Bloc Party, and Klaxons.

== DJs ==
In its formative years at Plastic People and The Annexe, Trash's DJs were Erol Alkan and James. When the club moved and expanded to The End they were initially joined by Rory Phillips and in the years that followed, Mavs and The Lovely Jonjo.

== Songs ==
For the latter 5 years of the club, the last two tracks played were always the same. "There Is a Light That Never Goes Out" by The Smiths and then "Rock 'n' Roll Suicide" by David Bowie. Erol Alkan believed "they are the two songs that best reflect club culture, its people and places, highs and lows and bring people together".

The last ever track played was "Dancing Queen" by ABBA.
