= Weekend Without Makeup =

Single by The Long Blondes

from the album Someone to Drive You Home
- Released: 26 June 2006
- Genre: Indie rock
- Label: Rough Trade
- Songwriter(s): Dorian Cox; Kate Jackson
- Producer(s): Steve Mackey; Erol Alkan

The Long Blondes singles chronology
"Separated By Motorways" (2005)	"Weekend Without Makeup" (2006)	"Giddy Stratospheres" (2007)

"Weekend Without Makeup" was the first single to be taken from the Long Blondes' first album Someone to Drive You Home. It was released on 26 July 2006 on CD, double 7-inch single and digital download. The single reached number 28 in the UK Singles Chart.

== Paintings ==
- The two front covers of Weekend Without Make-Up are paintings of Diana Dors.

== Track listing ==
All lyrics written by Dorian Cox|Kate Jackson, music by The Long Blondes.

- CD
1. Side A "Weekend Without Makeup"
2. Side B "Fulwood Babylon"
- 7-inch 1
1. Side A "Weekend Without Makeup"
2. Side B "Platitudes"
- 7-inch 2
1. Side A "Weekend Without Makeup"
2. Side B "Last Night on Northgate Street"
- Digital download
1. 1. "Weekend Without Makeup"
2. 2. "Fulwood Babylon"
3. 3. "Platitudes"
4. 4. "Last Night on Northgate Street"
