= Veto Silver =

Veto Silver was a synthpop band from the United Kingdom. It was made up of Ben Silver (vocals), Neal Silver (guitars), and Patrick Silver (synthesizers and samplers). The band officially called it quits, however, on 6 March 2007, deciding to have their final gig the following day. It is still not clear as to why the split occurred since that information has not been publicly announced yet.

Veto Silver has been on tour in the UK with rock band Protokoll.

The group's first EP, "When You're With That Girl", came out in 2005 as a limited release. Veto Silver released an EP entitled "Stay Young, Stay Beautiful" on 12 June 2006. After "Stay Young, Stay Beautiful," Veto Silver's next single was "Love The Way You Love".

The band had a few lineup changes since its birth with singer Ben 'Silver' being the main member of the band. Members of Veto Silver take the surname 'Silver' as their published surname.
