= Lupen Crook =

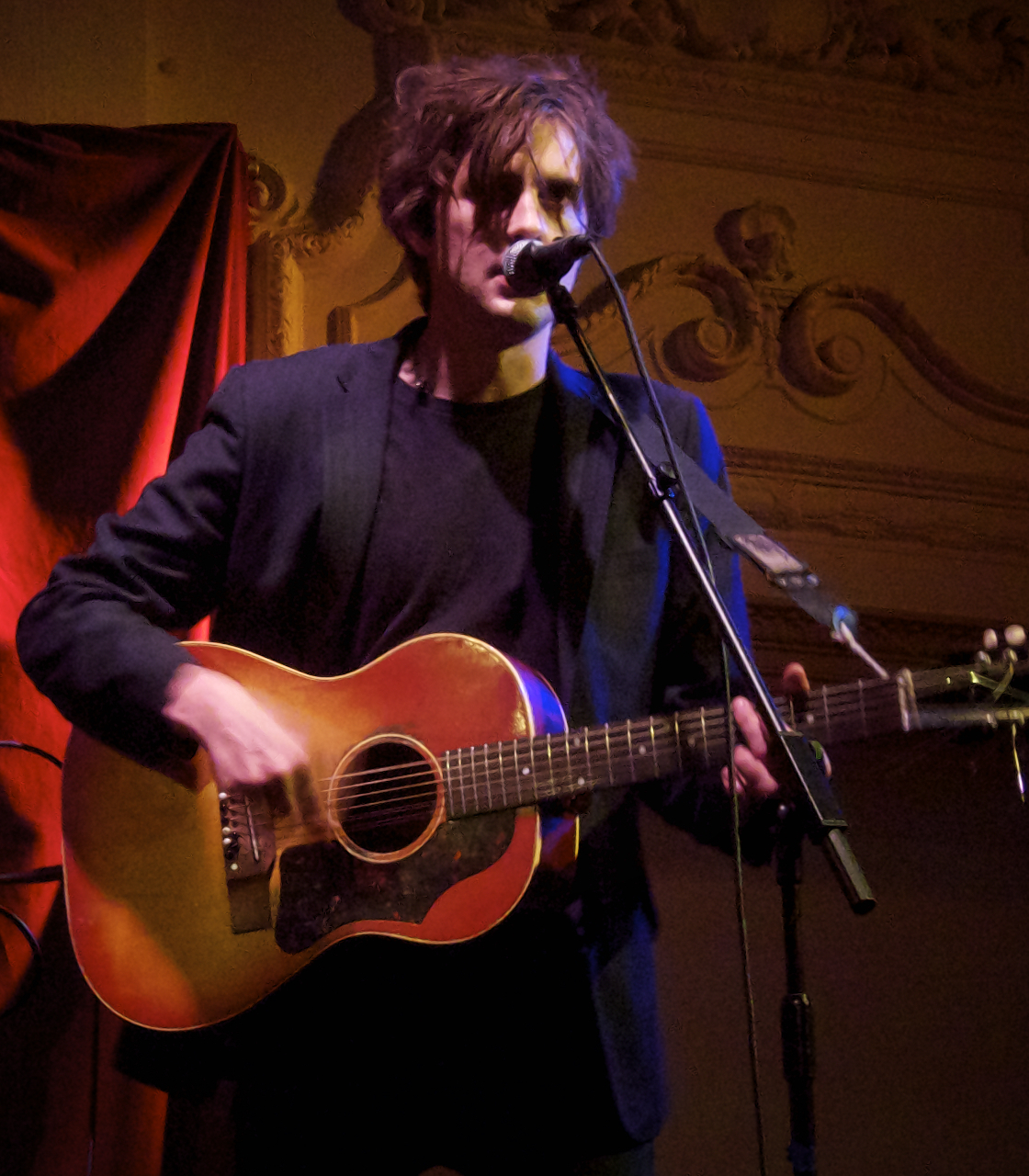
- Crook in 2011

Background information
- Genres: Alternative rock, post-punk, anti-folk
- Occupations: Musician, songwriter, producer
- Instruments: Vocals, guitars, bass, piano, keyboards
- Years active: 2004–present
- Member of: Lupen Crook and the Murderbirds

Lupen Crook is an English songwriter, musician and visual artist.

== Style ==
Initially making his name as an acoustic singer-songwriter, Lupen Crook has gone on to create an eclectic music style incorporating garage rock, "broken folk", "skiffle, hip-hop and gypsy punk", "off-kilter ska" and "gothic folk music". He has been described, variously, as "a solo singer/songwriter of a particularly unique ilk", "insidious, vile, an enigma" "a larger-than-life personality that sometimes wilfully seems to court the reputation of idiot savant and awkward bastard" and "Kent's finest neo-gothic psychedelic folk troubadour".

As influences, Crook has cited Syd Barrett, Carter USM, early Walt Disney and Bon Scott of AC/DC as well as "the spirit that is punk rock, the smell of sex and the sound of stray sods singing out from the Medway Towns." He himself has been compared to artists as diverse as Kevin Coyne, The Jam, The Libertines, Ray Davies, The Clash and Jamie T.

Crook is also a visual artist (working predominantly in oils) who creates the artwork and edition packaging for his own releases as well as exhibiting work formally.

== History ==
=== Initial releases ===
I've always played around with names and I've always needed that... Lupen Crook started off as a character idea, and now I kind of am that person. Names are almost nothing and everything, aren't they? I've always liked the idea that you can set aside what you were before and, not invent a new persona, but find other perspectives within yourself to say "I'm not that person anymore, I'm this person now", and that's what I did with Lupen Crook.

— Lupen Crook on pseudonyms

Lupen Crook emerged as a solo "anti-folk"-style acoustic act in the Medway area in the mid-2000s. His first gigs took place in 2004, and his initial demo CD was given a limited release by a Chatham record label, Tap 'n' Tin Records, in early 2005. Tap 'n' Tin also released his first EP 'Petals Fresh from Road Kill' in August 2005, which was followed up by the 'Halloween' single in October 2005. Crook immediately made an impact with New Musical Express and was included on NME: The Cool List 2005: an experience which he made light of at the time, but would later confess "completely threw me – it made me retreat hugely... I was a far more insecure person back then and I didn't have my gang and my band around me."

Crook released two more short-form releases in 2006 – the 'Love 80' single in March and the EP 'A Silver Boot for Sam' in October.

=== The Murderbirds ===
Initially performing solo, Crook began working regularly with two brothers – Bob Langridge (drums) and Tom Langridge (bass guitar, keyboards) – who became permanent fixtures of live sets, and after the release of Crook's first album, became The Murderbirds. Future releases would be credited either to Lupen Crook or "Lupen Crook and The Murderbirds", although the Langridges often contributed to Lupen Crook solo releases.

Lupen Crook's debut album was Accidents Occur While Sleeping (released in July 2007 on Tap 'n' Tin). The album received a varied critical response (being described as both "schizophrenic" and "cinematic"). Crook himself has referred to the album as being "probably over-ambitious, and as a result (it) was very stop-starty. I personally think it suffers from a sense of suffocation; basically it took too long to record." In November 2007, Crook released the 'Matthew's Magpie' EP, the first release credited to "Lupen Crook and The Murderbirds".

Lupen Crook and The Murderbirds embarked on a UK tour in 2007 in advance of the release of Iscariot the Ladder, their first album as a group. Crook has since described the tour as "a complete disgrace, utter fucking chaos. It didn't do us any favours in the long term, we made a bad reputation for ourselves along the way but for those few weeks we were untouchable punk rockers, who with little in the way of resources, mostly frozen to the bone and filthy right through, built the foundations of a brotherhood that stand stronger than ever today." At the end of the tour, Crook and the Murderbirds briefly relocated to America, spending two weeks living as illegal immigrants in New York City. During their time in New York the band met fiddle and mandolin player Craig Harff, who became the fourth Murderbird.

Iscariot the Ladder was released in February 2008 to mixed reviews. Criticised in some quarters for a lack of songwriting discipline and focus, it was praised in others for its raw recording and outlook, with Subba-Cultcha magazine commenting that "the raw ingrained grime is spread across this second album's runtime like a public toilet's handtowel. Its sordid themes and embittered melodies are all ruptured and flowing, creativity stemmed only by finances and narrow vision. The fantastist wanderings of Lupen's debut opus are less in evidence here; instead, a balance between grim faerytale and dirty reality has been achieved. Tottering between both, the unhinged quality of Lupen's output is just as plain as ever."

=== Beast Reality ===
Iscariot the Ladder was the last record on Crook's contract with Tap 'n' Tin. Having been embroiled in legal disputes with Tap 'n' Tin, Crook went on to set up the Beast Reality label, dedicated to releasing his own material. The label had a strong DIY ethic, delivering releases as downloads or as limited-edition CD releases featuring Crook's own hand-made cover art. Crook has commented that "the whole thing with Beast Reality will be to get material out as much as possible – I'd like to be looking at two to three EPs and an album a year."

The first Beast Reality release was a Lupen Crook solo compilation of archive material called Old Books, Broken Bands And Other Little Treasures which was released in November 2008. In 2009, material written in New York and other home demos saw two Lupen Crook and The Murderbirds releases – the EP The Lost Belongings (in July) and "Great Fears & Curious Predictions" EP in September. During the summer of 2009 Crook had a relapse of his schizoaffective disorder. When recovered, the experience inspired him to release another Murderbirds EP called 'The Curse of the Mirror Wicked' in association with the mental health charity YoungMinds (to whom Crook suggested fans made donations in lieu of paying for the download.

Lupen Crook and The Murderbids released, The Pros and Cons of Eating Out, in 2010, which documented Crook's tumultuous personal life and the bands increasingly dysfunctional nature. The albums eclecticism continued to provoke both interest and irritation in reviewers, with Subba Cultcha magazine complaining "The thing with this album is half of the songs are brilliant and the other half are distinctly average, making makes this album more lopsided than a table with only two legs. Fans of Lupen Crook's earlier work will love this record and everyone else will love half this record." The album was supported by the subsequent release of the 'Dorothy Deserves' EP, featuring a remix of the title track by Howie B.

Internal pressures within the band following the release of "The Pros and Cons of Eating Out" saw Crook permanently return to his solo roots at the close of 2010. The death of Crook's close friend, visual artist 'The MRS', would inspire many of the songs on 2011's "Waiting For The Post-Man". The following year, Crook gathered various musicians from the Medway scene, including members of post-rock instrumentalists UpCDownC. The result was "British Folk Tales", released in 2012. A short tour accompanied the release, finishing at Medway's Royal Function Rooms, for which a hand-made zine, free compilation CD curated by Crook, and night of live music under the banner Non-League Extreme took place, featuring numerous Medway and Kent bands.

=== The Crooked Family ===
During 2009, a collective known as 'The Crooked Family' formed. Based out of 'The Unawarehouse', a disused warehouse on Chatham's 'dirty mile', it was predominantly occupied by Crook and artist Matthew Stephens-Scott, although became a hot-bed for collaborations with various individuals. Crook and The MRS jointly exhibited collections of art, and Crook's solo work and that of The Murderbirds music videos were filmed there. Crook and The MRS were eventually evicted, though 'The Crooked Family' continued to be the identifying house for those creative collaborators surrounding Lupen Crook.

== Discography: (as Lupen Crook) ==
=== Albums ===
- Accidents Occur While Sleeping (Tap 'n' Tin, 2007)
- Old Books, Broken Bands And Other Little Treasures (Beast Reality, 2008)
- Waiting For The Post-Man (Beast Reality, 2011)
- British Folk Tales (TPSP / Beast Reality, 2012)
- How Rotten The Teeth (Beast Reality, 2020)
- Wild Nature (Spinout Nuggets, 2023)

=== Singles and EPs ===
- 'Petals Fresh from Road Kill' EP (Tap 'n' Tin, 2005)
- 'Halloween' (Tap 'n' Tin, 2005)
- 'Love 80' (Tap 'n' Tin, 2005)
- 'A Silver Boot for Sam' EP (Tap 'n' Tin, 2006)
- 'The Curse of the Mirror Wicked' EP (Beast Reality, 2009)
- 'Original Sins" Compilation (Beast Reality, 2010)
- 'Chasing Dragons' (Beast Reality, 2011)
- 'Treasons To be Beautiful' (Beast Reality, 2012)
- 'Christmas On Drugs and Other Cold Cuts' (Beast Reality, 2022)
- 'Ted's Shed' (Beast Reality, 2023)

== Discography: (as Lupen Crook and the Murderbirds) ==
=== Albums ===
- Iscariot the Ladder (Tap 'n' Tin, 2007)
- The Pros and Cons of Eating Out (Beast Reality, 2010)

=== Singles and EPs ===
- 'Matthew's Magpie' (Tap 'n' Tin, 2007)
- 'Great Fears & Curious Predictions' (Beast Reality, 2009)
- 'Curse Of The Mirror Wicked' (Beast Reality, 2009)
- The Lost Belongings (Beast Reality, 2009)
- 'Dorothy Deserves' EP (Beast Reality, 2010)
