= Couples (The Long Blondes album) =

Studio album by The Long Blondes
- Released: 7 April 2008
- Genre: Indie rock
- Label: Rough Trade
- Producer: Erol Alkan

The Long Blondes chronology
Someone to Drive You Home (2006)	Couples (2008)	Singles (2008)

Couples is the second album by the Sheffield band The Long Blondes. It was released on 7 April 2008 by Rough Trade Records, with the first single, "Century", released on 24 March 2008. The quotation marks in the album title were included as a reference to the David Bowie album "Heroes".

== Recording ==
The album was recorded in October 2007.produced by Erol Alkan who had previously produced many of the band's B-sides including "Fulwood Babylon", "All Bar One Girls" and "Five Ways to End It".

== Reception ==
Professional ratings
Review scores
Source	Rating
Allmusic	4/5 stars
Drowned In Sound	(8/10)
The Guardian	4/5 stars
The Independent	positive
Metro	5/5 stars
Mojo	4/5 stars
Music OMH	4.5/5 stars
NME	(6/10)
Pitchfork Media	(5.8/10)
Uncut	4/5 stars

The album was generally well received by critics. The Independent called it "one of the albums of the year from one of the bands of the decade". The Fly described it as "a dark, sultry and sublime album" and gave it a four out of five stars. Uncut gave the album four stars and called it a "sleek, sexy affair....Flirtations with a darker sound and Donna Summer-style disco emerge", Mojo labelled the album "ambitious and close to unique". Drowned in Sound said that the band had created "an ambitious, forward-thinking pop record that tops their debut by quite some distance", and Allmusic called the LP an "exciting, challenging, daring listen that's full of brains".

Despite good reactions from many music critics in the UK, Pitchfork Media had an average take on the album, writing that "In an attempt to be taken seriously, they've sacrificed too much of their effervescent appeal." The album was rewarded a 5.8/10, compared to the 8.2 score their debut album received.

Click Music's Andrew Grillo named Couples his ninth best album of 2008.

== Track listing ==
All tracks written by The Long Blondes.

1. "Century" – 5:36
2. "Guilt" – 4:35
3. "The Couples" – 3:37
4. "I Liked the Boys" – 1:59
5. "Here Comes the Serious Bit" – 2:49
6. "Round the Hairpin" – 5:43
7. "Too Clever by Half" – 4:26
8. "Erin O'Connor" – 3:09
9. "Nostalgia" – 3:12
10. "I'm Going to Hell" – 5:58

Bonus tracks

11. "Picture of You" (iTunes bonus track)
12. "Going Grey" (iTunes bonus track)

== Personnel ==
=== The Long Blondes ===
- Emma Chaplin – guitars, keyboards, vocals
- Dorian Cox – guitars, keyboards, vocals, lyrics (except on tracks 1 and 4)
- Reenie Hollis – bass guitar, vocals
- Kate Jackson – lead vocals, lyrics (on tracks 1 and 4), artwork
- Screech Louder – drums

=== Technical personnel ===
- Erol Alkan – producer, mixer
- Jimmy Robertson – engineer
- Mark 'Elton' Alloway – assistant engineer
- John Sephton – assistant engineer
- Paul Harris – assistant engineer
- Guy Davie – mastering, at the Exchange
- Kate Jackson – artwork
- Steve Harries – photography
