= Selfish Cunt =

- Origin: London, England
- Genres: Post-punk revival, art rock, electronic
- Years active: 2003–2012
- Members: Martin Tomlinson - vocals Patrick Constable - guitar Bambi - drums Matthew J. Saw
- Website: MySpace.com

Selfish Cunt were a rock band based in London, England. The band was formed in early 2003 by Martin Tomlinson and Patrick Constable, and was noted for provocative lyrics, aggressive stage shows, and electronic-influenced rock. Their mix of electric guitar and electronic drum machines was typically accompanied by politically charged and often sexually graphic lyrics. Later becoming a four-piece band through the addition of drums, bass guitar and ceasing to use a drum machine, they developed a sound which incorporated elements of punk and post hardcore.

Reaction from critics was mixed. In 2004 The Guardian placed Selfish Cunt at #40 on its list of "top 40 bands in Britain today".

== History ==
Selfish Cunt was formed in 2003 at the start of a post-punk revival. Blackburn-born frontman Tomlinson was working in theatre, while guitarist Patrick Constable was playing in the art rock band Dirty Snow. Tomlinson stated: "We decided to do Selfish Cunt because although we're from really different practices, the connection is music."

After touring small clubs, mainly in London, the duo released the single "Britain Is Shit" / "Fuck The Poor"; a second single, "Authority Confrontation", briefly entered the UK Singles Chart at No. 66.

Selfish Cunt were banned from the Institute of Contemporary Arts, On The Rocks, and The Egg after a series of destructive acts, including the sabotage of the band Snow Patrol's equipment.

A brawl outside of Buckingham Palace involving Tomlinson, Babyshambles frontman Pete Doherty, Dominic Masters of The Others, and photographer Andrew Kendall during an NME photoshoot was reported in the press in 2004.

Selfish Cunt released their second album English Chamber Music in September 2008

A Third album Shaved was recorded in 2010 for Japanese label 51 Records and released only in Japan.

They disbanded in 2012

== Discography ==
=== Singles ===
- "Britain Is Shit" / "Fuck the Poor" (2003, Horseglue Records)
- "Authority Confrontation" / "Full Swing" (2004, Horseglue Records)
- "My Prerogative" (2004, Horseglue Records)
- "The Mechanic" (2007, LoveHowlMuse)
- "Avocado" (2007, LoveHowlMuse)
- "England Made Me II" (2008, Sparrow's Tear)

=== Albums ===
- No Wicked Heart Shall Prosper (2004, Horseglue Records)
1. "Corporate Slut"
2. "Fuck the Poor"
3. "Pro Patriotic"
4. "Coming of the White Man"
5. "Full Swing"
6. "Crackney Browns"
7. "I Love New York"
8. "My Prerogative"
9. "Authority Confrontation"
10. "Yes"
11. "Britain is Shit"

- English Chamber Music (2008, Sparrow's Tear Records)
1. "Intro"
2. "Whip Goes the Crack"
3. "Feel Like a Woman"
4. "Bullet To The Brain"
5. "Avocado"
6. "Born in a Mess"
7. "The Mechanic"
8. "England Made Me II"
9. "I Got It On Slow"
10. "Born from a Mother"
11. "Outro"
