= Indie-Schmindie =

Musical classification

"Indie-schmindie" is a term that entered common usage in the British and Irish press in the late 1990s and 2000s which referred to an interchangeable group of indifferent Indie rock bands.

== Origin ==
The term was coined by an Edinburgh University student using the byline 'Pjem' in an article published in the Student newspaper on 4 May 1995.

In a column titled 'Sounding Off' about a summer job in a plastic bottle factory, Pjem wrote: "When I got home at night, the last thing I wanted to listen to was the then-usual mean diet of indie-schmindie, paltry guitar whining, Evening Session mediocrity or the latest mincing hype. I wanted to listen to Black Sabbath."

Although the column did not name any 'indie-schmindie' bands, other articles of the time by Pjem regularly criticised Sleeper, Menswear and above all Ned's Atomic Dustbin.

== History ==
The term 'Indie-schmindie' became widely and frequently used in the British music press, including Melody Maker, Music Week and NME., but also crossed into mass circulation newspapers, including The Times, Irish Times, Irish Independent, The Guardian, Scotsman, Independent and Observer.

It was often applied to the Glasgow bands Travis and Belle & Sebastian.

Although first used in a dismissive sense, the term was latterly applied more loosely to Indie rock bands, often to denote whimsicality, losing some of its original venom.

It was also adopted by some musicians

It was used as the name of more than 100 shows on the Phoenix FM community radio station between December 2019 and September 2022.

=== See also ===
Shm-reduplication
