= The Long Blondes =

English indie rock band

- The Long Blondes

Background information
- Origin: Sheffield, England
- Genres: Indie rock, indie pop, post-punk revival
- Years active: 2003–2008, 2021–2022
- Label: Rough Trade
- Past members: Kate Jackson; Dorian Cox; Reenie Hollis; Emma Chaplin; Screech Louder
- Website: thelongblondes.com

The Long Blondes were an English indie rock band formed in Sheffield in 2003 by Dorian Cox (lead guitar and keyboards), Reenie Hollis (real name Kathryn Hollis) (bass guitar and backing vocals), Emma Chaplin (rhythm guitar, keyboards and backing vocals), Kate Jackson (lead vocals) and Screech Louder (real name Mark Turvey, drums).

After several critically acclaimed singles, and having built a strong live following, they released their debut album, Someone to Drive You Home, on Rough Trade Records in November 2006. Their second album, Couples, was produced by Erol Alkan and released in April 2008, it was notably less successful than their first album. In October 2008 the band announced their immediate split due to Dorian Cox having suffered a stroke.

In 2021 The Long Blondes reunited as a duo composed of Jackson and Cox, however after allegations of sexual impropriety were made against Cox by an ex-girlfriend in 2022, they broke up again. In 2026 Kate Jackson ruled out the possibility of another Long Blondes reunion. A retrospective of the group described them as having 'saved indie landfill' with their originality.

== Career ==
The band was formed in 2003 in Sheffield, United Kingdom. All the members were attending, or had attended university in the city. The following quote appeared on their website and served as an introduction to the Long Blondes; "Our shared influences include The Mael Brothers, Marx Brothers and The Bewlay Brothers. We do not listen to The Beatles, The Rolling Stones, Jimi Hendrix, The Doors or Bob Dylan. We chose an instrument each and learnt to play it.". The band have stated that the original inspiration for The Long Blondes was to form a fantasy pop group: "Nico, Nancy Sinatra, Diana Dors and Barbara Windsor. Sexy and literate, flippant and heartbreaking all at once." Singer Kate Jackson was inspired by bands with front women like Siouxsie and the Banshees and Blondie.

=== Independent releases ===
In July 2004, The Long Blondes released their debut single "New Idols" on the local Thee Sheffield Phonographic Corporation label. This was followed by singles "Autonomy Boy" and "Giddy Stratospheres", on Angular. In 2005, they released further singles, "Appropriation (By Any Other Name)" and "Separated By Motorways", the latter being produced by Paul Epworth and released on his own Good & Evil label. These releases were met with a positive critical reaction and growing media attention.

Still unsigned, in February 2006 the band were recipients of the NME Philip Hall Radar Award, which in previous years was won by Franz Ferdinand and Kaiser Chiefs. Further adding to their reputation, the band were named by The Guardian and Vogue as "the best unsigned band in the UK". As they were unsigned, during the early success of the band, members remained working in various day jobs; Jackson sold vintage clothing on eBay, Cox was working in the University of Sheffield Department of Law, Hollis in the Media Studies department of a nearby college, Chaplin in a Leeds art library and Louder in the Home Office.

=== Someone to Drive You Home ===
On 13 April 2006 they signed to Rough Trade Records and began recording their debut album over the summer with Steve Mackey, the bassist with Pulp. The album was preceded by the singles "Weekend Without Makeup" in July and "Once and Never Again", which was released on 23 October and debuted at number 30 in the UK Singles Chart. The song was named the 15th best track of 2006 by NME. Someone to Drive You Home was released in November 2006. The music was written by the band collectively while the majority of the lyrics were written by Cox with Jackson completing the lyrics for "Separated by Motorways" and "Madame Ray". Critical reception was generally positive with the NME calling it "fantasy pop, performed to perfection" in a 9/10 review.

Reviews picked up on the predominant themes of the album; outsider status, popular culture references from the 1950s and 60s and relationships from a female perspective. Other reviews indicated the numerous inspirations for the work. For example, a four-star review in The Guardian said that "if talent borrows but genius steals ... the Long Blondes should be taking their Mensa tests", comparing the album's style to Franz Ferdinand and 80s indie-pop band The Flatmates. Some noted the impact of Jackson's voice; Colin Roberts of Drowned in Sound said "her delivery is like a public address call across a Sunday marketplace" while The Guardian said it was "marvellously belting, if unsubtle". A 3-star review in Uncut magazine recognised the ambition of the band's sound, advising that they should acquire "a ruthless pop producer, one who can coax them out of their indie-pop dowdiness – like Blondie needed Mike Chapman, like ABC needed Horn."

The band appeared at a number of UK festivals over the summer of 2006, including the Carling Weekend. In 2007, they played on the Other Stage at the Glastonbury Festival.

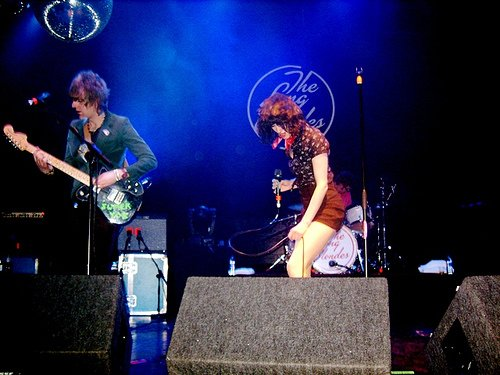
The Long Blondes live at the London Astoria, 2007

=== Couples and Singles ===
After an extended European tour, in October 2007 The Long Blondes began work on their second album with producer Erol Alkan, who had previously produced their more dance orientated b-sides such as "Five Ways To End It" and "Fulwood Babylon". On 19 December 2007, it was announced that the new album's title would be Couples. The title alludes to the David Bowie album "Heroes" and also to a loose theme of the album as a "big breakup album". Before the album was released, all five members created their own cryptic promo videos explaining the inspiration behind Couples. The band stated that the album drew influences from Italo disco revival acts such as Glass Candy and the Italians Do It Better label. and ABBA. Cox stated that "...there's something really innocent about Abba videos... really kinda funny, futuristic but old fashioned at the same time and that's how we see our music on this album.". By the time of the recording, the two couples in the band, Cox and Chaplin and Turvey and Hollis, had broken up and inter-band relations had deteriorated.

Couples' was released on 7 April 2008, preceded by a single, "Century", released on 24 March 2008. The album reached number 48 in the UK album chart. The album was generally well received by critics. Click Music gave the album a 4.5 out of 5 and said it was "a worthy contender for record of the year". The Guardian gave the album another 4-star review, noting the album's shift in style – saying that some tracks shared "more with the cinematic perfection of Kylie Minogue's "Confide in Me" than the kitchen sink dramas of Pulp". A mixed 6/10 review in NME said the album was "not terrible, but disappointing" and "whereas once they sang of suburban boredom tempered with the thrill of escape, now they've started to sound like they'd be happy to stay put". After "Century", the next song to be taken off the album was "Guilt", which was released on 7" and digital download.

On 9 June 2008, the band posted on their official website that Cox had fallen ill and that he had to be rushed to hospital, which meant that they had to cancel all their live appearances until the end of July. The band were due to play a support slot on Duran Duran's Red Carpet Massacre tour at the Birmingham NIA and the O2 Arena in London and on the John Peel stage at Glastonbury.

After Couples, the band decided to release a compilation of their rare early 7" singles, which was titled Singles on 20 October 2008 on Angular Records. The twelve track album collected all of the songs from the band's first singles. The version of "Separated By Motorways" differs from the single version produced by Paul Epworth, instead the group opted to include the demo version instead. The compilation also featured one previously unreleased song – "Peterborough". Singles was named the 25th best album of 2008 by Artrocker magazine.

==== Breakup and aftermath ====
On 20 October 2008, Cox posted a message on their official website that The Long Blondes band had split up, the main reason for this being Cox's recent stroke which would prevent him from participation in band duties for an indefinite period of time. The announcement was made the same day their compilation Singles was released, with the inside of the rear album art also containing news of the break-up. Upon their split, The Guardian wrote an article entitled "Why music will miss the Long Blondes".

Hollis joined a band called "Nature Set" who released a single in 2011, before going on to pursue a career in digital recruitment. Turvey left the music business for a successful career in education as a head teacher. Chaplin left the music business and has maintained a low public profile.

Kate Jackson performed with various bands following the break up of The Long Blondes. In 2016, her debut album British Road Movies, a collaboration between her and Bernard Butler of Suede, was released to positive reviews, holding a 76% approval rating on Metacritic, although was not a commercial success. Following the Long Blondes break-up Jackson started building a career as a visual artist.

Following the breakup, Dorian Cox's formed a band called 'Unmade Bed' who made a number of songs available online, with their final release in 2012.

==== Final Long Blondes Reunion ====
In late 2021, talk of a Long Blondes reunion started to appear in media, and indeed in 2022 it was confirmed that Cox and Jackson would be performing as a duo for the first time since 2008, using The Long Blondes name. No official explanation was given for the absence of the other members of the band, and the newly reformed duo started performing shows shows in mid-2022, with plans for a new album reported. However, in August 2022 allegations of sexual impropriety were made against Cox by his ex-girlfriend Victoria Lane; on 11th August Jackson announced she would be stepping away from the band until the matter was resolved by police and all the scheduled shows were cancelled.

Although no charges were ever presented against Cox, the Long Blondes did not reform, and Kate Jackson said in 2026 interview that she regarded the band as a 'thing of the past'. Jackson added that although she would like to perform Long Blondes songs again, she would only do so with different musicians. Jackson has continued her career as a visual artist.

==== After the Long Blondes ====
The accusations against Cox caused the publishing of his autobiography to be cancelled. Cox maintains a lower public profile.

Kate Jackson has continued her career as a visual artist.

== Musical style ==
=== Influences ===
The Long Blondes' songs reflect a number of influences, including 60s pop, Buzzcocks, The Fall, The Ramones, Suede, post-punk and new wave. Jackson's vocals have been compared to Ari Up of The Slits, Deborah Harry of Blondie and Lesley Woods of Au Pairs. The music features angular guitars and prominent bass guitar lines. However, the band themselves claim somewhat more eclectic influences than their sound suggests, citing Burt Bacharach, Holland-Dozier-Holland, Chinn and Chapman, and Stock, Aitken and Waterman as influences. The band named some of their actual influences and favourite bands. Chaplin's were The Smiths, Sweet and The Jesus and Mary Chain. Hollis's were Belle and Sebastian, ELO and The Eagles. Cox's were ABBA and The Fall. Louder's were Scott Walker, The Slits and Captain Beaky. Jackson's were The Smiths, The Fall and Nancy Sinatra and Lee Hazlewood. Screech Louder cited Siouxsie and the Banshees, a group they were likened by the critics. Louder said about them: "[Siouxsie and the Banshees] made much more interesting records than any of the instant hits could manage, and they didn't run out of ideas after the first few singles. Like Pulp, they're testament to the power of waiting".

=== Intertextual references ===
The Long Blondes are known for referencing films, singers, starlets and artists in their music. Screech Louder said that Alfred Hitchcock was a big inspiration when it came to referencing films in their music, he said "the whole film noir thing is very important because it's stylish but there's depth to it as well".

==== Lyrics ====
- "Darts" mentions British darts player Bobby George and darts commentator Sid Waddell.
- "Erin O'Connor" is a homage to Erin O'Connor which also mentions fellow model, Lily Cole. It begins with a line by Ronnie Corbett and David Swift from the BBC play No Sex Please, We're British.
- "Five Ways To End It" mentions Carry On star Hattie Jacques and also the producer of the Carry On films, Peter Rogers.
- "I Liked The Boys" ends with "Not the most original sentiment I've ever heard, so what's new" which is a line from a radio show by Terry Wogan. Whilst recording the second album, they found an old reel-to-reel radio recording and decided to use parts in some of their songs.
- "I'm Going To Hell" ends with a line by Peter Sellers.
- "Long Blonde" mentions punk band Ramones, one of their influences.
- "Lust in the Movies" mentions underground actresses such as 60's socialite and muse, Edie Sedgwick, American actress Arlene Dahl & French actress Anna Karina. Also the repeated line "Nag nag nag" is a reference to the same repeated lyric in the song "Nag Nag Nag" by Sheffield band Cabaret Voltaire.
- "Madame Ray" is inspired by Lee Miller, the photographer and muse of avent-garde artist Man Ray.
- "Melville Farr" is based on Dirk Bogarde's character in the 1961 British film Victim.
- "Never To Be Repeated" references film-star Greta Garbo.
- "Only Lovers Left Alive" takes its title from the 1964 science fiction novel by Dave Wallis, and includes the title of 1950s film From Here To Eternity as a lyric.
- "Round The Hairpin" begins with a line by British comedian Kenny Everett.
- "Swallow Tattoo" has a lyric ("you fill me with inertia") which is a reference to the parody pop band fronted by Peter Cook in Bedazzled.
- "You Could Have Both" namechecks American singer Scott Walker. The song also alludes to the Morrissey song "My Love Life". The song also mentions the character of C.C. 'Bud' Baxter from The Apartment.

==== Artwork ====
- Before Couples was released, all five members created their own cryptic promo videos "explaining" what the inspiration behind Couples was. Jackson explained who inspired the album cover, she found artist Richard Hamilton, videos by ABBA, Lee Miller and Le Corbusier to be the main inspiration.
- The two front covers of "Weekend Without Makeup" are paintings of Diana Dors.
- The front cover of their debut album Someone to Drive You Home is a painting by Kate Jackson of Faye Dunaway in the film Bonnie and Clyde, with a Mark 3 Ford Cortina as her getaway car. The artwork inside the album sleeve is a painting of Nicolas Cage & Laura Dern in the film Wild at Heart.
- The front cover of "New Idols" is a painting of Diana Dors in Yield to the Night.

=== Style ===
Front-woman Kate Jackson was featured in The Guardian's style section and NME's Cool List, moving from 39 in 2005 to 7 in 2006. When questioned about her place in the first NME list by The Guardian, Jackson remarked "Probably because they didn't have enough girls. It was so overrun with boring boys, they needed someone to bring a touch of glamour." Jackson describes her style as "Bonnie Parker meets a Carry On girl".

== Legacy ==
Although enjoying only limited success at the time, The Long Blondes have subsequently been praised for differing from other, all-male, bands of that time, many of whom followed a similar formula and style such as The Pigeon Detectives, The View and The Paddingtons.

== Discography ==
=== Albums ===
Year	Album information	Chart positions	
Year	Album information	UK	UK Indie Chart
2006	Someone to Drive You Home: Released: 6 November 2006; Label: Rough Trade	44	1
2008	Couples: Released: 7 April 2008; Label: Rough Trade	48	2

=== Compilations ===
Year	Album information	Chart positions	
Year	Album information	UK	UK Indie Chart
2008	Singles: Compilation album; Released: 20 October 2008; Label: Angular Records		

=== Singles and EPs ===
Date	Single		UK Chart position	Included on:
Date	A-side	B-side(s)	UK Chart position	Included on:
July 2004	"New Idols"	"Long Blonde"		Singles
30 September 2004	"Autonomy Boy"	"Long Blonde"		Singles
29 November 2004	"Giddy Stratospheres"	"Polly", "Darts"		Singles
June 2005	"Giddy Stratospheres"	"Polly", "Autonomy Boy", "Darts"		Singles
13 June 2005	"Appropriation (By Any Other Name)"	"My Heart Is Out of Bounds", "Lust in the Movies"	83	Singles
12 December 2005	"Separated By Motorways"	"Big Infatuation"		
26 June 2006	"Weekend Without Makeup"	"Fulwood Babylon", "Platitudes", "Last Night on Northgate Street"	28	Someone to Drive You Home
23 October 2006	"Once And Never Again"	"Five Ways To End It", "The Whippet Fancier", "Who Are You To Her?"	30	Someone to Drive You Home
5 February 2007	"Giddy Stratospheres"	"All Bar One Girls", "Never To Be Repeated", "I'm Coping"	37	Someone to Drive You Home
September 2007	"Five Ways To End It/Fulwood Babylon (Erol Alkan Remixes)"			
24 March 2008	"Century"	"The Unbearable Lightness of Buildings"		Couples
30 June 2008	"Guilt"	"Melville Farr", "Good As Gold", "Too Happy"		Couples

=== Other releases ===
- "Christmas Is Cancelled" was released by the band on a limited run of CD-Rs in Christmas 2004.

== Music videos ==
The Long Blondes were also known for their cheap and glamorous music videos. Their first proper music video was "Appropriation (By Any Other Name)" which was directed by Rupert Noble, a music video director they regularly made videos with after.

Date	Video	Director
July 2004	"New Idols"	Reenie Hollis
September 2004	"Autonomy Boy"	Reenie Hollis
September 2004	"Long Blonde"	Reenie Hollis
November 2004	"Giddy Stratospheres"	Reenie Hollis
June 2005	"Appropriation (By Any Other Name)"	Rupert Noble
December 2005	"Separated By Motorways"	Rupert Noble
June 2006	"Weekend Without Makeup"	Gina Birch
October 2006	"Once And Never Again"	Rupert Noble
February 2007	"Giddy Stratospheres"	Rupert Noble
March 2008	"Century"	Minsu Song
June 2008	"Guilt"	Abby Warrilow & Lewis Gourlay

== Awards and nominations ==
In 2006 The Long Blondes received the Philip Hall Radar Award at the NME Awards honouring rising talent, which in previous years has accurately predicted big things for Kaiser Chiefs and Franz Ferdinand.

Year	Award	Category	Result
2006	NME Awards	Philip Hall Radar Award	Won
