= Late of the Pier =

English dance-punk band (2004–2010)

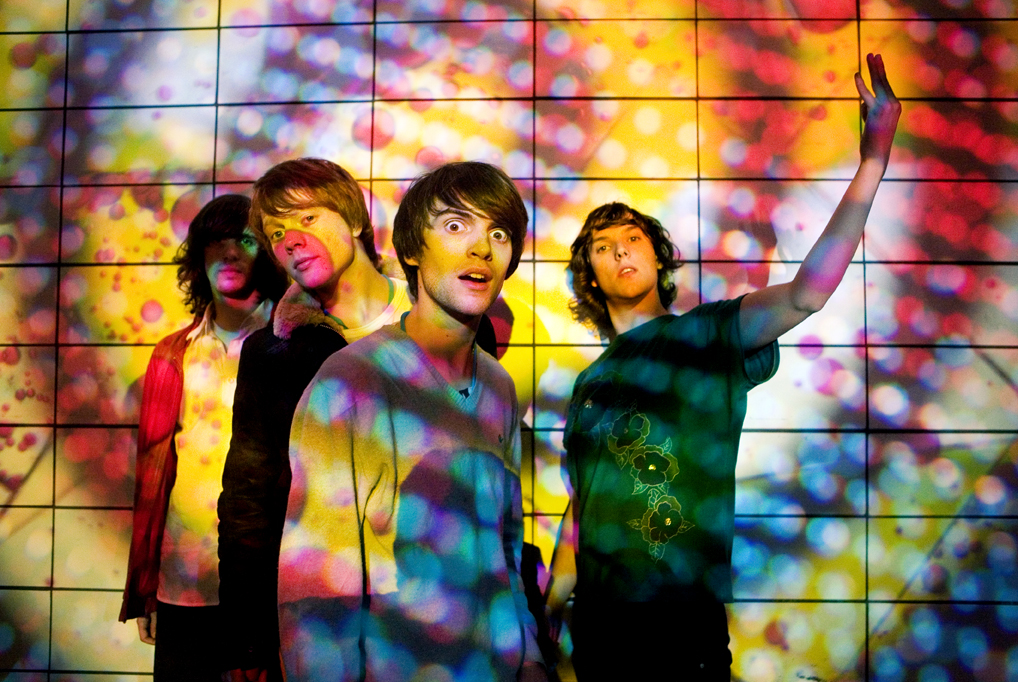
- Late of the Pier in 2008

Background information
- Origin: Castle Donington, England
- Genres: Dance-punk revival; glam rock; progressive rock
- Years active: 2004–2010
- Labels: Parlophone (UK); Zarcorp (UK); Astralwerks (US); Phantasy (UK)
- Spinoffs: LA Priest; A Tribute To February Montaine; Soft Hair
- Past members: Samuel Eastgate; Andrew Faley; Sam Potter; Ross Dawson

Late of the Pier was an English four-piece dance-punk revival band from Castle Donington, signed to Parlophone. Their debut album Fantasy Black Channel, produced by Erol Alkan, was released in 2008 by Parlophone.

== History ==
=== Formation, Zarcorp Demo and Fantasy Black Channel (2004–2010) ===
The band formed in 2004, although some of the songs they perform were written before this, with some dating back to 2001. Their debut single, "Space and the Woods", was released through WayOutWest Records, and featured on the band's Zarcorp Demo EP in March 2007. The band's second single "Bathroom Gurgle" was produced by Erol Alkan and was released by Moshi Moshi Records in September 2007. Their third single, "The Bears Are Coming", was released on 12" and download only, with 7" versions being sold exclusively on their February 2008 tour. This was released through the band's own Zarcorp label. Their fourth single, a double A-side including a new version of "Space and the Woods" as well as "Focker", was released following a headline slot on the Levi's Ones To Watch tour.

Late of the Pier opened 2007's Reading and Leeds Festivals on the NME/Radio One stage, while appearing on the festival's Republic stage the following year. The band have performed in support slots for Hadouken!, Soulwax, Justice and U.N.K.L.E., as well as supporting Kaiser Chiefs on their 2008 UK tour.

Their debut album, Fantasy Black Channel, was released by Parlophone on 11 August 2008. On 7 September 2009, it was voted winner of the Neptune Music Prize on the Drowned in Sound website.

They released a new single titled "Blueberry" as a digital download on 17 December 2009, and as a double A-Side in February 2010 with "Best in the Class". Following this release, the band concentrated on a number of side projects and personal work, and stated that it was unlikely that new material would be forthcoming.

=== Side projects (2010–2015) ===
Lead singer Sam Eastgate featured on Filthy Dukes' track "This Rhythm" on their debut album Nonsense in the Dark, and produced Manchester indie pop band Egyptian Hip Hop's debut double A-side single "Wild Human Child"/"Heavenly". He also toured as part of New Zealand indie twee act Connan Mockasin's band on his 2010 album release tour around New Zealand.

Sam Potter co-wrote music on Franz Ferdinand's 2018 album Always Ascending, and formed tribute act A Tribute to February Montaine in honour of lo-fi pop artist February Montaine. He also ran Blackout, a music event that ran at London venue Oval Space, where anonymous musicians played in the pitch black. Ross Dawson did some session work and joined London based band Zibra in summer 2014, but left in early 2015.

In early 2015, Eastgate released the album Inji and its lead single "Oino" under the name LA Priest.

On 21 May 2015, the band's former label Parlophone announced the death of drummer Ross Dawson. A press release from the musician's family, via the label, stated that Dawson was "involved in a very sudden and tragic accident" on 15 May. Dawson's family write, "Ross was a monumental force in the lives of everybody who knew him, multi-talented, modest, kind and generous; he loved and was loved by his family. The world has become a sadder place without him. He will be eternally missed by all who knew and loved him."

=== Fantasy Black Channel reissue (2015–present) ===
In August 2018, the band resurfaced in a series of cryptic posts on a newly created Instagram account. In December 2018, the band announced a vinyl reissue of Fantasy Black Channel via Phantasy Sound. Bundled with a download code for a digital album of unreleased demos and outtakes, the reissue was released on 19 January 2019.

== Musical style ==
Late of the Pier's style has often been compared to artists like Gary Numan, Brian Eno, Stephen Dubrich, Bill Nelson of Be-Bop Deluxe fame, and the more contemporary Metronomy and Klaxons, mainly due to the prominent use of synthesisers in an off-kilter pop style. Influences included Duran Duran, Erasure, Orchestral Manoeuvres in the Dark and Sparks.

== Discography ==
=== Albums ===
List of studio albums, with selected chart positions
Title	Album details	Peak chart positions			
Title	Album details	UK	BEL	BEL Alt.	SCO
Fantasy Black Channel	Released: 30 July 2008; Label: Parlophone, Toshiba EMI; Format: CD, LP, digital download	28	68	30	70

=== Singles ===
List of singles, with selected chart positions, showing year released and album
Title	Year	Peak chart positions			Album
Title	Year	UK	UK Indie	SCO	Album
"Space and the Woods"	2007	—	—	—	Zarcorp Demo
"Bathroom Gurgle"	2007	— (Note: "Bathroom Gurgle" did not enter the UK Singles Chart, but peaked at number 77 on the UK Physical Singles Chart Top 100.)	—	74	Fantasy Black Channel
"The Bears Are Coming"	2008	—	—	—	Fantasy Black Channel
"Space and the Woods / Focker"	2008	—	—	—	Fantasy Black Channel
"Heartbeat"	2008	98	—	22	Fantasy Black Channel
"Bathroom Gurgle" (re-issue)	2008	— (Note: "Bathroom Gurgle" (re-issue) did not enter the UK Singles Chart, but peaked at number 57 on the UK Physical Singles Chart Top 100.)	—	44	Fantasy Black Channel
"Blueberry"	2009	—	42	—	Non-album singles
"Best in the Class"	2010	—	—	—	Non-album singles
"—" denotes release did not chart.

=== Music videos ===
Year	Title	Director(s)
2007	"Bathroom Gurgle"	Daniel Brereton
2008	"The Bears Are Coming"	Saam Farahmand
2008	"Space and the Woods"	Ian Emes
2008	"Focker"	Daniel Brereton
2008	"Heartbeat"	MEGAFORCE
2009	"Blueberry"	Andrew Faley & Fred Glenister
2010	"Best in the Class"	Sam Potter & Steve Glashier

=== Demos ===
- 2005: Refill Men Twist & The Zarcorp Legacy
- 2007: Zarcorp Demo
