= Someone to Drive You Home =

Someone To Drive you Home

Studio album by The Long Blondes
- Released: 6 November 2006
- Recorded: July 2006, Konk Studios, London
- Genre: Indie rock
- Length: US release: 62:42
- Label: Rough Trade
- Producer: Steve Mackey

The Long Blondes chronology
Someone To Drive you Home (2006)	Couples (2008)

Professional ratings
Aggregate scores
Source	Rating
Metacritic	81/100
Review scores
Source	Rating
AllMusic	5/5 stars
Drowned in Sound	8/10
The Guardian	4/5 stars
Mojo	4/5 stars
musicOMH	4/5 stars
NME	9/10
The Observer	4/5 stars
Pitchfork	8.2/10
Stylus	B+
This Is Fake DIY	4.5/5 stars

Someone To Drive You Home is the debut album by The Long Blondes. It was released on 6 November 2006. It received widespread critical praise and was placed 7th in the NME's best 50 albums of 2006 list and features in many other best of lists for 2006.

The predominant theme of the album is relationships from a female perspective, although 10 of the tracks on the album were written by male guitarist Dorian Cox. Themes dealt with include competition between females, isolation, sexual exploration and deceit. Influences of Pulp, Elastica, Morrissey and Blondie have been frequently quoted when the album is discussed in the media.

The title of the album comes from a line in the song "You Could Have Both".

The album's artwork is a painting by lead singer Kate Jackson; it is an image of Faye Dunaway in the film Bonnie and Clyde, with a Mark 3 Ford Cortina as her getaway car. The artwork inside the album sleeve is a painting of Nicolas Cage & Laura Dern in the film Wild At Heart.

== Track listing ==
1. "Lust in the Movies" – 3:05
2. "Once And Never Again" – 2:56
3. "Only Lovers Left Alive" – 3:59
4. "Giddy Stratospheres" – 5:08
5. "In the Company of Women" – 2:39
6. "Heaven Help the New Girl" – 3:54
7. "Separated by Motorways" – 2:19
8. "You Could Have Both" – 4:47
9. "Swallow Tattoo" – 2:31
10. "Weekend Without Makeup" – 4:11
11. "Madame Ray" – 3:30
12. "A Knife for the Girls" – 5:08

=== US bonus disc ===
1. "Fulwood Babylon" – 4:05
2. "Five Ways to End It" – 6:06
3. "Never to Be Repeated" – 3:43
4. "All Bar One Girls" – 4:09

=== 15th Anniversary Edition Disc 2 ===
1. "Five Ways To End It" – 6:06
2. "Fulwood Babylon" – 4:05
3. "The Whippet Fancier" – 3:46
4. "Who Are You To Her?" – 4:29
5. "Never To Be Repeated" – 3:43
6. "All Bar One Girls" – 4:09
7. "I'm Coping" – 3:13
8. "Last Night On Northgate St" – 2:54
9. "Platitudes" – 3:18
10. "Melville Farr" – 1:37
11. "The Unbearable Lightness Of Buildings" – 5:42

== Personnel ==
=== The Long Blondes ===
- Emma Chaplin: guitars, keyboards, vocals
- Dorian Cox: guitars, keyboards, vocals, lyrics except on tracks 7 and 11
- Reenie Hollis: bass guitar, vocals
- Kate Jackson: lead vocals, lyrics on tracks 7 and 11, artwork
- Screech Louder: drums

=== Other ===
- Produced and mixed by: Steve Mackey and Richard Flack
- Assistant engineers: Ben Mason, Serge Krebs
- Mastered by: Guy Davie at the Exchange
- Logo by: Matt Bolton
- Layout by: Jeff Teader
