= Giddy Stratospheres =

Single by The Long Blondes
- Released: 29 November 2004
- Genre: Indie rock
- Label: Angular Recording
- Songwriter: Dorian Cox

The Long Blondes singles chronology
"Autonomy Boy" (2004)	"Giddy Stratospheres" (2004)	"Appropriation (By Any Other Name)" (2005)

Alternative cover
- 2007 re-release version

The Long Blondes singles chronology
"Once and Never Again" (2006)	"Giddy Stratospheres" (2007)	"Century" (2008)

"Giddy Stratospheres" was a 7-inch single only release by Sheffield band the Long Blondes. It was released on 29 November 2004, on Angular Records. The single was accompanied by two B-sides, "Polly" and "Darts". The single was re-released in 2007 and was the third major label single from their debut album, Someone to Drive You Home. The single peaked at number 37 on the UK Singles Chart. Both versions were very well received by critics.

== Music and structure ==
"Giddy Stratospheres" is a fast-tempo song, at 136 beats per minute (bpm), and in the key of B major for the verses. For the chorus, it switches to a slightly faster tempo (142 bmp) and changes to a key of E♭ major. Its style combines post-punk, indie pop and disco. The main chord pattern of the verse alternates between G sharp minor and B major triads, the chorus switching to A♭ major, F minor and C minor.

The song is in a standard verse-chorus form, with a modulating bridge before and after each chorus. The song features indie rock instrumentation, using a call-and-answer motif between the bass and guitar, described by Drowned in Sound as "the oldest trick in the book".

== Reception ==
Upon both of its releases, "Giddy Stratospheres" received positive reviews from music critics. On its initial release in 2004, Drowned in Sound were critical of its lo-fidelity recording but remarked it was "well worth pushing through the initial barrier of the recording quality to get at the song underneath."

In its 2006 review of Someone to Drive You Home, The Observer gave the song a positive review, writing that "'Giddy Stratospheres' sees Jackson dispatch acid sentiments about a 'boring' love rival in an accent that could cut glass." These sentiments were echoed by Fraser McAlpine from BBC Radio 1 who gave the song a 4-stars review describing "shards of guitar and shrieks so sharp they could have someone's eye out. "

A review by Yahoo was mixed, saying that the song stretched Jackson's voice "to its grating limits" but praised lyricist Dorian, describe his narrative-led song writing "as compelling as anything on (Arctic Monkeys') Whatever People Say I Am That's What I'm Not".

== 2004 track listing ==
All lyrics written by Dorian Cox, music by The Long Blondes.

- 7-inch single
1. Side A "Giddy Stratospheres"
2. Side B "Polly"
3. Side B "Darts"

== 2007 track listing ==
All lyrics written by Dorian Cox, music by the Long Blondes.

- CD
1. Track 1 "Giddy Stratospheres"
2. Track 2 "All Bar One Girls"
- 7-inch
1. Side A "Giddy Stratospheres"
2. Side B "I'm Coping"
- 7-inch
1. Side A "Giddy Stratospheres"
2. Side B "Never to Be Repeated"
