= Kate Jackson (singer) =

English singer (born 1979)

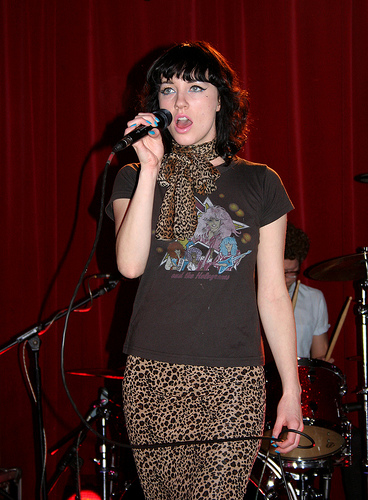
- Jackson performing with The Long Blondes at the Razzmatazz Pop Bar, Barcelona, late 2006

Background information
- Born: 16 September 1979 (age 47)
- Genres: Art rock, indie rock, post-punk revival
- Occupations: Musician, artist
- Years active: 2003–present
- Label: Rough Trade
- Formerly of: The Long Blondes

Kate Jackson (born 16 September 1979) is an English singer and artist who was formerly the lead-singer with The Long Blondes. She now performs under the name Kate Jackson & The Wrong Moves.

== Biography ==
Jackson attended Culford School in Bury St Edmunds, Suffolk and took leading parts in the school's performing arts shows. In the late 1990s, she moved to Sheffield to study English and History. Soon after graduating, Jackson began writing and performing with fellow graduates of the city's universities forming The Long Blondes. Whilst the band were unsigned, she studied fine art and also worked at Freshman's Boutique, a vintage clothing shop in Sheffield. This interest in vintage clothing became a distinctive feature of the image of The Long Blondes. Jackson herself describes her style as "Bonnie Parker meets a Carry On girl".

In 2006, Jackson was ranked number seven in NME's Cool List. Despite the number one spot being given to Beth Ditto, of The Gossip, and the 2006 list being equally divided between male and female performers, Jackson responded to this accolade with: "They probably thought they didn't have enough girls. It was so overrun with boring boys, they needed someone to bring a touch of glamour." The NME described her as having the "arrogant strut of Chrissie Hynde and the acidic tongue of a [Charles] Dickens heroine."

Jackson is a passionate spokeswoman for Sheffield. In an article in The Observer, she spoke about a project initiated by the magazine Go called Cooling the Towers which proposed lighting up the former cooling towers at Tinsley to symbolise what Sheffield stands for, rather than demolishing them. "One suggestion was that the towers would light up as cars passed on the M1, one a tower of red lights and one a tower of white. Go Sheffo petitioned the city council with these suggested uses but met with mute response". The towers were demolished in 2008.

An archive photo from Jackson's time in The Long Blondes features on the front of Guy Mankowski's book, Albion's Secret History: Snapshots of England's Pop Rebels and Outsiders, published by Zer0 Books in 2021.

== Solo career ==
After The Long Blondes split in October 2008, Jackson began working a solo record with former Suede guitarist Bernard Butler. Songs included are "Velvet Sofa From No.26", "16 Years" and "Dancing In My Bedroom". In March 2010, she published the track "Homeward Bound" on her Myspace page.

Jackson was a guest singer on the Scottish band 1990s' Kickstrasse, on their Kicks album of March 2009. In 2011 she formed the eponymous Kate Jackson Group performing a small number of gigs including a homecoming of sorts to second home of Sheffield at the city's Plug venue. Later in 2011 double A side single "The Atlantic"/"Wonder Feeling" was released, initially on limited edition vinyl followed by iTunes download in January 2012.

In 2015 Jackson was performing in two bands: The Wrong Moves and The Wilsons. In 2016, her debut album British Road Movies, a collaboration between Jackson and Butler, was released to positive reviews, holding a 76% approval rating on Metacritic.

== Visual art career ==
Jackson told NME in September 2015 that she had begun a career as a visual artist, explaining that art had been her "first choice of career" prior to the formation of The Long Blondes. She cites Andy Warhol, Jeffrey Smart and Paul Catherall as influences, and her work focuses mainly on motorways and transport infrastructure.
