= Young Love =

Young Love may refer to:

== Comics ==
- Young Love (comic), a 1949–1977 romance comic created by Joe Simon and Jack Kirby

== Film, radio, television and theater ==
- Young Love, a 1987 Israeli/German film, the seventh in the Lemon Popsicle franchise
- Young Love, a 2001 Finnish film featuring Sari Havas
- Young Love (radio series), a 1949 radio situation comedy
- Young Love, a 1974 TV pilot starring Meredith Baxter
- Young Love (TV series), a 2023 animated spin-off series of the 2019 animated short Hair Love
- Young Love (play), a 1928 Broadway play starring Dorothy Gish

== Music ==
- Young Love (band), a 2005–2009 American electronic rock band

=== Albums ===
- Young Love (Connie Smith and Nat Stuckey album), 1969
- Young Love (Mat Kearney album), 2011
- Young Love (J. Williams album), 2009
- Young Love (Jedward album) or the title song (see below), 2012
- Young Love, by Southern All Stars, 1996
- Young Love, by the Tide, or the title song, 2017
- Young Love EP, by Young Love, 2006
- Young Love, an EP by HALO, 2015

=== Songs ===
- "Young Love" (1956 song), written by Ric Cartey and Carole Joyner, popularized by Sonny James, Tab Hunter, the Crew-Cuts, Lesley Gore, and Donny Osmond
- "Young Love" (Air Supply song), 1982
- "Young Love" (Janet Jackson song), 1982
- "Young Love" (Jedward song), 2012
- "Young Love" (Kip Moore song), 2013
- "Young Love" (Mystery Jets song), 2008
- "Young Love (Strong Love)", by the Judds, 1989
- "Young Love", by Carter's Chord, 2008
- "Young Love", by Chris Brown from Chris Brown, 2005
- "Young Love", by Gavin DeGraw from Free, 2009
- "Young Love", by Nikki Yanofsky from Solid Gold, 2016

== See also ==
- Young Lust (disambiguation)
