= Two Doors Down (Mystery Jets song) =

Single by Mystery Jets

from the album Twenty One
- Released: 2 June 2008
- Genre: Indie pop
- Label: 679 Recordings
- Songwriters: Kai Fish, Henry Harrison, Blaine Harrison, William Rees, Kapil Trivedi
- Producer: Erol Alkan

Mystery Jets singles chronology
"Young Love" (2008)	"Two Doors Down" (2008)	"Half in Love With Elizabeth" (2008)

"Two Doors Down" is a single by the British indie rock band Mystery Jets from their second album Twenty One and it features a saxophone solo by Nik Carter (of The Blackjack Horns). The single became their second highest-charting single in the UK Singles Chart, peaking at number 24, second to "The Boy Who Ran Away" which charted one place higher at number 23. In October 2011, NME placed it at number 100 on its list "150 Best Tracks of the Past 15 Years".

== Reviews ==
Musicomh gave a positive review saying that "With the help of Erol Alkan they convey this in sweeping, romantic gestures that wouldn't have been out of place in the charts in the 1980s - yet thanks to the producers's intervention sound bang up to date" and went on to say "With a melody that won't be leaving your brain for some time, this is one of the Jets' poppiest offering yet, given a dash of camp attitude to complete a memorable single".

Neumagazine gave the song 9 out of 10 stars. They said that it is "A homage to the 80s, rather than a piss-take, the light hearted synths and classic 'love story lyrics' make this a very fun track" and went on to say "It's the kind of nostalgia we actually like. The video is a rather enjoyable as well".

== Music video ==
The tone of the song's promotional video is light-hearted with members of the band wearing 1980s-style clothing and dancing against fluorescent backdrops. Two female dancers also appear throughout the video.

== Track listing ==
This is the track listing for the single:

1. "Two Doors Down"
2. "Man in the Corner"

== Chart performance ==
The song debuted in the UK Singles Chart at number 87. After six weeks, it had risen to number 24, where it became their second highest-charting song, as well as only their fourth UK top-40 single. In total it spent eight weeks in the chart, a record for the band.

=== Weekly charts ===
Chart (2008)	Peak position
UK Singles (OCC)	24

== Certifications ==
Region	Certification	Certified units/sales
United Kingdom (BPI)	Silver	200,000^{‡}
^{‡} Sales+streaming figures based on certification alone.

== "Garlic Bread (I Think I'm in Love)" ==
On 18 December 2020, professional British competitive eater and YouTuber Beard Meats Food (Adam Moran), joined the race for the Christmas number one and released a charity record with profits being donated to the Stroke Association. The single "Garlic Bread (I Think I'm in Love)" was a parody version of "Two Doors Down", re-recorded with lyrics on a food based theme. The song reached No. 10 on the UK Singles Sales Chart.
