= Blaine Harrison =

English musician (born 1985)

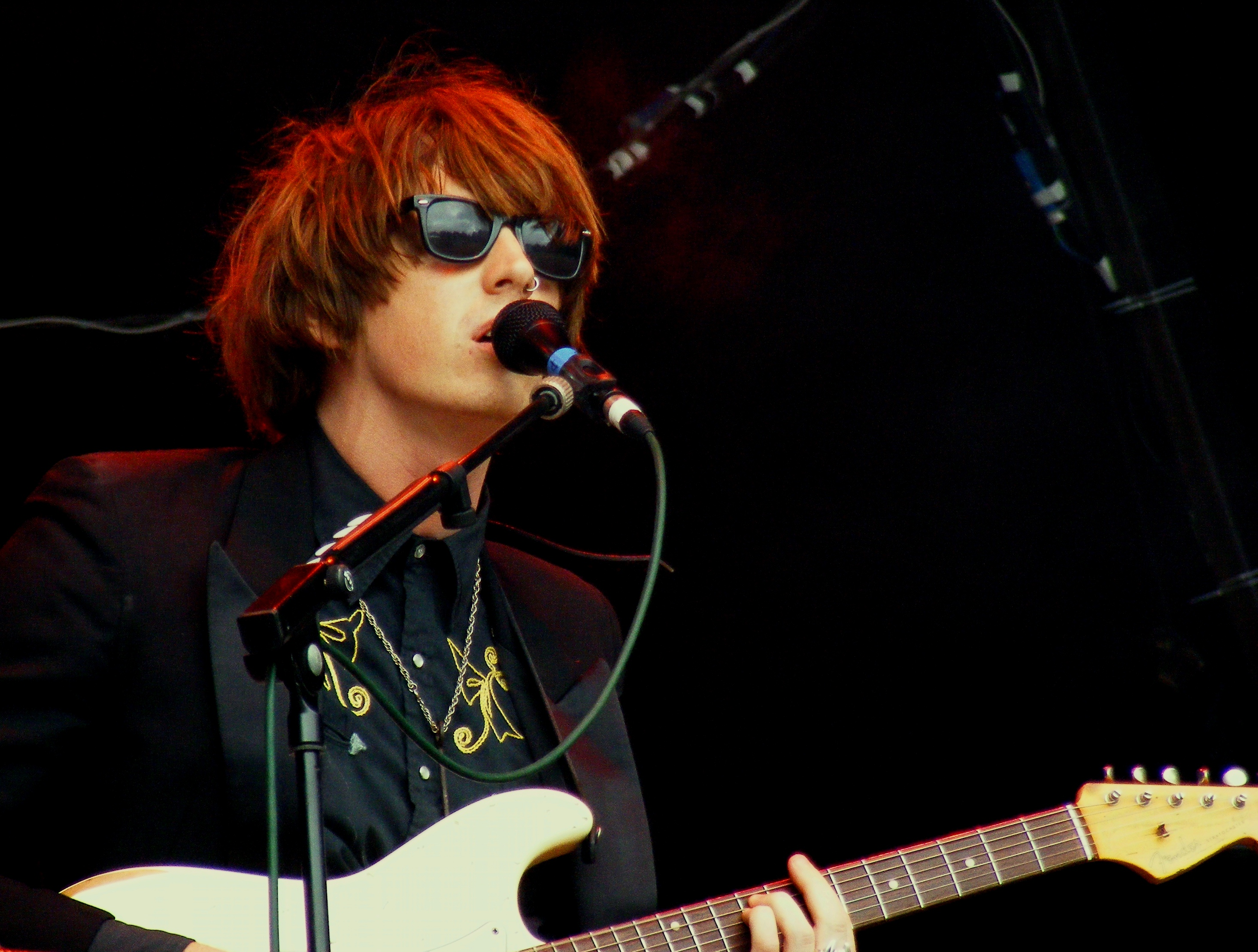
- Harrison performing with Mystery Jets at Bingley Music Live in 2011

Background information
- Born: Stephen Blaine Harrison; 23 May 1985 (age 41); Hammersmith, London, England
- Genres: Indie rock, post-punk revival, indie pop, psychedelic rock
- Occupations: Musician, songwriter
- Instruments: vocals, guitar, piano, percussion
- Years active: 1994–present
- Label: Rough Trade
- Website: Official website

Blaine Harrison (born Stephen Blaine Harrison on 23 May 1985) is an English musician and songwriter best known as the lead vocalist of the indie rock band Mystery Jets.

== Early life ==
Harrison started playing instruments as a child. He experimented with drumming at the age of eight, as well as guitar and piano later on. In his early teens, he listened to progressive rock instead of the commercial garage music preferred by his peers. His father, Henry William Cope Harrison, is a former architect and designer. Blaine Harrison's mother, Helen Harrison, is a former maths teacher and lives in the southwest of France. He also has a sister Dymphna Harrison, a designer.

Harrison cites his inability to speak French during the years he spent in France as an important influence on his creativity: "At the time I found it quite difficult being so out of the loop, but looking back, it was the best thing that ever happened to me. It taught me to use my imagination. I made music because I couldn't speak the language".

== Mystery Jets ==
Mystery Jets were first based on Eel Pie Island in Twickenham, London in 2004. The band started with Harrison, his father Henry, and his best friend William when the boys were at school. The current line-up includes Harrison (lead vocals, keyboards, guitar), William Rees (guitar, vocals), Jack Flanagan (bass), Kapil Trivedi (drums), and Henry Harrison (lyrics) Henry was a full-time member until moving to a background role during the recording of the band's second album, "Twenty One". Mystery Jets has released five studio albums, Making Dens (2006), Twenty One (2008), Serotonin (2010), Radlands (2012) and Curve of the Earth (2016). A further album, Zootime (2007) was released as a US only compilation to introduce the band to an American audience. The band divide their time between working at home in London and touring internationally.

== Personal life ==
Harrison's personal life has affected the band's sound a lot; he has cited his turbulent relationship with his first girlfriend as the inspiration behind songs such as "Flakes" and "Behind the Bunhouse" on the album Twenty One. Harrison also has a close relationship with his father, Henry, who introduced him to music as a child and supported his musical career, despite his physical obstacles. He has said his father's role is more like an older brother's protectiveness and that there would be no Mystery Jets without him. Henry was named "18th coolest person in rock" by NME in 2005.

=== Disability ===
Harrison was born with the disability spina bifida, which has affected his leg muscles since he was a child.

In 2008 Mystery Jets were forced to pull out of Several UK and European festivals due to Harrison getting ill. He apologised to his fans in a letter on Mystery Jets' Myspace blog.

In September 2019 the band were forced to postpone the imminent release of their new album and their tour, when Harrison was again hospitalised.
