= Cruiserweight =

Cruiserweight may refer to:

- Cruiserweight (boxing), a weight class in boxing between light heavyweight and heavyweight
- Cruiserweight (MMA), a weight class in mixed martial arts with an upper weight limit at 225 pounds (102 kg).
- Cruiserweight (professional wrestling), a wrestler weighing below heavyweight
- Cruiserweight (band), an American rock band from Austin, Texas
