= Casimir (band) =

English alternative band

- Origin: Wells, Somerset
- Genres: Alternative, indie rock, post-rock
- Years active: 2012—present
- Label: Fear Of Fiction
- Members: Mark Juggins (vocals, guitar); Joey 'The Smell' Edwards (guitar); Jed Hampson (bass); Max Doobhan (drums)
- Past members: George Ruddle-Hellier (guitar, vocals) Graham Moffat (drums)
- Website: www.casimirband.com

Casimir are an alternative band from Bristol, England. Formed between school friends George Ruddle-Hellier, Jed Hampson and Joey Edwards, Casimir went through various lineup changes before becoming fully active in 2012, releasing 'Lucid' on the Fear Of Fiction FOF008 compilation vinyl. On 23 January 2013 their video for 'Balancing Act' was premiered on NME.com, taken from their debut EP 'Not Mathematics'.

== Biography ==
On 23 June 2012, Casimir's track "Lucid" was featured on the Fear Of Fiction released compilation vinyl, gaining comparisons to bands such as Interpol, Mystery Jets, and We Are Scientists. Their debut video was premiered on NME.com January 2013, in order to promote the release of debut EP 'Not Mathematics'. This was shortly followed by release of singles 'Like Whistles' and a rerecorded 'Lucid', in February and March respectively.

== Discography ==
=== Extended plays ===
Title	Details
Not Mathematics	Released: 4 March 2013; Label: Fear Of Fiction; Format: CD, Digital download
