= A Billion Heartbeats =

Studio album by Mystery Jets
- Released: 3 April 2020
- Genre: Alternative, indie rock
- Length: 48:10
- Label: Caroline International
- Producer: Blaine Harrison, Matthew Twaites, Mystery Jets

Mystery Jets chronology
Curve of the Earth (2016)	A Billion Heartbeats (2020)	A Hole to See the Sky Through (2026)

Singles from A Billion Heartbeats
- 1. "Hospital Radio" Released: 8 July 2019; 2. "Screwdriver" Released: 5 August 2019; 3. "History Has Its Eyes on You" Released: 30 August 2019; 4. "Wrong Side of the Tracks" Released: 13 September 2019; 5. "Petty Drone" Released: 2020

A Billion Heartbeats is the sixth studio album by English indie rock band Mystery Jets. It was released on 3 April 2020.

== Background ==
The first single released from the album was "Hospital Radio" on 8 July 2019, and it was first played on Steve Lamacq's BBC Radio 6 Music show. The next single, "Screwdriver", was released on the 5 August 2019, alongside the announcement of the album name, tour dates and release date of 27 September 2019.

On 17 September 2019, the band announced the postponement of the album's release and tour due to the hospitalisation of singer Blaine Harrison. They announced the rescheduled album release date for the 3 April 2020, with the tour following in April–May.

The band were forced to reschedule the tour again to November–December 2020, due to the coronavirus pandemic, however the album release still went ahead as planned, but only digitally.

As a result of the postponed release, two EPs were released - Petty Drone and A Billion Heartbeats, each having all the released tracks up to that point.

== Critical reception ==
Professional ratings
Aggregate scores
Source	Rating
Metacritic	87/100
Review scores
Source	Rating
The Daily Telegraph	5/5 stars
DIY	4.5/5 stars
The Independent	4/5 stars
The Line of Best Fit	9/10
musicOMH	4.5/5 stars
NME	4/5 stars

A Billion Heartbeats received positive reviews from contemporary music critics. At Metacritic, which assigns a normalised rating out of 100 to reviews from mainstream critics, the album received an average score of 87, based on seven reviews, indicating "universal acclaim".

Most critics were impressed with the rousing sound displayed on the record; Neil McCormick of The Daily Telegraph praised the anthemic and intention sound of the album, stating that: "This is the sound of a group breaking out of their shell and demanding to be heard." DIY Magazine reviewer Elly Watson agreed, calling the album a "rallying call for change and action", whilst also positing that the record will become an "undoubtedly influential album." Alice Jenner of The Line of Best Fit echoed these calls, suggesting that "it's not a far stretch from their already established sound" but retains a sound which is "slightly heavier and a bit more raw in places".

== Track listing ==
All tracks are written by Mystery Jets.

A Billion Heartbeats track listing
No.	Title	Length
1.	"Screwdriver"	5:23
2.	"Petty Drone"	4:45
3.	"History Has Its Eyes on You"	3:54
4.	"A Billion Heartbeats"	4:56
5.	"Endless City"	3:56
6.	"Hospital Radio"	6:03
7.	"Cenotaph"	5:11
8.	"Campfire Song"	4:27
9.	"Watching Yourself Slowly Disappear"	4:58
10.	"Wrong Side of the Tracks"	4:37
Total length:		48:10

== Personnel ==
Mystery Jets

- Blaine Harrison – vocals, keyboards, guitar
- Kapil Trivedi – drums
- Jack Flanagan – bass
- William Rees – guitar, vocals

== Charts ==
Chart performance for A Billion Heartbeats
Chart (2020)	Peak position
Scottish Albums (OCC)	30
UK Albums (OCC)	85
