= The Artificial Heart =

- Origin: Austin, Texas
- Genres: Rock, Post-Punk
- Years active: 2005–present
- Formerly of: The Impossibles
- Members: Rory Phillips; Craig Tweedy; Scott Clapsaddle; Andrew Collins; Santiago Vela
- Past members: Jess McGress; Grant W. Anderson
- Website: Official website

The Artificial Heart is an Austin, Texas-based band featuring Rory Phillips and Craig Tweedy, both formerly of The Impossibles. It also featured guitarist Scott Clapsaddle, vocalist Andrew Collins, and drummer Santiago "Jimmy" Vela III.

== History ==
The band's beginnings can be traced as far back as 2004, when Rory begin the project Nineteen Ninety-Now with Scott Clappsaddle. The short lived project produced the song "Love Won't Be Enough", which has since become part of The Artificial Heart's live shows. Phillips rejoined with The Impossibles bassist Craig Tweedy and the band changed their name. The band name began as Rory and the Artificial Heart, but has since been shortened to just The Artificial Heart.

Rory and the Artificial Heart began posting songs on their Myspace page in the spring of 2006. Phillips has produced all of the band's material and the early demo recordings were recorded on his own. They played their first official show on June 10, 2006 at Emo's in Austin, TX. At the time of the first show Jess McGress played keyboards, Grant W Anderson played drums, Craig Tweedy played bass, Scott Clapsaddle played guitar, and Rory Phillips played guitar and vocals. Other members have included Devon Orr (keys, vocals), Santiago "Jimmy" Vela III (drums), and Andrew Collins (keys, vocals).

The band has shared the stage with Samiam, Sparta, Jim Ward, and Recover. The band has used the internet to gain a national audience. Using their Myspace page, the band has posted versions of every song that will be on their debut. The band's self-titled debut was released digitally May 12, 2009 and re-released on vinyl in August 2010.

== The Artificial Heart album ==
1. Again, With Feeling 2:32
2. No Way Out 2:49
3. Don't Turn Away 3:19
4. Self Esteem 3:25
5. Overcome 3:34
6. Let It Go 3:37
7. Hello Mother, Hello Father 3:51
8. Cold Cold Day 3:26
9. Love Won't Be Enough 4:04
10. Meantime 4:27
11. Hope 3:38
12. False Positives 4:41

== Non-album songs ==
- "Little White Lie"
- "Faking a Feeling"
- "Blood Keeps on Bleeding"
- "No Way Out" (demo)
- "We Shall Overcome" (demo)
- "Cold, Cold Day" (demo)
- "Love Won't Be Enough" (demo)
- "Meantime" (demo)
- "Hope" (demo)
- "False Positives" (demo)
