= Recover (band) =

American rock band

- Origin: Austin, Texas, United States
- Genres: Post-hardcore; hard rock; emo; alternative rock; pop punk; indie rock
- Years active: 2000–2005; 2009–present
- Labels: Fueled by Ramen; Fiddler; Universal; Animal Manufacturing Co.
- Past members: Dan Keyes; Robert Mann; Ross Tweedy; Santiago Vela III

Recover is an American rock band from Austin, Texas.

== History ==
Recover is a post-hardcore band composed of Dan Keyes (guitar/vocals), Robert Mann (guitar/vocals), Ross Tweedy (bass), and Santiago "Jimmy" Vela III (drums). The band recorded a four-song demo in the spring of 2000. The demo found its way to Fueled by Ramen Records via the band's friends in fellow Austin band The Impossibles. The band later released their debut album, Rodeo & Picasso, in the summer of 2001.

The band toured extensively in support of the album, and in 2002, released a follow-up EP on Fiddler Records, Ceci n'est pas recover. The band continued an exhaustive touring schedule with bands such as Jimmy Eat World, AFI, The Get Up Kids, Braid, Thrice, My Chemical Romance, Thursday, Taking Back Sunday and Coheed and Cambria. The band would eventually sign to Universal imprint Strummer Recordings, alongside The Rapture and The Mars Volta in late 2002.

In summer 2003, the band retreated to Austin Texas to write their second full-length, This May Be The Year I Disappear, with help from producer Rory Phillips, a process that would take eight months due to recording setbacks. The band later recorded material with Linkin Park producer Don Gilmore at NRG Studios in Los Angeles, but according to the band's label the recordings weren't up to par and the band headed back to Texas to proceed recording with Rory Phillips. Mixed by Andy Wallace, This May Be the Year I Disappear was released in October 2004.

The band embarked on a co-headlining tour with Armor for Sleep and Say Anything in early 2005. Later that year, the band suddenly went on hiatus, citing Keyes' desire to move to New York and start a new project.

In 2007 Recover announced they would be playing their first show in two years for the Everyone Knows Everyone music festival in Austin, Texas on June 30, 2007 at Emo's.

After reforming with Keyes' Young Love in early 2009, the band announced that they had officially reunited and would perform several more shows in California, New York, New Jersey, Massachusetts and Texas.

In December 2016, the band was billed at Margin Walker's Sound On Sound festival, which subsequently rained out resulting in a surprise performance at Austin's The Mohawk, their first performance in 5 years.

== Current projects ==
By 2005, Dan Keyes relocated to New York and new dance-rock project, Young Love, was signed to Island Records. The band released an EP in 2006 and their debut full-length Too Young to Fight It in early 2007. Robert Mann is credited on the album and on tour with the band as well as Ross Tweedy performing live on bass. Santiago Vela III joined the band for their second album, One of Us, released in April 2009 on Island Records. Vela also spent a brief period with The Impossibles.

In October 2011, The Sword announced Santiago Vela III as their permanent drummer.

In 2012, Robert Mann joined Hector's Pets, based in Brooklyn, New York, releasing a self-titled 7-inch on Burger City Rock n' Roll in 2013, and a full-length album, Pet-o-feelia, on Oops Baby Records.

In 2016, Dan Keyes formed Cologne, based in Los Angeles, California. In 2016, Mann debuted a new project, Bob Mann & The Rolling Thunder, based in Brooklyn, New York.

== Discography ==
=== Albums ===
Year	Title	Label	Producer
2001	Rodeo & Picasso	Fueled by Ramen	Rory Phillips
2002	Ceci n'est pas recover	Fiddler Records	Brian McTernan
2004	This May Be the Year I Disappear	Universal Records	Rory Phillips
2013	Challenger	Animal Manufacturing Co.	Rory Phillips

Challenger, a collection of B-sides recorded with Rory Phillips in Austin, Texas, was officially released in July 2013 on Animal Manufacturing Co. on clear 180-gram vinyl. On July 26, 2011, The Segues from Rodeo & Picasso was posted via Fueled By Ramen's website. It was a collection of 13 tracks of original studio recordings of the segues recorded for their debut album, Rodeo & Picasso. In June 2013, the band announced a forthcoming re-release of Ceci n'est pas recover on 10" vinyl, through Animal Manufacturing Co. in partnership with Fadeaway Records.

=== Compilations ===
- Not One Light Red: A Desert Extended (Sunset Alliance 2002)

Song: Betting All I Have

- Atticus: ...Dragging the Lake, Vol. 3 (Side One Dummy 2004)

Song: Cigarette

- Plea For Peace: Take Action, Volume 2 (Sub City 2002)

Song: Rodeo

- New. Old. Rare.: Midtown, Blueline Medic, Recover, Silent Corporation (split) (Fueled By Ramen 2003)

Songs: Fracture, Not A Word, Unnatural

- In Honor: A Compilation to Beat Cancer (Vagrant Records 2004)

Song: Don't Ask, Don't Tell
