= Young in Love (disambiguation) =

Young in Love is a 2024 album by Kita Alexander.

Young in Love may also refer to:

- Young in Love, 1996 album by Aaron Pritchett
- "Young in Love", 2016 song by Borgeous featuring Karmin
- "Young in Love", song by Chung Ha from the 2019 EP Flourishing
- "Young in Love", 2003 B-side to "2nd Amendment" by Easyworld
- "Young in Love", song by Jaden Smith from the 2020 mixtape CTV3: Cool Tape Vol. 3
- "Young in Love", song by Medina from the 2016 album We Survive
- "Young in Love", 2014 song by Thelma Plum

== Other uses ==
- "Love" (Lana Del Rey song) (original title "Young in Love"), 2017
- April Love (original working title Young in Love), 1957 American musical film directed by Henry Levin

== See also ==
- In Love (disambiguation)
- Young Love (disambiguation)
