= Beard Meats Food =

English competitive eater and YouTuber (born 1985)

BeardMeatsFood
- Born: Adam Moran; 8 July 1985 (age 41); Leeds, England
- Occupation: Competitive eater

YouTube information
- Channel: BeardMeatsFood
- Years active: 2015–present
- Genre: Competitive eating
- Subscribers: 6.79 million
- Views: 2.5 billion
- Last updated: 8 August 2026

Adam Moran (born 8 July 1985), better known as BeardMeatsFood, is an English competitive eater and YouTuber from Leeds. As of February 2024, Major League Eating ranks him the top competitive eater from Europe, and number 17 in the world. He holds several food-related records. He is also a musician and has released several food-related parody songs that appeared on the UK music charts.

== Career ==
=== Nathan's Famous Hot Dog Eating Contest results ===
2023 Contest	26	11th place
2022 Contest	28	T-11th place
2019 Contest	28.5	T-10th place

Moran is a former banker, and a Yorkshireman from Leeds. He is a qualified personal trainer and says that competitive eating together with two hours' weight training per day has improved his body fat ratio over five years. He did his first eating challenge around 2014-2015 as a follow-up to a diet where he got his body fat down to 8%; and he began competing professionally in 2017. In 2016, he was given a position as food tester by the owner of an American-style diner chain in Yorkshire, who took out £1 million in insurance on his stomach and tastebuds. He competed in the Nathan's Hot Dog Eating Contest three times with his best showing in 2019 when placed 10th and ate 28.5 HDB.

Moran started his YouTube channel in 2015, posting videos of himself attempting food challenges. By 2018 he had 300,000 YouTube subscribers with his videos receiving a total of 41 million views, which allowed him to leave his job in finance and concentrate on his channel full-time. The number of subscribers to his YouTube channel has reached 6 million as of January 2026, with over 2.1 billion total video views. Each video received millions of views, many within a day of release.

== Food challenges ==
Moran's YouTube channel generally features him travelling around the United Kingdom and elsewhere in Europe, as well as to North America and Asia, visiting restaurants and other establishments that offer food challenges and attempting to complete those challenges. Moran prepares for his challenge on the day by drinking around 4 litres of water in a minute to stretch his stomach without filling it up, but not drinking more since the practice can be dangerous in excess and result in death. Other strategies include eating protein before carbs (such as bread) to avoid the carbs absorbing water, eating as fast as possible in the first ten minutes, and limiting the amount of chewing.

In his videos, Moran frequently chats with the other patrons and staff, often apologising for his messy eating. He has a second "table cam" camera facing away from himself to record the reactions. In the final edit he often provides a sarcastic voiceover commentary track, sometimes including an excited gibberish exclamation that resembles "Let's get it!". He has stated it "isn't a word... it's just a nonsensical yet energetic way of announcing the beginning of the commentary". He has admitted a dislike towards mushrooms, Brussels sprouts, and spicy food. He often gets Diet Coke or a root beer with his meals, saying the carbonation of the soft drink helps getting some of the trapped air out of the stomach, and the sweetness helps break up the monotony of the savoury flavour. Despite the size of the challenges, he often orders a dessert once he has finished "as a bit of a gag".

== Other media ==
=== Podcast ===
Moran co-hosts the "Breaking Beard" podcast with Josh Gudgeon. This podcast is also available on YouTube in video format.

=== Christmas singles ===
Starting in 2020, Moran has released a song every December, in most of which a pop-punk song's lyrics are rewritten with a food theme. All the proceeds are donated to the Stroke Association, which was chosen due to his father's death from a stroke. A music video is made for each of these songs, produced by his friend and Breaking Beard Podcast co-host Josh Gudgeon, who has also appeared in videos on the BeardMeatsFood YouTube channel. As of 2024, he stated his songs had made enough money to donate £20,000 to the Stroke Association.

- 2020 – "Garlic Bread (I Think I'm in Love)", a parody of Mystery Jets' 2008 indie song "Two Doors Down".
- 2021 – "I Want Chicken Wings", a parody of "I'd Do Anything" by the Canadian pop-punk band Simple Plan.
- 2022 – "I Got Cheesecake", a parody of "Ghosts Over Calvary" by the English band Creeper. The song is a duet with Adam's sister Jenna, who sometimes appears in his videos as "Sister Beard".
- 2023 – "Grab the Money Pies", a parody of "Sirens" by the UK band My Awesome Compilation. At the time, Moran stated he wanted to stop making the songs, but felt compelled to do so after the popularity of "I Got Cheesecake" and the money it generated for charity.
- 2024 – "Apple Pie", an original pop-punk song, intended to be humorous.
- 2025 – "Sweet Little Chippy Song", an original song. No full video released.

== Discography ==
=== Singles ===
Title	Year	Peak chart positions
Title	Year	UK Singles sales
"Garlic Bread (I Think I'm In Love)"	2020	10
"I Want Chicken Wings"	2021	17
"I Got Cheesecake"	2022	4
"Grab the Mince Pies"	2023	11
"Apple Pie"	2024	9
"Sweet Little Chippy Tea"	2025	10

== Episode list ==
Upload date	Title	Location	Restaurant	Challenge	Approx Weight of Food	Allotted time	Previous Record	Beard time	Win / Loss	Prize	Notes	YouTube Link
25 October 2026	THIS MONSTER MUNCH BOX CHALLENGE HAS ONLY BEEN BEATEN ONCE!	Nottingham, UK	Piggy's Gastro Grub	Mega Munch Box Challenge		30min	26:00	23:00	Won	The £30 meal is free	Two sandwiches of your choice, one wrap filled to their liking, a one and a half foot long sausage roll, a choice of two cookies from their cookie cabinet, one bag of crisps, one fizzy drink, two giant scotch eggs and one giant cheese mallet	
18 October 2026	I ORDERED HONG KONG'S FAMOUS REUBEN SANDWICH CHALLENGE!	Hong Kong	Morty's	Reuben sandwich challenge		30min	18:48	13:58	Won	The $570 HKD meal is free	1kg of pastrami, topped with sauerkraut, cheese and Russian dressing, stuffed into a sandwich and accompanied by 2lb of fries and six pickle spears	
11 October 2026	THIS PETROL STATION HAS AN UNBEATEN SPICY FOOD CHALLENGE... IT WAS BRUTAL!	West Yorkshire, UK	Pitstopp	The Pit Stop Monster Challenge		30 minutes		28:55	Won	The £50 meal is free, you get a £50 voucher to spend in house, a t-shirt, and a spot on the wall of fame	5 wings, 5 strips, kebab meat, a 26oz burger, a good 4lb of fries, all doused with their 'Dynamite Sauce' and accompanied by a milkshake of your choice!	
4 October 2026	PROBABLY THE WEIRDEST FOOD CHALLENGE IN CANADA	Montreal, Canada	La Belle Et La Boeuf	Epic Ladder Burger Challenge		One sitting		10:57	Won	A spot on the wall of fame and a bottle of Pepto	A huge burger, chocked full of beef patties, bacon, american cheese, brie, peanut butter and a fried KitKat	
27 September 2026	THIS PULP FICTION THEMED DINER HAS A FOOD CHALLENGE WHICH HAS NEVER BEEN BEATEN!	Liverpool, UK	Sin City Social	The Seven Deadly Sins Challenge		45min	Never been beaten	31:55	Won	The £49.95 meal is free	A fat mac burger, buffalo butch, Korean BBQ chicken tenders, po-po loaded fries, mozzarella stick, chicken wings, and a deluxe shake	
20 September 2026	I ATTEMPTED 'THE JOHN CANDY STEAK CHALLENGE' AT A PACKED RESTAURANT IN CANADA!	Charlottetown, PEI. Canada	Hunter's Ale House	John Candy Challenge		60min		28:44	Won	The $84.99 meal is free and you get a hoodie	72oz steak, some vegetables and two baked potatoes	
28 June 2026	THIS HUGE MEDIEVAL BANQUET CHALLENGE HAS NEVER BEEN BEATEN SOLO!	Quebec City, Quebec, Canada	La Chope Gobeline	Duel de la Rapière		One sitting	Never been beaten	43:45	Won	Free "Honorable goinfre" mug, free dagger	3 beef skewers, 1 small chicken, pork loin, 3 large sausages, "brie en croûte d’épices", sides of onions, peppers mushrooms, potatoes, greens and pearl barley	
28 December 2025	THE TOUGHEST FRY UP CHALLENGE I'VE DONE IN YEARS...NO WONDER IT'S NEVER BEEN BEATEN	Rotherham, UK	Scran	If You're Hard Enough Challenge		One sitting	Never been beaten	38:31	Won	Free if you win, otherwise £40	15 scran sausages, 15 bacon, 15 fried eggs, 10 hash browns, 5 black pudding, beans, tomatoes, mushrooms, 5 grilled tomatoes, 4 toast	
8 December 2025	I TRIED THE FAMOUS 'GIGA PIZZA CHALLENGE’ IN THE CZECH REPUBLIC!	Pilsen, Czechia	Pizza Doma	Giga Pizza Challenge		60 minutes		24:50	Won	Free if you win, otherwise CZK781, spot on the wall of fame	60cm fried egg pizza, cheesecake for dessert.	
1 December 2025	I ORDERED THAT RED HOT CURRY CHALLENGE IN SINGAPORE THAT HASN'T BEEN BEATEN YET!	Yishun, Singapore	Jian Zao Ipoh Curry Noodle	Singapore's Biggest Bowl of Curry Mee		30 minutes		23:12	Won	Free if you win, otherwise $49.90 SGD	Huge bowl of yellow noodles, roast meat, char siew, pork skin, long bean, tau pok, prawn, abalone, cockles with grandma's special curry broth and topped with 8 fried tofu skins, plus a 325ml can of 100plus.	
24 November 2025	REDDIT SAID EVEN I COULDN'T BEAT THIS BREAKFAST CHALLENGE!	Stoke-on-Trent, UK	Westport Lake Cafe	Westport Lake Cafe's Monster Breakfast Challenge		30 minutes		23:28	Won	Free if you win (otherwise £25), winner's T-shirt, spot on the wall of fame.	6 rashers of bacon, 6 sausages, 6 eggs, 2 large scoops of mushrooms, one bowl of beans, one bowl of canned tomatoes, one bowl of tater tots, 6 huge slices of black pudding, 6 slices of toast and 6 large oatcakes, plus a large latte. Brownie cheesecake for dessert.	
17 November 2025	THIS SPICY CHALLENGE WITH 'INFERNO WINGS' HASN'T BEEN BEATEN YET!	Northallerton, North Yorkshire	The Koop	Big Gravy Challenge		30 minutes		21:49	Won	Free if you win (otherwise £30), winner's T-shirt	Huge tray of poutine, topped with signature fried chicken, chillies, blue cheese and spicy buffalo sauce, 2 corn cobs, 6 chicken wings coated in Inferno sauce.	
10 November 2025	NOBODY HAS MANAGED TO CONQUER THIS PUB PLATTER CHALLENGE DESPITE 18 ATTEMPTS!	Southport, UK	The Hungry Monk	Hungriest Monk Challenge		30 minutes		26:34	Won	Free if you win (otherwise £34.95), winner's T-shirt	"Salt & chilli loaded fries, gourmet hot dog, Frank's hot chicken wings, mac & cheese, onion rings and a huge double beef and chicken burger with bacon and cheese, smothered in monk's burger sauce", plus a 15oz glass of Diet Coke. Biscoff cheesecake for dessert.	
3 November 2025	FINISH THE MASSIVE FRIED RICE CHALLENGE AT THIS MARKET IN SINGAPORE AND WIN $100!	Yishun, Singapore	Ah Ma Taste	Ah Ma Fried Rice Challenge	2.5kg	30 minutes		26:54	Won	Free if you win, otherwise $50 SGD	2.5kg of fried rice, 3 fried eggs, pork floss.	
26 October 2025	I ORDERED THE HOTDOG CHALLENGE THAT NOBODY COULD BEAT AT A CAFE IN WALES!	Towyn, Wales	The Seagull Cafe	Hotdog Challenge		30 minutes		28:00	Won	Free if you win (£25 otherwise); winner's T-shirt	Six hot dogs with onions; two corn on the cobs; bowl of coleslaw; bowl of beans; large milkshake (chocolate). Carrot cake for dessert.	
19 October 2025	THIS HUGE SANDWICH CHALLENGE IN SINGAPORE COSTS $190 IF YOU LOSE!	Lor Kilat, Singapore	Breakfast Grill	Breakfast Sandwich Challenge	~7.5 lbs.	30 minutes		28:51	Won	Free if you win ($190 SGD otherwise); winner's T-shirt; spot on wall of fame	Seven sandwiches (kimchi, scrambled egg/spam/bacon bits/American cheddar, unagi with eel, beer-battered halibut with nacho cheese, chili beef, fried chicken with scrambled egg, surf and turf with Wagyu beef); choice of two sides (spicy pasta, shoestring fries)	
12 October 2025	WIN $100 CASH IF YOU CAN FINISH THIS JUMBO NOODLE CHALLENGE IN 15 MINUTES!	Singapore	Obba Jiajang	Jumbo Jajangmyeon Challenge		15 minutes		11:45	Won	$100 SGD prize if you win (pay $58 SGD if you lose); photo on Wall of Fame	Bowl of jajangmyeon black bean noodles with chungjang, pork, and vegetables; honeydew Melona for dessert	
5 October 2025	THIS BURGER CHALLENGE IN AMSTERDAM HAS NEVER BEEN BEATEN!	Amsterdam, Netherlands	Coco's Outback	Coco's Outback Burger Challenge	~3 pound burger	30 minutes		20:18	Won	Free if you win; winner's T-shirt	Burger (three giant patties, jalapeños, sun-dried tomatoes, oud Dutch cheese); side of fries; side of coleslaw; bitterballen	
28 September 2025	ONLY 4% OF PEOPLE CAN BEAT THIS BREAKFAST CHALLENGE IN NEW YORK!	Schuylerville, NY	Mama Bear's Diner	The General		30 minutes		20:39	Won	Winner's T-shirt; signature on winner board	Two eggs; toast (cinnamon raisin); home fries; choice of meat; stack of two large pancakes; large juice or milk (milk). Carrot cake for dessert.	
21 September 2025	I ORDERED A CHICKEN DIPPER CHALLENGE WHICH HAS NEVER BEEN CONQUERED!	Wellingborough, England	The Pumphouse	The Big Dipper Challenge		15 minutes		12:52	Won	Free if you win (£15 otherwise); spot on the wall of fame	There is a 30 minute solo version but Adam did this one with @KatinaEatsKilos	
14 September 2025	THE FOUR FOOT BURRITO CHALLENGE SO BIG THAT NOBODY HAS EVER FINISHED IT!	Globe, AZ	Gila Hog's BBQ	Bomb Burrito 45 Min. Challenge		45 minutes		45 minutes	Lost	Refund if you win ($100); winner's T-shirt	4' long burrito filled with choice of meat (pulled pork), choice of cheese (cheddar) and mac & cheese. He managed to eat ¾ of it.	
7 September 2025	THIS SPICY CURRY BANQUET CHALLENGE HAS NEVER BEEN BEATEN!	Warrington, England	Lal Sher (located inside the pub Ye Olde Red Lion; the name is Hindi for "red lion")	Eat It All Challenge		30 minutes		25:55.88	Won	Free if you win (£35 otherwise); champ's hooded jumper; photo on Wall of Fame	2 papadams; chutney tray & lime pickle; 3 seekh kebabs; 4 pieces chicken tikka; 2 shahi tokra lamb strips; 1 order peri chips; 1 "monster nan bread" (regular chosen; garlic also available); ½ portion medium curry; ½ portion hot curry; 1 order pilau rice; pint of lager or soft drink (Diet Coke chosen) + sticky toffee pudding for dessert	
31 August 2025	I ATTEMPTED A 20 YEAR OLD BREAKFAST CHALLENGE IN A SHACK IN NEW YORK!	Syracuse, NY	Mother's Cupboard Diner and Fish Fry	"The Whole" Frittata Challenge	~6 lbs.	no time limit, but must be finished in one sitting		20:20.78	Won	photo on Wall of Fame; winner's T-shirt	Frittata (sausage, peppers, home fries, eggs, broccoli, pepperoni); two thick slices of toast; no dessert this time	
24 August 2025	THE 'GRAVEYARD BURGER' CHALLENGE HAS BEEN FAILED OVER 500 TIMES!	Schenectady, NY	Wagon Train BBQ	Graveyard Burger Challenge	5 1/2 lbs.	30min	15:51	14:26.86	Won	Free if you win ($70.20 otherwise); signature on Wall of Fame plaque; winner's T-shirt	Graveyard Burger (beef patty (ordered blue rare), pulled pork, brisket, bacon, mac and cheese, jalapeños and coleslaw) with sides of fries and onion rings + banana cream pie for dessert	
17 August 2025	"HE'S NOT GONNA MAKE IT!"...ATTEMPTING A HUGE BREAKFAST CHALLENGE AT A BUSY NY DINER!	Syracuse, NY	Second Chance Diner	Eddie's Breakfast Challenge	5 lbs.	30min		18:17.67	Won	Free if you win ($49.99 otherwise); photo on Wall of Fame; winner's T-shirt (they gave him two)	"3 huge pancakes, Texas French toast [3 pieces], 4 sausage, 4 ham, 4 bacon, homefries and 5 scrambled eggs" on a tray, with 16-oz. beverage (cranberry juice) + deep-fried peanut butter and jelly sandwiches for dessert (was served four and gave one away to another diner)	
10 August 2025	THIS NEW YORK DELI SANDWICH CHALLENGE HAS BEEN ATTEMPTED 200 TIMES!	Buffalo, NY	Jonny C's NY Deli & Caterers	Big Mouth Challenge	4.5 lbs.	30min		11:34.19	Won	Free if you win ($40 otherwise); photo on Wall of Fame; Big Mouth T-shirt	The Big Mouth sandwich (1 lb. corned beef, 1 lb. pastrami, 1 lb. turkey, ¼ lb. Swiss cheese and Russian dressing on 4 slices of rye bread and a couple of pickle wedges) + peanut butter brownie for dessert	
3 August 2025	THIS HUGE ITALIAN EATING CHALLENGE HAS ONLY BEEN BEATEN TWICE IN TEN YEARS!	Newfane, NY	Cafora's Pizza and Pastaria	Chubby Ponzone Challenge	6 lbs.	30min		25:49.07	Won	$20 gift certificate; photo on Wall of Fame; T-shirt	Chubby Ponzone, a large flatbread filled with meatballs, Italian sausage, fried eggplant, grilled steak (not mentioned in the menu listing for the challenge, but it's an option for a standard panzone, and a staffer mentions it), onions, peppers, tomato sauce and mozzarella cheese + a cannoli for dessert	
27 July 2025	THE BEST HOT DOG CHALLENGE I'VE EVER DONE...BREAK THE HOUSE RECORD AND IT'S FREE!	London, Ontario	Frank & Furters	Hot Dog Challenge		90min	12 hot dogs (set by Darrien Thomas)	13 hot dogs in 29:32.41	Won	Only pay if you lose (unknown, but presumably the hot dogs' individual prices); plaque on Wall of Fame; challenger's T-shirt; baseball cap	13 hot dogs with various toppings (including two with none, but he put ketchup on them); side order (tater tots) + deep fried Oreos for dessert	
20 July 2025	THE HARDEST STEAK CHALLENGE I'VE DONE IN YEARS!	Yeovil, UK	Texas Rocks	Steak Challenge		60min		38:23.12	Won	Cost refunded if you win (£80) on a voucher (given to another patron with a beard); Star of Fame placement plaque; a hot pink Stetson; Jack Daniels merchandise.	75-ounce steak (well done—to make it easier to eat); three double sides (chilli cheese fries, mac & cheese, creamy garlic mushrooms) + brownie tart for dessert	
13 July 2025	I ORDERED THE GIANT PHO CHALLENGE AT FLORIDA'S FAMOUS BLACK AND WHITE RESTAURANT!	Orlando, FL	Twenty Pho Hour	24 Bowl Challenge		1 hour		19:41.67	Won	T-shirt; plushie; stickers; pins; name added on one of the drawings on the walls	A large bowl of pho (beef broth, rice noodles, brisket, beef shin, 3 fried eggs, fried onion, fried garlic, onions, cilantro, lime) + funnel fries for dessert.	
6 July 2025	THIS PIZZA CHALLENGE IN FLORIDA HAS ONLY BEEN BEATEN ONCE!	Deltona, FL	Crustini Pizza & Cuisine	Pizza Challenge		28 minutes by two people (joined by Wayne Algenio)	22 minutes	12:54.43	Won	Only pay if you lose (price not given); Wall of Fame placement; $50 voucher	A 28" pizza with choice of toppings (BMF & Wayne chose pepperoni and pineapple, which Crustini later added to their menu as Beard Meats Food "Salty & Sweet") + tiramisu (BMF) and cheesecake (Wayne) for dessert	
29 June 2025	I ATTEMPTED THAT VIRAL DONER KEBAB CHALLENGE IN GERMANY!	Augsburg, Germany	Ali Baba Kebaphaus	Größten Döner Deutschlands	2 kg	30 minutes		20:05:12	Won	Only pay if you lose (€45); T-shirt that the staff had custom made for BMF; €50 voucher	A 2 kg chicken doner; three cups of ayran (with more brought out to dunk the bread in) + baklava and kerhane tatlısı for dessert	
22 June 2025	"THAT'S OBSCENE"...THE 'MONSTER BURRITO' CHALLENGE HAS BEEN AROUND FOR A DECADE!	Tavares, FL	Eduardo's Lokos Tacos	Monster Burrito Challenge	6 lb.	30 minutes		16:35.99	Won	Only pay if you lose ($45); Wall of Fame placement; champion T-shirt	A 6 lb. burrito with choice of protein ("ground beef - less chewing") and lettuce, guacamole, pico de gallo and sour cream on the side + deep fried ice cream for dessert	
15 June 2025	YOU ONLY GET TEN MINUTES TO FINISH THE LAS VEGAS 'MEGA SLICE' CHALLENGE!	Las Vegas, NV	Pizza Pie Guy (part of Molly's Tavern)	Mega Slice Challenge	~3 lb.	10 minutes		08:09.62	Won	$25 gift certificate	3 lb. slice of pizza with choice of toppings (he chose cheese) and choice of carbonated drink (root beer) + a large cookie from a nearby bakery for dessert (he bought four of them).	
8 June 2025	I TRIED TO BEAT LONDON'S FAMOUS BOTTOMLESS LASAGNA RECORD!	Shoreditch, London, England	Senza Fondo!	Bottomless lasagna	~1 lb. per portion	None given	8 portions	41:57.16 (11 portions)	Won	Senza Fondo! T-shirt	Beef lasagna (artichoke also available) + tiramisu for dessert	
1 June 2025	THE BEST STEAK CHALLENGE I'VE EVER ATTEMPTED!	Titusville, FL	Durango's Steakhouse	Oak Fire Grill Challenge	40 oz. steak	None given, but must be finished in one sitting		16:21.63	Won	Wall of Fame placement; Durango's mug (which entitles the winner to 99¢ beers on Wednesdays)	40 oz. steak (medium rare), two sides (baked potato and broccoli w/ carrots), small loaf of bread w/ maple butter + key lime cheesecake for dessert	
25 May 2025	HUNDREDS HAVE FAILED THE SPICY 'STEEL CURTAIN' CHALLENGE OVER THE LAST DECADE!	Port Orange, FL	Giuseppe's Steel City Pizza	Steel Curtain Challenge		45 minutes		29:41.71	Won	Only pay if you lose ($85); Wall of Fame placement; swag bag with T-shirt, baseball cap "and some other goodies"	"The Pittsburgher" Extreme sandwich; order of fries; 5 chicken wings of choice (signature "Steel City" sauce); 5 signature extra-hot wings; side of sweet and spicy pickles; choice of cheesecake ("Fat Elvis"); choice of 24 oz. drink (Arnold Palmer with sweet tea + emergency tumbler of milk) + another slice of cheesecake for dessert	
18 May 2025	THIS BURGER CHALLENGE IN BELGIUM HAS ONLY BEEN BEATEN ONCE!	Brussels, Belgium	Huggys	Huggys Challenge Burger		1 hour	25 minutes (by Randy Santel)	20:52:00	Won	Only pay if you lose (€52); winner's T-shirt ("It always seems impossible until it's done"—Nelson Mandela)	Huggys Challenge Burger; sides of fries and coleslaw; water; soft drink (cola?) + unidentified dessert	
11 May 2025	ONLY 20 MINUTES TO FINISH FLORIDA'S FAMOUS 'FAT BOY' CHALLENGE IN A PACKED DINER!	Punta Gorda, FL	John Ski's House of Breakfast and Lunch	The Fat Boy Challenge		20 minutes		14:20.03	Won	Pay only half price if you win ($30 normally); Wall of Fame placement; winner's T-shirt	Two Fat Boy Breakfasts (XL order of country potatoes topped with a sausage patty, three strips of bacon, and three eggs cooked any style smothered with sausage gravy and topped with shredded cheddar cheese); mug of orange juice; mug of milk + an Oatmeal Creme Pie from a gas station for dessert (to allow the line at HoB to move)	
4 May 2025	CAN I BREAK THE RECORD ON AMSTERDAM'S ALL YOU CAN EAT PANCAKE BOAT?!	Amsterdam, the Netherlands	De Pannenkoekenboot ("The Pancake Boat")	Try to beat the record number of pancakes eaten during the 75-minute cruise		75 minutes	21 pancakes	22 pancakes	Won	Acknowledgement from the tour guide	Pancakes with various toppings (broke the rule about only getting one at a time, but no one called him on it)	
23 March 2025	ATTEMPTING THE BIGGEST EATING CHALLENGE IN BELGIUM...IT'S TOUGH!	Bree, Belgium	Frituur 't Vol Bekske	McTongerlo Burger Challenge		4 hours		43:20:10	Won	A spot on their wall of fame. You don't get the meal free, but you do get another McTongerlo burger, to be redeemed whenever you like	A huge burger chocked full of beef patties, bacon, boiled eggs, pineapple and all manner of veggies	
16 March 2025	HE TOUGHEST BURGER CHALLENGE I'VE DONE IN YEARS...YOU GET A PLAQUE IF YOU WIN!	Las Vegas, NV	Sickies Garage	Victory Lap Challenge		60min		42:38.52	Won	The $50 meal is free, you get a t-shirt, and a plaque on their wall of fame.	A towering burger, chocked full of beef patties, bacon, cheese and pickles, sandwiched between grilled cheese buns and accompanied by a veritable mountain of fries	
9 March 2025	I ORDERED AMERICA'S OLDEST PANCAKE CHALLENGE AT A PACKED DINER IN ARIZONA!	Prescott, AZ	Zeke's Eatin' Place	Zeke's Wagon Wheel Pancake Challenge		20min		12:19.76	Won	The $14 meal is free and you get a t-shirt.	Eat three of their huge 'Wagon Wheel' pancakes	
2 March 2025	DRUNK GUY BETS BAR STAFF I'LL BREAK THE RECORD ON THIS CORNDOG CHALLENGE IN ARIZONA	Scottsdale, AZ	Giligin's	20 corndog challenge		60min	14:14	13:07.39	Won	The $40 meal is free and you get a $50 bar tab.	Eat 20 of their corndogs, accompanied by optional dips.	
23 February 2025	THE FOOD CHALLENGE THAT ROY KEANE ATTEMPTED...IT MADE HIM ANGRY	Worcester, UK	Harry Ramsden's	Fish 'n chip platter challenge		30min		20:47.07	Won	The £36 meal is free.	Eat a huge platter of chips, battered fish, deep fried sausages, chicken balls, mushy peas, pickles and an assortment of condiments.	
16 February 2025	THE RECORD ON THIS 24 EGG OMELETTE CHALLENGE HAS STOOD FOR ALMOST A DECADE!	Tucson, AZ	Old Times Kafe	Giant Omelette Challenge		60min	38min	20:48.07	Won	The $32.50 meal is free and a spot on the wall of fame.	24 eggs, one meat of your choice, one vegetable of your choice and one cheese of your choice, served on a bed of lettuce and accompanied by three servings of hash browns and three servings of toast	
9 February 2025	THIS GIANT CORNISH PASTY CHALLENGE IN PHOENIX HAS ONLY BEEN BEATEN FOUR TIMES!	Phoenix, AZ	Sonson's Pasty Co.	5 lb Pasty Challenge		60min		19:12.62	Won	The $50 meal is free, you get a mug, and a spot on the board of fame.	A giant Cornish pasty, containing beef, onions, swede and potatoes	
2 February 2025	WIN $100 CASH IF YOU CAN FINISH THIS GIANT TORTA CHALLENGE IN LAS VEGAS	Las Vegas, NV	La Vecindad	Super Torta Cubana Challenge		23min		Unfinished	Lost	The $50 meal is free, and you get $100 cash.	A humongous cuban sandwich chocked full of chicken, beef, breaded beef, chorizo, sausage, bacon, ham, cheese, eggs, lettuce, tomatoes, onions, pickles	
26 January 2025	THAT VIRAL $100 MILKSHAKE & DONUTS CHALLENGE IN LAS VEGAS!	Las Vegas, NV	Duck Donuts	100oz Shake Challenge		20min		12:40.08	Won	The $100 shake is free.	A 100oz milkshake of their choice, topped with 4 donuts.	
19 January 2025	I TRIED TO EAT THE BIGGEST PIZZA IN LAS VEGAS...SUPER MARIO'S 45" PIZZA CHALLENGE!	Las Vegas, NV	Super Mario's Pizza's	45" 'King Pizza Challenge'		60min	Never completed	48:36.83	Won	The $100 meal is free.	Teams of two try to finish a 45 x 24 inch pizza, topped with cheese with any additional toppings desired (but are not mandatory). Teammate is 'Vegas Heavy D'.	
12 January 2025	I ORDERED 'THE MONSTER OMELET CHALLENGE' AT A PACKED RESTAURANT IN LAS VEGAS	Henderson, NV	The Original Omelet House	The Monster Omelet Challenge		60min		28:16.11	Won	The $34 meal is free and a t-shirt.	A 6 lb omelet chocked full of pretty much everything in their kitchen	
5 January 2025	THIS DINER ON ROUTE 66 IS FAMOUS FOR THEIR 'MONSTER BURGER' CHALLENGE!	Kingman, AZ	Mr D'z Route 66 Diner	Monster Burger Challenge		One Sitting		28:05.94	Won	A t-shirt.	A 4 lb monster burger, accompanied by some sides and a shake	
29 December 2024	I ATTEMPTED THAT HUGE VIRAL PANCAKE CHALLENGE...WHICH HAS NEVER BEEN BEATEN!	Frankfurt, Germany	Cafe Buur	Giant Pancake Skillet Challenge		One Sitting	Not yet completed	31:15	Won	A t-shirt and a bottle of red and white wine.	A giant pancake, topped with strawberries and 10 scoops of ice cream and a giant syringe of Nutella.	
15 December 2024	"EVERY THING IN THE KITCHEN IS IN THERE!"...MICHIGAN'S BRUNCH MOUNTAIN CHALLENGE	Columbiaville, MI	The Falcons Nest	Falconator Challenge		45min	19:37	14:06.03	Won	The $30 meal is free, a t-shirt, and a spot on the wall of fame.	A huge stack of beef patties, sausage patties, bacon, eggs, cheese, covered in peanut butter, accompanied by fries, onion rings and crisps.	
8 December 2024	I ATTEMPTED THE MOST FAMOUS EATING CHALLENGE IN CHICAGO...IT'S HARD!	Chicago, IL	Lucky's Sandwich Company	Triple Sandwich Challenge		60min		35:34.35	Won	The meal is free and you get a spot on their wall of fame.	Eat any three of the sandwiches on the menu	
1 December 2024	THIS 10LB SHEPHERD'S PIE CHALLENGE IN MILWAUKEE HAS BEEN FAILED OVER 200 TIMES!	Milwaukee, WI	Mulligan's Irish Pub & Grill	Mulligan's Shepherd's Pie Challenge		60min		25:52.93	Won	The $45 meal is free, you get a t-shirt, a spot on their wall of fame and a $50 git card.	2 lb portions of shepherd's pie formed into a big pile, topped with carrot, onions, a boat load of Guinness gravy and the best part of a loaf of marble rye bread	
28 November 2024	IN CHICAGO THEY HAVE THE WEIRDEST PIZZA CHALLENGE I'VE EVER DONE	Chicago, IL	Nonna's Good Life Pizza	Giant Slice Challenge		30min		9:24.31	Won	The $16 meal is free and a t-shirt.	2 large slices of pizza	
24 November 2024	BARTENDER DOUBTS I CAN FINISH THEIR PANZAROTTI CHALLENGE!	Winfield, IL	Caliendo's	Panzarotti Challenge		30min		25:20.15	Won	The $30 meal is free and a t-shirt.	A massive folded pizza full of sausage, pepperoni, ham, bacon, onions, sauce and of course, plenty of cheese	
17 November 2024	I TRIED A FOOD CHALLENGE IN A PACKED SUPERMARKET WHICH HAS NEVER BEEN BEATEN!	Dersingham, UK	Spar Supermarket	The Sparticus Challenge		20min	Never completed	17:22	Won	The £20 meal is free.	A huge baguette stuffed with all manner of breakfast favourites and topped with cheese	
10 November 2024	ONLY 13 MINUTES TO BEAT THE CURRENT CHAMP...THE DIRTY THIRTY DONUT CHALLENGE!	Worcestershire, UK	Dirty D's	Dirty Dozen Challenge		60min	13:43	12:42.54	Won	The £30 meal is free and a spot on the wall of fame.	12 artisan donuts and a milkshake	
3 November 2024	WIN $50 CASH IF YOU CAN FINISH THIS GIANT MEATBALL SUB IN CHICAGO!	Chicago, IL	Fontano's Subs	3 ft Meatball Sandwich Challenge		60min		19:24.31	Won	The $40 meal is free and you get a t-shirt and $50.	A 7 lb meatball sub, accompanied with cheese and plenty of marinara	
27 October 2024	YOU WIN A HUGE TROPHY IF YOU FINISH THIS FOOD CHALLENGE IN A BOWLING ALLEY!	Rockford, IL	Shooter's Bar at Don Carter Lanes	Big Porker Challenge		30min		20:52.98	Won	The $18 meal is free. You get a coupon for two hours of bowling for a party of six, a t-shirt, a spot on the wall of fame, and an engraved trophy.	A huge deep fried pork tenderloin, topped with cheese, pickles and sausage gravy, on a ridiculously over the top bed of crinkle cut fries	
20 October 2024	THIS EATING CHALLENGE IS SO BIG IT'S ONLY BEEN BEATEN TWICE!	Portage, IL	Long Island Cafe	Amber's Breakfast Challenge		60min		44:14.07	Won	The $40 meal is free and a t-shirt.	a massive omelette, filled with about a pound of bacon, two large servings of hash browns, potatoes, cheese, onions, sausage gravy, toast and accompanied by two massive pancakes	
20 October 2024	THIS EATING CHALLENGE IS SO BIG IT'S ONLY BEEN BEATEN TWICE!	Portage, IL	Long Island Cafe	Amber's Breakfast Challenge		60min		44:14.07	Won	The $40 meal is free and a t-shirt.	A massive omelette, filled with about a pound of bacon, two large servings of hash browns, potatoes, cheese, onions, sausage gravy, toast and accompanied by two massive pancakes	
17 October 2024	TRYING TO BREAK PADDY THE BADDY'S WING EATING RECORD...AND PADDY TURNS UP!	Liverpool, UK	Furasato Bar & Grill	Wing Eating Challenge		90in	47 Wings	60 Wings	Won	The wings are free, a t-shirt, and your name at the top of the leaderboard.	Eat a portion of wings (5 count) then order the next.	
13 October 2024	I ORDERED THE GIANT CORNED BEEF SANDWICH CHALLENGE AT A 'HAUNTED' IRISH PUB	St Clair, MI	Murphy's Inn	The Big Burger Challenge		60min	17min	15:24.20	Won	The $30 meal is free, a t-shirt, and a spot on the wall of fame.	3 lb of meat (in this case a large beef patty and mountains of corned beef) topped with sauerkraut and thousand island dressing, sandwiched in an oversized toasted bun	
6 October 2024	WIN THE CASH JACKPOT IF YOU FINISH THIS UNBEATEN BREAKFAST CHALLENGE FAST ENOUGH!	Leeds, UK	The Cosy Cabin Cafe	The Breakfast Challenge		30min	Never completed	21:58.03	Won	The £30 meal is free and £30 cash.	4 sausage, 4 bacon, 4 spam, 4 black pudding, 4 eggs, 4 hash browns, 4 toast, 2 fried bread, 1 large beans, 1 large tomatoe, 1 large mushroom, 1 chips	
29 September 2024	EAT FREE FOR A MONTH IF YOU CAN BEAT THIS GIANT BURGER CHALLENGE IN AUSTRIA!	Pöchlarn, Austria	Johnny's Burgers	Johnny's XXL Burger Challenge		60min	21:53	19:32	Won	The €50 meal is free, a trophy, a goodie bag, a t-shirt, a framed spot on their wall of fame and free food and drink for the month	A 1.2 kg beef patty, topped with the usual fixings and sandwiched between a huge bespoke bun	
22 September 2024	THIS CHALLENGE HAS BEEN AROUND 15 YEARS AND THEY SERVE IT IN A TRASH CAN LID!	Fairmont, WV	The Poky Dot	He-Man Breakfast Challenge		45min		22:50.51	Won	The $30 meal is free and a t-shirt	A huge trash lid full of bacon, sausage, eggs, biscuits and gravy, potatoes, toast, ham, links and four giant pancakes	
15 September 2024	THE CHALLENGE I'VE WAITED TEN YEARS TO ATTEMPT!	West Chester, OH	Tom & Chee	The Baker's Dozen Challenge		10min		7:14.30	Won	The $50 meal is free and a t-shirt	Thirteen grilled cheese donuts, all of which must be eaten, with the aid of only one 24oz drink	
8 September 2024	YOU ONLY GET 30 MINUTES TO FINISH THIS GIANT DELI SANDWICH CHALLENGE IN MICHIGAN!	Saginaw, MI	Tony of Shields	The Giant Deli Grinder Challenge		30min		27:32.63	Won	The $30 meal is free and a t-shirt. a cap, and a spot on the wall of fame	A huge sandwich chocked full of turkey, beef, bacon, two types of cheese, lettuce, tomatoes, pickles, onions, a mountain of fries covered in gravy and two shakes	
1 September 2024	THIS COOKIES & MILK CHALLENGE HAS ONLY BEEN DEFEATED ONCE!	Saginaw, MI	Heidi's Darn Good Cookies	Cookies and Milk Challenge		25min	17:21	14:50.62	Won	The $30 meal is free, a t-shirt, a cap, and a spot on the wall of fame, and a dozon cookies to take home	One of every cookie on their menu (12 total) plus a 14oz bottle of milk	
25 August 2024	ONLY TEN MINUTES TO BREAK THE CHAMP'S RECORD AND STUN THE LOCALS!	Colon, MI	Dawn's Cafe's	Breakfast Platter Challenge		30min	11:31	9:45.39	Won	The $30 meal is free, a t-shirt, and a spot on the wall	A six egg omelette filled with one meat and two veggies, topped with cheese, some hash browns, four biscuits topped with some rich white gravy, two pancakes and a glass of milk	
18 August 2024	ATTEMPTING THE 'MOUNT NACHEESMO' CHALLENGE FROM MAN V. FOOD!	Ann Arbor, MI	Tio's	Mount Nacheesmo Challenge		45min		28:12.51	Won	The $60 meal is free, a t-shirt, and a spot on the wall	5 lb of nachos topped with chicken, beef, carnitas, guacamole, sour cream, tomatoes, peppers, onions, refried beans	
11 August 2024	I ORDERED 'THE WOLVERINE CHALLENGE' IN A PACKED RESTAURANT IN CLEVELAND!	Cleveland, OH	Rise & Dine Cafe	Wolverine Challenge		30min		19:03.11	Won	The $20 meal is free and a t-shirt.	A humongous omelette chocked full of sausage, bacon, cheese, veggies. Accompanied by a pile of home fries and a side of toast	
29 May 2017	Beard's All American Cheat Day	Raleigh, NC	The Flying Biscuit Café; Rise Southern Biscuits & Righteous Chicken; The Cheesecake Factory; Wendy's; hotel room (food bought at Target)	Eat a bunch of food not normally found in the UK	16,729 calories	1 day			Not a challenge.		Flying: Lg biscuit with gravy and applesauce; 2 chicken sausage patties, scrambled eggs, grits, bacon, French toast with sweet cream cheese and raspberry sauce; 4 reg biscuits and gravy; two "breakfast tacos" (cheesy scrambled eggs, candied bacon and sauce in a folded pancake); fried potatoes; coffee. Rise: Donuts (1 each)--bacon and maple; apple fritter; unidentified (topped with blueberries). Factory: Bruléed French toast with bacon; 1 slice Oreo Dream Extreme cheesecake; 1 slice Adam's Peanut Butter Cup Fudge Ripple cheesecake; Oreo milkshake; soft drink. Wendy's: Baconator burger; lg fries; lg soft drink. Target: 4 Smucker's Uncrustables peanut butter and grape jelly sandwiches; ~10 Hostess Donettes mini-donuts (didn't finish the bag); half a tub of Edy's peanut butter cup frozen custard; also bought Pop Tarts, but didn't open them.	
23 May 2017	Hwy 55 World Burger Eating Championships! Feat. Nathan Figueroa & Wayne Algenio	Raleigh, NC	Hwy 55 Burgers, Shakes and Fries (contest held in Promo Court, Crabtree Valley Mall)	Hwy 55 World Hamburger Eating Championship	55 ounces of beef		Not given; beaten (1 min., 37 sec.) by returning champion Molly Schuyler		Lost	Trophy	Five Five Burger and crinkle fries. Adam's first professional contest.	
21 May 2017	The BIG ONE Pancake Challenge @ Big Ed's in Raleigh, NC (Trip To NC Pt.2)	Raleigh, NC	Big Ed's City Market Restaurant	The BIG ONE Pancake Challenge		45 minutes	7 minutes	7:27	Won		3 large pancakes	
14 May 2017	Anthony Joshua's HEAVYWEIGHT Daily Diet Challenge	Leeds, England	Home	Eat English heavyweight boxer Anthony Joshua's daily diet - in 30 minutes.	10 pounds (estimated); 5000 calories	30 minutes		28:18	Won		Breakfast: 4 eggs, scrambled (Anthony reportedly has them poached); 2 avocados; a serving of spinach; 3 slices toast; 1 lg fruit and oats smoothie; Lunch: Lg serving of pasta with tomato sauce; 2 chicken breasts; 1 bowl mixed fruit with yogurt, nuts and granola, and honey; Dinner: Serving of rice topped with quinoa; 1 baked potato; 2 mackerel fillets; 1 lg glass orange juice; 1 slice apple pie; 1 Cadbury Dairy Milk chocolate bar; 1 protein shake. (There was another drink on the table he neither indicated nor drank.)	
10 May 2017	The Triple Chilli (sic) Challenge & My First All Pro Contest	Leeds, England	MEATliquor	The Triple Chilli Challenge - A bit of speed eating practice for a forthcoming professional competition in America		10 minutes	"Just under three minutes"	04:37	Won	Only pay if you lose.	1 chilli burger; 1 chilli dog; 1 portion (one pound) of chilli fries plus 1 lg coffee and 1 portion poached eggs for breakfast and unidentified dessert	
28 April 2017	The 50,000 Calorie Challenge	Leeds, England	Home + McDonald's, Burger King, My Cookie Dough, Five Guys, Huckleberry's American Diner; Chiquito	Eat 50,000 calories in 50 hours to commemorate 50,000 subscribers	Totals: 52,911 calories; 1,230g protein; 4,863g carbs; 2,799g fat; 48,583 sodium (cost: £182.77)	50 hours		48:14:00	Won		11 meals: 1. The Rock's Cheat Meal - 4 pizzas; 12 chocolate chip pancakes; 21 brownies w/ peanut butter; Ben & Jerry's milkshake; 2. 4 assorted Cinnabons (mail-ordered in); 3. McDonald's breakfast - Double sausage and egg McMuffin; sausage, egg and cheese bagel; pancakes (3) and sausage (1 patty); 1 latte; 4. Burger King breakfast - 2 double sausage and egg Croissandwiches; 9 mini-pancakes; caramel and vanilla latte; 5. My Cookie Dough VIP Nutella; 6. Five Guys - 2 triple patty "all the way" bacon burgers; lg fries; 2 peanut butter, Oreo and bacon milkshakes; 7. Huckleberry's "Dirty Donut Burger" meal; lemon cheesecake milkshake; 8. 4 thick slices of French toast w/ syrup and cinnamon; 1 bowl dark chocolate granola cereal topped with broken Oreos and double cream; 1 coffee w/ double cream 9. 4 assorted grilled cheese donuts (including various sweet toppings, like Nutella); 1 bowl salted caramel granola cereal topped with broken Oreos and double cream; 1 glass juice; 10. 4 of "the smallest tacos in the universe" (pulled pork); 1 glass Diet Coke; 11. 1 bacon, peanut butter and blueberry jam sandwich; 1 lg slice carrot cake; 1 pint Ben & Jerry's What-a-lotta Chocolate; 1 tumbler of juice; plus one small bottle Diet Coke (while meeting with his mother).	
7 April 2017	Goldberg's INSANE Daily Diet Challenge	Home		Attempt to eat the same food (and same quantities) as pro wrestler Goldberg eats in one day	8,559 calories (589g protein, 748g carbohydrates, 357g fat)	1 hour		00:54:00	Won		Six meals: 1. 6 servings of oatmeal with blueberries and honey (in two large bowls); 2. 12 eggs (scrambled), 4 slices toast, 4 slices bacon, 1 avocado; 3. 2 all-meat pizzas; 4. 2 bowls of pho (1 shrimp, 1 chicken); 5. Beef tips, order of sweet potato fries, 1 avocado; 6. 1 bag popcorn; plus 4 protein shakes	
25 March 2017	The ENTIRE McDonald's Breakfast Menu Challenge	Home	McDonald's	Consume one each of the entire McDonald's UK breakfast menu	7,896 calories (316g protein, 823g carbohydrates, 304g fat)			00:41:47	Won		1 cheese & egg Snack Wrap; 1 bacon & egg Snack Wrap; 1 sausage & egg Snack Wrap; 1 egg & cheese McMuffin; 1 sausage & egg McMuffin; 1 bacon & egg McMuffin; 1 bacon roll (w/brown sauce); 1 breakfast wrap; 1 double sausage & egg McMuffin; 1 double bacon & egg McMuffin; 1 sausage, egg & cheese bagel; 1 bacon, egg & cheese bagel; 1 toasted bagel with (light) cream cheese; 1 hash brown; 1 order of pancakes (3) & sausage; 1 regular order of pancakes (4); 2 orders of oatmeal; 1 lg juice (not from McD's); 1 lg latte; 1 lg chocolate milkshake	
7 March 2017	The McMukbang (9,000 Calorie McDonald's Feast)	Home	McDonald's	Telling personal back story and eating	9048 Calories				Won		1 lg french fries, 1 Big Mac, 9 Chicken McNuggets (w/barbecue sauce dip), 3 Chicken Selects, 1 Quarter Pounder w/cheese, 1 lg Chicken Legend, 1 Filet-o-Fish, 1 Garlic Mayo Wrap, 1 Sweet Chili Wrap, 1 Happy Meal (w/Cheeseburger), 1 Bacon Clubhouse Double, 1 order of Mozzarella Dippers, 1 Apple Pie, 1 chocolate doughnut, 2 Oreo McFlurrys, 1 lg soft drink, 1 small soft drink, 1 lg banana milkshake, 1 lg strawberry milkshake	
25 February 2017	The 35,000 Calorie Cheat Day			Beat ErikTheElectrics 24 Hour Cheat Day record of 30,000.	36,647 calories	24 hours	30,000 calories		Won		1 lg Domino's stuffed crust meateor pizza, 2 grilled cheese donuts, 2 Ben and Jerry shakes, 2 bowls of granola, 2 cups of coffee (one twice as big as the other), double sausage & egg mcmuffin, sausage egg & cheese bagel, 3 pancakes, Egg Benedict, 3 hash browns, and a piece of bacon, double sausage croissantwich, glazed donut, caramel latte, red's BBQ donut burger, cornbread, frickles, fries, peanut butter pancakes and a Hershey's cookies n cream bar.	
4 February 2017	The 14,000 Calorie Super Bowl Game Day Feast	Home		Eat all the food while answering super bowl trivia questions.	14,000 calories			Unfinished	Lost		2 racks of ribs, 4 pulled pork sliders, 4 hot dogs, 1 lg pepperoni pizza, 25 chicken wings, stuffed potato skins, mozzarella dippers, pile of nachos, a tub of Ben & Jerrys spectacular specloos ice cream, a cookie pie and a can of coors light.	
24 December 2016	The 20,000 Calorie Christmas	Home		Watching Christmas movies and eating	20,000 calories	24 hours			Won		2 lg pizzas, cookies, garlic bread, coleslaw, and potato wedges from Dominoes. Pancakes with chocolate sauce and fruit, french toast with Brandy Butter, and assorted pastries. Christmas Turkey Dinner and lots of Christmas treats.	
15 December 2016	The Five Guys 10,000 Calorie Take Down	Home	Five Guys	The Five Guys 10,000 Calorie Take Down	9844 calories			00:26:34	Won		3 bacon cheeseburgers, 2 bacon cheese dogs, 2 grilled cheese, large Cajun fries, and 3 milkshakes with added bacon.	
24 November 2016	The 7 X Large Garlic Bread Eat off	Home		Garlic Bread Eat off vs. Mrs Beard	9 lbs			00:38:10	Won		Beard previously won a garlic knot eating contest with Mrs. Beard (fiancee Beard at the time) and got to name the house Beardingham Palace. The bet this time is how long they will wait to get married. Beard has to eat 5 faster than Lindsay's 2 in order to win.	
21 October 2016	The Every KFC Box Meal Challenge	Home		KFC Home Challenge	6040 calories			00:28:38	Won		1 Big Daddy Box, 1 Wicked Zinger Box, 1 Cheese and Bacon Box, 1 Fully Loaded Box, 1 Boneless Banquet Box, 5 diet Pepsis, and an Oreo Crusher. Beard also made the All Pro Eating world rankings - 6th place.	
6 October 2016	The Undefeated Ghost Chili Dog Challenge	(United Kingdom) Wakefield, West Yorkshire, UK	The Grill Pit	Dynamite Dog		00:30:00		00:24:30	Won		4 foot long hot dogs, 2 lbs of fries, and a milkshake. Spicy! Celebrating 10,000 followers.	
24 September 2016	The Caribbean Eat-a-thon (Beard's Vacation Pt 2)	Dominican Republic		Dominican Republic Holiday							Not a challenge - just Holiday eating. Beard mentions a TV appearance on ITV's Go For IT coming up.	
17 September 2016	The Holiday & The Biggest Burger I've Ever Seen! (Beard's Vacaion Pt. 1)	Dominican Republic	BRGRSPH	The Machete Burger	10 lbs			Unfinished	Lost	The waiter gave Beard a bottle of Champagne just for trying it solo.	This burger is typically served to groups of 6-8 people! Also, fries. Of course there are. The manager asked if Beard was an American because he was eating so much... Beard spent about a half hour eating most of the plate, but didn't finish the fries.	
7 September 2016	The Entire McDonald's UK SAVER MENU Challenge	Home		McDonalds Saver Menu	4200 calories	00:30:00		00:14:20	Won		1 of each item on the saver menu: Chicken BLC, Spicy Chicken Wrap, Cheeseburger, Double Cheeseburger, Chicken Mayo, Fries, 3 McFlurries, 2 sundaes, and 5 sodas.	
23 August 2016	The Undefeated 8 lb Chili Cheese Challenge & The UK's Second Biggest Freakshake	(United Kingdom) Yeadon, UK	Huckleberry's Diner	Dr Jekyll Freakshake		00:20:00		00:09:02	Won		One Gallon chocolate milkshake topped with a waffle, donuts and a slice of cheesecake	
23 August 2016	The Undefeated 8 lb Chili Cheese Challenge & The UK's Second Biggest Freakshake	(United Kingdom) Wakefield, West Yorkshire, UK	The Grill Pit	Chili Cheese Slider Challenge		00:30:00		00:18:31	Won		8 Chili Cheeseburgers, 2 lbs of fries, and a pint of Milkshake. Previously undefeated.	
11 August 2016	Britain's Biggest Freakshake - the MR HYDE Milkshake Challenge	(United Kingdom) Yeadon, UK	Huckleberry's Diner	MR HYDE Freakshake	10 lbs	00:20:00		00:14:28	Won		1 gallon bacon milkshake, topped with candied bacon and a GIANT pulled pork waffle burger. Beard is the first to try it - one week before its official restaurant debut.	
29 July 2016	Hunger Games 10 lb Undefeated BBQ Challenge	(United Kingdom) Flaxton, North Yorkshire, UK	Huckleberry's Diner	Hunger Games	10 lbs	1:00:00		00:51:23	Won	Only pay if you lose.	Ribs, chicken strips, waffle fries, mac n cheese, a three patty burger, pulled pork and bacon bits. Previously undefeated. Beard mentions a recent interview with "Chub Life." Tactical Diet Coke employed.	
21 July 2016	The 6 lb Breakfast, The Waffle Burger Freakshake & The Trip to London	(United Kingdom) Nottingham, UK	Rub Smokehouse	Dr Way Out West Burger / Shake		00:12:00	00:06:00	00:08:56	Won	Free T-Shirt, Wall of Fame	National Junk food day. The burger was on top of the milkshake. With waffles for buns. The milkshake is beer + Dr Pepper + milkshake.	
21 July 2016	The 6 lb Breakfast, The Waffle Burger Freakshake & The Trip to London	(United Kingdom) Leicester, UK	Jones' Cafe & Bistro	666 Breakfast Challenge	6 lbs	00:30:00	00:11:50	00:12:31	Won		Beard was travelling to London to film for an upcoming TV show. Apparently he did his own stunts! He did two eating challenges on the way home. This challenge had only been defeated 4 times previously. Record of 11:50 was set by Randy Santel.	
23 June 2016	The UK's Biggest Mixed Grill	(United Kingdom) Stockton-on-Tees, UK	The George Pub and Grill	Mixed Grill Challenge	10 lbs	00:45:00		00:17:45	Won	Free Hoodie	9,000 calories, previously undefeated. Burger, eggs, 2 steaks, onion rings, fries, ribs, chicken breasts, piri piri chicken, pulled pork, sausages, bacon, coleslaw, black pudding, mushrooms, peas, tomatoes, and gravy. Tactical Ice Cream was deployed. Battered Mars bar for dessert.	
20 June 2016	The Yorkshire Pudding Eating World Championships 2016	(United Kingdom) Yorkshire, UK		Yorkshire Pudding World Championship 2016		00:03:00	40 eaten in 3 minutes	35 eaten in 3 minutes	Won	Winner's Medal, Title of World Champion	Beard Defends the title!	
19 June 2016	5LB Parmo Challenge	(United Kingdom) Middlebrook, UK	Cafe Central Park	Parmo Challenge	5 lbs	00:45:00	00:11:57	00:19:05	Won	T-Shirt	Beard got engaged! Rematch for this challenge - lost 10 months ago. Parmo and a small side salad. Paul Lawton recently completed this challenge in 11 minutes and 57 seconds.	
9 June 2016	World Record Biggest English Breakfast Ever - The Kraken	(United Kingdom) Whitby, UK	Skipper's Cafe	The Kraken - World's Biggest English Breakfast	13 lbs			00:16:47		Free T-Shirt, Wall of Fame	2 person teams head to head. Beard and Paul Lawton vs Randy Santel and Magic Mitch from the USA. 13 lbs of food for each team.	
5 June 2016	Fish N Chip shop Platter Challenge	Home		Fish N Chips	10,000 Calories	1:00:00		00:41:21	Won		3 portions of fish and chips, 3 battered sausage, fish cake, fish sandwich, meat and potato pie, scampi, beans, gravy, mushy peas, curry sauce, and a pickled onion. With Bitter Shandy to wash it down. Celebrating national Fish N Chips day.	
21 May 2016	11LB Chicken N Waffles Challenge	(United Kingdom) Darlington, UK	Huckleberry's Diner	No Cluckin' Chance Challenge	11 lbs	00:40:00		Unfinished	Lost	Free Jersey	8 Waffles, 8 fried chicken breasts, corn on the cob, bacon, onion rings, pickles, onions, and 3 lbs of cheesy fries. This food event was used to promote the Grand Opening of the new Huckleberry's location. The challenge has been reduced in size (post Beard) to encourage participation. Smore's Galore for dessert.	
1 May 2016	The Italian Stallion Burger Challenge	(United Kingdom) Flaxton, North Yorkshire, UK	Huckleberry's Diner	Italian Stallion Challenge		00:40:00		00:10:29	Won	Free Meal	2 lb burger topped with chicken, pizza sauce, cheese, pepperoni, and veggies in a huge garlic focaccia loaf. With fries. Previously undefeated. Key Lime pie for dessert.	
26 April 2016	Huge BBQ Platter Challenge	(United Kingdom) Newcastle, UK	Longhorn's Barbecue Smokehouse	Breaking Badass Challenge	7+lbs	1:00:00		00:53:00	Won		12 chicken wings, full rack of ribs, sausages, brisket, 2 lbs of fries, coleslaw, 4 buns, 3 pots of beans, 1 pot of jalapenos, 5 strips of pork cracklin and lots of pulled pork. Repeat Challenge - tried in 2015, was filmed by a local news team. Previously Undefeated.	
15 March 2016	The Farmyard Burger Challenge	(United Kingdom) Wakefield, West Yorkshire, UK	The Grill Pit	Farmyard Burger Challenge		00:35:00		00:15:36	Won	Free Meal if you win, if you lose: pay £25 and get a spot on the wall of Shame.	Only defeated twice previously. 1 Beef, 1 lamb, 1 pork and 1 chicken patty topped with bacon, cheese, and veg. 2 cups of slaw and fries. Still room for dessert!	
12 March 2016	Undefeated Donut Ice Cream Mountain Challenge	(United Kingdom) Yeadon, UK	Huckleberry's Diner	Load of Dough Dessert Challenge		00:20:00		00:19:48	Won		15 fried glazed donuts, 20 scoops of ice cream, two cans of whipped cream, toppings and two sparklers. Previously Undefeated. 4K followers - new milestone.	
19 February 2016	Taking the Smoke BBQ Leeds Challenge Record Back	(United Kingdom) Leeds, UK	Smoke BBQ	Man V Food Burger Challenge		00:30:00	00:21:00	00:18:36	Won	£100 voucher for the restaurant if you set a new record.	Burger, Shake and Fries again. Repeat Challenge. Beard mentions an upcoming Guinness World Record challenge he is training for that is two weeks away.	
6 February 2016		(United Kingdom) Leeds, UK	My House Diner	20 Pancakes in 20 Minutes	7 lbs	00:20:00		00:18:41	Won		Previously Undefeated. Topped with syrup and ice cream. First use of tactical diet coke!	
23 January 2016	10 lb Cheesecake 2 man tag-team challenge	(United Kingdom) Flaxton, North Yorkshire, UK	Huckleberry's Diner	UK's Biggest Cheesecake	10 lbs	1:00:00		Unfinished	Lost		First two person challenge! Beard + rookie Johnathan. 10 lb peanut butter oreo cheesecake.	
10 January 2016	One Man vs 200 McDonald's Chicken Nuggets (3000 Subscriber World Record Attempt)	Home		Beat the World Record	8350 calories	1:00:00	150 chicken nuggets in 1 hour	155 eaten in 49 minutes	Won		Previous world record of 150 nuggets eaten in 1 hour, set by Naader "Freak Eater" Reda. BBQ sauce and Sweet Curry sauce - sweet curry sauce was almost puke inducing.	
19 December 2015	The Undefeated Philly Cheesesteak Challenge	(United Kingdom) Yeadon, UK	Huckleberry's Diner	Beard's Got Beef	7.5 lbs	00:40:00		00:39:57	Won		5 lb Cheese Steak sandwich with mushrooms and onions, with bonus 1 lb of chocolate ice cream and 2 pints of root beer. Beard himself got to help design the food challenge with the restaurant owners.	
12 December 2015	Trying to eat the biggest Christmas Dinner ever assembled	(United Kingdom) Stockton-on-Tees, UK	The George	Special Food Stunt by the Restaurant	20 lbs	1:00:00		Unfinished	Lost		Huge Christmas dinner - World Record Breaking size. A whole turkey, potatoes, parsnips, sprouts, broccoli, cauliflower, stuffing, gravy mashed swede, and cranberry sauce. Battered Mars bar for dessert. Beard managed to finish 12 lbs in an hour.	
15 November 2015	The Hibernator Giant Breakfast Challenge	(United Kingdom) Congleton, UK	Bear Grills Cafe	The Hibernator Challenge	7 lbs		00:39:00	00:09:59	Won		8,000 calorie breakfast challenge. First attempted in April 2015. Previous record holder was Randy Santel - 39 minutes, and runner up was Emma Dalton with a time of 59:38.	
7 November 2015	The 30 XL Wing Challenge	(United Kingdom) London, UK	Man Vs Food London	Man V Food Burger Challenge		00:30:00		00:05:32	Won	T-Shirt, Wall of Fame, Free meal and £50	If you lose, you go on the wall of SHAME in the toilet and pay the restaurant £50! 30 wings in BBQ sauce - only 3 previous winners.	
19 October 2015	Three Eating Challenges in One Day (2000 Subscriber Landmark Thank you Challenge)	(United Kingdom) Leeds, UK	Smoke BBQ	Man V Food Burger Challenge		00:30:00		00:21:35	Won	If you set a new record, you get a £100 voucher.	4 patty burger topped with fried onions, brisket pulled pork and cheese. Sides: 2 cornbread muffins, 1 lb of fries and a 2pt milkshake. Previously undefeated at the Leed's branch, but completed by Randy Santel at the Sheffield Branch. Cheesecake for dessert!	
19 October 2015	Three Eating Challenges in One Day (2000 Subscriber Landmark Thank you Challenge)	(United Kingdom) Leeds, UK	Meat Liquor	Triple Chili Challenge		00:10:00		00:09:57	Won		Repeat challenge, new location - Chili burger, chili dog and chili cheese fries	
19 October 2015	Three Eating Challenges in One Day (2000 Subscriber Landmark Thank you Challenge)	(United Kingdom) Leeds, UK	The Greasy Pig	Headingley's Paralyzer Breakfast		00:12:00		Unfinished	Lost		Full English Breakfast	
8 October 2015	The 32oz Whale Fish N Chips Challenge	(United Kingdom) Ossett, UK	Casey's Fish N Chip Shop	The Whale Challenge	"1/2 the size of a 6 year old"		00:27:00	00:23:36	Won		Previously only defeated 1 time. 32oz battered cod, chips, bun, beans, gravy, curry, and a slushy.	
30 June 2015	The Desperate Mexican Burrito Challenge	(United Kingdom) Wakefield, West Yorkshire, UK	The Smokehouse	Desperate Mexican	6 lbs	00:30:00	Undefeated	00:14:05	Won		Previously Undefeated. 6 lb Pulled Pork burrito with the works! Vanilla milkshake on the side. Cheesecake for dessert. Two upcoming eating competitions mentioned in the video - hot dog eating competition Trinity Kitchen in Leeds, and The Fat Donut eating competition.	
21 June 2015	The Yorkshire Pudding Eating World Championships	(United Kingdom) Yorkshire, UK		Yorkshire Pudding World Championship 2015		00:03:00			Won	Trophy, Title of World Champion	Beard's Competitive Eating Debut. 40 Puddings Eaten!	
16 June 2015	The Widowmaker Hot Dog Challenge	(United Kingdom) Huddersfield, Yorkshire, UK	The Ox and Bone	The Widowmaker		00:45:00	00:43:00	00:20:00	Won	T-Shirt, Free Meal and Dessert	Only finished once before Beard. Fully loaded giant hot dog with pulled pork, brisket, crispy onions, pickles and chips.	
29 May 2015	The Pig Out Platter Challenge	(United Kingdom) Yarm, UK	The Purple Pig	Pig Out Challenge		00:30:00	00:20:00	00:19:11	Won	Lifetime 25% off card, Free Meal	Burger with five patties, pulled pork, chili, onion rings and mushrooms (ew.) Also, a chili dog, 10 pigs in blankets, sweet potato wedges, fries, hashbrowns, waffles, guacamole, and four cobs of corn. Finally a shake and an ice cream sundae. Served on a bin lid.	
28 May 2015	THE TRIPLE CHILLI CHALLENGE	(United Kingdom) London, UK	Meat Liquor	Triple Chilli Challenge		00:10:00	00:03:00	00:05:15	Won	Free Meal	Hot dog eating competition is mentioned, not shown. 25 hotdogs eaten prior to this challenge. Chili Dog, Chili fries, Chili Burger.	
17 May 2015	The MONSTER DOG CHALLENGE	(United Kingdom) Birmingham, UK	Smokey's	Monster dog	4+lbs	01:00:00	00:27:00	00:19:32	Won		Chili Cheese dog, over 1 meter long, plus fries and coleslaw. Previous record holder: Emma Dalton	
12 May 2015	ANOTHER BIG BREAKFAST CHALLENGE	(United Kingdom) Leeds, UK	Cafe Indulgence	Breakfast challenge		00:30:00		00:15:27	Won		Beginning of video - Cream egg challenge is mentioned (Not Shown.) Full English breakfast.	
6 April 2015	6LB BURRITO CHALLENGE	(United Kingdom) Harrogate, UK	Salsa Posada	El Conquistador	6 lbs	00:30:00	00:28:00	00:13:04	Won	Wall of Fame	6 lb Burrito, shot of Tequila, and 1 lb sweet potato fries	
25 March 2015	4FT HOT DOG CHALLENGE: Man Vs Dog 2 - Dog Harder @ Huckleberry's Diner, York	(United Kingdom) Flaxton, UK	Huckleberry's Diner	Man Vs Dog 2		01:00:00		Not completed	Lost		4 ft hot dog with toppings, tactical ice cream on the side. It was supposed to be a hot dog bun, but the chef used a baguette by accident. Oops!	
18 March 2015	THE UNDEFEATED GIANT NAAN BREAD CHALLENGE	(United Kingdom) Bradford, UK	Omar's restaurant	Omar's Unfinishable Naan Challenge		00:35:00		00:21:53	Won	Trip to Barcelona, Free Meal	Undefeated 10 years! Over 700 attempts. 3 ft Naan bread and choice of curry.	
22 February 2015	CHEESEY BURGER & SHAKE CHALLENGE	(United Kingdom) Wakefield, UK	Grill Pit	Le Grande Fromage		00:35:00	00:17:00	00:15:40	Won	T-Shirt, Wall of Fame, Free Meal	Burger, hot dog, mozz sticks, cheese fries and cheesecake milkshake. Bonus Cheesecake dessert!	
16 February 2015	GIANT PANCAKE CHALLENGE	(United Kingdom) Flaxton, UK	Huckleberry's Diner	Pancake problem challenge	4 lbs	01:30:00	00:58:00	00:16:21	Won		4 lbs of pancakes with ice cream, fruit, syrup and cream. Bonus meatloaf dinner for "dessert".	
13 February 2015	THE UNDEFEATED YORKSHIRE PUDDING BURGER CHALLENGE	(United Kingdom) Wakefield, UK	Smokehouse	Yorkshire Pudding Burger Challenge		00:25:00		Not completed	Lost		Burger (2 patties) with mozzarella, pulled chicken, beef brisket, and gravy all between two Yorkshire puddings. 1 pt chocolate shake and 1 lb fries	
2 February 2015	Macho Nacho Challenge @ Huckleberry's Diner (Again)	(United Kingdom) Flaxton, UK	Huckleberry's Diner	Macho Nacho Challenge	4 lbs	Unknown	00:32:00	00:31:00	Won	Wall of Fame	Pulled pork nachos, side of chocolate ice cream (not included in challenge.) Sped up video with commentary.	
27 January 2015	UK GIANT BURGER CHALLENGE: Lawrence Light Lunch Challenge @ Huckleberry's Diner	(United Kingdom) Flaxton, UK	Huckleberry's Diner	Lawrence Light Lunch Challenge (Hamburger)	6 lbs	01:00:00		00:45:00	Won	T-Shirt, Bumper Sticker, and £20 Gift Card	Burger, onion rings, fries. Sped up video with Banjo music, no commentary.	

== See also ==
- List of competitive eaters
