= Sweet Weaponry =

Studio album by Cruiserweight
- Released: February 15, 2005
- Genre: Pop punk
- Label: Doghouse/Heinous Records

Sweet Weaponry is the first studio album by the pop punk band Cruiserweight.

"To Be Quite Honest" is featured on the video game 'Saints Row', on the radio station 89.0 Generation X.

Stanton Swihart of AllMusic rated the album 4 out of 5 stars. He wrote: Sweet Weaponry springs melodic surprise after melodic surprise […] and it has more hooks than a meat-packing plant. It's an awesome, knockout record."

== Track listing ==
1. "Vermont" - 3:14
2. "Goodbye Daily Sadness" - 3:21
3. "At the End of the Tunnel There is Always a Shining Light" - 3:45
4. "Passible" - 1:48
5. "This Ain't No Beach Party" - 3:27
6. "Phantom Rider" - 4:20
7. "To Be Quite Honest" - 3:41
8. "Vacation/Vacate" - 3:35
9. "Dearest Drew" - 3:30
10. "Operation Eyes Closed" - 4:32
11. "Permanent Things" - 3:58
12. "There You Are" - 3:12
13. "Have You Had One of Those Days?" - 3:16

== Personnel ==
- Stella Maxwell - Lead vocals
- David Hawkins - Bass
- Urny Maxwell - Guitar
- Yogi Maxwell - Drums
