= Too Young to Fight It =

Studio album by Young Love
- Released: January 30, 2007
- Recorded: 2006
- Studio: Moles Studio (Bath, UK); Stratosphere Sound (New York, NY)
- Genre: Rock; dance; electronic
- Length: 38:08
- Label: Island
- Producer: Dan Keyes; Dante Ross; Rory Phillips; Steve Osborne

Young Love chronology
Young Love EP (2006)	Too Young to Fight It (2007)	One of Us (2009)

Singles from Too Young to Fight It
- 1. "Discotech" Released: October 2006; 2. "Find a New Way" Released: July 31, 2007

Professional ratings
Review scores
Source	Rating
AllMusic	2.5/5 stars
IGN	6.5/10
PopMatters	5/10
Punknews.org	3.5/5 stars

Too Young to Fight It is the debut full-length studio album by American dance-rock band Young Love. It was released on January 30, 2007, through Island Records. Recording sessions took place at Moles Studio in Bath and at Stratosphere Sound in New York City. Production was handled by Steve Osborne, Dan Keyes, Rory Phillips and Dante Ross.

== Track listing ==
No.	Title	Producer(s)	Length
1.	"Discotech"	Steve Osborne	3:54
2.	"Give Up"	Dante Ross	3:08
3.	"Closer to You"	Steve Osborne	3:28
4.	"Too Young to Fight It"	Steve Osborne; Dan Keyes; Rory Phillips	3:21
5.	"Nameless One"	Steve Osborne	4:43
6.	"Find a New Way"	Dante Ross	2:52
7.	"Tell Me"	Steve Osborne	3:29
8.	"Take It or Leave It"	Steve Osborne; Dan Keyes; Rory Phillips	3:03
9.	"Tragedy"	Steve Osborne; Dan Keyes; Rory Phillips	2:57
10.	"Underneath the Night Sky"	Steve Osborne	4:13
11.	"Close Your Eyes"	Steve Osborne; Dan Keyes; Rory Phillips	3:00
Total length:			38:08

== Personnel ==
- Dan Keyes – vocals, songwriter, guitar (tracks: 1–3, 5–11), keyboards (tracks: 2–6, 8, 10), bass (tracks: 3, 7–9), producer (tracks: 4, 8, 9, 11)
- Robert Mann – backing vocals (tracks: 1, 5), lead guitar (track 1), percussion (track 3), guitar (tracks: 4, 10), bass (tracks: 5, 8), drums
- Craig Tweedy – bass (track 1)
- Rory Phillips – songwriter (tracks: 4, 5, 7, 10), additional keyboards (tracks: 1, 4, 10), programming (track 8), producer (tracks: 4, 8, 9, 11)
- Damian Taylor – programming (tracks: 1, 3–5, 7–11)
- Dante Ross – drum programming & producer (tracks: 2, 6)
- Steve Osborne – producer & recording (tracks: 1, 3–5, 7–11)
- William "Bo" Boddie – recording & Pro Tools editing (tracks: 2, 6)
- Mark Needham – mixing (tracks: 1, 2, 4, 6, 8, 10)
- James Brown – mixing (tracks: 3, 5, 7, 9, 11)
- Paul Corkett – engineering assistant (tracks: 1, 3–5, 7–11)
- Nick Joplin – engineering assistant (tracks: 1, 3–5, 7–11)
- Brian Gardner – mastering
- Andy West – art direction, design
- Kenneth Cappello – photography
- Kristen Yiengst – photo and art coordinator
- Jameelah Ricks – A&R
- Terese Joseph – A&R
- Robert Stevenson – A&R
