= Young Lust =

Young Lust may refer to:

- Young Lust (comics), an underground comics anthology series that debuted in 1970
- "Young Lust" (song), a 1979 song by Pink Floyd
- "Young Lust", a song performed by Ellen Foley on the 1979 album Night Out
- Young Lust (film) (1984), starring Fran Drescher
- Young Lust: The Aerosmith Anthology, a 2001 compilation album
  - "Young Lust", a song by Aerosmith from the 1989 album Pump, and included on the compilation album

== See also ==
- Young Love (disambiguation)
