= After Dark (The Count & Sinden song) =

Single by The Count & Sinden featuring Mystery Jets

from the album MEGA MEGA MEGA
- Released: 15 August 2010
- Genre: Electronic
- Length: 4:29
- Label: Domino Records
- Songwriter: The Count & Sinden
- Producers: The Count & Sinden

The Count & Sinden singles chronology
"MEGA" (2009)	"After Dark" (2010)

Mystery Jets singles chronology
"Dreaming of Another World" (2010)	"After Dark" (2010)	"Serotonin" (2011)

"After Dark" is the fourth single by British music duo the Count & Sinden, from their debut studio album, MEGA, MEGA, MEGA. The song features the British alternative rock band Mystery Jets and was added to BBC Radio 1's B Playlist in August 2010. The single was first released as a digital download on 15 August 2010, with the CD single released the following day.

== Track listing ==
=== Digital download ===
No.	Title	Length
1.	"After Dark [featuring Mystery Jets]"	4:29
2.	"After Dark (The Count's Afterdub Mix) [featuring Mystery Jets]"	3:51

=== Remixes EP ===
No.	Title	Length
1.	"After Dark (Buraka Som Sistema Remix) [featuring Mystery Jets]"	4:36
2.	"After Dark (Oliver Twizt Remix) [featuring Mystery Jets]"	5:01
3.	"After Dark (C.R.S.T. Remix) [featuring Mystery Jets]"	5:07

== Music video ==
The video cuts between clips of Mystery Jets & The Count & Sinden performing the song whilst watching a dance competition. The main plot features three judges and six dancers, doing dances such as "Street Ballet" and one of the dancers is played by fellow Mystery Jets member, Blaine Harrison. In the end, the two best dancers create a new dance and the video ends with Mystery Jets, The Count & Sinden, the judges, the dancers & the audience dancing and singing the song.

== Chart performance ==
"After Dark" debuted on the UK Singles Chart on 22 August 2010 at number 47, marking the duo's most successful single to date after "Beeper" featuring Kid Sister reached number 69 in 2008. The single also debuted at number 4 on the UK Indie Chart, where it remained for two consecutive weeks. On its second week in the chart, the single fell 14 places to number 61.

Chart (2010)	Peak
UK Singles (OCC)	47
UK Indie (OCC)	4
