= Serotonin (album) =

Studio album by Mystery Jets
- Released: 5 July 2010
- Recorded: British Grove Studios; Chiswick, West London, UK
- Genre: Indie rock
- Length: 44:30
- Label: Rough Trade
- Producer: Chris Thomas

Mystery Jets chronology
Twenty One (2008)	Serotonin (2010)	Radlands (2012)

Singles from Serotonin
- 1. "Flash A Hungry Smile" Released: 19 April 2010; 2. "Dreaming of Another World" Released: 5 July 2010; 3. "Show Me the Light" Released: 1 November 2010

Professional ratings
Aggregate scores
Source	Rating
Metacritic	77/100
Review scores
Source	Rating
AllMusic	3.5/5 stars
BBC	(very positive)
Clash (magazine)	9/10 stars
Drowned in Sound	8/10
FutureTunez	3/5 stars
Green Shoelace	(very positive)
One Thirty BPM	65%
Pitchfork Media	6.8/10
TheYellowMusicBlog	5/6 stars

Serotonin is the third studio album by Mystery Jets, released in the UK on 5 July 2010. The album is produced by Chris Thomas.

== Track listing ==
No.	Title	Length
1.	"Alice Springs"	5:18
2.	"Too Late to Talk"	4:14
3.	"The Girl is Gone"	3:41
4.	"Flash a Hungry Smile"	3:47
5.	"Serotonin"	3:25
6.	"Show Me the Light"	3:08
7.	"Dreaming of Another World"	3:39
8.	"Lady Grey"	3:35
9.	"Waiting on a Miracle"	3:53
10.	"Melt"	4:15
11.	"Lorna Doone"	5:35
Total length:		44:30

iTunes bonus tracks
No.	Title	Length
12.	"Make Up Your Mind"	4:00
13.	"Skinny Jeanne"	3:07
14.	"Dreaming of Another World" (Lindstrom & Prins Thomas Remix)	9:57

Amazon.com bonus track
No.	Title	Length
12.	"Damon and Justine"	3:38
