= Discotech (song) =

Single by Young Love

from the album Young Love EP/ Too Young to Fight It
- Released: September 2006 (U.S.)
- Recorded: 2006
- Genre: Rock, dance-rock, electronic
- Length: 3:55
- Label: Island/ Universal Music
- Songwriter(s): Dan Keyes
- Producer(s): Dan Keyes

Young Love singles chronology
| "Discotech" (2006) | "Find a New Way" (2007) |

"Discotech" is the debut single by American dance-rock band Young Love. It was recorded in New York City, New York and features songwriting, production and vocals from musician Dan Keyes. The single first appeared on the band's Young Love EP and also appears on their full-length debut, Too Young to Fight It, released on January 30, 2007, in the United States.

The single premiered in September, when two short promotional vignettes were released. In October, a full video featuring live footage was released, and on November 21, 2006, the song was made commercially available on iTunes on the Young Love EP. It was also featured on EA Sports' FIFA 07.

== Track listing ==
1. "Discotech"
2. "Tragedy"
3. "Discotech" (Lindbergh Palace Remix) [mix]
4. "Tragedy" (Lindbergh Palace Remix) [mix]
5. "Discotech" Video [multimedia track]

== Promotional vignettes ==
The first promotional vignette for "Discotech" features a girl getting ready to go out, trying on different clothes and singing to the camera. At the beginning of the clip, an onscreen clock displays the time as "7:00PM", and says that she has an hour to get ready. After running around her room dancing and trying on tons of different outfits, she is shown sleeping on her bed. The clip ends with the clock appearing again, but only one minute has passed, and the time is now "7:01pm"
