= Zootime =

Compilation album by Mystery Jets
- Released: 8 May 2007
- Label: Dim Mak
- Producer: James Ford; Mystery Jets

Mystery Jets chronology
Making Dens (2006)	Zootime (2007)	Twenty One (2008)

Professional ratings
Aggregate scores
Source	Rating
Metacritic	76/100
Review scores
Source	Rating
AllMusic	4/5 stars

Zootime is a compilation album by the British band Mystery Jets, consisting of tracks from their UK-only debut Making Dens, and from the Flotsam and Jetsam EP.

== Track listing ==
All tracks written by Mystery Jets.

1. "Diamonds in the Dark"
2. "Inside Four Walls"
3. "Scarecrows in the Rain"
4. "The Boy Who Ran Away"
5. "Soluble in Air"
6. "Horse Drawn Cart"
7. "Zoo Time"
8. "You Can't Fool Me Dennis"
9. "Purple Prose of Cairo"
10. "Little Bag of Hair"
11. "Umbrellahead"
12. "Crosswords"
