= Curve of the Earth (album) =

Studio album by Mystery Jets
- Released: 15 January 2016
- Genre: Indie rock
- Length: 48:24
- Label: Rough Trade

Mystery Jets chronology
Radlands (2012)	Curve of the Earth (2016)	A Billion Heartbeats (2020)

Singles from Curve of the Earth
- 1. "Telomere" Released: 8 December 2015; 2. "Bubblegum" Released: 4 March 2016

Professional ratings
Aggregate scores
Source	Rating
Metacritic	73/100
Review scores
Source	Rating
AllMusic	4/5 stars
Clash Music	7/10
Drowned in Sound	7/10
The Guardian	3/5 stars

Curve of the Earth is the fifth studio album by the Mystery Jets.

The album peaked at number 30 on the UK Albums Chart.

== Track listing ==
No.	Title	Length
1.	"Telomere"	3:54
2.	"Bombay Blue"	4:55
3.	"Bubblegum"	4:25
4.	"Midnight's Mirror"	5:56
5.	"1985"	4:04
6.	"Blood Red Balloon"	6:44
7.	"Taken by the Tide"	5:36
8.	"Saturnine"	6:20
9.	"The End Up"	6:30
Total length:		48:24
