= Not Mathematics =

EP by Casimir
- Released: 4 March 2013
- Recorded: 2012
- Genre: Alternative, indie rock, post-rock
- Length: 17:03
- Label: Fear Of Fiction
- Producer: Joey Edwards

Singles from Not Mathematics
- 1. "Like Whistles" Released: February 2013; 2. "Lucid" Released: March 2013

Not Mathematics is the first extended play released by the English rock band Casimir. The first video from this release was "Balancing Act", premiered on NME.com in January 2013, followed by the release of the singles "Like Whistles" and "Lucid" in February and March respectively.

== Track listing ==
No.	Title	Length
1.	"Balancing Act"	2:09
2.	"Lucid"	4:29
3.	"Like Whistles"	4:25
4.	"Broken Minds Think Alike"	2:40
5.	"Squeeze Right There"	3:20
Total length:		17:03

== Release history ==
Region	Date	Label	Format
United Kingdom	4 March 2013	Fear Of Fiction	Digital download, CD
