= Young Love (band) =

American dance-rock band

- Origin: New York City, New York, U.S.
- Genres: Rock, dance-rock, alternative dance, electronic
- Years active: 2005–2009
- Labels: Island Records; Konspiracy Theory Music
- Past members: Dan Keyes; Bob Mann; Santiago Vela III; Ross Tweedy; Erik Tonnesen
- Website: Official Website

Young Love is an American dance-rock band. Dan Keyes is the main singer. They were formed in 2005 in New York City. Rory Phillips handles the majority of the production and songwriting. Young Love's debut full-length album, Too Young to Fight It was released on January 30, 2007 in the United States.

== History ==
Prior to creating Young Love, Dan Keyes fronted the Austin, Texas post-hardcore band Recover with much help from Rory Phillips. After releasing three albums with the quartet, Keyes felt the need for change, but continued work with Phillips. A friend offered him a place to stay in New York City, and within weeks Keyes was traveling from Austin to New York with just one bag and his guitar. Keyes spent 2005 working at a restaurant in the city as well as working on music that he started while he was touring with Recover. At the end of 2005 Island Records signed the musician, and by summer 2006, Keyes and his band, now known as Young Love, were performing with Stolen Transmission at Annex in New York City. In mid-July, a live video of Keyes performing the song "We Want Drugs" acoustic was released on YouTube.

In September, two short promotional videos were released for the single "Discotech". The single was also featured on the FIFA 07 soundtrack. In October, a full video featuring live footage was released for the single, and on November 21, 2006, the Young Love EP was released on iTunes, and featured "Discotech" a new song, "Tragedy" and two remixes. In December, Young Love played several shows with British MC Lady Sovereign.

In early January 2007, Billboard listed Young Love as one of "2007's Best Bets" for the year, and described their album as "...the kind of pop that we've been missing: melodic, catchy, smart and as young and in love-with the ubiquitous 'she'-as Romeo...". On January 3, 2007, MTV premiered the video for the band's newest single, "Find A New Way". In addition, the single will serve as the theme song for the network's Jennifer Lopez-produced reality series, DanceLife, which premiered January 15, 2007.

January 30, 2007 was the official release of Young Love's full-length debut, Too Young to Fight It. The album includes both "Discotech" and "Tragedy" along with nine more original songs. In February 2007, the band toured with better known artists, playing shows with several different acts including Head Automatica, Lady Sovereign and Good Charlotte. On April 29, 2007, the band signed with the Konspiracy Theory Music promotion company. The band has toured North America, Europe and United Kingdom.

In July and August 2007, Young Love supported Erasure on their headlining US tour.

Their song "Close Your Eyes" off of Too Young to Fight It was featured on the "My Happy Place" episode of Scrubs and on the episode "Sad Songs for Dirty Lovers" on One Tree Hill.

Young Love's second full length record, One Of Us came out April 28, 2009 on Island Records, recorded by John King in Los Angeles, California. The band promoted the new album with a three-week residency at New York's Webster Hall.

== Members ==
Past members

- Dan Keyes - lead vocals, guitar
- Bob Mann - guitar, bass, backing vocals
- Erik Tonnesen - keyboard
- Santiago Vela III - drums (2008–2009)
- Terrence Campbell - drums (2006–2008)
- Ross Tweedy - bass (2006–2008)
- Danny Wood - bass (2006)
- Jeremy Hollehan - bass (2009)
- Todd Weinstock - guitar (2008)
- Vincent Perini - guitar (2008)

== Discography ==
=== Albums ===
- Too Young to Fight It (2007)
- One of Us (2009)

=== EPs ===
- Young Love EP

=== Non album tracks ===
- "1979" (from Helio Presents: The Smashing Pumpkins Tribute CD)

=== Singles ===
Year	Song	Chart positions		Album
Year	Song	U.S. 100	U.S. Club	Album
2006	"Discotech"	-	2	Young Love EP
2007	"Find a New Way"	103	-	Too Young to Fight It
2007	"Too Young to Fight It"			Too Young to Fight It
2008	"Underground"			
2009	"Get Me Up"			One of Us
2009	"One To Ten"			One of Us
