= One of Us (Young Love album) =

Studio album by Young Love
- Released: April 28, 2009
- Genre: Rock, alternative dance, electronica
- Length: 33:09
- Label: Fontana Island

Young Love chronology
Too Young to Fight It (2007)	One of Us (2009)

Professional ratings
Review scores
Source	Rating
Absolutepunk.net	45% link
Allmusic	link
The Tune	D+ link

One of Us is the second full-length album released by alternative dance band Young Love. It was released on April 28, 2009 on Island Records. The album was recorded in Los Angeles California by producer John King. All songs were written by songwriter, guitarist and singer Dan Keyes. Other musicians included guitarist Robert Mann, keyboardist Erik Tonnesen and drummer Santiago "Jimmy" Vela III.

== Track listing ==
1. "Unafraid" – 3:25
2. "One to Ten" – 2:37
3. "Get Me Up" – 3:45
4. "Black Boots" – 3:35
5. "The Picture" – 3:11
6. "Down on Me" – 3:16
7. "Turn It Up" – 3:20
8. "Don't Fight It" – 3:04
9. "Can You Hear Me" – 3:56
10. "Love For Sale" – 2:59
