= You Can't Fool Me Dennis =

Single by Mystery Jets
- Released: 12 October 2005
- Recorded: 2005
- Length: 3:39
- Label: 679 Recordings
- Songwriters: Henry Harrison, William Rees
- Producers: James Ford; Mystery Jets

Mystery Jets singles chronology
"On My Feet" (2005)	"You Can't Fool Me Dennis" (2005)	"Alas Agnes" (2005)
"The Boy Who Ran Away" (2006)	""You Can't Fool Me Dennis" (re-release)" (2006)	"Diamonds in the Dark" (2006)

"You Can't Fool Me Dennis" was the third single by Mystery Jets, released in October 2005. The song was later released as part of their debut album, Making Dens, albeit in a slightly altered, re-recorded form.

== Critical and commercial reception ==
You Can't Fool Me Dennis was favourably received by the music press. Mark Moore of Contactmusic.com positively reviewed the single version, describing it as having a "fresh sound" and exemplifying the quality of the bands on the 2006 iteration of the NME ShockWaves tour. In his review of Making Dens, Stewart Mason of AllMusic characterized the song as an example of the "quirky, interesting pop songs" on the album, and likened it to a song from one of XTC's early albums with Barry Andrews as interpreted by Franz Ferdinand.

You Can't Fool Me Dennis made two appearances on the UK Singles Chart. The first of these came in autumn 2005, which saw the standalone single version peak at number 44. You Can't Fool Me Dennis entered the charts again after the single release of its Making Dens version, rising to number 41 in May 2006. On both of these occasions, it concurrently entered the UK Physical Singles Chart, peaking at number 34 during its first run there and number 24 during its second.

== Track listings ==
All songs written by Mystery Jets.

=== 7" vinyl (679L109) ===
1. "You Can't Fool Me Dennis" – 3:39
2. "Quite A Delight" – 1:51

=== CD (679L109CD) ===
1. "You Can't Fool Me Dennis" – 3:39
2. "Ageless" – 5:59

=== Limited edition 7" vinyl (679L109X) ===
1. "You Can't Fool Me Dennis (Justice mix)" – 3:59
2. "You Can't Fool Me Dennis (acoustic version)" – 04:20

=== Limited edition 12" vinyl (MSYTJ01) ===
1. "You Can't Fool Me Dennis (Justice mix)" – 03:59
2. "You Can't Fool Me Dennis (Straight Bat version)" – 05:14
3. "Zoo Time (Erol Alkan rework)" – 04:55

== Charts ==
Chart	Peak position
UK Singles (Official Charts)	41
