= The Impossibles (American band) =

Rock music band

Background information
- Origin: Austin, Texas, USA
- Genres: Indie rock; alternative rock; ska punk; punk rock
- Years active: 1994–1998; 2000–2002; 2012; 2026-present
- Label: Fueled by Ramen
- Past members: Rory Phillips; Craig Tweedy; Pat Elliott; Gabe Hascall; Santiago "Jimmy" Vela III; Kemble Walters

The Impossibles is an American rock band from Austin, Texas, originally on the Fueled by Ramen label. They played ska punk prior to their first break-up in 1998, but transitioned to a more indie rock and alternative rock sound upon reuniting.

In their time together, The Impossibles played shows with Less Than Jake, Sugarcult, The Toadies, Recover and others.

Lead singers Rory Phillips and Gabe Hascall were also in the Fueled by Ramen group Slowreader following the band's second break-up, in 2002.

On February 13, 2012, the Impossibles announced a reunion show and launched a new website.

On January 26, 2026, The Impossibles announced their return via Facebook.

== History ==
=== Early years: 1994–1998 ===
They started as a band called the Fat Girls, with Craig's brother Brian singing lead vocals. Brian was replaced by Gabe, who had been playing bass in a hardcore band called Loophole. He started as just a singer, but began also playing guitar pretty quickly as it made him more comfortable while on stage. They rebranded themselves The Impossibles, after the Hanna-Barbera cartoon of the same name. They also took to wearing matching baseball jerseys as "their version of Kiss' make-up."

Their music was described as a cross between Operation Ivy and Weezer, with notable influences also including Avail and Nirvana. They recorded a demo tape and a split seven inch with Austin pop punk band Dynamite Boy, and they gained the attention of Less Than Jake drummer Vinnie Fiorello who signed them to his start-up label Fueled by Ramen. Their first release on the label was actually a re-release of their self-titled debut CD, which had previously been self-released under the Red Five Records label. During this time, their music found its way onto compilations from labels large and small, including Moon Ska, Asian Man, Drive Thru, and many, many others.

In 1997, the band found themselves at a crossroads. Their popularity was growing and a tour with Mu330 had gone well, but college and relationships were pulling them in different directions. They announced their intention to disband in late 1997, but did not play their "final" show until Super Bowl Sunday, 1998 along with Less Than Jake and Riverfenix (later Fenix*TX) at Liberty Lunch in Austin, Texas. The Back for the Attack EP which came out about that time was then considered to be their swan song.

=== After the original break-up: 1998–2000 ===
Rory by far was the most active member of the band after the breakup, playing bass on the Missile Command album Sexy, Sexy Confidence, and briefly forming the band Go Kappa! with Jerm Pollet. After that dissolved, he formed, played shows with, and recorded an EP with Imbroco, a band which featured the half of the band Mineral that was not in the Gloria Record. After Imbroco imploded, he shared some solo demos of some rock songs with John Janick, Jr who was running Fueled by Ramen Records, and he suggested starting a band with Jamie Woolford, formerly of Fueled by Ramen ska/punk band Animal Chin. The resulting pair called themselves The Stereo and began work on their debut full length, Three Hundred.

During this time, Fueled by Ramen released posthumous albums compiling previous releases as well as unreleased tracks for both the Impossibles and Animal Chin. The Impossibles release was titled Anthology. It contained the full length and EP, as well as songs recorded before, in between, and after both. Due to royalty-related issues, later pressings removed the cover of Michael Jackson's "Ben" and Irving Berlin's "White Christmas". The version without the covers is titled Anthology '94 – '98.

The Stereo toured the country twice, and response was increasingly favorable, but tensions arose and Rory was released from the band at the end of their fall 1999 tour.

Rory found himself sharing a small one bedroom apartment in Austin with Gabe Hascall, and they reconnected as songwriters. They recorded acoustic demos (some of which would later evolve into Slowreader songs) and decided they'd try to reunite the Impossibles. Both Craig and Pat jumped at the idea, even though Craig was playing bass and writing songs in the band Cruiserweight at the time.

=== Reunion: 2000–2002 ===
They began practicing and writing songs together and recorded the album Return. Their new material retained the quiet/loud dynamic, heavy choruses, and vocal interplay that marked their previous releases, while ditching the ska guitar parts they felt they had grown out of. They played a sold-out reunion show at Emo's in March 2000 and toured the country in support of the new release.

In 2001, while recording songs for an EP, tensions with drummer Pat Elliott began to mount, and eventually he was asked to leave the band. While they continued to tour and support the new EP, they were increasingly unhappy with the fans' reaction to their new material and the complaints over their growing aversion to ska. Ultimately, they decided to break up again, playing two final shows in one day at Emo's in June 2002.

=== After the second break-up: 2002–present ===
Rory Phillips and Gabe Hascall subsequently put their focus back towards the acoustic songwriting that had helped them reconnect, and they recorded and toured as Slowreader.

During this time Rory more seriously put his focus on producing and recording other bands. He recorded, produced, and co-wrote demo songs with Dan Keyes of Recover under the name American Express, which would later come to be known as Young Love.

His latest project is The Artificial Heart, which evolved from earlier projects the20goto10 and Nineteen Ninety Now and features songs written for both.

Gabe had started a band called the Record Heat in 2003 and moved to California to pursue it, but moved back to Austin and began playing and recording as a solo performer. He currently lives in Austin and has released two records via Austin Town Hall Records.

Craig Tweedy currently plays with Rory in The Artificial Heart.

Beginning in early 2010, an internet presence was revived consisting of a Twitter account and an official Facebook fanpage. This, combined with speculation of album reissues through Paper + Plastick, had fueled rumors of some kind of reunion, which was ultimately announced on 2/13/12.

Original drummer Pat Elliott died at age 34 on May 8, 2015, due to complications of kidney failure.

=== Second reunion: 2012 ===
On June 9, 2012, ten years and one week after their last show, The Impossibles played a reunion at the Mohawk in Austin, TX. Due to selling out the reunion show in hours, the Impossibles added a second show on June 10, 2012. The band was joined onstage by former fill-in drummer, Santiago "Jimmy" Vela III for the concerts. On February 2, 2013, the band released a live video recording of one of the reunion performances, titled "Long Way From/Long Time Since (Live)" online via Priorities Intact Records. In July 2013 Fun Fun Fun Fest announced that The Impossibles would be a performing at the festival. On August 1, 2013, the band hinted at the possibility of new recordings and in October 2013 they released a 7" titled "Come Back B/W the Position" on Priorities Intact Records. Both songs feature drummer Mark Toohey.

=== 2026 reunion ===
On January 26, 2026, The Impossibles announced their return, with shows planned in St. Louis, Chicago and Detroit in August, followed by an appearance at the Supernova Ska Festival in Hampton, VA, in September. They will also perform at The Fest 24 in Gainesville, FL in October. The band kicked off its three-date tour with a hometown secret show in Austin, TX on August 19, 2026.

== Band members ==
=== Original members ===
- Gabe Hascall — vocals, guitar
- Rory Phillips — vocals, guitar
- Craig Tweedy — bass guitar
- Pat Elliott — drums

=== Touring/fill-in ===
- Mark Toohey — drums
- Santiago "Jimmy" Vela III — drums
- Kemble Walters — drums
- Ian Richardson — drums
- Craig Motaro — bass

== Discography ==
- The Impossibles (November 25, 1997)
- Back for the Attack (EP) (February 2, 1998)
- Anthology '94–'98 (May 11, 1999)
- Return (June 13, 2000)
- 4 Song Brick Bomb (EP) (June 12, 2001)
- Long Way From // Long Time Since (Live Album) (2013)
- Come Back/The Position (7 Inch) (2013)

== See also ==
- Music of Austin
