= Young Love EP =

EP by Young Love
- Released: November 21, 2006 (U.S.)
- Recorded: 2006
- Genre: Rock, dance, electronic
- Length: 15:09
- Label: Island/Universal Music
- Producer: Dan Keyes

Young Love chronology
Young Love EP (2006)	Too Young to Fight It (2007)

Young Love EP is the debut EP by American dance-rock band Young Love. The EP was recorded in New York City, New York and features songwriting, production and vocals from musician Dan Keyes. The EP was released exclusively on iTunes on November 21, 2006 in the United States, and features the single "Discotech".

== Track listing ==
1. "Discotech" - 3:55
2. "Tragedy" - 2:57
3. "Discotech (Lindbergh Palace Radio Edit)" - 4:26
4. "Discotech (Lindbergh Palace Remix)" - 3:51
