= Radlands (album) =

Studio album by Mystery Jets
- Released: 30 April 2012
- Recorded: Westlake, Austin, Texas, US
- Genre: Indie rock
- Length: 52:05
- Label: Rough Trade
- Producer: Dan Carey

Mystery Jets chronology
Serotonin (2010)	Radlands (2012)	Curve of the Earth (2016)

Singles from Radlands
- 1. "Someone Purer" Released: 16 April 2012; 2. "Greatest Hits" Released: 18 June 2012

Professional ratings
Aggregate scores
Source	Rating
Metacritic	67/100
Review scores
Source	Rating
AllMusic	4/5 stars
BBC	(positive)
Drowned in Sound	6/10
The Guardian	4/5 stars
The Independent	4/5 stars
NME	8/10 stars
Pitchfork	5.4/10

Radlands is the fourth studio album by the Mystery Jets. On 3 April 2012, shortly before the release of Radlands, Kai Fish announced he would be leaving the band, with bassist Pete Cochrane taking his place for the band's UK tour.

The album was recorded in a home recording studio set up in a country house by the Colorado river in the Westlake area in Austin, Texas.

The album peaked at number 40 on the UK Albums Chart.

The name 'Radlands' is an amalgamation of Keith Richards' 1960s apartment Redlands and the Terrence Malick film Badlands.

== Track listing ==
No.	Title	Length
1.	"Radlands"	5:28
2.	"You Had Me at Hello"	4:22
3.	"Someone Purer"	5:18
4.	"The Ballad of Emmerson Lonestar"	4:58
5.	"Greatest Hits"	3:35
6.	"The Hale Bop"	3:02
7.	"The Nothing"	4:55
8.	"Take Me Where the Roses Grow"	4:31
9.	"Sister Everett"	4:49
10.	"Lost in Austin"	6:19
11.	"Luminescense"	4:48
Total length:		52:05
