= Cruiserweight (band) =

American rock band from Austin, Texas

- Origin: Austin, Texas, United States
- Genres: Pop punk
- Years active: 1999–2010
- Labels: Doghouse Records; Heinous Records; Stab Me Records
- Members: Stella Maxwell; Yogi Maxwell; Urny Maxwell; David Hawkins
- Past members: Craig Tweedy - Bass; Shane Wells - Bass; Stan Olano - Bass; Bobby Andrews - Bass; Daniel Lancelot - Drums
- Website: Official Website

Cruiserweight was an American rock band from Austin, Texas, United States. The band consisted of vocalist Stella Maxwell, guitarist Urny Maxwell, bassist David Hawkins, and drummer Yogi Maxwell. The band's sound was defined by peppy female vocals, as well as fast, sometimes aggressive instrumentals, while still retaining a pop/punk overtone. The name originated from the boxing weight class of the same name.

== History ==
Prior to Cruiserweight, brothers Urny and Yogi Maxwell had been in a little-known band called Red Boxing from 1996 to 1998. March the following year, Cruiserweight was formed when the two brothers recruited their little sister, Stella (at the time only 18 years old), to sing in their new band. David Hawkins would also be added to the roster on bass after the departure of original bassist Craig Tweedy to return playing in The Impossibles. Cruiserweight formed in early 1999 in Austin where they gathered a small local following. During this time, the band gained attention by opening for already popular groups such as New Found Glory, Alkaline Trio, and The Get Up Kids.

Cruiserweight's first EP, First Day of School was released in 1999. In 2001, the band released an EP entitled This Will Undoubtedly Come Out Wrong. The EP sold around 11,000 copies locally.

The band's first album, Sweet Weaponry, was released on February 15, 2005, on Doghouse/Heinous Records. The band embarked on their first national tour shortly after the CD's release. On March 7, 2007, The Push and Pull, a compilation CD, was released on Heinous/Stab Me Records. The record featured re-recordings and alternative versions of previously released songs, as well as songs not previously released.

"To Be Quite Honest" is featured in the video game Saints Row, on the in-game radio station 89.0 Generation X.

Anticipation of the band's new album, Doghouse Records has put out an iTunes exclusive EP release, Cruiserweight Rocks the Moon. The EP features songs that appear on their new album, Big Bold Letters, as well as a music video for the new song "Balboa". Big Bold Letters was released on Doghouse Records on October 6, 2008. They self-released their final album, the Smith Tower, on March 5, 2010.

Cruiserweight has received praise from local Austin, Texas publications. The Austin Music Awards awarded the group "Best Alternative/Punk Band" in both 2002 and 2003, as well as "Best Punk Band" in 2004 and 2005.

On March 30, 2010, Cruiserweight announced their breakup. They scheduled two farewell shows: the first at Emo's in their hometown on April 24, 2010, the second at Pensacola, FL's Ready Room on April 30, 2010. On August 2, 2013, it was announced that Cruiserweight was reuniting for a one night only reunion at Vinyl Music Hall in Pensacola, Florida on November 23, 2010.

In early 2019, Cruiserweight announced a 20-year celebration show in Austin, Texas via the band's Facebook page.

== Current members ==
- Stella Maxwell - Lead vocals
- David Hawkins - Bass
- Urny Maxwell - Guitar
- Yogi Maxwell - Drums

== Past members ==
- Shane Wells - Bass
- Craig Tweedy - Bass
- Stan Olano - Bass
- Bobby Andrews - Bass
- Daniel Lancelot - Drums

== Discography ==
=== Studio albums ===
- Sweet Weaponry (2005) on Doghouse/Heinous Records
- Big Bold Letters (2008) on Doghouse Records
- The Smith Tower (2010) Cruiserweight Records

=== EPs ===
- First Day of School (1999) Cruiserweight Records
- This Will Undoubtedly Come Out Wrong (2001) Cruiserweight Records
- Cruiserweight Rocks the Moon (2008) on Doghouse Records (iTunes exclusive)

=== Compilations ===
- The Push and Pull (2007) on Heinous/Stab Me/Cruiserweight Records>
- Cruiserweight vs. Dynamite Boy (2003) on Stab Me Records
