= Mystery Jets =

English indie rock band

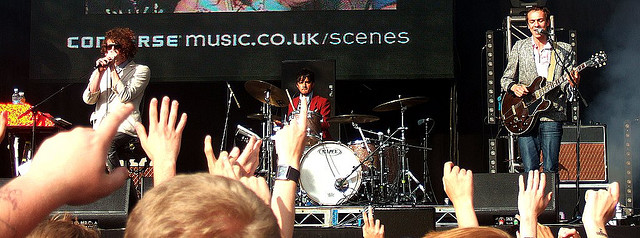
- Mystery Jets performing at the 2009 Underage Festival

Background information
- Origin: Eel Pie Island, Twickenham, London, England
- Genres: Indie rock, post-punk revival, indie pop, psychedelic rock, new prog
- Years active: 2003–present
- Labels: Caroline International (current), Rough Trade, 679, Transgressive, Dim Mak (former)
- Members: Blaine Harrison; Kapil Trivedi; Ollie Taylor; Eddie Taylor
- Past members: Jack Flanagan; William Rees; Kai Fish; Tamara Pearce-Higgins; Peter Cochrane; Matt Park; Henry Harrison
- Website: mysteryjets.com

Mystery Jets are an English indie rock band, formed on Eel Pie Island in Twickenham, London. The founding members still part of the band consist of Blaine Harrison (vocals, guitar and keyboards), Henry Harrison (lyrics), and Kapil Trivedi (drums).

== History ==
=== Formation and early demos (2003) ===
The band's first line-up consisted of Blaine Harrison on drums, William Rees on guitar and Henry Harrison (Blaine's father) on bass. Henry became a second guitarist in the band and they were joined by Kai Fish on bass and Tamara Pearce-Higgins on the organ. Kai joined the band after suggestions that they needed a bassist (he played the cello originally). Their original name was The Misery Jets, which was taken from an Evening Standard headline (Eel Pie Island is under the Heathrow flight path, where planes can be frequently spotted). It got changed to Mystery Jets when Blaine accidentally misspelled the name while painting it on a drum skin.

The band at this time recorded an eponymous EP with Aswad producer Nick Sykes. They would practise in the boat shed built by Henry on land he bought after a hippie commune on Eel Pie Island burnt down. Blaine (whose voice had yet to break) took lead vocals. Tamara left the band, and Blaine switched from drums to keyboards. The band had a brief stint with a friend of Williams' (known only as Max) on drums, but he was unreliable and for a time a drum machine was used. The band advertised on internet message boards for a drummer and found Kapil Trivedi. Kapil is not from Eel Pie Island like the rest of the members, but rather Wembley, North London. He found out about the band through his drum teacher. Mystery Jets draws influences from Hall and Oates, Syd Barrett, and Pink Floyd. William Rees has named Robert Fripp, Adrian Belew, Jimi Hendrix, and David Bowie as his guitar inspirations. Much attention has been drawn to their hosting of a series of parties, dubbed "The White Cross Revival", on Eel Pie Island.

=== Making Dens and Zootime (2005–2006) ===
The Eel Pie Island EP was recorded soon after by a young producer called Bishop Dante at Rooster studios. The band issued its first proper single, a limited edition 7" of "Zoo Time", on Transgressive Records. Mystery Jets ran a series of illegal parties on Eel Pie Island, attracting large crowds, before being shut down by the police. They went on to sign to 679 Recordings. 2005 saw a number of singles and their TV debut on MTV Two's Spanking New Music Week. The start of 2006 saw the band gain their highest-charting single with "The Boy Who Ran Away", play the ShockWaves NME Awards Tour and make their first appearance on Top of the Pops.

The band's debut UK album, Making Dens, was released on 6 March 2006. On 18 September 2006, the band put on a tribute show to Syd Barrett, one of their biggest influences. The show was put on at the Union Chapel in Islington, London. Performers were Kid Harpoon, Lupen Crook, Kate Nash, Dan Treacy and the Television Personalities, Drew from Babyshambles, Ben from SixToes, Lucas from the Cazals and Mystery Jets. The groups created a special fanzine for the show with entries from all the performers and artwork by the bands.

December 2006 saw the band release "Umbrellahead / Half In Love With Elizabeth" through its Myspace site to competition winners. The two tracks were produced by Erol Alkan and were meant to be part of a ten-inch vinyl acoustic EP, but that idea was scrapped. Throughout 2007 the band wrote new songs (including "Hand Me Down", "Pink Elephant" and "Undercover Lover", the latter two being renamed "Veiled In Grey" and "Hideaway" and all three being included on their album Twenty One) and played more gigs around the world, especially in America, where they released their debut album Zootime (a collection of tracks from Making Dens, as well as EPs and singles) on 8 May, through Dim Mak Records. Henry Harrison decided to stop playing live with the band shortly afterwards, but is still very much involved and went into the studio with the rest of the band. He still helps with songwriting and occasionally makes onstage appearances. Henry has said, "I'm just another member, I'm one of five. I love it. That whole authority thing served a purpose and when it was done I was glad to relinquish it, because it got in the way of us working properly together."

=== Twenty One (2007–2008) ===
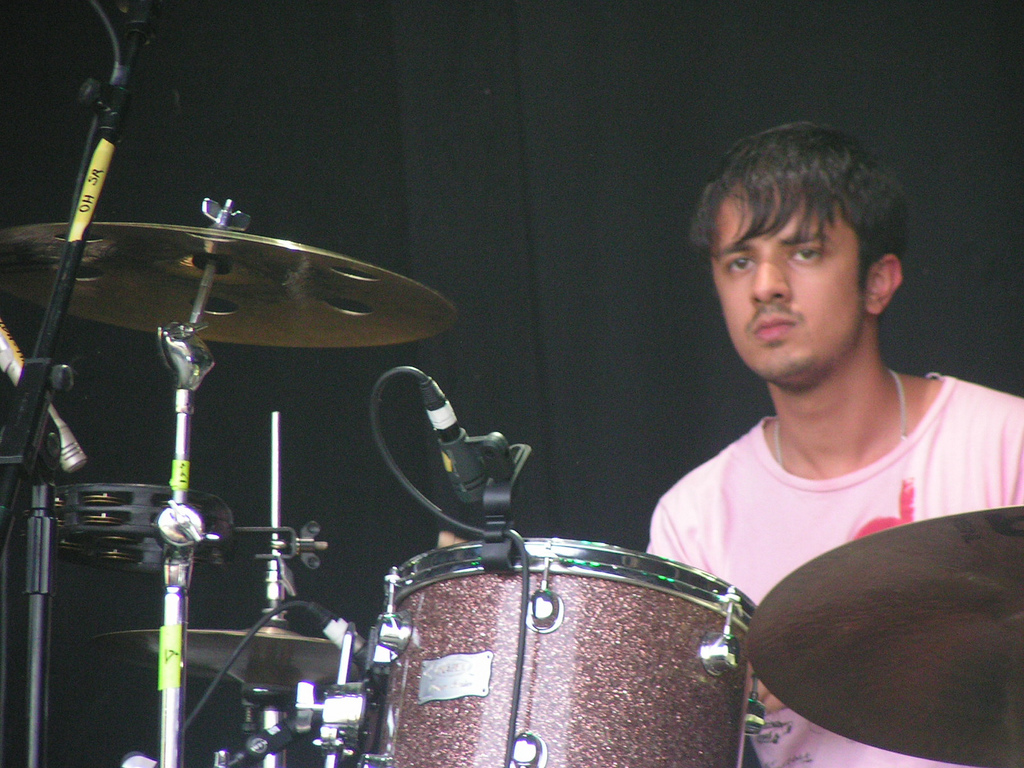
Kapil Trivedi performing with the band in 2008

At the end of 2007, the band went on a short club show across the UK, and released a free Christmas single, "Flakes".

Their second album, Twenty One, was released on 24 March 2008. Produced by Erol Alkan and mixed by producer Nick Launay, it was preceded by the single "Young Love" featuring Laura Marling, released on 10 March 2008. The second single released from the album was "Two Doors Down". It reached 24 in the U.K charts, their highest position so far. The album represented a change in the band's sound, shifting from psychedelic and progressive rock towards more of a pop direction.

On 8 June 2008, the band played at the Scottish RockNess music festival, which attracted over 35,000 music lovers. The band's set was broadcast on national UK broadcaster Hitz Radio. The band also spoke backstage about their rise to fame, reviving the eighties and how they plan to take over the world.

In 2008, Mystery Jets, along with Jeremy Warmsley and Adem, contributed the song "Grains of Sand" to the Survival International charity album Songs for Survival.

=== Serotonin (2009–2010) ===
In January 2009, Mystery Jets left their previous contract with 679 Recordings and signed a new deal with Rough Trade Records. They also began recording a new album and continued to tour. They performed at the Reading and Leeds Festivals at the end of August 2010.

In April 2010, Mystery Jets announced their third studio album, Serotonin. The album was released on 5 July 2010 and was produced by Chris Thomas. The working title was Luminescence but the name was changed later on. Blaine has said that he wanted this album to be "quintessential Mystery Jets record." A promotional single, entitled "Flash A Hungry Smile", was made available on the band's website for free. The first single to be released from the album, "Dreaming Of Another World", was added to BBC Radio 1's B Playlist in May 2010 and was also released on 5 July 2010. On 5 July, Mystery Jets performed an in-store session at Rough Trade East for their album release. A limited edition 12" was released as well as CD format and digital download. In 2010, the band featured on The Count & Sinden track "After Dark".

=== Radlands (2011–2013) ===
In March 2011, following a secret SXSW show, the band set up a home recording studio in a country house by the Colorado River of Texas in the Westlake area in Austin, Texas. Writing and recording sessions lasted two months, at the end of which the band returned to the UK to play the summer festivals. Blaine went to California in early July to get inspiration and imagery for the songs. On 22 November 2011, the Mystery Jets announced that their new album would be released in April 2012, with a tour to follow in May 2012. On 3 April 2012, shortly before the release of Radlands, it was announced that Kai Fish would be leaving the band, with bassist Pete Cochrane taking his place for the band's UK tour. On 15 February 2013, it was announced that the Mystery Jets would be performing at Y Not Festival in Derbyshire on Friday 2 August 2013.

=== Curve of the Earth (2016–2017) ===
On 30 September 2014, the Mystery Jets played a one-off show at the Barbican in London, along with Johnny Flynn & The Sussex Wit, Marika Hackman, Dry The River, and with Laura Marling as a special guest, to celebrate Transgressive Records' tenth anniversary. In a blog post on the band's official website following the show, Blaine Harrison announced that the band was "deep into the thick of album five sessions", and had completed building their own studio in a former button factory. Harrison also announced a new band member, bassist Jack Flanagan, had been officially incorporated into the band in January 2014.

On 20 October 2015, the band released a trailer announcing their fifth album, Curve of the Earth, which was released on 15 January 2016. The album's release was marked with a special one-off live show at London's ICA for competition winners and music journalists.

Following fellow British indie band The Maccabees' announcement that they would be splitting up, Mystery Jets were announced as special guests for their farewell shows on 17 January 2017, alongside IDLES. The run included two nights at Manchester's 02 Apollo and three nights at Alexandra Palace in London.

On 10 July 2017, the band announced they would perform a five-night residency, entitled 'Jetrospective', at London's iconic and newly refurbished venue The Garage, at which they would play their first five studio albums back to back: Making Dens, Twenty One, Serotonin, Radlands and Curve of the Earth. On 30 September 2017, the band announced the support acts for the sold-out run of shows, including Sundara Karma, Jade Bird, Marika Hackman and Blaenavon.

=== A Billion Heartbeats (2019–2020) ===
In August 2019, the band announced their album A Billion Heartbeats. According to Clash magazine, the album was inspired by recent large protest marches in London, and "the continuing politicisation of British youth". The band planned to release the album on 27 September 2019, but the release was postponed after Blaine Harrison underwent emergency surgery to tackle a severe infection. The album was finally released digitally on 3 April 2020, but the physical release was delayed until 26 June 2020 due to the COVID-19 pandemic.

On 4 February 2020, founding member, guitarist and vocalist of the band William Rees announced his departure from the band via an emotional post on the band's Social media.

On 26 May 2020, the band announced they would be launching their own podcast series with Acast, 'Things Worth Fighting For', to coincide with the songs and themes of the album. The series features Blaine teaming up with artists, activists and authors to discuss topics such as the Grenfell Tower blaze, racial and class discrimination in Britain, homelessness, the National Health Service, toxic masculinity and mental health in the digital age. Guests announced for the series include Joe Talbot (Idles), Billy Bragg, Ed O'Brien (Radiohead), Renni Eddo-Lodge, Nikesh Shukla and co-founder of the NGO Help Refugees (now called Choose Love) Josie Naughton.

In April 2023, the band announced a brand new song, "You, Me and the Sea", written and recorded especially for Earth Day 2023. The song was released as part of a bandcamp compilation (alongside Coldplay, R.E.M's Michael Stipe, Nile Rodgers and many more), available for 2 weeks only and raised money for the climate justice organisation Earth Percent, co-founded by one of the band's heroes, Brian Eno.

A Hole To See The Sky Through (2026)

After teasing comeback track ‘Black Sage’, Mystery Jets announced the release of their seventh studio album, A Hole To See The Sky Through on 18 May, 2026.

== Members ==
=== Current members ===
- Blaine Harrison – vocals, keyboards, guitar
- Kapil Trivedi – drums
- Henry Harrison – lyrics
- Ollie Taylor – guitar, vocals
- Eddie Taylor – bass, vocals

=== Former members ===
- Tamara Pearce-Higgins – keyboards, vocals (1996-2002)
- William Rees – guitar, vocals (1996-2020)
- Kai Fish – bass, vocals (2001-2012)
- Henry Harrison – keyboards, guitar, vocals (2001-2007)
- Peter Cochrane – bass (2012-2014)
- Matt Park – pedal steel (2012-2014)
- Jack Flanagan – bass, vocals (2014-2022)

== Discography ==
=== Studio albums ===
List of albums, with selected chart positions and certifications
Title	Details	Peak chart positions			Certifications
Title	Details	UK	UK Indie	SCO	Certifications
Making Dens	Released: 6 March 2006; Label: 679 Recordings	32	—	34	
Zootime	Released: 8 May 2007; Label: Dim Mak Records; Note: US only release	—	—	—	
Twenty One	Released: 24 March 2008; Label: 679 Recordings	42	21	96	BPI: Silver
Serotonin	Released: 5 July 2010; Label: Rough Trade	42	3	—	
Radlands	Released: 30 April 2012; Label: Rough Trade	40	6	74	
Curve of the Earth	Released: 15 January 2016; Label: Caroline International	30	—	67	
A Billion Heartbeats	Released: 3 April 2020; Label: Caroline International	85	—	30	
A Hole to See the Sky Through	Released: 21 August 2026; Label: Fiction	65	4	13	
"—" denotes a release that did not chart or was not released in that territory.

=== Live albums ===
List of live albums with selected details
Title	Details
Live at the Royal Festival Hall	Released 19 April 2013; Label: Transgressive

=== EPs ===
- Eel Pie Island (2003, Liquid Sky Music)
- Flotsam and Jetsam EP (9 May 2006, 679 Recordings)
- Diamonds in the Dark (4 September 2006, 679 Recordings)
- The Whole Earth (16 September 2016, Caroline International)
- The Button Factory Sessions (25 July 2016, Caroline International)
- Electronic Earth (9 June 2017, Caroline International)
- Live to Vinyl (26 October 2018, Metropolis)

=== Singles ===
Single	Year	Peak chart positions					Certifications	Album
Single	Year	UK	UK Indie	EUR	MEX	SCO	Certifications	Album
"Zoo Time"	2005	—	—	—	—	—		Making Dens
"On My Feet" ^{[A]}	2005	—	—	—	—	—		Making Dens
"You Can't Fool Me Dennis"	2005	44	—	—	—	40		Making Dens
"Alas Agnes"	2005	34	—	100	—	35		Making Dens
"The Boy Who Ran Away"	2006	23	—	83	—	27		Making Dens
"You Can't Fool Me Dennis" (re-release)	2006	41	—	—	—	29		Making Dens
"Diamonds in the Dark"	2006	47	—	—	—	37		Making Dens
"Young Love" (featuring Laura Marling)	2008	34	—	99	—	19	BPI: Silver	Twenty-One
"Two Doors Down"	2008	24	—	74	—	25	BPI: Silver	Twenty-One
"Half in Love with Elizabeth"	2008	107	—	—	—	35		Twenty-One
"Dreaming of Another World"	2010	—	22	—	—	—		Serotonin
"Show Me the Light"	2010	—	—	—	—	—		Serotonin
"After Dark" (The Count & Sinden featuring The Mystery Jets)	2010	47	2	—	—	46		Mega Mega Mega
"Serotonin"	2011	—	—	—	—	—		Serotonin
"Someone Purer"	2012	—	—	—	—	—		Radlands
"Greatest Hits"	2012	—	—	—	42	—		Radlands
"Telomere"	2015	—	—	—	—	—		Curve of the Earth
"Bubblegum"	2016	—	—	—	—	—		Curve of the Earth
"Hospital Radio"	2019	—	—	—	—	—		A Billion Heartbeats
"Screwdriver"	2019	—	—	—	—	—		A Billion Heartbeats
"History Has Its Eyes On You"	2019	—	—	—	—	—		A Billion Heartbeats
"Wrong Side of the Tracks"	2019	—	—	—	—	—		A Billion Heartbeats
"Petty Drone"	2020	—	—	—	—	—		A Billion Heartbeats
"Black Sage"	2026	—	—	—	—	—		
"—" denotes a release that did not chart or has not been released

- ^{A} - Although the single does not actually feature on the album Making Dens, the track entitled "Summertime Dens" is a continuation.

==== 7" special limited ====
- Powercut Serenades (Signed with "Umbrellahead" and "Half In Love With the Radio" on. Limited edition of 300 copies all given away to competition winners)

==== Early demos ====
- Mystery Jets EP (2001, self released CD)
- Christmas Sessions EP (2003, self released CD)
