= Making Dens =

Studio album by Mystery Jets
- Released: 6 March 2006
- Length: 44:38
- Label: 679 Recordings
- Producer: James Ford; Mystery Jets

Mystery Jets chronology
Making Dens (2006)	Zootime (2007)

Professional ratings
Aggregate scores
Source	Rating
Metacritic	74/100
Review scores
Source	Rating
AllMusic	3.5/5 stars
Drowned in Sound	9/10
NME	7/10
Pitchfork	7.7/10
Uncut	4/5 stars

Making Dens is the debut album from Mystery Jets, released in the UK on 6 March 2006. Tracks on the album include previous singles "Alas Agnes", "You Can't Fool Me Dennis" and "Zoo Time" (the last two of which have been re-recorded). "The Boy Who Ran Away" was released as a single from the album on 27 February 2006, while "Diamonds in the Dark" was released as an EP on 4 September 2006.

"The Boy Who Ran Away" is the third single taken from this album, released in February 2006. The single gained them their only appearance on Top of the Pops. It peaked at #23 on the UK Singles Chart.

== Track listing ==
All tracks written by Mystery Jets.

1. "Intro" – 0:43
2. "You Can't Fool Me Dennis" – 3:32
3. "Purple Prose" – 4:03
4. "Soluble in Air" – 3:12
5. "The Boy Who Ran Away" – 2:57
6. "Summertime Den" – 1:14
7. "Horse Drawn Cart" – 5:00
8. "Zoo Time" – 4:01
9. "Little Bag of Hair" – 5:20
10. "Diamonds in the Dark" – 3:57
11. "Alas Agnes" – 3:51
12. "Making Dens" – 6:48
