= Twenty One (Mystery Jets album) =

Studio album by Mystery Jets
- Released: 24 March 2008
- Genre: Indie rock
- Length: 53:47
- Label: 679 Recordings
- Producers: Erol Alkan and Stephen Street

Mystery Jets chronology
Zootime (2007)	Twenty One (2008)	Serotonin (2010)

Alternative covers

Professional ratings
Aggregate scores
Source	Rating
Metacritic	75/100
Review scores
Source	Rating
AllMusic	4.5/5 stars
BBC	(favourable)
Drowned in Sound	9/10
Gigwise	4/5 stars
The Guardian	4/5 stars
The Independent	(favourable)
MusicOMH	4/5 stars
NME	7/10
PopMatters	7/10
The Sunday Times	2/5 stars
Yahoo Music	8/10 stars

Twenty One is the second studio album by Mystery Jets, released in the UK on 24 March 2008.

The first single from the album, "Young Love" featuring Laura Marling, was released on 10 March 2008.

The album originally reached #50 in the UK Albums Chart but was hastily rereleased with an additional cover of Aztec Camera's hit single "Somewhere in My Heart" to coincide with the release of eighties-themed single "Two Doors Down" (featuring sax by Nik Carter), which peaked at #24 in the UK Singles Chart. This new version of the album peaked at #42 in the charts.

"Young Love", "Two Doors Down" and "Half in Love with Elizabeth" were released as singles. All three songs, in addition to "Flakes" (which was released as a free download of the week via the UK iTunes Store) had music videos shot for them. The 7" vinyl EP of "Half in Love with Elizabeth" features the band performing "Flakes" with Florence Welch of Florence + the Machine performing vocals, this one of her earliest releases, following the release of her first single "Kiss with a Fist" by only a few months.

== Track listing ==
No.	Title	Length
1.	"Hideaway"	3:32
2.	"Young Love" (featuring Laura Marling)	3:22
3.	"Half in Love with Elizabeth"	3:20
4.	"Flakes"	4:23
5.	"Veiled in Grey"	3:55
6.	"Two Doors Down"	3:36
7.	"MJ"	3:50
8.	"Umbrellahead"	3:10
9.	"Hand Me Down"	4:03
10.	"First to Know"	4:15
11.	"Behind the Bunhouse" (Includes "Twenty One" Hidden Track)	12:12
12.	"Somewhere in my Heart" (UK bonus track)	4:03
Total length:		53:47
