= List of Billboard number-one dance songs of 2014 =

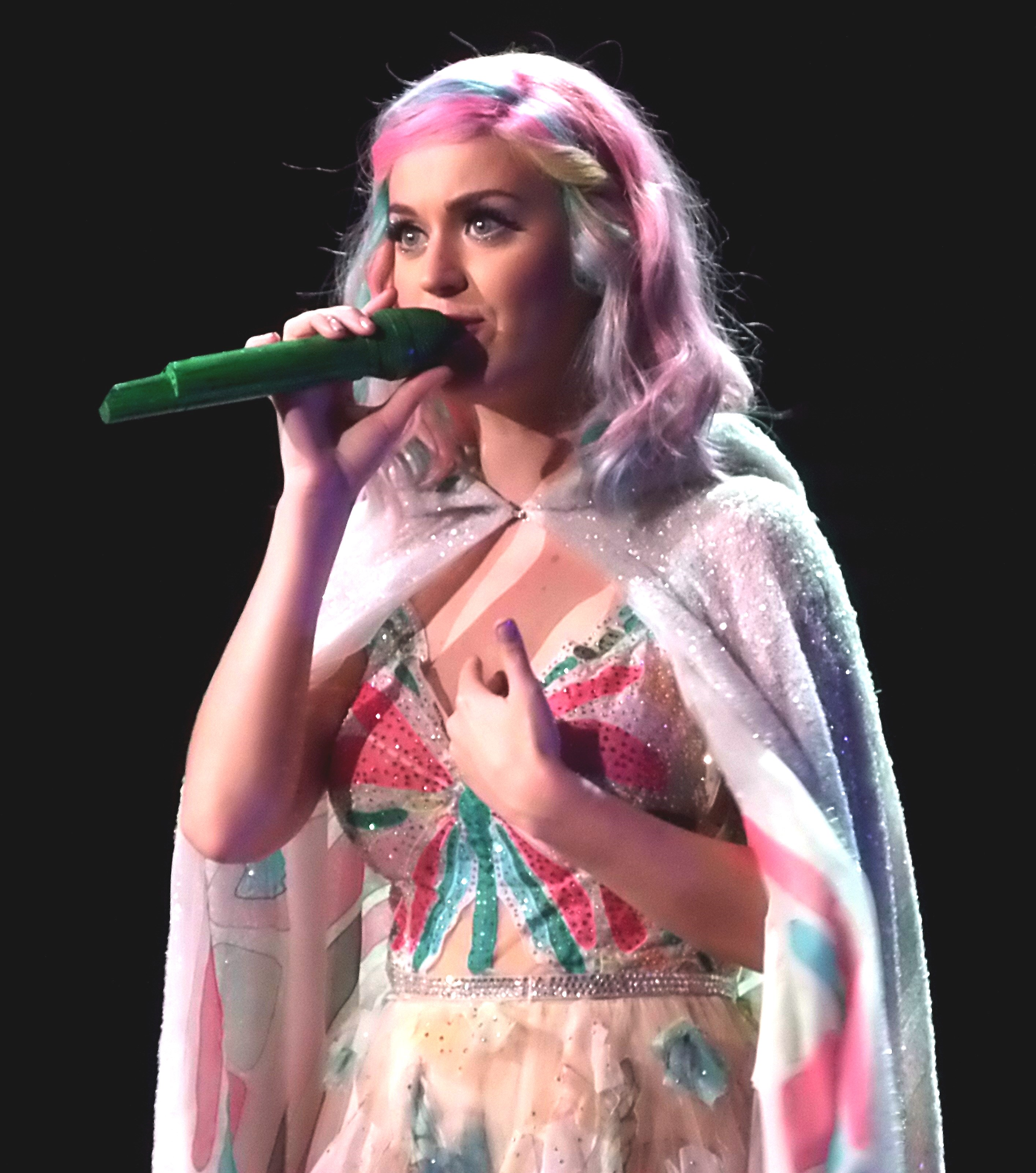
Katy Perry collected four number-one songs in 2014 with "Unconditionally", "Dark Horse", "Birthday" and "This Is How We Do".

Billboard magazine compiled the top-performing dance songs in the United States during 2014 on the Hot Dance/Electronic Songs, the Dance Club Songs, and the Dance/Mix Show Airplay. The oldest dance music chart, the Dance Club Songs was first published in 1976, ranking the most popular songs on dance club based on reports from a national sample of club DJs. The Dance/Mix Show Airplay was launched in 2003, ranking songs based on airplay detections on dance radio, as well as mix-show plays on top 40 radio and select rhythmic radio as measured by Mediabase. Premiered on January 26, 2013, the Hot Dance/Electronic Songs is a multi-metric chart ranking songs based on streaming, sales, and airplay audience impressions from radio stations of all formats.

The first number-one song of 2014 on the Dance Club Songs chart was "Unconditionally" by Katy Perry. With remixes by Syn Cole, Manufactured Superstars, Tracy Young and Country Club Martini Crew, it became her twelfth consecutive chart topper, extending her own record for the most number-ones in a row in the thirty-seven year history of the chart. Perry achieved a further three number one singles during the year – "Dark Horse" featuring Juicy J, "Birthday" and "This Is How We Do" – with the last becoming her record-extending fifteenth consecutive number-one. Beyoncé was one of three acts to top the chart three times, beginning with "Blow", then "Partition" and her twenty-second in total, "Pretty Hurts". Iggy Azalea and Dave Audé achieved three number-ones; the former with "Fancy" featuring Charli XCX, "Black Widow" featuring Rita Ora and "Booty", a collaboration with Jennifer Lopez, and Audé with "Take Me Away", "Aftermath (Here We Go)" and "Hustlin'". Demi Lovato topped the chart twice with "Neon Lights" and "Really Don't Care" featuring Cher Lloyd. "Somebody Loves You" became Betty Who's first song to top the chart. Jennifer Lopez's hit streak of 11 number ones was broken with the release of "I Luh Ya Papi" but follow up with another number one "First Love" and her collaboration with Azalea.

Fedde Le Grand and Gregor Salto & Funkin Matt produced remixes of Mariah Carey's song "You're Mine (Eternal)", garnering the singer her seventeenth number-one since she first topped the chart with "Someday" in 1991. "Painkillr", by Erika Jayne, became her seventh consecutive number-one on the chart. In addition to "Black Widow", Ora's own "I Will Never Let You Down" topped the chart in June. Enrique Iglesias became the male artist with the most number-one songs in history, with "Bailando" featuring Descemer Bueno and Gente de Zona becoming his thirteenth. "Can't Remember to Forget You", a song by Shakira featuring Rihanna, became the former's sixth and the latter's twenty-second number-one in April, making Rihanna the second artist with the most entries after Madonna. Shakira also topped the chart with "Dare (La La La)" in July. Zhu's song "Faded" topped the chart on December 20. A writer for Complex was surprised that the song only reached number-one in December despite being commercially released in September, writing "While I'd love to say that it's because the song is just that damn good (which it is), Billboard says it's been helped by the number of remixes from Odesza, Amtrac, and The Magician." "Never Say Never" by Basement Jaxx became the most-played track of the year from the national sample, ranking atop the Dance Club Songs 2014 year-end chart.

== Chart history ==
Key
†	Indicates top-performing song of 2014.

Chart history
Issue date	Hot Dance/Electronic Songs			Dance Club Songs			Dance/Mix Show Airplay		
Issue date	Song	Artist(s)	Ref.	Song	Artist(s)	Ref.	Song	Artist(s)	Ref.
January 4	"Wake Me Up"	Avicii		"Unconditionally"	Katy Perry		"Stay the Night"	Zedd featuring Hayley Williams of Paramore	
January 11	"Wake Me Up"	Avicii		"Lie to Me"	Cole Plante featuring Myon & Shane 54 and Koko LaRoo		"Stay the Night"	Zedd featuring Hayley Williams of Paramore	
January 18	"Wake Me Up"	Avicii		"Timber"	Pitbull featuring Kesha		"Stay the Night"	Zedd featuring Hayley Williams of Paramore	
January 25	"Wake Me Up"	Avicii		"Higher"	Deborah Cox featuring Paige		"Stay the Night"	Zedd featuring Hayley Williams of Paramore	
February 1	"Wake Me Up"	Avicii		"Neon Lights"	Demi Lovato		"Stay the Night"	Zedd featuring Hayley Williams of Paramore	
February 8	"Wake Me Up"	Avicii		"Pompeii"	Bastille		"Stay the Night"	Zedd featuring Hayley Williams of Paramore	
February 15	"Wake Me Up"	Avicii		"Go Fuck Yourself"	My Crazy Girlfriend		"Stay the Night"	Zedd featuring Hayley Williams of Paramore	
February 22	"Wake Me Up"	Avicii		"Dark Horse"	Katy Perry featuring Juicy J		"Burn"	Ellie Goulding	
March 1	"Wake Me Up"	Avicii		"Hey Brother"	Avicii		"Red Lights"	Tiësto	
March 8	"Wake Me Up"	Avicii		"Somebody Loves You"	Betty Who		"Red Lights"	Tiësto	
March 15	"Wake Me Up"	Avicii		"Hands Up in the Air"	Audio Playground		"Red Lights"	Tiësto	
March 22	"Hey Brother"	Avicii		"Blow"	Beyoncé		"Red Lights"	Tiësto	
March 29	"#SELFIE"	The Chainsmokers		"Take Me Away"	Rokelle featuring Dave Audé		"Red Lights"	Tiësto	
April 5	"#SELFIE"	The Chainsmokers		"Can't Remember to Forget You"	Shakira featuring Rihanna		"Red Lights"	Tiësto	
April 12	"Turn Down for What" †	DJ Snake and Lil Jon		"Into the Blue"	Kylie Minogue		"Red Lights"	Tiësto	
April 19	"Turn Down for What" †	DJ Snake and Lil Jon		"Find You"	Zedd, Matthew Koma, Miriam Bryant		"Red Lights"	Tiësto	
April 26	"Turn Down for What" †	DJ Snake and Lil Jon		"Shiny Disco Balls"	Scotty Boy featuring Sue Cho		"Red Lights"	Tiësto	
May 3	"Turn Down for What" †	DJ Snake and Lil Jon		"Say Something"	A Great Big World and Christina Aguilera		"Red Lights"	Tiësto	
May 10	"Turn Down for What" †	DJ Snake and Lil Jon		"You're Mine (Eternal)"	Mariah Carey		"Red Lights"	Tiësto	
May 17	"Turn Down for What" †	DJ Snake and Lil Jon		"Partition"	Beyoncé		"Summer"†	Calvin Harris	
May 24	"Turn Down for What" †	DJ Snake and Lil Jon		"Addicted to You"	Avicii		"Summer"†	Calvin Harris	
May 31	"Turn Down for What" †	DJ Snake and Lil Jon		"Warrior"	Havana Brown		"Summer"†	Calvin Harris	
June 7	"Turn Down for What" †	DJ Snake and Lil Jon		"I Got U"	Duke Dumont featuring Jax Jones		"Summer"†	Calvin Harris	
June 14	"Turn Down for What" †	DJ Snake and Lil Jon		"Let It Go"	Idina Menzel		"Summer"†	Calvin Harris	
June 21	"Turn Down for What" †	DJ Snake and Lil Jon		"Birthday"	Katy Perry		"Summer"†	Calvin Harris	
June 28	"Turn Down for What" †	DJ Snake and Lil Jon		"I Will Never Let You Down"	Rita Ora		"Summer"†	Calvin Harris	
July 5	"Summer"	Calvin Harris		"Fancy"	Iggy Azalea featuring Charli XCX		"Summer"†	Calvin Harris	
July 12	"Summer"	Calvin Harris		"A Sky Full of Stars"	Coldplay		"Summer"†	Calvin Harris	
July 19	"Summer"	Calvin Harris		"Dare (La La La)"	Shakira		"Summer"†	Calvin Harris	
July 26	"Summer"	Calvin Harris		"Knock You Out"	Bingo Players		"Summer"†	Calvin Harris	
August 2	"Latch"	Disclosure featuring Sam Smith		"Derezzed (2014)"	Daft Punk featuring Negin		"Summer"†	Calvin Harris	
August 9	"Latch"	Disclosure featuring Sam Smith		"Aftermath (Here We Go)"	Dave Audé featuring Andy Bell		"Summer"†	Calvin Harris	
August 16	"Latch"	Disclosure featuring Sam Smith		"Chandelier"	Sia		"Waves"	Mr. Probz	
August 23	"Latch"	Disclosure featuring Sam Smith		"Do It Again"	Röyksopp and Robyn		"Am I Wrong"	Nico & Vinz	
August 30	"Break Free"	Ariana Grande featuring Zedd		"Pretty Hurts"	Beyoncé		"Waves"	Mr. Probz	
September 6	"Break Free"	Ariana Grande featuring Zedd		"Really Don't Care"	Demi Lovato featuring Cher Lloyd		"Five Hours (Don't Hold Me Back)"	Deorro featuring DyCy	
September 13	"Break Free"	Ariana Grande featuring Zedd		"First Love"	Jennifer Lopez		"Rather Be"	Clean Bandit featuring Jess Glynne	
September 20	"Break Free"	Ariana Grande featuring Zedd		"Never Say Never" †	Basement Jaxx		"Break Free"	Ariana Grande featuring Zedd	
September 27	"Break Free"	Ariana Grande featuring Zedd		"Painkillr"	Erika Jayne		"Boom Clap"	Charli XCX	
October 4	"Break Free"	Ariana Grande featuring Zedd		"Black Widow"	Iggy Azalea featuring Rita Ora		"Break Free"	Ariana Grande featuring Zedd	
October 11	"Break Free"	Ariana Grande featuring Zedd		"Shelter Me"	Lee Dagger featuring Inaya Day		"Break Free"	Ariana Grande featuring Zedd	
October 18	"Break Free"	Ariana Grande featuring Zedd		"Bailando"	Enrique Iglesias featuring Descemer Bueno and Gente de Zona		"Black Widow"	Iggy Azalea featuring Rita Ora	
October 25	"Break Free"	Ariana Grande featuring Zedd		"Won't Look Back"	Duke Dumont		"Black Widow"	Iggy Azalea featuring Rita Ora	
November 1	"Rather Be"	Clean Bandit featuring Jess Glynne		"Parachute"	Olivia Somerlyn		"Black Widow"	Iggy Azalea featuring Rita Ora	
November 8	"Rather Be"	Clean Bandit featuring Jess Glynne		"Angel"	Ono		"Blame"	Calvin Harris featuring John Newman	
November 15	"Rather Be"	Clean Bandit featuring Jess Glynne		"This Is How We Do"	Katy Perry		"Blame"	Calvin Harris featuring John Newman	
November 22	"Blame"	Calvin Harris featuring John Newman		"Secrets"	Mary Lambert		"Blame"	Calvin Harris featuring John Newman	
November 29	"Waves"	Mr. Probz		"Hustlin'"	Vassy, Crazibiza and Dave Audé		"Blame"	Calvin Harris featuring John Newman	
December 6	"Waves"	Mr. Probz		"Booty"	Jennifer Lopez featuring Iggy Azalea or Pitbull		"Blame"	Calvin Harris featuring John Newman	
December 13	"Waves"	Mr. Probz		"Heroes (We Could Be)"	Alesso featuring Tove Lo		"Blame"	Calvin Harris featuring John Newman	
December 20	"Waves"	Mr. Probz		"Faded"	Zhu		"Heroes (We Could Be)"	Alesso featuring Tove Lo	
December 27	"Waves"	Mr. Probz		"Animals"	Nabiha		"Heroes (We Could Be)"	Alesso featuring Tove Lo	

== See also ==
- 2014 in American music
- List of Billboard Hot 100 number ones of 2014
