= Tell Me a Lie (disambiguation) =

"Tell Me a Lie" is a 1974 song by Lynn Anderson, covered by Sami Jo (1974) and Janie Fricke (1983).

Tell Me a Lie may also refer to:

- Tell Me a Lie, a 1982 album by Bettye LaVette
- "Tell Me a Lie", a 1995 song by Jim Johnston from WWE Anthology
- "Tell Me a Lie", a 2008 song by the Fratellis from Here We Stand
- "Tell Me a Lie", a 2011 song by One Direction from Up All Night
- Tell Me a Lie, a 2007 manga by Gosho Aoyama

== See also ==
- Tell Me Lies (disambiguation)
- Lie to Me (disambiguation)
