= Tell Me Lies =

Tell Me Lies may refer to:

- Tell Me Lies (film), a 1968 documentary film
- Tell Me Lies (TV series), a 2022 drama series
- "Tell Me Lies", a 2024 song by Asteria and Odetari
- "Tell Me Lies", a 1997 song by Natalie Cole featured in the film Cats Don't Dance

== See also ==
- "Little Lies", a 1987 song by Fleetwood Mac
- Tell Me a Lie (disambiguation)
- Lie to Me (disambiguation)
