= Photodom =

Photo and video equipment store in Brooklyn, NY

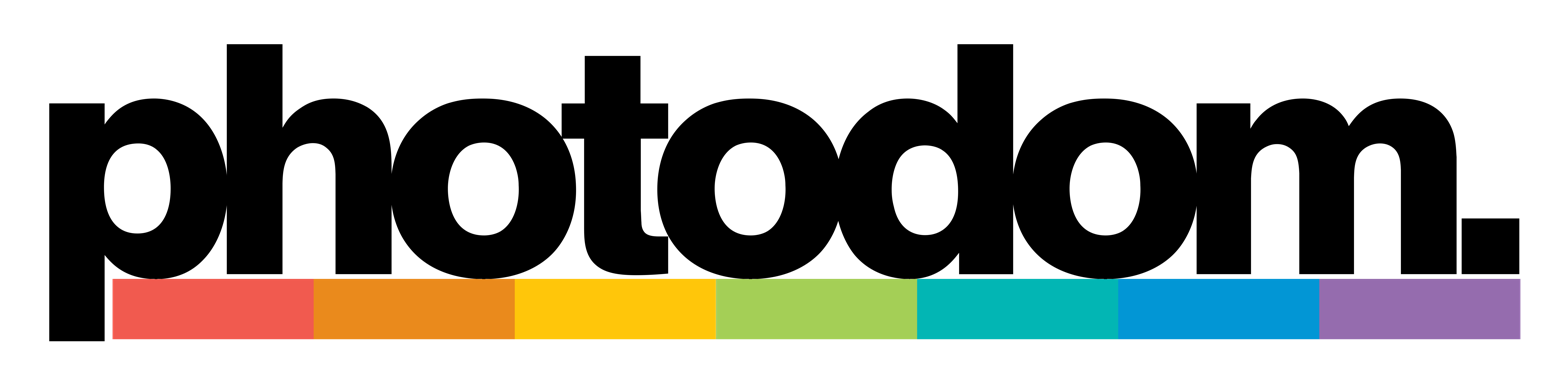
- Type: Private
- Industry: Retail
- Founded: 2016; 10 years ago Manhattan, New York, U.S.
- Founders: Dominick Lewis
- Headquarters: New York City, New York, U.S. 40°41′01″N 73°54′40″W
- Number of locations: 1
- Products: Cameras, video, film, audio, computers, electronics
- Owner: Dominick Lewis
- Website: photodom.shop

Photodom is a Black-owned analog-focused camera store based in Brooklyn, New York. The aim of the store is to create a place for people who appreciate Black photography and make photography gear affordable to communities that do not otherwise have access to them.

== History ==
As a 26-year-old Flatbush resident and photographer, Dominick Lewis founded Photodom. One of Lewis' motivations for opening Photodom is to document the Brooklyn immigrant community and their stories.

When Lewis was eighteen years old, he bought a camera as a graduate present to himself. He dropped out of engineering school to pursue photography, but encountered several career setbacks such as a failed photography business. His lessons from these setbacks helped him focus Photodom to be a bridge for sustaining a community that doesn't typically afford expensive cameras.

In July 2020, Lewis created a GoFundMe to raise funds for a store and reached their funding goal in less than 48 hours.

Photodom has announced the Photodom Grant Program, a monthly $1,000 grant for artists to invest projects they want to create.

In September 2020, Lewis opened up a brick and mortar shop in Brooklyn with Lewis' friends being the first employees to help with customer service, making clothing, and one friend offering their dark room. Lewis is among other local Black entrepreneurs who turned their hobbies into businesses during the COVID-19 pandemic.

== Reception ==
The community generally supports Photodom's success. Upon the store opening, one customer "waited in line 'for over an hour' but loved how 'nice' everyone was and how affordable the cameras are". A friend of Lewis' shares that their "favorite thing about this is that it's all for the community". Brooklyn-based photographer and staff educator at the Metropolitan Museum of Art, Jeary Payne, comments that, “to see the idea [Lewis] had become tangible is dope and affirming". Moreover, Dee Williams, a Black photographer and former Brooklynite, shares "It’s been a blessing to support and buy from a space that doesn’t see me or my art as an outsider".

== See also ==
- B&H Photo
