= Shiny Disco Balls =

2002 single by Who Da Funk

Single by Who Da Funk featuring Jessica Eve
- Released: 28 June 2002
- Length: 6:44 (main mix); 3:15 (radio edit)
- Label: Subusa
- Songwriters: Alex Alicea; Jorge "DJ Lace" Jaramillo
- Producer: Who Da Funk

"Shiny Disco Balls" is a song by Who Da Funk featuring Jessica Eve (wife of Harry "Choo Choo" Romero) on vocals. The single was written and produced by Jorge Mario Jaramillo and co-produced by Alex Alicea. "Shiny Disco Balls" reached number 15 on the UK Singles Chart, number nine in Greece, and number 24 in Australia, where it was the most successful club hit of 2002. In addition, it topped the UK Dance Singles Chart for two weeks and reached the top 30 on the US Billboard Dance Club Play chart.

== Track listings ==
UK CD single
No.	Title	Length
1.	"Shiny Disco Balls" (radio edit)	3:15
2.	"Shiny Disco Balls" (main mix)	6:44
3.	"Shiny Disco Balls" (Doublefunk's 'Thrill Her' remix)	8:11

US Amazon download
No.	Title	Length
1.	"Shiny Disco Balls" (main mix)	6:46

== Charts ==
=== Weekly charts ===
Chart (2002–2003)	Peak position
Australia (ARIA)	24
Australian Club Chart (ARIA)	1
Australian Dance (ARIA)	4
Europe (Eurochart Hot 100)	56
Greece (IFPI)	9
Ireland (IRMA)	23
Ireland Dance (IRMA)	3
Scotland Singles (Official Charts)	10
UK Singles (Official Charts)	15
UK Dance (Official Charts)	1
UK Indie (Official Charts)	16
US Dance Club Play (Billboard)	28

=== Year-end charts ===
Chart (2002)	Position
Australian Club Chart (ARIA)	1
Chart (2003)	Position
Australian Dance (ARIA)	13

== Release history ==
Region	Date	Format(s)	Label(s)	Ref.
United States	28 June 2002	12-inch vinyl	Subusa	
United Kingdom	21 October 2002	12-inch vinyl; CD	Cream	
Australia	18 November 2002	CD	Superphunk	

== Scotty Boy version ==
"Shiny Disco Balls"

Single by Scotty Boy featuring Sue Cho
- Released: 2014
- Genre: Dance
- Length: 5:37 (original version); 3:42 (radio edit)
- Producer: Scotty Boy

In 2014, a new version of the song was recorded by Scotty Boy, featuring vocals by Sue Cho. The remake went to number one on the US Billboard Dance Club Songs chart. The music video was directed by Drex Lee.

=== Track listing ===
US iTunes download
No.	Title	Length
1.	"Shiny Disco Balls" (original mix)	5:37
2.	"Shiny Disco Balls" (radio edit)	3:42

=== Charts ===
Chart (2014)	Peak position
US Dance Club Songs (Billboard)	1

== See also ==
- List of number-one dance singles of 2014 (U.S.)
