= Won't Look Back (song) =

Single by Duke Dumont

from the album EP1
- Released: 31 August 2014
- Recorded: 2014
- Genre: Deep house; tech house
- Length: 3:23
- Songwriter(s): Duke Dumont; Jax Jones; Naomi Miller
- Producer(s): Duke Dumont; Jax Jones

Duke Dumont singles chronology
"I Got U" (2014)	"Won't Look Back" (2014)	"The Giver (Reprise)" (2015)

Music video
- "Won't Look Back" on YouTube

"Won't Look Back" is a 2014 single by Duke Dumont. The song was written and produced by Duke Dumont and frequent collaborator Jax Jones. It was co-written by Naomi Miller and features uncredited vocals from Yolanda Quartey. The song was released on 31 August 2014 on iTunes. It is included on Duke Dumont's EP EP1, which was released in North America.

== Music video ==
A music video for the song features three robbers stealing money from a jewelry store owner (played by Rene Napoli) on pogo sticks and whilst wearing face masks consisting of the royal family members. The trio split up when a police officer on duty catches them showboating over a broken down car and chases them on a Segway.

He arrests one robber by cornering him by a fence. The other one he catches by stealing the remote off a child's remote-controlled car and by driving the small car under the pogo stick in order for the pogo to tip. The video ends on a cliffhanger when the last robber jumps off the top of a car parking building, as the officer looks on in surprise, leaving a "To Be Continued..." on the screen as the sound of a helicopter can be heard.

== Critical reception ==
4Music gave particular praise to the vocalist of the song, saying "If Duke Dumont is watching, could you please tell us who the amazing vocalist is on this track? She deserves a credit!."

== Charts and certifications ==
The song debuted at number 169 on the UK Singles Chart in its first week. After the full download release, "Won't Look Back" catapulted 167 places straight to number two, becoming Dumont's third major release and his first single to miss the top spot.

=== Weekly charts ===
Chart (2014)	Peak position
Australia (ARIA)	37
Belgium (Ultratip Bubbling Under Flanders)	4
Belgium (Ultratip Bubbling Under Wallonia)	8
France (SNEP)	180
Germany (GfK)	41
Hungary (Dance Top 40)	19
Hungary (Rádiós Top 40)	2
Poland (Dance Top 50)	10
Scotland (OCC)	3
Switzerland (Schweizer Hitparade)	60
UK Singles (OCC)	2
UK Dance (OCC)	2
US Hot Dance/Electronic Songs (Billboard)	19
US Dance Club Songs (Billboard)	1

=== Year-end charts ===
Chart (2014)	Position
Hungary (Rádiós Top 40)	30
US Dance Club Songs (Billboard)	34

Chart (2015)	Position
Hungary (Dance Top 40)	74

=== Certifications ===
Region	Certification	Certified units/sales
United Kingdom (BPI)	Gold	400,000^{‡}
^{‡} Sales+streaming figures based on certification alone.

== See also ==
- List of number-one dance singles of 2014 (U.S.)
