= Drex Lee =

American film director and internet celebrity (born 1984)

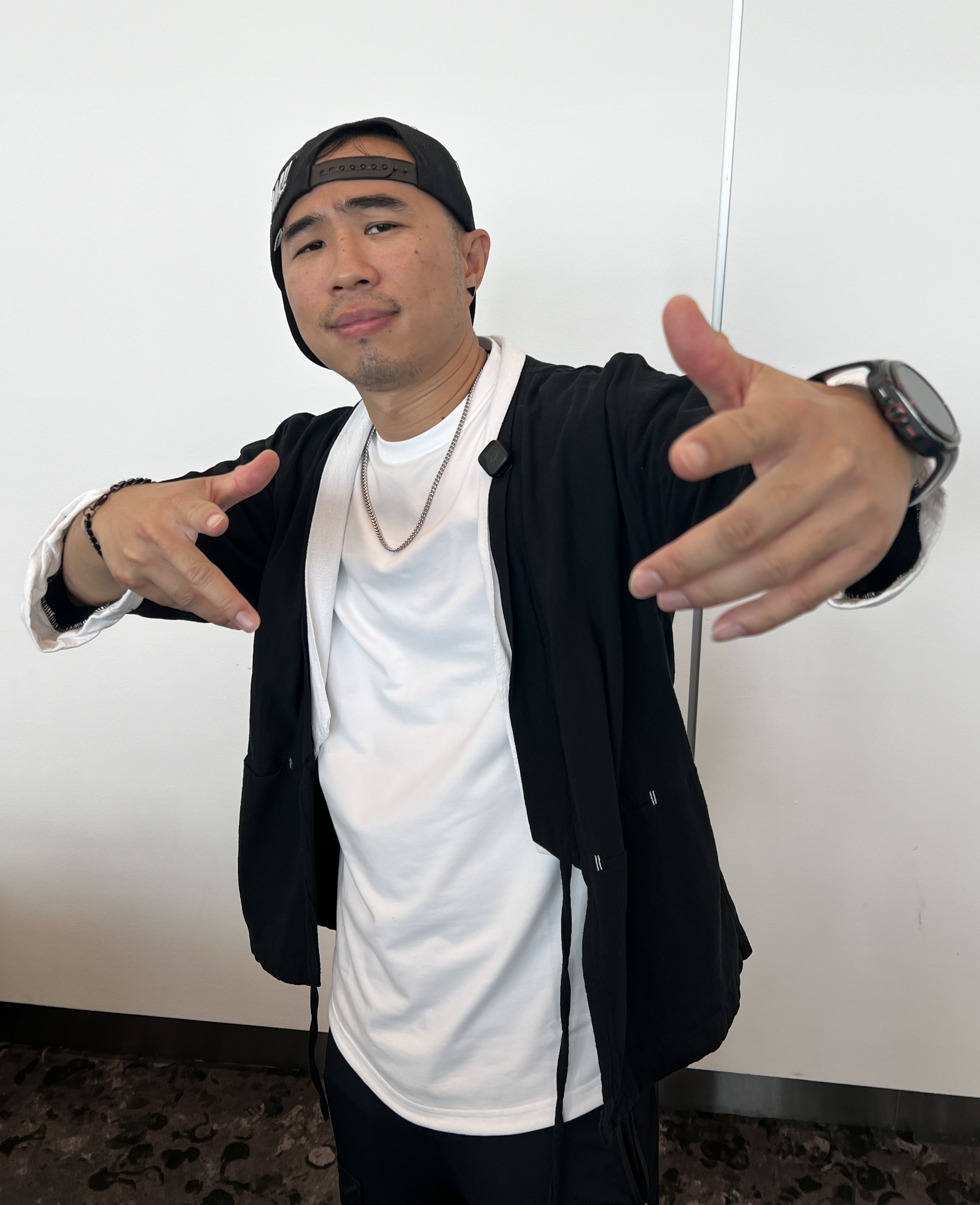
- Drex Lee, 2025 at the Bild Expo
- Born: November 7, 1984 (age 40); Stockton, California, U.S.
- Occupations: Director; Social Media Personality

Instagram information
- Page: drexlee
- Years active: 11 years
- Genre: Film Making
- Followers: 3.9 million

TikTok information
- Page: drexlee
- Genre: Film Making
- Followers: 8 million

YouTube information
- Channel: drexlee
- Years active: 15 years
- Genre: Film Making
- Subscribers: 4.82 million
- Views: 1.6 billion

Drex Lee (born November 7, 1984) is a Stockton, California-based film director and social media influencer who specializes in mobile phone filmmaking or mobile filmmaking.

As of June 2025, he had 8 billion accumulated views across four platforms. He has received acclaim for his Epic 1 Shot shooting style, similar to a One-shot film using a smartphone. His work offers visual storytelling over dialogue, a unique, visual style, and emphasis on action. His videos are educational, initially outlining his Epic 1 Shot shooting technique, then showing viewers the final product. Due to his notoriety, he was invited to film his Epic 1 Shot at the New York Auto Show, and in 2025, he lectured at the Bild Expo sponsored by B&H Photo. The talk was called Behind the Lens: Secrets of Viral Video Success. Drex won the Nightography Award for Best Film by Samsung in 2025 for the Galaxy S25 series.

On Jul 15, 2024, he was invited to fire the ceremonial siren at a San Jose Earthquakes game. Drex also directed the remake music video for Shiny Disco Balls (Scotty Boy version).

== Biography ==
Drex Lee was born on November 7, 1984, and grew up in Stockton, California. From a young age, Drex was interested in filmmaking and later pursued a degree in the field in college. Drex began making videos for businesses. He also directed music videos and developed the Epic 1 Shot technique. By 2021, Drex became a full-time creator focusing on smartphone cinematography. He filmed fashion shoots, fast cars, and stunts.

He began posting videos for content creators, outlining his Epic 1 Shot shooting technique by recording his entire method, then showing viewers the final product. His video entitled How to film a Hellcat drive off has amassed over 300 million views on YouTube as of June 2025. At the beginning of each video, he shares his signature term Boom. By June of 2025, the content creator reached eight billion views across social media platforms TikTok, Instagram, Snapchat, Threads, and Facebook.

Due to his immense notoriety, Drex has filmed his Epic 1 Shot with celebrities including Kevin Hart, Serena Williams, Tracy Morgan, and Travis Kelce. He recently filmed a promo for the film Karate Kid: Legends featuring Jackie Chan and Ben Wang. The film Drex directed, entitled Find You was an official selection of the 2022 New York Mobile Film Festival.
