= Ocean Drive (Duke Dumont song) =

2015 single by Duke Dumont

Single by Duke Dumont

from the EP Blasé Boys Club Part 1 and the album Duality
- Released: 31 July 2015
- Recorded: 2015
- Genre: Indie dance; nu-disco
- Length: 3:25 (single version); 4:42 (extended mix)
- Label: Blasé Boys Club; Virgin EMI
- Songwriters: Timucin Lam; Adam Dyment; James Norton; Hal Ritson
- Producer: Duke Dumont

Duke Dumont singles chronology
"The Giver (Reprise)" (2015)	"Ocean Drive" (2015)	"Be Here" (2016)

Music video
- "Ocean Drive" on YouTube

"Ocean Drive" is a song by British DJ and record producer Duke Dumont, and features uncredited vocals by Boy Matthews. It was released as the lead single from his seventh extended play, Blasé Boys Club Part 1, on 31 July 2015. A music video for the song was also released on 15 September through Vevo and YouTube. It reached number one in Hungary and Poland, and became the number one song on the 2016 year-end chart in Poland.

"Ocean Drive" charted at thirteenth place on the Triple J Hottest 100, 2015, becoming one of Dumont's most well-known hit singles to date.

== Music video ==
The official music video for "Ocean Drive", which was recorded in the Melrose District of Los Angeles, was uploaded onto Vevo and YouTube on 15 September 2015. It was directed by Ben Wolin and GoodBoyShady and features a group of women partying around the city while the lyrics to the song appear on screen.

== Track listing ==
Digital download – single
No.	Title	Length
1.	"Ocean Drive"	3:25

Digital download – remixes
No.	Title	Length
1.	"Ocean Drive" (Michael Calfan Remix)	4:41
2.	"Ocean Drive" (Hayden James Remix)	4:36
3.	"Ocean Drive" (Alison Wonderland Remix)	3:45
4.	"Ocean Drive" (Zinc Remix)	4:54
5.	"Ocean Drive" (Shaun Frank Remix)	5:07

== Charts ==
=== Weekly charts ===
Chart (2015–2017)	Peak position
Australia (ARIA)	5
Australia Club (ARIA)	1
Australia Dance (ARIA)	1
Belgium (Ultratip Bubbling Under Flanders)	6
Belgium (Ultratip Bubbling Under Wallonia)	17
Bulgaria (National Top 40)	1
CIS Airplay (TopHit)	4
Czech Republic Airplay (ČNS IFPI)	3
Czech Republic Singles Digital (ČNS IFPI)	33
France (SNEP)	68
Greece Digital Songs (Billboard)	1
Hungary (Dance Top 40)	1
Hungary (Rádiós Top 40)	3
Hungary (Single Top 40)	1
Hungary (Stream Top 40)	21
Ireland (IRMA)	56
Lebanon (Lebanese Top 20)	6
Netherlands (Single Top 100)	61
New Zealand (Recorded Music NZ)	14
Poland Airplay (ZPAV)	1
Poland Dance (ZPAV)	5
Portugal (AFP)	11
Portugal Digital Songs (Billboard)	2
Romania (Media Forest)	2
Russia Airplay (TopHit)	5
Scottish Singles Sales (Official Charts)	27
Serbia Airplay (Radiomonitor)	3
Slovakia Airplay (ČNS IFPI)	3
Slovakia Singles Digital (ČNS IFPI)	21
Ukraine Airplay (TopHit)	4
UK Singles (Official Charts)	42
UK Dance (Official Charts)	13
US Dance Club Songs (Billboard)	1
US Hot Dance/Electronic Songs (Billboard)	14
US Pop Airplay (Billboard)	40

2023–2026 weekly chart performance for "Ocean Drive"
Chart (2023–2026)	Peak position
Belarus Airplay (TopHit)	80
CIS Airplay (TopHit)	135
Greece International (IFPI)	73
Moldova Airplay (TopHit)	43
Romania Airplay (TopHit)	154

=== Monthly charts ===
Monthly chart performance
Chart (2026)	Peak position
Belarus Airplay (TopHit)	92

=== Year-end charts ===
Chart (2015)	Position
Australia (ARIA)	59
US Hot Dance/Electronic Songs (Billboard)	72
Chart (2016)	Position
Australia (ARIA)	76
Brazil (Brasil Hot 100)	98
CIS (Tophit)	8
Hungary (Dance Top 40)	1
Hungary (Rádiós Top 40)	6
Hungary (Single Top 40)	4
New Zealand (Recorded Music NZ)	44
Poland (ZPAV)	1
Russia Airplay (Tophit)	12
Ukraine Airplay (Tophit)	10
US Hot Dance/Electronic Songs (Billboard)	68
Chart (2017)	Position
Poland (ZPAV)	94
Hungary (Dance Top 40)	21
Hungary (Rádiós Top 40)	8
Hungary (Single Top 40)	64
Chart (2018)	Position
Hungary (Rádiós Top 40)	35
Chart (2022)	Position
Ukraine Airplay (TopHit)	181
Chart (2024)	Position
Belarus Airplay (TopHit)	179

2025 year-end chart performance for "Ocean Drive"
Chart (2025)	Position
Belarus Airplay (TopHit)	187
CIS Airplay (TopHit)	185
Poland (Polish Airplay Top 100)	93

== Certifications ==
Region	Certification	Certified units/sales
Australia (ARIA)	4× Platinum	280,000^{‡}
Brazil (Pro-Música Brasil)	Diamond	250,000^{‡}
Canada (Music Canada)	2× Platinum	160,000^{‡}
Denmark (IFPI Danmark)	Gold	45,000^{‡}
Germany (BVMI)	Gold	200,000^{‡}
Italy (FIMI)	Gold	25,000^{‡}
Netherlands (NVPI)	Platinum	40,000^{‡}
New Zealand (RMNZ)	5× Platinum	150,000^{‡}
Poland (ZPAV)	Diamond	100,000^{‡}
Portugal (AFP)	Gold	5,000^{‡}
Spain (Promusicae)	Gold	30,000^{‡}
United Kingdom (BPI)	2× Platinum	1,200,000^{‡}
United States (RIAA)	Platinum	1,000,000^{‡}
Streaming
Greece (IFPI Greece)	3× Platinum	6,000,000^{†}
^{‡} Sales+streaming figures based on certification alone.^{†} Streaming-only figures based on certification alone.

== Release history ==
Region	Date	Format	Label	Ref
Various	31 July 2015	Digital download – single	Virgin EMI	
Various	25 September 2015	Digital download – remixes	Blasé Boys Club	
