= I Got U =

2014 single by Duke Dumont ft. Jax Jones

Single by Duke Dumont featuring Jax Jones

from the album EP1
- Released: 13 January 2014
- Recorded: June 2012
- Genre: Deep house
- Length: 4:45
- Label: Blasé Boys Club; Virgin EMI
- Songwriters: Timucin Aluo; Jerry Duplessis; Adam Dyment; Wyclef Jean
- Producers: Duke Dumont; Jax Jones

Duke Dumont singles chronology
"Need U (100%)" (2013)	"I Got U" (2014)	"Won't Look Back" (2014)

Jax Jones singles chronology
"Go Deep" (2013)	"I Got U" (2014)	"Yeah Yeah Yeah" (2015)

Music video
- "I Got U" on YouTube

"I Got U" is a song by English DJ and record producer Duke Dumont featuring English DJ, record producer and remixer Jax Jones and British singer-songwriter Kelli-Leigh from their 2014 debut album EP1.

== Background and release ==
The song interpolates the 1998 song "My Love Is Your Love" by American singer Whitney Houston. Dumont stated that "I Got U" was inspired by the song, saying: "It's one of my favourite Whitney songs, especially the latter Whitney period."

In April 2014, Dumont explained his process of making the song:

I tend to make summery songs in the winter and winter songs in the summer, I'm like that typical British person that in the winter that moans that it's too cold and in the summer I moan that it's too hot, so the studio is my escapism. There was no master plan like 'hey I'm a gonna make a summer song and then build a buzz around it in January' – there wasn't much thought process to it!

It was released in the United Kingdom on 16 March 2014 on Blasé Boys Club and Virgin EMI Records. A remix EP was released on the same day containing remixes of the song by MK, Tensnake, Jonas Rathsman, Bondax and High Contrast.

== Promotion ==
The song was first aired on Annie Mac's Radio 1 show on 6 December 2013. She replayed the record halfway through because she could not get enough of it.

== Critical reception ==
The song received widespread critical acclaim. Robert Copsey praised the track for containing "all the summertime essentials: steel drums, Balearic synths and a myriad of earworm hooks" and noted that its choice of sample was "brave" but "sensitive enough that the essence of the original isn't lost". He also commended the vocal delivery of Kelli Leigh, describing it as "at times ... hauntingly similar to Whitney's". Lacy Kelly said that the song created a "calming vibe with a low steady beat, weaving piano between steel drums and Kelli Leigh's beautiful voice". In addition, Beatsmedia.com's William Michael called it "perfect for those laid back Balearic moments. Containing a cool laid back vibe, sweet piano chords and calypso rhythms "I Got U" has summer vibes written all over it and it when that unmistakable Whitney vocal comes in that you know this is one special record indeed". Jamieson Cox of Pitchfork called the song, "a blast of sunlight and warm, humid air, flecks of steel drum, vocal samples, and a joyous, radiant vocal take."

== Chart performance ==
It reached number 14 on Flanders' Ultratop chart and number 47 on the Netherlands' Single Top 100. In the United Kingdom, the song topped the Official Singles Chart.

== Music video ==
A music video was created for the single and was directed by Rémy Cayuela. Starring the model and actor Rique and New Zealand model Kylee Tan from a first-person perspective, the video was released on 19 February 2014, and was filmed in Thailand in locations Bangkok, Phi Phi Islands and Phuket. The video starts with a man buying a device. The man starts dreaming, wakes up at a villa in Kamala, Phuket with a group. Then they go to Phi Phi Islands, which includes beach with monkeys near 7°44'36"N 98°45'45"E. After several beach and boat clips, they go to Bangkok. They are travelling with car, starting at 13°44'23.6"N 100°33'22.4"E, then they walk at Soi Cowboy street. Then clips continue with skydiving in Kathu, Phuket and beach displays in the island. Later they ride a motorcycle at 7°47'50.8"N 98°18'09.7"E and 7°48'06.5"N 98°18'18"E exact coordinates in Phuket. The device shut down at a shooting range and video ends. Critical reception for it was positive; Capital Xtra noted that the video contained "all the experiences you'd expect someone to have whilst travelling to that part of the globe, including beach parties, boat rides and bonfires". GQ magazine commended it for containing, in their words, "all the tropical trimmings: turquoise waters, infinity pools, freshly sliced watermelon, a beachside rave, bungee jumps, inquisitive monkeys and an abundance of models in neon two-pieces" and noted that its only drawback is that it caused cravings for coconut drinks, an extended holiday and a game of beach volleyball.

== Track listings ==
Digital download – single
No.	Title	Length
1.	"I Got U"	4:45

CD single
No.	Title	Length
1.	"I Got U"	4:45
2.	"I Got U" (Tensnake remix)	5:48

Digital download – EP
No.	Title	Length
1.	"I Got U" (MK remix)	7:17
2.	"I Got U" (Tensnake remix)	5:48
3.	"I Got U" (Jonas Rathsman remix)	5:57
4.	"I Got U" (Bondax remix)	4:20
5.	"I Got U" (High Contrast remix)	4:53

== Personnel ==
Personnel are adapted from the "I Got U" CD single.

- Jerry Duplessis – songwriting
- Wyclef Jean – songwriting
- Adam Dyment – songwriting, production, programming
- Jax Jones (Timucin Aluo) – songwriting, production, instruments, programming
- Tommy Forrest – mixing
- Hal Ritson – sample recreation production, backing vocals
- Kelli-Leigh Henry-Davila – lead vocals
- Yolanda Quartey – backing vocals
- Richard Adlam – backing vocals
- Daniel Pearce – backing vocals

== Charts ==
=== Weekly charts ===
Weekly chart performance for "I Got U"
Chart (2014)	Peak position
Australia (ARIA)	17
Austria (Ö3 Austria Top 40)	19
Belgium (Ultratop 50 Flanders)	14
Belgium (Ultratop 50 Wallonia)	32
Canada Hot 100 (Billboard)	85
Czech Republic Airplay (ČNS IFPI)	6
Czech Republic Singles Digital (ČNS IFPI)	17
Denmark (Tracklisten)	36
Euro Digital Song Sales (Billboard)	2
France (SNEP)	35
Germany (GfK)	22
Hungary (Rádiós Top 40)	2
Hungary (Single Top 40)	3
Ireland (IRMA)	1
Israel International Airplay (Media Forest)	3
Italy (FIMI)	10
Netherlands (Single Top 100)	47
New Zealand (Recorded Music NZ)	29
Poland Airplay (ZPAV)	5
Poland Dance (ZPAV)	17
Scottish Singles Sales (Official Charts)	2
Slovakia Airplay (ČNS IFPI)	17
Slovakia Singles Digital (ČNS IFPI)	14
Slovenia (SloTop50)	25
Switzerland (Schweizer Hitparade)	23
UK Singles (Official Charts)	1
UK Dance (Official Charts)	1
US Hot Dance/Electronic Songs (Billboard)	13
US Dance Club Songs (Billboard)	1

=== Year-end charts ===
Annual chart rankings for "I Got U"
Chart (2014)	Position
Belgium (Ultratop 50 Flanders)	64
Belgium (Ultratop 50 Wallonia)	86
France (SNEP)	111
Germany (Official German Charts)	78
Hungary (Rádiós Top 40)	19
Hungary (Single Top 40)	25
Italy (FIMI)	55
Netherlands (Single Top 100)	98
Poland (ZPAV)	13
UK Singles (OCC)	26
US Dance Club Songs (Billboard)	5
US Hot Dance/Electronic Songs (Billboard)	32

== Certifications ==
Region	Certification	Certified units/sales
Australia (ARIA)	Platinum	70,000^{‡}
Brazil (Pro-Música Brasil)	Platinum	60,000^{‡}
Germany (BVMI)	Platinum	300,000^{‡}
Italy (FIMI)	Platinum	30,000^{‡}
New Zealand (RMNZ)	2× Platinum	60,000^{‡}
Sweden (GLF)	Platinum	40,000^{‡}
United Kingdom (BPI)	2× Platinum	1,200,000^{‡}
United States (RIAA)	Gold	500,000^{‡}
Streaming
Denmark (IFPI Danmark)	Gold	1,300,000^{†}
^{‡} Sales+streaming figures based on certification alone.^{†} Streaming-only figures based on certification alone.

== Release history ==
Region	Date	Format	Label
Belgium	13 January 2014	Digital download	Virgin EMI
United Kingdom	16 March 2014	Digital download	Virgin EMI

== See also ==
- List of number-one dance singles of 2014 (US)
