= Every Day Is a Holiday =

Promotional single by Katy Perry
- Released: November 23, 2015
- Genre: Christmas; dance
- Length: 2:00
- Songwriter: Katy Perry
- Producer: Duke Dumont

"Every Day Is a Holiday" is a song written and recorded by American singer Katy Perry. Duke Dumont produced the song, which was released as a promotional single on November 23, 2015 as part of H&M's holiday campaign, along with a promotional commercial directed by Jonas Åkerlund but remains unreleased on main streaming services. It is a gospel-inspired Christmas dance track about how love is the best Christmas gift.

== Composition ==
"Every Day Is a Holiday" was written by Perry and produced by Duke Dumont. Lyrically, the song talks about how the best Christmas gift one can receive is love. It features a background choir as Perry sings the chorus:

We don't need a thing under the tree
You give me all I need
Every day is a holiday
When you're the reason to celebrate
Every day is a holiday
When you're the reason

The track contains a "'70s disco essence and a big ol' thumping bassline". It is a gospel-inspired dance track, and Perry's first Christmas song.

== Release and promotion ==
The song was released on November 23, 2015. The same day, it was featured in a two-minute commercial for H&M's 2015 holiday campaign. It features Perry interacting with gingerbread men, presents, and large teddy bears while sporting various holiday-themed clothes made by the store. The commercial was directed by Jonas Åkerlund and filmed in July 2015. Perry herself described it as "very jolly", and was happy to wear H&M's clothes in the video since "H&M has been a part of the evolution of my personal style since I was 13, when I would start to incorporate fun, affordable H&M pieces into my vintage wardrobe".

== Reception ==
Lara O'Reilly of Business Insider criticized the video as "bizarre" while Idolator's Bianca Gracie described it as "slightly cheesy but fun". Writing for Fuse, Jeff Bejamin praised the song as "catchy" and ranked it number one on a "Best Holiday Songs of 2015" list. VH1 also gave a positive review, calling the commercial "fun" and "energetic" and felt Perry's outfits were "cute". Lauren Valenti from Marie Claire dubbed the song "a track filled with good tidings". In a negative review, Matt Miller from Esquire felt the video was "a hellish non-denominational land of cheer". Glamour writer Christopher Rosa ranked it as Perry's 7th worst song, adding that the H&M campaign it was made for is "exactly where it should stay".
