= Need U (100%) =

Single by Duke Dumont featuring A*M*E
- Released: 31 March 2013
- Genre: Deep house
- Length: 2:54 (radio edit); 3:53 (album version)
- Label: Blasé Boys Club; Ministry of Sound; Spinnin'
- Songwriters: Adam Dyment; Amy Kabba; Uzoechi Emenike
- Producers: Duke Dumont; Tommy Forrest

Duke Dumont singles chronology
"The Giver" (2012)	"Need U (100%)" (2013)	"I Got U" (2014)

A*M*E singles chronology
"Play the Game Boy" (2012)	"Need U (100%)" (2013)	"Heartless" (2013)

Music video
- "Need U (100%)" on YouTube

"Need U (100%)" is a song by British musician and DJ Duke Dumont. It features the vocals from British singer A*M*E. It was released as a digital download in the United Kingdom on 31 March 2013, and entered at number one on the UK Singles Chart. The song has also charted in the Netherlands, Belgium and Ireland and reached the number one position on the Billboard Hot Dance Club Songs chart in the United States. The song was written by Duke Dumont, A*M*E, and MNEK, and it was produced by Dumont with additional production by Tommy Forrest. The song was nominated for the 2014 Grammy Award for Best Dance Recording.

The Guardian named "Need U (100%)" the thirteenth best song of 2013, and Pitchfork Media ranked the song number 94 on its year-end list.

== Critical reception ==
Carrie Battan of Pitchfork said that the song, "sounds as though it could fold over onto itself for an eternity." She also states that vocalist A*M*E does well in adding her vocals to the "janky house beat" of the song.

== Music video ==
A music video to accompany the release of "Need U (100%)" was first released onto YouTube on 22 February 2013 at a total length of three minutes and eleven seconds. The video, shot in Los Angeles and starring Rique, features a guy who has his tape recorder stuck inside his body and is frustrated that whenever the song plays everyone around him starts dancing. He decides it's time to remove the device through surgery and after it is removed he looks at the recorder and stops the song from playing, leaving the people around him disappointed. The music video was directed by Ian Robertson.

== Track listings ==
Digital download
No.	Title	Length
1.	"Need U (100%)" (radio edit)	2:54
2.	"Need U (100%)"	3:53
3.	"Need U (100%)" (Waze & Odyssey remix)	6:28
4.	"Need U (100%)" (Skreamix)	6:32

== Charts and certifications ==
=== Weekly charts ===
Chart (2013)	Peak position
Australia (ARIA)	40
Belgium (Ultratop 50 Flanders)	17
Belgium (Ultratip Bubbling Under Wallonia)	9
CIS Airplay (TopHit)	22
Czech Republic Airplay (ČNS IFPI)	19
Denmark (Tracklisten)	31
Euro Digital Song Sales (Billboard)	2
Germany (GfK)	43
Hungary (Dance Top 40)	7
Hungary (Rádiós Top 40)	4
Ireland (IRMA)	27
Netherlands (Dutch Top 40)	18
Netherlands (Single Top 100)	20
Poland Dance (ZPAV)	27
Russia Airplay (TopHit)	20
Scotland Singles (Official Charts)	1
Slovakia Airplay (ČNS IFPI)	40
UK Singles (Official Charts)	1
UK Dance (Official Charts)	1
UK Indie (Official Charts)	1
US Dance Club Songs (Billboard)	1
US Hot Dance/Electronic Songs (Billboard)	24

=== Year-end charts ===
Chart (2013)	Position
Belgium (Ultratop Flanders)	85
Hungary (Dance Top 40)	15
Hungary (Rádiós Top 40)	7
Netherlands (Dutch Top 40)	81
Russia Airplay (TopHit)	73
UK Singles (OCC)	35
US Dance Club Songs (Billboard)	44
US Hot Dance/Electronic Songs (Billboard)	80

Chart (2014)	Position
Hungary (Dance Top 40)	60

=== Certifications ===
Region	Certification	Certified units/sales
Australia (ARIA)	Platinum	70,000^{‡}
United Kingdom (BPI)	Platinum	600,000^{‡}
^{‡} Sales+streaming figures based on certification alone.

== Release history ==
Region	Date	Format	Label
Belgium	14 January 2013	Digital download	Blasé Boys Club
United Kingdom	31 March 2013	Digital download	Ministry of Sound

== See also ==
- List of number-one dance singles of 2013 (U.S.)
