= The Giver (Reprise) =

Single by Duke Dumont
- Released: 14 June 2015
- Recorded: 2012
- Genre: Deep house
- Length: 3:23
- Label: Turbo
- Songwriter(s): Adam Dyment; Byron Stingily; Hal Ritson; Byron Burke; Kelli-Leigh Henry-Davila
- Producer(s): Duke Dumont

Duke Dumont singles chronology
"Won't Look Back" (2014)	"The Giver (Reprise)" (2015)	"Ocean Drive" (2015)

Music video
- "The Giver (Reprise)" on YouTube

"The Giver (Reprise)" is a vocal remix of the 2012 song "The Giver" by British DJ and record producer Duke Dumont. It was released as a digital download in the United Kingdom on 14 June 2015. The song was written by Adam Dyment, Byron Stingily, Hal Ritson, Byron Burke, Kelli-Leigh Henry-Davila and produced by Duke Dumont. The song peaked at number 32 on the UK Singles Chart. The original song was released in 2012. The song was remixed by Australian future bass producer Wave Racer.

== Music video ==
A music video to accompany the release of "The Giver (Reprise)" was first released onto YouTube on 21 May 2015 at a total length of three minutes and twenty-two seconds. The video was filmed on Venice Beach, California.

== Chart performance ==
=== Weekly charts ===
Chart (2015)	Peak position
Scotland (OCC)	21
UK Dance (OCC)	8
UK Singles (OCC)	32
US Hot Dance/Electronic Songs (Billboard)	40
US Dance Club Songs (Billboard)	1

=== Year-end charts ===
Chart (2015)	Position
US Dance Club Songs (Billboard)	27

== Certifications ==
Region	Certification	Certified units/sales
United Kingdom (BPI)	Gold	400,000^{‡}
^{‡} Sales+streaming figures based on certification alone.

== Release history ==
Region	Date	Format	Label
United Kingdom	14 June 2015	Digital download	Turbo
