= B&H Photo =

Photo and video equipment store in New York City

B&H Photo & Electronics Corp.

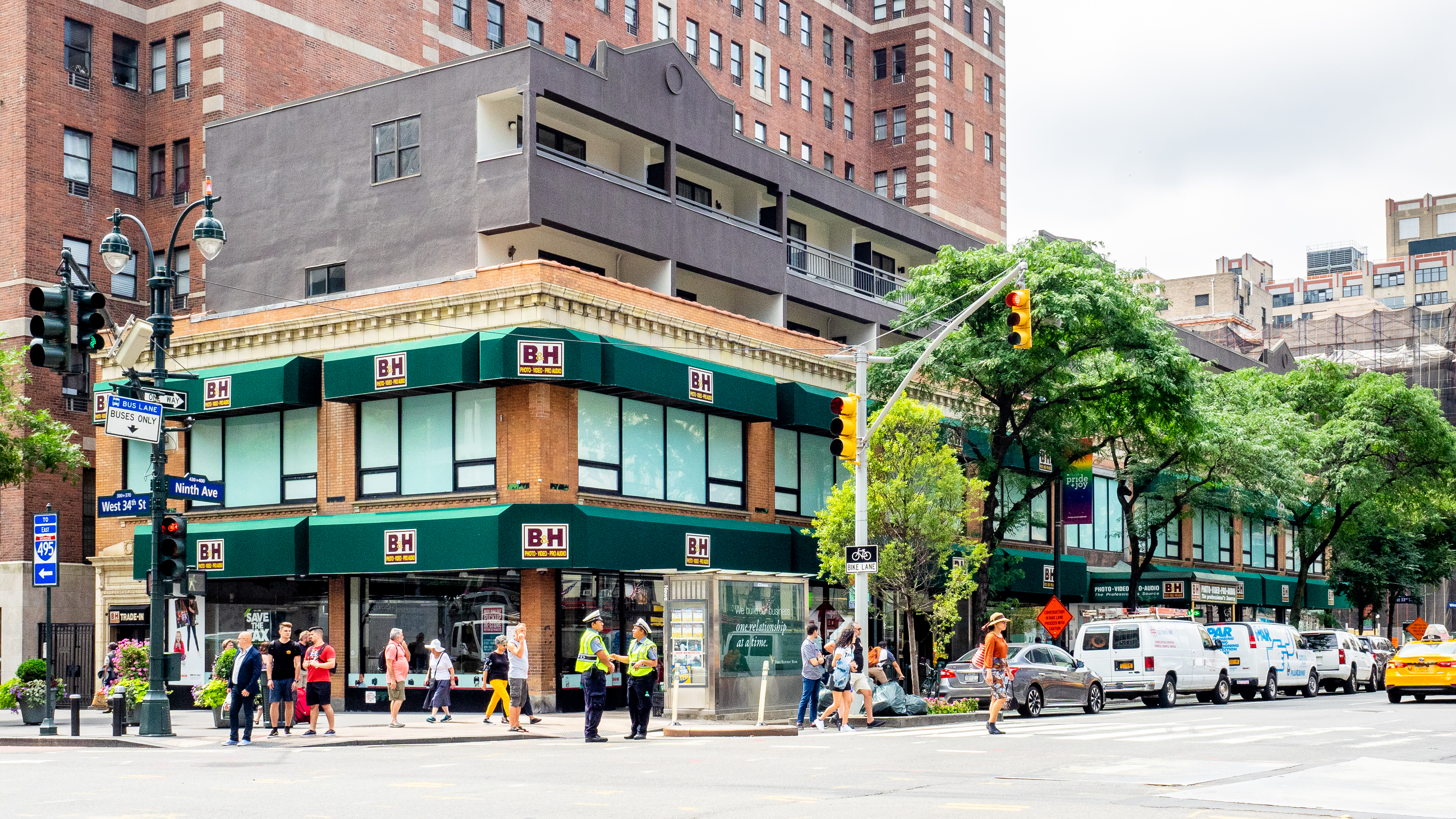
- The exterior of the store on West 34th Street
- Type: Private
- Industry: Retail
- Founded: 1973; 53 years ago Manhattan, New York City, U.S.
- Founders: Blimie Schreiber; Herman Schreiber
- Headquarters: Manhattan, New York City, U.S. 40°45′11″N 73°59′47″W
- Number of locations: 1
- Products: Cameras, video, film, audio, computers, electronics
- Website: www.bhphotovideo.com

B&H Photo Video (also known as B&H Foto & Electronics Corporation, B&H Photo, or simply B&H) is an American photo and video equipment retailer founded in 1973, based in Manhattan, New York City. B&H conducts business primarily through online e-commerce consumer sales and business to business sales, as they only have one retail location. While initially a photo and film shop, B&H has grown into one of the largest electronics retailers in the U.S., selling over 400,000 products.

== History ==
B&H opened in 1973 as a storefront film shop at 17 Warren Street in Tribeca, taking its name from the initials of owners Blimie and Herman Schreiber. Later in the 1970s, B&H moved to 119 West 17th Street between Sixth and Seventh Avenues in the Photo District and began to expand its stock to a wider range of film and photography products. In the 1990s, the company began selling various electronics, including computers, lighting, and audio equipment. In 1997, the store moved to its present location.

The owner of the company, Herman Schreiber, and many of the store's employees are observant Satmar Hasidic Jews. The company’s only brick-and-mortar store is located in Manhattan at 420 Ninth Avenue at the intersection with West 34th Street. The store is closed on Shabbat, most Jewish holidays, and Christmas. Although the B&H website is accessible on Shabbat, checkout and processing of online orders are unavailable during that time (from sundown Friday evening till Saturday evening) along with Jewish holidays according to local (New York) time.

In 2007, B&H opened a second floor above its original sales floor making a total of 70,000 sq ft (6,500 m^{2}) of sales space. That same year, B&H moved its offices to 440 9th Avenue in Manhattan.

As the company has grown, it expanded its office presence to accommodate sales, customer service, buying, marketing, and various back office functions; these functions are housed in 150,000 square feet of office space. The store has an extensive conveyor belt system that runs along the ceiling.

In 2015, B&H added an Apple authorized shop to the computer department with an assortment of Apple products. There is an Apple employee in shop to assist and consult. In 2016, Vaio announced that they signed a contract with B&H photo video to offer their products.

In 2017, B&H moved their warehouses in Brooklyn to their fulfillment center of over 500,000 square feet (46,000 m^{2}) located in Florence, New Jersey.

== Bild Expo ==
Bild Expo
- Status: Active
- Genre: Multigenre
- Venue: Javits Center
- Locations: Manhattan, New York, U.S.
- Country: United States
- Inaugurated: September 6, 2023; 3 years ago
- Most recent: June 17, 2025; 17 months ago
- Attendance: 50,000 (2025)
- Organizer: B&H Photo
- Website: www.bildexpo.com

In 2023, B&H Photo Video celebrated its 50th anniversary with the inaugural Bild Expo (named after the Yiddish word for "image"), held on September 6–7 at the Javits Center in New York City.

The Expo was free to attend and featured four main stages:

1. the Bild Main Stage for talks from photographers, directors, and creators;
2. the OPTIC stage for outdoor and travel photography;
3. the Depth of Field Stage for instruction on portrait, wedding, and event photography; and
4. the Creative Production stage or filmmaking, videography, and editing.

In addition to educational experiences, the expo included a 100,000+ square-foot Gear Expo with more than 130 creative technology brands. The event also celebrated the 100th anniversary of 16mm filmmaking with a special Kodak 16mm Film Workshop.

Also in 2023, as part of the company’s 50th anniversary celebration, B&H sold custom LEGO models of their flagship store.

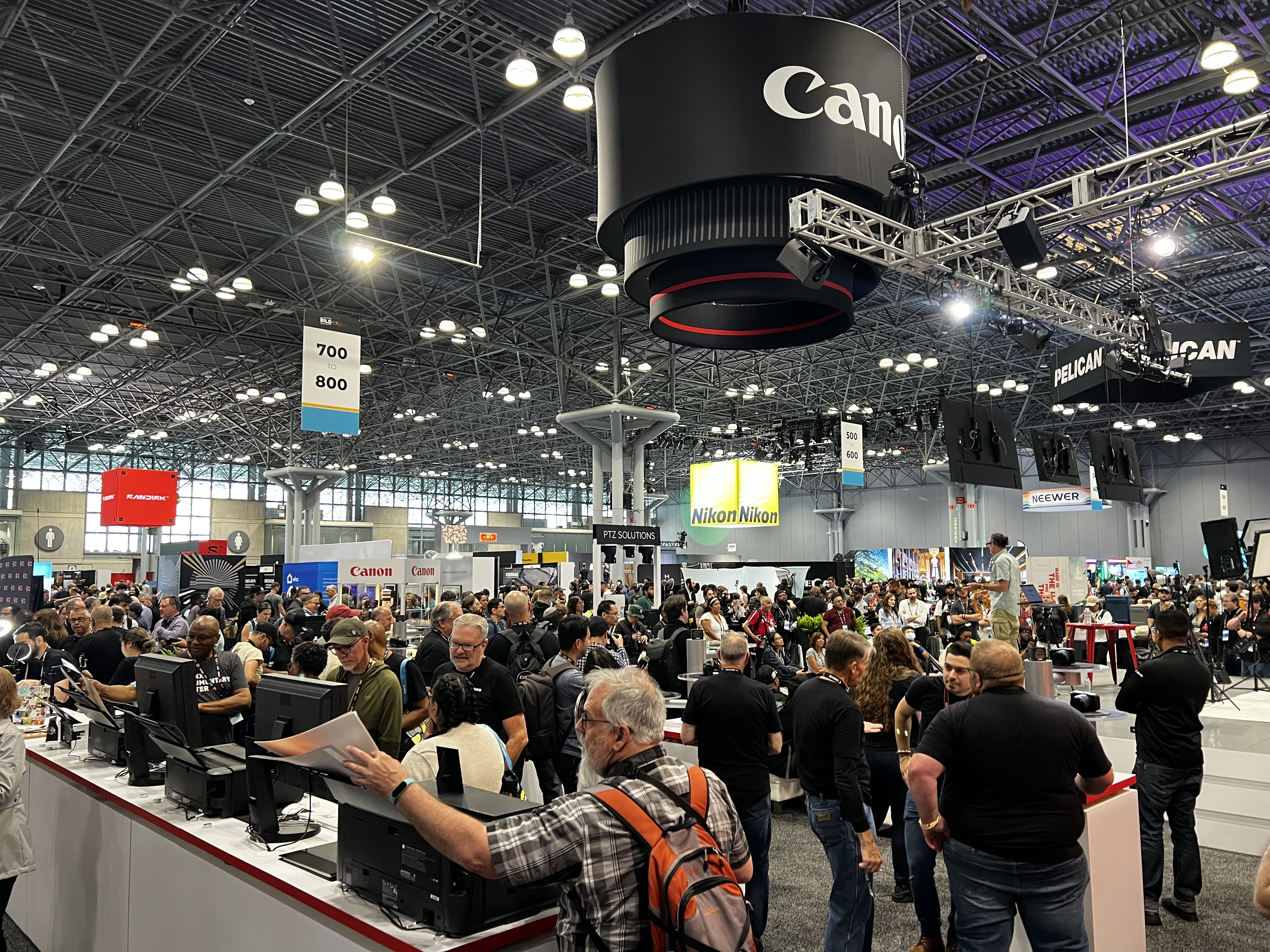
2025 Bild Expo

In 2025, B&H Photo Video hosted its second Bild Expo on June 17–18, again at the Javits Center in New York City and again was free to attend. The 2025 Bild Expo featured six stages, over 100 speakers, over 250 exhibitors, and hands-on workshops. There were reports of up to 50,000 attendees over the two days. Some of the talks featured Pulitzer Prize-winning photojournalist Lynsey Addario, conservation photographer Cristina Mittermeier, author Scott Kelby, filmmaker Drex Lee, cinematographer Sarina Soriano, cinematographer Ed Lachman, headshot photographer Peter Hurley, and photojournalist Chris Burkard. There was also a Women in Media panel with actress and content creator Shuang Hu, Outshine Talent CEO Barbara Jones, Verizon Head of Creators Lina Renzina, and The Luupe CEO Keren Sachs. Major brands included Sony, Nikon, Apple, Leica, Adobe, GoPro, Fujifilm and Canon.

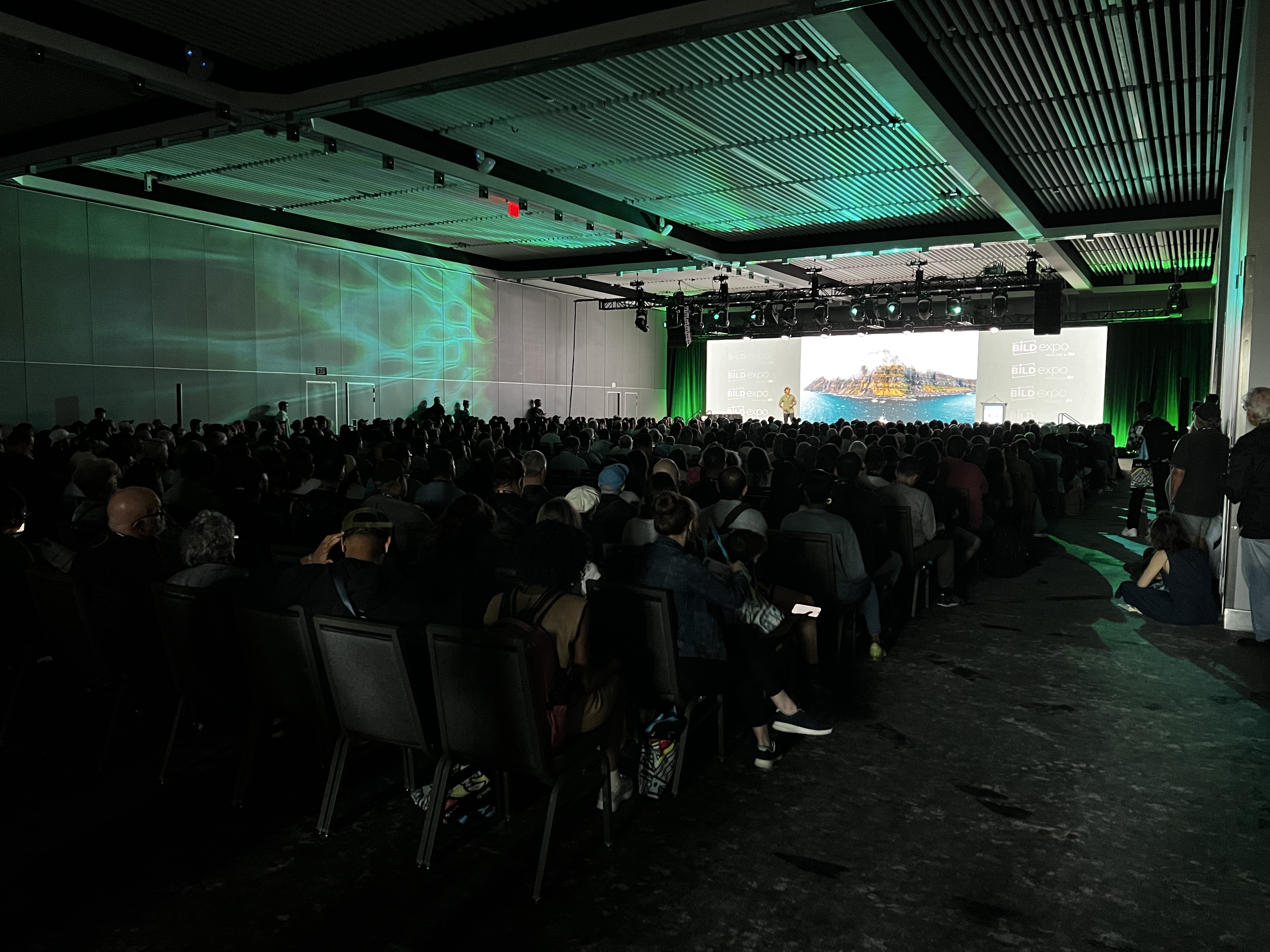
Talk at 2025 Bild Expo

Unlike typical merchant-based trade shows, Bild Expo does not intend to make any profit from the event itself. The Chief Marketing Officer of B&H Photo Video, Jeff Gerstel, is quoted saying:

The whole idea was to bring the B&H brand to life for a two-day celebration of what we do. Rule number one was it had to be free [for attendees]. We weren’t there to sell anything; we weren’t there to make money. We wanted to create an event for the benefit of the attendees, with one simple goal — that they leave having learned something, been inspired by something or someone and gotten access to the brands they love and the creators they follow in a very humble, low-key and intimate setting.

The apparent success and demand of attendees at Bild Expo is speculated to also be a result of the decline of similar recent camera and film expos in New York City, which gave Bild Expo the opportunity to satisfy audience demand. Moreover, the conference also dedicated one-third of its conference sessions to content creation to bring in a typically younger audience to complement B&H's core photography audience.

== Payboo credit card ==
In 2019, B&H Photo launched the B&H Payboo store credit card through Synchrony Financial only for use at B&H including their website and store. When using the card, B&H collects and remits the appropriate sales tax but instantly rebates the same amount to the customer. In 2022, the card was relaunched through Comenity Capital Bank and gave customers the choice of a sales tax benefit or financing of up to 12 months on qualifying purchases.

== Philanthropy ==
In 2013, the B&H Wilderness Photo Competition awarded two prizes, one based on a professionally judged vote and one from a popular choice vote. The competition included categories such as land mammals, aquatic, birds, and landscape/scenery.

In 2018, B&H sponsored Bushwick Stories, a documentary workshop for young storytellers created by the Bushwick Film Festival. For many years, B&H has sponsored NYC Salt, a program that offers intensive photography training to NYC high school students. B&H also sponsors programs and fellowships at BRIC, the largest presenter of free cultural programming in Brooklyn. B&H has worked with partners, including Intel, to donate tech equipment to NYC public school classrooms.

During the COVID-19 pandemic, B&H organized "Days of Appreciation" for health care workers at Lenox Hill Hospital and other NYC hospitals.

== Controversies ==
In October 2007, it was reported that B&H Photo agreed to a US$4.3 million settlement in response to claims of discrimination against Hispanic workers. In November 2009, B&H Photo faced a lawsuit, initiated by four women, for allegedly violating New York City and New York State human rights laws with their hiring practices. The lawsuit, which aimed for class action status, sought $19 million in compensatory and punitive damages to discourage similar future practices.

In 2011, B&H was involved in a lawsuit concerning claims of discrimination against Hispanic workers. In August 2017, B&H Photo agreed to pay $3.22 million as both monetary relief and back wages to more than 1,300 individuals in a consent decree settlement that did not result from any finding or admission of guilt to resolve a lawsuit filed by the United States Department of Labor Office of Federal Contract Compliance Programs in February 2016 that alleged B&H discriminated against and harassed Hispanic workers.

In September 2021, the New York Supreme Court dismissed a lawsuit filed by the Attorney General of New York State claiming the company knowingly avoided paying millions in New York sales taxes, finding that B&H had not acted improperly.

== Awards & recognition ==
In 2015, B&H's Google Play app was named the "Best Mobile Shopping App" at the Mobile Shop Conference.

In 2016, Consumer Reports awarded B&H Photo its No. 1 Top Rating for Best Electronics Retailer, and in 2018, named it the leading online consumer electronics retailer.

In May 2018, B&H was named by Forbes Magazine as one of America's Best Midsize Employers for 2018. The Forbes recognition was based on independent employee surveys conducted by Forbes. In 2020, the company was included on Forbes' “America’s Best Employers By State” list.

In 2018, B&H's consumer website was recognized as the Best for User Experience of any e-commerce company by the Baymard Institute. They were also ranked #1 in the Institute's mobile usability benchmark of the 50 highest grossing U.S. e-commerce sites.

Newsweek named B&H as one of America's Top Companies for Customer Service in 2019, 2020, and 2024, and has named B&H as a Best Online Shop from 2020 - 2023.

B&H Photo has won two Webby Awards in the How-to, Explainer & DIY video category; for The Art of Street Photography with Hugh Brownstone in 2023, and Ira Block's The Colours of Cuba in 2024.

In 2025, B&H Photo was listed in Newsweek's America's Most Loved Brands 2025 and America's Best of the Best 2025.

B&H was listed in USA TODAY's Most Trusted Brands in 2025 and 2026.
