= Lie to Me (disambiguation) =

Lie to Me is a 2009–2011 American crime drama television series.

Lie to Me may also refer to:

== Film and television ==
- Lie to Me (2011 TV series), a South Korean drama series
- "Lie to Me" (Buffy the Vampire Slayer), a 1997 television episode
- Lie to Me (film) or Fling, a 2008 film directed by John Stewart Muller

== Music ==
=== Albums ===
- Lie to Me (album) or the title song, by Jonny Lang, 1997

=== Songs ===
- "Lie to Me" (5 Seconds of Summer song), 2018
- "Lie to Me" (Bon Jovi song), 1995
- "Lie to Me" (Bret Michaels song), 2010
- "Lie to Me" (Cole Plante song), 2013
- "Lie to Me" (Gary Barlow song), 1999
- "Lie to Me" (Hrvy song), 2026
- "Lie to Me" (Mikolas Josef song), represented the Czech Republic in the Eurovision Song Contest 2018
- "Lie to Me" (Tate McRae and Ali Gatie song), 2020
- "Lie to Me" (Vera Blue song), 2020
- "Lie to Me (Denial)", by Red, 2011
- "Lie to Me", by 12 Stones from Anthem for the Underdog, 2007
- "Lie to Me", by Alessia Cara from In the Meantime, 2021
- "Lie to Me", by Brook Benton, 1962
- "Lie to Me", by Bryan Adams from On a Day Like Today, 1998
- "Lie to Me", by Cher from Closer to the Truth, 2013
- "Lie to Me", by Chris Isaak from Chris Isaak, 1987
- "Lie to Me", by Daniel Powter from Daniel Powter, 2005
- "Lie to Me", by David Byrne from Rei Momo, 1989
- "Lie to Me", by Depeche Mode from Some Great Reward, 1984
- "Lie to Me", by George Nozuka, 2007
- "Lie to Me", by McLean, 2013
- "Lie to Me", by Meghan Trainor from the album Treat Myself, 2020
- "Lie to Me", by Ne-Yo from Year of the Gentleman, 2008
- "Lie to Me", by Queen Naija from Missunderstood, 2020
- "Lie to Me", by Rob Thomas from The Great Unknown, 2015
- "Lie to Me", by Sara Bareilles from Once Upon Another Time, 2012
- "Lie to Me", by Sia from Music – Songs from and Inspired by the Motion Picture, 2021
- "Lie to Me", by Silverchair from Freak Show, 1997
- "Lie to Me", by Slam, featuring Ann Saunderson, 2004
- "Lie to Me", by Steve Aoki from Neon Future III, 2018
- "Lie to Me", by Tired Lion, 2020
- "Lie to Me", by Tom Waits from Orphans: Brawlers, Bawlers & Bastards, 2006
- "Lie to Me", by the Wanted from Battleground, 2011
