= Duke Dumont =

British DJ and producer (born 1982)

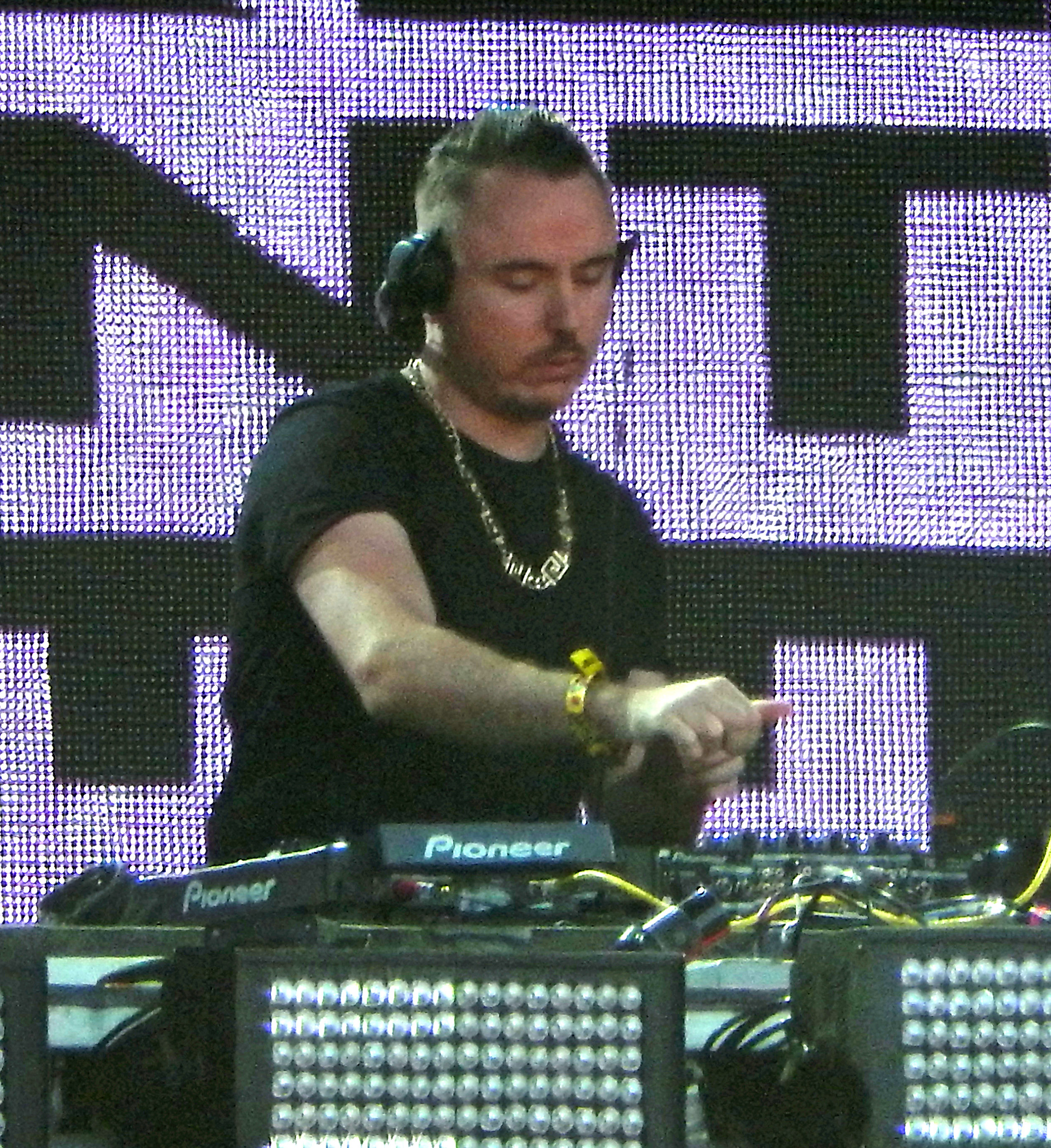
- Duke Dumont at Lollapalooza 2014

Background information
- Born: Adam George Dyment; 1982 (age 44)
- Genres: House; deep house; tech house; electronic
- Occupations: DJ, music producer
- Instrument: Keyboards
- Years active: 2007–present
- Labels: Blasé Boys Club; Virgin EMI; Defected
- Website: dukedumont.com

Adam George Dyment (born 1982), better known by his stage name Duke Dumont, is an English DJ and music producer. He is best known for his hit singles "Need U (100%)", "I Got U", "Won't Look Back" and "Ocean Drive", which reached number one, number one, number two and number forty-two on the UK singles chart, respectively. He founded the record label Blasé Boys Club and has also used it as an alias for production. He has remixed a number of songs, including several that have charted in the United Kingdom. In 2014, "Need U (100%)" was nominated for "Best Dance Recording" for the 56th Annual Grammy Awards. The following year, "I Got U" was nominated in the same category.

== Career ==
=== 2007–2011: Career beginnings ===
Duke's early career was mentored by Switch (who has produced for Beyoncé, M.I.A. and Santigold) and he made his name remixing pop songs, including Lily Allen's "The Fear", Mystery Jets' "Two Doors Down" and Bat for Lashes' "Daniel".

In March 2007, he released his first EP, the Regality EP for Turbo Recordings which was followed in August 2008 by The Dominion Dubs EP on Dubsided. Duke mixed the 2010 FabricLive.51 compilation album for Fabric.

In 2011, he moved out of London to the Hertfordshire countryside to focus on original material.

=== 2012–2019: Breakthrough ===
In 2012, Duke released two EPs on Tiga's Turbo Recordings, For Club Play Only Vol. 1 and Vol. 2, which were played on radio by Annie Mac and Fearne Cotton on BBC Radio 1 and Trevor Nelson on BBC Radio 1Xtra. In the same year, he remixed AlunaGeorge's "Your Drums, Your Love" and Santigold's "The Keepers".

On 31 March 2013, Dumont released the single, "Need U (100%)". The song features vocals from Sierra Leonean-born British singer A*M*E. The song has topped the UK singles chart and also charted in Belgium and the Netherlands. The official music video, directed by Ian Robertson and starring Rique, has more than 37 million YouTube views.

On 1 July 2013, Pitchfork premiered Duke Dumont's new album track, "Hold On", featuring vocals from British singer-songwriter MNEK.

On 6 December 2013, Annie Mac premiered Dumont's official single "I Got U". The single was released as the second single from his forthcoming debut studio album in 2014. The single, "I Got U", reached number one on the UK singles chart. The song interpolates the 1998 song "My Love Is Your Love" by American singer Whitney Houston. Dumont was inspired by the song, saying: "It's one of my favourite Whitney songs, especially the later Whitney period. It got to a point [during the recording process] where I thought maybe it might be worth bringing a singer in and changing it but I thought you know what, out of respect as [the track] started off working the song around "My Love Is Your Love", I kept it in."

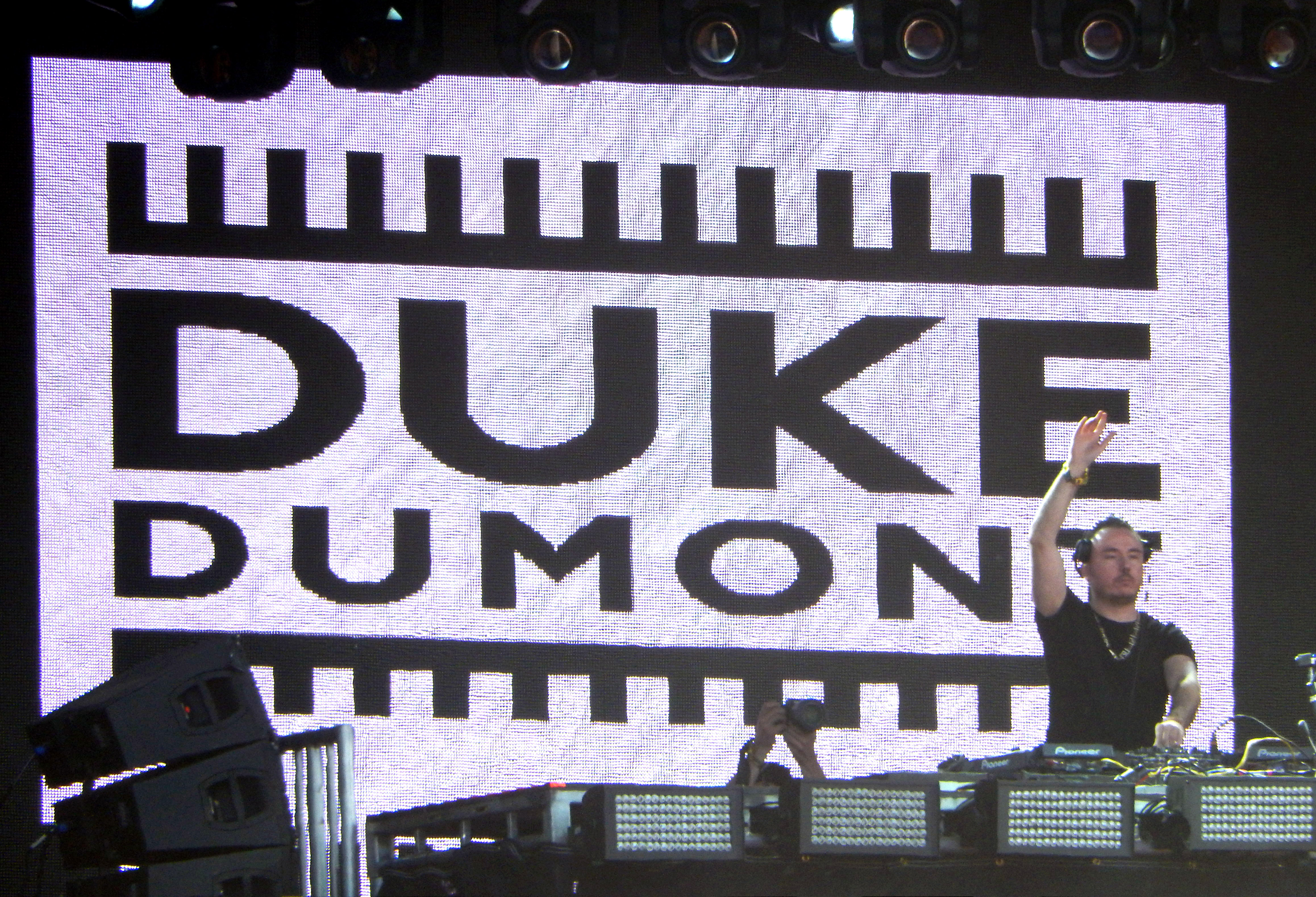
Duke Dumont at Lollapalooza 2014

In August 2014, Duke Dumont released "Won't Look Back", which reached number two on the UK singles chart.

In February 2015, "I Got U" was nominated for "Best Dance Recording" at the 57th Annual Grammy Awards.

At the end of July 2015, he released "Ocean Drive", from the EP Blasé Boys Club Pt. 1.

On 15 July 2015, during an interview with Annie Mac on BBC Radio 1, Duke Dumont said that he would be releasing two new singles, "Be Here" and "Worship" from the EP For Club Play Only Pt. 4. It was released by Defected Records on 1 August 2016.

=== 2020: Debut album ===
Dumont's debut album, Duality, was released on 17 April 2020. In an interview with Billboard, Dumont said he waited so long into his career to release his first album because "it gave me an opportunity to make an album and a body of music that has an emotional impact." He continued, "There's a reason there's strings on a lot of the tracks. That's to give it a sense of longevity. There's a reason why the songs have chords and not just beats and synth lines. You've got to aspire to that long game."

== Discography ==
=== Studio albums ===
| Title | Details | Peak chart positions | |
| Title | Details | UK | SCO |
|---|---|---|---|
| Duality | Released: 17 April 2020; Label: Virgin EMI; Formats: CD, digital download, LP, streaming | 99 | 77 |
| Union | Released: 25 July 2025; Label: Astralwerks/EMI; Formats: Digital download, streaming | — | — |
"—" denotes album did not chart in that territory.

=== Extended plays ===
| Title | EP details |
|---|---|
| Regality | Released: 18 July 2007; Label: Turbo; Formats: Digital download, streaming |
| The Dominion Dubs | Released: 1 August 2008; Label: Dubsided; Formats: Digital download, streaming |
| For Club Play Only Pt. 1 | Released: 21 May 2012; Label: Turbo; Formats: Digital download, streaming |
| For Club Play Only Pt. 2 | Released: 17 September 2012; Label: Turbo; Formats: Digital download, streaming |
| For Club Play Only Pt. 3 | Released: 28 July 2014; Label: Turbo; Formats: Digital download, streaming |
| EP1 | Released: 16 September 2014; Label: Virgin EMI; Formats: Digital download |
| Blasé Boys Club Pt. 1 | Released: 2 October 2015; Label: Virgin EMI; Formats: Digital download, streaming |
| For Club Play Only Pt. 4 | Released: 5 August 2016; Label: Virgin EMI; Formats: Digital download, streaming |
| For Club Play Only Pt. 7 | Released: 21 May 2021; Label: Virgin EMI; Formats: Digital download, streaming |

=== Singles ===
| Title | Year | Peak chart positions | | | | | | | | | | Certifications | Album |
| Title | Year | UK | AUS | DEN | FRA | GER | IRE | NL | NZ | SCO | US Dance Club | Certifications | Album |
|---|---|---|---|---|---|---|---|---|---|---|---|---|---|
| "Need U (100%)" (featuring A*M*E) | 2013 | 1 | 40 | 31 | — | 43 | 27 | 18 | — | 1 | 1 | BPI: Platinum; ARIA: Platinum | Non-album single |
| "I Got U" (featuring Jax Jones) | 2014 | 1 | 17 | 36 | 35 | 22 | 1 | 45 | 29 | 2 | 1 | BPI: 2× Platinum; ARIA: Platinum; BVMI: Platinum; IFPI DEN: Gold; RIAA: Gold | EP1 |
| "Won't Look Back" | 2014 | 2 | 37 | — | 180 | 41 | 36 | 41 | — | 3 | 1 | BPI: Platinum | EP1 |
| "The Giver (Reprise)" | 2015 | 32 | — | — | — | — | — | — | — | 21 | 1 | BPI: Gold | EP1 |
| "Ocean Drive" | 2015 | 42 | 5 | — | 68 | — | 56 | 32 | 14 | 27 | 1 | BPI: 2× Platinum; ARIA: 4× Platinum; BVMI: Gold; IFPI DEN: Gold; NVPI: Platinum; RIAA: Platinum; RMNZ: Platinum | Duality and Blasé Boys Club Pt. 1 |
| "Be Here" | 2016 | — | — | — | — | — | — | — | — | — | — | | For Club Play Only Pt. 4 |
| "Real Life" (with Gorgon City featuring Naations) | 2017 | 31 | — | — | — | — | 70 | — | — | 31 | — | BPI: Platinum | Escape |
| "Inhale" (featuring Ebenezer) | 2018 | — | — | — | — | — | — | — | — | — | — | | Non-album single |
| "Runway" | 2018 | — | — | — | — | — | — | — | — | — | 55 | | For Club Play Only Pt. 5 |
| "Red Light Green Light" (featuring Shaun Ross) | 2019 | — | 99 | — | — | — | — | — | — (Note: "Red Light Green Light" did not enter the NZ Top 40 Singles Chart, but peaked at number 27 on the NZ Hot Singles Chart.) | — | — | ARIA: Gold | For Club Play Only Pt. 6 |
| "The Power" (with Zak Abel) | 2019 | — | — | — | — | — | — | — | — (Note: "The Power" did not enter the NZ Top 40 Singles Chart, but peaked at number 37 on the NZ Hot Singles Chart.) | 74 | 1 | | Duality |
| "Therapy" | 2020 | — | — | — | — | — | — | — | — | 45 | 1 | | Duality |
| "Love Song" | 2020 | — | — | — | — | — | — | — | — | — | — | | Duality |
| "Let Me Go" (with Ry X) | 2020 | — | — | — | — | — | — | — | — | — | — | | Duality |
| "Nightcrawler" (featuring Say Lou Lou) | 2020 | — | — | — | — | — | — | — | — | — | — | | Duality |
| "The Chant" | 2023 | — | — | — | — | — | — | — | — | — | — | | Union |
| "Losing Control" (featuring Nathan Nicholson) | 2023 | — | — | — | — | — | — | — | — | — | — | | Non-album single |
| "Something on My Mind" (with Purple Disco Machine and Nothing but Thieves) | 2023 | — | — | — | — | — (Note: "Something on My Mind" did not enter the German Singles Chart, but peaked at number 12 on the Deutsche Single Trend Chart.) | — | — (Note: "Something on My Mind" did not enter the Single Top 100, but peaked at number 11 on the Single Tip chart.) | — | — | — | | Paradise |
| "Energy" | 2024 | — | — | — | — | — | — | — | — | — | — | | Union |
| "Ain't Giving Up" (featuring Clementine Douglas) | 2024 | — | — | — | — | — | — | — | — | — | — | | Union |
| "All My Life" (with Panama) | 2024 | — | — | — | — | — | — | — | — | — | — | | Union |
| "Your Loving" | 2025 | — | — | — | — | — | — | — | — | — | — | | Union |
| "I Need You Now" | 2025 | — | — | — | — | — | — | — | — | — | — | | Union |
| "Ain't No Game" | 2026 | — | — | — | — | — | — | — | — | — | — | | |
"—" denotes a single that did not chart or were not released.

=== Production credits ===
| Song | Year | Artist | Album |
|---|---|---|---|
| "Every Day Is a Holiday" | 2015 | Katy Perry | Non-album single |
| "Swish Swish" (featuring Nicki Minaj) | 2017 | Katy Perry | Witness |

=== Remixes ===
| Year | Title | Artist(s) |
|---|---|---|
| 2006 | "Yes Yes Y'all" | Mekon |
| 2006 | "We Run This" | Missy Elliott |
| 2008 | "The Deacon" | Idiotproof |
| 2008 | "Run It" | EPMD |
| 2008 | "Bathroom Gurgle" | Late of the Pier |
| 2008 | "Off Da Hook" | Jesse Garcia |
| 2009 | "Daniel" | Bat for Lashes |
| 2009 | "The Fear" | Lily Allen |
| 2009 | "Because of You" | Skunk Anansie |
| 2010 | "Epicentro" | Babe Terror |
| 2010 | "The Drop" (Duke Dumont's Move Like A Bullet Train Remix) | LA Riots |
| 2010 | "The Drop" (Duke Dumont's Thudding Like Elmer Remix) | LA Riots |
| 2011 | "Dollar Sign" | Gucci Mane |
| 2011 | "Two Doors Down" | Mystery Jets |
| 2011 | "Elephant & Castle" | Yes Wizard |
| 2011 | "Party's Over Los Angeles" | ZZT |
| 2011 | "Let There Be Light" | Justice |
| 2012 | "Everything Goes My Way" (Jesse Rose and Duke Dumont Re-Dub) | Metronomy |
| 2012 | "Black Sands" | Bonobo |
| 2012 | "When I See You Again" | Canyons |
| 2012 | "Smell the Vibe" | Beardyman |
| 2012 | "Keep It 1000" | Sinden |
| 2012 | "The Keepers" (Duke Dumont's Pour Hommes Remix) | Santigold |
| 2012 | "The Keepers" (Duke Dumont's Pour Femmes Remix) | Santigold |
| 2012 | "Your Drums, Your Love" | AlunaGeorge |
| 2013 | "Falling" | Haim |
| 2013 | "Here" (as Blasé Boys Club) | Syron |
| 2013 | "Need U (100%)" (as Blasé Boys Club) | Duke Dumont |
| 2013 | "Hold On" (as Blasé Boys Club) | Duke Dumont |
| 2013 | "Dim All the Lights" | Donna Summer |
| 2014 | "Love Sublime" | Tensnake featuring Nile Rodgers and Fiora |
| 2015 | "I Can't Lose" | Mark Ronson featuring Keyone Starr |
| 2015 | "Real Joy" | Fono |
| 2017 | "The Man" | The Killers |

== See also ==
- List of English musicians
- Blasé Boys Club, record company started by Dumont
