= Cole Plante =

American DJ (born 1996)

- Birth name: Matthew Cole Plante
- Born: November 8, 1996 (age 28)
- Origin: Los Angeles, California, United States
- Genres: Dance, EDM
- Occupation(s): Music producer, DJ
- Years active: 2007-present
- Labels: Hollywood, Teknicole
- Website: coleplante.com

Cole Plante is an American DJ/Producer from Los Angeles, California. He is currently signed to Hollywood Records and has contributed music to Disney movies and TV shows. Plante has played at Rain Nightclub in Las Vegas, Nevada and the Avalon Nightclub in Hollywood. Cole has shared the stage with DJs Paul Oakenfold and Avicii. He also performed at Lollapalooza 2013 alongside Skrillex and Steve Angello. He has also joined Demi Lovato on the "Neon Lights Tour" in 2014. Cole is currently the house DJ for the Teen Wolf recap talkshow "Wolf Watch" on MTV.

== Biography ==
Cole was born on November 8, 1996, to Josef and Vanessa Plante as Matthew Cole Plante, and has an older brother named Ethan. Cole began DJing when he was around 10 to 12 years old. While his family was moving between homes, Cole found Pioneer CDJs and a mixer among the boxes. He started tooling and playing with them. Eventually, he started making real music and began playing at clubs. He attended Beverly Hills High School in Beverly Hills, CA, graduating in 2015. In high school, he would perform at Homecoming and other events.

Plante made a guest appearance as himself in an episode of the Disney XD series Max Steel. He is also composer of the series.

== Discography ==
=== Singles ===
Title	Year	Peak chart positions	Album
Title	Year	US Dance	Album
"Bring Back the Boom"	2012	—	Non-album singles
"Non-Stop Summer" (with Adam Hicks)	2012	—	Non-album singles
"Forever" (with Matt Dzyacky)	2013	—	Non-album singles
"Lie To Me" (with Myon & Shane 54 feat. Koko Laroo)	2013	23	Non-album singles
"If I Fall" (with Myon & Shane 54 feat. Ruby O'Dell)	2014	36	Non-album singles
"Before I’m Yours" (feat. Brian Logan Dales)	2014	—	Non-album singles
"Teardrops" (with BOBI)	2016	40	Non-album singles

=== EPs ===
List of albums
Title	Album details
Colektiv	Release: 2014; Label: Hollywood Records; Format: CD, digital download
