= Lie to Me (Cole Plante song) =

Single by Cole Plante featuring Myon & Shane 54, Koko Laroo
- Released: 2013
- Recorded: 2013
- Genre: Electronic dance music, dance-pop
- Label: Teknicole Records
- Producer(s): Cole Plante, Myon & Shane 54

Cole Plante singles chronology
"Forever" (2012)	"Lie to Me" (2013)

"Lie to Me" is a song by American DJ Cole Plante from his debut EP, Colektiv. The song was produced by Plante and Myon & Shane 54. The track was released on July 30, 2013, via Beatport on Teknicole Records. The song was recorded in 2013. It reached number 1 on the Billboard Hot Dance Club Songs chart, in January 2014.

== Background ==
"Lie to Me" is a fast-tempo song with 128 bpm running throughout the song.

== Reception ==
"Lie to Me" has received very positive reception stating Plante's maturing sound is sounding better and complimenting Laroo's vocals.

== See also ==
- List of number-one dance singles of 2014 (U.S.)
