= Hot Chip discography =

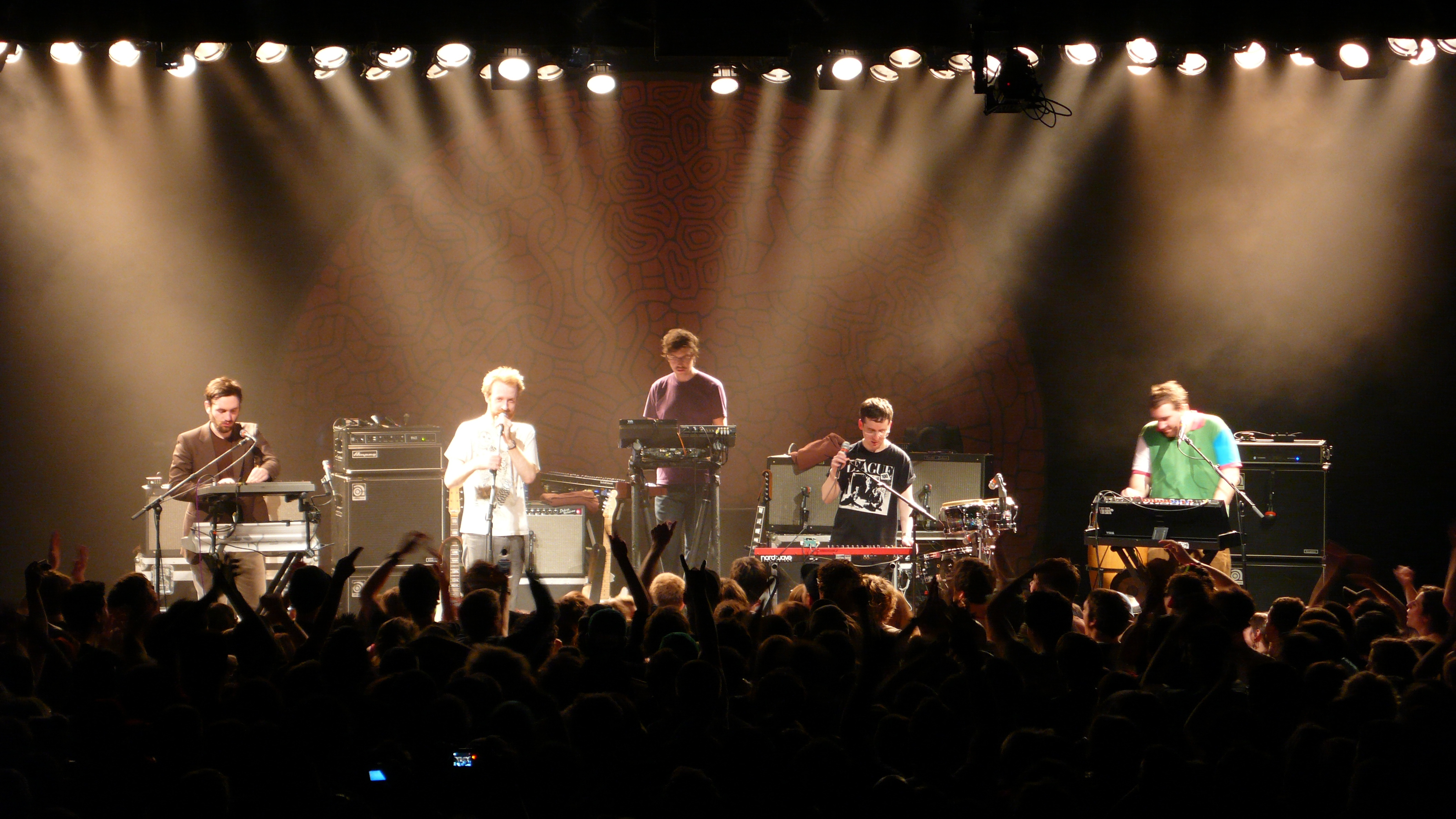
- Hot Chip performing in Vancouver, British Columbia, Canada in April 2008
- Studio albums: 8
- Extended plays: 8
- Compilation albums: 1
- Singles: 20
- Music videos: 17
- Mix albums: 2
- Promotional singles: 5

English synth-pop band Hot Chip have released eight studio albums, eight extended plays, two mix albums, two compilation albums, 29 singles, five promotional singles and 24 music videos.

== Albums ==
=== Studio albums ===
List of studio albums, with selected chart positions, sales figures and certifications
| Title | Album details | Peak chart positions | | | | | | | | | | Sales | Certifications |
| Title | Album details | UK | AUS | BEL (FL) | FRA | GER | IRE | SCO | SWE | SWI | US | Sales | Certifications |
|---|---|---|---|---|---|---|---|---|---|---|---|---|---|
| Coming on Strong | Released: 24 May 2004; Label: Moshi Moshi; Formats: CD, LP, digital download | — | — | — | — | — | — | — | — | — | — | | |
| The Warning | Released: 22 May 2006; Label: EMI; Formats: CD, LP, digital download | 34 | — | — | — | — | 42 | 28 | 38 | — | — | | BPI: Gold |
| Made in the Dark | Released: 4 February 2008; Label: EMI; Formats: CD, LP, digital download | 4 | 25 | 25 | 89 | 34 | 9 | 5 | 35 | — | 109 | UK: 118,433 | BPI: Gold |
| One Life Stand | Released: 29 January 2010; Label: Parlophone; Formats: CD, LP, digital download | 11 | 27 | 48 | 115 | 54 | 17 | 11 | 41 | 40 | 103 | | BPI: Silver |
| In Our Heads | Released: 6 June 2012; Label: Domino; Formats: CD, LP, digital download | 14 | 19 | 24 | 50 | 43 | 12 | 21 | 39 | 27 | 62 | | |
| Why Make Sense? | Released: 15 May 2015; Label: Domino; Formats: CD, LP, digital download | 13 | 29 | 30 | 85 | 38 | 19 | 13 | — | 53 | 103 | | |
| A Bath Full of Ecstasy | Released: 21 June 2019; Label: Domino; Formats: CD, LP, digital download | 11 | 59 | 105 | 142 | 52 | 61 | 9 | — | 48 | — (Note: A Bath Full of Ecstasy did not enter the US Billboard 200, but peaked at number 47 on the US Billboard Album Sales Chart.) | | |
| Freakout/Release | Released: 19 August 2022; Label: Domino; Formats: CD, LP, digital download | 16 | — | 120 | — (Note: Freakout/Release did not enter the French Album Top 200, but peaked at number 64 on the French Top Album Physiques chart.) | 45 | — | 10 | — | 99 | — (Note: Freakout/Release did not enter the US Billboard 200, but peaked at number 98 on the US Billboard Album Sales Chart.) | | |
| A Long Way from Kansas | Scheduled for release on 8 January 2027; Label: Domino | — | — | — | — | — | — | — | — | — | — | | |
"—" denotes a recording that did not chart or was not released in that territory.

=== Compilation albums ===
List of compilation albums, with selected chart positions
| Title | Album details | Peak chart positions | | | |
| Title | Album details | UK Sales | UK Indie | NED | SCO |
|---|---|---|---|---|---|
| Late Night Tales | Released: 8 September 2020; Label: Night Time Stories; Formats: CD, LP, digital download | — | — | 25 | — |
| Joy in Repetition | Released: 5 September 2025; Label: Domino; Formats: CD, LP, digital download | 15 | 10 | — | 18 |
"—" denotes a recording that did not chart or was not released in that territory.

=== Mix albums ===
| Title | Album details |
|---|---|
| DJ-Kicks: Hot Chip | Released: 18 May 2007; Label: Studio !K7; Formats: CD, LP, digital download |
| A Bugged Out Mix by Hot Chip | Released: 1 May 2009; Label: New State; Formats: CD, digital download |

== Extended plays ==
| Title | EP details | Peak chart positions |
| Title | EP details | UK Sales |
|---|---|---|
| Mexico EP | Released: March 2001; Label: Victory Garden; Format: CD | — |
| Sanfrandisco E-Pee | Released: 23 October 2002; Label: Ringsting; Format: CD-R | — |
| Down with Prince | Released: 2003; Label: Moshi Moshi; Formats: CD-R, 12" | — |
| Barbarian EP | Released: 17 October 2005; Label: EMI; Formats: CD-R, 12" | — |
| iTunes Live: Berlin Festival | Released: 23 May 2008; Label: Parlophone; Format: Digital download | — |
| Hot Chip with Robert Wyatt and Geese (with Robert Wyatt and Geese) | Released: 22 December 2008; Label: EMI; Format: CD | 49 |
| We Have Remixes | Released: 13 August 2010; Label: Parlophone; Formats: 12", digital download | 43 |
| Dancing in the Dark | Released: 23 October 2015; Label: Domino; Format: Digital download | — |

== Singles ==
=== As lead artist ===
List of singles, with selected chart positions, showing year released and album name
| Title | Year | Peak chart positions | | | | | | | | | | Certifications | Album |
| Title | Year | UK | AUS | BEL (FL) | BEL (WA) | FRA | IRE | MEX | SCO | SWI | US Dance | Certifications | Album |
|---|---|---|---|---|---|---|---|---|---|---|---|---|---|
| "Playboy" | 2004 | 102 | — | — | — | — | — | — | — | — | — | | Coming on Strong |
| "Hittin Skittles" | 2004 | — | — | — | — | — | — | — | — | — | — | | Non-album single |
| "Over and Over" | 2006 | 27 | — (Note: "Over and Over" did not enter the Australian ARIA Singles Chart but peaked at number seven on the ARIA Hitseekers Chart.) | — | — | — | 44 | — | 21 | — | 10 | BPI: Silver | The Warning |
| "Boy from School" | 2006 | 40 | — | — | — | — | — | — | 26 | — | 14 | | The Warning |
| "Colours" | 2006 | — | — (Note: "Colours" did not enter the Australian ARIA Singles Chart but peaked at number six on the ARIA Hitseekers Chart.) | — | — | — | — | — | — | — | — | | The Warning |
| "My Piano" | 2007 | — | — | — | — | — | — | — | — | — | — | | DJ-Kicks: Hot Chip |
| "Shake a Fist" | 2007 | — | — | — | — | — | — | — | — | — | — | | Made in the Dark |
| "Ready for the Floor" | 2008 | 6 | 92 | 52 | 67 | — | 22 | — | 7 | 76 | — | BPI: Silver | Made in the Dark |
| "One Pure Thought" | 2008 | 53 | — | — | — | — | — | — | 11 | — | — | | Made in the Dark |
| "Hold On" | 2008 | — | — | — | — | — | — | — | — | — | 5 | | Made in the Dark |
| "One Life Stand" | 2009 | 41 | — | 54 | 68 | — | — | 10 | 45 | 99 | — | | One Life Stand |
| "I Feel Better" | 2010 | 115 | — | 57 | — | — | — | 13 | — | — | — (Note: "I Feel Better" did not enter the Hot Dance/Electronic Songs Chart, but peaked at number 20 on the Dance Club Songs chart.) | | One Life Stand |
| "I Feel Bonnie" (Note: "I Feel Bonnie" was released as a limited-edition 7" single for Record Store Day 2010.) (featuring Bonnie 'Prince' Billy) | 2010 | — (Note: "I Feel Bonnie" did not enter the UK Singles Chart, but peaked at number 35 on the UK Physical Singles Chart Top 100.) | — | — | — | — | — | — | — | — | — | | Non-album single |
| "Flutes" | 2012 | — (Note: "Flutes" did not enter the UK Singles Chart, but peaked at number 40 on the UK Physical Singles Chart.) | — | — | — | 137 | — | — | — | — | — | | In Our Heads |
| "Night & Day" | 2012 | — (Note: "Night & Day" did not enter the UK Singles Chart, but peaked at number 13 on the UK Physical Singles Chart.) | — | 80 | — | — | — | 39 | — | — | — | | In Our Heads |
| "How Do You Do?" | 2012 | — | — | 109 | — | — | — | — | — | — | — | | In Our Heads |
| "Don't Deny Your Heart" | 2012 | — (Note: "Don't Deny Your Heart" did not enter the UK Singles Chart, but peaked at number 56 on the UK Physical Singles Chart Top 100.) | — | 85 | — | — | — | — | — | — | — | | In Our Heads |
| "Look at Where We Are" (Major Lazer Remix) | 2012 | — (Note: "Look at Where We Are" did not enter the UK Singles Chart, but peaked at number 41 on the UK Physical Singles Chart.) | — | — | — | — | — | — | — | — | — | | In Our Heads |
| "Dark and Stormy" | 2013 | — (Note: "Dark and Stormy" did not enter the UK Singles Chart, but peaked at number 5 on the UK Physical Singles Chart.) | — | — | — | — | — | — | — | — | — | | Non-album single |
| "Huarache Lights" | 2015 | — (Note: "Huarache Lights" did not enter the UK Singles Chart, but peaked at number 17 on the UK Physical Singles Chart.) | — | 125 | — | — | — | 18 | — | — | — | | Why Make Sense? |
| "Need You Now" | 2015 | — (Note: "Need You Now" did not enter the UK Singles Chart, but peaked at number 20 on the UK Physical Singles Chart.) | — | 120 | 78 | 184 | — | 48 | — | — | — | | Why Make Sense? |
| "Started Right" | 2015 | — | — | — | — | — | — | — | — | — | — | | Why Make Sense? |
| "Hungry Child" | 2019 | — | — | — (Note: "Hungry Child" did not enter the Ultratop Top 50, but charted as an "extra tip" on the Ultratip chart.) | — | — | — | 11 | — | — | — | | A Bath Full of Ecstasy |
| "Melody of Love" | 2019 | — | — | — | — (Note: "Melody of Love" did not enter the Ultratop Top 50, but charted as an "extra tip" on the Ultratip chart.) | — | — | — | — | — | — | | A Bath Full of Ecstasy |
| "Bath Full of Ecstasy" | 2019 | — | — | — | — | — | — | — | — | — | — | | A Bath Full of Ecstasy |
| "Straight to the Morning" (featuring Jarvis Cocker) | 2020 | — (Note: "Straight to the Morning" did not enter the UK Singles Chart, but peaked at number 98 on the UK Singles Sales Chart Top 100.) | — | — | — | — | — | — | — | — | — (Note: "Straight to the Morning" did not enter the Hot Dance/Electronic Songs Chart, but peaked at number 22 on the Dance/Mix Show Airplay chart.) | | Non-album single |
| "Down" | 2022 | — | — | — | — | — | — | — | — | — | — | | Freakout/Release |
| "Eleanor" | 2022 | — | — | — | — | — | — | — | — | — | — | | Freakout/Release |
| "Broken" | 2022 | — | — | — | — | — | — | — | — | — | — | | Freakout/Release |
| "Devotion" | 2025 | — | — | — | — | — | — | — | — | — | — | | Joy in Repetition |
| "Random Violence" | 2026 | — | — | — | — | — | — | — | — | — | — | | A Long Way from Kansas |
| "Me in Your Head" (featuring Beth Ditto) | 2026 | — | — | — | — | — | — | — | — | — | — | | A Long Way from Kansas |
"—" denotes a recording that did not chart or was not released in that territory.

=== Promotional singles ===
| Title | Year | Peak chart positions | | | Album |
| Title | Year | ICE | MEX Eng. | US Sales | Album |
|---|---|---|---|---|---|
| "No Fit State" | 2006 | — | — | — | The Warning |
| "Normal" | 2007 | — | — | — | Non-album singles |
| "Take It In" | 2009 | — | 49 | — | One Life Stand |
| "Dancing in the Dark" | 2015 | — | — | 14 | Dancing in the Dark |
| "Eleanor" | 2022 | 30 | — | — | Freakout/Release |
"—" denotes a recording that did not chart or was not released in that territory.

== Guest appearances ==
List of non-single guest appearances, showing year released and album name
| Title | Year | Collaborating artist | Album |
|---|---|---|---|
| "No More Master" | 2005 | | Kitsuné X |
| "I Can't Wake Up" | 2006 | | See You on the Moon!: Songs for Kids of All Ages |
| "No" | 2007 | David Shrigley | Worried Noodles |
| "Babongo Tribe Remix" | 2008 | The Babongo Tribe | Bruce Parry Presents: Amazon Tribe - Songs For Survival |
| "Day Is Done" | 2008 | Jesse Rose | What Do You Do If You Don't? |
| "Forget My Name" | 2008 | Jesse Rose | What Do You Do If You Don't? |
| "Step By Step" | 2008 | Wiley | See Clear Now |
| "Transmission" (Joy Division cover) | 2009 | | War Child Presents Heroes |
| "Wearing My Rolex" (Wiley cover) | 2009 | | Radio 1's Live Lounge – Volume 4 |
| "All + All Together" | 2010 | Kano | Method to the Maadness |
| "Atomic Bomb" (William Onyeabor cover) | 2014 | | What?! |
| "Go Bang" (Dinosaur L cover) | 2014 | | Master Mix: Red Hot + Arthur Russell |

== Remixes ==
- 2004: "Biting Tongues" by Faultline
- 2004: "Where I Belong" by Sia
- 2004: "Take Your Mama" by Scissor Sisters
- 2004: "Ladyflash" by The Go! Team
- 2004: "Perspective" by Kevin Mark Trail
- 2004: "TKO" by Le Tigre
- 2004: "Like It or Leave It" by Chikinki
- 2005: "Bootprints" by King Creosote
- 2005: "Destroy Everything You Touch" by Ladytron
- 2005: "Do As You Please" by Diefenbach
- 2005: "Do the Whirlwind" by Architecture in Helsinki
- 2005: "U.R.A.Q.T." by M.I.A.
- 2005: "Easy/Lucky/Free" by Bright Eyes
- 2005: "Multiply" by Jamie Lidell
- 2005: "Passer By" by Mattafix
- 2005: "Roxxy" by Brooks
- 2005: "Voodoo" by Chungking
- 2006: "Kids with Guns" by Gorillaz
- 2006: "Kindling for the Master" by Stephen Malkmus
- 2006: "Launch Yourself" by Adem
- 2006: "Nothing's Gonna Change Your Mind" by Badly Drawn Boy
- 2006: "Rehab" by Amy Winehouse
- 2006: "Right Where You Are" by Amp Fiddler
- 2006: "Slowly" by Max Sedgley
- 2006: "Steppin Out" by Lo-Fi-Fnk
- 2006: "Tendency" by Battle
- 2006: "Tetanus Crisis" by Dondolo
- 2006: "Walking Machine" by Revl9n
- 2006: "Arm In Arm" by The Boggs
- 2006: "Darko" by Booka Shade
- 2006: "My Patch" by Jim Noir
- 2006: "Who Needs Actions When You Got Words" by Plan B
- 2006: "Let's Make Love and Listen to Death from Above" by CSS
- 2006: "Enemies Like This" by Radio 4
- 2006: "War of the Worlds" by Get Cape. Wear Cape. Fly
- 2007: "In the Morning" by Junior Boys
- 2007: "Mouthwash" by Kate Nash
- 2007: "Gabriel Prokofiev's String Quartet No. 1: III" by The Elysian Quartet
- 2007: "Girls & Boys in Love" by The Rumble Strips
- 2007: "I'm Free" by The Rolling Stones
- 2007: "No Stoppin" by M.A.N.D.Y.
- 2007: "I'm Designer" by Queens of the Stone Age
- 2007: "Must Be the Moon" by !!!
- 2007: "No More Mornings" by Spring Tides
- 2007: "Robot Man" by The Aliens
- 2007: "Sing Songs Along" by Tilly and the Wall
- 2007: "Don & Sherri" by Matthew Dear
- 2007: "Woop Woop" by The Chap
- 2007: "Aerodynamik / La Forme" by Kraftwerk
- 2007: "Quick and Painful" by Free Blood
- 2007: "Flicker 33.3" by Tussle
- 2007: "She's the One" by Caribou
- 2007: "King's Cross" by Tracey Thorn
- 2007: "Breakin' Up" by Rilo Kiley
- 2007: "Oi New York This Is London" by David E. Sugar
- 2007: "Felt Tip" by Love Is All
- 2008: "Trick for Treat" by Neon Neon
- 2008: "Passin' Me By" by The Pharcyde
- 2008: "Stuck On You" by Little Boots
- 2008: "Drive Your Car" by Grovesnor
- 2008: "Morning Light" By Sian Alice Group
- 2008: "Sad Song" By Au Revoir Simone
- 2008: "Heartbeat" by Late of the Pier
- 2008: "Winter Home Disco" by The Pictish Trail
- 2008: "Midnight Request Line" by Skream
- 2008: "Let the Spirit" by Roots Manuva
- 2008: "Kalemba (Wegue Wegue)" by Buraka Som Sistema
- 2008: "TV Friend" by WhoMadeWho
- 2008: "Life on the Beach" by Envelopes
- 2008: "The Don" by Sisters Of Transistors
- 2008: "This Summer Night" by Robert Wyatt & Bertrand Burgalat
- 2009: "Day Is Done" by Jesse Rose
- 2009: "House Jam" by Gang Gang Dance
- 2009: "We Are Electric" by Fischerspooner
- 2010: "Kisses" by Kisses
- 2010: "City of Blinding Lights" by U2
- 2010: "Hot-n-Fun" by N.E.R.D.
- 2011: "Losing My Patience" by Shit Robot
- 2011: "Drugs" by Kool Keith
- 2012: "H2O" by Dominik Eulberg
- 2012: "The Healing" by James Zabiela
- 2013: "Sunset People" by Donna Summer
- 2013: "My Number" by Foals
- 2013: "Big Love" by Matthew E. White
- 2014: "TV Trouble" by Black Bananas
- 2014: "Satellite" by Nine Inch Nails
- 2015: "Queen of Peace" by Florence and the Machine
- 2015: "Tutti Frutti" by New Order
- 2017: "Chained to the Rhythm" by Katy Perry
- 2017: "From: Disco to: Disco" by Whirlpool Productions
- 2018: "My My My!" by Troye Sivan
- 2020: "Think About Things" by Daði Freyr
- 2020: "Enola Gay" by Orchestral Manoeuvres in the Dark
- 2020: "Dead Horse" by Hayley Williams
- 2020: "Glowing in the Dark" by Django Django
- 2021: "Sundial" by Para One
- 2021: "Disco Man" by Remi Wolf
- 2021: "GLY" by Catching Flies
- 2021: "Your Love" by Selbor
- 2021: "Last Chance" by Casper Caan
- 2021: "I am not a woman, I'm a god" by Halsey
- 2021: "House Music All Night Long" by Jarvis Cocker
- 2022: "Be My Husband" by Nina Simone
- 2023: "Wide Awake" by ODESZA
- 2025: "TGIF" by Disgusting Sisters

== Music videos ==
List of music videos, showing year released and directors
| Title | Year | Director(s) |
|---|---|---|
| "Down with Prince" | 2004 | Matt Fretwell |
| "Playboy" | 2004 | The Imaginary Tennis Club |
| "Over and Over" | 2006 | Nima Nourizadeh |
| "Boy from School" | 2006 | Garth Jennings |
| "Colours" | 2006 | Nima Nourizadeh |
| "Ready for the Floor" | 2007 | Nima Nourizadeh |
| "One Pure Thought" | 2008 | Martin & Youle |
| "One Life Stand" | 2010 | Roel Wouters |
| "I Feel Better" | 2010 | Peter Serafinowicz |
| "Night & Day" | 2012 | Peter Serafinowicz |
| "Look at Where We Are" | 2012 | Danny Perez |
| "How Do You Do?" | 2012 | Rollo Jackson |
| "Don't Deny Your Heart" | 2012 | Peter Serafinowicz |
| "Huarache Lights" | 2015 | Andy Knowles |
| "Need You Now" | 2015 | Shynola |
| "Started Right" | 2015 | Rollo Jackson |
| "Dancing in the Dark" | 2015 | Kieran Evans |
| "Hungry Child" | 2019 | Saman Kesh |
| "Melody of Love" | 2019 | Nima Nourizadeh |
| "Spell" | 2019 | Simon Owens |
| "Bath Full of Ecstasy" | 2019 | Oliver Payne |
| "Positive" | 2020 | Sebastian Strasser |
| "Down" | 2022 | Douglas Hart and Steve Mackey |
| "Eleanor" | 2022 | Alice Kong |
| "Broken" | 2022 | Maxim Kelly |
| "Devotion" | 2025 | Will Kindrick |
