= PLUG Independent Music Awards =

American music award

The PLUG Independent Music Awards, or simply PLUG Awards, began in 2001 as a "cartel" of music lovers ranging from DJs and managers to indie music retailers and fans.

== Winners ==
=== Album of the Year ===
Year	Recipient	Nominee
2005	TV on the Radio, Desperate Youth, Blood Thirsty Babes	
2006	Sufjan Stevens, Illinois	
2007	Band of Horses, Everything All the Time	
2008	Arcade Fire, Neon Bible	

=== Americana Album of the Year ===
Year	Recipient	Nominee
2005	Iron & Wine, Our Endless Numbered Days	
2006	Calexico & Iron & Wine, In the Reins	
2007	Band of Horses, Everything All the Time	
2008	Iron & Wine, The Shepherd's Dog	

=== Avant Album of the Year ===
Year	Recipient	Nominee
2005	Liars, They Were Wrong, So We Drowned	
2006	Animal Collective, Feels	
2007	Xiu Xiu, The Air Force	
2008	Liars, Liars	

=== DJ Album of the Year ===
Year	Recipient	Nominee
2005	RJD2, Since We Last Spoke	
2006	DJ Shadow, One Night in Bangkok	
2007	Girl Talk, Night Ripper	
2008	Hot Chip, DJ-Kicks: Hot Chip	

=== Electronic/Dance Album of the Year ===
Year	Recipient	Nominee
2005	Mouse on Mars, Radical Connector	
2006	M83, Before the Dawn Heals Us	
2007	Thom Yorke, The Eraser	
2008	Justice, Cross	

=== Hip-Hop Album of the Year ===
Year	Recipient	Nominee
2005	Madvillain, Madvillainy	
2006	Danger Doom, The Mouse and the Mask	
2007	Spank Rock, YoYoYoYoYo	
2008	Aesop Rock, None Shall Pass	

=== Indie Rock Album of the Year ===
Year	Recipient	Nominee
2005	Interpol, Antics	
2006	Bloc Party, Silent Alarm	
2007	Yo La Tengo, I Am Not Afraid of You and I Will Beat Your Ass	
2008	Animal Collective, Strawberry Jam	

=== Metal Album of the Year ===
Year	Recipient	Nominee
2005	The Dillinger Escape Plan, Miss Machine	
2006	Fantômas, Suspended Animation	
2007	Melvins, (A) Senile Animal	
2008	The Dillinger Escape Plan, Ire Works	

=== Punk Album of the Year ===
Year	Recipient	Nominee
2005	Bad Religion, The Empire Strikes First	
2006	Sleater-Kinney, The Woods	
2007	CSS, Cansei de Ser Sexy	
2008	Gogol Bordello, Super Taranta!	

=== Album Art/Packaging of the Year ===
Year	Recipient	Nominees
2005	Arcade Fire, Funeral	
2006	Sufjan Stevens, Illinois	
2007	Hot Chip, The Warning	
2008	Menomena, Friend and Foe	

=== Music DVD of the Year ===
Year	Recipient	Nominees
2005	Fat Wreck Chords, Rock Against Bush, Vol. 2	
2006	The Flaming Lips, The Fearless Freaks	
2007	Pixies, loudQUIETloud	

=== Music Video of the Year ===
Year	Recipient	Nominees
2006	The Decemberists, "Sixteen Military Wives"	
2007	Wolf Parade, "I'll Believe in Anything"	CSS, "Let's Make Love and Listen to Death from Above"; Danielson, "Did I Step on Your Trumpet"; Eagles of Death Metal, "I Want You So Hard (Boy's Bad News)"; Heavy Blinkers, "Try Telling that to My Baby"; I Love You but I've Chosen Darkness, "The Owl"; The Knife, "We Share Our Mothers' Health"; Midlake, "Young Bride"; Peeping Tom, "Mojo"; The Pipettes, "Your Kisses Are Wasted on Me"; Vitalic, "Poney Part 1"
2008	Battles, "Atlas"	

=== Song of the Year ===
Year	Recipient	Nominees
2007	Band of Horses, "The Funeral"	Arctic Monkeys, "I Bet You Look Good on the Dancefloor"; The Coup, "Laugh/Love/Fuck"; Gossip, "Standing in the Way of Control"; Hot Chip, "Boy from School"; Hot Chip, "Over and Over"; Jenny Lewis And The Watson Twins, "Rise Up with Fists!!"; The Knife, "We Share Our Mothers' Health"; Midlake, "Roscoe"; Peter Bjorn and John featuring Victoria Bergsman, "Young Folks"; Silversun Pickups, "Lazy Eye"; Tokyo Police Club, "Nature of the Experiment"
2008	The National, "Fake Empire"	

=== Artist of the Year ===
Year	Recipient	Nominees
2005	Interpol	
2006	Bright Eyes	
2007	J Dilla	
2008	Radiohead	

=== New Artist of the Year ===
Year	Recipient	Nominees
2008	Justice	
2007	Arctic Monkeys	
2006	Clap Your Hands Say Yeah	
2005	Arcade Fire	

=== Live Act of the Year ===
Year	Recipient	Nominees
2005	Death Cab for Cutie	
2006	Arcade Fire	
2007	Broken Social Scene	
2008	Arcade Fire	

=== Female Artist of the Year ===
Year	Recipient	Nominees
2005	Jean Grae	
2006	Neko Case	
2007	Neko Case	
2008	St. Vincent	

=== Male Artist of the Year ===
Year	Recipient	Nominees
2005	Tom Waits	
2006	Sufjan Stevens	
2007	Sufjan Stevens	
2008	Andrew Bird	

=== 2005 ===
- PLUG Artist Impact Award: The Flaming Lips
- Record Producer of the Year: Danger Mouse
- Record Label of the Year: Definitive Jux
- Music Website of the Year: Pitchfork
- Magazine of the Year: The Wire
- College/Non-Comm Radio Station of the Year: KEXP-FM, Seattle, Washington
- Record Store of the Year: Amoeba Music, Hollywood, California
- Specialty Show of the Year: KDLD, Los Angeles, California – Dead Air
- Internet Radio Station of the Year: WOXY.com

=== 2006 ===
- PLUG Artist Impact Award: The Flaming Lips
- Record Producer of the Year: Danger Mouse
- Record Label of the Year: Sub Pop
- Music Festival of the Year : Coachella
- Music Website of the Year: Myspace
- Magazine of the Year: Paste
- College/Non-Comm Radio Station of the Year: KEXP-FM, Seattle, Washington
- Record Store of the Year: Amoeba Music, Hollywood, California
- Zine of the Year: Wax Poetics
- Specialty Show of the Year: WXPN, Philadelphia, Pennsylvania – World Café with David Dye
- Internet Radio Station of the Year: indie1031.fm

=== 2007 ===
- Record Producer of the Year: J Dilla
- Record Label of the Year: Sub Pop
- Live Music Venue of the Year: Bowery Ballroom, New York City
- Music Festival of the Year: South by Southwest
- Music Website of the Year: Pitchfork
- Music Blog of the Year: BrooklynVegan
- Magazine of the Year: Paste
- College/Non-Comm Radio Station of the Year: KEXP-FM, Seattle, Washington
- Record Store of the Year: Amoeba Music, Hollywood, California
- Zine of the Year: Wax Poetics
- Specialty Show of the Year: Sirius Left of Center – Blog Radio
- Podcast of the Year: WOXY.com – Lounge Acts
- Internet Radio Station of the Year: WOXY.com
- Online Radio Station of the Year (with Terrestrial Counterpart): KEXP-FM, Seattle
- Online Record Store of the Year: Amazon.com

=== 2008 ===
- Record Label of the Year: Merge Records
- Live Music Venue of the Year: Bowery Ballroom, New York City
- Music Festival of the Year: Coachella Valley Music and Arts Festival
- Music Website of the Year: Pitchfork
- Music Blog of the Year: Stereogum
- Magazine of the Year: Paste
- College/Non-Comm Radio Station of the Year: KEXP-FM, Seattle, Washington
- Record Store of the Year: Other Music, New York City
- Zine of the Year: Wax Poetics
- Specialty Show of the Year: Sirius Left of Center – Blog Radio
- Online Radio Station of the Year: KCRW, Santa Monica, California
- Online Record Store of the Year: iTunes
