= Joe Goddard (musician) =

British musician, songwriter, and DJ (born 1979)

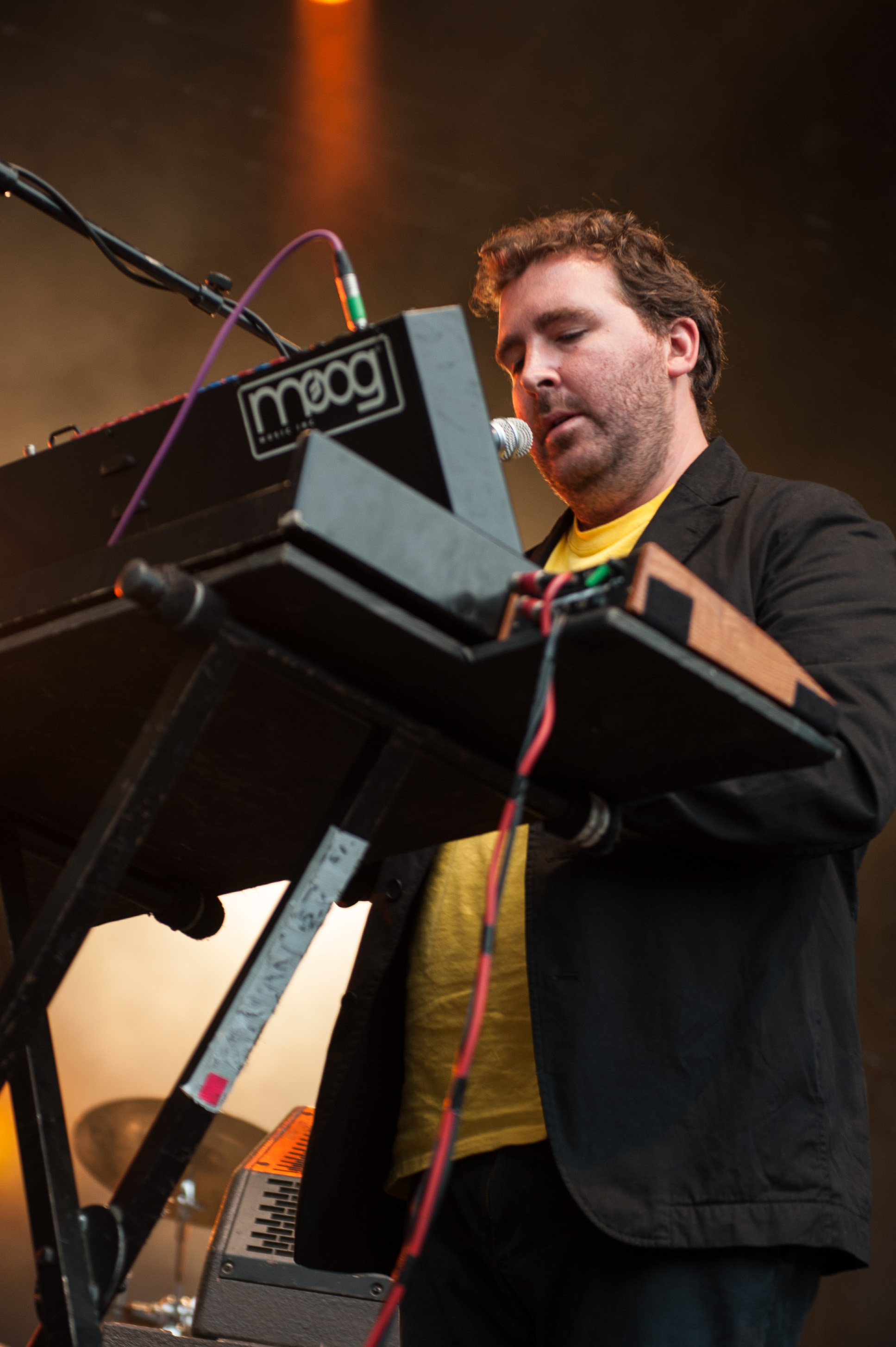
- Goddard performing with Hot Chip in 2013

Background information
- Born: Joseph Goddard; 12 September 1979 (age 46); London, England
- Origin: London, England
- Genres: Indietronica; synth-pop; house; alternative dance
- Occupations: Musician; songwriter
- Instruments: Synthesiser; vocals
- Years active: 1998–present
- Labels: Greco Roman; Domino; Southern Fried; EMI; Moshi Moshi

Joe Goddard (born 12 September 1979) is a British musician, songwriter, and DJ. He is best known as a member of the English synth-pop band Hot Chip, which he co-founded with Alexis Taylor. In 2007, he co-founded record label Greco-Roman, which has released albums by artists such as Totally Enormous Extinct Dinosaurs and Disclosure. Goddard is also a member of electronica group the 2 Bears, and produced three solo albums, Harvest Festival (2009), Electric Lines (2017) and Harmonics (2024).

== Career ==
Goddard is one of the founding members of Hot Chip. Started with school friend Alexis Taylor, they released their first album Coming on Strong in 2004. After the album's release, Hot Chip gained three new members: Owen Clarke, Felix Martin, and Al Doyle, all of whom had played on the album. Their second album, The Warning, gained the band more mainstream attention.

In 2021, Goddard teamed up with sometime Horse Meat Disco vocalist Amy Douglas to form Hard Feelings (stylised as HARD FEELINGS), a duo who aim to mix dance music with synthpop and the new wave sounds of the early 1980s, on tracks like "Holding on Too Long" and "Dangerous". The duo's debut album is also called HARD FEELINGS and was released by Domino on 5 November 2021.

Goddard's third solo album Harmonics was released on 12 July 2024 and features appearances from Hayden Thorpe, Ibibio Sound Machine, Alabaster DePlume, Tom McFarland of Jungle and his Hot Chip bandmates Alexis Taylor and Al Doyle.

== Discography ==
List of albums, with selected details and chart positions shown
Title	Details	Peak chart positions		
Title	Details	UK	BEL (FL)	SWI
Harvest Festival	Released: 8 November 2009; Label: Greco-Roman; Formats: CD, digital download	—	—	—
Electric Lines	Released: 21 April 2017; Label: Domino; Formats: CD, 2×LP, digital download, streaming	77	54	85
Harmonics	Released: 12 July 2024; Label: Domino; Formats: CD, digital download	—	—	—

== EPs ==
Title	Release details
Apple Bobbing	Released: 8 November 2009; Label: Greco-Roman; Formats: Digital download, 12"
Gabriel	Released: 31 July 2011; Label: Greco-Roman; Formats: Digital download, 12"
Taking Over	Released: 17 June 2013; Label: Greco-Roman; Formats: Digital download, 12"
Endless Love	Released: 25 June 2014; Label: Greco-Roman; Formats: Digital download, 12"
Lasers	Released: 14 October 2016; Label: Greco-Roman; Formats: Digital download, 12"
Pull the Plug	Released: 8 March 2019; Label: Against Fascist Tracks; Formats: Digital download
Kinetic	Released: 9 May 2025; Label: Domino; Formats: Digital download, streaming, 12"
