= Al Doyle =

British musician

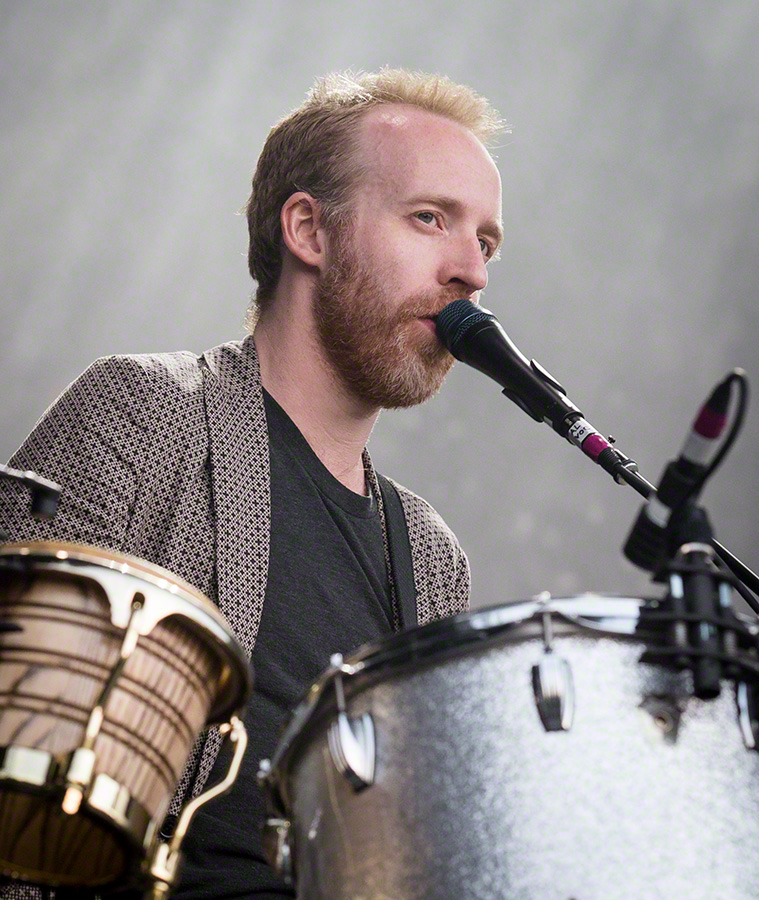
- Doyle performing with LCD Soundsystem in 2016

Background information
- Born: Alexander John Joseph Doyle; 28 August 1980 (age 46); Leeds, England
- Origin: London, England
- Genres: Indietronica; alternative dance; electropop; dance-punk
- Occupation: Musician
- Instruments: Guitar; vocals; keyboards; bass; drums; percussion; flugelhorn; cello; mandolin
- Years active: 2003–present
- Labels: Domino; DFA; Sunday Best; Lanark
- Member of: Hot Chip; LCD Soundsystem; New Build

Alexander John Joseph Doyle (born 28 August 1980) is a British musician. He is best known as the guitarist and keyboardist for English synth-pop band Hot Chip and American rock band LCD Soundsystem. He is also a founding member of British electronic band New Build.

== Early life ==
Doyle took piano and cello lessons from as young as 5 or 6 years old. He lost interest in these instruments as he began studying at university, when he began teaching himself other instruments, such as the guitar, drums, and bass guitar, and learned how to create music with computers. Doyle later won a place at Sidney Sussex College, Cambridge to read English alongside future Hot Chip bandmate Felix Martin. He was, for a time, university flatmates with comedian Alex Horne.

== Career ==
=== Hot Chip ===
Doyle joined British indie electronic band Hot Chip in 2003 before the recording session for their debut studio album, Coming on Strong (2004). Band co-founder Alexis Taylor called him to invite him to join the band while Doyle was unemployed and living in London, and he accepted. He remains a member of Hot Chip as of the release of Freakout/Release (2022), their eighth studio album.

=== LCD Soundsystem ===
Soon after the release of their self-titled debut studio album, Doyle joined American rock band LCD Soundsystem as a live member, as noted in the liner notes of their second studio album, Sound of Silver (2007). He would go on to play the Yamaha CS-60 and guitar on their 2010 song "You Wanted a Hit", the sixth track from their third studio album, This Is Happening (2010). In 2011, band frontman James Murphy announced that they were disbanding and would perform a farewell show at Madison Square Garden, where Doyle also played. The band would reunite, however, in 2015, to release a new album. Doyle became a much more prominent studio member of the band during the recording sessions, receiving writing credits on seven tracks out of the album's ten, and performing several instruments, including piano, cello, bowed mandolin, and electronic drums. The album, titled American Dream, was released on 1 September 2017.

=== New Build ===
Following LCD Soundsystem's disbandment in 2011, Doyle created the band New Build along with Hot Chip member Felix Martin and audio engineer Tom Hopkins. On 5 March 2012, they released their debut studio album, Yesterday Was Lived and Lost. They released a second studio album, Pour It On, on 20 October 2014.

=== Solo ===
Doyle released his debut solo album Hollywood Savior on November 20, 2026, recorded in his East London studio, Relax and Enjoy, and released by DFA on digital and vinyl formats.

== Discography ==
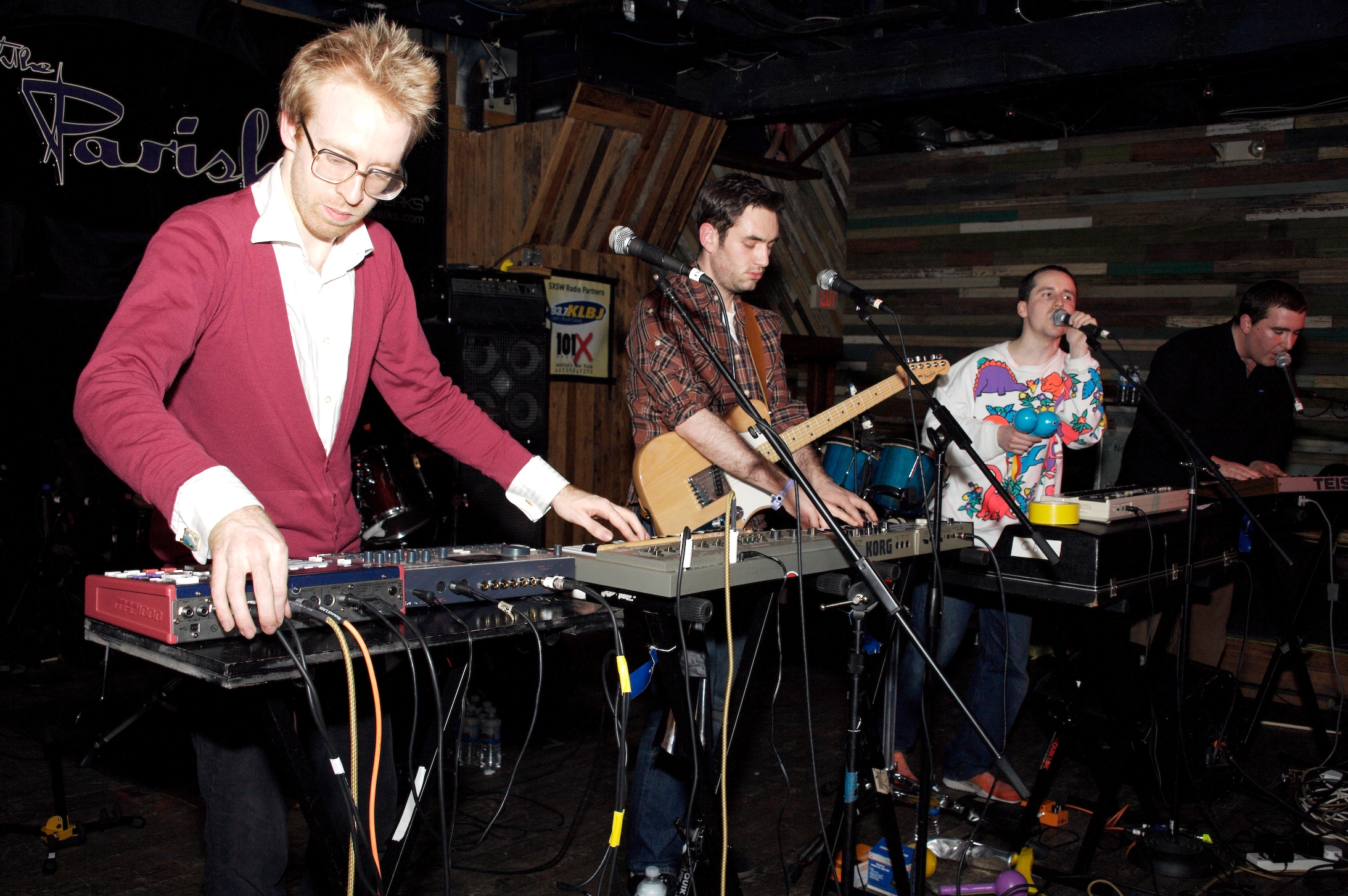
Doyle (far left) performing with Hot Chip in 2006

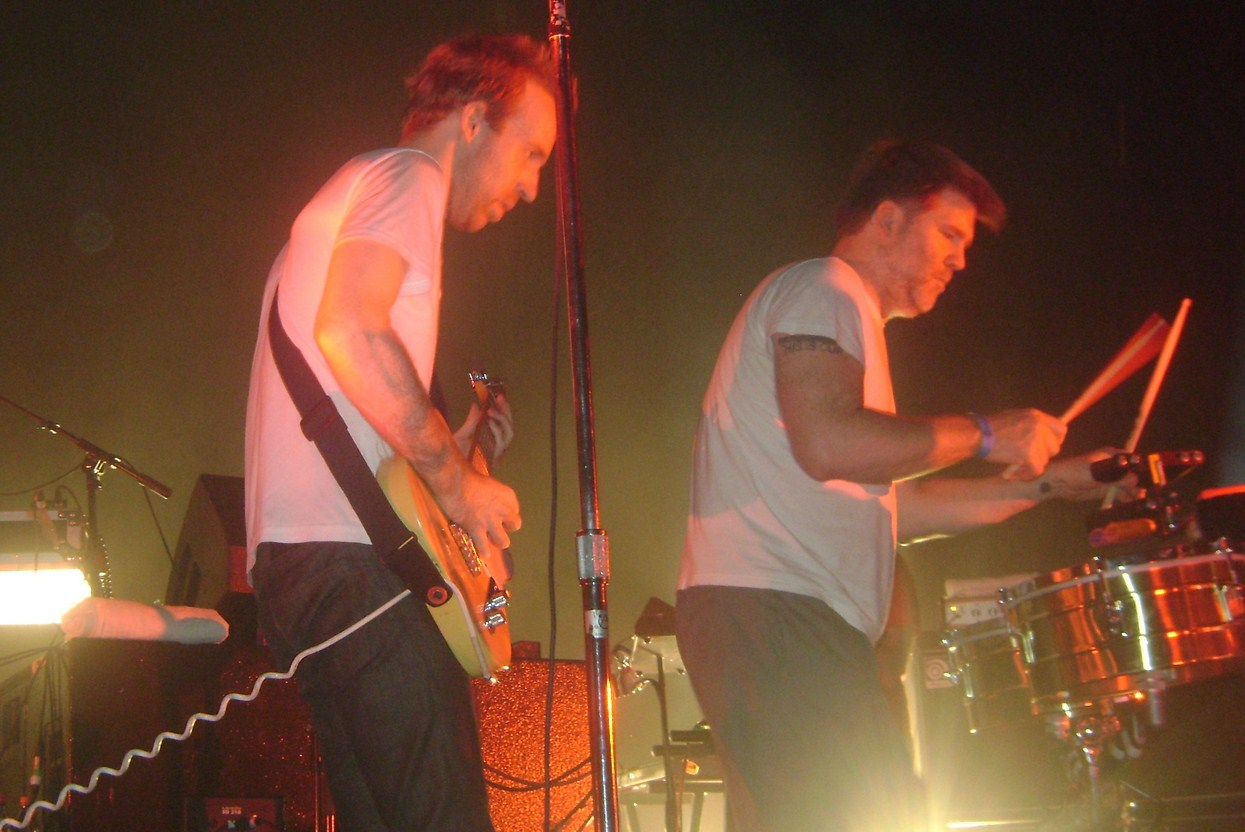
Doyle with James Murphy (right), performing with LCD Soundsystem in 2011

With Hot Chip

- Coming on Strong (2004)
- The Warning (2006)
- Made in the Dark (2008)
- One Life Stand (2010)
- In Our Heads (2012)
- Why Make Sense? (2015)
- A Bath Full of Ecstasy (2019)
- Freakout/Release (2022)

With LCD Soundsystem

- This Is Happening (2010)
- American Dream (2017)
- Electric Lady Sessions (2019)

With New Build

- Yesterday Was Lived and Lost (2012)
- Pour It On (2014)
