= Late Night Tales: Hot Chip =

Compilation album by Hot Chip
- Released: 2 October 2020
- Genres: Electronic, ambient
- Length: 72:06
- Label: Night Time Stories

Hot Chip chronology
A Bath Full of Ecstasy (2019)	Late Night Tales: Hot Chip (2020)	Freakout/Release (2022)

Late Night Tales chronology
Late Night Tales: Floating Points (2019)	Late Night Tales: Hot Chip (2020)	Late Night Tales: Khruangbin (2020)

Professional ratings
Review scores
Source	Rating
AllMusic	4/5 stars
Crack	7/10
PopMatters	6/10 stars

Late Night Tales: Hot Chip is a DJ mix album compiled by synth-pop band Hot Chip under the Night Time Stories label. The album, like others in the series, is composed of songs chosen by the band, songs performed by the band themselves, and a final track that sequences every song into one mix. It has received positive reception.

== Track listing ==
Adapted from Bandcamp release:

LateNightTales: Hot Chip
No.	Title	Original artist	Length
1.	"At Dawn"	Christina Vantzou	2:50
2.	"Nothing's Changed"	Hot Chip	4:36
3.	"King in My Empire" (featuring Cornell Campbell)	Rhythm & Sound	6:26
4.	"Have You Passed Through This Night"	Pale Blue	6:20
5.	"Femme Cosmic"	Suzanne Kraft	4:42
6.	"To the Moon and Back"	Fever Ray	4:37
7.	"Much to Touch"	Planningtorock	4:42
8.	"1,618"	Charlotte Adigéry	5:58
9.	"Hey Moloko"	Mike Salta	8:12
10.	"Somewhere I Have Never Travelled (for Coral Evans)"	Matthew Bourne	7:08
11.	"Candy Says" (The Velvet Underground cover)	Hot Chip	3:30
12.	"Who I Am & Why I Am Where"	Kaitlyn Aurelia Smith	5:20
13.	"The Long Miles"	About Group	10:51
14.	"Workaround Two"	Beatrice Dillon	4:21
15.	"Worlds Within Worlds"	Hot Chip	5:38
16.	"The Bomb"	Daniel Blumberg	4:58
17.	"Ode"	Nils Frahm	4:34
18.	"None of These Things"	Hot Chip	4:04
19.	"Finnegans Wake" (excerpt)	Neil Taylor	1:51
Total length:			72:06

== Reception ==
The mix has received generally positive reviews. In a review for AllMusic, Heather Phares wrote that the mix was "by turns cosmic and cozy...a special addition to the series.
