= A Bath Full of Ecstasy =

Studio album by Hot Chip
- Released: 21 June 2019
- Studios: Sounds and Sons Studios; Livingston Studios; Konk Studios; Motorbass Studios; Hackney Road Studios; RAK Studios
- Genres: Synth-pop, alternative dance
- Length: 47:35
- Label: Domino
- Producers: Hot Chip; Philippe Zdar; Rodaidh McDonald

Hot Chip chronology
Why Make Sense? (2015)	A Bath Full of Ecstasy (2019)	Late Night Tales: Hot Chip (2020)

Singles from A Bath Full of Ecstasy
- 1. "Hungry Child" Released: 4 April 2019; 2. "Melody of Love" Released: 29 May 2019

A Bath Full of Ecstasy is the seventh studio album by English synth-pop group Hot Chip. It was released on 21 June 2019 and was co-produced by Hot Chip, Philippe Zdar, and Rodaidh McDonald, marking the first time the group worked with outside producers. The album was preceded by the singles "Hungry Child" and "Melody of Love".

It is one of the final albums released with production credits from Zdar – alongside his band Cassius' final studio album Dreems, released on the same day – as he died two days before its release, on 19 June.

== Writing and recording ==
Preliminary songwriting for A Bath Full of Ecstasy was undertaken by Hot Chip members Alexis Taylor and Joe Goddard, and first traces back to work they did for pop singer Katy Perry. After she asked them to help with songwriting for her 2017 album Witness, the duo spent four days at Air Studios collaborating with her. Goddard called it "incredibly exciting" and said: "I loved writing for somebody else. She was great, very funny and easygoing". One of the songs they wrote, "Into Me You See", ended up on her album, while two others, "Spell" and "Echo", were re-worked by Hot Chip for A Bath Full of Ecstasy. Felix Martin said, "We ended up with the leftover bits they'd written, being very much obvious pop stuff, and those songs ended up being something more interesting than that." Taylor and Goddard also recorded demos at Goddard's studio in East London.

When the members of Hot Chip re-convened to record A Bath Full of Ecstasy, they decided to work with outside producers for the first time and to allow them to have a say in the songwriting. The decision was born out of the band's desire to take a different approach than they had on previous records, and to have someone push them creatively. Martin said, "We all recognize you need to set new challenges and put yourself in slightly different positions in order to provoke a different response artistically." Goddard said that the group also wanted someone who would present additional choices of equipment for them to use beyond what they already owned. After meeting with several producers, the band chose to work with Philippe Zdar of French musical duo Cassius, as well as Rodaidh McDonald.

Initially, collaborating with outsiders caused some friction. Whereas Taylor and Goddard were open to McDonald challenging them to write better songs, band member Al Doyle had some difficulty trusting "the people [they] were working with were making better decisions than [they] would make as a band". Doyle said he needed to acclimate himself to McDonald's style, as the producer worked entirely on a computer, whereas Doyle was "more traditional and old-fashioned". Though Taylor was eager to follow the producers' direction, he said that in a few instances, he decided to follow his instincts and disregard their suggestions.

The two producers had very different styles. McDonald, who Martin described as "mild-mannered", "analytical", and "goal-oriented", brought a pop-centric mindset and deliberated about the song structures. He recommended to the group where to add bridges, choruses, and hooks, how many bars they should last, and he considered how the songs should be edited differently for radio or streaming services. Goddard said of McDonald, "He was quite ruthless – 'is this verse too long? Do we have to write something stronger? We should get to the chorus faster.' He pushed us to be more ambitious." Martin said the producer was very honest and never afraid to suggest changes if he thought the songs could be improved, which included urging lyrical rewrites. He described McDonald as having an editor's mindset, in that "he would always look to make songs work better in a shorter, more punchy way." Goddard said he was "really amazing at structuring the songs, so that it's very not overstaying its welcome". The band worked with McDonald in London.

Zdar, on the other hand, was more interested in fostering a collaborative atmosphere in the studio amongst the band members and capturing the moments of "fun improvisation". Contrasting with his counterpart, Zdar believed in long edits of tracks instead of making short pop songs. Taylor said Zdar had a knack for spotting the vocal melodies and hooks in songs, and his mixes emphasised them while also giving "more space in the music". Taylor also enjoyed the unfamiliar equipment and instruments that Zdar offered the group, helping them deviate from familiar habits. Goddard called him "bold and passionate" and praised his skills at "working with bass, making records feel really full and alive". He said the producer's "sense of joy and wonder at the world" helped instill the group with more confidence. They worked with Zdar at his studio, Motorbass Studios, in Montmartre, Paris.

Goddard credited the band members' musical pursuits outside of Hot Chip with improving them as a band, saying that they honed their skills "either as a musician or a producer, an arranger or a live player". He cited Doyle as an example, saying he had strengthened his guitar and bass guitar playing due to his experience performing with LCD Soundsystem on tour.

Approximately 20 songs were in consideration to be included on the album. Martin said that if decision of the track listing has been left entirely to the band members, the album would have comprised 10–12 songs, but they received advice from the record label and producers to keep it more concise.

== Release and promotion ==
The band announced the album on 4 April 2019, publishing the artwork, track listing, and release date, as well as concert tour dates. The news was accompanied by the release of the record's lead single, "Hungry Child", and its music video. A second single, "Melody of Love", was released on 29 May 2019, along with a music video.

A Bath Full of Ecstasy was released on 21 June 2019 in several formats. A standard edition of the record was released on vinyl, CD, and in digital formats. A deluxe edition was released on two vinyl records, with a pressing on transparent orange and turquoise discs, a black and white sleeve, and autographs of the band members.

The album artwork was designed by Jeremy Deller and graphic designer Fraser Muggeridge.

== Reception ==
Professional ratings
Aggregate scores
Source	Rating
Metacritic	83/100
Review scores
Source	Rating
AllMusic	3.5/5 stars
Exclaim!	8/10
The Independent	5/5 stars
Mojo	4/5 stars
NME	4/5 stars
The Observer	5/5 stars
Pitchfork	7.3/10
Rolling Stone	4/5 stars
The Times	5/5 stars
Uncut	7/10

Will Hodgkinson of The Times called A Bath Full of Ecstasy "as warm and appealing as its title suggests". He said the album would be merely escapist if "not for the melancholic undertow of the melodies and the empathy of the lyrics, making this beautiful album a summer soundtrack with depth". Roisin O'Connor of The Independent called the album Hot Chip's best, saying they "offer up some of their most poignant phrases to date". The review concluded, "For all its glimmering synths and the robotic pathos of Taylor's idiosyncratic vocals, this is a record with both heart and soul." Damien Morris of The Observer said the album saw "the band's gift for melody and grasp of pop's dynamics tweaked into transcendent shapes" by Zdar and McDonald. He opined that the group sound their best when delving into "the comforting predictability of that pulsing beat" of house music. Pitchfork's Jonah Bromwich said, "it's compulsively listenable, oddly moving, and stranger than it first appears, as the band gets existential on the dance floor." He thought the album was most effective when the producers pushed the group beyond their comfort zone, and despite some "truly dopey lyrics", he praised the reassuring nature of the music, writing, "It's music that creates a soothing bubble, not to seal off the outside world but to create space to breathe within it."

Joe Levy of Rolling Stone praised the group for making music that is simultaneously philosophical and hedonistic. He called the sound of the record: "calibrated normality giving way to all sorts of experiments and revelations. It's clunky and smooth, a clip clop symphony of simplicity done up with complicated touches — both sonic and emotional — underneath." NME's Elizabeth Aubrey called the album "their boldest offering in years" and "a celebration of life in full technicolour". She praised the group for making dance music as an act of defiance, writing, "Amidst all the experimentation and extremes of this impressive album is a message about life: bathing in the moments of ecstasy will ultimately enable us to cherish and value life more." Anna Alger of Exclaim! also praised the album for its comforting nature, saying that it "provides hope within strife, encourages repeated listens as much for their danceability as the quality of the writing." Stephen Worthy of Mojo commended Hot Chip for their choice of producers and said the band "remain ruthlessly consistent and relentlessly reliable". He called the title track "fail-safe festival material" and "Hungry Child" the group's "purest club moment yet". Uncut's Piers Martin said the band "have seldom sounded as youthful and carefree as they do" on A Bath Full of Ecstasy while complimenting Zdar and McDonald for enhancing their sound.

=== Accolades ===
Publication	Accolade	Rank	Ref.
GQ (Russia)	The 20 Best Albums of 2019	—N/a	
musicOMH	Top 50 Albums of 2019	6	
Slant Magazine	The 25 Best Albums of 2019	11	
The Independent	The 50 best albums of 2019	16	
Popmatters	The 70 Best Albums of 2019	16	
The Guardian	The 50 best albums of 2019	17	
Mojo	The 75 Best Albums of 2019	31	
Q	The 50 best albums of 2019	33	
Under the Radar	Top 100 Albums of 2019	85	
Stereogum	Best 2019 Albums So Far (Mid-Year)	50	

== Track listing ==
No.	Title	Length
1.	"Melody of Love"	4:18
2.	"Spell"	6:18
3.	"Bath Full of Ecstasy"	4:00
4.	"Echo"	4:40
5.	"Hungry Child"	6:05
6.	"Positive"	5:37
7.	"Why Does My Mind"	4:14
8.	"Clear Blue Skies"	6:45
9.	"No God"	5:38
Total length:		47:35

Japan bonus tracks
No.	Title	Length
10.	"None of These Things"	4:05
11.	"Spell" (Superorganism Remix)

== Charts ==
Chart performance for A Bath Full of Ecstasy
Chart (2019)	Peak position
Australian Albums (ARIA)	59
Belgian Albums (Ultratop Flanders)	105
Belgian Albums (Ultratop Wallonia)	179
French Albums (SNEP)	142
German Albums (Offizielle Top 100)	52
Irish Albums (IRMA)	61
Portuguese Albums (AFP)	38
Scottish Albums (Official Charts)	9
Spanish Albums (Promusicae)	67
Swiss Albums (Schweizer Hitparade)	48
UK Albums (Official Charts)	11
US Independent Albums (Billboard)	13
US Top Album Sales (Billboard)	47
US Top Current Album Sales (Billboard)	40
US Top Dance Albums (Billboard)	12
