= Colours (Hot Chip song) =

Single by Hot Chip

from the album The Warning
- B-side: "Music from Electric and Musical Industries"; "Take a Gamble"; "Gang Can Dance"; "Disguise"
- Released: 14 August 2006
- Genre: Synth-pop
- Length: 5:28
- Label: EMI
- Songwriters: Alexis Taylor, Joe Goddard
- Producer: Hot Chip

Hot Chip singles chronology
"Boy from School" (2006)	"Colours" (2006)	"Shake a Fist" (2007)

"Colours" is the third single released by English synth-pop band Hot Chip from their second studio album The Warning (2006). It was released on 14 August 2006, shortly after The Warning was nominated for the 2006 Mercury Prize. The single did not chart due to the inclusion of non-promotional stickers with each format. A CGI music video was released for the song, and was directed by Nima Nourizadeh, in his third video with the band.

== Critical reception ==
The critical reception to the song was mixed. MusicOMH described "Colours" as "one of the album's woozier numbers" and stated it had "layers of smile-inducing vocal harmonies and twinkly synths". Boomkat.com stated that Hot Chip's approach to the song was similar to "Boy from School" by "tak[ing] a thudding electro heart and pump[ing] it full of indie melancholy", while Contactmusic.com said "Colours" "transcends its initial child-like innocence to seem both gorgeous and, somehow, profound." The group chorus harmony was compared to Brian Wilson, while the drum rhythms were said to "sit between Stereolab and The Beta Band".

However, Clickmusic.com said it was one of the "weakest tracks" from The Warning and said it was "bland and reptitive [sic]". The melody was described as being "as lightweight as Victoria Beckham and less memorable than many of her singles."

Inthemix.com.au discussed the remix EP. It was said that the Booka Shade remix "tak[es] '(Just Like We) Breakdown' out on a glittering tech-house trajectory that's littered with digitally processed and stuttered vocal noise and dark New Wave atmosphere". Erol Alkan's remix of "Boy from School" was described as "ten brilliant minutes of dark shuffling house, delayed-out cymbal sweeps ushering in delicately-chiming xylophone tones", while Maurice Fulton's remix of "Over and Over" was said to be "disco-funk", having "a tight backdrop of slap bass and razor-sharp snares beneath shimmering organ beds while cutting fragments of the original vocal in and out of the mix".

Although many of the remixes were praised, it was said by Clickmusic.com that the DFA remix of "Colours" "failed to match the brilliance of their version of the band's 'Just Like We (Breakdown)'" with Inthemix.com stating it represented "perhaps the only slight miss-step" on the Australian EP and described it as having "kitschy retro synth stabs and lifeless prog-Krautrock rhythms only starting to really rear into Italo-house tinged life near the very end".

Boomkat.com commented on "Gang Can Dance", with the view that it was "a trickletronica tune that could easily have been a single in its own right".

== Formats and track listing ==
UK CD single

1. "Colours" – 5:32
2. "Disguise" – 4:17
3. "Colours (Fred Falke remix)" – 6:36

UK 7" 1

1. "Colours"
2. "Gang Can Dance" - 3:50

UK 7" 2

1. "Colours (Xfm Version)"
2. "Careful (Careful Version)"

UK 12"

1. "Colours"
2. "Music From Electric And Musical Industries"
3. "Colours (DFA Remix)"
4. "Take A Gamble?" - 2:08

Australian remix EP (Released 2007)

1. "Colours" – 5:32
2. "Colours (DFA remix) – 7:38
3. "Boy from School (Erol Alkan’s Extended Re-Work)" – 10:18
4. "Over And Over (Maurice Fulton dub)" – 6:13
5. "(Just Like We) Breakdown (Booka Shade vocal mix)" – 7:17

== Personnel ==
- Erol Alkan – re-mixing
- Hot Chip – mixing
- Dick Beetham – editing
- Eric Broucek – engineer
- DFA Records – re-mixing
- Tom Elmhirst – mixing
- Fred Falke – re-mixing
- Maurice Fulton – re-mixing
- Matt Paul – engineer (assistant)
- Booka Shade – re-mixing
- Richard Wilkinson – engineer
