= Why Make Sense? =

- Digital release cover art

Studio album by Hot Chip
- Released: 18 May 2015
- Recorded: 2014
- Studios: Club Ralph, London; Angelic, Northamptonshire
- Genres: Synth-pop; indietronica; house; alternative dance; R&B
- Length: 44:50
- Label: Domino
- Producers: Hot Chip; Mark Ralph

Hot Chip chronology
In Our Heads (2012)	Why Make Sense? (2015)	A Bath Full of Ecstasy (2019)

Singles from Why Make Sense?
- 1. "Huarache Lights" Released: 10 February 2015; 2. "Need You Now" Released: 1 April 2015; 3. "Started Right" Released: 27 August 2015

Why Make Sense? is the sixth studio album by English synth-pop band Hot Chip. It was released in the United Kingdom on 18 May 2015 via Domino and was co-produced by the band and English record producer Mark Ralph. Similar to their previous album, In Our Heads (2012), it was recorded at Ralph's London studio, Club Ralph, but also at Angelic Studios in Northamptonshire. For vinyl and compact disc copies of Why Make Sense?, the album's cover art has 130,000 variations of its design, which comprises a set of parallel lines intersecting with each other (known as a moiré pattern) in front of a coloured background. Three official singles were released from the album: "Huarache Lights", "Need You Now", and "Started Right".

== Recording ==
Band member Al Doyle explained in an interview that they considered releasing a double album, but held back so as not to be "indulgent". Joe Goddard added that most of the album's songs were written in three to four days, explaining that the band "try to work really quickly so we don't work the life and soul out of it."

In a press release for the album, Goddard stated: "When we were recording, we were getting closer and closer to the sound we make on stage. That kind of freedom makes a massive difference to a few of the tracks on the album; to how the tracks grow." He also said that "musically we all had a desire to strip things right down, not overload it with parts. It relates back to the idea of actually being a band – maybe just one guitar part and one live drum part rather than multiple layers added. Musically, it was an effort to bring a real directness to our music, the kind you'd get on old RnB records."

== Release ==
The album's title, cover artwork, and track listing were announced on 10 February 2015, alongside the release of the album's first single, "Huarache Lights".

The album's second single, "Need You Now", was released on 1 April 2015 along with a music video uploaded to the band's YouTube channel on the same day. The song also samples vocals from the song "I Need You Now" by Sinnamon.

=== Album artwork ===
The album artwork for the CD and vinyl release uses a novel printing process designed by Nick Relph and Matthew Cooper. The sleeve varies from each individual print to one of 501 different colours. The artwork also includes a series of parallel lines, which are placed at differing angles on each individual print. Combined, there are over 130,000 variations for the sleeve. The artwork features a moiré pattern that was inspired by the work of Bridget Riley.

== Critical reception ==
Professional ratings
Aggregate scores
Source	Rating
Metacritic	81/100
Review scores
Source	Rating
AllMusic	4/5 stars
Consequence of Sound	B
Exclaim!	8/10
The Guardian	4/5 stars
musicOMH	4/5 stars
NME	8/10
NOW	4/5 Ns
Pitchfork	7.3/10
Q	4/5 stars
Uncut	4/5 stars

Why Make Sense? received positive reviews from critics. According to review aggregator website Metacritic, the album has received an average critic score of 81/100 based on 31 reviews, indicating "universal acclaim". Heather Phares writes on AllMusic that "It's interesting to note that Hot Chip's string of great albums—beginning with Made in the Dark—coincided with their exploration of the joys of long-term relationships. Celebrating monogamy while avoiding monotony applies to how they make music as well: On the surface, Why Make Sense? is another album of wry, kinetic electro-pop from a group that has mastered the style, but it also builds on Hot Chip's roots—and dance music's origins—in ways that sound fresh." Matthew Horton of NME gave the album a score of 8/10, calling it "a record that mostly finds Hot Chip carefree, revelling in the absence of layers of electronic adornment. Stripped back to basics and muttering against the machines, they've never come on so strong." At Paste, Ryan Reed gave the album a rating of 8.5/10 and wrote that the album "revolves around Taylor and Goddard’s usual themes of romantic devotion and friendship. But here, those words are often tinted with modern dread, like the world-weary meditations of the brooding 'Need You Now' ('Caught up in this world / I never dreamed I could belong to a state that don’t see right from wrong') and the title-track’s kraut-punk throb. 'Why make sense when the world around us refuses?' Taylor asks over clattering synths and drums. The universe may be illogical, but Hot Chip has never sounded more purposeful."

== Track listing ==
No.	Title	Length
1.	"Huarache Lights"	5:29
2.	"Love Is the Future" (featuring Posdnuos of De La Soul)	4:31
3.	"Cry for You"	4:18
4.	"Started Right"	3:44
5.	"White Wine and Fried Chicken"	3:00
6.	"Dark Night"	5:27
7.	"Easy to Get"	5:10
8.	"Need You Now"	4:45
9.	"So Much Further to Go"	3:12
10.	"Why Make Sense?"	5:14
Total length:		44:50

=== Separate EP ===
The deluxe edition of the album includes an EP titled Separate, containing four additional new songs.

No.	Title	Length
1.	"Burning Up"	4:10
2.	"Separate"	4:24
3.	"Move with Me"	3:48
4.	"Re-Harmonize"	6:24
Total length:		18:46

== Charts ==
Chart performance for Why Make Sense?
Chart (2015)	Peak position
Australian Albums (ARIA)	29
Austrian Albums (Ö3 Austria)	72
Belgian Albums (Ultratop Flanders)	30
Belgian Albums (Ultratop Wallonia)	22
Dutch Albums (Album Top 100)	57
French Albums (SNEP)	85
German Albums (Offizielle Top 100)	38
Irish Albums (IRMA)	19
Irish Independent Albums (IRMA)	5
Scottish Albums (Official Charts)	13
Spanish Albums (Promusicae)	73
Swiss Albums (Schweizer Hitparade)	53
UK Albums (Official Charts)	13
UK Dance Albums (Official Charts)	2
UK Independent Albums (Official Charts)	2
US Billboard 200	103
US Independent Albums (Billboard)	15
US Top Alternative Albums (Billboard)	14
US Top Rock Albums (Billboard)	20
US Top Dance Albums (Billboard)	3
