= Over and Over (Hot Chip song) =

2006 single by Hot Chip

Single by Hot Chip

from the album The Warning
- B-side: "A Family in Here"; "The Girl in Me"; "Grubbs"; "Sexual Healing"; "Plastic"
- Released: 27 February 2006
- Genre: Electropop
- Length: 5:47
- Label: EMI
- Songwriters: Alexis Taylor; Joe Goddard; Felix Martin
- Producer: Hot Chip

Hot Chip singles chronology
"Playboy" (2004)	"Over and Over" (2006)	"Boy from School" (2006)

"Over and Over" is the first single from English synth-pop band Hot Chip's second studio album, The Warning. It was released twice in the UK in 2006 – first reaching number 32 in March and peaking at number 27 in October.

== Music video ==
The music video, directed by Nima Nourizadeh, features the band members in what appears to be a heavily special effects-laden production, effects which are rarely seen in the video, instead having the band members performing in a stylized green screen stage, with several bored-looking assistants in green bodysuits holding props (at one point, in an attempt to recreate a bicycle ride, moving trees around to create an illusion of movement). The video was preloaded on all first generation Zune 30 devices.

== Artwork ==
The cover art, designed by Wallzo and Owen Clarke, uses the same pattern present in many of the other releases from The Warning.

== Release and reception ==
The track first appeared in December 2004 on a studio mix by Radio Soulwax. The mix was broadcast in Australia, the UK (as the Essential Mix on BBC Radio 1), and in Belgium (as Hang The Year 2004 on Studio Brussel). The US release of "Over and Over" occurred on 29 November 2005 on DFA/Astralwerks. The B side, "Just Like We (Breakdown) [DFA Remix]", did not chart. EMI Records first released the song in the UK on 27 February 2006 and re-released it on 9 October 2006. In Australia, the single was issued on 3 April 2006.

=== Critical reception ===
NME described "Over and Over" as being an "insanely catchy kitchen-sink club-stomper". The lyrics "Laid-back? We'll give you laid-back" were described as a "thinly-veiled raised middle finger to detractors who considered them 'too chilled'". NME also described it as "a rhapsodic, DFA-sized slice of smart pop." Allmusic said that "Over and Over"'s "pulsing groove [is] suggestive of old stuff (Liquid Liquid) and new (the Rapture, WhoMadeWho)".

The single was rated as the single of the year in 2006 by UK music magazine NME. In response to this, Alexis Taylor stated that he was proud and that it was "a very nice thing to happen after a year of working on [the] record, promoting it and playing it". In 2009, Pitchfork Media ranked the track at number 45 on their decade-end list. In 2011, NME placed it at number 7 on its list "150 Best Tracks of the Past 15 Years".

== Track listings ==
=== First release ===
CD

1. "Over and Over"
2. "A Family in Here"
3. "Over and Over" (Justus Köhncke's Baking Horse Club Mix)
4. "Over and Over" (video)

7-inch

1. "Over and Over"
2. "The Girl In Me"

=== Second release ===
CD1

1. "Over and Over"
2. "Grubbs"

CD2

1. "Over and Over"
2. "Sexual Healing"
3. "Over and Over" [Mock & Toof Dub]

12-inch

1. "Over and Over" [Maurice Fulton Dub]
2. "Over and Over" [Mock & Toof Dub]
3. "Just Like We (Breakdown)" [Booka Shade Vocal Mix]
4. "Just Like We (Breakdown)" [Booka Shade Dub Mix]

7-inch

1. "Over and Over" [Maida Vale Session Version]
2. "Sexual Healing"

== Charts ==
Chart (2006)	Peak position
Australia Hitseekers (ARIA)	7
Australian Dance (ARIA)	17
Scotland Singles (OCC)	21
UK Singles (OCC)	27
UK Dance (OCC)	3
