= In Our Heads =

Studio album by Hot Chip
- Released: 6 June 2012
- Recorded: September 2011 – January 2012
- Studios: Club Ralph, London
- Genres: Synth-pop; alternative dance; indietronica; electro-funk; nu-disco
- Length: 56:54
- Label: Domino
- Producer: Hot Chip

Hot Chip chronology
| One Life Stand (2010) | In Our Heads (2012) | Why Make Sense? (2015) |

Singles from In Our Heads
- 1. "Night & Day" Released: 4 June 2012; 2. "How Do You Do?" Released: 10 September 2012; 3. "Don't Deny Your Heart" Released: 26 November 2012

In Our Heads is the fifth studio album by English synth-pop band Hot Chip, released on 6 June 2012. It is the band's first album to be released by Domino. It was recorded in a span of five months at English producer Mark Ralph's Club Ralph studio in London. The promotional single "Flutes", for which a video debuted on 15 March 2012, was made available as a free download when pre-ordering the album through Domino. A limited-edition 12-inch vinyl of the song was eventually released on 2 April 2012.

"Night & Day" was released as the album's lead single on 4 June 2012. Prior to that, the Daphni mix of the song was released as a limited-edition 12-inch vinyl on Record Store Day on 21 April 2012. "How Do You Do?" and "Don't Deny Your Heart" were released as the album's second and third singles on 10 September and 26 November 2012, respectively.

== Critical reception ==
Professional ratings
Aggregate scores
| Source | Rating |
|---|---|
| AnyDecentMusic? | 7.5/10 |
| Metacritic | 79/100 |
Review scores
| Source | Rating |
| AllMusic | 4.5/5 stars |
| The A.V. Club | B− |
| The Guardian | 4/5 stars |
| The Independent | 4/5 stars |
| Mojo | 4/5 stars |
| NME | 6/10 |
| Pitchfork | 8.0/10 |
| Q | 4/5 stars |
| Rolling Stone | 3.5/5 stars |
| Spin | 8/10 |

In Our Heads received generally positive reviews from music critics. At Metacritic, which assigns a normalised rating out of 100 to reviews from mainstream publications, the album received an average score of 79, based on 40 reviews. Heather Phares of AllMusic viewed In Our Heads as one of Hot Chip's "most confident, joyous, and danceable albums yet", as well as the band's "most direct album yet, delivering their quirks and grooves with bigger, broader strokes that don't feel dumbed down". The Guardian journalist Alexis Petridis opined, "No matter where the music on In Our Heads ventures [...] it never feels forced. There's a similar subtlety in the songwriting, which is deeply idiosyncratic without smashing you over the head with its quirkiness." Sean Thomas of Drowned in Sound stated that In Our Heads is "arguably [the band's] consistent record to date", adding that "[t]he over riding result is that Hot Chip now seem infinitely more comfortable and competent in their skins." In a review for PopMatters, Brice Ezell commented that the album "could be the best thing we've heard from [Hot Chip]", concluding that "In Our Heads is proof that Hot Chip are succeeding on their consistently impressive musical journey, and as far as I can see there's still much to be learned from these songwriters."

Larry Fitzmaurice of Pitchfork described In Our Heads as Hot Chip's "most playful and colorful record yet, an album-length manifestation of that 'sounds of the studio' game that cut straight through the middle of 'Shake a Fist'." He continued, "The songwriting is as strong and intricate than on 2006's classic The Warning, even if it takes a few listens for the finer points to sink in." The Independent's Simon Price dubbed the album "their most emotional release yet and also their most philosophical—with the complex, seven-minute 'Flutes' and the cascading arpeggios of 'Let Me Be Him' among the finest things Hot Chip have ever achieved musically." Andy Baber of musicOMH referred to it as "the best album start-to-finish from Hot Chip, one that continues to show their deft range—from infectious disco hits to soulful ballads. It's an impressive return from the quirky five-piece, topping their nearly brilliant fourth album in both scale and ambition."

Evie Nagy of Rolling Stone wrote, "There's unguarded joy in the British quintet's mix of synthed-up grooves and pop songfulness on tracks like 'Don't Deny Your Heart'. Their communal vocals are always warm and nuanced, with leader Alexis Taylor merging Davy Jones' innocence with the mirror-ball yearning of Erasure's Andy Bell." However, Slant Magazine's Kevin Liedel felt that the album "feels like a cut-and-paste job, with whole parts either lifted from previous Hot Chip tracks [...] or blatant counterfeits of their '80s-era influences", while stating that "[t]he only reliable human standby amid the parade of dreary automation is Alexis Taylor's voice, which remains as pristine and angelic as ever". Thom Gibbs of NME expressed, "From start to finish, it has an educated and intense eye on the dancefloor, and it sounds fantastic", but concluded by saying, "Lively and upbeat, but naggingly sterile. Tasteful and perfectly executed, but workmanlike." Simon Butcher of Clash dismissed In Our Heads as "an '80s-inspired album lacking in pace", citing tracks like "Motion Sickness", "Night & Day" and "Flutes" as "glimmers of liveliness on an otherwise decedent [sic] record".

The album was also included in the book 1001 Albums You Must Hear Before You Die.

== Commercial performance ==
In Our Heads debuted at number 14 on the UK Albums Chart, selling 9,699 copies in its first week.

== Track listing ==
All tracks are written by Hot Chip.

| No. | Title | Length |
|---|---|---|
| 1. | "Motion Sickness" | 5:21 |
| 2. | "How Do You Do?" | 4:45 |
| 3. | "Don't Deny Your Heart" | 4:31 |
| 4. | "Look at Where We Are" | 3:59 |
| 5. | "These Chains" | 4:16 |
| 6. | "Night & Day" | 4:31 |
| 7. | "Flutes" | 7:05 |
| 8. | "Now There Is Nothing" | 4:00 |
| 9. | "Ends of the Earth" | 5:41 |
| 10. | "Let Me Be Him" | 7:41 |
| 11. | "Always Been Your Love" | 5:04 |

Japanese edition bonus tracks
| No. | Title | Length |
|---|---|---|
| 12. | "Doctor" | 4:01 |
| 13. | "Jelly Babies" | 5:23 |

Expanded edition bonus CD
| No. | Title | Length |
|---|---|---|
| 1. | "Jelly Babies" | 5:21 |
| 2. | "Doctor" | 4:01 |
| 3. | "Look at Where We Are" (Major Lazer vs. Junior Blender Digital Drums Remix) | 4:02 |
| 4. | "Night & Day" (Daphni Mix) | 7:38 |
| 5. | "Flutes" (A JD Twitch Optimo Remix) | 8:06 |
| 6. | "Night & Day" (demo) | 4:41 |
| 7. | "Now There Is Nothing" (demo) | 3:38 |
| 8. | "Babies" (demo) | 3:45 |
| 9. | "How Do You Do?" (demo) | 3:45 |
| 10. | "Flutes" (demo) | 6:32 |
| 11. | "Night & Day" (Moretime Remix) | 7:19 |
| 12. | "Let Me Be Him" (Joe's Dub) | 8:01 |
| Total length: | | 61:28 |

== Personnel ==
Credits adapted from the liner notes of In Our Heads.

- Hot Chip – mixing, performers, production
- Lizzi Bougatsos – backing vocals (track 11)
- Terry Edwards – saxophone (track 1)
- Geese – strings (tracks 8, 11)
- Edie Goddard – voice sample (track 5)
- Charles Hayward – drums (track 1)
- Adem Ilhan – guitar (track 7)
- Oliver Lowe – marimba (tracks 7, 8); vibraphone (track 11)
- Mike Marsh – mastering
- Mark Ralph – additional production, engineering (all tracks); mixing (tracks 1, 4, 5, 8, 9, 11)
- Nick Relph – design
- Sarah-Jane Skeete – backing vocals (track 6)
- Rob Smoughton – drums (tracks 4, 8); Simmons pads (track 7); guitar (track 10)
- Steel Harmony – steelpans (track 3)
- Karl Sunderland – handclaps (track 11)
- Leo Taylor – drums (tracks 2, 3, 6)
- Oliver Wright – mixing (tracks 2, 3, 6, 7, 10)

== Charts ==
=== Weekly charts ===
Weekly chart performance for In Our Heads
| Chart (2012) | Peak position |
|---|---|
| Australian Albums (ARIA) | 19 |
| Australian Dance Albums (ARIA) | 2 |
| Austrian Albums (Ö3 Austria) | 63 |
| Belgian Albums (Ultratop Flanders) | 24 |
| Belgian Albums (Ultratop Wallonia) | 54 |
| Canadian Albums (Nielsen SoundScan) | 59 |
| Danish Albums (Hitlisten) | 36 |
| Dutch Albums (Album Top 100) | 91 |
| French Albums (SNEP) | 50 |
| German Albums (Offizielle Top 100) | 43 |
| Irish Albums (IRMA) | 12 |
| Irish Independent Albums (IRMA) | 3 |
| Japanese Albums (Oricon) | 203 |
| Scottish Albums (Official Charts) | 21 |
| Spanish Albums (Promusicae) | 85 |
| Swedish Albums (Sverigetopplistan) | 39 |
| Swiss Albums (Schweizer Hitparade) | 27 |
| UK Albums (Official Charts) | 14 |
| UK Dance Albums (Official Charts) | 1 |
| UK Independent Albums (Official Charts) | 2 |
| US Billboard 200 | 62 |
| US Independent Albums (Billboard) | 13 |
| US Top Alternative Albums (Billboard) | 13 |
| US Top Dance Albums (Billboard) | 1 |
| US Top Rock Albums (Billboard) | 28 |

=== Year-end charts ===
Year-end chart performance for In Our Heads
| Chart (2012) | Position |
|---|---|
| Australian Dance Albums (ARIA) | 49 |

== Release history ==
| Region | Date | Edition | Label | Ref. |
|---|---|---|---|---|
| Japan | 6 June 2012 | Standard | Hostess | |
| Netherlands | 7 June 2012 | Standard | Domino | |
| Australia | 8 June 2012 | Standard | EMI | |
| Germany | 8 June 2012 | Standard | Domino; GoodToGo | |
| Ireland | 8 June 2012 | Standard | Domino | |
| France | 11 June 2012 | Standard | Domino | |
| United Kingdom | 11 June 2012 | Standard | Domino | |
| Italy | 12 June 2012 | Standard | Domino | |
| United States | 12 June 2012 | Standard | Domino | |
| Sweden | 13 June 2012 | Standard | Playground | |
| Poland | 26 June 2012 | Standard | EMI | |
| Netherlands | 15 November 2012 | Expanded | Domino | |
| Australia | 16 November 2012 | Expanded | EMI | |
| Germany | 16 November 2012 | Expanded | Domino; GoodToGo | |
| Sweden | 21 November 2012 | Expanded | Playground | |
| France | 26 November 2012 | Expanded | Domino | |
| United Kingdom | 26 November 2012 | Expanded | Domino | |
