= Boy from School =

2006 single by Hot Chip

Single by Hot Chip

from the album The Warning
- B-side: "The Bell Ringers"; "Laws of Salvation"; "A Glue Too Thick"; "A Bad Bad Tackle"
- Released: 8 May 2006
- Genre: Electropop
- Length: 5:20
- Label: EMI; Astralwerks
- Songwriters: Joe Goddard; Alexis Taylor
- Producer: Hot Chip

Hot Chip singles chronology
"Over and Over" (2006)	"Boy from School" (2006)	"Colours" (2006)

"Boy from School" (album version titled "And I Was a Boy from School") is a song by the British synth-pop band Hot Chip. It was released on 8 May 2006 in the UK as the second single from their second studio album, The Warning (2006). The original title of the song was shortened for the single release at the request of EMI. The song was covered by Portastatic in 2006, Maritime in 2007, Grizzly Bear in 2010 and Tears For Fears in 2013.

== Music video ==
Two reviews made comparisons of the video to children's craft TV programme Art Attack. Boomkat.com said "for anyone who was raised on a diet of Neil Buchanan", that the video would bring back the memory of giant Art Attacks, and This Is Fake DIY said, "They've gone all Neil Buchanan on us".

When asked about the Art Attack style video by Jonson Walker of Gigwise, Alexis Taylor said, "Yeah the video was fucking expensive! We actually said that we weren't going to spend that kind of money again unless we were blowing up cars but we'll learn."

== Critical reception ==
Drowned in Sound compared "Boy from School" to "Over and Over" and said the song had retained the "incessant, thumping kick drum and the choral harmonies" but had incorporated differences. Drowned in Sound also said the "synths drop out to leave behind the introspective sighs of 'We try but we don't belong' [adding] a human touch to a genre led by the robotic likes of Daft Punk", a quality that might "prove to be Hot Chip's trump card." Virgin Media described the song as a "bittersweet electro gem" with "achingly gorgeous vocal harmonies that run throughout, occasionally blossoming into a reverb-treated chorus that feels like sinking back onto a bed of marshmallow".

Boomkat.com described the song, "Boy from School (Cosmic Sandwich Remix)", as having an increased tempo with rougher edges, that "chases out the lyrics" and described "Boy from School (Erol Alkan's Rework)", as being given "a dusting of disco powder".

NME said the song "fuses the thudding robots-take-Ibiza beat of Stardust's "Music Sounds Better with You" to the melancholy synth swoon of Aphex Twin's Selected Ambient Works Vol. 2, whilst MusicOMH said the song "fuses a similar folk lullaby approach to the disco drive of Spiller's "Groovejet" ". MusicOMH also said the song was "poptastically lovely", with male-female vocal harmonies, which were compared to Scritti Politti and Mojave 3, and said that the drums and keyboard take the song "in the direction of Giorgio Moroder and Kraftwerk."

The song was listed at number 29 on Pitchfork's top 500 songs of the 2000s.

The song plays during a montage of Bart's weekly routine at the start of The Simpsons episode "A Totally Fun Thing Bart Will Never Do Again". The song was featured in various Toonami commercials in Europe.

== Track listing ==
CD 1:

1. "Boy from School" – 5:20
2. "Boy from School" (Hot Chip Rework) – 7:10
3. "A Glue Too Thick" – 3:13
4. "Boy from School (Erol Alkan's Rework)" – 10:18
5. "The Bell Ringers" – 5:37
6. "Boy from School (Cosmic Sandwich Remix)" – 8:33

CD 2:

1. "Boy From School"
2. "Law Of Salvation"
3. "Boy From School" (Erol Alkan's Rework).
4. "Boy From School" (Video).

== Personnel ==
- Erol Alkan – reworking
- Owen Clarke – art direction, design
- Tom Elmhirst – mixing
- Bevis Martin – artwork
- Matt Paul – assistant engineer
- Richard Wilkinson – engineer

== Charts ==
Chart (2006)	Peak position
UK Singles (OCC)	40
