= Freakout/Release =

Studio album by Hot Chip
- Released: 19 August 2022
- Studios: Relax and Enjoy (London)
- Genre: Alternative dance
- Length: 47:17
- Label: Domino
- Producer: Hot Chip

Hot Chip chronology
Late Night Tales: Hot Chip (2020)	Freakout/Release (2022)	Joy in Repetition (2025)

Singles from Freakout/Release
- 1. "Down"; 2. "Eleanor"; 3. "Broken"

Freakout/Release is the eighth studio album by English synth-pop band Hot Chip. It was released on 18 August 2022 through Domino Records.

== Critical reception ==
Professional ratings
Aggregate scores
Source	Rating
Metacritic	76/100
Review scores
Source	Rating
AllMusic	4/5 stars
Clash	7/10
Exclaim!	8/10
MusicOMH	3.5/5 stars
NME	3/5 stars
The Observer	3/5 stars
Paste	7.8/10
Pitchfork	7.6/10
PopMatters	9/10
Slant Magazine	3/5 stars

According to the review aggregator Metacritic, Freakout/Release received "generally favorable reviews" based on a weighted average score of 76 out of 100 from 15 critic scores.

== Track listing ==
Freakout/Release track listing
No.	Title	Length
1.	"Down"	3:52
2.	"Eleanor"	5:09
3.	"Freakout/Release"	3:17
4.	"Broken"	3:24
5.	"Not Alone"	4:32
6.	"Hard to Be Funky" (featuring Lou Hayter)	4:11
7.	"Time"	4:35
8.	"Miss the Bliss"	4:56
9.	"The Evil That Men Do" (featuring Cadence Weapon)	5:25
10.	"Guilty"	4:02
11.	"Out of My Depth"	3:54
Total length:		47:17

== Charts ==
Chart performance for Freakout/Release
Chart (2022)	Peak position
Belgian Albums (Ultratop Flanders)	120
Belgian Albums (Ultratop Wallonia)	196
German Albums (Offizielle Top 100)	45
Scottish Albums (Official Charts)	10
Swiss Albums (Schweizer Hitparade)	99
UK Albums (Official Charts)	16
UK Dance Albums (Official Charts)	1
UK Independent Albums (Official Charts)	1
