= Coming on Strong (Hot Chip album) =

Studio album by Hot Chip
- Released: 24 May 2004
- Recorded: 2004
- Studios: The Bunker (Fulham, London)
- Genres: Electropop, indietronica, neo soul
- Length: 51:07
- Label: Moshi Moshi
- Producers: Joe Goddard, Alexis Taylor

Hot Chip chronology
Down with Prince (2003)	Coming on Strong (2004)	The Warning (2006)

Coming on Strong is the debut studio album by English synth-pop band Hot Chip. It was released in the United Kingdom on 24 May 2004 by Moshi Moshi Records and in the United States and Canada on 29 November 2005 by Astralwerks, as an extended version with three additional bonus tracks. The album was re-released by Moshi Moshi Records in the United Kingdom on 3 May 2009, as a digital download with four additional bonus tracks. In 2014, it was awarded a silver certification from the Independent Music Companies Association, which indicated sales of at least 20,000 copies throughout Europe.

== Critical reception ==
Professional ratings
Aggregate scores
Source	Rating
Metacritic	67/100
Review scores
Source	Rating
About.com	3/5 stars
AllMusic	2.5/5 stars
Chart Attack	4/5
Collective	4/5 stars
Pitchfork	8.0/10
Playlouder	3/5 stars
PopMatters	3/10
Spin	8/10
Stylus Magazine	C−
Winnipeg Sun	3/5 stars

Coming on Strong received mixed to positive reviews from music critics. At Metacritic, which assigns a normalised rating out of 100 to reviews from mainstream critics, the album received an average score of 67, based on 14 reviews, which indicates "generally favorable reviews". Sean Fennessey of Pitchfork referred to the album as "a successful but safe entrée to the British electro-soul outfit" and said that the album had "kitschy yet deeply affecting lyrics." Rob Theakston of AllMusic described the sound of the album as "quirky electro-pop", whilst Ron Hart wrote for Billboard that the "utilization of American hip-hop scenarios in the context of the English slang is exactly what makes Coming on Strong such a unique listen."

== Track listing ==
All songs written by Alexis Taylor and Joe Goddard.

No.	Title	Length
1.	"Take Care"	4:05
2.	"The Beach Party"	4:01
3.	"Keep Fallin'"	4:48
4.	"Playboy"	5:33
5.	"Crap Kraft Dinner"	6:34
6.	"Down with Prince"	3:17
7.	"Bad Luck"	4:03
8.	"You Ride, We Ride, in My Ride"	5:03
9.	"Shining Escalade"	5:11
10.	"Baby Said"	4:56
11.	"One One One"	3:34

2005 US and Canadian bonus tracks

12. "A-B-C" – 4:34
13. "Hittin' Skittles" – 4:31
14. "From Drummer to Driver" – 4:24

2009 UK Digital Download bonus tracks

12. "From Drummer to Driver" – 4:24
13. "I Don't Know the Half" – 3:04
14. "Hittin' Skittles" – 4:30
15. "The Ass Attack (Four Tet Remix)" – 3:01

== Personnel ==
- Owen Clarke – guitar, bass, additional noises, illustration
- Al Doyle – guitar, synthesizer, percussion
- Joe Goddard – vocals, synthesizer, percussion, producer, engineer
- Felix Martin – drum machine, additional noises
- Alexis Taylor – vocals, synthesizer, guitar, percussion, piano, producer, engineer
- Frank Arkwright – mastering
- Scott Bennett – kalimba (track 10)
- Emma Smith – saxophone (track 5)
- Darren Wall – design
