= DJ-Kicks: Hot Chip =

Compilation album by Hot Chip
- Released: 22 May 2007
- Genre: Electronic
- Label: Studio !K7
- Producer: Hot Chip

Hot Chip chronology
The Warning (2006)	DJ-Kicks: Hot Chip (2007)	Made in the Dark (2008)

DJ-Kicks chronology
Henrik Schwarz (2006)	DJ-Kicks: Hot Chip (2007)	Booka Shade (2007)

Professional ratings
Review scores
Source	Rating
AllMusic	3.5/5 stars
Pitchfork	(8.0/10)

DJ-Kicks: Hot Chip is a DJ mix album, mixed by Hot Chip. It was released on the Studio !K7 independent record label as part of the DJ-Kicks series on May 22, 2007. It features a new song by Hot Chip, "My Piano".

== Background ==
In an interview with Pitchfork, Alexis Taylor said that some of Hot Chip's main influences weren't represented on the album because they wanted to create an album that would be "an interesting experience for people to listen to at home" and not "Hot Chip's Biggest Influences CD". In terms of the band's song choices, Owen Clarke was the least vocal in the song selection, whilst Joe Goddard and Felix Martin "lead the proceedings". Taylor said that parts of the album included artists that all the members of Hot Chip appreciated, such as Grovesnor, Ray Charles and New Order.

Taylor felt "it would've been nice for [the song "Radio Prague"] to take up a little bit more room" as his purpose in choosing it was to "change the mood at that point in the record", but felt the song seemed "a little buried".

Before Hot Chip began work on DJ-Kicks: Hot Chip, "My Piano" was created. The lyrics of the verses are about "accepting failure when you're trying to write or create something", with piano elements inspired by Diana Ross', "My Old Piano".

== Track listing ==
1. "Nitemoves" - Grovesnor
2. "I Got a Man" - Positive K
3. "Like You" - Gramme
4. "Persuasion" - Subway
5. "B1" - Soundhack
6. "Cademar" - Tom Zé
7. "My Piano" - Hot Chip
8. "Short Road" - Wax Stag
9. "Bizarre Love Triangle [Shep Pettibone extended remix]" - New Order
10. "Jiggle It" - Young Leek
11. "In the Basement" - Etta James & Sugar Pie DeSanto
12. "On Just Foot" - Black Devil Disco Club
13. "Der Buchdrucker" - Dominik Eulberg
14. "Film 2" - Grauzone
15. "Radio Prague" - This Heat
16. "Far East" - Wookie
17. "Doppelwhipper [live]" - Gabriel Ananda
18. "You Got Good Ash" - Marek Bois
19. "Stone That the Builder Rejected" - Lanark
20. "Man's Got Me Beat" - UM
21. "Love Affair" - Noze
22. "Just Fucking [Roman Flügel's 23 Positions in a One-Night Stand remix]" - Audion
23. "Steppin' Out" - Joe Jackson
24. "Mess Around" - Ray Charles
