= The Warning (Hot Chip album) =

Studio album by Hot Chip
- Released: 22 May 2006
- Recorded: Putney, London
- Genres: Electropop; synth-pop
- Length: 52:04
- Labels: EMI, Astralwerks, DFA
- Producer: Hot Chip

Hot Chip chronology
| Coming on Strong (2004) | The Warning (2006) | DJ-Kicks: Hot Chip (2007) |

Singles from The Warning
- 1. "Over and Over" Released: 27 February 2006; 2. "Boy from School" Released: 8 May 2006; 3. "Colours" Released: 14 August 2006; 4. "Over and Over (Re-release)" Released: 9 October 2006

The Warning is the second studio album by English synth-pop band Hot Chip. The album was released in the UK on 22 May 2006 by EMI Records and in the United States on 3 June 2006 by Astralwerks. Notable tracks include the UK singles, "Over and Over" and "Boy from School", as well as "(Just Like We) Breakdown", which was featured and remixed on the DFA Records compilation album The DFA Remixes – Chapter One. The album was nominated for the 2006 Mercury Music Prize.

The Warning explores the theme of contradiction as well as "slower and darker aspects of electronic music" with the use of "strange violence" in songs. This technique is best depicted in the song, "The Warning", which uses antithesis; "soft glockenspiel notes" contrasted against "violent" lyrics. The chorus continues the idea with a "patent mismatch of violence and melancholy".

A number of reviews commented on the stylistic and lyrical changes between Hot Chip's first album Coming on Strong (2004) and The Warning. Coming on Strong was described as a "successful but safe entrée to the British electro-soul outfit" and although "graceful, delicate melodies of the debut" had been abandoned, they were replaced for "songs with more wallop". Hot Chip's music changed from the "quirky electro-pop" of Coming on Strong to create an album that was "much more focused and pop friendly", "a step away from Prince and a step towards LCD Soundsystem".

In 2026, an expanded edition of the album was released to commemorate the 20th anniversary of The Warning.

== Production ==
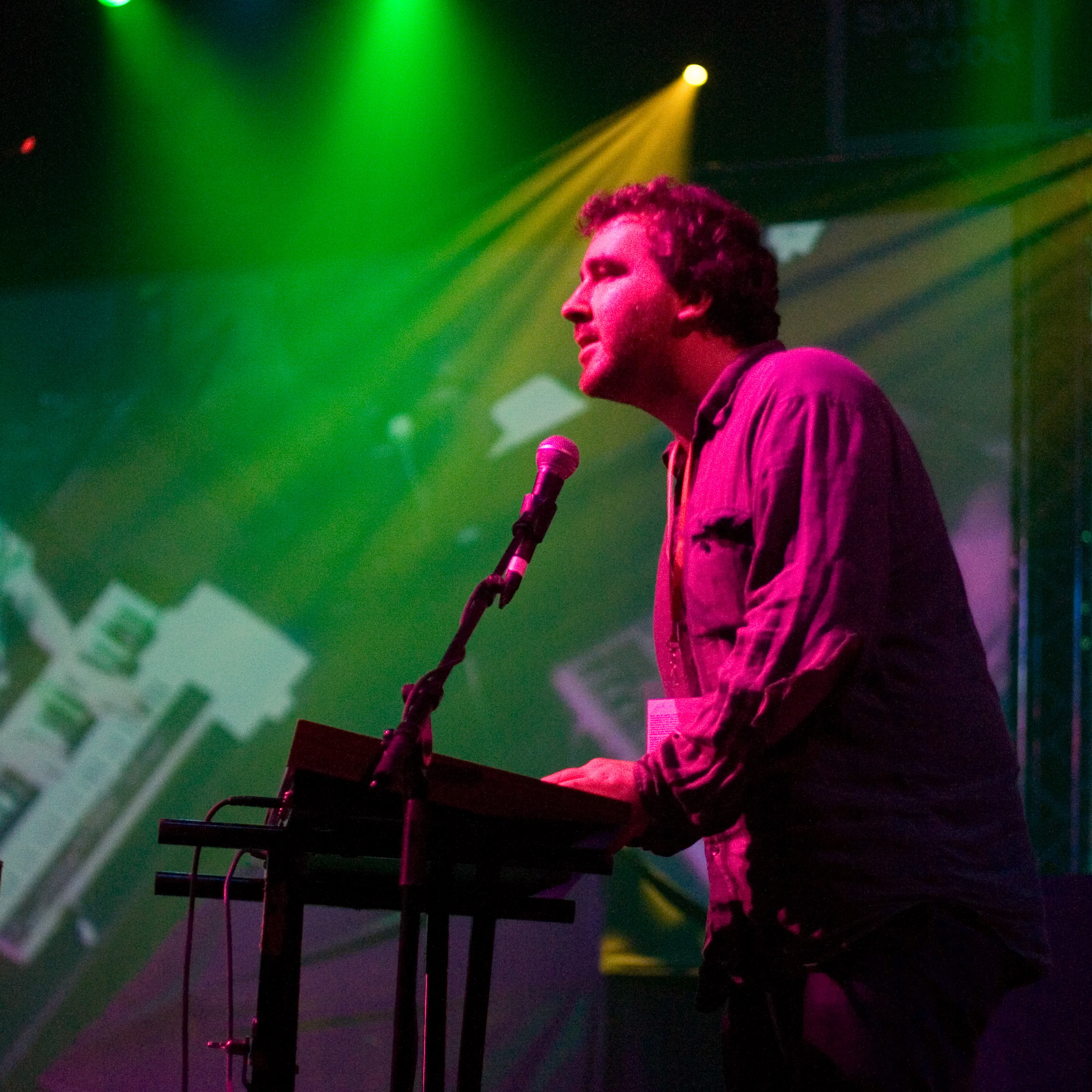
Joe Goddard

The production of The Warning was handled by vocalists Alexis Taylor and Joe Goddard, who produced and recorded the album in the band's Putney home. NME commented that the "normality of [their] surroundings" works well for them. Tim Goldsworthy and James Murphy of DFA Records were involved in the production of one song. Though the song "worked out well as a record", Taylor stated it wasn't "an enjoyable experience in terms of feeling involved". Taylor said that he and Goddard work best as a duo, the success of which he attributes to the years they have been acquainted.

An idea involving all five members joining to write songs was rejected because Taylor "didn't think it would come up with anything interesting." Although the album isn't one of all five members, Taylor and Goddard approached the album with "the spirit of the live show[s]".

In an interview with Jim Carroll from The Irish Times, Taylor stated that Hot Chip had two different strands; one consisting of Taylor and Goddard who control the recording process, and a second involving all five members of Hot Chip for playing live versions of their albums. Taylor said he believed two groups were needed to avoid delivering repetitive performances; "You can do very different things in a room playing to people than when you're in a room layering sounds and getting embedded in production trickery".

The recording of the album took place in Goddard's bedroom, where Goddard had "an old Dell desktop that [he] bought maybe four or five years ago" running Steinberg Cubase. The album was recorded mostly using live instruments, including tambourines and bongos, but multiple vintage synths were also used in the creation of The Warning such as a Roland SH-101, a Teisco 60F and a Casiotone MT-70. Goddard said the majority of the album was recorded with the Casiotone MT-70 due to its "soft, simple sound" that "fits with the sound that [they] try to create" and works well with Taylor's voice. Goddard stated a preference for using a mix of analog and computer sounds rather than a concentration of Virtual Studio Technology (VST) instruments. However, one VST instrument was used, the Arturia Moog Modular, because Goddard felt it created vintage sounds that weren't "too shiny or new-sounding".

== Musical style ==
The musical influences of Taylor and Goddard, such as R. Kelly, Wookie, krautrock, Kraftwerk, Prince and Madlib, were brought together on The Warning. Taylor stated that he wanted the variety of musical interests to sound as if they had "all been mixed together in a good way" rather than "bolted together crudely", because of his belief that music shouldn't sound like "just a load of instruments". "No Fit State" gathers large influence from "Svetlana" by the group Xex.

== Release and reception ==
According to Nielsen SoundScan data reported by Billboard, The Warning sold 49,000 copies in the United States and peaked on the UK Albums Chart at number 34 and number 13 on Billboard Top Electronic Albums.

"Boy from School" was the first single released from The Warning, peaking at position number 40 on the UK chart. The second single released, "Over and Over", entered the UK chart twice, beginning with 27 February 2006 release that reached position number 32. It re-entered the UK chart on 9 October 2006, peaking at position number 27 in the UK Singles Top 75, and reached position number 44 in the Ireland Singles Top 50.

=== Promotion ===
Hot Chip embarked upon a tour of America in March 2006 to promote The Warning. Felix Martin wasn't able to participate due to severe illness, so fellow band members "had to figure out how to do his parts whilst [doing their] own" and enlisted the help of LCD Soundsystem drummer, Pat Mahoney.

=== Critical reception ===
Professional ratings
Aggregate scores
| Source | Rating |
|---|---|
| Metacritic | 79/100 |
Review scores
| Source | Rating |
| AllMusic | 3.5/5 stars |
| Entertainment Weekly | B+ |
| The Guardian | 4/5 stars |
| The Irish Times | 4/5 stars |
| MSN Music (Consumer Guide) | A− |
| NME | 8/10 |
| Pitchfork | 8.1/10 |
| Rolling Stone | 3/5 stars |
| Spin | 4/5 stars |
| Uncut | 4/5 stars |

Critical reception to The Warning was generally favourable, with the album receiving a score of 79 out of 100 by review aggregate website Metacritic based on 27 reviews. AllMusic said that "Over and Over" had "DFA signature production" and described the chorus as sounding "hauntingly similar to something Paul McCartney would write had he been paying attention to the music of the youth in his own backyard." The production of the title track, "The Warning", was likened to outtakes by The Postal Service and it was said that it "wouldn't [sound] out of place on I Am Robot and Proud's last few records". Pitchfork described the song as one of the centrepieces on the album and that "like a lot of the band's best songs, it splits into three and four parts, veering into bridges where there should be choruses, verses where there should codas, and dirges where there should be melodies". Prefix magazine's review discussed the idea of antithesis in the song, "The Warning", which had "soft glockenspiel notes" in contrast with "violent" lyrics. "Boy from School" was described by NME as "a sweet, melodic mid-tempo dance anthem", whilst Pitchfork said the song was "marked by Alexis Taylor's sweetly thin vocals and the heartbroken line, 'We try, but we don't belong.'" "Tchaparian" and "Arrest Yourself" were named by Pitchfork as songs that were "needlessly jagged on an album full of round edges". Pitchfork also said that "momentum and retraction" of "Careful", which "opens softly and quickly erupts into choppy sample darts, then cools back down again" was "a good metaphor for the [whole] record".

Two reviewers noted similarities between Hot Chip and New Order, with NME stating, "there’s something of New Order in Hot Chip [...] [with] the same mix of art school-meets-working man demeanour", whilst AllMusic stated that The Warning was "like listening to early New Order records for the first time, waiting for the next one with a little bit of excited anticipation".

AllMusic said that "the core of what made The Warning [...] enjoyable right from the onset" was a result of Hot Chip "focusing more on song arrangements and structure rather than technology and programming showmanship". Prefix magazine said that alongside exploring the theme of contradiction, "the duo explore[d] the slower and darker aspects of electronic music" with "a number of slower, adroitly manoeuvred songs". bbc.co.uk said that Hot Chip had managed to "meld wonky electronics, pillow-soft soul and lyrics [together] to weave strange violence into gorgeous soul songs". NME described the album as being "underpinned by a 'fuck you' attitude" resulting from the audience's "past ambivalence towards them" but also said that "in channelling this anger they’ve produced the finest album of electronic rock since Mylo's Destroy Rock & Roll."

== Accolades ==
The album received a number of accolades, including a nomination for the 2006 Mercury Music Prize. Certain tracks received recognition such as "Boy from School", which was ranked at number seven on Pitchfork's list of the top 100 songs of 2006, while "Over and Over" was ranked at number 16. "Over and Over" was also named "Track of 2006" by NME. Additionally, the album was ranked number 26 on Pitchfork's list of the top 50 albums of the year and number 81 list of the top 200 albums of the decade. The Warning also placed on Slant Magazine's list of best albums of the 2000s at number 93.

== Track listing ==
| No. | Title | Length |
|---|---|---|
| 1. | "Careful" | 3:28 |
| 2. | "And I Was a Boy from School" | 5:19 |
| 3. | "Colours" | 5:28 |
| 4. | "Over and Over" | 5:50 |
| 5. | "(Just Like We) Breakdown" | 4:12 |
| 6. | "Tchaparian" | 3:20 |
| 7. | "Look After Me" | 4:50 |
| 8. | "The Warning" | 4:51 |
| 9. | "Arrest Yourself" | 2:31 |
| 10. | "So Glad to See You" | 4:05 |
| 11. | "No Fit State" | 5:38 |
| 12. | "Won't Wash" (hidden track) | 2:35 |

== Personnel ==
- Owen Clarke – artwork design, art conception, guitar, bass
- Al Doyle – guitar, synthesizer, percussion, backing vocals
- Tom Elmhirst – mixing
- Joe Goddard – vocals, synthesizer, percussion
- Felix Martin – drum machines
- Matt Paul – assistant engineer
- Alexis Taylor – vocals, synthesizer, guitar, percussion, piano
- Richard Wilkinson – engineer

== Charts ==
Chart performance for The Warning
| Chart (2006) | Peak position |
|---|---|
| Irish Albums (IRMA) | 42 |
| Scottish Albums (Official Charts) | 28 |
| Swedish Albums (Sverigetopplistan) | 38 |
| UK Albums (Official Charts) | 34 |
| UK Dance Albums (Official Charts) | 1 |
| US Top Dance Albums (Billboard) | 13 |
