= Hot Chip =

British electronic music band

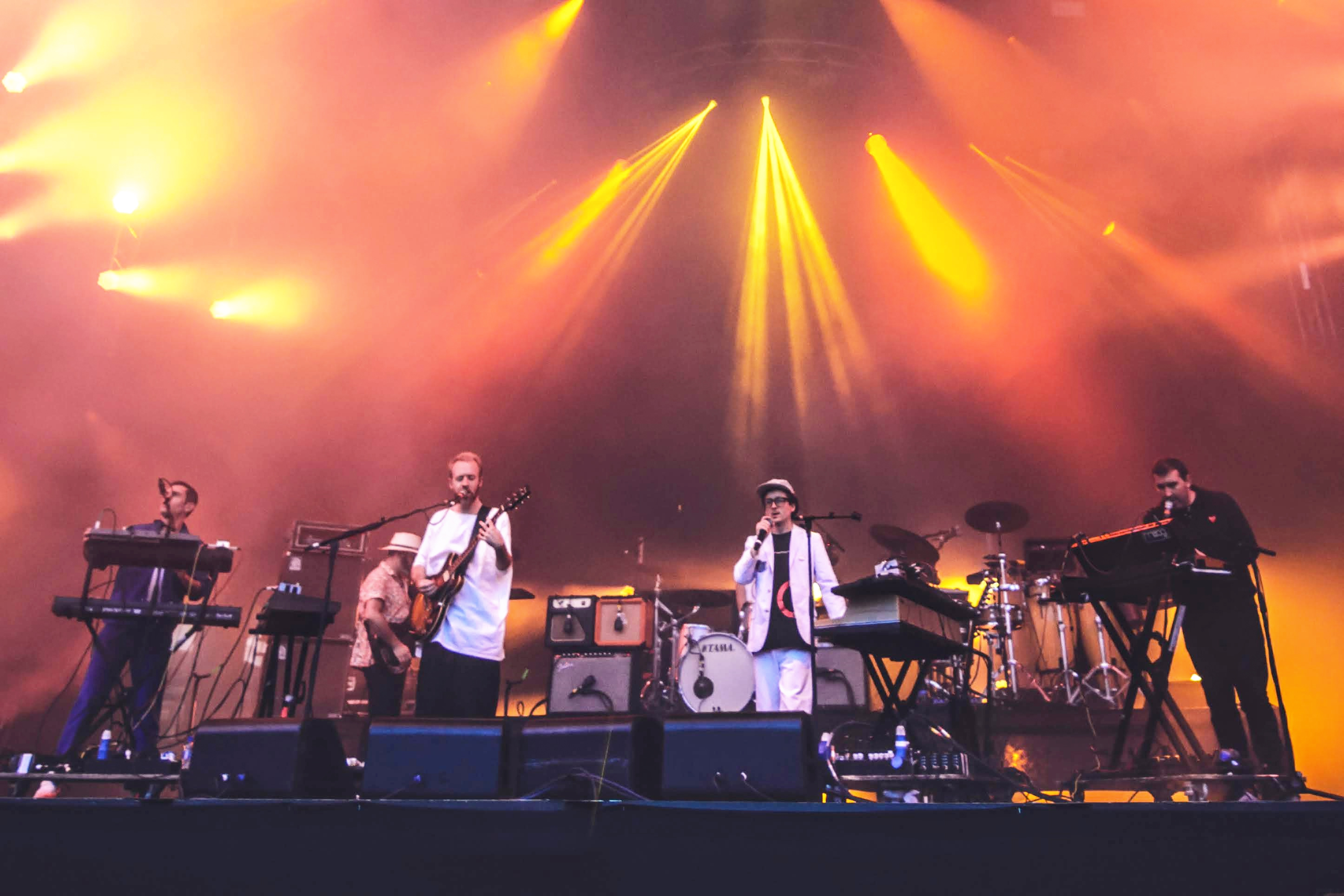
- Hot Chip performing at the Positivus Festival in 2016

Background information
- Origin: London, England
- Genres: Synth-pop; alternative dance; indietronica; house
- Years active: 2000–present
- Labels: Domino; EMI; Parlophone; DFA; Astralwerks; Moshi Moshi
- Spinoffs: New Build
- Members: Alexis Taylor; Joe Goddard; Al Doyle; Owen Clarke; Felix Martin
- Past members: Rob Smoughton
- Website: hot-chip.co.uk

Hot Chip are an English synth-pop band formed in London in 2000. The group consists of multi-instrumentalists Alexis Taylor, Joe Goddard, Al Doyle, Owen Clarke, and Felix Martin. They are occasionally joined by former member Rob Smoughton for live performances and studio recordings. The group primarily produces music in the synth-pop and alternative dance genres, drawing influences from house and disco.

Hot Chip began as a bedroom recording project for Taylor and Goddard, who met while students at Elliott School, Putney; their earliest lineup included Smoughton as their drummer. After completing two EPs, Mexico (2001) and San Frandisco (2002), the group released their debut album, Coming on Strong (2004) and added Doyle, Clarke, and Martin to their lineup. The band's second album, The Warning (2006), was nominated for the Mercury Prize. Their follow-up, Made in the Dark (2008), included the single "Ready for the Floor", which was nominated for the Grammy Award for Best Dance Recording. The band have subsequently released the albums One Life Stand (2010), In Our Heads (2012), Why Make Sense? (2015), A Bath Full of Ecstasy (2019), and Freakout/Release (2022).

Outside of Hot Chip, the band members, individually and in partnership with each other, are active in other musical acts and occasionally perform DJ sets.

== History ==
=== 2000–2005: Early releases and Coming on Strong ===
Hot Chip were formed around 2000 by the duo of Alexis Taylor and Joe Goddard, who had met as students at Elliott School, Putney. The pair attended a Royal Trux concert, which Taylor describes as the moment that "changed it all" for him. Other influences on the band included ABBA, Prince, OMD, Roxy Music, Arthur Russell and Madonna. Hot Chip initially played in a more stripped-back, acoustic style before gradually becoming more electronic over time. Early formative releases included 2001's Mexico EP on Victory Garden Records (VG14), and the self-released San Frandisco EP in 2002. After years of self-releasing records, they signed with Moshi Moshi in 2003 and released their debut LP Coming on Strong in 2004. During this period, they were joined by Owen Clarke, Felix Martin and Al Doyle. They started working on their second album and signed a UK and US record deal with EMI and DFA Records. DFA and Astralwerks released their debut album for the first time in the United States in late 2005.

=== 2005–2007: The Warning ===
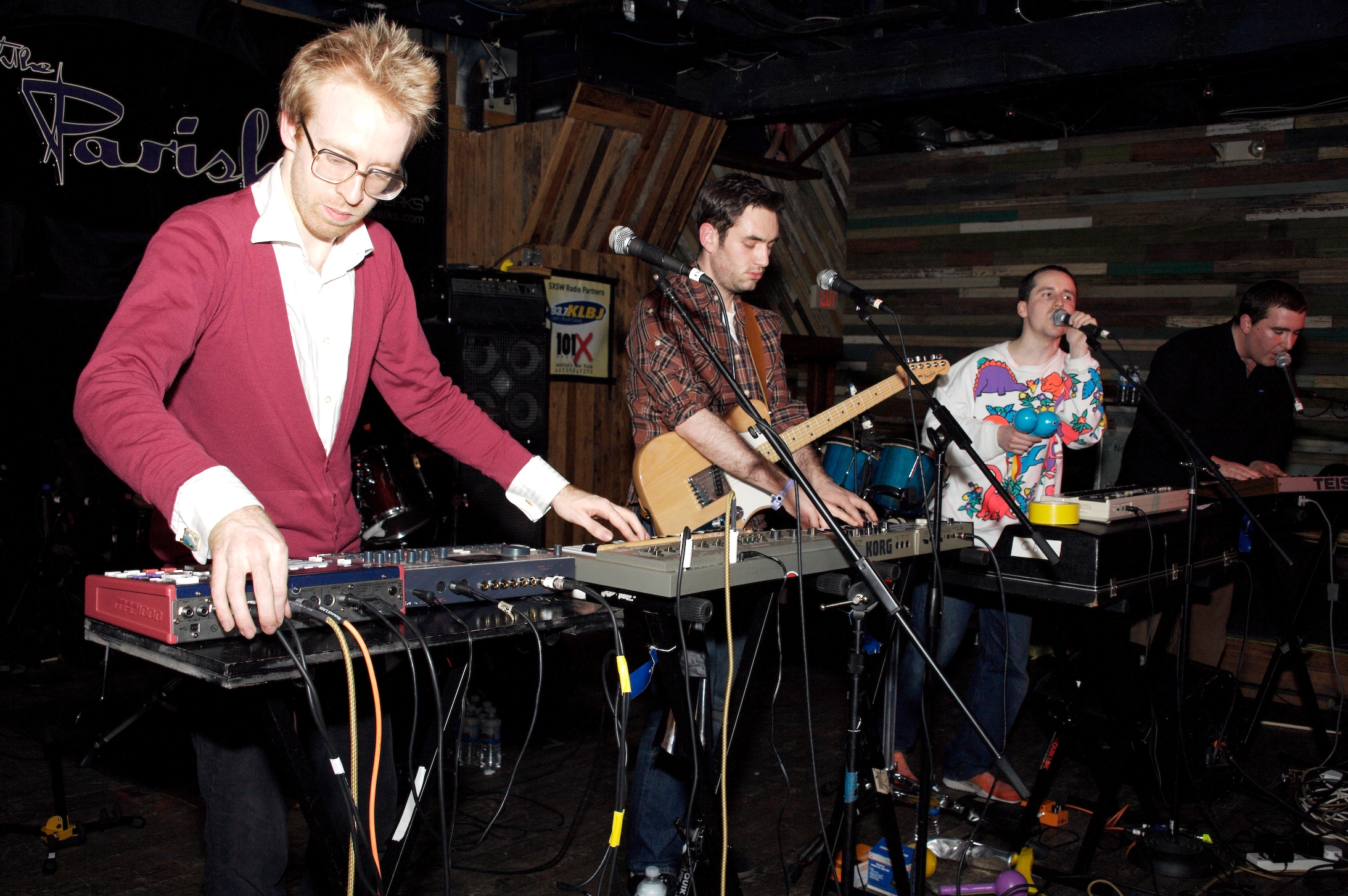
Hot Chip performing in 2006

In 2006, Hot Chip released their second album, The Warning. Now signed to EMI in the United Kingdom, the band gained more mainstream appeal as well as the attention of critics. The album was shortlisted for the 2006 Nationwide Mercury Prize and was Mixmag's Album of the Year 2006. This album spawned also two UK top 40 singles: "Over and Over" in March 2006 and "Boy from School" in May 2006. "Over and Over" received attention for its music video, which was directed by Nima Nourizadeh, and was also named as the best single of 2006 by British music magazine NME.

=== 2007–2009: Made in the Dark ===
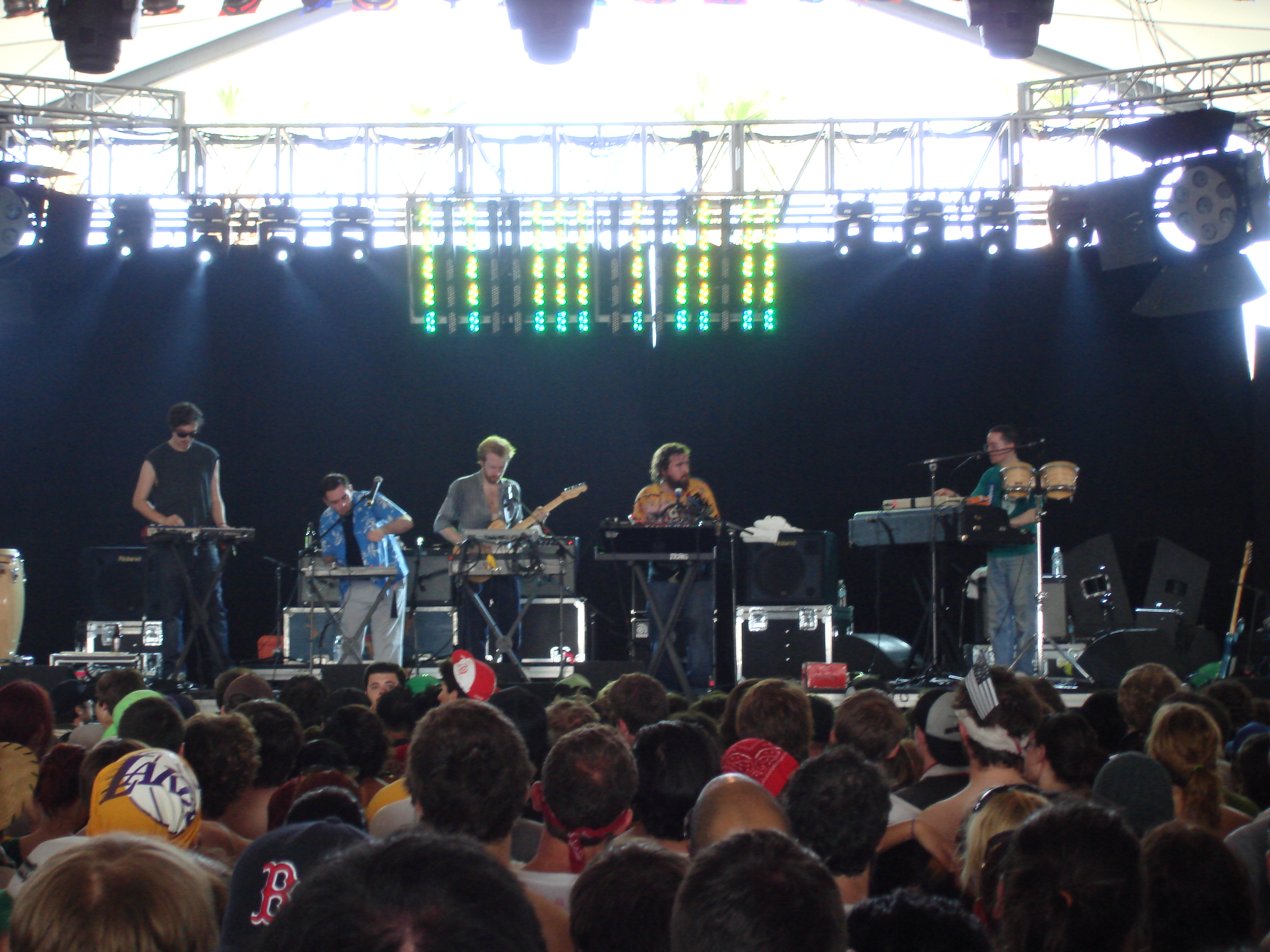
Hot Chip performing at the 2007 Coachella Valley Music and Arts Festival

The band released their third studio album, Made in the Dark, on 4 February 2008. The first song to be released from it was "Shake a Fist", which was released as a limited one-sided 12-inch vinyl in August 2007. The second release was "Ready for the Floor" in January 2008, which peaked at number six on the UK Singles Chart. In order to promote "Ready for the Floor", the band appeared on Friday Night with Jonathan Ross in January 2008, and Joe Goddard appeared on Never Mind the Buzzcocks on 31 January. In February 2008, the band performed on the American talk shows Jimmy Kimmel and Carson Daly. At the end of 2008, "Ready for the Floor" received a Grammy Award for Best Dance Recording nomination, but the song later lost out to "Harder, Better, Faster, Stronger (Alive 2007)" by Daft Punk. On 7 May 2008, the group performed their third single, "One Pure Thought", on Radio 1's Live Lounge. The hypnotic clip for "One Pure Thought" was selected as one of the best music videos of 2008 by AllMusic.

=== 2009–2010: One Life Stand ===
Having completed a world tour in February 2009, Hot Chip returned to London and began writing and recording their fourth album, One Life Stand.

In early 2009, Alexis Taylor told NME that the band recorded new songs including "Alley Cats", which the band played regularly while touring in 2008/2009. Initially, Taylor hinted that the album was going to be "a bit calmer this time" in comparison to Made in the Dark with songs that are "more mid-tempo and disco influenced", although the two tracks released prior to the album, "Take It In" and "One Life Stand", suggest that it will be more upbeat than first suggested, and may be more influenced by early house music. Alongside the regular band members, Hot Chip collaborated on several of the album tracks with the drummer Charles Hayward from This Heat and Camberwell Now, Leo Taylor, drummer from the London-based band The Invisible and the Trinidadian steel pan player Fimber Bravo.

One Life Stand was released on 1 February 2010.

=== 2011–2013: In Our Heads ===
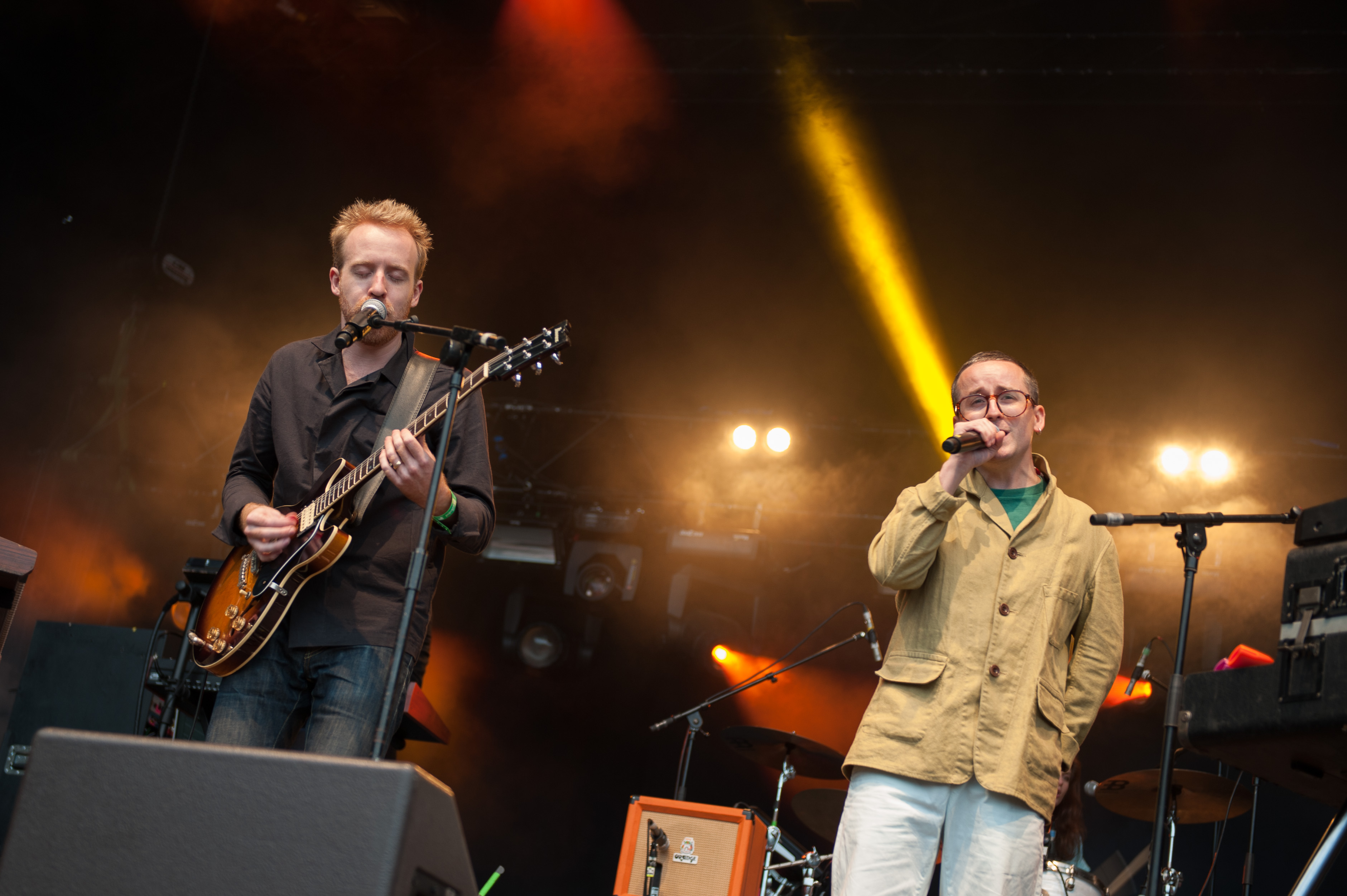
Al Doyle and Alexis Taylor at Popaganda Music Festival 2013 in Stockholm, Sweden

Their self-produced fifth studio album In Our Heads was released on 11 June 2012 by Domino.

About the album, Taylor stated, "I think In Our Heads was a bit speedier, and made with less pressure, but more fun – partly due to people in the band not having too many hang ups about how good the material was – we seemed to be happy with the songs we were writing and they came quickly – and partly due to the fact that we had been enjoying ourselves elsewhere, whether at home, or on tour, or recording with our other projects, or DJing. I think that is right about [having a] subtler confidence, but it may also be that we are a bit more accepted these days as we keep doing what we want, and gradually people stop saying 'why' to everything and each decision. The songwriting developed quickly from songs that were dreamt ('Now There is Nothing'); songs that were written via email file sending (fully fleshed out instrumentals from Joe developing into songs with added percussion/chord changes and singing by me; e.g. 'Flutes'); songs that we bashed out in collaborative writing sessions between Joe and myself ('Don't Deny Your Heart', 'How Do You Do?'); songs that one or the other of us wrote largely separately 'These Chains'– Joe/'Look at Where We Are'- Alexis); songs that a few of us in the room wrote more of: 'Dark and Stormy', or to some extent "Let Me Be Him" (at least in chorus terms); or finally songs that were written after we completed the last album and which were still in our minds: 'Always Been Your Love', 'Doctor'." "Dark and Stormy" has been since released as a non-album single.

=== 2014–2018: Why Make Sense? ===
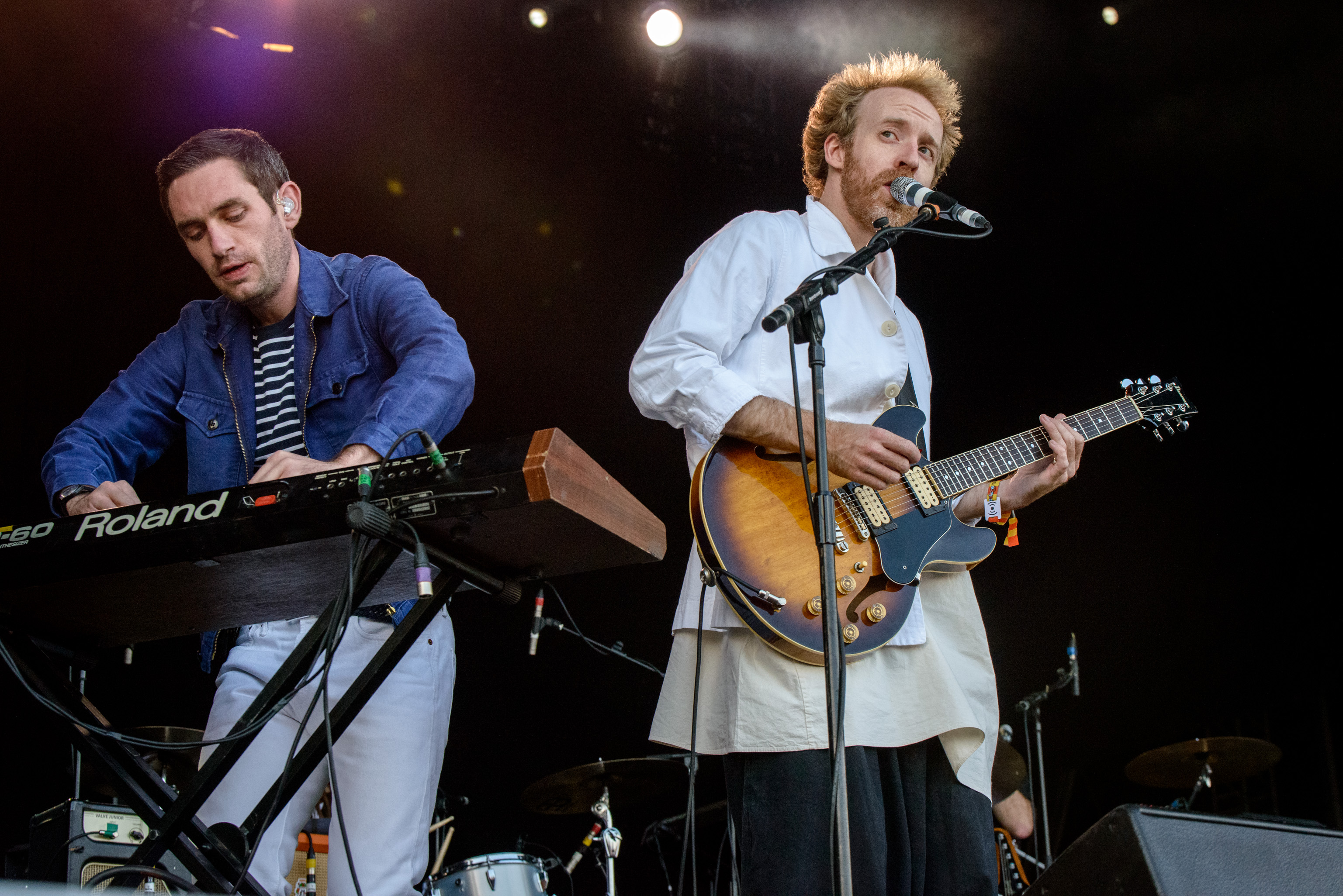
Hot Chip performing at Lollapalooza in 2015

On 10 February 2015, the band announced their sixth studio album, Why Make Sense? and released the first single, "Huarache Lights". The album was released on 18 May 2015.

=== 2019–2021: A Bath Full of Ecstasy ===
On 4 April 2019, the band announced that their seventh studio album, A Bath Full of Ecstasy, would be released on 21 June 2019. The first single from the album, "Hungry Child", was released on the same day. They released the second single, "Melody of Love", on 29 May 2019.

On 23 October 2020, the band released the single "Straight to the Morning", featuring Jarvis Cocker.

=== 2022–2025: Freakout/Release ===
It was announced on 19 April 2022 that Hot Chip would release their eighth studio album Freakout/Release on 19 August 2022, with the lead single "Down" preceding the release. The announcement coincided with Hot Chip's US, UK and European tour, which began in San Francisco on 19 April 2022. They released a second single, "Eleanor", on 7 July 2022, which is about Samuel Beckett driving André the Giant to school.

=== 2025–present: Joy in Repetition and A Long Way from Kansas ===
In July 2025, the group announced the greatest hits album Joy in Repetition and released a new song, "Devotion", which was included on the compilation. Joy in Repetition was released on 5 September 2025.

On 19 October 2026 Hot Chip announced a new studio album, A Long Way from Kansas, scheduled for release on 8 January 2027. The same day the video for the lead single, "Random Violence", directed by Jack Cole, was uploaded to YouTube. The song is a tribute to Keith McIvor (a.k.a. JD Twitch) of the DJ duo Optimo, who died in September of 2025.

== Tours and appearances ==
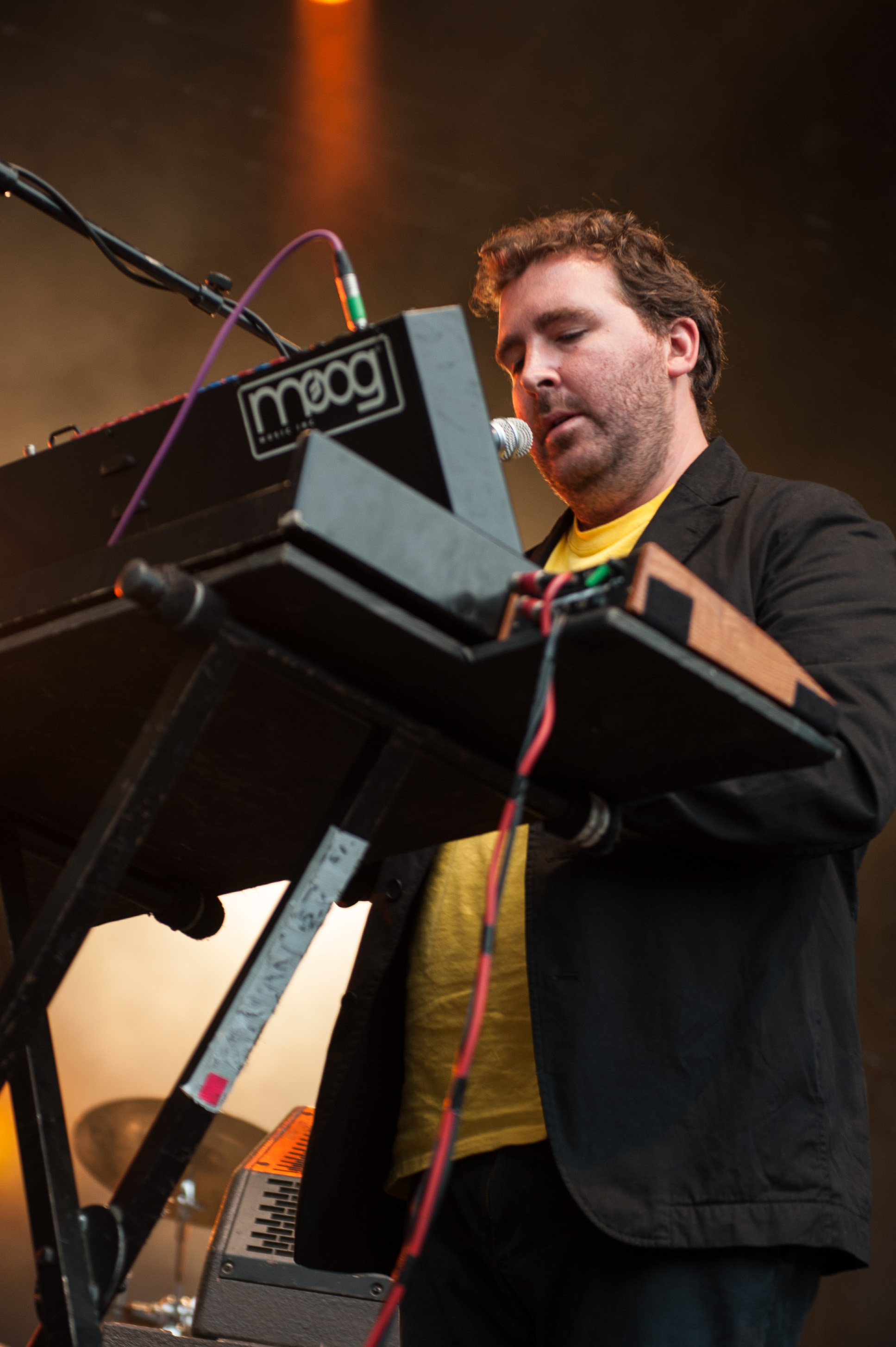
Joe Goddard at Popaganda Music Festival 2013 in Stockholm, Sweden

During live performances, Hot Chip reinvent their studio compositions to form what has been described by Glide magazine as "heavy beat-driven improvisation[s]" that create "an atmosphere of excitement, energy and the unexpected." Festival appearances include V Festival, Dour Festival, Glastonbury, Treasure Island Festival, Roskilde festival, Sónar, Benicassim, Electric Picnic, Bestival, Lovebox Festival, Bonnaroo, the Reading and Leeds Festivals, the Big Day Out, Melt! Festival, T in the Park, Summer Sundae, Splendour in the Grass, Lollapalooza and Lollapalooza Chile, the Brazilian TIM Festival, Oxegen, Coachella, Way Out West Festival, Austin City Limits, Ultra Music Festival, and the Osheaga Festival.

The band is also known for its DJ talent; they have released several mix CDs and mixes for national and international radio stations and they all DJ regularly worldwide.

Al Doyle played guitar with LCD Soundsystem on tour and was present during their concert at Madison Square Garden in 2011.

In April 2012 "Boy from School" featured in The Simpsons episode "A Totally Fun Thing That Bart Will Never Do Again".

On 29 May 2017 "Over and Over" was featured in the American Dad episode "Bazooka Steve".

Hot Chip played at Glastonbury Festival 2023 on Friday, 23 June.

In April 2026 the band makes a cameo on season 2 episode 5 of Netflix Beef.

== Other recordings ==
Hot Chip released a DJ-Kicks compilation album in 2007, and the mix album A Bugged Out Mix by Hot Chip in 2009 on the Bugged Out label.

In 2007 some official remixes were released, which they produced for Kraftwerk.

In 2008, the band released an EP which included collaborations with Robert Wyatt. Wyatt sang and reworked versions of three tracks from Made in the Dark, and the Hot Chip with Robert Wyatt and Geese EP also included a remix by Geese, a string quartet based in London who have regularly contributed to Hot Chip's recordings.

Alexis Taylor released a solo album in 2008, Rubbed Out, which saw him focusing more on the fundamental sounds used by Hot Chip. This led to a more downtempo and bluesy album than his works with Hot Chip.

Joe Goddard has also released solo productions including "Bassline '12" and "Gabriel", the latter of which was featured in the 2013 video game Grand Theft Auto V. He has also remixed songs from other artists including Disclosure, Breach, Dirty Projectors, Nneka, and Kanye West.

The band covered the William Onyeabor song "Atomic Bomb" for the Luaka Bop compilation What?! in 2014.

== Band members ==
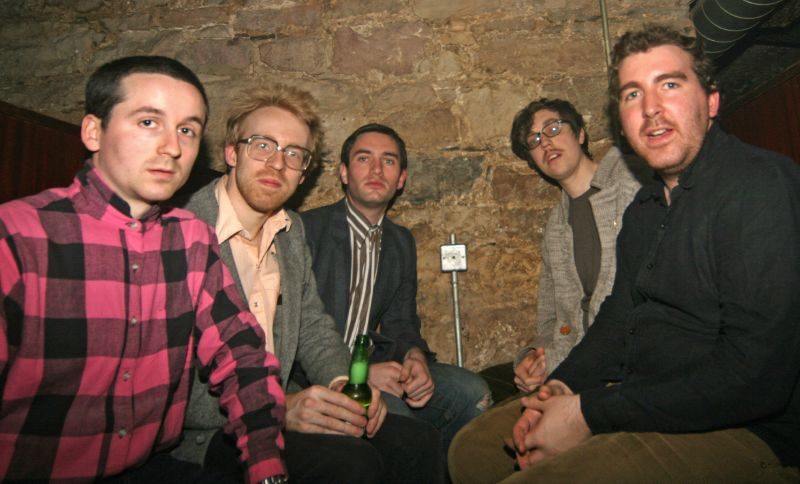
Hot Chip in 2006 (from left to right): Taylor, Doyle, Clarke, Martin, Goddard

Current members

- Alexis Taylor – vocals, synthesizer, guitar, percussion, piano (2000–present)
- Joe Goddard – vocals, synthesizer, percussion (2000–present)
- Owen Clarke – guitar, bass, synthesizer, percussion (2004–present)
- Al Doyle – guitar, backing vocals, synthesizer, percussion, bass, flugelhorn, steel pans (2004–present)
- Felix Martin – drum machines, synthesizer, programming (2004–present)

Former members

- Rob Smoughton (aka "Grovesnor") (2001–2003) - Left to start the solo project Grovesnor. In 2009 he returned as the band's drummer for the One Life Stand tour and in 2012 moved to guitar, bass, percussion, backing vocals and synths. He appears in the videos for "Night and Day", "Don't Deny Your Heart" and "Down" and regularly records with the band, featuring more prominently from the album In Our Heads onwards.

Guest members

- Leo Taylor (of The Invisible) – drums
- Sarah Jones – drums, backing vocals, began playing live drums and backing vocals for Hot Chip's 2012 tour and featured in their official music video for "Night and Day" directed by Peter Serafinowicz; left the band sometime prior to A Bath Full of Ecstasy (2019) to join the backing band for Harry Styles
- Charles Hayward – drums
- Fimber Bravo – steelpan
- Jim Orso – drums during US tours, Fallon/Kimmel appearances, and Coachella week 2 in 2012–2013
- Questlove – drums on Late Night with Jimmy Fallon
- Chris Berry – drums in Washington, DC and during week 1 of Coachella in 2013

== Discography ==
- Coming on Strong (2004)
- The Warning (2006)
- Made in the Dark (2008)
- One Life Stand (2010)
- In Our Heads (2012)
- Why Make Sense? (2015)
- A Bath Full of Ecstasy (2019)
- Freakout/Release (2022)
- A Long Way from Kansas (2027)

== Awards and nominations ==
A2IM Libera Awards

Year	Nominee / work	Award	Result	Ref.
2020	A Bath Full of Ecstasy	Best Dance/Electronic Album	Nominated	

AIM Independent Music Awards

Year	Nominee / work	Award	Result	Ref.
2019	"Hungry Child"	Independent Video of the Year	Won	

Antville Music Video Awards

Year	Nominee / work	Award	Result	Ref.
2006	"Over and Over"	Video of the Year	Won	
2006	"Over and Over"	Most Fun Video	Won	
2006	"And I Was a Boy from School"	Best Art Direction	Nominated	
2007	"Ready for the Floor"	Best Art Direction	Nominated	
2012	"Don't Deny Your Heart"	Best Animated	Nominated	

Berlin Music Video Awards

Year	Nominee / work	Award	Result	Ref.
2020	"Positive"	Best Song	Nominated	

Camerimage

Year	Nominee / work	Award	Result	Ref.
2015	"Need You Now"	Best Music Video	Nominated	

D&AD Awards

Year	Nominee / work	Award	Result	Ref.
2009	"Ready for the Floor"	Best Art Direction	Wood Pencil	

Grammy Awards

Year	Nominee / work	Award	Result
2009	"Ready for the Floor"	Best Dance Recording	Nominated

Ibiza Music Video Festival

Year	Nominee / work	Award	Result
2015	"Need You Now"	Best Editor	Nominated

International Dance Music Awards

Year	Nominee / work	Award	Result
2011	"I Feel Better"	Best Underground Dance Track	Nominated
2013	"Flutes (Sasha Remix)"	Best Progressive Track	Nominated
2013	"Flutes (Sasha Remix)"	Best Alternative/Rock Dance Track	Nominated
2016	"Need You Now"	Best Alternative/Rock Dance Track	Nominated

Ivor Novello Awards

Year	Nominee / work	Award	Result
2007	"Over and Over"	Best Contemporary Song	Nominated

Mercury Prize

Year	Nominee / work	Award	Result
2006	The Warning	Mercury Music Prize	Nominated

Music Video Production Awards

Year	Nominee / work	Award	Result
2006	"And I Was a Boy from School"	Best International Video	Nominated

Popjustice £20 Music Prize

Year	Nominee / work	Award	Result
2006	"Over and Over"	Best British Pop Single	Nominated
2008	"Ready for the Floor"	Best British Pop Single	Nominated

PLUG Awards

Year	Nominee / work	Award	Result	Ref.
2007	"Boy from School"	Song of the Year	Nominated	
2007	"Over and Over"	Song of the Year	Nominated	
2007	The Warning	Album Art/Packaging of the Year	Nominated	

Q Awards

Year	Nominee / work	Award	Result
2008	"Ready for the Floor"	Best Video	Nominated

Rober Awards Music Prize

Year	Nominee / work	Award	Result	Ref.
2010	"I Feel Better"	Best Dance Anthem	Nominated	

UK Music Video Awards

Year	Nominee / work	Award	Result	Ref.
2008	"Ready for the Floor"	Best Indie/Alternative Video	Nominated	
2008	"Ready for the Floor"	Best Art Direction in a Video	Nominated	
2008	"Ready for the Floor"	Best Editing in a Video	Won	
2010	"I Feel Better"	Best Dance Video	Won	
2010	"I Feel Better"	Best Editing in a Video	Nominated	
2012	"Night & Day"	Best VFX in a Video	Nominated	
2012	"Night & Day"	Best Dance Video – UK	Nominated	
2015	"Need You Now"	Best Dance Video – UK	Nominated	
2019	"Hungry Child"	Best Dance Video – UK	Nominated	
2021	"Straight to the Morning"	Best Dance/Electronic Video - UK	Won	

Virgin Media Music Awards

Year	Nominee / work	Award	Result
2010	"I Feel Better"	Best Video	Nominated
2010	One Life Stand	Best Album	Nominated
