= One Life Stand =

Studio album by Hot Chip
- Released: 28 January 2010
- Recorded: 2008–2009
- Genres: Alternative dance; synth-pop; indietronica; electronic rock
- Length: 49:37
- Label: Parlophone
- Producer: Hot Chip

Hot Chip chronology
Made in the Dark (2008)	One Life Stand (2010)	In Our Heads (2012)

Singles from One Life Stand
- 1. "One Life Stand" Released: 30 November 2009; 2. "I Feel Better" Released: 19 April 2010

One Life Stand is the fourth studio album by English synth-pop band Hot Chip, released digitally on 1 February 2010. The physical album was released in the United Kingdom on 1 February 2010 by Parlophone and in the United States the following week on 9 February 2010 by Astralwerks. The album's lead single from the album, "One Life Stand", was released on 30 November 2009. Vocalist Alexis Taylor described the album as "the most warm and soulful sounding record we've made" and expressed hope that people would also say it was "a soulful quality that ties [the album] together".

== Writing and recording ==
One Life Stand was recorded in a different manner than the group's previous albums. Alexis Taylor stated that the album was not "made in short bursts" but was "made with time". The first song created was "Alley Cats", which was written near the end of the band's 2008 tour, the only song to be written and performed whilst on tour. From performing it live, the band formulated a structure for the song that they felt would work and added a number of new features, such as new melodics, new hooks and a new bass line.

The band partly returned to the creative process used in the creation of The Warning in that some parts of songs were written and recorded in Joe Goddard's bedroom, with Taylor also writing from his house and recording in the room he designated as a "music room". These parts were then built upon in a studio where the band had more space, enabling them to "expand on things". Goddard used Cubase to record at his house whilst Logic Pro was used in the studio as well as GarageBand to create parts of songs. Of the latter Taylor said, "that's what I use for recording, and that's like half of the record is going through that program". In regards to the creation of the music, Taylor stated that everyone had involvement in aspects of all of the tracks. Taylor stated that the group felt as though they had exhausted their home studio sound and the possibilities of the instruments they could use at home. Despite this, Taylor explained that he and Joe have a similar work aesthetic and that ideas would "come [...] any time of the day or night"; working on material at home would enable them to "record at home whenever ideas come". However Taylor stated, "even the studio we worked in, it's not like a professional studio that is like, top of the range. It's just a big basement with a desk and various synthesisers and a drum kit."

Goddard said that although the album came together easily, the band had difficulty creating "Hand Me Down Your Love" because "it was just a matter of months and months of adding synthesizers, [and] adding drum parts", which resulted in "something like 160 tracks or pieces of music". As well as this, the band needed to edit out sections that they felt were unnecessary. Goddard discussed the element of time and stated that because the band had more time to create the album, they "tried things out differently" which was ultimately "a little bit unhelpful" due to the number of recorded parts that were never used. Goddard said the band wanted to move away from synths and minimised their presence by making them more subtle. Although the band wanted the album to be a pop record and present "a unified front", Al Doyle stated that the band did not want to lose the "experimental element that [they] had before". To achieve this the band used a broader range of instruments, including a flugelhorn and steelpans in combination with synths and drum machines, as well as a guitar, a drum kit and a piano. Doyle said it was "quite exciting for [the band] to work with that palette of instruments". Whilst the band wanted to create an album that was more cohesive, Taylor said that they did not "try to make it all sound like [the songs are] from the same record". The cohesiveness and unity of the album was a by-product of the way the band spent their time crafting it:

I think naturally we must have been in a slightly more focused state of mind, because we weren't touring. We just had this time to make the record where usually, we've never really taken a break from touring. We've never had much time specifically for recording. So by having it, maybe that gives you greater clarity, your mind is just kinda all in one place, rather than feeling like you're juggling a lot of things and try to make a great album at the same time.

When the album was completed and handed over to the label, their response was positive: "Cool, we really like it".

Unlike Made in the Dark, the song writing approach to One Life Stand was less of a collaborative effort. Only three or four songs were written as a group whilst the rest were written by Goddard and Taylor, though Doyle said "we did have input in the way it was produced". Doyle described the writing process for the album as "a bit like writing a poem" because there was "a certain structure" that the band needed to work to whilst exercising "as much freedom" as they could. Goddard described the band's approach to song-writing as a "mix of things [with] a lot of very careful thinking about rhythms, and interlaying a lot of different ideas and influences" though, at certain points, there would be the sense that something needed to occur and these elements in songs were created spontaneously from the interaction between himself and Taylor: "this melody will somehow suddenly explode in your mind. It's never planned, it just seems to happen; almost like it has to." "Hand Me Down Your Love" and "Slush" were written by Taylor whilst Goddard wrote "Brothers". Doyle stated that "One Life Stand" and "I Feel Better" were put together "in a slightly more piecemeal way".

The album was penned in the summer, with Doyle stating that the band were trying to make an "upbeat, optimistic, summertime record". Goddard said that in previous work, the band were "nervous about being open or emotionally honest" and would sometimes "have a jokiness or guarded sense to some of the words" whereas the new album is more open lyrically. In response to a description of the album as the band's most serious yet, Taylor said, "there was no decision to be more or less comic. I don't feel more or less humorous in my day-to-day" but stated that he could hear melancholy, of which he said was in "almost everything" he writes. He explained that he did not know why this was the case and said, "I can't ever write a song that just sounds completely saccharin. Even if I'm singing about someone being my complete love life, I'm singing about my own inabilities to be as bright as that person." Like Taylor, Doyle said he felt that there was "a certain vein of disquiet and melancholy that runs through the record". Another emotion that the band felt was present in One Life Stand was love. Goddard stated that the band did not set out to write an album about love but due to them feeling "quite settled and happy", he admitted that it had come through in their song writing. In particular, Taylor wrote some of the songs whilst holding his newborn daughter. Taylor felt that due to their growth as songwriters and producers the band had progressed over time, resulting in improved "clarity, melodic simplicity and strength" in their song writing.

=== Collaborators ===
Fimber Bravo and Charles Hayward were asked to collaborate on the album and Taylor said they immediately created unexpected material. Taylor described Hayward as "very capable of coming up with his own stuff" and stated that he was responsible for the drumming in the background of the final chorus of "Hand Me Down Your Love", which Taylor labelled as "explosive". He stated that it was not something the band would have thought to do and that it worked "tremendously well". The recordings Hayward did only lasted for a few hours and Taylor stated, "we were kind of just left to our own devices to see if we could make use of it". Bravo wanted to use the steel pans, featured in the title track "One Life Stand", "in a way that [they are] not really known for".

== Composition ==
In an interview with Pitchfork, Taylor said, "I feel like the melodies on the new album are much more in-your-face, and it's more coherent." Compared with Made in the Dark, where Taylor stated he was interested in embracing the idea of "a messy double album" where each song sounds different sonically, Taylor said One Life Stand "hangs together better and doesn't feel the need to be lots of different things stylistically". Goddard stated that he felt Made in the Dark "was trying to be more futuristic, more crazy, 21st century, synthy and weird" whereas One Life Stand goes "back to basics". Taylor described the album as being "a less cluttered, less busy sounding record than ever before".

Taylor felt that the backing vocals of the song "Slush" sounded like a vocal exercise, using "the same cadence as many very famous melodies" and likened it to "Crazy" by Willie Nelson. Taylor liked the simplicity of "Slush" and stated that "one of the most special things about the album" for him was that Charles Hayward, drummer of This Heat, plays and sings in it.

Unlike the previous albums where the band felt their lyrics were obtuse they wanted to be direct with the song meaning and based the song's lyrics on love and their relationships. Taylor described "Alley Cats" as one of Goddard's more private songs and speculated that the song seemed "to partly be about his mother and wishing that she was alive to hear this song that he's singing". Taylor stated that the words of the chorus "relate to when you're feeling something that you really love is coming to an end, and saying that's not really possible". The song "I Feel Better" was described by Taylor as a song "trying to reach a kind of positive conclusion and positive state of mind whilst also trying to think about the terrible state the world is in". Doyle explained that the lyrics were about "the malaise of living in a world where there's climate change and finding solace in the arms of your partner".

=== Influences ===
The album was influenced by a variety of different people. Taylor stated that "I Feel Better" was based on Joe Goddard "listening to Susan Boyle on TV and [he] thought of [the] string melody [...] by kind of misremembering [the] Les Misérables song". Following this, Taylor wrote the chorus, which he described as sounding like "La Isla Bonita" by Madonna. This was not the only song to be influenced by Boyle; "Keep Quiet" was written by Goddard immediately after seeing Boyle perform "I Dreamed a Dream" on Britain's Got Talent. Goddard said he "found it quite incredible" and listening to it made him want to write a song, which he sent to Taylor, who wrote the words and sent it back." Taylor stated that though the song "Alley Cats" was influenced by the song "That's Us/Wild Combination" by Arthur Russell, which he and Goddard both like, the sound of the finished version was "something a bit more Fleetwood Mac-y". Taylor said that a new bass line, which gave the song a different feel, was responsible for the transformation. Taylor said "We Have Love" had a similar feel to Donna Summer's "I Feel Love" "in terms of the euphoria of the chorus", which he described as being "reminiscent of that".

== Packaging and title ==
Darren Wall (Wallzo), who previously designed the artwork for The Warning and Made in the Dark, was responsible for the album artwork for One Life Stand. As with previous Hot Chip album designs, Wall worked closely with Owen Clarke on the initial idea to reach "a core aesthetic" to experiment with. Wall expressed that over time the taste and influences of the band and himself "are always a little bit different", which results in differing artwork. However, Wall stated that he and Clarke have "hugely overlapping tastes" and tend to "gravitate towards 'mysterious objects' that invite interpretation" such as the blocks featured on the cover of The Warning and "The Artifact" used for Made in the Dark. The design the duo settled on was of a suspended marble head, which was inspired by photographs of statues being lowered into place using coloured canvas slings. Wall felt this created an interesting theme due to the idea of a classical form being "intersected with bright stripes of colour" and the idea appealed to the band. Wall described the cover as being "essentially quite an over-the-top image" and stated that there was "plenty of Giorgio de Chirico and Hipgnosis reference" in it.

The name of the album was chosen because the band could not agree upon any other names. Taylor described the album title as being "a very dumb pun in a way" and felt it was "quite an ugly sounding phrase" but despite this, he felt the sentiment behind made it "quite a nice thing to say" because, as in the title song, it refers to "turning a one night stand into someone's whole life". Taylor stated that he liked "that kind of way of expressing love towards someone" and the idea of using a "simple but quite clumsy turn on [the] cliché" to do so.

Taylor discussed the idea of applying the album title as a metaphor for how it could be read. He felt the title suggested longevity and stated that although it was not the band's intention to create an album "that'll be around for a long time", there was a "kind of [an] underlying guide to make songs worthwhile for a long time, and not just temporary".

== Release and promotion ==
General manager of marketing for Astralwerks, Glenn Mendlinger, stated that the first single of the album, "One Life Stand", had not been "officially serviced" but was given to some "key tastemakers", reaching number five at KCRW, a Los Angeles public radio station. He said, "This is also the first time we're taking the band wider at radio, not just to college and speciality stations, but to commercial alternative".

To promote One Life Stand, Hot Chip toured a variety of places, including the UK in February 2010 as well as Europe with ten dates in Belgium, France, Germany, Italy and the Netherlands in March 2010 and embarked on a US tour with The xx for six dates at large venues as of 19 April 2010. Rehearsals were set to begin in January 2010 with Goddard stating, "I can't really remember how to play any of the new songs at this point".

As well as touring, Hot Chip promoted the album by performing their then-current single "I Feel Better" on Later... with Jools Holland on 13 April 2010, as well as previous single "One Life Stand".

The album was released on two CD formats: a standard album, which contains ten tracks; and a deluxe edition, which includes the album and a bonus DVD with a "making of" documentary and three live tracks recorded in Brixton in 2008. The album was also released on 12-inch vinyl in two editions: a standard album and a special edition gatefold designed by Wallzo. The special-edition vinyl release was limited to 1,000 hand-numbered copies worldwide and consisted of two 200-gram records, pressed on the EMI 1400 in Hayes, Hillingdon. It was released by The Vinyl Factory and contained a number of special features such as an exclusive art print. It was claimed that the format would become "an instant collectors item".

== Critical reception ==
Professional ratings
Aggregate scores
Source	Rating
AnyDecentMusic?	7.6/10
Metacritic	79/100
Review scores
Source	Rating
AllMusic	3.5/5 stars
The A.V. Club	B+
The Daily Telegraph	5/5 stars
Entertainment Weekly	B+
The Guardian	4/5 stars
NME	7/10
Pitchfork	8.4/10
Rolling Stone	3.5/5 stars
Spin	6/10
Uncut	4/5 stars

One Life Stand received generally positive reviews from music critics. At Metacritic, which assigns a normalised rating out of 100 to reviews from mainstream publications, the album received an average score of 79, based on 34 reviews. The Observer's Gareth Grundy wrote that the album "not only sees [the band] back on track, it's also their best work, paring down those past excesses and unifying them into an extraordinarily lovely whole." Huw Jones of Slant Magazine described it as "a smooth, sleek, and splendid pop record" where "[e]ach individual track sticks to its own tone and theme, while the group gracefully sashays through several shifts in tone and tempo." Heather Phares of AllMusic noted that "their sensitive side dominates One Life Stand—they don't sound ready for the floor, they sound ready to settle down. Even the most energetic songs feel tempered compared to the neon energy of Made in the Dark and The Warning's hits." She added that "[t]hough this emotional nakedness is an unusual move after Made in the Dark pushed Hot Chip to a new level of attention and acclaim, it also shows they're in it for the long haul." Nick Annan from Clash deemed it "different to Made In The Dark but a more cohesive and more heartfelt effort too. One Life Stand sees Hot Chip let us into their hearts as well as their thoughts." Benjamin Boles of Now commented that "[i]t's not that they've completely reinvented their sound as much as they've simply focused and polished it up. The real shift is in their attitude, which allows them to embrace earnestness and write some straightforward love songs. It's a strategy that could have backfired, but instead it has inspired their strongest and most consistent album so far." Uncut's Andrew Mueller believed that the album "contains little trace of the discordant outings or rather rigidly utilitarian dance grooves they seemed to feel obliged to deploy on previous albums. This is an album that sees Hot Chip freeing themselves of the surly bonds of their more orthodox dance and electronic influences and settling comfortably into the orbit of New Order and Pet Shop Boys."

The A.V. Club reviewer Michaelangelo Matos opined that "while One Life Stand's mindset is Hot Chip's most overtly serious, the album is also its most musically accomplished. The melodies are Alexis Taylor and Joe Goddard's longest-lined, and the melodies often unfurl beautifully." Ian Mathers of PopMatters viewed it as "Hot Chip's most kinetic album" and stated that "One Life Stand may be less pleasingly idiosyncratic than Hot Chip's previous work, but it pays off in their most consistently winning set of songs to date. It's still not quite as raucous as their incredible live show, [...] but those who felt that Made in the Dark never built up enough momentum ought to find this one's straightforward drive more satisfying." Scott Plagenhoef of Pitchfork named One Life Stand the band's "most consistent and most complete record", but remarked that "it's missing an A-list single on par with 'Boy From School', 'Over and Over', or 'Ready for the Floor'. It's also missing dance songs in the mode of the latter two, focusing instead on Hot Chip at their most lush and romantic." Drowned in Sound's Hayden Woolley wrote that the album "sees their familiar pick'n'mix genre-shopping combined with unprecedented levels of Mills & Boon sentimentality. It's a heady cocktail, but when mixed in the right proportions the results are stunning." Jamie Fullerton of NME concluded that the album "does have some of the best songs of the year on it. But, again, waiting for Hot Chip to make that classic album is a bit like waiting for an alcoholic parent to arrive at your birthday party. There's a kind of unconditional love that'll keep you hoping every time one comes around, but there may be a point where you have to accept that it's just never going to happen." Chris Beanland of BBC Music felt that "[t]his is an imbalanced record, and one that leaves you frustrated rather than elated. But despite the blips, they have dished up at least two cerebral bangers here." Andy Gill of The Independent characterised it as "an album full of earnest endeavour, but lacking verve and creative zest."

Pitchfork placed it at number 24 on its list of "The Top 50 Albums of 2010".

== Track listing ==
All tracks are written by Hot Chip.

No.	Title	Length
1.	"Thieves in the Night"	6:09
2.	"Hand Me Down Your Love"	4:33
3.	"I Feel Better"	4:41
4.	"One Life Stand"	5:23
5.	"Brothers"	4:21
6.	"Slush"	6:29
7.	"Alley Cats"	5:21
8.	"We Have Love"	4:28
9.	"Keep Quiet"	4:02
10.	"Take It In"	4:10
Total length:		49:37

iTunes Store bonus tracks
No.	Title	Length
11.	"One Life Stand" (track-by-track interview)	9:52
12.	"One Life Stand" (Carl Craig Remix) (US and Canada only)	10:20

Japanese edition bonus tracks
No.	Title	Length
11.	"Bubbles"	5:15
12.	"Build a House"	4:12
Total length:		59:09

Deluxe edition bonus DVD
No.	Title	Length
1.	"Brothers" (short film)
2.	"One Pure Thought" (live in Brixton 2008)
3.	"Alley Cats" (live in Brixton 2008)
4.	"No Fit State" (live in Brixton 2008)

== Personnel ==
Credits adapted from the liner notes of One Life Stand.

- Hot Chip – recording, production, performers (all tracks); mixing (tracks 6, 7, 9)
- Mike Marsh – mastering
- Tom Hopkins – engineering (tracks 1–8, 10)
- Dan Carey – mixing (tracks 1–5, 8, 10)
- Alexis Smith – mixing assistance (tracks 1–5, 8, 10)
- Leo Taylor – drums (tracks 1, 4)
- Fimber Bravo – steelpans (tracks 1, 3, 4, 6)
- Charles Hayward – drums (tracks 2, 6); chorus vocals (track 6)
- Geese (Vince Sipprell and Emma Smith) – strings, string arrangements, string recording (track 2)
- Wallzo – design
- Owen Clarke – design

== Charts ==
Chart performance for One Life Stand
Chart (2010)	Peak position
Australian Albums (ARIA)	27
Australian Dance Albums (ARIA)	6
Belgian Albums (Ultratop Flanders)	48
Canadian Albums (Nielsen SoundScan)	70
European Albums (Billboard)	28
French Albums (SNEP)	115
German Albums (Offizielle Top 100)	54
Greek International Albums (IFPI)	28
Irish Albums (IRMA)	17
Swedish Albums (Sverigetopplistan)	41
Swiss Albums (Schweizer Hitparade)	40
UK Albums (Official Charts)	11
UK Dance Albums (Official Charts)	1
US Billboard 200	103
US Top Dance Albums (Billboard)	5

== Certifications and sales ==
Certifications and sales for One Life Stand
Region	Certification	Certified units/sales
United Kingdom (BPI)	Silver	60,000^{^}
United States	—	30,000
^{^} Shipments figures based on certification alone.

== Release history ==
Release history for One Life Stand
Region	Date	Label	Ref.
Netherlands	28 January 2010	EMI	
Australia	29 January 2010	EMI	
Germany	29 January 2010	EMI	
Ireland	29 January 2010	Parlophone	
United Kingdom	1 February 2010	Parlophone	
France	1 February 2010	EMI	
Canada	2 February 2010	EMI	
Japan	3 February 2010	EMI	
Sweden	3 February 2010	EMI	
United States	9 February 2010	Astralwerks	
Italy	12 February 2010	EMI	
