= Made in the Dark =

2008 studio album by Hot Chip

Studio album by Hot Chip
- Released: 4 February 2008
- Studios: The Strongroom, London
- Genres: Indietronica; alternative dance
- Length: 53:57
- Label: EMI
- Producer: Hot Chip

Hot Chip chronology
| DJ-Kicks: Hot Chip (2007) | Made in the Dark (2008) | One Life Stand (2010) |

Singles from Made in the Dark
- 1. "Shake a Fist" Released: 23 October 2007; 2. "Ready for the Floor" Released: 28 January 2008; 3. "One Pure Thought" Released: 12 May 2008; 4. "Hold On"/"Touch Too Much" Released: 21 September 2008

Made in the Dark is the third studio album by the English synth-pop band Hot Chip, released on 4 February 2008 through EMI Records internationally and Astralwerks and DFA Records in the United States. Comprising 13 tracks, a defining feature of the album is the strong presence of romantic ballads. The title ballad was described as "sublime" by one critic, although not all the ballads received universal praise. Alexis Taylor, the main contributor to the lyrics, said he was proud of the album lyrically and felt that feeling of love and happiness, partly the result of his recent marriage, had contributed to the album's romantic tone.

Critics stated that songs such as "Ready for the Floor" and "Bendable Poseable" were reminiscent of their previous release, The Warning. The style of the album was not considered as big a leap forward as the changes evident between Coming on Strong (2004) to The Warning (2006). It was said that Hot Chip had honed their music by using quirks of their musical style to make more accomplished music. However, some critics felt that the album lacked focus, containing too many varied elements; it was described as "loveable but flawed". Commercially, Made in the Dark peaked at number four on the UK Album Chart, number 25 on the Australian album charts, and entered at number 109 on the US Billboard 200. Several singles have been released from the album, including "Shake a Fist", "Ready for the Floor", which reached number six on the UK Singles Chart, and "One Pure Thought".

== Production ==
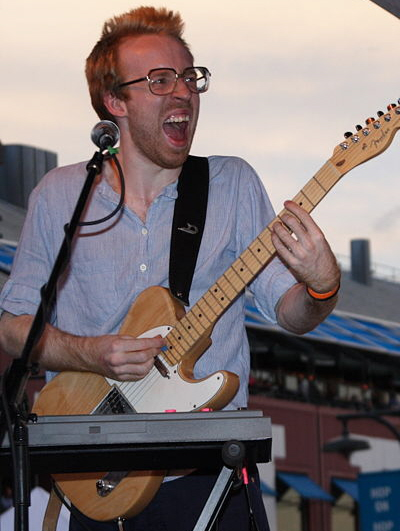
Al Doyle

Hot Chip mostly record their music in a bedroom. However, the band took a different approach in recording Made in the Dark to make it sound "not quite so homemade". Recording took place in a variety of locations, including in-studio and live venues, to make "different acoustic spaces to be obvious to the listener". In regards to editing, Taylor said that Hot Chip have "never really been too good at bothering to get rid of little imperfections in the music"; he felt they added personality and said that "it's good not to be too dogmatic about it if that's what suits the song". Hot Chip used a variety of vocal structures, including layered vocals, where two takes of the same vocals were added together, changed by idiosyncrasies from the way it had been sung, and the doubling of a single performance, shifted out of beat.

Drummer Felix Martin said Made in the Dark was a "true group effort". The process began with Taylor and Goddard creating lyrics, then Goddard would produce parts of tracks, which Alexis would then add "lyrical content and melodies and so on that he's thought of while he's on the bus or in the bath or wherever he happened to be". The other three members of Hot Chip, Owen Clarke, Al Doyle, and Felix Martin would then "have some influence on the way the songs are put together."

Some equipment used to create the album remained the same as previous albums—Goddard used Steinberg Cubase SX3 on his laptop and Doyle and Martin worked on songs using Apple Logic in their studio. To create the chorus for "Ready for the Floor", Goddard used plug-ins from Arturia, such as Moog Modular. He used two sound channels to control noise and melody, and placed the noise channel in Cubase and had it follow the melody, to make it "punchier". With "Bendable Poseable", Goddard recorded live percussion parts with a Shure Beta 57A mic going directly into Cubase and "fashioned them into a jittery, three-minute loop". This was emailed to Taylor, who then recorded the main vocals for the song. To create the beat in "Shake a Fist" Martin used the Elektron Machinedrum.

At the London-based studio called the Strongroom, "One Pure Thought", "Hold On" and "Shake a Fist" were recorded live, instead of on multitrack, and were subsequently pieced together. This was the first occasion that Hot Chip had recorded music in a studio environment.

=== Featured collaborators ===
In March 2008, Hot Chip re-recorded several songs from Made in the Dark, with Robert Wyatt.

The album features Emma Smith, who had previously joined with Hot Chip to play violin and saxophone on their first two albums.

==== Kylie Minogue ====
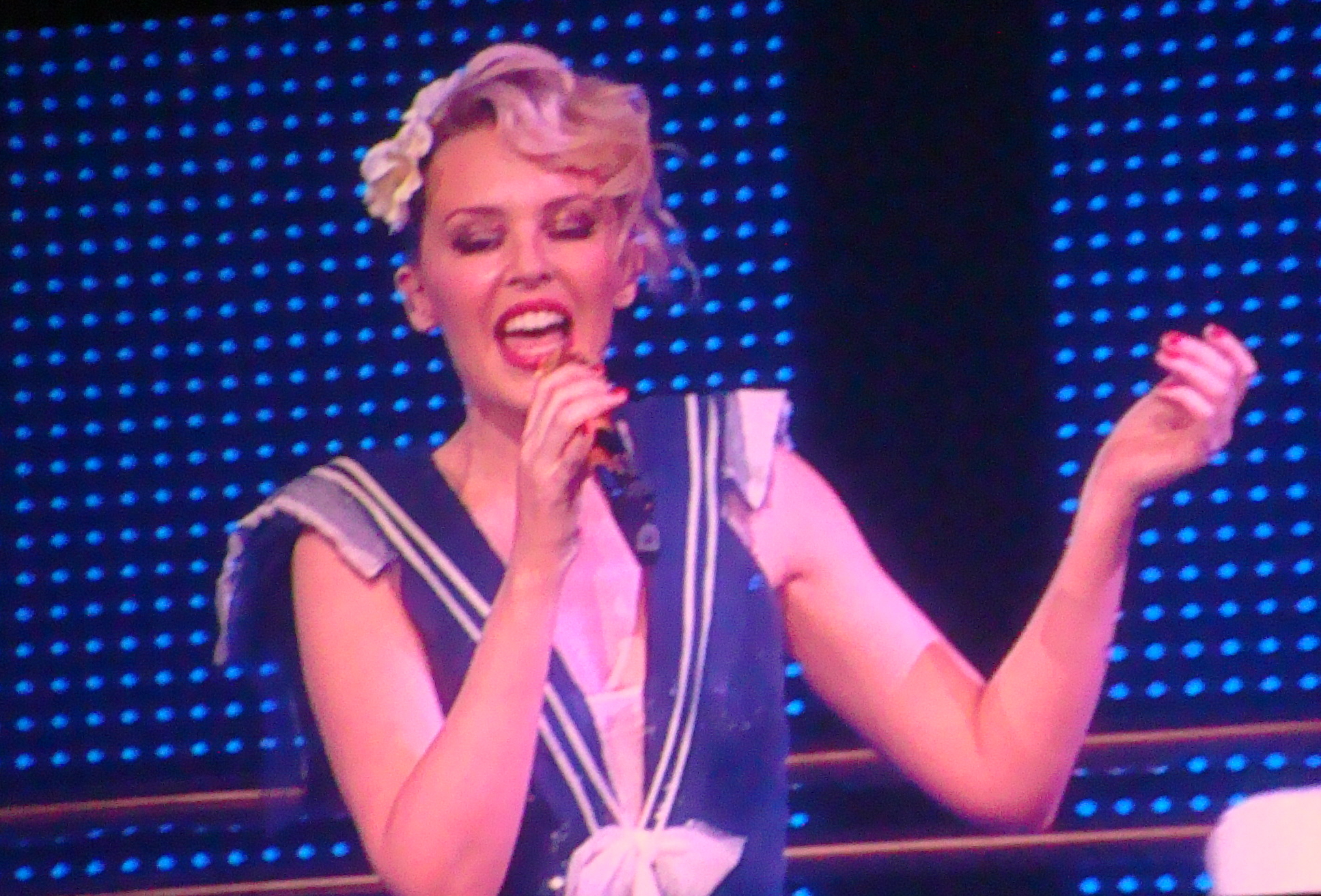
Kylie Minogue

In October 2007, MTV reported that Hot Chip was planning to give "Ready for the Floor" to Kylie Minogue. Other reports incorrectly suggested that Hot Chip had written Made in the Dark's second single, "Ready for the Floor" specifically for Minogue. Taylor explained that it was a misunderstanding; "It started because someone asked me if we would ever write for Kylie. I said that we'd been asked to write for her but we'd never got round to it. And I said if we had to give her one of our songs, "Ready for the Floor" would probably be the most suitable. From that, I got misquoted. We didn't write "Ready for the Floor" for Kylie, didn't send it to her and she never heard it."

After the first rumour circulated, Joe Goddard created a reverse rumour, saying that Minogue had written a track for Hot Chip. He told NME, "Kylie wrote a song for us, She sent it through our management to us—it was totally bizarre. It was the beginnings of a track—I think she wrote it and just thought, 'This would be perfect for Hot Chip', or possibly for a collaboration. It's a crazy song. It's industrial and clanging and even has farmyard animal noises on it. It's the kind of music you'd never normally associate with Kylie. When I'm allowed to send it around it's going to change a few people's ideas about her. Maybe it's one for our next album, after Made in the Dark." Taylor later admitted that it was a joke created to fool people because the band were tired of people phoning them up to ask why Minogue had apparently rejected a song she did not hear.

In January 2010, Goddard stated that "at the beginning there was some contact. As I recall, we were going to do a session with one of her writers" but both Hot Chip and Minogue were too busy at the time. He added "there was a grain of truth in the beginning, but then it all snowballed into some big silly thing". When asked, in 2010, about giving a song to Minogue, he stated that it would be "amazing".

== Composition ==
=== Influences ===
The album is influenced by music Goddard and Taylor listened to during their childhood and adolescence, such as Prince's Sign o' the Times and the Beatles' self-titled album. Taylor explained why Hot Chip's albums "go from one mood to another so readily", by saying "Eclectic music has been our first musical background" and that he and Goddard had different musical interests when they were younger. Made in the Dark is influenced by contemporary artists such as Black Dice and Will Oldham. Taylor appreciated Oldham for his minimalism of "just acoustic guitar and harmonium and voice for the whole record" and wanted Hot Chip to emulate him.

=== Musical style ===
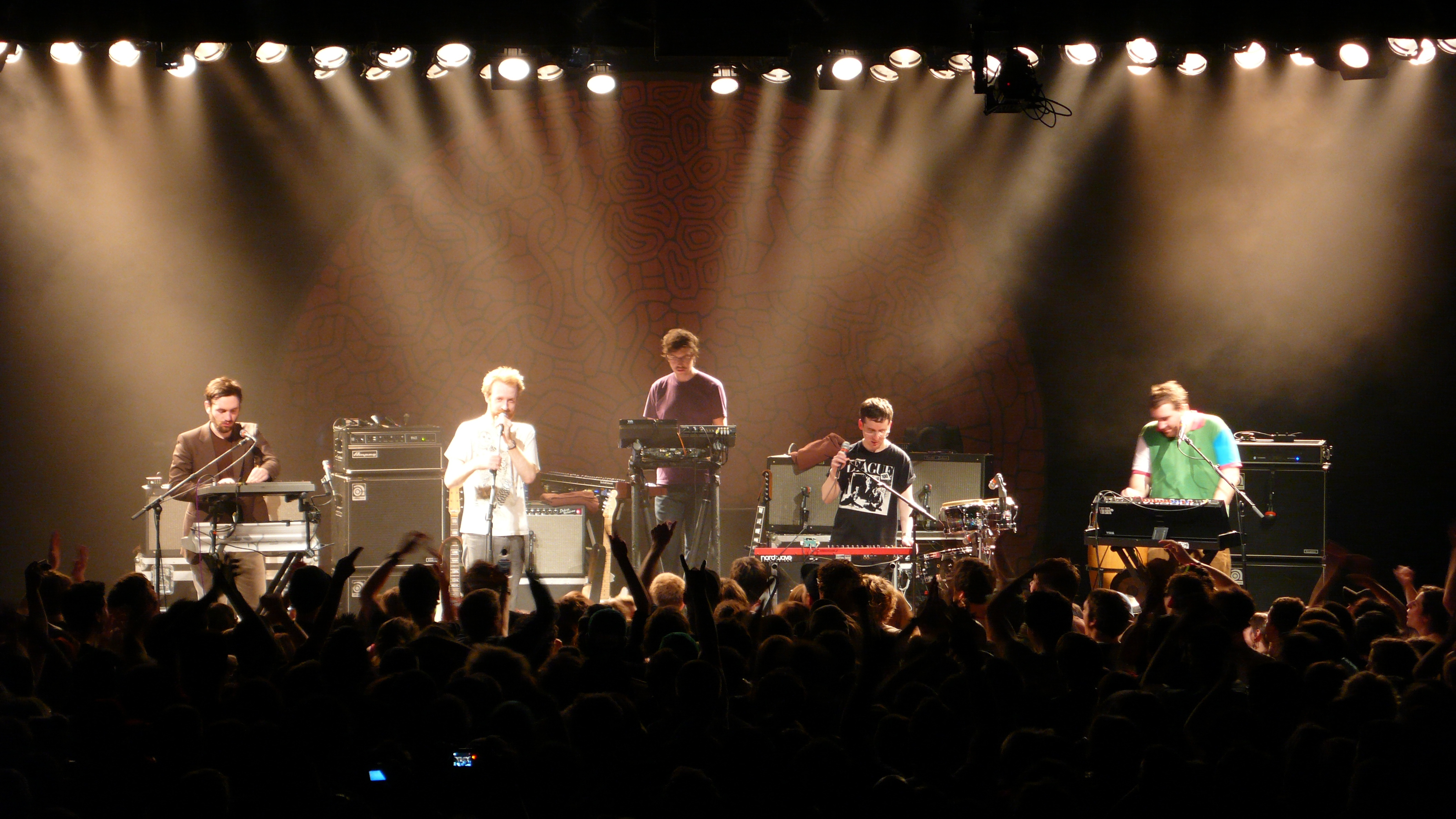
Hot Chip performing songs from Made in the Dark on tour

In an interview with Pitchfork in October 2007, Taylor said there would be an equal proportion of electronic elements to live material, as the band doesn't "do things by adding one thing and taking something else away". The album contained maximalist and minimalist songs; several tracks on the album were influenced by rock and heavy metal music, and the track "Wrestlers" started taking a new direction because the band was "wrestling with the idea of making an R. Kelly kind of slick R and B number" and ultimately "[sounded] more like Randy Newman's "Short People". He said, "if the press release says it's faster and rockier it doesn't account for the fact that there are more ballads on this record than any other record." Taylor said that feelings of happiness and love influenced the album's romantic feel.

Martin told The Georgia Straight that the group is "afflicted with something akin to musical attention-deficit disorder" and said that the group "get bored quite easily [...] with [their] own records at times". He elaborated by saying that the group isn't "really interested in reproducing the same sound" because they don't find it exciting.

Taylor stated Hot Chip "didn't set out to make something with one mood" and that he thought the band's style of "jump[ing] all over the place stylistically" made sense as a record. In an interview with The Georgia Straight, Martin expressed that Hot Chip didn't want to create a "'classic' record that would have a particular sound" as they wanted to make music that was "quite experimental and out-there". Made in the Dark was intended to represent the "whole live sound of the band" and they are "a band as much as originally having been a duo".

=== Lyrics ===
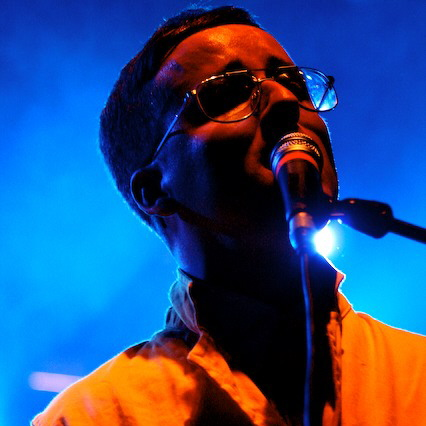
Alexis Taylor

The song "Ready for the Floor" contains an allusion to the 1989 film, Batman, with the line, "You're my number one guy". In an interview with The Fader magazine, Taylor said the reference was a result of thinking about the Batman film, which has many things that Taylor is fond of, such as the Prince soundtrack. He commented that sometimes those items "seep into what we're writing about" and said that he likes to reference "in an oblique way". He conjectured that he had included the line to say something to "everyone in the band, particularly to Joe [Goddard], 'You're my number one guy, why is there any problems between any of us?' " The song "Out at the Pictures" is an homage to British pub chain J D Wetherspoon.

== Packaging ==
=== Artwork ===
Darren Wall (Wallzo) and Owen Clarke designed the artwork after several graphical experiments. After the initial experimentation, Wall wanted to create a cover that was "more brooding and conservative" and formed a list of ideas that the band had responded positively to. The list included dual colour illustrations, circles, and verdigris—the green coating formed on copper during oxygenation. Wall amalgamated the ideas to create the image used on the album's cover, which was named "The Artifact". The image was embossed on metallic copper card to give a "tactile feel" that would imply the album was "an object rather than illustration-based design."

=== Album title ===
Several titles were considered during production, including "Shot Down in Flames" and "IV". The former was rejected because Martin thought it sounded like a title The Beta Band would use. Taylor supported the name "IV" because he liked "giving people the wrong impression all the time", and defended his opinion, saying "if [people] give us any time, they would see that we're very serious about comedy ... and serious things as well". The album was called "Made in the Dark" because it was a title the band agreed on. Taylor considered the eponymous track to be one of his favourite songs, and thought it was nice to name the album after a thoughtful song, in contrast to Coming on Strong and The Warning, which he described as being "big, slightly jokey, macho phrases".

== Release and reception ==
Made in the Dark charted for 23 weeks in over 10 different charts, entering the UK Album Chart at number four, the Billboard Top Heatseekers chart at number one and the Billboard Top Electronic Albums chart at number two. The album, according to Nielsen SoundScan data reported by Billboard, has sold 47,000 copies and has been certified Gold for UK sales.

"Shake a Fist", the first single to be released from the album, was released on 12" vinyl single at the beginning of October 2007 but did not chart. The second single released, "Ready for the Floor", charted for 24 weeks in five different charts, peaking at number six on the UK Singles Top 75.

=== Critical reception ===
Professional ratings
Aggregate scores
| Source | Rating |
|---|---|
| Metacritic | 78/100 |
Review scores
| Source | Rating |
| AllMusic | 4/5 stars |
| Blender | 4/5 stars |
| Entertainment Weekly | B− |
| The Guardian | 3/5 stars |
| The Observer | 4/5 stars |
| Pitchfork | 7.0/10 |
| Rolling Stone | 4/5 stars |
| Spin | 4/5 stars |
| The Times | 4/5 stars |
| Uncut | 4/5 stars |

Made in the Dark received generally positive reviews from music critics. At Metacritic, which assigns a normalised rating out of 100 to reviews from mainstream publications, the album received an average score of 78, based on 40 reviews. There were mixed comments about the ballads; two reviewers noted a disparity between the energy of the ballads to different songs. Drowned in Sound commented that, "ballads remain a strong suit, particularly the easy grace of the title track, but more often than not sit awkwardly next to the more toothsome numbers and feel under-produced by comparison" with similar comments from AllMusic who said, "Made in the Dark's main weakness might be its ballads, but that may just be in comparison to its many energetic moments, which are so addictive that it feels like a forced come-down whenever the band slows things down." However, The Observer gave a positive evaluation of the ballads; "Hot Chip have had a happy way with a subliminal power ballad. And Made in the Dark can boast four of the best." Pitchfork described it as a "patchy, turbulent record" due to the use of many different individual components and also said that it was a "good record but not a great one". Martin responded to the criticism made by Pitchfork:

I think the fact that we've managed to be successful, in getting good chart positions in the U.K. and at the same time making a record that is actually quite weird and confusing to even a site like Pitchfork—the guy doesn't seem to actually get what we're trying to do—it's kind of cool to me.

Pitchfork, despite their initial rating, went on to list the album number 23 on their list of the fifty best albums of 2008, and would later state that "its bold charms have lent it a fond longevity." Another element that caused mixed reception was the use of a Todd Rundgren sample in "Shake a Fist", which musicOMH called "delightful" but The Guardian described it as grating. musicOMH, whose description of the album was positive, said that tracks "Ready for the Floor" and "Bendable Poseable" had elements reminiscent of previous album The Warning. The Times said that although the execution was "novel" and the song "Made in the Dark" was "exquisite", that much of Made in the Dark "seems to spring from sticky relationship issues". Comparisons were also made to Paul McCartney's McCartney II album with songs like "Wrestlers", "Bendable Poseable", "Whistle for Will" and "We're Looking for a Lot of Love", which were described as having the "airless proto-electronica" of McCartney II.

In regards to lyrics, AllMusic said the album "boasts some of Hot Chip's most kinetic music, with rhythms and melodies that are just as hyper-articulate as the word play." Rolling Stone summarised the album as having "catchy tunes, monster grooves, and lyrics resolving the heartfelt and the smartass".

== Track listing ==
All songs written by Hot Chip, except "Shake a Fist", co-written by Todd Rundgren.

Made in the Dark track listing
| No. | Title | Length |
|---|---|---|
| 1. | "Out at the Pictures" | 4:26 |
| 2. | "Shake a Fist" | 5:11 |
| 3. | "Ready for the Floor" | 3:52 |
| 4. | "Bendable Poseable" | 3:46 |
| 5. | "We're Looking for a Lot of Love" | 4:43 |
| 6. | "Touch Too Much" | 4:05 |
| 7. | "Made in the Dark" | 3:00 |
| 8. | "One Pure Thought" | 4:53 |
| 9. | "Hold On" | 6:20 |
| 10. | "Wrestlers" | 3:45 |
| 11. | "Don't Dance" | 4:42 |
| 12. | "Whistle for Will" | 2:23 |
| 13. | "In the Privacy of Our Love" | 2:52 |

iTunes bonus tracks

14. "So Deep" – 2:34
15. "With Each New Day" – 2:58

iTunes deluxe version bonus tracks

14. "Touch Too Much" (Fake Blood Remix) – 5:52
15. "Hold On" (Switch LDN Remix) – 4:01
16. "Touch Too Much" (Ewan Pearson Remix) – 9:32
17. "Wrestlers" (Video) – 3:59
18. West Coast Tour Documentary – 17:25

Japanese bonus tracks

14. "Bubbles They Bounce" – 5:53
15. "My Brother Is Watching Me" – 3:49

Special edition bonus DVD

1. "Shake a Fist" (Live at Melt!)
2. "And I Was a Boy from School" (Live at Melt!)
3. "Hold On" (Live at the Electric Ballroom)
4. "One Pure Thought" (Live at Glastonbury Festival)
5. "Over and Over" (Live at Glastonbury Festival)

== Personnel ==
Hot Chip

- Alexis Taylor – vocals, synthesiser, guitar, percussion, piano
- Joe Goddard – vocals, synthesiser, percussion, mix control
- Owen Clarke – guitar, bass, design
- Al Doyle – guitar, synthesiser, percussion, backing vocals
- Felix Martin – drum machines

Additional personnel

- Dan Carey – mixing
- Jonathan Digby – engineer
- Ian Dowling – engineer (assistant)
- James Shaw – engineer (assistant)
- Darren Simpson – engineer (assistant)
- Alexis Smith – mixing (assistant)
- Emma Smith – violin, saxophone
- Wallzo – design

== Charts ==
=== Weekly charts ===
Weekly chart performance for Made in the Dark
| Chart (2008) | Peak position |
|---|---|
| Australian Albums (ARIA) | 25 |
| Australian Dance Albums (ARIA) | 6 |
| Belgian Albums (Ultratop Flanders) | 25 |
| French Albums (SNEP) | 89 |
| German Albums (Offizielle Top 100) | 34 |
| Irish Albums (IRMA) | 9 |
| Scottish Albums (Official Charts) | 5 |
| Swedish Albums (Sverigetopplistan) | 35 |
| UK Albums (Official Charts) | 4 |
| UK Dance Albums (Official Charts) | 1 |
| US Billboard 200 | 109 |
| US Heatseekers Albums (Billboard) | 1 |
| US Top Dance Albums (Billboard) | 2 |

=== Year-end charts ===
Year-end chart performance for Made in the Dark
| Chart (2008) | Position |
|---|---|
| Australian Dance Albums (ARIA) | 43 |
| UK Albums (OCC) | 157 |
