= David Bason =

Music manager and record executive

- Born: February 22, 1973 (age 53)
- Occupation: Music manager
- Labels: RCA Records, Roadrunner Records, Decca Records, Century Media Records, Red Bull Records

David Bason (born February 22, 1973) is a music manager and record executive. Working in A&R at RCA Records, Roadrunner Records, Decca Records, Century Media Records and Red Bull Records, he signed The Strokes, The Dresden Dolls, Amanda Palmer, New York Dolls, Matt Skiba, Blaqk Audio, Jesse Malin, Badflower and The Cult.

== Artist management ==
Bason has managed Thirty Seconds To Mars, James Iha (Smashing Pumpkins/A Perfect Circle), Laura Jane Grace, Flora Cash, Cerebral Ballzy, Beta Radio, Justin Tranter's band Semi Precious Weapons, Pink Mountaintops, Black Mountain, Zipper Club, Strand of Oaks, The Joy Formidable, The Devil Makes Three, Ron Gallo, and Blondfire, as well as Grammy-winning, platinum producer/engineers, including Ryan Hadlock (Zach Bryan, The Lumineers, Brandi Carlile, Vance Joy) Karen Kosowski (Mickey Guyton, Pentatonix) Ted Hutt (Dropkick Murphys, Gaslight Anthem, Old Crow Medicine Show), David Kahne (Lana Del Rey, Sublime), Dennis Herring (Elvis Costello, Counting Crows), Jon Kaplan (Cage the Elephant, Gavin DeGraw), David Bendeth (Paramore, Bring Me The Horizon), Elvis Baskette (Slash, Incubus) Chris Shaw (Public Enemy, Bob Dylan), and Kenny Carkeet (Night Riots, Bear Hands).

== Career ==
Bason began his career as tour manager of Treble Charger in 1997, where he met David Bendeth, a subsequent management client. In 2001, after leading the charge at RCA Records to sign the band The Strokes, Bason began running the alternative arm of Roadrunner Records, where his first signing was The Dresden Dolls – whose lead singer Amanda Palmer went on to become a Kickstarter cover girl and New York Times Best-Selling author, as well as signing The Cult and The New York Dolls for their 2006 comeback album, One Day It Will Please Us To Remember Even This.

In 2006, Bason founded the Universal Music-distributed Stay Gold Records where he signed punk rock bands and produced several dub reggae remixes.

In 2009, after seven years at Roadrunner Records and A&R stints with Red Bull Records, Decca Records and Century Media records (where he signed Alkaline Trio's Matt Skiba and an AFI side project), Bason was recruited to join the LA-based boutique firm The MGMT Company. While there, Bason managed Thirty Seconds to Mars, the Atlanta-based group The Constellations (Virgin Records), guided the indie-pop band Blondfire to a bidding war deal with Warner Bros., and signed the infamous New York black punk band Cerebral Ballzy to Julian Casablancas' Cult Records label.

In 2014, Bason was asked by Phil McGraw to be president of Hundred Handed Records which released Coheed and Cambria's albums including The Color Before the Sun.

Bason has headed the west coast at 7S Management since 2019. Bason also sings and writes for the band Barfbag (with members of The Dresden Dolls and AWOLNATION), the band War Orphan (with ex-member of Sick of It All Richie Cipriano), and the band Lords of The Drift (with ex-members of Thirty Seconds to Mars and Black Mountain).
