= Self-Taught Learner =

EP by Lissy Trullie
- Released: February 17, 2009
- Genre: Indie
- Length: 24:28
- Label: American Myth (U.S.); Wichita (UK)

Professional ratings
Review scores
Source	Rating
Altsounds.com	4/5 stars
Blender	3.5/5 stars
Houston Press	(?)
Rolling Stone	3.5/5 stars

Self-Taught Learner is the debut EP from American Indie singer-songwriter Lissy Trullie, released on February 17, 2009. It was released on June 29, 2009 in the UK. The EP was recorded in New York City with members of Trullie’s live band.

The EP was re-released by Downtown Records in October 2009, including the new songs "Don't To Do", "You Bleed You", "Hold Your Head", and a cover version of "Just a Friend", by Biz Markie, recorded with Adam Green.

"Ready for the Floor" is a cover of the 2008 song by English alternative dance group Hot Chip.

== Track listing ==
1. "Boy Boy" (Lissy Trullie) – 3:36
2. "She Said" (Eben D'Amico, Trullie)– 3:59
3. "Self Taught Learner" (Trullie) – 4:13
4. "Money" (Trullie) – 3:57
5. "Forget About It" (Trullie) – 3:12
6. "Ready for the Floor" (Hot Chip) – 4:02
