= One Pure Thought =

Single by Hot Chip

from the album Made in the Dark
- B-side: "Slow Death"
- Released: 12 May 2008
- Length: 4:53
- Label: EMI
- Songwriters: Owen Clarke; Al Doyle; Joe Goddard; Felix Martin; Alexis Taylor

Hot Chip singles chronology
"Ready for the Floor" (2008)	"One Pure Thought" (2008)	"One Life Stand" (2010)

"One Pure Thought" is a song by English synth-pop band Hot Chip, which serves as the third single from their 2008 album Made in the Dark. It was released on 12 May 2008.

== Music video ==
The video, directed by Bevis Martin (brother of Hot Chip member Felix Martin) and Charlie Youle, was described as having an "animated band performing in a pointillist world populated by simple geometric shapes, the kind of place Roy Lichtenstein might have liked to hang out in." The video was produced by Richard Barnett and Trunk Animation.

== Critical reception ==
The Guardian said the "cringeworthy, funky guitar chords" that introduce the song are the "best thing" about the song because they "sweeten the flurry of Casio beats and propulsive melody which follow". However, Pitchfork Media said that it opens with "gnarled guitar chords and keening synths" and described the song as "infectious". The song was described by Manchester Evening News as "one of the strongest songs from Made in the Dark, having both lyrical and rhythmic appeal with "infectiously bouncy tropical drums and quirky melodies". Digital Spy said the vocals were "impossibly charming [...] choirboy vocals" and described the song as eccentric with an "unmistakably Hot Chip concoction of rock guitar riffs, electro atmospherics and digital calypso rhythms". The melody was said to be reminiscent of vintage New Order, which Allmusic also reported; "a witty, wordy gem that comes across like Paul McCartney backed by New Order". Boomkat.com said the song "gets all the electronic stuff right but sounds rather flimsy when it comes to vocals and guitar, which as per usual are a bit of a shambles".

== Track listing ==
=== CD single ===
1. "One Pure Thought" – 4:53
2. "We're Looking For A Lot Of Love" (Christmas Recording) – 4:36
3. "Ready For The Floor" (Hot Chip V.I.P. Mix) – 6:58
4. "One Pure Thought (Dominik Eulberg Remix Edit)" – 6:02
5. "One Pure Thought (video)"

=== 7" single ===
1. "One Pure Thought" — 4:53
2. "Slow Death" — 2:12

== Personnel ==
- Dan Carey – mixing
- Bevis Martin – artwork illustration
- Alexis Smith – assistant
- Wallzo - artwork design
- Charlie Youle – artwork illustration

== Chart positions ==
"One Pure Thought" was not as commercially successful as the previous release, "Ready for the Floor". It charted for 1 week on the UK Singles Top 75, where it reached position #53.
