= Shake a Fist =

Single by Hot Chip

from the album Made in the Dark
- Released: 23 October 2007
- Genre: Electropop; indietronica
- Length: 5:11
- Label: Astralwerks
- Songwriters: Hot Chip; Todd Rundgren
- Producer: Hot Chip

Hot Chip singles chronology
"My Piano" (2007)	"Shake a Fist" (2007)	"Ready for the Floor" (2008)

"Shake a Fist" is a song by English synth-pop band Hot Chip from their third studio album, Made in the Dark (2008). It was released on 23 October 2007 as the album's lead single. The song was almost included on Hot Chip's second studio album, The Warning (2006).

== Composition ==
Alexis Taylor stated that the lyrics, "I move underwater, I eat what I slaughter", were formed as a result of him "imagining what it would be like to take salvia divinorum", which Joe Goddard had taken at Glastonbury Festival.

== Critical reception ==
"Shake a Fist" was described by The Guardian as a "brooding, industrial, 12-inch introduction to Made in the Dark". Prefix described the song as having "squeaky synths and a laid back bass line playing sidekick to ominous urban jungle drums" with vocals that have "a well defined power dynamic", whilst BBC Music said the song "blends terrific acidic bass [with] jagged snares" and has "shamanic backing vocals". The Irish Times characterised "Shake a Fist" as "a dizzy skyscraper of a track, full to the brim with sonic smarts and tricks yet hard-wired to a snaking, nagging groove".

A sample of Todd Rundgren's voice was used as a result of Al Doyle and Alexis Taylor being fans of Rundgren's third solo album, Something/Anything? (1972). The reception to the sample was mixed; musicOMH called it "delightful", but The Guardian dubbed it "grated". The Toronto Star highlighted "Shake a Fist" as a "top track", and described the song as "more intense and vaguely threatening than anything they've done before", although the use of the Todd Rundgren sample was described as "intrusive".

== Track listing ==
- US limited-edition 12" single
1. "Shake a Fist" – 5:10

== Release history ==
Region	Date	Format	Label	Ref.
United States	23 October 2007	12" single	Astralwerks	
