= Lissy Trullie =

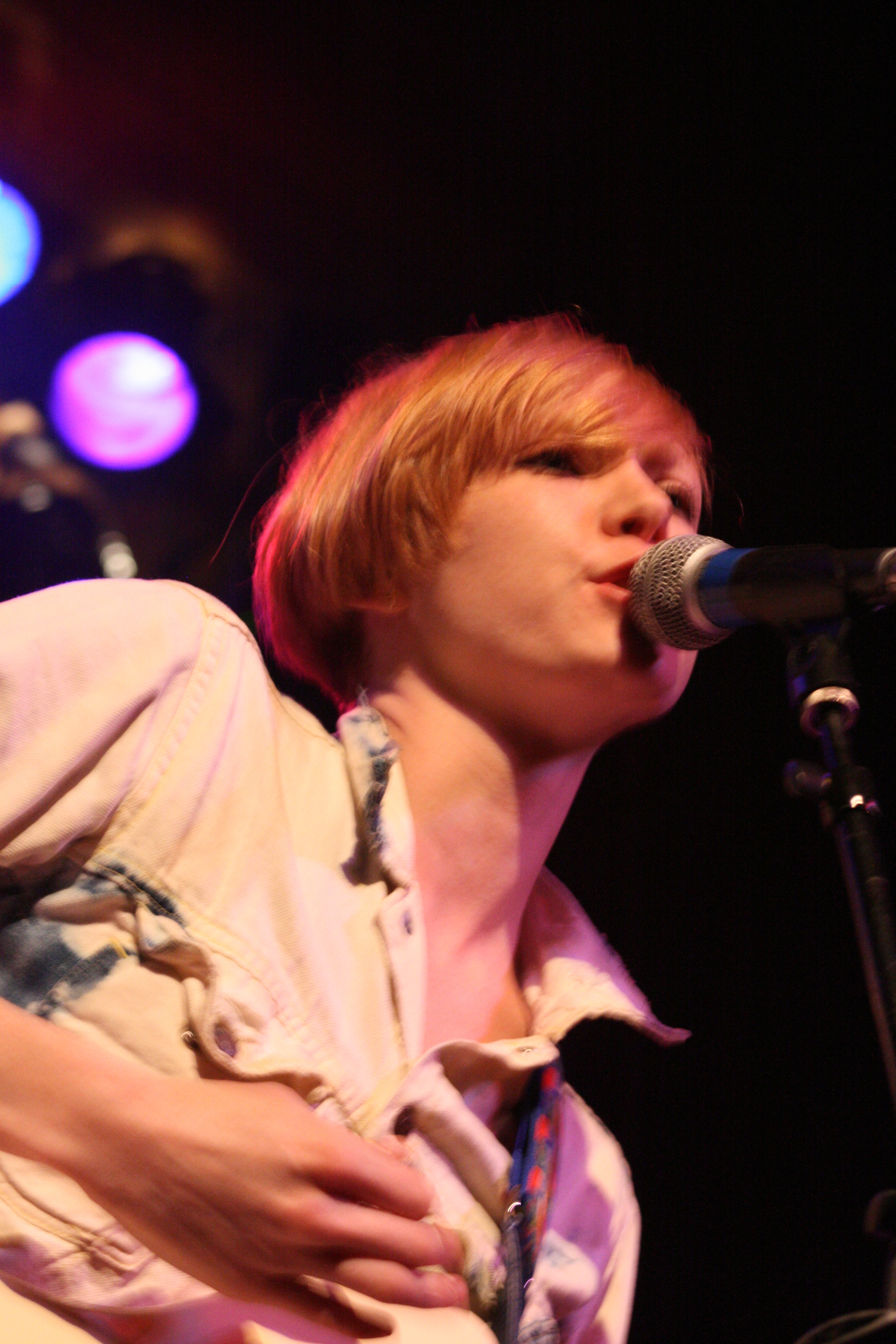
- Trullie at Denver's Bluebird Theater in May 2009.

Background information
- Born: Elizabeth McChesney; March 1, 1984 (age 42); Washington, D.C., US
- Origin: New York City, U.S.
- Genres: Indie rock, post-punk revival
- Instruments: Singing, guitar
- Years active: 2009–present
- Labels: American Myth, Makemine, Wichita, Downtown

Elizabeth McChesney, better known by the stage name Lissy Trullie,(born March 1, 1984), is an American singer-songwriter and former model. She released her debut EP, Self-Taught Learner, in February 2009, and as of 2009, performed with a band named Lissy Trullie. She released her full-length debut album on April 10, 2012. She was previously the lead singer for the rock band Zipper Club.

== Early life ==
Trullie was born in Washington, D.C., and moved to New York City at the age of 16 with her mother. She attended Walnut Hill School, a boarding school in Natick, Massachusetts, with a focus on performing arts. She studied graphic design at Parsons in Greenwich Village and then studied art history at The New School. Trullie performed music at art openings, but soon gravitated towards the downtown rock scene. She spent time working as a model, a dishwasher, a janitor, and a disc jockey at the Beatrice Inn.

== Career ==
=== Solo artist ===
Trullie released her debut EP, Self-Taught Learner, through American Myth Recordings on February 17, 2009. She performed at New York City's Mercury Lounge on February 11, 2009, in anticipation of the CD release. The cover of the EP featured a woman's posterior clad in hot pants, taken from a 1970s pornographic magazine.

Trullie then signed with Wichita Recordings, who released her EP in Europe. Photographer Cass Bird directed the video for her single, "Boy Boy", which was partially filmed in the basement of Lit Lounge on Manhattan's Lower East Side. Actress Chloë Sevigny had a cameo as a merchandise sales girl. In 2009, The Observer grouped Trullie with other singers gaining notice with their distinct fashion, 1980s references, and androgyny, including Lady Gaga, Little Boots, Ladyhawke, and Elly Jackson's synth duo La Roux.

Trullie signed with Downtown Records and re-released her debut EP in October 2009 with four additional songs. Her cover version of Hot Chip's "Ready for the Floor" appeared on the soundtrack of the horror film Jennifer's Body. Trullie made a video for the title single from her EP, "Self-Taught Learner", in October 2009.

Trullie began work on a full-length album in late-2009 with producer Bernard Butler, formerly of the band Suede. Producers John Hill and Dave Sitek of TV On The Radio ended up recording her debut album, Lissy Trullie, in Los Angeles. The album was released in the U.S. on April 10, 2012, by Downtown Records. The debut single, "Madeleine", was made available as a download through RCRD LBL in November 2011, and a video for "It's Only You, Isn't It?" was released in March 2012.

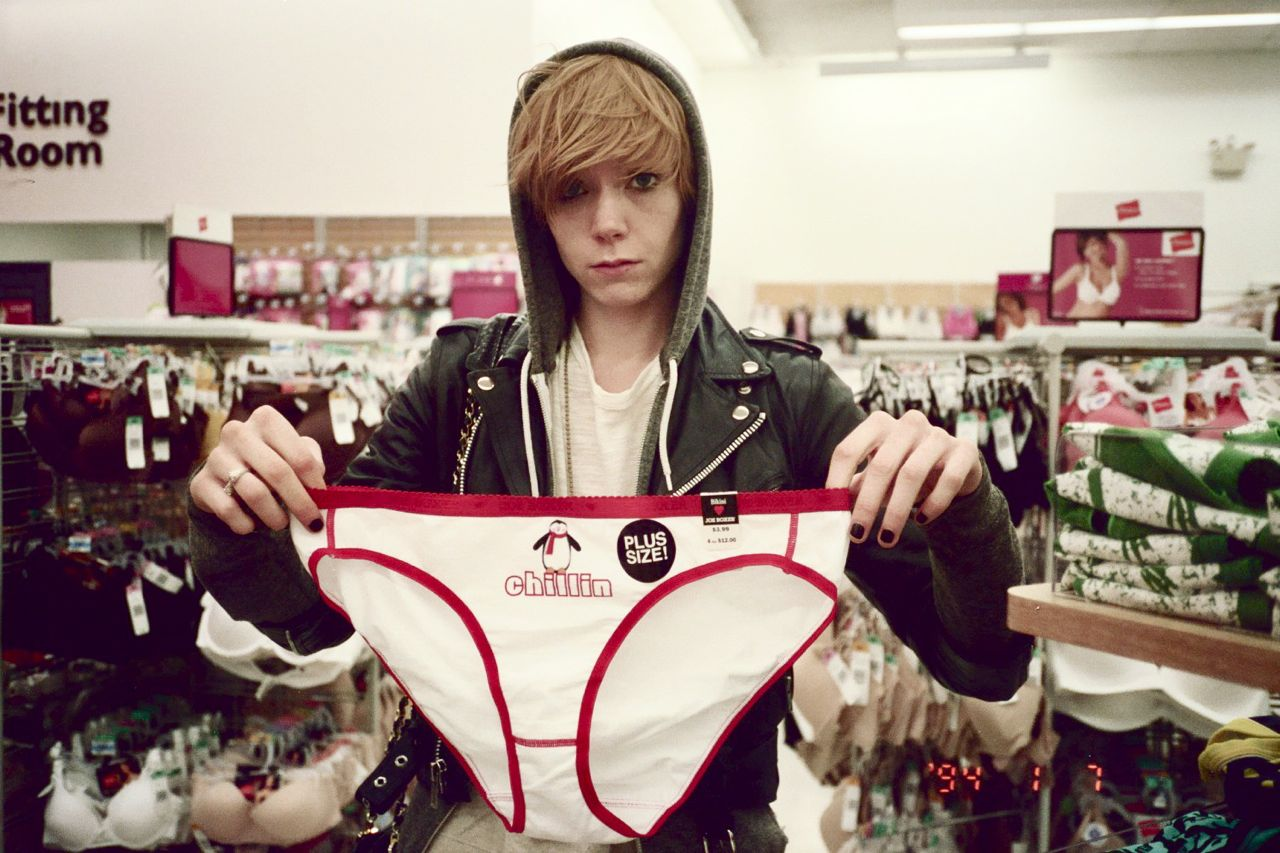
Trullie in 2008.

=== Lissy Trullie band ===
As of 2009, Trullie fronted a four piece rock band, also named Lissy Trullie, which included Trullie on vocals and guitar, Josh Elrod on drums, Eben D’Amico (of Saves the Day) on lead guitar, and Ian Fenger on bass. The group often performed the songs "Just a Friend" by Biz Markie, "Ready for the Floor" by Hot Chip, and Amy Winehouse’s "Rehab" live.

The band toured the U.S. and Europe with The Virgins and Anya Marina in May–June 2009. The tour was cut short when bassist Fenger was hospitalized with swine influenza. The band and crew were quarantined in their hotel in Germany. The group made their U.S. television debut on Last Call with Carson Daly performing "Boy Boy" at the El Rey Theatre in Los Angeles, California on June 3, 2009. They then toured the UK in September–October 2009 with The Cribs and Adam Green.

=== Modeling ===
Trullie has appeared in the fashion magazines Elle, SOMA, and Jalouse. She was the face of actress Chloë Sevigny’s clothing line, and posed in an early portrait by photographer Ryan McGinley in 2002. She was also the inspiration and model for Moses de la Renta's debut line. Trullie stated to Time Out New York that modeling was "just a way for me to make money during college".

Trullie was chosen to represent fashion designer Max Azria for the Hervé Léger Fall 2009 collection. Underground filmmaker Richard Kern photographed the advertisements and directed a video for Trullie's "Ready for the Floor", with the singer wearing clothes from the collection.

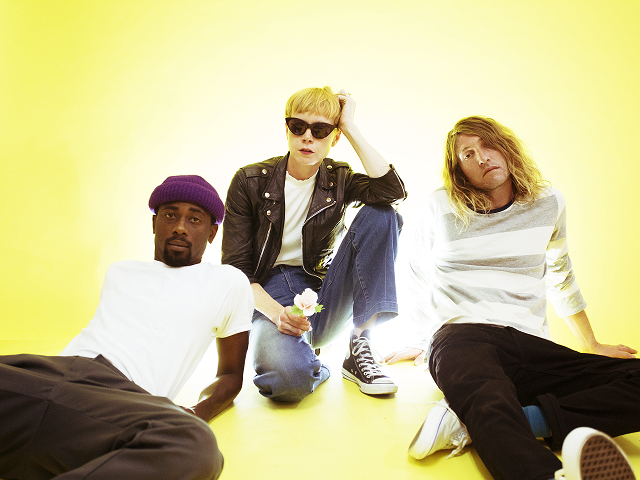
Truillie (center) with Zipper Club in 2016.

=== Zipper Club ===
Trullie and Mason James of Cerebral Ballzy formed Zipper Club, a band produced by James Iha of the Smashing Pumpkins.

== Discography ==
=== Albums ===
- Lissy Trullie (2012), Downtown/Wichita – released April 10, 2012

=== EPs ===
- Self-Taught Learner (2009), American Myth/Wichita/Downtown – debut EP

=== Singles ===
- "Boy Boy" (2009), Makemine – limited edition 7"
- "Self Taught Learner" (2009)
- "Madeleine" (2011)
- "Here" (2018)
