= I Feel Better (Hot Chip song) =

Single by Hot Chip

from the album One Life Stand
- A-side: "I Feel Bonnie" (7"); Remixes (12")
- B-side: "Bear Witness" (7"); "I Feel Bonnie" / Remixes (12")
- Released: 19 April 2010
- Recorded: 2008–09
- Genre: Alternative dance; synth-pop; dance-pop
- Length: 4:42 (album version); 3:35 (single edit)
- Label: Parlophone; Astralwerks; EMI
- Songwriter: Hot Chip
- Producer: Hot Chip

Hot Chip singles chronology
| "One Life Stand" (2010) | "I Feel Better" (2010) | "Night & Day" (2012) |

Music video
- "I Feel Better" on YouTube

"I Feel Better" is the second single released by Hot Chip from their fourth album, One Life Stand. It was released on 19 April 2010. The song was later remixed with Will Oldham.

== Music video ==
The video for "I Feel Better", directed by Peter Serafinowicz and starring Ross Lee as the mysterious figure in white, was described by Pitchfork Media as "re-imag[ining] the British dance pop troupe as a well-manicured and highly choreographed group of dudes [...] who get an unexpected visitor or two during a performance before an audience of swooning young ladies."

In the video, Kyng, Mar'Vaine, Octavian, and Popeye are all members of a hypothetical boy band under the name of Hot Chip, in what appears to be a generic boy band music video as a crowd of mostly women scream on (the actual members of Hot Chip can be seen in the crowd). However, the video quickly devolves into chaos, as a brilliantly glowing bald man in a robe, floating weightlessly, shows up to the concert, interrupting the crowd and stupefying the boys. The boy band and the nameless, floating man square off; however, it quickly becomes apparent that the only tactical moves that Hot Chip know are designed to make teenage female audiences swoon, and are no match for laser beams generated from the man's mouth.

He quickly absorbs the souls of Mar'Vaine, Octavian, and Popeye. During his last stand, Kyng pulls out the most powerful move he knows: the removal of his shirt. While it's super effective vis a vis the female audience, the alien stands unfazed. After absorbing Kyng's soul as well, he takes a moment to release the souls, now under his power. A side effect of absorbing their souls has also granted him similar powers to the members of Hot Chip, and now he too can make female audiences swoon.

Sadly, this new power comes at a cost. A disembodied, floating head (played by Antonio Francis), storms into the performance in a jealous rage, and lasers the boys and some of the audience members, including the actual Hot Chip members. The rest of audience runs away, screaming wildly. When the venue is empty, Francis destroys a "Hot Chip" sign, closes his eyes and laughs evilly, thus ending the video.

In February 2011, music video blog Yes, We've Got a Video! ranked the video at number 4 in their top 30 videos of 2010. The video was described as "savage in its humour and just a little goofy for good measure."

== Track listing ==
=== Digital download ===
Single release
| No. | Title | Length |
|---|---|---|
| 1. | "I Feel Better" | 3:35 |

=== 7" vinyl ===
Side A
| No. | Title | Length |
|---|---|---|
| 1. | "I Feel Bonnie" (featuring Bonnie "Prince" Billy) |

Side B
| No. | Title | Length |
|---|---|---|
| 2. | "Bear Witness" |

=== 12" vinyl ===
Side A
| No. | Title | Length |
|---|---|---|
| 1. | "I Feel Better" (Richard X Remix) |
| 2. | "I Feel Better" (Den Haan Remix) |

Side B
| No. | Title | Length |
|---|---|---|
| 3. | "I Feel Bonnie" (featuring Bonnie "Prince" Billy) |
| 4. | "I Feel Better" (Ill Blu Remix) |

== Chart performance ==
| Chart (2010) | Peak position |
|---|---|
| Israeli Singles Chart | 10 |
| UK Singles Chart | 115 |
| U.S. Billboard Hot Dance Club Play | 21 |
