= Ross Lee =

British comedian, actor and television presenter

- Born: Ross David Lee; 21 August 1973 (age 53); Leeds, Yorkshire, England
- Notable work: Chute!; Ross Lee’s Ghoulies; The Pranker

Comedy career
- Medium: Television, radio

Ross David Lee (born 21 August 1973) is an English comedian, actor, writer, and television presenter. He is best known for his television shows Chute! (2007), Ross Lee's Ghoulies (2008), and The Pranker (2011).

== TV career ==
Lee's first television appearance was on Surf Potatoes, a Channel 4 programme. Lee appeared on the 'Prime Time' segment of Noel's House Party in 1996. He was given 60 seconds of prime time television to do a weather forecast from his bath at home, and the negative reception from the show's studio audience led to fellow Yorkshireman Richard Whiteley being dipped in gunge.

=== Ross Lee's Ghoulies ===
Lee was the host of Ross Lee's Ghoulies, a horror-comedy themed Saturday morning studio-based show which began broadcasting on Sunday 28 September and ended 13 December 2008 on Nickelodeon UK. It aired in two-hour blocks from 10 am until 12 noon, for 13 weeks. Lee appears as an apparent caricature of himself, as well as several different characters in sketches throughout the show.

=== Other TV appearances ===
Prior to Ross Lee's Ghoulies, Lee hosted a similar programme on CBBC entitled Chute!, which included various video clips and songs taken from the BBC archives and off the internet. He also made two appearances on Channel 4's Friday night comedy show Balls of Steel as the World's Worst (Occupation), portraying a taxi driver and a barman respectively. He also provided a voiceover on the DVD of the show. Lee did not appear in the second or third series of Balls of Steel.

Apart from Chute!, Lee appeared in other CBBC shows; once on SMart, and twice on TMi as Mark Rhodes' "friend", and on the last show for Flack's Musical Chairs. He was eliminated in the third round and received pie in his face. He later got his revenge, along with the other contenders, on Sam and Mark. He has also appeared in the Bo' Selecta! Christmas Special "Ho Ho Ho Selecta", and had a minor appearance on Look Around You in Episode Four where he played Andy Gough.

Lee narrated the British version of MTV's strip show-cum-music video show Pants-Off Dance-Off. He also appears in the 2010 music video for "I Feel Better" by Hot Chip, directed by Peter Serafinowicz.

After taking a break from presenting shows on children's TV, Ross starred in his own hidden camera show The Pranker on BBC Three, in which he pranks unsuspecting members of the general public. The Pranker ran for only one series with six episodes from 14 July - 18 August 2011.

In 2015, Ross starred in the first series of The Keith Lemon Sketch Show as numerous characters including Ronnie Wood and Batman and Robin. He then returned to the show in its second series supporting his lifelong friend, Leigh Francis (Keith Lemon).

== Radio career ==
=== TBFM Online ===
On 6 February 2014, it was announced that Lee had joined the internet radio station TBFM Online as a DJ, and would be presenting a weekly one-hour show on the station.
