= One Life Stand (song) =

Single by Hot Chip

from the album One Life Stand
- B-side: "Build a House"
- Released: 30 November 2009
- Recorded: 2007–08
- Genre: Indietronica; alternative dance; house; synth-pop
- Length: 5:21 (album version); 3:17 (single edit)
- Label: Parlophone; Astralwerks
- Songwriter: Hot Chip
- Producer: Hot Chip

Hot Chip singles chronology
"One Pure Thought" (2008)	"One Life Stand" (2009)	"I Feel Better" (2010)

"One Life Stand" is a single by Hot Chip from their 2010 album of the same name. It was released digitally through the iTunes Store on 30 November 2009. The physical release date was 1 February 2010. Vocalist Alexis Taylor said of the song, "I'm talking about turning a one-night stand into someone's whole life and I think that's quite a nice thing to say".

== Music video ==
Pitchfork Media reported that Hot Chip had announced through Twitter that they were planning to film a music video to accompany the song on 30 November 2009. The video shows the band performing in a reflection of a silver ball on the ceiling of a square room, shot with a rotating camera. Matthew Richardson of Prefix Magazine stated that "there doesn't really seem to be some kind of conceptual basis" for the video "but Hot Chip manages to be entertaining all the same as they horse around in a square room" looking "a little like dorks, but they also look cool doing it". The video was shot by Dutch movie maker Roel Wouters. About half of the video was shot by the bandmembers themselves using handycams.

== Critical reception ==
Ben Baglin of FACT Magazine stated that "within seconds of hearing [the song], you know they’ve basically struck gold" and described the song as having an "outwardly coarse, toytown aesthetic" that "masks the incredible production and musicianship at work [...] like the slinky keyboard harmonies and snapclaps in the verses, the way the chiming, 'Josephine'-esque guitars lock in for the chorus". The Guardian journalist, Louis Pattison, described the lyrics "Tell me where you've been to/ Nowhere that you shouldn't do" as being given by Alexis Taylor like orders from "your dad, in his car, wearing his pyjamas" and contrasted it with the chorus which he described as "a sweet-hearted hymn to monogamy, sung by a teddy bear who found honey at the heart of the rave."

== Track listing ==
=== iTunes release ===
1. "One Life Stand" – 5:21

=== Play release ===
1. "One Life Stand" – 5:21
2. "Build a House" – 4:13

=== Digital single release ===
1. "One Life Stand" – 3:17

=== Promotional 7" release ===
1. "One Life Stand"
2. "Do Not Wait" (non-album track)

== Chart performance ==
Following the digital release of the single on 1 February 2010, "One Life Stand" entered the UK Singles Chart on 7 February 2010, at a current peak of #41.

Chart (2010)	Peak position
Switzerland Airplay (Schweizer Hitparade)	99
UK Singles (OCC)	41
