= Zipper Club =

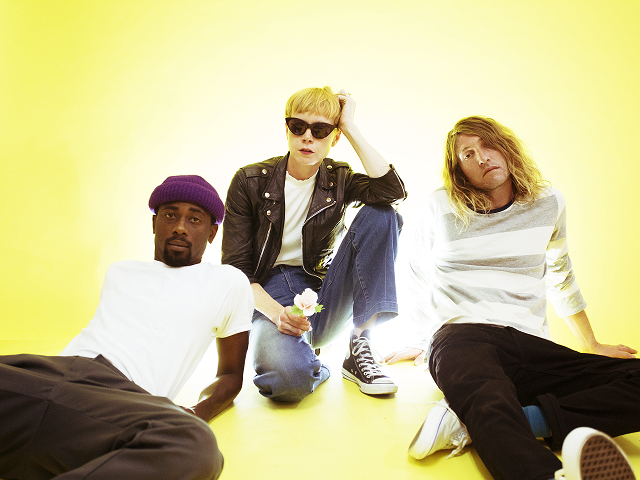

Background information
- Origin: Los Angeles, California
- Labels: Epic
- Members: Mason James (guitar); Lissy Trullie (vocals); Damar Davis (drums)
- Website: zipperclub.com

Zipper Club was an American musical group from Los Angeles, California. The group was formed by members Mason James of Cerebral Ballzy and solo artist Lissy Trullie.

== History ==
Zipper Club was initially formed from the writing of Mason James of Cerebral Ballzy. After touring internationally for many years, James left the group to start a new project. He wanted to explore new instrumentations and musical styles so he began writing songs that were inspired by the diverse musical taste of his childhood. He spent the next couple years honing his sound in his bedroom.

James met up with Trullie to write and record the rest of the record, coming up with the name Zipper Club in the process. Prior to Zipper Club, Trullie was a solo artist fronting the group Lissy Trullie in addition to studying art and film theory at Parsons and The New School.

James and Trullie met with James Iha in Los Angeles to produce some of the songs for the band. The duo has referred to Iha as a "subtle mad scientist" and is the only producer they wanted to work with. James and Trullie continued to work with Iha as they recorded what would be the group's debut LP. Zipper Club is currently managed by David Bason.

== Discography ==
=== Singles ===
Title	Year	Peak chart positions	Album
Title	Year	US Alt	Album
"Going the Distance"	2016	29	Non-album single
