= Rubbed Out =

Studio album by Alexis Taylor
- Released: 13 October 2008
- Recorded: Alexis Taylor's Home, 2008
- Genre: Folktronica, indietronica, neo soul
- Length: 39:56
- Label: Treader
- Producer: Alexis Taylor

Rubbed Out is the first solo album by the leader of British indie electronic band Hot Chip, Alexis Taylor. It was released on October 13, 2008 in the UK. According to Taylor, he "just made it there wasn't any thinking behind it really." The album was "tailored in places, planes, hotel rooms and at home."

== Critical reception ==
Professional ratings
Review scores
Source	Rating
Pitchfork Media	(6.7/10)

The reception to the album was generally favourable. Pitchfork described the album as "a refreshingly simple collection of tender ballads and quirky set pieces" while "Taylor's voice hovers over rich keyboard smears or bounces lightly over tripping guitars, accented with little bells and whistles." Although, it was noted that the album tended to wander through its "confused final third." Luke Lewis, a blogger for NME, said Taylor's cover of Paul McCartney's "Coming Up" enabled "the simple beauty of the chorus... to breathe more freely," while "Taylor's voice is perfectly capable of raising goosebumps even without the sleek digital backdrop [of Hot Chip]."

== Track listing ==
1. "Fireworks" – 1:47
2. "Plastic Man" – 2:34
3. "Coming Up" – 2:36
4. "Baby" – 3:17
5. "Girl" – 3:39
6. "I Thought This Was Ours" – 5:06
7. "I'm Not a Robber" – 3:38
8. "Collector's Item" – 2:04
9. "What Good is Love?" – 5:12
10. "Musical Food" – 3:05
11. "O Lord" – 0:31
12. "I Love My Home" – 1:39
13. "I'm Juan" – 1:21
14. "Ruffles" – 3:44
15. "The Big Drums of Chwodes" – 2:35

All tracks written by Alexis Taylor with the exception of "Coming Up".

=== Personnel ===
- Alexis Taylor – vocals, instrumentation, mixing and production (drums and glockenspiel mixed and produced by Rupert Clervaux on tracks 4, 5, and 6)
- Rupert Clervaux – drums, glockenspiel on tracks 4, 5, and 6
- Frauke Stegmann - artwork

== Song notes ==
- "Coming Up" is a cover of the Paul McCartney song from his 1980 third solo effort, McCartney II.
