= Seven Sisters (Beta Radio album) =

- Seven Sisters by Beta Radio

Studio album by Beta Radio
- Released: April 21, 2010
- Recorded: 2009–2010
- Genre: Folk, indie folk, Americana
- Length: 38:53
- Producer: Benjamin Mabry, Brent Holloman

Beta Radio chronology
Seven Sisters (2010)	Colony of Bees (2014)

Beta Radio's self-released debut album, Seven Sisters combines studio recorded material with home recorded tracks that were captured in Beta Radio guitarist Holloman's spare bedroom and living room. Seven Sisters was originally conceived as an EP, but over the course of a few months morphed in to a full-length recording after the band left the recording studio.

In 2011, Beta Radio released a special edition vinyl LP with the addition of two tracks recorded after the original studio sessions. The additional two tracks were composed and recorded for the CW television series Hart of Dixie.

== Track listing ==
1. Either Way – 2:16
2. Darden Road – 4:20
3. Where Losers Do – 3:24
4. Hello Lovely – 2:01
5. Brother, Sister – 5:49
6. Khima – 2:23
7. Borderline – 3:42
8. Highlight on the Hill – 3:23
9. Pleiades – 2:54
10. A Place for Me – 5:27
11. Return to Darden Road – 3:21

Deluxe Edition Only

12. The Man Grows – 3:30
13. Widow at the Wake – 4:41
