= About Group (band) =

English band

- Origin: London, England
- Genre: Indie rock
- Years active: 2009–present
- Labels: Treader; Domino Recording Company
- Spinoff of: Hot Chip, This Heat, Spiritualized
- Members: John Coxon; Pat Thomas; Alexis Taylor
- Past members: Charles Hayward
- Website: www.dominorecordco.us/artists/about-group//

About Group is an English improvisational rock band established in 2009, formed by members of Hot Chip, This Heat, and Spiritualized. Based in London, the group is known for making albums without practicing the songs before or playing together first.

== Musical history ==
About Group made its first album in 2009, released on John Coxon's own Treader label. Although having never played before, they recorded the album in a day and debuted it at Ornette Coleman's Meltdown festival at the Queen Elizabeth Hall.

In February 2011, About Group announced its plans for a second album, called "Start & Complete", to be released on Domino Records. Similar to their first album, "Start & Complete" was also recorded in one day, in the Abbey Road Studios. It was released to mixed to positive reviews.

"Between the Walls" was About Group's third album, released in July 2013 by Domino Records, to more positive reviews. It was the final album before Hayward left the band.

== Discography ==
=== Albums ===
Title	Year	Format	Label
About	2009	CD	Treader
Start & Complete	2011	LP, CD	Domino
Between the Walls	2013	LP, CD	Domino

=== Singles and EPs ===
Title	Year	Format	Label
You're No Good	2011	12-inch EP, CD	Domino
"Don't Worry"	2011	CD	Domino
Something New and Wonderful	2011	7-inch EP	Domino
All Is Not Lost	2013	12-inch EP, Digital	Domino
