= Beautiful Thing (Alexis Taylor album) =

Studio album by Alexis Taylor
- Released: 20 April 2018
- Length: 47:45
- Label: Domino
- Producer: Alexis Taylor; Tim Goldsworthy

Alexis Taylor chronology
Listen With(out) Piano (2017)	Beautiful Thing (2018)

Professional ratings
Aggregate scores
Source	Rating
AnyDecentMusic?	6.7/10
Metacritic	71/100
Review scores
Source	Rating
AllMusic	3.5/5 stars
Clash	7/10
DIY	3/5 stars
Dork	4/5 stars
Drowned in Sound	6/10
The Line of Best Fit	7/10
Loud and Quiet	7/10
MusicOMH	4/5 stars
NME	3/5 stars
Pitchfork	6.8/10

Beautiful Thing is the fourth studio album by British musician Alexis Taylor. It was released on 20 April 2018, under Domino Recording Company.

The album was produced by Tim Goldsworthy.

== Singles ==
On 22 March 2018, Alexis released the single "Oh Baby". It was produced by Joe Goddard, and features Alexis' Hot Chip band members.

Alexis Taylor said of the single:

"[Oh Baby] is an exuberant love song, with a nod to the music I love by the likes of Alex Chilton and Paul McCartney. It was produced by Joe Goddard and features John Coxon on guitar and some Hot Chip bandmembers playing on it too. I wrote it in about the time it takes to listen to it, and the finished performance was recorded live in the studio.

== Critical reception ==
Beautiful Thing was met with "generally favorable" reviews from critics. At Metacritic, which assigns a weighted average rating out of 100 to reviews from mainstream publications, this release received an average score of 71, based on 20 reviews. Aggregator Album of the Year gave the release a 71 out of 100 based on a critical consensus of 20 reviews.

== Track listing ==
Beautiful Thing track listing
No.	Title	Length
1.	"Dreaming Another Life"	5:22
2.	"Beautiful Thing"	5:35
3.	"Deep Cut"	3:25
4.	"Roll on Blank Tapes"	5:04
5.	"Suspicious of Me"	3:31
6.	"A Hit Song"	5:24
7.	"Oh Baby"	3:25
8.	"There's Nothing to Hide"	6:16
9.	"I Feel You"	4:26
10.	"Out of Time"	5:17

== Personnel ==
Musicians

- Alexis Taylor – lead vocalist, drums, guitar, piano
- Charles Ballas – synthesizer
- Al Doyle – bass
- Terry Edwards – trumpet
- John Coxon – guitar
- Neil Hagerty – backing vocals, guitar
- Sarah Jones – drums
- Rob Smoughton – drums
- Leo Taylor – drums
- Prudence Taylor – backing vocals
- Susumu Mukai – ebo

Production

- Charles Ballas – engineer
- Tim Goldsworthy – producer, engineer
- Bruno Ellingham – engineer, mixer
- Shuta Shinoda – engineer
- Alex Wharton – mastering
