= Colony of Bees =

- Colony of Bees by Beta Radio

Studio album by Beta Radio
- Released: November 18, 2014
- Recorded: 2013–2014
- Genre: Folk, indie folk, Americana
- Length: 41:56
- Producer: Benjamin Mabry, Brent Holloman

Beta Radio chronology
Seven Sisters (Deluxe Edition) (2011)	Colony of Bees (2014)

Beta Radio's self-released second album, Colony of Bees was recorded largely in the home studios of band members Benjamin Mabry and Brent Holloman and marks a subtle departure in style from their debut Seven Sisters. The record features a fuller sound than its predecessor thanks in part to the lengthier recording period and accomplished personnel appearing on the record. Of note is respected composer/arranger/violinist Rob Moose (Sufjan Stevens, Bon Iver, Ben Folds, Arcade Fire).

== Track listing ==
1. Take My Photograph – 3:31
2. East of Tennessee – 3:35
3. I Am Mine – 4:04
4. Come on Make It Right Once – 3:04
5. First Began – 4:44
6. Vera – 1:18
7. Sitting Room – 4:09
8. On the Frame – 3:39
9. Kilimanjaro – 4:35
10. White Fawn – 3:06
11. Here Too Far – 0:55
12. Monument – 5:18
