= Beta Radio =

American rock band

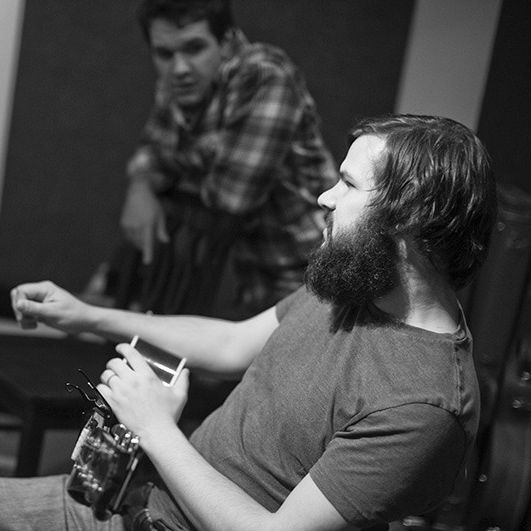
- Brent Holloman (right) and Ben Mabry of Beta Radio

Background information
- Origin: Wilmington, North Carolina
- Genres: Folk; indie folk; Americana; chamber pop; alternative country; minimal
- Years active: 2001–present
- Website: betaradio.com

Beta Radio is an American band from Wilmington, North Carolina. The group consists of Ben Mabry (vocals, guitar, rhodes, piano, glockenspiel, and harmonium) and Brent Holloman (guitar, vocals, banjo, rhodes, piano, glockenspiel, and bass). Stylistically, their music features an amalgam of folk, indie, chamber pop, rock and Americana influences.

== Recording history ==
=== Seven Sisters ===
Beta Radio's self-released debut Seven Sisters employs a combination of studio recorded material as well as home recorded tracks captured in guitarist Holloman's spare bedroom and living room. Seven Sisters was originally conceived as an EP, but when Mabry and Holloman left the studio in the winter of 2009, they had more songs than the typical EP, but less than a standard release. Out of money, they made the decision to record more material on their own, despite the fact that neither knew how to properly engineer or produce. By the following spring they had an additional four songs recorded in “Holloman’s house with borrowed equipment” and released the debut in April 2010. Much of the success Seven Sisters has achieved has come at a grassroots level and has largely built on exposure received from internet radio stations Spotify and Pandora Radio.

=== Work in television and Seven Sisters deluxe release ===
In 2011, two Beta Radio songs were featured on the first two episodes of the American medical-drama television series Hart of Dixie. The songs were written after the band was approached by the producers of the show who were looking for two waltzes that actress Jaime King and others would perform to on screen. The band also appeared on screen performing in the pilot episode with Holloman's wife Amanda and friend David Pray backing. The two waltzes were subsequently included in a 2011 special edition vinyl release of Seven Sisters.

=== Colony of Bees ===
On November 18, 2014, Beta Radio released Colony of Bees, a record that was recorded over a span of two years and made in multiple recording studios. The songs on Colony of Bees show a subtle stylistic departure from their previous work, they are more expansive and layered, as opposed to the more minimalistic arrangements found on Seven Sisters. The fuller sound featured on Colony of Bees is due in part to the lengthier recording period and accomplished personnel appearing on the record. Of note is composer/arranger/violinist Rob Moose (Sufjan Stevens, Bon Iver, Ben Folds, Arcade Fire). In February 2015, online news aggregator Huffington Post called Colony of Bees "sonically lovely." The record was included in the site's top ten roundup of its 40 "Best Albums of 2014."

=== The Songs the Season Brings, Vols. 1-4 ===
Starting in 2011, the band released a series of four holiday EPs entitled, The Songs the Season Brings, Vol.1 (2011), Vol.2 (2012), Vol.3 (2013) & Vol.4 (2015). These releases are "a collection of classic and original Christmas songs to help celebrate the holiday season [and were] made in various environments over the two months before Christmas - recorded in the studio, at home in bedrooms, and in closets of family members.” Every year, the EPs were given away for free via their official Bandcamp and NoiseTrade sites and in 2015, were compiled together into one full-length album.

=== Ancient Transition and Year of Love ===
On September 14, 2018, Beta Radio released Ancient Transition, their third full-length record and first for music label Nettwerk Music Group. In June 2021, Beta Radio released an LP titled Year of Love. The album features The National drummer Bryan Devendorf and past Bon Iver member CJ Camerieri.

== Discography ==
=== Studio albums ===
- Seven Sisters (2010)
- Colony of Bees (2014)
- The Songs the Season Brings, Vols. 1-4 (2015)
- Ancient Transition (2018)
- Year Of Love (2021)
- Waiting For The End To Come (2024)

=== Extended plays ===
- Way of Love (2020)
