= Ready for the Floor =

2008 single by Hot Chip

Single by Hot Chip

from the album Made in the Dark
- B-side: "Bubbles They Bounce"; "My Brother Is Watching Me"
- Released: 28 January 2008
- Genre: Alternative dance; dance-pop
- Length: 3:51
- Label: EMI
- Songwriter: Hot Chip
- Producer: Hot Chip

Hot Chip singles chronology
"Shake a Fist" (2007)	"Ready for the Floor" (2008)	"One Pure Thought" (2008)

"Ready for the Floor" is a song by English synth-pop band Hot Chip, and the second single from their 2008 album Made in the Dark. It was released on 28 January 2008 and peaked at number six on the UK Singles Chart in February 2008. It was nominated for a Grammy Award for Best Dance Recording.

== Composition ==
Alexis Taylor gave an explanation about the use of the line, "You're my number one guy" in the song, and also explained how it visually impacted the music video (Taylor is dressed as the Joker):

"I really like this line in the first Batman film, not the very first one that was made, but the first Tim Burton Batman film. Jack Palance tells Jack Nicholson, 'You are my number one guy.' And it's a completely false statement. The very next scene is Jack Nicholson being set up and about to be killed off by Jack Palance's character. Then he survives all of this and he comes back as the Joker and he kills Jack Palance. And later on he quotes Jack Palance, he says it to his goon, Bob the Goon, 'You are my number one guy.' He says it in a really funny, mimicking way. I quite like it. He's not only mimicking the character in the film, he's also mimicking Jack Palance as an actor. He's mimicking his melodramatic style. That line has always stuck with me."

Some media reports incorrectly asserted that Hot Chip had originally written the song "Ready for the Floor" for Australian singer Kylie Minogue. Alexis Taylor explained: "It started because someone asked me if we would ever write for Kylie. I said that we'd been asked to write for her but we'd never got round to it. And I said if we had to give her one of our songs, Ready for the Floor would probably be the most suitable. From that, I got misquoted. We didn't write Ready for the Floor for Kylie, didn't send it to her and she never heard it."

== Critical reception ==
"Ready for the Floor" was generally well received by music critics and charted well, peaking at number six on the UK Singles Chart in February 2008. Drowned in Sound gave the single a score of 9/10 and described it as one that "might not sell a million records" but that it could make "'household name' an achievable status". Drowned in Sound said that it had "a chord change that uplifts the soul" and that the song was "a slice of sweetly insistent ‘80s Italo-house lite" but also said it could also be described "as a piece of sophisticated mainstream pop". MusicOMH said that "Ready for the Floor" bore an "undoubted resemblance [...] at first glance" to "Boy from School" but said it was "more subtle in its use of brushed electro beats and clever countermelodies".

A number of reviews discussed the style of Alexis Taylor’s vocals. MusicOMH described his vocals as "quietly dreamy" whilst Drowned in Sound said there was "something incredibly sweet about the way that Alexis Taylor croons 'you’re my number one guy'" and described his vocals as "full of nerdy sexual chocolate." Boomkat.com said that "Ready for the Floor (Smoothed Out on an R&B Tip version)", sounds "more in line with Morr-ish poptronica than R. Kelly" and was "undoubtedly tinted with a slightly more downbeat hue than the album and radio edits." Boomkat.com also commented on the B-side, "My Brother Is Watching Me", describing it as "a slow burning, exceptionally quiet electronic ballad".

The song was also well received in the United States, where it was nominated for the Grammy Award for Best Dance Recording in December 2008. Pitchfork named it as the third best track of 2008 and the 76th best song of the 2000s.

== Music video ==
The music video for "Ready for the Floor", directed by Nima Nourizadeh in his fourth and to date final video with the band, was described by Pitchfork Media as being "all about duality", showing Alexis Taylor "going back and forth (and sometimes split down the middle) between mild-mannered tech wiz and, basically, the Joker."

== Track listings ==
Enhanced CD

1. "Ready for the Floor"
2. "Shake a Fist" (Diplo's Noise of Art Remix)
3. "Bubbles They Bounce"
4. "Ready for the Floor" (Soulwax Dub)
5. "Ready for the Floor" (music video)

7-inch single 1

- A: "Ready for the Floor" (radio edit)
- B: "Bubbles They Bounce"

7-inch single 2

- A: "Ready for the Floor" (Smoothed Out on an R&B tip Version)
- B: "My Brother Is Watching Me"

== Charts ==
=== Weekly charts ===
Chart (2008)	Peak position
Australia (ARIA)	92
Austria (Ö3 Austria Top 40)	73
Belgium (Ultratip Bubbling Under Flanders)	2
Belgium (Ultratip Bubbling Under Wallonia)	17
Europe (Eurochart Hot 100)	19
Ireland (IRMA)	22
Scottish Singles Sales (Official Charts)	7
Switzerland Airplay (Schweizer Hitparade)	76
UK Singles (Official Charts)	6
UK Dance (Official Charts)	40

=== Year-end charts ===
Chart (2008)	Position
UK Singles (OCC)	110

== Certifications ==
Region	Certification	Certified units/sales
United Kingdom (BPI)	Silver	200,000^{‡}
^{‡} Sales+streaming figures based on certification alone.
