= Alexis Taylor =

British musician

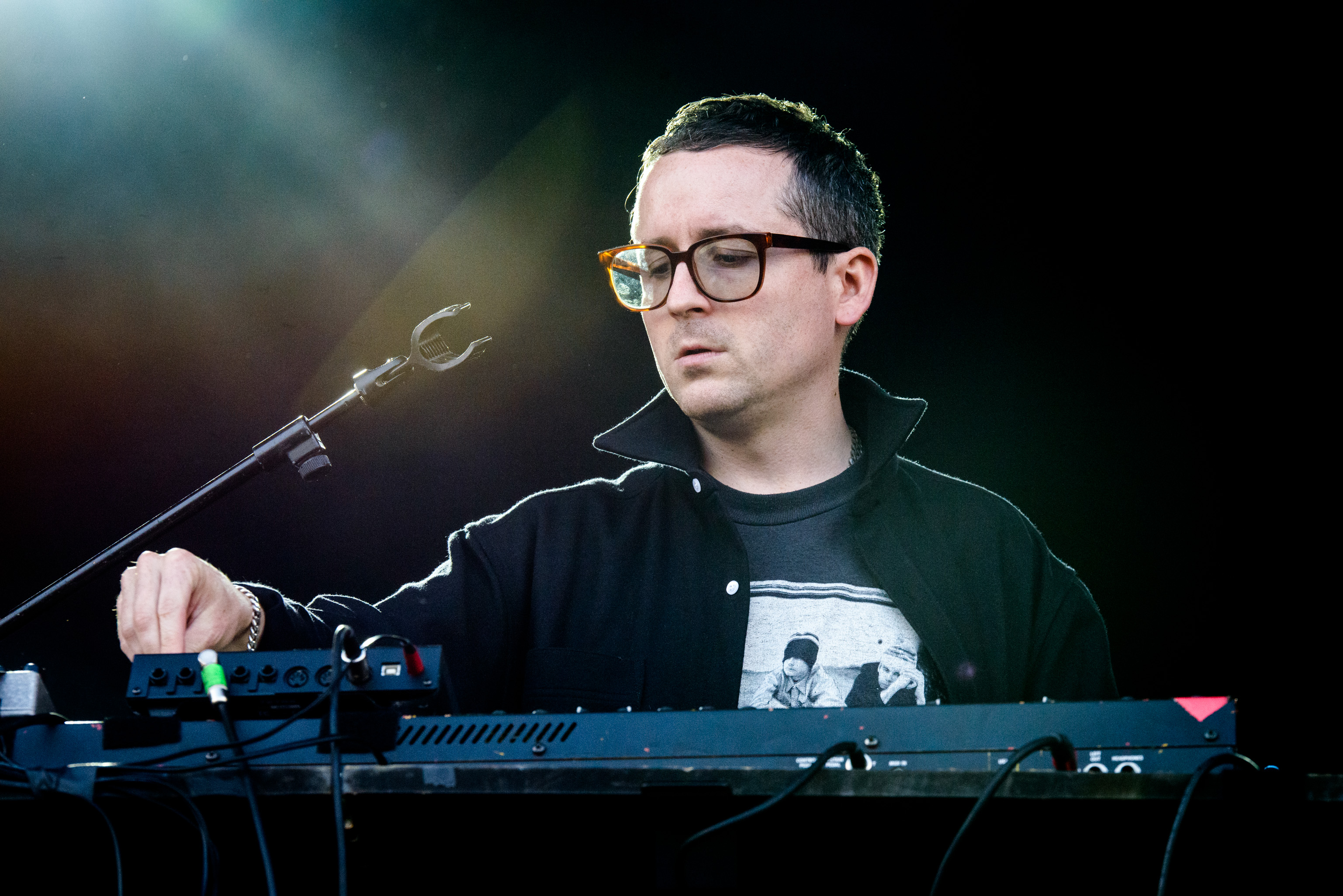
- Taylor performing in September 2015

Background information
- Born: 20 April 1980 (age 46); London, England
- Genres: Electronic; synth-pop; alternative dance
- Occupations: Singer; songwriter; musician
- Instruments: Vocals; keyboards; drums; percussion; guitar
- Years active: 2000–present
- Member of: Hot Chip; About Group
- Website: Alexis Taylor

Alexis Taylor (born 20 April 1980) is an English singer, songwriter, and musician. He is best known as the lead vocalist, keyboardist, and guitarist of the synth-pop band Hot Chip. He is also the keyboardist of the band About Group and has released solo material.

== Early life ==
Alexis Taylor was born in London on 20 April 1980, the son of a Greek mother and an English father. His mother is a psychoanalyst, while his father is a professor of English at a university.

== Career ==
Taylor formed Hot Chip with Joe Goddard while at Elliot Secondary School in the Putney area of London. He studied English at Jesus College, Cambridge from 1999 to 2002, during which time Hot Chip played a variety of gigs (with various line-ups) at Cambridge's live music venues. In 2007, Taylor and Hot Chip produced a two-song album, Doubleshaw, as Booji Boy High under the pseudonyms Georgios Panayiotou and Mother Markzbow. The name Booji Boy comes from the character created by Devo.

After the release of Hot Chip's second album The Warning, Taylor released his first solo album, Rubbed Out, in 2008. The same year, he formed the improvisational quartet About Group with Spring Heel Jack's John Coxon, pianist Pat Thomas and former This Heat drummer Charles Hayward.

A solo EP, Nayim from the Halfway Line, was released on the Domino label in 2012, and in 2014 the same label released the album Await Barbarians.

In June 2016, Taylor released Piano, the follow-up album to Await Barbarians. An accompanying album, Listen With(out) Piano, was released in March 2017. It features re-works of tracks from Piano with other musicians; both albums can be played separately or at the same time.

In February 2018, Taylor announced his new album, Beautiful Thing. The album was produced by Tim Goldsworthy, co-founder of DFA Records.

In 2021, Taylor released the album Silence, which was preceded by the singles "House of the Truth", "Death of Silence" and "Dying in Heaven". In November 2023, he released the single "Wedding Song (Palace)".

== Discography ==
=== Albums ===
- Rubbed Out (2008)
- Await Barbarians (2014)
- Piano (2016)
- Beautiful Thing (2018)
- Silence (2021)
- Paris in the Spring (2026)
