= Stacey (Take You Higher) =

2026 single by XO

Single by XO

from the EP Need to Know
- Released: 4 September 2026
- Genre: Pop
- Length: 3:03
- Label: Polydor
- Songwriters: Uzoechi Emenike; Aminata Kabba; Michelle O'Faith; Floyd Dyce
- Producers: Goldcrush; Willow Kayne

XO singles chronology
"Clique" (2026)	"Stacey (Take You Higher)" (2026)

Music video
- "Stacey (Take You Higher)" on YouTube

"Stacey (Take You Higher)" is a song recorded by British girl group XO. It was released on 4 September 2026 through Polydor Records as the third single from the group's second extended play, Need to Know (2026). The song was written for the group by MNEK, Kabba and Michelle O'Faith, with Goldcrush and Willow Kayne handling the production.

The song interpolates the 1992 rave song "Let Me Be Your Fantasy" by Baby D, while the lyrical content revolves around a crush that is interested in somebody else, Stacey, with XO affirming that they are better than her. Critics praised the song, with Fame dubbing it a "memorable piece of pop", while Notion complimented the track for its "sheer intensity" and 2010s nostalgia.

== Background and release ==
After releasing single "Hotline" in April 2026, XO announced the release details for their second extended play (EP), Need to Know. The release of "Clique" as the second single from the project followed on 3 July. They began promoting the EP at a London residency at Colours in Hoxton, as well as appearances at All Points East and G-A-Y, where they performed "Stacey (Take You Higher)" prior to its official release. It was eventually released on 4 September. They promoted the release with a launch night at London nightclub Heaven the following night.

== Composition and lyrics ==
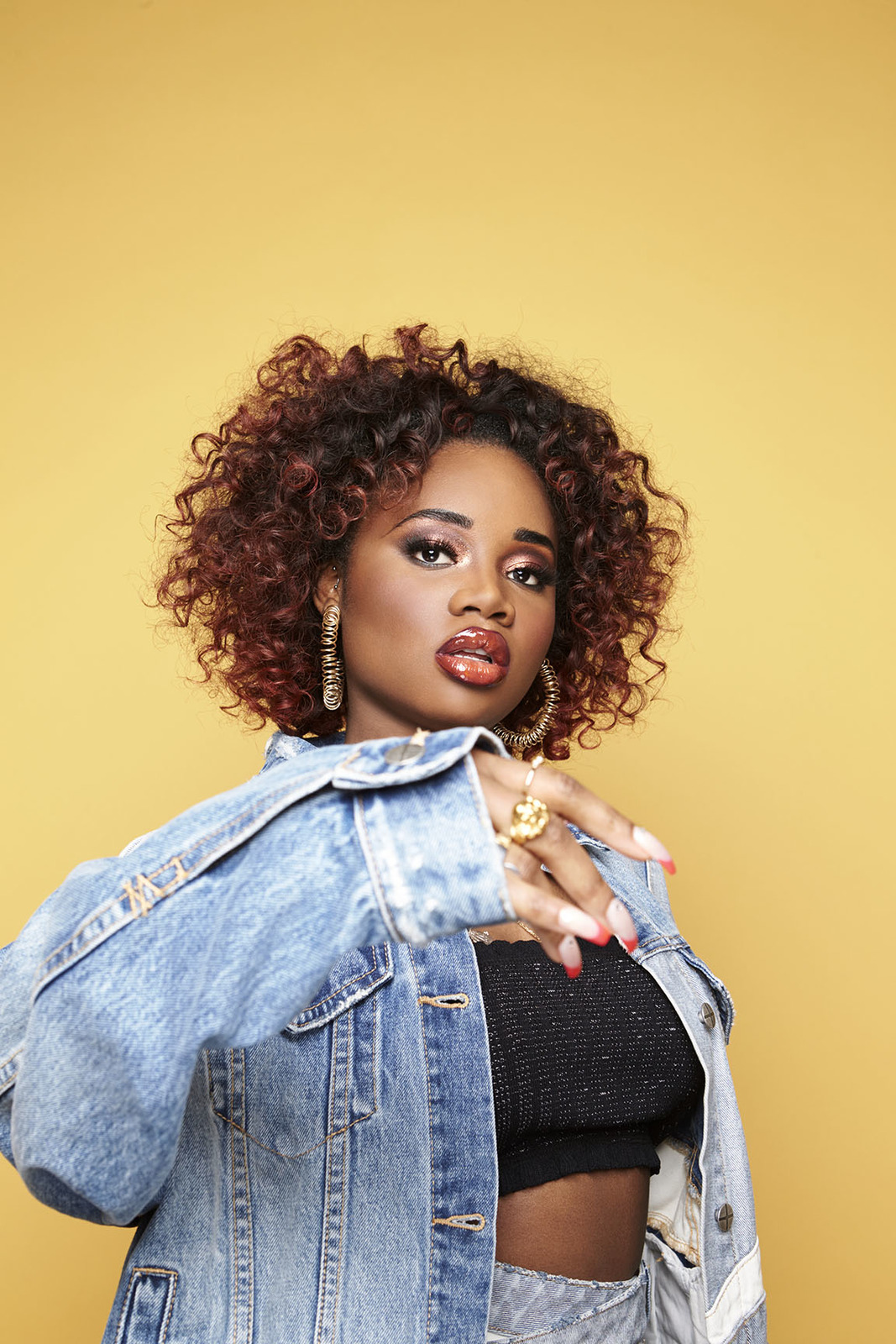
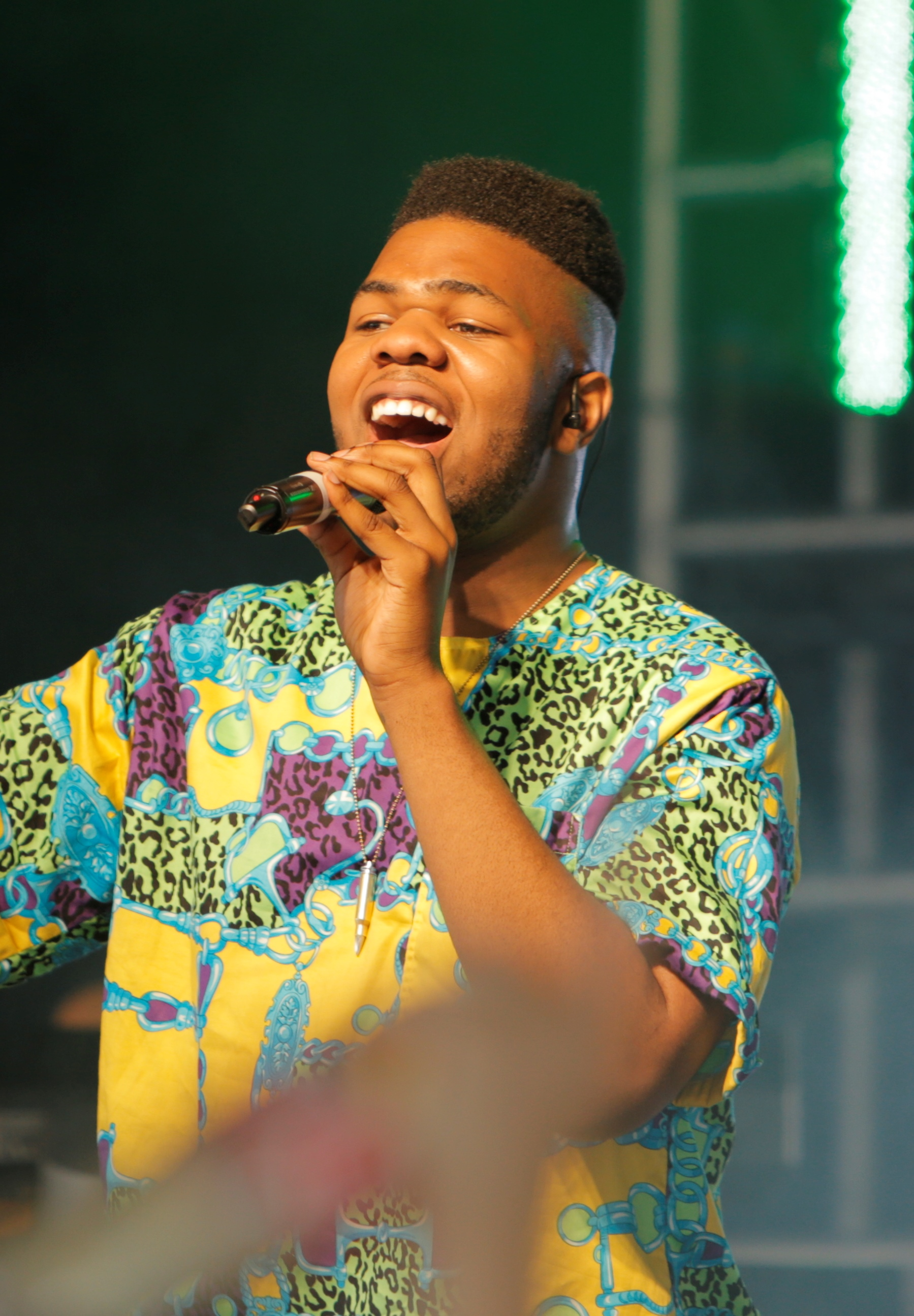
Kabba and MNEK are two of the co-writers on "Stacey (Take You Higher)".

Described by Notion as a pop song, "Stacey (Take You Higher)" was co-written for the group by MNEK, Kabba and Michelle O'Faith. It also credits Floyd Dyce as a writer since it interpolates the 1992 rave song "Let Me Be Your Fantasy" by Baby D. The lyrical content explores feeling jealous over a crush pining for someone else called Stacey. The track sees XO "argue the case" for why they are better than her. Fame noted that the song did not follow the typical route of having a rivalry with the other woman. Instead of expressing being heartbroken, the lyrics see them empower themselves.

== Critical reception ==
Ciaran Howley, writing for Notion, found "Stacey (Take You Higher)" relatable and praised the track for its "sheer intensity". He felt the song was "pure pop fun" and was reminded of 2010s music, complimenting XO for the nostalgia shown on the track. Howley added that the song provided "exactly the levity we need right now". Fame's Vee Dee also complimented the song and felt that it was "more than another single in [the EP's] rollout", instead finding it to be "a memorable piece of pop". Dee also hoped the song would elevate XO's career. InCeleb called it a "inspiring and highly confident and powerful track to encourage strength and girl-power inside all of their listeners". Dork's Felicity Newton billed it a "tongue in cheek tale of heartbreak, solidarity and sabotage at the hands of the mysterious Stacey" and appreciated the sample of "Let Me Be Your Fantasy". Rolling Stone also dubbed the song "excellent".

== Credits and personnel ==
Credits adapted from Spotify.

- Summer Askew – vocals
- Shali Bordoni – vocals
- Zoe Miller – vocals
- Emmy Statham – vocals
- Reanna Sujeewon – vocals
- Uzoechi Emenike – songwriting
- Aminata Kabba – songwriting
- Michelle O'Faith – songwriting
- Floyd Dyce – songwriting
- Paul Visser (Note: Visser was credited under his producer tag, Goldcrush.) – production, recording arranger, programming
- Willow Kayne – production
- Maegan Cottone – vocal arranger, vocal production
- Jay Reynolds – mixing and mastering engineer

== Release history ==
Region	Date	Format	Label	Ref.
Various	4 September 2025	Digital download; streaming	Polydor	
