= Need to Know (EP) =

2026 EP by XO

EP by XO
- Released: 16 October 2026
- Recorded: 2024–2026
- Genre: Pop
- Length: 20:37
- Label: Polydor
- Producers: Goldcrush; Willow Kayne; Lindgren; Paul Meehan; Kjetil Mørland; Nutu; Paul Visser

XO chronology
Fashionably Late (2025)	Need to Know (2026)

Singles from Need to Know
- 1. "Hotline" Released: 24 April 2026; 2. "Clique" Released: 3 July 2026; 3. "Stacey (Take You Higher)" Released: 4 September 2026

Need to Know is the second extended play by the British girl group XO. It was released on 16 October 2026 through Polydor Records. Described by the group as a "mini-album", it is a conceptual project that reframes prompts from advice columns listing "20 Things You Need to Know in Your Twenties" into songs. It was preceded by three singles: "Hotline", "Clique" and "Stacey (Take You Higher)". XO have promoted the EP with various live appearances, including festival sets and residencies at Colours, Hoxton and G-A-Y in Heaven.

== Background and release ==
XO were formed by Polydor Records in late 2024, selecting auditionees Summer Askew, Shali Bordoni, Zoë Miller, Emmy Statham and Reanna Sujeewon to be in the group. In September 2025, they released the song "Lovesick" as their debut single and the lead single from their debut extended play (EP), Fashionably Late (2025). Fashionably Late was released on 14 November of that year.

"Hotline" was released as the lead single from Need to Know on 24 April 2026. The first release for XO since Fashionably Late, it felt like a "reintroduction" for the group. Despite having already recorded "Hotline" and other unreleased tracks at the time of their debut EP, they had a set release schedule they wanted to follow. Sujeewon explained: "We've been sitting on a lot of these tracks for a really long time, even since the first EP, because we knew the journey that we wanted to take. We've come into this year with a 'boom!'; we know what we're releasing, we're just excited to get it all out. Last year was a lot of research and development in real life, we were learning as we went. Now, we've figured out the plan. We've got such sick things to come!"

"Clique" was released as the second single on 3 July. The music video leaned into the group's real-life formation, with it being set in the audition room where the members initially met. "Stacey (Take You Higher)" followed on 4 September. Miller revealed that it was not originally intended to be the third single until the group heard it and appealed the decision to their label. The EP was eventually released on 16 October.

== Composition ==
With Fashionably Late, XO felt the music had established a group dynamic and for Need to Know, they wanted to shift the focus onto their individual characteristics. Miller felt that the EP would defy people's expectations of XO; she stated: "We've got a lot of music coming out that isn't what people are expecting from us. That's really exciting. I don't know how much I'm allowed to say, but we're switching the vibes a little bit". She concluded that XO felt their job as creatives was to make people feel something new through their art.

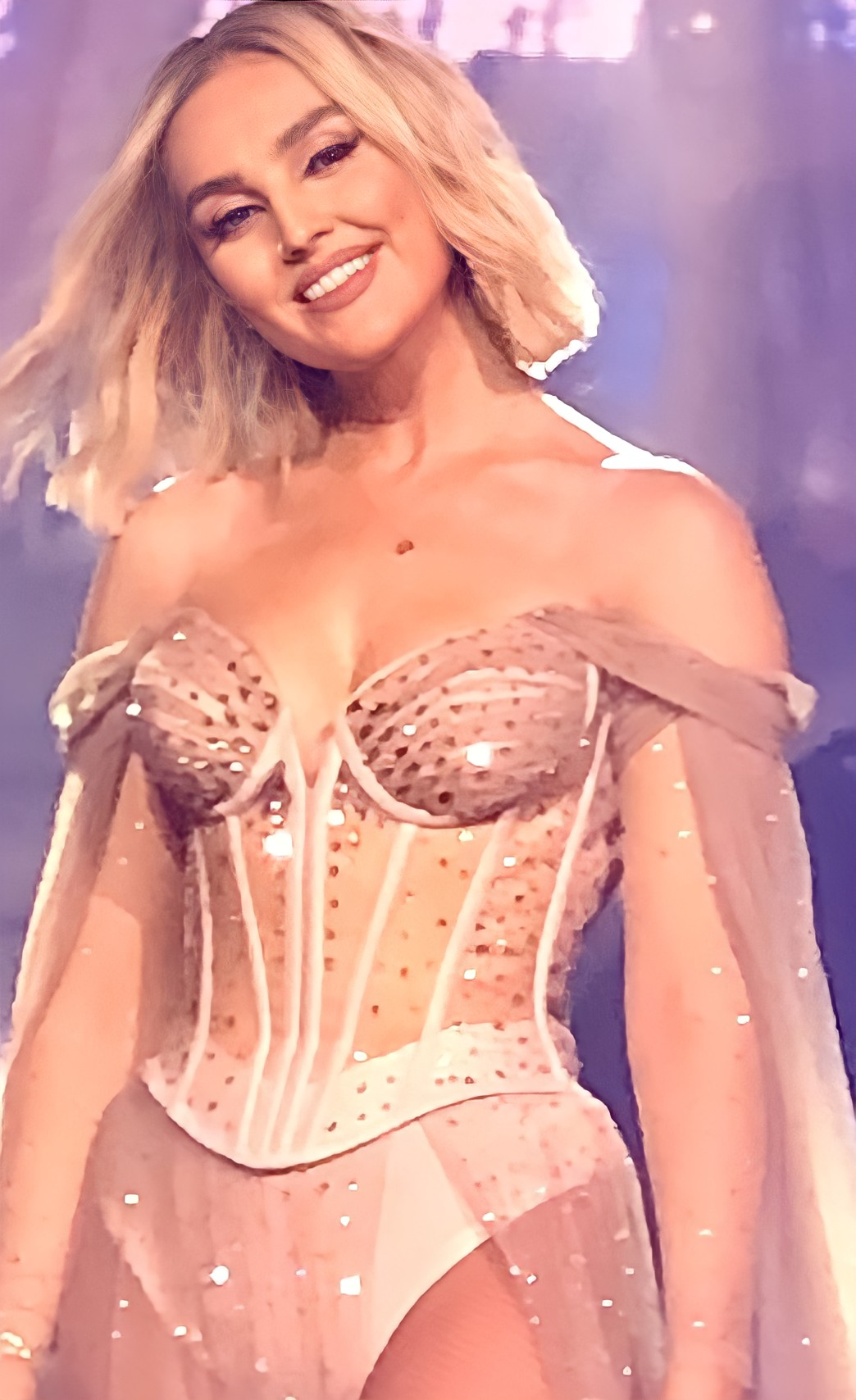
"Tell Me How It Feels" was originally a demo recorded by Perrie Edwards.

Need to Know has been described as a conceptual project that takes loose inspiration from advice columns listing "20 Things You Need to Know In Your Twenties". Various prompts were reframed into songs, beginning with opening track "Hotline". The track centres on an advice centre for getting over an ex, while dissecting themes of friendship and sisterhood that have been shown in XO's prior releases. The chorus urges people to "ring on the hot girl hotline" for steps on how to become a better version of yourself following a relationship. "Clique" follows as the second track and was described as a "girl power anthem". Co-written by Willow Kayne, Ryan Tedder and Ellrod, it is a pop song which revolves around belonging to a sisterhood. The third song, "Stacey (Take You Higher)", was co-written for the group by MNEK, Kabba and Michelle O'Faith. It also interpolates the 1992 rave song "Let Me Be Your Fantasy" by Baby D. The lyrical content explores feeling jealous over a crush pining for someone else called Stacey.

"Human Nature" follows as the fourth track from Need to Know. Speaking on its meaning, Miller explained that the song follows the story of someone knowing a romantic partner is bad for them but wanting them regardless. She described it as "that toxic energy after a breakup that you really have to fight through". Bordoni agreed, describing it as the point during a night out "where you're telling your friends you're not texting, but you’re low-key texting". "Tell Me How It Feels", the next track, marked the first time XO had released a ballad and they felt the song showed them "really in [their] feels". In an interview with Wonderland, Statham revealed that it was originally a demo by Perrie Edwards, former member of Little Mix, who the group have cited as inspirations. Bordoni explained that despite loving the demo, they wanted to make it their own and stayed in a Westfield food court rewriting parts of the song late at night until asked by a staff member to leave.

"No Sour" follows as the penultimate track on Need to Know and was described as a 2000s-inspired song with a "dirty beat and irresistible melody". The lyrical content of the song follows the group on a night out and noticing someone at the bar who they are interested in. "Paper" concludes the EP and was noted by all five members as the song they are most excited to play live. Miller billed it as the song where they realise "do you know what? I was better off anyway".

== Promotion ==
"Clique" was initially performed on their debut tour in late 2025, before its release in mid-2026. In March 2026, XO performed at the Gaydio Awards; there, they debuted "Hotline". In June 2026, they promoted Need to Know at the Isle of Wight Festival, as well appearing at the Discovery Festival and All Points East in August. Also throughout August, XO held a month-long residency in Colours, Hoxton, throughout which they performed material from Need to Know for the first time prior to its release. They will also perform three shows at G-A-Y in Heaven: the first introduced the group to the audience, the second promoted the release of "Stacey (Take You Higher)" as the third single, while the third will be in promotion of the EP's release.

XO initially announced and promoted their Fashionably Late Tour, following the release of their debut EP. Tickets for the tour became available to purchase that same month. They were handled by Live Nation UK and Ticketmaster. It was set to see them visit five venues across England and Scotland throughout May, with the first date hosted by King Tut's Wah Wah Hut in Glasgow. However, after the release of "Hotline" and the announcement of Need to Know, the Fashionably Late Tour was retooled into the Need to Know Tour and was rescheduled for November 2026. However, the Need to Know tour was later cancelled.

== Critical reception ==
Writing for CelebMix, Philip Logan stated that XO had demonstrated that they understood pop music. He admitted that the EP did not "reinvent the wheel", but felt that it did not need to. He wrote that Need to Know "understands the enduring appeal of a great melody, a killer chorus and five girls who genuinely seem to love what they do. Rather than simply looking back to the golden era of girl bands, XO bring a fresh perspective to the formula: self-aware, unapologetic and fuelled by friendship". Logan also admired the ambition that XO had shown on the EP, noting that the members were balancing part-time jobs along their music career. Kate Wise, writing for GigNoise, noted that Need to Know showed XO were still forming their sound, but felt that they had begun to "carve out an identity of their own".

== Track listing ==
Need to Know track listing
No.	Title	Writer(s)	Producer(s)	Length
1.	"Hotline"	Summer Askew; Shali Bordoni; Zoe Miller; Emmy Statham; Reanna Sujeewon; Maegan Cottone; Megan Elizabeth Gallagher; Lindgren; Nutu; Harry Paynter	Nutu; Lindgren; Cottone^{[v]}	2:44
2.	"Clique"	Ellrod; Willow Kayne; Ryan Tedder	Kayne; Lindgren; Annabel Williams^{[v]}	1:51
3.	"Stacey (Take You Higher)"	Floyd Dyce; Uzoechi Emenike; Kayne; Aminata Kabba	Goldcrush; Cottone^{[v]}	3:03
4.	"Human Nature"	Ella Louise May; Paul Visser	Visser	3:04
5.	"No Sour"	Rachel Furner; Paul Meehan; Kjetil Mørland	Lindgren; Meehan; Mørland	3:11
6.	"Tell Me How It Feels"	Askew; Bordoni; Miller; Statham; Sujeewon; Cottone; Mike Green; Marlhy Murphy; Rick Parkhouse; Annika Rose; Sasha Sloan; George Tizzard; Josh Wilkinson	Goldcrush; Cottone^{[v]}	3:26
7.	"Paper"	Askew; Bordoni; Miller; Statham; Sujeewon; Visser	Visser	3:18
Total length:				20:37

=== Notes ===
- ^{^[v]} indicates a vocal producer.
- "Stacey (Take You Higher)" contains a sample of "Let Me Be Your Fantasy", performed by Baby D and written by Floyd Dyce.

== Personnel ==
Credits are adapted from Tidal.

=== XO ===
- Summer Askew – vocals
- Shali Bordoni – vocals
- Zoe Miller – vocals
- Emmy Statham – vocals
- Reanna Sujeewon – vocals

=== Addiitonal contributors ===
- Jay Reynolds – mixing, mastering
- Lindgren – recording arrangement (tracks 1, 2), programming (2, 5)
- Maegan Cottone – background vocals (1), vocal arrangement (3, 6)
- Nutu – programming, recording arrangement (1)
- Megan Elizabeth Gallagher – background vocals (1)
- Michel Schulz – programming (1)
- Paul Visser – recording arrangement (3), programming (4, 6, 7), vocal arrangement (6, 7)
- Goldcrush – programming (3)
