= Fashionably Late (EP) =

2025 EP by XO

EP by XO
- Released: 14 November 2025
- Recorded: 2024–2025
- Genre: Dance-pop; electropop
- Length: 15:13
- Label: Polydor
- Producer: Sebastian Furrer; Gil Lewis; Mattias Larsson; Lostboy; Harry Paynter; Risc; John Ryan

XO chronology
Fashionably Late (2025)	Need to Know (2026)

Singles from Fashionably Late
- 1. "Lovesick" Released: 19 September 2025; 2. "Real Friends" Released: 17 October 2025; 3. "Candy" Released: 14 November 2025

Fashionably Late is the debut extended play by British girl group XO. It was released on 14 November 2025 through Polydor Records. The first release from the EP was the promotional single "Ponytail", released in August 2025. It was followed by lead single "Lovesick", released on 19 September 2025. They subsequently released the second single, "Real Friends", a month later, followed by a third and final single, "Candy", released the same day as the EP.

Fashionably Late is primarily a dance-pop and electropop record, with lyrical content centred around friendship, girl power, self-confidence and experiences with relationships. It has been described as a conceptual project, exploring the arc of a night out throughout the songs on the EP. It features six songs, as well as two spoken interludes. Whilst recording for the EP, choreography and performance of the music was always considered, with member Emmy Statham feeling that the mix of genres on Fashionably Late represent the early days of XO.

== Background and release ==
XO were formed by Polydor Records in late 2024, selecting auditionees Summer Askew, Shali Bordoni, Zoë Miller, Emmy Statham and Reanna Sujeewon to be in the group. They have stated that they knew each other prior to being put in the group, from various auditions they had attended together. In 2025, XO embarked on a tour of schools across the United Kingdom, performing to schoolchildren and hosting discussions around mental health, body image and aspirations. Alongside other songs, they performed "Ponytail". The track was released on social media in August 2025 and it was later confirmed that the song would appear on streaming services when their first musical project was released.

In September 2025, XO released the song "Lovesick" as their debut single and the lead single from the project. Whilst receiving airplay from BBC East Midlands, the station confirmed that XO's debut extended play would be titled Fashionably Late. In a piece written by the Sunday Times, they confirmed the release was scheduled for November 2025 and featured songs co-written by Charli XCX and Lostboy. "Real Friends", co-written by Charli XCX, was released as the second single from the EP in October 2025. XO formally announced the release for Fashionably Late on 22 September 2025; they confirmed it would be released on 14 November. Speaking to The Line of Best Fit about the EP, Askew stated that the project would "set the tone" for their forthcoming music, while Miller joked that it would be "world domination".

== Composition ==
Upon the announcement for Fashionably Late, it was confirmed it would feature six tracks; their first three releases, as well as three new songs: "Rush Hour", "Candy" and "Silly Boy". It also features two interludes; "Give a Girl Her Shoe!" and "Dead Chat!". The EP is conceptual and shows the arc of a night out: getting ready and leaving in "Rush Hour", taking charge in "Candy", falling for someone in "Lovesick" and going back to friends in "Real Friends". Member Statham has stated that whilst making music for the project, they had no specific musical direction and felt that Fashionably Late represented numerous genres they wanted to explore in their early days of the group. Miller appreciated the direction they had took, comparing it to 2000s musicians like Fergie, who "just did what they wanted, they had a good time and it was all the vibes in the world". Bordoni also stated that every song was made with choreography and performance in mind.

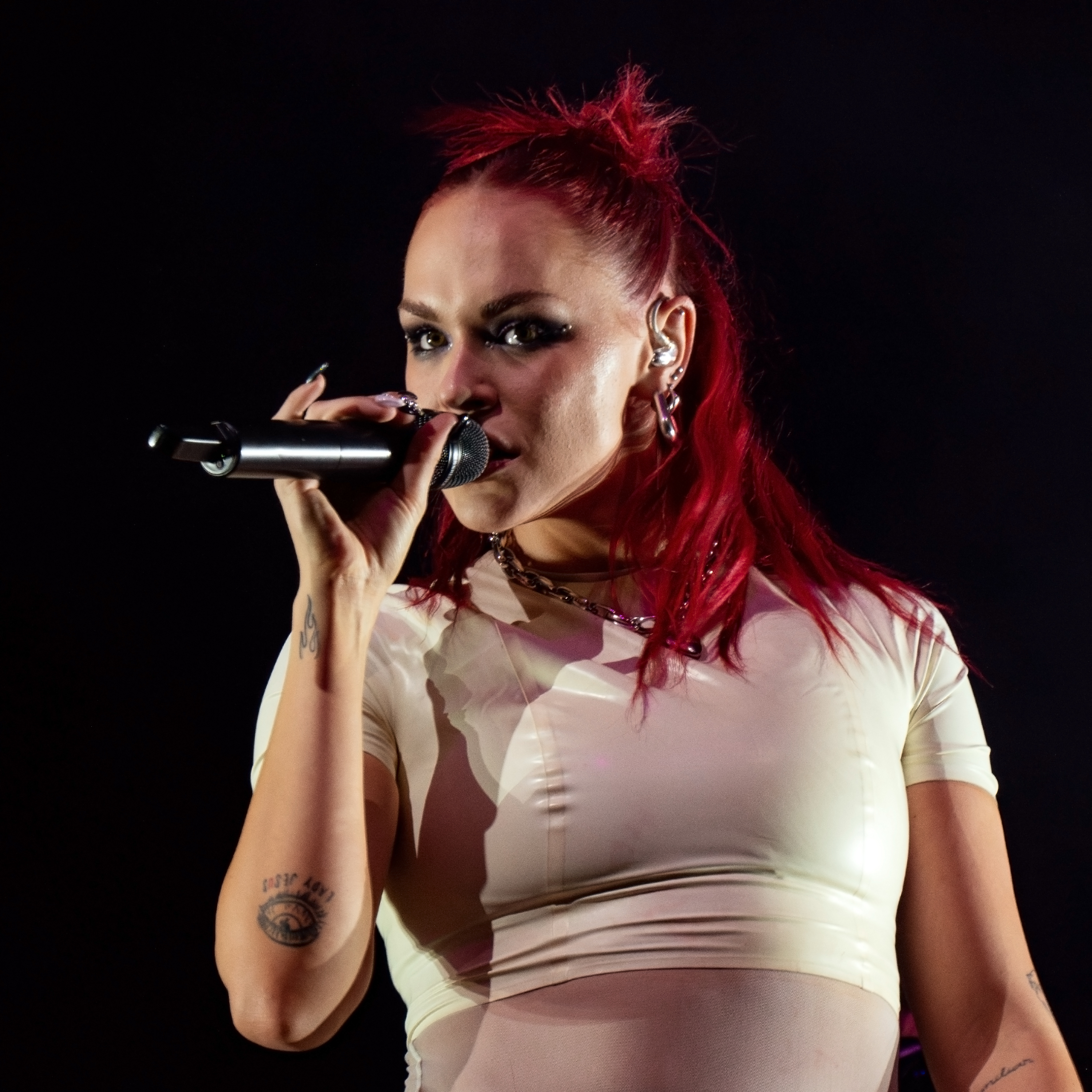
Upsahl co-wrote closing track "Silly Boy", a song about catcalling, with XO.

The opening track of the EP, "Lovesick", was written by Willow Kayne and Gracey. It was described by Clash magazine as a "titanic debut single" with "irresistibly catchy" arrangements that allows each member of the group to introduce themselves, with Wonderland billing it a "pulsating electropop anthem". Its lyrical content centers around falling in love with someone on a night out and kissing them on a night bus. The second song, "Real Friends", was produced by John Ryan and Mattias Larsson. NME described it an electropop song and a "swaggering and empowered anthem". It focuses on championing the true friends in their lives. XO confirmed that despite being wrote for them, they changed some of the lyrical content to make it feel more authentic to them.

"Rush Hour" details the process of getting ready and having pre-drinks with friends before going out. "Candy" follows, which was likened to the works of Timbaland, Gwen Stefani and the Pussycat Dolls. "Ponytail" explores moving on from a past relationship, while the closing track, "Silly Boy", was written as a response to men who catcall women. The idea for the track came to Miller and Bordoni whilst in an Uber. When they had to take a taxi since Transport for London was not working, they drove past a group of football fans who catcalled the group. Bordoni suggested using a whistle for the song's motif and they developed it five months later with Upsahl at a songwriting camp in Stockholm.

== Promotion ==
Amongst various songs, XO performed the song "Ponytail" on their 2025 school tour. They then performed "Ponytail" on the CBBC live magazine series Saturday Mash-Up!. XO also embarked on their first headline tour across the United Kingdom in October 2025 in promotion of the EP. In May 2026, they were set to once again tour across the United Kingdom with the Fashionably Late Tour. However, after the release of their single "Headline", they announced that they would be releasing a second EP, Need to Know (2026). Set for an October 2026 release, the Fashionably Late Tour was retooled into the Need to Know Tour and was rescheduled for November 2026.

== Critical reception ==
Fame described the EP as "loud, messy, and gloriously unfiltered" and "exactly what pop's been missing". They also appreciated the rollout of XO's debut project, noting that it was not a "polished girlband rollout", but a "full-body rush". In a further review, they agreed with what they initially said of the project, billing it a "six-track blast of attitude, harmony, and girl-gang energy that instantly cements them as Britain's next breakout force". CelebMix called Fashionably Late "bold, raw, unapologetic, and refreshingly offbeat" and found that it gave an authentic snapshot of the member's lives and personalities.

== Track listing ==
Fashionably Late track listing
No.	Title	Writer(s)	Producer(s)	Length
1.	"Lovesick"	Grace Barker; Willow Kayne; Gil Lewis	Lewis	2:38
2.	"Real Friends"	Summer Askew; Shali Bordoni; Zoe Miller; Emmy Statham; Reanna Sujeewon; Charlotte Aitchison; Maegan Cottone; Robin Fredriksson; Mattias Larsson; John Ryan	Larsson; Ryan; Cottone^{[v]}; Chris Young^{[v]}	2:29
3.	"Give a Girl Her Shoe!"	Askew; Bordoni; Miller; Statham; Sujeewon		0:06
4.	"Rush Hour"	Olivia Devine; Harry Paynter	Paynter; Cameron Gower-Poole^{[v]}	2:16
5.	"Candy"	Kayne; Lewis; Lotte Mørkved	Lewis^{[p]}	2:15
6.	"Ponytail"	Lauren Aquilina; Maria Hazell; Peter Rycroft; Christopher Smith	Lostboy; Risc; Annabel Williams^{[v]}	2:36
7.	"Dead Chat!"	Askew; Bordoni; Miller; Statham; Sujeewon		0:09
8.	"Silly Boy"	Askew; Bordoni; Miller; Statham; Sujeewon; Sebastian Furrer; Taylor Upsahl	Furrer; Paynter^{[v]}	2:41
Total length:				15:13

=== Notes ===
- ^{^[p]} indicates a primary and vocal producer.
- ^{^[v]} indicates a vocal producer.

== Personnel ==
Credits adapted from Tidal.

=== XO ===
- Summer Askew – vocals
- Shali Bordoni – vocals
- Zoe Miller – vocals
- Emmy Statham – vocals
- Reanna Sujeewon – vocals

=== Additional contributors ===
- Jay Reynolds – mixing, mastering
- Gil Lewis – programming, engineering (track 1)
- Robin Fredriksson – programming, engineering (2, 5)
- John Ryan – programming (2)
- Mattias Larsson – programming (2)
- Harry Paynter – engineering (3, 7), programming (4)
- Cameron Gower-Poole – engineering (4, 6)
- Lostboy – programming (6)
- Risc – programming (6)
- Sebastian Furrer – programming (8)
