= Kabba (singer) =

Sierra Leonean–British singer (born 1994)

KABBA
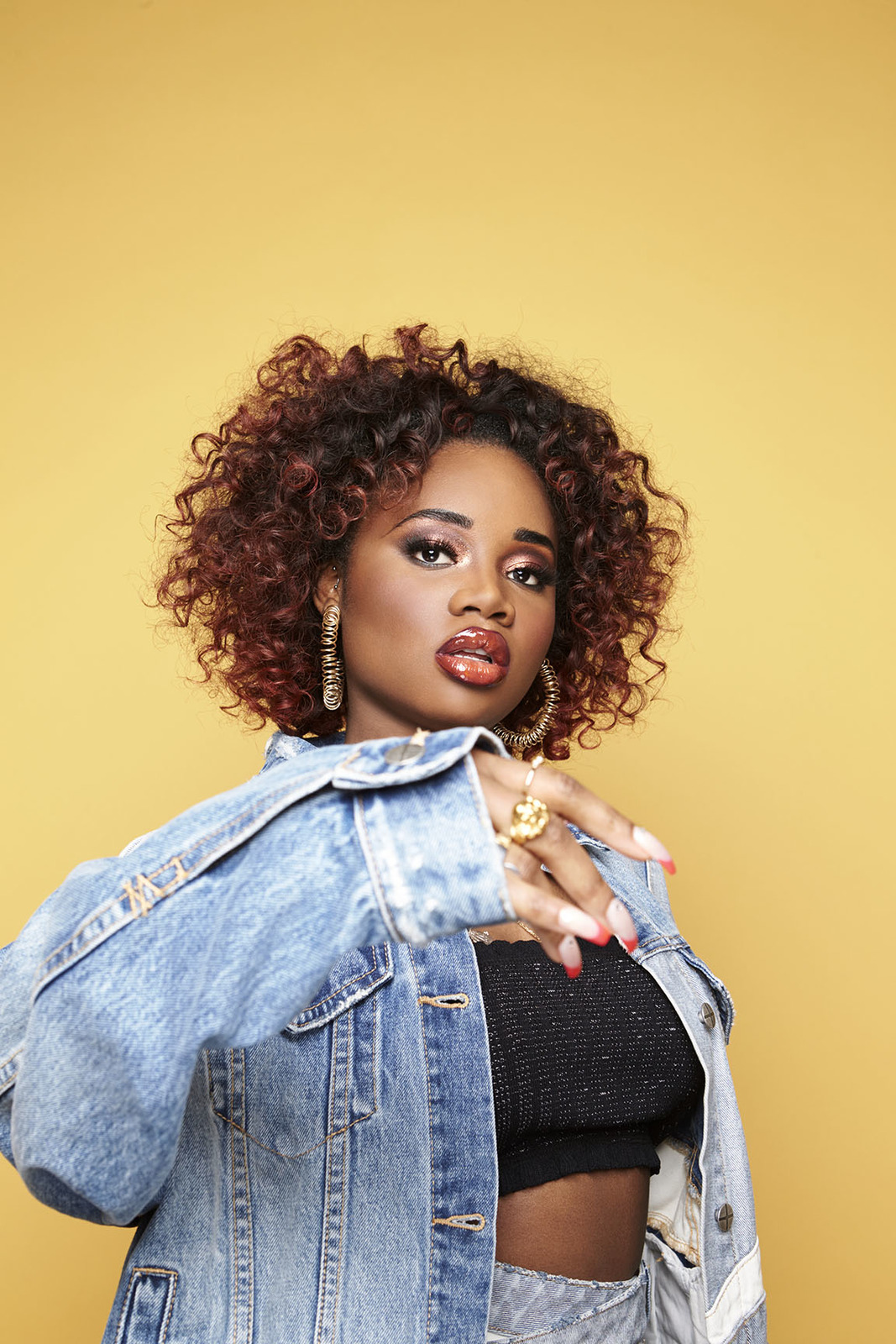
- KABBA in 2020

Background information
- Also known as: A*M*E
- Born: Aminata Kabba; 13 December 1994 (age 31); Freetown, Sierra Leone
- Origin: London, England
- Genres: R&B; pop; hip hop soul; dance
- Occupations: Singer; songwriter
- Instrument: Vocals
- Years active: 2010–present
- Labels: Future; Universal; Epic
- Website: kabbamusic.com

Aminata Kabba (born 13 December 1994), also known by her stage name Kabba (stylised as KABBA), formerly A*M*E, is a British singer and songwriter.

In 2011, A*M*E was scouted and signed by Take That frontman Gary Barlow to his label, Future Records. On 9 December 2012, the BBC announced that KABBA – then A*M*E – had been nominated for the Sound of 2013 poll. In January 2013, A*M*E signed to Sony Music's Epic Records after Barlow closed Future Records to focus on his own career commitments. The Duke Dumont single "Need U (100%)", featuring A*M*E and MNEK, topped the UK Singles Chart on 7 April 2013.

== Biography ==
=== 1994–2011: Early life ===
Kabba was born in Freetown, Sierra Leone. At the age of eight, she moved to England after her mother's hair salon was burned to the ground and life in Sierra Leone became too dangerous. Growing up in the Catford area of south-east London, A*M*E was introduced to fellow teenage prodigy MNEK. The pair bonded over a mutual love of '90s pop music and started collaborating, quickly creating a handful of songs including "City Lights". The track was enough to pique the interest of Take That frontman Gary Barlow, who proceeded to sign her to his Future record label.

=== 2012–2018: Career beginnings: A*M*E ===
In 2012, A*M*E released a string of promotional singles called "City Lights" (featuring Bartoven), "Ride or Die" and "Find a Boy", which she co-wrote alongside Emeli Sandé and producer Naughty Boy.

It was announced by The Guardian in September 2012 that A*M*E would release her first commercial single, "Play The Game Boy", in November 2012. Produced by Electric, the track attained positive reviews, with Digital Spy listing the song as one of its 'Top 10 tracks You Need to Hear'; commenting on "[its] insanely addictive choruses and K-pop inspired melodies" and that "it feels fresher than anything else on this week's chart."

On 9 December 2012, the BBC announced that A*M*E had been nominated for the Sound of 2013 poll alongside the likes of Angel Haze and The Weeknd.

Her collaboration with Duke Dumont, "Need U (100%)" was released in March 2013. It became both acts' most successful single at the time, debuting at number one and remaining there for two weeks, and earned her a nomination in the Best Dance Recording category at the 56th Annual Grammy Awards.

On 14 July 2014, A*M*E released her second official single, "Heartless", produced by Carl Falk and Rami Yacoub. She also featured on Monsieur Adi's single "What's Going On?", CamelPhat's "Paradigm", MK's "My Love 4 U", Tough Love's "Closer to Love", Shift K3Y's "Entirety", as well as appearing on M-22's "White Lies".

=== 2019–present: KABBA and debut EP ===
Through an Instagram post on 8 July 2019, A*M*E announced that she would rebrand as KABBA.

KABBA announced the first single from her self titled debut EP on 12 July 2019. It is titled "Glue" and features Bartoven, who previously appeared on her song "City Lights". The song was first premiered on COMPLEX on 24 July 2019. In the article, KABBA explained the reasons behind her rebrand, stating: "KABBA is a Sierra Leonean name and part of my identity that is so precious to me. Now that I'm entering a new phase in my career, I'm free to fully embrace KABBA."

Her debut EP KABBA was released on 14 February 2020.

== Artistry ==
=== Influences ===
KABBA has been heavily influenced by K-pop, saying "I love my K-pop, but I haven't really done anything with that sound yet. There's influences from it in my music – I've got some fat, solid, six-part melodies which are very K-poppy." KABBA cites Beyoncé, Jimmy Jam and Terry Lewis and Big Bang as her influences, she also cites Janet Jackson as a major influence calling Jackson her idol.

== Discography ==
=== Extended plays ===
Title	Details
KABBA	Released: 14 February 2020; Label: Self-released; Format: Digital download
Note to Self	Released: 29 October 2021; Label: Self-released; Format: Digital download

=== Singles ===
==== As lead artist ====
Title	Year	Album
"City Lights" (featuring Bartoven)	2012	Non-album singles
"Ride or Die"	2012	Non-album singles
"Play the Game Boy"	2012	Non-album singles
"Heartless"	2013	Non-album singles
"Glue" (featuring Bartoven)	2019	KABBA
"My Work Is Done"	2019	KABBA
"Muscle"	2020	KABBA
"Rather Be Single"	2021	Note to Self
"Mood"	2021	Note to Self

==== As featured artist ====
Title	Year	Peak chart positions						Album
Title	Year	UK	AUS	BEL	DEN	IRE	NL	Album
"Need U (100%)" (Duke Dumont featuring A*M*E)	2013	1	40	17	31	27	20	Non-album single
"What's Going On?" (Monsieur Adi featuring A*M*E)	2013	–	—	—	—	—	—	Non-album single
"Paradigm" (CamelPhat featuring A*M*E)	2015	–	—	—	—	—	—	Axtone Ten
"My Love 4 U" (MK featuring A*M*E)	2016	–	—	—	—	—	—	Non-album single
"Closer to Love" (Tough Love featuring A*M*E)	2017	–	—	—	—	—	—	Past Present Future
"Entirety" (Shift K3Y featuring A*M*E)	2018	–	—	—	—	—	—	Non-album single

=== Promotional singles ===
Title	Year	Album
"Find a Boy" (A*M*E featuring Mic Righteous)	2012	Non-album single

=== Guest appearances ===
Title	Year	Artist	Album	Notes
"One Thousand"	2012	Cheryl Cole	A Million Lights	Un-credited backing vocals
"Future X Girl"	2014	Neon Jungle	Welcome to the Jungle	Un-credited backing vocals
"WTF (Interlude)"	2017	Brayton Bowman	22 Minutes Later	Un-credited speaker
"All In"	2018	Throttle	Non-album single	Writer and un-credited lead vocalist
"White Lies"	2019	M-22	Non-album single	Writer and un-credited lead vocalist

=== Songwriting credits ===
Year	Artist	Album	Song	Co-written with
2012	f(x)	Electric Shock	"Beautiful Stranger"	Mich Hansen, Jason Gill
2013	Samsaya	Bombay Calling	"Stereotypes"	Sampda Sharma, Iain Farquharson, Fredrik Ball
2013	Duke Dumont	Non-album single	"Need U (100%)" (featuring A*M*E)	Uzoechi Emenike, Robbie Bergin
2014	Neon Jungle	Welcome to the Jungle	"Future X Girl"	Anita Blay, Benjamin Berry
2015	Duke Dumont	Non-album single	"The Giver (Reprise)"	Adam Dyment, Hal Ritson, Kelli-Leigh Henry-Davila, Uzoechi Emenike
2016	JKAY	Non-album single	"Stranger" (featuring Shola Ama)	Jonathan Keep, Marvin Humes, Uzoechi Emenike, Caroline Furoyen, Sinai Tedros
2018	Mike Williams	Non-album single	"Give It Up"	Michael Willemsen, Stevie Appleton
2018	Throttle	Non-album single	"All In"	Uzoechi Emenike, Robbie Bergin
2019	Ryan Ashley	Non-album single	"Familiar"	Ryan Campbell, Roberto Manfredi
2019	M-22	Non-album single	"White Lies"	Andre Nookadu, Andrew Bullimore, Frank Sanders, Matthew Humphrey
2020	Sleepwalkrs	Non-album single	"More Than Words" (featuring MNEK)	Roberto Manfredi, Thomas Hollings, Samuel Brennan, Uzoechi Emenike
2020	KSI	All Over The Place	"Really Love" (featuring Craig David and Digital Farm Animals)	Olajide Olatunji, Craig David, James Murray, Mustafa Omer, Nicholas Gale, Eugen Nwohia, Ronald Nwohia, Michael Ashley, Paul Newman, Steve Wickham
2020	Amun	Non-album single	"Done Me"	Uzoechi Emenike, Raoul Chen, Alexander Montell, Amun Ahmed
2021	Like Son	Non-album single	"One Night Only"	Conor Blake, Joseph Paul Murphy, Nathan Richards, Samuel Brennan, Tom Hollings
2021	Joel Corry	Non-album single	"I Wish" (featuring Mabel)	Harlee Jayne Sudworth, Jess Glynne, Joel Corry, Lewis Thompson, Mabel McVey, Neave Applebaum, Paul Harris, Poppy Baskcomb, Robert Harvey, Uzoechi Emenike
2021	Amun	No Ceilings	"Press Delete"	Tyler Hotston, Amun Ahmed
2025	Zach Campbell	Midnight Bodies	"Red Flags"	Zach Campbell, Uzoechi Emenike
2025	Zach Campbell	Midnight Bodies	"Strip"	Zach Campbell, Uzoechi Emenike
2025	Zach Campbell	Midnight Bodies	"Midnight Bodies"	Zach Campbell, Uzoechi Emenike
2025	Zara Larsson	Midnight Sun	"Girl's Girl"	Zara Larsson, Uzoechi Emenike, Tyler Christian Lewis, Patricio Contreras
2025	Twice	This Is For	"Dat Ahh Dat Ooh"	Uzoechi Emenike, Tate Farris, Jamal Woon, Relyt
2026	Say Now	Non-album single	"Millions"	Ysabelle Salvanera, Amelia Onuorah, Madeleine Haynes, Ashton Sellars, Ifeoluwa Oladigbolu "Maestro the Baker", Ines Dunn, Maisie Peters
2026	XO	Need to Know	"Stacey (Take You Higher)"	Floyd Dyce, Uzoechi Emenike, Willow Kayne

== Music videos ==
Song	Year	Artist	Director	Reference(s)
"City Lights"	2012	A*M*E (featuring Bartoven)	Ashur Yelda, Aram Antabil, Ashley McDermott & Chantelle Fiddy	
"Ride or Die"	2012	A*M*E	Ashur Yelda, Aram Antabil, Ashley McDermott & Chantelle Fiddy	
"Play the Game Boy"	2012	A*M*E	Patrick Killingbeck	
"Heartless"	2013	A*M*E		
"Rather Be Single"	2021	KABBA	Amaka Lin	
"Mood"	2021	KABBA	Oliver Marshall	

== Awards and nominations ==
Year	Organisation	Award	Result
2012	BBC Sound of 2013	Sound of 2013	Nominated
2014	Grammy Awards	Best Dance/Electronic Recording: "Need U (100%)"	Nominated
