= Trip II the Moon (Part 2) =

Single by Acen Razvi
- B-side: "The Life and Crimes of a Ruffneck"
- Released: 1992
- Genre: Breakbeat hardcore; darkcore
- Length: 6:18
- Label: Production House
- Songwriter(s): Acen; F. Dyce
- Producer(s): Acen; Dice

Acen Razvi singles chronology
"Close Your Eyes ('XXX' Mix) / Close Your Eyes (Vitamin 'E' Mix)" (1991)	"Trip II the Moon (Part 2)" (1992)	"Trip II the Moon (Part 1)" (1992)

"Trip II the Moon (Part 2)", also known as "Trip II the Moon (The Darkside…)" is a 1992 single by breakbeat hardcore musician Acen Razvi. It went on to become his signature song and reached No. 71 on the UK Singles Chart.

It is one of the tracks in Acen's series of "Trip II the Moon" singles (others are Part 1 and Part 3), all using hip hop and spy film music samples. There is also another version named "Trip II the Moon (Parts 1 & 2)". Part 1 was released after Part 2. Both tracks appeared on The Pitchfork 500. Part 2 is closest to the darkcore genre.

== Samples ==
"Trip II the Moon (The Darkside…)" samples the following:

- "You Only Live Twice" by John Barry feat. Nancy Sinatra (1967)
- "Nobody (Can Love Me)" by Tongue 'n' Cheek (1988)
- "She's a Rainbow" by The Rolling Stones (1967)
- "Mindcontroller" by 80 Aum (1991)
- "A Little Game" by The Doors (1987)
- "Live Jam" by Daddy Freddy (1989)
- "Soul Talk-1970" by Johnny Hammond (1970)
- "A Chorus Line" by Ultramagnetic MC's (1989)
- "I Pioneered This (A Cappella)" by MC Shan (1988)

"The Life and Crimes of a Ruffneck" samples the following:

- "Chi Mai" by Ennio Morricone (1971)
- "Tick, Tick, Bang" by Prince (1990)
- Bang Zoom (Let's Go-Go)" by The Real Roxanne feat. Howie Tee (1986)
- "A Chorus Line" by Ultramagnetic MC's (1989)
- "Why Do You Think They Call It Dope?" by LL Cool J (1989)

"Trip II the Moon (The Darkside…) was itself sampled in:

- "Get Ready" by Calvertron and Downlink (2011)
- "Trip to R-Zone (Don't Get Off at Trumption)" by R-Zone (2013)

== Track listing ==
1. "Trip II the Moon (The Darkside…)" – 6:18
2. "The Life and Crimes of a Ruffneck" – 5:59

One version also includes "Close Your Eyes (Optikonfusion!)!!", later released as a standalone single.

== Personnel ==
- Acen Razvi, Dice – mixing, producing
- F. Dyce, Acen Razvi – writers
