= Candy (XO song) =

2025 single by XO

Single by XO

from the EP Fashionably Late
- Released: 11 November 2025
- Genre: Pop
- Length: 2:15
- Label: Polydor
- Songwriters: Willow Kayne; Gil Lewis; Lotte Mørkved
- Producer: Lewis

XO singles chronology
"Real Friends" (2025)	"Candy" (2025)	"Hotline" (2026)

Music video
- "Candy" on YouTube

"Candy" is a song recorded by British girl group XO. It was released on 14 November 2025 through Polydor Records as the third and final single from the group's debut extended play, Fashionably Late (2025). It was written by Willow Kayne, Lotte Mørkved and Gil Lewis, with Lewis handling the production of the track.

The lyrical content of "Candy" sees XO taking charge of a romantic situation and persuading someone who is "sour like candy" to fall for their charms. Member Emmy Statham billed it her favourite from their EP and was excited to perform the song live. It was praised by critics, who likened it to the works of the Pussycat Dolls, Gwen Stefani and Timbaland. The decision to release "Candy" as a single as opposed to fan-favourite "Ponytail" was noted; however, the choice was complimented. An accompanying music video for "Candy" was released, which garnered a nomination for Music Video of the Year at the CelebMix Awards.

== Background and release ==
XO were formed for Polydor Records in late 2024, composed of members Summer Askew, Shali Bordoni, Zoe Miller, Emmy Statham and Reanna Sujeewon. Their debut single, "Lovesick", was released on 19 September 2025. They performed the song on a tour across the United Kingdom, as well as "Real Friends", their second single, and "Candy", which was unreleased at the time. Eventually, XO announced the details of their debut extended play (EP), Fashionably Late, which was released on 14 November 2025. "Candy" was released as the third and final single from the EP on the day of its release, with an accompanying music video.

== Composition and lyrics ==
"Candy" has been described as a pop song. It was written by Willow Kayne, Lotte Mørkved and Gil Lewis, with Lewis handling the production of the track. XO had previously worked with Kayne and Lewis on their debut single, "Lovesick". The lyrical content of the song explores XO "taking charge" of a romantic situation by ordering them what to do. It centres around someone "playing hard to get", billing the person they want as being as sour as candy until they decide to give in to XO's charm. Member Statham billed it her favourite from their debut EP, stating it is easy "to dance and choreograph to, she's hot, she's flirty and has that 90s pop girly feel".

== Critical reception ==
"Candy" was likened to the works of the Pussycat Dolls, Gwen Stefani and Timbaland, with Record of the Day adding that they had the attitude of the Sugababes on the song. They also appreciated the confidence shown by XO on the song. Fame praised "Candy", calling it "high-octane" and opining that it was the standout from Fashionably Late. They also complimented the music video for "Candy", noting that it is "choreography-heavy". EQ Music was surprised by the choice to release "Candy" as a single as opposed to fan-favourite song "Ponytail". They felt the group had "swerved expectations" but were complimentary of the decision, writing that "Candy" is "clip, playful, punchy, and brimming with the choreo the group is clearly destined to be known for". The accompanying music for "Candy" was nominated for Music Video of the Year at the 2025 CelebMix Awards.

== Credits and personnel ==
Credits adapted from Spotify.

- Summer Askew – vocals
- Shali Bordoni – vocals
- Zoe Miller – vocals
- Emmy Statham – vocals
- Reanna Sujeewon – vocals
- Willow Kayne – songwriting
- Gil Lewis – songwriting, production, programming
- Lotte Mørkved – songwriting
- Jay Renolds – mixing, mastering

== Release history ==
Region	Date	Format	Label	Ref.
Various	14 November 2025	Digital download; streaming	Polydor	
