= So Pure (disambiguation) =

"So Pure" is a song by Alanis Morissette from her album Supposed Former Infatuation Junkie. The term may also refer to:

- "So Pure" (Baby D song)
- "So Pure", a song by the 3rd and the Mortal from the album In This Room
