= Trip II the Moon =

Single by Acen Razvi
- Released: Summer 1992
- Genre: Breakbeat hardcore; happy hardcore
- Length: 5:49; 3:50 (music video)
- Label: Production House
- Songwriter(s): Acen; F. Dyce
- Producer(s): Acen; Dice

Acen Razvi singles chronology
"Trip II the Moon (Part 2)" (1992)	"Trip II the Moon" (1992)	"Window In The Sky (Parts 1 & 2)" (1993)

"Trip II the Moon" also known as "Trip II the Moon (Part 1)" is a 1992 single by breakbeat hardcore musician Acen Razvi. It went on to become his signature song and only British top 40 single, reaching No. 38 on UK Singles Chart on 8 August 1992.

It is one of the tracks in Acen's series of "Trip II the Moon" singles series (others are Part 2 (The Darkside…) and Part 3), all using hip hop and spy film music samples. There is also another version named "Trip II the Moon (Parts 1 & 2)". Part 1 was released after Part 2. Both tracks appeared on The Pitchfork 500. Part 1 is the lightest of all versions and is closest to happy hardcore (also using its imagery in its music video).

Alexis Petridis, writing for The Guardian in 2020, listed "Trip II the Moon" at number 2 in his list of his 25 best early '90s breakbeat hardcore tracks.

== Samples ==
"Trip II the Moon" samples the following:

- "Capsule in Space" by John Barry (1967)
- "Freestyle Part 1" by MC Duke and Merlin (1989)
- "I Know You Got Soul" by Eric B. & Rakim (1987)
- "Nobody (Can Love Me)" by Tongue 'n' Cheek (1988)
- "Respirator Room Background in Spaceship – from 'Warriors Gate'" by Dick Mills (1981)

"Obsessed" samples the following:

- "Diamonds Are Forever" by Shirley Bassey (1971)
- "All We Wanna Do Is Dance (Adamski Remix)" by The House Crew (1989)
- "Boogie Down (Do It)" by Catch 22 (1989)
- Untitled by Hardnoise (1990)

== Track listing ==
1. "Trip II the Moon"
2. "Obsessed"

== Personnel ==
- Acen Razvi, Dice – mixing, producing
- F. Dyce, Acen Razvi – writers
