= Real Friends (XO song) =

2025 single by XO

Single by XO

from the EP Fashionably Late
- Released: 17 October 2025
- Genre: Electropop
- Length: 2:29
- Label: Polydor
- Songwriters: Summer Askew; Shali Bordoni; Zoe Miller; Emmy Statham; Reanna Sujeewon; Charlotte Aitchison; Maegan Cottone; Robin Fredriksson; Mattias Larsson; John Ryan
- Producers: Larsson; Ryan

XO singles chronology
"Lovesick" (2025)	"Real Friends" (2025)	"Candy" (2025)

Music video
- "Real Friends" on YouTube

"Real Friends" is a song recorded by British girl group XO, released on 17 October 2025. It features on the group's debut EP, Fashionably Late (2025), and is their second single. An acoustic version of "Real Friends" was later released.

It was initially written by Charli XCX, John Ryan and Mattias Larsson, with the demo being offered to the group. Band member Zoe Miller then partially re-wrote it resulting in the entire group getting co-credits for the song. The band later told Rolling Stone they found it "hard to wrap [their] head around" having their names credited with Charli XCX.

totalNtertainment describes the song as an "swaggering and empowered electro-pop anthem that champions those who will always be on your side". CelebMix praised the song calling it a "slick, swaggering slice of electro-pop" noting the Charli XCX-like "shimmering synths [and] sharp hooks", and "rebellious streak that turns vulnerability into power", further complimenting the production as "pulsating". Furthermore, they described it as their "boldest release yet" singling out its "punchy beats" and "unapologetic message about loyalty, independence, and staying true to your squad." Fame dubbed it a "full-body empowerment anthem" and praised their acoustic version which they felt proved that "the girls' harmonies are no joke".

== Personnel ==
Credits adapted from Spotify.

- Summer Askew – vocals, songwriting
- Shali Bordoni – vocals, songwriting
- Zoe Miller – vocals, songwriting
- Emmy Statham – vocals, songwriting
- Reanna Sujeewon – vocals, songwriting
- Charlotte Aitchison – songwriting
- Maegan Cottone – songwriting, vocal production
- Robin Fredriksson – songwriting, recording engineer, programming
- Mattias Larsson – songwriting, production, programming
- John Ryan – songwriting, production, programming
- Chris Young – vocal production
- Jay Reynolds – mixing engineer, mastering engineer

== Release history ==
Region	Date	Format	Label	Ref.
Various	17 October 2025	Digital download; streaming	Polydor	
