= Gracey (singer) =

English singer and songwriter

- Born: Grace Elizabeth Barker; 20 February 1998 (age 28); Brighton, East Sussex, England
- Occupations: Singer; songwriter
- Agent: Paradigm Talent Agency
- Musical career
- Genres: Pop; alt-pop
- Instrument: Vocals
- Years active: 2014–present
- Label: Independent
- Website: gracey.world

Grace Elizabeth Barker (born 20 February 1998, Brighton), known professionally as Gracey (stylised in all caps), is an English singer and songwriter who made her breakthrough in 2020 when she collaborated with 220 KID on the BRIT nominated single "Don't Need Love". The song reached a peak of number 9 for two weeks on the UK Singles Chart.

== Early life ==
Her family moved to Haywards Heath during her early childhood. She credits her dyslexia with helping her become more creative, and she went on to study musical theatre at the BRIT School in London from 2012 to 2016.

== Career ==
Through writing demos of pop songs and uploading them to SoundCloud, she was invited by Brian Higgins to join production team Xenomania at the age of sixteen. Her first professionally-recorded song was "By Your Side" by Jonas Blue featuring Raye, which went on to be certified platinum in the UK. Gracey's first single, "Different Things", was released in March 2019 and written as a demo for Little Mix. She has also written songs for Sub Focus, Rita Ora, Olly Murs, and Kylie Minogue. In May 2019, Gracey co-written Tiësto's single "Ritual", featuring Jonas Blue and Rita Ora. The song was a commercial success, peaking at number 24 in the UK, and has received a diamond certification in Poland from the Polish Society of the Phonographic Industry (ZPAV).

In September 2019, Gracey released her debut extended play, Imposter Syndrome. In December, she teamed up with 220 Kid on the single "Don't Need Love". Commercially successful in the UK, the song peaked at number 9 on the UK Singles Chart and has been certified Platinum by the British Phonographic Industry (BPI). It received a nomination for Song of the Year at the 41st Brit Awards. Following "Don't Need Love", she released "Empty Love", a collaboration with Australian singer Ruel. Due to the COVID-19 pandemic she was forced to postpone her first headline tour, which was due to take place in May 2020. Gracey's debut mini-album, The Art of Closure, was released on 13 November 2020. It contained nine songs, including a collaboration with Alexander 23. In October 2021, Gracey released her second extended play, Fragile.

Gracey was the support act at Anne-Marie's Dysfunctional Tour in 2022. Jo Forrest of TotalNtertainment praised her performance and wrote that she "makes the stage her own proving that, while she may still be carving out a career as an artist in her own right, it's a career that is only heading one way". That same year, she collaborated with Jax Jones and Martin Solveig on a single "Lonely Heart", which peaked at number 70 on the UK Singles Chart. In September 2022, she co-written the single "Psycho" by Anne-Marie and Aitch. The song saw commercial success in the UK, where it peaked at number 5 and was certified Platinum, making it Gracey's highest charting co-written song in the UK to date.

In January 2023, she revealed she had parted ways with her former label, Polydor and is now an independent artist. That same year, she was nominated for the A&R Award in the category "Songwriter of the Year".

On 10 July 2025, Gracey released her third extended play, Ladybug. Kimberly Kapela of The Luna Collective named it Gracey's "most personal and poignant work yet".

== Personal life ==
In an interview with MTV, Gracey lists her biggest music influences as Sia, The 1975, Lorde, Joni Mitchell, and Robyn.

In 2019, she underwent surgery for vocal cord nodules.

== Discography ==
=== Mini-albums ===
List of mini-albums, with release date and album name shown
Title	Album details
The Art of Closure	Released: 13 November 2020; Label: Polydor; Formats: Digital download, streaming

=== Extended plays ===
List of extended plays, with release date and album name shown
Title	EP details
Imposter Syndrome	Released: 20 September 2019; Label: Polydor; Formats: Digital download, streaming
Fragile	Released: 13 October 2021; Label: Polydor; Formats: Digital download, streaming
The Ladybug	Released: 10 July 2025; Label: Glassnote; Formats: Digital download, streaming

=== Singles ===
==== As lead artist ====
List of singles, with year released, selected chart positions, and album name shown
Title	Year	Peak chart positions		Album
Title	Year	UK	NZ Hot	Album
"Different Things"	2019	—	—	Imposter Syndrome
"If You Loved Me"	2019	—	—	Imposter Syndrome
"Easy for You"	2019	—	—	Imposter Syndrome
"Don't Need Love" (with 220 Kid)	2019	9	—	The Art of Closure
"Alone in My Room (Gone)"	2020	—	—	The Art of Closure
"Empty Love" (with Ruel)	2020	—	21	The Art of Closure
"Like That" (with Alexander 23)	2020	—	—	The Art of Closure
"Don't"	2020	—	—	The Art of Closure
"99%"	2020	—	—	The Art of Closure
"Got You Covered" (with Billen Ted)	2021	—	—	Non-album single
"What a Waste"	2021	—	—	Fragile
"The Internet"	2021	—	—	Fragile
"2000 Miles"	2021	—	—	Non-album single
"Lonely Heart" (with Jax Jones & Martin Solveig)	2022	70	—	Non-album single
"Delirium"	2024	—	—	The Ladybug
"Rhetorical Questions"	2024	—	—	The Ladybug
"Back to Then"	2024	—	—	The Ladybug
"Gimmicks"	2025	—	—	The Ladybug

==== As featured artist ====
List of singles, with year released and album name shown
Title	Year	Album
"Higher (Acoustic)" (Clean Bandit featuring Iann Dior and Gracey)	2021	Non-album single

=== Guest appearances ===
List of singles, with year released and album name shown
Title	Year	Album
"Rent Free" (KSI featuring Gracey)	2021	All Over the Place
"Back to Basics" (Craig David featuring Gracey)	2022	22
"Think Of Us" (The Chainsmokers with Gracey)	2023	Summertime Friends

=== Songwriting credits ===
Title	Year	Artist	Album	Co-written with
"By Your Side" (featuring Raye)	2016	Jonas Blue	Blue	Guy James Robin, George Astasio, Jon Shave, Jason Pebworht
"Don't You Feel It" (featuring Alma)	2017	Sub Focus	Non-album singles	Uzoiche Emenike, Edward Jenkins, Nicolaas Douwma
"Pictures In My Head"	2017	MJ Cole	Non-album singles	-
"Got The Feeling"	2017	Syn Cole & Kirstin	Non-album singles	Camille Purcell, Rene Pais, Steve Robson
"Sweet Coffee" (featuring Bassette)	2018	Mullally	Non-album singles	Connor Mullally Knight, Ari PenSmith
"Excuses"	2018	Olly Murs	You Know I Know	Olly Murs, Steve Robson
"Feel The Same"	2018	Olly Murs	You Know I Know	Ed Drewett, Nicholas Gale, Nile Rodgers, Olly Murs, Steve Robson
"Ritual"	2019	Tiesto, Jonas Blue & Rita Ora	The London Sessions	Tijs Verwest, Guy Robin, Fraser T. Smith, Wayne Hector, Michael Stonebank
"Know Me Too Well"	2020	New Hope Club & Danna Paola	New Hope Club	Blake Richardson, Brunk Valverde, Danna Paola, George Smith, Hajar Sbihi, Kane John Parfitt, Reece Bibby, Sam Merrifield
"Make You Dance"	2020	Meghan Trainor	Treat Myself	Meghan Trainor, Andrew Wells, Anthony Rossomando
"Do What We Like"	2020	Twice	Eyes Wide Open	Josh Record, Rod Radwagon, Sana
"Clouds"	2020	Steps	What the Future Holds	Jez Ashurst, Emma Rohan
"Feels Like Love" (featuring Miya Miya)	2021	Syn Cole	Non-album single	Edvard Erfjord, Henrik Michelsen, Iain James, Rene Pais
"Nah" (featuring Sinéad Harnett)	2021	Sonny Fodera & Kolidescopes	Wide Awake	Dan Dare, John Courtidis, Sinéad Harnett, Sonny Fodera
"Catch Me In The Air"	2022	Rina Sawayama	Hold The Girl	Rina Sawayama, Adam Crisp, Stuart Price, Oscar Scheller
"Stupid Dog"	2022	Madeline the Person	Chapter 3: The Burning	Madeline Holste, Siba, Andrew Jackson
"Psycho"	2022	Anne-Marie & Aitch	Unhealthy	Anne-Marie Nicholson, Harrison Armstrong, Tom Mann, Henry Tucker, Tom Hollings, Samuel Brennan
"Better Off"	2023	Anne-Marie	Unhealthy	Mustafa Omer, Henry Tucker, James Murray, Andrew Murray
"Now or Never"	2023	Martin Solveig & Faouzia	Back to Life	Mark Ralph, Amanda Warner, Martin Picandet, Peter Wade
"2005"	2023	Remedy Club & Elphi	Non-album singles	Henry Tucker, Neave Applebaum, Charlotte Boyle
"Other Boys"	2023	Marshmello & Dove Cameron	Non-album singles	Dove Cameron, Marshmello, Evan Blair, Everett Romano, Giselle Rosselli, Hugo Gruzman, James Lyell, Nicholas Gale, Sarah Solovay
"Elastic"	2024	Kylie Cantrall	Non-album singles	Lionel Castra, Ryan Marrone, Alna Elizabeth Hifmeyr
"The Plot"	2024	Caity Baser	Still Learning	Caity Baser, Conor Blake, Darren Lewis, Erin Doyle, Iyiola Babalola
"I'll Be Here For You"	2024	Caity Baser	Still Learning	Caity Baser, Conor Blake, Darren Lewis, Henry Tucker, Iyiola Babalola, Tom Mann
"Enemies" (featuring Shift K3Y & Bludnymph)	2024	Gryffin	Pulse	Conor Blake, Andrew Bullimore, Dan Griffith, Lewis Jankel, Kya Hansen
"If You Get It You Get It"	2024	Bimini	Non-album single	Bimini Bon-Boulash, Finn Keane, Matt Rad
"LUV?" (featuring Anne-Marie)	2025	Aitch	4	Harrison Armstrong, Anne-Marie Nicholson, Andrew Jackson, Andrew Murray, James Murray, Mustafa Omer, Henry Tucker, Phil Plested
"Romeo"	2025	Dove Cameron	Non-album singles	Dove Cameron, Madison Love, Jason Evigan, Lionel Crasta
"Depressed"	2025	Anne-Marie	Non-album singles	Anne-Marie Nicholson, Henry Tucker, Ryan Linvill
"Backwards"	2025	Jonas Brothers	Greetings from Your Hometown	Benjamin Ingrosso, Lionel Crasta, Mark Schick
"Lovesick"	2025	XO	Fashionably Late	Gil Lewis, Willow Kayne
"Baby Steps"	2025	Perrie	Perrie	Perrie Edwards, Sophia Brenan, Will Bloomfield
"Dopamine"	2025	Mr. Belt & Wezol (featuring Malou)	Non-album single	Conor Blake, Cornelius Kuron
"Can't Pull Me Down"	2026	Loreen	Wildfire	Lorine Zineb Nora Talhaoui, Bill Maybury, Samuel Brennan, Tom Hollings
"Finish Line"	2026	Ally Salort	Isn't It Sweeter?	Ally Salort, King Ed
"If We Had Forever"	2026	Ally Salort	Isn't It Sweeter?	Ally Salort, King Ed, James Essien
"Say It Like You Mean It"	2026	Mercer Henderson	Is It Fun Or Is It Over?	Mercer Henderson, Lionel Crasta

== Awards and nominations ==
Year	Award	Work	Category	Result	Ref.
2021	Brit Awards	"Don't Need Love" (with 220 Kid)	Best British Single	Nominated	
2023	A&R Awards	Herself	Songwriter Of The Year	Nominated	
