= White Lies (M-22 song) =

Single by M-22
- Released: 25 January 2019
- Genre: House
- Length: 2:56
- Label: 3 Beat; Casablanca; Republic
- Songwriters: Kevin Saunderson; Paris Grey; Aminata Jamieson; Andre Nookadu; Andrew Bullimore; Frank Buelles; Matt James
- Producer: M-22

M-22 singles chronology
"How Does It Feel" (2018)	"White Lies" (2019)

"White Lies" is a song recorded by British-German DJ and record producing duo M-22 featuring vocals from Kabba. The single, which samples portions of Inner City's 1989 song "Good Life," reached number 8 on the Mexico Ingles Airplay in April 2019, and number 5 on Billboard's Dance/Mix Show Airplay Chart in May 2019, their best placement on a US chart to date and eclipsing "First Time," which peaked at number 17 in August 2018.

== Track listing ==
Digital download
No.	Title	Length
1.	"White Lies"	2:56

== Certifications ==
Certifications for "White Lies"
Region	Certification	Certified units/sales
United Kingdom (BPI)	Silver	200,000^{‡}
^{‡} Sales+streaming figures based on certification alone.
