= L Devine =

English singer and songwriter

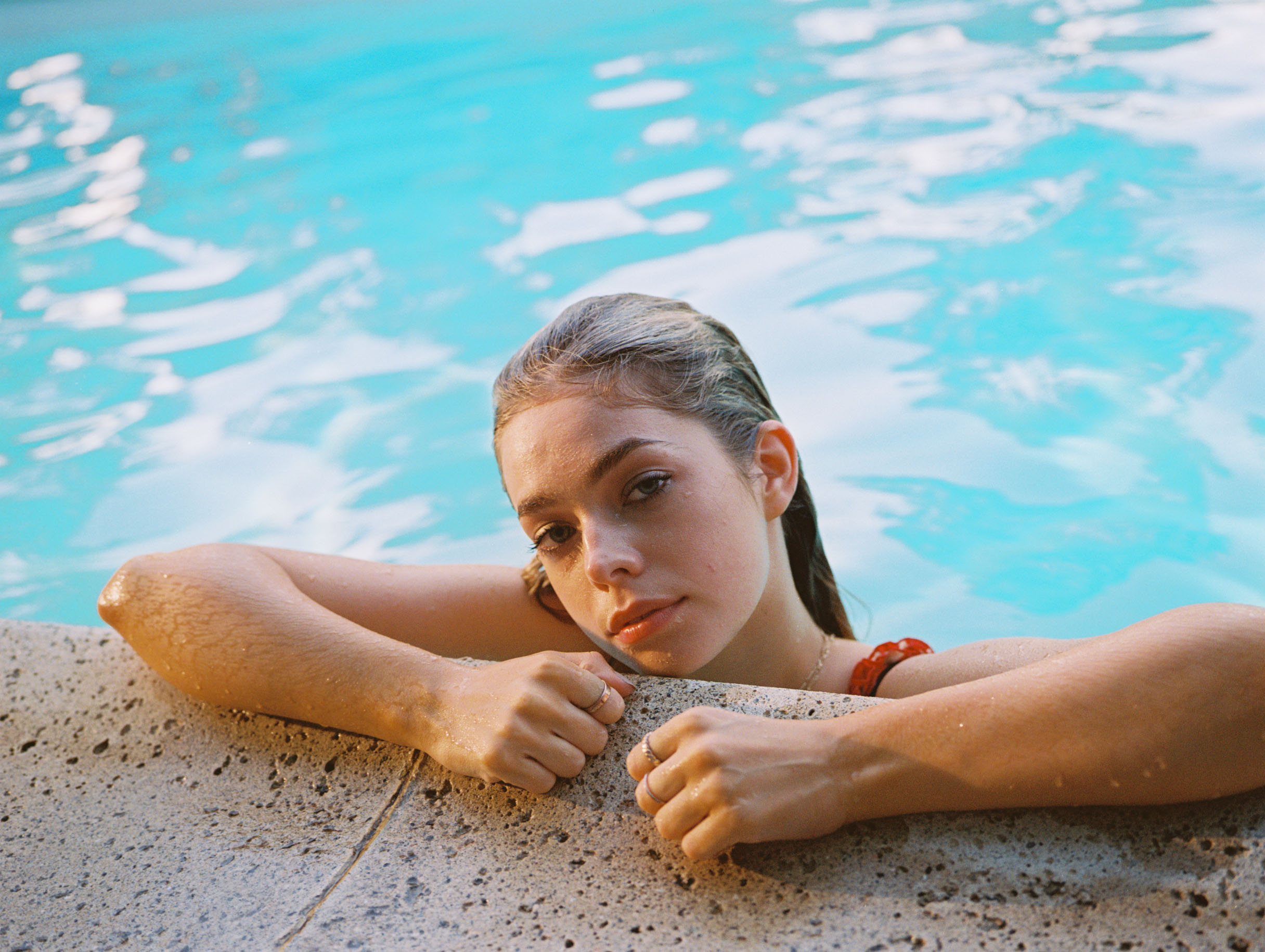
- Devine in 2018

Background information
- Born: Olivia Rebecca Devine; 21 June 1997 (age 28)
- Origin: Whitley Bay, Tyne and Wear, England
- Genres: Pop; electropop
- Occupations: Singer; songwriter
- Instruments: Vocals; piano; guitar
- Years active: 2017–present
- Labels: AWAL; Warner Bros.; BMG
- Website: ldevinemusic.com

Olivia Rebecca Devine (born 21 June 1997), known professionally as L Devine, is an English singer and songwriter. After signing a recording contract with Warner Records, she released her debut extended play (EP) Growing Pains (2017). This was followed by the release of two further EPs, Peer Pressure (2018) and Near Life Experience: Part 1 (2021). After parting from Warner, she became an independent artist and released her debut studio album, Digital Heartifacts, in 2024.

== Early and personal life ==
Devine was born and raised in Whitley Bay, a coastal town near Newcastle upon Tyne. Devine attended Newcastle High School for Girls, an independent day school, completing A' Levels in 2015. Inspired by the Clash and the Sex Pistols, she formed her first band, the Safety Pinz, when she was seven years old. She later posted a mash-up of her own music with Beyoncé's "Mine" to YouTube, which attracted the attention of producer Mickey Valen, and she subsequently saved up enough money to temporarily relocate to London to pursue a career in music. Devine adopted L Devine as her artist moniker because she shares the name Olivia Devine with a porn star.

In 2018, in an interview with The Line of Best Fit, Devine stated that she is a lesbian, commenting that "it's kind of nice now that there can be like a lesbian artist who just happens to be a pop star, or a pop star who happens to be queer".

== Career ==
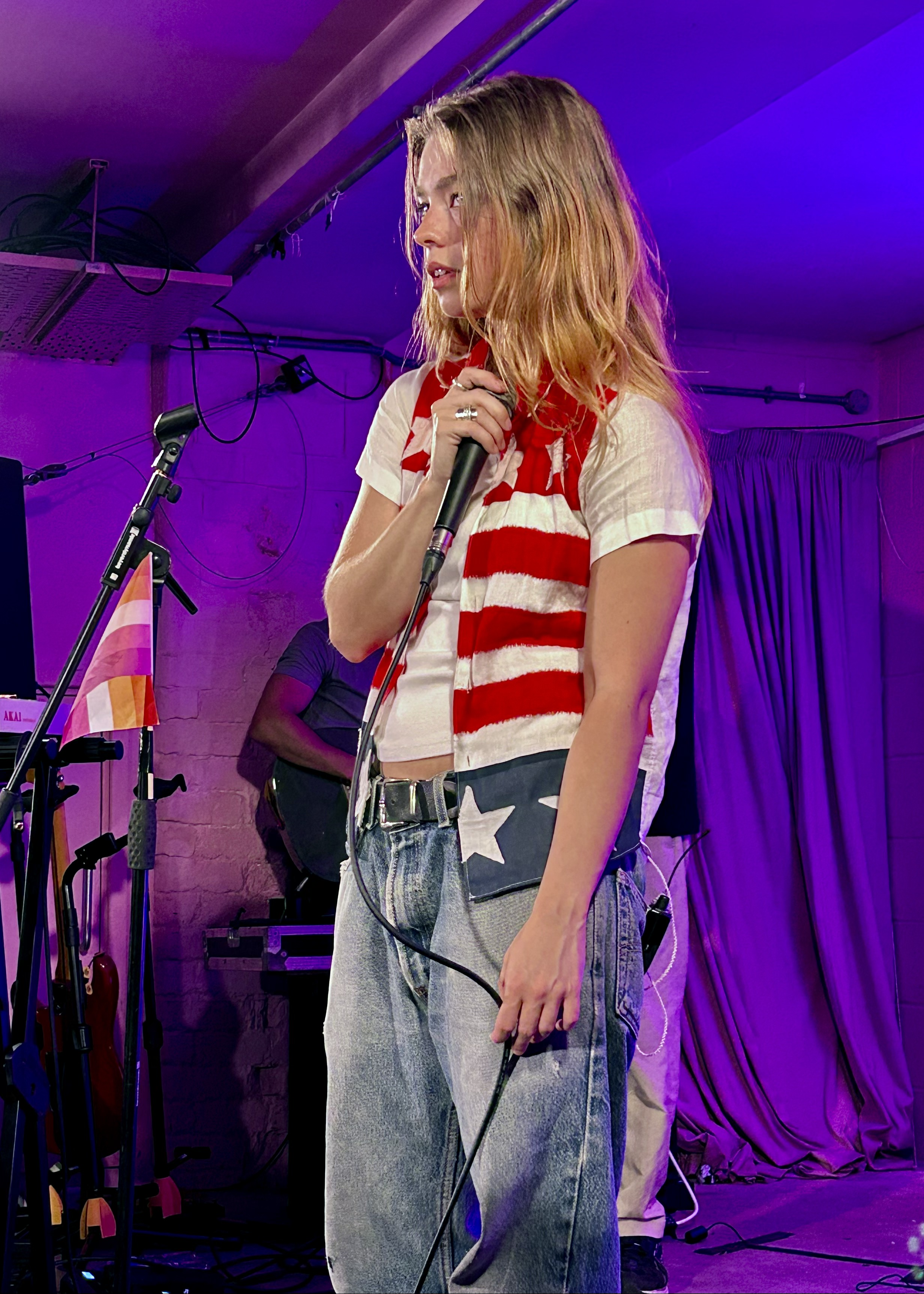
Devine performing at the Pink Room in Yes in Manchester, England.

Devine released her debut single, "School Girls", in July 2017. In an interview with Nylon, she said that the song is about "how in the 'real world', you still encounter the same bitchiness you thought you left behind at school." The accompanying lyric video for the track was made in collaboration with British designer and producer Chloe. She subsequently released an acoustic session performance of the track, which was premiered by the 405. In November 2017, Devine released her debut five-track EP Growing Pains, which was accompanied by a ten-minute visual that was directed by Emil Nava, who had previously collaborated with Rihanna and Selena Gomez. The majority of the film was shot in Newcastle.

Devine's second EP, Peer Pressure, was released on 16 November 2018 along with a short film, also directed by Emil Nava. "Peer Pressure", the lead single, opens with a line from the film Heathers (1989), and Devine spoke about her love of the coming-of-age film in an interview with The Line of Best Fit. Devine counts Charli XCX among her fans, and Charli's backing vocals feature on the track "Peer Pressure" after producer Justin Raisen played it to the pop star, who asked to record a version of it. The single was accompanied by a music video on her YouTube channel.

The same month the EP was released, YouTube Music announced Devine had been chosen to be on their Ones to Watch list for 2019 and BBC Radio 1 added L Devine's track "Nervous" to their BBC Music Introducing playlist. Tmrw magazine also released a special edition issue: L Devine by tmrw, entirely dedicated to and curated in partnership with Devine, and described the artist as "an extremely exciting pop talent who we believe is destined to be a global phenomenon".

In May 2019, Devine performed at the Great Escape Festival. On 17 May 2019, she released the single "Naked Alone". In an interview, she said "I actually wrote the song nearly two years ago. That's not usually the case, usually I just write them and then they come out over the next few months, but this one I've been sitting on for a while, just trying to find the right time to put it out, but it's time." In July 2019, two songs co-written by Devine were released after she signed with BMG on a songwriting contract; "Mean That Much" by Rudimental, and "Next Mistake" by Icona Pop. In 2020, Devine released two singles: "Boring People" and "Don't Say It". The songs were followed by the release of her third EP, Near Life Experience: Part 1, released on 30 July 2021. The EP was preceded by its lead single, "Girls Like Sex". She released the second part to the EP later that year.

After the release of the EPs, Devine left both her record label and management that she has been with since the beginning of her career. She admitted in an interview with the Official Charts Company that at the beginning of her career, she did not know the sound she wanted to make. However, after becoming independent and beginning work on a debut studio album, she felt that she was making music that felt true to her since she had "no outside opinions". After releasing the singles "Push it Down" and "Miscommunikaty", she announced the album, Digital Heartifacts, would be released in February 2024.

== Discography ==
=== Studio albums ===
Title	Details
Digital Heartifacts	Scheduled: 2 February 2024; Label: AWAL; Format: CD, vinyl, streaming, digital download

=== Extended plays ===
Title	Details
Growing Pains	Released: 17 November 2017; Label: Warner Bros; Format: Digital download
Peer Pressure	Released: 16 November 2018; Label: Warner Bros.; Format: CD, digital download
Near Life Experience: Part 1	Scheduled: 23 July 2021; Label: Warner Bros.
Near Life Experience: Part 2	Released: 24 September 2021; Label: Warner Bros.

=== Singles ===
==== As lead artist ====
Title	Year	Album
"School Girls"	2017	Growing Pains
"Peer Pressure"	2018	Peer Pressure
"Can't Be You"	2018	Peer Pressure
"Nervous"	2018	Peer Pressure
"Naked Alone"	2019	Near Life Experience: Part 1
"Peachy Keen"	2019	Near Life Experience: Part 2
"Boring People"	2020	Near Life Experience: Part 2
"Don't Say It"	2020	Near Life Experience: Part 1
"Girls Like Sex"	2021	Near Life Experience: Part 1
"Priorities"	2021	Near Life Experience: Part 1
"Push It Down"	2023	Digital Heartifacts
"Miscommunikaty"	2023	Digital Heartifacts
"Laundry Day"	2023	Digital Heartifacts
"Slippin Away"	2023	Digital Heartifacts

==== As featured artist ====
Title	Year	Album
"More Life" (Torren Foot featuring Tinie Tempah and L Devine)	2020	Non-album singles
"Sad Songs" (Route 94 featuring L Devine)	2020	Non-album singles

=== Songwriting credits ===
Title	Year	Artist(s)	Credits	Written with
"Be My Anime"	2018	Rat Boy	Co-writer; backing vocals	Jordan Cardy
"Mean That Much" (featuring Preditah and Morgan)	2019	Rudimental	Co-writer	Amir Izadkhah, Piers Aggett, Kesi Dryden, Leon Rolle, Nathan Chisanga
"Next Mistake"	2019	Icona Pop	Co-writer	Aino Jawo, Caroline Hjelt, James Napier, Maaike Kito Lebbing, Hudson Mohawke
"Come Over" (featuring Anne-Marie and Tion Wayne)	2020	Rudimental	Co-writer	Amir Izadkhah, Piers Aggett, Kesi Dryden, Leon Rolle, Anne-Marie Nicholson
"Rush Hour"	2025	XO	Co-writer	Harry Paynter

== Awards and nominations ==
Year	Organisation	Award	Work	Result
2020	NME	Essential New Artists for 2020	Herself	Included
