= Clique (XO song) =

2026 single by XO

Single by XO

from the EP Need to Know
- Released: 3 July 2026
- Genre: Pop
- Length: 1:51
- Label: Polydor
- Songwriters: Willow Kayne; Ryan Tedder; Ellrod
- Producers: Willow Kayne; Lindgren

XO singles chronology
"Hotline" (2025)	"Clique" (2026)	"Stacey (Take You Higher)" (2026)

Music video
- "Clique" on YouTube

"Clique" is a song recorded by British girl group XO. It was released on 3 July 2026 through Polydor Records as the second single from the group's second extended play, Need to Know (2026). The song was written for the group by Willow Kayne, Ryan Tedder and Ellrod, with Kayne and Lindgren handling the production.

A pop song, the lyrical content of "Clique" revolves around belonging to a sisterhood. The song was first performed in 2025 during XO's debut headline tour of the UK; an accompanying music video that referenced their audition and formation as a group was released alongside "Clique". The track was praised by critics, who enjoyed the harmonies, production and continued pop route that XO had taken with their music.

== Background and release ==
"Clique" was first performed on XO's debut headline tour of the UK in late 2025, after which NME confirmed it would be released as a single in the future. In March 2026, XO performed at the Gaydio Awards. At the ceremony, they debuted "Hotline", the lead single from their second extended play, Need to Know (2026). "Hotline" was released in April 2026. The release of "Clique" as the second single from the project followed on 3 July. They are set to promote the single at a London residency at Colours in Hoxton, as well as appearances at All Points East, G-A-Y and their headline tour, the Need to Know tour.

== Composition and music video ==
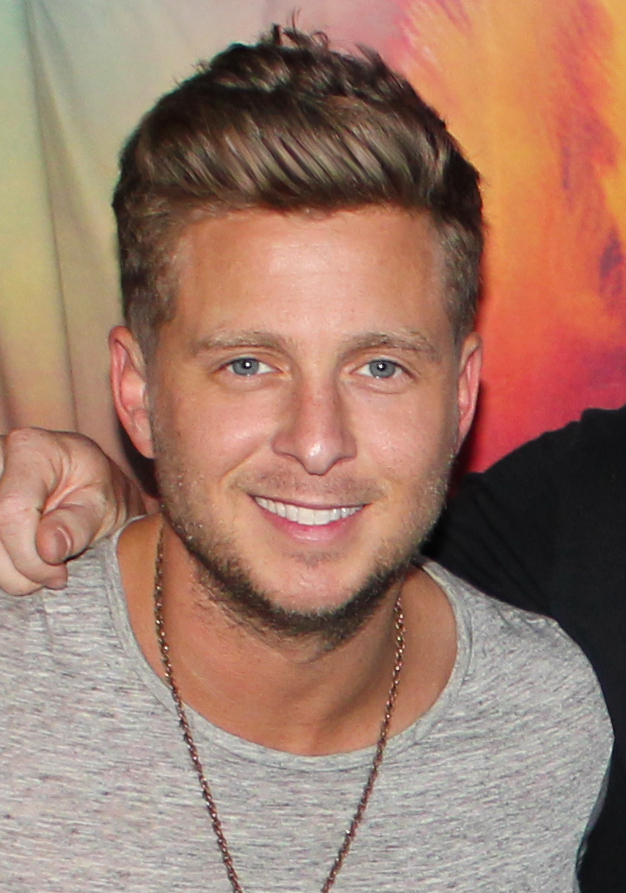
Ryan Tedder co-wrote "Clique".

"Clique" has been described as a pop song and was co-written by Willow Kayne, Ryan Tedder and Ellrod. The lyrical content of the song revolves around belonging to a sisterhood and encompasses British humour. An accompanying music video for "Clique" premiered alongside its release, directed by Oscar J Ryan and Ewan McIntosh. The video was said to have leaned into the group's real-life formation, with it being set in the audition room where the members initially met. However, it shows their journey into being "upgraded with sharper styling [...] and full-group confidence". The video features original polaroid photos from their early days as a group, as well as a choreographed dance break.

== Critical reception ==
NME billed "Clique" as an "exuberant, energetic and completely infectious" song. The Official Charts Company described "Clique" as a "girl power anthem". Fame felt "Clique" had helped XO to sharpen their "tight harmonies, swaggering pop, British humour, and real group chemistry". The publication also appreciated that the song showcased a revival of girl group energy "without slipping into nostalgia cosplay". CelebMix's Philip Logan praised the song and billed it as "a glossy, attitude-packed anthem". Logan also described XO's harmonies throughout the song as "razor-sharp", complimented the production of the track and felt that within their discography, it had marked "another confident step forward for one of the UK's fastest-rising pop acts". EQMusic's Mandy Rogers agreed with Logan's comments and noted that while fellow rising girl groups Say Now and Flo were embracing sounds rooted in R&B influences, XO had leaned "wholeheartedly into quintessential British pop". Rogers appreciated that with the release of "Clique", XO had continued to deliver songs that were "polished, hook-driven, full of personality, and refreshingly unafraid to celebrate classic pop songwriting".

== Credits and personnel ==
Credits adapted from Spotify.

- Summer Askew – vocals
- Shali Bordoni – vocals
- Zoe Miller – vocals
- Emmy Statham – vocals
- Reanna Sujeewon – vocals
- Willow Kayne – songwriting, production
- Lindgren – production, recording arranger, programming
- Ryan Tedder – songwriting
- Ellrod – songwriting
- Chris Young – vocal engineer
- Annabel Williams – vocal engineer
- Jay Reynolds – mixing and mastering engineer

== Release history ==
Region	Date	Format	Label	Ref.
Various	3 July 2025	Digital download; streaming	Polydor	
