= So Pure (Baby D song) =

1996 single by Baby D

Single by Baby D

from the album Deliverance
- Released: 1 January 1996
- Genre: Drum'n'bass; jungle; pop
- Length: 4:16
- Label: Production House; Systematic
- Songwriter: Terry Jones
- Producer: Nino

Baby D singles chronology
"(Everybody's Got to Learn Sometime) I Need Your Loving" (1995)	"So Pure" (1996)	"Take Me to Heaven" (1996)

Music video
- "So Pure" on YouTube

"So Pure" is a song by British musical group Baby D, released on 1 January 1996 as the sixth single from their only album, Deliverance (1996). It is written by group member Terry Jones and peaked at number three on the UK Singles Chart. The song was also a top-10 hit in Finland, while reaching the top-20 in Ireland and Scotland. On the Eurochart Hot 100, it reached number ten same month as it was released. A partially black-and-white music video was produced to promote the single.

== Critical reception ==
British columnist for Dotmusic, James Masterton noted "a thumping house piano coupled with what is actually quite a strong pop song." He added, "A big hit, but it will struggle to get much further in the fact of competition next week." Ross Jones from The Guardian commented, "The fabulous third single from the squeaky-voiced diva and maker of jungle for people who hate jungle but love glamorous melodies, vaguely familiar piano breaks, and copping off under strobe lights. 'So Pure' continues this fine tradition, and is packed with the finest synth noises known to man. Even before the Hoover solo towards the end, it's clear that this is sure to clean up."

Pan-European magazine Music & Media described it as "a more uptempo track, whose complicated intro might be edited by EHR programmers, but which should otherwise have no trouble following the success of the other singles." A reviewer from Music Week gave it a score of four out of five, adding, "Baby D prove once again that drum'n'bass can successfully blend with pop. Melodious piano breaks and an infectious vocal hook should ensure a well-deserved hit." James Hamilton from the Record Mirror Dance Update called it a "plaintively warbled plonking tuneful ditty". Ian Harrison from Select declared it as "a respectable neighbour" of Gloria Gaynor's 1978 hit, "I Will Survive".

== Track listing ==
- 12-inch, UK (1996)
1. "So Pure" (Original Mix)
2. "So Pure" (Greed's Euphorik Club Mix)
3. "So Pure" (Welcome To Planet Acen)
4. "So Pure" (Perplexer's House Of Unique Remix)
- CD single, France (1996)
1. "So Pure" (Digital Edit) — 4:16
2. "So Pure" (Greed's Euphorik Club Mix) — 7:11
3. "So Pure" (Perplexer House Of Unique Remix) — 5:35
- CD single, UK and Europe (1996)
1. "So Pure" (Digital Edit) — 4:16
2. "So Pure" (Welcome To Planet Acen) — 6:02
3. "So Pure" (Greed's Euphorik Club Mix) — 7:11
4. "Let Me Be Your Fantasy" (Live) — 6:34

== Charts ==
=== Weekly charts ===
Chart (1996)	Peak position
Australia (ARIA)	242
Europe (Eurochart Hot 100)	10
Europe (European Dance Radio)	23
Finland (Suomen virallinen lista)	10
Ireland (IRMA)	18
Israel (Israeli Singles Chart)	23
Latvia (Latvijas Top 30)	19
Scottish Singles Sales (Official Charts)	16
Sweden (Sverigetopplistan)	38
UK Singles (Official Charts)	3
UK Dance (Official Charts)	9
UK Airplay (Music Week)	22
UK Club Chart (Music Week)	2
UK Pop Tip Club Chart (Music Week)	1

=== Year-end charts ===
Chart (1996)	Position
Latvia (Latvijas Top 30)	187
