= Maegan Cottone =

American songwriter

- Also known as: Megatron
- Born: Alexandria, Virginia, U.S.
- Genres: Pop, R&B, Dance
- Occupations: Songwriter, singer, vocal producer, vocal arranger
- Instruments: Vocals, piano

Maegan Cottone (born July, 1981) is an American songwriter, singer, vocal producer and vocal arranger. In 2012, she signed to British publishing company Phrased Differently and managed by Wide Awake Music. She achieved international songwriting success in the US, France, UK, Germany, Denmark, Sweden and the Netherlands. Four of her songs have been top ten singles in the UK.

She is best known for her work on Little Mix's "Confetti", "Salute" and "Move", Jax Jones and Ella Henderson's "This is Real", Sigala and Becky Hill's "Wish You Well", and Olly Murs' "Up".

== Early life ==
Inspired by her mother's vinyl collection of Tamla Motown hits, Queen and Stevie Wonder songs, she began composing and writing at the piano from an early age. Maegan studied piano and classical voice after moving to London with her mother and sister from America at the age of nine.

== Musical career ==
Cottone has written three UK top ten singles: "Up" (No. 4 -Gold) for Olly Murs, "Move" (No. 3 -Gold) and "Salute" (No. 6 -Silver) for Little Mix. She also scored a Korean (No. 2) with "Red Light" for Kpop girl group f(x); and a Danish (No. 2 - double platinum) with "R.E.D." for Kongsted.
In 2014, Cottone arranged and vocal produced a cover of Cameo's "Word Up!" (produced by TMS), the official Sport Relief Single of 2014. The song features vocals from Little Mix, who Cottone has worked with several times - including appointments as vocal director and musical director of the group's Radio 1 Live Lounge, and vocal director on their Salute Tour. Cottone also wrote the song "The Humblest Start" for the Street Dance 3D soundtrack. Performed by LP & JC, her vocals are also featured.

Cottone has worked with artists and producers worldwide such as Ella Henderson, DJ Mustard, Babyface, Chase & Status, TMS, Cutfather, White N3rd, Melissa Steel, Tamera Foster, Shea Taylor, Tara McDonald, Wayne Wilkins, Red Triangle and Komi.

== Songwriting and vocal production credits ==
	indicates a vocal production contribution only
	indicates a songwriting contribution only
^	indicates a production credit in addition to a songwriting credit

Year	Title	Artist	Album
2012	"8 Days a Week"	Jean Roch featuring Timati	Music Saved My Life
2012	"Fly"	Mark With A K featuring Maegan Cottone	—N/a
2012	"Give Me More"	Tara McDonald	—N/a
2013	"Salute" ^	Little Mix	Salute
2013	"Move" ^	Little Mix	Salute
2013	"Little Me"	Little Mix	Salute
2013	"Nothing Feels Like You"	Little Mix	Salute
2013	"Towers"	Little Mix	Salute
2013	"Competition" ^	Little Mix	Salute
2013	"These Four Walls"	Little Mix	Salute
2013	"About the Boy"	Little Mix	Salute
2013	"Boy"	Little Mix	Salute
2013	"Good Enough"	Little Mix	Salute
2013	"Mr. Loverboy"	Little Mix	Salute
2013	"A Different Beat"	Little Mix	Salute
2013	"See Me Now"	Little Mix	Salute
2013	"They Just Don't Know You"	Little Mix	Salute
2013	"Stand Down"	Little Mix	Salute
2013	"Little Me (Unplugged)"	Little Mix	Salute
2013	"Shooting Star"	Tara McDonald featuring Zaho	Contagieuse
2013	"The Greatest"	Mell Tierra featuring Maegan Cottone	—N/a
2014	"Up"	Olly Murs featuring Demi Lovato	Never Been Better
2014	"Word Up!"	Little Mix	—N/a
2014	"Red Light"	f(x)	Red Light
2014	"R.E.D."	Kongsted	—N/a
2015	"Pretty Girls"	Britney Spears and Iggy Azalea	—N/a
2015	"Black Magic"	Little Mix	Get Weird
2015	"Weird People"	Little Mix	Get Weird
2015	"Secret Love Song ft. Jason Derulo"	Little Mix	Get Weird
2015	"Hair"	Little Mix	Get Weird
2015	"Grown"	Little Mix	Get Weird
2015	"I Love You"	Little Mix	Get Weird
2015	"OMG" ^	Little Mix	Get Weird
2015	"Lightning" ^	Little Mix	Get Weird
2015	"A.D.I.D.A.S." ^	Little Mix	Get Weird
2015	"I Won't"	Little Mix	Get Weird
2015	"Secret Love Song, Pt. II"	Little Mix	Get Weird
2015	"Clued Up"	Little Mix	Get Weird
2016	"Write Our Names (ft. Post Malone)"	Moxie Raia	931 Reloaded
2016	"Shout Out to My Ex"	Little Mix	Glory Days
2016	"Touch"	Little Mix	Glory Days
2016	"F.U" ^	Little Mix	Glory Days
2016	"Power (ft. Stormzy)"	Little Mix	Glory Days
2016	"Oops (ft. Charlie Puth)"	Little Mix	Glory Days
2016	"Down & Dirty" ^	Little Mix	Glory Days
2016	"Your Love"	Little Mix	Glory Days
2016	"Private Show"	Little Mix	Glory Days
2016	"Freak"	Little Mix	Glory Days
2016	"Touch (Acoustic)"	Little Mix	Glory Days
2017	"Reggaetón Lento (Remix)"	Little Mix	Glory Days: The Platinum Edition
2018	"Strip (ft. Sharaya J)"	Little Mix	LM5
2018	"Monster in Me"	Little Mix	LM5
2018	"Woman's World"	Little Mix	LM5
2018	"Only You (with Cheat Codes)"	Little Mix	LM5
2018	"Monday Blues"	EXO-CBX	Blooming Days
2019	"This Is Real"	Jax Jones and Ella Henderson	Snacks
2019	"Wish You Well"	Sigala and Becky Hill	Get to Know
2020	"Confetti ft. Saweetie" ^	Little Mix	Confetti
2020	"Happiness"	Little Mix	Confetti
2020	"Not a Pop Song"	Little Mix	Confetti
2020	"Gloves Up"	Little Mix	Confetti
2020	"Monday Blues"	Kylie Minogue	Disco
2020	"Supernova"	Kylie Minogue	Disco
2020	"Last Chance"	Kylie Minogue	Disco
2020	"Dance Floor Darling"	Kylie Minogue	Disco
2020	"Celebrate You"	Kylie Minogue	Disco
2020	"Fine Wine"	Kylie Minogue	Disco
2020	"Hey Lonely"	Kylie Minogue	Disco
2021	"I Choose You"	AJ Mitchell	SKYVIEW
2022	"21 Reasons" ^	Nathan Dawe (ft. Ella Henderson)	n/a
2023	"React" ^	Switch Disco and Ella Henderson	n/a
2023	"0800 Heaven" ^	Ella Henderson, Joel Corry and Nathan Dawe	n/a
2024	"Under the Sun" ^	Switch Disco and Ella Henderson	n/a
2025	"Real Friends"	XO	Fashionably Late
2025	"Ibelongiiu"	G-Dragon	Übermensch
2026	"XO"	XO	Need to Know

== See also ==
- "Word Up!" Little Mix cover
- "Red Light" by f(x)
- "Salute" album credits
