= Deliverance (Baby D album) =

Studio album by Baby D
- Released: 8 February 1996
- Genre: Breakbeat hardcore; house; jungle; rave
- Label: Systematic

Deliverance is the only album by English breakbeat hardcore and house music group Baby D, released in 1996 by Systematic Records. It includes their 1994 UK number one single "Let Me Be Your Fantasy", plus the subsequent two singles which both reached number three, "(Everybody's Got to Learn Sometime) I Need Your Loving" and "So Pure". Also included are the earlier singles "Destiny" (No. 69), a live version of "Casanova" (No. 67), and the 1996 single "Take Me to Heaven" (No. 15).

A two disc, five track version of the album was also made available. The second disc of this version contains a further studio track and remixes by Acen and the Prodigy.

== Critical reception ==
Professional ratings
Review scores
Source	Rating
AllMusic	3/5 stars
The Encyclopedia of Popular Music	3/5 stars
The Guardian	3/5 stars
Music Week	5/5 stars
Muzik	2.5/5 stars
Select	3/5 stars

Caroline Sullivan from The Guardian commented, "Dance music often fails to credit women vocalists adequately, so this jungle trio's decision to call themselves after their singer is laudable. It's appropriate, too, the Babe's ladylike tones being the key to their pop-friendly tunes." Taylor Parkes from Melody Maker said, "There's nothing heavy-handed or hard-headed here, just 12 unexpected, exceptional, graceful, thoroughly modern pop songs, each a caught glimpse of what happens when you stop thinking of pop as some kind of responsibility, an heirloom, in any way delicate. Romantic. Modernist. As dizzy as lying in bed listening to cars; as intense as you feel." Pan-European magazine Music & Media wrote, "Former champions of the UK dance charts, these three musicians from London have crossed over to the UK chart big time. Which is not surprising, considering they make intelligent, innovative dance music." A reviewer for Music Week rated the album five out of five, adding, "Innovative mixes of trippy textures, blippy electronics, strong melodies and polished vocals have given Baby D three huge hit singles. This debut album delivers more of the same."

== Track listing ==
No.	Title	Writer(s)	Length
1.	"Got to Believe"	Matt Lightbourn; Matthew Orr; Mario Galdes	5:33
2.	"So Pure"	Terry Jones	7:02
3.	"Destiny"	Floyd Dyce	4:02
4.	"Come into My World"	Baby D; Jamal	5:50
5.	"Casanova" (live)	Jo Armstead; Milton Middlebrook	4:02
6.	"Winds of Love"	Jones	4:43
7.	"(Everybody's Got to Learn Sometime) I Need Your Loving"	James Warren	5:37
8.	"Daydreaming"	Dyce	5:19
9.	"Euphoria"	Jones; Dyce	6:49
10.	"Nature's Warning"	Lightbourn; Orr; M. Galdes; Claudio Galdes	6:31
11.	"Take Me to Heaven"	Dyce	5:06
12.	"Let Me Be Your Fantasy"	Dyce	7:50

Limited edition bonus disc

No.	Title	Writer(s)	Length
1.	"Have It All"	Baby D; Jamal; Ozzie Henderson	4:17
2.	"Daydreaming" (Acenhallucination)	Dyce	5:21
3.	"Casanova" (Prodigy Pump Action Remix)	Armstead; Middlebrook	4:57
4.	"So Pure" (Rollin' Mix)	Jones	5:16

Note

- Track 2 is a remix by Acen.
- Track 3 is a remix by the Prodigy.

== Charts ==
Chart performance for Deliverance
Chart (1996)	Peak position
Swiss Albums (Schweizer Hitparade)	47
UK Albums (OCC)	5
