= Tongue 'n' Cheek =

British music group

- Origin: United Kingdom
- Genres: Electro, dance
- Years active: 1987–1992
- Labels: EMI Records
- Past members: Conor Col Henry; Maureen Mason; Junior Williams

Tongue 'n' Cheek were a British electro music group formed by Robin Achampong and Delroy Murray of Total Contrast, that were primarily popular in the UK club scene between 1987 and 1992. The group's members were Conor Col Henry, Maureen Mason and Junior Williams.

== Overview ==
All of the group's eight singles charted on the UK Singles Chart, however they were more noticeable on the UK Dance Chart. All of the group's four singles released by EMI entered the top ten of the UK Dance Chart with their album reaching No. 3 on the UK Album Dance Chart.

The group's biggest UK chart hit single was "Tomorrow", which spent weeks in the charts and peaked at No. 20. It was remixed by Chicago DJ Frankie Knuckles. Follow-up singles included "Nobody" (UK #37) and "Forget Me Nots" (UK #26), a cover of the Patrice Rushen song remixed by electronic music producers DNA, best known for the remix of Suzanne Vega's UK top 5 single "Tom's Diner". The group also had an album, This Is Tongue 'N' Cheek, which reached No. 45 on the UK Albums Chart.

The band appeared on the BBC show Top of the Pops twice with singles "Forget Me Nots" and "Tomorrow", and also appeared on various TV shows including This Morning with Richard and Judy, The Derek Jameson Show, The Hit Man and Her and were regulars on The Chart Show.

At the end of 1990, Tongue 'n' Cheek had one of the top 100 best-selling UK dance singles ahead of American groups Bell Biv DeVoe and Hi-Five.

The band regularly performed touring Europe with various UK R&B acts of the time such as Soul II Soul, the Pasadenas, Dina Carroll, Glen Goldsmith and supported the band Imagination on their UK tour.

Tongue 'n' Cheek's single "Tomorrow" appeared on the Now That's What I Call Music 17 album which went platinum, selling over 300,000 copies. The band have also appeared on compilation albums which have sold over two million copies worldwide.

The lyrical content from "Tomorrow" was sampled by house music group Love Decade on their 1996 single "Is This a Dream" which reached No. 39 on the UK Singles Chart. The lyrical content from "Nobody (Can Love Me)" was sampled by Acen. The lyrics – albeit speeded up and altered, formed part of Acen's darkcore single "Trip II the Moon", which reached No. 38 on the UK Singles Chart in August 1992.

== Discography ==
=== Albums ===
Year	Album	UK
1990	This Is Tongue 'N' Cheek	45

=== Singles ===
Year	Song	UK
1987	"Don't Stop the Love"	99
1988	"Nobody (Can Love Me)"	59
1988	"Why"	77
1989	"Encore"	41
1990	"Tomorrow"	20
1990	"Nobody"	37
1991	"Forget Me Nots"	26
