= Digital Heartifacts =

Studio album by L Devine
- Released: 2 February 2024
- Length: 35:34
- Label: AWAL
- Producer: Olivia Devine; Jay Flew

L Devine chronology
Near Life Experience: Part 2 (2021)	Digital Heartifacts (2024)

Singles from Digital Heartifacts
- 1. "Push It Down" Released: 24 April 2023; 2. "Miscommunikaty" Released: 20 July 2023; 3. "Laundry Day" Released: 29 August 2023; 4. "Slippin Away" Released: 6 October 2023

Professional ratings
Review scores
Source	Rating
The Line of Best Fit	8/10 stars

Digital Heartifacts is the debut studio album by the English singer and songwriter L Devine, released on 2 February 2024 by AWAL.

== Background ==
After the release of her extended play (EP) Near Life Experience: Part 2, Devine made the decision to part ways with her former label, Warner Records. The first single from the project, titled "Push It Down", was released on 24 April 2023, accompanied by a music video. Following that, the second single, "Misscommunikaty", was released on 20 July 2023. Devine described the song as being "about feeling disconnected in an overly connected world". On 29 August 2023, the album was announced for pre-order, coinciding with the release of its third single, "Laundry Day". A fourth single, "Slippin Away", was released on 6 October 2023.

== Track listing ==
All tracks are written by Olivia Devine and Jay Flew, except where noted.

Digital Heartifacts track listing
No.	Title	Writer(s)	Length
1.	"Eaten Alive"		3:03
2.	"Push It Down"		2:57
3.	"Slippin Away"	Flew	3:07
4.	"If I Don't Laugh I'll Cry"		2:52
5.	"Miscommunikaty"		2:01
6.	"PMO"		2:49
7.	"Worship"	Devine; Flew; Neave Applebaum; Sam O'Neil	3:02
8.	"Placeholder"		3:41
9.	"Bully"		3:39
10.	"On and Off"	Devine; Flew; Joe Thompson	2:30
11.	"Hater"		2:44
12.	"Laundry Day"		3:09
Total length:			35:34

== Personnel ==
- Olivia Devine – lead vocals (all tracks), production (tracks 1, 5, 7, 11)
- Jay Flew – production
- Barry Grint – mastering
- Nathan Boddy – mixing
- Gabi King – drums (tracks 2–4, 10)
- Joe Atkinson – piano (track 2)

== Charts ==
Chart performance for Digital Heartifacts
Chart (2024)	Peak position
UK Independent Albums (OCC)	24

== Release history ==
Release dates and formats for Digital Heartifacts
Region	Date	Format(s)	Label	Ref.
Various	2 February 2024	CD; digital download; LP; streaming	AWAL	
