= Kongsted =

Danish DJ and music producer

Kongsted is a Danish DJ and music producer. He has won award for "Best DJ for Dance Mainstream" for both 2010 and 2011.

== Discography ==
=== Albums ===
Year	Album	Peak positions	Certification
Year	Album	DEN	Certification
2013	Welcome to My Universe	38	

=== Singles and EPs ===
Year	Single	Peak positions	Album
Year	Single	DEN	Album
2012	"Good Times"	22	Welcome to My Universe
2013	"Live Your Life (Good Times)" (featuring Chayse)	29	Welcome to My Universe
2013	"Chuck Norris"	8	Welcome to My Universe
2013	"Light in the Dark"	9	Welcome to My Universe
2014	"Drunk Smiley Guy"	—	Welcome to My Universe
2014	"R.E.D."	5	non-album single
2015	"Whine Dat"	11	TBA
2016	"Wild Child" (feat. Cisilia)	14	TBA
2017	"Say My Name"	36	TBA
2019	"Stand Up, Stand Out! (Official song of the IHF Men's Handbal World Championship Germany/Denmark 2019)" (with Dominik Klein)	—	TBA
"—" marks a release that didn't have a peak position.
