= Hotline (XO song) =

2026 single by XO

Single by XO

from the EP Need to Know
- Released: 24 April 2026
- Length: 2:44
- Label: Polydor
- Songwriters: Summer Askew; Shali Bordoni; Zoe Miller; Emmy Statham; Reanna Sujeewon; NUTU; Lindgren; Maegan Cottone; Megan Elizabeth Gallagher; Harry Paynter
- Producers: NUTU; Lindgren

XO singles chronology
"Candy" (2025)	"Hotline" (2026)	"Clique" (2026)

Music video
- "Hotline" on YouTube

"Hotline" is a song recorded by British girl group XO. It was released on 24 April 2026 through Polydor Records as the lead single from the group's second extended play, Need to Know (2026). The lyrical content of the song features around an advice centre for getting over an ex, while dissecting themes of friendship and sisterhood.

== Background and release ==
In March 2026, XO performed at the Gaydio Awards. At the ceremony, they debuted "Hotline", which was unreleased at the time. The release date was later confirmed for 24 April 2026 and it was confirmed that it was the lead single from their second EP, Need to Know (2026). It was released alongside an accompanying music video.

== Composition and lyrics ==
The lyrical content of "Hotline" centres on an advice centre for getting over an ex, while dissecting themes of friendship and sisterhood that were also shown in XO's prior releases. totalNtertainment described "Hotline" as having "ludicrously catchy melodies" and "heavy, Timbaland-style beats." along with having "quintessentially British humour".

"Hotline", the first release for XO since Fashionably Late, felt like a "reintroduction" for XO. With their first release, they felt they had established their friendships within the group. For this one, they wanted to focus on their individual characteristics. Despite having "Hotline" and other unreleased tracks at the time of their debut EP, they had a set release schedule they wanted to follow. Sujeewon explained: "We've been sitting on a lot of these tracks for a really long time, even since the first EP, because we knew the journey that we wanted to take. We've come into this year with a 'boom!'; we know what we're releasing, we're just excited to get it all out". She also confirmed that they had received the track as a demo, but completely changed it as a group, including rewrites of the lyrics and Miller adding the bridge.

== Critical reception ==
The Line of Best Fit billed the choreography in its music video as XO's "most ambitious" to date yet, with totalNtertainment describing it as feeling "distinctively their own". Fame echoed praise for the dancing shown in the music video, as well as appreciating the identity XO had shown in the song. Placing them in their Future of Music listicle, Rolling Stone UK wrote that "Hotline" is an "all-out banger".

== Credits and personnel ==
Credits adapted from Spotify.

- Summer Askew – vocals, songwriting
- Shali Bordoni – vocals, songwriting
- Zoe Miller – vocals, songwriting
- Emmy Statham – vocals, songwriting
- Reanna Sujeewon – vocals, songwriting
- NUTU – songwriting, production, recording arranger
- Lindgren – songwriting, production, recording arranger, programming
- Maegan Cottone – songwriting, vocal production
- Megan Elizabeth Gallagher – songwriting, backing vocals
- Harry Paynter – songwriting
- Chris Young – vocal engineer
- Kevin Granger – mixing and mastering engineer

== Release history ==
Region	Date	Format	Label	Ref.
Various	24 April 2026	Digital download; streaming	Polydor	
