= M-22 (duo) =

British-German DJ and producer duo

- Origin: United Kingdom; Germany
- Genres: Dance; pop
- Years active: 2015–present
- Labels: 3Beat/Republic
- Members: Matt James; Frank Sanders
- Website: m-22official.com

M-22 are a British-German DJ and producer duo consisting of Matt James and Frank Sanders. On March 22, the duo met, through a joint production, which is the reason for their stage name.

== History ==
On March 22, 2015, the duo met during a joint production in Canada. James and Sanders liked each other instantly. On the same day, they produced their first single, "Good to Be Loved". In April 2015, the duo released the track "Sometime" which peaked in the UK Club Chart at #6. The song was selected by the Sarah-Jane Crawford Show (BBC1 Xtra) as 'Record of the Week'. Their debut single was released on 22 May 2015 and reached the iTunes Top 50 chart. On EDM.com, the song made it to #5 on its chart. Several DJs supported the track; Tiësto, Don Diablo and Robin Schulz played the song several times in their radio shows.

Robin Schulz worked with M-22 and produced the song "Love Me Loud" featuring Aleesia. The song was included in Schulz' 15-track album Sugar, released in August 2015.

The duo produced remixes for Avicii, Sigala, Sigma, Axwell & Ingrosso, Deepend and Sam Feldt.

Alongside Axwell and Ingrosso, they played at the Refune Label Night in Ibiza in August 2016. In October 2016, they reached gold status in Sweden for their single, "Somewhere New".

== Discography ==
=== Singles ===
Title	Year	Peak chart positions							Certifications
Title	Year	UK	UK Dance	IRE	ITA	SCO	SWE	GER	Certifications
"Some Time"	2015	—	—	—	—	—	—	—	
"Good to Be Loved"	2015	—	—	—	—	—	—	49	
"Inspiration"	2015	—	—	—	—	—	—	—	
"Somewhere New" (Klingande featuring M-22)	2016	—	—	—	100	—	35	—	
"First Time" (featuring Medina)	2017	20	3	23	—	16	—	—	BPI: Platinum
"How Does It Feel"	2018	—	—	—	—	—	—	—	BPI: Silver
"White Lies"	2019	—	—	—	—	—	—	—	BPI: Silver
"After Hours" (with Kiara Nelson)	2019	—	—	—	—	—	—	—	BPI: Silver
"Can't Stop Loving You"	2020	—	—	—	—	—	—	—	
"Think About Us" (featuring Lorne)	2020	—	—	—	—	—	—	—	
"Gravity" (featuring Rhea Melvin)	2021	—	—	—	—	—	—	—	
"Need You There"	2021	—	—	—	—	—	—	—	
"Heartstrings" (with Ella Henderson)	2022	—	—	—	—	—	—	—	
"The One" (featuring Blair)	2023	—	—	—	—	—	—	—	
"—" denotes releases that did not chart or were not released to that country.

=== Other appearances ===
Title	Year	Album(s)	Artist
"Love Me Loud"	2015	Sugar	Robin Schulz and M-22 featuring Aleesia

=== Remixes ===
2018

- Tiësto and Dzeko featuring Preme and Post Malone — "Jackie Chan" (M-22 Remix)

2019

- Dimitri Vegas & Like Mike featuring Era Istrefi - "Selfish" (M-22 Remix)
- Jonas Blue featuring Theresa Rex - "What I Like About You" (M-22 Remix)
- Loïc Nottet - "On Fire" (M-22 Remix)
- Little Mix - "Bounce Back" (M-22 Remix)

2020

- Bow Anderson - "Sweater" (M-22 Remix)
- Katy Perry - "Smile" (M-22 Remix)

2021

- Craig David and MNEK - "Who You Are" (M-22 Remix)
