= First Time (M-22 song) =

Single by M-22 featuring Medina
- Released: 8 December 2017
- Genre: Electronic, dance, pop
- Length: 3:08
- Label: 3 Beat
- Songwriters: Adrien Nookadu; Andre Nookadu; Arlissa Ruppert; Frank Buelles; Matt James
- Producer: M-22

M-22 singles chronology
"Somewhere New" (2016)	"First Time" (2017)	"How Does It Feel" (2018)

Medina singles chronology
"Beautiful" (2017)	"First Time" (2017)	"Skyttegrav" (2018)

"First Time" is a song recorded by British-German DJ and record producing duo M-22 and Danish singer Medina. The song was released by 3 Beat Records on 8 December 2017. It reached number 20 on the UK Singles Chart on 13 July 2018, becoming Medina's first entry on the chart since "You and I" in 2009 and her highest-charting single in the United Kingdom.

== Music video ==
An audio-video to accompany the release of "First Time" was first released onto YouTube on 8 December 2017, through 3 Beat's official YouTube account.

== Track listing ==
Digital download
No.	Title	Length
1.	"First Time" (featuring Medina)	3:08

== Charts ==
=== Weekly charts ===
Chart (2018)	Peak position
Belgium Dance (Ultratop Flanders)	14
Ireland (IRMA)	23
Poland (Polish Airplay Top 100)	35
Scotland Singles (OCC)	16
UK Singles (OCC)	20
UK Dance (OCC)	3

=== Year-end charts ===
Chart (2018)	Position
UK Singles (Official Charts Company)	78

== Certifications ==
Region	Certification	Certified units/sales
United Kingdom (BPI)	Platinum	600,000^{‡}
^{‡} Sales+streaming figures based on certification alone.

== Release history ==
Country	Date	Format	Label	Ref.
United Kingdom	8 December 2017	Digital download	3 Beat	
