= Acen Razvi =

English breakbeat hardcore/techno music producer

Acen Razvi is an English breakbeat hardcore/techno music producer. Acen was known for tracks such as "Close Your Eyes", "Window in the Sky" and "Trip II the Moon" (the latter two both 1992). He worked for the Production House Records stable, which also brought fame to Baby D. He released the album 75 Minutes.

He has also collaborated with Baby D's Floyd Dyce to form The House Crew.

He is now a filmmaker, specialising in short films under the name Acen Films Limited to be shown at festivals. Besides producing dance music tracks, his aim is to fuse art forms and to introduce pioneering visual and musical perceptions to new audiences.

== Critical reception ==
In 1999, Tom Ewing of Freaky Trigger described Razvi as "the most underrated act of the decade": "His series of 12″ singles, tossed out into the seething dance marketplace of '92–'93, are without exception stunning. Acen is the lushest, and most lyrical, of the great hardcore producers, and if his gleeful inventiveness and wicked way with a sample are more typical of the time, that just goes to show what an unbelievable time it was. More than anyone else making records, Acen for me encompasses the beauty, velocity and freedom of hardcore." In his list of the "Top 100 Singles of the 90s", "Trip II the Moon (Part 2)" was ranked at number 23 and "Close Your Eyes (Optikonfusion!)" was ranked at number 44, while "Window in the Sky" almost featured on the list.

In 2020 The Guardian newspaper ranked his "Trip II the Moon" at number 2 in its list of "The greatest hardcore rave tracks".

== Partial discography ==
- "Trip II the Moon" (re-mix) (1992) UK No. 71
- "Trip II the Moon" (1992) UK No. 38
- "Window in the Sky" (1992) UK No. 88
- Collaborated with Dice on "When the Lion Awakes" by The Brother's Grimm – Exodus (1992)
- 75 Minutes (1994)
- Licka (EP) (2002)
