= Lovesick (XO song) =

2025 single by XO

Single by XO

from the EP Fashionably Late
- Released: 19 September 2025
- Genre: Electropop
- Length: 2:38
- Label: Polydor
- Songwriters: Grace Barker; Willow Kayne; Gil Lewis
- Producer: Gil Lewis

XO singles chronology
"Lovesick" (2025)	"Real Friends" (2025)

Music video
- "Lovesick" on YouTube

"Lovesick" is the debut single by British girl group XO. It was written by Grace Barker, Willow Kayne and Gil Lewis, with production handled by Lewis. The single was released on 19 September 2025 through Polydor Records as the lead single from the group's debut extended play, Fashionably Late (2025). The lyrical content of "Lovesick" explores unexpectedly becoming attracted to someone on a night out and experiencing love as a young person in the digital age.

"Lovesick" was initially not intended to be XO's debut single, with the group having already formed a track listing for Fashionably Late, but they felt it would "set the tone" for their later releases. "Lovesick" was described by Clash magazine as a "titanic debut single" that allowed each member of the group to introduce themselves, with Wonderland billing it a "pulsating electropop anthem". It was also nominated for Song of the Year at the 2025 CelebMix Awards.

== Background and release ==
XO were formed for Polydor Records in late 2024, composed of members Summer Askew, Shali Bordoni, Zoe Miller, Emmy Statham and Reanna Sujeewon. XO's initial release, "Ponytail", was released in August 2025 as a promotional single. It was then confirmed that a first official single would then be released. "Lovesick" was then released as their debut single on 19 September 2025, alongside an accompanying music video. "Lovesick" was pitched to XO when they had already formed a track listing for their debut extended play (EP); it sat at roughly 7 songs at the time. However, they wanted the track to be their debut single since they felt it expressed the core theme of the EP.

== Composition and lyrics ==
"Lovesick" has been described as an electropop song that features "personality-packed vocals and a tender chorus". It was written by Grace Barker, Willow Kayne and Gil Lewis; the latter also handled the production of the track. The lyrical content of the song explores "ephemeral symptoms" of unexpectedly becoming attracted to someone on a night out and kissing them on a night bus. Its lyrics also dissect the feeling of falling in love whilst growing up in the digital age, with references to raw and imperfect love. An "unapologetic take on modern girl power", Askew felt that "Lovesick" had "set the tone" for the group's further releases.

== Critical reception ==
"Lovesick" was described by Clash magazine as a "titanic debut single" with "irresistibly catchy" arrangements that allowed each member of the group to introduce themselves, with Wonderland billing it a "pulsating electropop anthem". Music Mafia appreciated the lyrical content of the song and found that whilst inherently a romantic song, it could be universally applied to friendship, sisterhood and "XO's thoroughly Gen Z vision of Girl Power".

The chorus, which mentions kissing on a night bus, gained attention from BBC East Midlands as they appreciated the lyric. CelebMix billed the song "innovative, relatable, effortlessly catchy, full of attitude, and impossible not to love". CelebMix later nominated it for Song of the Year at their annual award ceremony.

== Credits and personnel ==
Credits adapted from Spotify.

- Summer Askew – vocals
- Shali Bordoni – vocals
- Zoe Miller – vocals
- Emmy Statham – vocals
- Reanna Sujeewon – vocals
- Gil Lewis – songwriting, production, programming
- Willow Kayne – songwriting
- Grace Barker – songwriting
- Jay Reynolds – mixing, mastering

== Release history ==
Region	Date	Format	Label	Ref.
Various	19 September 2025	Digital download; streaming	Polydor	
