= XO (group) =

British girl group

- Origin: London, England
- Genres: Pop; electropop; dance-pop
- Years active: 2024–present
- Label: Polydor
- Members: Summer Askew; Shali Bordoni; Zoe Miller; Emmy Statham; Reanna Sujeewon
- Website: www.xoofficial.co.uk

XO are a British girl group consisting of members Summer Askew, Shali Bordoni, Zoe Miller, Emmy Statham and Reanna Sujeewon. They were formed by Polydor Records in 2024 and released their debut single, "Lovesick", in September 2025. They later embarked on a headline tour across the United Kingdom, with another set for 2026. XO's first extended play, Fashionably Late, was released in November 2025. October 2026 saw them release their follow-up, Need to Know.

== History ==
Colin Barlow formed XO for Polydor Records in late 2024, choosing members Summer Askew, Shali Bordoni, Zoe Miller, Emmy Statham and Reanna Sujeewon. The members originate from Liverpool, Hong Kong, Essex, Derby and London, respectively. They have stated that they knew each other prior to being put in the group, from various auditions and projects they had done together. The members recalled their experience auditioning for the group, having seen a "very vague" advertisement in The Stage that read: "Can you sing and dance? Do you like the Pussycat Dolls?". None of them knew what to expect and were shocked to be placed in a girl group by the end of the audition day. The advertisement also asked for auditionees to be aged between 16 and 19; some of the members eventually chosen were above the asked age, but attended regardless. Miller stated that the audition was chaotic, with numerous people cut throughout the day after their singing and dancing. She also estimated that around 140 girls had shown up at first.

In 2025, they embarked on a tour of schools across the United Kingdom, performing to schoolchildren and hosting discussions around mental health, body image and aspirations. Askew has admitted that the group were sceptical of the school tour, since they had no fanbase and little music to work with at the time. However, they became grateful for the experience since they found the travelling had helped them to bond. XO's initial release, "Ponytail", was released in August 2025, before their first official single, "Lovesick", a month later. "Lovesick" was written by Willow Kayne and Gracey. It was described by Clash magazine as a "titanic debut single" with "irresistibly catchy" arrangements that allowed each member of the group to introduce themselves, with Wonderland billing it a "pulsating electropop anthem".

XO made their television debut on the CBBC live magazine series Saturday Mash-Up! in September 2025. As well as performing "Ponytail", they also made a cameo on a sketch. Whilst receiving airplay from BBC East Midlands, where Statham is from, the station confirmed that XO's debut extended play (EP) would be titled Fashionably Late. In a piece written by the Sunday Times, they confirmed the release was scheduled for November 2025 and featured songs co-written by Charli XCX and Lostboy. "Real Friends", co-written by Charli XCX, was released as a single in October 2025. The song was produced by John Ryan and Mattias Larsson. XO embarked on their first headline tour across the United Kingdom in October 2025; it saw them perform all of the songs from Fashionably Late, as well as "Clique", an unreleased track. The EP was released on 14 November 2025. "Candy" became their third single on the day of the EP's release. December 2025 saw them release a cover of the Justin Bieber Christmas song "Mistletoe".

In March 2026, XO performed at the Gaydio Awards. In June, they made their festival debut at the Isle of Wight Festival, as well as being booked for the Discovery Festival in Darlington and All Points East in August of that year. Also throughout August, XO held a residency in Colours, Hoxton, in promotion of Need to Know, a "mini-album" composed of seven songs. Released on 16 October, it was preceded by "Hotline", which they debuted at the Gaydio Awards. "Clique" was released as the second single in July, followed by "Stacey (Take You Higher)" in September. The group further promoted Need to Know with numerous shows at G-A-Y in Heaven and supporting Turkish girl group Manifest at Wembley Arena.

== Artistry ==
XO have cited Spice Girls, Tate McRae and Katseye as musical influences. They have also been likened to Blackpink due to incorporating the "new wave of all-choreo" into their performances, with the group stating that they always consider choreography whilst making their music. They were also compared to Sugababes for their "edge". Upon the release of Fashionably Late, they were likened to Gwen Stefani, the Pussycat Dolls, Fergie and Girls Aloud. Following Need to Know, they cited Little Mix as inspirations for their career; the EP also included a demo originally recorded by Little Mix member Perrie Edwards. They also stated that Madonna had inspired them and countless other women in the music industry, noting that she "set the pace for women".

== Discography ==
=== Extended plays ===
List of extended plays, with selected details
Title	Details
Fashionably Late	Released: 14 November 2025; Label: Polydor; Format: Digital download, streaming
Need to Know	Released: 16 October 2026; Label: Polydor; Format: Digital download, streaming

=== Singles ===
List of singles as lead artist, showing year released
Title	Year	Album
"Lovesick"	2025	Fashionably Late
"Real Friends"	2025	Fashionably Late
"Candy"	2025	Fashionably Late
"Hotline"	2026	Need To Know
"Clique"	2026	Need To Know
"Stacey (Take You Higher)"	2026	Need To Know

=== Promotional singles ===
List of promotional singles
Title	Year	Album
"Ponytail"	2025	Fashionably Late

=== Music videos ===
Main artist music videos
Title	Year	Originating album
"Ponytail"	2025	Fashionably Late
"Lovesick"	2025	Fashionably Late
"Real Friends"	2025	Fashionably Late
"Candy"	2025	Fashionably Late
"Mistletoe" (visualiser)	2025	Non-album single
"Silly Boy" (visualiser)	2026	Fashionably Late
"Rush Hour" (visualiser)	2026	Fashionably Late
"Hotline"	2026	Need to Know
"Clique"	2026	Need to Know
"Stacey (Take You Higher)"	2026	Need to Know

== Tours ==
- United Kingdom Tour (2025)

== Awards and nominations ==
Year	Organisation	Category	Nominee(s)/work(s)	Result	Ref.
2025	CelebMix Awards	Breakout Artist	XO	Won	
2025	CelebMix Awards	Music Video of the Year	"Candy"	Nominated	
2025	CelebMix Awards	Song of the Year	"Lovesick"	Nominated	
2026	Rolling Stone UK	Future of Music	XO	Included	
