= Baby D (group) =

English music group

- Origin: United Kingdom
- Genres: Breakbeat hardcore, house, dance
- Years active: 1989-present
- Label: Production House Records
- Members: Dorothy "Dee" Fearon; Claudio Galdez; Terry "MC Juice" Jones
- Past members: Floyd Dyce

Baby D are a British breakbeat hardcore and house music group, best known for their hit single "Let Me Be Your Fantasy" which reached number 1 on the UK chart in 1994.

== Career ==
The group was formed by Production House Records, a record label set up in 1987 by former recording artist Phil Fearon, whose group Galaxy had had a number of hits in the 1980s. Involved with the rave scene, Production House's in-house record producer, Floyd Dyce, wrote and performed under several different names, including the House Crew, DMS and Xstatic.

Baby D were originally another outlet for his compositions, consisting of his wife, lead vocalist Dee Galdes-Fearon (a former member of Galaxy), Claudio Galdez on keyboards and windsynth and Terry Jones (rap name: MC Juice / stage name: MC Nino) on vocals and keyboards. Their debut track "Casanova" with Jazz & The Brothers Grimm was released in 1989.

"Let Me Be Your Fantasy" reached number 1 on the UK Singles Chart in November 1994. The success continued with "(Everybody's Got to Learn Sometime) I Need Your Loving" (a 1995 cover of the Korgis classic), "So Pure" and "Take Me to Heaven", all included in the album Deliverance (1996). At the first MOBO Awards show in 1996 Baby D won in the category "Best Dance Act".

In 2000, a UK garage remix of "Let Me Be Your Fantasy" (courtesy of the Trick or Treat production team) made the UK top 20. In 2004, the track was also covered by Ashley Jade but, although it made number 19 on the US Hot Dance Singles Sales chart, it did not make the main listing.

In the summer of 2008, the band performed at the UK dance music festival Global Gathering. They continue to perform on the club and festival circuit. Dyce now runs his own record label, Redmaster, and still writes and produces, while Fearon still performs in the UK and Continental Europe. Jones also co-wrote "I Feel You" for Peter Andre, which peaked at number 1 on the UK charts, and remixed and produced for Eternal and the Backstreet Boys, as well as St. Etienne vocalist Sarah Cracknell.

== Members ==
- Dorothy "Dee" Fearon – vocals (1989–present)
- Claudio Galdez – keyboards, drum programming, windsynth (1989–present)
- Terry "Nino" Jones – vocals, keyboards, live drums (1989–present)

=== Former members ===
- Floyd Dyce – keyboards, live drums (1989–1993)

== Discography ==
=== Studio albums ===
Title	Album details	Peak chart positions	
Title	Album details	UK	SWI
Deliverance	Released: 8 February 1996; Label: Systematic	5	47

=== Singles ===
Year	Single	Chart Position									Album
Year	Single	UK Singles	UK Dance	UK Club	AUS	BEL	GER	IRE	NDL	SWI	Album
1990	"Behind the Groove"	–	–	–	–	–	–	–	–	–	Non-Album Single
1990	"Day Dreaming"	–	27	–	–	–	–	–	–	–	Deliverance
1992	"Let Me Be Your Fantasy"	76	1	–	–	–	–	–	–	–	Deliverance
1993	"Destiny"	69	–	–	–	–	–	–	–	–	Deliverance
1994	"Casanova"	67	–	–	–	–	–	–	–	–	Deliverance
1994	"Let Me Be Your Fantasy" (re-release)	1	1	3	54	27	31	6	14	12	Deliverance
1995	"(Everybody's Got to Learn Sometime) I Need Your Loving"	3	5	18	124	–	55	13	–	–	Deliverance
1996	"So Pure"	3	9	2	242	–	–	18	–	–	Deliverance
1996	"Take Me to Heaven"	15	–	–	–	–	–	–	–	–	Deliverance
2000	"Let Me Be Your Fantasy (Trick or Treat Remix)"	16	3	–	–	–	90	–	–	96	Non-album single
"-" denotes releases that did not chart or were not released.
