= Willow Kayne =

English musician

- Born: Willow Katherine Kayne; Bristol, England
- Occupations: Singer; songwriter
- Years active: 2020–present
- Member of: Loud LDN
- Website: www.willowkayne.com

Willow Katherine Kayne is a British singer and songwriter. She won an Ivor Novello Rising Star Award in 2021. She is a member of Loud LDN.

== Early life ==
Willow Katherine Kayne was born to Toploader's Dancing in the Moonlight. Her sister makes classical music, and her mother, Emma, was a teaching assistant at St Patrick's Catholic Primary School in Corsham, who had previously produced music videos by The Prodigy, Nick Cave, and Erasure. In 2011, the Wiltshire Times noted that a "ten-year-old" Willow and a classmate had addressed Wiltshire Council, following threats to withdraw the subsidised bus she was travelling to St. Patrick's from; the same article noted that she travelled there "from Melksham". She also attended Wiltshire College & University Centre.

When she was fifteen, she temporarily lost the sight in her left eye, and permanently in her right; she had contracted acanthamoeba, which ate three out of four layers of her cornea. At the time, she was interested in a career in graphics, but changed course after listening to her favourite songs while blind and hearing things she had not heard before. She started making music in 2018, after receiving a new computer bundled with GarageBand; she would later make music with a torrented version of Logic Pro. Early tracks were released on SoundCloud.

== Career ==
=== 2019–2022: Playground Antics ===
In 2019, she and Kenya Grace made the Top 21 in ISawItFirst, a nationwide search in collaboration with Capital Xtra intended to find new women musicians, winning a music video for "Ctrl Alt Dlt". On 28 April 2021, she released her début single, "Two Seater"; the song had been written a year earlier. After being used in a TikTok advert, the song received over 1,000 abusive comments, which Kayne responded to by writing her second single, "I Don't Wanna Know", which she released on 22 July 2021. In September, she won an Ivor Novello Rising Star Award in 2021, along with mentorship from Nile Rodgers, and later that month "Two Seater" turned up on the FIFA 22 soundtrack. On 2 November 2021, she released a third single, "Opinion", which had been written the year before, and about abusive comments she had received. On 1 February 2022, she released the EP Playground Antics, which featured "Two Seater", "I Don't Wanna Know", and "Opinion".

=== 2022–present: Mr Universe, Loud LDN and "Cola Head" ===
On 5 May 2022, Kayne released the single "Final Notice", a commentary on her experience as a woman in the music industry, which was released alongside a Human Traffic-inspired music video. On 1 July that year, she released another single, "White City", an ode to inequality in White City, London, which featured "Final Notice". On 22 August, she released "Rat Race", which was also about her experiences of living in London, and which featured "White City" and "Final Notice". On 23 September that year, she released the four-track Mr Universe EP, the title track for which featured General Levy and was produced by Toddla T, and which featured "Rat Race", "White City", and "Final Notice".

In November 2022, Venbee used a November 2022 NME article to point out that she, Piri, Kayne, Charlotte Plank, A Little Sound, and Charlotte Haining were members of Loud LDN. On 19 May 2023, she released "Cola Head", a song about infidelity, as an independent artist, and then the following April she released "Robot Lovers", about the effects of technology on love. In 2025, Kayne co-wrote "Lovesick" and "Candy" for girl group XO; both songs featured on their debut EP, Fashionably Late. She also co-wrote "Clique" for the group, which featured on their second project, Need to Know.

In 2026, Kayne's song I've Got This All Under Control (stylized in all caps) was featured in an Apple Mac advertisement titled "Mac Students: The journey to great ideas in college". The advertisement is available to view on Apple's official YouTube channel.

== Artistry ==
Kayne's primary influences are Pharrell Williams, British rave culture, and Bristol, although when "Mr Universe" came out, she cited M-Beat and E-Z Rollers as inspirations, and when "Cola Head" came out, she cited the Neptunes.
