= Production House Records =

Production House Records was formed in 1987 by Phil Fearon, Laurie Jago and Raj Malkani. Fearon enjoyed a string of hits in the 1980s as producer and frontman of British soul/dance/pop collective, Galaxy.

Production House Records is best known as a leading label during the 1990s rave era, specialising in breakbeat hardcore and subsequently jungle and drum and bass.

The artist roster of this prolific label included some of the foremost acts of the genre such as: Baby D, Acen, The House Crew, Terry Jones (rap name: MC Juice / stage name: MC Nino), The Brothers Grimm, DMS and DJ Solo.

In 1994, Production House achieved a number one hit with "Let Me Be Your Fantasy" by Baby D. Not having hit the top 75 upon original release two years earlier, the track achieved success after it was licensed to Systematic Records, one of the few genuine rave crossover hits of the early 1990s era.

== See also ==
- Lists of record labels
