= Let Me Be Your Fantasy =

1992 single by Baby D

Single by Baby D

from the album Deliverance
- Released: 26 October 1992
- Genre: Rave; breakbeat hardcore; happy hardcore
- Length: 7:49 (album version); 3:52 (radio edit)
- Label: Production House (October 26, 1992); Systematic (1994)
- Songwriter: Floyd Dyce
- Producer: Floyd Dyce

Baby D singles chronology
"Day Dreaming" (1990)	"Let Me Be Your Fantasy" (1992)	"Destiny" (1993)
"Casanova" (1994)	"Let Me Be Your Fantasy" (1994)	"(Everybody's Got to Learn Sometime) I Need Your Loving" (1995)

Music video
- "Let Me Be Your Fantasy" on YouTube

"Let Me Be Your Fantasy" is a song by British musical group Baby D. It was written and produced by band member Floyd Dyce and the vocals were sung by Dorothy Fearon (also known as Dorothy "Dee" Galdes and Dee Galdes-Fearon). It was originally released by Production House Records on October 26, 1992, when it reached No. 76 on the UK Singles Chart. In November 1994, London Records subsidiary Systematic re-released the song, and it subsequently became a UK No. 1 hit for two weeks. A partially black-and-white music video was produced to promote the single, featuring Fearon performing in the middle of three lit candles on each side.

In 1996, it was included on the group's only album, Deliverance. Same year, it earned an award for Best Dance Tune at the International Dance Music Awards in London. And Mixmag ranked it No. 42 in their ranking of the "100 Greatest Dance Singles of All Time". The rave track is now widely regarded as a classic of its genre. Dyce has said "My idea for Fantasy was to try to develop an original song on top of hard beats: something you could sing along to as you were raving."

== Background ==
"I was watching The X Factor once and some girl came on and sang 'Fantasy'. I was like, 'Woah, OK! That's a strange one!' It's become a modern standard in some ways, and I do feel honoured to be a part of something like that."

— Floyd Dyce talking to The Guardian about the song.

Floyd Dyce of Baby D had been in a jazz, funk and soul band in the early 80's that had been working with Jamaican–English record producer Phil Fearon. When Fearon later developed his own production company, Production House Records, Dyce joined and started working as in-house producer for several acts. It was here he met Fearon's wife and vocalist on "Let Me Be Your Fantasy", Dorothy Fearon. Dyce wrote the song as a response to the clubs he was frequenting at the time, where much of the music they played was sample-heavy. He told in a 2024 interview, "I had this idea for a sample in my head, but it came out completely differently. I got Dee to sing what I thought would be this burst of a sample, but then I wrote the song around it. Back then in the hardcore scene, there weren't too many tracks with full-on vocals: it meant the label was unsure [about it]! But when it was played, people went mental."

== Critical reception ==
Larry Flick from Billboard magazine wrote, "Now here is a melting pot of street vibes. Hip hop-induced break beats percolate beneath aggressive, rave-ish keyboards while Baby D purrs and pouts like a peppy pop ingenue. The end result is a gem of a single with a left-of-center quality that endears after repeated listens. Could become a sleeper smash with the right amount of promotional TLC." Tom Ewing of Freaky Trigger called the song "uplifting, always ready to drop in a big hook, keeping the rushy spirit of UK house alive." He stated that "its breakbeat undercarriage gives 'Let Me Be' a rough, robust chunkiness which plays well off Baby D's powerful vocals."

In his weekly UK chart commentary, James Masterton said that "Let Me Be Your Fantasy" "is the closest thing the underground dance scene has to a long lost classic." Simon Price from Melody Maker named it one of the "two most precious moments of the Pop Year '95" alongside "Dreamer" by Livin' Joy, as they both reached the number one position on the UK Singles Chart that year. He also praised it as a "sublime Italo-drum'n'bass classic". Maria Jimenez from Music & Media declared it as a "techno houser", adding, "Don't miss the beat". Alan Jones from Music Week gave the song a score of four out of five, adding, "Somewhere between house, garage and techno, it's sure to score." Jake Barnes from Muzik deemed it as "jungle-lite". James Hamilton from the Record Mirror Dance Update described it as a "plaintive girl wailed galloper", with its "episodic spurting stop/start 0-134.8-0bpm" in his weekly dance column. Richard Wilson reviewed the song for Smash Hits, saying, "This is quite nice. I'd listen to it again. I like the orchestration and the way it changes. It's well put together. Yes, I really like that one too."

== Chart performance ==
In Europe, "Let Me Be Your Fantasy" reached No. 76 on the UK Singles Chart when first released in 1992. It remained popular, and the single was reissued in the UK in 1994. It entered the UK Singles Chart at No. 3 before climbing to No. 1 the following week, on 20 November 1994, where it remained for two weeks. It was the 18th best-selling single of 1994 in the UK. On the Eurochart Hot 100, "Let Me Be Your Fantasy" peaked at No. 5 in December 1994. It was also a top-10 hit in Greece, where it reached number two, and a top-20 hit in Finland, the Netherlands, Sweden and Switzerland. In West Asia, it became a top-10 hit in Israel, peaking at number eight on 27 December 1994. The song also charted in Oceania, reaching number 54 on the ARIA singles chart in Australia. It was released for a third time in 2000 as a UK garage remix by Trick or Treat. This version, featuring MC Tails, peaked at No. 16.

== Music video ==
The accompanying music video for "Let Me Be Your Fantasy" is mostly made in black-and-white, but some scenes are also shown in colour. In many scenes, singer Dorothy Fearon is seen in the middle of three lit candles on each side. Other scenes show the two male members of Baby D or several dancers performing choreography. Sometimes the men are also seen in the middle of the six lit candles. A woman with a long head scarf and a couple, both with bald heads, also appear in the video. Some scenes are made to look like billowing water, with Fearon wearing black sunglasses in the background. "Let Me Be Your Fantasy" was a Box Top on British music television channel The Box in December 1994. One month later, it was B-listed on Germany's VIVA and received active rotation on MTV Europe the following month, in February 1995.

== Impact and legacy ==
"Let Me Be Your Fantasy" was voted No. 1 record of all time on Kiss FM, London. It earned an award for Best Dance Tune at the 1996 International Dance Music Awards, and same year, British electronic music and clubbing magazine Mixmag ranked the song No. 42 in its "100 Greatest Dance Singles of All Time" list, adding,

"It took almost three years for 'Let Me Be Your Fantasy' to worm its way into the British public's affections, to shift from hardcore anthem to chart topping smash. In retrospect, the only thing that's surprising is that it took so long. 'Let Me Be Your Fantasy' – a sneaky paen to ecstasy's 'warm embrace' disguised as a love song – was perhaps the most commercial tune that the hardcore scene ever produced. Massive pianos, crunching breaks and a ravealong chorus meant its appeal spread wider than white gloved Vicks sniffers. Far enough, in fact, to get it voted the Kiss listeners' favourite tune of all time in a recent poll."

In 2011, MTV Dance placed the song at No. 13 in their list of "The 100 Biggest 90's Dance Anthems of All Time". In 2015, Sam Richards from The Guardian wrote that "'Let Me Be Your Fantasy' was the biggest crossover hit of the rave era." In 2018, Mixmag listed "Let Me Be Your Fantasy" as one of "The 30 Best Vocal House Anthems Ever", and The Vinyl Factory included the song in their list of "10 Essential Piano-driven UK Rave Records From 1990-1994". In 2020, The Guardian ranked the song No. 76 in their list of "The 100 Greatest UK No 1s", writing:

"The lyrics are essentially a QVC infomercial for the eroto-psychedelic effects of ecstasy – 'Lotions of love flow through your hands / See visions, colours every day' – and the music is shamelessly designed to intensify drug experiences. The junglist breakbeats keep the energy high, while the big piano chords and yearning vocals are like a head massage from some bloke you just met but nevertheless now feel a deeper kinship with than your immediate family."

In 2022, Classic Pop ranked "Let Me Be Your Fantasy" number seven in their list of the top 40 dance tracks from the 90's, noting "a mammoth piano hook that's hard to escape from".

== Track listing ==
- UK CD single – 1994 issue on Systematic Records [SYSCD4]
1. Radio Edit
2. Original Mix
3. Dancing Divaz Club Mix
4. Ruffer Remix
5. Cool Breeze Slow + Low Remix
6. DJ Professor's X Club Mix
7. Ray Keith Remix

== Charts ==
=== Original version ===
==== Weekly charts ====
Chart (1992)	Peak position
UK Singles (OCC)	76
UK Dance (Music Week)	1
UK Club Chart (Music Week)	93

Chart (1994–1995)	Peak position
Australia (ARIA)	54
Belgium (Ultratop 50 Flanders)	27
Europe (Eurochart Hot 100)	5
Europe (European Dance Radio)	1
Europe (European Hit Radio)	39
Finland (Suomen virallinen lista)	11
Germany (GfK)	31
Greece (Pop + Rock)	2
Ireland (IRMA)	6
Israel (Israeli Singles Chart)	8
Netherlands (Dutch Top 40)	13
Netherlands (Single Top 100)	14
Scottish Singles Sales (Official Charts)	5
Sweden (Sverigetopplistan)	18
Switzerland (Schweizer Hitparade)	12
UK Singles (Official Charts)	1
UK Dance (Official Charts)	1
UK Hip Hop/R&B (Official Charts)	1
UK Airplay (Music Week)	22
UK Club Chart (Music Week)	3

==== Year-end charts ====
Chart (1994)	Position
UK Singles (OCC)	18

Chart (1995)	Position
Netherlands (Dutch Top 40)	108

=== Trick or Treat remix ===
Chart (2000)	Peak position
Germany (GfK)	90
Scottish Singles Sales (Official Charts)	31
Switzerland (Schweizer Hitparade)	96
UK Singles (Official Charts)	16
UK Dance (Official Charts)	3

== Certifications ==
Region	Certification	Certified units/sales
United Kingdom (BPI)	Platinum	600,000^{‡}
^{‡} Sales+streaming figures based on certification alone.

== Release history ==
Region	Date	Format(s)	Label(s)	Ref.
United Kingdom	26 October 1992	12-inch vinyl; CD	Production House	
United Kingdom	30 November 1992	12-inch remix vinyl	Production House	
United Kingdom (re-release)	7 November 1994	12-inch vinyl; CD; cassette	Systematic	
Australia	16 January 1995	CD; cassette	Production House; Systematic; Polydor	
Japan	25 February 1995	CD	Production House; Systematic	

== Cover versions ==
- In 2007, the song was covered by German trance project 4 Clubbers.
- In 2010, Pictureplane sampled the whole song in his version titled "Beyond Fantasy".
- In 2020, the song was covered by Gok Wan and Craig Knight and featured vocals by Kele Le Roc.
- In 2022, the song was covered by MODE12 and featured vocals by Daniel Pearce (as DTale).
