= Wonderland (magazine) =

British bi-monthly lifestyle and culture magazine

- Editor: Huw Gwyther
- Frequency: Bi-monthly
- Publisher: Self-published
- First issue: 8 September 2005
- Based in: Notting Hill, London, England
- Website: wonderlandmagazine.com
- ISSN: 1747-8448
- OCLC: 225926616

Wonderland is a British bi-monthly magazine based in Notting Hill, London, dedicated to lifestyle, fashion and popular culture. It was launched in September 2005 by editor Huw Gwyther under Visual Talent Ltd., after proposing the business idea as a pitch on Series 1 of the British television programme Dragons' Den in late 2004, subsequently receiving a £175,000 investment from British entrepreneur Peter Jones.
