= Fame (magazine) =

US magazine

- Cover of premier issue, featuring Clint Eastwood
- Editor: Gael Love
- Frequency: Monthly
- Publisher: Steven Greenberg
- Founded: 1988
- First issue: November 1988
- Final issue: Winter 1991
- Company: Fame Magazine Group
- Country: United States
- Based in: New York, New York
- Language: English
- ISSN: 0898-6940

Fame was an American magazine founded in New York City in 1988. It focused on celebrity profiles, interviews, photos, and general-interest stories.

== Overview ==
The magazine was owned by its publisher, Steven Greenberg, and edited by Gael Love, who had previously worked on Andy Warhol's Interview magazine.

In 1989, Fame published an unauthorized index to The Andy Warhol Diaries, but was beaten to publication by Spy (magazine), which released its own index a month earlier.

Fame was published for two years, and released its final Winter 1991 issue at the end of 1990.

== See also ==
- Life & Style (magazine)
- List of defunct American periodicals
