= Glory Days (Little Mix album) =

- Standard edition cover

Studio album by Little Mix
- Released: 18 November 2016
- Studios: The Hide Out Studios, London; Tileyard Studios, London
- Genres: Dance-pop; pop; R&B
- Length: 42:51
- Languages: English; Spanish
- Labels: Syco; Columbia
- Producers: Adam Midgley; Charlie Puth; Cutfather; Dan Bartlett; Daniel Davidsen; Electric; Freedo; JMIKE; Johan Carlsson; Kuya; Matt Rad; MNEK; Nick Atkinson; Peter Wallevik; Robopop; Steve James; Steve Robson; Tommy Baxter

Little Mix chronology
Get Weird (2015)	Glory Days (2016)	LM5 (2018)

Singles from Glory Days
- 1. "Shout Out to My Ex" Released: 16 October 2016; 2. "Touch" Released: 9 December 2016; 3. "No More Sad Songs" Released: 3 March 2017; 4. "Power" Released: 26 May 2017

Glory Days is the fourth studio album by British girl group Little Mix, released on 18 November 2016 by Syco Music and Columbia Records. When released it was met with acclaim from critics, with lyrics that addresses themes on sexuality, sexual relationships, female solitude, and other topics. Little Mix worked with various producers including MNEK, Freedo, Matt Rad, all of whom had worked with them on previous releases.

The album's lead single "Shout Out to My Ex", peaked at number-one on the UK Singles Chart, becoming the group's fourth number-one. Its second single "Touch" reached number four, while its third single "No More Sad Songs", with Machine Gun Kelly, reached number fifteen. Its final single "Power", with Stormzy, peaked at number six, while a fifth single "Reggaetón Lento" with CNCO, was released after the reissued edition of the album. The album's lead single won British Single of the Year at the Brit Awards in 2017. In 2018, Glory Days received two Brit Awards nominations for British Song of the Year and British Video of the Year.

Glory Days showcased the best first-week sales so far in Little Mix's career, selling 100,000 copies in its first week. It had the highest first-week UK album sales for a girl group since the Spice Girls' Spiceworld (1997) and became the fastest-selling number-one album from a girl group since Destiny's Child's Survivor (2001). It set a new chart record for the most weeks spent inside the top 40 of the UK Albums Chart for a girl group album, spending 89 weeks on the charts. It also became first album by a girl group to reach 2 billion streams on Spotify and has since reached over 2.5 billion streams on the platform. It is included on the list of best-selling albums of the 2010s in the United Kingdom.

In Ireland it became Little Mix's second consecutive number-one album, and peaked at number-one on the Scottish Albums Chart and UK Albums Chart. It spent five consecutive weeks at number one, becoming the longest reigning number one album by a girl group since Spice (1996). It entered the top ten in Australia, New Zealand, Netherlands, and Spain, and charted in other regions including Italy, Germany, and the United States, where it peaked at number twenty-five on the Billboard 200. As of 2017, Glory Days, has sold 1.6 million copies worldwide.

== Singles ==
"Shout Out to My Ex" was released as the lead single on 16 October 2016, and was premiered on the day of The X Factor UK results show. It was made available to download along with the pre-order of the album. The song debuted at number one on the UK Singles Chart, remaining at number one for three weeks. The single received two Brit awards nominations, and won gave the group their first Brit Award win, winning British Single of the Year at the 2017 Brit Awards. It also became the second-best selling girl group single released in the United Kingdom, behind "Wannabe", by the Spice Girls. It topped the charts in Ireland, Scotland, Israel, and peaked inside the top ten in both Australia and New Zealand.

On 5 December, the group announced "Touch" as the second single. It reached number 4 on the UK Singles Chart, and peaked within the top ten of the charts in Ireland and Scotland. It has since been regarded as a gay anthem. On 1 March, "No More Sad Songs" was released as the third single from the album. The new remix of the song featured American hip-hop artist Machine Gun Kelly. Despite minimal promotion, the song charted at number 15 on the UK Singles Chart.

On 19 May, Little Mix announced through their official Twitter that "Power" would be released as the album's fourth and final official single on 26 May. Two hours after the announcement of the single's release, they announced that the single release of "Power" would be remixed, with an added feature from English grime act Stormzy. The song reached number six on the UK Singles Chart. It has become a female empowerment song and was used as one of the theme songs for WWE's Royal Rumble 2018 event.

On 24 November 2017, the album was reissued as Glory Days: The Platinum Edition. It included the single "Reggaetón Lento (Remix)", with CNCO. The single topped the Romanian and Bulgaria World music charts, and reached number five on the UK Singles Chart, becoming CNCO's first top-ten single and Little Mix's twelfth. According to Official Charts in 2019, "Shout Out to My Ex" (at number two) and "Touch" (at number seven) were two of the biggest girl group singles from the past 25 years.

=== Promotional singles ===
The album was supported by six promotional singles. On 27 October 2016, "You Gotta Not" was released as the first promotional single. The song debuted at number 61 in the UK, number 96 in Australia and number 88 in Ireland. On 4 November, "F.U." was released as the second promotional single, peaking at number 82 in the UK. "Nothing Else Matters" was released as the third promotional single on 11 November.

"Touch" was released on 15 November as the fourth promotional single before being announced as the second single of the album. "Nobody Like You" was released as the fifth promotional single on 16 November, peaking at number 185 in the UK. The sixth and final promotional single, "Down & Dirty", was released on 17 November, and peaked at number 159 in the UK.

"Oops", featuring American singer Charlie Puth, was not released as a single but the song peaked at number 41 in the UK and number 49 in Ireland. It has been certified gold by the British Phonographic Industry (BPI) for selling over 400,000 copies in the country. In 2021, it was ranked as the group's biggest-selling non-single in the UK, amassing over 40 million streams.

"Is Your Love Enough" peaked at number 47 in the UK and number 49 in Ireland. It ranks as the group's sixth biggest-selling non-single in the UK.

== Promotion ==
To promote the album, the group scheduled a promotional campaign called the Glory Days Road Trip, which visited the UK, Australia, the US, France, Netherlands, Chile, Brazil, Argentina, Belgium, Germany, Norway, Finland and Singapore. Little Mix also made televised and award show appearances between 2016 and 2018 to promote the album across Europe, America, Asia, and Australia.

Little Mix embarked on The Glory Days Tour in support of the album. It kicked off on 21 May 2017 in Birkenhead, England, and ended on 25 March 2018 in Kobe, Japan, where Little Mix headlined the POPSPRING festival. An estimated 810,000 tickets were sold worldwide and consisted of 70 shows across Oceania, Europe, and Asia. The tour grossed $43,000,000, becoming the highest-grossing girl group tour of the 2010s.

== Critical reception ==
Professional ratings
Review scores
Source	Rating
AllMusic	4/5 stars
Digital Spy	4/5 stars
Evening Standard	3/5 stars
The Guardian	4/5 stars
The Line of Best Fit	7/10
NewsComAu	3/5 stars
Time Out	3/5 stars
The Times	3/5 stars

The Guardian called the album "chart pop perfection" and went on to describe the message of the album as "substantial as Girl Power once was". AllMusic stated that Glory Days "finds the group delivering a set of hooky, smartly crafted songs that balance swaggering, '60s-style R&B with stylish, electronic-tinged dance-pop". They also added that "Little Mix's vocal grit and sassy group chemistry make Glory Days such a celebratory album".

In another positive review, Digital Spy wrote, "Little Mix have put together their most personal album yet, without sacrificing big hooks, a mainstream pop sensibility and plenty of sassy attitude." The article continued by saying "Glory Days hears four young women come together with a very real bond, making their message all the more believable." At the end of 2016 the website considered Glory Days to be the 12th best album of the year.

The Evening Standard praised Little Mix for surviving with their fourth studio album, writing "Glory Days mostly sticks to their winning formula", and adding that "the foursome have carved out a pop niche for themselves". The album was included by the newspaper as one of the best albums to buy as a Christmas present "for teen queens". Time Out said that the album "has already earned its super-confident title", with the chart-topping single "Shout Out to My Ex" and added that "Little Mix sing brilliantly and sound like they’re having a ball. Long may their glory days continue".

=== Year-end lists ===
Glory Days on year-end lists
Publication	List	Rank	Ref.
Digital Spy	20 Best Albums of 2016	12	
Celeb Mix	Best Pop Albums of 2016	3	

== Commercial performance ==
Glory Days became Little Mix's first album to top the charts in the United Kingdom, also making them the eighth girl group in history to achieve a number-one and the twenty-fourth number one album to emerge from The X Factor UK. It became one of seven of the 37 albums released that year to top the charts led by female artists. In its opening week it sold over a 96,000 copies, becoming the fastest-selling album since David Bowie's Blackstar and the second fastest-selling female album of 2016. It had the highest first-week UK album sales for a girl group since Spiceworld in 1997, and became the fastest-selling number-one album by a girl group in 15 years, since Survivor by Destiny's Child in 2001. In its second week it sold 60,000 copies and was certified gold by the British Phonographic Industry (BPI).

Glory Days spent a total of five consecutive weeks at number one in the UK, becoming the longest charting girl group number-one album this millennium since the Spice Girls spent 15 weeks at number one with Spice in 1996. It also set a new chart record for the most weeks spent in the top 40 of the UK Albums chart by a girl group album. All four of the album's singles have been certified platinum or higher by the British Phonographic Industry, making Little Mix the only girl group apart from the Spice Girls to have all singles from one album achieve at least platinum status in the United Kingdom. In 2018, it became the group's first album to surpass a million sales.

The album was ranked as the seventh best-selling album of 2016, the fourth best-selling album of 2017, and the 30th best-selling album of 2018 in the UK by The Official Charts. In 2017 it was also ranked as the sixth biggest album of that year in pure sales and the fifth most streamed album overall. It was the 39th best-selling album of the 2010s, the best-selling album by a girl group during that decade, and the seventh best-selling album by a girl group between 1994 and 2019. It remains as their best-selling album to date in the United Kingdom. In 2019, it also ranked as the sixteenth biggest album by female artists that decade. As of 2022, it has the longest run of any of their albums inside the Official Albums Chart Top 40, spending a total of 89 weeks there. It has since been streamed over 419,000 streams, becoming the group most-streamed album in the country.

The album debut at number one in Ireland, becoming the group's second number one album in the country, while reaching the top spot in Scotland. It peaked in-side the top ten in Australia, Spain, Netherlands, and New Zealand. In the United States, Glory Days, peaked at number 25 on the Billboard 200 and reached the charts in nineteen additional music markets including Japan, Germany, and Canada. As of 2017, Glory Days had sold 1.6 million copies worldwide. and was their first album to be certified triple platinum in the UK. It has since been certified double platinum in Ireland, certified platinum in Brazil and Denmark, and certified gold in Canada, Australia, Mexico, Norway, and Switzerland. In 2018, the album became Little Mix's first album to reach over a billion streams on Spotify, and became the most streamed girl group album on the platform in 2020.

== Accolades ==
At the 2017 Brit Awards, the group received three award nominations for the album's singles, and won British Single of the Year for the album's lead single, "Shout Out to My Ex".

List of awards and nominations of the album and its singles, with year and award ceremony shown
Year	Award ceremony	Category	Nominee(s)/work(s)	Result	Ref.
2017	Brit Awards	British Single of the Year	"Shout Out to My Ex"	Won	
2017	Radio Music Awards	Best Break-Up Song	"Shout Out to My Ex"	Won	
2017	Teen Choice Awards	Choice Song: Group	"Shout Out to My Ex"	Nominated	
2017	Myx Music Awards	Favourite International Video	"Shout Out to My Ex"	Nominated	
2017	Beano Awards	Pop Song of the Year	"Power" (featuring Stormzy)	Won	
2017	Popjustice's Twenty Quid Music Prize	Track of the Year	"Touch"	Won	
2018	Myx Music Awards	Favourite International Video	"Touch"	Nominated	
2018	Brit Awards	British Single of the Year	"Touch"	Nominated	
2018	Brit Awards	British Video of the Year	"Touch"	Nominated	
2018	Global Awards	Best Song	"Power" (featuring Stormzy)	Won	

== Impact ==
Since its release, Glory Days broke various records and is regarded as one of the most successful girl group albums of the 2010s. Upon release it achieved the highest first week sales for a number one album by a British girl group in nineteen years, became the fastest selling number one album by a girl group in fifteen years, and simultaneously made them the eighth UK girl group and thirteen overall to achieve a chart topping album on the UK Albums Charts.

It was dubbed by the Official Charts Company as the longest reigning number-one album this millennium by an all female act after spending five consecutive weeks at number-one. It also set two new chart records as the longest charting album by a girl band on the UK Albums Charts with 173 weeks with the most weeks spent inside of the top 40 of the UK Albums Charts.

For four consecutive years, Glory Days was ranked as one of the best selling albums in the United Kingdom between 2016 and 2019. As of 2019 it was named as the seventh biggest girl group album, and appears on the list of best-selling albums of the 2010s in the United Kingdom.

== Track listing ==
Glory Days – Standard version
No.	Title	Writer(s)	Producer(s)	Length
1.	"Shout Out to My Ex"	Edvard Førre Erfjord; Henrik Michelsen; Camille Purcell; Iain James; Ed Drewett; Perrie Edwards; Jesy Nelson; Leigh-Anne Pinnock; Jade Thirlwall	Electric; Maegan Cottone^{[a]}	4:06
2.	"Touch"	Hanni Ibrahim; Patrick Patrikios; A.S. Govere; Phil Plested	MNEK; Cottone^{[a]}	3:33
3.	"F.U."	Samuel Gerongco; Robert Gerongco; Maegan Cottone; Jean-Baptiste; Michael McHenry; Alessia Rita Iorio	Kuya; Cottone^{[a]}	3:58
4.	"Oops" (featuring Charlie Puth)	Puth; Michael Caren; Jacob Luttrell	Puth; Cottone^{[a]}	3:24
5.	"You Gotta Not"	Johan Carlsson; Alexander Kronlund; Ross Golan; Meghan Trainor	Carlsson; Noah Passovoy^{[a]}	3:11
6.	"Down & Dirty"	Edwards; Nelson; Pinnock; Thirlwall; Cottone; Fridolin Walcher; Sam Romans	Freedo; Cottone^{[a]}	2:55
7.	"Power"	Dan Omelio; Purcell; James Abrahart	Robopop; Matt Rad; Steve James; Cottone^{[a]}	4:07
8.	"Your Love"	Purcell; Jeremy Coleman; Abrahart	JMIKE; Cottone^{[a]}	3:27
9.	"Nobody Like You"	Steve Robson; Emily Warren	Robson; Tommy Baxter^{[b]}; Adam Midgley^{[b]}; Joe Kearns^{[a]}	4:08
10.	"No More Sad Songs"	Warren; Erfjord; Michelsen; Tash Phillips	Electric; Kearns^{[a]}	3:26
11.	"Private Show"	Edwards; Nelson; Pinnock; Thirlwall; Walcher; Romans; Cottone	Freedo; Kearns^{[a]}	2:41
12.	"Nothing Else Matters"	Peter Wallevik; Daniel Davidsen; Mich Hansen; Purcell; Wayne Hector	Wallevik; Davidsen; Cutfather; Freedo^{[b]}; Kearns^{[a]}	3:55
Total length:				42:51

Glory Days – Deluxe edition
No.	Title	Writer(s)	Producer(s)	Length
13.	"Beep Beep"	Purcell; Erfjord; Michelsen; Iain James	Electric; Kearns^{[a]}	3:52
14.	"Freak"	Dan Bartlett; Nelson; Jake Roche; Nick Atkinson	Bartlett; Atkinson; Cottone^{[a]}	3:36
15.	"Touch" (acoustic)	Ibrahim; Patrikios; Govere; Plested	Cottone^{[a]}	3:43
Total length:				54:02

Glory Days – Japanese edition
No.	Title	Length
16.	"Grown" (live)	4:01
17.	"Wings" (live)	5:22
18.	"Secret Love Song" (live)	4:30
19.	"Black Magic" (live)	4:10
Total length:		72:05

Glory Days – Deluxe edition DVD: The Get Weird Tour Live from The SSE Arena, Wembley
No.	Title	Length
1.	"Grown"	3:59
2.	"Hair"	5:47
3.	"Wings"	7:57
4.	"Lightning"	5:51
5.	"DNA"	6:13
6.	"Secret Love Song"	4:30
7.	"OMG"	5:36
8.	"Salute"	7:31
9.	"Little Me"	4:05
10.	"Move"	5:30
11.	"How Ya Doin'?"	4:12
12.	"Love Me Like You"	4:55
13.	"Weird People"	4:25
14.	"The Beginning"	3:25
15.	"Black Magic"	3:53
Total length:		77:49

Glory Days – The Platinum Edition
No.	Title	Writer(s)	Producer(s)	Length
1.	"Shout Out to My Ex"	Erfjord; Michelsen; Purcell; James; Edwards; Nelson; Pinnock; Thirlwall	Electric; Cottone^{[a]}	4:06
2.	"Touch" (featuring Kid Ink)	Ibrahim; Patrikios; Govere; Plested	MNEK; Cottone^{[a]}	3:22
3.	"Reggaetón Lento (Remix)" (with CNCO)	Luis Angel O'Neill; Eric Perez; Jadan Andino; Jorge Class; Jean Rodríguez; Richard Camacho; Purcell	Matt Rad; Jorge Class; Eric Perez; Luis Angel O'Neill; Clara Taroncher	3:08
4.	"F.U."	Gerongco; Gerongco; Cottone; Jean-Baptiste; McHenry; Iorio	Kuya; Cottone^{[a]}	3:58
5.	"Power" (featuring Stormzy)	Omelio; Purcell; Abrahart; Michael Omari	Robopop; Rad; James; Cottone^{[a]}	4:02
6.	"No More Sad Songs" (featuring Machine Gun Kelly)	Warren; Erfjord; Michelsen; Phillips; Colson Baker	Electric; Kearns^{[a]}	3:45
7.	"Oops" (featuring Charlie Puth)	Puth; Caren; Luttrell	Puth; Cottone^{[a]}	3:24
8.	"You Gotta Not"	Carlsson; Kronlund; Golan; Trainor	Carlsson; Passovoy^{[a]}	3:11
9.	"Down & Dirty"	Edwards; Nelson; Pinnock; Thirlwall; Cottone; Fridolin Walcher; Romans	Freedo; Cottone^{[a]}	2:55
10.	"Your Love"	Purcell; Coleman; Abrahart	JMIKE; Cottone^{[a]}	3:27
11.	"Nobody Like You"	Robson; Warren	Robson; Baxter^{[b]}; Midgley^{[b]}; Kearns^{[a]}	4:08
12.	"Private Show"	Edwards; Nelson; Pinnock; Thirlwall; Walcher; Romans; Cottone	Freedo; Kearns^{[a]}	2:41
13.	"Nothing Else Matters"	Wallevik; Davidsen; Hansen; Purcell; Hector	Wallevik; Davidsen; Cutfather; Freedo^{[b]}; Kearns^{[a]}	3:55
14.	"If I Get My Way"	Ben Kohn; Tom Barnes; Pete Kelleher; Sam Romans; Rachel Keen	TMS; Kearns^{[a]}	3:41
15.	"Is Your Love Enough?"	Michelsen; Erfjord; Romans; Fred Gibson; Eyelar Mirzazedeh	Electric; Max Anstruther; Kearns^{[a]}; FRED^{[a]}	3:45
16.	"Dear Lover"	Ali Tamposi; Matthew Burns; Chloe Angelides; Andrew Wotman	Burns; Kearns^{[a]}	3:21
Total length:				56:49

Glory Days — Japan Platinum Edition
No.	Title	Writer(s)	Length
17.	"Shout Out to My Ex" (acoustic)	Edvard Førre Erfjord; Henrik Michelsen; Camille Purcell; Iain James; Perrie Edwards; Jesy Nelson; Leigh-Anne Pinnock; Jade Thirlwall	4:06
18.	"No More Sad Songs" (acoustic)	Warren; Erfjord; Michelsen; Tash Phillips	3:13
Total length:			64:14

Glory Days – Platinum Edition digital version
No.	Title	Writer(s)	Producer(s)	Length
17.	"Touch"	Hanni Ibrahim; Patrick Patrikios; A.S. Govere; Phil Plested	MNEK; Cottone^{[a]}	3:33
18.	"Power"	Dan Omelio; Purcell; James Abrahart	Robopop; Matt Rad; Steve James; Cottone^{[a]}	4:07
19.	"No More Sad Songs"	Warren; Erfjord; Michelsen; Tash Phillips	Electric; Kearns^{[a]}	3:26
20.	"Beep Beep"	Purcell; Erfjord; Michelsen; Iain James	Electric; Kearns^{[a]}	3:52
21.	"Freak"	Dan Bartlett; Nelson; Jake Roche; Nick Atkinson	Bartlett; Atkinson; Cottone^{[a]}	3:36
22.	"Touch" (acoustic)	Ibrahim; Patrikios; Govere; Plested	Cottone^{[a]}	3:43
23.	"Shout Out to My Ex" (Steve Smart Epic Edit)	Edvard Førre Erfjord; Henrik Michelsen; Camille Purcell; Iain James; Perrie Edwards; Jesy Nelson; Leigh-Anne Pinnock; Jade Thirlwall	Steve Smart	3:41
24.	"Shout Out to My Ex" (acoustic)	Edvard Førre Erfjord; Henrik Michelsen; Camille Purcell; Iain James; Perrie Edwards; Jesy Nelson; Leigh-Anne Pinnock; Jade Thirlwall		4:06
25.	"No More Sad Songs" (acoustic)	Warren; Erfjord; Michelsen; Tash Phillips		3:13

Notes

- ^a signifies a vocal producer
- ^b signifies an additional producer
- On the digital expanded editions of the album, tracks 22–25 are not included.

== Personnel ==
Adapted from AllMusic.

- Nils Petter Ankarblom – horn, horn arrangements
- Simon Baggs – violin
- Paul Bailey – assistant engineer
- Tommy Baxter – additional production
- Cory Bice – assistant engineer
- Chris Bishop – engineer, vocal engineer
- Ian Burdge – cello
- Mattias Bylund – editing, horn, mixing
- Johan Carlsson – guitar programming, piano programming, producer, programming, synthesizer programming, vocal producer, vocals
- Jeremy Coleman – instrumentation, programming
- Nick Cooper – cello
- Maegan Cottone – arranger, engineer, vocal producer
- Tom Coyne – mastering
- Cutfather – producer
- Daniel Davidsen – bass programming, drum programming, guitar programming, instrumental, producer, programming
- Alison Dods – violin
- Electric – engineer, producer
- Uzoechi Emenike – drums, keyboards
- Edvard Førre Erfjord – instrumentation, programming
- Freedo – additional production, engineer, instrumentation, mixing, producer, programming
- Alice Frost – art direction
- Richard George – violin
- Robert Gerongco – drums, keyboards, piano
- Sam Gerongco – bass, guitar
- Serban Ghenea – mixing
- Susie Gillis – string contractor, strings contractor
- Ross Golan – vocals
- Wojtek Goral – alto saxophone
- Isobel Griffiths – string conductor, string contractor
- John Hanes – mixing engineer
- Mich Hansen – percussion
- Wayne Hector – background vocals
- Sam Holland – engineer
- Ash Howes – mixing
- Mark Hunter – photography
- Jeremy Isaac – violin
- J-Mike – producer
- Steve James – producer
- Magnus Johansson – trumpet
- Peter Noos Johansson – trombone
- Joe Kearns – engineer, vocal engineer, vocal producer
- Kuya – producer
- Jeremy Lertola – assistant engineer
- Little Mix – primary artist
- Manny Marroquin – mixing
- Roma Martyniuk – art direction
- Cliff Masterson – conductor, string arrangements
- Laura Melhuish – violin
- Randy Merrill – mastering
- Henrik Michelsen – instrumentation, programming
- Adam Midgley – additional production, bass, drum programming, keyboards, producer
- Sam Miller – engineer
- MNEK – engineer, producer
- Steve Morris – strings, violin
- Dano Omelio – engineer, instrumentation, producer, programming
- Noah Passovoy – vocal producer
- Tash Phillips – background vocals
- Tom Pigott-Smith – strings, violin
- Camille Purcell – vocals, background vocals
- Charlie Puth – engineer, featured artist, instrumentation, producer, programming
- Matt Rad – producer
- Alex Reid – vocal engineer
- Steve Robson – piano, producer
- Shane Shanahan – engineer
- Emlyn Singleton – strings, violin
- Phil Tan – mixing
- Meghan Trainor – background vocals
- Peter Wallevik – drum programming, instrumental, piano programming, programmer, programming
- Matthew Ward – violin
- Emily Warren – background vocals
- Paul Willey – violin
- Bill Zimmerman – assistant, mixing assistant

== Charts ==
=== Weekly charts ===
Chart (2016)	Peak position
Australian Albums (ARIA)	2
Austrian Albums (Ö3 Austria)	24
Belgian Albums (Ultratop Flanders)	11
Belgian Albums (Ultratop Wallonia)	67
Canadian Albums (Billboard)	21
Croatian Albums (HDU)	29
Czech Albums (ČNS IFPI)	34
Danish Albums (Hitlisten)	37
Dutch Albums (Album Top 100)	9
Finnish Albums (Suomen virallinen lista)	26
French Albums (SNEP)	50
German Albums (Offizielle Top 100)	27
Greek Albums (IFPI)	29
Hungarian Albums (MAHASZ)	13
Irish Albums (IRMA)	1
Italian Albums (FIMI)	13
Japanese Albums (Oricon)	41
Japanese International Albums (Oricon)	10
New Zealand Albums (RMNZ)	9
Norwegian Albums (VG-lista)	13
Dutch Albums (Album Top 100)	9
Polish Albums (ZPAV)	30
Portuguese Albums (AFP)	16
Scottish Albums (Official Charts)	1
Spanish Albums (Promusicae)	9
Swedish Albums (Sverigetopplistan)	23
Swiss Albums (Schweizer Hitparade)	22
South Korean International Albums (Circle)	19
Slovak Albums (ČNS IFPI)	25
Taiwanese Western Albums (Five Music)	1
UK Albums (Official Charts)	1
US Billboard 200	25

=== Year-end charts ===
Chart (2016)	Position
Australian Albums (ARIA)	59
Belgian Albums (Ultratop Flanders)	158
UK Albums (OCC)	7
Chart (2017)	Position
Australian Albums (ARIA)	43
Belgian Albums (Ultratop Flanders)	86
Dutch Albums (MegaCharts)	84
Norwegian Albums (VG-lista)	90
New Zealand Albums (RMNZ)	34
UK Albums (OCC)	4
Chart (2018)	Position
Belgian Albums (Ultratop Flanders)	140
Irish Albums (IRMA)	26
UK Albums (OCC)	30
Chart (2019)	Position
UK Albums (OCC)	87

=== Decade-end charts ===
Chart (2010–2019)	Position
UK Albums (OCC)	39

== Certifications ==
Certifications for Glory Days
Region	Certification	Certified units/sales
Australia (ARIA)	Gold	35,000^{^}
Brazil (Pro-Música Brasil)	Platinum	40,000^{‡}
Canada (Music Canada)	Gold	40,000^{‡}
Denmark (IFPI Danmark)	Platinum	20,000^{‡}
Mexico (AMPROFON)	Gold	30,000^{‡}
New Zealand (RMNZ)	Platinum	15,000^{‡}
Norway (IFPI Norway)	Gold	10,000^{‡}
Poland (ZPAV)	Platinum	20,000^{‡}
Switzerland (IFPI Switzerland)	Gold	10,000^{‡}
United Kingdom (BPI)	4× Platinum	1,200,000
United States	—	23,000
Summaries
Worldwide	—	1,600,000
^{^} Shipments figures based on certification alone.^{‡} Sales+streaming figures based on certification alone.

== Release history ==
Region	Date	Format	Edition	Label	Ref.
United States	18 November 2016	CD; digital download	Standard; deluxe	Columbia	
United Kingdom	18 November 2016	CD; digital download	Standard; deluxe	Syco	
United Kingdom	24 November 2017	CD; digital download	Platinum	Syco	

== See also ==
- Lists of UK Albums Chart number ones
- List of UK Albums Chart number ones of the 2010s
