= List of best-selling albums of the 2010s in the United Kingdom =

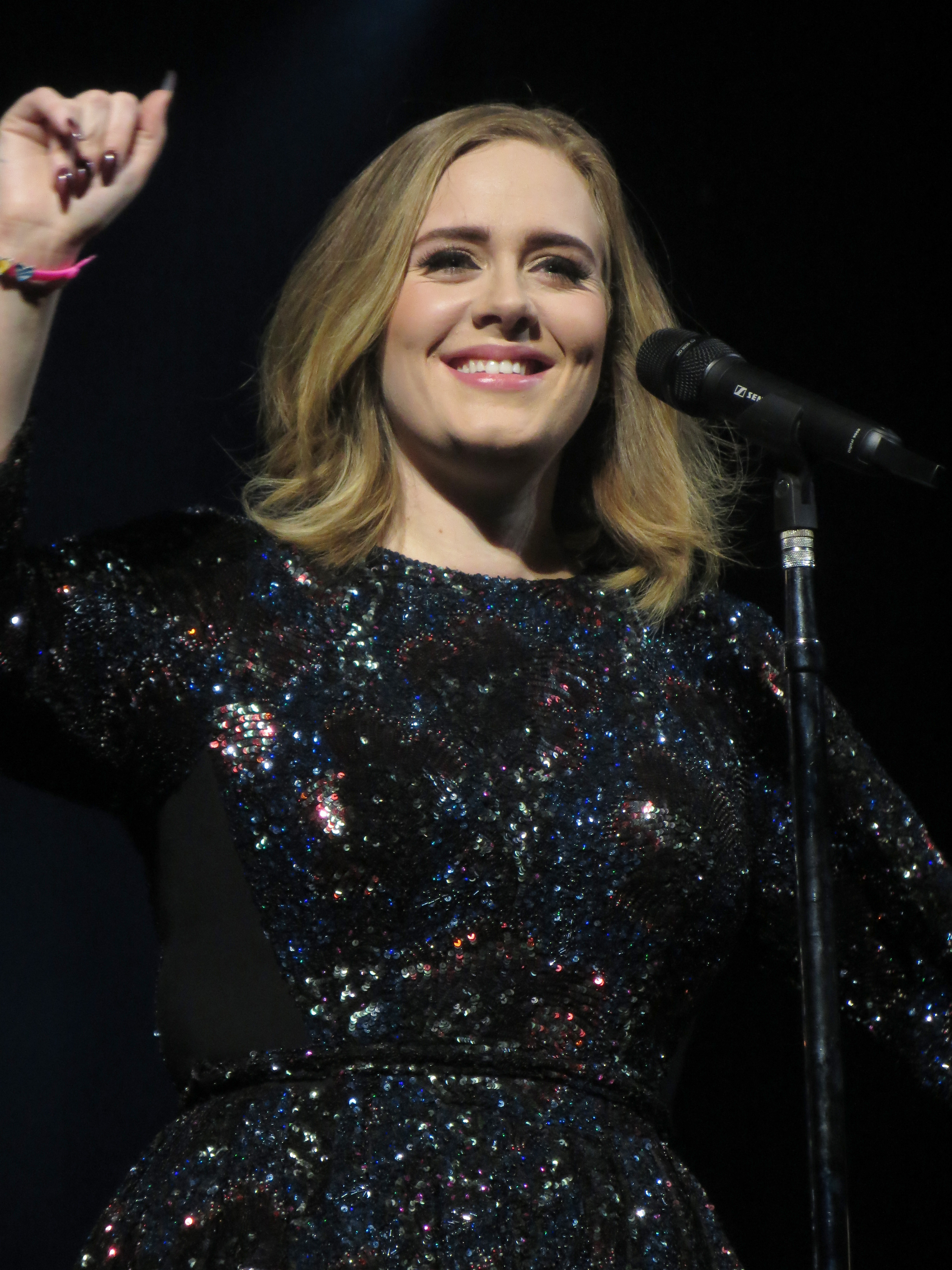
Adele's two albums released in the decade, 21 and 25, are the top two best-sellers of the 2010s, while 19 (released in 2008) also features at #13 for the decade.

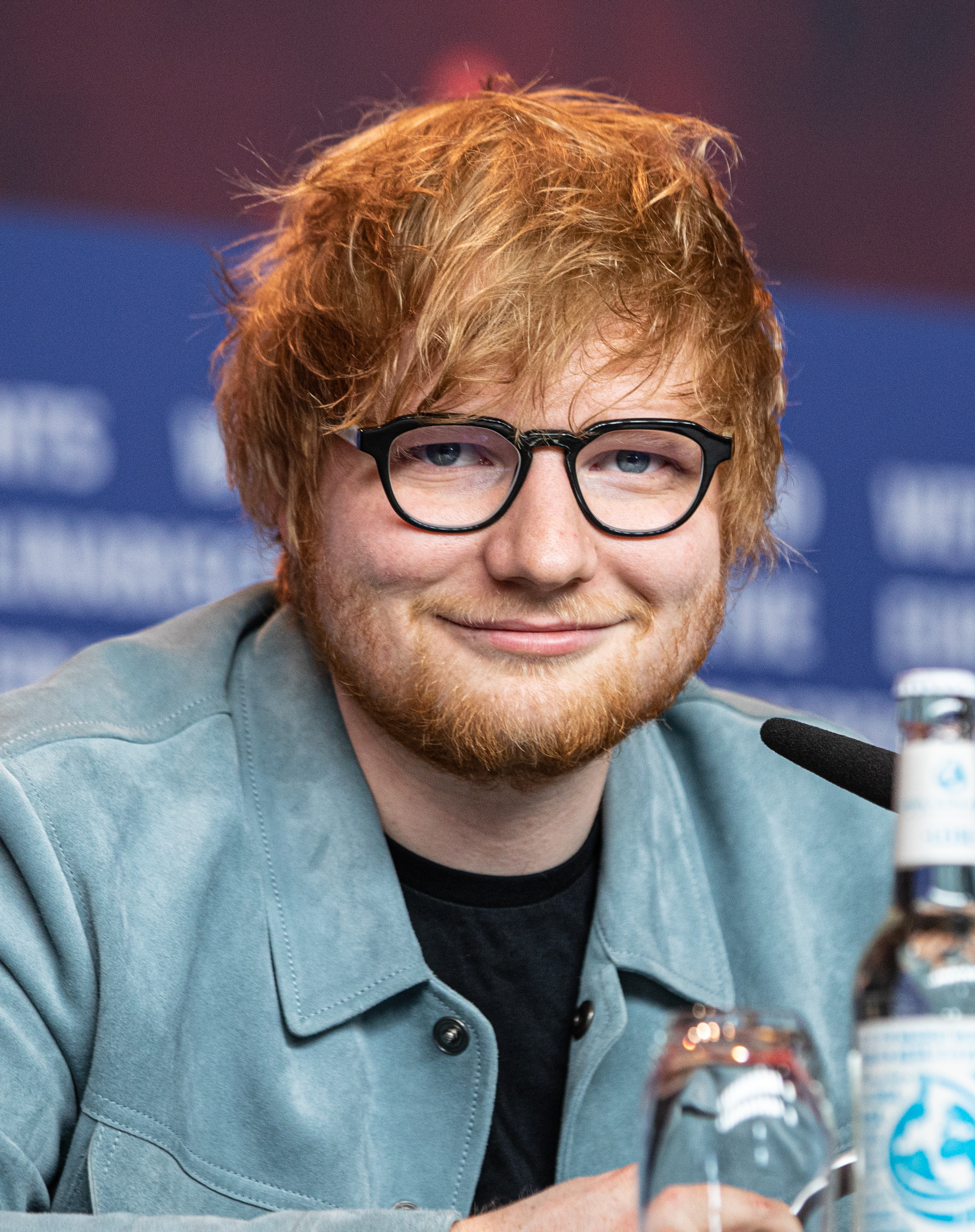
Ed Sheeran features three times in the top ten, with x (#3), ÷ (#4) and + (#7)

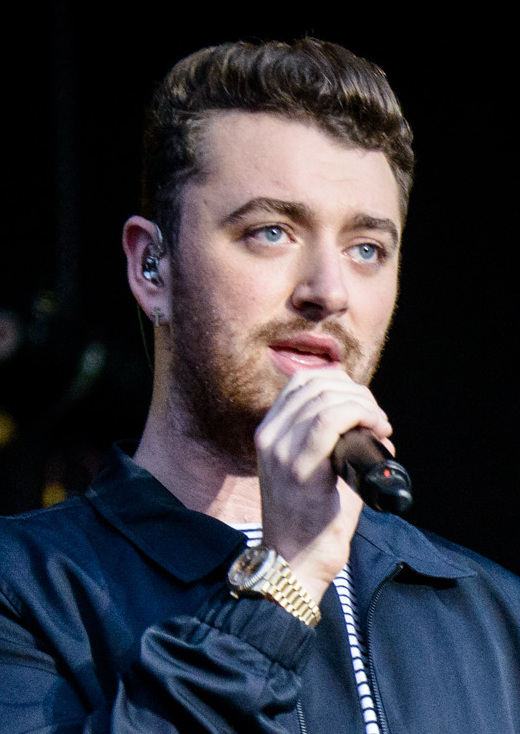
Sam Smith features twice on the list, with In the Lonely Hour (#6), which was the best-selling debut album of the 2010s, and The Thrill of It All (#93)

The UK Albums Chart is a music chart compiled by the Official Charts Company (OCC) that calculates the best-selling artist albums of the week in the United Kingdom. Since 2005, the chart has been based on the sales of both physical and digital albums, on the condition that the album was available in both formats. In January 2007, the rules were changed so that legal downloads of all albums, irrespective of whether a physical copy was available, were eligible to chart. Further changes occurred in February 2015 when audio streaming was included for the first time.

On 11 December 2019, the OCC announced their list of the top 100 best-selling albums between January 2010 and December 2019. The best-selling album of the decade is Adele's 21, which sold 6 million following its release in January 2011. Adele is also one of two artists to achieve three million-selling albums since 2010 with 19 (released in 2008 but sold over a million copies since 2010), 21 and 25. The other is Ed Sheeran with +, x and ÷. Sheeran is also the only artist to feature in the top 10 three times.

== Best-selling albums since 2010 ==
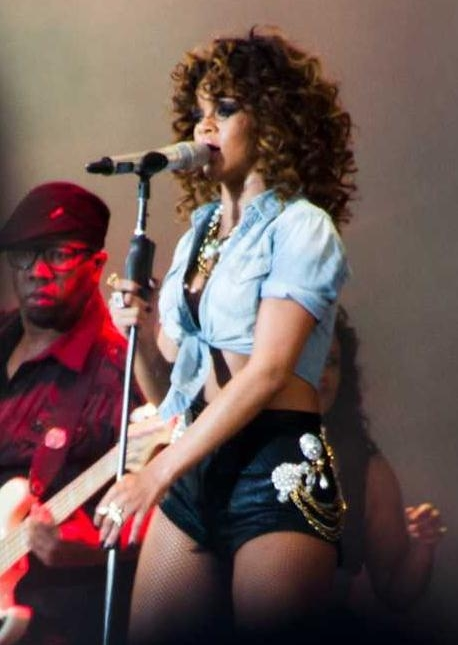
Rihanna has three albums on this list, with Loud (#11), Talk That Talk (#41) and Unapologetic (#80)

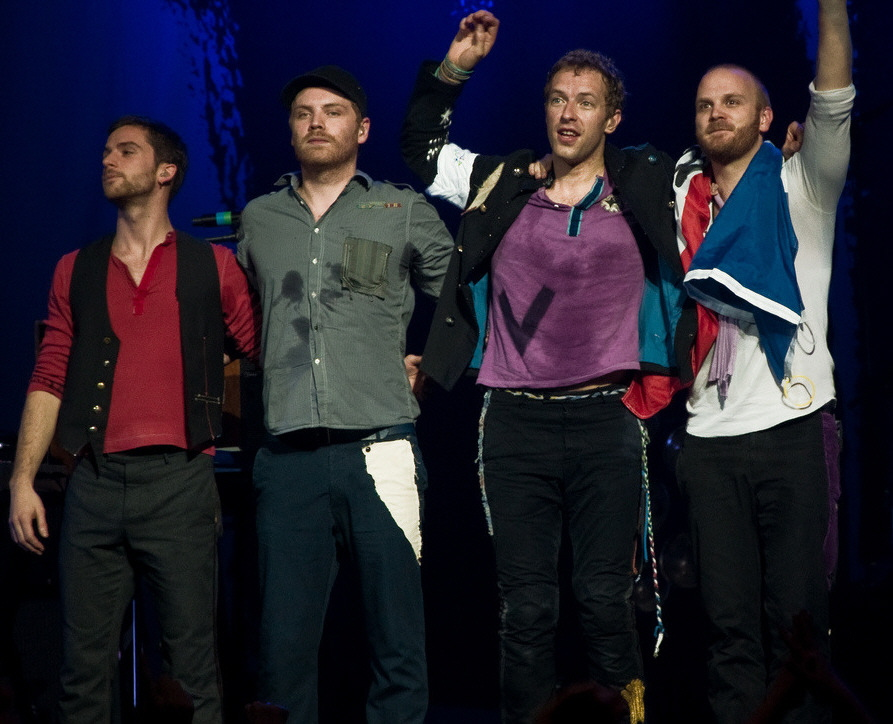
Coldplay have three albums, with Mylo Xyloto (#18), A Head Full of Dreams (#27) and Ghost Stories (#94)

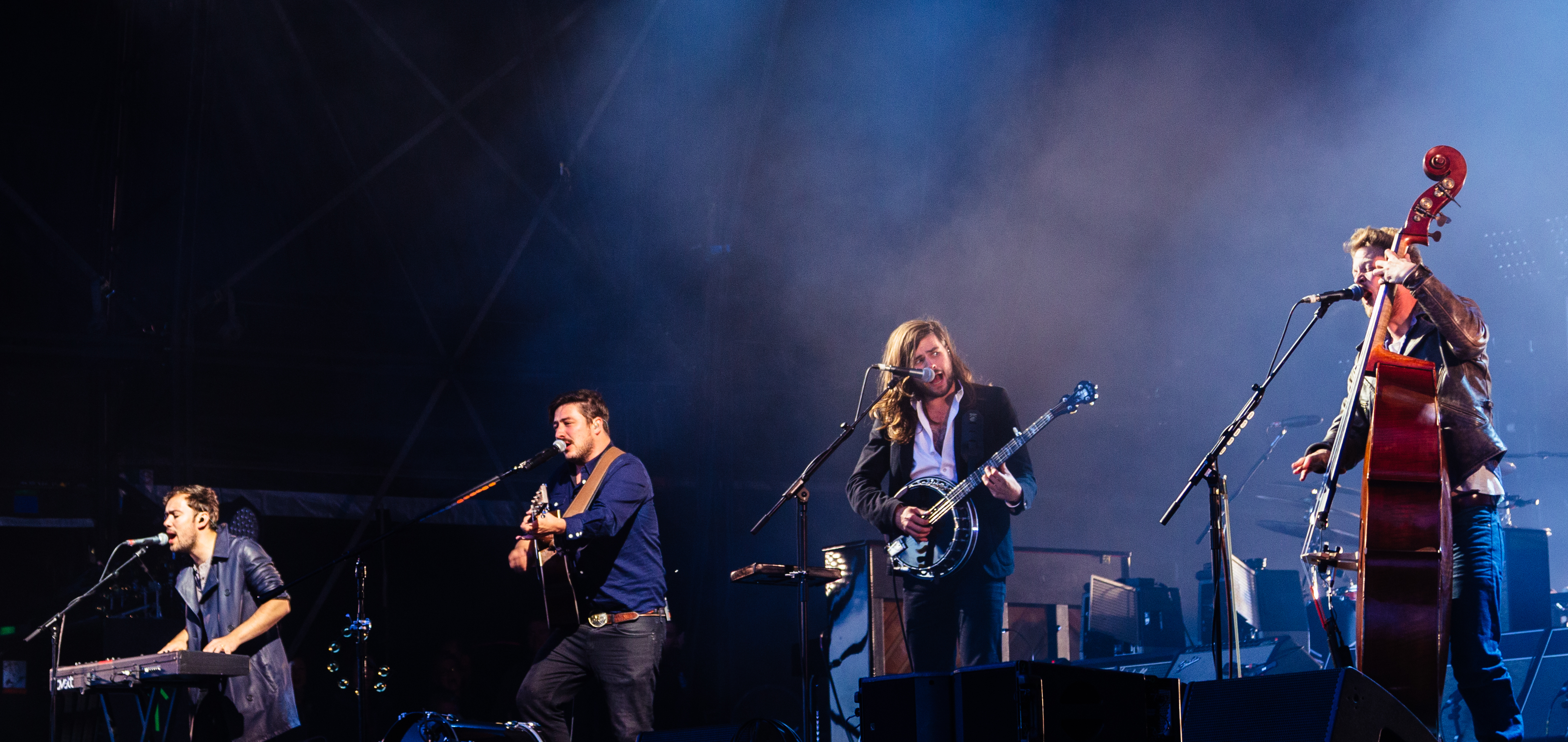
Mumford & Sons have two albums, with Sigh No More (#17) and Babel (#32)

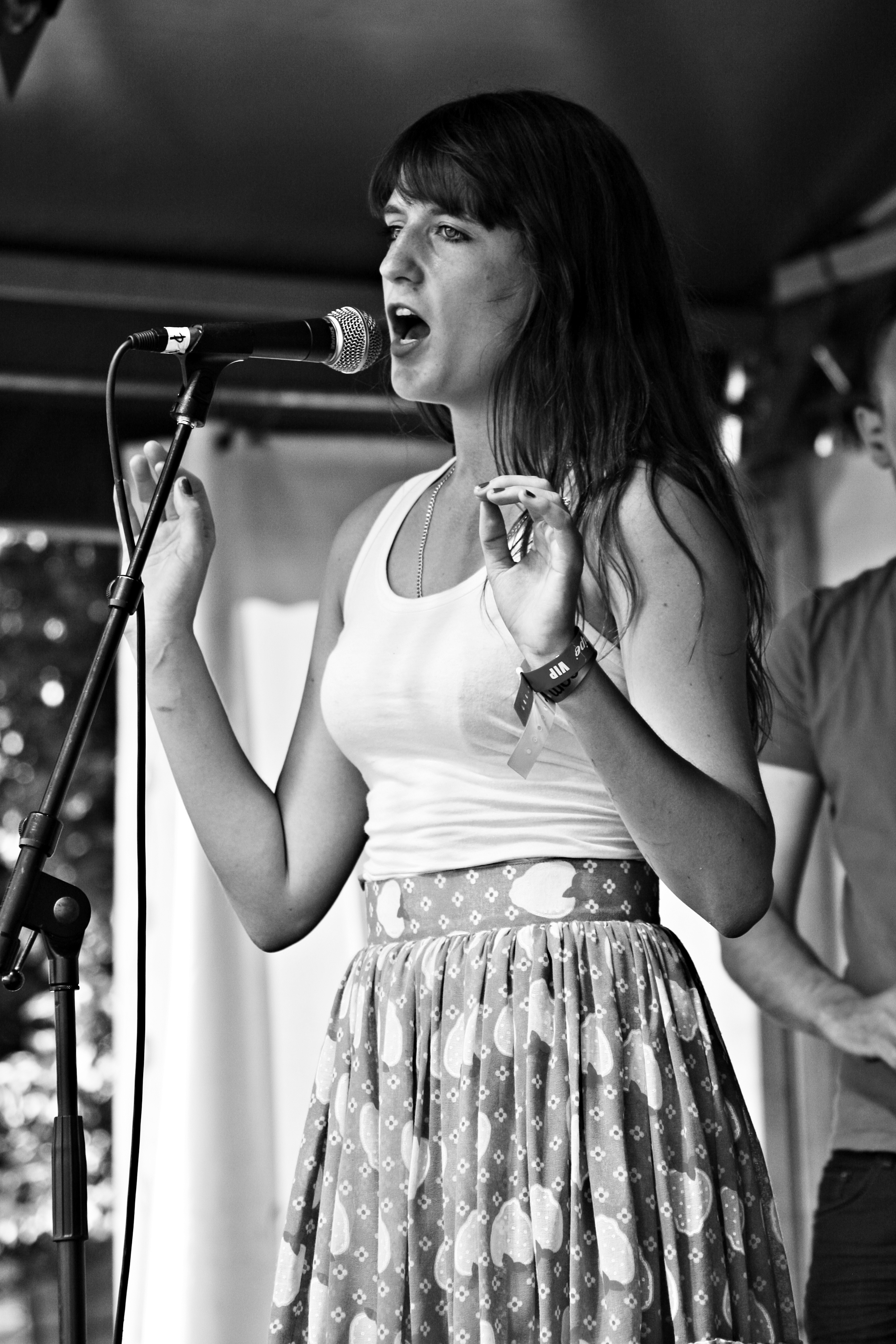
Florence and the Machine (lead singer Florence Welch pictured) feature twice, with Lungs (#24) and Ceremonials (#67)

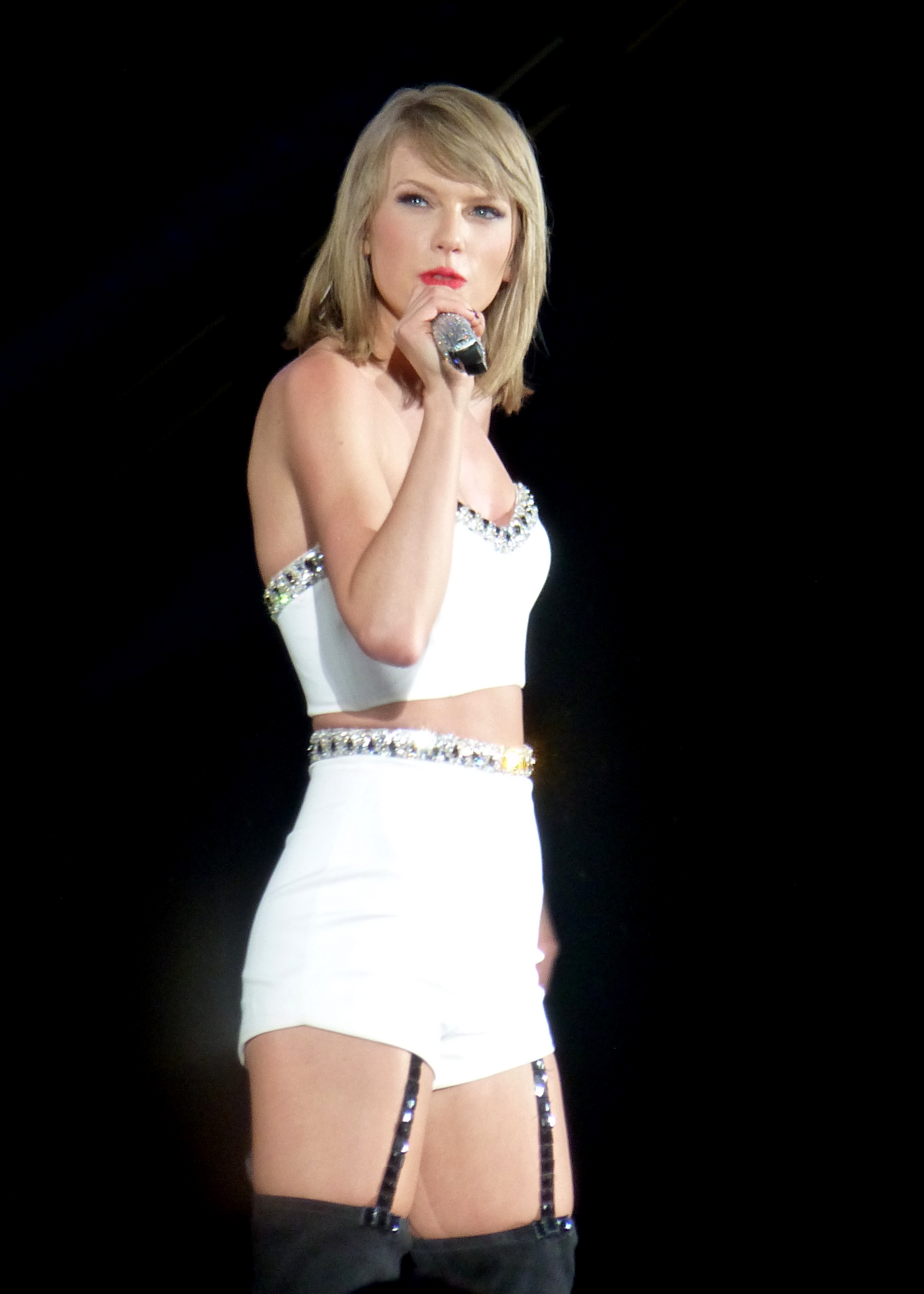
Taylor Swift features twice, 1989 (#25) and Red (#96)

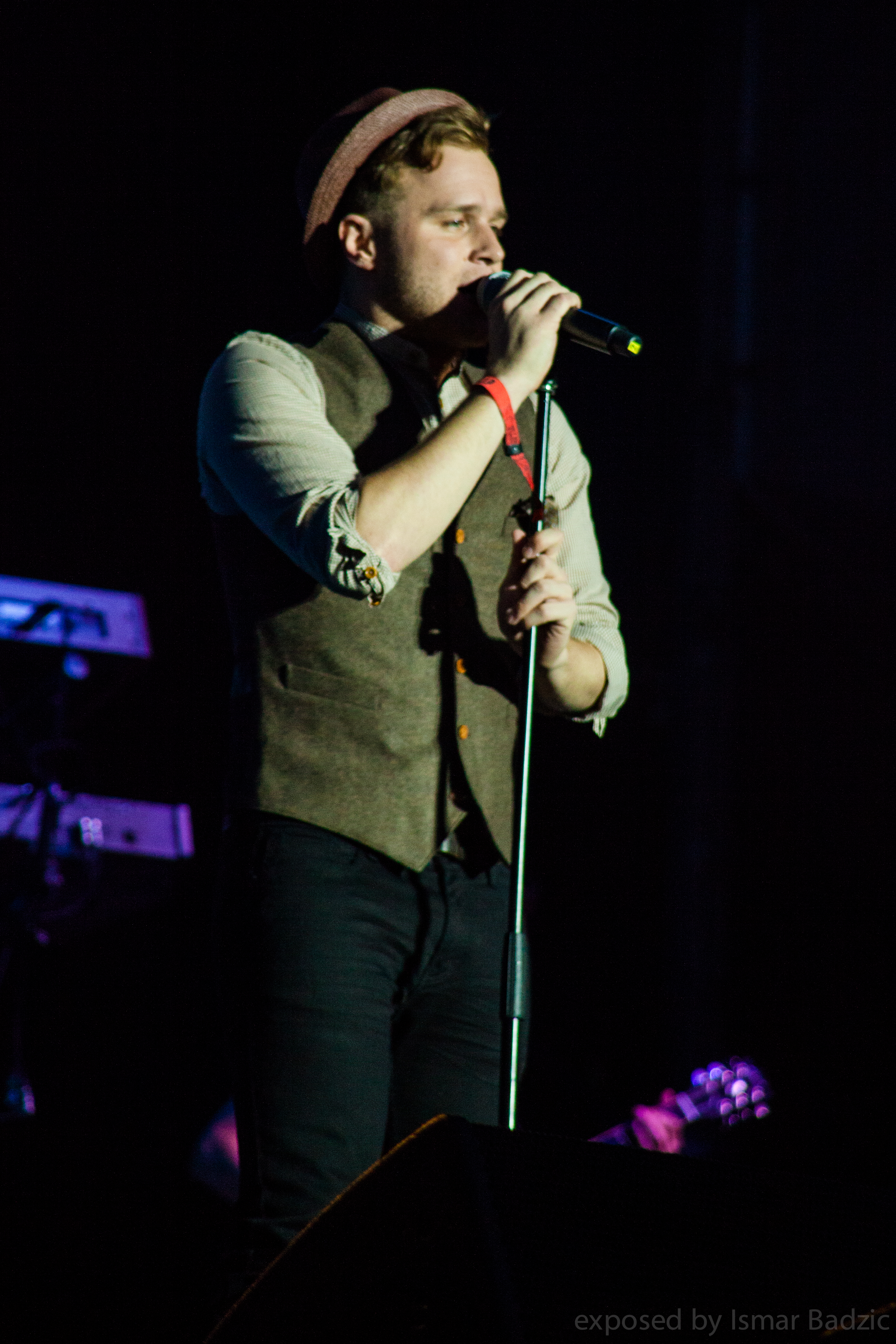
Olly Murs features four times, with Right Place Right Time (#19), In Case You Didn't Know (#32), Never Been Better (#65) and Olly Murs (#72)

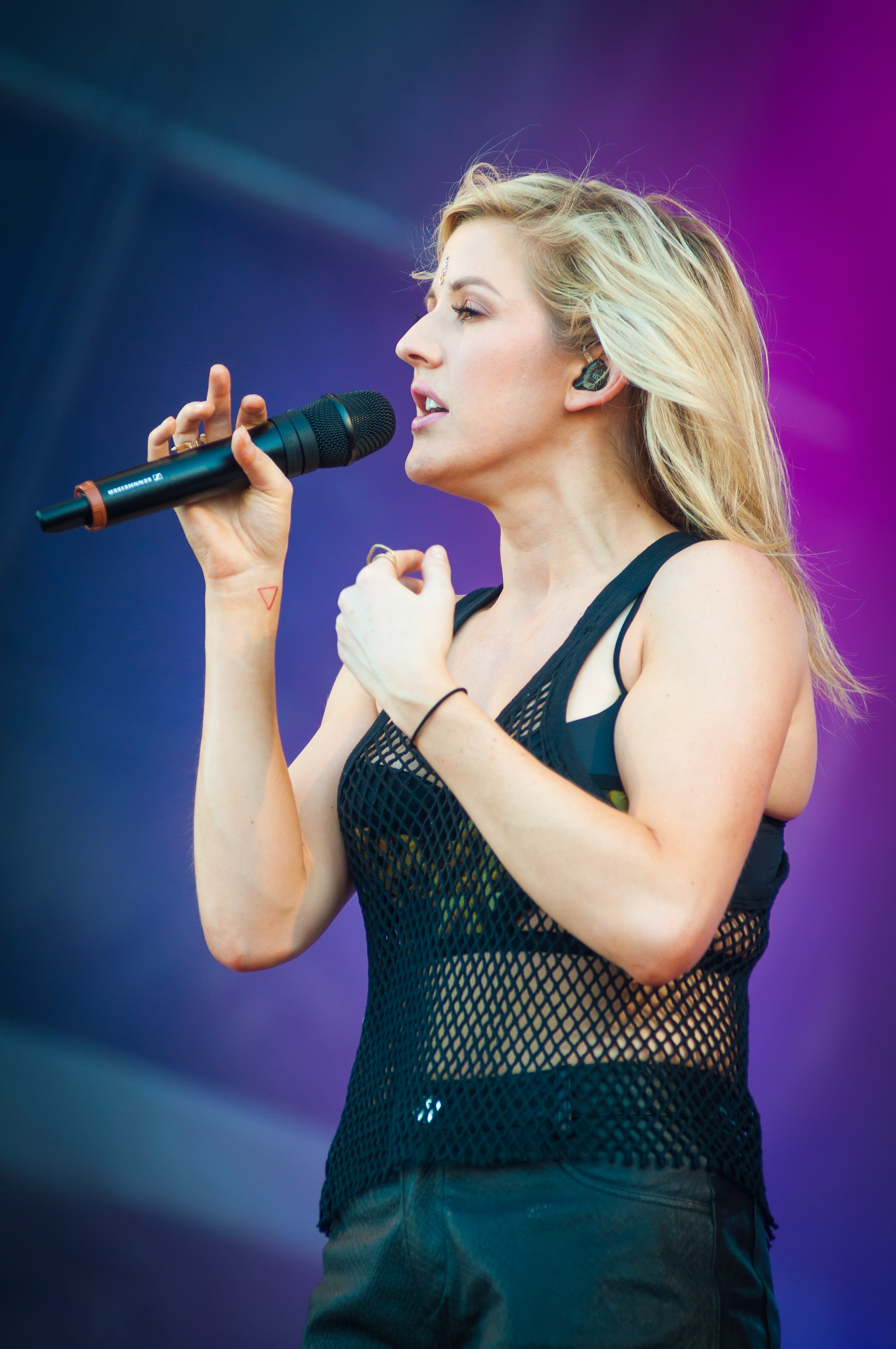
Ellie Goulding features twice, with Halcyon (#26) and Lights (#71)

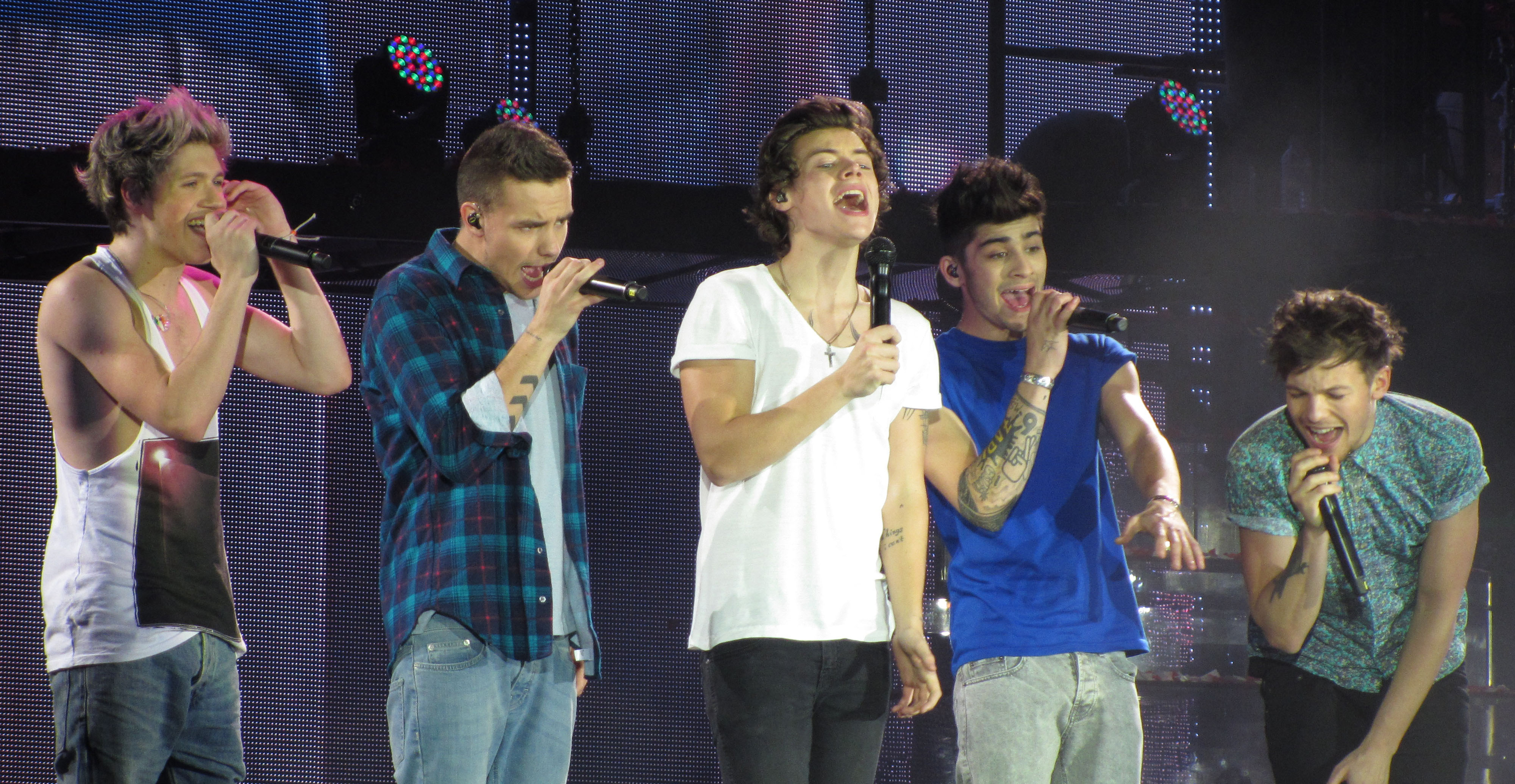
One Direction have three albums, with Up All Night (#29), Take Me Home (#45) and Four (#100)

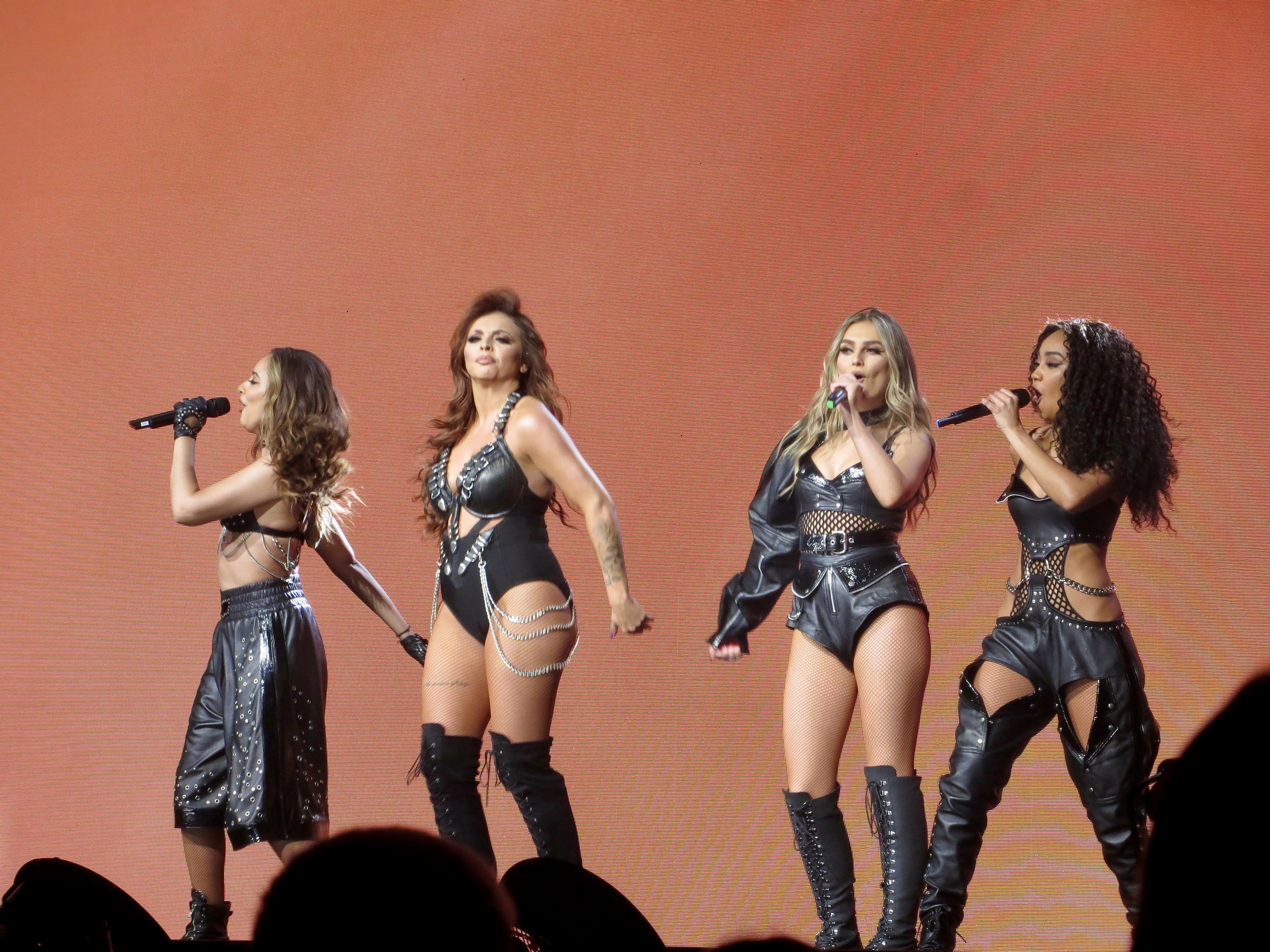
Little Mix feature twice, with Glory Days (#39) and Get Weird (#70)

No.	Title	Artist	Peak position	Year of release	Sales (where available) (Note: Sales)	No. of times Platinum (Note: The certifications are those given by the BPI as of December 2019.)
1	21	Adele	1	2011	6,000,000	17×
2	25	Adele	1	2015	3,600,000	12×
3	x	Ed Sheeran	1	2014	3,600,000	12×
4	÷	Ed Sheeran	1	2017	3,400,000	11×
5	Christmas	Michael Bublé	1	2011	2,950,000	9×
6	In the Lonely Hour	Sam Smith	1	2014	2,590,000	8×
7	+	Ed Sheeran	1	2011	2,443,000	8×
8	Our Version of Events	Emeli Sandé	1	2012	2,430,000	8×
9	Progress	Take That	1	2010	2,390,000	8×
10	The Greatest Showman	Various Artists	1	2017	2,130,000	7×
11	Loud	Rihanna	1	2010	1,997,500	6×
12	Crazy Love	Michael Bublé	1	2009†	1,890,300	6×
13	19	Adele	1	2008†	2,450,000	8×
14	AM	Arctic Monkeys	1	2013	1,800,000	6×
15	Doo-Wops & Hooligans	Bruno Mars	1	2010	1,713,000	5×
16	The Fame / The Fame Monster	Lady Gaga	1	2009†	1,578,000	5×
17	Sigh No More	Mumford & Sons	2	2009†	1,561,800	5×
18	Mylo Xyloto	Coldplay	1	2011	1,536,700	5×
19	Wanted on Voyage	George Ezra	1	2014	1,420,200	4×
20	Teenage Dream / Teenage Dream: The Complete Confection	Katy Perry	1	2010	1,304,325	4×
21	The Defamation of Strickland Banks	Plan B	1	2010	1,399,400	4×
22	Right Place Right Time	Olly Murs	1	2012	1,380,000	4×
23	Who You Are	Jessie J	2	2011	1,270,000	4×
24	Purpose	Justin Bieber	2	2015	1,200,000	4×
25	Lungs	Florence and the Machine	1	2009†	1,813,557	6×
26	1989	Taylor Swift	1	2014	1,500,000	5×
27	Halcyon / Halcyon Days	Ellie Goulding	1	2012	1,200,000	4×
28	A Head Full of Dreams	Coldplay	1	2015	1,375,805	4×
29	I Cry When I Laugh	Jess Glynne	1	2015	1,200,000	4×
30	Human	Rag'n'Bone Man	1	2017	1,200,000	4×
31	If I Can Dream	Elvis Presley	1	2015	1,062,457	4×
32	Babel	Mumford & Sons	1	2012	1,064,338	4×
33	Greatest Hits	Bon Jovi	2	2010	1,200,000	3×
34	Born to Die	Lana Del Rey	1	2012	1,174,000	3×
35	Up All Night	One Direction	1	2011	1,086,434	3×
36	In Case You Didn't Know	Olly Murs	1	2011	1,105,000	3×
37	Time Flies... 1994–2009	Oasis	1	2010	1,200,000	3×
38	Greatest Hits... So Far!!!	Pink	5	2010	1,050,000	3×
39	Glory Days	Little Mix	1	2016	1,014,800	3×
40	Sunny Side Up	Paolo Nutini	1	2009†	1,033,000	3×
41	Take Me Home	One Direction	1	2012	1,103,500	3×
42	Talk That Talk	Rihanna	1	2011	1,000,000	3×
43	Recovery	Eminem	1	2010	1,030,000	3×
44	Unorthodox Jukebox	Bruno Mars	1	2012	987,854	3×
45	Born This Way	Lady Gaga	1	2011	1,020,800	3×
46	Gold: Greatest Hits	ABBA	1	1992†		18×
47	Legend	Bob Marley and the Wailers	1	1984†		12×
48	18 Months	Calvin Harris	1	2012	923,861	3×
49	Staying at Tamara's	George Ezra	1	2018	1,000,300	3×
50	Rumours	Fleetwood Mac	1	1977†		13×
51	Curtain Call: The Hits	Eminem	1	2005†		7×
52	The Ultimate Collection	Whitney Houston	3	2007†		5×
53	Greatest Hits	Foo Fighters	4	2009†		4×
54	Back to Black	Amy Winehouse	1	2006†		13×
55	Bad Blood	Bastille	1	2013	1,000,640	3×
56	Midnight Memories	One Direction	1	2013		3×
57	Come Around Sundown	Kings of Leon	1	2010	915,300	3×
58	Number Ones	Michael Jackson	1	2003†		9×
59	The Truth About Love	Pink	1	2012	907,000	3×
60	Nothing but the Beat	David Guetta	1	2011		3×
61	The Very Best of Fleetwood Mac	Fleetwood Mac	6	2002		6×
62	Disc-Overy	Tinie Tempah	1	2010		3×
63	The Element of Freedom	Alicia Keys	1	2009†		3×
64	Lioness: Hidden Treasures	Amy Winehouse	1	2011		2×
65	Never Been Better	Olly Murs	1	2014	863,000	2×
66	All Over the World: The Very Best of Electric Light Orchestra	Electric Light Orchestra	1	2005†		3×
67	Ceremonials	Florence and the Machine	1	2011		2×
68	Chaos and the Calm	James Bay	1	2015	824,540	2×
69	Noel Gallagher's High Flying Birds	Noel Gallagher's High Flying Birds	1	2011	864,600	2×
70	Get Weird	Little Mix	2	2015	883,000	3×
71	Lights	Ellie Goulding	1	2010		2x
72	Olly Murs	Olly Murs	2	2010		2x
73	My World / My World 2.0	Justin Bieber	3	2010		2x
74	To Be Loved	Michael Bublé	1	2013		3x
75	Science & Faith	The Script	1	2010		2x
76	Every Kingdom	Ben Howard	4	2011		2x
77	Jake Bugg	Jake Bugg	1	2012		2x
78	A Perfect Contradiction	Paloma Faith	2	2014		2x
79	4	Beyoncé	1	2011		2x
80	Unapologetic	Rihanna	1	2012		2x
81	The Lady Killer	Cee Lo Green	3	2010		2x
82	No More Idols	Chase & Status	2	2011		2x
83	The Marshall Mathers LP 2	Eminem	1	2013		2x
84	Only By the Night	Kings of Leon	1	2008†		10x
85	Swings Both Ways	Robbie Williams	1	2013		2x
86	Decade in the Sun: Best of Stereophonics	Stereophonics	2	2008†		5x
87	In and Out of Consciousness: Greatest Hits 1990-2010	Robbie Williams	1	2010		2x
88	Fall to Grace	Paloma Faith	2	2012		2x
89	Greatest Hits	Queen	1	1981†		22x
90	Caustic Love	Paolo Nutini	1	2014		2x
91	If You Wait	London Grammar	2	2013		2x
92	Since I Saw You Last	Gary Barlow	2	2013		2x
93	The Thrill of It All	Sam Smith	1	2017		2x
94	Ghost Stories	Coldplay	1	2014	733,000	2x
95	Greatest Hits	Guns N' Roses	1	2004†		7x
96	Red	Taylor Swift	1	2012	695,000	2x
97	Greatest Hits	Westlife	4	2011		2x
98	Outta This World	JLS	2	2010		2x
99	Direct Hits	The Killers	5	2013		2x
100	Four	One Direction	1	2014	600,000	2x

† Released before 2010; only sales from 2010 onwards included

== Best-selling debut albums ==
No.	Debut album	Artist	Peak position	Year of release	Sales
1	In the Lonely Hour	Sam Smith	1	2014	2,590,000
2	19	Adele	1	2008†	2,450,000
3	+	Ed Sheeran	1	2011	2,443,000
4	Our Version of Events	Emeli Sandé	1	2012	2,430,000
5	Doo-Wops & Hooligans	Bruno Mars	1	2010	1,870,000
6	Wanted on Voyage	George Ezra	1	2014	1,420,000
7	Who You Are	Jessie J	2	2011	1,330,000
8	I Cry When I Laugh	Jess Glynne	1	2015	1,230,000
9	Human	Rag'n'Bone Man	1	2017	1,220,000
10	Born to Die	Lana Del Rey	1	2012	1,190,000
11	Up All Night	One Direction	2	2011	1,160,000
12	Bad Blood	Bastille	1	2013	975,000
13	Disc-Overy	Tinie Tempah	1	2010	905,000
14	Chaos and the Calm	James Bay	1	2015	867,000
15	Noel Gallagher's High Flying Birds	Noel Gallagher's High Flying Birds	1	2011	
16	Lights	Ellie Goulding	1	2010	841,000
17	Olly Murs	Olly Murs	2	2010	839,000
18	My World / My World 2.0	Justin Bieber	3	2010	
19	Every Kingdom	Ben Howard	4	2011	
20	Jake Bugg	Jake Bugg	1	2012	
21	The Lady Killer	CeeLo Green	3	2010	
22	If You Wait	London Grammar	2	2013	
23	Heaven	Rebecca Ferguson	3	2011	669,000
24	Night Visions	Imagine Dragons	2	2013	
25	Home	Rudimental	1	2013	
26	The 1975	The 1975	1	2013	
27	Seasons of My Soul	Rumer	3	2010	
28	Royal Blood	Royal Blood	1	2014	
29	Hozier	Hozier	3	2014	
30	Dua Lipa	Dua Lipa	3	2017	
31	All the Little Lights	Passenger	3	2013	
32	Divinely Uninspired to a Hellish Extent	Lewis Capaldi	1	2019	547,000
33	Communion	Years & Years	1	2015	
34	The Wanted	The Wanted	4	2010	
35	Deleted Scenes from the Cutting Room Floor	Caro Emerald	4	2011	
36	The Lumineers	The Lumineers	8	2012	
37	Settle	Disclosure	1	2013	
38	Chapter One	Ella Henderson	1	2014	476,000
39	Good Ol' Fashioned Love	The Overtones	4	2010	
40	The Balcony	Catfish and the Bottlemen	10	2014	

== See also ==
- List of best-selling albums of the 21st century in the United Kingdom
- List of best-selling singles of the 2010s in the United Kingdom
