= No More Sad Songs =

Single by Little Mix featuring Machine Gun Kelly

from the album Glory Days
- Released: 3 March 2017
- Genre: Electro; tropical-pop
- Length: 3:27; 3:45 (Machine Gun Kelly remix)
- Label: Syco
- Songwriters: Emily Warren; Edvard Førre Erfjord; Henrik Michelsen; Tash Phillips; Colson Baker (additional)
- Producers: Electric; Joe Kearns

Little Mix singles chronology
"Touch" (2016)	"No More Sad Songs" (2017)	"Power" (2017)

Machine Gun Kelly singles chronology
"Bad Things" (2016)	"No More Sad Songs" (2017)	"At My Best" (2017)

Music video
- "No More Sad Songs" on YouTube

"No More Sad Songs" is a song by British girl group Little Mix, from the group's fourth studio album, Glory Days (2016). A remixed version of the song featuring American rapper Machine Gun Kelly, was released on March 3, 2017, as the third single from the album. This version of the song is included on the reissue of the group's fourth studio album Glory Days: The Platinum Edition (2017). "No More Sad Songs" was met with positive reviews. The song is an electro and tropical pop track, and its lyrics address a break up. The song reached number fifteen on the UK Singles Chart, becoming the group's sixteenth top twenty hit there. The single also charted in Ireland, New Zealand, and the Philippines. It has since been certified platinum in the United Kingdom and Brazil.

== Background and release ==
A remixed version of the song, featuring rapper Machine Gun Kelly, was announced as the third single from Glory Days on 1 March 2017 and was released on 3 March 2017.

== Critical reception ==
Digital Spy's writer Lewis Corner stated: "Now that the break-up has well and truly sunk in, the girls are trying to put it behind them by getting back out there and enjoying their lives again. The one request? No more sad songs, obviously. "I'm still trying to put this behind me / I still want to know who's taking you home," Perrie admits on the verse, before it bursts into a spirited electronic-tinged chorus that you can really get swept up in with its addictive squiggles. It's a beautifully defiant twist on a subtle club banger, and Perrie's big vocal run at the end is a real moment."

Attitude named the song #7 on their list of 32 greatest Little Mix singles writing "underrated based on its chart peak but this mid-tempo sad-banger was an immediate highlight and obvious single from the moment the album was released."

== Music video ==
The music video for the song was released on 29 March 2017. It is set in Nashville and based on Coyote Ugly.

== Charts ==
=== Weekly charts ===
Chart (2017)	Peak position
Euro Digital Songs (Billboard)	17
Ireland (IRMA)	25
New Zealand Heatseekers (RMNZ)	9
Scotland Singles (Official Charts)	4
UK Singles (Official Charts)	15

=== Year-end charts ===
Chart (2017)	Position
UK Singles (Official Charts Company)	65

== Certifications ==
Region	Certification	Certified units/sales
Brazil (Pro-Música Brasil)	Platinum	60,000^{‡}
New Zealand (RMNZ)	Platinum	30,000^{‡}
United Kingdom (BPI)	Platinum	848,000
^{‡} Sales+streaming figures based on certification alone.

== Release history ==
List of regions, release dates, showing formats, label and references
Region	Date	Format(s)	Label	Ref.
United States	3 March 2017	Digital download; streaming	Syco	
Italy	28 April 2017	Contemporary hit radio	Sony	
