= Power (Little Mix song) =

2017 song by Little Mix

Single by Little Mix featuring Stormzy

from the album Glory Days
- Released: 26 May 2017
- Genre: Electropop; industrial pop
- Length: 4:02
- Label: Syco
- Songwriters: Dan Omelio; Camille Purcell; James Abrahart; Michael Omari (add.)
- Producers: Electric; Joe Kearns; Matt Rad; Steve James

Little Mix singles chronology
"No More Sad Songs" (2017)	"Power" (2017)	"Reggaetón Lento (Remix)" (2017)

Stormzy singles chronology
"All Time Low (Remix)" (2017)	"Power" (2017)	"Cigarettes & Cush" (2017)

Music video
- "Power" on YouTube

"Power" is a song released by British girl group Little Mix, featuring rapper Stormzy. It was released as the fourth and final single from Little Mix's fourth studio album Glory Days. The remix version appears on Glory Days: The Platinum Edition, the reissue of Glory Days.

Cited as a "girl power and gay anthem", "Power" lyrically addresses sexism and equality. The music video, which features drag queens, holds a political message in reference of marches being held for "gender equality" and protests. The song was commercially successful, peaking at number six on the UK Singles Chart, becoming the group's eleventh top ten single there. In 2018, the song was chosen by WWE as the official theme song for their first ever women's Royal Rumble. In July 2022, the song received renewed attention after going viral on the video-sharing social platform TikTok.

== Background and release ==
Little Mix announced on May 19, 2017, through their social media pages that "Power" would be released as the fourth single after becoming a fan favourite. The group also teased a remix version for the track, which features guest vocals from British grime rapper Stormzy. On May 26, 2017, the song was released onto all streaming platforms, while the cover art for the single was unveiled a few days prior and was created by a fan.

== Production and composition ==
"Power" is primarily an electropop and industrial pop track. The group worked with producers Electric, Joe Kear, Matt Rad and Steve James including songwriters Dan Omelio, Camille Purcell, James Abrahart, and Michael Omari who is credited as a songwriter on the remix version for "Power".

== Reception ==
The track was generally well received, with TimeOut magazine calling the song "brilliant", despite being "OTT" (over the top), but some fans did criticize the decision to feature a male rapper on a song about female empowerment. Attitude included the song number four on their list of 32 greatest Little Mix singles of all time writing "Power has always a standout single on Glory Days. Although it seemed to invoke a marmite reaction from some fans when released, it is now become a fan favourite, especially with Little Mix's huge gay following."

== Music video ==
The music video was released on 9 June 2017 and was directed by Hannah Lux Davis, and filmed in Los Angeles. It features each member of Little Mix as the leader of their own faction of women. Jesy Nelson leads a group of leather-clad bikers, Leigh-Anne Pinnock leads a fashion-forward street crew, Perrie Edwards leads a group of hippies who were a big part of the 1960s–70s American feminist movement, and Jade Thirlwall leads a troupe of drag queens with representation of LGBTQA+ scenes. In the end, each faction comes together in a show of feminine power reminiscent of the Women's March.

Gabe Bergado for Teen Vogue wrote:

"There's definitely a lot of empowering and political messages throughout the video — just the imagery of the march is reminiscent of the many protests and marches throughout the past couple of months championing gender equality and the rights of disenfranchised people. On top of that, people are literally holding up signs that say "LOVE" and "girl power" and one marcher with a rainbow flag.

The music video, also features a cameo from famous drag queens Courtney Act, Alaska Thunderfuck and Willam, also known as The AAA Girls. Towards the end of the video it features a cameo from Little Mix's mothers, who appear at the end of the video to march with them. Stormzy's scenes, which were filmed separately from the rest of the video, feature him in a barbershop having his hair cut.

== Commercial performance ==
On May 26, 2017 "Power" entered at number 27 on the UK Singles Chart, becoming the group's seventh top 40 hit on the chart. It later reached a new peak of number six, becoming the group's eleventh top ten single there. As of 2021, it ranks as the group's fourth biggest song on the chart.

The single peaked at number seven in New Zealand. It would then go on to peak inside the top twenty in Ireland and Belgium and crack the top 40 in Latvia. It also charted in Romania.

=== Year-end lists ===
Power on year-end lists
Critic/Publication	List	Rank	Ref.
Official Charts	Biggest Summer Songs of 2017	9	

== Charts ==
=== Weekly charts ===
Weekly chart performance for "Power"
Chart (2017)	Peak position
Belgium (Ultratip Bubbling Under Flanders)	20
Euro Digital Songs (Billboard)	11
France Digital Song Sales (SNEP)	62
Ireland (IRMA)	17
Latvia (Latvijas Top 40)	31
New Zealand Heatseekers (RMNZ)	7
Philippines (Philippine Hot 100)	69
Romania (Airplay 100)	100
Scottish Singles Sales (Official Charts)	2
UK Singles (Official Charts)	6

=== Year-end charts ===
Year-end chart performance for "Power"
Chart (2017)	Position
UK Singles (Official Charts Company)	33

== Certifications ==
Certifications for "Power"
Region	Certification	Certified units/sales
Brazil (Pro-Música Brasil)	2× Platinum	120,000^{‡}
Denmark (IFPI Danmark)	Gold	45,000^{‡}
France (SNEP)	Gold	100,000^{‡}
New Zealand (RMNZ)	2× Platinum	60,000^{‡}
Poland (ZPAV)	Platinum	50,000^{‡}
United Kingdom (BPI)	3× Platinum	1,800,000^{‡}
^{‡} Sales+streaming figures based on certification alone.

== Awards ==
Year	Nominee / work	Award	Result	Ref.
2017	"Power" (featuring Stormzy)	Pop Song of the Year	Won	
2018	"Power" (featuring Stormzy)	Best Song	Won	

== In popular culture ==
Since its release, "Power" has been regarded as a girl power and gay anthem. In 2018, it was selected as the official theme song for WWE's first ever Women's Royal Rumble. The solo version was featured as a lip-sync song on the fifth episode of the first series of RuPaul's Drag Race UK, where Little Mix member Jade Thirlwall was a guest judge. In 2022, the song was used in the official trailer for RuPaul's Drag Race: UK vs. the World.

The song has been covered by various artists, for an example, South Korean singer Ryujin who's a member of the girl group Itzy, discussed how during their evaluations as trainees "Power" was often one of the songs they covered. In 2019, the song was used in a dance cover for a TV Series in South Korea called Queendom, and showcases a dance unit that was formed of Moonbyul from Mamamoo, Kim Chanmi from AOA, Jung Yein from Lovelyz, Yooa from Oh My Girl, Soojin from (G)I-dle, and Eunji from Brave Girls. In 2021 Kpop girl group Hot Issue, covered the song for 1theK Originals. In 2022, the song was covered and performed on a South Korean reality competition called My Teenage Girl.

== Release history ==
List of regions, release dates, showing formats, label and references
Region	Date	Format(s)	Label	Ref.
Various	26 May 2017	Digital download; streaming	Syco	
