= Black Magic (Little Mix song) =

2015 song by Little Mix

Single by Little Mix

from the album Get Weird
- Released: 21 May 2015
- Recorded: 2014
- Studio: Tileyard Studios (London, England)
- Genre: Dance-pop; teen pop
- Length: 3:31
- Label: Syco; Columbia
- Songwriters: Edvard Førre Erfjord; Henrik Michelsen; Ed Drewett; Camille Purcell
- Producer: Electric

Little Mix singles chronology
"Salute" (2014)	"Black Magic" (2015)	"Love Me Like You" (2015)

Music video
- "Black Magic" on YouTube

"Black Magic" is a song recorded by British girl group Little Mix, released in May 2015 through Syco Music and Columbia Records as the lead single from their third studio album, Get Weird (2015). It is a teen pop and dance pop song with influences of '80s pop music. The single received acclaim from music critics upon release, who praised it for its catchy sound and upbeat tempo, and comparisons were made with the songs from the group's debut album, DNA (2012).

"Black Magic" topped the UK Singles Chart, the first Little Mix single to do so since "Wings" in 2012 and the first song by an all-female group to reach number one since 2013. It remained at number one for three consecutive weeks, becoming the first song by a girl group to spend more than a single week at number one since "About You Now" by Sugababes in 2007. It was the fifth-biggest selling girl group single in the UK between 1994 and 2019.

Outside of the United Kingdom, it peaked within the top ten in Australia, Ireland and Israel, and charted in 16 other territories. On the Billboard Hot 100, the single peaked at number 67, becoming the group's highest-charting single in the US. As of 2021, the song has been certified triple platinum in the UK by the British Phonographic Industry (BPI) and gold or higher in ten other countries, including diamond in Brazil. The song was nominated for Choice Love Song at the 2015 Teen Choice Awards, and for British Single of the Year and British Video of the Year at the 2016 Brit Awards. As of 2025, the corresponding music video has received more than a billion views on YouTube. Billboard ranked the song as one of the 100 Greatest Girl Group Songs of All Time.

== Background and release ==
"We always like to do something that people wouldn't expect us to come out with. The Salute campaign was a lot darker and a bit more R&B [...] that's why it took so long because we were looking for something that would surprise people. We wanted to change the game a bit, and 'Black Magic' is very pop."

— Jade Thirlwall talking to Digital Spy about the song.

On 4 July 2014, Little Mix announced that they would cancel the US leg of their second concert tour, The Salute Tour, to focus on recording their third album. The group said that the new album would be "stronger" and "better" than their two previous albums, DNA (2012) and Salute (2013). In February 2015, Little Mix revealed that they had chosen the lead single from their third studio album and also said that it has a "whole new sound" compared to previous material. They described the song as "a risk" and said that it is completely different from what they have done before. Album delays were attributed to the fact that Little Mix's original output was scrapped because they thought "they could do better".

The song's title was accidentally revealed by member Leigh-Anne Pinnock's mother on Twitter on 21 April 2015 when she tweeted "#MixersAreExcitedForBlackMagic yesss mixers it's the new single and it's fantastic". However, the tweet was deleted shortly after it was posted. On 14 May 2015, Little Mix revealed that the song was titled "Black Magic", after the single's cover art surfaced on music identification service Shazam. The single's cover features the group in front of red school lockers with the group's logo featured above the group in a yellow colour and the title of the song below in white. "Black Magic" was scheduled to premiere on 26 May, but was later moved forward to 21 May, after the single leaked online the day before. The single was released digitally in the UK on 20 May. It was released as a CD single in Europe on 17 July 2015, and in Japan on 12 August 2015 with an exclusive Japanese edition.

== Composition ==
"Black Magic"
A 17-second sample of "Black Magic", where Little Mix sing the first part of the chorus of the song.

"Black Magic" is a dance-pop and teen pop song that runs for a total length of three minutes and thirty-one seconds. It was written by Edvard Førre Erfjord, Henrik Michelsen, Ed Drewett and Camille Purcell, and was produced by the Norwegian production duo Electric, who previously worked on the group's second studio album. The song's rhythm is influenced by the sounds of the 1980s dance music. The song has a quick tempo of 112 beats per minute and is composed in the key of E major. The group's vocal range in the song runs from G#_{3} to E_{5}.

Talking about the song's message, the group said, "we are the girls with the secret potion and we're going to give it to all the other girls that want to get the man they want to get", with Pinnock adding that "It [the potion] is a metaphor for having confidence to get your man".

== Critical reception ==
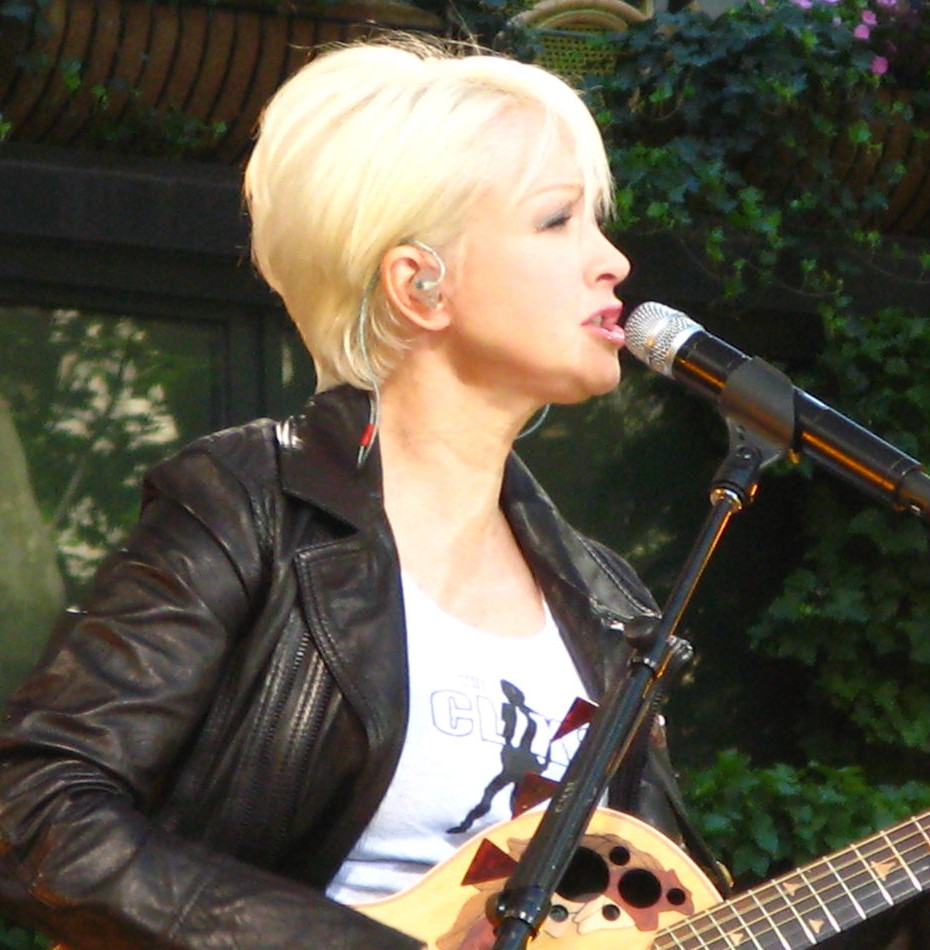
"Black Magic" was likened to Cyndi Lauper's "Girls Just Want to Have Fun" by several music critics for its "falling in love" refrain.

Upon its release, "Black Magic" was acclaimed by music critics, who welcomed Little Mix's new '80s-influenced sound. Matt Bagwell of The Huffington Post called the single "one of the best pop releases of the year", complimenting its "killer chorus" and "trademark call to arms chant", while writing that "Black Magic" is "significantly better" than Britney Spears and Iggy Azalea's single "Pretty Girls", which Little Mix co-wrote. Lewis Corner of Digital Spy gave the song a 5 out of 5 star rating, saying "not only was it the perfect song for this point in their career, but one powerful enough to bewitch those beyond their expected demographic."

Ariana Bacle of Entertainment Weekly described the song as "bouncy" and "incredibly catchy". Jocelyn Vena of Billboard noted Little Mix's "soaring vocals over a shimmery melody". The Guardian compared the song to the "carefree joy" of Whitney Houston's "I Wanna Dance with Somebody (Who Loves Me)" and Cyndi Lauper's "Girls Just Want to Have Fun", while also comparing the song to those of their debut album DNA.

Renowned for Sound described the song as "fun and catchy" and went on to compare the song to the group's previous work for its familiar chemistry and the overall feel good vibe it presents, "it's generic pop with a snappy melody and a neat call and response bridge". Madeline Roth of MTV stated that the track "is an up-tempo jam featuring summery vibes and bewitching lyrics". Writing for Idolator, Mike Wass says that the song is "preternaturally catchy" and describes the chorus of the song as "addictive".

Attitude ranked the song at number 10 on their list of 32 greatest Little Mix singles, writing "Around the time of 'Black Magic', the girls were in an uncertain place, with fears of even being dropped. But this came out of nowhere and stormed in at Number One for an impressive three weeks, kick-starting new level of stardom for the girls." Rolling Stone also added that "Black Magic is an enthusiastic, dance-pop stomper".

The Big Top 40 named "Black Magic" as one of the best pop songs of 2015. Time Out also included it on their list of 100 best songs of 2015. PopSugar included it on their list as one of the 50 Most Iconic Pop Music Videos of the Decade. Billboard ranked the song at number 34 on their list of 100 Greatest Girl Group Songs of All Time.

== Commercial performance ==
"Black Magic" entered at number one on the UK Singles Chart, becoming Little Mix's first UK number-one since their 2012 single "Wings". It was the first song by an all-female group to reach number one since "I Love It" by Icona Pop in 2013, and it spent three consecutive weeks at number one, becoming the longest-running number-one by a girl group since "About You Now" by Sugababes in 2007. In its first week, the song had combined sales of 112,684, including 1.19 million streams. In its second week the song remained at number one and had combined sales of 65,720, including almost 1.88 million streams. In its third week the song continued at number one with combined sales of 59,887, including 1.97 million streams. It was the sixth-biggest selling song in the UK between June and August 2015. On 13 November 2015, the song was certified platinum in the United Kingdom for combined sales exceeding 600,000, becoming the first single by a UK girl group in more than a decade to achieve a platinum certification. In 2019, "Black Magic" was named the fifth-biggest selling girl group single in the UK between 1994 and 2019. As of November 2022, it was one of the top 200 most-streamed songs of all time in the UK.

On the Irish Singles Chart, "Black Magic" peaked at number three. In Australia, the song debuted at number 25 on the Australian Singles Chart and peaked at number eight two weeks later. The song also charted on both Ultratip Belgian airplay charts, where it peaked at number four and number 37 on the Flanders and Wallonia charts, respectively. It also topped the European digital downloads chart. On the Israeli television airplay chart, the song peaked at number five.

In the United States, the song entered at number 99 on the US Billboard Hot 100 in the week ending 29 August 2015, becoming the group's first entry on the chart since "Wings". In its second week on the Billboard Hot 100, it climbed 31 spots to number 68; it achieved a new peak of 67 in its third week on the Hot 100, becoming the group's highest charting US single to date.

== Music video ==
=== Background and synopsis ===
"Yes, we have [filmed a music video] and we're excited. [...] So basically, it's completely different from whatever we've done before. We're acting this time, there's no dancing whatsoever and we all play different characters."

— Jesy Nelson talking to KISS FM about the music video.

On 21 May 2015, Little Mix posted the audio video of the song on their Vevo account. The music video for the song was directed by Director X, and was filmed at the University of Southern California on 22–23 May 2015 in Los Angeles. Talking about the video, Jesy Nelson also said in an interview in Capital FM that "We [the group] are acting which is exciting! They're like little mini movies which is exciting". Jade Thirlwall also said that "It's nothing like we've done before and it's like a movie". Just one day before its release, Leigh-Anne Pinnock posted on Twitter: "OMG! Can't believe the #BlackMagicVideo is live tomorrow on @Vevo_UK at 8am! So excited for you guys to see!". The video premiered online on the group's Vevo channel on 29 May 2015. Following the video's release, the group posted several tweets on their account reacting to the fans' opinions on the video.

The video opens with Little Mix, who are introduced as nerds. On their way out of school, they believe an attractive male student to be waving at them, only to be shoved away by a popular female student. At the local library, a spellbook falls on Jade's head. That night, the girls use the book to gain magical powers, and they undergo magical makeovers to become Little Mix. The girls then enact a number of pranks on their classmates: they make the girl from the previous day constantly flatulate, cause girls to fall in love with a geeky boy, and transform a classroom into a dance party.

=== Reception ===
Little Mix as seen walking down the hallway of the campus in the music video for "Black Magic"; this scene was inspired from the 1996 cult film The Craft.

The video received positive reviews by both fans and critics. Critics noted references to witch-themed films and television shows such as The Craft, Charmed and Sabrina, the Teenage Witch, as well as the music video for "Too Much" by the Spice Girls. Both Rigby from Digital Spy and Forrester from the Daily Mirror described the video as "spellbinding". Additionally, Forrester from Mirror said that the group "turned to Katy Perry for inspiration and the results are hilarious" and also compared the scene of the girls walking down the hall with the 1999 film She's All That. Lucy Wood of Cosmopolitan said that the video is "a brilliant combo of Clueless, Sabrina The Teenage Witch and The Craft all in one go". Capital FM wrote, "Take a dash of Sabrina The Teenage Witch, add a pinch of Mean Girls and throw in a little Charmed, and you've got yourself an INCREDIBLE video!"

The acclaim for the music video was not universal. Mace Entertainment criticised the message of the video, saying that "the general message that we get from the video is that if you want people to like you, shorten the length of your clothes, plump up your hair, wear more makeup, and embarrass other people". The group then addressed the negative response on the video, saying "People are saying how it's a bad message, but really, it's a great message because what we're trying to say is with a little bit of confidence, that's all you need, and that's all we ever try to say in the video". The video peaked at number 3 on the Billboard Twitter Top Tracks on 27 June 2015.

== Live performances ==
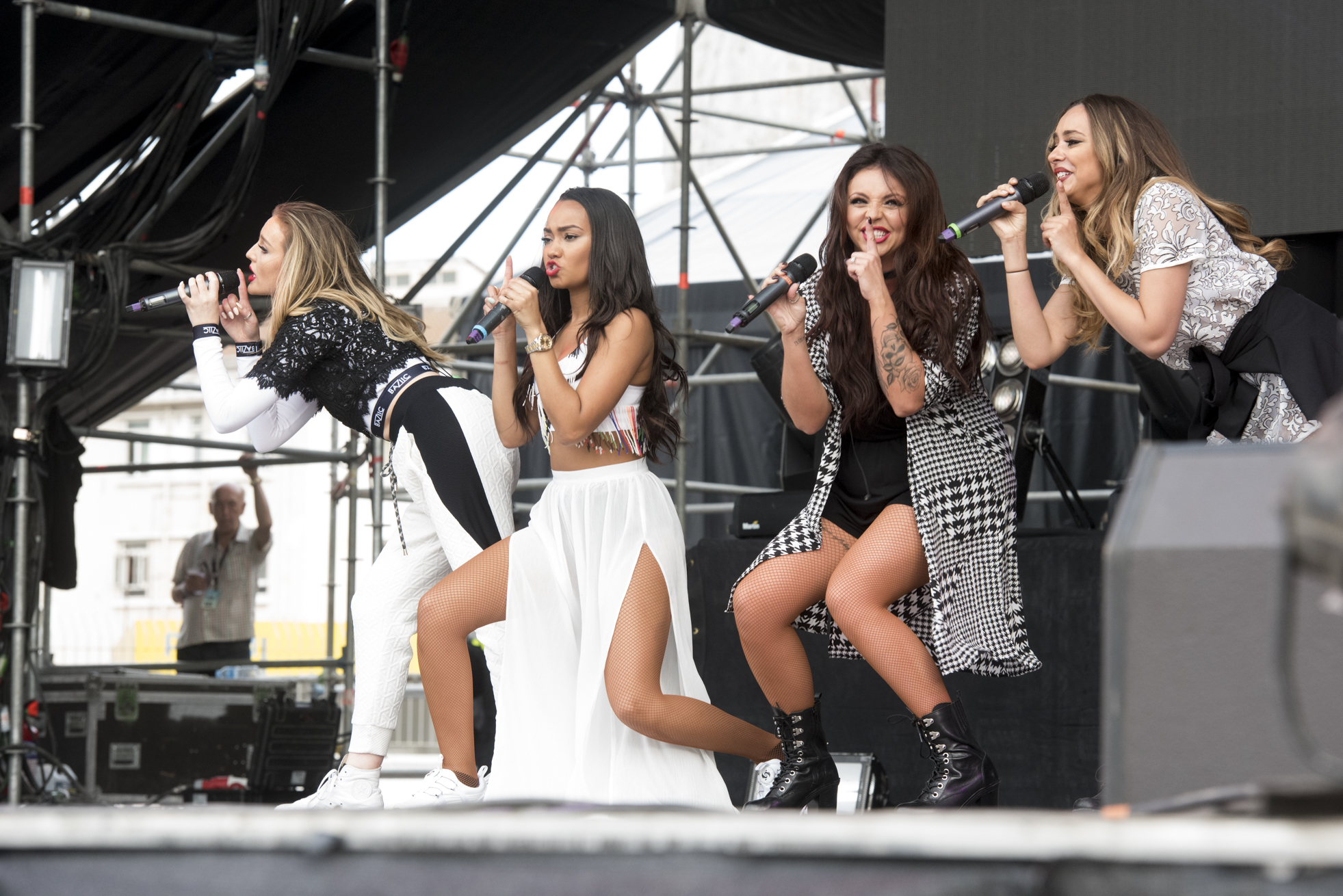
Little Mix performing at the Gibraltar Music Festival on 5 September 2015.

Little Mix performed "Black Magic" for the first time at Capital's Summertime Ball in Wembley Stadium on 6 June 2015. On 5 June 2015, the group announced the Black Magic Radio Tour, during which they would promote the song and their new music on several radio stations; the tour started on 8 June 2015 and ended on 12 June 2015. The radio tour included eighteen appearances in stations around the United Kingdom. On 14 June 2015, they performed the song on the British radio show Total Access, hosted by Elliot Holman. They also performed acoustic performances of the song for biannual magazine Hunger on 22 June 2015 and for the British music channel 4Music on 3 July 2015. On 13 July 2015, Little Mix performed the song on ITV's This Morning while on 16 July 2015, the song was performed on the thirteenth episode of CBBC's Friday Download ninth season. The group performed the song during Radio City's Summer Live in the Echo Arena alongside singers such as Rita Ora, Alesha Dixon and Nick Jonas. On 30 July 2015, Little Mix performed "Black Magic" in Plymouth during the first day of MTV Crashes Plymouth. The group performed the song in BBC Radio 1 Live Lounge before performing a mashup cover of Jason Derulo's "Want to Want Me" and Whitney Houston's "I Wanna Dance with Somebody" with a gospel choir. They also performed the song during the "Kiss Secret Sessions" for the Kiss music channel on 30 July 2015. The group appeared on the light entertainment television show Surprise Surprise to perform the song and also surprise one of their fans. On 5 September 2015, Little Mix performed the song at the Gibraltar Music Festival. Little Mix opened the Apple Music Festival in London for One Direction and performed "Black Magic" among other songs. The group performed "Black Magic" during the two concerts of the 2015 Jingle Bell Ball on 5 and 6 December 2015.

In the United States, they performed the song during The 1989 World Tour with Taylor Swift at Levi's Stadium on 15 August 2015. They also performed at the 2015 Teen Choice Awards a day later. On 17 August 2015, they performed the song on The Late Late Show with James Corden and also on The Today Show two days later. During their performance on the tenth season of America's Got Talent, the group teamed up with season nine third-placed gymnastics group AcroArmy to perform the song. On 22 August 2015, the group performed the song during the Billboard Hot 100 Music Festival. In Denmark, the group performed "Black Magic" in Tivoli Gardens for The Voice '15, the annual concert by The Voice radio station and also on the morning show Go' Morgen Danmark. In Sweden, the song was performed on TV4's Sommarkrysset, and later on the Swedish version of Idol during the "Boy groups vs Girl groups" week. In the Netherlands, the group performed the song during a fan event in Utrecht. The song has been performed on The Get Weird Tour, which supported the parent album of the song, and the LM5: The Tour.

== Cover versions ==
English singer Jess Glynne, who also worked with the group on their Get Weird album, covered the song on Capital FM as a part of Capital Live Sessions. It was released on Capital's YouTube channel on 6 September 2015. English boy band Concept covered the song and added a rap part. Welsh singer-songwriter Greta Isaac, accompanied by her sisters, performed the song for Terry Wogan on BBC Radio 2 live in session on 9 August 2015.

== Formats and track listings ==
Digital download
No.	Title	Length
1.	"Black Magic"	3:32

Remixes
No.	Title	Length
1.	"Black Magic" (LuvBug Remix)	4:01
2.	"Black Magic" (Cahill Remix)	3:17
3.	"Black Magic" (Acoustic)	3:27

German CD single
No.	Title	Length
1.	"Black Magic"	3:32
2.	"Black Magic" (LuvBug Remix)	4:01
3.	"Black Magic" (Cahill Remix)	3:27
4.	"Black Magic" (Acoustic)	3:27

Japanese CD single
No.	Title	Length
1.	"Black Magic"	3:32
2.	"Black Magic" (LuvBug Remix)	4:01
3.	"Black Magic" (Cahill Remix)	3:27
4.	"Black Magic" (Acoustic)	3:27
5.	"Black Magic" (Official Video)
6.	"Black Magic" (Behind The Scenes Pt. 1)
7.	"Black Magic" (Behind The Scenes Pt. 2)
8.	"Painting Challenge"
9.	"How Well Do We Know Each Other Challenge"
10.	"Japanese Test Challenge"

== Personnel and credits ==
Credits adapted from Tidal and the CD single of Get Weird.

Personnel

- Little Mix – lead vocals
- Electric – songwriting, production, engineering, instruments, programming
- Sam Elison – production
- Ed Drewett – songwriting
- Henrik Michelsen – songwriting, programming
- Edvard Erfjord – songwriting, programming
- Camille Purcell – songwriting, background vocals
- Maegan Cottone – vocal production
- Matt Rad – additional producer
- Serban Ghenea – mixing
- Tom Coyne – mastering
- Randy Merrill – mastering
- Chris Bishop – engineering
- John Hanes – engineering
- Dick Beetham – mastering

Recording

- Mixed at MixStar Studios, Virginia Beach, VA
- Recorded at Tileyard Studios, London, England
- Vocals recorded at Blue Bar Studios, London, England

== Accolades ==
"Black Magic" has received a total of two awards and 7 nominations. The song won the 2015 Popjustice £20 Music Prize for Track of the Year, and Best Song of the Teens at the 2018 Now! 100 Music Awards. At the 2015 Teen Choice Awards, the song was nominated for the Choice Music: Love Song category. It also received two nominations at the 2016 Brit Awards, in the categories British Single of the Year and British Video of The Year.

List of awards and nominations for "Black Magic"
Year	Award ceremony	Category	Result	Ref.
2015	BBC Radio 1 Teen Awards	Best British Single	Nominated	
2015	Popjustice £20 Music Prize	Track of the Year	Won	
2015	Teen Choice Awards	Choice Music: Love Song	Nominated	
2016	2016 Brit Awards	British Single of the Year	Nominated	
2016	2016 Brit Awards	British Video of the Year	Nominated	
2018	NOW 100 Music Awards	Song of the Now Years	Nominated	
2018	NOW 100 Music Awards	Best Song of the Teens	Won	

== Charts ==
=== Weekly charts ===
Weekly chart performance for "Black Magic"
Chart (2015)	Peak position
Australia Digital Song Sales (Billboard)	8
Australia (ARIA)	8
Austria (Ö3 Austria Top 40)	73
Belgium (Ultratip Bubbling Under Flanders)	4
Belgium (Ultratip Bubbling Under Wallonia)	37
Canada Hot 100 (Billboard)	52
Canada CHR/Top 40 (Billboard)	34
CIS Airplay (TopHit)	191
Czech Republic Singles Digital (ČNS IFPI)	29
Euro Digital Song Sales (Billboard)	1
France (SNEP)	155
Hungary (Stream Top 40)	40
Ireland (IRMA)	3
Israel (Media Forest TV Airplay)	5
Italy (FIMI)	86
Japan Hot 100 (Billboard)	47
Mexico Airplay (Billboard)	40
Mexico Ingles Airplay (Billboard)	13
Netherlands (Single Top 100)	82
Scottish Singles Sales (Official Charts)	1
New Zealand (Recorded Music NZ)	31
Slovakia Singles Digital (ČNS IFPI)	31
Slovenia (SloTop50)	47
Sweden (Sverigetopplistan)	58
UK Singles (Official Charts)	1
US Billboard Hot 100	67
US Pop Airplay (Billboard)	24

=== Year-end charts ===
Year-end chart performance for "Black Magic"
Chart (2015)	Position
Australia (ARIA)	60
UK Singles (Official Charts Company)	27

== Certifications ==
Certifications and sales for "Black Magic"
Region	Certification	Certified units/sales
Australia (ARIA)	2× Platinum	140,000^{‡}
Brazil (Pro-Música Brasil)	Diamond	250,000^{‡}
Canada (Music Canada)	Platinum	80,000^{‡}
Denmark (IFPI Danmark)	Platinum	90,000^{‡}
Italy (FIMI)	Gold	25,000^{‡}
Mexico (AMPROFON)	Platinum	60,000^{‡}
New Zealand (RMNZ)	3× Platinum	90,000^{‡}
Poland (ZPAV)	Platinum	20,000^{‡}
Sweden (GLF)	Gold	20,000^{‡}
United Kingdom (BPI)	4× Platinum	2,400,000
United States (RIAA)	Gold	500,000^{‡}
^{*} Sales figures based on certification alone.^{‡} Sales+streaming figures based on certification alone.

== Release history ==
Release dates and formats for "Black Magic"
Region	Date	Format	Label
United States	19 May 2015	Digital download	Syco
United Kingdom	21 May 2015	Radio airplay	Syco
United States	21 May 2015	Digital download	Syco; Columbia
Australia	22 May 2015	Digital download	Sony
Ireland	10 July 2015	Digital download	Syco
United Kingdom	10 July 2015	Digital download	Syco
United States	14 July 2015	Mainstream radio	Syco; Columbia
