= Love Me Like You =

2015 single by Little Mix

Single by Little Mix

from the album Get Weird
- B-side: "Lightning"
- Released: 25 September 2015
- Recorded: 2014
- Studio: Rokstone Studios
- Genre: Pop; doo-wop
- Length: 3:17
- Label: Columbia; Syco
- Songwriters: Steve Mac; Iain James; Camille Purcell; James Newman
- Producer: Steve Mac

Little Mix singles chronology
"Black Magic" (2015)	"Love Me Like You" (2015)	"Secret Love Song" (2016)

Music video
- "Love Me Like You" on YouTube

"Love Me Like You" is a song by British girl group Little Mix. It was released through Syco Music and Columbia Records, as the second single from the group's third studio album, Get Weird (2015). It was produced by Steve Mac, who co-wrote the song with Iain James, Camille Purcell and James Newman. A Christmas version was later released, titled "Love Me Like You (Christmas Mix)".

"Love Me Like You" is a pop song with a down-tempo retro homage to doo-wop, with lyrics about puppy love. The song received positive reviews from critics who praised its vintage style and highlighted it as an album standout. It charted at number eleven on the UK Singles Chart and charted in eight other countries including Australia, Ireland, and Japan. The song was performed by the group at the Royal Variety in 2015. The song received renewed attention in 2022 and 2024 after becoming viral on the video-sharing social platform, TikTok.

== Background and release ==
"Love Me Like You" was written by Steve Mac, Camille Purcell, Iain James and James Newman for Little Mix's third studio album, Get Weird (2015). It was published by Rokstone Music Ltd. under exclusive licence to BMG Rights Management (UK) Ltd; Kobalt Music Group; Sony/ATV Music Publishing; Black Butter Music Publishing and BMG Rights Management. The song was produced by Mac and mixed by Serban Ghenea at Mixstar Studios in Virginia Beach, Virginia. It was engineered for mixing by John Hanes and engineered by Chris Laws and Dann Pursey, and mastered by Tom Coyne and Randy Merrill at Sterling Sound Studios in New York. The track was recorded at Rokstone Studios in London. Purcell also provided background vocals. The keyboards were performed by Mac, and the guitars were played by Paul Gendler. Laws and Pursey performed the drums and the percussion, respectively.

The group announced on 9 September 2015 that "Love Me Like You" would be the second single to be released from the album, and that it would be made available to pre-order on 11 September, and be released on 25 September. It was released by Syco and Columbia in Ireland and the United Kingdom on 25 September 2015. The single's artwork was released on the same day. In their review, MTV News joked that the group were suggesting that it would be number-one due to each of the band members eyeline, writing "We can't help but get the hint they're on the hunt for ANOTHER chart topping trophy. Leigh-Anne clearly thinks she can see it in the distance, Jesy is just imagining it with her brain, Jade definitely thinks she can hear the noise of records being sold and Perrie is convinced it's on the floor." M magazine writer Heather Thompson described the artwork as "vibrant". A collection of alternate versions called "Love Me Like You (The Collection)" was also released in Australia and New Zealand in addition to Ireland and the United Kingdom on 16 October 2015. It consists of a Christmas mix, several remixes and an instrumental version of "Love Me Like You", an exclusive interview and another album track called "Lightning".

== Composition ==
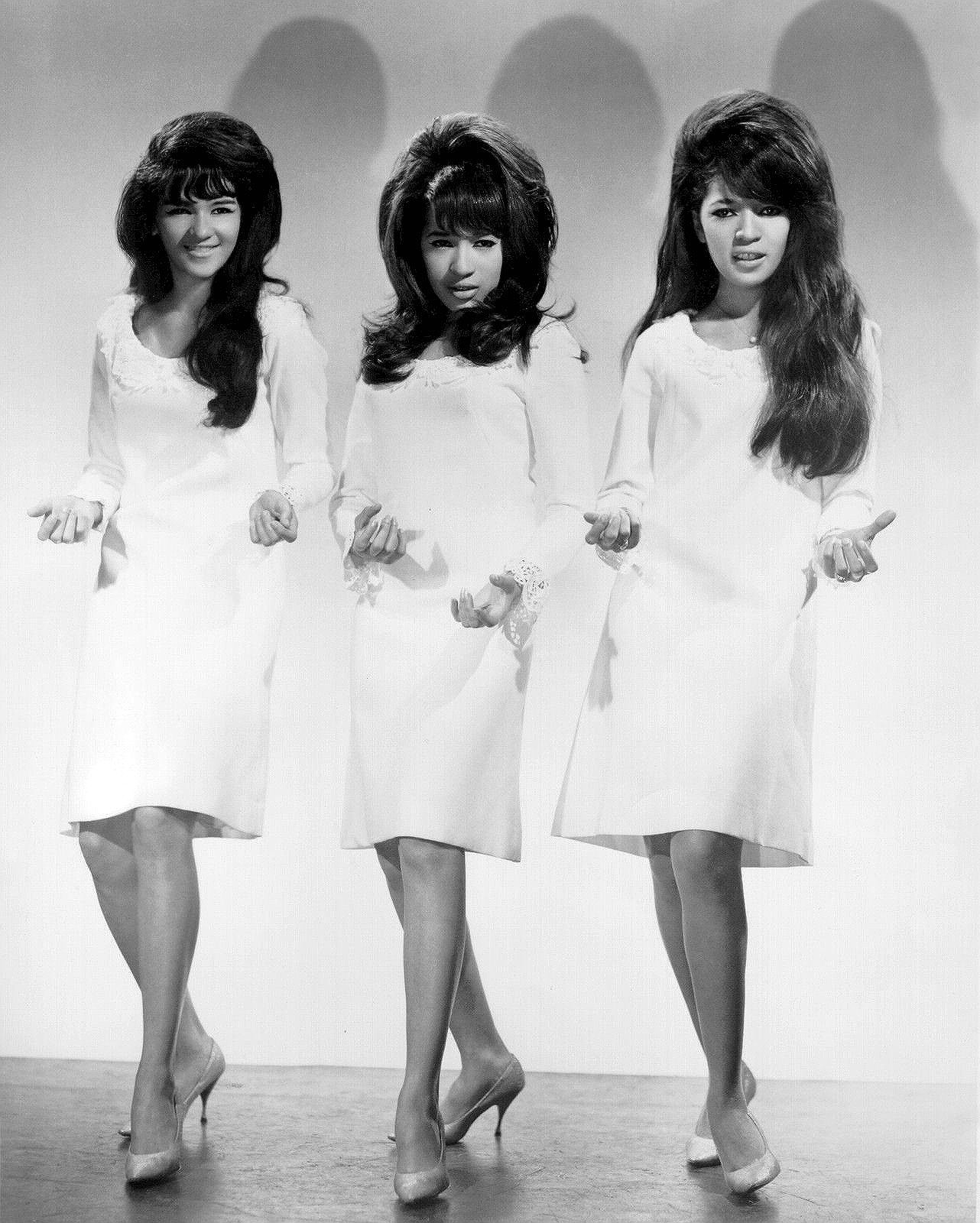
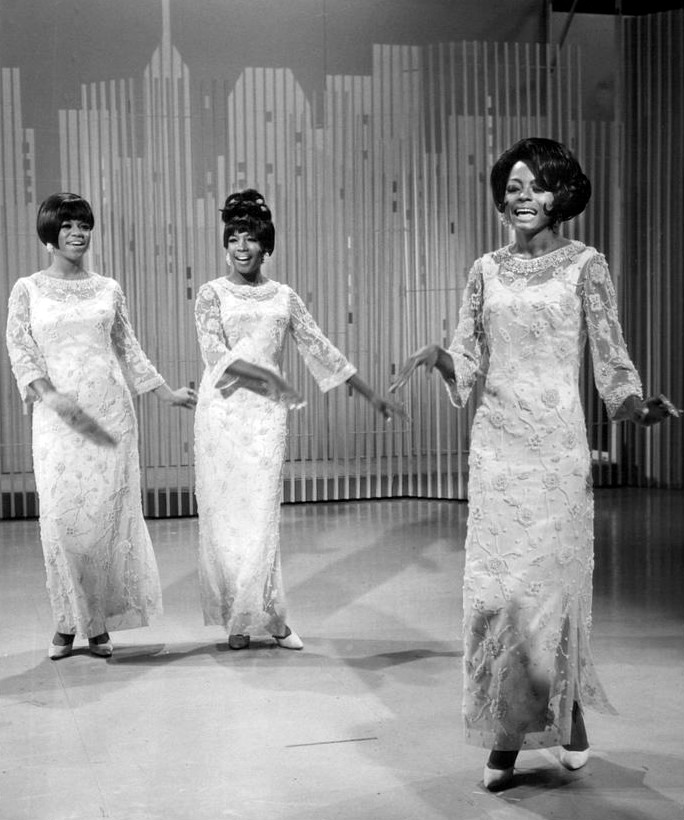
"Love Me Like You" was likened to the material recorded by The Ronettes (left) and The Supremes (right) for its retro doo-wop style.

"Love Me Like You" has been described as a down-tempo "ode to '60s doo-wop" retro style pop song, which lasts for a duration of three minutes, seventeen seconds. The song is composed in the key of G major using common time and a tempo of 106 beats per minute. Instrumentation is provided by "vintage" pianos, bells and a "pumping" tenor sax. The use of percussion gives the a track a more modern style. During the track, the band members vocal range spans one octave, from the low note of D_{4} to the high note of E_{5}.

The song opens with the group harmonising "Sha la la la" over pianos. The lyrics are about puppy love, as they yearningly sing "Last night I lay in bed so blue / Cause' I realized the truth/ They can't love me like you / I tried to find somebody new / Baby they ain't got a clue/ Can't love me like you." Fuse writer Jeff Benjamin described the song as being reminiscent of 1960s girl group The Ronettes but with a more modern feel for 2015 radio, highlighting the line "They try to romance me but you got that nasty and that's what I want" as an example. Digital Spy writer Lewis Corner thought that the line "He might got the biggest ca-aa-ar" does not fool listeners into thinking that "they're not actually talking about his Fiat 500." Several music critics compared the song to recordings from the Motown era in the 1950s and 1960s, with Andy Gill of The Independent likening it to material composed by Shadow Morton. Emilee Lindner of MTV News likened the production to material composed by Phil Spector. The Christmas mix version features added church bells and jingles.

== Critical reception ==
Andy Gill of The Independent described the track as having a "nice" retro sound, and singled it out as being one of his top three songs from the album to download, along with "Black Magic" and "Grown". Writing for NME, Nick Levine thought that "Love Me Like You" was reminiscent of songs recorded by Stooshe, but added that Little Mix performed the Motown style "without the forced sense of fun." Similarly, Billboard writer Malorie MaCall and Digital Spy critic Jack Klompus likened the retro style to songs performed by Meghan Trainor and The Supremes, respectively. Music Times writer Carolyn Menyes praised its composition for being "charming" and described the track as "totally charming." A reviewer for Press Play OK commented that the song was "less club night and more prom night." Broadcaster Stephen Fry criticised the track when interviewed by Newsbeat about his review of a selection of songs released in 2015. He described it as "horrible" and a modern-day "hideous, toxic compound" take on a Phil Spector song.

Joe from Attitude wrote "The modern do-wop sound doesn’t always land, but this takes the vintage sound of The Ronettes, complementing 60s sound, whilst giving it a modern edge with those filthy innuendos. To think this was originally called ‘F**k me like you".

== Chart performance ==
In the United Kingdom, "Love Me Like You" debuted at number 21 on the UK Singles Chart on 8 October 2015. It later peaked at number 11 on 7 January 2016. It also peaked at number nine on the UK Singles Downloads Chart. The track has been certified platinum by the British Phonographic Industry (BPI) for 600,000 combined sales and streaming units. In Scotland, the song reached number five. It achieved success in Ireland, reaching number 8 on 31 December 2015. It peaked at number 66 on the Belgium Ultratip Flanders chart on 31 October 2015. It also peaked at number 64 in Slovakia, number 81 in the Czech Republic, and number 140 in France. Outside of Europe, "Love Me Like You" reached number 80 on the Japan Hot 100, number 27 in Australia, and number one on the New Zealand Heatseekers chart.

== Music video ==
The accompanying music video for "Love Me Like You" was released on 10 October 2015. The video takes place at a school dance, where a professor in the hall (the same man who appeared in their previous single's video "Black Magic") tells everyone that it is the last dance. Jade, Leigh-Anne, Jesy and Perrie are waiting for their dates to arrive. Scenes of the girls waiting for their date are intercut throughout the video of them sitting at a table while all of the other couples are dancing. Unbeknownst to them, the man (played by Power Rangers Samurai's Hector David Junior) has invited each of them to go to the dance after meeting them in different situations prior to that night.

He asked Jade by picking her up in his car to go on a date. As she gets in, he invites her to be his date at the dance and presents her with a corsage to wear on her wrist on the night. He meets Leigh-Anne at a high school basketball game, where she and her girlfriends were watching him and some other boys play on the court. He sees that she is infatuated by how good he is at the sport, walks up to her, and asks her to be his date by giving her a corsage. He asked Jesy to be his date while they were at the cinema as they shared a bucket of popcorn. As he gives her the corsage, she throws the bucket over her shoulder and eagerly jumps on his lap, causing them to fall off the chair. Finally, he invited Perrie to be his date after she fell off her bike while staring at him work out on a field and pouring water over his torso to cool down. He helps her up, and gives her a corsage. Toward the end of the video, they sit on a bench next to the entrance, and see their date walk in with another girl wearing the same corsage as the ones that he had given each of them. They realise that he has two-timed all of them and they are all dateless. It ends with the girls being each other's date and solemnly dancing whilst everyone else has a good time.

Metro writer Rebecca Lewis noted that the man in the video strongly resembled Perrie's former fiancé Zayn Malik of One Direction. She also wrote that fans had noticed that she was still wearing her engagement ring in the video, meaning that the video was filmed before they split up in August 2015.

== Live performances ==
Little Mix performed "Love Me Like You" live on the seventh season of The X Factor in Australia on 13 October 2015. Capital praised their performance, writing that it set an "amazing example" for the contestants on the show and that their vocals were "pitch perfect". On 1 November, the group performed a "Love Me Like You"/"Black Magic" medley on the twelfth series of The X Factor in the United Kingdom. Little Mix sang the track live on Good Morning America in the United States on 5 November. They returned to the UK to perform "Love Me Like You" at the Radio 1 Teen Awards at Wembley Arena on 8 November, and again the following morning on breakfast show Lorraine. "Love Me Like You" was included on the set-list of their segment at Capital's annual Jingle Bell Ball on 6 December, along with the other singles to be released Get Weird "Black Magic" and "Secret Love Song", as well as previous singles "Salute", "Move" and "Wings".

== Track listing ==
Digital download

1. "Love Me Like You" – 3:17

Digital download — The Collection

1. "Love Me Like You" (Christmas Mix) – 3:29
2. "Lightning" – 5:09
3. "Love Me Like You" (J-Vibe Reggae Remix) – 3:04
4. "Love Me Like You" (Bimbo Jones Remix) – 3:07
5. "Love Me Like You" (7th Heaven Remix) – 3:10
6. "Love Me Like You" (Exclusive Interview) – 3:16
7. "Love Me Like You" (Instrumental) – 3:15

== Charts ==
Chart (2015–2016)	Peak position
Australia (ARIA)	27
Belgium (Ultratip Flanders)	66
Czech Republic (Singles Digitál Top 100)	81
Euro Digital Songs (Billboard)	14
France (SNEP)	140
Ireland (IRMA)	8
Japan (Japan Hot 100)	80
New Zealand Heatseekers (RMNZ)	1
Scotland (Official Charts Company)	5
Slovakia (Singles Digitál Top 100)	64
UK Singles (Official Charts Company)	11

== Certifications ==
Region	Certification	Certified units/sales
Brazil (Pro-Música Brasil)	Platinum	60,000^{‡}
New Zealand (RMNZ)	Platinum	30,000^{‡}
Poland (ZPAV) Christmas Mix	Gold	25,000^{‡}
United Kingdom (BPI)	Platinum	811,000
^{‡} Sales+streaming figures based on certification alone.
