= Steve James (DJ) =

American DJ

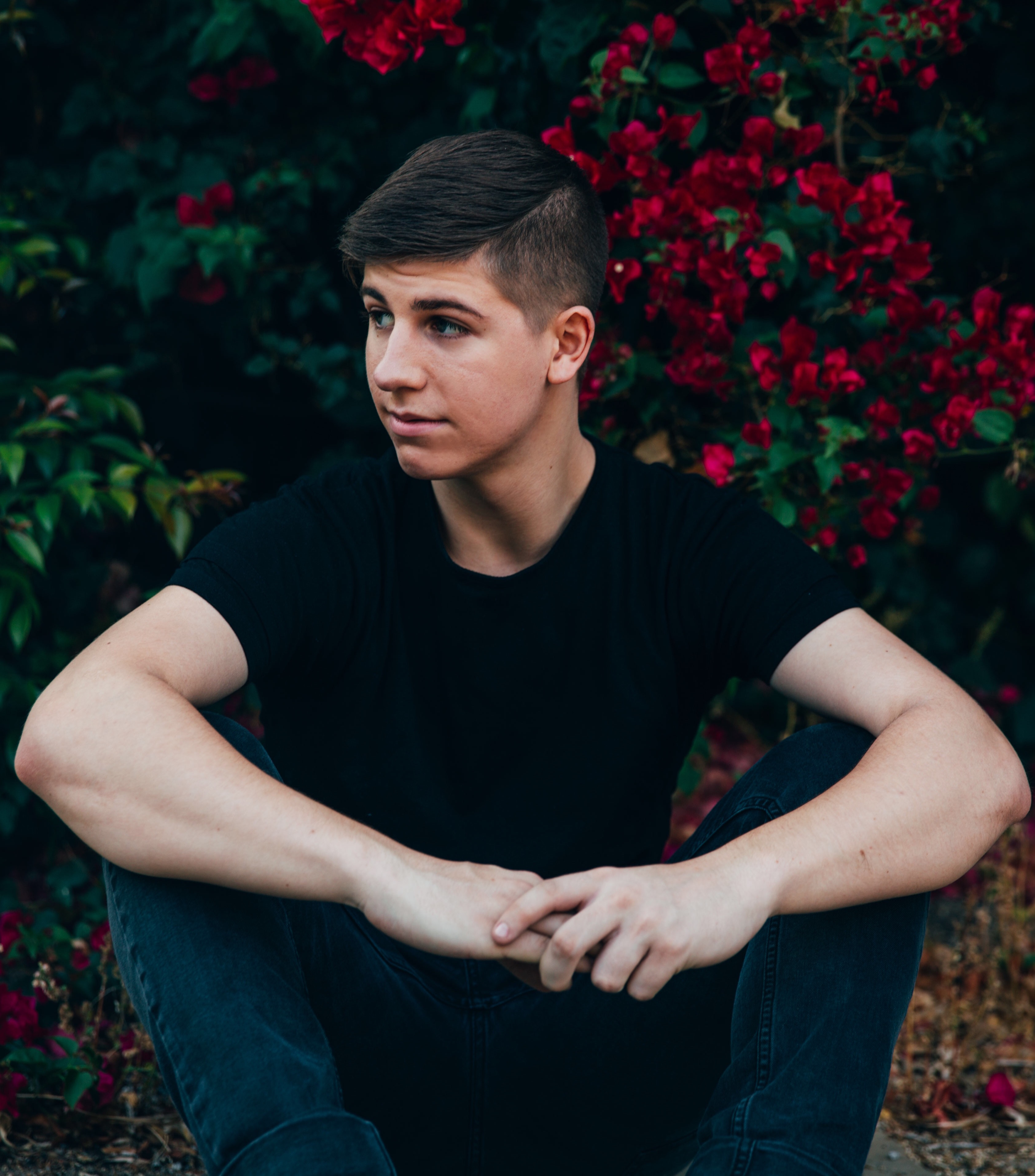
- Steve James in 2015

Background information
- Born: Stephen James Philibin; April 11, 1998 (age 27)
- Origin: Johnstown, Pennsylvania, United States
- Genres: Electronic, pop
- Years active: 2014–present
- Website: www.stevejamesofficial.com

Stephen James Philibin (born April 11, 1998), better known by his stage name Steve James, is an American record producer, songwriter and DJ.

== Career ==
Steve James was born in Johnstown, Pennsylvania. He began learning the piano at the age of four, classically trained. He was introduced to progressive house music by his brother and was inspired to pursue electronic music production after seeing Avicii live, at the age of 14. James began experimenting with Ableton at age 15 and found early success with his remix of ZHU's "Faded," which was the top remix of 2014 on Sirius XM's BPM Station.

In the summer of 2015, James took a trip to Los Angeles, California and was introduced to Jason Boyd (Poo Bear). Upon their first meeting, James played Poo Bear an instrumental idea on the piano, which lead to them co-writing and co-producing the title track on Justin Bieber's fourth studio album, 'Purpose. The album has since gone 3× Platinum in the US (RIAA) and 4× Platinum in Canada.

Following the release of "Purpose", James left Richland High School, passed the GED test, and returned to LA to pursue music full-time. In November 2015, James released his debut single, "Renaissance", on Seeking Blue and briefly supported the Chainsmokers on their Friendzone tour.

After meeting Martin Garrix in early 2016, James and Garrix collaborated on "In the Name of Love". In March 2016, James snuck into Ultra Music Festival 2016 to watch Garrix premiere the song, as millions streamed the performance live. "In the Name of Love" has since charted in over 30 countries.

James' premiered his second single, "In My Head" in July 2016, on Martin Garrix's 1st episode of STMPD Radio with Zane Lowe. Throughout the rest of 2016, James supported Garrix, Matoma, and Vanic on their worldwide tours. James has since been seen working in the studio with Martin Garrix, Oliver Heldens, Morgan Page, Matthew Koma, and Lights, among others.

== Discography ==
=== Singles ===
Year	Title
"Renaissance" (with Clairity)	2015
"In My Head" (featuring RKCB)	2016
"Candles (with Morgan Page)"	2017
"Warrior" (featuring Lights)	2017
"Fall for You"	2019
"Missing You" (with Eric Nam)	2019
"Bonfire" (with Galantis)	2020
"Like I Do" (with Morgan Page featuring Brooke Tomlinson)	2021

=== Songwriting and production ===
Year	Title	Artist	Credit
2015	"Purpose"	Justin Bieber	Producer and Writer
2016	"In the Name of Love"	Martin Garrix and Bebe Rexha	Producer and Writer
2016	"Power"	Little Mix featuring Stormzy	Producer
2017	"Middle of the Night"	The Vamps and Martin Jensen	Producer and Writer
2017	"Morphine"	Lights	Producer and Writer
2017	"Suitcase"	Matthew Koma	Producer

=== Remixes ===
Year	Title	Artist
2014	"Rather Be"	Clean Bandit featuring Jess Glynne
2014	"Ready For Love"	Felix Cartal featuring Chloe Angelides
2014	"All of Me"	John Legend
2014	"Reverse"	SomeKindaWonderful
2014	"Beating Heart"	Ellie Goulding
2014	"Take Me Home"	Cash Cash featuring Bebe Rexha
2014	"Stay"	tyDi featuring Dia Frampton
2014	"Faded"	ZHU
2015	"All We Do"	Oh Wonder
2015	"Karaoke"	Smallpools
2015	"I Want You To Know"	Zedd featuring Selena Gomez
2015	"Earned It"	The Weeknd
2015	"Let You Go"	The Chainsmokers featuring Great Good Fine OK
2015	"Soap"	Melanie Martinez
2016	"Remind Me"	Conrad Sewell
2016	"Friend"	FRND
2016	"Kisses Back"	Matthew Koma
2016	"In My Head"	Steve James and Joe Mason
2017	"Flame"	Tinashe
2020	"Raising Hell"	Kesha
