= Get Weird =

- Standard edition cover

Studio album by Little Mix
- Released: 6 November 2015
- Recorded: September–October 2014
- Studios: Tileyard, London, England
- Genres: Synth-pop; dance-pop; R&B
- Length: 42:17
- Languages: English; Japanese
- Labels: Syco; Columbia
- Producers: Electric; TMS; Jayson DeZuzio; Nick Monson; TroyBoi; Kiris Houston; Jez Ashurst; Camille Purcell; Joe Kearns; Nathan Duvall; Phil Cook; Steve Mac; Matt Rad

Little Mix chronology
Salute (2013)	Get Weird (2015)	Glory Days (2016)

Singles from Get Weird
- 1. "Black Magic" Released: 21 May 2015; 2. "Love Me Like You" Released: 25 September 2015; 3. "Secret Love Song" Released: 3 February 2016; 4. "Hair" Released: 15 April 2016

Get Weird is the third studio album by British girl group Little Mix, released on 6 November 2015 through Syco Music and Columbia Records. It was supported by four singles: the UK number-one single "Black Magic", "Love Me Like You", "Secret Love Song" featuring American singer Jason Derulo, and "Hair" featuring Jamaican singer Sean Paul. A deluxe edition was released on the same day and features four additional tracks, while the Japanese edition of the album includes a collaboration with Japanese girl group Flower.

Musically, Get Weird retains the group's previous pop and R&B sound of their first two albums while incorporating elements of synth pop, dance pop, rock, teen pop, 1980s and 1990s sounds. Get Weird was met with generally positive reviews from critics, with Rolling Stone listing it as one of the best pop albums of 2015. Its subject matter sees Little Mix approach more mature themes with lyrics that address a variety of topics including feminism, self love, sexual relationships, breakups, friendships, and independence.

The album debuted and peaked at number two on the UK Albums Chart, and broke the record for the longest-charting girl group album in the country. In 2019, it was listed as the eleventh biggest girl group album between 1994 and 2019. It peaked at number one in Ireland, and reached the top ten in New Zealand, Netherlands and Australia. It also reached number thirteen in the United States, making Little Mix the first girl group from the UK to have their first three albums debut within the top fifteen of the Billboard 200. It has received one triple platinum, two platinum and three gold music certifications.

== Background ==
In 2014, Little Mix were promoting their second studio album Salute, and embarked on their second headlining concert tour, entitled The Salute Tour, between May and July. An extension of the tour visiting North America was scheduled for September and October, but these dates were cancelled due to the process of recording their next album. In 2021, the group revealed that they had already recorded enough tracks for a full-length album in 2014 but scrapped all but two or three songs, believing that the quality of the material was not good enough for a release. They had put pressure on themselves to make a great third album but believed that their decision to scrap the original sessions could lead to them getting dropped by their label, Syco.

At the 2015 Brit Awards, Little Mix confirmed that their third album was completed, describing it as having a "whole new sound" and projecting the release for sometime in 2015. In May 2015, having written over 100 songs for their third album, they released "Black Magic", the lead single from their third album. They also co-wrote Britney Spears and Iggy Azalea's single "Pretty Girls", which was released in May 2015. The group stated that the album had more of a pop sound than their previous album Salute, an R&B-style album, with the songs being very fun, colourful and personality driven.

On 15 July 2015, the group officially announced on Twitter that their third studio album would be titled Get Weird, and would be available for pre-order the next day. According to Jade Thirlwall, the title was chosen because the girls wanted the album to "bring out the inner weirdness in everyone". Shortly before the album's release, it was revealed that they were forced to change some of the lyrical content on some of their songs, namely "Love Me Like You" and "A.D.I.D.A.S.", both of which contain sexual themes.

== Singles ==
In February 2015, Little Mix revealed that they had chosen the lead single from Get Weird. On 14 May 2015, they announced the song's name was "Black Magic", after the single's cover art surfaced on music identification service Shazam. "Black Magic" was scheduled to premiere on 26 May but was later moved forward to 21 May, after the single leaked online on 20 May. The single was released digitally in the UK on 10 July 2015, and was number 1 on the UK charts for three weeks.

On 25 September 2015, the group released "Love Me Like You" as the second single from the album. An official music video followed. On 5 December 2015, it was announced that "Secret Love Song" would be released as the third single from the album in the UK and Ireland. It was sent to UK radio on 7 December 2015. On 11 April 2016, the group announced that "Hair" would serve as the fourth single from Get Weird, and would feature newly recorded guest vocals from reggae pop recording artist Sean Paul. The single was released on 15 April 2016.

=== Promotional singles ===
Three promotional singles were released from Get Weird. "Hair" was released as the album's first promotional single on 28 August 2015. The song charted at number 35 in the UK, and reached the charts in Ireland, Australia, and France. "Weird People" was released on 16 October 2015. It reached number 78 in the UK and reached the charts in Australia. On 30 October 2015, "Grown" was released as the album's third and final promotional single. The song charted at number 72 on the UK Singles Chart.

Other songs from the album that have been certified in the UK by the British Phonographic Industry (BPI) are "Secret Love Song Pt. II", which has been certified silver, and "Love Me or Leave Me", which has been certified gold. The latter song has also been certified gold in Denmark and featured on the soundtrack of the film After We Collided in 2020.

== Promotion ==
Little Mix performed "Black Magic" at Capital's Summertime Ball in Wembley Stadium on 6 June 2015. They performed the song on the eighteenth series of wish-granting television show Surprise Surprise. The group performed "Black Magic" at the 2015 Teen Choice Awards on 16 August 2015. They also performed acoustic versions of the single.

=== Tour ===
The Get Weird Tour was officially announced on 17 July 2015 through the band's Twitter. It began on 13 March 2016 in Cardiff, Wales at the Motorpoint Arena and continued throughout the UK, Asia, Australia and Europe, concluding with a rearranged gig in Belfast on 2 July. The UK gigs were extended from 31 March, and the gig in Cologne was moved to the Palladium from the Live Music Hall, both due to demand. On 13 October 2015, it was announced that the tour would also include dates in Australia, making it Little Mix's first headline tour outside of the UK and Ireland. The tour grossed $22.1 million and as of January 2018 was the eighth-highest-grossing tour by a girl group.

== Critical reception ==
Professional ratings
Aggregate scores
Source	Rating
AnyDecentMusic?	6.3/10
Metacritic	66/100
Review scores
Source	Rating
AllMusic	3.5/5 stars
Digital Spy	4/5 stars
Entertainment Weekly	B−
Financial Times	3/5 stars
God is in the TV	3.5/5 stars
The Guardian	3/5 stars
The Independent	3/5 stars
The Music	3/5 stars
NME	3/5 stars

Get Weird received generally positive reviews from music critics. At Metacritic, which assigns a normalized rating out of 100 to reviews from mainstream critics, the album received an average score of 66, which indicates "generally favourable reviews", based on 5 reviews. AllMusic described the album as "ear-poppingly catchy" and said, "There's a kinetic energy to many of the tracks on Get Weird that brings to mind the arty '80s dance-pop of bands like Yello crossed with the crisp, bluesy soulfulness of Robert Palmer", and concluded that "ultimately, Little Mix's stylish, decade-blending synergy works, and Get Weird ends up being a lot of fun".

NME noted that "the group's personality and powerhouse vocals light up Get Weird, a hook-filled and witty collection of unapologetic pop. With the exception of a moody trap ballad called 'Lightning', this consistently impressive third album is never as inventive as, say, Girls Aloud in their pomp, but its tune count isn't far behind... It might not be that weird, but by this point, you'd be forgiven for thinking that Little Mix are cooler than you gave them credit for." The Guardian stated that Little Mix "spend much of their third album skipping through the cute corridors of 90s tween pop rather than angling for austere adulthood" which the reviewer found to be initially disappointing, but concluding that "business is largely buoyant". The Independent had mixed feelings, saying "there are lots of little things to like about Little Mix's third album... balanced, of course, by plenty of irritations".

=== Accolades ===
Get Weird was ranked number 14 on Rolling Stone's list of the 20 Best Pop Albums of 2015, which described the album as Little Mix's "most consistently exciting and delightful album to date".

== Commercial performance ==
In the United Kingdom, Get Weird debuted at number two on the UK Albums Chart with sales of 60,053 in its first week. It was ranked at number eleven for the best-selling albums of 2015 in the UK, with sales of 389,000. In August 2016, the album was certified double platinum in the UK for shipping over 600,000 total units, and was the fifteenth-biggest selling album of 2016. In January 2018, it became the longest-charting album in the UK by a girl group, beating a previous record jointly held by Destiny's Child and the Spice Girls. As of March 2018, it was listed as the sixth-longest charting girl group album inside the top 40 of the UK Albums Chart, with a total of 55 weeks. In 2019, it was named as the eleventh-biggest girl group album between 1994 and 2019, and ranked at number 25 on the list of biggest albums by female artists between 2010 and 2019. Get Weird was ranked as the 70th biggest album of the 2010s in the United Kingdom.

The album reached number one in Ireland, becoming the group's first number-one in the country. It reached number two in Australia, and the top ten in Scotland, New Zealand, and Netherlands. It also reached the top twenty in ten other music markets including the United States, where it debuted at number 13 on the Billboard 200, with 21,853 copies sold in its debut week, becoming the ninth-best selling album of that week. It made Little Mix the only girl group from the UK to have their first three albums debut in the top fifteen of the Billboard 200.

Get Weird charted in seven other countries, and has been certified triple platinum in the United Kingdom, platinum in Brazil and Denmark, and gold in Mexico, Australia, and Singapore. By 2017, the album had sold over 1.5 million copies worldwide. In 2019, it surpassed one billion streams on Spotify.

== Track listing ==
Get Weird – Standard edition
No.	Title	Writer(s)	Producer(s)	Length
1.	"Black Magic"	Edvard Førre Erfjord; Henrik Michelsen; Camille Purcell; Ed Drewett	Electric; Matt Rad^{[a]}	3:31
2.	"Love Me Like You"	Steve Mac; Iain James; Purcell; James Newman	Mac	3:17
3.	"Weird People"	Erfjord; Michelsen; Purcell; Drewett	Electric; Rad^{[a]}	3:31
4.	"Secret Love Song" (featuring Jason Derulo)	Jez Ashurst; Emma Rohan; Rachel Furner; Jason Desrouleaux	Jayson DeZuzio	4:09
5.	"Hair"	Erfjord; Michelsen; Anita Blay; James; Purcell	Electric	3:29
6.	"Grown"	Erfjord; Michelsen; Jess Glynne; Janée "Jin Jin" Bennett; Purcell; Perrie Edwards; Jesy Nelson; Leigh-Anne Pinnock; Jade Thirlwall	Electric	2:36
7.	"I Love You"	TMS; Purcell; Edwards; Nelson; Pinnock; Thirlwall	TMS	4:09
8.	"OMG"	Nick Monson; Maegan Cottone; Mike Orabiyi; Jon Mills; Kurtis McKenzie; Edwards; Nelson; Pinnock; Thirlwall	Monson	3:23
9.	"Lightning"	TroyBoi; Cottone; Edwards; Nelson; Pinnock; Thirlwall	TroyBoi	5:12
10.	"A.D.I.D.A.S."	Cottone; Nathan Duvall; Kiris Houston; Pinnock; Thirlwall; Aubrey Graham; Noah Shebib; Majid Al Maskati; Jordan Ullman; Paul Jeffries	Duvall; Houston^{[a]}	3:22
11.	"Love Me or Leave Me"	Rad; Julia Michaels; Shane Stevens	Rad	3:26
12.	"The End"	Purcell	Joe Kearns; Purcell	2:12
Total length:				42:17

Get Weird – Deluxe edition (bonus tracks)
No.	Title	Writer(s)	Producer(s)	Length
13.	"I Won't"	TMS; Glynne; Edwards; Nelson; Pinnock; Thirlwall	TMS	3:17
14.	"Secret Love Song, Pt. II"	Ashurst; Rohan; Furner	Ashurst	4:26
15.	"Clued Up"	Edwards; Nelson; Pinnock; Thirlwall; Kohn; Barnes; Kelleher; Jessica Cornish	TMS	4:06
16.	"The Beginning"	Purcell	Purcell; Kearns	1:33
Total length:				55:39

Get Weird – Japanese edition (bonus tracks)
No.	Title	Writer(s)	Producer(s)	Length
17.	"Black Magic" (Acoustic)	Purcell; Erfjord; Michelsen; Drewett		3:29
18.	"Love Me like You" (Christmas Mix)	Purcell; Mac; James; Newman	Mac	3:30
19.	"Dreamin' Together" (Flower featuring Little Mix)	Kiyoshi Matsuo・Wada Masaya	Kiyoshi Matsu	4:56
Total length:				67:34

Get Weird – 2020 digital expanded edition (bonus tracks)
No.	Title	Writer(s)	Producer(s)	Length
17.	"Hair" (featuring Sean Paul)	Sean Paul Henriques; Erfjord; Michelsen; Blay; James; Purcell	Electric	3:55
18.	"Hair (Wideboys remix)" (featuring Sean Paul)	Henriques; Erfjord; Michelsen; Blay; James; Purcell	Electric	3:48

Notes

- ^{^a} signifies an additional producer.
- "A.D.I.D.A.S." contains elements from "Hold On, We're Going Home" by Drake.

== Charts ==
=== Weekly charts ===
Chart (2015)	Peak position
Australian Albums (ARIA)	2
Austrian Albums (Ö3 Austria)	16
Belgian Albums (Ultratop Flanders)	15
Belgian Albums (Ultratop Wallonia)	54
Canadian Albums (Billboard)	12
Croatian International Albums (HDU)	21
Czech Albums (ČNS IFPI)	34
Danish Albums (Hitlisten)	15
Dutch Albums (Album Top 100)	9
French Albums (SNEP)	47
German Albums (Offizielle Top 100)	29
Greek Albums (IFPI)	21
Irish Albums (IRMA)	1
Italian Albums (FIMI)	20
Japanese Albums (Oricon)	35
New Zealand Albums (RMNZ)	8
Norwegian Albums (VG-lista)	28
Portuguese Albums (AFP)	12
Scottish Albums (Official Charts)	2
Spanish Albums (Promusicae)	15
Swedish Albums (Sverigetopplistan)	13
Swiss Albums (Schweizer Hitparade)	18
South Korean International Albums (Circle)	14
UK Albums (Official Charts)	2
UK Album Downloads (Official Charts)	2
US Billboard 200	13

=== Year-end charts ===
Chart (2015)	Position
Irish Albums (IRMA)	15
UK Albums (OCC)	11
Chart (2016)	Position
Australian Albums (ARIA)	63
UK Albums (OCC)	15
Chart (2017)	Position
UK Albums (OCC)	85

=== Decade-end charts ===
Chart (2010–2019)	Position
UK Albums (OCC)	70

== Certifications ==
Certifications for Get Weird
Region	Certification	Certified units/sales
Australia (ARIA)	Gold	35,000^{^}
Brazil (Pro-Música Brasil)	Platinum	40,000^{‡}
Denmark (IFPI Danmark)	Platinum	20,000^{‡}
Mexico (AMPROFON)	Gold	30,000^{‡}
New Zealand (RMNZ)	2× Platinum	30,000^{‡}
Singapore (RIAS)	Gold	5,000^{*}
United Kingdom (BPI)	3× Platinum	950,000
United States	—	28,000
Summaries
Worldwide	—	1,500,000
^{*} Sales figures based on certification alone.^{^} Shipments figures based on certification alone.^{‡} Sales+streaming figures based on certification alone.

== Release history ==
List of release dates, showing region, formats, label, editions and reference
Region	Date	Format(s)	Label	Edition(s)	Ref.
United Kingdom	6 November 2015	CD; digital download	Syco	Standard edition; Deluxe edition	

== See also ==
- List of UK top-ten albums in 2015
- List of number-one albums of 2015 (Ireland)
