= My Ego Told Me To =

- Standard edition cover

Studio album by Leigh-Anne
- Released: 20 February 2026
- Genres: Pop; reggae; R&B
- Length: 39:31
- Label: Virgin Music
- Producers: Fred Ball; Nathan Butts; Clarence Coffee Jr.; Owen Cutts; Antonio Lamar Dixon; Alex Goldblatt; GYW Eli; Tyree Hawkins; the Imports; Lee on the Beats; PRGRSHN; Lasse Qvist; Oswaldo Randel; Khris Riddick; Khaled Rohaim; Elijah Ross; Rvssian; Track Starr; Yonatan Watts; Jonny Wood; Zhone

Leigh-Anne chronology
No Hard Feelings (2024)	My Ego Told Me To (2026)

Singles from My Ego Told Me To
- 1. "Been a Minute" Released: 18 July 2025; 2. "Burning Up" Released: 24 August 2025; 3. "Dead and Gone" Released: 16 October 2025; 4. "Most Wanted" Released: 21 January 2026

My Ego Told Me To is the first solo studio album by the English singer Leigh-Anne, released on 20 February 2026 through Virgin Music Group. The album includes the singles "Been a Minute", "Burning Up", "Dead and Gone", and "Most Wanted". "Tight Up Skirt" also received an official music video. The album reached number three on the UK Albums Chart, making Leigh-Anne the first Black English girl group member to achieve a top three solo album.

== Background and composition ==
Following the conclusion of Little Mix's the Confetti Tour in May 2022, Leigh-Anne signed a record deal with Warner Records after signing to management company TaP Music in March 2021 for her solo endeavours. Between the conclusion of the tour in May 2022 and May 2023, Leigh-Anne recorded various songs for her debut album in both the United Kingdom and a writing camp in Jamaica, with writers Abby-Lynn Keen, Tayla Parx, Khris Riddick-Tynes, Kassa, and Dyo. On 16 June 2023, Leigh-Anne released UK garage-influenced debut single "Don't Say Love", which topped the UK Singles Sales Chart, reached number two on the UK Singles Downloads Chart, and entered at number eleven on the UK Singles Chart. This was followed by second single "My Love" featuring Ayra Starr on 7 September 2023, which peaked in the Top 30 of the UK charts. In March 2024, Leigh-Anne announced the release of her debut EP, titled No Hard Feelings, featuring five tracks which "fit together in their own world", separate from her upcoming debut album. The project was preceded by the lead single "Stealin' Love", and later featured bonus track "Nature", which was created in her Jamaican writing sessions.

In May 2025, after a period of relative silence and social media rumblings of label strife, Leigh-Anne announced a new partnership with Virgin Music Group as an independent artist, following her departure from Warner Records. In July 2025, Leigh-Anne announced Masters at Work-sampling single "Been a Minute", which was released on 18 July. Another single, "Burning Up", was released a month later. In October, she released the single "Dead and Gone", and joined Sigala and Jonita on the song "Hello". On 15 October 2025, Leigh-Anne announced that her debut album My Ego Told Me To, would be released on 20 February 2026, and supported by the eight-date My Ego Told Me Tour, taking place in April 2026. Pinnock reportedly left Warner Records in January 2025, stating that the label lacked the budget to support the album release.

The standard edition of the album consists of fifteen tracks written by the singer herself in collaboration with numerous songwriters and producers, including Rvssian, Fred Ball, PRGRSHN, Clarence Coffee Jr., Keen, and Odeal. Leigh-Anne described the project in a Rolling Stone interview as "the truest representation of me as an artist. Versatile, rooted in reggae and my heritage, but stamped with pop. It’s personal and impossible to box in. I wanted it to feel authentic, blending the genres I love with a sound that’s distinctly mine... These are songs I’ll be proud of in five, ten years, because they reflect exactly where I was. You’ll hear my world in it... and the moment I embraced my fire side and said: no more. This is my show now.”

== Critical reception ==
Robin Murray of Clash praised Leigh-Anne and My Ego Told Me To for "standing on her truth" and highlighted its incorporation of various music genres, which she attributed to Leigh-Anne's background. In his review for Classic Pop, John Earls characterised the album as an "eclectic journey with confident songwriting at its core". He further praised Leigh-Anne's ability to delve into various music genres "without ever sounding like she's trying to chase any trends". Shatter the Standards awarded a four-out-of-five star review, commending Leigh-Anne's vocals as her "sturdiest instrument" and noting that the album "keeps arguing with itself about how honest it wants to be". The Arts Desk characterised the album as uneven, praising tracks such as "Look into My Eyes" and "Dead and Gone"; however, they felt that the album did not consistently uphold a higher standard of quality.

== Commercial performance ==
My Ego Told Me To debuted at number three on the UK Albums Chart with 10,545 album-equivalent units earned in its first week. Leigh-Anne made history by becoming the first Black English former member of a girl group to achieve a top three position with a solo album in the UK. Additionally, the album charted at number one on the UK Independent Albums Chart. Within Ireland, My Ego Told Me To entered at number five on the Irish Independent Albums Chart and number eighty-seven on the Irish Albums chart. Elsewhere, the album entered at number three on the Scottish Albums Chart and number seventeen on Swedish Physical Albums.

== Track listing ==
Standard track listing
No.	Title	Writer(s)	Producer(s)	Length
1.	"Look into My Eyes"	Leigh-Anne Pinnock; Clarence Coffee Jr.; Owen Cutts; Kevin Hickey	Coffee Jr.; Cutts; Zhone	2:24
2.	"Dead and Gone"	Coffee Jr.; Cutts; Hickey; L. Pinnock	Coffee Jr.; Cutts; Zhone	2:40
3.	"Revival"	L. Pinnock; Coffee Jr.; Cutts; Hickey	Coffee Jr.; Cutts; Zhone	2:41
4.	"Been a Minute"	L. Pinnock; Chazara Odom; Elijah Ross; J Warner; Anastas Hackett; Lasse Qvist	Ross; Qvist	3:20
5.	"Goodbye Goodmorning"	L. Pinnock; Alex Goldblatt; Sam Edmond; Amanda Reifer; Antonio Lamar Dixon	Goldblatt; Khris Riddick; Dixon	3:24
6.	"Burning Up"	Guylaire Leon Jr.; Emmanuel Boateng; Tyler Spears; Alexis Boateng; Jeremiah Green; Jamal Gaines; L. Pinnock	Ross; Yonatan Watts; Khaled Rohaim	2:06
7.	"Most Wanted" (with Rvssian and Valiant)	L. Pinnock; Rvssian; Oswaldo Randel; Raheem Bowes; Odeal; Andrew Green	Rvssian; Randel	2:15
8.	"Best Version of Me"	L. Pinnock; Ross; Dimitry Skeete; Odom; Shanel Blackman; Alanis Harris; Green	GYW Eli	2:47
9.	"Me Minus U"	L. Pinnock; Fred Ball; Kareen Lomax; Clementine Douglas	Ball	3:00
10.	"Sunrise"	L. Pinnock; Tyree Hawkins; Nathan Butts; Dayyon Alexander; Malika Hamzaa; Bubele Booi; David Balshaw; Dim Crx	Hawkins; Butts; the Imports	2:45
11.	"You Are a Star (Interlude)"	Byron Steve Pinnock; Annette Pinnock		1:08
12.	"Free"	L. Pinnock; Paris Ramos; Amber Deaton; Khadija Alexander; Yannick Lawrence; Green	GYW Eli; Track Starr	2:48
13.	"Tight Up Skirt"	L. Pinnock; Ross; Anthony Norris; Leon Jr.; E. Boateng; Tyler Spears; A. Boateng; K. Alexander; Green	Lee on the Beats; GYW Eli	2:21
14.	"Talk to Me Nice"	L. Pinnock; Jonny Wood; Bubele Booi; Darius Coleman	Wood; the Imports	2:48
15.	"Heaven"	L. Pinnock; Ras Haile Emmanuel Alexander; Dyo; Abby-Lynn Keen	PRGRSHN	3:04
Total length:				39:31

My Ego Told Me To...Do a Fan Edition bonus tracks
No.	Title	Writer(s)	Producer(s)	Length
16.	"Dead and Gone Part II" (featuring Kojey Radical)	Coffee Jr.; Cutts; Hickey; L. Pinnock	Kiris Houston	3:04
17.	"Ego"	L. Pinnock; Leon Jr.; Laurent Lamothe; Harris; Skeete; Green; Emilio Bowens; Terence Stith; Ross	Emilio Bowens; Ross	2:48
18.	"Clickbait"	L. Pinnock; Trey Campbell; Mark Landon; Bava	M-Phazes	3:07
19.	"Friends" (with Rvssian)	L. Pinnock; Theron Thomas; Rvssian; Terique Johnson; Randel; Duijai Blake	Rvssian	2:59
20.	"Been a Minute" (acoustic version)	L. Pinnock; Odom; Ross; J Warner; Anastas Hackett; Qvist	Ross; Lasse Lou Xtwo; WHOISALEXELLIOT	2:20
21.	"Home"	L. Pinnock; Leon Jr.; Skeete	Ross; Julian Maultsby; WHOISALEXELLIOT	2:27
22.	"Bora"	L. Pinnock; A. Boateng; Odom; Harris; Leon Jr.; Lamothe; Blackman; Green; E. Boateng; Skeete; Terence Stith	GYW Eli; Ross; WHOISALEXELLIOT	2:45

=== Note ===
- Two expanded editions of the album were released: My Ego Told Me To + included "Friends", "Ego Suicide" and "Dead and Gone Part II", while My Ego Told Me To ++ included "Home" and the acoustic version of "Been a Minute".

== Personnel ==
Credits adapted from Tidal.

- Leigh-Anne – vocals (tracks 1–10, 12–15)
- Khadija "Lola" Alexander – vocals (1)
- Elijah Ross – drums, programming (4)
- Lasse Qvist – drums, programming (4)
- Denise Belfon – background vocals (4)
- Rvssian – vocals (7)
- Valiant – vocals (7)
- Annette Pinnock – vocals (11)
- Byron Steve Pinnock – vocals (11)
- WhoIsAlexElliott – mixing (1, 3, 5, 6, 8–15)
- Jon Castelli – mixing (2, 4)
- Jay Reynolds – mixing (7)
- Brad Lauchert – mixing assistance (4)
- Kearon Stephen – mastering (1–3, 5–15)
- Dale Becker – mastering (4)
- Adam Burt – mastering assistance (4)
- Katie Harvey – mastering assistance (4)

== Charts ==
Chart performance
Chart (2026)	Peak position
Belgian Albums (Ultratop Flanders)	36
Belgian Albums (Ultratop Wallonia)	43
Irish Albums (IRMA)	87
Irish Independent Albums (IRMA)	5
Scottish Albums (Official Charts)	3
Spanish Vinyl Albums (PROMUSICAE)	35
Swedish Physical Albums (Sverigetopplistan)	17
UK Albums (Official Charts)	3
UK Independent Albums (Official Charts)	1
