= Leigh-Anne Pinnock =

English singer (born 1991)

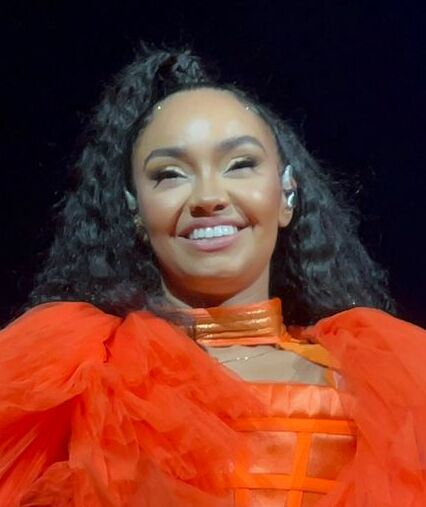
- Pinnock in 2022
- Born: 4 October 1991 (age 35); High Wycombe, Buckinghamshire, England
- Occupations: Singer; actress
- Years active: 2011–present
- Works: Solo discography; Little Mix discography; filmography
- Spouse: Andre Gray (m. 2023)
- Children: 3
- Awards: Full list (Note: For awards received as a member of Little Mix, see List of awards and nominations received by Little Mix.)
- Musical career
- Genres: R&B; pop
- Instrument: Vocals
- Labels: Warner; Virgin Music
- Member of: Little Mix
- Website: leigh-anneofficial.com

Leigh-Anne Pinnock (born 4 October 1991) is an English singer and actress. She rose to prominence as a member of the girl group Little Mix, which was formed on and won the eighth series of The X Factor. As part of the group, she won three Brit Awards and achieved 19 top-ten singles and five number-one entries on the UK Singles Chart before the group went on hiatus in 2022. In 2023, Pinnock began her solo career, releasing the singles "Don't Say Love" and "My Love" featuring Ayra Starr, both of which reached the top 30 of the UK Singles Chart.

In 2024, Pinnock released her third single, "Stealin' Love", which preceded the release of her debut EP, No Hard Feelings, on 31 May 2024. In July 2025, she released her first single as an independent artist, titled "Been a Minute". In February 2026, she released her debut solo album, My Ego Told Me To, which reached number three on the album charts in both the United Kingdom and Scotland.

Pinnock is noted for advocating racial issues and racial equality, earning her a National Diversity Award and a Visionary Honour Award. Her documentary, Leigh-Anne: Race, Pop & Power (2021), received critical acclaim and was nominated for Best Authored Documentary at the 26th National Television Awards. In 2021, she made her acting debut in the film Boxing Day. In 2023, she won the Musician of the Year and Breakthrough Artist awards at the Glamour Awards.

== Early life ==
Leigh-Anne Pinnock was born on 4 October 1991 in High Wycombe, Buckinghamshire. She was born to Black mixed-race parents; Deborah Thornhill, a history teacher, and John Pinnock, a champion boxer, and was raised in a Caribbean household. Both of her grandfathers migrated to the United Kingdom in the 1960s and entered interracial relationships. She has two older sisters, Sian-Louise and Sairah. Sairah became her manager following Little Mix's hiatus in 2022. She has Barbadian and Jamaican ancestry and considers Jamaica her second home.

Pinnock attended the Sir William Ramsay School in Hazlemere, where she was appointed head girl. Before joining Little Mix, Pinnock worked as a waitress at Pizza Hut and posted her music on MySpace and Facebook. Her early experience of organised singing came when she joined a youth club and choir run by Jay Blades, who later became a trustee of her charity The Black Fund, which she founded in 2021. In 2020, Pinnock spoke about her first experience of racism at age nine for a documentary that was later aired on Channel 4.

== Career ==
=== 2011–2022: Career beginnings and Little Mix ===
Pinnock auditioned as a soloist for the eighth series of The X Factor in 2011. Her first audition was "Only Girl (In the World)" by Rihanna. After she failed the first bootcamp challenge, she was placed in a three-piece group named "Orion" alongside Jade Thirlwall. Orion performed a rendition of "Yeah" by Chris Brown. Perrie Edwards and Jesy Nelson both were in another group called "Faux Pas". Faux Pas performed a rendition of "Survivor" by Destiny's Child. Both groups, however, were eliminated. Later, the four were called back by the judges and formed into the four-piece group Rhythmix, and they progressed to judges' houses. They reached the live shows and were mentored by Tulisa Contostavlos. On 28 October 2011, it was announced that the group name had changed to Little Mix. On 11 December 2011, Little Mix became the group to win the series. They became the first girl group to make it past week seven of the live shows, the first girl group to reach The X Factor final and the first and only girl group to win the show.

As of 2022, Pinnock has released six studio albums and a compilation album with the group: DNA (2012), Salute (2013), Get Weird (2015), Glory Days (2016), LM5 (2018) Confetti (2020), and Between Us (2021). Pinnock shares songwriting credits for more than 50 songs, across Little Mix's six studio albums. She has co-written two UK number one singles with "Wings" in 2012 and "Shout Out to My Ex" in 2016. In 2019, she signed with Sony/ATV as a published songwriter. With the group, Pinnock achieved nineteen top-ten singles, five number-ones, and six consecutive top-five albums on the UK Albums Chart, becoming the first girl group to achieve this and the first girl group to spend a total of 100 weeks within the top 10 of the UK Singles Chart. Since Little Mix's debut, they have become one of the best-selling girl groups and one of Britain's biggest selling acts.

In May 2021, her documentary, Leigh-Anne: Race, Pop & Power, was released on BBC iPlayer and BBC One to critical acclaim. It was centred around racial issues and colourism in the music industry and detailed her own personal experiences. It received a nomination for Best Authored Documentary at the 26th National Television Awards, and also won Documentary of the Year at the Visionary Honours Awards, Media Progress Moment at the Ethnicity Awards, and Best Documentary at the I Talk Telly Awards. In December 2021, the group announced they would be going on a hiatus to allow its members to pursue solo projects. That same month, she made her acting debut in the film Boxing Day, which she also recorded original music for. Pinnock Productions contributed to the production of the film.

=== 2022–present: No Hard Feelings and My Ego Told Me To ===
In February 2022, Pinnock signed a record deal with Warner Records, and signed to TaP Music in March 2021 for her solo endeavours. In July 2022, she joined YouTube and Twitter, and began teasing solo music. In September 2022, she spoke at the One Young World summit in Manchester. In December 2022, Pinnock uploaded a YouTube cover of "I Say a Little Prayer" which is featured in Boxing Day (2021).

In March 2023, Pinnock uploaded a cover of "Weak" by American R&B trio SWV onto YouTube. In the same month, she narrated The Little Mermaid for Audible UK. In April, she announced she would be releasing her first memoir, Believe, scheduled to be released on 26 October 2023. In the same month, she performed a cover of "ICU" by Coco Jones. In June, Pinnock announced her debut solo single titled "Don't Say Love", which was released on 16 June 2023 via Warner. On 11 June, she was featured on the cover of British Vogue. She was featured on the song "Running Away" from Jon Batiste's album World Music Radio, released on 18 August 2023. The same month she graced the cover of Rolling Stone.

On 7 September 2023, Leigh-Anne released "My Love" featuring Ayra Starr. On 15 September, Pinnock uploaded exclusive performances of "My Love" and "Don't Say Love" in partnership with Vevo. In October she was part of the BBC's Live Lounge line up and performed a cover version of "Paint the Town Red" by Doja Cat. On 18 October, she appeared on the cover of Glamour UK and won "Musician Of The Year" at the "Glamour Women Of The Year" awards. In November, she attended the German version of the award show, in which she won 'Breakthrough Artist'. Leigh-Anne later performed at Children in Need and performed alongside Iza at the Afropunk Festival in Brazil.

In December 2023, she performed at Jingle Bell Ball and performed a cover version of "Last Christmas" by Wham! and later that month performed a cover of Boyz II Men "Let It Snow". She also featured on the cover edition of Quem. in March 2024, Pinnock announced the release of a music project, separate from that of her debut album, called No Hard Feelings, which was released on 31 May 2024, featuring five tracks which "fit together in their own world". It was preceded by the lead single "Stealin' Love", where that same month she performed her first headline show in London and at Rock in Rio in Lisbon. In June she performed her own rendition of "Can You Feel the Love Tonight" at the Royal Albert Hall.

In May 2025, Pinnock said she had partnered with Virgin Music Group as an independent artist, following her departure from Warner Records. She stated that her former label lacked the budget to support her debut album release. Two months later, she announced the single, "Been a Minute", which was released on 18 July. Another single, "Burning Up", was released a month later. In October, she released the single "Dead and Gone", and joined Sigala and Jonita on the song "Hello". Pinnock's debut solo album, My Ego Told Me To, was released on 20 February 2026, and will be supported by the eight-date My Ego Told Me Tour, taking place in April 2026.

== Personal life ==
Pinnock has been in a relationship with professional footballer Andre Gray since 2016, after the pair met in Marbella. The couple moved in together in December 2018 and got engaged on their four-year anniversary in 2020. In May 2021, she announced that she was pregnant, and on 16 August 2021, she gave birth to non-identical twins. The couple married on 3 June 2023 in Jamaica. In May 2024, Pinnock shared a video on Instagram confirming that both twins are girls. In July 2026, she announced her second pregnancy on social media, confirming she was expecting their third child. She confirmed on the 18th November 2026 that her third child has been born, and is a boy.

Pinnock was attacked at a restaurant in London by a male customer in 2016. In February 2017, while performing with Little Mix as an opening act for Ariana Grande's Dangerous Woman Tour, she suffered a burn backstage at one of their gigs.

== Endorsements ==
In February 2015, Pinnock launched a Tumblr fashion blog called "Leigh Loves". She co-founded her own swimwear range in April 2019, titled In'A'Seashell, in partnership with her friend Gabrielle Urquhart. In the same month, she was announced as the new face of the sports brand Umbro. In April 2019, Pinnock signed to Sony/ATV via a joint venture, TwentySeven, as a published songwriter. In October 2020, she launched her own production house named Pinnock Productions, to help embrace diversity and cultures that are under-represented in the media. In 2020, the singer released a style edit collection with ASOS, a British fashion retailer. In 2021, in partnership with her fiancé Andre Gray and her sister, she launched The Black Fund, a charity to support existing charities and groups to deliver support to Black communities, including financial support. Pinnock is an ambassador for Maybelline New York, and in 2021 launched the "Brave Together" initiative in October.

== Activism and public image ==
Pinnock is noted for her social justice advocacy; she speaks on issues including the Black Lives Matter movement, racial equality, colourism, feminism, and racism in the UK. To this end, she has shared her own experiences with racism as a child, as well as in the music industry. Early into her career, she refrained from discussing about these subjects over fears she would offend people and lose fans. In an interview with Glamour magazine, she spoke about her experiences with race and how she felt "invisible" for the first three years as the only black girl in Little Mix, while at the same time acknowledging her own privilege as a light-skinned, mixed-race woman.

"My reality was feeling lonely while touring predominantly to white countries. I sang to fans who don't see me or hear me or cheer me on. My reality is feeling anxious before fan events and signings because I always feel like I'm the least favoured. My reality is constantly feeling like I have to work 10 times harder and longer to mark my place in the group, because my talent alone isn't enough. My reality is all the times I felt invisible within my group. Part of me is fully aware that my experience would have been even harder to deal with had I been dark-skinned. Our reality is no matter how far you think you've come, racism exists. — Pinnock on the racism she has experienced throughout her career.

In 2019, Pinnock attended Pride in London, marching alongside charity organisations Mermaids, Stonewall, and Black Pride, to advocate for trans and LGBTQ rights. She also attended the Black Lives Matter protests in London, and she has spoken out about the murders of African Americans George Floyd and Breonna Taylor by American police.

In 2019, Pinnock (who is also known for her charity work), as well as other British celebrities, climbed Mount Kilimanjaro to raise funds for Comic Relief's Red Nose Day. In 2021, in partnership with her fiancé and sister Sairah, she launched a charity called The Black Fund, which supports existing charities and groups who deliver support to the black community, including financial support. In 2022, the charity co-funded two scholarships for young creative black leaders to expand their visions in Tokyo.

In July 2023, Pinnock was awarded an honorary doctorate from Buckinghamshire New University in recognition of her anti-racism and racial equality work.

In September 2025, Pinnock spoke at the Together for Palestine charity concert, held to raise funds for Palestinian-led organisations operating in the Gaza Strip. Pinnock also sung on "Lullaby", a charity single released in December 2025 for the Together for Palestine fund.

== Artistry ==
Pinnock cites Mariah Carey and Rihanna amongst her musical influences.

== Selected works ==
- Leigh-Anne Pinnock, Believe, (London, 2023) ISBN 978-1-0354-0349-3
- (with Perrie Edwards, Jesy Nelson and Jade Thirlwall) Little Mix: ready to fly (London, 2012) ISBN 978-0-00-748816-2
- (with Perrie Edwards, Jesy Nelson and Jade Thirlwall) Our World (London, 2016) ISBN 978-1-4059-2743-7

== Discography ==
=== Studio albums ===
List of studio albums
Title	Details	Peak chart positions			
Title	Details	UK	UK Ind.	IRE	SCO
My Ego Told Me To	Released: 20 February 2026; Label: Virgin Music; Format: Cassette, CD, digital download, LP, streaming	3	1	87	3

=== Extended plays ===
Title	Details	Peak chart positions			
Title	Details	SCO	UK Alb. Sales	UK Phy.	UK Vinyl
No Hard Feelings	Released: 31 May 2024; Formats: Digital download, LP, streaming; Label: Warner	35	38	32	10
City Sessions (Amazon Music Live)	Released: 22 November 2024; Formats: Digital download, streaming; Label: Warner	—	—	—	—
"—" denotes releases that did not chart or were not released in that region.

=== Singles ===
List of singles as lead artist, showing year released, with selected chart positions and album name
Title	Year	Peak chart positions										Album
Title	Year	UK	CRO	IRE	LAT	NIG	NZ Hot	HUN	SR	CZ	US Afro	Album
"Don't Say Love"	2023	11	85	45	33	99	18	6	—	5	—	Non-album singles
"My Love" (featuring Ayra Starr or Jireel)	2023	28	—	—	32	51	—	—	5	—	32	Non-album singles
"Stealin' Love"	2024	— (Note: "Stealin' Love" did not enter the UK Singles Chart, but peaked at number 64 on the UK Singles Sales Chart.)	—	—	—	—	—	—	—	—	—	No Hard Feelings
"Forbidden Fruit"	2024	— (Note: "Forbidden Fruit" did not enter the UK Singles Chart, but peaked at number 48 on the UK Singles Sales Chart.)	—	—	—	—	—	—	—	—	—	No Hard Feelings
"OMG"	2024	—	—	—	—	—	—	—	—	—	—	No Hard Feelings
"Been a Minute"	2025	— (Note: "Been a Minute" did not enter the UK Singles Chart, but peaked at number 31 on the UK Singles Sales Chart.)	—	—	—	—	—	—	—	—	—	My Ego Told Me To
"Burning Up"	2025	—	—	—	—	—	—	—	—	—	—	My Ego Told Me To
"Hello" (with Sigala and Jonita)	2025	— (Note: "Hello" did not enter the UK Singles Chart, but peaked at number 7 on the UK Official Asian Music Chart.)	—	—	—	—	—	—	—	—	—	TBA
"Dead and Gone"	2025	— (Note: "Dead and Gone" did not enter the UK Singles Chart, but peaked at number 55 on the UK Singles Sales Chart.)	—	—	—	—	—	—	—	—	—	My Ego Told Me To
"Friends" (featuring Rvssian)	2025	—	—	—	—	—	—	—	—	—	—	My Ego Told Me To Do A Fan Edition
"Most Wanted" (featuring Valiant and Rvssian)	2026	— (Note: "Most Wanted" did not enter the UK Singles Chart, but peaked at number 66 on the UK Singles Sales Chart.)	—	—	—	86	—	—	—	—	—	My Ego Told Me To
"—" denotes releases that did not chart or were not released in that region.

=== Promotional Singles ===
List of singles as lead artist, showing year released, with selected chart positions and album name
Title	Year	Album
"Tight Up Skirt"	2026	My Ego Told Me To
"Clickbait"	2026	My Ego Told Me To Do A Fan Edition

=== Guest appearances ===
Title	Year	Other artist(s)	Album
"Running Away"	2023	Jon Batiste	World Music Radio
"Lullaby"	2025	Amena Youssef, Brian Eno, Celeste, Dan Smith, Kieran Brunt, Lana Lubany, London Community Gospel Choir, Mabel, Nadine Shah, Nai Barghouti, Neneh Cherry, Sura Abdo, Tyson, Yasmeen Ayyashi, Ysee	Charity single
"Closure"	2026	Amaria BB	Comes to Light

=== Songwriting credits ===
List of songwriting credits, with year released and album shown
Year	Artist	Album	Song	Notes
2012	Little Mix	DNA	"Wings"	Co-writer
2012	Little Mix	DNA	"DNA"	Co-writer
2012	Little Mix	DNA	"Change Your Life"	Co-writer
2012	Little Mix	DNA	"Pretend It's OK"	Co-writer
2012	Little Mix	DNA	"How Ya Doin'?"	Co-writer
2012	Little Mix	DNA	"Going Nowhere"	Co-writer
2012	Little Mix	DNA	"Madhouse"	Co-writer
2012	Little Mix	DNA	"Love Drunk"	Co-writer
2012	Little Mix	DNA	"Case Closed"	Co-writer
2013	Little Mix	Salute	"Salute"	Co-writer
2013	Little Mix	Salute	"Move"	Co-writer
2013	Little Mix	Salute	"Little Me"	Co-writer
2013	Little Mix	Salute	"Nothing Feels like You"	Co-writer
2013	Little Mix	Salute	"Competition"	Co-writer
2013	Little Mix	Salute	"These Four Walls"	Co-writer
2013	Little Mix	Salute	"About the Boy"	Co-writer
2013	Little Mix	Salute	"Good Enough"	Co-writer
2013	Little Mix	Salute	"A Different Beat"	Co-writer
2013	Little Mix	Salute	"They Just Don't Know You"	Co-writer
2013	Little Mix	Salute	"Stand Down"	Co-writer
2015	Little Mix	Get Weird	"Grown"	Co-writer
2015	Little Mix	Get Weird	"I Love You"	Co-writer
2015	Little Mix	Get Weird	"OMG"	Co-writer
2015	Little Mix	Get Weird	"Lightning"	Co-writer
2015	Little Mix	Get Weird	"I Won't"	Co-writer
2015	Little Mix	Get Weird	"Clued Up"	Co-writer
2015	Britney Spears & Iggy Azalea	Non-album single	"Pretty Girls"	Co-writer
2016	Little Mix	Glory Days	"Shout Out to My Ex"	Co-writer
2016	Little Mix	Glory Days	"Down & Dirty"	Co-writer
2016	Little Mix	Glory Days	"Private Show"	Co-writer
2018	Little Mix	LM5	"The National Manthem"	Co-writer
2018	Little Mix & Sharaya J	LM5	"Strip"	Co-writer
2018	Little Mix	LM5	"Joan of Arc"	Co-writer
2018	Little Mix	LM5	"Love a Girl Right"	Co-writer
2018	Little Mix	LM5	"Motivate"	Co-writer
2018	Little Mix	LM5	"Notice"	Co-writer
2019	Little Mix	Confetti	"One I've Been Missing"	Co-writer
2020	Little Mix	Confetti	"Break Up Song"	Co-writer
2020	Little Mix	Confetti	"Holiday"	Co-writer
2020	Little Mix	Confetti	"Not a Pop Song"	Co-writer
2020	Little Mix	Confetti	"Gloves Up"	Co-writer
2020	Little Mix	Confetti	"A Mess (Happy 4 U)"	Co-writer
2021	Galantis, David Guetta and Little Mix	Between Us	"Heartbreak Anthem"	Co-writer
2021	Little Mix	Between Us	"Love (Sweet Love)"	Co-writer
2021	Little Mix	Between Us	"No"	Co-writer
2021	Little Mix	Between Us	"Between Us"	Co-writer
2021	Herself	Boxing Day	"Woman"	Co-writer
2023	Herself	Non-album single	"Don't Say Love"	Co-writer
2023	Jon Batiste	World Music Radio	"Running Away"	Co-writer
2023	Herself	Non-album single	"My Love"	Co-writer
2024	Herself	No Hard Feelings	"Stealin' Love"	Co-writer
2024	Herself	No Hard Feelings	"Forbidden Fruit"	Co-writer
2024	Herself	No Hard Feelings	"OMG"	Co-writer
2024	Herself	No Hard Feelings	"Anticipate"	Co-writer
2024	Herself	No Hard Feelings	"I'll Still Be Here"	Co-writer
2024	Herself	No Hard Feelings	"Nature"	Writer
2025	Herself	My Ego Told Me To	"Been a Minute"	Co-writer
2025	Herself	My Ego Told Me To	"Burning Up"	Co-writer
2025	Herself	My Ego Told Me To	"Dead and Gone"	Co-writer
2025	Herself & Rvssian	My Ego Told Me To Do A Fan Edition	"Friends"	Co-writer
2026	Herself, Valiant & Rvssian	My Ego Told Me To	"Most Wanted"	Co-writer

== Videography ==
=== Music videos ===
List of music videos, showing year released and director(s)
Title	Year	Other artist(s)	Director(s)	Ref.
As lead artist
"Don't Say Love"	2023	—N/a	Emil Nava	
"My Love"	2023	Ayra Starr	Meji Alabi	
"Stealin' Love"	2024	—N/a	Nathan James Tettey	
"Forbidden Fruit"	2024	—N/a	Nathan James Tettey	
"OMG"	2024	—N/a	Nathan James Tettey	
"Been A Minute"	2025	—N/a	Femi Ladi	
"Friends"	2025	Rvssian	DIFTY	
"Most Wanted"	2026	Valiant & Rvssian	Miranda May	
"Tight Up Skirt"	2026	—N/a	Cam Heyes	

== Filmography ==
Movies and Television Series
Year	Title	Role	Notes	Ref.
2021	Boxing Day	Georgia	Film	
2026	The Celebrity Traitors	Contestant	Series 2	

== Tours ==
- No Hard Feelings Tour (2024)
- My Ego Told Me To Tour (2026)

== Awards and nominations ==
In 2026, Leigh-Anne became the first black british girlband member to achieve a top 3 solo UK album.

List of awards and nominations received by Leigh-Anne Pinnock
Year	Award ceremony	Category	Nominee(s)/work(s)	Result	Ref.
2018	CelebMix Awards	Biggest Inspiration	Herself	Nominated	
2019	Ethnicity Awards	Influencer	Herself	Nominated	
2020	CelebMix Awards	Biggest Inspiration	Herself	Nominated	
2020	Ethnicity Awards	Inspirational Personality	Herself	Nominated	
2020	Ethnicity Awards	Equality Award	Herself	Won	
2020	National Diversity Awards	Celebrity of the Year	Herself	Won	
2021	National Television Awards	Authored Documentary	Leigh-Anne: Race, Pop & Power	Eliminated	
2021	Ethnicity Awards	Media Progress Moment	Leigh-Anne: Race, Pop & Power	Won	
2021	I Talk Telly Awards	Best Documentary	Leigh-Anne: Race, Pop & Power	Won	
2022	Visionary Honours Awards	Documentary of the Year	Leigh-Anne: Race, Pop & Power	Won	
2022	Burberry British Diversity Awards	Media Champion in Public Eye	Herself	Won	
2022	Ethnicity Awards	Inspirational Public Figure	Herself	Nominated	
2023	Glamour Awards	Musician of the Year	Herself	Won	
2023	Glamour Awards	Breakthrough Artist	Herself	Won	
2023	MBCC Awards	Honorary Inspirational	Herself	Won	
2024	Global Awards	Best Female	Herself	Nominated	
2024	Global Awards	Best Pop	Herself	Nominated	
2024	Global Awards	Best British Act	Herself	Nominated	
2024	UK Music Video Awards	Best R&B/Soul Video - UK	"My Love" (feat. Ayra Starr)	Nominated	
