= Ana Betancourt =

Cuban revolutionary

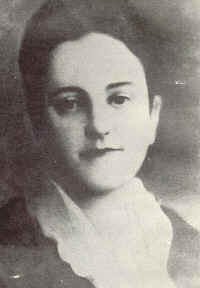
- Born: Ana Betancourt; 14 December 1832; Camagüey, Cuba
- Died: 2 July 1901 (aged 68); Madrid, Spain
- Known for: Support of Cuban independence from Spain and her support of women's emancipation as part of the struggle

Ana Betancourt (14 December 1832 – 7 February 1901) was a Cuban woman who took a leading role in the war of independence from Spain. She is a national heroine in Cuba.

== Life ==
Ana Betancourt was born on 14 December 1832 in Camagüey, Cuba to a wealthy land owning family. When she was 22, she was exposed to revolutionary ideas from her marriage to Ignacio Mora y de la Pera. He was extremely educated and strongly believed in independence. During the first stage of revolutionary conflict in 1868 known as the Ten Years War, Betancourt turned her home into a command center, supplying rebels with supplies and helping spread propaganda. Weapons were hidden in the house and varying proclamations were written there. Eventually, Spanish officers found Betancourt and she was forced to flee into the jungle. It was at this time she gave her famous speech at the Constitutional Assembly of Cuban patriots at Guáimaro in which she advocated for women having more freedoms in the new government. Betancourt was becoming a well known Mambisa. It was at this time, she, along with her husband contributed to the newspaper, "The Mambí" which highlighted on the contributions of the Mambises in rural areas.

On 9 July 1871, she and her husband were taken by surprise by the Spanish forces. Utilizing quick thinking, Betancourt was able to save her husband but arthritis in her legs made it impossible to escape. She was kept outdoors under a tree for three months until she escaped captivity in 1871. She hid in Havana but was then exiled to Mexico. Betancourt then spent time in New York where she visited Ulysses Grant, to ask the US to pardon imprisoned Cuban medical students. She then lived in Jamaica, where in 1875 she heard that her husband had been executed. Following her escape she never saw la Pera again. She was to return to Cuba following his death. She eventually left Cuba again, visiting New York and then settling in Spain. She transcribed her husband's war time journal and kept active correspondence with Cuban patriots up until her death. At the age of 69 she was about to return to her native country but contracted fulminating bronchopneumonia and died before she could begin her journey. She died in 1901. Cuba was occupied by the US at time and her remains were unable to be sent to Cuba until 1978. She was then buried in the pantheon of the Revolutionary Armed Forces, in the Cemetery Colón in Havana. After this honor, a mausoleum was erected for her in Guáimaro, the site of her famous speech. She remains there to this day.

== Mambisas ==
The first Cuban war of independence from Spain began in 1868. Women, known as Mambisas, played a significant role in the war in a variety of different ways. These women played active roles in the conflict as insurgents, nurses, and even officers in certain cases. The mambisas supported the cause in more subtle ways as well. They fundraised for the Mambi and organized pro-independence groups while also acting as reporters and journalists. They advocated for both independence as well as increased rights for women.

== Speech at the Constituent Assembly of Guáimaro ==
The Speech at the Constituent Assembly of Guáimaro is one of the first pieces from Cuban feminists during the Cuban revolution. Betancourt gave the speech to the leaders of the Cuban revolutionary when they were taking refuge in the jungles of Guáimaro from the Spanish military. In it, Betancourt looked at the issues of colonialism and slavery and linked them to the struggles of Cuban women. She argued that Cuba had freed enslaved people and should now work to emancipate the woman, and lawmakers should make it a central focus when they create policies following the revolution. Betancourt advocated for women's rights well up until her death.

== Commemorations ==
She is commemorated in the modern Cuba by the Order of Ana Betancourt medal, awarded to Cuban women who "demonstrate revolutionary and internationalist merit and anti-imperialist fidelity and/or great merit in a field of work that contributes to the national interest." Originally this was the highest award of the Federation of Cuban Women, and the order was officially sanctioned in 1979 as a state award. Notable recipients include the Palestinian poet May Sayegh.

In honor of all the work Ana Betancourt did for women, a series of schools have been created in her honor across Cuba. The Ana Betancourt schools were established originally in the 1960s. The school's purpose was to get rural girls up to a sixth grade education and had two coinciding goals. They wanted to both instill revolutionary ideals along with vocational skills, and provide opportunities for prostitutes and those employed in domestic service to join the work force. In the beginning year alone over 6,000 rural girls were brought in for six month programs. Looking towards post-revolutionary years, a number of Ana Betancourt Schools still exist in Cuba today and continue to serve communities of women in both urban and rural parts of Cuba.
