= Together for Palestine =

2025 benefit concert

Together For Palestine
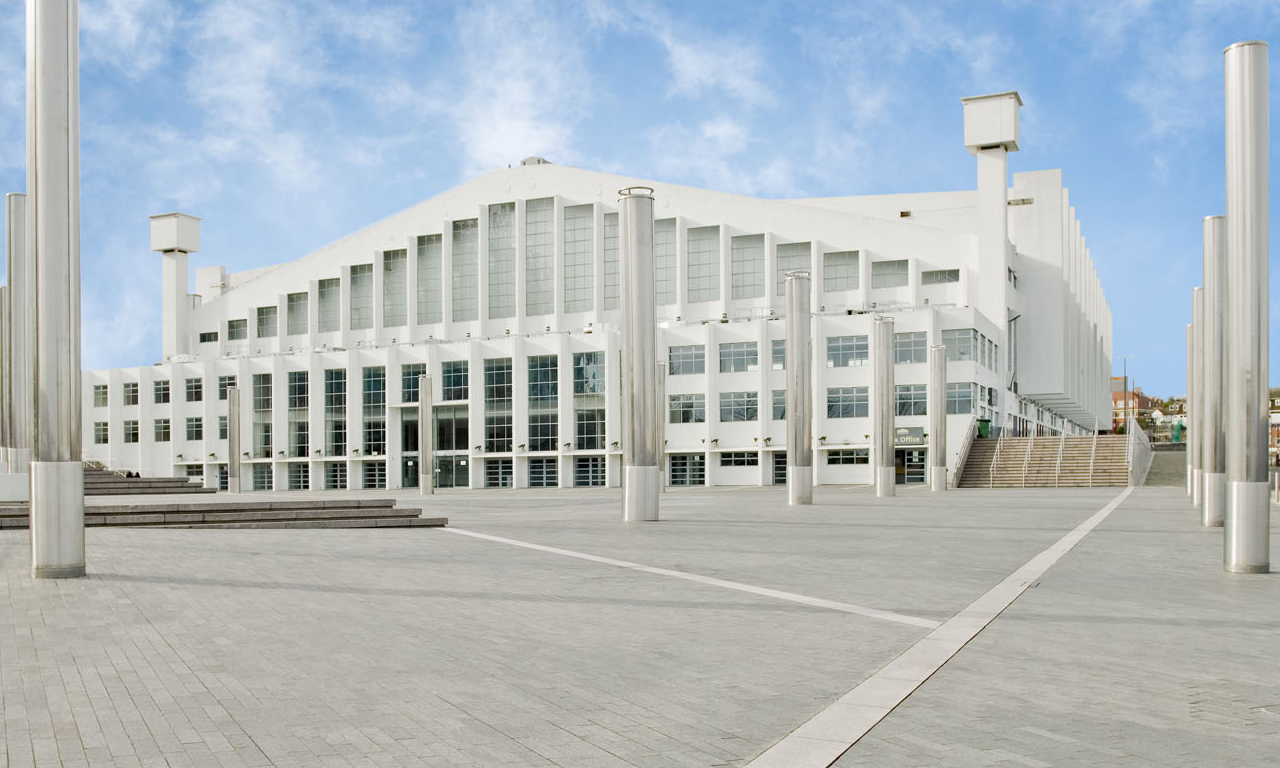
- Wembley Arena in February 2007
- Location: Wembley, Greater London, England
- Venue: Wembley Arena
- Date: 17 September 2025
- Attendance: 12,500
- Website: Official website

Together for Palestine was a benefit concert that took place on 17 September 2025 at Wembley Arena in Wembley, England. The fundraiser was organised by British artist Brian Eno. The event aimed to raise funds and awareness for Palestinian civilians affected by the ongoing conflict in Gaza, with all proceeds from ticket sales, merchandise, and donations going to Palestinian-led organisations. The funds were distributed through the UK-based charity Choose Love, which works with partner groups on the ground, including the Palestine Children's Relief Fund (PCRF), the Palestinian Medical Relief Society (PMRS), and Taawon. The event sought to highlight Palestinian art and culture, featuring a stage design by Es Devlin in collaboration with Gazan painter Malak Mattar, and showcasing the work of other Palestinian visual artists. The show was produced by Eno, film producer Tracey Seaward, actor Khalid Abdalla, and London-Palestine Film Festival founder Khaled Ziada. The concert featured performances and speeches 69 artists, actors, activists, and cultural figures, drawing an audience of approximately 12,500 people and livestreaming to over 200,000 viewers worldwide. It raised £2,000,000.

== Organization ==
British artist Brian Eno was the concert's lead organiser. Eno, film producer Tracey Seaward, actor Khalid Abdalla, and London-Palestine Film Festival founder Khaled Ziada produced the show. English stage designer Es Devlin and Gazan painter Malak Mattar collaborated on the show's stage design, showcasing the work of Palestinian visual artists. Eno described the 1988 Nelson Mandela 70th Birthday Tribute concert, also held at Wembley Arena, as an inspiration for the concert.

=== Challenges ===
The concert faced a series of logistical and reputational challenges. Eno wrote that simply mentioning "Palestine" led venues to refuse bookings, making it difficult to secure a site until Wembley ultimately agreed. Similar hesitation extended to distribution: YouTube only "finally consented" to stream the event, and Eno indicated there was an inflection point when artists agreed to appear, suggesting earlier reluctance amid political sensitivities. The concert took 18 months to organise.

== Fundraising ==
Funds raised by the concert will be distributed by Choose Love to organisations including Taawon, Palestine Children's Relief Fund, and Palestine Medical Relief Service. Tickets for the 12,500-capacity event sold out within hours, with an official online stream also made available, with reports of over 200,000 viewers. By the end of the night, it was announced that £1,500,000 (US$2,000,000) had been raised through ticket sales, merchandise sales, and donations. The concert raised £2,000,000 in total.

== Performances ==
The four-hour event combined live music, speeches, poetry readings, and pre-recorded messages from 69 musicians, artists, and activists. Performers included Bastille, James Blake, Paloma Faith, and Jamie xx, alongside Palestinian artists such as Sama’ Abdulhadi, Saint Levant, Elyanna, Nai Barghouti and Lana Lubany. Notable speakers included actors Florence Pugh, Nicola Coughlan, and Benedict Cumberbatch, as well as broadcaster Mehdi Hasan, footballer Eric Cantona, and UN special rapporteur Francesca Albanese. Several speakers emphasised the urgency of the humanitarian crisis and criticised celebrity silence about the war. The production also foregrounded Palestinian art and literature. The set featured works by eight Palestinian artists killed by Israeli forces during the conflict. Brian Eno read the poem "Oh rascal children of Gaza" by Palestinian writer Khaled Juma.

The following guests and artists has made appearance and performed at the show:

=== Performers ===
- Adnan Joubran
- Annie Lennox (pre-recorded performance of "Why")
- Bastille
- Brian Eno
- Cat Burns
- Celeste
- Damon Albarn
- El Far3i
- Elyanna
- Faraj Suleiman
- Gorillaz
- Greentea Peng
- Hot Chip
- Ibibio Sound Machine
- James Blake
- Jamie xx
- King Krule
- Lana Lubany
- Leigh-Anne
- London Arab Orchestra
- London Community Gospel Choir
- Mabel
- Madame Gandhi
- Nadine Shah
- Nai Barghouti
- Neneh Cherry
- Obongjayar
- Omar Souleyman
- Paloma Faith
- Paul Weller
- Portishead (pre-recorded performance of 'Roads')
- Rachel Chinouriri
- Sama' Abdulhadi
- Sampha
- Saint Levant
- Sura Abdo
- Trans Voices
- Yasiin Bey

=== Appearances ===
- Amena Youssef
- Amelia Dimoldenberg
- Amer Hlehel
- Benedict Cumberbatch
- Bilal Hasna
- Billie Eilish
- Charithra Chandran
- Cillian Murphy
- Diana Buttu
- Dr Ghassan Abu-Sittah
- Dr Victoria Rose
- Eric Cantona
- Florence Pugh
- Francesca Albanese
- Guy Pearce
- Guz Khan
- Inua Ellams
- Jameela Jamil
- Joaquin Phoenix
- Khalid Abdalla
- Laura Whitmore
- Louis Theroux
- Mahmoud Sarsak
- Malak Mattar
- Malala Yousafzai
- Mary Nazzal
- Mehdi Hasan
- Misan Harriman
- Motaz Malhees
- Munroe Bergdorf
- Penélope Cruz
- Pinkpantheress
- Ramy Youssef
- Rina Sawayama
- Riz Ahmed
- Ruth Negga
- Stephen Kapos
- Yara Eid
- Yasmeen Ayyashi
- Ysee
- Zainab Jiwa

== Reception ==
The London Standard gave the concert 4 out of 5 stars, particularly praising the performance of Palestinian artists and noting "in a situation that has felt increasingly irredeemable, Together For Palestine provided a vital beacon of hope." Shaad D'Souza of Pitchfork wrote that unlike other benefit concerts, "no attempts were made to act like we are not living in desolate times." He described the concert as "bittersweet" yet hopeful, noting that protests have failed to change the United Kingdom's support for Israel during the war.

NME praised the event as a powerful, well-orchestrated act of solidarity that "blended art, advocacy, and fundraising," highlighting the nearly £1.5 million raised for Palestinian-led groups. The outlet emphasised moving performances from Palestinian artists alongside star turns by Damon Albarn, Brian Eno, and Yasiin Bey, and lauded speeches that kept focus on Gaza’s humanitarian crisis. Ammar Kalia of The Guardian also highlighted "the breadth and depth of Palestinian artistry on display," emphasising how the event centered on cultural expression.

Writing for The Times, Stephen Dalton wrote that the show was "impressively polished and sumptuously mounted" and "In pleasing contrast to charity gigs in bygone decades, Palestinian voices were central to this event." Gabriele Malvisi of Arab News called the show "a powerful testament to the strength of non-violent resistance in an era where brute force is deployed in the name of the few and language is increasingly weaponized to sow division and discord." Writing for The Independent, Adam White stated that the show "holds an undeniable power, fuelled by grief, celebration, and a bittersweet sense that this all should have happened far sooner."

== Charity single ==
"Lullaby"

Single by Together for Palestine
- Released: 12 December 2025
- Length: 7:16; 4:05 (edit)
- Label: T4P
- Composers: Kieran Brunt; Nai Barghouti
- Lyricist: Peter Gabriel
- Producer: Brian Eno

Together for Palestine released a charity single titled "Lullaby" on 12 December 2025. The song is a reworking of the Palestinian lullaby "Yamma Mwel El Hawa", translated by Peter Gabriel and arranged and composed by Kieran Brunt and Nai Barghouti. The single's cover artwork is by Malak Mattar.

The following artists appeared on the single:

=== List of artists ===
- Amena Youssef
- Brian Eno
- Celeste
- Dan Smith (Bastille)
- Kieran Brunt
- Lana Lubany
- Leigh-Anne Pinnock
- London Community Gospel Choir
- Mabel
- Nadine Shah
- Nai Barghouti
- Neneh Cherry
- Noam Bettan
- Sura Abdo
- Tyson
- Yasmeen Ayyashi
- Ysee

=== Charts ===
Chart (2025)	Peak position
Ireland (IRMA)	50
New Zealand Hot Singles (RMNZ)	6
UK Singles (Official Charts)	5
UK Indie (Official Charts)	2
US World Digital Song Sales (Billboard)	1

== See also ==
- Artists4Ceasefire
- No Music for Genocide
- Boycott, Divestment and Sanctions
- Writers Against the War on Gaza
- Disinvestment from Israel
