= Widad Qamari =

Palestinian militant (1939–2022)

- وداد قمري
- Born: 1939; Jerusalem, Mandatory Palestine
- Died: 30 June 2022 (aged 82–83); Amman, Jordan
- Occupation: Militant
- Organization: General Union of Palestinian Women; Popular Front for the Liberation of Palestine
- Political party: Arab Nationalist Movement

Widad Yusif Qamari (Arabic: وداد قمري; 1939 – 30 June 2022) was a Palestinian militant who worked with the General Union of Palestinian Women and the Popular Front for the Liberation of Palestine during their early years of existence, including in exile in Jordan. She appeared on Arab Loutfi's film Tell Your Tale, Little Bird.

== Biography ==
Widad Yusif Qamari was born in 1939 in Jerusalem to a Palestinian family native to the city. She originally worked in schools run by UNRWA. An Arab nationalist, she was one of the first women activists of the Arab Nationalist Movement (ANM) and a founding member of the General Union of Palestinian Women, and she promoted national political movements towards people at UNRWA schools and other Palestinian women. She was also involved in feminist labor activism.

She was persecuted due to her activism, for which she was once arrested in 1966. Following the end of the Six-Day War, Israeli authorities connected her to the Palestinian militants whom she had supplied weapons to, and they subsequently issued her a deportation order; she therefore fled to bordering Jordan, and she later became considered a part of the foundation of the Popular Front for the Liberation of Palestine (PFLP). Her work with the PFLP includes many of Wadie Haddad's missions, as well as the prison break of Secretary-General George Habash.

Shms News Agency noted that she was known "by all fighters from all factions as having a revolutionary purity and a high capacity for covert action and preparation for armed struggle within the occupied territories, from the very beginning of her resistance." The Palestinian Refugees Portal called her "struggle [...] an inspiration to many Palestinian women of her generation and subsequent generations in the Popular Front". Her autobiography was also the inspiration for Ghassan Kanafani's novel Barquq Naysan (1972).

In 1982, Saudi authorities arrested her due to her connections with the PFLP. After being released from prison in 1986, she become one of the early members of the Union of Palestinian Women's Committees after she moved to Damascus. She later returned to Palestine, where she worked at the Palestine Research Center as a librarian. In 1990, she moved back to Jordan. Despite her initial reluctance to talk about her experience with the movement, including with the media, she eventually agreed to appear on Arab Loutfi's film Tell Your Tale, Little Bird.

She was also close to George Habash's wife Hilda.

She died in Amman on 30 June 2022; she was 83.
