= Jamila Saidam =

Palestinian politician (1947–2011)

Member of the Legislative Council
- In office 1996–2006
- Constituency: Deir al-Balah

Personal details
- Born: 1947 Aqir, Mandatory Palestine
- Died: July 30, 2011 (aged 63–64) Ramallah, Palestinian territories

Jamila Ahmed Khamis Saidam (Arabic: جميلة أحمد خميس صيدم, 1947 – 30 July 2011), also known as Umm Sabri, was a Palestinian politician. She was one of the first group of women elected to the Legislative Council in 1996.

== Biography ==
Saidam was born in the village of Aqir in 1947. During the 1948 Arab–Israeli War her family fled to Rafah in the Gaza Strip, where she attended a UNWRA primary school and then secondary school in Rafah.

She postponed attending university after marrying Mamdouh Saidam, a founding member of Fatah, in 1968. In the same year, she moved to Jordan and attended the founding conference of the General Union of Palestinian Women. The couple moved to Syria, where Saidam began studying at Damascus University, but with her husband increasingly involved in militant activities, she was unable to complete her studies. However, Mamdouh died in 1971, and Saidam graduated from Damascus University in 1981.

Saidam later lived in Lebanon and Tunisia. In 1989 she was elected to Fatah's Revolutionary Council, and following the Oslo Accords, she was allowed to return to the Gaza Strip in 1994, where she co-founded the General Women's Union in Gaza. In 1995 she was appointed Director General of Social Insurance at the Ministry of Labour.

In the 1996 elections to the Legislative Council, Saidam ran as a Fatah candidate in Deir al-Balah. She was one of five women elected, becoming the first female Palestinian MPs. During her term in office, she chaired the Refugee Committee from 2005 to 2006, and was a member of the Economic and Human Rights committees. She lost her seat in the 2006 elections.

She died in Ramallah in July 2011. Her son Sabri later served as Minister of Education.
