= Samiha Khalil =

Palestinian politician (1923-1999)

Member of the Palestinian National Council

Personal details
- Born: 20 April 1923 Anabta, Mandatory Palestine
- Died: 26 February 1999 (aged 75) Ramallah, Palestine
- Party: Democratic Front for the Liberation of Palestine
- Spouse: Salameh Khalil
- Children: 5

Samiha Yousif Al-Qabaj (Note: Arabic: فيصل بن عبدالعزيز آل سعود) (20 April 1923 – 26 February 1999), also known as Umm Khalil, was a Palestinian charity worker and politician. She was a member of the Palestinian National Council and National Guidance Committee. She ran for president of Palestine in the 1996 election.

== Early life and education ==
Samiha Yousif Al-Qabaj was born in Anabta, Mandatory Palestine, on 20 April 1923, to Yusuf al-Qabaj and Halima Tuqan. At age three she was sent her to live with her maternal aunt in Nablus by her mother as Anabta did not have a primary school for girls. She was educated in Nablus before returning to Anabta and was later educated in Tulkarm. In Tulkarm the students demonstrated against Jewish immigration and the British Mandate and Khalil gave a nationalist speech at age 12. She was educated in Ramallah for three years. She had to complete her education at home and through private lessons as her father opposed her attending mixed-gender classes.

Khalil married teacher and principal Salameh Khalil, with whom she had five children, in Taybeh, Ramallah, in 1940. When the 1948 Palestine war broke out, Khalil and her husband were vacationing in Tulkarm and Taybeh and was unable to return to Majdal. They stayed in Jerusalem for a few days before going to Gaza City.

In Gaza, Khalil's husband worked for the Ministry of Education of the Egyptian-controlled All-Palestine Protectorate. In 1952, her family returned to Tulkarm by sailing to Beirut and then travelling on land through Damascus and Amman. Her husband was employed by UNRWA in Ramallah and he was the only source of income for the family. She received her high school diploma in 1965. She enrolled to study Arabic literature at the Beirut Arab University at age 40, but the Israeli occupation of the West Bank in 1967 prevented her from travelling for third-year exams.

== Career ==
The Arab Women's Union in al-Bireh, which had a sewing workshop, literacy centre, and kindergarten, was founded by Khalil in the 1950s. The Jam‘iyyat in‘ash al-usra, a social assistance and women empowerment organisation, was founded by Khalil in 1965, and she served as its president until her death. She was a founding member of the General Union of Palestinian Women in 1965.

Khalil provided aid to people following the Six-Day War and helped open 23 first aid centres. An organisation she founded raised 1,000 Jordanian dinars each month to support children in nursery school and families of martys. In 1969, Israel prohibited charitable organisation from raising more than 2,000 dinars per year.

Israeli authorities arrested Khalil six times for demonstrating and protesting; she was last arrested in 1976 on charges of being a member of the Palestine National Front in the Occupied Territories. During her 1976 imprisonment she was severely beaten by her four Israeli cellmates and transferred to a different cell with other Palestinians. She was placed under house arrest from 1980 to 1983, and banned from travelling from 1967 to 1973, and 1982 to 1991.

Khalil was a member of the Palestinian National Assembly in 1964, and this later produced the Palestine Liberation Organization. She was elected to the National Guidance Committee in 1978 and was the only female member. She was a member of the Palestinian National Council.

Khalil ran against Yasser Arafat in the 1996 presidential election, but lost. She believed that having Arafat run unopposed would create a negative image of democracy in Palestine.

== Personal life ==
Khalil's father was mayor of Anabta for 36 years, including during the Arab general strike and Arab revolt. Five of Khalil's cousins were killed during the revolt.

Khalil was also known as Um Khalil. She died in Ramallah on 26 February 1999. Samiha Khalil High School in Al-Bireh was named in her honour.

== Works cited ==
=== Journals ===
- Talhami, Ghada (1999). "In Memoriam: Samiha Khalil (1923-1999)". Arab Studies Quarterly. 21 (2). Pluto Journals: iii–iv. doi:10.2307/41858281. JSTOR 41858281.

=== Web ===
- "Samiha Al-Khalil". Jadaliyya. Archived from the original on 23 June 2025.
- "Samiha Khalil". Interactive Encyclopedia of the Palestine Question. Archived from the original on 16 June 2022.
- Mark, Clyde (12 November 2004). "Arafat's Succession". United States Department of Justice. Archived from the original on 3 November 2026.
