= Dalal Salameh =

Palestinian activist and politician (born 1965)

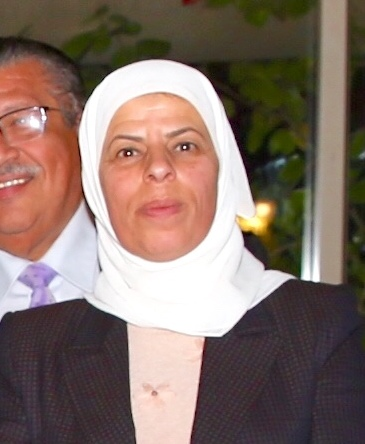

Member of the Palestinian Legislative Council
- In office 1996–2006
- Constituency: Nablus

Personal details
- Born: 4 October 1965 (age 61) Balata Camp, Jordan
- Party: Fatah

Dalal Abdul Hafith Salameh (Arabic: دلال عبد الحفيظ سلامة, born 4 October 1965; sometimes spelled Dalal Salama) is a Palestinian politician who served in the Palestinian Legislative Council (PLC) representing Nablus from 1996 to 2006, as a member of Fatah. She was one of the first women to serve in the PLC.

== Early life ==
Dalal Abdul Hafith Salameh was born in the Palestinian refugee camp Balata Camp. Her family fled from their village Tireet Dandan during the Nakba in 1948. She attended the UNRWA Balata Basic School for Girls. She graduated with a Bachelor of Arts degree in biology from An-Najah National University and a Master of Arts degree in international studies from Birzeit University. She was arrested by Israel for her activities at An-Najah National University.

== Career ==
Salameh joined Fatah in 1977, and is a member of its central committee. In the 1996 election she was elected to the Palestinian Legislative Council (PLC) representing Nablus. She was one of the first women to serve in the PLC and held her seat for ten years. She is the head of the General Union of Palestinian Women in Nablus.

The Association of Twin-City Committees between French Cities and Palestinian Refugee Camps was formed after the French Montataire and Palestinian Dheisheh became twin cities. The organisation sent a delegation, including Salameh, to France in 2000 to sign an additional nine agreements between France cities and Palestinian refugee camps.

Unity talks between fourteen Palestinian factions were held in Algiers in 2022, and Salameh was a member of Fatah's delegation.

The thirty-seventh government of Israel led by Benjamin Netanyahu supports the annexation of the West Bank. Salameh said in 2022 that tensions caused by this government could cause a new intifada.

== Works cited ==
=== Books ===
- Hamzeh, Muna (2001). Refugees in Our Own Land: Chronicles From a Palestinian Refugee Camp in Bethlehem. Pluto Press. ISBN 9780745316529.

=== News ===
- Lynfield, Ben (29 December 2022). "Israel swears in Benjamin Netanyahu amid concerns of further slide to right". The Guardian. Archived from the original on 3 November 2026.
- Toameh, Khaled (6 October 2022). "Algeria invites Fatah, Hamas to unity talks amid skepticism". The Jerusalem Post. Archived from the original on 3 November 2026.

=== Web ===
- "Dalal Salameh". European Council on Foreign Relations. Archived from the original on 3 November 2026.
- "West Bank Pioneers: Dalal Salameh". UNRWA. 19 March 2009. Archived from the original on 18 April 2016.
- Samaroo, Dima (2018). "The Political Participation of Palestinian Women in Official and Non-Official Organizations in Limited Horizon" (PDF). International Centre for the Study of Radicalisation and Political Violence. Archived (PDF) from the original on 3 November 2026.
