= Leigh-Anne: Race, Pop & Power =

2021 documentary film

- Genre: Documentary
- Directed by: Natasha Gaunt
- Starring: Leigh-Anne Pinnock; Keisha Buchanan; Alexandra Burke; Nao; Raye
- Country of origin: United Kingdom
- Original language: English

Production
- Executive producers: Tom Currie; Sam Bickley
- Producer: Kandise Abiola
- Editors: Dicky Everton; Paul Fallon
- Running time: 59 minutes
- Production company: Dragonfly Films

Original release
- Network: BBC Three
- Release: 13 May 2021

Leigh-Anne: Race, Pop & Power is a 2021 British documentary film directed by Natasha Gaunt that follows English singer Leigh-Anne Pinnock opening up about racial issues and colourism she experienced in her life and in the music industry. The documentary aired on BBC Three and BBC iPlayer on 13 May 2021. The documentary was filmed in 2020 after conversations about racism raised awareness following the murder of George Floyd and the Black Lives Matter movement. The documentary also shows Pinnock participating in protests in the UK against racial injustice and discussing the issue with fellow activists and artists including Alexandra Burke and Sugababes' Keisha Buchanan.

It was nominated for Best Authored Documentary at the 2021 National Television Awards. At the end of the documentary, Pinnock announced her charity, "The Black Fund", with her fiancé Andre Gray, which is made to support existing charities and groups who deliver support to the black community, including financial support.

== Synopsis ==
Leigh-Anne: Race, Pop & Power follows Leigh-Anne Pinnock as she opens up about her experiences of racism and colourism as a black woman in the UK and in the music industry, and confronts her struggles being the only black girl in Little Mix. The film focuses on how she can use her platform to combat profound racism happening in the world and how to make a change. After the news of George Floyd's murder and The Black Lives Matter movement, she aims to bring difficult conversations about black representation right to the top of the music industry, together with the global movement now standing with her. During a table discussion she speaks to other black and mixed-race pop celebrities including Alexandra Burke, Sugababes' Keisha Buchanan, Raye and Nao. Pinnock goes on to confront her fiancé, Andre Gray, about the series of offensive tweets he wrote in 2012, some of which are about black women. She tries to understand what led him as a younger man to think such abhorrent things.

At a local café shop, Pinnock meets up with Dawn Butler and seeks advice from her on how to handle this backlash, who herself has faced racial abuse throughout her career. Pinnock has a chat with co-band member, Jade Thirlwall, on confronting their label about this issue. She contacts three people from her label and discusses how whenever they do meetings and shoots with Little Mix, the staff and crew members are always predominantly white. She tries to convince them to work with more black creators. At the end of the documentary Pinnock and Gray announce that they will be launching a charity called "The Black Fund".

== Cast ==
- Leigh-Anne Pinnock, presenter
- Deborah Thornhill, mother
- John L. Pinnock, father
- Andre Gray, fiancé
- Sairah Pinnock, sister
- Jade Thirlwall, Little Mix band member
- Perrie Edwards, Little Mix band member
- Frank Gatson Jr., choreographer
- Alexandra Burke, musician
- Keisha Buchanan, musician
- Dawn Butler, politician
- Raye, musician
- Nao, musician
- The Trilly Trio, podcasters

Additionally, the archive footages used in the documentary features former Little Mix member Jesy Nelson.

== Background ==
On 5 June 2020, during the Black Lives Matter movement, Pinnock posted a video on her Instagram sharing her personal experiences of racism as a part of the music industry and how she felt "invisible" to her fans being the only black girl in the band. In her speech, she encouraged others to "continue to speak up on racism and keep this movement going".

On 12 August 2020, Pinnock announced on Instagram that she was releasing a documentary. The trailer for the documentary was released on 11 May 2021. It was later aired on BBC Three and was made available for streaming on BBC iPlayer on 13 May 2021. The documentary was filmed in 2020 and was directed by Natasha Gaunt. Some scenes from the documentary were filmed during the BLM protests in London.

The documentary was formerly titled Leigh-Anne: Colourism and Race but was later changed to Leigh-Anne: Race, Pop and Power upon release. Upon the announcement of the documentary, Pinnock received some negative reactions on social media, with many questioning if she was the right person to present the documentary.

To hear the comments was really hurtful because I started to question myself like, 'Am I the right person to do this? Have I taken someone else's place?' It was definitely hard seeing those comments and it hurt me more coming from the black community questioning whether I was the right person for this... After I questioned myself, I then thought, 'No,' because I am also talking about my experiences and I would rather use my platform that I have to reach millions of people than do nothing.

— Pinnock's response to people questioning if she was the right person to make the documentary.

At the end of the documentary, Pinnock and her fiancé Andre Gray expressed their intent in helping the black community by using their platforms, and announced that they will be launching a charity called "The Black Fund", which aims to support and empower Black communities by helping Black people get into the creative industries by channeling finances and other support to existing charities who deliver support to the black community as well. The charity was launched on 14 May 2021.

== Critical reception ==
Leigh-Anne: Race, Pop & Power was met with critical acclaim upon release. Pinnock was praised by fans for being vocal about racial injustice and for being honest about her experiences. Critics praised the documentary for its authenticity and insight. Rebecca Nicholson of The Guardian gave four out of five stars to the documentary, starting her review by saying is "a frank therapy session with the Little Mix star" and pointed out that she "liked this thoughtful, sensitive and determined documentary a lot. It seems to be aimed at a younger audience, but viewers who might see themselves as of post-Little Mix age will find it rich. It examines complicated questions without expecting easy answers and sees Pinnock turning her efforts to educate herself and others into a practical plan to find and employ more black creatives in the UK. "This is just the beginning", she says, and I don't doubt it for a second". Roisin O'Connor from The Independent also gave four out of five stars to the documentary, calling it "gripping and insightful" and express that "the message you take away from Race, Pop & Power depends on personal identity. As a white viewer, it's about the importance of being an ally, and of being aware that it is not enough simply to "not be racist". Progress, as Pinnock demonstrates so well, is achieved much faster when people work together".

New Statesman's Emily Bootle, after analysing the cultural influence of celebrities like Taylor Swift with Miss Americana and former Little Mix member Jesy Nelson with Odd One Out, wrote: "By the end of Race, Pop and Power, Pinnock has educated herself and her fans, pushed Sony to introduce diversity policies (despite the label's refusal to let her speak to somebody on screen), and set up her own foundation, The Black Fund, which aims to help black people enter the creative industries" and finished her review by pointing out that Pinnock "exposed many of the specific prejudices of the music industry – and pointed out the irony of the fact that it relies on black culture to function".

Katie Rosseinsky from Evening Standard, gave four out of five stars and mention that "so many music documentaries are so carefully stage managed that they become an extended branding exercise" but Race, Pop & Power "feels more authentic". Susannah Goldsbrough of The Telegraph gave three out of four stars to the documentary, after describing the documentary opined: "that very youthfulness and naivety also gives this documentary huge charm: Pinnock is honest, open, unabashed about looking uncertain or admitting her own mistakes. While the coronavirus conditions in which it was made deflate some elements of drama – I wonder whether in an ordinary world Pinnock might just have marched into a Sony office and demanded to say her piece, rather than sending an email – the sense of personal progression evoked gives it reasonable pace".

== Accolades ==
Year	Award ceremony	Category	Work	Result	Ref.
2021	National Television Awards	Best Authored Documentary	Leigh-Anne: Race, Pop & Power	Nominated	
2021	Ethnicity Awards	Media Progress Moment	Leigh-Anne: Race, Pop & Power	Won	
2021	I Talk Telly Awards	Best Documentary	Leigh-Anne: Race, Pop & Power	Won	
2022	Visionary Honours Awards	Documentary of the Year	Leigh-Anne: Race, Pop & Power	Won	

== See also ==
- List of television programmes broadcast by the BBC
