= Rawya Shawa =

Palestinian journalist and politician

Member of the Legislative Council
- In office 1996–2017
- Constituency: Gaza

Personal details
- Born: December 1944 Gaza City, Mandatory Palestine
- Died: 3 July 2017 (aged 72) Gaza City

Rawya Rashad Said al-Shawa (Arabic: راوية الشوا, December 1944 – 3 July 2017) was a Palestinian journalist and politician. She was one of the first group of women elected to the Legislative Council in 1996.

== Biography ==
Shawa was born in the Shuja'iyya neighbourhood of Gaza City in December 1944 to a Lebanese mother and Palestinian father. Her father Rashad was mayor of Gaza from 1972 to 1982. She married Aoun Saadi al-Shawa (who succeeded her father as mayor), with whom she had four children. Having graduated with a literature degree from the American University in Cairo in 1964, she worked as a journalist for the al-Nahar al-Maqdasiya and al-Quds newspapers.

In the 1996 elections to the Legislative Council, she ran as an independent candidate in Gaza, and was one of five women elected, becoming the first female Palestinian MPs. She was re-elected in 2006 on the Independent Palestine list.

She died in al-Shifa Hospital in Gaza on 3 July 2017.
