= Malak Mattar =

Palestinian painter and author (born 1999)

- ملك مطر
- Born: December 17, 1999 (age 26)
- Education: Istanbul Aydın University

Malak Mattar (Arabic: ملك مطر; born 17 December 1999) is a Palestinian painter, illustrator, and author of children's books. She is from Gaza.

== Early life and education ==
Mattar was raised in Gaza City. Her father's family is from Ashkelon, and he is a former member of the Palestinian foreign service; her mother is from al-Batani al-Sharqi and works as a UNRWA English teacher. Mattar attended UNRWA schools until ninth grade.

Mattar was given the chance to study abroad for college, after graduating high school in 2017 with the second-highest GPA in Palestine. She attended university at Istanbul Aydin University in Turkey, where she studied political science and international relations. She lived with an older sister who was also studying in Istanbul. Mattar began studying at Central St Martins in September 2023 for her master's degree. Her family evacuated from the Gaza Strip by April 2024.

== Art work ==
Mattar began painting in 2014, during the 2014 Gaza War, as a way to express her emotions and work through her trauma. She first began with using watercolors on basic paper, but her mother bought her acrylic paint and canvases after seeing her passion for art. She received mentorship from her uncle, Mohammed Musallam, a fellow painter from Gaza.

Mattar started an Instagram account, where she posted her art. Her work started to gain traction, and by age 14 she had her first gallery opening in Gaza, and was selling her work to online buyers.

In 2016, Mattar's art was exhibited at the Palestine Museum in Bristol, but she was unable to attend as she was not granted a visa. In 2019, Mattar's art was exhibited at the Palestine Museum in Connecticut. In August, some of her work was brought to Gallery al-Quds in Washington D.C.

In 2021 Mattar wrote and illustrated a children's book called, Grandma's Bird.

As of 2022, Mattar's artwork had been shown in 80 countries. She had a solo exhibition of her work at Garden Court Chambers in London from 30 June 2023 for six months, becoming the first Palestinian artist whose work was exhibited at the institution. One of her paintings at the exhibition was the portrait of Yusra Al Barbari, a Palestinian activist.

Mattar has continued to use painting to express her emotions during the Gaza war, but painting has become "painful" rather than cathartic.

In January 2024, Mattar began work on a more than two-meter-tall painting entitled "Last Breath," (later renamed "No Words") which she competed the following month. The painting has drawn comparisons to Picasso's Guernica. She made more than 100 compositional sketches for the piece.

In April 2024, Mattar held a solo exhibition titled "The Horse Fell off the Poem" at the Ferruzzi Gallery in Venice, coinciding with the opening of the 60th Venice Biennale. The show was organized in collaboration with Dyala Nusseibeh, director of Abu Dhabi Art. It featured "No Words" and seven smaller charcoal drawings depicting scenes from the then ongoing conflict in Gaza. The show's title was a reference to a poem by the Palestinian poet Mahmoud Darwish.

In May 2024, another exhibition of Mattar's work, "Screams", opened in Scotland. The exhibit featured more than 100 new pieces which Mattar had created in response to the Gaza war.

In September 2025, Mattar was the artistic director for the Together for Palestine fundraiser concert curated by Brian Eno at Wembley Stadium that raised at least £1.5m.

=== Style ===
Mattar has said she tries to focus on bright colors and positive subject matter - like hope and peace - in her work. Her style, which has been described as expressionist, has been compared to that of Picasso and Matisse. She has also cited Frida Kahlo as an inspiration.

Mattar tends to depict women in her work. She has attributed this to the sex-segregated nature of Gazan society, and the strong presence of her mother and grandmothers in her life. Some of her figures have halos, which were inspired by a trip Mattar took to Roman Catholic Holy Family Church in Gaza and are a way of imbuing the figures with "spiritual strength and power".

Mattar is also been drawn to painting birds, as symbols of freedom and, when caged, of imprisonment. The dove in particular is a common symbol in her paintings. Other Palestinian symbols in Mattar's work include oranges, olives, and pomegranates.

Since the beginning of the Gaza war in October 2023, Mattar has worked primarily in white, black, and grays, depicting images of destruction and death in the Gaza Strip.
