= Yusra Al Barbari =

Palestinian teacher and activist (1923–2009)

- Born: 15 April 1923; Gaza City, Mandate Palestine
- Died: 13 May 2009 (aged 86); Gaza City, Palestine
- Burial place: Martyrs Cemetery, Gaza City
- Education: Fuad I University
- Occupation: Teacher

Yusra Al Barbari (1923–2009) was a Palestinian teacher and activist who was a member of the Palestine National Council and of the Palestine Liberation Organization (PLO).

== Early life and education ==
Al Barbari was born in Gaza City on 15 April 1923. She hailed from a Muslim family. Her parents were Ibrahim Al Barbari, a merchant, and Labiba Mahmud Halawah, and she had two brothers and sisters.

Al Barbari graduated from the Schmidt's Girls College in Jerusalem and received a degree in history from Fuad I University (precursor of Cairo University) in 1949 being the first female university graduate from Gaza City. During her studies at high school and university Al Barbari participated in demonstrations against the British rulers of Palestine supporting the invalidation of the Balfour Declaration and ending of the Jewish immigration to the region.

== Career and activities ==
Following her graduation Al Barbari worked as a teacher in Gaza which was under Egyptian administration. Then she served as an inspector at girls' schools and developed an educational program for female teacher training. Based on this program the Women Teachers Institute was established in Gaza. She also served as the president of the Open University for Women in the Gaza Strip.

Al Barbari continued to participate in demonstrations against Israel in the 1950s. She was part of the first Palestinian delegation to visit the United Nations along with Haidar Abdel-Shafi and Ibrahim Abu Sitta in 1963. Al Barbari was elected as a member of the first Palestine National Council organized in Jerusalem in May 1964 during which the PLO was formed. The same year she was involved in the establishment of the Women's Union of Gaza and became its president. The Union took part in the conference which established the General Union of Palestinian Women in Jerusalem in 1965. She served in the delegations of the Federation of Women's Voluntary Societies in 1991.

Al Barbari was elected as the executive secretary of the Gaza Red Crescent Society in 1973 and later, served as a member of its board of directors. She also served as a member of the Veterans' Society and the Society for the Disabled in the Gaza Strip.

Israel banned Al Barbari's travels due to her political activities in the 1970s. She was among the signatories of a document dated September 1977 calling for the foundation of a Palestinian state under the authority of the PLO.

== Personal life and death ==
Al Barbari spoke fluently Arabic, English, and French.

Al Barbari died in Gaza City on 13 May 2009 and was buried in the Martyrs Cemetery in Gaza City. She was posthumously awarded the Star of Jerusalem Medal by the General Union of Palestinian Women on 21 May 2009.

=== Legacy ===
Al Barbari was featured along with four other Palestinian women in a 1991 documentary entitled L’espoir voilé (French: The Veiled Hope) directed by Norma Marcos. Al Barbari's portrait was one of the paintings in the six-month solo exhibition of the Palestinian artist Malak Mattar at the Garden Court Chambers, London, in 2023.
