= Salwa Abu Khadra =

Palestinian politician and educator (1929–2024)

Personal details
- Born: 1929 Jaffa, Mandatory Palestine
- Died: 15 November 2024 (aged 95)
- Party: Fatah
- Education: University of Oxford; Saint Joseph University

Salwa Abu Khadra (1929 – 15 November 2024) was a Palestinian politician and educator who was a member of the Palestine Liberation Organization (PLO) and Fatah, where she held various posts. She was part of the first generation women leaders of both groups.

== Biography ==
Abu Khadra was born in Jaffa in 1929. Her family is from Gaza. In 1948 they had to leave Jaffa and settled in Damascus.

Abu Khadra completed her secondary education at Saint Joseph Sisters School in Jaffa in 1945. She obtained a certificate in education from the University of Oxford in 1947 and a degree in French literature from Saint Joseph University in 1952. Later she settled in Kuwait and played a significant role in the education of Palestinian girls. She established the first nursery school in Kuwait. She also founded a private school in Kuwait where she worked until 1990. She left Kuwait due to the Gulf War in 1991 and settled in Egypt where her daughter had been living.

Abu Khadra's political career began when she joined Fatah in 1965. The same year she took part in the establishment of Palestinian women council. In 1967 she became a board member of the General Union of Palestinian Women. She was a member of the Palestinian Higher Council for Culture, Science and Education from 1976, and a member of the revolutionary council of Fatah from 1980. She also served as a member of the PLO's central committee. She was elected as the secretary general of the General Union of Palestinian Women in May 1985. She was also the secretary general of the women bureau of Fatah and served as a member of the Consultative Committee of the Palestinian Constitution. Abu Khadra headed the Palestinian delegation at the second conference on women of the United Nations in 1980.

Abu Khadra died on 15 November 2024, at the age of 95.
