= Issam Abdulhadi =

Palestinian women's rights activist (1928-2013)

- Born: 1928; Nablus, Mandatory Palestine
- Died: August 16, 2013 (aged 84–85); Amman, Jordan
- Occupation: Women's rights activist
- Known for: President of the General Union of Palestinian Women
- Children: Faiha Abdul Hadi
- Awards: Ibn Rushd Prize for Freedom of Thought (2001)

Issam Abdulhadi (1928–16 August 2013) was an award-winning Palestinian women’s rights activist. She was elected as the President of the General Union of Palestinian Women in July 1965.

== Early life ==
Born in Nablus in 1928, she was educated at A’ishiyyeh School and later at the Friends’ School in Ramallah.

== Career ==
Abdulhadi began her career in Palestinian women’s activities in the West Bank in 1949. She attended the first Palestinian National Council at which the General Union of Palestinian Women was formally established in June 1964. In 1949 she was elected Secretary-General of the Arab Women’s Union in Nablus. By July 1965 she was elected as the President of the General Union of Palestinian Women.

=== Imprisonment ===
In April 1969 Abdulhadi was imprisoned by Israeli forces and then deported with her daughter, Faiha Abdul Hadi, after arranging a sit-in and hunger strike at the Church of the Holy Sepulchre, in Jerusalem, where she had been protesting the Israeli army’s killing of women in Gaza.

=== In exile ===
Abdulhadi worked through the Save Jerusalem Committee in Amman, Jordan. By 1974 she was appointed to the Palestinian Central Council, and then she re-established General Union of Palestinian Women in Lebanon. She then headed the Palestinian delegation to the first World Conference on Women in Mexico City in 1975.

By 1981 she was elected President of the General Union of Arab Women, followed by Vice-President of the International Democratic Union of Women from 1981–92.

She was allowed to return to the West Bank in 1993, alongside 30 other leaders.

== Awards ==
Abdulhadi was awarded the Ibn Rushd Prize for Freedom of Thought in 2001 and was one of eight Palestinian women nominated for the Nobel Peace Prize as part of the Project "1000 Women for the Nobel Peace Prize 2005".

== Personal life ==
Abdulhadi married at the age of nineteen.

She died in Amman, Jordan, on 16 August 2013.
