= No Hard Feelings (EP) =

EP by Leigh-Anne
- Released: 31 May 2024
- Genre: R&B
- Length: 12:28
- Label: Warner
- Producer: Ian Kirkpatrick; The Runners; Albert Hype; Danja; Prgrshn; Khris Riddick-Tynes; Di Genius; Supa Dups

Leigh-Anne chronology
| No Hard Feelings (2024) | My Ego Told Me To (2026) |

Singles from No Hard Feelings
- 1. "Stealin' Love" Released: 28 March 2024; 2. "Forbidden Fruit" Released: 3 May 2024; 3. "OMG" Released: 31 May 2024

No Hard Feelings is the debut extended play by English singer Leigh-Anne. It was released through Warner Records on 31 May 2024. The EP consists of five tracks, and was supported by the release of the singles "Stealin' Love" and "Forbidden Fruit". It is lyrically inspired by her life experiences and musically incorporates roots of her Barbadian and Jamaican ancestry.

On 11 June 2024, Leigh-Anne announced that the EP was extended with the bonus track "Nature" which was released on 12 June 2024. It reached the top forty on the Scottish Albums Chart and UK Albums Sales Chart.

== Background ==
In March 2024, Leigh-Anne announced the release of a music project, that was separate from that of her debut album. In April, an official website titled "No Hard Feelings" confirmed the name of her upcoming EP, which was also created for fans to discover more about the upcoming project. On 22 May 2024, she announced that the release date and it was released on 31 May 2024.

Speaking about the project, she shared: “I created this EP for my fans to feel closer to me and to give everyone a better understanding of the solo artist I want to be. Each track reflects a different mood, so no matter how you’re feeling, there’s something here for you. It’s honest, personal and I’m so excited that now it’s all yours.”

== Lyrics and themes ==
The EP was inspired by Leigh-Anne's own personal experiences and details the highs and lows of her relationship. It lyrically touches on the subjects of various themes including romance, sexuality, and relationships, while musically is influenced by her Barbadian and Jamaican heritage.

== Singles ==
On 28 March 2024, "Stealin' Love" was announced as the lead single to be released from the EP. It was described by NME as "a tight, R&B-flavoured electro-pop song", while Official Charts Company described it as "smooth, nostalgic R&B". On 26 April 2024, "Forbidden Fruit" was released as the second single on 3 May 2024. Clash described it as "Leigh-Anne dipping into her long-held passion for reggae music", which addresses her relationship with real life husband Andre Gray, and how they met. It was co written in Miami by Leigh-Anne alongside J Kash and Nija Charles while production was handled by Albert Hype. "OMG" was released as the third single on Italian radio, along with the release of the EP.

== Track listing ==
No Hard Feelings track listing
| No. | Title | Lyrics | Music | Producer(s) | Length |
|---|---|---|---|---|---|
| 1. | "Stealin' Love" | Leigh-Anne Pinnock; Sam Roman | Jermaine Jackson; Ian Kirkpatrick; Philip Plested | Kirkpatrick; The Runners; J Warner^{[v]}; Kuk Harrell^{[v]} | 2:20 |
| 2. | "Forbidden Fruit" | Pinnock; Jacob Hindlin; Nija Charles | Alberto Carlos Melendez | Albert Hype; Warner^{[v]} | 2:22 |
| 3. | "OMG" | Abby Keen; Dayo Olatunji; Pinnock | Floyd Nathaniel Hills; Warner^{[v]}; Ras Kassa Alexander | Danja; Prgrshn | 2:13 |
| 4. | "Anticipate" | Pinnock; Taylor Parks | Parx; Tynes | Khris Riddick-Tynes; Albin Tengblad; Gustav Landell; Parx^{[a]} | 2:22 |
| 5. | "I'll Still Be Here" | Keen; Olatunji; Pinnock | Alexander; Warner^{[v]} | Prgrshn | 3:11 |
| Total length: | | | | | 12:28 |

No Hard Feelings bonus track listing
| No. | Title | Lyrics | Music | Producer(s) | Length |
|---|---|---|---|---|---|
| 6. | "Nature" | Liana Banks; Toian; Pinnock | Pinnock | Di Genius; Supa Dups; Warner^{[v]} | 2:46 |
| Total length: | | | | | 14:04 |

Notes

- ^{^[a]} signifies an additional producer
- ^{^[v]} signifies a vocal producer

== Personnel ==
Musicians

- Leigh-Anne – lead vocals
- Ian Kirkpatrick – programming on "Stealin' Love"
- The Runners – programming on "Stealin' Love"
- Albert Hype – bass, drums, guitar, and synthesizer on "Forbidden Fruit"
- Mont Jake – additional programming on "Forbidden Fruit"
- Prgrshn – programming on "OMG" and "I'll Still Be Here"
- Danja – drums and programming on "OMG"
- Khris Riddick-Tynes – programming on "Anticipate"
- Jack Shepherd – additional guitar on "I'll Still Be Here"
- Dyo – additional vocals on "I'll Still Be Here"
- Di Genius – bass, guitar, and keyboards on "Nature"
- Supa Dups – drum programming on "Nature"

Technical

- Jay Reynolds – mastering, mixing on all tracks except "I'll Still Be Here"
- Prgrshn – mixing on "I'll Still Be Here"
- J Warner – engineering on "Stealin' Love" and "Forbidden Fruit"
- J Kash – engineering on "Forbidden Fruit"
- Marcella Araica – engineering on "OMG"
- Khris Riddick-Tynes – engineering on "Anticipate"
- Tayla Parks – vocal arrangement on "Anticipate"
- Di Genius – arrangement on "Nature"
- Supa Dups – arrangement on "Nature"

== Charts ==
Chart performance for No Hard Feelings
| Chart (2025) | Peak position |
|---|---|
| Scottish Albums (OCC) | 35 |
| UK Albums Sales (OCC) | 38 |

== Release history ==
Release dates and formats for "No Hard Feelings"
| Region | Date | Format | Edition | Label | Ref. |
|---|---|---|---|---|---|
| Various | 31 May 2024 | Digital download; streaming | Standard | Warner | |
| Various | 12 June 2025 | Digital download; streaming | Bonus | Warner | |
| Various | 30 May 2025 | Vinyl | Bonus | Warner | |
