= 1996 Palestinian general election =

- 20 January 1996
- Presidential election
- Turnout: 71.66%
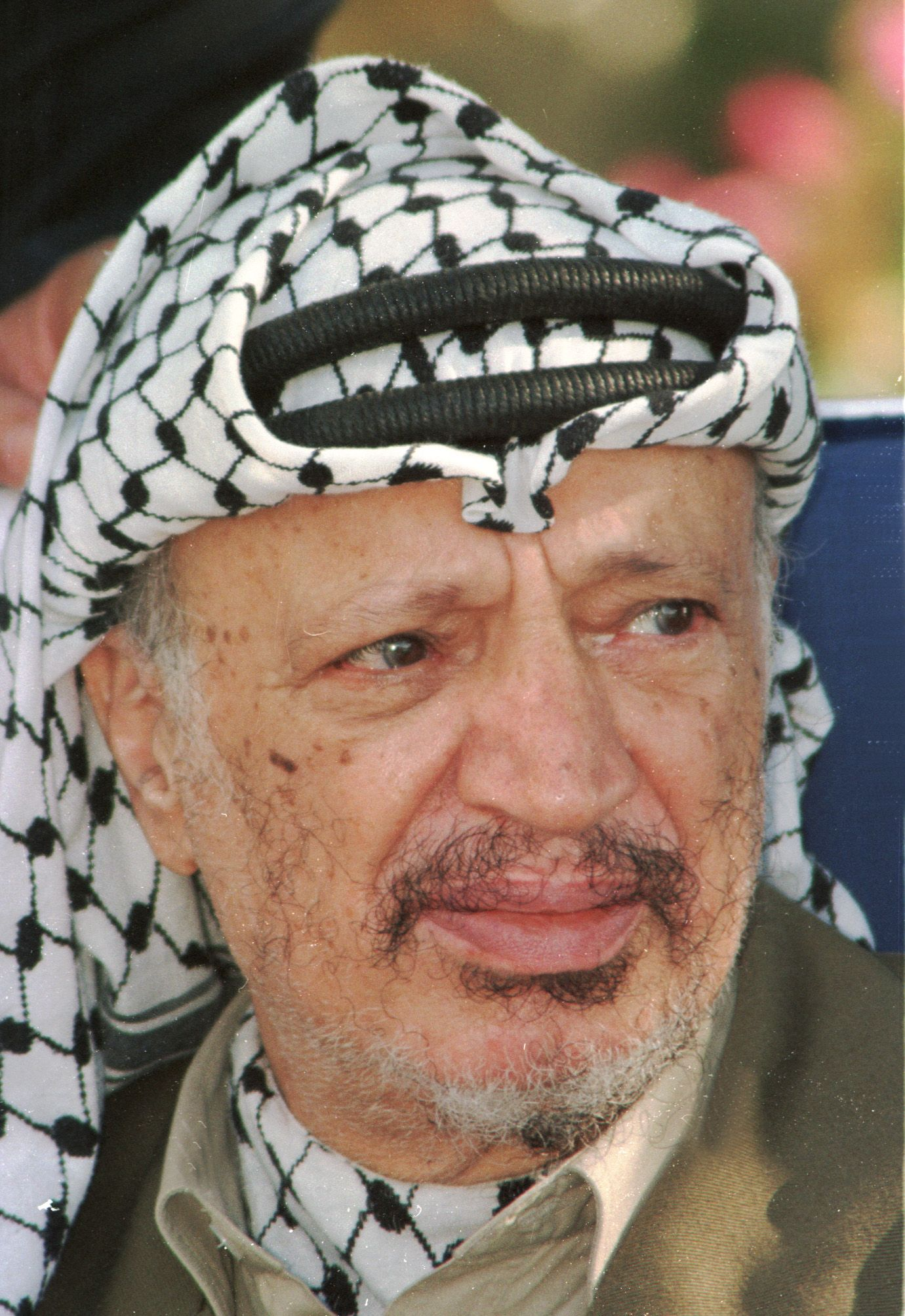

Candidate	Yasser Arafat	Samiha Khalil
Party	Fatah	DFLP
Popular vote	643,079	72,887
Percentage	89.82%	10.18%
- Results by governorate: Arafat: 75–80% 80-85% 85–90% 90–95% 95–100%
President before election
Yasser Arafat
Fatah
President-elect
Yasser Arafat
Fatah
- Parliamentary election
- All 88 seats in the Palestinian Legislative Council; 45 seats needed for a majority
Party	Leader	Vote %	Seats
Fatah	Yasser Arafat	30.90	50
NDC		2.25	1
FIDA	Yasser Abed Rabbo	2.04	1
LIB		1.64	1
Independents	–	57.51	35
This lists parties that won seats. See the complete results below.
Results by governorate:
Fatah: 10-20% 20-30% 30-40% 40-50% 60-70%

General elections were held for the first time in the Palestinian territories on 20 January 1996 to elect the President of the Palestinian National Authority (PNA) and members of the Palestinian Legislative Council (PLC), the legislative arm of the PNA. They took place in the West Bank, the Gaza Strip, and East Jerusalem. A new government was formed following the elections, headed by President Yasser Arafat.

== Background ==
There were no strong conventional political parties in place before the election. The results were dominated by Fatah, the strongest movement within the Palestine Liberation Organization, which was headed by Yasser Arafat. The Islamist Hamas, Fatah's main rival, refused to participate in the election; they felt that doing so would lend legitimacy to the PNA, which was created out of what they called unacceptable negotiations and compromises with Israel. Independent international observers reported the elections to have been free and fair; however, boycotts by Hamas and opposition movements limited voter choices.

== Opinion polls ==
=== Presidential ===
Date	Pollster	Sample size	Arafat Fatah	Ahmed Yassin Hamas	George Habash PFLP	Haidar Abdel-Shafi	Faisal Husseni	Hanan Ashrawi	Nabil Shaath Fatah	Mahmoud al-Zahar Hamas	Others	No opinion	Against all
11 - 21 January 1996	JMCC	1,199	41%	3.2%	0.9%	7.2%	1.3%	3%	1%	1%	13.2%	16.8%	11.4%
6 - 7 October 1995	JMCC	1,318	36.8%	5.5%	3.4%	4.6%	2.1%	2.4%	0.9%	0.2%	10.3%	17.7%	16.1%

=== Legislative ===
Date	Pollster	Sample size	Fatah	Hamas	PFLP	Islamic Jihad Movement	PPP	FIDA	DFLP	PLO	Other Islamic parties	Others	No opinion	Against all
11 - 21 January 1996	JMCC	1,199	38.9%	12.3%	2.3%	1.4%	1.8%	0.9%	0.6%	-	1.9%	1%	21.8%	17.1%
6 - 7 October 1995	JMCC	1,318	41.3%	10.7%	3.6%	2.4%	1%	0.5%	0.5%	0.2%	0.9%	-	17.8%	20.9%

== Conduct ==
Despite considerable Israeli obstruction, the PCBS was able to arrange the necessary voter registration. Obstructions included long delays in providing maps and necessary information, and insistence on Hebrew-only documents; in Gaza, six tons of voter registration cards were held up at the Erez crossing, and eventually they had to be "passed by hand over the concrete barriers that surround the checkpoint".

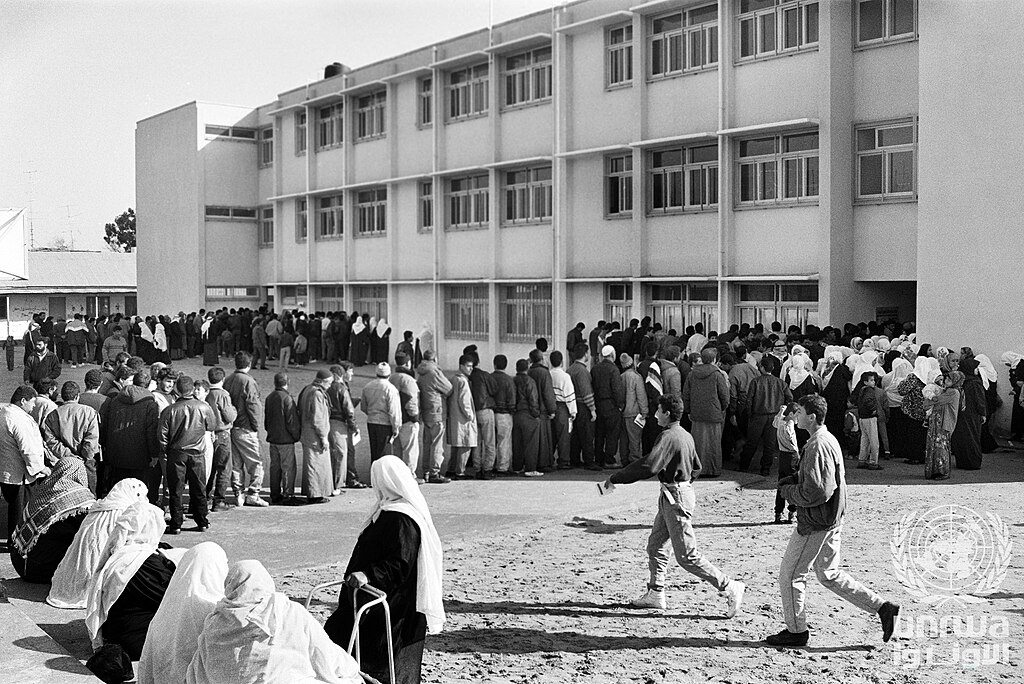
Palestinians waiting in line to cast their vote.

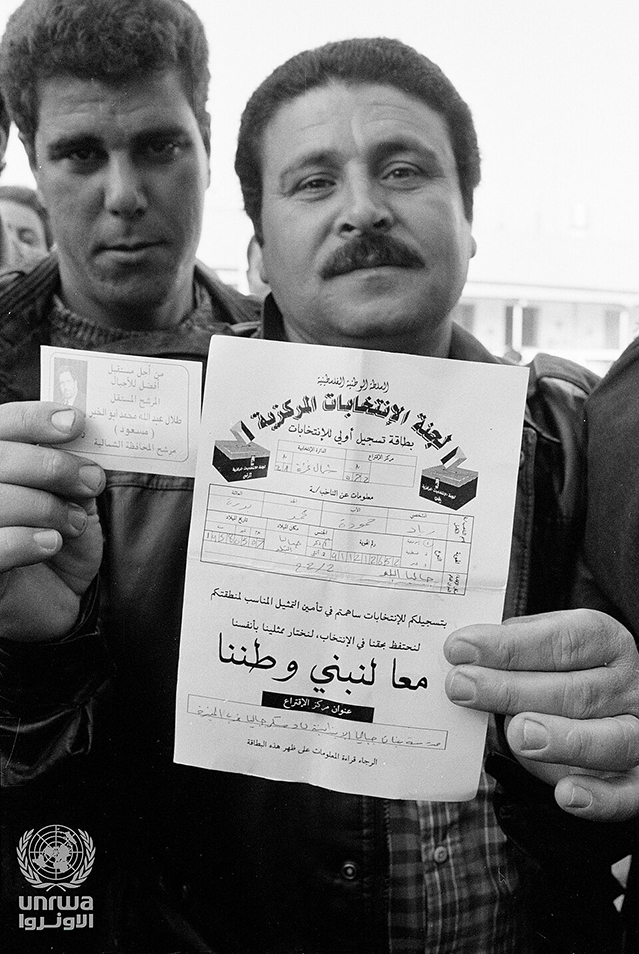
A member of the election committee in the Gaza Strip.

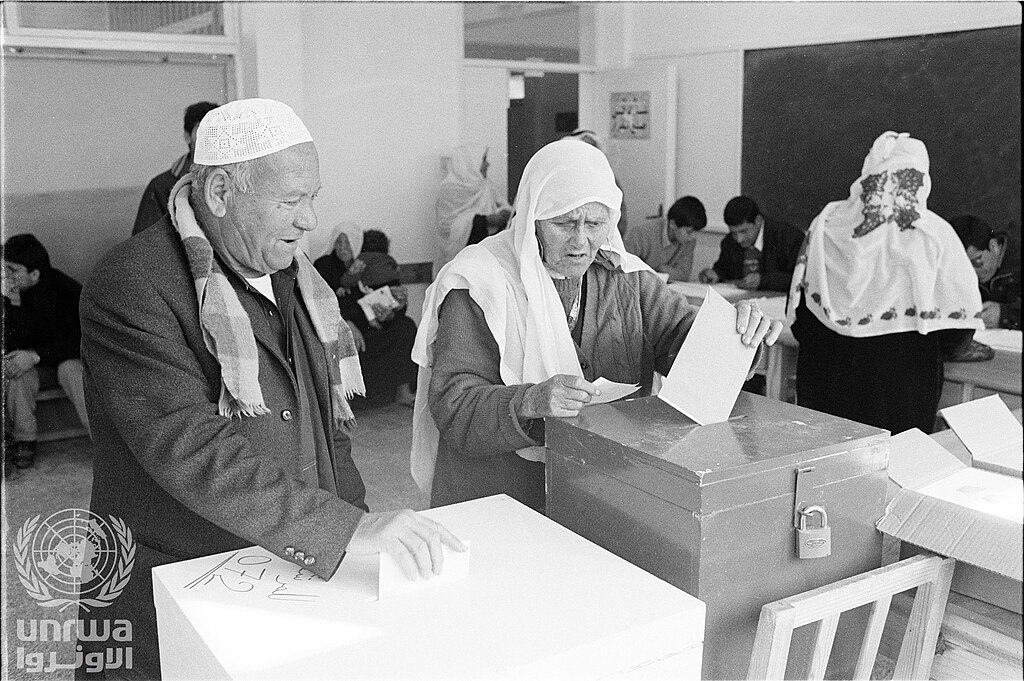
People voting.

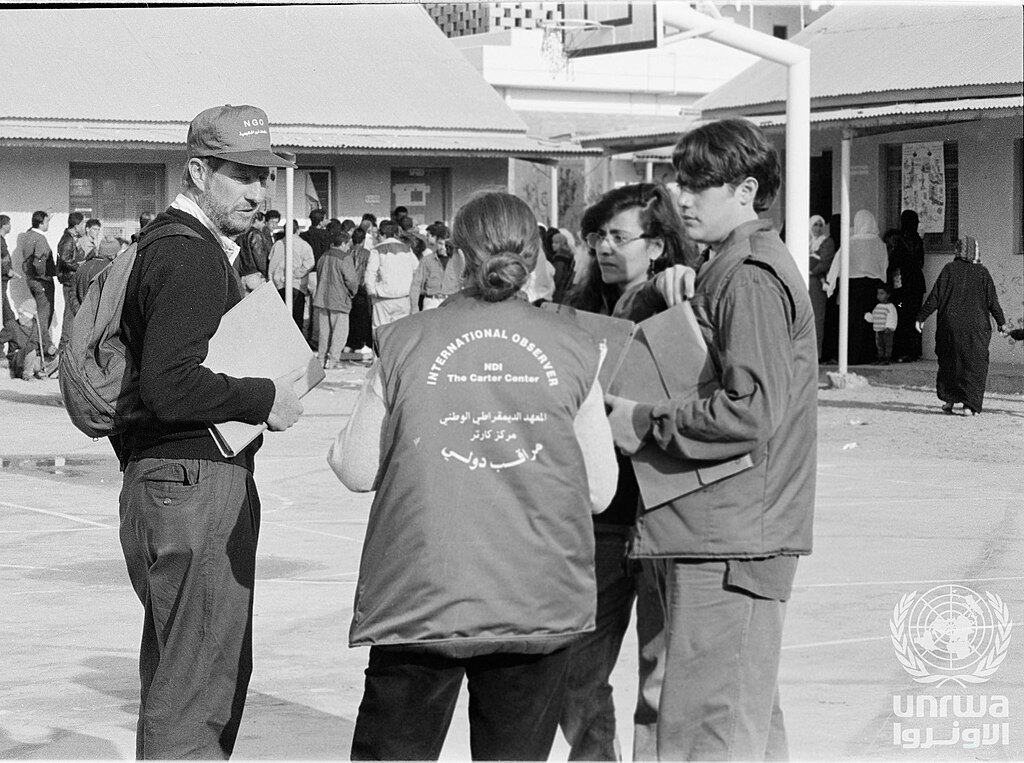
International observers at an election post in the Gaza Strip.

== Results ==
=== President ===
The president was elected by a simple popular vote. The results of the election were considered a foregone conclusion by most observers, due to Arafat's longtime dominance of the Palestinian political scene (he had been PNA president since its creation and head of the PLO for decades before that) and the high regard he was held in by most Palestinians. His only opponent, female politician Samiha Khalil, was largely considered a prop. Arafat won the election with 88.2 percent of the vote to Khalil's 11.5 percent.

Candidate	Party	Votes	%
Yasser Arafat	Fatah	643,079	89.82
Samiha Khalil	Democratic Front for the Liberation of Palestine	72,887	10.18
Total		715,966	100.00
Valid votes		715,966	97.17
Invalid/blank votes		20,859	2.83
Total votes		736,825	100.00
Registered voters/turnout		1,028,280	71.66
Source: JMCC

=== Legislative Council ===
The legislative election saw 88 PLC members elected from multi-member constituencies, with the number of representatives from each constituency determined by population. 51 seats were allocated to the West Bank and 37 to the Gaza Strip. Some seats were set aside for the Christian and Samaritan communities. Of the 25 female candidates, five won seats; Hanan Ashrawi, Dalal Salameh, Jamila Saidam, Rawya Shawa and Intissar al-Wazir.

Party	Votes	%	Seats
Fatah	1,085,593	30.90	50
Palestinian People's Party	102,830	2.93	0
National Democratic Coalition	79,058	2.25	1
Palestinian Democratic Union	71,672	2.04	1
Liberty & Independence Bloc	57,516	1.64	1
Palestinian Popular Struggle Front	26,034	0.74	0
Arab Liberation Front	22,810	0.65	0
Islamic Struggle Movement	12,285	0.35	0
Islamic Jihad Movement	8,391	0.24	0
National Democratic Movement	6,831	0.19	0
Future Bloc	6,584	0.19	0
Palestinian Liberation Front	3,919	0.11	0
National Movement for Change	2,658	0.08	0
Palestinian National Coalition	2,635	0.08	0
Ba'ath Party	2,230	0.06	0
Progressive National Bloc	1,707	0.05	0
Independents	2,020,213	57.51	35
Total	3,512,966	100.00	88
Registered voters/turnout	1,028,280	–	
Source: JMCC

== Analysis ==
Elections in the OPT are held to exercise the Palestinian right to self-determination in connection with their right to establish their own state, but are held within the context of the Israeli occupation. They are held in the framework of the Oslo Accords, meaning that the power of the PNA was (and is) limited to matters such as culture, education, ID cards and the distribution of the land and water.

A controversial claim has been made, that changes of the political reality, including elections and the formation of new political entities under occupation are, like the Oslo Accords themselves, contrary to the Geneva Conventions and thus illegal. This argument is generally not accepted, as the Accords were meant as a temporary stepping stone to Palestinian self-determination. Some view elections in the Palestinian Territories as little more than symbolic, given the limited power they grant.

Political freedom is limited in the Palestinian Territories; checkpoints and separation walls are already fit to hinder all social activities. The parliament cannot function, merely because free travel is not possible, especially between Gaza and West Bank. In addition to this, hostilities between Fatah and Hamas hinder the correct functioning of the parliament.

Moreover, PNA and parliament do not represent the Palestinian diaspora (to which the PLO is entitled).

=== Gender ===
A poll conducted on 19 April 1994 by the Palestinian Center for Policy and Survey Research with 2006 respondents found the majority of Palestinians (79%) supported the right of women to vote (86% of women and 76% of men). 63% (71% of women and 59% of men) showed a willingness to vote for a female candidate who was competent, while 21% (24% of men and 16% of women) indicated they would not vote for a woman because "a man is probably more qualified" and 11% (13% of men and 7% of women) said they did not support women running for elections. Prior to the elections there were discussions of establishing a 30 percent electoral quota to ensure female representation, similar to the quota for Christians, though no quota was put in place. According to one poll 50% of the Palestinian public favored a quota for women.

Of the 550 candidates, 28 (5%) were women. Five women were elected to the council (6% of 88 seats), two from the West Bank and three from Gaza. These were Hanan Ashrawi (Jerusalem, independent), Dalal Salameh (Nablus, Fatah), journalist Rawya Shawa (Gaza, independent), Jamila Saidam (Khan Younis, Fatah), and Intissar al-Wazir. A sixth candidate, Zahira Kamal (Jerusalem, Fida), lost by 104 votes out of 32,316 cast in the Jerusalem constituency.

== Aftermath ==
The 1996 elections took place in a moment of optimism in the Israeli–Palestinian peace process; many Palestinians believed that the government they were electing would be the first of an independent Palestinian state. In the ensuing months and years however, Israelis and Palestinians failed to resolve their differences and come to a final status agreement; an upswing in violence meant that the Israeli–Palestinian conflict would continue. As a result of this instability, new elections were not held until nearly a decade later.
