= Been a Minute (Leigh-Anne Pinnock song) =

Single by Leigh-Anne

from the album My Ego Told Me To
- Released: 18 July 2025
- Length: 3:20
- Label: Virgin Music
- Composers: Anastas Hackett; Chazara Odom; Elijah Ross; J Warner; Lasse Qvist; Leigh-Anne Pinnock
- Lyricists: Odom; Ross; Warner; Pinnock
- Producers: Ross; Lasse "Loud x Two" Qvist

Leigh-Anne singles chronology
| "OMG" (2024) | "Been a Minute" (2025) | "Burning Up" (2025) |

Music video
- "Been a Minute" on YouTube

"Been a Minute" is a song by English singer Leigh-Anne. It was released on 18 July 2025, through Virgin Music Group, and is her first release as an independent artist following her departure from Warner Records. It serves as the lead single from her first solo album, My Ego Told Me To.

== Background and release ==
In May 2025, Pinnock revealed she had departed Warner Records, after her signing was announced in February 2022. At the same time, she revealed via a voice note on her Discord channel, she had signed with Virgin Music Group as an independent artist. Two months later, she announced the release of the song, alongside the single artwork.

== Composition ==
Official Charts Company's Carl Smith noted the song's sampling of Masters at Work's 2001 song, "Work".

== Music video ==
An accompanying music video for "Been a Minute", directed by Femi Lade, was released on the same day as the single's release. Inspired by Leigh-Anne's heritage, the video borrows influence from Caribbean Carnivals. Speaking to Rolling Stone UK about the video, she explained: "It's been the most freeing experience watching my vision come to life. For the 'Been a Minute' music video I wanted to create a space where everyone feels like they can be themselves unapologetically."

== Reception ==
Ahead of its release, Smith reviewed the song, declaring that it had summer "written all over it."

== Personnel ==
=== Musicians ===
Adapted via Tidal.

- Dale Becker – mastering engineer
- Denise Belfon – background vocals
- Adam Burt – assistant mastering engineer
- Jon Castelli – mixing engineer
- Anastas Hackett – composer
- Katie Harvey – assistant mastering engineer
- Brad Lauchert – assistant mixing engineer
- Chazara Odom – composer, writer
- Leigh-Anne Pinnock – composer, vocals, writer
- Lasse "Loud x Two" Qvist – composer, drums, producer, programmer
- Elijah Ross – composer, drums, producer, programmer, writer
- J Warner – composer, writer

== Charts ==
Chart performance for "Been a Minute"
| Chart (2025) | Peak position |
|---|---|
| Malta Airplay (Radiomonitor) | 20 |
| UK Singles Sales (OCC) | 31 |

== Release history ==
"Been a Minute" release history
| Region | Date | Format | Label | Ref. |
|---|---|---|---|---|
| Various | 18 July 2025 | Digital download; streaming | Virgin Music | |
