= Amsterdam Andalusian Orchestra =

Dutch musical orchestra (founded 2011)

The Amsterdam Andalusian Orchestra (AAO) (Dutch: Amsterdams Andalusisch Orkest) is an orchestra in the Netherlands specialising in Arab-Andalusian music. It was founded in 2011 by a group of friends in Amsterdam, with the aim of sharing the musical heritage of Al-Andalus. The AAO has also performed other genres, such as classical Arabic music, jazz and flamenco.

For their contribution to diverse musical and regional traditions in their country, the AAO was awarded the prestigious Dutch Cultuurfonds Prize in 2024.

== History ==
The Amsterdam Andalusian Orchestra was founded in 2011 by Mohamed Chairi, Yassine Boussaid, Dwight Breinburg and Mohamed Aadroun. Aadroun, a business manager born in Amsterdam to Moroccan parents, had developed a strong interest in the history and musical traditions of al-Andalus. Using his creative skills in video design and visual storytelling, he started writing scripts for stage productions that blend theater, historical narratives and live music.

The AAO seeks to bridge musical traditions originating in historical Al-Andalus and still performed today in the Maghreb countries with contemporary cultural life in the Netherlands. The artistic vision of the orchestra is characterised by its multidisciplinary approach, encompassing poetry, dance, photography, and performances of varying artistic groups. In line with its commitment to diversity and inclusivity, the AAO provides Andalusian music workshops to young people from a variety of ethnic and cultural backgrounds, including Dutch, Moroccan, and other ethnic groups.

The AAO performs a diverse repertoire which spans from Granada to Baghdad, covering different periods. Their choice of music is characterised by a variety of styles and traditions, drawing from both historical and geographical influences. The rich Arabo-Andalusian tradition, characterised by its complex rhythms and melodic sensibilities, provides a significant source of inspiration. Similarly, mystical Middle Eastern music, with its emphasis on spiritual and emotional depth, offers a unique perspective on the art of music. The refinement of music and lyrics from the Arab world exemplifies the region's cultural sophistication, while the folk music of the Maghreb region provides a lively form of musical expression.

Over more than a decade, the orchestra has performed in concerts with international artists and companies including Estrella Morente, Sami Yusuf, Cappella Amsterdam, Nabyla Maan, Nai Barghouti, Naaz, Ghalia Benali, Karima el Filali, Najat Rajoui, the Royal Concertgebouw Orchestra and the Metropole Orkest. In 2021, they interpreted classical Arabic poetry at the Amsterdam music hall Bimhuis in their programme titled "The Tree of Being". This was inspired by poems written by the Sufi poet Ibn Arabi (1165–1240), who believed that trees were the perfect creation in the universe.

In October 2024, the AAO performed a concert dedicated to the music of Arab music icon Umm Kulthum, featuring Moroccan singer Karima el Filali. They also played at festivals and venues such as the Holland Festival, Le Guess Who?, TivoliVredenburg and Muziekgebouw aan 't IJ. On Dutch TV, they also made appearances at Podium Klassiek, Vrije Geluiden and On Stage. Sometimes adding other instruments, the AAO usually comprises the following line-up: violin, viola, oud, qanun, ney, rabab, string bass, percussion. Strengthening musical exchange with Moroccan musicians, the AAO has also performed in Tangier and Rabat.

The AAO has also been active in the theatre: they worked with theatre and dance companies including ICK Dans Amsterdam, Orkater and Jeugdtheater de Krakeling. Together with the Meervaart theatre, the AAO has been organising the biennial Ud Festival. In September 2021, the Amsterdam Andalusian Orchestra, Meervaart and FOAM Photography Museum Amsterdam created the cultural centre Maqam in Amsterdam-West.

== Awards and recognitions ==
In 2024 the AAO won the Dutch Cultuurfonds Prize.

== Selected performances and productions ==
=== Major productions/collaborations ===
- ICK Dans Amsterdam and Amsterdams Andalusisch Orkest – Ziel/Rouh (2018)
- Wat we doen, Amsterdams Andalusisch Orkest, George and Eran Producties and ICK Amsterdam – Hoe Ik Talent Voor Het Leven Kreeg (English: How I acquired a Talent for Life) 2020, based on a book by Rodaan Al Galidi)
- George and Eran Producties with Senf Theaterpartners, Theater de Meervaart and Amsterdams Andalusisch Orchestra – Jihad of Love (2020, based on a book by David Van Reybrouck)
- "The Tree of Being", music based on poems by Ibn Arabi, Bimhuis Amsterdam (2021)

=== Notable performances/concerts ===
- at Holland Festival: Safar Nord-Sud (2016), Holland Festival Proms Jalasat Rouhiya (2018), One (2020)
- with Abir El Abed: Chaabi Andalusi (2016)
- with Karima el Filali: A tribute to Oum Kalthoum (2020)
- Sanaa Marahati featuring Amsterdams Andalusisch Orkest (2022)
- with Sami Yusuf and Cappella Amsterdam: When Paths Meet (Holland Festival, 2022)
- with Estrella Morente (2022)
- with Redouan Ait Chitt and Denden Karadeniz: Remla (2022)
- with Cappella Amsterdam: Cantigas – Verhalen uit Al-Andalus (2023)
- with Nai Barghouti and Metropole Orkest (2023)
- with Naaz and Concertgebouw Orchestra (2024)
- with Theater De Meervaart: Café 749 (2024)
- with Arion de Munck: Hadra Immersive (2024)

== Discography ==
- Abir El Abed and Amsterdams Andalusisch Orkest – Andalusian Echoes (2017)
- Amsterdams Andalusisch Orkest – Ziel | Rouh (2018)
- Salah Eddine Mesbah and Amsterdams Andalusisch Orkest – Mystic Mirrors (2020)
- Sami Yusuf, Cappella Amsterdam and Amsterdams Andalusisch Orkest – When Paths Meet – Live at the Holland Festival (2023)
- Amsterdams Andalusisch Orkest – Andalusian Currents (2024)

== Reception ==
Reviews about the AAO have placed it in the Dutch cultural mainstream as an orchestra that both preserves and reinterprets Andalusian/Arab musical heritage – one that has been institutionally recognised, collaborates widely across international and the Dutch performing arts, and contributes to debates about multicultural identity and cultural memory.

Thus, Dutch daily newspaper Het Parool wrote about one of their performances: "The musicians effortlessly tap into diverse registers. Classical Arabic vocals, funk, smooth jazz: this ensemble can play it all." De Volkskrant included their programme Jihad of Love in its list of 10 best theatre performances of the 2019-2020 season and called Estrella Morente's concert with the Amsterdam Andalusian Orchestra "one of the most spectacular shows" of Le Guess Who? festival in 2022.

Commenting on the orchestra's distinction with the prestigious Dutch Cultuurfonds Prize and a € 100,000 grant, the organization's director Cathelijne Broers said: "The AAO uniquely connects cultural heritage with the present" and it "reaches a wide and diverse audience, both in the Netherlands and internationally".

== See also ==
- Music of Algeria
- Music of Morocco
- Music of Tunisia
- Music of Libya
