= Don't Say Love =

Single by Leigh-Anne
- Released: 16 June 2023
- Genre: UK garage; dance-pop
- Length: 3:01
- Label: Warner
- Composers: Jon Bellion; Jimmie Gutch; Pete Nappi
- Lyricists: Leigh-Anne Pinnock; Gregory Aldae Hein
- Producers: Bellion; Gutch; Nappi

Leigh-Anne singles chronology
"Don't Say Love" (2023)	"My Love" (2023)

Music video
- "Don't Say Love" on YouTube

"Don't Say Love" is the first solo single by English singer and songwriter Leigh-Anne, released on 16 June 2023 by Warner Records. It is her first solo endeavour after Little Mix began their hiatus in May 2022. Leigh-Anne, alongside Gregory Aldae Hein wrote the lyrics whereas Jon Bellion, Jimmie Gutch and Pete Nappi participated in the composition and production of the track.

Described as a UK garage and dance-pop track, the lyrics were inspired by Leigh-Anne's frustration that came with feeling invisible in her career. The music video was released the same day as the single and represents the singer’s rebirth in life and music, as she embarks on a quest to find herself. Upon release, it was met with positive reviews from critics, who praised the song's production and vocals.

The song topped the UK Singles Sales Chart, while reaching number two on the UK Singles Downloads Chart. It entered at number eleven on the UK Singles Chart, and was named the second most purchased physical single in the UK during the summer. It also entered the charts inside Ireland, Latvia, Hungary, Croatia, New Zealand, and Nigeria.

== Background ==
Pinnock signed a solo record contract with Warner Records in February 2022. In May, following their Confetti Tour, Little Mix announced an extended hiatus in order to pursue solo careers. In March 2023, Pinnock shared that she had been working with producer Kuk Harrell. In May, her manager stated that a music video, as well as "photos and trailers", were being worked on. The single's artwork was inspired by Pinnock paying homage to Mariah Carey's The Emancipation of Mimi album cover.

== Release and promotion ==
On 5 June 2023, Pinnock initiated speculations about her debut, tweeting the hashtag "#LeighAnneIsComing" and encouraging fans to join her Discord server. She wiped her Instagram profile and posted a 26-second teaser video of the song, then titled "DSL"; the video, described as "futuristic", shows Pinnock dressed in an "sparkling sequinned leotard".

On 8 June, she announced the single and posted the cover art, revealing that she had waited an "incredibly long time" to do so. The song was made available to pre-order and pre-save on streaming platforms. In an interview with British Vogue, Pinnock shared an exclusive 16 second preview of the music video. Leigh-Anne continued to tease the song and the music video with daily uploads featuring behind the scene footage and visuals teasers of the music video. The single and its music video were released on 16 June 2023.

On 21 July 2023, a remix of "Don't Say Love" by Mas Tiempo featuring rapper Skepta and grime MC Jammer was released. An R&B remix of the song was released on 4 August 2023. The song had its debut performance at Capital's Up Close with Lucozade Zero. It was later performed at Vevo's London Studios in September 2023.

In October 2023, the song was performed at KISS Haunted House Party. In November 2023, the track was performed at S&C presents Hugo Nights.

== Composition ==
Carl Smith of the Official Charts Company described "Don't Say Love" as a song that "fuses elements of dance with a hint of nostalgic UK garage". Leigh-Anne described the track as a mixture of R&B, amapiano, UK garage, afrobeats, and pop, and stated that, lyrically, it is about wanting to be loved, "[expressing] the pain and frustration that came with feeling invisible and unheard for so much of [her] career."

Billboard's Lars Brandle described the track as a "beats-heavy nugget with lashings of UK garage", with lyrics about someone who "no longer seeks external validation and who seeks to regain back their confidence after feeling unheard misunderstood". Rolling Stone's Tomás Mier described it "as an upbeat dance-pop track." Charlotte Manning from Attitude, described "Don't say Love". "as the track opens with thumping beats, which give off an uber cool garage vibe."

== Music video ==
The music video for "Don't Say Love" was directed by Emil Nava. Leigh-Anne said that the video is about "trying to escape the feeling of being overlooked and undervalued", adding that she wanted to get across emotions of "frustration, sadness, [and] anger" through the video. Jenke Ahmed styled the video; there are eight different "looks" in the video. She further noted that the music video is a visual representation of her "finding [her] voice".

At the end of the music video Leigh-Anne teased the second single release with a teaser of the next song titled "My Love".

== Critical reception ==
Following its release, Gay Times' Lewis Corner described it as an "infectious new song with a cinematic visual that positions [Leigh-Anne] as an exciting force in pop in her own right."

Charlotte Manning from Attitude, described "Don't Say Love" as a "pop anthem", giving praise to the song's lyrics and to Leigh-Anne vocals. NME's Kyann-Sian Williams described the track as "dance–pop" with influences track of garage and house-inspired that "sees the star deal in the complexities of love". Steffanee Wang from Nylon described it as a "00s, breakbeat pop banger."

== Track listings ==
- Streaming/digital download
1. "Don't Say Love" – 3:00
- Streaming/digital download – Mas Tiempo remix
1. "Don't Say Love" (Mas Tiempo remix) – 2:32
- Streaming/digital download – R&B version
1. "Don't Say Love" (R&B version) – 3:00

== Charts ==
Chart performance for "Don't Say Love"
Chart (2023–2024)	Peak position
Croatia (HRT)	85
Czech Republic Airplay (ČNS IFPI)	5
Hungary (Single Top 40)	6
Ireland (IRMA)	45
Latvia (EHR)	33
New Zealand Hot Singles (RMNZ)	18
Nigeria (TurnTable Top 100)	99
UK Singles (Official Charts)	11

== Release history ==
"Don't Say Love" release history
Region	Date	Version	Format(s)	Label(s)	Ref.
Various	16 June 2023	Original	Digital download; streaming	Warner	
United Kingdom	16 June 2023	Original	CD	Warner	
Various	21 July 2023	Mas Tiempo remix	Digital download; streaming	Warner	
Various	4 August 2023	R&B version	Digital download; streaming	Warner	
