= Lana Lubany =

Palestinian singer (born 1996)

Lana Lubany لانا لوباني
- Born: 3 November 1996 (age 29)
- Origin: London, England
- Genres: Alternative pop
- Instrument: Vocals
- Years active: 2017–present
- Labels: Beatnik Creative; AWAL Recordings

Lana Lubany (Arabic: لانا لوباني; born 3 November 1996) is a Palestinian singer-songwriter based in London. She has released three EPs and gained prominence through the bilingual single "THE SNAKE". The Guardian named her one of the most promising musical newcomers of 2023. She was a 2025 Record of the Day One to Watch.

== Early life ==
Lubany grew up between Jaffa and Nazareth. Her maternal grandmother is American from New Jersey. Lubany was a member of a peace choir in her youth. She finished high school in 2015 and moved to London in 2017 to study Songwriting at the BIMM Music Institute.

== Career ==
Lubany released her debut single "One of a Kind" in 2017. This was followed by "Still Love U Call Me", "Sleepless Wonderland" and "Come Midnight" in 2018 and "Fairy Dust" in 2019. Lubany's debut EP Devil in my Eden was released in June 2020. This was accompanied by the singles "Alive in Hell" and "Isolation".

After a string of singles over 2021 including "Bad Angel", "Down I Go" and "Psycho I Go" , Lubany's 2022 single "THE SNAKE" went viral on social. Co-written with her collaborator Ben Thomson, "THE SNAKE" marked her first bilingual Arabic–English song. With the singles "Sold" and "Clones" in 2022 and "Point of No Return", "On My Way" and "Expectations" in early 2023, Lubany's second EP The Holy Land was released in June 2023. She had her first live gigs supporting Saint Levant and performing at The Great Escape Festival that spring and summer.

Signing with AWAL Recordings in early 2024, Lubany released her first singles under the label "STANNA" and "Make It Better". Lubany's third six-track EP YAFA was released at the end of October 2024 along with the singles "ANOTHER YEAR", "PRAYERS" and "NAZARETH". She supported The Last Dinner Party on tour in February, performed at the Reeperbahn Festival in May, and had her first headline tour dates in Europe that autumn. She featured in the 2025 Nawafiz Festival. In September 2025, Lubany took part in Brian Eno's Together for Palestine benefit concert at Wembley Arena. Lubany joined her fellow Together for Palestine participants to collaborate on a charity single titled "Lullaby", released that December.

== Artistry ==
Lubany was introduced to music through classic rock bands such as Queen and Def Leppard through her father, jazz from Ella Fitzgerald and Billie Holiday through her American grandmother, as well as Arab artists such as Fairuz and Umm Kulthum. She was "obsessed" with Amy Diamond in her youth and would attempt to imitate Demi Lovato. She also named the likes of Ed Sheeran and Halsey as early influences. Lubany's more recent influences include Rosalía and Leon Thomas.

With the single "THE SNAKE", Lubany began singing bilingually in Arabic and English, drawing comparisons to Rosalía and Nxdia. Her third EP YAFA is based around her identity as a Palestinian.

== Discography ==
=== EPs ===
- Devil in my Eden (2020)
- The Holy Land (2023)
- YAFA (2024)

=== Singles ===
- "One of a Kind" (2017)
- "Still Love U Call Me" (2018)
- "Sleepless Wonderland" (2018)
- "Come Midnight" (2018)
- "Fairy Dust" (2019)
- "Alive in Hell" (2020)
- "Isolation" (2020)
- "S.A.D." (2021), with Sugar Jesus
- "Bad Angel" (2021)
- "Down I Go" (2021)
- "Psycho I Go" (2021)
- "THE SNAKE" (2022)
- "Sold" (2022)
- "Clones" (2022)
- "Point of No Return" (2023)
- "On My Way" (2023)
- "Expectations" (2023)
- "make it better" (2024)
- "STANNA" (2024)
- "ANOTHER YEAR" (2024)
- "PRAYERS" (2024)
- "NAZARETH" (2024)
- "73T" (2025)
- "The CURRENCY" (2026)
