= May Sayegh =

Palestinian poet and activist (1940–2023)

- مي الصايغ
- Born: May Musa Sayegh; 1940; Gaza City, Mandatory Palestine
- Died: 5 February 2023 (aged 82)
- Occupations: Poet, feminist

May Musa Sayegh (Arabic: مي الصايغ; 1940 – 5 February 2023), also spelled Mai Sayegh, was a Palestinian poet, feminist, political activist, and writer.

== Early life ==
Sayegh was born in 1940 in Gaza city in Mandatory Palestine. She received a bachelor's degree in philosophy and sociology from the Cairo University. In 1954, she headed the women's section of the Ba'ath Party. In the aftermath of the Six Day War in 1967 and the occupation of the Gaza Strip, she fled Gaza and settled in Beirut.

== Career ==
Sayegh was the secretary-general of the Palestine Liberation Organization's (PLO) Women's Union from 1976 to 1986, and a member of the Palestine National Council (PNC). The General Union of Palestinian Women was itself formed in 1965 as a result of a PNC decision in 1964. She was a speaker at the 1980 United Nations Women's Conference in Copenhagen where she received "thunderous applause" for her speech on promoting peace, equality and development. She stated that the results of the conference were a success not only for Palestinians but "for all peoples fighting against racism, exploitation and foreign rule".

== Beliefs ==
=== Israeli-Palestinian conflict ===
Known for her strong anti-Zionist views, Sayegh once said that the goal of Palestinians was the liberation of Palestine and that "any Palestinian who wanted less was a traitor". She also wrote poems about the struggles faced by women in the Palestinian refugee camps. Her poems have been published in prominent Arab magazines across the region such as the Al-Adab magazine in Lebanon, Aqlam magazine in Iraq. She has also participated in poetry festivals across the Arab World including in Beirut, Baghdad, Kuwait City, Oman, and Cairo.

=== Women's rights ===
Within the Palestinian community, she was an outspoken advocate for women's rights, especially politically, calling for greater inclusion of women in the Palestine National Council and in policymaking. Sayegh believed that the segregation of men and women was a form of discrimination as it prioritised males. In 1968, she took a stand against Fatah's policy of men leading women based purely on their gender and eventually led to gender equality at grassroot levels of Fateh. Her bold approach to empowering women has attracted criticism, with one commentator in 1981 stating that "she shouts too much".

== Personal life and death ==
Sayegh was married to Abu Hatam, a PLO official. She died on 5 February 2023, at the age of 82.

== Recognition ==
Sayegh received the Ana Betancourt award in the 1980s from Cuban president Fidel Castro.

Sayegh was also the subject of a 2001 documentary film Stories from Gaza (Arabic: حكيات من غزة), produced by Mer’ah Media and directed by Lebanese filmmaker Arab Loutfi.

== See also ==
- Women in Palestine
