= Stealin' Love =

Single by Leigh-Anne

from the EP No Hard Feelings
- Released: 28 March 2024
- Genre: R&B; electropop
- Length: 2:20
- Label: Warner
- Composers: Ian Kirkpatrick; Philip Plested; Jackson; Romans
- Lyricists: Leigh-Anne Pinnock; Jermaine Jackson; Romans
- Producers: Kirkpatrick; The Runners

Leigh-Anne singles chronology
"My Love" (2023)	"Stealin' Love" (2024)	"Forbidden Fruit" (2024)

Music video
- "Stealin' Love" on YouTube

"Stealin' Love" is a song by English singer and songwriter Leigh-Anne. It was released on 28 March 2024 through Warner Records as the lead single from her debut extended play, No Hard Feelings.

== Background ==
"Stealin' Love" was first teased in June 2023, in an interview with British Vogue, after Leigh-Anne spoke about her challenges with motherhood and revealed details about her upcoming debut album. The song was originally set to be included where she said:

"It's about somebody stealing love away from you – you give so much and they're taking it and not giving enough in return. There's stuff that I'm going to be unveiling about our relationship that's scary. I'm getting married, he's the love of my life, but we've been through shit. Fully showing something for what it is is a really vulnerable thing to do and that does petrify me, but at the same time, it's life. Relationships are frickin' hard work. If something is good enough to fight for then that's the main thing".

In March 2024, she announced a separate music project that was different to her upcoming solo album. It would feature five tracks which would "fit together in their own world". "Stealin' Love" was first teased across her social media pages and was first written in 2020. A visualiser for the track along with an additional video of Leigh-Anne performing choreography with a dancer was also revealed.

== Composition ==
"Stealin' Love" has been described as an R&B and electropop track, with lyrics exploring themes of love and growth.

== Charts ==
Chart performance for "Stealin' Love"
Chart (2024)	Peak position
UK Singles Downloads (OCC)	60
UK Singles Sales (OCC)	64

== Release history ==
Release dates and formats for "Stealin' Love"
Region	Date	Format	Label	Ref.
Various	28 March 2024	Digital download; streaming	Warner	
Italy	29 March 2024	Radio airplay	Warner	
