= My Love (Leigh-Anne Pinnock song) =

Single by Leigh-Anne featuring Ayra Starr
- Released: 7 September 2023
- Genre: Afropop; afrobeats; R&B; pop
- Length: 2:56
- Label: Warner
- Composers: Alex Goldblatt; Dayo Olatunji; Kameron Glasper; Khristopher Riddick-Tynes; Ras Kassa Alexander
- Lyricists: Leigh-Anne Pinnock; Kareem Olasunkanmi Temitayo; Oyinkansola Sarah Aderibigbe
- Producers: Goldblatt; Riddick-Tynes; PRGRSHN

Leigh-Anne singles chronology
"Don't Say Love" (2023)	"My Love" (2023)	"Stealin' Love" (2024)

Ayra Starr singles chronology
"My Baby" (remix) (2023)	"My Love" (2023)	"Rhythm & Blues" (2023)

Music video
- "My Love" on YouTube

"My Love" is a song by English singer and songwriter Leigh-Anne, featuring Nigerian singer Ayra Starr. It was released on 7 September 2023, through Warner Records. The song and music video received acclaim from critics who praised Leigh-Anne's versatility as a solo artist, and the music video for paying homage to Nigeria's culture. It has been described as a afrobeats and afropop track, with elements of R&B and pop sounds. On 24 November 2023, a remixed version of the song featuring Swedish rapper Jireel was released.

"My Love" is Leigh-Anne's first collaboration as a solo artist. Commercially, it reached number three on the UK Singles Sales Chart, number fourteen on the UK Singles Downloads Chart, and number thirteen on the UK R&B Singles Chart. It became her first chart entry on the U.S. Billboard Afrobeats Songs chart, where it reached number thirty-two. "My Love" reached number five in Suriname and charted in Nigeria and Latvia and debuted at number twenty-eight on the UK Singles Chart, becoming both Leigh-Anne's and Ayra Starr's second top forty entry. However it only spent two weeks on the charts.

== Background and release ==
Pinnock first teased "My Love" as a single during an interview with British Vogue, describing the track as a "a celebration of every type of love". A snippet of it was played during the end of the music video of her debut single "Don't Say Love" as a continuation. In a letter to her fans, Leigh-Anne explained how the collaboration came about:

“When we wrote this song, I just knew it was something special, it perfectly captures the essence of who I want to be as a solo artist,” Leigh-Anne says. “That feel-good, powerful, and anthemic song - it's all about celebrating self-love and embracing its incredible power, and when there was a discussion on a feature I know Ayra was the only one who could embody and amplify this message.”

Leigh-Anne teased the release date of "My Love" on her social media pages, posting snippets on TikTok, featuring first seen looks from the music video and her performing choreography. In a photoshoot for Rolling Stone UK, she said that the new single pays homage for her love of afrobeats. A remix of the song featuring Swedish rapper Jireel was released on 24 November 2023.

== Critical reception ==
Following its release, Jason Lipshutz from Billboard included "My Love" in his list of the 10 cool new pop songs to get you through the week and wrote: "My Love" is designed to be bellowed among groups of friends on the dance floor, and succeeds in pushing Leigh-Anne's sound into the future". In a review for Women in Pop, Ruby Okoro described it as an "Afropop sound mixed with R&B and classic pop", and gave praise towards Leigh-Anne's vocals. In The Honey Pop, Jazmin Williams described it "as full of Afrobeats and Afropop goodness that feels full of life as the rhythm flows through your body."

Martie Bowser from Blavity described it as an anthem that explores the complex truths about self-love and relationships. DIY's Daisy Carter wrote that the "afrobeat-influenced track serves as a celebration of Nigerian culture and creatives". Fault Magazine's Miles Holder described it as a song "that shows off Leigh-Anne's versatility as an artist, as she ventures into new sonic territory, embracing the vibrant rhythms of afrobeat".

Euphoria's Nmesoma Okechukwu wrote that "My Love" is "exciting, and makes you want to jump up and start dancing, while its accompanying music video has all the ingredients of great visuals and beautiful choreography". LBB wrote how the music video celebrates Nigeria's rich culture and masterfully weaves elements of local fashion, dance, and the country's landscapes". They further added how "My Love" stands as a testament to the magic that happens when exceptional talent, culture, and creativity unite".

== Music video ==
The music video was filmed in Lagos, Nigeria and was directed by Nigerian music video director Meji Alabi. Leigh-Anne worked with executive producer Martin Roker, director of photography Stefan Yap, producer Ghandi El-Chamma, while production was handled by Black Dog Films.

The opening shot showcases Leigh-Anne emerging from the ocean, cementing her rebirth as a solo artist. The music video features choreography from local dancers and cameos from local actors which pays homages and celebrates Nigerian culture.

== Awards and nominations ==
Year	Award ceremony	Category	Nominee(s)/work(s)	Result	Ref.
2024	UK Music Video Awards	Best R&B / Soul Video UK	"My Love"	Nominated	

== Promotion ==
Prior to its release, Leigh-Anne performed the song for the first time at Capital Up Close in partnership with Lucozade, which marked her first gig as a solo artist. It was later performed at Vevo's London Studios. It has since been performed at BBC's Live Lounge, KISS-FM Haunted House Party and at S&C presents Hugo Nights. Leigh-Anne later performed the single at Children in Need and performed it alongside Iza at the Afropunk Festival in Brazil.

== Track listings and formats ==
"My Love" – Streaming/digital download
No.	Title	Length
1.	"My Love" (featuring Ayra Starr)	2:56

"My Love" – CD edition
No.	Title	Length
1.	"My Love" (featuring Ayra Starr)	2:56
2.	"My Love (Stripped version)"	2:12
Total length:		5:08

"My Love" – Alternative Cover #1 CD edition
No.	Title	Length
1.	"My Love (Plus Personal Message #1)" (featuring Ayra Starr)	3:47

"My Love" – Alternative Cover #2 CD edition
No.	Title	Length
1.	"My Love (Plus Personal Message #2)" (featuring Ayra Starr)	3:14

"My Love" – Streaming/digital download – Remixes
No.	Title	Length
1.	"My Love (DJ Maphorisa remix)" (featuring Ayra Starr)	3:30
2.	"My Love (Bunt. remix)" (featuring Ayra Starr)	2:50
3.	"My Love (Crate Classics remix)" (featuring Ayra Starr and Beam)	3:02
Total length:		9:22

"My Love" – Streaming/digital download
No.	Title	Length
1.	"My Love" (featuring Ayra Starr and Jireel)	2:54

== Charts ==
Chart performance for "My Love"
Chart (2023)	Peak position
Nigeria (TurnTable Top 100)	51
Suriname (Nationale Top 40)	5
UK Singles (OCC)	28
UK Hip Hop/R&B (OCC)	13
US Afrobeats Songs (Billboard)	32

== Release history ==
Release dates and formats for "My Love"
Region	Date	Format	Label	Ref.
Various	7 September 2023	Digital download; streaming	Warner	
United Kingdom	7 September 2023	CD single	Warner	
Italy	7 September 2023	Radio airplay	Warner	
