= Nai Barghouti =

Palestinian singer and musician (born 1996)

- Nai Barghouti in 2026

Background information
- Born: 24 September 1996 (age 30); Ramallah
- Occupations: Singer, musician, songwriter
- Instrument: transverse flute

Nai Barghouti (born 24 September 1996) is a Palestinian singer-songwriter based in Amsterdam. Her music style combines traditional and classical Arabic and Palestinian music with Western classical music and jazz.

== Biography ==
Nai Barghouti grew up in Ramallah in the West Bank. Her parents named her after the musical instrument the ney, a Middle Eastern type of flute. Her father is an engineer and human rights activist, and her mother is a sex educator. Her family was very interested in art and music: her mother sang in a choir, her father was a choreographer for a time, and her older sister Jenna studied violin. She was thus exposed to all kinds of music from an early age: Western, Arabic, and Indian classical music, pop, and jazz. From childhood, Barghouti's musical influences included Umm Kulthum, Sayed Darwish, Zakariyya Ahmad, Mohammed Abdel Wahab, Ziad Rahbani, the Rahbani brothers and especially Fairuz.

Barghouti studied the transverse flute combined with Western classical music at the Edward Said Conservatory in Jerusalem. At 16, she moved to Bloomington, Indiana, in the United States. This program also focused strongly on Western classical music. Barghouti decided she wanted to delve deeper into jazz and jazz singing. In 2016, she therefore transferred to the Conservatory of Amsterdam in the Netherlands. There she was able to study jazz and was given the freedom to work on her own projects, incorporating her Arabic roots. She obtained a master's degree in jazz music in Amsterdam.

== Style and themes ==
Barghouti developed her own vocal style which she calls "naistrumentation" or "naistrumenting". In this style she sings without words and with many ornaments. Her style combines elements of vocal jazz (particularly scat singing) and Arabic music. During her concerts, Barghouti sings and plays her own works as well as works by Arab singers and composers such as Fairouz, Umm Kulthum, Marcel Khalife, Mohammed Abdel Wahab, Zakariyya Ahmad, Riad al Sunbati and the Rahbani brothers.

One of the themes in Barghouti's work is the Israeli occupation of Palestine. In 2022, she dedicated a song to Shireen Abu Akleh, the Palestinian-American journalist who was shot dead in 2022.

== Performances and collaborations ==
Barghouti regularly performs with her own band, featuring musicians such as Tony Roe (piano), Khalil Khoury (qanun), Diego Alva (bass guitar), and Ruven Ruppik (percussion). She has also worked with various orchestras, including Phion, the Metropole Orkest, and the Amsterdam Andalusian Orchestra. NRC wrote about one of Barghouti's concerts with Phion and Aylin Sezer: "The wonderful Palestinian Barghouti enchants with two songs by Wahab ('Sakan Al-Layl' and 'Inta Omry'), strongly accompanied by Phion".

Barghouti has given concerts in many countries and cities, including Paris (Théâtre de la Ville), London, New York, Istanbul, Beirut and Cairo. She also performed on the Dutch TV show Podium Klassiek. In 2013, she performed before the United Nations on the occasion of the International Day of Solidarity with the Palestinian People. In 2019, Barghouti toured with the Palestine Youth Orchestra. During this tour, she performed at the Royal Concertgebouw, among other venues. De Volkskrant wrote that Barghouti "in improvisations, she put her unprecedentedly flexible voice to use with runs that grate on jazz".

In 2011, Barghouti collaborated with Rim Banna, among others, on the album A Time to Cry - A Lament over Jerusalem. In 2021, Barghouti provided vocals for the song "Sumud" by Fresku and in 2023 for Xena by Skrillex.

== Awards and recognition ==
In 2020, Barghouti won the Young Talent Award of the Royal Concertgebouw.

In 2024, Barghouti reached the top spot of The Official Lebanese Top 20 (OLT20) with "Li Fairuz", her version of Fairuz's "Li Beirut". The Official Lebanese Top 20 is compiled by IPSOS and is a list of songs that have been played the most on Lebanese radio stations during the previous week.

== Discography ==
- A Time to Cry - A Lament over Jerusalem with Rim Banna, Jawaher Shofani, Wissam Murad (2010)
- Nai 1 (2022)
