= General Union of Palestinian Women =

Women's representative body in the PLO

General Union of Palestinian Women الإتحاد العام للمرأة الفلسطينية
- Abbreviation: GUPW
- Formation: 1965
- Location(s): Gaza City & Ramallah
- President: Intissar al-Wazir
- Parent organization: PLO
- Website: gupw.net

The General Union of Palestinian Women (GUPW or GUPWom) is the official representative of Palestinian women within the Palestine Liberation Organization (PLO). The GUPW's executive committee consists of several members including the president, co-founder Intissar al-Wazir. The GUPW was established in 1965 as a body in the PLO with the goal of creating an active role for women in the social, economic, and political spheres of the Palestinian territories. The GUPW advocates a democratic government and a sovereign Palestinian state as a precursor to attaining women's social and political rights. The GUPW has established branches in several countries in the Middle East and Europe to further support women's movements through educational opportunities, financial assistance, and more.

== Origins ==
Palestinian women's involvement in movements and political action was shaped by the British colonial presence in Palestine beginning in 1917 and the mass displacement of Palestinians by Zionist militias and the Israeli Army during the Nakba of 1948. Prior to the formation of the Palestine Liberation Organization (PLO) in 1964 and prior to the rise of the Palestinian nationalist movement in the mid-1960s, there was a long-standing tradition of Palestinian women, generally from middle-class backgrounds living in larger city centers, engaging in political and charitable activity to help disenfranchised Palestinians.

Precursory organizations to the GUPW included the Arab Women's Union (AWU), founded in 1929 in Jerusalem. The AWU recognized the importance of education centers for women's politicization and actively organized female students from Nablus and Jerusalem because middle-class student recruits had the resources to organize and participate in political and charitable actions with the AWU. The AWU's engagements consisted of educational outreach and mutual aid for rural, impoverished, disabled, and formerly incarcerated Palestinians. Palestinian women in the AWU established clinics, infant centers, educational centers, and playgrounds for children. Women in the AWU called for a general strike and participated in militant protests against police to protest against British and Zionist colonialism.

As Palestinian identities continued to be redefined through the precarious status of the Palestinian state, the Arab Women's Union renamed itself the Palestinian Arab Women's Union in 1944. This name change symbolized the cultivation of a Palestinian Arab identity within the rise of pan-Arab consciousness of the 1940s. Eventually, the word "general" was adopted into the organization's name, and it became the General Union of Palestinian Women before its official establishment in 1965. The formation of the GUPW was aided by other general unions organized under the PLO umbrella. The General Union of Palestinian Students (GUPS) gave Palestinian women access to their organization's resources and office space leading up to the formation of the GUPW.

The GUPW was officially formed after a meeting was called by AWU leader Zulaykha al-Shihabi in February 1965 to address unifying the fragmented networks of Palestinian women. One of the groups who were instrumental in the establishment of the GUPW was the Gaza women's delegation led by Yusra Al Barbari. Committees and representatives were established and the GUPW was recognized as the sole, official organization for women under the PLO in June 1965. Palestinian women felt the strife of fragmentation of their organizational networks after the Nakba in 1948 and sought to form a union that embodied a distinct Palestinian female identity shaped by colonial occupation and mass displacement. There was great emphasis on underscoring solidarity between Palestinian women between class lines and mobilizing women's skills to serve the Palestinian cause for liberation, effectively tying the pursuit of Palestinian statehood to the Palestinian women's cause.

== Goals and work ==
The General Union of Palestinian Women (GUPW) was established as a body of the PLO in 1965 with the primary goal of representing Palestinian women within the PLO. Since its establishment, the GUPW has emphasized Palestinian women's active participation in arms training and guerrilla warfare as a means for furthering the Palestinian cause for liberation. The GUPW's advocacy has also revolved around charity work, which led the GUPW to open and operate more than 90 women's centers in refugee camps, where they established literacy programs. In the early 1990s, the GUPW shifted towards focusing on legal advocacy for Palestinian women as the formation of an official Palestinian state seemed closer to becoming a real possibility. This advocacy took on the form of including a legislative end to gender discrimination in prior legal documents that did not previously address Palestinian women's concerns about gender inequality.

In 1990, the Union's secretariat in Tunis received word from several members of diasporic branches about disapproval toward the PLO's sales of Palestinian Family Identity cards. The card detailed information of one's age, sex, occupation, marital status, and religion. Under Islamic Family Law, the marital status section allowed one to list up to four wives. The secretariat and the Union's members believed the distribution of the card revoked equality and pluralism granted by the Palestinian Declaration of Independence. Following expressions of disapproval, the Palestinian identity card's distribution was halted as it was revealed the card was never approved to be circulated.

In 1994, the Women's Affairs Technical Committee (WATC) was in discussion with the GUPW about drafting a Palestinian Feminist Charter, which was later adopted on February 8 of that year. The Feminist Charter was influenced by the Palestinian Charter of Independence and the United Nations Charter. In the Feminist Charter, the GUPW and the WATC advocate for a democratic society built on the basis of gender equality and opportunity, as well as the elimination of gender discrimination.

In an effort to encourage women to take part in the local elections that were held in 2016, the GUPW broadcast television programs, put up banners and billboards, and passed out brochures with the goal of prompting women to vote and run in these local elections.

On October 10, 2020, the GUPW, along with other activist groups, established the "My Constitution Includes Me" project. The goal of this project is to make changes to the constitution of Palestine that would further advance equality between men and women. One of these changes includes legislation that allows Palestinian women to maintain their citizenship when marrying a non-Palestinian and allowing women to give their children Palestinian citizenship regardless of their birthplace.

In November 2022, the GUPW collaborated with UN Women Palestine on their annual Open Day on Women, Peace, and Security (WPS). The theme for the 2022 Open Day was "What Palestinian Women Want: A Women-Centered Vision for A Viable Independent State." Members of feminist organizations in the West Bank and Palestinian speakers from diasporic communities organized alongside UN representatives and international institutions to discuss the effects of the occupation of Palestine on women and girls in the region.

Today, the GUPW continues to advocate for the idea that Palestinian women's social and political rights can only be achieved through an independent, democratic government. As such, one of the main goals of the GUPW is a sovereign Palestinian state where the Palestinian people maintain the right to self-determination and the city of Jerusalem is recognized as the state's capital.

== Notable people ==
- Issam Abdulhadi – former president (1960s)
- Zulaykha al-Shihabi – co-founder, 1965
- Intisar al-Wazir (Um Jihad) – co-founder, president
- Samira Abu Ghazaleh – former head of the GUPW branch in Egypt
- Salwa Abu Khadra – former secretary general
- Shadia Helou – former member of the GUPW branch in Lebanon
- Rima Nazzal – member of the Union Secretariat
- May Sayegh – former secretary general (1975-1985)
- Hana Siyam – former member of the GUPW Administrative Council for Fateh
- Manhal Um – former Member of the GUPW Administrative Council

=== Intissar al-Wazir (Um Jihad) ===
Intissar al-Wazir is the co-founder and president of the General Union of Palestinian Women. She is commonly referred to as the "mother of the fight" due to her contributions to the organization and its cause, which have been linked to growing membership numbers among both Palestinian and non-Palestinian women. In response to growing domestic violence and economic need due to the COVID-19 pandemic, al-Wazir called on the Prime Minister to enact legislation to combat these issues. As a result of her commitment to the Palestinian cause, al-Wazir is regarded by some as the most widely recognized and respectfully viewed woman amongst the Palestinian community.

=== Zulaykha al-Shihabi ===
Zulaykha al-Shihabi was a co-founder of the General Union of Palestinian Women. She is credited for calling the meeting in February 1965 that led to the establishment of the GUPW. She was a prominent member of Palestinian women's movements throughout her life and served as president of the Arab Women's Union until her death in 1992.

== Accomplishments and legacy ==
=== Establishment of diasporic branches ===
Beginning in the 1970s, the GUPW established diasporic branches to spread support for the women's movement worldwide. Notable branches include Algeria, Egypt, Iraq, Jordan, Kuwait, Lebanon, and Sweden.

==== Egypt branch ====
Before the establishment and spread of the Palestine Liberation Organization in 1964, several Palestinian organizations in Egypt existed. In 1962, the League of Palestinian Women in Egypt was established. The League of Palestinian Women in Egypt was converted into the Egyptian branch of the GUPW, which would serve as a base for the expansion of the Union into the Arab world.

==== Kuwait branch ====
The GUPW Kuwait branch seeks to maintain Palestinian cultural heritage through cultural activities and social services. The Union finances a series of classes, available strictly to women, as a means to increase their chances of employment. The standard offerings are sewing and typing classes, however, if interest is expressed, literacy, knitting, and English classes could also be provided.

==== Jordan branch ====
The GUPW Jordan branch was instituted as a result of the GUPW constitution, which specified that Union Headquarters should be established in the same country that is hosting the principal PLO office. The presence of GUPW Headquarters was recognized by the Jordanian government, however they did not officially recognize the branch, due to their lack of license. In 1966, the PLO office was closed by the Jordan Regime, which subsequently led to the Union's office closing as well. This closure led the Union to move its operations underground.

==== Lebanon branch ====
Beirut, Lebanon served as headquarters for the GUPW in 1973. The GUPW Lebanon branch has supported local refugee populations, residing in the Burj al-Barajneh camp, through monetary donations raised by the German Palestinian community. The donations aided 100 families who were facing harsh economic and living conditions resulting from siege repercussions and the effects of the COVID-19 pandemic. Financial help for the families depended on their family size and could range from 50,000 to 100,000 Lebanese pounds.
