= LM5 (album) =

- Standard edition cover (Note: The deluxe edition cover features a smaller black-and-white image of the group's members with a black border.)

Studio album by Little Mix
- Released: 16 November 2018
- Recorded: 2017–2018
- Genres: Pop; R&B
- Length: 44:15
- Labels: Syco; Columbia
- Producers: Jenna Andrews; Jade Thirlwall; Jesy Nelson; Leigh-Anne Pinnock; Perrie Edwards; Jameil Aossey; Louis Bell; Maegan Cottone; Trevor Dahl; Digital Farm Animals; Larrance Dopson; Electric; Goldfingers; Aaron Hibell; John Hill; Sam de Jong; Kamille; Joe Kearns; Chris Loco; Lonestarrmuzik; Loosechange; Angel Lopez; Steve Mac; MNEK; Jorgan Odegard; Matt Rad; S1; Mike Sabath; the Six; TMS; Timbaland; Federico Vindver; Yei

Little Mix chronology
Glory Days (2016)	LM5 (2018)	Confetti (2020)

Singles from LM5
- 1. "Woman Like Me" Released: 12 October 2018; 2. "Think About Us" Released: 25 January 2019

LM5 is the fifth studio album released by British girl group Little Mix, on 16 November 2018 through Syco Music and Columbia Records. Described as a pop and R&B record, while incorporating elements of reggae pop, trap-pop, hip-hop, 90s, and reggaeton sounds. It features collaborations with Nicki Minaj, Sharaya J, and Kamille, while the deluxe edition of the album features a previously released single with Cheat Codes. It was also the group's last album to be recorded with Syco Music, after parting ways with the label days prior to its release.

LM5 marked the first time that Little Mix was listed as executive producers. It has been described as a feminist album, with lyrics that were focused around women's rights, the MeToo movement, sexism, feminism, sexuality, and body positivity. It received positive reviews from critics, with praise drawn towards the album's exploration of other genres, maturity in lyrics, and their vocal performance. It has since been hailed by fans as the group's best album. The albums lead single "Woman Like Me" with Minaj peaked at number two on the UK Singles Chart and reached the top ten in seven other countries. It won British Video of the Year, at the 39th Brit Awards. Its final single "Think About Us", with Ty Dolla Sign reached number twenty-two in the UK.

LM5 peaked at number three on the UK Albums Chart, which made Little Mix the first girl group to have five consecutive top-five studio albums in the UK. It also reached the top ten in seven other music markets, and became their first album to appear on the charts in South Korea. To promote the album, the group aired exclusive performances from Apple Music Presents: Little Mix, Live From London, and performed at shows including, Strictly Come Dancing UK, MTV Europe Music Awards, and Brit Awards. They also embarked in their sixth concert tour, LM5: The Tour.

== Background ==
In March 2018, Leigh-Anne Pinnock announced that the group's fifth studio album was set to be released later in the year, and would be followed up with a tour for 2019. On 15 October 2018, Little Mix announced that the album was scheduled to be released on 16 November 2018, with the announcement revealing the album's title, with three editions of the album. The group chose to name their album LM5 as a tribute to their fans, who had used it as the name for the album before it was announced. Two days later, the track listing for the album was revealed on social media.

Ahead of its release, Little Mix had shared photos and videos on their social media's celebrating female and LGBTQ+ activists. The album took inspiration from the group's own experiences with sexism and from the Me Too movement. The album was also largely co-written by Little Mix, who are listed as executive producers for the first time. Six days before the album's release date for 16 November, Little Mix left Syco Music. The decision came after problems had surfaced between Simon Cowell's label and Little Mix's management company, Modest, allegedly over disagreements with the record label over the making of "Woman Like Me", with the group not receiving a writing credit, their musical direction, and the creative control. The group was moved within Sony Music to the RCA UK label for future releases.

In 2019, in an interview for The Guardian, Jesy Nelson stated that the group originally wanted to release "Strip" as the lead single. Nelson said "We co-directed the video, we’d done the [naked] photoshoot, so we were excited. When 'Woman Like Me' was put on the table, in our heads 'Strip' was going to be the first single". In an interview two years later in Brazil, Jade Thirlwall also said that the band’s split from Syco in 2018 "really f****d us over. It was hard to put all our creativity out there exactly how we would have liked to have done. The LM5 album was very heavily on women's rights, what it feels like to be a woman [and] our experiences in the industry."

== Promotion ==
To promote the album LM5 was supported by two singles. The album's lead single, "Woman Like Me", featuring American rapper Nicki Minaj, was released on 12 October 2018. The song reached number two on the UK Singles Chart and reached the top ten of the charts in nine other countries. The single had its first televised performance on The X Factor, on the 28 October 2018. On the 4 November in Bilbao, Spain, Little Mix performed the song with Minaj for the first time at the 2018 MTV Europe Music Awards, which was named by Billboard as the best performance of the night. The group furthered promoted the song on other televised programmes including the Michael McIntyre's Big Show, The Voice of Holland, and at the 2019 Brit Awards, with Ms Banks, in which the song received the fan-voted award for British Artist Video of the Year.

On 13 November, Little Mix, Live From London took place in London, in partnership with Apple Music. Little Mix gave exclusive performances of some of their songs from their fifth studio album LM5 with a live band. It was followed up with a Q&A with British presenter Julie Adenuga. The group performed "Told You So", "The Cure" and "Joan of Arc" for the first time including some of their previously released singles including "Black Magic" and "Touch". They was joined by American rapper Sharaya J, where they performed "Strip" for the first time. On 2 November 2018 "Joan of Arc" was released as the first promotional single of the album. A music video was originally created but never released. On 9 November 2018, "Told You So" was released as the second promotional single. On 13 November 2018, "The Cure" was released as the albums third and final promotional single.

On 15 November 2018, the group posed for a naked photoshoot for their Strip Campaign to help promote body positivity, which showed insults being marked on their bodies that the group had endured since their rise to fame. It led to fans taking to social media to take part in the hashtag Strip With Little Mix. On 16 November, a music video featuring Sharaya J, that the group co-directed for the first time was released. The music video also featured Nimco Ali, Bryony Gordon, and Hannah Witton who all took part in the campaign with interviews raising awareness on OCD, female genital mutilation, mental health, and other topics. Little Mix received mostly praise for their Strip campaign but faced criticism from British journalist Piers Morgan, who accused the group of "using sex to sell records". The group was defended by American singers Ariana Grande and Lauren Jauregui via social media. A music video for "More Than Words" was also released on 16 November 2018.

On 21 January 2019, it was announced that "Think About Us", featuring Ty Dolla Sign, would be released as the album's second and last single. The single was performed at shows including on The Graham Norton Show, The Brits Are Coming, and The Voice of Holland. The song reached number 22 in the UK and charted in New Zealand, Scotland, Czech Republic and Croatia. It was the Little Mix's last single to be released under Syco Music. Despite not being released as a single, a lyric video for "Wasabi" was released on 26 July 2019, and on 12 March 2020, an official video for "Wasabi" was posted onto their YouTube channel. A deluxe version of LM5, was later released and features the single "Only You", with Cheat Codes.

== Critical reception ==
Professional ratings
Aggregate scores
Source	Rating
Metacritic	69/100
Review scores
Source	Rating
AllMusic	4/5 stars
Attitude	4/5 stars
Belfast Telegraph	7/10
The Guardian	3/5 stars
Hot Press	9/10
Idolator	4/5
The Independent	3/5 stars
Metro	4/5 stars
NME	3/5 stars
The Times	3/5 stars
Evening Standard	4/5 stars

Kate Solomon from Metro pointed out that the album "hangs together better than last year's Glory Days but still ricochets wildly between styles. Some elements are pure Little Mix. Their lush harmonies permeate even the minimal half-rapped anthem 'Strip'." She further commented: "LM5 has a handful of songs destined to be hits and feels like a group of best friends welcoming you into their fold". Joe Passmore from Attitude started by saying, "Sounding 'more mature' is a common buzz-phrase for pop artists on the promotional circuit for a new album, but LM5 does make genuine effort to step away from the always infectious but often Disney-fied pop that we have come to expect from them", and added that the sound of this record "is more cohesive, polished and confident than their past two records in particular". Mike Nied from Idolator found the album "filled with creative risks", and stated that "Low on filler and high on quality pop that bridges a variety of sounds, LM5 is easily one of Little Mix's best releases to date", also considering it "perhaps their most ambitious". Michael Love Michael of Paper noted that the "resulting collection is arguably their most uplifting batch of songs yet".

Amy McMahon of Hot Press magazine gave LM5 nine out of a possible ten, appreciating the song "The National Manthem" by saying that it "showcases the girls' true talent. Stripped back, no catchy beat just beautiful harmonies. It also opens the album with a pledge to girlhood, setting the tone for the loud and proud feminist album that it is." She finally deemed the album as "made by empowered women to empower women". Hannah Mylrea of NME opined that the album was somewhat lacking in tunes but that "there are moments of pop sparkle" and that "lyrically [it's] the most mature they've ever been", concluding that the record "is the culmination of the band's growth over the past seven years. Yes it may sometimes musically miss the mark; but with its strong and relevant message it's something of a milestone for the band".

Alexis Petridis of The Guardian stated that the album "ticks most of modern pop's boxes" but felt that it was aimed at the US market and that "the group often sing not so much in an American accent but in a full-blown imitation of a deep south mumble rapper". According to Petridis, however, "LM5's flaws aren't really down to its US-focused slant... They're the classic flaws of today's pop albums: it's too long, its highlights appearing amid boilerplate filler... but the strike rate is high enough for LM5 to prolong Little Mix's career even further, at least in Britain." In The Guardian's sister paper, The Observer, Alim Kheraj also had mixed feelings, saying, "Little Mix albums have always struggled to find their own identity, and LM5 still owes too much to Beyoncé's flirtation with hip-hop and top-40 trend chasing. It's frustrating, because songs like 'Love a Girl Right' (which channels Ricky Martin, Sisqó and Mis-Teeq), the trip-hop of 'American Boy' and 'Strip''s stomps of stilettos are weird wonders that prove Little Mix can be a formidable pop force."

Alexandra Pollard of The Independent said that the album "hopscotches between genres with whiplash-inducing speed" and that "at points, the whole thing starts to feel a little derivative", concluding that "ultimately, despite a few high points, LM5 is so scattershot, both thematically and musically, that it's hard to find much to grab onto". Rachel Howdle from Belfast Telegraph gave the album a seven out of ten rating, stating that Little Mix "embraced the sound and feels of early 90's pop" and described parts of the album as "highly reminiscent of Janet Jackson".

== Commercial performance ==
In the United Kingdom the album peaked at number three on the UK Albums Chart, making Little Mix the first female group to score five consecutive top-five studio albums in the United Kingdom. In its release week it sold over 56,000 copies and was the most streamed album of that week. In Ireland it peaked at number two on the Irish Albums Chart, becoming the group's fourth top-five studio album there. It missed the number one spot by just six sales.

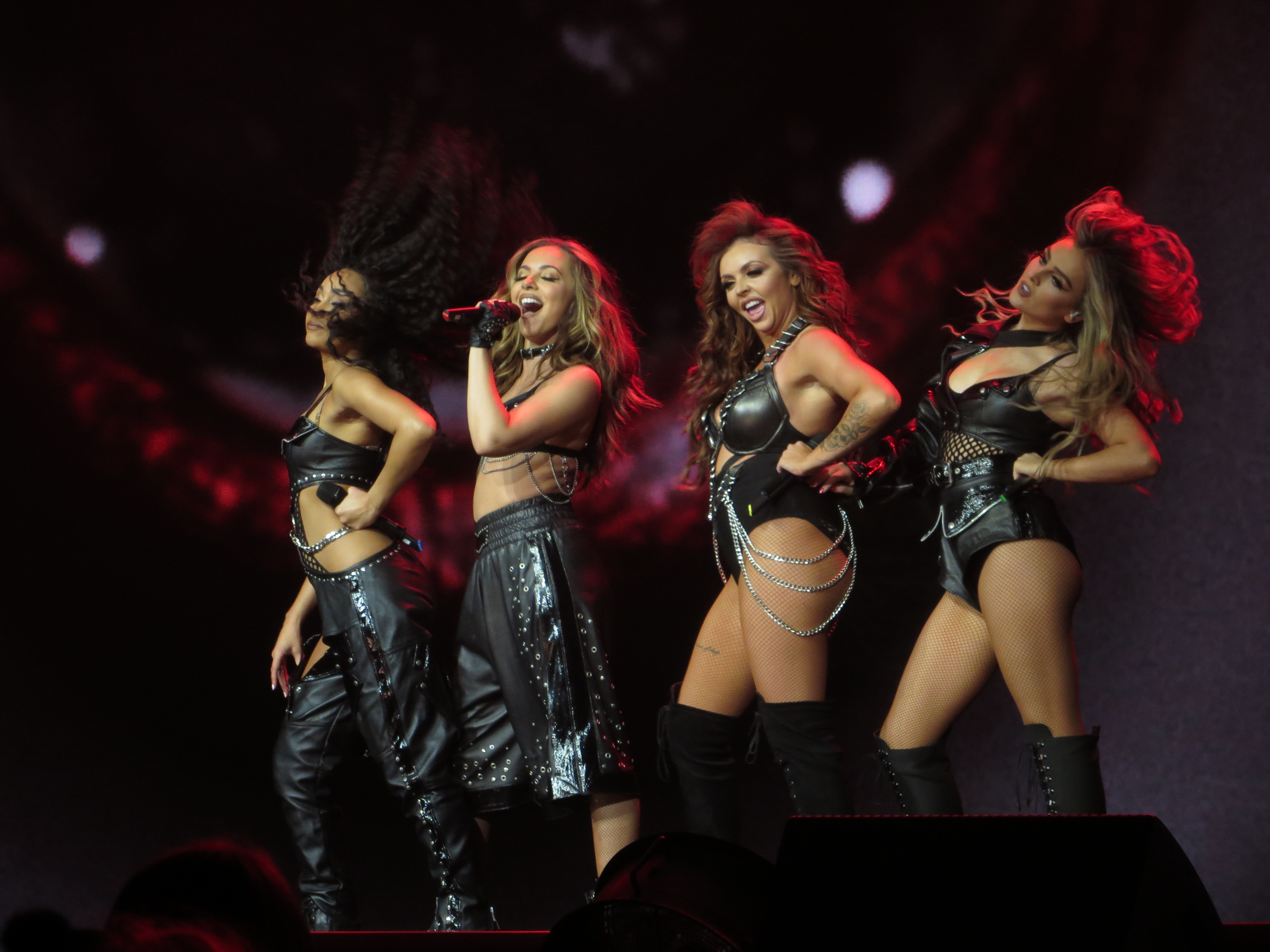
In 2018, Little Mix became the first girl group to have five consecutive top five albums in the UK.

Outside of the United Kingdom, the album charted inside the top ten in several other countries, including Spain, Australia, and Portugal. It charted inside the top-twenty in Greece, Denmark, Estonia, and debuted at number sixteen on the South Korean International Albums, becoming their first album to chart there. In the United States it debuted at number 40 on the US Billboard 200, and reached the top forty in nine other countries, and charted in an additional four others. LM5 has surpassed a billion streams on Spotify, making Little Mix the first girl group to have three or more albums receive over a billion streams each on the platform.

== Track listing ==
LM5
No.	Title	Writer(s)	Producer(s)	Length
1.	"The National Manthem"	Leigh-Anne Pinnock; Jade Thirlwall; James Abrahart; Sarah Hudson; Michael Woods; Kevin White	Joe Kearns	0:29
2.	"Woman Like Me" (featuring Nicki Minaj)	Jessica Glynne; Edward Sheeran; Steve McCutcheon; Onika Maraj	Steve Mac	3:49
3.	"Think About Us"	Camille Purcell; Linus Nordstrom; Frank Nobel	Goldfingers; Louis Bell; Kamille; Kearns^{[c]}	3:55
4.	"Strip" (featuring Sharaya J)	Pinnock; Thirlwall; Perrie Edwards; Jesy Nelson; Sharaya Howell; Christopher Crowhurst; Purcell	MNEK; Chris Loco; Kearns^{[c]}; Maegan Cottone^{[c]}	3:19
5.	"Monster in Me"	Purcell; Crowhurst; Nordstrom; Nobel; Anya Jones	Loco; Goldfingers; Matt Rad; Kamille^{[b]}; Cottone^{[c]}	3:45
6.	"Joan of Arc"	Pinnock; Thirlwall; Philip Plested; Patrick Patrikios; Hanni Ibrahim; Alexandra Shungudzo Govere	Loosechange	3:11
7.	"Love a Girl Right"	Pinnock; Thirlwall; Edwards; Nelson; Purcell; Crowhurst; Mark Andrews; Timothy Kelley; Robert Robinson; Robert Suarez; John Barrett; Marquis Collins; Joseph "Pal Joey" Longo III	Loco; Kearns^{[c]}; Jenna Andrews^{[c]}; Kamille^{[c]}	3:02
8.	"American Boy"	Richard Boardman; Pablo Bowman; Sarah Blanchard; Cleo Tighe; Rachel Furner	The Six; Bell; Aaron Hibell; Andrews^{[c]}	3:11
9.	"Told You So"	Rachel Keen; Uzoechi Emenike; Eyelar Mirzazadeh	MNEK; Kearns^{[c]}	3:12
10.	"Wasabi"	Thirlwall; Emenike; Mike Sabath; Govere	Sabath; John Hill^{[b]}; Kearns^{[c]}	2:34
11.	"More Than Words" (featuring Kamille)	Purcell; Timothy Mosley; Angel Lopez; Federico Vindver; Larrance Dopson; Anya Jones	Timbaland; Lopez; Vindver; Dopson; Kearns^{[c]}	3:18
12.	"Motivate"	Pinnock; Thirlwall; Edwards; Patrikios; Ibrahim; James Norton; Jenna Andrews; Javier Gonzalez	Loosechange; Yei; S1^{[b]}; Jameil Aossey^{[b]}; Lonestarrmuzik^{[b]}; Kearns^{[c]}; Andrews^{[c]}	3:21
13.	"Notice"	Pinnock; Thirlwall; Sabath; Govere	Sabath; Hill^{[b]}; Kearns^{[c]}; Andrews^{[c]}	3:34
14.	"The Cure"	Thomas Barnes; Peter Kelleher; Benjamin Kohn; Purcell	TMS; Andrews^{[c]}	3:35
Total length:				44:15

Deluxe edition
No.	Title	Writer(s)	Producer(s)	Length
15.	"Forget You Not"	Purcell; Anya Jones; Henrik Barman Michelsen; Edvard Forre Erfjord	Jorgan Odegard; Electric^{[b]}; Kamille^{[b]}; Kearns^{[c]}; Andrews^{[c]}	3:07
16.	"Woman's World"	Thirlwall; Furner; Jez Ashurst	Sam de Jong; Kearns^{[c]}; Cottone^{[c]}	3:37
17.	"The Cure" (stripped)	Barnes; Kelleher; Kohn; Purcell	TMS; Andrews^{[c]}	1:47
18.	"Only You" (with Cheat Codes)	Trevor Dahl; Kevin Ford; Matthew Russell; Boardman; Bowman; Nicholas Gale	Dahl; Digital Farm Animals; Cottone	3:09
Total length:				55:55

Japan edition
No.	Title	Writer(s)	Producer(s)	Length
19.	"Only You" (acoustic)	Dahl; Ford; Russell; Boardman; Bowman; Gale	Dahl; Digital Farm Animals; Cottone	3:09
Total length:				59:04

iTunes Store bonus video
No.	Title	Length
19.	"More Than Words" (featuring Kamille) (video)	3:19

== Charts ==
=== Weekly charts ===
Chart (2018)	Peak position
Australian Albums (ARIA)	8
Austrian Albums (Ö3 Austria)	21
Belgian Albums (Ultratop Flanders)	8
Belgian Albums (Ultratop Wallonia)	51
Canadian Albums (Billboard)	25
Czech Albums (ČNS IFPI)	28
Danish Albums (Hitlisten)	16
Dutch Albums (Album Top 100)	9
Estonian Albums (Eesti Ekspress)	16
French Albums (SNEP)	55
Finnish Albums (Suomen virallinen lista)	36
German Albums (Offizielle Top 100)	22
Greek Albums (IFPI)	19
Hungarian Albums (MAHASZ)	16
Irish Albums (IRMA)	2
Italian Albums (FIMI)	22
Japan Hot Albums (Billboard Japan)	56
Japanese Albums (Oricon)	60
Lithuanian Albums (AGATA)	7
New Zealand Albums (RMNZ)	6
Norwegian Albums (VG-lista)	32
Polish Albums (ZPAV)	42
Portuguese Albums (AFP)	11
Scottish Albums (Official Charts)	2
South Korean International Albums (Gaon)	16
Slovak Albums (ČNS IFPI)	31
Spanish Albums (Promusicae)	8
Swedish Albums (Sverigetopplistan)	28
Swiss Albums (Schweizer Hitparade)	22
UK Albums (Official Charts)	3
US Billboard 200	40

=== Year-end charts ===
Chart (2018)	Position
Belgian Albums (Ultratop Flanders)	185
Irish Albums (IRMA)	27
UK Albums (OCC)	25

Chart (2019)	Position
Belgian Albums (Ultratop Flanders)	143
UK Albums (OCC)	57

== Certifications ==
Region	Certification	Certified units/sales
Brazil (Pro-Música Brasil)	Platinum	40,000^{‡}
New Zealand (RMNZ)	Gold	7,500^{‡}
Poland (ZPAV)	Gold	10,000^{‡}
United Kingdom (BPI)	Platinum	340,000
United States	—	16,000
^{‡} Sales+streaming figures based on certification alone.

== Release history ==
Region	Date	Format	Label	Edition	Ref.
Various	16 November 2018	CD; digital download; streaming	Syco; Columbia	Standard; deluxe	
Various	7 December 2018	LP	Syco; Columbia	Standard	

== See also ==
- LM5: The Tour Film
- List of UK top-ten albums in 2018
