= Strip (Little Mix song) =

2018 song by Little Mix

Promotional single by Little Mix featuring Sharaya J

from the album LM5
- Released: 16 November 2018
- Length: 3:19
- Label: Syco
- Songwriters: Leigh-Anne Pinnock; Jade Thirlwall; Perrie Edwards; Jesy Nelson; Kamille; Chris Loco; Sharaya J
- Producers: Chris Loco; MNEK

Music video
- "Strip" on YouTube

"Strip" is a song by British girlgroup Little Mix featuring American rapper Sharaya J. It appears as the fourth track on Little Mix's fifth studio album LM5. The song was released as a promotional single from the album on 16 November 2018 alongside a music video.

The song was written by group members Jade Thirlwall, Leigh-Anne Pinnock, Perrie Edwards, and Jesy Nelson, alongside Kamille, Sharaya J, and the song's producer Chris Loco, with additional production by MNEK.

"Strip" peaked at number 25 on the UK Official Charts, and was ranked as their eighth best-selling non-single in the UK.

== Composition and background ==
The song was inspired by a conversation about the negative online comments the group had been receiving at the time as well as a news article "attacking" Thirlwall and Edwards' appearance. Co-writer Kamille recorded the conversation and played it back to the members, becoming the inspiration for the song's lyrics.

Originally, "Strip" was intended to be released as the first single from LM5, however after recording Woman Like Me and getting Nicki Minaj on the track, the group alongside the label decided on the latter as the first single to be released from the album.

== Music video ==
The "Strip" music video was shot on the 28 August 2018. It was directed by British Photographer and Director Rankin and co-directed by the four band members. The black and white video showcases the group, alongside a diverse group of women, such as Bryony Gordon, Hannah Witton, Kristin Hallenga, Alice Chater, and Nimco Ali, in a minimalistic setting, in which they emphasise natural beauty without any retouching or airbrushing.

As part of the video, the group posed naked with words like "fat", "ugly", "insignificant", and "talentless" written across their bodies - words that have been used to criticise them throughout their career.

== Social media campaign ==
After the release of the "Strip" music video and the accompanying imagery, Little Mix fans started a hashtag on social media called #StripWithLittleMix promoting body positivity, self love, and empowerment. Fans across the world began sharing photos of themselves to celebrate their individuality, share their insecurities and the things they love about themselves.

== Controversy ==
After the release of the nude promotional image for the video and song, Little Mix received mixed reactions. British broadcaster Piers Morgan accused the group of "stripping off to sell albums", airbrushing themselves, and calling them "fake". Despite this, the group was defended by numerous celebrities, including Ariana Grande and Lauren Jauregui from Fifth Harmony. Despite this, the group stood by their original message. When asked about the controversy in an interview, Jade said, "It's not about sexualising yourself; it's about having a voice and speaking out and being brave enough to stand up to people."

== Live performances ==
Little Mix performed "Strip" for the first time during their Little Mix: Live From London show in partnership with Apple Music on 13 November 2018, in which Sharaya J joined them on stage. During their LM5 Tour in late 2019, "Strip" was featured as part of an interlude, where their dancers performed a choreographed dance piece to the song.

== Credits and personnel ==
Credits adapted from Apple Music and Tidal

- Jade Thirlwall - vocals, songwriter, executive producer
- Leigh-Anne Pinnock - vocals, songwriter, executive producer
- Perrie Edwards - vocals, songwriter, executive producer
- Jesy Nelson - vocals, songwriter, executive producer
- Sharaya J - vocals, songwriter
- Kamille - songwriter, background vocals
- Chris Loco - songwriter, producer
- MNEK - producer
- Maegan Cottone - vocal producer
- Joe Kearns - vocal producer
- Jason Elliott - engineer
- Bill Zimmerman - assistant engineer
- Phil Tan - mixing engineer
- Randy Merrill - mastering engineer

== Charts ==
Chart (2018)	Peak position
Ireland (IRMA)	32
New Zealand Hot Singles (RMNZ)	4
Scotland (OCC)	32
UK Singles (OCC)	25
