= Kamille (musician) =

British singer (born 1988)

- Born: Camille Angelina Purcell; 29 June 1988 (age 38); Streatham, London, England
- Genres: Pop; R&B
- Occupations: Singer; songwriter; producer
- Instrument: Vocals
- Years active: 2008–present
- Labels: Virgin EMI; BMG Rights Management; Pure Cut
- Spouse: Tazer (m. 2021)

Camille Angelina Purcell (born 29 June 1988), known professionally as Kamille, is a British singer.

Kamille's co-writing and co-production contributions have accumulated to over 10 billion streams, as well as over 30 UK platinum certifications, 6 UK #1 singles, over 20 UK top 10 singles, #1 singles in over 15 countries and hundreds of hours of airplay on radio across the globe. She has also amassed over 117 million streams as an artist herself.

She has solidified herself as one of the UK's most successful songwriters, and has won several awards for her work, including a BRIT Award, two Grammy Awards, a Music Week Women in Music Award, and an Ivor Novello Award, becoming the youngest black female to receive the prestigious "Outstanding Song Collection" Award.

== Early life and career beginnings ==
Camille Angelina Purcell was born on 29 June 1988 in Streatham, London. She is of Jamaican and Cuban descent. Growing up Kamille felt she had "big shoes to fill" due to both of her parents being successful in their respective careers, with her mother being in receipt of an MBE and her father a successful business man. Kamille grew up singing and even attended the Sylvia Young Theatre School part-time on the weekends where she developed her singing, dancing and acting skills, however her parents always encouraged her to focus on her education. Following her parents advice, went on to gain a degree in economics, before working as a stockbroker.

Kamille started her songwriting career when she was introduced to a producer by a family friend and began spending time in a studio after work. She decided one day to leave her job on her lunch break and never went back. Months later in 2012, Kamille had her breakthrough when a song she had co-written, "What About Us", was pitched to Polydor Records and given to The Saturdays featuring Sean Paul. The track went straight to number one in the UK.

== Songwriting, production and Pure Cut ==
Following on from her success with "What About Us", Kamille began writing with artists such as Leona Lewis, Jessie J, JLS, and most notably Little Mix. In November 2013, Little Mix released their sophomore album Salute in which Kamille had co-written 3 songs. This began a long-term relationship between her and the girls which propelled them, and Kamille herself, to worldwide success. In 2015, Little Mix released the first single from their third album, "Black Magic", co-written by Kamille, which went straight to #1 in the UK and remained there for 3 weeks. This also gained Kamille her first Brit Award nomination for Best British Single in 2016. Later that year she wrote "Shout Out to My Ex", the first single from their 4th album, Glory Days. The track also 3 weeks at #1 in the UK and has since been certified 4× Platinum in the UK, becoming the first single by a girl group in a decade to achieve this milestone, and their most notable hit to date. The track won Kamille and Little Mix their first Brit Award in 2017, for Best British Single.

In total, she has written 32 songs for Little Mix, which have contributed to seven consecutive UK Top 5 albums and ten UK Top 20 singles. In 2018, Kamille wrote and featured on the song "More Than Words" from their fifth album, about their close relationship over the years of working together. She has been considered the group's unofficial 5th member, both publicly by Little Mix themselves, and by the national press.

Kamille has collaborated with countless other globally successful artists, achieving multiple successes. In 2018 she achieved two UK #1 singles back-to-back, first with "I'll Be There" co-written for Jess Glynne, immediately followed by "Solo" co-written for Clean Bandit featuring Demi Lovato, both of which were nominated for Best British Single at the 2019 Brit Awards. "Solo" was named the "most-Shazamed" song of 2018, and has since achieved over 1 billion streams on Spotify. Kamille's achievements were recognised at the A&R Awards 2018 where she won Songwriter of the Year.

In January 2019 Kamille co-wrote "Don't Call Me Up" for Mabel alongside Steve Mac. The song has become Mabel's most successful song to date. It peaked at #3 in the UK singles chart, was nominated for a Brit Award for Best British Single, it has achieved a 3× Platinum certification in the UK, and has amassed over 1 billion Spotify streams. The song finished as the 9th best-selling single for a female artist in the UK in 2019, and fourth best-selling by a female artist. Kamille has also co-written "Mad Love" and "Boyfriend" for Mabel which have both achieved Platinum UK certifications. She also appeared as a featured artist on Mabel's debut album High Expectations, singing a verse on the track "Selfish Love".

In November 2019 Kamille was further recognised for her "significant contribution to the making of music behind the scenes, through songwriting, studio production, or studio technology", when she was awarded the Music Creative Award at the Music Week Women in Music Awards.

Also in 2019, Kamille officially launched her record label and publishing company, Pure Cut. She cited fellow artist and businesswoman Beyoncé as an inspiration behind creation of the label, stating: "Seeing the empire Beyoncé's building now, it just cemented how I felt all along: that I want to be able to do that, and I want more for myself. I think that's driven me. What I want to do is be a helpful hand for artists with whatever they need, I can't have this knowledge and experience and not give that to others and share that with people. That's really where I'm coming from". Alongside the launch of Pure Cut, in 2020, Kamille built and launched her own recording studio called 'Saint Studios' situated within London's Metropolis Studios.

In 2020, Kamille co-wrote "Cool", the third track from Dua Lipa's second album Future Nostalgia, which was nominated for a Mercury Prize award. That year she also contributed to a further five UK Top 10 Singles. As well as co-writing, she also provided an uncredited vocal hook to Headie One, AJ Tracey and Stormzy's single "Ain't It Different", singing the lyrics to the sampled track "No Long Talking" by Lady Saw. The song also appeared on Headie One's album Edna which debuted at #1 in the UK Albums Chart.

2020 lead Kamille to take active steps in the music industry to promote opportunities for women in music. She took up a year-long mentorship of songwriter and producer Griff as part of the Ivors Academy Rising Star Award programme, and she teamed up with producer and songwriter Fred Again to launch the Next Up programme with She Is the Music to seek and mentor female producers.

In March 2021, Kamille won her first Grammy Award when Future Nostalgia won Best Pop Vocal Album at the 63rd Grammy Awards. She also received her sixth Brit Award nomination when "Ain't It Different" was nominated for Best British Single.

In September 2022, Kamille achieved her 6th UK Number 1 Single with David Guetta and Bebe Rexha's 'I'm Good (Blue) which also peaked at number 4 on the Billboard Hot 100 in the United States.

In 2023, she co-wrote 2 songs on Kylie Minogue's sixteenth studio album Tension which debuted at number 1 on the UK Albums Chart. This achievement marked Kamille's tenth UK Number 1 album as a credited songwriter.

In May 2023, she also received her first Ivor Novello award for Outstanding Song Collection, becoming the youngest Black woman to win the award.

In February 2024, Kamille received her 2nd Grammy Award for contributions towards Fred Again's studio album Actual Life 3 (January 1 – September 9 2022) which won Best Dance/Electronic Album.

== Artist career ==
In 2017, Kamille officially launched her career as an artist in her own right. She released her first single "Body" featuring Avelino in October. It was quickly followed by her debut EP My Head's a Mess on 17 November, released through Virgin records.

In March & April 2018, Kamille featured as a live solo artist for the first time when she opened for Jessie Ware on her UK Glasshouse Tour. In June 2018 she featured as the vocalist on Gorgon City & Ghosted's "Go Deep", and in July she released her new solo single "Emotional" featuring Kranium and Louis Rei. The song was later remixed to include verses from Chip and Stefflon Don.

Kamille featured as the live vocalist for British DJ Jax Jones, performing his song "Breathe" with him in the BBC Radio 1 Live Lounge, at the 2018 Jingle Bell Ball, held at the O2 Arena in London, and on the Christmas Edition of Top of the Pops in December 2018.

In 2019, Kamille focused her artist efforts on collaboration. She appeared as a featured artist on "My Love" with Dr Vades, as well as "Easy Loving You" on SG Lewis's EP Blue. She also collaborated with GRM Daily on the track "One More Night" featuring alongside Wretch 32 & WSTRN.

At the tail end of 2019, Kamille officially launched her record label and publishing company, Pure Cut. With herself as the first signing, her first Pure Cut release was single "Don't Answer" featuring Wiley. She then released her first Christmas single on the label, "Santa x4" featuring Next Town Down.

In November 2019 Kamille appeared alongside Little Mix for the first time as an artist when she joined the girls on stage for four nights of their LM5 Tour at the O2 Arena in London to perform "More Than Words" taken from the group's fifth album, LM5, including the final date which was filmed for LM5: The Tour Film.

In 2020, Kamille released singles, "Love + Attention" and "Somebody" featuring Ebenezer, as well as featuring as an artist on "Miss Jagger" with Lotto Boyzz.

In January 2021, Kamille released the single "AYO!" with S1mba. The music video for "AYO!" featured her new studio, Saint Studios, in the public eye for the first time. Her second single, "Mirror Mirror", was released in March 2021 alongside a music video with cameos from MNEK and Little Mix's Jade Thirlwall. The track went viral on TikTok, reaching #1 on the UK Hot 50 Chart and the associated hashtag #WhoTheBaddest being used over 68 million times.

Kamille provided the vocals for "Move" by Kingdom 93 & Goldfingers in May 2021, released on Warner Records.

In July, she released the song "Sad Party", featuring Haile and Ivorian Doll.

In 2022, Kamille released two singles, "Learning" and "Weight Loss".

On 12 May 2023, Kamille released "Muscle Memory", the lead single from her debut album, featuring Nile Rodgers. A month later, Kamille released "Options", featuring Tamera and Bellah. "Time To Kill", the third single from the album, was released in August 2023. On 8 September 2023, Kamille released her debut studio album, K1.

In May 2024, Kamille released "Headline", the first single from her anticipated second album, K2. The song was named BBC Radio 1's Tune of the Week the following month. In July, she released the second single, "Freak".

== Personal life ==
In June 2020, she became engaged to producer Tazer and the two married in August 2021, which was documented on Channel 4's documentary-reality TV series Highlife. Purcell gave birth to a son in April 2023.

== Discography ==
=== Studio albums ===
| Title | Details |
|---|---|
| K1 | Released: 8 September 2023; Label: Self-released; Format: Digital download |

=== Extended plays ===
| Title | Details |
|---|---|
| My Head's a Mess | Released: 17 November 2017; Label: Virgin EMI, UMG; Format: Digital download |

=== Singles ===
| Title | Year | Album |
|---|---|---|
| "Body" (featuring Avelino) | 2017 | My Head's a Mess |
| "Raindrops" | 2017 | My Head's a Mess |
| "Go Deep" (with Gorgon City and Ghosted) | 2018 | Escape |
| "Emotional" (featuring Kranium and Louis Rei (Wstrn)) | 2018 | Non-album singles |
| "My Love" (with Dr. Vades) | 2019 | Non-album singles |
| "Don't Answer" (featuring Wiley) | 2019 | Non-album singles |
| "Santa x4" (featuring Next Town Down) | 2019 | Non-album singles |
| "Love + Attention" | 2020 | Non-album singles |
| "Somebody" (featuring Ebenezer) | 2020 | Non-album singles |
| "AYO!" (featuring S1mba) | 2021 | Non-album singles |
| "Mirror Mirror" | 2021 | Non-album singles |
| "Sad Party" (featuring Haile and Ivorian Doll) | 2021 | Non-album singles |
| "Learning" | 2022 | Non-album singles |
| "Weight Loss" | 2022 | Non-album singles |
| "Muscle Memory" (featuring Nile Rodgers) | 2023 | K1 |
| "Options" (featuring Tamera and Bellah) | 2023 | K1 |
| "Time to Kill" | 2023 | K1 |
| "Manifesting - Pt. 2" (with Kojey Radical) | 2023 | Non-album single |
| "Headline" | 2024 | Non-album single |
| "Freak" | 2024 | Non-album single |
| "Happiness" (with Will Sass) | 2025 | Non-album single |
| "When I Lie" | 2025 | Non-album single |
| "Who Could Love You Like I Do?" | 2026 | Non-album single |
| "Together" | 2026 | Non-album single |

=== Guest appearances ===
| Title | Year | Other performer(s) | Album |
|---|---|---|---|
| "Anthem" | 2015 | Brookes Brothers | Non-album singles |
| "Get Some" | 2017 | Ghosted | Non-album singles |
| "More Than Words" | 2018 | Little Mix | LM5 |
| "Easy Loving You" | 2018 | SG Lewis | Blue - EP |
| "One More Night" | 2018 | GRM Daily, Wretch 32, WSTRN | Non-album single |
| "My Love" | 2018 | Dr Vades | Non-album single |
| "Selfish Love" | 2019 | Mabel | High Expectations |
| "Lifestyle" | 2020 | Tiësto | The London Sessions |
| "What's It Gonna Be" | 2020 | Tiësto | The London Sessions |
| "Miss Jagger" | 2020 | Lotto Boyzz | Non-album single |
| "Move" | 2021 | Kingdom 93, Goldfingers | Non-album single |
| "Kammy (like i do)" | 2022 | Fred Again | Actual Life 3 (January 1 - September 9, 2022) |

== Songwriting and production credits ==
indicates a background vocal contribution.

indicates an un-credited lead vocal contribution.

indicates a credited vocal/featured artist contribution.

^ indicates a production credit in addition to a songwriting credit

| Year | Artist | Album | Song | Co-written with |
|---|---|---|---|---|
| 2012 | Tinchy Stryder | Non-album single | "Help Me" | Kwasi Danquah III, Oliver Jacobs |
| 2012 | The Saturdays | Living for the Weekend | "What About Us" (solo or featuring Sean Paul) | Oliver Jacobs, Philip Jacobs, Sean Paul Henriques |
| 2013 | Jessie J | Alive | "Hero" | Jessica Cornish, Lorne Tennant, Marwan Bergamy, Meshak Moore |
| 2013 | Little Mix | Salute | "Nothing Feels Like You" | Perrie Edwards, Jessica Nelson, Leigh-Anne Pinnock, Jade Thirlwall, Uzoechi Emenike |
| 2013 | Little Mix | Salute | "Boy" | George Tizzard, Richard Parkhouse |
| 2013 | Little Mix | Salute | "Good Enough" | Perrie Edwards, Jessica Nelson, Leigh-Anne Pinnock, Jade Thirlwall, Thomas Barnes, Peter Kelleher, Benjamin Kohn |
| 2013 | JLS | Goodbye – The Greatest Hits | "Billion Lights" | Lorne Tennant, Daniel Lancaster, David Mespoulet, Sandy Vee |
| 2013 | Leona Lewis | Christmas, with Love | "Mr. Right" | Leona Lewis, Jez Ashurst, Ash Howes, Richard "Biff" Stannard |
| 2014 | Sam Bailey | The Power Of Love | "Treasure" | Bradford Ellis, Jez Ashurst, Richard "Biff" Stannard |
| 2014 | The Saturdays | Finest Selection: The Greatest Hits | "808" | Jamal Gure, George Tizzard, Richard Parkhouse |
| 2014 | Ella Henderson | Chapter One | "Glow" | Steve McCutcheon |
| 2014 | Ella Henderson | Chapter One | "Empire" | Gabriella Henderson, Thomas Barnes, Peter Kelleher, Benjamin Kohn |
| 2014 | Cheryl | Only Human | "Throwback" | Cheryl Tweedy, Nicola Roberts, George Tizzard, Richard Parkhouse |
| 2014 | Union J | You Got It All | "Song for You and I" | Matthew Schwartz, Joshua Wilkinson, James F. Reynolds |
| 2015 | Little Mix | Get Weird | "Black Magic" | Edward Drewett, Edvard Førre Erfjord, Henrik Barman Michelsen |
| 2015 | Andrea Faustini | Kelly | "Give a Little Love" | Andrea Faustini, Lee McCutcheon |
| 2015 | Little Mix | Get Weird | "Love Me Like You" | James Newman, Steve McCutcheon, Iain Farquharson |
| 2015 | Little Mix | Get Weird | "Weird People" | Edward Drewett, Edvard Førre Erfjord, Henrik Barman Michelsen |
| 2015 | Little Mix | Get Weird | "Hair" (solo or featuring Sean Paul) | Anita Blay, Iain Farquharson, Edvard Førre Erfjord, Henrik Barman Michelsen |
| 2015 | Little Mix | Get Weird | "Grown" | Perrie Edwards, Jessica Nelson, Leigh-Anne Pinnock, Jade Thirlwall, Jessica Glynne, Janee Bennett, Edvard Førre Erfjord, Henrik Barman Michelsen |
| 2015 | Little Mix | Get Weird | "I Love You" | Perrie Edwards, Jessica Nelson, Leigh-Anne Pinnock, Jade Thirlwall, Thomas Barnes, Peter Kelleher, Benjamin Kohn |
| 2015 | Little Mix | Get Weird | "The End" | (No additional writers) |
| 2015 | Little Mix | Get Weird | "The Beginning" | (No additional writers) |
| 2015 | Fleur East | Love, Sax and Flashbacks | "Sax" | Fleur East, James Abrahart, Edvard Førre Erfjord, Henrik Barman Michelsen |
| 2015 | Fleur East | Love, Sax and Flashbacks | "More and More" | Fleur East, James Abrahart, Edvard Førre Erfjord, Henrik Barman Michelsen |
| 2015 | Fleur East | Love, Sax and Flashbacks | "Gold Watch" | Fleur East, Edward Drewett, Thomas Barnes, Peter Kelleher, Benjamin Kohn |
| 2016 | LuvBug | Non-album single | "Best is Yet to Come" | Roy Stride, Steve McCutcheon |
| 2016 | Olly Murs | 24 HRS | "You Don't Know Love" | Oliver Murs, Wayne Hector, Steve Robson |
| 2016 | Olly Murs | 24 HRS | "Grow Up" | Oliver Murs, Wayne Hector, Steve Robson |
| 2016 | Little Mix | Glory Days | "Shout Out to My Ex" | Perrie Edwards, Jessica Nelson, Leigh-Anne Pinnock, Jade Thirlwall, Iain Farquharson, Edvard Førre Erfjord, Henrik Barman Michelsen |
| 2016 | Sigma | Non-album single | "Find Me" (featuring Birdy) | Cameron Edwards, Joseph Lenzie, Jasmine van den Bogaerde, Thomas Barnes, Peter Kelleher, Benjamin Kohn |
| 2016 | Little Mix | Glory Days | "Power" | James Abrahart, Daniel Omelio |
| 2016 | Little Mix | Glory Days | "Your Love" | James Abrahart, Jeremy Coleman |
| 2016 | Little Mix | Glory Days | "Nothing Else Matters" | Wayne Hector, Daniel Heloy Davidsen, Peter Wallevik, Mich Hansen |
| 2016 | Little Mix | Glory Days | "Beep Beep" | Iain Farquharson, Edvard Førre Erfjord, Henrik Barman Michelsen |
| 2017 | Neiked | Non-album single | "Call Me" (featuring Mimi) | Victor Radstrom, Geraldo Sandell, Alexander Papaconstantinou, Viktor Svensson, Steve Robinson, Mimmi Linnea Sanden |
| 2017 | The Script | Freedom Child | "Rain" | Daniel O'Donoghue, Mark Sheehan, James Barry |
| 2017 | Ghosted | Non-album single | "Get Some" (featuring Kamille) | Thomas Barnes, Peter Kelleher, Benjamin Kohn |
| 2017 | CNCO | CNCO | "Reggaetón Lento" (Remix) (with Little Mix) | Luis Angel O'Neill, Jadan Andino, Eric Pérez, Jorge Class, Jean Rodriguez |
| 2017 | The Script | Freedom Child | "No Man is an Island" | Daniel O'Donoghue, Mark Sheehan, James "Jimbo" Barton |
| 2017 | Kideko | Non-album single | "Dum Dum" (with Tinie Tempah and Becky G) | Ryan Hurley, Timothy Powell |
| 2017 | Syn Cole | Non-album single | "Got the Feeling" (featuring Kirstin) | Rene Pais, Grace Barker, Steve Robson |
| 2018 | Don Diablo | FUTURE | "Give Me Love" (featuring Calum Scott) | Don Schipper, Martijn van Sonderen, Andrew Bullimore, Victor Bolander, Linus Nordstrom, Calum Scott |
| 2018 | MIST | Diamond In The Dirt | "Wish Me Well" (featuring Jessie Ware) | Rhys Sylvester, Shah Naseem, Jessica Ware |
| 2018 | Louisa | Non-album single | "Yes" (featuring 2 Chainz) | Andrew Bullimore, Christopher Crowhurst, Frank Nobel, Linus Nordstrom, Matthew Radosevich, Tauheed Epps |
| 2018 | Wild Youth | Non-album single | "Can't Move On" | Conor O'Donohoe, Daniel O'Donoghue, Mark Sheehan |
| 2018 | Jess Glynne | Always In Between | "I'll Be There" | Jessica Glynne, Jerker Hansson, Finlay Dow-Smith, Edvard Førre Erfjord, Henrik Barman Michelsen |
| 2018 | Clean Bandit | What Is Love? | "Solo" (featuring Demi Lovato) | Jack Patterson, Grace Chatto, Fredrik Gibson, Demetria Lovato |
| 2018 | Jax Jones | Snacks EP | "Ring Ring" (featuring Mabel and Rich the Kid) | Timucin Aluo, Uzoechi Emenike, Mark Ralph, Mabel McVey, Marlon McVey-Roudette |
| 2018 | James Arthur | Non-album single | "You Deserve Better" | James Arthur, Thomas Barnes, Peter Kelleher, Benjamin Kohn |
| 2018 | Marc E. Bassy | Postmodern Depression | "Right Now" | Marc Griffin, David Park, Nicholas Balding, James Alexander Hau |
| 2018 | Olly Murs | You Know I Know | "Love Me Again" | Oliver Murs, Wayne Hector, Steve Robson |
| 2018 | Little Mix | LM5 | "Think About Us"^ | Frank Nobel, Linus Nordstrom |
| 2018 | Little Mix | LM5 | "Strip" (featuring Sharaya J) | Leigh-Anne Pinnock, Jade Thirlwall, Perrie Edwards, Jessica Nelson, Christopher Crowhurst, Sharaya Howell |
| 2018 | Little Mix | LM5 | "Monster in Me" | Arya Jones, Christopher Crowhurst, Frank Nobel, Linus Nordstrom |
| 2018 | Little Mix | LM5 | "Love a Girl Right" | Leigh-Anne Pinnock, Jade Thirlwall, Perrie Edwards, Jessica Nelson, Christopher Crowhurst, Robert Suarez, John Barrett, Joseph Longo III, Timothy Kelley, Robert Robinson, Mark Andrews, Markquis Collins |
| 2018 | Little Mix | LM5 | "More Than Words" (featuring Kamille) | Anya Jones, Timothy Mosley, Angel Lopez, Federico Vindver, Larrance Dopson |
| 2018 | Little Mix | LM5 | "The Cure" | Thomas Barnes, Peter Kelleher, Benjamin Kohn |
| 2018 | Little Mix | LM5 | "Forget You Not" | Anya Jones, Edvard Førre Erfjord, Henrik Barman Michelsen |
| 2018 | Clean Bandit | What Is Love? | "Baby" (featuring Marina and Luis Fonsi) | Jack Patterson, Jason Evigan, Marina Diamandis, Matthew Knott, Luis Lopez-Cepero |
| 2018 | Boyzone | Thank You & Goodnight | "Tongue Tied" (featuring Alesha Dixon) | David Ezra, Andrew Bullimore, Frank Nobel, Linus Nordstrom |
| 2018 | Boyzone | Thank You & Goodnight | "Loaded Gun" | Edward Drewett, Daniel Heloy Davidsen, Peter Wallevik, Mich Hansen |
| 2019 | Mabel | High Expectations | "Don't Call Me Up" | Mabel McVey, Steve McCutcheon |
| 2019 | Wild Youth | The Last Goodbye - EP | "Close" | Conor O'Donohoe, Daniel O'Donoghue, Mark Sheehan, James Barry |
| 2019 | Europa | Non-album single | "All Day and Night" (featuring Madison Beer) | Timucin Aluo, Martin Picandet, Hailee Steinfeld, Janee Bennett, Rebecca Hill, Mark Ralph |
| 2019 | Mabel | High Expectations | "Mad Love" | Mabel McVey, Steve McCutcheon |
| 2019 | SG Lewis | Dawn - EP | "Easy Loving You" (featuring Kamille) | Samuel George Lewis, Benjamin Ash |
| 2019 | Jax Jones | Snacks | "Harder" (with Bebe Rexha) | Timucin Aluo, Steve McCutcheon, Bleta Rexha |
| 2019 | Mabel | High Expectations | "Selfish Love" (featuring Kamille) | Mabel McVey, Fraser Thornycroft-Smith |
| 2019 | RITUAL | Non-album single | "Hard Times" (with Robinson) | Adam Midgley, Thomas Baxtor, Gerard O'Connell |
| 2019 | The Script | Sunsets & Full Moons | "The Hurt Game" | Daniel O'Donoghue, Mark Sheehan |
| 2019 | Westlife | Spectrum | "L.O.V.E." | Markus Feehily, Shane Filan, Steve McCutcheon |
| 2019 | Westlife | Spectrum | "Take Me There" | Markus Feehily, Shane Filan, Steve Mac |
| 2019 | Mabel | Non-album single | "Loneliest Time of Year" | Mabel McVey, MNEK, Tre Jean-Marie, Nayla Nyassa |
| 2019 | Raye | Euphoric Sad Songs | "Please Don't Touch" | Raye, Fraser T. Smith |
| 2020 | Sia | Music – Songs from and Inspired by the Motion Picture | "Hey Boy" | Sia Furler, Jesse Shatkin |
| 2020 | AJ Tracey & Mabel | High Expectations | "West Ten" | AJ Tracey, FRED, Mabel McVey, Take A Daytrip |
| 2020 | Mabel | High Expectations | "Boyfriend" | Mabel McVey, Marlena Shaw, Richard Evans, Robert Miller, Steve Mac |
| 2020 | Dua Lipa | Future Nostalgia | "Cool" | Dua Lipa, Tove Lo, Shakka Philip, Ben Kohn, Tom Barnes, Pete Kelleher |
| 2020 | Little Mix | Confetti | "Break Up Song"^ | Jade Thirlwall, Perrie Edwards, Leigh-Anne Pinnock, Frank Nobel, Linus Nordstrom |
| 2020 | Little Mix | Confetti | "Holiday"^ | Jade Thirlwall, Perrie Edwards, Leigh-Anne Pinnock, Chris Loco, Frank Nobel, Linus Nordstorm |
| 2020 | Little Mix | Confetti | "Confetti" | Ben Kohn, Maegan Cottone, Peter Kelleher, Tom Barnes, Uzoechi Emenike |
| 2020 | Little Mix | Confetti | "Happiness" | Ben Kohn, Peter Kelleher, Tom Barnes, Uzoechi Emenike |
| 2020 | Little Mix | Confetti | "My Love Won't Let You Down"^ | Frank Nobel, James Abrahart, Linus Nordstrom |
| 2020 | Little Mix | Confetti | "If You Want My Love"^ | Andrew Bullimore, Frank Nobel, Linus Nordstrom |
| 2020 | Little Mix | Confetti | "Breathe"^ | Cass Lowe, George Astasio, Jason Pebworth, Jon Shave |
| 2020 | Mabel & Clean Bandit | Non-album single | "Tick Tock" | Golden Landis Von Jones, Grace Chatto, Jack Patterson, Mabel McVey |
| 2020 | Headie One, Stormzy & AJ Tracey | Edna | "Ain't It Different" | AJ Tracey, Anthony Kiedis, Chad Smith, Fred Gibson, Gary Jackson, Irving Adjei, John Frusciante, Marion Hall, Michael Balzary, Michael Omari, Steve Marsden, Toddla T |
| 2020 | Marisha Wallace | Tomorrow | "Divine" | Steve Mac |
| 2021 | Fredo | Money Can't Buy Happiness | "Ready" (featuring Summer Walker) | Eddie Serafica, Enya, James Murray, Kyle Evans, Marvin Bailey, Mustafa Omer, Nicky Ryan, Roma Ryan, Thom Bell, William Hart |
| 2021 | Zara Larsson | Poster Girl | "Look What You've Done" | Max Wolfgang, Steve Mac, Ammar Malik, Zara Larsson |
| 2021 | Zara Larsson | Poster Girl | "I Need Love" | Fin Dow-Smith, Joe Kearns |
| 2021 | JJ Lin | Like You Do | "Bedroom" (featuring Anne-Marie) | Anne-Marie Nicholson, Ben Kohn, Pete Kelleher, Tom Barnes |
| 2021 | Little Mix | Confetti | "Confetti" (featuring Saweetie) | Ben Kohn, Pete Kelleher, Tom Barnes, Uzoechi Emenike, Diamonte Harper, Maegan Cottone |
| 2021 | Sia | Non-album single | "Hey Boy" (featuring Burna Boy) | Damini Ebunoluwa Ogulu, Jesse Shatkin, Sia Furler |
| 2021 | Anne-Marie | Therapy | "Kiss My (Uh Oh)" (with Little Mix) | Anne-Marie Nicholson, Uzoechi Emenike, Pete Nappi, Raye, Upsahl, Edwin Perez, Jacob Benfield, Lumidee Cedeno, Steven Marsden, Teddy Mendez |
| 2021 | Anne-Marie | Therapy | "Unlovable" (with Rudimental) | Anne-Marie Nicholson, Tre Jean-Marie, Uzoechi Emenike, Nathan Dawe |
| 2021 | Anne-Marie | Therapy | "Better Not Together" | Anne-Marie Nicholson, Tre Jean-Marie, Uzoechi Emenike, Nathan Dawe |
| 2021 | Joel Corry & Jax Jones | Non-album single | "Out Out" (featuring Charli XCX & Saweetie) | Amber Van Day, Charlotte Aitchison, Diamonte Harper, Janee Jin Jin Bennett, Lewis Thompson, Neave Applebaum, Rory, Tayla Parx, Jax Jones, Joel Corry, Låpsley, Nono, Paul Van Haver |
| 2021 | Mahalia | Non-album single | "Roadside" (featuring AJ Tracey) | Keven Wolfsohn, Paul Goller, Abby-Lynn Keen, Luke Grieve, Mahalia Burkmar, Che Wolton Grant |
| 2021 | Little Mix | Between Us | "No" | Tre Jean-Marie, Uzoechi Emenike, Jade Thirlwall, Leigh-Anne Pinnock, Perrie Edwards |
| 2021 | Little Mix | Between Us | "Trash" | Tre Jean-Marie, Uzoechi Emenike, Mabel Mcvey |
| 2022 | Nicôle Lecky | Mood (Original Soundtrack From The BBC Series) | "Fire" | Kwame "KZ" Kwei-Armah Jr., Nicôle Lecky |
| 2022 | Nicôle Lecky | Mood (Original Soundtrack From The BBC Series) | "Life Is Shit" | Kwame "KZ" Kwei-Armah Jr., Nicôle Lecky |
| 2022 | Nicôle Lecky | Mood (Original Soundtrack From The BBC Series) | "Trouble" | Kwame "KZ" Kwei-Armah Jr., Nicôle Lecky |
| 2022 | Sara Deop | Non-album single | "Make You Say" | Leroy Sanchez, Linus Nordstrom, Victor Bolander |
| 2022 | Mabel | About Last Night... | "Good Luck" (with Jax Jones & Galantis) | Tre Jean-Marie, Uzoechi Emenike, Christian Karlsson, Jordi de Fluiter, Mabel Mcvey, Tomi, Timucin Lan |
| 2022 | Robin Schulz & Tom Walker | Non-album single | "Sun Will Shine" | Ammar Malik, Steve Mac, Junkx, Robin Schulz, Tom Walker |
| 2022 | Fred Again | Actual Life 3 (January 1 - September 9, 2022) | Mustafa (Time to Move You) | Angie McMahon, Aubrey Graham, Clara Singers, Delilah Montagu, Dermot Kennedy, Fred Gibson, Giampaolo Parisi, Jerermy Biddle, Kelly Zutrau, Kyle Myhre, Marco Parisi, Mustafa Ahmed, Nat Rhoads |
| 2022 | Nathan Dawe & Talia Mar | Non-album single | "Sweet Lies" | Tre Jean-Marie, Uzoechi Emenike, Daniel Langsman, Nathan Dawe, Stephen Meade, Tyler Hotston |
| 2022 | David Guetta & Bebe Rexha | Bebe | "I'm Good (Blue)" | Bebe Rexha, David Guetta, Phil Plested, Gianfranco Randone, Massimo Gabutti, Maurizio Lobina |
| 2023 | Mimi Webb | Amelia | "Amelia" | Mimi Webb, Nick Gale, Pablo Bowman, Rick Boardman |
| 2023 | Flo | Non-album single | "Fly Girl" (featuring Missy Elliott) | Jacob Jones, Taras Slusarenko, Tre Jean-Marie, Christopher Stain, Corte Ellis, Darryl McDaniels, Gabriel Kusimo, Jamal Woon, Jorja Douglas, Joseph Simmons, Julian Downer, Missy Elliott, Paul Simon, Bella Quaresma |
| 2023 | Freya Ridings | Blood Orange | "Blood Orange" | Freya Ridings, Will Bloomfield |
| 2023 | Freya Ridings | Blood Orange | "Bite Me" | Freya Ridings, Will Bloomfield |
| 2023 | Anne-Marie | Unhealthy | "Trainwreck" | Anne-Marie Nicholson, Phil Plested, Sam Brennan, Tom Hollings |
| 2023 | Anne-Marie | Unhealthy | "You & I" (featuring Khalid) | Anne-Marie Nicholson, Conor Blake, James Murray, Mustafa Omer, Khalid Robinson |
| 2023 | Kylie Minogue | Tension | "Tension" | Kylie Minogue, Anya Jones, Jon Green, Richard Stannard, Duck Blackwell |
| 2023 | Kylie Minogue | Tension | "Things We Do For Love" | Kylie Minogue, Anya Jones, Jon Green, Richard Stannard, Duck Blackwell |
| 2024 | Say Now | Non-album single | "Bitch Get Out My Car" | Amelia Onuorah, Ysabelle Salvanera, Madeleine Haynes, Duck Blackwell, Anya Jones, Richard Stannard |
| 2024 | Alok & Jess Glynne | Non-album single | "Summer's Back" | Marli Harwood, Erik Smaaland, Ida Botten, Alok Petrillo, Jessica Glynne, Janée Bennett, Kristoffer Tømmerbakke, Mark Brydon, Ohyes, Róisín Murphy |
| 2024 | Clean Bandit, Anne-Marie & David Guetta | Non-album single | "Cry Baby" | Anne-Marie Nicholson, Jack Patterson, Steve Mac |
| 2024 | Tzuyu | Aboutzu | "One Love" | Richard Parkhouse, George Tizzard |
| 2024 | Confidence Man & Sweetie Irie | 3AM (La La La) | "Real Move Touch" | Grace Stephenson, Lewis Stephenson, Dean Bent, Aidan Moore |
| 2025 | Sam Ryder | Heartland | "Oh Ok" | Sam Ryder, Steve Mac |
| 2025 | Twice | This Is For | "Mars" | Perrie Edwards, Sam Roman, Will Bloomfield |
| 2026 | Jessie Ware | Superbloom | "Automatic" | Jessie Ware, Sam Knowles, Baz Kaye, Peter Brien, Les Baxter |

== Awards ==
| Year | Nominee / Work | Award | Result |
|---|---|---|---|
| 2013 | Herself | ASCAP - "Foundation Stone Award" | Won |
| 2016 | Little Mix - "Black Magic" | Brit Award - "Best British Single" | Nominated |
| 2016 | Herself | A&R Awards - "Songwriter of the Year" | Nominated |
| 2017 | Herself (for contributions to "Black Magic") | BMI - "Pop Award" | Won |
| 2017 | Little Mix - "Shout Out to My Ex" | Brit Award - "British Single of the Year" | Won |
| 2017 | Herself | A&R Awards - "Songwriter of the Year" | Nominated |
| 2018 | Little Mix - "Power" feat. Stormzy | Global Awards - "Best Song" | Won |
| 2018 | Herself | A&R Awards - "Songwriter of the Year" | Won |
| 2019 | Jess Glynne - "I'll Be There" | Brit Award - "Best British Single" | Nominated |
| 2019 | Clean Bandit - "Solo" feat. Demi Lovato | Brit Award - "Best British Single" | Nominated |
| 2019 | Herself | Music Week Women in Music Awards - "Music Creative" | Won |
| 2019 | Herself | A&R Awards - "Songwriter of the Year" | Nominated |
| 2020 | Mabel - "Don't Call Me Up" | Brit Award - "Song of the Year" | Nominated |
| 2020 | Herself (for contributions to "Don't Call Me Up") | BMI - "Pop Award" | Won |
| 2020 | Dua Lipa - "Future Nostalgia" | Hyundai Mercury Prize | Nominated |
| 2021 | Dua Lipa - "Future Nostalgia" | 63rd Grammy Awards - "Album of the Year" | Nominated |
| 2021 | Dua Lipa - "Future Nostalgia" | 63rd Grammy Awards - "Pop Vocal Album" | Won |
| 2021 | Headie One, AJ Tracey, Stormzy - "Ain't It Different" | Brit Award - "Best British Single" | Nominated |
| 2021 | Herself | Ivor Novello Awards - "Songwriter of the Year" | Nominated |
| 2021 | Herself | A&R Awards - "Producer of the Year" | Nominated |
| 2021 | Herself | A&R Awards - "Songwriter of the Year" | Nominated |
| 2022 | Herself | A&R Awards - "Producer of the Year" | Nominated |
| 2022 | Herself | A&R Awards - "Songwriter of the Year" | Nominated |
| 2023 | David Guetta and Bebe Rexha | Brit Award - "International Song of the Year" | Nominated |
| 2023 | Herself | Ivor Novello Awards - "Outstanding Song Collection" | Won |
| 2023 | Herself | A&R Awards - "Songwriter of the Year" | Nominated |
| 2023 | Herself (for contributions to "I'm Good (Blue)") | BMI Awards - "Most Performed Songs" | Won |
| 2024 | Fred Again - Actual Life 3 (January 1 – September 9 2022) | Grammy Awards - Best Dance/Electronic Album | Won |
| 2024 | Herself | Music Business Awards (A&R Awards) - "Songwriter of the Year" | Nominated |
