= 2019 Global Awards =

- Date: 7 March 2019
- Venue: Hammersmith Apollo
- Country: United Kingdom
- Hosted by: Roman Kemp, Rochelle Humes and Myleene Klass
- Most awards: Dua Lipa, Mark Ronson, Little Mix (2)
- Most nominations: Little Mix (4)

Television/radio coverage
- Network: Capital FM; Heart FM; The Capital FM Website; The Heart FM Website

The 2019 Global Awards ceremony was held on Thursday, 7 March 2019 at London's Eventim Apollo and was sponsored by very.co.uk.

Roman Kemp, Rochelle Humes and Myleene Klass returned to host for the second year.

Performances and special appearances included Little Mix, Lang Lang, Blossoms, Anne-Marie, Mark Ronson and Mabel.

== Performances ==
Order	Artist	Song(s)
1	Anne-Marie	"Friends" & "2002"
2	Mabel	"Fine Line" & "Don't Call Me Up"
3	Lang Lang	"Für Elise"
4	Blossoms	"I Can't Stand It" & "Charlemagne"
5	Little Mix	"Woman Like Me" & "Think About Us"
6	Mark Ronson	"Nothing Breaks Like a Heart", "Electricity", "Ooh Wee", "Shallow (Remix)", "Valerie" & "Uptown Funk"

== Nominees and winners ==
The list of nominees was announced in December 2018. Winners are listed first, in bold.

Best Song with Metro (Public Vote) (Presented by Fleur East and Harry Redknapp)	Best Group (Public Vote) (Presented by Cheryl and Anne-Marie)
**Little Mix feat. Nicki Minaj – "Woman Like Me"**; 5 Seconds of Summer – "Youngblood"; Ariana Grande – "no tears left to cry"; Lady Gaga feat. Bradley Cooper – "Shallow"; Shawn Mendes – "In My Blood"	**Little Mix**; 5 Seconds of Summer; Arctic Monkeys; Maroon 5; Take That
The LBC Award (Public Vote)	Rising Star Award (Public Vote)
**Steve Allen**	**Halsey**; Ava Max; Ella Mai; Keala Settle; Rak-Su
Social Media Superstar (Public Vote) (Presented by Will Manning and Mabel)	Best RnB, Hip Hop or Grime (Public Vote) (Presented by Yinka and Semtex)
**Joe Sugg**; Cardi B; Collen Ballinger; Halsey; Zara Larsson	**Khalid**; Drake; Ella Mai; Travis Scott; Tyga
Best Male	Best Female (Presented by Vick Hope and Olly Murs)
**Mark Ronson**; Calvin Harris; Liam Payne; Olly Murs; Post Malone	**Dua Lipa**; Anne-Marie; Ariana Grande; Halsey; Jess Glynne
Best Classical Artist	Best British Artist or Group (Presented by Martin Kemp and Shirley Kemp)
**Nicola Benedetti**; Bryn Terfel; Jess Gillam; Lang Lang; Sheku Kanneh-Mason	**Dua Lipa**; Anne-Marie; Jess Glynne; Little Mix; Rudimental
Mass Appeal Award (Presented by Emma Bunton and John Newman)	Most Played Song
**Lady Gaga**; Jess Glynne; Olly Murs; Sam Smith; Take That	**Rudimental feat. Jess Glynne, Macklemore & Dan Caplen – These Days**
Best Indie	Best Pop
**Blossoms**; Arctic Monkeys; Florence and the Machine; Jade Bird; Stereophonics	**Anne-Marie**; 5 Seconds Of Summer; Dua Lipa; Liam Payne; Little Mix
The Global Special Award (Presented by Dua Lipa)	The Very Award (Presented by Kate Garraway)
**Mark Ronson**	**Joshua Hill**

== Multiple awards and nominations ==
- Artists with the most nominations

Four:

- Little Mix

Three:

- Jess Glynne
- Dua Lipa
- 5 Seconds of Summer
- Halsey

- Artists that received multiple awards

Two:

- Dua Lipa
- Mark Ronson
- Little Mix
