= Only You (Cheat Codes and Little Mix song) =

2018 song

Single by Cheat Codes and Little Mix
- Released: June 22, 2018
- Length: 3:09
- Label: 300 Entertainment; Syco
- Songwriters: Pablo Bowman; Trevor Dahl; KEVI; Matthew Russell; Nicholas Gale; Richard Boardman
- Producers: Digital Farm Animals; Maegan Cottone; Trevor Dahl

Cheat Codes singles chronology
"I Love It" (2018)	"Only You" (2018)	"Home" (2018)

Little Mix singles chronology
"Reggaetón Lento (Remix)" (2017)	"Only You" (2018)	"Woman Like Me" (2018)

Music video
- "Only You" on YouTube

"Only You" is a song by American-British electronic music trio Cheat Codes and British girl group Little Mix. It was released on June 22, 2018, as a single through Syco Music and 300 Entertainment. The song was written by Richard Boardman, Pablo Bowman, the three members of Cheat Codes (Trevor Dahl, Kevin Ford, and Matthew Russell), and Digital Farm Animals (Nicholas Gale), and was produced by Dahl and Digital Farm Animals, along with Maegan Cottone . The song featured on the Ministry of Sound compilation album The Pool Party, and later on the deluxe edition of Little Mix's fifth studio album LM5 (2018), and the acoustic version appears on the Japanese edition of the album.

"Only You" was met with positive reviews from critics. The song's lyrics are about missing a special someone in your life. A music video was later released and features a same sex couple with an LGBTQ+ themed storyline.

"Only You" reached the top ten in Hungary. The song peaked at number fifteen on the UK Singles Chart, and reached the charts in thirteen other territories including France, Ireland and Australia. It has since received two platinum and two gold music certifications. Little Mix performed the song at the 2018 Jingle Bell Ball, BBC Teen Awards, and on tour, the most recent being The Confetti Tour in 2022.

== Background ==
The song was written by Pablo Bowman, Nicholas Gale and Richard Boardman, with production by Digital Farm Animals, Maegan Cottone. The song was revealed in June 2018 with its inclusion on The Pool Party album, which accompanied the television series Love Island. Snippets of the song were teased by Cheat Codes and Little Mix prior to the song's release. Cheat Codes and Little Mix announced on Twitter that the song would be released on June 22, 2018. The song's picture cover was released a day later along with some leaked lyrics.

== Composition ==
"Only You" is a midtempo EDM song, backed by an acoustic guitar, that runs for three-minutes and nine seconds. It includes elements of electronic, tropical house and ambient. It contains backing vocals by the members of Cheat Codes. All the lyrics are structured in verse–pre-chorus–chorus which contain no vocals but instead an instrumental. Lyrically it is about love and post-breakup phase of a relationship.

== Music video ==
The music video for the song was released on July 12, 2018, on Little Mix's official YouTube channel. The video features an LGBTQ+ storyline between two girls (played by Lisa Starrett and Peyton List) at a house party, one of whom turns out to be a mermaid. The video was directed by Frank Borin.

=== Synopsis ===
The plot shows a girl (played by Lisa), picking clothes for a party and it later shows her arriving and has trouble interacting with the others and she decides to sit on the couch. Meanwhile, a mysterious girl (played by Peyton) is seen hiding in the bushes and runs and takes a nearby yellow jacket and runs off and enters the party and Lisa and Peyton lock eyes and decide to dance and seen having fun together at the party, such as conversations, games and dancing. Then a group of other girls show up interrupting the two. One specific girl notices Peyton has her jacket. Angry, she pushes Peyton in the pool and she doesn't show up for a while. Worried, Lisa jumps in the pool to save her and find out she is okay and they kiss. It then shows the two kissing on the party while also showing the shocking discovery of Peyton being the mermaid. It then shows Lisa carrying Peyton to the ocean while also showing scenes of their greatest times and Lisa kneels on the beach sunrise where Peyton is, having to let her go.

== Critical reception ==
MTV called the song a "sun-tinged tune". They also said that it was "so good" to finally have the girls back again. Kat Bein from Billboard said: "It's most certainly a summer-made single, dripping in youthful romantic sentiments with an acoustic foundation".

== Live performances ==
The band made a televised debut of the song on October 21, 2018, at the 2018 BBC Radio 1's Teen Awards, where they also won the Best British Group award.

== Credits and personnel ==
Credits adapted from Tidal.

Personnel

- Electric – songwriter, producer, engineer, instruments, programming
- Pablo Bowman, Trevor Dahl, Nicholas Gale and Richard Boardman – songwriter
- Digital Farm Animals, Maegan Cottone and Trevor Dahl – producer
- Danny Casio – engineer
- Randy Merrill – mastering engineer
- Serban Ghenea, John Hanes – mix engineer

== Charts ==
=== Weekly charts ===
Chart (2018)	Peak position
Australia (ARIA)	92
Australia Dance (ARIA)	15
Belgium (Ultratip Bubbling Under Flanders)	35
Belgium (Ultratip Bubbling Under Wallonia)	23
Croatia International Airplay (HRT)	73
Czech Republic Singles Digital (ČNS IFPI)	84
Euro Digital Songs (Billboard)	12
France (SNEP)	127
Hungary (Rádiós Top 40)	35
Hungary (Single Top 40)	7
Ireland (IRMA)	13
Mexico Airplay (Billboard)	21
Netherlands (Dutch Top 40 Tipparade)	8
New Zealand Heatseekers (RMNZ)	5
Portugal (AFP)	81
Scotland Singles (OCC)	3
Slovakia Airplay (ČNS IFPI)	72
Slovakia Singles Digital (ČNS IFPI)	58
Sweden (Sverigetopplistan)	89
UK Singles (OCC)	13
US Hot Dance/Electronic Songs (Billboard)	15
US Pop Airplay (Billboard)	38

=== Year-end charts ===
Chart (2018)	Position
Iceland (Plötutíóindi)	96
US Hot Dance/Electronic Songs (Billboard)	45

== Certifications ==
Region	Certification	Certified units/sales
Brazil (Pro-Música Brasil)	Platinum	40,000^{‡}
Mexico (AMPROFON)	Gold	30,000^{‡}
New Zealand (RMNZ)	Gold	15,000^{‡}
Poland (ZPAV)	Gold	10,000^{‡}
United Kingdom (BPI)	Platinum	615,000
^{‡} Sales+streaming figures based on certification alone.

== Release history ==
Region	Date	Format	Label	Ref.
New Zealand	June 22, 2018	Digital download; streaming	Syco	
United States	July 31, 2018	Contemporary hit radio	300 Entertainment	
