= Think About Us =

2019 single by Little Mix

Single by Little Mix featuring Ty Dolla Sign

from the album LM5
- Released: 25 January 2019
- Studio: Metropolis, London; Westpoint, London
- Genre: Pop
- Length: 3:54
- Label: Syco
- Songwriters: Camille Purcell; Linus Nordström; Frank Nobel; Tyrone Griffin, Jr. (add.); Victor Bolander (add.)
- Producers: Purcell; Goldfingers; Louis Bell

Little Mix singles chronology
| "Woman Like Me" (2018) | "Think About Us" (2019) | "Bounce Back" (2019) |

Ty Dolla Sign singles chronology
| "Nights Like This" (2019) | "Think About Us" (2019) | "Remember" (2019) |

Music video
- "Think About Us" on YouTube

"Think About Us" is a song by British girl group Little Mix. The original version appeared on their fifth studio album, LM5 (2018). A remixed version featuring American singer Ty Dolla Sign was released on 25 January 2019 as the second and final single from the album. The song was written by Kamille, Goldfingers, Frank Nobel, Ty Dolla Sign and Victor Bolander, and produced by Kamille, Goldfingers and Louis Bell.

"Think About Us" has been described as a pop song and a power ballad with elements of tropical house. It was met with positive reviews from critics who praised the song for its upbeat tempo and good vibes feeling. The song addresses feelings of insecurity within a relationship. The single peaked at number twenty-two on the UK Singles Chart and charted in seven other countries. It has since been certified platinum in Brazil and gold in Poland and the United Kingdom.

== Composition ==
"Think About Us" is a pop song and power ballad with elements of tropical house, Afrobeats and Latin pop. Built around a dance breakdown, the track "eschews common ballad structure in favour of more rhythmic verses".

The lyrics find the group questioning the seriousness of a relationship and whether their partner wants to be with them. Ty Dolla Sign responds in his verse near the end of the song by singing about how he is similarly affected by the relationship's insecurity. His verse is sung alongside Jesy Nelson and Jade Thirlwall.

== Critical reception ==
Mike Nied from Idolator deemed the song "stunning" and wrote, "Built around an infectious break, it is a lush floor filler." Megan Downing from MTV UK called it "the storming emotional pop banger we all need in our lives right now", while Michael Silver of Billboard magazine described it as "danceable". Writing for People magazine, Tomás Mier found the track similar to "Cheap Thrills" by Sia and complimented its "catchy beat". The National said "Think About Us" has "Beyoncé-like swagger" and after listening to it "you are left with a pleasantly guilty feeling." Attitude magazine's Joe Passmore wrote that while not as experimental as other tracks from LM5, its "slight Latin vibe is on trend and it sounds like an easily consumable radio single".

== Music video ==
=== Background and concept ===
The all-white rave scene's staging is based on Jeremy Bentham's panopticon as a commentary alluding to Little Mix's fame.

Directed by Bradley & Pablo, the music video for "Think About Us" was filmed in London on 12 December 2018. Intended as a more honest and authentic representation of Little Mix, Bradley & Pablo used a mature and stripped back execution based on the sound of LM5. They eschewed polished visuals in favour of "effortlessly sexy" styling and candid scenes inspired by 1990s Calvin Klein campaigns, and opted for the group not to perform choreography to show a side to them that is "less like a tightly controlled performance and more like them". Leigh-Anne Pinnock invited her fiancé, English footballer Andre Gray, to appear in the video.

The concept has a double meaning and was a collaborative process, according to Bradley & Pablo. It has a theme of paranoia, control and surveillance, based on "emotions and sensations that you experience in a relationship that may be lost in a future where certain kinds of intimacy are no longer possible". The concept alludes to Little Mix's fame by using contained sets within an industrial space and staging inspired by Jeremy Bentham's panopticon.

=== Synopsis ===
Each member of Little Mix has their own set-up in the music video inspired by different stages of a relationship. Candid scenes from each set-up are intercut throughout. It opens with Perrie Edwards lying in a meadow filled with butterflies, based on the start of a relationship and the feeling of butterflies in the stomach. Representing the icy end to a relationship, Thirlwall is shown fighting a snowstorm in a white lace bralet, white padded jacket and tartan, long plaid maxi skirt.

In her passion scene, Nelson wears a red halterneck and high-waisted denim jeans, and straddles a topless man. In her scene representing dangers in a relationship, Pinnock in a leather two-piece, wraps her legs around Gray sitting on a motorcycle for their segment. The group then come together in all-white and body-to-body rave scenes with Ty Dolla Sign.

== Live performances ==
Little Mix gave their first live performance of "Think About Us" on The Graham Norton Show on 14 December 2018. On 12 January 2019, the group performed the song on The Brits Are Coming. They also performed the track along with "Woman Like Me" on The Voice of Holland on 1 February 2019, and at the 2019 Global Awards on 7 March 2019. They performed the song at various music festivals such as BBC Radio 1's Big Weekend on 26 May 2019, the Fusion Festival on 1 September 2019, and the GRLS Festival on 8 March 2020. The song was also regularly performed on LM5: The Tour.

== Personnel ==
- Jesy Nelson – vocals
- Leigh-Anne Pinnock – vocals
- Jade Thirlwall – vocals
- Perrie Edwards – vocals
- Kamille – production, vocal production and recording, piano, keyboards, drum programming, backing vocals
- Goldfingers – production, vocal production, piano, keyboards, drum programming
- Louis Bell – production
- Frank Nobel – piano, keys, drum programming, backing vocals
- Liam Nolan – vocal engineering
- Jason Elliot – vocal engineering
- Joe Kearns – additional vocal production and recording
- Phil Tan – mixing
- Bill Zimmerman – engineering assistance
- Randy Merrill – mastering
- James Royo – mixing, vocal engineering

Credits adapted from Qobuz.

== Charts ==
| Chart (2019) | Peak position |
|---|---|
| Belgium (Ultratip Bubbling Under Flanders) | 14 |
| Belgium (Ultratip Bubbling Under Wallonia) | 32 |
| Croatia (HRT) | 81 |
| Czech Republic Singles Digital (ČNS IFPI) | 61 |
| Euro Digital Songs (Billboard) | 16 |
| Ireland (IRMA) | 36 |
| Netherlands (Dutch Top 40 Tipparade) | 14 |
| New Zealand Hot Singles (RMNZ) | 26 |
| Romania (Airplay 100) | 58 |
| Scotland Singles (OCC) | 9 |
| UK Singles (OCC) | 22 |

== Certifications ==
| Region | Certification | Certified units/sales |
|---|---|---|
| Brazil (Pro-Música Brasil) | Platinum | 40,000^{‡} |
| Poland (ZPAV) | Gold | 25,000^{‡} |
| United Kingdom (BPI) | Gold | 400,000^{‡} |
^{‡} Sales+streaming figures based on certification alone.

== Release history ==
List of region, release date, format, label and reference
| Region | Date | Format | Label | Ref. |
|---|---|---|---|---|
| Various | 25 January 2019 | Digital download; streaming | Syco | |
| Italy | 22 February 2019 | Contemporary hit radio | Sony | |
