= Woman Like Me =

Single by Little Mix featuring Nicki Minaj

from the album LM5
- Released: 12 October 2018
- Genre: Pop; reggaeton; reggae fusion
- Length: 3:48
- Label: Syco
- Songwriters: Jess Glynne; Steve McCutcheon; Ed Sheeran; Onika Maraj
- Producer: McCutcheon

Little Mix singles chronology
"Only You" (2018)	"Woman Like Me" (2018)	"Think About Us" (2019)

Nicki Minaj singles chronology
"Idol" (2018)	"Woman Like Me" (2018)	"Dip" (2018)

Music video
- "Woman Like Me" on YouTube

"Woman Like Me" is a song by British girl group Little Mix featuring Trinidadian rapper and singer Nicki Minaj. It was released on 12 October 2018, by Syco Music, as the lead single from the group's fifth studio album LM5. The song was co-written by Jess Glynne, Ed Sheeran, Minaj and the song's producer Steve Mac.

"Woman Like Me" has been described by critics as a pop and reggae fusion song with elements of dance pop and reggaeton. It received positive reviews from music critics and has been described as a girl power song. The song addresses themes of femininity, equality, and girl power. A music video was released on 22 October 2018 and see the group challenging female stereotypes. At the 39th Brit Awards, the song won the award for British Video of the Year, and it also won Best Song at the 2019 Global Awards.

The song reached number one on the Official Big Top 40 Vodafone Charts and the Media Forest TV Airplay chart. It reached number two on the UK Singles Chart, making Little Mix the first act from The X Factor to achieve 20 UK Top 40 singles. It also peaked inside the top ten in five other countries, and reached the top twenty in several additional countries including Spain, Singapore, and Lithuania. In 2023, it was certified double platinum in the UK by the BPI. It has also received one diamond, two platinum, and five gold music certifications worldwide. Little Mix promoted the song with live performances on several TV programmes and award ceremonies, including The X Factor and Strictly Come Dancing in the UK, and at the 2018 MTV Europe Music Awards with Minaj.

== Composition and release ==
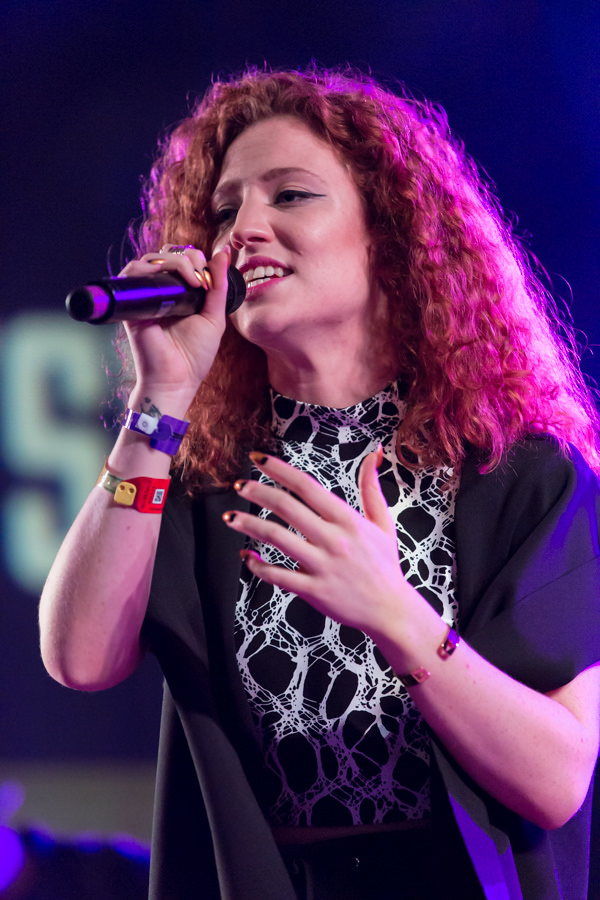
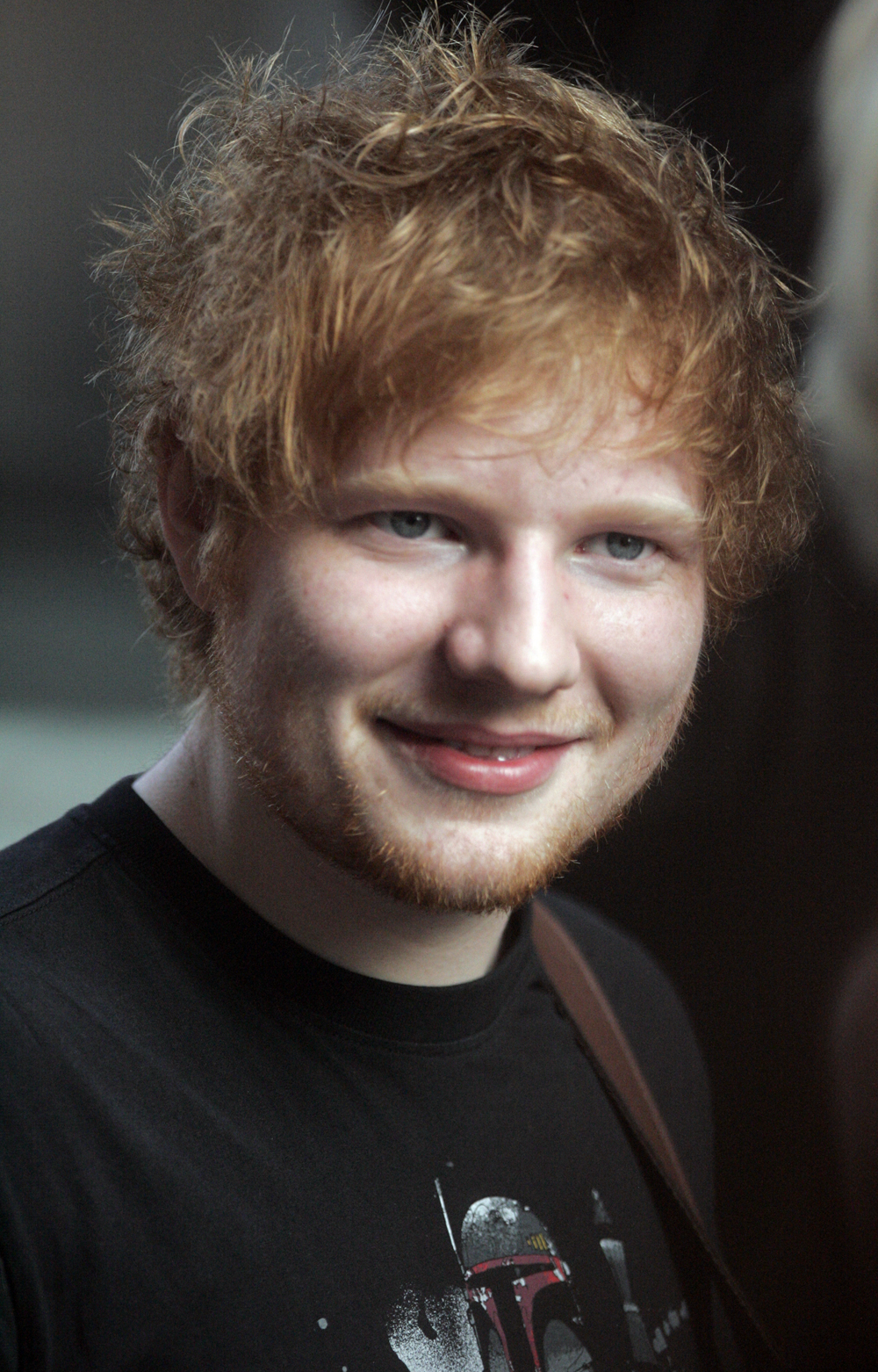
Jess Glynne (left) and Ed Sheeran (right) contributed to the songwriting.

"Woman Like Me" is a pop, reggae fusion, and reggaeton song, with an urban groove. Sam Damshenas from XXL called the song a "reggae-infused pop song" and calling Minaj's verse similar to her feature on Ariana Grande's single "Side to Side". According to sheet music published by Sony/ATV Music Publishing on Musicnotes.com, "Woman Like Me" is composed in the key of F minor and set in common time at a moderate tempo of 150 beats per minute. Little Mix's voices range from E♭_{3} to a high E♭_{5}.

The song was written by Jess Glynne, Ed Sheeran and producer Steve Mac. Glynne stated she had intended the song for her second album Always in Between, but that it "didn't fit where the album was going". Glynne's version of "Woman Like Me" surfaced on the internet in late October 2018. The song was given to Little Mix, with Glynne and Little Mix making slight changes to the lyrics to suit the group. Sheeran and the group then "went into the studio and tweaked little bits" to make it "more personal to us". Little Mix stated on their social media that the song is "about celebrating women in every shape and form". Glynne revealed that Sheeran's uncredited backing vocals can be heard during the song's chorus.

In October 2018, rapper Cardi B claimed during an Instagram post that she had been sent the track beforehand as a request to collaborate and did not accept because she was already working on other songs, so it was then offered to Minaj, after the latter said that she was interfering with her collaborators. However, Little Mix later said that the record label sent the song to both rappers, but they had always wanted to collaborate with Minaj, and posted various interviews where they stated that Minaj was their first choice for a collaborator on a song.

"Woman Like Me" was released on Spotify at midnight on 12 October 2018. In 2020, a remix of "Woman Like Me" featuring Banx & Ranx was included on the soundtrack of the film The Broken Hearts Gallery.

== Artwork ==
The artwork for the song was released along with the video, and has been noted for featuring the group looking distinctly more "natural" than their usual look. The group also all wear black polo necks.

== Music video ==
The music videos opens with the quartet attending finishing school where training reinforces stereotypes of how women should supposedly properly conduct themselves. The scene where the girls are dressed in leotard is a reference to outfits they've been criticised for wearing in the past, being seen as too provocative. In another scene Little Mix are seen walking down a massive ruler, referencing that you canot measure or weigh a woman's worth.

The video shows the band members standing next to each other in front of Knebworth House, Hertfordshire.

The massive scales represent equality. Men are not called out for their clothing or behaviour or anything in the same way that women are. The scales allude to the fact that equality between the sexes does not exist yet and Little Mix want to balance the scales. Filming for the music video took place around late September 2018. It was filmed at the Knebworth House, Hertfordshire and was directed by Marc Klasfeld. The video was released on 25 October 2018 on Vevo.

The music video for Woman Like Me was met with praise from critics. It sees the group breaking gender norms, while promoting equality and strength. It sees the members challenging stereotypes with scenes in reference to housewife stereotypes, lack of equality displayed between men and women, and the criticism they have faced for their clothing choices throughout their career. Rolling Stone wrote "Little Mix and Minaj challenge stereotypes in the ‘Woman Like Me’ Video. The visual finds the quartet attending finishing school where the training reinforces stereotypes of how women should supposedly properly conduct themselves."

MTV wrote that the video was their best one to date, mentioning how the group are no strangers to bold, and empowering music videos referring to earlier music videos including "Power", and "Shout Out to My Ex". They also stated "They turn into their most prim and proper selves while doing stereotypical "wifey" tasks: ironing a shirt, vacuuming, and pouring tea. But as the song goes on and the girls assert themselves as confident, uunconventional women, they ditch the poshness and let loose, generally giving zero fucks."

At the 39th Brit Awards, the song's video won British Video of the Year, making Little Mix the last act to win the award before it was defunct following the Brit Awards ceremony in 2019. Pinnock also said in an interview, "it's personally one of my favourite videos that we've shot. The thing I love about it is that most of the video is us all as a group. We've hardly got any solos. We've never done that before."

== Live performances ==
Little Mix performed "Woman Like Me" live for the first time at BBC Radio 1's Teen Awards along with three other singles "Shout Out to My Ex", "Touch" and "Only You" on 21 October 2018. They also performed the song on The X Factor one week later. The first performance to feature Minaj occurred at the 2018 MTV Europe Music Awards on 4 November in Bilbao, Spain. On 17 November, they performed the song in the first episode of the fourth season of Michael McIntyre's Big Show. Little Mix also performed the song on Strictly Come Dancing on 9 December, featuring four of the contest's female dancers in the choreography. They performed the song at the Jingle Bell Ball on the same day. On 1 February 2019, they performed "Woman Like Me" on The Voice of Holland with two of the show's contestants, Debrah Jade and Kimberly. Little Mix performed the song at the 2019 Brit Awards on 20 February 2019 alongside rapper Ms Banks. The group also performed the single at the 2019 Global Awards, along with "Think About Us" on 7 March 2019.

They went on to perform the song on different music festivals like the BBC Radio 1's Big Weekend on 26 May, the Fusion Festival on 1 September, and the GRLS Festival on 8 March 2020. "Woman Like Me" was included on the set list on two of Little Mix's concert tours — LM5: The Tour, and the Confetti Tour, where the group performed the rock rendition of the song, and sang the chorus of "Free Your Mind" by En Vogue as the bridge. They also performed the song for their virtual concert, called Uncancelled, that took place on 21 August 2020.

== Critical reception ==
Chloe Gilke from Uproxx called the song a "reggae-influenced dance-pop banger" with "tight harmonies". Brooke Bajgrowicz from Billboard said: "the female-empowering lead single asks whether a man could fall in love with a woman who isn't the stereotypical "good girl", suggesting that being your own person is more important", she also mention "Minaj adds a touch of sass to the third verse".

Gemma from the Evening Standard called described the song as reggae-pop. Althea of Rolling Stone said "Perrie Edwards, Jesy Nelson, Leigh-Anne Pinnock and Jade Thirlwall each trade verses on the reggae-pop-tinged track with lyrics that celebrate their individuality." Sam from Gay Times said "Woman Like Me is an empowering reggae-fusion anthem." Madeline from MTV called it "a reggae-tinged jam" which "puts Little Mix back in familiar, boss-minded, pop-powered terrain, as they wonder whether a guy could fall for a strong, 'unconventional' woman."

The song was included on the 2020 edition of Just Dance. In the same year a Banx and Ranx Remix of the song was released and featured in The Broken Hearts Gallery. Writing for Rolling Stone Italia in 2022, Little Mix's performance with Minaj at the 2018 MTV Europe Music Awards, was ranked as one of the shows most iconic performance. They wrote "Their stage presence doesn't seem to need dancers around. Two worlds meet that evening, giving life to one of the most memorables performances."

Woman Like Me on year-end lists
Critic/Publication	List	Rank	Ref.
Official Charts	Biggest streamed video of 2018		
Billboard	Best performance of 2018	1	

== Accolades ==
Year	Organization	Award	Result	Ref.
2019	2019 Brit Awards	British Video of the Year	Won	
2019	2019 Global Awards	Best Song	Won	

== Commercial performance ==
"Woman Like Me" peaked at number one in Israel and topped the Official Big Top 40. On the UK Singles Chart, the song peaked at number two, becoming the group's eighth Top 5 single. It also made them the first act from The X Factor UK to score 20 UK Top 40 singles. By the end of 2018, it was named by the Official Charts, as one of the streamed video tracks of that year. In 2021, it became Little Mix's seventh song to surpass one million sales in the country. As of 2022, it ranks as the group's seventh biggest single in the country.

Woman Like Me reached the top ten of the Euro and Finland Singles Charts, while entering the top ten of the charts in Romania, Scotland, Belgium, Greece, Ireland, and Lebanon. The single reached the charts in twenty-two other music markets including the top twenty in Singapore, Hungary, Spain, Lithuania, and Mexico. It has since been certified platinum in the UK, Australia, Poland, certified diamond in Brazil, and certified gold in five other territories.

== Track listing ==
Digital download and streaming – featuring Nicki Minaj

1. "Woman Like Me" (featuring Nicki Minaj) – 3:48

Digital download and streaming – Wideboys remix

1. "Woman Like Me" (Wideboys remix) – 2:53

Digital download and streaming – Banx & Ranx remix

1. "Woman Like Me" (Banx & Ranx remix) – 3:05

Digital download and streaming – featuring Ms Banks

1. "Woman Like Me" (featuring Ms Banks) – 3:22
2. "Woman Like Me" (featuring Ms Banks, Da Beatfreakz remix) – 3:09

== Credits and personnel ==
Credits adapted from Tidal.

- Jesy Nelson – vocals
- Leigh-Anne Pinnock – vocals
- Jade Thirlwall – vocals
- Perrie Edwards – vocals
- Nicki Minaj – featured artist
- Jess Glynne – songwriting
- Ed Sheeran – songwriting, bass, guitar
- Steve Mac – production, songwriting, keyboards, piano
- Chris Laws – drums, engineering, programming
- Dann Pursey – engineering
- John Parricelli – guitar
- Phil Tan – mixing
- Randy Merrill – mastering
- Bill Zimmerman – engineering

== Charts ==
=== Weekly charts ===
Chart (2018)	Peak position
Australia (ARIA)	23
Austria (Ö3 Austria Top 40)	33
Belgium (Ultratop 50 Flanders)	23
Belgium (Ultratip Bubbling Under Wallonia)	2
Canada Hot 100 (Billboard)	60
Croatia International Airplay (HRT)	19
Czech Republic Singles Digital (ČNS IFPI)	29
Euro Digital Songs (Billboard)	3
Finland Digital Song Sales (Billboard)	2
Germany (GfK)	53
Greece (IFPI)	7
Hungary (Single Top 40)	23
Hungary (Stream Top 40)	16
Ireland (IRMA)	3
Israel (Media Forest TV Airplay)	1
Italy (FIMI)	79
Japan (Japan Hot 100)	87
Lebanon (Lebanese Top 20)	6
Lithuania (AGATA)	15
Mexico (Billboard Ingles Airplay)	18
Netherlands (Dutch Top 40)	27
Netherlands (Single Top 100)	27
New Zealand (Recorded Music NZ)	23
Norway (VG-lista)	32
Portugal (AFP)	28
Romania (Airplay 100)	11
Romania Airplay (Media Forest)	5
Scottish Singles Sales (Official Charts)	2
Singapore (RIAS)	13
Slovakia Singles Digital (ČNS IFPI)	19
Spain Physical/Digital Songs (PROMUSICAE)	12
Sweden (Sverigetopplistan)	65
Switzerland (Schweizer Hitparade)	31
UK Singles (Official Charts)	2
US Bubbling Under Hot 100 (Billboard)	4
Venezuela Anglo (Record Report)	43

=== Year-end charts ===
Chart (2018)	Position
Belgium Urban (Ultratop Flanders)	47
Romania (Airplay 100)	53
Chart (2019)	Position
UK Singles (Official Charts Company)	98

== Certifications ==
Certifications for "Woman Like Me"
Region	Certification	Certified units/sales
Australia (ARIA)	Platinum	70,000^{‡}
Brazil (Pro-Música Brasil)	Diamond	160,000^{‡}
Canada (Music Canada)	Gold	40,000^{‡}
Denmark (IFPI Danmark)	Gold	45,000^{‡}
Mexico (AMPROFON)	Gold	30,000^{‡}
Norway (IFPI Norway)	Gold	30,000^{‡}
Poland (ZPAV)	Platinum	20,000^{‡}
Switzerland (IFPI Switzerland)	Gold	10,000^{‡}
United Kingdom (BPI)	2× Platinum	1,200,000^{‡}
^{‡} Sales+streaming figures based on certification alone.

== Release history ==
List of release dates and formats for "Woman Like Me"
Region	Date	Format(s)	Version(s)	Label	Ref.
Various	12 October 2018	Digital download; streaming	Nicki Minaj version	Syco	
Italy	26 October 2018	Contemporary hit radio	Nicki Minaj version	Sony	
Various	5 November 2018	Digital download; streaming	Wideboys remix	Syco	
Various	14 December 2018	Digital download; streaming	Banx & Ranx remix	Syco	
Various	22 February 2019	Digital download; streaming	Ms Banks version	Syco	
