= Brit Award for British Video of the Year =

British music award

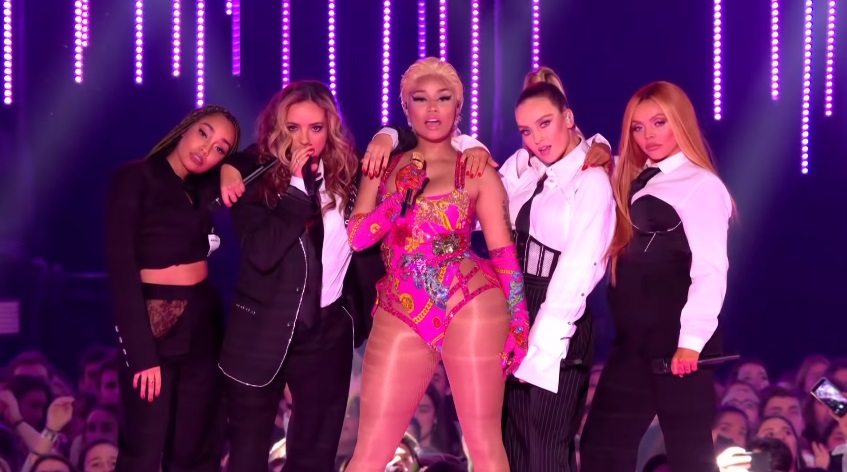
- 2019 Winners Little Mix and Nicki Minaj
- Awarded for: Achievement in excellent British video
- Country: United Kingdom (UK)
- Presented by: British Phonographic Industry (BPI)
- First award: 1985
- Final award: 2019
- Currently held by: Little Mix featuring Nicki Minaj – "Woman Like Me" (2019)

Highlights
- Most awards: One Direction (4)
- Most nominations: Calvin Harris; Robbie Williams (6 each)
- Website: brits.co.uk

The Brit Award for British Video of the Year was an award given by the British Phonographic Industry (BPI), an organisation which represents record companies and artists in the United Kingdom. The accolade is presented at the Brit Awards, an annual celebration of British and international music. The nominees are determined by the Brit Awards voting academy with over one-thousand members, which comprise record labels, publishers, managers, agents, media, and previous winners and nominees.

== History ==
The award was first presented in 1985 as British Video of the Year. From 2003 to 2013, the award was not given out. It was then revived in 2014, becoming a fan-voted award which allowed users of Twitter to vote for nominees through personalised hashtags. The vote involved weekly fan votes through Twitter, including the final vote which took place on the night of the ceremony. The award was defunct following the 2019 Brit Awards and was last awarded to Little Mix.

Two non-British artists won the award; American singer Michael Jackson as the sole artist on "Smooth Criminal" in 1989 and Trinidadian rapper Nicki Minaj as a featured artist on "Woman Like Me" by Little Mix in 2019. 11 of the 22 videos nominated in 1990 were by international artists; "Batdance" by American musician Prince, "The Best" by American singer Tina Turner, "Eye Know" by American group De La Soul, "Free at Last" by American DJ Farley Keith, "Lambada" by French-Brazilian group Kaoma, "Loco in Acapulco" by American group the Four Tops, "Manchild" by Swedish singer Neneh Cherry, "Miss You Much" by American singer Janet Jackson, "Nou Pas Bouger" by Malian singer Salif Keita, "Paradise City" by American band Guns N' Roses and "We Didn't Start the Fire" by American musician Billy Joel.

Besides Minaj, 20 other non-British artists were nominated as co-lead or featured artists in later years; American rapper Missy Elliott for "I Want You Back" with Mel B in 1999; American rapper Del the Funky Homosapien for "Clint Eastwood" with Gorillaz, Australian singer Kylie Minogue for "Kids" with Robbie Williams and American musician Bootsy Collins for "Weapon of Choice" with Fatboy Slim in 2002; American singer Bruno Mars for "Uptown Funk" with Mark Ronson in 2015; American singer Beyoncé for "Runnin' (Lose It All)" with Naughty Boy and Arrow Benjamin in 2016; Jamaican singer Sean Paul for "Hair" with Little Mix and "Rockabye" with Clean Bandit and Anne-Marie and Barbadian singer Rihanna for "This Is What You Came For" with Calvin Harris in 2017; Swedish singer Zara Larsson for "Girls Like" with Tinie Tempah in 2017 and "Symphony" with Clean Bandit in 2018; American singer Taylor Swift for "I Don't Wanna Live Forever" with Zayn, American rapper Quavo for "Strip That Down" with Liam Payne, American artists Pharrell Williams, Katy Perry and Big Sean for "Feels" with Harris and New Zealand singer William Singe for "Mama" with Jonas Blue in 2018; and Norwegian singer Ina Wroldsen for "Breathe" with Jax Jones, American duo Jack & Jack for "Rise" with Blue, American singer Demi Lovato for "Solo" with Clean Bandit and American rapper Macklemore for "These Days" with Rudimental, Jess Glynne and Dan Caplen in 2019.

Seven artists were nominated for two videos in the same year; Wham! for "Last Christmas" and "Wake Me Up Before You Go-Go" in 1985, the Prodigy for "Breathe" and "Firestarter" in 1997, Williams for "Kids" and "Supreme" in 2002, Ellie Goulding as a lead artist on "Burn" and a featured artist on "I Need Your Love" in 2014, Paul as a featured artist on "Hair" and "Rockabye" in 2017, and Rita Ora as a co-lead artist on "For You" and the sole artist on "Let You Love Me" and Dua Lipa as the sole artist on "IDGAF" and a co-lead artist on "One Kiss" in 2019. "Killer" is the only song for which two different videos were nominated; the original video by Adamski featuring Seal was nominated in 1991, and the video for Seal's solo version won the following year.

== Winners and nominees ==
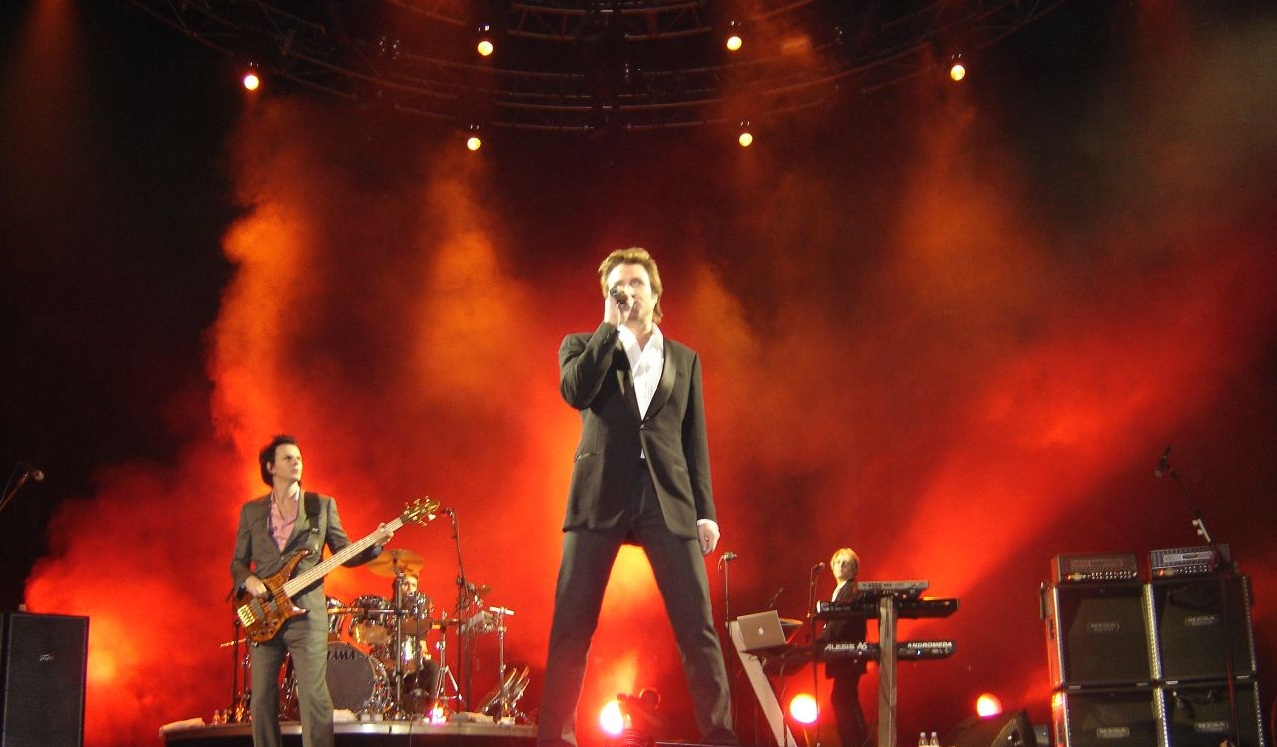
Inaugural winner Duran Duran

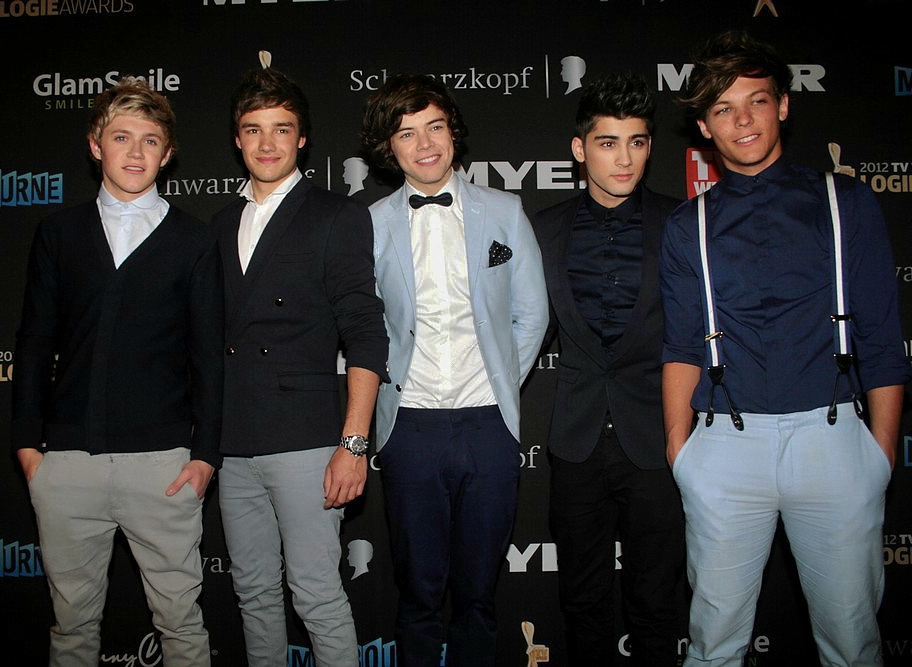
One Direction is the first four-time winner.

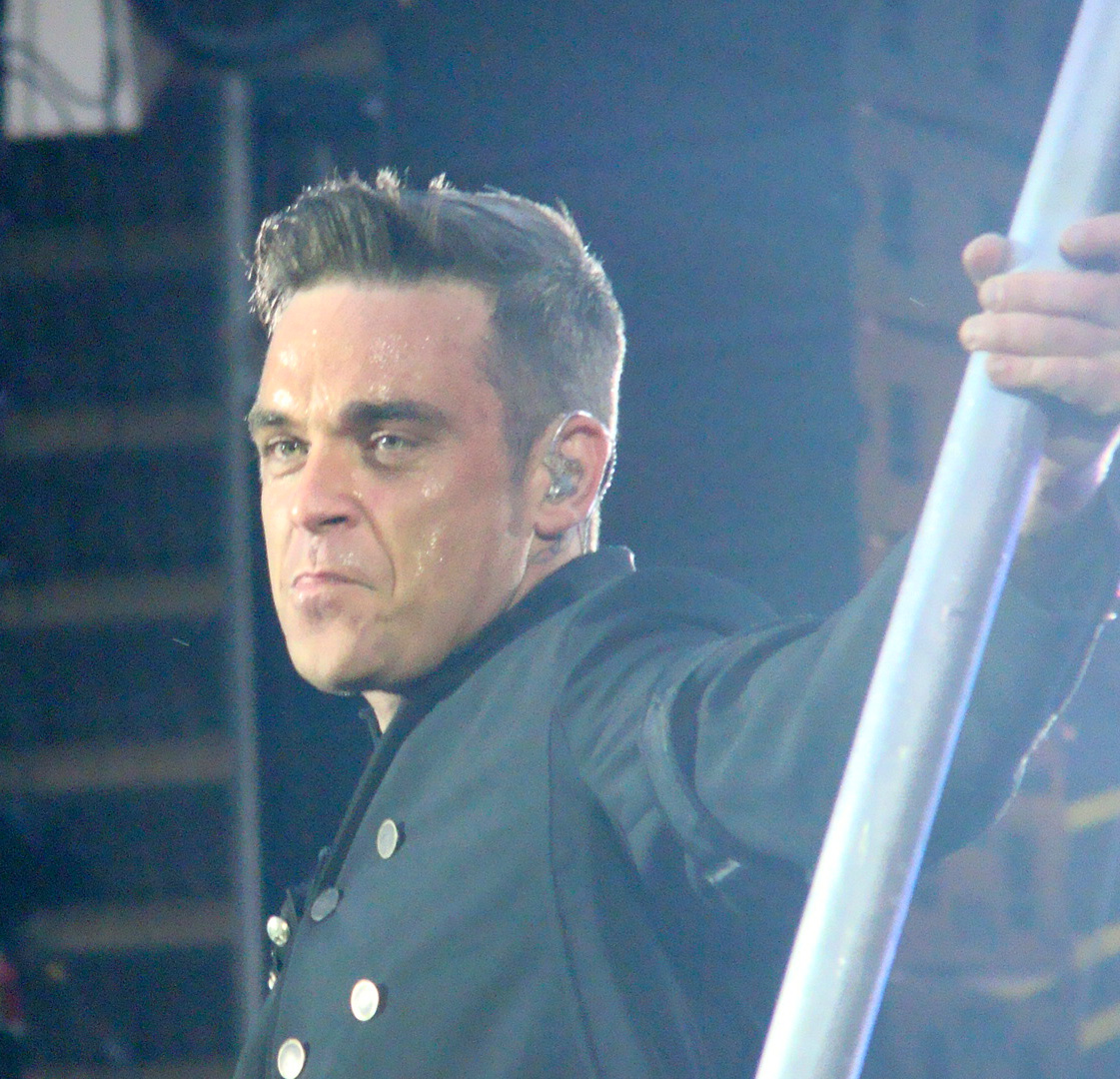
Robbie Williams was the first two-time and three-time winner.

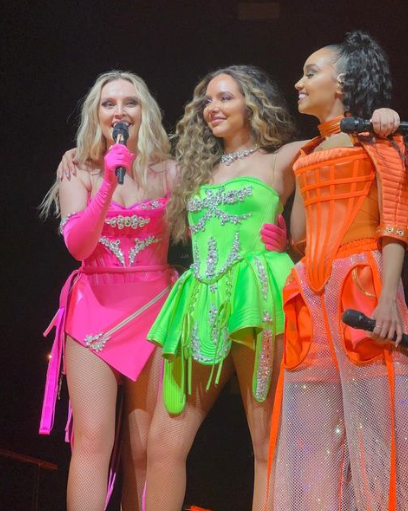
Little Mix and Nicki Minaj are the last act to receive this award.

=== 1980s ===
Year	Video	Artist(s)
1985 (5th)
1985 (5th)	"The Wild Boys"	Duran Duran
1985 (5th)	"Last Christmas"	Wham!
1985 (5th)	"Wake Me Up Before You Go-Go"	Wham!
1986 (6th)
1986 (6th)	"Everytime You Go Away"	Paul Young
1986 (6th)	"Dancing in the Street"	David Bowie & Mick Jagger
1986 (6th)	"Money for Nothing"	Dire Straits
1987 (7th)
1987 (7th)	"Sledgehammer"	Peter Gabriel
1988 (8th)
1988 (8th)	"True Faith"	New Order
1989 (9th)
1989 (9th)	"Smooth Criminal"	Michael Jackson
1989 (9th)	"Harvest for the World"	The Christians
1989 (9th)	"Nathan Jones"	Bananarama
1989 (9th)	"Temptation"	Wet Wet Wet
1989 (9th)	"When We Was Fab"	George Harrison

=== 1990s ===
Year	Video	Artist(s)
1990 (10th)
1990 (10th)	"Lullaby"	The Cure
1990 (10th)	"All Around the World"	Lisa Stansfield
1990 (10th)	"Batdance"	Prince
1990 (10th)	"The Best"	Tina Turner
1990 (10th)	"Don't Ask Me Why"	Eurythmics
1990 (10th)	"Eye Know"	De La Soul
1990 (10th)	"Free at Last"	Farley Keith
1990 (10th)	"If You Don't Know Me by Now"	Simply Red
1990 (10th)	"The Invisible Man"	Queen
1990 (10th)	"Lambada"	Kaoma
1990 (10th)	"Loco in Acapulco"	Four Tops
1990 (10th)	"Love Train"	Holly Johnson
1990 (10th)	"Manchild"	Neneh Cherry
1990 (10th)	"Miss You Much"	Janet Jackson
1990 (10th)	"My Brave Face"	Paul McCartney
1990 (10th)	"A New South Wales"	The Alarm
1990 (10th)	"Nou Pas Bouger"	Salif Keita
1990 (10th)	"Paradise City"	Guns N' Roses
1990 (10th)	"Pop Muzik"	M
1990 (10th)	"Song for Whoever"	The Beautiful South
1990 (10th)	"Sowing the Seeds of Love"	Tears for Fears
1990 (10th)	"We Didn't Start the Fire"	Billy Joel
1991 (11th)
1991 (11th)	"A Little Time"	The Beautiful South
1991 (11th)	"Close to Me"	The Cure
1991 (11th)	"Cradle of Love"	Billy Idol
1991 (11th)	"Crazy"	Seal
1991 (11th)	"Enjoy the Silence"	Depeche Mode
1991 (11th)	"Freedom! '90"	George Michael
1991 (11th)	"Hello"	The Beloved
1991 (11th)	"Killer"	Adamski featuring Seal
1991 (11th)	"King of Wishful Thinking"	Go West
1991 (11th)	"Where Are You Baby?"	Betty Boo
1992 (12th)
1992 (12th)	"Killer"	Seal
1992 (12th)	"Change"	Lisa Stansfield
1992 (12th)	"Cold, Cold Heart"	Midge Ure
1992 (12th)	"Funny How"	Airhead
1992 (12th)	"Goodbye Cruel World"	Shakespears Sister
1992 (12th)	"Last Train to Trancentral"	The KLF
1992 (12th)	"Love to Hate You"	Erasure
1992 (12th)	"Sexuality"	Billy Bragg
1992 (12th)	"The Size of a Cow"	The Wonder Stuff
1992 (12th)	"Stars"	Simply Red
1993 (13th)
1993 (13th)	"Stay"	Shakespears Sister
1993 (13th)	"For Your Babies"	Simply Red
1993 (13th)	"Jesus He Knows Me"	Genesis
1993 (13th)	"Take a Chance on Me"	Erasure
1993 (13th)	"Walking on Broken Glass"	Annie Lennox
1993 (13th)	Eliminated	
1993 (13th)	"All Woman"	Lisa Stansfield
1993 (13th)	"Digging in the Dirt"	Peter Gabriel
1993 (13th)	"Friday I'm in Love"	The Cure
1993 (13th)	"Sleeping Satellite"	Tasmin Archer
1993 (13th)	"Too Funky"	George Michael
1994 (14th)
1994 (14th)	"Pray"	Take That
1994 (14th)	"Fields of Gold"	Sting
1994 (14th)	"Go West"	Pet Shop Boys
1994 (14th)	"I Feel You"	Depeche Mode
1994 (14th)	"Jump They Say"	David Bowie
1994 (14th)	Eliminated	
1994 (14th)	"Animal Nitrate"	Suede
1994 (14th)	"Dreams"	Gabrielle
1994 (14th)	"Regret"	New Order
1994 (14th)	"Steam"	Peter Gabriel
1994 (14th)	"Too Young to Die"	Jamiroquai
1995 (15th)
1995 (15th)	"Parklife"	Blur featuring Phil Daniels
1995 (15th)	"Love Is Strong"	The Rolling Stones
1995 (15th)	"Prayer for the Dying"	Seal
1995 (15th)	"Space Cowboy"	Jamiroquai
1995 (15th)	"The Wild Ones"	Suede
1996 (16th)
1996 (16th)	"Wonderwall"	Oasis
1996 (16th)	"Back for Good"	Take That
1996 (16th)	"Common People"	Pulp
1996 (16th)	"Country House"	Blur
1996 (16th)	"Just"	Radiohead
1996 (16th)	Eliminated	
1996 (16th)	"Alright"	Supergrass
1996 (16th)	"Fairground"	Simply Red
1996 (16th)	"Like a Rolling Stone"	The Rolling Stones
1996 (16th)	"Protection"	Massive Attack
1996 (16th)	"The Universal"	Blur
1997 (17th)
1997 (17th)	"Say You'll Be There"	Spice Girls
1997 (17th)	"The Box"	Orbital
1997 (17th)	"Breathe"	The Prodigy
1997 (17th)	"A Design for Life"	Manic Street Preachers
1997 (17th)	"Fastlove"	George Michael
1997 (17th)	"Firestarter"	The Prodigy
1997 (17th)	"Good Enough"	Dodgy
1997 (17th)	"Setting Sun"	The Chemical Brothers featuring Noel Gallagher
1997 (17th)	"Virtual Insanity"	Jamiroquai
1997 (17th)	"Wannabe"	Spice Girls
1998 (18th)
1998 (18th)	"Never Ever"	All Saints
1998 (18th)	"Alright"	Jamiroquai
1998 (18th)	"Bitter Sweet Symphony"	The Verve
1998 (18th)	"Block Rockin' Beats"	The Chemical Brothers
1998 (18th)	"D'You Know What I Mean?"	Oasis
1998 (18th)	"Drop Dead Gorgeous"	Republica
1998 (18th)	"Late in the Day"	Supergrass
1998 (18th)	"Little Wonder"	David Bowie
1998 (18th)	"Song 2"	Blur
1998 (18th)	"Spice Up Your Life"	Spice Girls
1998 (18th)	"Sunchyme"	Dario G
1999 (19th)
1999 (19th)	"Millennium"	Robbie Williams
1999 (19th)	"Brimful of Asha"	Cornershop
1999 (19th)	"Deeper Underground"	Jamiroquai
1999 (19th)	"I Want You Back"	Mel B featuring Missy Elliott
1999 (19th)	"Let Me Entertain You"	Robbie Williams
1999 (19th)	"No Surprises"	Radiohead
1999 (19th)	"Outside"	George Michael
1999 (19th)	"Pure Morning"	Placebo
1999 (19th)	"Teardrop"	Massive Attack
1999 (19th)	"Under the Bridge"	All Saints

=== 2000s ===
Year	Video	Artist(s)
2000 (20th)
2000 (20th)	"She's the One"	Robbie Williams
2000 (20th)	"Let Forever Be"	The Chemical Brothers featuring Noel Gallagher
2000 (20th)	"Praise You"	Fatboy Slim
2000 (20th)	"Pumping on Your Stereo"	Supergrass
2000 (20th)	"Windowlicker"	Aphex Twin
2001 (21st)
2001 (21st)	"Rock DJ"	Robbie Williams
2001 (21st)	"7 Days"	Craig David
2001 (21st)	"Dancing in the Moonlight"	Toploader
2001 (21st)	"Pure Shores"	All Saints
2001 (21st)	"Yellow"	Coldplay
2001 (21st)	Eliminated	
2001 (21st)	"Coming Around"	Travis
2001 (21st)	"In Demand"	Texas
2001 (21st)	"It Feels So Good"	Sonique
2001 (21st)	"Money"	Jamelia
2001 (21st)	"The Time Is Now"	Moloko
2002 (22nd)
2002 (22nd)	"21 Seconds"	So Solid Crew
2002 (22nd)	"Clint Eastwood"	Gorillaz featuring Del the Funky Homosapien
2002 (22nd)	"I Want Love"	Elton John
2002 (22nd)	"Kids"	Robbie Williams & Kylie Minogue
2002 (22nd)	"Sing"	Travis
2002 (22nd)	"Supreme"	Robbie Williams
2002 (22nd)	"Thank You"	Dido
2002 (22nd)	"Trouble"	Coldplay
2002 (22nd)	"Weapon of Choice"	Fatboy Slim featuring Bootsy Collins
2002 (22nd)	"Where's Your Head At"	Basement Jaxx

=== 2010s ===
Year	Video	Artist(s)
2014 (34th)
2014 (34th)	"Best Song Ever"	One Direction
2014 (34th)	"Burn"	Ellie Goulding
2014 (34th)	"I Need Your Love"	Calvin Harris featuring Ellie Goulding
2014 (34th)	"La La La"	Naughty Boy featuring Sam Smith
2014 (34th)	"Love Me Again"	John Newman
2015 (35th)
2015 (35th)	"You & I"	One Direction
2015 (35th)	"Stay with Me"	Sam Smith
2015 (35th)	"Summer"	Calvin Harris
2015 (35th)	"Thinking Out Loud"	Ed Sheeran
2015 (35th)	"Uptown Funk"	Mark Ronson featuring Bruno Mars
2015 (35th)	Eliminated	
2015 (35th)	"Boom Clap"	Charli XCX
2015 (35th)	"I Got U"	Duke Dumont featuring Jax Jones
2015 (35th)	"I Will Never Let You Down"	Rita Ora
2015 (35th)	"My Love"	Route 94 featuring Jess Glynne
2015 (35th)	"Nobody to Love"	Sigma
2016 (36th)
2016 (36th)	"Drag Me Down"	One Direction
2016 (36th)	"Black Magic"	Little Mix
2016 (36th)	"Flashlight"	Jessie J
2016 (36th)	"Hello"	Adele
2016 (36th)	"Photograph"	Ed Sheeran
2016 (36th)	Eliminated	
2016 (36th)	"How Deep Is Your Love"	Calvin Harris & Disciples
2016 (36th)	"King"	Years & Years
2016 (36th)	"Love Me like You Do"	Ellie Goulding
2016 (36th)	"Runnin' (Lose It All)"	Naughty Boy featuring Beyoncé & Arrow Benjamin
2016 (36th)	"Writing's on the Wall"	Sam Smith
2017 (37th)
2017 (37th)	"History"	One Direction
2017 (37th)	"Hair"	Little Mix featuring Sean Paul
2017 (37th)	"Hymn for the Weekend"	Coldplay
2017 (37th)	"Pillowtalk"	Zayn
2017 (37th)	"Say You Won't Let Go"	James Arthur
2017 (37th)	Eliminated	
2017 (37th)	"Fast Car"	Jonas Blue featuring Dakota
2017 (37th)	"Girls Like"	Tinie Tempah featuring Zara Larsson
2017 (37th)	"Rockabye"	Clean Bandit featuring Sean Paul & Anne-Marie
2017 (37th)	"Send My Love (To Your New Lover)"	Adele
2017 (37th)	"This Is What You Came For"	Calvin Harris featuring Rihanna
2018 (38th)
2018 (38th)	"Sign of the Times"	Harry Styles
2018 (38th)	"I Don't Wanna Live Forever"	Zayn & Taylor Swift
2018 (38th)	"Shape of You"	Ed Sheeran
2018 (38th)	"Strip That Down"	Liam Payne featuring Quavo
2018 (38th)	"Touch"	Little Mix
2018 (38th)	Eliminated	
2018 (38th)	"Ciao Adios"	Anne-Marie
2018 (38th)	"Feels"	Calvin Harris featuring Pharrell Williams, Katy Perry & Big Sean
2018 (38th)	"Mama"	Jonas Blue featuring William Singe
2018 (38th)	"New Rules"	Dua Lipa
2018 (38th)	"Symphony"	Clean Bandit featuring Zara Larsson
2019 (39th)
2019 (39th)	"Woman Like Me"	Little Mix featuring Nicki Minaj
2019 (39th)	"2002"	Anne-Marie
2019 (39th)	"Breathe"	Jax Jones featuring Ina Wroldsen
2019 (39th)	"For You"	Liam Payne & Rita Ora
2019 (39th)	"IDGAF"	Dua Lipa
2019 (39th)	"Let You Love Me"	Rita Ora
2019 (39th)	"One Kiss"	Calvin Harris & Dua Lipa
2019 (39th)	"Rise"	Jonas Blue featuring Jack & Jack
2019 (39th)	"Solo"	Clean Bandit featuring Demi Lovato
2019 (39th)	"These Days"	Rudimental featuring Jess Glynne, Macklemore & Dan Caplen

== Artists with multiple wins ==
Artists that received multiple awards
Awards	Artist
4	One Direction
3	Robbie Williams

== Artists with multiple nominations ==
6 nominations

- Calvin Harris
- Robbie Williams

5 nominations

- Jamiroquai

4 nominations

- Blur
- Little Mix
- George Michael
- One Direction
- Seal
- Simply Red

3 nominations

- All Saints
- Anne-Marie
- Jonas Blue
- David Bowie
- The Chemical Brothers
- Clean Bandit
- Coldplay
- The Cure
- Peter Gabriel
- Ellie Goulding
- Dua Lipa
- Rita Ora
- Ed Sheeran
- Sam Smith
- Spice Girls
- Lisa Stansfield
- Supergrass

2 nominations

- Adele
- The Beautiful South
- Depeche Mode
- Erasure
- Fatboy Slim
- Noel Gallagher
- Jess Glynne
- Jax Jones
- Zara Larsson
- Massive Attack
- Naughty Boy
- Oasis
- Liam Payne
- The Prodigy
- Radiohead
- The Rolling Stone
- Shakespears Sister
- Suede
- Take That
- Travis
- Wham!
- Zayn

== Notes ==
- "Killer" (1991–1992) Double Nominated
- "Pray" (1994), "Parklife" (1995), "Never Ever" (1998), "She's the One" (2000), "Rock DJ" (2001) also won Brit Award for British Single
