= Brit Awards 2019 =

British music awards ceremony

- Date: 20 February 2019
- Venue: The O2 Arena
- Hosted by: Jack Whitehall; Clara Amfo (BRITs Are Coming Nominations Launch Show and live from the Red carpet); Alice Levine (live from the Red carpet)

Highlights
- Most awards: The 1975 and Calvin Harris (2)
- Most nominations: Anne-Marie, Dua Lipa and Jess Glynne (4)

Television/radio coverage
- Network: ITV; ITV2 (Red carpet); YouTube
- Runtime: 140 minutes
- Viewership: 4.1 million

Brit Awards 2019 was the 39th edition of the British Phonographic Industry's annual pop music show, the Brit Awards. It was held on 20 February 2019 at The O2 Arena in London, with Jack Whitehall as the host for the second year running. Architect David Adjaye designed the BRIT statuette. BBC Radio 1, Live Lounge and Top of the Pops host Clara Amfo hosted the BRITs Are Coming Nominations Launch Show on 12 January 2019. Clara Amfo and Alice Levine were live from the Red Carpet before the Main Show on ITV2.

Hugh Jackman opened the ceremony with a song from The Greatest Showman soundtrack, and Pink closed the ceremony.

== Performers ==
=== Pre-ceremony ===
Performer(s)	Song	UK Singles Chart reaction (week ending 24 January 2019)	UK Albums Chart reaction (week ending 24 January 2019)
Jess Glynne	"Thursday"	24 (–5)	Always In Between – 5 (+1); I Cry When I Laugh – 36 (+10)
George Ezra	"Hold My Girl"	12 (–4)	Staying at Tamara's – 2 (+/–); Wanted on Voyage – 40 (–6)
Not3s; Mabel	"Fine Line" "My Lover"	N/A	N/A
Little Mix	"Think About Us"	N/A	LM5 – 21 (+1); Glory Days – 60 (+3)
Sam Fender	"Play God"	N/A	N/A

=== Main show ===
Performer(s)	Song	UK Singles Chart reaction (week ending 28 February 2019)	UK Albums Chart reaction (week ending 28 February 2019)
Hugh Jackman	"The Greatest Show"	80 (–1)	The Greatest Showman: Original Motion Picture Soundtrack – 2 (+/–)
George Ezra; Hot 8 Brass Band	"Shotgun"	27 (+5)	Staying at Tamara's – 5 (+2); Wanted on Voyage – 43 (+8)
Little Mix; Ms. Banks	"Woman Like Me"	88 (–6)	LM5 – 34 (–5); Glory Days – 65 (+11)
Jorja Smith	"Don't Watch Me Cry"	N/A	Lost & Found – 47 (re-entry)
Calvin Harris; Rag'n'Bone Man; Sam Smith; Dua Lipa	"Giant" "Promises" "One Kiss"	4 (+2); 50 (+/–); 69 (+9)	Calvin Harris; N/A Rag'n'Bone Man; Human – 68 (re-entry) Sam Smith; In the Lonely Hour – 53 (+1); The Thrill of It All – 83 (+3) Dua Lipa; Dua Lipa – 15 (–1)
Jess Glynne; H.E.R.	"Thursday"	41 (–2)	Always In Between – 12 (–2); I Cry When I Laugh – 50 (–1)
The 1975	"Sincerity Is Scary"	N/A	A Brief Inquiry Into Online Relationships – 23 (+18)
P!nk; Dan Smith	"Walk Me Home" "Just like Fire" "Just Give Me a Reason" "Try" "What About Us"	N/A	Greatest Hits... So Far!!! – 55 (+44)

== Winners and nominees ==
The nominations were revealed on 12 January 2019.

British Album of the Year (presented by Jared Leto)	Special Achievement Awards
The 1975 – A Brief Inquiry into Online Relationships; Anne-Marie – Speak Your Mind; Florence and the Machine – High as Hope; George Ezra – Staying at Tamara's; Jorja Smith – Lost & Found	British Producer of the Year: Calvin Harris (presented by Annie Mac and Suki Waterhouse); Global Success Award: Ed Sheeran (presented by Abbey Clancy and Roman Kemp); Outstanding Contribution to Music: Pink (presented by Khalid)
British Single of the Year (presented by Liam Payne and Winnie Harlow)	British Artist Video of the Year (presented by Bros)
Calvin Harris and Dua Lipa – "One Kiss"; Anne-Marie – "2002"; Clean Bandit featuring Demi Lovato – "Solo"; Dua Lipa – "IDGAF"; George Ezra – "Shotgun"; Jess Glynne – "I'll Be There"; Ramz – "Barking"; Rudimental featuring Jess Glynne, Macklemore and Dan Caplen – "These Days"; Sigala and Paloma Faith – "Lullaby"; Tom Walker – "Leave a Light On"	Little Mix featuring Nicki Minaj – "Woman Like Me"; Anne-Marie – "2002"; Calvin Harris and Dua Lipa – "One Kiss"; Clean Bandit featuring Demi Lovato – "Solo"; Dua Lipa – "IDGAF"; Jax Jones featuring Ina Wroldsen – "Breathe"; Jonas Blue featuring Jack & Jack – "Rise"; Liam Payne and Rita Ora – "For You"; Rita Ora – "Let You Love Me"; Rudimental featuring Jess Glynne, Macklemore and Dan Caplen – "These Days"
British Male Solo Artist (presented by Daniel Sturridge and Paloma Faith)	British Female Solo Artist (presented by H.E.R. and Nile Rodgers)
George Ezra; Aphex Twin; Craig David; Giggs; Sam Smith	Jorja Smith; Anne-Marie; Florence and the Machine; Jess Glynne; Lily Allen
British Group (presented by Natalie Dormer and Vicky McClure)	British Breakthrough Act (presented by Alice Levine and Clara Amfo)
The 1975; Arctic Monkeys; Gorillaz; Little Mix; Years & Years	Tom Walker; Ella Mai; Idles; Jorja Smith; Mabel
International Male Solo Artist (presented by Jack Whitehall)	International Female Solo Artist (presented by Jack Whitehall)
Drake; Eminem; Kamasi Washington; Shawn Mendes; Travis Scott	Ariana Grande; Camila Cabello; Cardi B; Christine and the Queens; Janelle Monáe
International Group (presented by Jack Whitehall)	Critics' Choice Award (presented by Clara Amfo)
The Carters; Brockhampton; Chic; First Aid Kit; Twenty One Pilots	Sam Fender; Lewis Capaldi; Mahalia

== Multiple nominations and awards ==
Artists with the most nominations

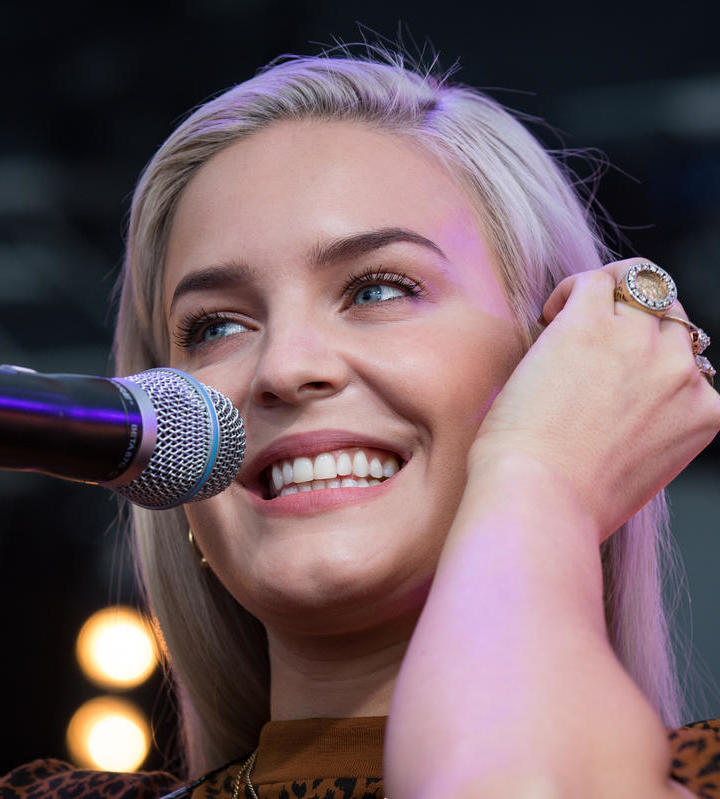
Anne-Marie (4)

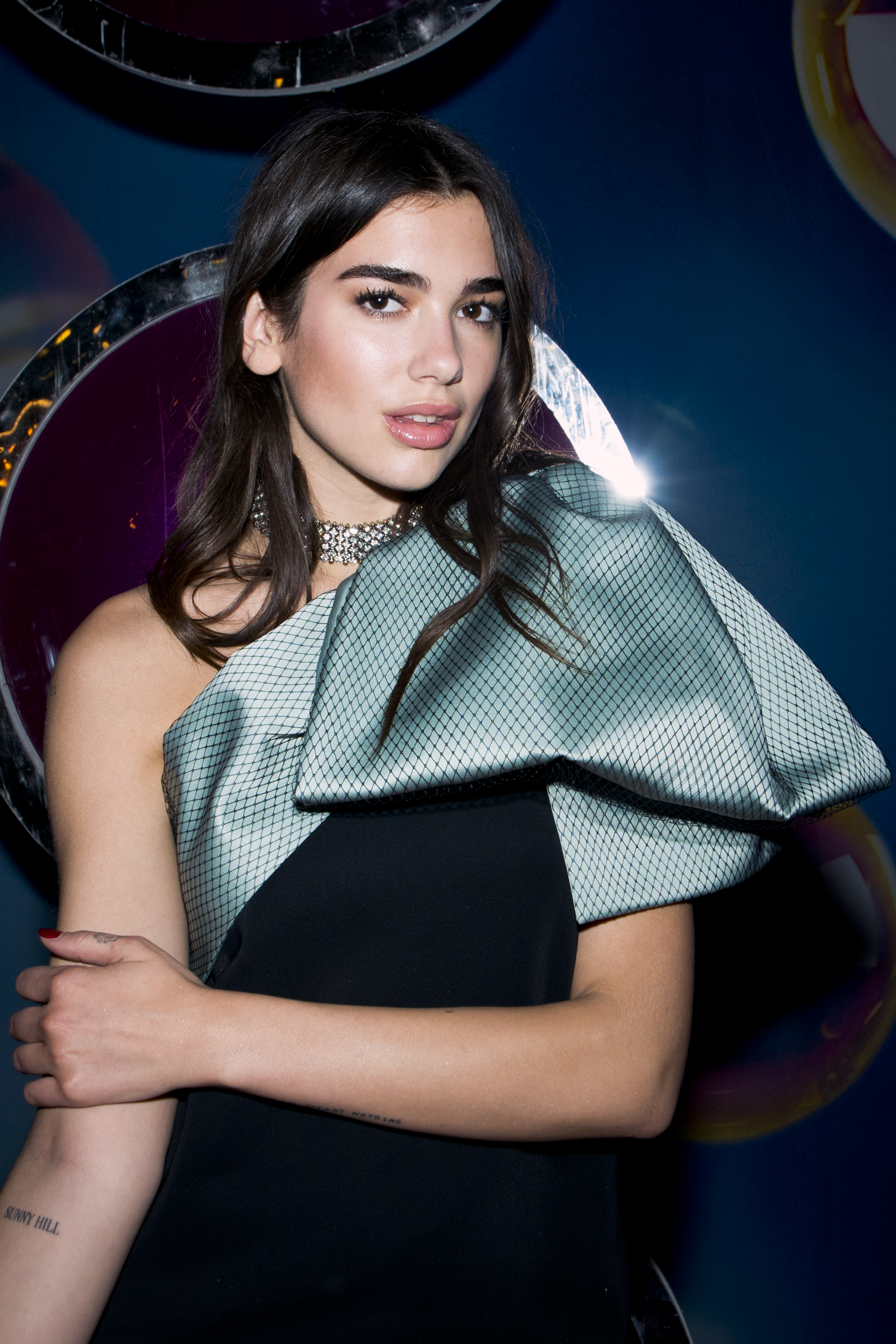
Dua Lipa (4)

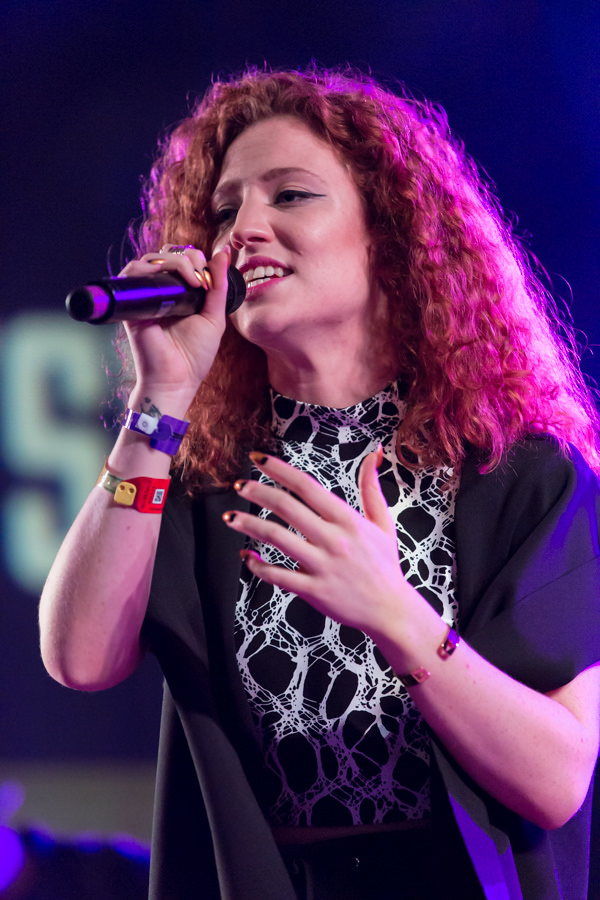
Jess Glynne (4)

Artists with the most awards

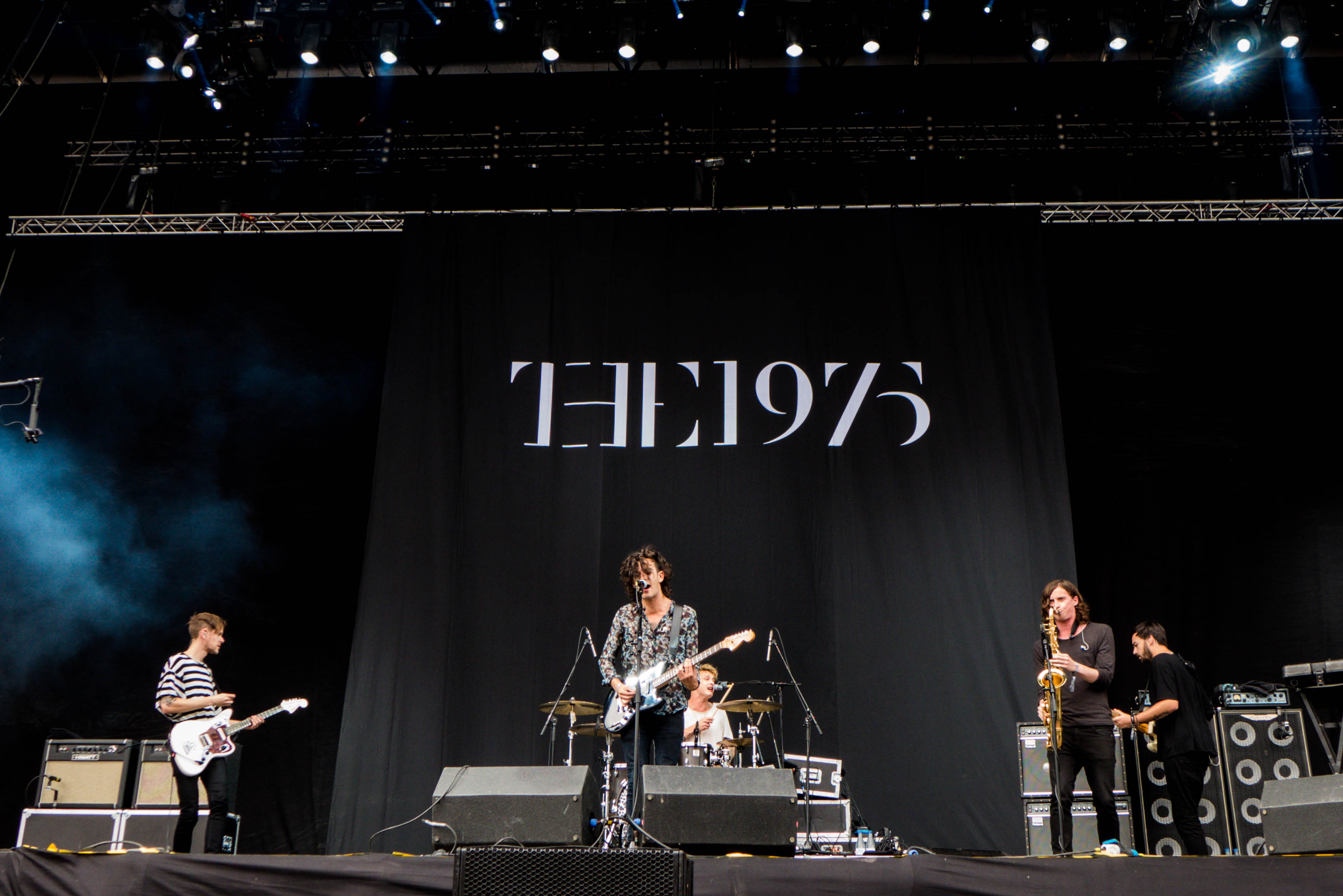
The 1975 (2)

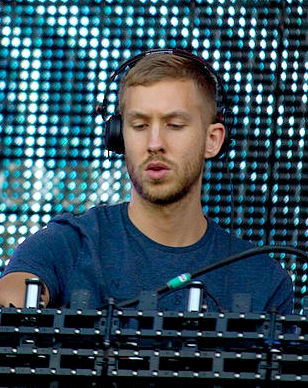
Calvin Harris (2)

Artists who received multiple nominations
Nominations	Artist
4	Anne-Marie
4	Dua Lipa
4	Jess Glynne
3	George Ezra
3	Jorja Smith
2	The 1975
2	Calvin Harris
2	Clean Bandit
2	Dan Caplen
2	Demi Lovato
2	Florence and the Machine
2	Little Mix
2	Macklemore
2	Rita Ora
2	Rudimental
2	Tom Walker

Artists who won multiple awards
Awards	Artist
2	The 1975
2	Calvin Harris

== YouTube Music and Facebook hosts ==
On 14 February 2019, it was announced that Capital FM Breakfast Show host Vick Hope and Todrick Hall would host the YouTube Music Live Stream from 7:45pm GMT and it was also announced on the same day, that Jamie Laing and Yasmin Evans would host the Facebook Red Carpet Live Stream from 4:30pm GMT.
