= Bryony Gordon =

English journalist (born 1980)

- Born: Bryony Naomi Gordon; 5 July 1980 (age 46); Hammersmith, London, England
- Occupations: Journalist, memoirist
- Spouse: Harry Wilson (m. 2013)
- Children: 1

Bryony Naomi Gordon (born 5 July 1980) is an English journalist, author, broadcaster and podcaster. She is the author of the novels Mad Girl, You Got This, and The Wrong Knickers which were all nominated for British Book Awards. She founded Mental Health Mates in 2016 and hosts the Mad World podcast.

== Early life ==
Gordon is the daughter of Sunday Mirror former gossip columnist Jane Gordon. She was educated at a Kew College primary school and later attended the independent Queen's Gate School (an all-girls school) in South Kensington. She briefly studied History of Art at University College London before dropping out after one term.

== Career ==
Gordon began her career as an intern for the Daily Express, writing occasional feature articles for the newspaper. She then began writing a youth-oriented column for the Sunday Express, before writing for The Daily Telegraph's teen supplement in 2000. In 2001, Gordon joined the Daily Mirror gossip column known as The 3AM Girls. After the Mirror, Gordon resumed writing for The Daily Telegraph.

Until 2006, Gordon wrote the "Notebook" column which appears each Thursday in The Daily Telegraph, as well as additional special features, such as interviews with public figures. She also writes the "How the Other Half Lives" column for The Sunday Telegraph's Stella magazine. In 2007, Gordon was shortlisted for Young Journalist of the Year, at the British Press Awards. Gordon also wrote for the Telegraph blogs section.

In June 2014, Gordon published her first book, The Wrong Knickers: A Decade of Chaos, a memoir. In 2016, Gordon published her second book, Mad Girl, a memoir about her struggles with obsessive-compulsive disorder (OCD), bulimia, alopecia and drug dependency.

In 2024, she joined the Daily Mail.

== Personal life ==
Gordon married Harry Wilson, a financial journalist, on 5 July 2013. They have a daughter and live in Clapham in London. Gordon ran in the London Marathon on 23 April 2017 to support mental health charities.

Gordon has been open about her mental health difficulties, including OCD and depression. In April 2017 she began her Mad World podcasts with an interview with Prince Harry. As of August 2018 Gordon is a sober, recovering alcoholic.

== Bibliography ==
- Gordon, Bryony (2014). The Wrong Knickers: A Decade of Chaos. Headline. ISBN 978-1472210159.
- Gordon, Bryony (2016). Mad Girl. Headline. ISBN 978-1472232083.
- Gordon, Bryony (2018). Eat, Drink, Run: How I Got Fit Without Going Too Mad. ISBN 978-1472234025
- Gordon, Bryony (2020). Glorious Rock Bottom. Headline. ISBN 978-1472253750.
- Gordon, Bryony (2021). No Such Thing As Normal. Headline. ISBN 978-1472284129.
- Gordon, Bryony (2024). Mad Woman. Headline. ISBN 978-1035408689.
