= List of awards and nominations received by Little Mix =

Little Mix awards and nominations
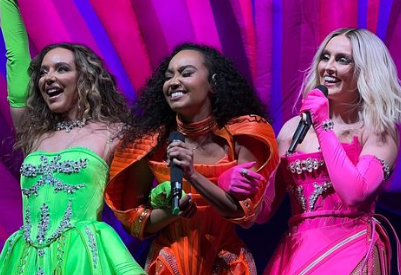
- Little Mix in 2022
Awards and nominations
| Award | Wins | Nominations |
| BBC Radio 1 Teen Awards | 4 | 9 |
| Billboard Latin Music Awards | 0 | 1 |
| BIMA Awards | 1 | 1 |
| Bravo Otto | 3 | 4 |
| BRIT Awards | 3 | 12 |
| CelebMix Awards | 1 | 13 |
| Glamour Awards | 4 | 5 |
| Global Awards | 6 | 10 |
| iHeartRadio Music Awards | 1 | 4 |
| Japan Gold Disc Award | 2 | 2 |
| MTV Europe Music Awards | 7 | 14 |
| MTV Video Music Award | 0 | 1 |
| Nickelodeon Kids' Choice Awards | 1 | 1 |
| Meus Prêmios Nick | 1 | 1 |
| Popjustice £20 Music Prize | 3 | 8 |
| Radio Disney Music Awards | 1 | 2 |
| Shorty Awards | 0 | 3 |
| Silver Clef Award | 1 | 1 |
| Teen Choice Awards | 2 | 12 |

Totals (Note: Certain award groups do not simply award one winner. They acknowledge several different recipients, have runners-up, and have third place. Since this is a specific recognition and is different from losing an award, runner-up mentions are considered wins in this award tally. For simplification and to avoid errors, each award in this list has been presumed to have had a prior nomination.)
- Wins: 58
- Nominations: 151

Little Mix are a British girl group, consisting of group members Perrie Edwards, Jade Thirlwall, and Leigh-Anne Pinnock. Former member, Jesy Nelson left the group in December 2020. The group rose to fame in 2011 after they became the first group to win the British version of The X Factor, and have emerged as one of the show's most successful acts. Since their formation the group have established themselves as the biggest girl group of the 2010s, selling over 60 million worldwide records to date, making them one of the best-selling girl group of all time.

Little Mix have been nominated and are the recipient of numerous awards throughout their career. They have received a total of 12 nominations at the Brit Awards making them the most nominated female group, three of which they won. During the 2017 Brit Awards, Little Mix won their first ever Brit Award for Best British Single for "Shout Out to My Ex", making them the first girl group since Girls Aloud in 2009, to receive one. Later in 2019 they won their second Brit Award for "Woman Like Me", which won the fan-voted award for British Artist Video of the Year. This made them the first girl group to win the award since the Spice Girls in 1997. At the 2021 Brit Awards, they made history by becoming the first girl group in its 43-year history to win the award for Best British Group.

Little Mix holds the record for the most nominations and award wins for Best UK & Ireland act at the MTV Europe Music Awards. They have received a total of seven nominations and won six awards, also making them the most nominated and awarded female group and act in this category. As of 2021, they are joint with Dua Lipa as the most awarded act at the Global Awards, receiving a total of six awards wins out of ten nominations. Their other nominations include 1 Billboard Latin Music Awards, 1 Nickelodeon Kids' Choice Awards, 4 iHeartRadio Music Awards, 1 MTV Video Music Award (VMAs), 12 Teen Choice Awards, 4 BBC Radio 1 Teen Awards, 15 MTV Europe Music Awards, and a National Television Award.

Little Mix have been recognised for their activism towards the LGBT community. At the 2018 Attitude Awards, they was awarded for using their platform to advocate for LGBT+ equality. Later in 2019, they were awarded at the British LGBT Awards for their commitment towards the LGBT community. During the LM5: The Tour, they were also awarded for their 12 headline shows at the O2 Arena. In 2021 they were awarded the Women of the Year Gamechangers in Music at the Glamour Awards. The group other accolades also include 6 MTV Europe Music Awards, 4 BBC Radio 1 Teen Awards, 4 Glamour Awards, 2 Japanese Gold Disc Awards, 2 Teen Choice Awards, 1 Radio Disney Music Award, 1 iHeartRadio Music Award, and 1 Nickelodeon Kids' Choice Awards.

== Attitude Awards ==
The Attitude Awards is hosted by British magazine Attitude to honor the LGBT+ community and its allies.

| Year | Nominee / work | Award | Result | Ref. |
|---|---|---|---|---|
| 2018 | Little Mix | Honorary Gay Award | Won | |

== BBC Radio 1 Teen Awards ==
The BBC Radio 1 Teen Awards is an award show by the British radio station BBC Radio 1 to honor the top artists in music and acting of the year. Little Mix have received four awards from nine nominations.

| Year | Nominee / work | Award | Result | Ref. |
|---|---|---|---|---|
| 2013 | Little Mix | Best British Group | Nominated | |
| 2015 | Little Mix | Best British Group | Nominated | |
| 2015 | Little Mix | Embrace Your Uniqueness | Won | |
| 2015 | "Black Magic" | Best British Single | Nominated | |
| 2016 | Little Mix | Best British Group | Nominated | |
| 2017 | Little Mix | Best British Group | Won | |
| 2018 | Little Mix | Best British Group | Won | |
| 2019 | Little Mix | Best Group | Won | |

- Note: Member Jade Thirlwall received a nomination on the Most Entertaining Celeb category in 2017.

== Billboard Latin Music Awards ==
The Billboard Latin Music Awards grew out of the Billboard Music Awards program from the US magazine Billboard, a trade publication for the music industry.

| Year | Nominee / work | Award | Result | Ref. |
|---|---|---|---|---|
| 2018 | Little Mix | Crossover Artist of the Year | Nominated | |

== Bravo Otto ==
Established in 1957, the Bravo Otto is an accolade presented by the German magazine Bravo.

| Year | Nominee / work | Award | Result | Ref. |
|---|---|---|---|---|
| 2013 | Little Mix | Newcomer of the Year | Gold | |
| 2018 | Little Mix | Best Band/Duo | Nominated | |
| 2019 | Little Mix | Best Band/Duo | Gold | |
| 2020 | Little Mix | Best Band/Duo | Gold | |
| 2021 | Little Mix | Best Band/Duo | Nominated | |

== Brit Awards ==
First awarded in 1977, the Brit Awards are the highest profile music awards ceremony in the UK. Little Mix has received three awards from ten nominations.

| Year | Nominee / work | Award | Result | Ref. |
|---|---|---|---|---|
2016
| 2016 | "Black Magic" | British Single of the Year | Nominated | |
| 2016 | "Black Magic" | British Video of the Year | Nominated | |
2017
| 2017 | Little Mix | British Group | Nominated | |
| 2017 | "Shout Out to My Ex" | British Single of the Year | Won | |
| 2017 | "Hair" (featuring Sean Paul) | British Video of the Year | Nominated | |
| 2018 | "Touch" | British Single of the Year | Nominated | |
| 2018 | "Touch" | British Video of the Year | Nominated | |
| 2019 | Little Mix | British Group | Nominated | |
| 2019 | "Woman Like Me" (featuring Nicki Minaj) | British Video of the Year | Won | |
| 2021 | Little Mix | British Group | Won | |
| 2022 | Little Mix | British Group | Nominated | |
| 2022 | "Heartbreak Anthem" (with Galantis and David Guetta) | Best International Song | Nominated | |

== BIMA Awards ==
| Year | Nominee / work | Award | Result | Ref. |
|---|---|---|---|---|
| 2016 | Little Mix | Media and Entertainment | Won | |

== British LGBT Awards ==
The British LGBT Awards are a British award show that aim to recognize individuals and organisations that display "outstanding" commitment to the LGBT community. LGBT celebrities or straight allies are among the people that are recognised. Little Mix have received one award from two nominations.

| Year | Nominee / work | Award | Result | Ref. |
|---|---|---|---|---|
| 2019 | Little Mix | Celebrity Ally | Nominated | |
| 2019 | Little Mix | Change Makers | Won | |

== Bizarre Awards ==
| Year | Nominee / work | Award | Result | Ref. |
|---|---|---|---|---|
| 2015 | Little Mix | Women of the Year | Won | |
| 2016 | Glory Days | Album of the Year | Won | |

== Beano Awards ==
| Year | Nominee / work | Award | Result | Ref. |
|---|---|---|---|---|
| 2017 | "Power" (featuring Stormzy) | Pop Song of the Year | Won | |
| 2019 | Little Mix | Favourite Music Artist | Won | |

== CelebMix Awards ==
The CelebMix Awards is an annual international award show which honours international acts in music, film, TV, and media. Little Mix received 13 nominations and one win. Two of the members of the band have received two nominations in three years for Biggest Inspiration; Leigh-Anne Pinnock and Jesy Nelson.

| Year | Nominee / work | Award | Result | Ref. |
|---|---|---|---|---|
| 2017 | Little Mix | Best Group | Nominated | |
| 2017 | Glory Days Tour | Best Tour | Nominated | |
| 2017 | Mixers | Best Fandom | Nominated | |
| 2018 | "Woman Like Me" | Single of the Year | Nominated | |
| 2018 | LM5 | Album of the Year | Nominated | |
| 2018 | Little Mix | Best Group | Nominated | |
| 2018 | Mixers | Best Fandom | Nominated | |
| 2019 | Little Mix | Best Group | Won | |
| 2019 | Mixers | Best Fandom | Nominated | |
| 2020 | "Sweet Melody" | Song of the Year | Nominated | |
| 2020 | Little Mix | Artist of the Year | Nominated | |
| 2020 | Mixers | Best Fandom | Nominated | |
| 2020 | Little Mix | Cybersmile of the Year | Nominated | |

== Cosmopolitan Ultimate Women Awards ==
Cosmopolitan is an international group of magazines for women. It was first published in 1886 in the United States as a family magazine, was later transformed into a literary magazine and eventually became a women's magazine in the late 1960s. Cosmopolitan(UK) presents The Cosmopolitan Ultimate Women of the Year Awards celebrates the achievements made in the past year by women. The show honours achievements made by inspiring female celebrities.

| Year | Nominee / work | Award | Result | Ref. |
|---|---|---|---|---|
| 2013 | Little Mix | Ultimate Export | Won | |
| 2015 | Little Mix | The Ultimate Girl Group | Won | |

== DAF BAMA Music Awards ==
The DAF Bama Music Awards is an international multicultural music award show presented by Daf Entertainment based in Hamburg, Germany. It has been created to honor artists from all over the world and at the same time unite the world with something as beautiful as music.

| Year | Nominee / work | Award | Result | Ref. |
|---|---|---|---|---|
| 2017 | Little Mix | Best Duo/Group | Nominated | |
| 2017 | Little Mix | BAMA People Choice Award | Nominated | |
| 2017 | Little Mix | Best European Act | Nominated | |
| 2017 | Little Mix | Best UK Act | Nominated | |
| 2018 | Little Mix | Best Group | Nominated | |
| 2018 | LM5 | Best Album | Nominated | |

== Daily Music Awards Hungary ==
| Year | Nominee / work | Award | Result | Ref. |
|---|---|---|---|---|
| 2020 | Little Mix | Best Group | Nominated | |
| 2021 | Little Mix | Best Group | Nominated | |
| 2021 | "Confetti" (featuring Saweetie) | Best Music Video | Won | |

== European Diversity Awards ==
The European Diversity Awards is an annual award created by Linda Riley, managing director of Square Peg Media in 2012, to honour individuals and organisations who work to help create a more inclusive society in Europe.

| Year | Nominee / work | Award | Result | Ref. |
|---|---|---|---|---|
| 2019 | Little Mix | Media Icon of the Year | Nominated | |

== Girls Choice Awards ==
| Year | Nominee / work | Award | Result | Ref. |
|---|---|---|---|---|
| 2019 | Little Mix | Most Empowering Music Group of the Year | Nominated | |

== Glamour Awards ==
The Glamour Awards is hosted by Glamour magazine every year to hand out different awards to honour extraordinary and inspirational women from a variety of fields, including entertainment, business, sports, music, science, medicine, education and politics. The awards started in 2003 and are hosted every May and June in the United Kingdom. Little Mix have been nominated for five awards and have won four.

| Year | Nominee / work | Award | Result | Ref. |
|---|---|---|---|---|
| 2012 | Little Mix | Band of the Year | Nominated | |
| 2014 | Little Mix | Band of the Year | Won | |
| 2016 | Little Mix | Music Act of the Year | Won | |
| 2017 | Little Mix | Music Act of the Year | Won | |
| 2021 | Little Mix | Gamechangers in Music | Won | |

== Global Awards ==
The Global Awards are held by Global and rewards music played on British radio stations owned by the Global media company. Little Mix has won six out of eleven nominations, the most of any artist.

| Year | Nominee / work | Award | Result | Ref. |
|---|---|---|---|---|
| 2018 | Little Mix | Best Group | Won | |
| 2018 | Little Mix | Best British Artist or Group | Won | |
| 2018 | Little Mix | Best Pop | Nominated | |
| 2018 | "Power" (featuring Stormzy) | Best Song | Won | |
| 2019 | "Woman Like Me" (featuring Nicki Minaj) | Best Song | Won | |
| 2019 | Little Mix | Best Group | Won | |
| 2019 | Little Mix | Best British Artist or Group | Nominated | |
| 2019 | Little Mix | Best Pop | Nominated | |
| 2020 | Little Mix | Best Group | Nominated | |
| 2021 | Little Mix | Best Group | Won | |
| 2022 | Little Mix | Best Group | Nominated | |

== Grammis Awards ==
The Grammis are a music awards presented annually to musicians and songwriters in Sweden by IFPI Sverige.

| Year | Nominee / work | Award | Result | Ref. |
|---|---|---|---|---|
| 2022 | "Heartbreak Anthem" (with Galantis and David Guetta) | Electro/Dance of the Year | Nominated | |

== iHeartRadio Music Awards ==
The iHeartRadio Music Awards is a music awards show, founded by iHeartRadio in 2014, to recognise the most popular artists and music over the past year as determined by the network's listeners. Little Mix have won one out of four nominations.

| Year | Nominee / work | Award | Result | Ref. |
|---|---|---|---|---|
| 2016 | Mixers | Best Fan Army | Nominated | |
| 2018 | Mixers | Best Fan Army | Nominated | |
| 2018 | "Reggaetón Lento (Remix)" (with CNCO) | Best Remix | Won | |
| 2022 | "Heartbreak Anthem" (with Galantis and David Guetta) | Dance Song of The Year | Nominated | |

- Note: Member Perrie Edwards received a nomination on the Cutest Musician's Pet category with her dog Hatchi in 2019.

== I Talk Telly Awards ==
| Year | Nominee / work | Award | Result | Ref. |
|---|---|---|---|---|
| 2020 | Little Mix: The Search | Best Talent Show | Won | |

== Japan Gold Disc Awards ==
The Japan Gold Disc Awards (日本ゴールドディスク大賞) for music sales in the Recording Industry Association of Japan is a major music awards held annually in Japan. Little Mix have received two awards out of two nominations.

| Year | Nominee / work | Award | Result | Ref. |
|---|---|---|---|---|
| 2014 | Little Mix | Best 3 New Artists | Won | |
| 2014 | Little Mix | New Artist of the Year | Won | |

== Latin Music Italian Awards ==
The Latin Music Italian Awards is a musical event that takes place annually in the city of Milan, organized by Latin Music Official.

| Year | Nominee / work | Award | Result | Ref. |
|---|---|---|---|---|
| 2017 | "Reggaeton Lento (Remix)" (with CNCO) | Best Latin Collaboration of the Year | Won | |

== Metro UK Awards ==
The Metro Celeb of the Year Award is delivered annually by Metro.

| Year | Nominee / work | Award | Result | Ref. |
|---|---|---|---|---|
| 2020 | Little Mix | Celeb of the Year | Won | |

== MTV Awards ==
=== MTV Europe Music Awards ===
The MTV Europe Music Awards was established in 1994 by MTV Europe to reward the music videos from European and international artists. Little Mix have received seven awards from 14 nominations.

| Year | Nominee / work | Award | Result | Ref. |
|---|---|---|---|---|
| 2014 | Little Mix | Best UK & Ireland Act | Nominated | |
| 2015 | Little Mix | Best UK & Ireland Act | Won | |
| 2015 | Little Mix | Worldwide Act: Europe | Nominated | |
| 2016 | Little Mix | Best UK & Ireland Act | Won | |
| 2017 | Little Mix | Best UK & Ireland Act | Nominated | |
| 2018 | Little Mix | Best UK & Ireland Act | Won | |
| 2019 | Little Mix | Best UK & Ireland Act | Won | |
| 2019 | Little Mix | Best Group | Nominated | |
| 2020 | Little Mix | Best UK & Ireland Act | Won | |
| 2020 | Little Mix | Best Group | Nominated | |
| 2020 | Little Mix | Best Pop | Won | |
| 2020 | Little Mix Uncancelled | Best Virtual Live | Nominated | |
| 2021 | Little Mix | Best Group | Nominated | |
| 2021 | Little Mix | Best UK & Ireland Act | Won | |

=== MTV Video Music Award ===
The American MTV Video Music Award (VMAs) is an award show by the cable network MTV to honour the top music videos of the year.

| Year | Nominee / work | Award | Result | Ref. |
|---|---|---|---|---|
| 2020 | Little Mix | Best Group | Nominated | |

=== MTV Italian Music Awards ===
The MTV Music Awards Italy are an annual award ceremony hosted by MTV Italy. The ceremony awards the best video, performers, and artists of the year.

| Year | Nominee / work | Award | Result | Ref. |
|---|---|---|---|---|
| 2013 | Little Mix | Artist Saga | Nominated | |
| 2014 | Little Mix | Artist Saga | Nominated | |
| 2016 | Little Mix | Artist Saga | Nominated | |
| 2016 | Little Mix | Best International Band | Nominated | |
| 2017 | Little Mix | Artist Saga | Nominated | |

=== MTV Video Music Awards Japan ===
The MTV Video Music Awards Japan are the Japanese version of the MTV Video Music Awards.

Like the MTV Video Music Awards in the United States, in this event artists are rewarded for their songs and videos through online voting from the same channel viewers. Initially Japan was part of the MTV Asia Awards, which included all Asian countries, but because of the musical variety existent in Japan, in May 2002 they began to hold their own awards independently.

| Year | Nominee / work | Award | Result | Ref. |
|---|---|---|---|---|
| 2015 | "Dreaming Together" (Flower feat. Little Mix) | Best Collaboration | Nominated | |

== Melty Future Awards ==
The Melty Future Awards is a French award, which takes place at the beginning of each year to congratulate those artists who will be talked about in the coming months.

| Year | Nominee / work | Award | Result | Ref. |
|---|---|---|---|---|
| 2016 | Little Mix | Spécial International Women | Won | |

== Myx Music Awards ==
The Myx Music Awards is an annual awards show in the Philippines that honours both Filipino and international music.

| Year | Nominee / work | Award | Result | Ref. |
|---|---|---|---|---|
| 2017 | "Shout Out To My Ex" | Favourite International Video | Nominated | |
| 2018 | "Touch" | Favourite International Video | Nominated | |

== Nickelodeon Kids' Choice Awards ==
The Nickelodeon Kids' Choice Awards, also known as the KCAs or Kids Choice Awards, is an annual awards show that airs on the Nickelodeon cable channel. It is usually held on a Saturday night in late March or early April and honours the year's biggest television, movie, and music acts, as voted by Nickelodeon viewers. Little Mix had one nomination and one win.

=== Nickelodeon Kids' Choice Awards ===
| Year | Nominee / work | Award | Result | Ref. |
|---|---|---|---|---|
| 2017 | Little Mix | Favorite Global Music Star | Won | |

=== Meus Prêmios Nick ===
| Year | Nominee / work | Award | Result | Ref. |
|---|---|---|---|---|
| 2017 | Little Mix | Favorite International Artist | Won | |

=== Nickelodeon UK Kids' Choice Awards ===
| Year | Nominee / work | Award | Result | Ref. |
|---|---|---|---|---|
| 2012 | Little Mix | Favourite UK Band | Nominated | |
| 2012 | Little Mix | Favourite UK Newcomer | Nominated | |
| 2013 | Little Mix | Favourite UK Band | Nominated | |

== Now 100 Music Awards ==
Little Mix received three nominations and two wins for the Now Music 100 Awards in 2018.

| Year | Nominee / work | Award | Result |
|---|---|---|---|
| 2018 | "Black Magic" | Song of the Now Years | Nominated |
| 2018 | "Black Magic" | Best Song of the Teens | Won |
| 2018 | Little Mix | Best Now Group | Won |

== Number1 Video Music Awards ==
The Number1 Video Music Awards (Number1 Video Müzik Ödülleri) is an award show by the Turkish radio and TV Channel Number1, that recognize the best in music.

| Year | Nominee / work | Award | Result | Ref. |
|---|---|---|---|---|
| 2021 | Little Mix | Best Foreign Singer | Nominated | |

== National Television Awards ==
| Year | Nominee / work | Award | Result | Ref. |
|---|---|---|---|---|
| 2021 | Little Mix: The Search | Best Talent Show | Nominated | |

== Popjustice's Twenty Quid Music Prize ==
The Popjustice £20 Music Prize, also known as the Popjustice Twenty Quid Prize, is an annual prize awarded by music website Popjustice to recognise the best British pop single of the previous year. The prize was conceived by Popjustice founder Peter Robinson in 2003 as a reaction to what he perceived as the pompous and elitist nature of the existing Mercury Prize, which recognises the best album of the previous year, and in particular its exclusion of pop music acts in favour of those from more esoteric genres. The shortlist for the Popjustice prize is announced in September of each year and the winner named the following month, to coincide with the presentation of the Mercury Prize. Popjustice gives a token prize of £20 to the winner of its award, in contrast to the £20,000 given to the winner of the Mercury Prize.

| Year | Nominee / work | Award | Result | Ref. |
|---|---|---|---|---|
| 2012 | "Wings" | Track of the Year | Nominated | |
| 2013 | "DNA" | Track of the Year | Nominated | |
| 2014 | "Move" | Track of the Year | Won | |
| 2015 | "Black Magic" | Track of the Year | Won | |
| 2016 | "Love Me Like You" | Track of the Year | Nominated | |
| 2017 | "Touch" | Track of the Year | Won | |
| 2020 | "Break Up Song" | Track of the Year | Nominated | |
| 2021 | "Sweet Melody" | Track of the Year | Nominated | |

== The Pop Hub Awards ==
The Pop Hub Awards is an annual internet fan-voted award show in Poland.

| Year | Nominee / work | Award | Result | Ref. |
|---|---|---|---|---|
| 2019 | LM5 | Album of the Year | Won | |
| 2021 | Little Mix | Favorite Music Group | Nominated | |
| 2021 | Sweet Melody | Favorite Dance Track | Nominated | |
| 2021 | Sweet Melody | Best Choreography | Nominated | |
| 2021 | Mixers | Biggest Fans | Nominated | |
| 2022 | No | Favorite Music Video - Pop | Won | |
| 2022 | Confetti (feat. Saweetie) | Best Cooperation | Won | |

== Pure Beauty Magazine Award ==
| Year | Nominee / work | Award | Result | Ref. |
|---|---|---|---|---|
| 2014 | Little Mix | Best New Eye Product | Won | |

== Radio Disney Music Awards ==
The Radio Disney Music Awards is an annual awards show by Radio Disney. The awards honor the year's biggest achievements in music, voted by teen viewers. Winners receive a full-size Golden Mickey Mouse designed with the graphics of that year's show. The ceremony is not televised beyond commercial interstitial segments for Disney Channel. Little Mix have received two nominations and one win.

| Year | Nominee / work | Award | Result | Ref. |
|---|---|---|---|---|
| 2014 | "Wings" | Best Song to Dance To | Nominated | |
| 2017 | "Shout Out to My Ex" | Best Break-Up Song | Won | |

== Series Em Cena Awards ==
The Series Em Cena Awards, also known as SEC Awards, are an annual awards host by Séries em Cena, an editorial partner of MTV Brasil.

| Year | Nominee / work | Award | Result | Ref. |
|---|---|---|---|---|
| 2021 | Little Mix | Music Group of the Year | Nominated | |

== Shorty Awards ==
The Shorty Awards, also known as the Shorties, are an annual awards event that honors the best short-form content creators on the micro-blogging website Twitter and on other social media sites. The awards have primarily been sponsored by the John S. and James L. Knight Foundation, and are organized by the co-founders of the Brooklyn-based startup company Sawhorse Media. Since their creation in 2008, the awards have expanded beyond Twitter to recognize content creation on other social networking sites, including YouTube, Tumblr, Foursquare, and Facebook.

| Year | Nominee / work | Award | Result | Ref. |
|---|---|---|---|---|
| 2014 | Little Mix | Best UK in Social Media | Nominated | |
| 2015 | Little Mix | Best Band | Nominated | |
| 2016 | Little Mix | Best Musician | Nominated | |

== Silver Clef Award ==
The Silver Clef Award is an annual UK music awards lunch which has been running since 1976.

| Year | Nominee / work | Award | Result | Ref. |
|---|---|---|---|---|
| 2017 | Little Mix | Best Live Act | Won | |

== SSE Live Awards ==
The SSE Live Awards are annual music awards which are voted and decided by the public, honouring the best live acts of the year at SSE venues.

| Year | Nominee / work | Award | Result | Ref. |
|---|---|---|---|---|
| 2019 | Little Mix | Best Group | Nominated | |

== Ticketmaster Awards ==
| Year | Nominee / work | Award | Result | Ref. |
|---|---|---|---|---|
| 2016 | Little Mix | Best Live Act | Nominated | |

== Tudo Information Awards ==
| Year | Nominee / work | Award | Result | Ref. |
|---|---|---|---|---|
| 2021 | Little Mix | International Group of the Year | Nominated | |

== 4Music Video honours ==
The 4Music Video Honours is an annual music awards show by 4Music, a music and entertainment channel in the United Kingdom and available on some digital television providers in the Republic of Ireland. Little Mix have received one award out of three nominations.

| Year | Nominee / work | Award | Result | Ref. |
|---|---|---|---|---|
| 2012 | Little Mix | Best Breakthrough | Nominated | |
| 2012 | Little Mix | Best Group | Nominated | |
| 2014 | Little Mix | Best Girl Group | Won | |

== Grape Juice Awards ==
That Grape Juice Awards are an annual award that happens towards the end of the year. In 2021, Little Mix was nominated for two categories.

| Year | Nominee / work | Award | Result | Ref. |
|---|---|---|---|---|
| 2021 | Love (Sweet Love) | Should have been a hit | Nominated | |
| 2021 | Little Mix | Best International Act | Nominated | |

== Teen Choice Awards ==
The Teen Choice Awards are presented annually by the Fox Broadcasting Company. Little Mix has received 2 awards from 12 nominations.

| Year | Nominee / work | Award | Result | Ref. |
|---|---|---|---|---|
| 2015 | Little Mix | Choice Music: International Artist | Won | |
| 2015 | Little Mix | Choice Music: Breakout Artist | Nominated | |
| 2015 | Little Mix | Choice Summer Music Star: Group | Nominated | |
| 2015 | Little Mix | Choice Music Group: Female | Nominated | |
| 2015 | "Black Magic" | Choice Music: Love Song | Nominated | |
| 2016 | Little Mix | Choice International Artist | Won | |
| 2016 | "Secret Love Song" (featuring Jason Derulo) | Choice Music: Love Song | Nominated | |
| 2017 | Little Mix | Choice Music Group | Nominated | |
| 2017 | "Shout Out to My Ex" | Choice Song: Group | Nominated | |
| 2017 | Little Mix | Choice Summer Group | Nominated | |
| 2019 | Little Mix | Choice International Artist | Nominated | |
| 2019 | Little Mix | Choice Summer Group | Nominated | |

== UK Music Video Awards ==
| Year | Nominee / work | Award | Result | Ref. |
|---|---|---|---|---|
| 2021 | "Sweet Melody" | Best Pop Video – UK | Nominated | |

== Other accolades ==
=== World records ===
Key
| † | Indicates a former record holder |

Name of publication, year the record was awarded, name of the record, and the name of the record holder
| Publication | Year | World record | Record holder | Ref. |
|---|---|---|---|---|
| Guinness World Records | 2017 | Most followed girl group on Snapchat | Little Mix | |
| Guinness World Records | 2021 | First female group to win Best British Group | Little Mix | |
| Guinness World Records | 2021 | Most streamed female group on Spotify | Little Mix † | |
