= Confetti (disambiguation) =

Confetti is small pieces of paper or plastic, thrown at celebrations, especially weddings.

Confetti may also refer to:

- Confetti candy, confectionery foods
- Confetti di Sulmona, an Italian candy of sugar-coated almonds
- Confetti (1927 film), a British drama film
- Confetti (1936 film), an Austrian comedy film
- Confetti (2006 film), a British mockumentary film

== Music ==
- Confetti (band), a British band in the early 1990s
- Confetti's, a Belgian new beat band in the late 1980s
- Confetti (Sérgio Mendes album), 1984
- Confetti (Little Birdy album), 2009
- Confetti (Little Mix album), 2020
  - "Confetti" (Little Mix song), the title track
  - The Confetti Tour, album-supporting concert tour by Little Mix in 2022
- Confetti, a 2019 mixtape by Jack Harlow
- "Confetti", a 2012 song by Tori Kelly from Handmade Songs
- "Confetti", a 2015 song by Hilary Duff from Breathe In. Breathe Out.
- "Confetti", a 2016 song by Sia from This Is Acting
- "Confetti", a 2023 song by Charlotte Cardin from 99 Nights
- "Confetti", a 2026 song by MiSaMo from Play
