= Holiday (Little Mix song) =

2020 single by Little Mix

Single by Little Mix

from the album Confetti
- Released: 24 July 2020
- Studio: Metropolis Studios, London, UK
- Genre: Pop
- Length: 3:33
- Label: RCA
- Songwriters: Jade Thirlwall; Perrie Edwards; Leigh-Anne Pinnock; Camille Purcell; Chris Loco; Frank Nobel; Linus Nordstrom
- Producers: Purcell; Goldfingers; Loco

Little Mix singles chronology
"Break Up Song" (2020)	"Holiday" (2020)	"Sweet Melody" (2020)

Music video
- "Holiday" on YouTube

"Holiday" is a song released by British girl group Little Mix, on 24 July 2020 as the second single from their sixth studio album Confetti (2020). It was co-written by members Jade Thirlwall, Perrie Edwards, Leigh-Anne Pinnock, alongside Chris Loco, Camille Purcell and Goldfinger; the latter who produced the song. It was written during a drunk session, with lyrics being inspired about how a boy can make them feel good. Described as a pop track with electro-pulsating bass lines, it was met with generally positive reviews from critics. It reached number fifteen on the UK Singles Chart, and charted in twelfth other music markets. It has been certified gold by the British Phonographic Industry (BPI) and Pro-Música Brasil (PMB).

== Composition ==
The song was said to include two choruses, one which is "fun and flirty" and the other being a "big singalong, let-your-hair-down moment".

== Critical reception ==
Attitude wrote "Giving us all the summery vibes, the ladies’ newest bop is the pop equivalent of taking a sweet, satisfying slurp of a Sex on the Beach cocktail." Sam Damshenas of Gay Times said "Holiday is a stripped back pop anthem with an electro-pulsating bass line." Alexis Petridis from The Guardian stated that it the shared comparisons with post-Daft Punk house on Holiday.

Official Charts wrote "Like the best kind of pop songs, it has two choruses, both of which are ridiculously catchy. The first is fun and flirty, reeling in the production to offer an inviting coo ("Touch me like a summer night, you feel like holiday), while the second is the big singalong, let-your-hair-down moment." Mitchelle Peters from Billboard said "The song offers a delectable bass line, top-notch vocals with sensual lyrics (“Touch me like a summer night, you feel like a holiday,” goes the chorus)."

== Promotion ==
Little Mix announced the song in a video posted to social media on 16 July 2020. Teasers for the song were released via Instagram using GIFs. The group released an Instagram Filter called "What Holiday?" to further promote the song. A short clip of the song was released while using the filter on Instagram prior to its release. A short clip of the track was released on the video-sharing social networking app TikTok to promote the song. A lyric video for the song was also released on the group's YouTube channel. On 7 August and 14 August, respectively, British singer-songwriter MNEK and Canadian DJ Frank Walker released remixes of "Holiday". On 31 August, both the acoustic version and the 220 Kid remix of the song were released.

== Music video ==
On 26 August 2020, Little Mix released a teaser for the music video for "Holiday". The music video was released on 28 August. The video displays the group as mermaids and goddesses lying on a beach. The video was filmed in front of a green screen, with band member Perrie Edwards described filming amidst the COVID-19 pandemic as a "very bizarre experience", stating that "everybody had to fill out forms, everybody had to wear masks and visors, there was only a certain number of people on set, we had to get our temperature taken, we had to stay far away from each other, and they are going to somehow superimpose it". Edwards also noted how "clever" the editing on the video is. On 4 September, a vertical video was released. On 9 September, a behind-the-scenes video was released.

== Live performances ==
On 21 August 2020, Little Mix performed "Holiday" for the first time as part of the set list for their "Little Mix Uncancelled" virtual concert. They also performed the song live on BBC Radio 1 Live Lounge on the 15 September 2020. The group performed the song on the semi-final of the talent competition show Little Mix The Search on 6 November 2020 alongside their single "Touch".

== Track listing ==
Digital download and streaming

1. "Holiday" – 3:33

Digital download and streaming – acoustic

1. "Holiday" (acoustic version) – 3:32

Digital download and streaming – MNEK remix

1. "Holiday" (MNEK remix) – 3:37

Digital download and streaming – Frank Walker remix

1. "Holiday" (Frank Walker remix) – 3:24

Digital download and streaming – 220 Kid remix

1. "Holiday" (220 Kid remix) – 3:24

Streaming – Holiday – EP

1. "Holiday" – 3:33
2. "Holiday" (acoustic version) – 3:32
3. "Holiday" (220 Kid remix) – 3:24
4. "Holiday" (Frank Walker remix) – 3:24
5. "Holiday" (MNEK remix) – 3:37

== Charts ==
Chart performance for "Holiday"
Chart (2020)	Peak position
Belgium (Ultratip Bubbling Under Flanders)	16
Belgium (Ultratip Bubbling Under Wallonia)	39
Bolivia Anglo (Monitor Latino)	13
Canadian Digital Songs (Billboard)	46
Croatia (HRT)	49
Euro Digital Songs (Billboard)	4
Hungary (Rádiós Top 40)	26
Hungary (Single Top 40)	19
Ireland (IRMA)	23
Netherlands (Dutch Top 40 Tipparade)	19
Netherlands (Single Tip)	18
New Zealand Hot Singles (RMNZ)	11
Scotland Singles (OCC)	3
Slovakia Airplay (ČNS IFPI)	94
Spain Digital Song Sales (Billboard)	5
Sweden Heatseeker (Sverigetopplistan)	19
UK Singles (OCC)	15
US Digital Song Sales (Billboard)	18

== Certifications ==
Region	Certification	Certified units/sales
Brazil (Pro-Música Brasil)	Gold	20,000^{‡}
United Kingdom (BPI)	Gold	400,000^{‡}
^{‡} Sales+streaming figures based on certification alone.

== Release history ==
Release dates and formats for "Holiday"
Region	Date	Format	Version	Label	Ref.
Various	24 July 2020	Digital download; streaming	Original	RCA UK	
Various	24 July 2020	Streaming	Remix EP	RCA UK	
Australia	31 July 2020	Contemporary hit radio	Original	RCA UK; Sony	
Various	7 August 2020	Digital download; streaming	MNEK remix	RCA UK	
Various	14 August 2020	Digital download; streaming	Frank Walker remix	RCA UK	
Various	31 August 2020	Digital download; streaming	Acoustic	RCA UK	
Various	31 August 2020	Digital download; streaming	220 Kid remix	RCA UK	
