= The Confetti Tour =

2022 concert tour by Little Mix

- Tour by Little Mix
- Location: Ireland; United Kingdom
- Associated album: Confetti
- Start date: 9 April 2022
- End date: 14 May 2022
- Legs: 1
- No. of shows: 28
- Supporting acts: Denis Coleman; Since September
- Attendance: 88,000 (6 shows)
- Box office: $6,226,612 (6 shows)

Little Mix concert chronology
- LM5: The Tour (2019); The Confetti Tour (2022)

The Confetti Tour was the seventh concert tour held by British girl group Little Mix, in support of their sixth studio album, Confetti (2020). It is the group's first tour without former member Jesy Nelson, who departed from the group in 2020, and was their last before the group went on hiatus in 2022. The tour began on 9 April 2022 at the SSE Arena in Belfast, and concluded on 14 May 2022 at The O_{2} Arena in London. The tour consisted of 25 sold-out shows across the United Kingdom and Ireland. On 14 May 2022, the band live streamed their final tour date at the O_{2} Arena, in London titled: Little Mix: The Last Show (For Now...).

The Confetti Tour received positive critical acclaim from critics. The ticketing fees from the tour were distributed between two charities, the Black Minds Matter UK and Nordoff–Robbins music therapy, while some of the proceeds from ticket sales for Little Mix: The Last Show (For Now...) was donated to the Child Poverty Action Group and Choose Love.

Following Little Mix's two dates at Glasgow, the OVO Hydro Arena announced that the group now hold the records for the most dates played at the arena by a group, the highest all time ticket sales at the arena and also the "most tickets sold for a single all-seated show by a musical act" in the arena's history.

== Background ==
The Confetti Tour was scheduled to take place from 28 April to 29 May 2021, in support of the group's sixth studio album Confetti. Dates included cities across Ireland and the United Kingdom. Tickets when on sale on 25 September 2020, with options of pre-sale tickets given to those who pre-ordered Confetti through the group's official website. Pre-sale tickets were available for three days before tickets were opened up to the general public On 25 September, additional tour dates for Dublin, Belfast, London and Birmingham were announced which was followed by other dates in Nottingham and Liverpool being announced a month later.

Following the conclusion of the group's reality TV competition Little Mix The Search in November 2020, the show's winners Since September were confirmed as the opening act for the Confetti Tour. In February 2021, amidst the COVID-19 pandemic, the group announced that The Confetti Tour would be postponed to 2022 in light of the UK's coronavirus restrictions. In May 2021, Perrie Edwards and Leigh-Anne Pinnock announced their respective pregnancies, which they said also contributed to the tour's postponement. The new tour dates started on 9 April 2022 at the SSE Arena in Belfast, and concluded with three dates at London's O_{2} Arena, the last of which was 14 May 2022. A new date at the Motorpoint Arena Cardiff, set for 3 May 2022, was also announced. Tickets went on sale on 12 February 2021. In December the same year, Little Mix announced that they would be going on hiatus after releasing their greatest hits album Between Us and the Confetti Tour. Later, American singer Denis Coleman was announced as an additional opening act for the tour. The ticketing fees from the tour will be shared between Black Minds Matter UK and Nordoff Robbins Music Therapy. £1 of the ticketing fees (per ticket), or €1 in Ireland, would be distributed between the two causes.

On 5 August 2022, it was reported that The Confetti Tour, was ranked as thirteen in top global tours so far in 2022.

== Critical reception ==
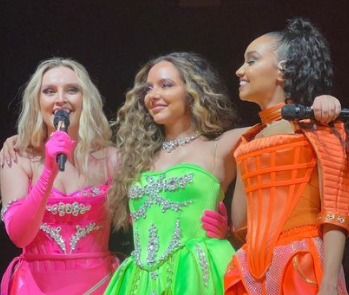
The group performing at the Utilita Arena in Newcastle, England

The Confetti Tour was met with positive reviews from critics. Simon Duke from The Chronicle, who attended the show at the Utilita Arena in Newcastle, gave their performance a five star rating and named it "as their best performance in the city to date".

Kath Hawthorne from The Guardian gave them a five star rating for their performance at the Utilita Arena in Newcastle. They wrote "Leigh-Anne Pinnock, Jade Thirlwall, and Perrie Edwards, have carried the torch for campy girl power, and in Newcastle, the trio show why their "hiatus" feels so bittersweet... For two hours the group gave a lesson on the last 10 years of British pop. Bubblegum dance track "Move" is introduced as “a classic”, while other major hits are given a refresh like: reggae-pop track "Woman Like Me." It explodes into a rock and roll dance break filled with pyro and intensive hairography, and spiky "Salute," twists into Lil Nas X's song "Industry Baby".

They added "It’s clear that Little Mix are joyfully taking control of their legacy. The set hinges on a transition from Between Us, a tribute to their endurance, and "Love (Sweet Love)," another new single that declares total independence. Their promise that Little Mix is forever (“2011 – always”) is teary and heartfelt. 2020 single "Sweet Melody," is the closer, and feels more like a triumphant beginning than an ending, and with the Newcastle's bars blaring it out as the crowd find their way home, and when Little Mix returns, there's going to be a party."

Jess Flaherty from Liverpool Echo who attended their sold out show at M&S Bank Arena, gave them a five star rating. They added "The talented trio dominated the stage with explosion of confetti, laughter, tears, impeccable dance moves and more. Their power and tenacity in the music industry isn't just down to their singing power and ability to release a hit single, it's also down to the fact the group is just likeable. Pop music isn't my favourite genre yet I've rooted for Little Mix's success for the last decade."

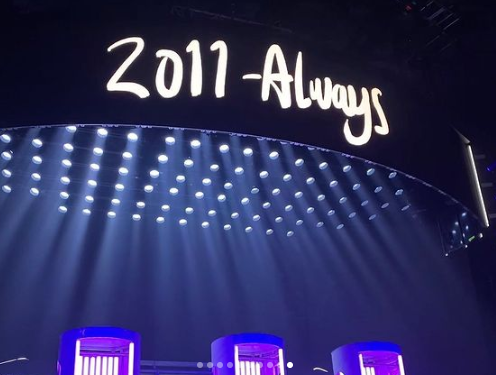
"2011–Always" sign flashed on the screen after the encore. It was used by the group as a trademark after they announced their hiatus.

They also added "Once their tour finishes in May, the British music industry will be incredibly different, with no major girl group to pick up their torch. This is why, despite the show's girly and camp fun, it became a bittersweet affair. The group kicked of the night off with an eruption of confetti before launching into "Shout Out to My Ex". Little Mix brought the audience along for the ride, encouraging singalongs to some of the track's most excellently acerbic lines. Between belting out hit after hit, each member got the chance to show off their incredible vocal range".

Audience members reportedly cried when the trio sang the ballad "Secret Love Song"; Thirlwall said: "We are so unbelievably grateful and we'd like to give a special shout out to our LGBTQ+ community." The singer became emotional when talking that they hope they have given a safe space to the community – sentiments echoed by the crowd who raised sheets of paper which read: "Thank you for being our safe space". As the show came to a close, Jade said: "Honestly, we're so, so grateful and we can't believe it's been over a decade of Little Mix and we've stood the test of time thanks to you." Proving that all good things must come to an end, the band bowed out with Sweet Melody, with the crowd united in joy and tears. They promise that Little Mix is forever and I, and thousands of others, will surely be counting down the days until they return.

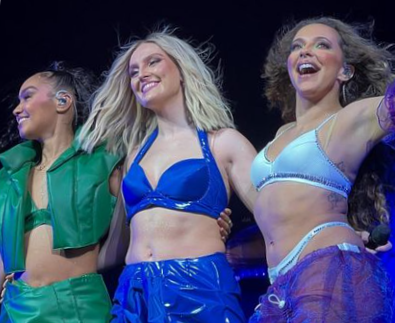
Little Mix performing at the Motorpoint Arena in Cardiff, Wales

Graham Clark from The Yorkshire Times commented "Following the announcement that the group would be taking a break, the concert at the Leeds Arena was destined to be a celebration of their past rather than a fond farewell. With the catalogue of hits they have there was never any doubt that the evening would be anything other than joyful and uplifting". He added: "As another small suspended stage slowly transported them over the audience the vocals on "No More Sad Songs" were heartfelt and touching. The final notes on the song always give me goosebumps and tonight was no exception. If this tour was to be their last performance for the time being then pop music has lost one of its best girl groups leading the gates wide open to fill what will be a huge and duller empty space".

Louise Griffin from the Metro gave their performance from The O_{2} Arena in London a five-star rating. They commented "There are infinite reasons why Little Mix have grown into one of the greatest girl groups the UK has seen. Among them are their stage presence and charisma, their intuitive ability to write a hit song, their continuation of the girl power legacy, their fierce loyalty and love for each other, and, most of all, their raw talent. Kicking off with classic bangers like 'Shout Out to My Ex' and 'Break Up Song,' the girls instantly brought the party, with out of this world vocals and choreography. They expertly switched up some of their hits, including an absolutely unforgettable rock version of 'Woman Like Me' and a glorious mash-up of 'Salute' and Lil Nas X's 'Industry Baby'." They continued with: "They're at the very top of their game, they each have the talent, charisma and confidence to take over the world and we have every faith they will. They'll likely go in totally different directions with their solo music, but they'll be there for each other every step of the way."

Alice Vincent from The Daily Telegraph, who attended one of their shows at The O_{2} Arena gave their performance a five out of five star rating. They added "Britain’s pop queens, bid farewell (for now) in a blaze of camp glory".

== Accolades ==
Following the first of their two shows at Glasgow's OVO Hydro Arena, Little Mix were commended and awarded a framed plaque to commemorate them becoming the band that has played the most dates and the group with the highest all-time ticket sales at the arena.

After their second show, the OVO Hydro Arena then announced that Little Mix also held the record for the "most tickets sold for a single all-seated show by a musical act" at the venue.

== Little Mix: The Last Show (For Now...) ==
On 26 April 2022, Little Mix announced they would live stream their final tour date at The O_{2} Arena, in London. The stream, titled Little Mix: The Last Show (For Now...), was also made available for a limited cinema release on 14 May 2022. Tickets were made available alongside merchandise on 27 April, with a portion of proceeds being donated to two charities: Child Poverty Action Group and Choose Love.

According to Music Week, the live show was watched in over 143 countries and sold over 100,000 tickets, 85,000 tickets were sold online and 29,000 tickets on worldwide cinemas. The show had grossed £361,908, during its release week and debuted at number five in the UK box office. On 24 August, 2022 it was announced that the tour had raised over 127,000 for the Nordoff–Robbins music therapy, organisation.

== Set list ==
This set list was posted by the Official Charts Company on 11 April 2022. It does not represent all shows from the tour.

1. "Shout Out to My Ex"
2. "Heartbreak Anthem"
3. "Break Up Song"
4. "Wings"
5. "Power" / "Gloves Up"
6. "Move”
7. "Secret Love Song, Pt II"
8. "Woman Like Me" (rock version; contains elements of "Free Your Mind" by En Vogue)
9. "Happiness"
10. "No More Sad Songs"
11. "Love Me or Leave Me"
12. "Between Us"
13. "Love (Sweet Love)"
14. "Reggaetón Lento (Remix)"
15. "Wasabi"
16. "Black Magic"
17. "Salute" (contains elements of "Industry Baby" by Lil Nas X)
18. "Touch"
19. "Only You"
20. "No Time for Tears"
21. "Confetti"

Encore

22. "Sweet Melody"

=== Alterations ===
- During the opening night in Belfast, "No" was performed between "Power/Gloves Up" and "Secret Love Song, Pt II" and was since cut out of the setlist.
- During the opening night in Belfast, "Move" was performed in between "Break Up Song" and "Wings". After opening night it was moved after "Power” / “Gloves Up”.
- During the tour's final date, "Show Me Love" was used to segue between "Only You" and "No Time for Tears".
- During the final show, following the encore, Little Mix returned to the stage to once again perform "Between Us". Their dancers joined them on stage for the performance.

== Tour dates ==
List of concerts (Note: The European leg was originally scheduled to take place from 28 April to 29 May 2021.)
Date (2022)	City	Country	Venue	Supporting acts
9 April	Belfast	Northern Ireland	SSE Arena	Denis Coleman (Note: Excluding matinée shows); Since September
10 April	Belfast	Northern Ireland	SSE Arena	Denis Coleman; Since September
12 April	Dublin	Ireland	3Arena	Denis Coleman; Since September
13 April	Dublin	Ireland	3Arena	Denis Coleman; Since September
15 April	Newcastle	England	Utilita Arena Newcastle	Denis Coleman; Since September
16 April (Note: This day has both matinée and evening shows.)	Newcastle	England	Utilita Arena Newcastle	Denis Coleman; Since September
18 April	Liverpool	England	M&S Bank Arena	Denis Coleman; Since September
19 April	Sheffield	England	Utilita Sheffield Arena	Denis Coleman; Since September
21 April	Birmingham	England	Resorts World Arena	Denis Coleman; Since September
22 April	Birmingham	England	Resorts World Arena	Denis Coleman; Since September
23 April	Birmingham	England	Resorts World Arena	Denis Coleman; Since September
26 April	Liverpool	England	M&S Bank Arena	Denis Coleman; Since September
27 April	Glasgow	Scotland	OVO Hydro	Denis Coleman; Since September
28 April	Glasgow	Scotland	OVO Hydro	Denis Coleman; Since September
30 April	Leeds	England	First Direct Arena	Denis Coleman; Since September
2 May	Cardiff	Wales	Motorpoint Arena Cardiff	Denis Coleman; Since September
3 May	Cardiff	Wales	Motorpoint Arena Cardiff	Denis Coleman; Since September
4 May	Cardiff	Wales	Motorpoint Arena Cardiff	Denis Coleman; Since September
6 May	Manchester	England	AO Arena	Denis Coleman; Since September
7 May	Manchester	England	AO Arena	Denis Coleman; Since September
9 May	Nottingham	England	Motorpoint Arena Nottingham	Denis Coleman; Since September
10 May	Nottingham	England	Motorpoint Arena Nottingham	Denis Coleman; Since September
12 May	London	England	The O_{2} Arena	Denis Coleman; Since September
13 May	London	England	The O_{2} Arena	Denis Coleman; Since September
14 May	London	England	The O_{2} Arena	Denis Coleman; Since September
