= Heartbreak Anthem =

2021 single by Galantis, David Guetta and Little Mix

Single by Galantis, David Guetta and Little Mix
- Released: 20 May 2021
- Recorded: 2020–21
- Genre: Dance-pop; EDM
- Length: 3:03
- Label: Atlantic
- Composers: Jenna Andrews; Thom Bridges; Henrik Jonback; Lorenzo Cosi; David Saint Fleur; Johnny Goldstein; David Guetta; Christian Karlsson; Yk Koi; Christopher Tempest
- Lyricists: Perrie Edwards; Sorana Păcurar; Leigh-Anne Pinnock; Jade Thirlwall
- Producers: Galantis; David Guetta; Thom Bridges (co.); Henrik Jonback (co.); Lorenzo Cosi (co.); David Saint Fleur (co.); Johnny Goldstein (co.)

Galantis singles chronology
"The Best" (2021)	"Heartbreak Anthem" (2021)	"Tears for Later" (2021)

David Guetta singles chronology
"Get Together" (2021)	"Heartbreak Anthem" (2021)	"Shine Your Light" (2021)

Little Mix singles chronology
"Confetti" (2021)	"Heartbreak Anthem" (2021)	"Kiss My (Uh-Oh)" (2021)

Music video
- "Heartbreak Anthem" on YouTube

"Heartbreak Anthem" is a song by Swedish electronic music duo Galantis, French DJ and music producer David Guetta and British girl group Little Mix. It was released on 20 May 2021 through Atlantic Records and appears on Little Mix's greatest hits album Between Us (2021) along with Galantis' fourth studio album Rx (2024). An EDM and pop song with dance-pop influences, it was co-written by Guetta, Galantis member Christian Karlsson, alongside Perrie Edwards, Leigh-Anne Pinnock, and Jade Thirlwall.

"Heartbreak Anthem" received positive reviews from music critics, with praise being drawn to its uplifting good vibe and group vocals. A commercial success, the song peaked at number one on Hungary's radio chart. On the UK Singles Chart, it peaked at number three becoming Galantis' highest-charting entry on the charts there. The song also reached the top ten in Ireland, Lebanon, and Poland, and charted in 20 other countries.

"Heartbreak Anthem" was nominated for "Best International Song" at the 42nd Brit Awards and "Dance Song of the Year" at 2022 iHeartRadio Music Awards. The group performed the song for the first time as a trio on Little Mix's The Confetti Tour (2022).

== Background and release ==
Galantis, David Guetta, and Little Mix began work on "Heartbreak Anthem" before the COVID-19 pandemic, and between London, Los Angeles and Stockholm. The song originally featured vocals from Jesy Nelson, but the vocal arrangement was later changed after her departure from Little Mix in December 2020.

On 14 May 2021, the song was teased by all three artists by posting a link to a website that displayed a 24-hour timer. On 14 May, after the timer finished "Heartbreak Anthem" was announced through all three artists' social media.

It started with just the chord progression at a studio in London right before the pandemic. As many collaborations have gone in these times, it was a remote work in progress for months, with stems sent back and forth from London to Los Angeles to Stockholm to Paris. We'd been talking with [David Guetta] about working together for a long time, and having Little Mix and their unique, strong vocals has made this one really special.

— Christian Karlsson, Rolling Stone

The song was later included on Little Mix's greatest hits album Between Us, which was released in November 2021 and Galantis' studio album Rx, released in May 2024.

== Composition and production ==
"Heartbreak Anthem" was written by Perrie Edwards, Leigh-Anne Pinnock, Jade Thirlwall, Jenna Andrews, Thom Bridges, Henrik Jonback, Lorenzo Cosi, David Saint Fleur, Johnny Goldstein, Yk Koi, Sorana Păcurar Christopher Tempest, alongside David Guetta, and Christian Karlsson, who produced the track. Lyrically "Heartbreak Anthem" addresses their respective exes after a breakup and wishing them the best post-split. It is a dance-pop and EDM song that runs for a total length of three minutes and three seconds.

== Critical reception ==
Upon release, "Heartbreak Anthem" got positive reviews. Writing for Vulture, Zoe Haylock wrote that "Heartbreak Anthem" is "far from a sad song, but something about listening to a dance track when there's actually a possibility of dancing soon is emotional". DJ Times' Brian Bonavoglia stated the collaboration as an "uplifting sing-a-long that is impossible not to fall in love with". Euphoria Magazine complemented the song as an "absolute dance-pop banger" and "free-spirited". Katie Bain from Billboard wrote that "the song's production is built from brightly plucky strings and synth, with the lyrics – in the grand tradition of Destiny's Child's "Survivor" – focused on being better than that: not holding grudges, understanding that while sometimes it works out, sometimes it doesn't, and that while maybe we'll fix this, it's also possible we won't. Whatever! Who cares!"

From Official Charts, Rob said "The whole thing eventually builds into a frothy and ridiculously bouncy affair laced with Galantis' signature string-flecked EDM flourishes and Guetta's dependable dance pop production." Attitude ranked the song as the group's best dance collaboration.

== Accolades ==
Year	Nominee / work	Award	Result	Ref.
2022	Brit Awards	Best International Song	Nominated	
2022	iHeartRadio Music Awards	Dance Song of the Year	Nominated	

== Chart performance ==
"Heartbreak Anthem" topped the Mediabase US dance radio, The Sky VIP Official Big Top 40, UK Dance Singles and Hungary's radio charts. In the United Kingdom the song debuted at number nine, becoming Galantis' fourth, Guetta's 24th and Little Mix's 17th top 10 single. For the week ending 4 June 2021, it reached a new peak of number eight and in the same week, the title track of Little Mix's sixth studio album, Confetti (2020), charted at number nine. This marked, the first time the group had two songs in the top ten on the UK Singles Chart since 2016, when the group's singles "Touch" and "Shout Out to My Ex" were at numbers four and six, respectively. It later reached a new peak of number three on the UK Singles Chart during its seventh week charting, becoming Galantis' highest-charting single there. That same week, the song was certified silver by the British Phonographic Industry (BPI) in the United Kingdom for selling 200,000 units in the country. In its tenth week on the UK Singles "Heartbreak Anthem" remained inside the top ten at number seven, making Little Mix the first girl group to spend a total of 100 weeks in the top ten of the UK Singles Chart.

It was ranked as the fourth-biggest song from June to August 2021 in the UK. According to The Official Charts, by the end of 2021 "Heartbreak Anthem" was ranked as the nineteenth best selling single of 2021 and the 27th most streamed song overall. It was also the seventh most played track of the year on UK radio.

In Ireland, the song debuted within the top 20 on the Official Irish Singles Chart, and became the Little Mix 22nd Top 20 single on the chart. It later reached a new peak of number three on the chart, giving Little Mix their 11th Top 10 single there. It also reached the top ten in New Zealand, Poland, Lebanon and on the Euro Digital Songs, and US Dance/Electronic Songs charts.

Elsewhere, "Heartbreak Anthem" reached the charts in 21 other music markets including Australia, where the song debuted at number 100 on the ARIA Singles Chart for the chart dated 31 May 2021. In its seventh week, it reached a new peak of number 46, becoming their highest-charting single there since "Woman Like Me" in 2018.

== Music video ==
The music video was filmed at in East End's historic Wilton's Music Hall, during Perrie Edwards and Leigh-Anne Pinnock's pregnancies. Little Mix teased the music video for "Heartbreak Anthem" by posting behind-the-scene photos from the video. It was directed by Samuel Douek, and premiered on 20 May 2021. The music video features Little Mix members in theatre production, and opens up with the group dressed as winged angels, each having a microphone accompanying them.

Samuel Douek in an Instagram post said "The concept of the video is inspired by Angela Carter's infamous 1984 novel Nights at the Circus, a magical realism feminist tale about freedom". He further added that the group portrayed "The Winged Fatales", an all singing, all dancing trio who perform night after night to adoring crowds, whilst backstage they feel trapped and alone. The video features digital images of David Guetta and the Galantis. Douek stated that "The video touches upon the pressures of fame and heartbreak, evoking a message of self-acceptance against the backdrop of a sci-fi burlesque world". It also took inspiration from the 1997 film The Fifth Element and Baz Luhrman's 2001 musical Moulin Rouge. From ThatGrapeJuice, Sam Ajilore applauded the music video and stating the song is "rich in summer smash potential".

== Track listing ==
Digital download
No.	Title	Length
1.	"Heartbreak Anthem"	3:03
Total length:		3:03

Digital download – Remixes
No.	Title	Length
1.	"Heartbreak Anthem" (Misha K & Galantis Gold Rush VIP)	2:52
2.	"Heartbreak Anthem" (Tchami Remix)	3:48
3.	"Heartbreak Anthem" (Guz Remix)	5:05
4.	"Heartbreak Anthem" (East & Young Remix)	3:23
5.	"Heartbreak Anthem" (The Avener Remix)	5:36
6.	"Heartbreak Anthem" (Clean Bandit Remix)	3:12
7.	"Heartbreak Anthem" (Antoine Delvig Remix)	3:28
8.	"Heartbreak Anthem" (DJ Press Play Remix)	2:56
9.	"Heartbreak Anthem" (Frank Walker Remix)	4:04
10.	"Heartbreak Anthem"	3:03
Total length:		37:27

Digital download – (Tchami Remix)
No.	Title	Length
1.	"Heartbreak Anthem" (Tchami Remix)	3:48
Total length:		3:48

Digital download – (Clean Bandit Remix)
No.	Title	Length
1.	"Heartbreak Anthem" (Clean Bandit Remix)	3:27
Total length:		3:27

== Personnel ==
Credits are adapted from Tidal.

- Galantis – production, backing vocals
- Christian Karlsson – mixing
- David Guetta – production, backing vocals
- Little Mix – vocals
- David "Saint" Fleur – co-production, mixing, programming, keyboards
- Henrik Jonback – co-production
- Johnny Goldstein – co-production
- Thom Bridges – co-production
- Mike Hawkins – co-production
- Sondr – co-production
- Toby Green – co-production
- Randy Merrill – mastering
- Serban Ghenea – mixing
- Raphaella – recording, vocal production

== Charts ==
=== Weekly charts ===
Weekly chart performance for "Heartbreak Anthem"
Chart (2021–2022)	Peak position
Australia (ARIA)	46
Austria (Ö3 Austria Top 40)	53
Belgium (Ultratop 50 Flanders)	30
Canada Hot 100 (Billboard)	86
Croatia (HRT)	16
Czech Republic Singles Digital (ČNS IFPI)	30
Euro Digital Songs (Billboard)	4
Germany (GfK)	57
Global 200 (Billboard)	52
Greece (IFPI)	61
Hungary (Dance Top 40)	22
Hungary (Rádiós Top 40)	1
Hungary (Single Top 40)	11
Hungary (Stream Top 40)	40
Iceland (Tónlistinn)	39
Ireland (IRMA)	5
Japan Hot Overseas (Billboard Japan)	18
Lebanon (OLT20)	7
Lithuania (AGATA)	47
Mexico Airplay (Billboard)	41
Netherlands (Dutch Top 40)	13
Netherlands (Single Top 100)	23
New Zealand Hot Singles (RMNZ)	9
Norway (VG-lista)	23
Poland Airplay (ZPAV)	10
Portugal (AFP)	114
Romania (Airplay 100)	99
Slovakia Airplay (ČNS IFPI)	81
Slovakia Singles Digital (ČNS IFPI)	38
Sweden (Sverigetopplistan)	36
Switzerland (Schweizer Hitparade)	51
UK Singles (Official Charts)	3
UK Dance (Official Charts)	1
US Dance/Mix Show Airplay (Billboard)	1
US Hot Dance/Electronic Songs (Billboard)	6
Venezuela (Record Report)	49

=== Year-end charts ===
2021 year-end chart performance for "Heartbreak Anthem"
Chart (2021)	Position
Biggest Summer Songs of 2021 (Official Charts)	4
Hungary (Rádiós Top 40)	22
Ireland (IRMA)	29
Netherlands (Dutch Top 40)	66
Netherlands (Single Top 100)	87
Poland (Polish Airplay Top 100)	64
UK Singles (OCC)	24
US Hot Dance/Electronic Songs (Billboard)	13

2022 year-end chart performance for "Heartbreak Anthem"
Chart (2022)	Position
Hungary (Dance Top 40)	89

== Certifications ==
Certifications for "Heartbreak Anthem"
Region	Certification	Certified units/sales
United Kingdom (BPI)	2× Platinum	1,200,000^{‡}
Canada (Music Canada)	Platinum	80,000^{‡}
United States (RIAA)	Gold	500,000^{‡}
Austria (IFPI Austria)	Gold	15,000^{‡}
Denmark (IFPI Danmark)	Gold	45,000^{‡}
Italy (FIMI)	Gold	50,000^{‡}
Portugal (AFP)	Gold	5,000^{‡}
Spain (Promusicae)	Gold	30,000^{‡}
Poland (ZPAV)	Platinum	50,000^{‡}
New Zealand (RMNZ)	Platinum	30,000^{‡}
^{‡} Sales+streaming figures based on certification alone.

== Release history ==
Release dates and formats for "Heartbreak Anthem"
Region	Date	Format	Version	Label	Ref.
Various	20 May 2021	Digital download; streaming	Original	Atlantic	
Various	15 July 2021	Digital download; streaming	Tchami Remix	Atlantic	
Various	6 August 2021	Digital download; streaming	Clean Bandit Remix	Atlantic	
Various	3 September 2021	Digital download; streaming	Remix EP	Atlantic	

== See also ==
- List of UK top-ten singles in 2021
- List of top 10 singles in 2021 (Ireland)
- List of Billboard number-one dance songs of 2021
- List of UK Dance Singles Chart number ones of 2021
