= Confetti (Little Mix song) =

2020 song by Little Mix

Promotional single by Little Mix

from the album Confetti
- Released: 4 November 2020
- Recorded: 2020
- Studio: State of the Ark, London, UK
- Length: 2:47
- Label: RCA
- Songwriters: Ben Kohn; Camille Purcell; Maegan Cottone; Pete Kelleher; Tom Barnes; Uzoechi Emenike
- Producer: TMS

"Confetti"
- Cover for the single release, a remix featuring Saweetie

Single by Little Mix featuring Saweetie

from the album Confetti
- Released: 30 April 2021
- Recorded: 2020–2021
- Genre: Pop; R&B; hip hop; pop rap
- Length: 3:05
- Label: RCA
- Songwriters: Kohn; Purcell; Cottone; Kelleher; Barnes; Emenike; Diamonté Harper
- Producer: TMS

Little Mix singles chronology
"No Time for Tears" (2020)	"Confetti" (2021)	"Heartbreak Anthem" (2021)

Saweetie singles chronology
"Slow Clap" (2021)	"Confetti" (2021)	"Fast (Motion)" (2021)

Music video
- "Confetti" on YouTube

"Confetti" is a song by British girl group Little Mix. It was released through RCA UK on 4 November 2020, as the third promotional single from their sixth studio album of the same name. The song was written by MNEK, Kamille, Maegan Cottone and TMS, and was produced by the latter. "Confetti" is a pop song with elements of R&B, pop rap and hip hop, which sees the group celebrating independence after a break-up and their individual enjoyment of life.

A partially re-recorded remix of the track featuring American rapper Saweetie was released on 30 April 2021, as the fourth and final single from the album. It was Little Mix's first single release as a trio, with the removal of former member Jesy Nelson's vocals after her departure from the group in December 2020. A music video for the remix was released on the same day as the song's release, and features UK drag queens Bimini, Tayce and A'Whora. In 2022, it was cited as a Gay anthem.

"Confetti" received generally positive reviews from music critics, with many praising its feel-good vibe and self-sufficient lyrics. The remix was described as an "explosive return" as this was their first release of 2021 and as a trio. The album version peaked within the top 40 of the UK Official Singles Chart at number 23, while the remix reached a new peak of number 9. The song also reached the top 10 in Hungary. The song was later certified platinum in the country by the British Phonographic Industry (BPI) and certified gold in Brazil. The song won "Best Music Video" at the 2021 Music Daily Awards Hungary.

== Background ==
The solo version of the song was released on 4 November 2020, two days before the parent album dropped on 6 November 2020. The remix version of "Confetti" features American rapper Saweetie. Little Mix announced the remix on 22 April 2021 through their social media by posting an accompanying video announcement. The remix was released on 30 April 2021 and served as the fourth and final single from their sixth studio album of the same name. The remix version of the song does not include former member Jesy Nelson's vocals, as this marked the group's first release after her departure from the group in 2020, with her vocal parts being re-recorded by the other members. The remix was also included as a bonus track on the Record Store Day vinyl editions of the album, which was released on 12 June 2021.

In an interview with Euphoria Magazine, member Perrie Edwards shared her thoughts about the song saying, "We love the song 'Confetti', it's always been one of our favorites and we know from socials that the fans love it too!" Jade Thirlwall added, "It felt right to do an updated version of the song and give it a moment!" Talking about the music video, Leigh-Anne Pinnock said, "We really feel it might be one of our best videos ever. We're really excited for everyone to see it." As their first single release as a trio without Nelson, Thirlwall stated "It's just learning to adapt. I think it's quite exciting. And we got off to a good start as a three by having our No. 1 single in the UK. That was like, 'Oh wow, this is a good sign, good omen, that this year is going to be good for us.'" To promote the song, the group also appeared on the cover of Euphoria Magazine, a day before the song was released. Little Mix released a "Confetti" themed filter on Instagram as well to further promote the single.

== Composition and lyrics ==
"Confetti"
A 28-second sample of "Confetti" featuring Pinnock singing the second pre-chorus and all three for the chorus including adlibs.

"Confetti" is a pop song written by Tom Barnes, Pete Kelleher, Ben Kohn, Camille Purcell, Uzoechi Emenike, Maegan Cottone, with Saweetie writing her verse on the remix version. The song was produced solely by TMS. It runs for a total length of three minutes and five seconds. According to the sheet music published at Musicnotes.com by BMG Rights Management, the song is written in the key of A minor.

Lyrically, the song contains self-sufficient lyrics and talks about being strong and celebrating independence after a break-up. The song also promotes a focus on one's individual enjoyment of life, a lack of preoccupation with men and relationships, and an appreciation for what one has right here and now. Musically, the song is reminiscent of a compilation of early 2000s hits, and encapsulates the feel-good tone of the album as a whole.

In an interview with Nylon, Pinnock stated that the song is also about "female empowerment". She added "I think that's what we do best. So we absolutely love having females on our tracks". Pinnock went on to describe Saweetie's feature on the remix as "perfect" and added "She's definitely someone that we feel like embodies that [female empowerment].”

== Critical reception ==
As "Confetti" was the group's first single as a trio, Robin Murray of Clash described the song as an "explosive return" and called it a "potential summer anthem". He also described the song as "an all-out banger that stays lodged in your mind for hours after the first play". Sam Etzioni from Renowned for Sound says that the song "encapsulates the feel-good tone of the album as a whole" and stated "Its clubby vibe and self-sufficient lyrics make its title a simple-yet-effective name for a work which promotes a focus on one's individual enjoyment of life". Writing for Nylon, Lauren Mccarthy described the song as "fun, free, and a celebration of girl power" and added "The song itself is a feel-good banger of a pop anthem". DIY Magazine describes the song as "pure early-'00s compilation bangers, the sort that demand big-budget music videos.

Billboard described the song as "pop-meets-hip-hop remix that sees Saweetie drop a fresh verse. On it, she lets fly with some spicy rhymes". Joe of Attitude magazine wrote "Confetti was a standout on its parent album. The added production and adlibs on the single mix made it slicker, cooler and more memorable, making it an instant hit and one of many future classics for Little Mix."

== Music video ==
=== Concept ===
The music video for "Confetti", directed by Samuel Douek, was filmed over two days at the FOLD nightclub in London, England on 30 and 31 March 2021 and released alongside the remix on 30 April 2021. The video shows the members of Little Mix having a showdown with themselves as male doppelgängers; Pez (Perrie), Lenny (Leigh-Anne), and J-Dog (Jade). Saweetie appears in the video, delivering her verse from a street outside the club while wearing a leopard print outfit. The video features cameos from A'Whora, Tayce and Bimini Bon-Boulash, three drag queens from RuPaul's Drag Race UK. The video was choreographed by King O'Holi and Than Jason Nguyen, whom also choreographed the music video for the group's previous single "Sweet Melody".

The concept of the music video is something the group wanted to happen for a long time. In an interview with Nylon, Thirlwall said "We've reached this point where we're like, 'Yeah, let's do anything that we haven't quite been able to execute before, or haven't ticked off our list yet of things we want to achieve as a band.'"

During the video shoot, Edwards and Pinnock did not want to prematurely announce their respective pregnancies, so when they both experienced exhaustion, backaches and injuries from the strenuous dance routines during rehearsals, Thirlwall faked the same symptoms at the same time in order to deflect suspicion from the dancers, choreographers and director and not tarnish the group's hard-working image.

=== Synopsis ===
The video opens with people dancing in a nightclub, later turning their heads to Little Mix as they enter. During the first verse, the group is sat on chairs while snapping and pumping to the beat of the song. During the pre-chorus, the group dance their way to meet their male alter-egos, then having a dance battle against each other during the first chorus. The next scene, Jade is seen dancing to her verse with a guy, while Pez (Perrie's male counterpart) delivers his verse at the stairs with back-up dancers. Leigh-Anne then sings the second pre-chorus while doing floor choreography. During the second chorus, the dance battle between the group's male counterparts continues.

The music cuts off when Pez trips over and causes Tayce and A'Whora to spill their drinks, with Tayce repeating her catchphrase: "The cheek, the nerve, the gall, the audacity and the gumption." Bimini Bon-Boulash then steps in to clean up the mess made by the clueless trio of "braggadocious" dudes. The male counterparts awkwardly stand at a urinal together and make small talk about which members of Little Mix they would hook up with. Little Mix then gossip on the other side about which men are doing it for them. The music resumes after, with Tayce and A'Whora entering a CCTV room witnessing Saweetie in the monitors. Saweetie then delivers her verse while standing outside the club looking at the cameras and wearing a leopard-print bra top and a matching skirt. The video then zooms to the monitors where Little Mix is now on, dancing at a rooftop. The video ends with cash raining in the club as to the lyric "make it rain". Credits and bloopers then appear at the end of the video.

=== Reception ===
The video received praise for its queer-positive concept in which the group performed in drag along with other UK drag queens. However, shortly after the music video was released, the group received backlash for not inviting drag kings to star in the video. Speaking to Pop Buzz, multiple drag kings went on to express their disappointment for not being invited to take part in the video, "When I watched it, I was so excited to see people that I love and admire just thriving in their glory. But then I saw Little Mix as kings, these cis, heterosexual women, something in me just broke a bit. I know that they have never interacted or showed any interest in the drag king community. It was such a missed opportunity." drag king Chiyo stated. In an interview with Metro, member Jade Thirlwall went on to address the backlash to their music video and apologised for it.

"I don't think there's such a thing as a perfect ally. I'm still very much learning. Even recently, after our 'Confetti' music video I was confronted with the fact that, although we made sure our video was incredibly inclusive, we hadn't brought in any actual drag kings. Some were frustrated, and they had every right to be. You can have the right intentions and still fall short. As an open ally, I should have thought about that, and I hadn't, and for that, I apologise... But the point is we mess up, we apologise, we learn from it and we move forward with that knowledge."

— Jade Thirlwall addressing the backlash they received from the "Confetti" music video.

== Live performances ==
On 14 May 2021, the group gave the song its debut performance on a live acoustic version of "Confetti" on a YouTube livestream, after being featured on an episode of YouTube's Released. On May 20, 2021, the song was sung during a TikTok livestream after they did a live fan Q&A. The group performed the song during The Confetti Tour in 2022.

== Commercial performance ==
The solo version of "Confetti" was originally released as the third promotional single from the group's sixth studio album of the same name Confetti (2020) and charted at number 23 on the UK Singles Chart. The song reached the top 20 in Ireland and New Zealand, and charted in Hungary, Portugal, and Scotland.

The remix version of "Confetti" featuring American rapper Saweetie, debuted at number one on the Official Big Top 40 on 2 May 2021. The song later reached a new peak of number nine on the Official UK Singles Charts, becoming Little Mix's 18th UK Top 10 single in the country. It marked the first time since the group had two songs in the top ten since Touch and Shout Out to My Ex, reached the top 10 in January 2017. It has since been certified platinum by the British Phonographic Industry (BPI).

The remix also reached the top ten of the Euro Digital Charts, US Digital Songs Charts and entered the Billboard Global 200. It also charted in Belgium, New Zealand and Venezuela, and has since been certified gold by the Pro-Música Brasil (PMB).

=== Year-end lists ===
Confetti Remix on year-end lists
Critic/Publication	List	Rank	Ref.
Official Charts	Biggest Summer Songs of 2021	—N/a	

== Track listing ==
Digital download and streaming

1. "Confetti" – 2:47

Digital download and streaming – featuring Saweetie

1. "Confetti" (featuring Saweetie) – 3:05

Digital download and streaming – featuring Saweetie, Billen Ted remix

1. "Confetti" (featuring Saweetie, Billen Ted remix) – 3:01

Digital download and streaming – featuring Saweetie, Blinkie remix

1. "Confetti" (featuring Saweetie, Blinkie remix) – 3:51

Digital download and streaming – acoustic version

1. "Confetti" (acoustic) – 3:13

== Credits and personnel ==
Credits adapted from Tidal.

- Little Mix – vocals
- Saweetie – vocals, songwriting (remix only)
- TMS – production
  - Ben Kohn – songwriting, guitar, programming
  - Peter Kelleher – songwriting, keyboards, synths
- Tom Barnes – songwriting, bass, drums
- Camille Purcell – songwriting
- MNEK - songwriting, vocal production
- Maegan Cottone – songwriting, vocal production
- Randy Merrill – mastering
- Bill Zimmerman – engineering
- Phil Tan – mixing
- Chris Bishop – additional production
- Sam Klempner – additional production
- Raphaella – additional production

== Charts ==
=== Weekly charts ===
==== Solo version ====
Weekly chart performance for the solo version of "Confetti"
Chart (2020–2021)	Peak position
Hungary (Single Top 40)	10
Ireland (IRMA)	17
New Zealand Hot Singles (RMNZ)	12
Portugal (AFP)	126
Scottish Singles Sales (Official Charts)	95
UK Singles (Official Charts)	9

==== Remix version ====
Weekly chart performance for the Saweetie remix of "Confetti"
Chart (2021)	Peak position
Belgium (Ultratip Bubbling Under Flanders)	34
Euro Digital Songs (Billboard)	4
Global 200 (Billboard)	125
New Zealand Hot Singles (RMNZ)	15
US Digital Song Sales (Billboard)	48
Venezuela (Record Report)	70

=== Year-end charts ===
Chart (2021)	Position
UK Singles (OCC)	92

== Certifications ==
Certifications for "Confetti"
Region	Certification	Certified units/sales
United Kingdom (BPI)	Platinum	600,000^{‡}
Brazil (Pro-Música Brasil)	Gold	20,000^{‡}
^{‡} Sales+streaming figures based on certification alone.

== Release history ==
Release dates and formats for "Confetti"
Region	Date	Version	Format(s)	Label	Ref.
Various	4 November 2020	Album version	Digital download; streaming	RCA UK	
Various	30 April 2021	Saweetie version	Digital download; streaming	RCA UK	
Various	14 May 2021	Saweetie version, Billen Ted remix	Digital download; streaming	RCA UK	
Various	28 May 2021	Saweetie version, Blinkie remix	Digital download; streaming	RCA UK	
Various	28 May 2021	Acoustic version	Digital download; streaming	RCA UK	

== See also ==
- List of UK top-ten singles in 2021
- List of UK Singles Downloads Chart number ones of the 2020s
