= One I've Been Missing =

2019 single by Little Mix

Single by Little Mix
- Released: 22 November 2019
- Genre: Christmas
- Length: 3:12
- Label: RCA
- Songwriters: Jez Ashurst; Leigh-Anne Pinnock; Rachel Furner; Sinéad Harnett; Tre Jean-Marie
- Producers: Jez Ashurst; Jean-Marie

Little Mix singles chronology
"Bounce Back" (2019)	"One I've Been Missing" (2019)	"Break Up Song" (2020)

Music video
- "One I've Been Missing" on YouTube

"One I've Been Missing" is a song by British girl group Little Mix. It was released on November 22, 2019 by RCA Records, as the group's first official Christmas single and later became a contender for the UK Christmas number-one single. It was co-written by Little Mix member Leigh-Anne Pinnock alongside Jez Ashurst, Rachel Furner, Sinéad Harnett, and Tre Jean-Marie.

One I've been missing has been described as a 1950s inspired Ballad with a beautiful ode to festive love, with luscious harmonies. The song reached number four on the Belgium (Ultratip Flanders) charts and at number fourteen in Sweden. It charted within the top twenty on the Euro Digital Song and New Zealand Hot Singles charts. It reached number fifty nine on the UK Singles Chart, and charted in Ireland, Scotland, and on the US Holiday Digital Songs Charts. It was later added onto the expanded edition of their sixth studio album, Confetti as a bonus track.

== Background ==
Although the song is the first Christmas-themed song by the group, they did release a "Christmas mix" of their 2015 single "Love Me Like You" and have performed covers of Christmas songs, like "Christmas (Baby Please Come Home)".

== Promotion ==
Little Mix announced the song in a video posted to social media on 19 November 2019.

== Track listing ==
Digital download and streaming

1. "One I've Been Missing" – 3:12

Digital download and streaming – acoustic

1. "One I've Been Missing" (acoustic) – 3:02

Streaming – One I've Been Missing – EP

1. "One I've Been Missing" – 3:12
2. "One I've Been Missing" (acoustic) – 3:02

== Charts ==
Chart (2019–2020)	Peak position
Belgium (Ultratip Bubbling Under Flanders)	4
Euro Digital Songs (Billboard)	18
Ireland (IRMA)	72
New Zealand Hot Singles (RMNZ)	26
Scotland Singles (OCC)	23
Sweden Heatseeker (Sverigetopplistan)	14
UK Singles (OCC)	59
US Holiday Digital Songs (Billboard)	29

== Release history ==
Release dates and formats for "One I've Been Missing"
Region	Date	Format(s)	Version	Label	Ref.
Various	22 November 2019	Digital download; streaming	Original	RCA UK	
Various	22 November 2019	Streaming	Remix EP	RCA UK	
Various	13 December 2019	Digital download; streaming	Acoustic	RCA UK	
