= Confetti (Little Mix album) =

Studio album by Little Mix
- Released: 6 November 2020
- Recorded: 2019–2020
- Studios: London, UK (Metropolis, State of the Ark, Sarm); Edgewater, New Jersey (Sterling Sound)
- Genres: Pop; R&B
- Length: 40:26
- Labels: RCA; Columbia
- Producers: Oliver Frid; Goldfingers; Invisible Men; Kamille; Chris Loco; Lostboy; Cass Lowe; MNEK; Alex Nice; Oak; Tayla Parx; Peoples; Rissi; Keith Sorrells; TMS

Little Mix chronology
LM5 (2018)	Confetti (2020)	Between Us (2021)

Singles from Confetti
- 1. "Break Up Song" Released: 27 March 2020; 2. "Holiday" Released: 24 July 2020; 3. "Sweet Melody" Released: 23 October 2020; 4. "Confetti" Released: 30 April 2021

Confetti is the sixth studio album by British girl group Little Mix, released on 6 November 2020 by RCA and Columbia Records. It was largely recorded before the COVID-19 pandemic, which interfered with the promotion plan for the album. Jesy Nelson announced her departure from the group in December 2020, a month after the album's release. Confetti is their first to be released under RCA Records, following their departure from Syco Music. Confetti is a pop and R&B record that lyrically addresses themes of self-acceptance, self-worth, freedom, and independence.

Upon release, it received generally positive reviews from critics, becoming the group's highest rated album to date on Metacritic. Critics described it as a solid pop album and praised its production. It spawned four singles; "Break Up Song", the album's lead single peaked at number nine on the UK Singles Chart, while the second single "Holiday" reached number fifteen. "Sweet Melody" was released as the album's third single and became their fifth number one in the UK. A remix of the title track, featuring American rapper Saweetie, was released as the final single, reaching number nine on the UK Charts.

Confetti is the group's most successful album in terms of top ten charts placements globally. It debuted at number two on the UK Albums Chart, becoming the fastest-selling album of 2020 by a British act. It topped the Irish Albums Chart, and reached the top ten in various countries. To promote the album, Little Mix embarked on The Confetti Tour in 2022, which visited the UK and Ireland. The tour was commercially successful, grossing over $6 million within six shows and received positive critical acclaim from critics.

== Background ==
On 12 March 2020, Little Mix released a music video for the LM5 (2018) album track "Wasabi". At the end of the video, the album cover for LM5 was seen standing on a platform before being thrown out by an explosion of confetti, followed by the message 'New Era Pending'.

On 16 September 2020, Confetti was announced across multiple social media platforms by Little Mix, revealing the release date of 6 November 2020, as well as the album art and the title. On 18 September, streaming services released pre-orders of the album. The standard edition has 13 tracks. On 27 October, Little Mix partnered with Amazon Alexa to release the official track listing. Fans were encouraged to say "Alexa, drop some Confetti" and they would receive a track name. The next day, 28 October, the full track listing was confirmed.

The album was "pretty much finished" before the COVID-19 lockdowns were implemented, with "little tweaks" still to be made. As restrictions eased, each of the members individually visited the studios to add "final touches", whereas for their previous albums, they would complete the album process together. Perrie Edwards noted that it was a "weird process", but that they felt they had to complete it due to wanting "everyone to hear it". Jesy Nelson noted the contrast between Confetti and LM5, stating that LM5 was very "girl power", whereas with Confetti, she said: "With this album, we just had fun and wrote songs that we liked and it came together". Jade Thirlwall agreed with Nelson, adding, "Not every single song has to have this super deep meaning. People know what we're about now and know what we stand for. I think LM5 was very much about solidifying that, whereas with this album it is just about writing brilliant pop songs that we love." Confetti was described by Leigh-Anne Pinnock as the group's "biggest" album yet. Around the album's release, Nelson took some time out of the group's promotion schedule, citing a private medical matter. On 14 December, Nelson announced she was leaving the group due to the impact on her mental health. In a statement, she said, "I find the constant pressure of being in a girl group and living up to expectations very hard."

On 12 June 2021, a new vinyl version of the album was made available in selected stores around the world for Record Store Day 2021. The new version came in an orange and pink cover with the album title printed in cursive silver glitter. The new version exclusively featured the new remix version of the album's title track, "Confetti", featuring American rapper Saweetie.

On 13 July 2022, a limited vinyl edition in partner-ship with UNICEF UK, Blue Vinyl series was released.

== Music and lyrics ==
Musically, Confetti is a pop and R&B record, incorporating elements of synth-pop, gospel, retro and contemporary pop production that "provides its audience with a warm and fuzzy feeling of nostalgic delight". The album was also described as reminiscent of the group's previous bubblegum-pop records, but with a more mature sound and "poignant lyrics". Lyrically, the songs discuss being freed from unrealistic expectations, self-acceptance, self-worth and a "fierce and mercifully coherent statement of independence".

=== Songs ===
Confetti opens with "Break Up Song", a 1980s synth-pop "kiss-off anthem" about joy and liberation that one can find in single life. It has been compared to Don Henley's "The Boys of Summer". Sam Etzioni of Renowned for Sound believes that the song serves as a sequel to the group's Glory Days track "Shout Out to My Ex". The second track, "Holiday", has a "post-Daft Punk" feel and is set to house beats. The third track, "Sweet Melody", has reggaeton beats, and lyrically is about getting over an ex-boyfriend. The title track, which serves as the fourth track of the album, is reminiscent of a compilation of early 2000s hits, and encapsulates the feel-good tone of the album as a whole. The song contains self-sufficient lyrics and promotes a focus on one's individual enjoyment of life, a lack of preoccupation with men and relationships and an appreciation for what one has right here and now.

"Happiness", the fifth track, is a Europop-R&B song. Lyrically, the song is about finding strength from within, rather than needing a partner to draw that strength and happiness from. The lyrics are reminiscent to the group's LM5 track "The Cure" for its message regarding self-love and acceptance. The sixth track, "Not A Pop Song", is a guitar-lead track, containing lyrics about battling unrealistic expectations and superficial standards in the pop world. The song also appears to take a swipe at Simon Cowell and his record label, Syco Music, which the group left back in 2018, with the lyrics "I don't do what Simon says". The song is also described as "the perfect ode to the stereotypical pop music factory". The seventh track, "Nothing But My Feelings", is lyrically about a "booty call". Member Jade Thirlwall said that they "[the writers] purposefully made the song seem quite innocent, but really when you look into the lyrics they're pretty filthy".

The eighth track, "Gloves Up", has a euphoric and deep groove with clattering rhythm that is reminiscent of 2000s R&B. The ninth track, "A Mess (Happy 4 U)", is a melodic pop song, shifting after two minutes into a dark cloud of sampled panting, booming drums and distorted vocals. "My Love Won't Let You Down", which serves as the tenth track of the album, is a gospel piano ballad. The song talks about the "human nature of friendship", and it is believed to be written as a love letter for the fans. Jacklyn Krol of PopCrush described the song as a "soaring ballad" and that it "shows off the group’s raw vocal talent without getting bogged down by glossy production". The eleventh track, "Rendezvous", is a contemporary pop song with hints of retro, and has been compared to the work of the Pussycat Dolls, particularly their song "Buttons". The song samples "Sway" by Dean Martin.

"If You Want My Love", the twelfth track, is a R&B song, and has drawn comparisons to TLC and Destiny's Child. The closing track, "Breathe", is a torch song and lyrically about heartbreak. "Bounce Back" appears on the Japanese deluxe version of Confetti, and is a trap-pop song that interpolates "Back to Life (However Do You Want Me)" by Soul II Soul.

== Artwork ==
The standard cover of the Confetti album depicts Nelson, Pinnock, Thirlwall, and Edwards, each wearing glittery makeup with fluorescent lights flying across the background. The name of the group can be seen at the top of the cover printed in off-white color, and the album name at the bottom. Pinnock can also be observed wearing her engagement ring in the cover artwork, after she was engaged to her fiancé Andre Gray in May 2020. The back cover also has fluorescent lights in the background, similar to the front, and displays the track list of the album. The expanded edition of the album features the same cover but with the name of the band printed in blue color. The exclusive vinyl version of the album for Record Store Day 2021 came with an orange and pink cover with the album title printed in cursive silver glitter.

== Promotion ==
=== Singles ===
Confetti was supported by four singles. On 27 March 2020, "Break Up Song" was released as the lead single from the then-untitled album. The official music video was released on 8 May 2020. The song debuted at number nine on the UK Singles Chart, and spent 18 weeks on the chart. The song charted in several other countries and received gold music certifications from the British Phonographic Industry (BPI) and from Pro-Música Brasil (PMB).

"Holiday" was released on 24 July 2020 and served as the album's second single. Its music video was filmed during isolation due to the COVID-19 pandemic, in front of a greenscreen, and features the group as mermaids and goddesses. It was released on 28 August 2020. The track peaked at number fifteen on the UK Singles Chart, and charted in ten other territories. It has since been certified gold in both the United Kingdom and Brazil.

"Sweet Melody" was announced as the album's third single on 19 October, and released on 23 October. An accompanying music video was released the same day as the song's release. The song debuted at number eight on the UK Singles Chart, and peaked at number one three months after its release, becoming the group's fifth chart-topper in the United Kingdom. The song spent thirteen weeks inside the top 10 of the UK Charts, becoming the group's longest running Top 10 single there.

A remix of the album's title track, featuring American rapper Saweetie, was released as the fourth and final single of the album on 30 April, as announced on 21 April. The reworked version does not feature the verse by former member Nelson, as it was the group's first release as a trio, following her departure in 2020. An accompanying music video, directed by Samuel Douek, was released the same day. The song peaked at number nine on the UK Singles Chart and has been certified silver by the BPI. The remix also charted in Belgium, New Zealand and Venezuela.

==== Promotional singles ====
Prior to the album's release, three promotional singles were released, all of which had accompanying lyric videos on the group's YouTube channel. On 9 October 2020, "Not a Pop Song" was released as the album's first promotional single. On 16 October 2020, "Happiness" was released as the second promotional single. On 4 November 2020, the title track was released as the third promotional single, before being released as the album's fourth official single.

=== Live performances ===
Promotion for Confetti and its singles was limited because of the COVID-19 pandemic. On August 21, 2020, the group first performed "Break Up Song" and "Holiday" for their virtual concert Little Mix - UNCancelled. It was watched by over 300,000 fans and presented by Meerkat Music. They went on to perform an acoustic version of "Holiday" on BBC Radio 1's Live Lounge on September 15.

The group later promoted the album and its singles on Little Mix: The Search. The debut performance of "Sweet Melody" took place on the first live show of Little Mix: The Search. Group member Jade Thirlwall was absent on the day of the performance as she was self-isolating as a precaution at the time. Two weeks later, they performed a mashup of "Holiday" and "Touch" on the semi-finals of the same show. It ended up being the last performance that featured all four members, before it was announced that Jesy Nelson would be taking an extended break from the group.

On November 8, the group hosted the 2020 MTV EMAs as a trio, where they performed their single "Sweet Melody". Little Mix continued to promote the album with an appearance and a performance of "Sweet Melody" on The Jonathan Ross Show on 21 November 2020. They later performed "Break Up Song" on the semi-finals of BBC's Strictly Come Dancing on 13 December 2020.

=== The Confetti Tour ===
On 17 September 2020, Little Mix announced their seventh tour, The Confetti Tour, originally scheduled to take place from 28 April to 29 May 2021, before being postponed to April and May 2022 due to the UK's coronavirus restrictions as well as Edwards' and Pinnock's respective pregnancies. The tour locations were also announced, with the group scheduled to perform in cities across the UK and Ireland. Tickets were released to the general public on 25 September at 9am BST, with the option of pre-sale tickets given to those who pre-ordered Confetti through the group's official website. The pre-sale tickets were available from 22 to 25 September.

== Critical reception ==
Professional ratings
Aggregate scores
Source	Rating
AnyDecentMusic?	7.1/10
Metacritic	74/100
Review scores
Source	Rating
Clash	9/10
DIY	4/5 stars
The Guardian	4/5 stars
The Independent	4/5 stars
iNews	3/5 stars
The Line of Best Fit	5.5/10
musicOMH	3/5 stars
The Observer	4/5 stars
PopMatters	8/10
The Sunday Times	3/5 stars
The Telegraph	3/5 stars

At Metacritic, which assigns a normalised rating out of 100 to reviews from mainstream critics, the album has an average score of 74 out of 100, based on ten reviews, indicating "generally favorable reviews" and their highest rated to date. It was also met with universal acclaim from users with a score of 8.9 on the platform. Similarly, review aggregator AnyDecentMusic? rated Confetti 7.1 out of 10. Clash's Megan Walder praised the album's themes of "meta critiques on the music industry and driving forward with their empowering agenda to be every girl's best friend". Walder also felt that "touches of R&B, the nostalgic beats and the impeccable harmonies that the four produce offer comfort with their familiarity and still manage to feel progressive with the 2020 take on these classic elements of an iconic music era", referring to the 2000s as the iconic music era in question. Jenessa Williams of DIY agreed, saying that "Confetti feels like a proper bid for world domination, front-loaded with strong, Americanised R&B." Album tracks "Confetti" and "Rendezvous" drew comparisons to "00s compilation bangers, the sort that demand big-budget music videos that you can act out in your bedroom when no one is watching."

Alexis Petridis from The Guardian awarded the album 3 out 5 stars, saying it sounded "strangely familiar", and "hard pushed to differentiate it from its predecessor [LM5]". Petridis noted that Confetti was a "box-ticking exercise in current pop trends" including '80s inspired synths ("Break Up Song"), reggaeton beats ("Sweet Melody"), post-Daft Punk house ("Holiday"), gospel ("My Love Won't Let You Down") and Europop ("Happiness"). He concluded by saying that Confetti is exactly what you would expect, "a solid mainstream pop album – even when it's claiming that it isn't". Meanwhile The Independent's Roisin O'Connor opined that the "group's clear nineties influences mesh wonderfully with contemporary pop production". In the review O'Connor said "Confetti doesn't stray too far from the empowered glam pop that Little Mix have made their forte. Its 13 tracks are a polished mix of flirtatious bops and high-octane tracks that celebrate self-worth... sure, there's nothing groundbreaking to be found here, but it does prove that Little Mix do just fine when they're relying on their own instincts."

The album was called "triumphant" and a "celebration", referencing the group's split with Simon Cowell and their former label Syco Music, by Elisa Bray from iNews. Bray described that Confetti "is the confident album of a group who, approaching 30, have found their voice." Although Steven Loftin from The Line of Best Fit called the album a "stride forward", he said "a little more care in the craft of the big picture wouldn't go a miss". Loftin elaborated that "given the situation, almost freedom, that the assertive group find themselves in, there’s certainly a gap in Confetti that leaves you wishing there was a further step forward into something coherent." Writing for musicOMH, Nick Smith said "Confetti sees Little Mix coming out of the starting blocks power walking. There's nothing really new here". Smith went on to criticise the Auto-tune used on some of the songs but ultimately said "these talented women are now undeniably veterans of kiss-offs and pop bangers with soaring choruses. Confetti is a dependable album with recipe staples, but to keep future interest piqued, something new is now required in the mix." Kate Solomon from The Telegraph agreed with all of the prior critics' sentiments, saying that although the album is "glorious fun" it was nothing "we haven't heard before". Solomon concluded that Confetti continued a trend of "high quality" music, with "consistently attainable style" and "likeable personalities". While The Sunday Times' Will Hodgkinson said "Who would have guessed that the girl band would be thriving almost a decade later? Determination has won through and their latest album displays the chemistry and bonhomie that has got them this far." He said that the album sounded familiar, "somewhere between zippy pop and slinky R&B". Jeffrey Davies of PopMatters, went on to call Confetti the group's best work to date, describing it as "entertaining but not over the top and bold but not self-serving". He also added that the album, apart from being bold and grown-up, "is campy and fun in a way that sounds completely natural to the group". Continuing his review, he stated "With this album, Little Mix have captured the best of both worlds: the beloved dance-pop that made them famous with newfound creative freedom and power". Jacklyn Krol of PopCrush stated that the album "packs a perfect flow that takes the listener on a journey of emotions and vibes" and that it "truly feels like a liberation for the group". PopCrush also included the album as one of the "25 Best Albums of 2020".

=== Year-end lists ===
Confetti on year-end lists
Critic/Publication	List	Rank	Ref.
Billboard	The 25 Best Pop Albums of 2020	—N/a	
Style Caster	Best Albums of 2020	—N/a	`
PopCrush	25 Best Albums of 2020	—N/a	
Official Charts	Biggest Albums of 2020	—N/a	
Official Charts	Biggest Albums of 2021	—N/a	
StyleCaster	Best Albums of 2020	—N/a	

== Commercial performance ==
Confetti peaked at number one on the Irish Albums Charts, becoming Little Mix's third number one album in the country. On the UK Albums Chart, it debuted at number two selling over 49,000 copies in its opening week, 5,000 behind Kylie Minogue's Disco in which several outlets deemed to be a hotly contested chart battle. Confetti had the biggest first-week sales for an album by a British act in 2020, and was the fastest selling album by a British act that year. It also became the group's sixth consecutive top five studio album and since been certified gold by the British Phonographic Industry (BPI). As of 2022, the album has surpassed over 134,000 million streams in the UK.

Outside of the United Kingdom, the album charted within the top 10 on the Australian, Croatia, Belgian, Portuguese, Dutch, New Zealand, Lithuanian, Spanish, Scottish and Austrian albums charts. It also charted within the top 20 on the German, Polish, and Swiss Albums Chart and charted in 9 other music markets including the United States. In the United States, the album debuted at number eighty-five on the US Billboard 200 chart.

After the release of their sixth album, a trend called #RespectLittleMix went viral on Twitter, accumulating over 200,000 tweets. The trend started after fans started to have frustration towards their American label for failing to promote the group and their albums in the states. There was accusations of no physical copies of the album available for people to purchase in the states. Eventually Leigh-Anne Pinnock's mother also hit out at their US record label Columbia Records, accusing them of failing to promote the album in the US.

== Track listing ==
Confetti track listing
No.	Title	Lyrics	Music	Producer(s)	Length
1.	"Break Up Song"	Camille Purcell; Perrie Edwards; Leigh-Anne Pinnock; Jade Thirlwall	Kamille; Frank Nobel; Linus Nordstrom	Kamille^{[pv]}; Goldfingers; Raphaella^{[v]}	3:20
2.	"Holiday"	Thirlwall; Purcell; Pinnock; Edwards	Kamille; Chris Loco; Nobel; Nordstrom	Kamille^{[pv]}; Goldfingers; Chris Loco	3:33
3.	"Sweet Melody"	Tayla Parx; Uzoechi Emenike	Parx; MNEK; Brian A. Garcia; Morten Ristorp; Robin Oliver Frid	Parx; Frid; MNEK^{[pv]}; Rissi; Peoples	3:33
4.	"Confetti"	Purcell; Emenike; Maegan Cottone	Ben Kohn; Purcell; Cottone; Peter Kelleher; Tom Barnes; Emenike	TMS; Sam Klempner^{[c]}; Chris Bishop^{[c]}; MNEK^{[c]}; Cottone^{[v]}	2:47
5.	"Happiness"	Purcell; Emenike	Kohn; Purcell; Kelleher; Barnes; Emenike	TMS; Klempner^{[c]}; Bishop^{[c]}; Phil Cook^{[c]}; Cottone^{[v]}; MNEK^{[v]}	3:17
6.	"Not a Pop Song"	Pinnock; Thirlwall; Parx; Lara Maria Andersson	Frid; Parx	Parx^{[pv]}; Frid; MNEK^{[pv]}; Cottone^{[v]}	2:59
7.	"Nothing But My Feelings"	Thirlwall; Sean Douglas	Alex Niceforo; James Norton; Keith Sorrells; Warren Okay Felder	Oak; Sorrells; Alex Nice; Raphaella^{[v]}	2:42
8.	"Gloves Up"	Thirlwall; Pinnock; Cottone; Edwards	Cottone; Peter Rycroft	Lostboy	2:47
9.	"A Mess (Happy 4 U)"	Thirlwall; Janee Bennett; Pinnock; Edwards	Jin Jin; Cass Lowe	Lowe^{[pv]}; Jin Jin^{[v]}; Raphaella^{[v]}	3:29
10.	"My Love Won't Let You Down"	James Abrahart; Purcell	Kamille; Nobel; Nordstrom	Kamille^{[pv]}; Goldfingers; Raphaella^{[v]}	2:54
11.	"Rendezvous"	Andersson; Parx	Luis Traconis Molina; Norman Gimbel; Pablo Beltrán Ruiz; Frid; Parx	Parx; Frid^{[pv]}; Raphaella^{[v]}	2:56
12.	"If You Want My Love"	Purcell; Andrew Bullimore	Nobel; Kamille; Nordstrom	Kamille^{[pv]}; Goldfingers; Raphaella^{[v]}	2:40
13.	"Breathe"	Purcell	Lowe; George Astasio; Jason Pebworth; Jon Shave; Kamille	Lowe; Invisible Men; Kamille^{[v]}	3:29
Total length:					40:26

Confetti – Record Store Day 2021 LP edition (bonus track)
No.	Title	Lyrics	Music	Producer(s)	Length
14.	"Confetti" (featuring Saweetie)	Purcell; Cottone; Emenike; Diamonté Harper	Kohn; Kamille; Kelleher; Barnes; MNEK	TMS; Klempner^{[c]}; Bishop^{[c]}; MNEK^{[c]}; Cottone^{[v]}	3:04

Confetti – Japanese CD edition (bonus tracks)
No.	Title	Lyrics	Music	Producer(s)	Length
14.	"Bounce Back"	Jocelyn Donald; Jude Demorest; Normani Kordei Hamilton	Mikkel S. Eriksen; Tor Erik Hermansen; Steve M. Thornton II; Beresford Romero	Stargate; Swiff D; Kuk Harrell^{[v]}	2:40
15.	"Break Up Song" (acoustic version)	Thirlwall; Purcell; Pinnock; Edwards	Loco; Nobel; Nordstrom; Kamille	Kamille^{[pv]}; Goldfingers; Raphaella^{[v]}	3:23
16.	"Holiday" (Frank Walker remix)	Thirlwall; Purcell; Pinnock; Edwards	Loco; Nobel; Nordstrom; Kamille	Kamille^{[pv]}; Loco; Goldfingers; Frank Walker^{[r]}	3:24
Total length:					49:53

Confetti – digital expanded edition (bonus tracks)
No.	Title	Writer(s)	Producer(s)	Length
14.	"No Time for Tears" (with Nathan Dawe)		Dawe; Jean-Marie^{[pv]}; MNEK^{[v]}	3:17
15.	"Bounce Back"		Stargate; Swiff D; Harrell^{[v]}	2:40
16.	"One I've Been Missing"		Ashurst; Jean-Marie^{[pv]}; Furner^{[v]}	3:12
17.	"Break Up Song" (Nathan Dawe remix)	Purcell; Nobel; Nordstrom; Edwards; Pinnock; Thirlwall	Kamille^{[pv]}; Goldfingers; Raphaella^{[v]}; Dawe^{[r]}	3:21
18.	"Break Up Song" (Steve Void remix)	Purcell; Nobel; Nordstrom; Edwards; Pinnock; Thirlwall	Kamille^{[pv]}; Goldfingers; Raphaella^{[v]}; Steve Void^{[r]}	2:58
19.	"Break Up Song" (acoustic version)	Nobel; Thirlwall; Purcell; Pinnock; Nordstrom; Edwards	Kamille^{[pv]}; Goldfingers; Raphaella^{[v]}	3:23
20.	"Holiday" (MNEK remix)	Charmaine Sylvers; Loco; Dana Meyers; Nobel; Thirlwall; Purcell; Pinnock; Nordstrom; Nidra Beard; Edwards	Loco; Goldfingers; Kamille^{[pv]}; MNEK^{[r]}	3:38
21.	"Holiday" (220 Kid remix)	Loco; Nobel; Thirlwall; Purcell; Pinnock; Nordstrom; Edwards	Kamille^{[pv]}; Goldfingers; Loco; 220 Kid^{[r]}	3:25
22.	"Holiday" (Frank Walker remix)	Loco; Nobel; Thirlwall; Purcell; Pinnock; Nordstrom; Edwards	Kamille^{[pv]}; Loco; Goldfingers; Walker^{[r]}	3:24
23.	"Holiday" (acoustic version)	Loco; Nobel; Thirlwall; Purcell; Pinnock; Nordstrom; Edwards	Kamille^{[pv]}; Loco; Goldfingers	3:32
24.	"Sweet Melody" (PS1 remix)	Garcia; Ristorp; Frid; Parx; Emenike	Parx; Frid; MNEK^{[pv]}; Rissi; Peoples; PS1^{[r]}	3:31
25.	"Sweet Melody" (Alle Farben remix)	Garcia; Ristorp; Frid; Parx; Emenike	Parx; Frid; MNEK^{[pv]}; Rissi; Peoples; Alle Farben^{[r]}	3:21
26.	"Sweet Melody" (acoustic version)	Garcia; Ristorp; Frid; Parx; Emenike	Parx; Frid; MNEK^{[pv]}; Rissi; Peoples	3:34
Total length:				83:42

=== Notes ===
- ^{^[c]} indicates a co-producer
- ^{^[v]} indicates a vocal producer
- ^{^[pv]} indicates a primary producer as well a vocal producer
- ^{^[r]} indicates a remixer.
- "Rendezvous" contains elements of "Sway", written by Luis Demetrio and Norman Gimbel
- "Bounce Back" interpolates "Back to Life (However Do You Want Me)" by Soul II Soul

== Personnel and credits ==
Credits adapted from Tidal and Allmusic.

=== Recording locations ===
- Metropolis Studios; London, UK – (1–3, 9–13)
- State of the Ark; London, UK – (4–5)
- Sarm Studios; London, UK – (6, 9)
- Sterling Sound; Edgewater, New Jersey – mastering (1–13)

=== Musicians ===
- Jesy Nelson – vocals (all tracks)
- Leigh-Anne Pinnock – vocals (all tracks)
- Jade Thirlwall – vocals (all tracks)
- Perrie Edwards – vocals (all tracks)
- Kamille – background vocals (1, 2, 10, 12, 13, 17, 18, 20–22), bass (1, 2, 10, 12, 17, 18, 20–22), keyboards (1, 10, 12, 17, 18, 20–22), all instruments (19, 23)
- Frank Nobel – drums (1, 2, 10, 12, 17, 18, 20, 21), keyboards (1, 10, 12, 17, 18), programming (1, 2, 10, 12, 17, 18, 20, 21); bass, guitar (2, 20, 21); all instruments (19, 23)
- Linus Nordstrom – drums, programming (1, 2, 10, 12, 17, 18, 20, 21); keyboards (1, 10, 12, 17); bass, guitar (2, 20, 21); all instruments (19, 23)
- Chris Loco – keyboards, programming (2, 20–22)
- Oliver Frid – bass, drums, guitar, keyboards (3, 6, 11, 24, 25); programming (3, 6, 11, 24–26), background vocals (6), all instruments (26)
- Tom Barnes – bass, drums, programming (4, 5)
- Ben Kohn – guitar (4, 5), programming (5)
- Pete Kelleher – keyboards (4, 5), synthesiser (5)
- Phil Cook – programming (5)
- Lara Maria Andersson – background vocals (6)
- Alex Nice – programming (7)
- Keith Sorrells – programming (7)
- Lostboy – keyboards, programming (8)
- Cass Lowe – programming (9, 13); background vocals, drums, synthesiser (9); bass, keyboards (13)
- Jin Jin – background vocals (9)
- Jon Shave – keyboards (13)
- Niamh Murphy – background vocals (14)
- Tre Jean-Marie – bass, drums, piano, programming, strings, synthesiser (14, 16); keyboards (16)
- Mikkel S. Eriksen – all instruments, programming (15)
- Swiff D – all instruments, programming (15)
- Tor Hermansen – all instruments, programming (15)
- Jocelyn Donald – background vocals (15)
- Lincoln Jean-Marie – background vocals, performance arrangement (16)
- Joshua Alamu – performance arrangement (16)
- Amy Williams – background vocals (16)
- Elizabeth Alexander – background vocals (16)
- Jacob Attwooll – background vocals (16)
- Jermain Jackman – background vocals (16)
- Kate Stewart – background vocals (16)
- Layla Ley – background vocals (16)
- Michelle John – background vocals (16)
- Rachel Furner – background vocals (16)
- Simon King – background vocals (16)
- Jez Ashurst – bass, drums, guitar, keyboards, piano, programming, synthesiser, strings (16)
- Fred Cox – guitar (16)
- Nathan Dawe – remixing (17)
- Steve Void – remixing (18)
- Bloomfield – guitar (19, 23)}
- MNEK – remixing (20)
- 220 Kid – remixing (21)
- Jackson Dimiglio-Wood – programming (21)
- Frank Walker – remixing (22)
- PS1 – remixing (24)
- Alle Farben – remixing (25)

=== Technical ===
- Phil Tan – mixing (1–13, 16–25)
- Tre Jean-Marie – mixing (14), vocal engineering (16)
- Kevin "KD" Davis – mixing (15)
- Jackson Dimiglio-Wood – mixing, mastering (21)
- Goldfingers – mixing (23)
- Oliver Frid – mixing (26)
- Randy Merrill – mastering (1–13, 19, 23, 26)
- Lewis Hopkin – mastering (14)
- Chris Gehringer – mastering (15)
- Ryan Smith – mastering (16)
- Stuart Hawkes – mastering (17, 20, 24, 25)
- Steve Void – mastering (18)
- Frank Walker – mastering (22)
- Paul Norris – engineering (1, 17–19, 24), vocal engineering (2, 3, 6–14, 16, 20–22, 24, 25)
- Chris Loco – engineering (2, 20–22)
- Mikkel S. Eriksen – engineering (15)
- Thomas Warren – engineering (15)
- Gabriëlle Stok – vocal engineering (6)
- Chris Bishop – vocal engineering (7, 10, 12)
- Cass Lowe – vocal engineering (9)
- Simone Torres – vocal engineering (15)
- Alex Robinson – vocal engineering (16)
- Jamie McEvoy – vocal engineering (16)
- Bill Zimmerman – engineering assistance (2–13, 17–25)

=== Design ===
- Big Active – art direction, design
- Mariano Vivanco – photography

== Charts ==
=== Weekly charts ===
Weekly chart performance for Confetti
Chart (2020)	Peak position
Australian Albums (ARIA)	7
Austrian Albums (Ö3 Austria)	10
Belgian Albums (Ultratop Flanders)	2
Belgian Albums (Ultratop Wallonia)	25
Canadian Albums (Billboard)	37
Croatian International Albums (HDU)	8
Czech Albums (ČNS IFPI)	52
Dutch Albums (Album Top 100)	10
Finnish Albums (Suomen virallinen lista)	35
French Albums (SNEP)	52
German Albums (Offizielle Top 100)	18
Greek Albums (IFPI)	28
Hungarian Albums (MAHASZ)	10
Irish Albums (Official Charts)	1
Italian Albums (FIMI)	25
Japan Hot Albums (Billboard Japan)	65
Japanese Albums (Oricon)	104
Lithuanian Albums (AGATA)	7
New Zealand Albums (RMNZ)	7
Norwegian Albums (VG-lista)	33
Polish Albums (ZPAV)	11
Portuguese Albums (AFP)	2
Scottish Albums (Official Charts)	2
Slovak Albums (ČNS IFPI)	54
Spanish Albums (PROMUSICAE)	7
Swedish Albums (Sverigetopplistan)	46
Swiss Albums (Schweizer Hitparade)	18
UK Albums (Official Charts)	2
US Billboard 200	85
US Rolling Stone Top 200	94

=== Year-end charts ===
2020 yearly chart performance for Confetti
Chart (2020)	Position
UK Albums (OCC)	29

2021 yearly chart performance for Confetti
Chart (2021)	Position
UK Albums (OCC)	40

== Certifications ==
Certifications for Confetti
Region	Certification	Certified units/sales
Brazil (Pro-Música Brasil)	Gold	20,000^{‡}
United Kingdom (BPI)	Platinum	315,000
^{‡} Sales+streaming figures based on certification alone.

== Release history ==
Release history for Confetti
Region	Date	Format	Label	Ref.
Various	6 November 2020	Box set; cassette; CD; digital download; LP; picture disc; streaming	RCA; Columbia	

== See also ==
- List of UK top-ten albums in 2020
- List of number-one albums of 2020 (Ireland)
