= No Time for Tears (Nathan Dawe and Little Mix song) =

2020 song by Little Mix and Nathan Dawe

Single by Nathan Dawe and Little Mix
- Released: 25 November 2020
- Recorded: 2020
- Studio: Devon, UK (Stardelta); London, UK (RAK; Metropolis)
- Length: 3:16
- Label: Atlantic; Warner
- Songwriters: Jade Thirlwall; Nathan Dawe; Tre Jean-Marie; Uzoechi Emenike
- Producers: Dawe; Jean-Marie

Nathan Dawe singles chronology
"Lighter" (2020)	"No Time for Tears" (2020)	"Way Too Long" (2021)

Little Mix singles chronology
"Sweet Melody" (2020)	"No Time for Tears" (2020)	"Confetti" (2021)

Music video
- "No Time for Tears" on YouTube

"No Time for Tears" is a song released by English DJ and producer Nathan Dawe and English girl group Little Mix. It was released on 25 November 2020 by Atlantic and Warner Records. The song was written by Jade Thirlwall and MNEK, along with Nathan Dawe, and Tre Jean-Marie; the latter who also produced the single. It was the last single that Little Mix released as a quartet, before Jesy Nelson left the group in December 2020. The track reached number nineteen on the UK Singles Chart and was certified gold by the British Phonographic Industry (BPI). It was later included on the expanded edition of Little Mix's sixth studio album Confetti (2020).

== Background and composition ==
The song was announced on 23 November 2020 on both Dawe's and Little Mix's social media accounts. The song was written by Jade Thirlwall, Nathan Dawe, Tre Jean-Marie and MNEK.

In 2024, Tre Jean-Marie stated in an Instagram story that Jesy Nelson's backing vocals, as well as one lead vocal line, were sung by a backing vocalist imitating Nelson's singing style, as Nelson was "quite literally over [being in the group]". The only backing vocalist credited on the track is Niamh Murphy. Nelson left the group on 14 December 2020, less than a month after the song's release, for mental health reasons.

== Music video ==
The music video was announced on 13 January. The video was released on 15 January.

== Promotion ==
A lyric video for the song was released on 28 November 2020 on Dawe's official YouTube channel. Physical copies of the song went available for pre-order on 17 December 2020 on Nathan Dawe's official website and were released on 22 January 2021. A remix of the song by HUGEL was released on 31 December 2020. The next day, 1 January 2021, an acoustic version was released. On 22 January, a remix of the song by Mark Knight was released. A VIP remix was released on 5 February 2021, and a remix featuring British rapper Lady Leshurr was released on 4 March 2021.

== Track listing ==
Digital single

1. "No Time for Tears" – 3:16

Digital download/streaming

1. "No Time for Tears" (HUGEL remix) – 3:08

Digital download/streaming

1. "No Time for Tears" (acoustic) – 3:25

Digital download/streaming

1. "No Time for Tears" (Mark Knight remix) – 3:25

Digital download/streaming

1. "No Time for Tears" (VIP remix) – 3:06

Digital download/streaming

1. "No Time for Tears" (Lady Leshurr remix) – 3:16

Maxi single (CD single/cassette single)

1. "No Time for Tears" – 3:20
2. "No Time for Tears" (acoustic) – 3:25
3. "No Time for Tears" (HUGEL remix) – 3:08

== Credits and personnel ==
Credits adapted from Tidal and maxi single liners.

Recording locations

- RAK Studios, London (UK)
- Metropolis, London (UK)
- Stardelta Audio Mastering, Devon (UK)

Personnel

- Nathan Dawe – producer
- Little Mix – vocals
- Tre Jean-Marie – producer, bass, drums, mixer, piano, programmer, strings, synthesizer, vocal producer
- Uzoechi Emenike – vocal producer
- Niamh Murphy – backing vocals
- Paul Norris – vocal engineer
- Lewis Hopkin – mastering

== Charts ==
Chart performance for "No Time for Tears"
Chart (2020–2021)	Peak position
Croatia (HRT)	90
Czech Republic Airplay (ČNS IFPI)	39
Euro Digital Songs (Billboard)	5
Ireland (IRMA)	15
Netherlands (Dutch Top 40 Tipparade)	18
New Zealand Hot Singles (RMNZ)	35
UK Singles (Official Charts)	19
US Hot Dance/Electronic Songs (Billboard)	22

== Certifications ==
Region	Certification	Certified units/sales
United Kingdom (BPI)	Gold	400,000^{‡}
^{‡} Sales+streaming figures based on certification alone.

== Release history ==
Region	Date	Format	Version	Label	Ref.
Various	25 November 2020	Digital download; streaming	Original	Atlantic UK; Warner Music UK	
United Kingdom	4 December 2020	Contemporary hit radio	Original	Atlantic UK; Warner Music UK	
Italy	10 December 2020	Contemporary hit radio	Original	Warner Italy	
United Kingdom	12 December 2020	Adult contemporary radio	Original	Atlantic UK; Warner Music UK	
Various	31 December 2020	Digital download; streaming	HUGEL Remix	Atlantic UK; Warner Music UK	
Various	1 January 2021	Digital download; streaming	Acoustic	Atlantic UK; Warner Music UK	
Various	22 January 2021	Digital download; streaming	Mark Knight Remix	Atlantic UK; Warner Music UK	
Various	22 January 2021	CD single; cassette	Maxi single	Atlantic UK; Warner Music UK	
Various	5 February 2021	Digital download; streaming	VIP Remix	Atlantic UK; Warner Music UK	
Various	4 March 2021	Digital download; streaming	Lady Leshurr Remix	Atlantic UK; Warner Music UK	
