= Sweet Melody =

2020 single by Little Mix

Single by Little Mix

from the album Confetti
- Released: 23 October 2020
- Studio: Metropolis Studios; London, UK
- Genre: Dance-pop; reggaeton
- Length: 3:33
- Label: RCA
- Songwriters: Brian Garcia; Morten Ristorp; Robin Oliver Frid; Tayla Parx; Uzoechi Emenike
- Producers: Parx; Frid; Emenike; Ristorp; Peoples

Little Mix singles chronology
"Holiday" (2020)	"Sweet Melody" (2020)	"No Time for Tears" (2020)

Music video
- "Sweet Melody" on YouTube

"Sweet Melody" is a song by British girl group Little Mix, released through RCA Records on 23 October 2020, as the third single from the group's sixth studio album Confetti (2020). Little Mix worked with notable names and frequent collaborators Tayla Parx, Morten Ristorp, Robin Frid, Brian Garcia, and MNEK, who co-written and co-produced the track. It has since been regarded as one of the group's best releases.

"Sweet Melody" was met with widespread acclaim from music critics who described it as a girl group classic with some citing it as a stand out single amongst their previous releases and lead single material from the group's sixth album Confetti. Furthermore, praise was given towards the song's production; describing it as "perfectly structured" with Billboard naming it as one of the best releases of 2020. It peaked at number one on the UK Singles Chart, in January 2021, becoming the group's fifth number one single in the UK and their first since "Shout Out to My Ex" was released in 2016. It reached the top ten in five other territories.

An accompanying choreography-based music video was released and features individual and group shots of the members performing dance routines, filmed in an abandoned warehouse. It would mark the group's last music video with Jesy Nelson, who left the group in the same year. The video was later nominated for "Best Pop Video" at the 2021 UK Music Video Awards. To promote the song, the group performed the track at the 2020 MTV Europe Music Awards, in which they co-hosted and performed it on The Jonathan Ross Show, and Little Mix The Search.

== Background and release ==
On 18 October 2020, the group posted a teaser video to Twitter, hinting at a forthcoming announcement. The next day, they posted an official announcement and release date for the song along with a preview of the track. In November 2020, during an interview for Gay Times producer MNEK revealed "Sweet Melody" was originally crafted for a Demi Lovato songwriting camp three years prior. It was later offered to Selena Gomez, JoJo, Zara Larsson and Hailee Steinfeld and eventually pitched to Little Mix. Thirlwall added that "Leigh-Anne and I were in LA, and did a few sessions with Tayla Parx, who played us this song, which she’d done with MNEK, who we have worked with a lot. The song tells a story a to me, and is like the big sister to "Touch".

== Production and composition ==
Critics described "Sweet Melody" as a dance-pop and pop song with reggaeton drum beats, and elements of Latin Kpop and trap beats. It was written by frequent collaborators Brian Garcia, Robin Oliver Frid, Morten Ristorp, Tayla Parx, MNEK, and produced by Tayla Parx, Oliver Frid, MNEK, Rissi, and Peoples. It lyrically addresses the ending of relationship and the deception that follows and runs for a 3 minutes and 33 seconds.

== Critical reception ==
"Sweet Melody" was met with widespread acclaim from music critics. Jordan Robledo of Gay Times, said: "Sweet Melody is an empowering track that touches upon on the ending of relationships and the deception that follows. It is also showstopping stand out amongst their recent singles."

Alexis Petrdis of The Guardian, described the song as a standout single incorporating reggaeton beats. Elisa Bray from i-News said "the song boasts an infectious tune with feisty lyrics matching its Latin rhythm." Will Hodgekinson of The Times said "The lyrics 'He would lie, he would cheat over syncopated beats," shows the group singing "of an unnamed boy band member on the Latin-tinged track that is Sweet Melody,".

Billboard, named the song as one of the best of 2020, stating "Sweet melody is a slick banger that sees the group delivering a sizzling takedown of some dude in a band who "would lie, would cheat, over syncopated beats." The song was also included on their list of best pop songs of 2020. In the same year it was named as favourite song of the year in a voting poll done by Billboard.

Attitude included the song #3 on their list of 32 greatest Little Mix singles of all time writing "Sweet Melody was an instant girl group classic. It’s one of those songs with little details in the production and vocals that open itself up to you more and more each time you listen."

== Music video ==
On 21 October 2020, Little Mix started teasing the release date of their music video by sharing snippets of the music video on their social media pages. A day later, they announced via Twitter that the music video would be released on 23 October where it was uploaded to YouTube. On 20 November, an official lyric video created by a fan was released. On 27 November, a vertical video version was uploaded to their YouTube channel.

"Sweet Melody" was directed by KC Locke and filmed at an abandoned warehouse. It begins with the girls stood against a flaming backdrop, with Jade wearing a black bra underneath a sheer black long-sleeved top, with trousers attached to her suspenders and her hair in braided locks. Perrie is dressed in a black bra with matching trousers and a cropped jacket. Jesy is seen dressed wearing a black and white bodysuit and a pair of thigh high boots, while Leigh-Anne sports a strappy black crop top which she pairs with black trousers. The video features different segments with individual shots of all four members performing their own choreography with back up dancers and coming together for a group routine.

The music video for "Sweet Melody" was the last one to feature former member Jesy Nelson, who left the group in December 2020. In 2021, she revealed that the shooting of the video caused her to experience panic attacks while on set, recalling that she was also rushed to the hospital following symptoms stemming from an eating disorder that she was dealing with at the time and a suicide attempt the next month. The incident was particularly worsened by the label's demands during the COVID-19 pandemic, after which her mother advised that she should leave Little Mix to focus on her mental health.

== Live performances ==
The debut performance of "Sweet Melody" was on the first live show of Little Mix The Search. Group member Jade Thirlwall was absent on the day of the performance as she was self-isolating as a precaution at the time, after several members of the production crew had tested positive for COVID-19 a week prior. On 8 November, Little Mix performed "Sweet Melody" at the 2020 MTV Europe Music Awards, which they also hosted. On 21 November, Little Mix performed the song on The Jonathan Ross Show. Jesy Nelson was absent from both of these performances.

The song was added as the final number to the setlist of the Confetti Tour, Little Mix's last concert tour before going on a hiatus.

== Commercial performance ==
"Sweet Melody" entered at number eight on the UK Singles Chart for the week ending 5 November 2020, becoming their 16th top ten hit on the chart. It also became their highest charting single since Woman Like Me (2018). "Sweet Melody" reached the top of the UK Singles Chart in the week ending 14 January 2021, becoming Little Mix's fifth number one on the chart, and their first since "Shout Out to My Ex" in October 2016. This moved Little Mix to joint 11th on the list of artists with most number-one singles on the UK Singles Chart. It was the group's first chart-topper since the departure of founding member Jesy Nelson, although her vocals are on the song. It later surpassed Shout Out to My Ex and Touch, becoming the group's longest-reigning Top 5 single. It spent a total of thirteen weeks inside the top 10 of the UK Charts, becoming their longest running Top 10 single there.

Outside of the United Kingdom "Sweet Melody" also topped the charts in North Macedonia, Scotland, and the Official Big Top 40 charts, breaking the record for the group with the most number-ones. The song reached the top ten in four other music markets including Ireland, becoming the band's tenth top ten single in the country. It later reached a new peak of number seven, and was their first top ten hit in Ireland since "Woman Like Me" which peaked at number three on the Irish Singles Chart in 2018. "Sweet Melody" charted in thirteen other territories including Lithuania, Portugal and Switzerland.

== Track listing ==
Digital download and streaming

1. "Sweet Melody" – 3:33

Digital download and streaming – PS1 remix

1. "Sweet Melody" (PS1 remix) – 3:30

Digital download and streaming – Alle Farben remix

1. "Sweet Melody" (Alle Farben remix) – 3:21

Digital download and streaming – karaoke

1. "Sweet Melody" (karaoke version) – 3:30

== Charts ==
=== Weekly charts ===
Weekly chart performance for "Sweet Melody"
Chart (2020–2021)	Peak position
Belgium (Ultratip Bubbling Under Flanders)	8
Croatia (HRT)	20
Bolivia Anglo (Monitor Latino)	7
Euro Digital Songs (Billboard)	3
Global 200 (Billboard)	72
Guatemala Anglo (Monitor Latino)	17
Greece (IFPI)	78
Hungary (Single Top 40)	17
Ireland (IRMA)	7
Lithuania (AGATA)	99
Latvia (Latvijas Top 40)	11
Macedonia (Radiomonitor)	1
Netherlands (Single Tip)	2
New Zealand Hot Singles (RMNZ)	8
Portugal (AFP)	80
Romania (Airplay 100)	89
Scotland Singles (OCC)	1
Switzerland (Schweizer Hitparade)	83
Peru Anglo (Monitor Latino)	11
UK Singles (OCC)	1
US Digital Song Sales (Billboard)	39
Uruguay Anglo (Monitor Latino)	14
United Arab Emirates (Radiomonitor)	19

=== Year-end charts ===
Year-end chart performance for "Sweet Melody"
Chart (2021)	Position
UK Singles (OCC)	47

== Accolades ==
=== Rankings ===
Publication	Accolade	Rank	Ref.
Billboard	Best Pop Songs of 2020	—N/a	
Billboard	Favourite song of 2020	1	
Billboard	Best Songs of 2020	99	

=== Industry awards ===
Publication	Accolade	Result	Ref.
Official Charts Awards	Official Charts Awards for Official Singles Chart Number One	Won	
UK Music Video Awards	Best Pop Video	Nominated	
The Official Big Top 40	Official Big Top 40 Charts Number One Award	Won	

== Certifications ==
Certifications for "Sweet Melody"
Region	Certification	Certified units/sales
Brazil (Pro-Música Brasil)	Platinum	40,000^{‡}
Mexico (AMPROFON)	Gold	30,000^{‡}
New Zealand (RMNZ)	Gold	15,000^{‡}
Poland (ZPAV)	Gold	10,000^{‡}
United Kingdom (BPI)	2× Platinum	1,200,000^{‡}
^{‡} Sales+streaming figures based on certification alone.

== Release history ==
Release dates and formats for "Sweet Melody"
Region	Date	Format	Version	Label	Ref.
Various	23 October 2020	Digital download; streaming	Original	RCA UK	
Various	23 October 2020	Digital download; streaming	PS1 remix	RCA UK	
Various	5 November 2020	Digital download; streaming	Alle Farben remix	RCA UK	
Australia	6 November 2020	Contemporary hit radio	Original	Sony	
Various	5 January 2021	Digital download; streaming	Karaoke	RCA UK	

== See also ==
- List of UK top-ten singles in 2020
- List of UK top-ten singles in 2021
- List of top 10 singles in 2020 (Ireland)
- List of top 10 singles in 2021 (Ireland)
- List of UK Singles Downloads Chart number ones of the 2020s
- List of UK Singles Chart number ones of the 2020s
