= Little Mix The Search =

British television series

- Genre: Reality competition
- Creative directors: Paul Newton; Rob Davies
- Presented by: Chris Ramsey (live shows only)
- Judges: Perrie Edwards; Jesy Nelson; Leigh-Anne Pinnock; Jade Thirlwall
- Composer: Rob Derbyshire
- Country of origin: United Kingdom
- Original language: English
- No. of series: 1
- No. of episodes: 9

Production
- Executive producers: Andrea Hamilton; Leanne Witcoop
- Editor: Amy Boyle
- Running time: 59–86 minutes
- Production company: ModestTV

Original release
- Network: BBC One
- Release: 26 September – 7 November 2020

Little Mix The Search is a British reality television music competition that was announced in October 2019, and began airing on BBC One on 26 September 2020, concluding with the final on 7 November 2020. The series was judged by British girl group Little Mix, with the winning act from the series joining them on The Confetti Tour (2022). In August 2021 it was announced that the show had been put on an "indefinite hold" after one series.

== History ==
The premise for Little Mix The Search was announced in October 2019, when applications for the show were opened. The premise of The Search was for British girl group Little Mix to find singers to form a new group. It was confirmed that the members of Little Mix, Leigh-Anne Pinnock, Jade Thirlwall, Perrie Edwards and Jesy Nelson, would act as judges. Applications closed on 10 January 2020, and filming commenced later that month. In March 2020, it was announced that comedian Chris Ramsey would be presenting The Search.

The auditions and group formation episodes had been filmed and were set to air on BBC One in April 2020 with the live shows following shortly afterwards. However, due to the COVID-19 pandemic, their Summer 2020 Tour was cancelled and the series was postponed while the production team debated how to proceed under lockdown guidelines. When asked about the effect of the pandemic on The Search, Edwards said: "The live shows bit is coming, obviously we don’t know when but everything else before the live shows we’ve already filmed. So everything’s good to go, we’re basically just waiting for lockdown." On 20 July 2020, it was announced that the series would premiere later in the year, later confirmed to be on 26 September 2020, beginning with the pre-filmed auditions and group formation episodes, before commencing the live shows under social distancing guidelines. The groups competed for a chance to support Little Mix on their Confetti Tour in 2021, later rescheduled to 2022.

On 14 October 2020, it was announced via Twitter that the first live episode, originally set for broadcast on 17 October, had been postponed to 24 October due to several members of the production crew having been tested positive for COVID-19 and entering self-isolation. The showrunners and producers confirmed that none of the members of Little Mix tested positive for the virus. On 21 October, it was announced that Thirlwall, who had decided to self-isolate at home as a precaution, would appear during the first live episode solely via video link. On 24 October, Little Mix performed "Sweet Melody" as part of the "Battle of the Bands" episode, a performance that Thirlwall was absent for. On 31 October, the semi-final was postponed to 6 November in favour of a BBC News special due to the announcement of new COVID-19 lockdown restrictions in England, with the final following it on 7 November. On 7 November, it was announced that Nelson would be unable to appear during the final due to an illness; she would ultimately quit the band just over a month after the series had concluded.

== Cancellation ==
On 26 August 2021, it was announced that the show would not be returning for a second series and had been put on an "indefinite hold", with the head of BBC Entertainment citing Edwards' and Pinnock's pregnancies as a factor.

== Episodes ==
No.	Episode	Original release date
1	"Boyband"	26 September 2020
Little Mix kick off the series by searching for a boyband. Boyband line-up (New Priority): Adam, Kaci, Lee, Talis and Zeekay.
2	"Mixed Group"	27 September 2020
The search continues as Little Mix look for singers to form a mixed group. Mixed group line-up (Jasper Blue): Jordan, Rosie, Liam and Melina.
3	"Girl Vocal"	3 October 2020
Little Mix search for a girl vocal group. Girl vocal group line-up (Nostalia): Tamara, Mya-Louise, Esther, Shanice and Tyler.
4	"Vocal & Instruments"	4 October 2020
Three bands have been established, and Little Mix search for singers and instrumentalists for their vocal & instruments group. Vocal & instruments group line-up (Since September): Matthew, Jacob, Harry and Patrick.
5	"Girl Dance"	10 October 2020
Little Mix search for a girl dance group. Girl dance group line-up (Melladaze): Megan, Ellie, Liv, Aislí and Lauren.
6	"Rap R&B"	11 October 2020
Little Mix search for singers and rappers to form a rap R&B group. Rap R&B line-up (YChange): Romina, VerSay, Eden and Ashley.
7	"Battle of the Bands"	24 October 2020
With the band names revealed for the first time, all the bands perform in front of Little Mix and a live audience for a place in the semi-final.
8	"Semi-Final"	6 November 2020
The remaining five bands perform in front of Little Mix and a live audience for a place in the final.
9	"The Final"	7 November 2020
The finalists perform twice in front of a live audience, with a public vote to determine the winner of Little Mix The Search.

== Live performances ==
Colour key
Indicates that the group was in the bottom two and had to perform again in the sing off
Indicates that the group was eliminated
Indicates that the group won the competition

=== "Battle of the Bands" (24 October 2020) ===
Special Performances:

- Little Mix – "Sweet Melody"
- Jax Jones and Au/Ra - "I Miss U"

Contestants' performances on the first live show
Band	Order	Song(s)	Score	Leaderboard	Result
Since September	1	"I Knew You Were Trouble"	84%	4th	Advanced
Nostalia	2	"Case of the Ex"/"Try Again"	90%	2nd	Advanced
New Priority	3	"Can't Feel My Face"	87%	3rd	Advanced
Jasper Blue	4	"Just Got Paid"	79%	5th	Bottom two
YChange	5	"West Ten"	94%	1st	Advanced
Melladaze	6	"Sucker"/"Get Right"	77%	6th	Bottom two
Sing-off details
Jasper Blue	1	"Walk Me Home"			Eliminated
Melladaze	2	"We Got Love"			Saved (4 Votes)

Little Mix's votes to send through to the semi-final

- Thirlwall: Melladaze
- Pinnock: Melladaze
- Edwards: Melladaze
- Nelson was not required to vote as there was already a majority, but confirmed she would have voted to send through Melladaze.

=== "Semi-Final" (6 November 2020) ===
Special Performances:

- Little Mix – "Holiday"/"Touch"
- McFly – "Tonight is the Night"

Contestants' performances on the second live show
Band	Order	Song(s)	Score	Leaderboard	Result
Melladaze	1	"Kings & Queens"/"Where Have You Been"	92%	2nd	Advanced
YChange	2	"Gotta Get Thru This"	90%	3rd	Advanced
New Priority	3	"Into You"	78%	5th	Bottom two
Since September	4	"Watermelon Sugar"	89%	4th	Bottom two
Nostalia	5	"As"	95%	1st	Advanced
Sing-off details
New Priority	1	"Lose Somebody"			Eliminated
Since September	2	"Before You Go"			Saved (Tie - Majority of panel later agreed)

Little Mix's votes to send through to the final

- Pinnock: New Priority
- Thirlwall: Since September
- Nelson: New Priority
- Edwards: Since September

With the acts in the bottom two receiving two votes each, the girls had to deliberate with each other to decide whom to send through to the final. Pinnock was given the casting vote and eventually chose to send Since September through to the final.

=== "Final" (7 November 2020) ===
Special Performances:

- Little Mix – "Secret Love Song"
- Zara Larsson – "WOW"

Contestants' performances on the third and final live show
Band	Order	First song	Score	Order	Second song	Score	Leaderboard	Place on Little Mix: The Search
YChange	1	"All of the Lights"/"Never Forget You"	284/300	5	"Runnin' (Lose It All)"	300/300	Joint 1st	Top Four
Since September	2	"Don't Look Back in Anger"/"Survivor"	280/300	6	"Drag Me Down"/"Old Town Road"	300/300	3rd	Winners
Melladaze	3	"Confident"/"Kill This Love"	279/300	7	"Get Lucky"	284/300	4th	Top Four
Nostalia	4	"No Scrubs"/"Shackles (Praise You)"	284/300	8	"When the Party's Over"/"Diamonds"	300/300	Joint 1st	Top Four

== Results summary ==
Colour key
Indicates that the group had the highest score and won the episode
Indicates that the group was in the bottom two and had to perform again in the sing-off
Indicates that the group was eliminated from the competition
Indicates that the group won Little Mix The Search
Indicates that the group was a runner-up

Band Name	Band Type	Battle of the Bands		Semi-Final		The Final
Band Name	Band Type	Score	Ranking	Score	Ranking	The Final
Since September	Vocal & Instruments	84%	4th	89%	4th	Winner
Nostalia	Girl Vocal	90%	2nd	95%	1st	Runner-up
Melladaze	Girl Dance	77%	6th	92%	2nd	Runner-up
YChange	Rap R&B	94%	1st	90%	3rd	Runner-up
New Priority	Boyband	87%	3rd	78%	5th	Eliminated (Semi-Final)
Jasper Blue	Mixed Group	79%	5th (6th in the show)	Eliminated (Battle of the Bands)		

== Awards and nominations ==
Year	Award	Category	Result	Ref.
2020	I Talk Telly Awards	Best Talent Show	Won	
2021	National Television Awards	Best Talent Show	Nominated	
