= Break Up Song (Little Mix song) =

2020 single by Little Mix

Single by Little Mix

from the album Confetti
- Released: 27 March 2020
- Studio: Metropolis Studios; London, UK
- Genre: Synth-pop
- Length: 3:20
- Label: RCA
- Songwriters: Jade Thirlwall; Perrie Edwards; Leigh-Anne Pinnock; Kamille; Frank Nobel; Linus Nordstrom
- Producers: Kamille; Goldfingers

Little Mix singles chronology
| "One I've Been Missing" (2019) | "Break Up Song" (2020) | "Holiday" (2020) |

Music video
- "Break Up Song" on YouTube

"Break Up Song" is a song by British girl group Little Mix. It was released on 27 March 2020 as the lead single from the group's sixth studio album Confetti (2020). The group co-wrote the song with Frank Nobel and producers Kamille and Goldfingers a year before it was chosen as the album's lead single. "Break Up Song" received positive reviews from critics and it has been described it as a synth-pop track influenced by 1980s pop music. The song addresses themes of heartbreak and independence after overcoming an ex.

== Composition ==
Little Mix members Perrie Edwards, Leigh-Anne Pinnock and Jade Thirlwall wrote "Break Up Song" with Frank Nobel, and producers Kamille and Goldfingers. According to Thirlwall, they wrote the song more than a year prior to its release with 1980s pop music and an element of nostalgia in mind, similar to that of their 2015 single "Black Magic". It was one of seven songs that Edwards, Pinnock and Thirlwall composed with Kamille in a single day, after having only one melody from a previous frustrating session. The track's 1980s sound stemmed from a synthesiser they dabbled with in the studio.

A different song was initially chosen as their sixth album's lead single with an accompanying music video already filmed. However, the group opted for "Break Up Song" at the last minute after hearing the demo again during a playback session. The demo had only one verse and main line. Edwards described it as "very basic at the time. The beat was all over the place and it was really, really rough – but it just had something about it." Thirlwall recalled, "We got that jittery feeling that we had with "Shout Out to My Ex" and "Black Magic" where it just felt special."

Thirlwall described the track as "a very feel-good kind of empowerment song about going out and just forgetting about all your woes and troubles". It was also called an "80s-synth pop anthem" about "getting over the end of a relationship".

== Critical reception ==
Glenn Rowley from Billboard described the song as an "80s-inspired anthem that see the members celebrate their independence after ditching the deadbeat men in their lives... the foursome sing over danceable pop production on the track's pulsating chorus." Lewis Corner from Gay Times wrote, "The group are back with an 80s-tinged pop anthem that’ll swoop you out of your isolation blues. 'Break Up Song' is a whopper of a return, pairing love-lorn lyrics with sky-soaring synths.".

Attitude said "After teasing the start of a new musical era, Little Mix are back today with retro-tinged, synth-slick track 'Break Up Song' – and it's making us reach for the legwarmers. As the name implies, it's a track about relationships that didn't last, and the aftermath that comes with them." MTV wrote, "Little Mix officially launched a new era on Friday with the shimmering, shake-him-off anthem 'Break Up Song'. It's a high-gloss single that fuses the perkiness of 'Black Magic' and the blissful liberation of 'Shout Out To My Ex'." i said "'Break Up Song' is an 80s electro-pop opener that encapsulates the jubilant energy found throughout".

=== Year-end lists ===
"Break Up Song" on year-end lists
| Critic/Publication | List | Rank | Ref. |
|---|---|---|---|
| Idolator | Best Pop Songs of 2021 | 26 | |

== Promotion ==
A Little Mix-themed filter on Instagram was made available to the group's followers to promote the track. The song was released on 27 March 2020, and on the same day a Spotify vertical video and a lyric video were both released. The latter was made by Kayleigh, a fan of the band from the Netherlands.

== Music video ==
Little Mix announced the official music video for the song on 7 May 2020 on their social media, and it was released a day later at 9am BST. The music video, directed by Zac Ella, was semi-animated, as the planned video shoot for the song had to be cancelled due to the COVID-19 pandemic. The group filmed portions of the video at home using the original concept. The animation of the video used felt fabric textures to depict the band. In the video, the animated part was focused on the group hosting a Good Morning Britain-style breakfast show on a television channel called LM TV. Leigh-Anne Pinnock plays a news reporter, while Jesy Nelson presents the weather forecast. Perrie Edwards plays a fitness mentor, while Jade Thirlwall tackles the latest fashion, with each of them having their own segment in their respective verses of the song. The video also includes real-life clips of the band dancing to the song while dressed in different styles of 80's clothing.

== Live performances ==
On 21 August 2020, Little Mix performed "Break Up Song" for the first time as part of the set list for their Little Mix Uncancelled concert. The song was later performed on the eighteenth series of Strictly Come Dancing in December 2020, with member Jesy Nelson absent from the performance. The song was also performed on their seventh concert tour The Confetti Tour in 2022.

== Track listing ==
Digital download and streaming

1. "Break Up Song" – 3:20

Digital download and streaming – acoustic

1. "Break Up Song" (acoustic version) – 3:22

Digital download and streaming – Nathan Dawe remix

1. "Break Up Song" (Nathan Dawe remix) – 3:21

Digital download and streaming – Steve Void remix

1. "Break Up Song" (Steve Void remix) – 2:57

Streaming – Break Up Song – EP

1. "Break Up Song" – 3:20
2. "Break Up Song" (acoustic version) – 3:22
3. "Break Up Song" (Nathan Dawe remix) – 3:21
4. "Break Up Song" (Steve Void remix) – 2:57

== Personnel ==
Credits adapted from Qobuz.

- Jesy Nelson – vocals
- Leigh-Anne Pinnock – vocals, songwriting
- Jade Thirlwall – vocals, songwriting
- Perrie Edwards – vocals, songwriting
- Kamille – production, keyboards, vocal production, bass, background vocals
- Goldfingers – production, drums, keyboards, programming
- Raphaella Mazaheri-Asadi – vocal production
- Frank Nobel – drums, keyboards, programming
- Phil Tan – mixing
- Paul Norris – engineering
- Bill Zimmerman – engineering assistance
- Randy Merrill – mastering

== Commercial performance ==
"Break Up Song" reached the top ten in the UK, becoming Little Mix's fifteenth top ten single in the country. It was ranked at number 33 on the list of the best-selling songs of 2020 in the UK. "Break Up Song" also charted in six other countries including Ireland, Greece, and Portugal, and reached the top ten of the Australian, Euro and Switzerland Digital Songs Sales charts. It has been certified platinum by the British Phonographic Industry (BPI) and certified gold by Pro-Música Brasil (PMB).

== Charts ==
=== Weekly charts ===
Weekly chart performance for "Break Up Song"
| Chart (2020) | Peak position |
|---|---|
| Australia Digital Song Sales (Billboard) | 4 |
| Belgium (Ultratip Bubbling Under Flanders) | 7 |
| Belgium (Ultratip Bubbling Under Wallonia) | 15 |
| Canadian Hot Digital Song Sales (Billboard) | 49 |
| Croatia (HRT) | 43 |
| Euro Digital Songs (Billboard) | 2 |
| Greece (IFPI) | 81 |
| Hungary (Rádiós Top 40) | 6 |
| Hungary (Single Top 40) | 11 |
| Ireland (IRMA) | 18 |
| Netherlands (Dutch Top 40 Tipparade) | 10 |
| Netherlands (Single Tip) | 18 |
| New Zealand Hot Singles (RMNZ) | 9 |
| Portugal (AFP) | 142 |
| Scotland Singles (OCC) | 2 |
| Switzerland (Schweizer Hitparade) | 29 |
| Switzerland Digital Song Sales (Billboard) | 3 |
| UK Singles (OCC) | 9 |

=== Year-end charts ===
2020 year-end chart performance for "Break Up Song"
| Chart (2020) | Position |
|---|---|
| UK Singles (OCC) | 84 |

2021 year-end chart performance for "Break Up Song"
| Chart (2021) | Position |
|---|---|
| Hungary (Rádiós Top 40) | 92 |

2022 year-end chart performance for "Break Up Song"
| Chart (2022) | Position |
|---|---|
| Hungary (Rádiós Top 40) | 11 |

2023 year-end chart performance for "Break Up Song"
| Chart (2023) | Position |
|---|---|
| Hungary (Rádiós Top 40) | 79 |

== Certifications ==
| Region | Certification | Certified units/sales |
|---|---|---|
| Brazil (Pro-Música Brasil) | Gold | 20,000^{‡} |
| United Kingdom (BPI) | Platinum | 600,000^{‡} |
^{‡} Sales+streaming figures based on certification alone.

== Release history ==
Release dates and formats for "Break Up Song"
| Region | Date | Format | Version | Label(s) | Ref. |
|---|---|---|---|---|---|
| Various | 27 March 2020 | Digital download; streaming | Original | RCA UK | |
| Various | 27 March 2020 | Digital download; streaming | Nathan Dawe remix | RCA UK | |
| Various | 27 March 2020 | Digital download; streaming | Steve Void remix | RCA UK | |
| Various | 27 March 2020 | Streaming | Remix EP | RCA UK | |
| Australia | 27 March 2020 | Contemporary hit radio | Original | Sony | |
| Various | 10 April 2020 | Digital download; streaming | Acoustic | RCA UK | |

== See also ==
- List of UK top-ten singles in 2020
