= Touch (Little Mix song) =

Single by Little Mix

from the album Glory Days
- Released: 9 December 2016
- Genre: Dance-pop; tropical house
- Length: 3:33
- Label: Syco
- Songwriters: Hanni Ibrahim; Patrick Patrikios; A.S. Govere; Phil Plested
- Producers: MNEK; Cottone

Little Mix singles chronology
"Shout Out to My Ex" (2016)	"Touch" (2016)	"No More Sad Songs" (2017)

Kid Ink singles chronology
"I Love You" (2017)	"Touch" (2017)	"F with U" (2017)

Music video
- "Touch" on YouTube

"Touch" is a song by British girl group Little Mix. The song was originally released as a promotional single before being announced as the second single from the group's fourth studio album Glory Days (2016). A remix of the song featuring American rapper Kid Ink is featured on the album's reissue Glory Days: The Platinum Edition.

"Touch" is a dance pop track with elements of tropical house. It received positive reviews from critics, with praise given to its empowering message about being in tune with your sexuality and feeling confident in your own skin. It has since been cited as a gay anthem, and a fan favourite among their discography. It reached number four on the UK Singles Chart, becoming the group's tenth top-ten single in the country.

The song also reached the top ten in Ireland and the top twenty in Australia and on the Mexico Ingles Airplay chart, and charted in ten other countries including Hungary and New Zealand. It has since been certified triple platinum in the United Kingdom, double platinum in Brazil and Australia, and has received one platinum and five gold music certifications in other countries. The song was nominated for British Single of the Year and Best British Video of the Year at the 2018 Brit Awards.

== Background and release ==
Preceding the release of Glory Days, "Touch" was released as the fourth promotional single on 15 November 2016. On 5 December 2016, Little Mix announced that the song would become their second single from the album and was later released on 9 December 2016. On 28 February 2017, a remix featuring Kid Ink was also made available.

== Composition and critical reception ==
"Touch" is a dance-pop and tropical house song. The song has been described as a "club anthem" by several critics. Lewis Corner from Digital Spy gave the song a positive review, describing it as "more than ready for the dancefloor with dancehall vibes, bouncy beats and an infectious chorus that's enough to take over the whole of your body."

Zoe Briggs from OK! magazine commented: "Sending social media into a total meltdown with the music release, Little Mix fans are happy to see The X Factor winners doing what they do best. However, after being labelled as one of their sexiest music videos yet, Perrie Edwards has continued to cause controversy with her fashion choices." Glamour praised the video: "Perrie, Jesy, Leigh Anne and Jade can all be seen showing off some pretty excellent dance moves as they are joined with a load of hot banking dancers. It's a tough job, eh girls?"

The song was ranked as one of the most underrated pop songs of 2016 by Billboard.

In 2021, "Touch" was named by BuzzFeed as a gay anthem.

Attitude named the song number two on their list of 32 greatest Little Mix singles of all time stating "‘Touch is a club staple as well as a genuine all round crowd pleaser. Everything from MNEK's sublime production, to the sensual verses, as well as the euphoric “golden” middle 8, makes listening to 'Touch' a truly religious experience."

Comedian Phil Wang stated that "Touch" "might be greatest pop song of the 21st century".

== Music video ==
The music video was released to Little Mix's YouTube account on 19 January 2017. The video was directed by Director X and Parris Goebel. The video takes place at a colourful maze, where the girls perform choreography with their male dancers. The music video was ranked as one of the sexiest music videos of 2017 by MTV.

== Promotion and live performances ==
On 5 December 2016, Little Mix announced via their social media that "Touch" would be the second single from Glory Days. The song was performed as a medley with "Oops", featuring Charlie Puth, on 11 December 2016 on The X Factor UK to coincide with the fifth anniversary of Little Mix winning the show. The band started off by performing the intro of the acoustic version of the song before switching to the original version of the song for the chorus. Little Mix performed "Touch" on the Today Show in the US on 28 February 2017 and on The Late Late Show with James Corden on 28 March 2017. The group performed the song with modified lyrics at the 2017 Kids' Choice Awards as a medley with their song "Shout Out to My Ex" on 11 March 2017. On 19 April 2020, the group performed an acoustic version of the song on the UK exclusive broadcast of the One World: Together at Home concert.

On 1 February 2017, the group posted behind the scenes footage of their "Touch" music video shoot on YouTube. The group released a maze game inspired by the song's music video with the song playing all throughout the game to celebrate their nomination for British Artist Video Of The Year at the 2018 Brit Awards.

== Chart performance ==
Before "Touch" was released as the second single from the album, it debuted at number 62 on the UK Singles Chart. The song re-entered the charts at number 23 following its official release, and the following week the song peaked at number four, where it stayed for three weeks, becoming the group's tenth top-ten single in the UK. As of June 2019, it ranked as the seventh-best selling single by a girl group in the United Kingdom.

Elsewhere "Touch" debuted within the top five in Scotland and Ireland and the top twenty in Australia. It charted in a further ten other countries including Canada and the Netherlands.

== Charts ==
=== Weekly charts ===
Chart (2016–2017)	Peak position
Australia (ARIA)	13
Belgium (Ultratop 50 Flanders)	24
Belgium (Ultratip Bubbling Under Wallonia)	23
Canada Hot 100 (Billboard)	57
Czech Republic Singles Digital (ČNS IFPI)	40
Europe (Euro Digital Songs)	5
France (SNEP)	195
Hungary (Single Top 40)	37
Ireland (IRMA)	5
Mexico Ingles Airplay (Billboard)	10
Netherlands (Dutch Top 40 Tipparade)	10
Netherlands (Single Top 100)	69
New Zealand (Recorded Music NZ)	22
Philippines (Philippine Hot 100)	33
Portugal (AFP)	77
Scottish Singles Sales (Official Charts)	3
Slovakia Airplay (ČNS IFPI)	50
Slovakia Singles Digital (ČNS IFPI)	45
UK Singles (Official Charts)	4

=== Year-end charts ===
Chart (2017)	Position
Australia (ARIA)	77
Belgium (Ultratop Flanders)	93
UK Singles (Official Charts Company)	17

== Certifications ==
Region	Certification	Certified units/sales
Australia (ARIA)	2× Platinum	140,000^{‡}
Belgium (BRMA)	Gold	10,000^{‡}
Brazil (Pro-Música Brasil)	2× Platinum	120,000^{‡}
Canada (Music Canada)	Platinum	80,000^{‡}
Denmark (IFPI Danmark)	Gold	45,000^{‡}
Italy (FIMI)	Gold	25,000^{‡}
Netherlands (NVPI)	Gold	20,000^{‡}
New Zealand (RMNZ)	2× Platinum	60,000^{‡}
Poland (ZPAV)	Gold	25,000^{‡}
United Kingdom (BPI)	3× Platinum	1,800,000^{‡}
^{‡} Sales+streaming figures based on certification alone.

== Cover versions ==
- British singer-songwriter Ed Sheeran covered the song during BBC Live Lounge in 2017.
- Anne-Marie performed a mashup of "Touch" and "Shape of You" for Capital in 2018.
- In 2018, "Touch" was covered on the show Produce 48, a South Korean reality competition.
- Yoohyeon from the South Korean girl group Dreamcatcher covered the song in 2017.
- Mabel released a stripped back cover version of the song during BBC Live Lounge in 2019.

== Release history ==
Release dates and formats for "Touch"
Region	Date	Format	Label	Ref.
United Kingdom	9 December 2016	Contemporary hit radio	Syco; Sony	
Italy	27 January 2017	Contemporary hit radio	Sony	
