= The Get Weird Tour =

2016 concert tour by Little Mix

- Tour by Little Mix
- Location: Europe; Asia; Oceania
- Associated album: Get Weird
- Start date: 13 March 2016
- End date: 27 August 2016
- Legs: 4
- No. of shows: 55
- Box office: $25.7 million
- Website: Get Weird Tour

Little Mix concert chronology
- Salute Tour (2014); The Get Weird Tour (2016); The Glory Days Tour (2017-2018)

The Get Weird Tour was the third concert tour and the first worldwide tour held by British girl group Little Mix, in support of their third studio album, Get Weird, announced in July 2015. The tour began on 13 March 2016 in Cardiff, Wales and concluded on 27 August 2016 in Newmarket, England.

The Get Weird Tour received positive reviews. It also marked the first time that the group had performed to audiences across Europe, Oceania and Asia. The tour consisted of 60 sold out shows, selling over 411,421 tickets worldwide, and grossed over $25.7 million. In March 2016, Little Mix was awarded a plaque to commemorate them having the highest selling UK arena tour of 2016 at that time, selling over 300,000 tickets in the UK alone.

== Background ==
Little Mix released "Black Magic" as the lead single of their third studio album Get Weird in May 2015. On 17 July 2015, the group announced an extensive arena tour to commence in March 2016 in the United Kingdom and Ireland. 21 extra shows in the United Kingdom and Ireland were added due to high demand. In October 2015, the group announced dates in Oceania, making this the first time the group would headline a world tour. In December 2015, Asian dates were announced. In February 2016, further European dates were announced, including shows in Sweden, France and Spain. Gigs in Cologne and Milan were moved to bigger venues as a result of the high demand, as well as the extension of the UK tour. The tour started in March 2016 with Nathan Sykes, Jagmac and Joey Devries supporting in Europe and Jai Waetford supporting in Oceania. The Sam Willows were the support act in Asia and Philippa Hanna was the tour support in Europe, as well as the re-arranged Belfast gigs.

== Concert synopsis ==
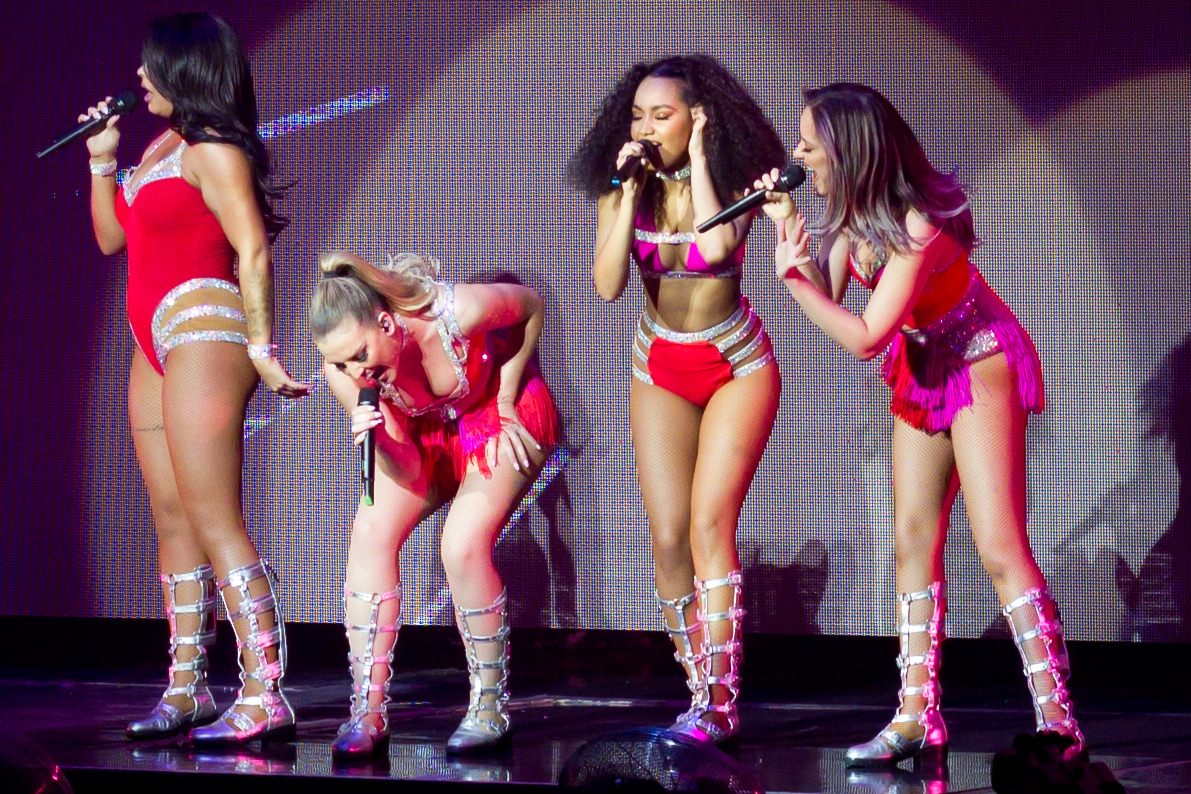
Little Mix performing "Wings" in Leeds

The show begins with a large screen showing fog rising. A book materializes, with sparks falling upon it. The book opens, flipping through the pages before landing on one. The right page lists the names of the group, while the camera zooms in on the blank left page. Sentences appear, alluding to the book calling the girls of band, with a background voice reading them out. The book fades, replaced by four hooded women who appear after each other and each say of name of one of the members. The screen abruptly cuts to black, before a man with black face paint stares into the audience. Suddenly, ominous music starts as sparks and fog fill the screen, with voices hissing. The screen rises to reveal the girls sitting on the floor in a circle, hands outstretched to each other. They then are flown up, and flail around as the man appears on the risen screen and says a phrase. The members are then lowered down as the lights are off. The same hooded women appear one after the other in a line whispering an incantation reminiscent of the lead single of the album, "Black Magic". The lights are switched on to reveal the girls standing up in brightly colored costumes before an intro. Right before the song begins, the background dancers rip off the pajamas, revealing the group in red and pink outfits and starting performing the sixth track on Get Weird, "Grown". It ends with extended dance breakdown making a transition to perform the next song placed on the setlist, "Hair". After the first interaction with fans, the group leads to perform "Change Your Life", following by "A.D.I.D.A.S." sitting on huge chairs whilst doing the choreography, and ending the first act with debut single, "Wings".

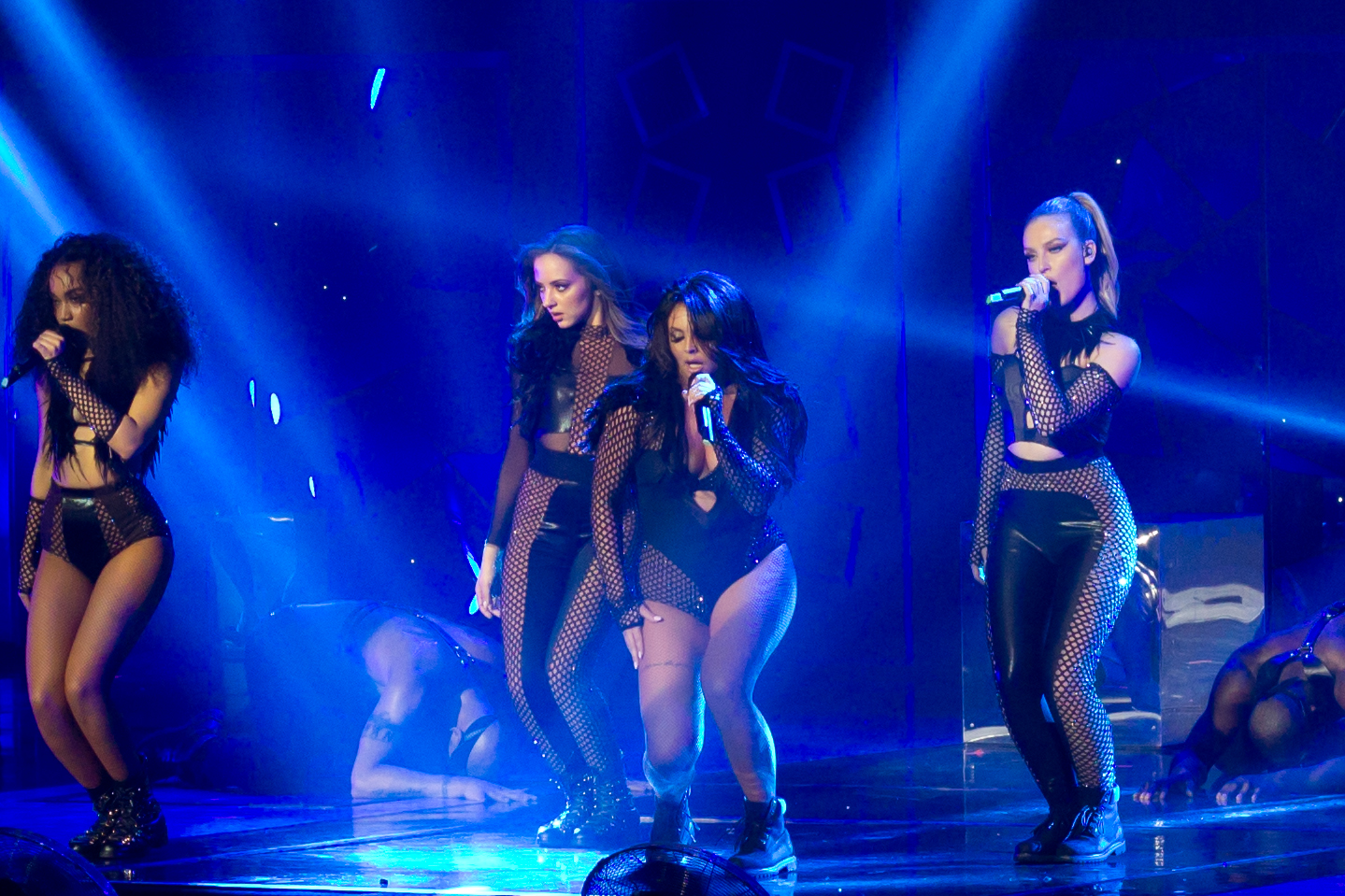
Pinnock, Thirlwall, Nelson and Edwards performing "Salute" on the tour in Leeds.

The second act of the show starts with the first interlude on the screen, showing the band getting into a taxi to head to a club. In the video they're asking the taxi driver to change the radio station and eventually changes into multiple song repertoire such as "Move", the lead single from group's second studio project, Salute, "OMG" or the third single from Get Weird, "Secret Love Song". Unfortunately the taxi car stops in the dark forest, that is scaring the members, then it drives away. The interlude introduces the group for the second time within starting first song from the next act, "Lightning" along with "DNA", which includes a Viennese waltz choreography at the beginning, and extended outro. After that, the members of the group are adding one detail to their current outfits, starts the second conversation with fans, and performs "Secret Love Song, Pt. II", a solo version of the track without the feature from Jason Derulo. It comes with a transition to eight song from Get Weird, "OMG" where the background dancers wear suits and huge bunny heads, resembling in half Miley Cyrus' "We Can't Stop" music video, where the singer is dancing with a giant, white bear on her back with others. After the performance of it, the girls are starting talking to fans for third time before performing a medley of multiple songs as "Apache (Jump on It)" by American hip hop group The Sugarhill Gang, "Crazy in Love" by American singer Beyoncé featuring American rapper Jay-Z, "Fester Skank" by English rapper Lethal Bizzle featuring Dutch electro producer Dizortion, the snippet of "Where Are Ü Now" by American EDM duo Jack Ü featuring Canadian singer Justin Bieber and "Ring the Alarm", second song from the medley by Beyoncé. The second act is ended by performance of two last singles from group's second studio album, Salute respectively, "Salute" and "Little Me" with additional ending, that contains the elements of "Lightning". During it, the backup dancers shield the girls with a cloak as the girls drop through the stage, giving the illusion of them disappearing when they are hidden with a cloak.

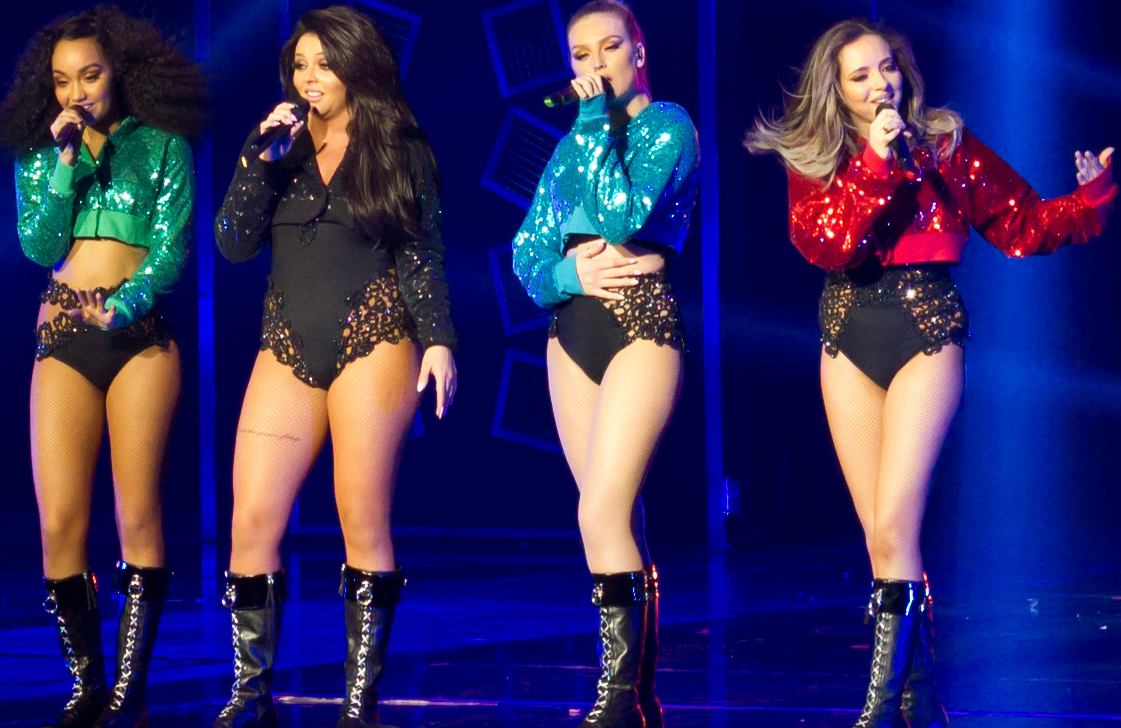
Little Mix performing "I Won't" in Leeds

Its third act of the show begins with second part of the interlude, where scared members of the group get back into taxi after frightening experience in the forest. Unexpectedly, the taxi driver is revealed to be a drag queen. To brighten up their makeup and hair fixing together, the driver plays the debut hit single by British girlgroup Spice Girls, "Wannabe" requested by Jade Thirlwall. When the girls are on the way to the venue, the video ends as the screen rises. Third act is introduced by performance of "Move" with an extended swing-esque intro, where the snaps and sultry vocals can be heard. Before starting the next song, "How Ya Doin'?" featuring American rapper Missy Elliott, the group shows their dance routine matched to the theme along with backup dancers, also the middle of the song is suddenly interrupted by a cover of "Hotline Bling" by Canadian rapper Drake. After that, the group sings the first track from deluxe version of Get Weird, "I Won't". By the end of it the screens falls down, the members are taking of their shirts to show off simple, glittery, black one pieces and perform second single from the album, "Love Me Like You" ending the third part of the gig.

The last act before the encore starts with the third interlude, where one of the band members, Jesy Nelson makes her own guide for audience how to do weird moves as the clip is set in a Hollywood's golden era style. When the screen rises, it reveals the group in colorful outfits and leads to perform "Weird People" within the background shows visuals of the formation dancing against a green screen background. Right before the song ends the members are moved down by a platform.

An encore begins with the last interlude starts with the band standing side by side and singing "The Beginning" in the back of golden lighting. After its ending, the girls start perform last song from a standard version of Get Weird, "The End" until the outfits are not revealed into white glittery black pieces. It makes a transition to perform "Black Magic", where its lyrics are shown in a big, black book, reminiscent of the song's official music video. Near the end, the group thanks the audience and leaps the back of stage.

== Critical reception ==
The Get Weird Tour was met with positive reviews from critics. Caroline Sullivan from at The Guardian, gave their performance a four out of five star rating. Hannah Britt from who attended one of their shows at The O_{2} Arena, in London, gave them a four star rating and commented "Last night the girls put on a proper pop show. Listening to their tight harmonies and powerful high notes, their vocals are allowed to shine during Secret Love Song and The End. Fun and feel-good, Little Mix are the Spice Girls for Generation Snapchat. Girl power continues".

Vicki Newman at the Shields Gazette who attended a show of theirs at the Metro Radio Arena in Newcastle commented "They were forced to defend their tour outfirs earlier this week with some saying they were too skimpy. But the girls are all in their 20s and have grown into confident, and successful women. The girls gave an energetic performance of fast-paced choreography without missing a single note."

The group also received positive reviews for the tour's first concert in the Motorpoint Arena in Cardiff. Lewis Corner of Digital Spy gave the concert four out of five stars, writing: "And for all the big spectacle, towering ad libs and swift costume changes, Little Mix never let the energy dip. 'This is a blimmin' hard show, innit?' says Leigh-Anne Pinnock, but you'd never consider it from the way they make it look so effortless." [...] "the only magic here is a combination of their pop brilliance and their ability to give it the big stage show it deserves – and it will most likely be the best one you'll see this year."

Rachel Mainwaring of Wales Online was very positive, giving the concert a rating of five-out-of-five-stars, declaring: "These girls can sing and these girls can dance. And everything about the show was loud, brash and positive."

== Accolade ==
Following Little Mix three sold out shows at the Metro Radio Arena in Newcastle, Little Mix was awarded a plaque in recognition for selling over 300,000 tickets. The group had the highest selling UK arena of 2016 at that time.

== The Get Weird Tour Live ==
The making of the Get Weird Tour DVD was confirmed by Jesy Nelson, who spoke with three other members of the group on KMFM on 15 April 2016. She revealed that their upcoming date at The SSE Arena, Wembley on 22 April 2016 will be filmed for the DVD, which was likely to be released later that year. The band announced that the DVD would come with the deluxe edition of their fourth studio album, Glory Days, released on 18 November 2016.

Get Weird – Deluxe edition DVD: The Get Weird Tour Live from The SSE Arena, Wembley
No.	Title	Length
1.	"Grown"	3:59
2.	"Hair"	5:47
3.	"Wings"	7:57
4.	"Lightning"	5:51
5.	"DNA"	6:13
6.	"Secret Love Song"	4:30
7.	"OMG"	5:36
8.	"Salute"	7:31
9.	"Little Me"	4:05
10.	"Move"	5:30
11.	"How Ya Doin'?"	4:12
12.	"Love Me Like You"	4:55
13.	"Weird People"	4:25
14.	"The Beginning"	3:25
15.	"Black Magic"	3:53
Total length:		77:49

== Set list ==
This set list was obtained from the concert of 13 March 2016 held at Motorpoint Arena in Cardiff. It does not represent all shows throughout the tour. Note that during the Oceania, Asia and Europe legs, "A.D.I.D.A.S.", "OMG" and "I Won't" was removed from the set list due to production being stripped back.

=== UK and Ireland leg ===
Act 1

1. "Grown" (contains elements of "Drop It Like It's Hot" and "Bang Bang")
2. "Hair"
3. "Change Your Life"
4. "A.D.I.D.A.S."
5. "Wings"

Act 2

6. "Lightning"
7. "DNA"
8. "Secret Love Song Pt.II"
9. "OMG"
10. Medley: "Apache (Jump on It)" / "Crazy in Love" / "Fester Skank" (contains elements of "Ring the Alarm" and "Where Are Ü Now")
11. "Salute"
12. "Little Me" (contains elements of "Lightning")

Act 3

13. "Move"
14. "How Ya Doin'?" (contains elements of "Hotline Bling")
15. "I Won't"

Act 4

16. "Love Me Like You"
17. "Weird People"

==== Encore ====
18. "The Beginning" (Interlude)
19. "The End"
20. "Black Magic"

=== Europe, Oceania and Asia leg ===
1. "Grown" (contains elements of "Drop It Like It's Hot" and "Bang Bang")
2. "Move"
3. "Hair"
4. "Change Your Life"
5. "Wings"
6. "Lightning"
7. "DNA"
8. "Secret Love Song Pt.II"
9. Medley: "Apache (Jump on It)" / "Crazy in Love" (contains elements of "Where Are Ü Now" and "Ring the Alarm")
10. "Salute"
11. "Little Me"
12. "How Ya Doin'?" (contains elements of "Hotline Bling")
13. "Love Me Like You"
14. "Weird People"

==== Encore ====
15. "The Beginning" (Interlude)
16. "The End"
17. "Black Magic"

== Tour dates ==
List of concerts, showing date, city, country, and venue.
Date	City	Country	Venue	Attendance	Revenue
Europe
13 March 2016	Cardiff	Wales	Motorpoint Arena Cardiff	9,634 / 9,866	$520,647
14 March 2016	Brighton	England	Brighton Centre	4,270 / 4,270	$189,063
15 March 2016	Bournemouth	England	Windsor Hall	—N/a	—N/a
17 March 2016	Newcastle	England	Metro Radio Arena	28,289 / 29,944	$1,456,597
18 March 2016	Birmingham	England	Genting Arena	12,229 / 13,819	$627,503
19 March 2016 (Note: The 19 March 2016 show at The SSE Hydro in Glasgow included a matinee and evening show.)	Glasgow	Scotland	SSE Hydro	21,700 / 21,700	$1,053,430
22 March 2016	Liverpool	England	Echo Arena	29,482 / 31,997	$1,512,194
23 March 2016	Nottingham	England	Motorpoint Arena Nottingham	15,685 / 18,479	$811,104
24 March 2016	Manchester	England	Manchester Arena	28,047 / 28,403	$1,394,470
26 March 2016	Leeds	England	First Direct Arena	22,325 /24,378	$1,139,993
27 March 2016 (Note: The 27 March 2016 show at The O2 Arena in London included a matinee and evening show.)	London	England	The O_{2} Arena	30,860 / 31,847	$1,621,100
28 March 2016	Cardiff	Wales	Motorpoint Arena	(Note: The boxscore data for 28 March 2016 is combined with the 13 March 2016 data.)	
30 March 2016	Dublin	Ireland	3Arena	17,709 / 18,265	$864,134
2 April 2016	Sheffield	England	Sheffield Arena	24,380 / 25,577	$1,234,548
3 April 2016 (Note: The 3 April 2016 in the Genting Arena in Birmingham includes a matinee and evening show.)	Birmingham	England	Genting Arena	25,099 / 27,758	$1,265,772
5 April 2016	Glasgow	Scotland	SSE Hydro	11,068 / 11,068	$527,738
7 April 2016	Manchester	England	Manchester Arena	(Note: The boxscore data for 7 April 2016 is combined with the 24 March 2016 data.)	
8 April 2016	Nottingham	England	Motorpoint Arena Nottingham	(Note: The boxscore data for 8 April 2016 is combined with the 23 March 2016 data.)	
9 April 2016	Newcastle	England	Metro Radio Arena	(Note: The boxscore data for 9 April 2016 is combined with the 17 March 2016 data.)	
11 April 2016	Aberdeen	Scotland	Oil & Gas Arena	9,849/ 9,560	$493,502
12 April 2016	Aberdeen	Scotland	Oil & Gas Arena	9,849/ 9,560	$493,502
14 April 2016	Liverpool	England	Echo Arena	(Note: The boxscore data for 14 April 2016 is combined with the 22 March 2016 data.)	
15 April 2016	Leeds	England	First Direct Arena	(Note: The boxscore data for 15 April 2016 is combined with the 26 March 2016 data.)	
16 April 2016	Newcastle	England	Metro Radio Arena	(Note: The boxscore data for 16 April 2016 is combined with the 17 March 2016 data.)	
18 April 2016	Dublin	Ireland	3Arena	(Note: The boxscore data for 18 April 2016 is combined with the 30 March 2016 data.)	
19 April 2016	Belfast	Northern Ireland	SSE Arena	17,952 / 17,952	$899,511
21 April 2016	Liverpool	England	Echo Arena	(Note: The boxscore data for 21 April 2016 is combined with the 22 March 2016 data.)	
22 April 2016	London	England	SSE Arena, Wembley	12,554 / 12,434	$578,370
23 April 2016	Sheffield	England	Sheffield Arena	(Note: The boxscore data for 23 April 2016 is combined with the 2 April 2016 data.)	
Oceania
12 May 2016	Brisbane	Australia	BCE Great Hall	3,252 / 3,372	$184,536
13 May 2016	Sydney	Australia	Qudos Bank Arena	5,867 / 7,096	$313,929
14 May 2016	Melbourne	Australia	Margaret Court Arena	6,355 / 6,355	$410,717
Asia
16 May 2016	Tokyo	Japan	Akasaka Blitz	1,400 / 1,400	$102,545
17 May 2016	Osaka	Japan	Big Cat	800 / 800	$58,597
18 May 2016	Nagoya	Japan	Diamond Hall	800 / 800	$55,887
20 May 2016	Quezon City	Philippines	Kia Theatre	2,301 / 2,301	$202,649
21 May 2016	Kuala Lumpur	Malaysia	KL Live at Life Centre	3,000 / 3,000	$148,620
23 May 2016	Singapore		The Star Performing Arts Centre	3,715 / 3,715	$241,475
Europe
12 June 2016	Stockholm	Sweden	Gröna Lund Tivoli	5,500 / 5,500	$88,000
13 June 2016	Oslo	Norway	Sentrum Scene	1,400 / 1,750	$58,689
14 June 2016	Copenhagen	Denmark	Falkoner Theater	2,400 / 3,000	$71,306
16 June 2016	Amsterdam	Netherlands	Heineken Music Hall	3,385 / 3,500	$135,767
17 June 2016	Antwerp	Belgium	Trix	1,100 / 1,100	$39,645
19 June 2016	Cologne	Germany	Palladium	4,240 / 4,240	$149,770
20 June 2016 (Note: The 20 June 2016 show in the Assago Summer Arena in Milan was originally due to take place in Fabrique but the venue was upgraded due to high demand. It is now part of the Street Music Art Festival)	Milan	Italy	Assago Summer Arena	5,000 / 5,000	$141,209
21 June 2016	Zürich	Switzerland	Volkshaus	1,850 / 1,850	$103,337
23 June 2016	Paris	France	Le Grand Rex	2,702 / 2,702	$106,134
24 June 2016	Barcelona	Spain	Razzmatazz	2,000 / 2,000	$69,022
25 June 2016	Madrid	Spain	La Riviera	1,800 / 1,800	$58,821
2 July 2016 (Note: The 2 July 2016 show at the SSE Arena in Belfast was originally scheduled to take place on 31 March 2016 but was rescheduled due to Jesy Nelson's ortopedical problems. The show includes a matinee and evening show.)	Belfast	Northern Ireland	SSE Arena	17,952 / 17,952	$1,799,511
3 July 2016 (Note: The 3 July 2016 show in Cork was a part of the Live at the Marquee festival.)	Cork	Ireland	The Marquee	—N/a	—N/a
4 July 2016 (Note: The 4 July 2016 show in Cork was a part of the Live at the Marquee festival.)	Cork	Ireland	The Marquee	—N/a	—N/a
20 August 2016 (Note: The 20 August 2016 show in Hylands Park in Chelmsford was a part of V Festival 2016)	Chelmsford	England	Hylands Park	—N/a	—N/a
21 August 2016 (Note: The 21 August 2016 show in Weston Park in Staffordshire was a part of V Festival 2016)	Staffordshire	England	Weston Park	—N/a	—N/a
27 August 2016	Newmarket	England	Newmarket Racecourse	—N/a	—N/a
