= Secret Love Song =

2016 single by Little Mix

Single by Little Mix featuring Jason Derulo

from the album Get Weird
- Released: 3 February 2016
- Recorded: 2015
- Studio: Poinsettia Place (Los Angeles); Blue Box Studios (London)
- Genre: Pop
- Length: 4:09
- Label: Syco; Columbia
- Songwriters: Jez Ashurst; Emma Rohan; Rachel Furner; Jason Desrouleaux
- Producer: Jayson DeZuzio

Little Mix singles chronology
"Love Me Like You" (2015)	"Secret Love Song" (2016)	"Hair" (2016)

Jason Derulo singles chronology
"Get Ugly" (2015)	"Secret Love Song" (2016)	"Hello Friday" (2016)

Music video
- "Secret Love Song" on YouTube

"Secret Love Song" is a song released by British girl group Little Mix, featuring guest vocals from American singer-songwriter Jason Derulo. It was released as the third single from the group's third studio album, Get Weird, by Syco Records and Columbia Records. The single was co-written by Derulo along with Jez Ashurst, Emma Rohan, and Tich. It is a slow ballad consisting of pounding bass and melancholic strings. It was met with mixed reviews from music critics, with some praising the group's vocal performances and its emotional depth, while others deemed it cheesy and overly sentimental, and criticized Derulo's involvement.

"Secret Love Song" is a pop-inspired ballad, with lyrics that is about unrequited and forbidden love, and has been interpreted in different ways, with Derulo's verse being about his personal experience of having a real-life affair. The song has come to be regarded as a gay anthem, and has been cited as helping people to deal with their own sexuality and feelings. The group have since dedicated "Secret Love Song" to the LGBTQ+ community, with a pride flag being displayed in the background after each performance.

On the UK Singles Chart, the song peaked at number six, becoming the group's eighth top-ten single in the country. It reached the top twenty of the charts within Australia, Ireland, New Zealand, and Lebanon. It has become one of the group's best-selling singles and one of the best-selling girl group singles in the United Kingdom. A second version of the single without Derulo, titled "Secret Love Song, Pt II", is included on the deluxe edition of Get Weird. The song received renewed attention in 2022 after becoming viral on the video-sharing social platform, TikTok.

== Background ==
In July 2015, Little Mix member Jesy Nelson stated that the group's third studio album, Get Weird, would have a song "that is possibly going to be a single that we've never done anything like before". Afterwards Perrie Edwards added: " And it may or may not have a feature...." "Secret Love Song", was written by Jez along with Ashurst, Emma Rohan, and Tich and produced by Jayson DeZuzio. The group sent the song to Jason Derulo who positively reacted to it, and later wrote his own verse. The recording stages for the song took place between at the Poinsettia Place in Los Angeles and at Blue Box Studios in London.

Derulo's decision to collaborate with the group came after Hit 30 presenters Angus O'Loughlin and Ash London played him the group's cover of his 2015 single "Want to Want Me" for BBC Radio 1's Live Lounge in July 2015. He reacted to it positively and said he understood why the cover had become a viral video. Group member Jade Thirlwall felt the song's slow tempo was "a nice change" for Derulo and "[showed] his voice off a lot". A piano-driven solo sequel of the song, "Secret Love Song Pt. II", was included on the deluxe version of Get Weird.

== Composition and lyrics ==
"Secret Love Song"
A 21-second sample of "Secret Love Song " with Edwards singing the first chorus featuring a pounding bass and melancholic strings.

"Secret Love Song" is a slow, pop ballad. It consists of a pounding bass and melancholic strings. Derulo's vocal uses vibrato and auto-tune, as he sings the song's second verse. Nelson sings the high note during its bridge.

Lyrically, "Secret Love Song" details unrequited and forbidden love. Edwards said the lyrics are about "being with someone and you want to scream it from the rooftops but you have to hold it in". According to Derulo, his verse serves as a "twist" in the song, discussing his personal experience of having an affair: "I told a true story about this girl that I am really into but she has a boyfriend but we still do our thing." Some commentators have interpreted the song as representing the struggles of LGBT couples who cannot display affection in public and has been referred to as an unintentional gay anthem by fans of the group. This sentiment was shared by Jade Thirlwall who reacted positively to gay fans of the group interpreting that message in the song. The song has also been cited as helping people to deal with their own sexuality and feelings.

== Release ==
The group revealed the song's title on 7 September 2015, on Instagram. On 13 October 2015, they announced Derulo's involvement on Twitter, ahead of Get Weird's release the following month. The song was first made available as part of the album when Get Weird was released on 6 November 2015. On 5 December 2015, Little Mix confirmed on Twitter that "Secret Love Song" would be the third single from the album in the UK and Ireland. They unveiled the single's cover art on Instagram on 8 January 2016.

== Reception ==
=== Critical response ===
"Secret Love Song" has received mixed reviews from music critics. Popjustice wrote that the song would be better without Derulo, but called it "a big ballad" with an "amazing" chorus and gave it a rating of seven out of ten. Brad O'Mance from the website disliked Derulo's "dulcet/song-ruining tones". Lewis Corner of Digital Spy said the group matured emotionally on the track and described it as a "sweeping slowie [...] that soars highest on the perfectly polished chorus".

Cameron Adams of the Herald Sun described the song as "uber cheese". Harriet Gibsone from The Guardian viewed the song as one of Get Weird's "odd moments of mediocrity". Chuck Campbell of the Knoxville News Sentinel felt the song tried too hard. Nick Levine from NME regarded the song as "melodramatic" and "not as entertaining" as the rest of the album. Ludovic Hunter-Tilney of the Financial Times said: "Their manufactured origins surface on 'Secret Love Song', a by-the-numbers ballad watermarked with [Simon] Cowell's foreboding features." Andy Gill of The Independent criticised Derulo's "ghastly, tremulous vibrato" on the track, calling it "by far, the worst [irritation]" on Get Weird. Matthew Horton of Virgin Media opined that "Secret Love Song" failed to help the album "catch fire", dismissing it as "syrupy" and "an unrequired duet".

=== Chart performance ===
"Secret Love Song" debuted at number 66 on the UK Singles Chart on 8 January 2016, selling 8,635 units. The following week, it sold 14,964 units and rose to number 34. It peaked at number six, making it their eighth top-ten single. On 1 April 2016, the song was certified gold in the UK for selling over 400,000 copies. The song peaked at number 16 in Australia and has been certified double platinum for selling over 140,000 copies. The song has since become one of the group's best selling singles to date and one of the best-selling girl group singles in the United Kingdom between 1994 and 2019.

== Music video ==
The accompanying music video for "Secret Love Song" was directed by Frank Borin. and was filmed at London Bridge and Tower Bridge. The music video was originally set to feature a same sex couple, a straight couple and an interracial couple. Thirlwall previously revealed on Twitter on 5 November 2015 that the group pictured the video to depict the struggles of an LGBT couple. Stomp Models required the couples to be relatable and emotional with "a cool or hip factor", and to act with a sense of longing and fulfilment. Thirlwall previously mentioned that the music video is "very different" from the group's previous visuals.

When the video was released on 3 February 2016, six days later than expected, all the scenes featuring the same sex couple, the opposite sex couple and the interracial couple had been removed from the final cut which featured only connected scenes of the singers appearing solo and isolated from each other during the singing of the song. On its release, only British fans could access the video, before worldwide viewing was enabled a few days later. Thirlwall later expressed her annoyance at Syco for scrapping the LGBT narrative-led storylines from the final cut of the video.

== Live performances ==
Little Mix and Derulo performed "Secret Love Song" for the first time live as part of their set-list at Capital's Jingle Bell Ball on 5 December 2015. They opened with "Salute" which was followed by "Move" and "Love Me Like You". Prior to singing "Secret Love Song", Little Mix introduced the track and said "We have an exclusive for you. We know you'll enjoy a cheeky little surprise. This song is going to be our next single. We hope you enjoy it." They concluded with "Wings" and "Black Magic". In 2016 they joined Derulo on his 2016 arena tour at The O_{2} Arena on 5 February 2016 to perform "Secret Love Song".

On 12 February, Little Mix and Derulo performed the song on The Graham Norton Show. The group also performed the solo version regularly during The Get Weird Tour (2016), The Glory Days Tour (2017), as the support act for Ariana Grande's Dangerous Woman Tour the same year, the Summer Hits Tour (2018), LM5: The Tour (2019), and The Confetti Tour (2022). On The Get Weird Tour in 2016, the group dedicated the song to the Orlando nightclub Victims after a mass shooting took place at a gay nightclub in Orlando, Florida. In 2018, the group performed the song during a show in Dubai while displaying a rainbow flag; homosexuality is illegal in the UAE. On 7 November 2020, Little Mix performed the second part of the song during the final of Little Mix The Search.

== Cover versions ==
- In 2016, Morissette released a cover version of the song on "Wish 107.5 Bus". In 2018, the cover become the channel's most watched video with over 75 million views as of 2018. As of March 2022, it has over 180 million views. She performed the song again when she represented her country at the Asia Song Festival in 2017.
- In 2017, Yoohyeon from the South Korean girl group Dreamcatcher covered the song.

== Credits and personnel ==
- Jez Ashurst – writer
- Emma Rohan – writer
- Rachel Furner – writer
- Jason Desrouleaux – writer
- Jayson DeZuzio – producer, engineering, all instruments and programming
- Maegan Cottone – vocal producer
- Phil Tan – mixing
- Sam Ellison – assistant vocal producer

Credits adapted from the album's liner notes.

== Charts ==
=== Weekly charts ===
Chart (2016–2022)	Peak position
Australia (ARIA)	16
Euro Digital Songs (Billboard)	7
Indonesia (Billboard)	25
Ireland (IRMA)	11
Lebanon (Lebanese Top 20)	14
Mexico Ingles Airplay (Billboard)	5
New Zealand (Recorded Music NZ)	18
Poland Airplay (ZPAV)	62
Scottish Singles Sales (Official Charts)	3
UK Singles (Official Charts)	6

2022 weekly chart performance for "Secret Love Song"
Chart (2022)	Peak position
Indonesia (Billboard)	25

=== Year-end charts ===
Chart (2016)	Position
Australia (ARIA)	60
UK Singles (Official Charts Company)	41

== Certifications ==
Region	Certification	Certified units/sales
Australia (ARIA)	2× Platinum	140,000^{‡}
Brazil (Pro-Música Brasil)	Platinum	60,000^{‡}
Denmark (IFPI Danmark)	Platinum	90,000^{‡}
Ireland (IRMA)	Platinum	15,000^{^}
New Zealand (RMNZ)	3× Platinum	90,000^{‡}
Poland (ZPAV)	Gold	25,000^{‡}
United Kingdom (BPI)	3× Platinum	1,800,000
^{^} Shipments figures based on certification alone.^{‡} Sales+streaming figures based on certification alone.

== Accolade ==
List of awards and nominations for "Secret Love Song"
Year	Award ceremony	Category	Result	Ref.
2016	2016 Teen Choice Awards	Music Love Song	Nominated	
