= Salute Tour =

2014 concert tour by Little Mix

- Continental tour by Little Mix
- Promotional poster for the tour
- Location: Europe
- Associated album: Salute
- Start date: 16 May 2014
- End date: 27 July 2014
- Legs: 1
- No. of shows: 20
- Box office: $10.6 million

Little Mix concert chronology
- DNA Tour (2013); Salute Tour (2014); The Get Weird Tour (2016)

The Salute Tour was the second concert tour held by British girl group Little Mix, in support of their second studio album, Salute. The tour began on 16 May 2014, in Birmingham, England, and ended on 27 July 2014 in Scarborough, North Yorkshire, England.

The Salute Tour marked the first time that the group would headlined arenas on selected dates. The tour consisted of 20 sold-out shows across the United Kingdom and Ireland and grossed over $10.6 million. The group was also scheduled to expand their tour in North America starting in Boca Raton, Florida and would conclude in Toronto, Canada. However, in July 2014, the North American leg of the tour was later cancelled so the group could work on their third album.

== Background ==
The tour was officially announced on 2 December 2013 through the band's Twitter and tickets were available starting 6 December 2013.

Due to overwhelming demand, second dates were added at the Glasgow Clyde Auditorium and the Cardiff Motorpoint Arena in December 2013. Also, due to exceptional public demand, the Manchester venue was upgraded from the O2 Apollo Manchester to the Manchester Arena. The Nottingham show was also relocated from the Nottingham Royal Concert Hall on 5 June, to the Capital FM Arena on 28 May.

A North America leg of the tour was announced on 21 April 2014, with general public tickets going on sale 26 April 2014 and pre sale beginning 23 April 2014.

On 4 July 2014, Little Mix released a statement on their website, indicating the cancellation of the then-upcoming North American leg of the tour, due to wanting to be in the process of the creation of their third album.

== Supporting acts ==
- M.O (UK and Ireland)
- HRVY (UK and Ireland)
- NVS (UK and Ireland)

== Setlist ==
Act 1

1. "Salute"
2. "Nothing Feels Like You"
3. "About The Boy"
4. "Change Your Life"
5. "Dark Horse" (Katy Perry cover)

Act 2

6. "A Different Beat"
7. "How Ya Doin'?"
8. "Mr Loverboy"
9. "Boy"
10. "Towers"
11. "Competition"
12. "Word Up!"

Act 3

13. "DNA"
14. "Stand Down"
15. "Talk Dirty / Can't Hold Us" (contains excerpts of "Niggas in Paris" and "Run the World (Girls)")
16. "Little Me"
17. "Move"

Encore

18. "Good Enough"
19. "Wings"

== Tour dates ==
Date	City	Country	Venue	Attendance	Box Office
United Kingdom and Ireland
16 May 2014	Birmingham	England	LG Arena	15,700 / 15,700	$589,514
17 May 2014	Newcastle	England	Metro Radio Arena	11,000 / 11,000	$373,874
19 May 2014	Edinburgh	Scotland	Usher Hall	2,200 / 2,200	$171,031
20 May 2014	Glasgow	Scotland	Clyde Auditorium	6,600 / 6,600	$753,824
21 May 2014	Glasgow	Scotland	Clyde Auditorium	6,600 / 6,600	$753,824
23 May 2014	Liverpool	England	Echo Arena Liverpool	11,000 / 11,000	$370,043
24 May 2014	Sheffield	England	Motorpoint Arena Sheffield	13,500 / 13,500	$986,660
25 May 2014	London	England	The O_{2} Arena	20,000 / 20,000	$1,772,257
27 May 2014	Manchester	England	Phones 4u Arena	14,060 / 14,060	$1,549,746
28 May 2014	Nottingham	England	Capital FM Arena	10,000 / 10,000	$887,302
30 May 2014	Plymouth	England	Plymouth Pavilions	4,000 / 4,000	$201,113
31 May 2014	Cardiff	Wales	Motorpoint Arena Cardiff	7,500 / 7,500	$388,488
2 June 2014	Blackpool	England	Blackpool Opera House	2,920/ 2,920	$109,560
4 June 2014	Bournemouth	England	Windsor Hall	6,500 / 6,500	$254,150
5 June 2014	Cardiff	Wales	Motorpoint Arena Cardiff	7,500 / 7,500	$403,787
6 June 2014	Brighton	England	Brighton Centre	3,762 / 3,762	$147,094
8 June 2014	Dublin	Ireland	The O2, Dublin	9,500 / 9,500	$684,934
9 June 2014	Belfast	Northern Ireland	Odyssey Arena	11,058 / 11,058	$1,379,001
26 July 2014	Isle of Wight	England	Osborne House	—N/a	—N/a
27 July 2014	Scarborough	England	Scarborough Open Air Theatre	—N/a	—N/a
TOTAL				370,058 /370,058 (100%)	$8,625,466

== Cancelled shows ==
List of cancelled concerts, showing date, city, country, venue, and reason for cancellation
Date	City	Country	Venue	Reason
10 September 2014	Boca Raton	United States	Mizner Park Amphitheater	Recording third studio album, Get Weird
12 September 2014	Orlando	United States	House of Blues	Recording third studio album, Get Weird
13 September 2014	Atlanta	United States	Aaron's Amphitheatre at Lakewood	Recording third studio album, Get Weird
14 September 2014	Nashville	United States	Ryman Auditorium	Recording third studio album, Get Weird
16 September 2014	Grand Prairie	United States	Verizon Theatre at Grand Prairie	Recording third studio album, Get Weird
17 September 2014	The Woodlands	United States	Cynthia Woods Mitchell Pavilion	Recording third studio album, Get Weird
19 September 2014	Phoenix	United States	Ak-Chin Pavilion	Recording third studio album, Get Weird
22 September 2014	Los Angeles	United States	Hollywood Bowl	Recording third studio album, Get Weird
23 September 2014	San Jose	United States	City National Civic	Recording third studio album, Get Weird
26 September 2014	St. Louis	United States	The Muny	Recording third studio album, Get Weird
27 September 2014	Rosemont	United States	Rosemont Theatre	Recording third studio album, Get Weird
28 September 2014	Detroit	United States	The Fillmore Detroit	Recording third studio album, Get Weird
30 September 2014	Charlotte	United States	PNC Music Pavilion	Recording third studio album, Get Weird
2 October 2014	Montclair	United States	Wellmont Theatre	Recording third studio album, Get Weird
3 October 2014	New York City	United States	JBL Live at Pier 97	Recording third studio album, Get Weird
4 October 2014	Wallingford	United States	Toyota Oakdale Theatre	Recording third studio album, Get Weird
6 October 2014	Boston	United States	Blue Hills Bank Pavilion	Recording third studio album, Get Weird
8 October 2014	Upper Darby Township	United States	Tower Theater	Recording third studio album, Get Weird
9 October 2014	Silver Spring	United States	The Fillmore Silver Spring	Recording third studio album, Get Weird
11 October 2014	Toronto	Canada	Sound Academy	Recording third studio album, Get Weird
