= Salute (Little Mix album) =

Studio album by Little Mix
- Released: 8 November 2013
- Recorded: 2013
- Studio: The Boom Boom Room (Burbank, California); The Hide Out Studios (London, United Kingdom)
- Genre: Pop; R&B
- Length: 43:06
- Language: English; French
- Label: Syco; Columbia
- Producer: TMS; Future Cut; Fred Ball; MNEK; Nathan Duvall; Electric; Ash Howes; Richard "Biff" Stannard; RyKeyz; Nicky D'Silva

Little Mix chronology
DNA (2012)	Salute (2013)	Get Weird (2015)

Singles from Salute
- 1. "Move" Released: 7 October 2013; 2. "Little Me" Released: 30 December 2013; 3. "Salute" Released: 3 May 2014

Salute is the second studio album by British girl group Little Mix, released on 8 November 2013 through Syco Music and Columbia Records. The album was mostly co-written by Little Mix, who stated that they were more involved in the development of this album compared to their debut album DNA. The album was preceded by the lead single "Move", and included two further singles, "Little Me", and "Salute".

Musically, the album sees Little Mix approach a more R&B-influenced sound while retaining their previous pop sound of their debut album. Salute also sees the quartet experiment more with 90s production sounds, with elements of hip-hop, teen-pop, and electronic dance music influences from the 2000s. The album contains lyrics focused on themes such as girl power, mental health, self-love, breakups, insecurity, and female empowerment.

The album received generally positive reviews from critics, with some praising the group for their vocal harmonies. Salute charted in nineteen music markets, including reaching the top ten in the United Kingdom, Canada, Australia, Ireland, and the USA. It was named as one of the best-selling girl group albums in the UK between 1994 and 2019. To promote the album, the group embarked on The Salute Tour in 2014. A planned North American leg was cancelled as the group opted instead to work on their next album, Get Weird.

== Background ==
In an interview with Digital Spy in March 2013, Little Mix stated that they wanted their second album to have a more R&B sound. Group member Jesy Nelson added: "I personally want to put a lot more dancey stuff in there. As in, one of the songs that comes on in a club that makes you want to dance. Not that David Guetta sound, but more R&B – a bit like Eve and Gwen Stefani's "Let Me Blow Ya Mind"." They also revealed that they would be starting to write material for the new album in the coming months. On 19 September 2013, Little Mix held a livestream to announce that they had finished recording their second album and it was going to be sent to be mixed. In the same livestream the girls announced that the first single "Move" would be premiered on radio on 23 September. They also sang an a cappella version of "Little Me".

== Release and promotion ==
On 4 October, Little Mix uploaded a video to their official YouTube page, announcing that their second album would be called Salute and would be available for pre-order on 7 October. The album was released in the UK on 11 November 2013 and released in the US on 4 February 2014.

The group sang "Move" for the first time live at Wembley Stadium on 9 October for Big Gig 2013 for the Girlguiding organisation. On 20 October, Little Mix travelled to Australia, where they performed the songs "Wings", "DNA" and "Change Your Life" at an autograph signing. Little Mix performed "Move" on The X Factor Australia on 21 October 2013 and on the morning show Sunrise. They also sang it on The X Factor UK on 3 November 2013. They also performed it on The X Factor USA on 5 December 2013 and The Wendy Williams Show on 6 February 2014 as well as the Late Show with David Letterman.

The album's lead single, "Move", made its radio premiere on 23 September 2013 and was released on 3 November 2013. It charted at number three on the UK Singles Chart and number five on the Irish Singles Chart. Follow-up singles "Little Me" and the title track peaked at number 14 and number six, respectively, in the UK. In December 2013, the group announced their second headlining concert tour, The Salute Tour, scheduled to take place between May and July 2014 in support of the album. A North American extension of this tour was scheduled for September and October but was later cancelled due to the process of recording their next album.

On 21 August 2020, two new versions of the album were made available for download and streaming: an expanded edition of the album, which replaced the deluxe edition on Spotify and other streaming platforms, and one that included rarities and remixes of songs from the album.

== Singles ==
On 23 September 2013, "Move" premiered on BBC Radio 1. For the single, Little Mix worked with R&B producer Nathan Duvall and Maegan Cottone, the girls' vocal coach. "Move" was released on 7 October in Australia and New Zealand. It was released in the UK and Ireland on 3 November. It was sent to mainstream radio in the US on 18 February 2014 and reached number 38 on that chart. The song peaked at number three in the UK, number five in Ireland, number 19 in Japan and number 12 in New Zealand. The single also charted in Australia, Belgium, the Netherlands and Slovakia. "Move" has been certified gold in Australia and the UK for sales of 35,000 and 400,000, respectively.

"Little Me" was selected as the second single from the album. The song was co-written by TMS and Iain James and produced by TMS. On 21 November 2013, Little Mix revealed via a YouTube video message that they had decided to release it as the second single because it held a lot of meaning to them and was written with their fans in mind. The song reached number fourteen in the UK, number three in Armenia, number fifteen in Iceland and number 16 in the Netherlands. It also charted in Australia, Ireland and Lebanon.

After releasing a cover of "Word Up!" in March 2014 as the charity single for Sport Relief, Little Mix announced on 5 April 2014 that the title track "Salute" would be released as the album's third single. It was sent to UK radio on 28 April 2014. The official music video premiered on 2 May and received over one million views within 24 hours. The single was released on 1 June and peaked at number six in the UK, number five in Scotland and number 12 in Ireland.

=== Promotional singles ===
The album was supported by five promotional singles. On 9 January 2014 the first two promotional singles released from Salute were "These Four Walls" which peaked at number fifty-seven on the UK Singles Charts, and "Nothing Feels Like You". On 21 January 2014, the third, fourth, and fifth promotional singles released were "Towers", "Stand Down" and "See Me Now". Towers was included in the 2021, After We Fell movie soundtrack.

== Critical reception ==
Professional ratings
Aggregate scores
Source	Rating
AnyDecentMusic?	6.5/10
Metacritic	66/100
Review scores
Source	Rating
AllMusic	3.5/5 stars
Digital Spy	5/5 stars
Evening Standard	3/5 stars
The Guardian	4/5 stars
Los Angeles Times	1.5/4 stars
musicOMH	3.5/5 stars
The Observer	3/5 stars

Salute received generally positive reviews from music critics. At Metacritic, which assigns a normalised rating out of 100 to reviews from mainstream critics, the album received an average score of 66, based on five reviews, which indicates "generally favourable reviews".

Lewis Corner of Digital Spy gave the album five out of five stars, noting an improvement over DNA (2012), stating, "the group have grown both musically and in confidence, paving the way for them to step out on to that world stage once again and really make their mark", while drawing comparisons to American girl group Destiny's Child. Jon OBrien of Yahoo! wrote that the album cemented Little Mix's status as music's premier girlband while characterising the album as "impressively mature yet still utterly infectious". Harriet Gibsone from The Guardian compared the album to pop music of the 1990s, awarding the album four out of five stars. New. Fresh. Hype. praises this album for the tight vocal harmonies and writing, scoring them 9. They also praised the production of this album, making them sound stronger and slicker. New. Fresh. Hype. scored the overall album 8.2. MSN gave the album five stars out of five recommending the tracks "Salute", "Move", "Boy", "Good Enough" and the rest of the album. Renowned for Sound commented that on the album, the group's vocals "are on top form and still gelling nicely together, even sounding better and more technical in many areas".

Spin included the album in their "20 Best Pop Albums of 2013" year-end list.

== Commercial performance ==
In the UK, Salute charted at number four, becoming Little Mix's second consecutive top five album. It was named as one of the biggest-selling albums in the UK between 2013 and 2014 and as of May 2022, it has sold over 429,000 copies. It has been ranked as one of the biggest-selling girl group albums between 1994 and 2019.

On the US Billboard 200, Salute debuted at number six, selling over 43,000 copies in its first week, becoming the group's second consecutive top ten studio album in the country. The album also reached the top ten on the Canadian, Australian, Irish and Scottish album charts. Salute charted in thirteen other countries, including reaching the top twenty in Croatia, New Zealand, Norway, and Spain.

== Track listing ==
Salute
No.	Title	Writer(s)	Producer(s)	Length
1.	"Salute"	Thomas Barnes; Peter Kelleher; Ben Kohn; Maegan Cottone; Perrie Edwards; Jesy Nelson; Leigh-Anne Pinnock; Jade Thirlwall	TMS	3:56
2.	"Move"	Nathan Duvall; Cottone; Edwards; Nelson; Pinnock; Thirlwall	Duvall	3:44
3.	"Little Me"	Barnes; Kelleher; Kohn; Iain James; Edwards; Nelson; Pinnock; Thirlwall	TMS	3:55
4.	"Nothing Feels like You"	Uzoechi Emenike; Camille Purcell; Edwards; Nelson; Pinnock; Thirlwall	MNEK	3:27
5.	"Towers"	Jamie Scott; Little Nikki; Edvard Førre Erfjord; Henrik Michelsen	Electric	3:58
6.	"Competition"	Barnes; Kelleher; Kohn; James; Cottone; Edwards; Nelson; Pinnock; Thirlwall	TMS	3:27
7.	"These Four Walls"	Richard "Biff" Stannard; Ash Howes; Bradford Ellis; Shaznay Lewis; Edwards; Nelson; Pinnock; Thirlwall	Stannard; Howes	3:28
8.	"About the Boy"	Barnes; Kelleher; Kohn; Lewis; Edwards; Nelson; Pinnock; Thirlwall	TMS	3:44
9.	"Boy"	Purcell; Rick Parkhouse; George Tizzard	Fred Ball	2:54
10.	"Good Enough"	Barnes; Kelleher; Kohn; Purcell; Edwards; Nelson; Pinnock; Thirlwall	TMS	3:52
11.	"Mr Loverboy"	Ryan Williamson (RyKeyz); Jordan Dollar	RyKeyz	3:14
12.	"A Different Beat"	Barnes; Kelleher; Kohn; James; Ayak Thiik; Edwards; Nelson; Pinnock; Thirlwall	TMS; Nicky D'Silva (add.)	3:27
Total length:				43:06

UK / US deluxe edition bonus disc and European bonus tracks
No.	Title	Writer(s)	Producer(s)	Length
13.	"See Me Now"	Ball; James; Nicola Roberts	Ball	3:43
14.	"They Just Don't Know You"	Ball; Roberts; James; Edwards; Nelson; Pinnock; Thirlwall	Ball	3:55
15.	"Stand Down"	Darren Lewis; Iyiola Babalola; Lewis; Edwards; Nelson; Pinnock; Thirlwall	Future Cut	3:39
16.	"Little Me" (Unplugged)	Barnes; Kelleher; Kohn; James; Edwards; Nelson; Pinnock; Thirlwall		3:56
Total length:				58:19

French bonus track
No.	Title	Writer(s)	Producer(s)	Length
17.	"Une Autre Personne" (Tal with Little Mix)	Tal; Ralph Beaubrum; Dalvin; Tiery-F	Gary Fico; Tiery-F	4:01
Total length:				62:20

Japanese bonus tracks
No.	Title	Writer(s)	Producer(s)	Length
17.	"Move" (Deekly And Eightysix Remix)	Nathan Duvall; Cottone; Edwards; Nelson; Pinnock; Thirlwall	Deekly And Eightysix	3:21
18.	"Move" (Over Exposure Remix)	Nathan Duvall; Cottone; Edwards; Nelson; Pinnock; Thirlwall	Over Exposure	5:53
19.	"Move" (The Alias Radio Edit)	Nathan Duvall; Cottone; Edwards; Nelson; Pinnock; Thirlwall	The Alias; J. Gingell; B. Stone; Pete Hofmann	3:46
20.	"Wings" (Japanese Version)	Barnes; Kelleher; Kohn; James; Little Mix; Erika Nuri; Michelle Lewis; Mischke; Heidi Rojas; Junji Ishiwatari	TMS	3:42
Total length:				75:01

2020 digital expanded edition
No.	Title	Writer(s)	Producer(s)	Length
4.	"Word Up!"	Tomi Jenkins; Larry Blackmon	Cottone TMS	3:28
18.	"Move" (The Alias Radio Edit)	Duvall; Cottone; Edwards; Nelson; Pinnock; Thirlwall	The Alias; J. Gingell; B. Stone; Pete Hofmann	3:46
19.	"Little Me" (DE$iGNATED Radio Remix)	Barnes; Kelleher; Kohn; James; Edwards; Nelson; Pinnock; Thirlwall		3:48
20.	"Word Up!" (The Alias Radio Edit)	Jenkins; Blackmon		3:28
21.	"Salute" (Single Version)	Barnes; Kelleher; Kohn; Cottone; Edwards; Nelson; Pinnock; Thirlwall	TMS	3:08
Total length:				76:00

Salute - Rarities & Remixes
No.	Title	Writer(s)	Length
1.	"Salute" (Troyboi Remix)	Barnes; Kelleher; Kohn; Cottone; Edwards; Nelson; Pinnock; Thirlwall	3:36
2.	"Salute" (Anakyan Remix)	Barnes; Kelleher; Kohn; Cottone; Edwards; Nelson; Pinnock; Thirlwall	5:12
3.	"Word Up!" (Extended Mix)	Jenkins; Blackmon	5:00
4.	"Move" (Deekly and Eightysix Remix)	Duvall; Cottone; Edwards; Nelson; Pinnock; Thirlwall	3:19
5.	"Move" (Mike Delinquent Remix)	Duvall; Cottone; Edwards; Nelson; Pinnock; Thirlwall	5:19
6.	"Move" (Mike Rizzo Funk Generation Radio Mix)	Duvall; Cottone; Edwards; Nelson; Pinnock; Thirlwall	3:43
7.	"Move" (Over Exposure Remix)	Duvall; Cottone; Edwards; Nelson; Pinnock; Thirlwall	5:51
8.	"Move" (Acoustic) (Live)	Duvall; Cottone; Edwards; Nelson; Pinnock; Thirlwall	2:57
9.	"Who's Lovin You" (Live)	William "Smokey" Robinson	1:08
Total length:			36:19

== Charts ==
=== Weekly charts ===
Chart (2013)	Peak position
Australian Albums (ARIA)	4
Austrian Albums (Ö3 Austria)	26
Belgian Albums (Ultratop Flanders)	56
Belgian Albums (Ultratop Wallonia)	80
Canadian Albums (Billboard)	7
Croatian International Albums (HDU)	20
Czech Albums (ČNS IFPI)	46
Danish Albums (Hitlisten)	25
Dutch Albums (Album Top 100)	49
Finnish Albums (Suomen virallinen lista)	50
French Albums (SNEP)	32
German Albums (Offizielle Top 100)	90
Greek Albums (IFPI)	14
Irish Albums (IRMA)	7
Italian Albums (FIMI)	21
Japanese Albums (Oricon)	16
New Zealand Albums (RMNZ)	11
Norwegian Albums (VG-lista)	19
Portuguese Albums (AFP)	16
Scottish Albums (OCC)	5
Spanish Albums (Promusicae)	17
Swiss Albums (Schweizer Hitparade)	53
South Korean International Albums (Circle)	10
UK Albums (OCC)	4
UK Album Downloads (OCC)	4
US Billboard 200	6

=== Year-end charts ===
Chart (2013)	Position
UK Albums (OCC)	45
Chart (2014)	Position
UK Albums (OCC)	84

== Certifications ==
Region	Certification	Certified units/sales
Brazil (Pro-Música Brasil)	Gold	20,000^{‡}
New Zealand (RMNZ)	Gold	7,500^{‡}
United Kingdom (BPI)	Platinum	445,000
United States	—	43,000
^{‡} Sales+streaming figures based on certification alone.

== Release history ==
Regions	Date	Format(s)	Label
Ireland	8 November 2013	CD; digital download	Syco Music
Poland	8 November 2013	CD; digital download	Syco Music
United Kingdom	11 November 2013	CD; digital download	Syco Music
Italy	12 November 2013	CD; digital download	Syco Music
Australia	15 November 2013	CD; digital download	Sony Music Australia
New Zealand	15 November 2013	CD; digital download	Syco Music
United States	4 February 2014	CD; digital download	Columbia Records
