= Salute (song) =

2014 single by Little Mix

Single by Little Mix

from the album Salute
- Released: 3 May 2014
- Recorded: 2013
- Genre: Pop; R&B; hip hop; trap
- Length: 3:56 (album version); 3:07 (single version)
- Label: Syco
- Songwriters: Thomas Barnes; Peter Kelleher; Ben Kohn; Maegan Cottone; Perrie Edwards; Jesy Nelson; Leigh-Anne Pinnock; Jade Thirlwall
- Producer: TMS

Little Mix singles chronology
"Word Up!" (2014)	"Salute" (2014)	"Black Magic" (2015)

Music video
- "Salute" on YouTube

"Salute" is a song recorded by British girl group Little Mix for their second studio album of the same name (2013). It was released on 3 May 2014 as the album's third and final single. It was co-written by the group (Perrie Edwards, Leigh-Anne Pinnock, Jesy Nelson and Jade Thirlwall) alongside TMS (Thomas Barnes, Peter Kelleher and Ben Kohn) and Maegan Cottone, and produced by TMS. Lyrically, "Salute" is described as a girl-power song, with military metaphors and war sirens, drawing comparisons to Destiny's Child and Beyoncé's "Run the World (Girls)".

Music critics gave the song positive reviews, praising it for its empowering lyrics and military-inspired drum beats. Some even noticed it would fit perfectly as an opening song for the tour, as well as being one of the most elite tracks of 2013. The song became a top-ten hit the United Kingdom, becoming the group's sixth top-ten single in the UK, while reaching the top-twenty in Ireland. To promote the song, the group performed for many TV shows, including Britain's Got Talent and on the Today show.

== Background and release ==
After winning the eighth series of The X Factor UK, British girl-group Little Mix released their debut album, DNA, in November 2012. The album received generally favorable reviews from music critics, while also being a success on the charts, besides spawning the number-one single "Wings", as well as the top-three hit "DNA" and the top-twenty singles "Change Your Life" and "How Ya Doin'?". A few months later, the group stated that they were working on a new album, stating: " I think we probably might mature slightly for this album, but we want to keep the kind of uplifting message we had on the last one. [...] We’re just gonna make it better; step it up." "It's definitely matured more and it's a bit more R&B," they completed in another interview. The girl group recorded material in Los Angeles with producers Jimmy Jam and Terry Lewis, as well as TMS, who produced their number-one single "Wings". The production team produced six tracks on the album, including "Salute", which also became the album's title. On 5 April 2014, the group announced the track as the album's third single. They teased their single announcement with a video of them rehearsing a dance routine to the track alongside their backing dancers. Later, on 19 April 2014, the group revealed the single's cover art.

== Composition and lyrics ==
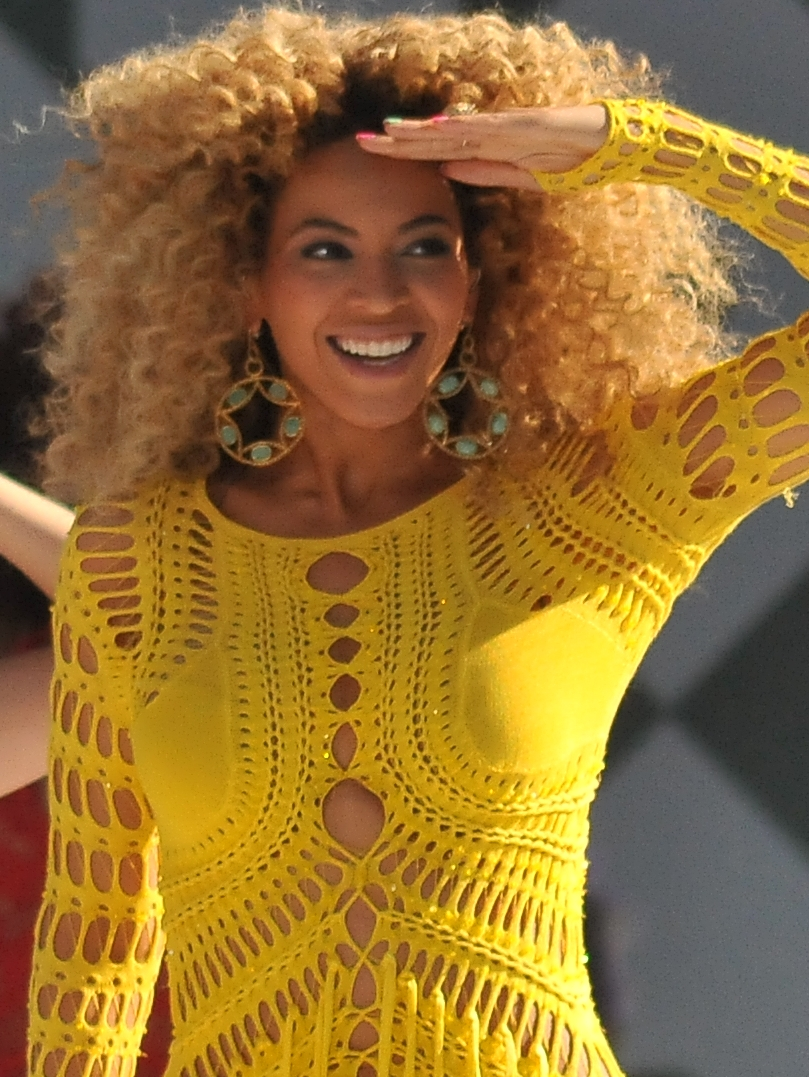
The song received comparisons to the work of Beyoncé and her former group Destiny's Child

"Salute" was written by band members Perrie Edwards, Jesy Nelson, Leigh-Anne Pinnock and Jade Thirlwall, with Thomas Barnes, Peter Kelleher, Ben Kohn and Maegan Cottone, while production was done by TMS. Cottone recorded their vocals, while also providing vocal arrangement, while Barnes was also responsible for drums, Kelleher provided keyboards and Kohn also contribute with bass. It was recorded at Starlight Sound. "Salute" features war sirens, stinging guitars and military chants, featuring hip hop beats and a trap experimentation. It starts with "an air raid siren – a warning and call to action - building to a frantic and frenetic climax," as noted by Jamie Clarke of So So Gay. Rachel McGrath of Entertainment Wise wrote that the song draws comparisons to Beyoncé and Destiny's Child, claiming that it has "Run The World (Girls)"-esque chant and strong beat. Harriet Gibsone of The Guardian also saw similarities, calling it a "Beyoncé boot-camp stomp." Phil Mongredien of The Observer wrote that the song "turns into 'Battlestar' by 90s boyband Five as it reaches its chorus."

Lyrically, "Salute" brims with girl-power motifs dressed up in military metaphors, affirming that being a woman is about more than just looking good: "You think we're just pretty things/You couldn't be more wrong/We're standing strong, carry on," they sing. Mongredien called it "a call to arms for the world's women." As noted by Nick Barnes of Unreality TV, "the girls try and recruit all the women out there to salute and join their army." Janelle Tucknott of Renowned for Sound went on to explain that the song "is all about women empowerment and joining together to fight a war, assumedly that of bullying and negativity and the struggle for equal rights." "'You think we’re just pretty things. You couldn’t be more wrong,' the girls sing, sending a message not only to any sexist standing out there but also to every woman who just needs a little motivation to believe in themselves," Kadeen Griffiths of Bustle noted. "We’re standing strong. We carry on... can't stop a hurricane. Ladies, it's time to awake!."

== Critical reception ==
Jon O'Brien wrote for Yahoo! that the song is "a perfect attitude-laden statement of intent." Lewis Corner of Digital Spy noted that the "Blitzkrieg siren and fierce attitude on female empowerment call-out 'Salute' is primed for an arena tour intro," while McGrath of Entertainment Wise called it "one of the strongest openers of 2013." Mongredien of The Observer thought that "it shouldn't work, but is delivered with such chutzpah that it has a certain ludicrous charm", while Clarke of So So Gay named it a "perfect, in-your-face opening track." Nick Barnes of Unreality TV was very positive, writing that the song "has everything you’d want in a track," noting that "Salute" "would serve as an amazing opening to the girls’ tour to get the audience really pumped and it would, strangely, work as a single as it’s very infectious."

Oysmita Majumder of Rolling Stone India ranked the song as the second-best feminist song of all-time.

Attitude named the song #8 on their list of 32 greatest Little Mix singles writing "one of Little Mix’s ongoing empowering themes of women sticking together standing up and for themselves."

== Commercial performance ==
"Salute" debuted at number 74 on the UK Singles Chart week of 11 May 2014, becoming the "greatest gainer" the following week, climbing to number 51. It cracked the top-forty in its third week, climbing to number 35. After falling to number 40, the song climbed once again to number 24. The song peaked at number 6 the following week, on 21 June 2014, becoming the band's sixth top-ten single.

== Music video ==
The music video for the song was filmed on 7 April 2014 and directed by Colin Tilley. It was premiered on YouTube on 2 May 2014. It features the band dancing in an underground warehouse with an entourage of male dancers, some of whom are on leads. As noted by Kadeen Grifiths of Bustle, band members Nelson and Edwards "even march with the men on leashes at one point. And yet they are next to her rather than behind her or beneath her, dancing with her rather than against her or in front of her, as if the girls wanted to be clear that men and woman are equal, but it’s the women who are in control right now."

The version of the song used for the video is slightly different to the album version, as it contains some additional percussion. This version has never been released commercially in its full length, though an edited version, which cuts the intro and the outro short, was used for the single release.

== Live performances ==
Little Mix performed "Salute" live for the first time on Britain's Got Talent. They also performed the song on the Today Show on 18 June 2014 and during their set at the Summertime Ball on 21 June 2014.

== Use in media ==
The song has been used in survival shows for K-pop trainees and was featured at the 2016 Summer Olympics. In 2017, Salute was used in a campaign advert for the England Women’s football team ahead of the 2017 UEFA Women's Champions League. In 2018, it was selected as the official theme song for WWE Evolution, the company's first-ever all women's pay-per-view. In 2021, the song was ranked as one of the best girl power songs.

== Track listing ==
- Digital EP
1. "Salute" (Single Version) – 3:08
2. "Salute" (TroyBoi Remix) – 3:36
3. "Salute" (Anakyn Remix) – 5:12
4. "Move" (acoustic) – 2:57
5. "Who's Lovin' You" (a cappella) – 1:09
6. "Salute" (Single Version) (Instrumental) – 3:03

== Charts ==
Chart (2014)	Peak position
Belgium (Ultratip Bubbling Under Flanders)	27
Euro Digital Songs (Billboard)	19
Ireland (IRMA)	12
Scottish Singles Sales (Official Charts)	5
UK Singles (Official Charts)	6
UK Airplay (Music Week)	25

== Certifications ==
Region	Certification	Certified units/sales
Brazil (Pro-Música Brasil)	Platinum	60,000^{‡}
United Kingdom (BPI)	Platinum	600,000^{‡}
^{‡} Sales+streaming figures based on certification alone.

== Release history ==
Region	Date	Format	Label
United Kingdom	3 May 2014	Digital download	Syco Music
