= The Glory Days Tour =

2017–2018 concert tour by Little Mix

- Tour by Little Mix
- Location: Europe; Asia; Oceania
- Associated album: Glory Days
- Start date: 21 May 2017
- End date: 25 March 2018
- Legs: 5
- No. of shows: 72
- Attendance: 810,810
- Box office: $42 million

Little Mix concert chronology
- The Get Weird Tour (2016); The Glory Days Tour (2017-2018); Summer Hits Tour 2018 (2018)

The Glory Days Tour was the second worldwide tour and fourth overall by British girl group Little Mix. The tour began on 21 May 2017 in Birkenhead, England, and ended on 25 March 2018 in Kobe, Japan, where the group headlined POPSPRING, in support of their fourth studio album, Glory Days. The tour sold over 810,000 tickets worldwide and consisted of over 70 shows being performed across Oceania, Europe, and Asia.

The Glory Days Tour was met with critical acclaim and grossed over $42 million worldwide, becoming the highest grossing girl group tour of the decade at that time. In 2017, it was ranked as the sixth highest grossing female tour of that year. It remains as the group's highest grossing tour throughout their career, and one of the highest grossing girl group tours.

== Background ==
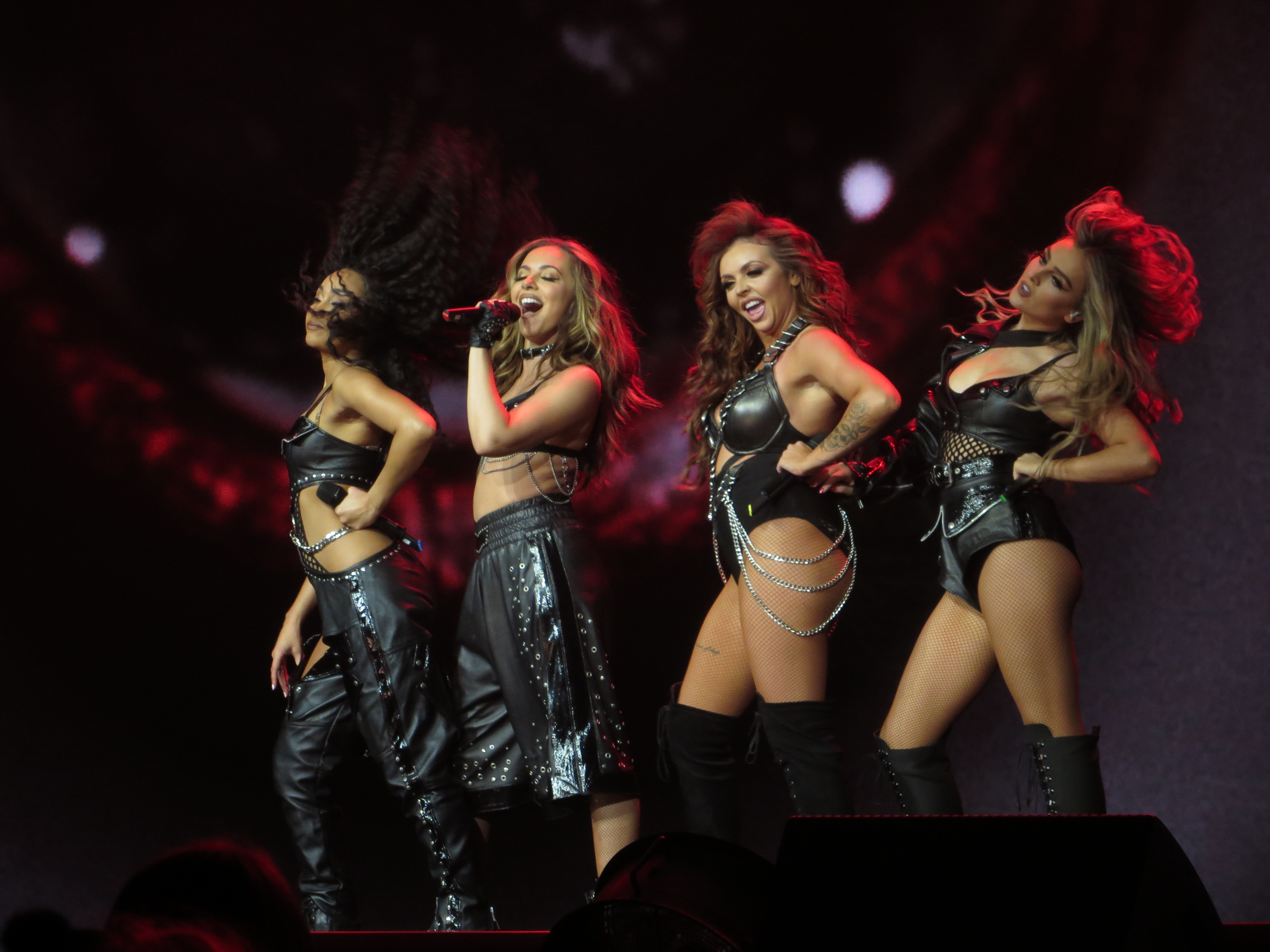
The group performing "Black Magic" in Glasgow, Scotland.

On 9 September 2016, Little Mix stated in an interview that they knew when their next tour would be, but fans would have to wait for further details.

On 14 October 2016, Little Mix released the dates for the UK & Ireland leg of the tour, beginning on 27 October 2017 in Sheffield, England. Ticket pre-sales were made available to fans who pre-ordered their new album and began on 19 October 2016 with general sale beginning on 21 October 2016. Due to instant sell outs, extra dates were added in Newcastle, Belfast, Glasgow, Nottingham, Birmingham, and London. After overwhelming demand, the UK & Ireland leg was extended, and began on 9 October 2017 in Aberdeen, Scotland. European tour dates were announced on 21 November 2016, for May and June 2017, while dates in Oceania were added for July 2017 on 4 December 2016.

The Vamps supported the European leg of the tour. Ella Eyre, Sheppard, Louisa Johnson all supported selected dates on the Summer Shout Out shows. Zoe Badwi, Jade Thirlwall's cousin, was the opening act for the shows in Australia and New Zealand. Lina Makhul, Jessarae, and Aleem all supported selected dates on the UK & Ireland leg of the tour, while Lloyd Macey supported at the Manchester Arena show on 21 November 2017 after winning a prize fight on The X Factor.

In November 2017, Little Mix were announced as the headline act for "POPSPRING 2018" in March 2018.

== Set list ==
Europe and Oceania
1. "Power"
2. "Black Magic"
3. "Salute"
4. "Down & Dirty"
5. "F.U."
6. "Hair"
7. "Your Love"
8. "Secret Love Song, Pt II"
9. "No More Sad Songs"
10. "You Gotta Not"
11. "Wings"
12. "Touch"
13. "Nobody Like You"
14. "Shout Out to My Ex"
UK and Ireland
1. "Power
2. "Black Magic"
3. "Private Show"
4. "Move"
5. "F.U."

Act 2

6. "No More Sad Songs"
7. "Your Love"
8. "Secret Love Song, Pt II"
9. "Nothing Else Matters"
10. "Wings”

Act 3

11. "Salute"
12. "Down & Dirty"
13. "DNA" / "Freak"
14. "Hair"
15. "Touch" / ”Reggaetón Lento (Remix)"

Encore

16. "Shout Out to My Ex"
Asia
1. "Power"
2. "Black Magic"
3. "Move"
4. "No More Sad Songs"
5. "Secret Love Song, Pt II"
6. "Wings"
7. "Salute"
8. "DNA"
9. "Hair"
10. "Touch" / "Reggaetón Lento (Remix)"
11. "Shout Out to My Ex"

== Tour dates ==
List of concerts
Date	City	Country	Venue	Opening acts	Attendance	Revenue
21 May 2017 (Note: The 21 May 2017 concert in Birkenhead, England is a part of Wirral Live 2017.)	Birkenhead	United Kingdom	Prenton Park	—N/a	14,690 / 14,690	$745,287
24 May 2017	Berlin	Germany	Mercedez Benz Arena	The Vamps	3,964 / 6,194	$166,371
25 May 2017	Düsseldorf	Germany	Mitsubishi Electric Halle	The Vamps	5,644 / 7,124	$258,174
27 May 2017	Vienna	Austria	Gasometer	The Vamps	—N/a	—N/a
28 May 2017 (Note: The 28 May 2017 concert in Hull, England is a part of Radio 1's Big Weekend.)	Hull	United Kingdom	Burton Constable Hall	—N/a	—N/a	—N/a
29 May 2017	Zürich	Switzerland	Samsung Hall	The Vamps	—N/a	—N/a
30 May 2017	Assago (Note: Promoted as Milan.)	Italy	Mediolanum Forum	The Vamps	—N/a	—N/a
31 May 2017	Munich	Germany	Olympiahalle	The Vamps	3,596 / 4,764	$163,852
2 June 2017	Antwerp	Belgium	Lotto Arena	The Vamps	7,321 / 7,348	$292,413
3 June 2017	Amsterdam	Netherlands	AFAS Live	The Vamps	3,511 / 3,511	$178,067
5 June 2017	Copenhagen	Denmark	Valby-Hallen	The Vamps	—N/a	—N/a
6 June 2017	Stockholm	Sweden	Annexet	The Vamps	2,348 / 3,000	$99,673
8 June 2017	Paris	France	Zénith de Paris	The Vamps	—N/a	—N/a
23 June 2017	Newmarket	United Kingdom	Newmarket Racecourse	Ella Eyre; Sheppard	18,732 / 19,610	$897,983
24 June 2017	Gloucester	United Kingdom	Kingsholm Stadium	Ella Eyre; Sheppard	19,810 / 20,050	$634,132
25 June 2017	Twickenham	United Kingdom	Twickenham Stoop	Ella Eyre; Sheppard	16,492 / 20,000	$680,907
29 June 2017	Dundee	United Kingdom	Slessor Gardens	Ella Eyre; Sheppard	11,122 / 11,148	$570,050
30 June 2017	Edinburgh	United Kingdom	Royal Highland Centre	Ella Eyre; Sheppard	15,000 / 15,000	$646,544
1 July 2017	Derby	United Kingdom	Donington Park	Ella Eyre; Sheppard	17,609 / 20,050	$671,608
6 July 2017	Scarborough	United Kingdom	Scarborough Open Air Theatre	Sheppard	7,314 / 7,384	$332,487
7 July 2017 (Note: The 7 July 2017 show at Old Royal Naval College in London is part of the Greenwich Music Time 2017 festival.)	London	United Kingdom	Old Royal Naval College	—N/a	7,245 / 7,245	$303,039
8 July 2017	Colwyn Bay	United Kingdom	Eirias Stadium	Ella Eyre; Sheppard	14,713 / 14,761	$624,256
9 July 2017	Southampton	United Kingdom	Ageas Bowl	Sheppard	19,739 / 19,799	$970,077
13 July 2017	Monmouthshire	United Kingdom	Caldicot Castle	Louisa Johnson; Sheppard	11,750 / 11,750	$588,930
14 July 2017	Exeter	United Kingdom	Powderham Castle	Ella Eyre; Sheppard	14,860 / 14,860	$644,232
15 July 2017	Durham	United Kingdom	County Cricket Club Emirates Riverside	Ella Eyre; Sheppard	14,983 / 14,987	$642,954
16 July 2017	Carlisle	United Kingdom	Bitts Park	Ella Eyre; Sheppard	17,000 / 17,000	$734,908
20 July 2017	Perth	Australia	Crown Theatre	Zoe Badwi	—N/a	—N/a
22 July 2017	Melbourne	Australia	Margaret Court Arena	Zoe Badwi	10,926 / 11,732	$782,027
23 July 2017	Melbourne	Australia	Margaret Court Arena	Zoe Badwi	10,926 / 11,732	$782,027
26 July 2017	Adelaide	Australia	AEC Theatre	Zoe Badwi	—N/a	—N/a
28 July 2017	Brisbane	Australia	Brisbane Entertainment Centre	Zoe Badwi	7,403 / 7,403	$526,010
29 July 2017	Sydney	Australia	Qudos Bank Arena	Zoe Badwi	13,748 / 13,748	$973,512
30 July 2017	Auckland	New Zealand	Spark Arena	—N/a	—N/a	—N/a
1 September 2017	Ardingly	United Kingdom	South of England Showground	Ella Eyre; Germein Sisters	14,487 / 19,810	$716,253
2 September 2017	Liverpool	United Kingdom	Otterspool Promenade	—N/a	24,067 / 28,506	$717,220
3 September 2017	Norwich	United Kingdom	Earlham Park	Nina Nesbitt; Germein Sisters	18,120 / 19,988	$870,706
9 October 2017	Aberdeen	United Kingdom	GE Oil & Gas Arena	Lina Makhul; Jessarae	9,176 / 9,575	$574,518
10 October 2017	Aberdeen	United Kingdom	GE Oil & Gas Arena	Lina Makhul; Jessarae	9,176 / 9,575	$574,518
11 October 2017	Newcastle	United Kingdom	Metro Radio Arena	Lina Makhul; Jessarae	38,073 / 39,154	$2,211,632
13 October 2017	Birmingham	United Kingdom	Genting Arena	Lina Makhul; Jessarae	52,142 / 53,195	$2,870,881
14 October 2017 (Note: The box office score for 14 October is for both the Matinee & Evening shows.)	Leeds	United Kingdom	First Direct Arena	Lina Makhul; Jessarae	34,346 / 34,386	$1,855,769
16 October 2017	Liverpool	United Kingdom	Echo Arena	Lina Makhul; Jessarae	29,351 / 29,351	$1,627,254
17 October 2017	Sheffield	United Kingdom	Sheffield Arena	Lina Makhul; Jessarae	36,118 / 36,528	$1,994,038
19 October 2017	Glasgow	United Kingdom	SSE Hydro	Lina Makhul; Jessarae	45,450 / 45,450	$2,479,618
20 October 2017	Manchester	United Kingdom	Manchester Arena	Lina Makhul; Jessarae	43,579 / 43,579	$2,340,889
26 October 2017	London	United Kingdom	The O_{2} Arena	Lina Makhul; Jessarae	63,702 / 67,099	$3,874,974
27 October 2017	Sheffield	United Kingdom	Sheffield Arena	Lina Makhul; Jessarae	(Note: The boxscore data for 27–28 October 2017 is combined with the 17 October 2017 data.)	
28 October 2017	Sheffield	United Kingdom	Sheffield Arena	Lina Makhul; Jessarae	(Note: The boxscore data for 27–28 October 2017 is combined with the 17 October 2017 data.)	
30 October 2017	Cardiff	United Kingdom	Motorpoint Arena Cardiff	Lina Makhul; Jessarae	9,301 / 9,301	$535,059
31 October 2017	Cardiff	United Kingdom	Motorpoint Arena Cardiff	Lina Makhul; Jessarae	9,301 / 9,301	$535,059
1 November 2017	Liverpool	United Kingdom	Echo Arena	Lina Makhul; Jessarae	(Note: The boxscore data for 1 November 2017 is combined with the 16 October 2017 data.)	
3 November 2017 (Note: The box office score for 3 November is combined with 4 November's Matinee & Evening Show.)	Newcastle	United Kingdom	Metro Radio Arena	Aleem	(Note: The boxscore data for 3 November 2017 is combined with the 11 October 2017 data.)	
4 November 2017 (Note: The 4 November 2017 show at Metro Radio Arena in Newcastle includes a matinee and evening show.)	Newcastle	United Kingdom	Metro Radio Arena	Aleem	(Note: The boxscore data for 3 November 2017 is combined with the 11 October 2017 data.)	
6 November 2017	Dublin	Ireland	3Arena	Aleem	12,459 / 12,459	$697,796
7 November 2017 (Note: The box office score for 7 November is combined with 8 November)	Belfast	United Kingdom	The SSE Arena	Aleem	17,168 / 17,168	$993,124
8 November 2017	Belfast	United Kingdom	The SSE Arena	Aleem	17,168 / 17,168	$993,124
10 November 2017 (Note: The box office score for 10 November is combined with 11 November's Matinee & Evening Show.)	Glasgow	United Kingdom	SSE Hydro	Aleem	(Note: The boxscore data for 8–10 November 2017 is combined with the 19 October 2017 data.)	
11 November 2017 (Note: The 11 November 2017 show at the SSE Hydro in Glasgow includes a matinee and evening show.)	Glasgow	United Kingdom	SSE Hydro	Aleem	(Note: The boxscore data for 8–10 November 2017 is combined with the 19 October 2017 data.)	
13 November 2017	Leeds	United Kingdom	First Direct Arena	Aleem	(Note: The boxscore data for 13 November 2017 is combined with the 14 October 2017 data.)	
14 November 2017	Nottingham	United Kingdom	Motorpoint Arena Nottingham	Aleem	15,705 / 15,705	$859,055
15 November 2017	Nottingham	United Kingdom	Motorpoint Arena Nottingham	Aleem	15,705 / 15,705	$859,055
17 November 2017	Birmingham	United Kingdom	Genting Arena	Aleem	(Note: The boxscore data for 15–17 November 2017 is combined with the 13 October 2017 data.)	
18 November 2017 (Note: The 18 November 2017 show at Genting Arena in Birmingham includes a matinee and evening show.)	Birmingham	United Kingdom	Genting Arena	Aleem	(Note: The boxscore data for 15–17 November 2017 is combined with the 13 October 2017 data.)	
20 November 2017	Liverpool	United Kingdom	Echo Arena	Aleem	(Note: The boxscore data for 20 November 2017 is combined with the 16 October 2017 data.)	
21 November 2017	Manchester	United Kingdom	Manchester Arena	Lloyd Macey; Aleem	(Note: The boxscore data for 21–22 November 2017 is combined with the 20 October 2017 data.)	
22 November 2017	Manchester	United Kingdom	Manchester Arena	Aleem	(Note: The boxscore data for 21–22 November 2017 is combined with the 20 October 2017 data.)	
25 November 2017 (Note: The 25 November 2017, show at The O_{2} Arena in London includes a matinee and evening show.) (Note: The box office score for 26 November is combined with 25 November's Matinee & Evening Show.)	London	United Kingdom	The O_{2} Arena	Aleem	(Note: The boxscore data for 25–26 November 2017 is combined with the 26 October 2017 data.)	
26 November 2017	London	United Kingdom	The O_{2} Arena	Aleem	(Note: The boxscore data for 25–26 November 2017 is combined with the 26 October 2017 data.)	
24 March 2018	Chiba	Japan	Makuhari Messe	—N/a	—N/a	—N/a
25 March 2018	Kobe	Japan	World Memorial Hall	—N/a	—N/a	—N/a
Total					810,810	$42,000,000
