= Hair (Little Mix song) =

Single by Little Mix featuring Sean Paul

from the album Get Weird
- Released: 15 April 2016
- Genre: Dance-pop
- Length: 3:29 (album version); 3:53 (remix version ft. Sean Paul)
- Label: Syco
- Songwriters: Anita Blay; Edvard Førre Erfjord; Iain James; Henrik Michelsen; Camille Purcell; Sean Paul Henriques
- Producer: Electric

Little Mix singles chronology
"Secret Love Song" (2016)	"Hair" (2016)	"Shout Out to My Ex" (2016)

Sean Paul singles chronology
"Lay You Down Easy" (2016)	"Hair" (2016)	"Trumpets" (2016)

Music video
- "Hair" on YouTube

"Hair" is a song by British girl group Little Mix. It was released on 28 August 2015 as the first promotional single from the group's third studio album Get Weird. On 15 April 2016, a remix featuring Jamaican rapper and singer Sean Paul was released by Syco Music as the fourth and final single from the album.

"Hair" is a song about getting over an ex and taking control of a relationship once it ends. It has been described as a "break up anthem". The song reached the top ten of the charts in Australia and Scotland, the top twenty in the United Kingdom and Ireland, and charted in other territories including France, Belgium, and Greece. It was nominated for Best British Video of the Year at the 2017 Brit Awards and been certified platinum by the British Phonographic Industry (BPI). It has been certified double platinum in Australia, triple platinum in Brazil and gold in the Netherlands.

== Chart performance ==
Following its release as an instant "grat track" in promotion of Get Weird, "Hair" debuted at number 35 on the UK Singles Chart on the week ending 10 September 2015. The new version featuring Sean Paul entered the UK Singles Chart at number 31 on the week ending 28 April 2016, and later peaked at number 11. "Hair" also reached the top 10 in Australia and Scotland and the top 20 in Ireland.

== Music video ==
The official music video for "Hair" was released on 20 April 2016 on Vevo and was directed by Director X, who previously directed the video to the album's first single "Black Magic". The video revolves around a sleepover the group are having while confronting Paul in a FaceTime call after Leigh-Anne Pinnock had seen a picture of him with a woman on their Instagram feed.

== Live performances ==
Little Mix performed "Hair" live for the first time on 13 March 2016 in Cardiff for the opening night of their Get Weird Tour. On 11 June 2016 they performed the song at Wembley Stadium for Capital FM Summertime Ball. On 15 June 2016, they performed the song for the first time on television for RTL Late Night in The Netherlands. On 23 June they performed an a-cappella version of the song at C’Cauet sur NRJ in Belgium and Jade Thirlwall sang the uncensored chorus for the first time. The group performed the song at V Festival on 21 August 2016 before adding a breakdown section of Willow Smith's "Whip My Hair" at the end. On 23 October 2016, they performed "Hair" at BBC Radio 1 Teen Awards at Wembley Arena in London. They performed the song live on the Australian morning TV show "Sunrise" on 13 November. The group also performed the song at Free Radio Live in Birmingham on 26 November and Capital FM's Jingle Bell Ball on 3 December 2016 at The O2 Arena.

In early 2017, "Hair" was included in Little Mix's opening setlist for Ariana Grande's Dangerous Woman Tour in North America. The group performed the song live with Sean Paul for the first and only time at Capital FM Summertime Ball on 14 June 2017 at Wembley Stadium. The song was also performed as part of the Glory Days Tour in 2017 and the Summer Hits Tour in 2018.

== Track listing ==
- Digital download
1. "Hair" (featuring Sean Paul) – 3:53
- Wideboys remix
1. "Hair" (featuring Sean Paul) [Wideboys remix] – 3:49

== Personnel ==
Adapted from Apple Music.

- Electric – songwriter, producer, engineer, instruments, programming
- Iain James – songwriter
- Camille Purcell – songwriter
- Anita Blay – songwriter
- Sean Paul – vocals, songwriter
- Maegan Cottone – vocal producer
- Chris Bishop – vocal recording engineer
- Wez Clarke – mixing engineer
- Tom Coyne – mastering engineer
- Randy Merrill – assistant engineer
- Blake Mares – engineer

== Charts ==
=== Weekly charts ===
Chart (2015–16)	Peak position
Australia Digital Song Sales (Billboard)	7
Australia (ARIA)	10
Belgium (Ultratip Bubbling Under Flanders)	14
Euro Digital Song Sales (Billboard)	15
Finland Download (Latauslista)	19
France (SNEP)	137
Ireland (IRMA)	20
Mexico Ingles Airplay (Billboard)	11
New Zealand (Recorded Music NZ)	32
Scotland Singles (OCC)	7
UK Singles (OCC)	11

=== Year-end charts ===
Chart (2016)	Position
Australia (ARIA)	73
UK Singles (Official Charts Company)	63

== Certifications ==
Region	Certification	Certified units/sales
Australia (ARIA)	2× Platinum	140,000^{‡}
Brazil (Pro-Música Brasil)	3× Platinum	180,000^{‡}
Netherlands (NVPI)	Gold	20,000^{‡}
New Zealand (RMNZ)	Platinum	30,000^{‡}
United Kingdom (BPI)	Platinum	927,000
^{‡} Sales+streaming figures based on certification alone.

== Release history ==
Region	Date	Format	Label
New Zealand	15 April 2016	Digital download	Syco
