= Little Me (song) =

2013 song by Little Mix

Single by Little Mix

from the album Salute
- Released: 30 December 2013
- Genre: R&B
- Length: 3:55 (album version); 3:31 (single mix)
- Label: Syco
- Songwriters: Little Mix; TMS; Iain James
- Producer: TMS

Little Mix singles chronology
"Move" (2013)	"Little Me" (2013)	"Word Up!" (2014)

Music video
- "Little Me" on YouTube

"Little Me" is a song by British girl group Little Mix. It was released by Syco Music, as the second single from the group's second studio album, Salute (2013). It was co-written by group members Perrie Edwards, Jesy Nelson, Jade Thirlwall, and Leigh-Anne Pinnock, along with TMS and Iain James, with production done by TMS. It was met with positive reviews from music critics and samples a part from Gabriel Fauré's Pavane. It peaked at number 14 on the UK Singles Chart, and charted in Australia, Belgium, Ireland, and Lebanon. "Little Me" has since been certified silver in the United Kingdom.

== Critical reception ==
Robert Copsey of Digital Spy gave the song a positive review, calling it "effortless and uplifting" and awarding it four out of five stars. In another four-star review, Renowned for Sound's Melissa Redman complimented the song's "exceptional vocals", "perfect harmonies" and "mature lyrics".

Isaac Mace-Tessler of Pop Scoop gave the song a very positive review, saying "'Little Me' has a strong message of inspiration and liberation, all about the girls' present selves telling their younger, little selves not to worry and to 'speak up, shout out, be a bit prouder' and believe that they are already 'beautiful, wonderful'. The track thus follows and holds its own in the grand tradition of R&B empowerment ballads such as Sugababes' "Ugly", Destiny's Child's "Survivor" and Christina Aguilera's "Beautiful". The song's music video further underlines its heartfelt meaning: shot in earnest B&W, the girls emotively sing in an abandoned warehouse, interspersed with girls and women talking about their hopes, dreams and insecurities."

== Music video ==
In an interview with FrontRowLiveEnt.com, regarding the official music video, Jesy Nelson said: "We've never really done a video like this before. This is very heartfelt and meaningful. It's very sincere."

The video premiered on YouTube on 18 December 2013. It features Little Mix in an abandoned chapel. It also features various actors telling their stories and what they have overcome. The video is also in black and white, making Little Mix's first music video to be released in that format.

== Live performances ==
Little Mix performed "Little Me" on The Xtra Factor on 3 November 2013, and on the Capital FM Jingle Bell Ball on 8 December 2013. The US got their first live performance of the song on Good Morning America. The single was also put to the setlists of The Salute Tour (2014) and The Get Weird Tour (2016).

== Track listing ==
- Digital remixes
1. "Little Me" (Single Mix) – 3:31
2. "Little Me" (WestFunk and Steve Smart Remix) – 2:54
3. "Little Me" (DE$iGNATED Radio Remix) – 3:48
4. "Little Me" (Live The Xtra Factor Performance) – 2:37
5. "Little Me" (Instrumental) – 3:28

== Chart performance ==
"Little Me" entered the UK Singles Chart at number 51 on 15 December 2013, peaking at number 14 on 12 January 2014.

== Charts ==
Chart (2013–14)	Peak position
Australia (ARIA)	85
Belgium (Ultratip Bubbling Under Flanders)	56
Ireland (IRMA)	26
Lebanon (Lebanese Top 20)	10
Netherlands (Dutch Top 40 Tipparade)	16
Scotland Singles (OCC)	18
UK Singles (OCC)	14
UK Airplay (Music Week)	9

== Certifications ==
Region	Certification	Certified units/sales
United Kingdom (BPI)	Silver	200,000^{‡}
^{‡} Sales+streaming figures based on certification alone.

== Release history ==
Region	Date	Format	Label
Ireland	30 December 2013	Digital download	Syco Music
United Kingdom	30 December 2013	Digital download	Syco Music
