= DNA (Little Mix song) =

Single by Little Mix

from the album DNA
- Released: 9 November 2012
- Genre: Electropop; techno-pop
- Length: 3:56
- Label: Syco
- Songwriters: Thomas Barnes; Peter Kelleher; Ben Kohn; Iain James; Perrie Edwards; Jesy Nelson; Leigh-Anne Pinnock; Jade Thirlwall
- Producer: TMS

Little Mix singles chronology
"Wings" (2012)	"DNA" (2012)	"Change Your Life" (2013)

Music video
- "DNA" on YouTube

"DNA" is a song by British girl group Little Mix. It was released on 9 November 2012, through Syco Music, as the second single from their debut studio album of the same name (2012). It was written by the group members, along with production team TMS and songwriter Iain James.

"DNA" was met with mixed reviews from critics; some likened its style to music by Girls Aloud while others found it unoriginal. It has been described as a mid-tempo electropop and techno-pop track featuring eerie synths, a music box introduction, spoken-word middle eight and elements of dubstep. The lyrics was inspired by the group members' experiences with love, and have a theme of obsession. "DNA" reached number three on the UK Singles Chart. It reached the top ten in Ireland and Hungary, and peaked at number fourteen on the US Bubbling Under Hot 100. The song also charted in Australia, France, and Slovakia.

The music video was directed by Sarah Chatfield and features the group portraying assassins who stalk and kidnap a man. It was inspired by the comic books Sin City and Watchmen. The group promoted the song with televised performances on Loose Women, and The X Factor UK. The song was performed as part of four of the group's concert tours, including The Glory Days Tour in 2017. As of 2022, it has been certified gold in the United Kingdom, Australia, and Brazil.

== Background ==
Little Mix co-wrote "DNA" with production team TMS, and songwriter Iain James. The song was inspired by the group members' personal experiences with love; Perrie Edwards said the group "perform better when the lyrics mean something to [them] when [they] sing them." The song was intended as a darker and more mature contrast to the group's previous single "Wings", in a style akin to their 2011 performance of Katy Perry's "E.T." on the eighth UK series of the British television talent show The X Factor. Jesy Nelson said, "'Wings' was very upbeat and fun and colourful, and we wanted to show how versatile we were". According to Jade Thirlwall, the group "just wanted to write about a boy, but without making it typical. We came up with the scientific idea and then started matching science words with love." It was one of two songs being considered for release as the album's second single; the group chose "DNA" believing it better showcased their vocals and a more serious side to their personalities.

== Composition ==
"DNA"
A 1 minute sample of "DNA", featuring the song's choral interlude and the group harmonising the refrain "It's in his DNA, d-d-d-DNA".

"DNA" is composed in the key of E♭ minor using 4/4 time and a tempo of 70 beats per minute. Little Mix's vocal range spans from E♭_{3} to C♭_{5}. The verses follow a chord progression of E♭m–C♭–G♭–B♭m/F. It is a midtempo, electropop and techno-pop song, with a pronounced, grinding beat and elements of dubstep. The track is led by spooky synthesizers and features drums and guitar. The first verse is introduced by a tinkling music box and pumping heart rate monitor, and is performed by Edwards in a low vocal register. After a pre-chorus by Thirlwall, all four group members harmonise the pounding refrain, which is backed by slamming and smashing noises. After Nelson's second verse, Thirlwall's second pre-chorus and the second chorus, the song nearly stops. It then enters into a spoken-word middle eight performed by Leigh-Anne Pinnock in a modulated, robotic style, which is followed by a choral interlude. The third and final chorus is preceded by brief rave klaxons and a high note sung by Edwards.

According to Pinnock, "DNA" is "not just a love song, it's about being obsessed with someone to the extreme. And sometimes when things go bad you do go like that, you stalk them on Facebook ..." Nelson said the group play a character in the song and portray themselves to be darker than they are. Edwards said that when stripped of its scientific words, "DNA" is just a love song about "when a girl first gets with a boy, that kind of romance makes you feel really giddy and happy".

== Release ==
Details about "DNA" emerged after music industry insiders previewed it at a conference held by Sony Music Entertainment on 11 September 2012. Little Mix shared the single's cover art on Twitter on 30 September 2012. On 1 October 2012, a lyric video was posted on Vevo and the song had its radio premiere on Nick Grimshaw's The Radio 1 Breakfast Show. A digital extended play (EP) was made available to pre-order from the iTunes Store the same day. It was released in Ireland on 9 November 2012 and in the UK two days later.

To promote the release, Little Mix held a YouTube competition in which fans shared dance routines for the song. Three entrants won tickets to the group's DNA Tour, a copy of their book Ready to Fly, a copy of the album and a dance tutorial in London with the group's choreographer. A two-track CD single packaged with the album DNA was made available exclusively from music retail chain HMV on 19 November 2012. An unplugged version of "DNA" is included in the deluxe edition of the album.

== Critical reception ==
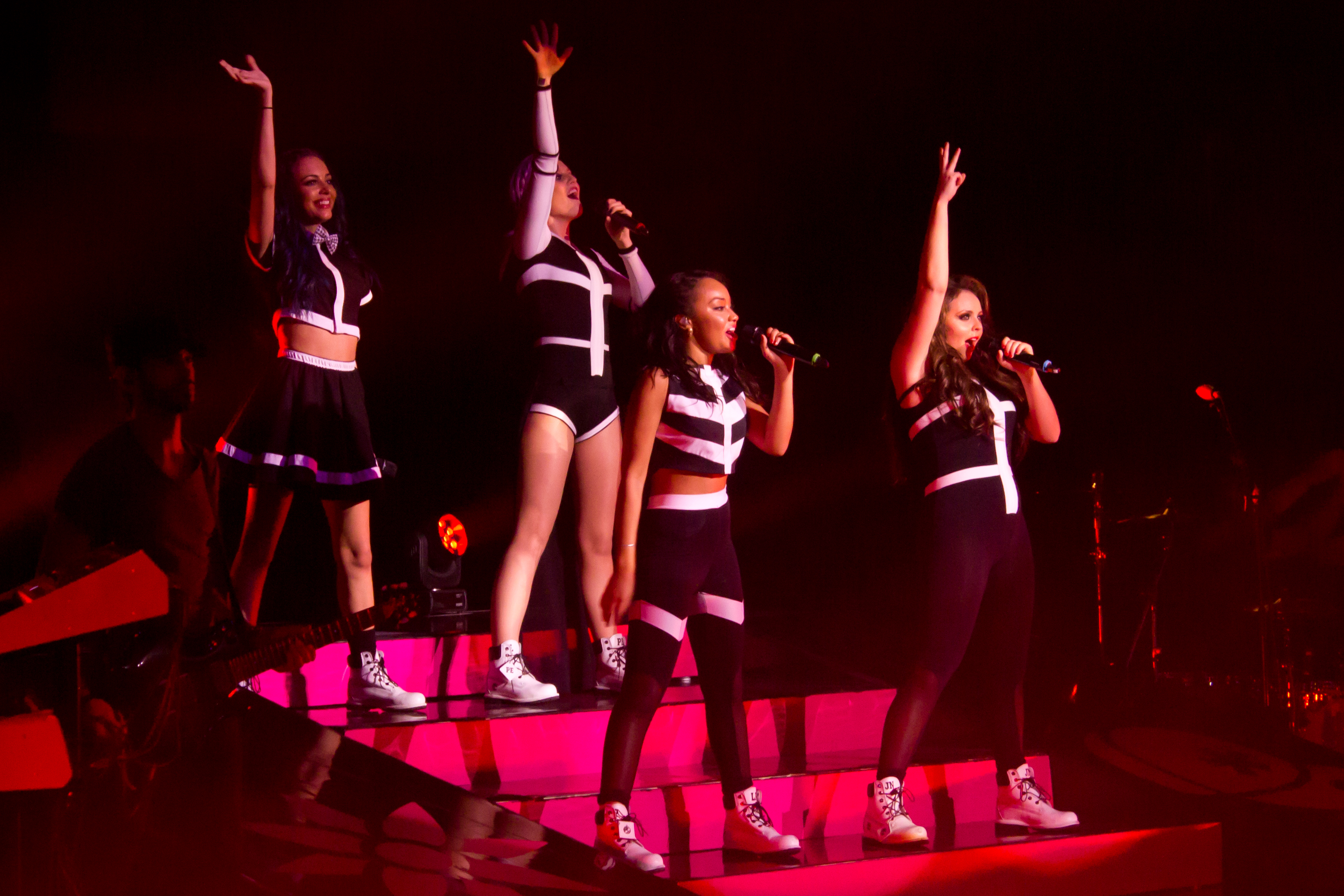
Little Mix performing the song during their 2013 DNA Tour.

Critical response to "DNA" was mixed. In his review for Digital Spy, Robert Copsey gave the track four stars out of five and said, "the epic, operatic middle eight is a pop moment this time they can claim entirely as their own". Laurence Green of DIY regarded it as a "great pop tune by any mark" that "sounds quite a bit like a Girls Aloud song" and "a sign of just how embedded Girls Aloud have become in the fabric of contemporary British pop". Mark Davison of No Ripcord rated the track eight out of ten, describing it as "giddy, glitzy pop which would do Girls Aloud, or at least The Saturdays, proud", adding; "You'll know exactly what 'DNA' sounds like before you hear it, and that's no bad thing". AllMusic's Matt Collar viewed it as one of the album's "truly catchy, infectious cuts".

NME's Eve Barlow was less enthusiastic, writing that the track sounded too much like "E.T." and from "Tulisa's school of 'ballid'". John Murphy of musicOMH derided it as "woeful", "dated, dull and auto-tuned to death." Eoin Butler of The Irish Times gave the song two stars out of five, finding the lyrics melodramatic. Stuart Heritage wrote in The Guardian that it is "not a good song by anyone's standards" and called Pinnock's spoken-word middle-eight "weird". Digital Spy included "DNA" at number 19 in its 2012 year-end list. In 2013, "DNA" was shortlisted for the Popjustice £20 Music Prize.

== Chart performance ==
In November 2012, "DNA" debuted at number three on the UK Singles Chart with first-week sales of 72,044 copies, becoming Little Mix's third consecutive top-three single in the UK. It fell to number 12 the following week, selling 38,386 copies, and spent a total of 13 weeks on the chart. The song was certified gold by the British Phonographic Industry (BPI), and has sold over 453,000 units in the UK, according to the Official Charts Company.

Elsewhere, "DNA" entered the Irish Singles Chart at number eight, making it the group's third consecutive top-ten single in Ireland. It also reached number 10 on Hungary's Single Top 40 chart published by Magyar Hanglemezkiadók Szövetsége (MAHASZ). In Australia, the song peaked at number 48 and was certified gold by the Australian Recording Industry Association (ARIA) for sales of 35,000 copies. Following the album's Columbia Records release in the US in June 2013, "DNA" charted at number 14 on the US Bubbling Under Hot 100.

== Music video ==
=== Development and release ===
The rooftop scene background was created using a matte painting and visual effects software Flame.

The music video for "DNA" was directed by Sarah Chatfield and produced by Tiernan Hanby. It was filmed on 12 September 2012 at British production company Blink's Colonel Blimp location in London and uses chroma keying and post-production. The video was inspired by the comic books Sin City and Watchmen; Chatfield viewed the video as "an unrelenting torrent of bold imagery and epic performances". She worked with visual effects artist Pete Young, her frequent collaborator, to develop the look she wanted for "DNA".

Little Mix's driving scenes were filmed in front of a green screen. The video's rooftop scene was developed using a matte painting by Johan Gay; the painting was separated into different layer depths then composited into the scene using the visual effects software Flame's 3D tracker. 3D modelling artist Greg McKneally developed computer-generated backgrounds, police cars and helicopters that were composited with reflections and light effects. Thirlwall said, "we took the theme of the song, the whole love and obsession thing, and just took it to an extreme". The group released a teaser trailer daily during a four-day countdown to the music video's Vevo premiere on 19 October 2012. A making of video was released on 29 October 2012.

=== Synopsis and reception ===
The music video is in monochrome and red; it depicts Little Mix as female assassins who kidnap a man named Ryan. The video starts with a music box playing. During the first verse, Edwards, accompanied by a bound and gagged Ryan, travels at a high speed in a vintage car. In the next scene, Thirlwall balances on a ledge outside Ryan's bedroom window. All four group members perform a dance routine in black outfits with ammunition belts on a rooftop for the chorus. During the second verse, Nelson speeds in a convertible car while being chased by police. In the next segment, Pinnock is shown masterminding the group's kidnapping plan in a secret room filled with maps and clippings about Ryan that are intercut throughout the video. In the final scene, Ryan is tied to a chair in a warehouse; Little Mix stand in front of him and close in as the video ends.

Digital Spy's Lewis Corner named it the eighth-best pop music video of 2012 and "one of the most diva-worthy videos from a girl group in years". Eve Barlow of NME said it "looks a little (exactly) like Sin City."

== Live performances ==
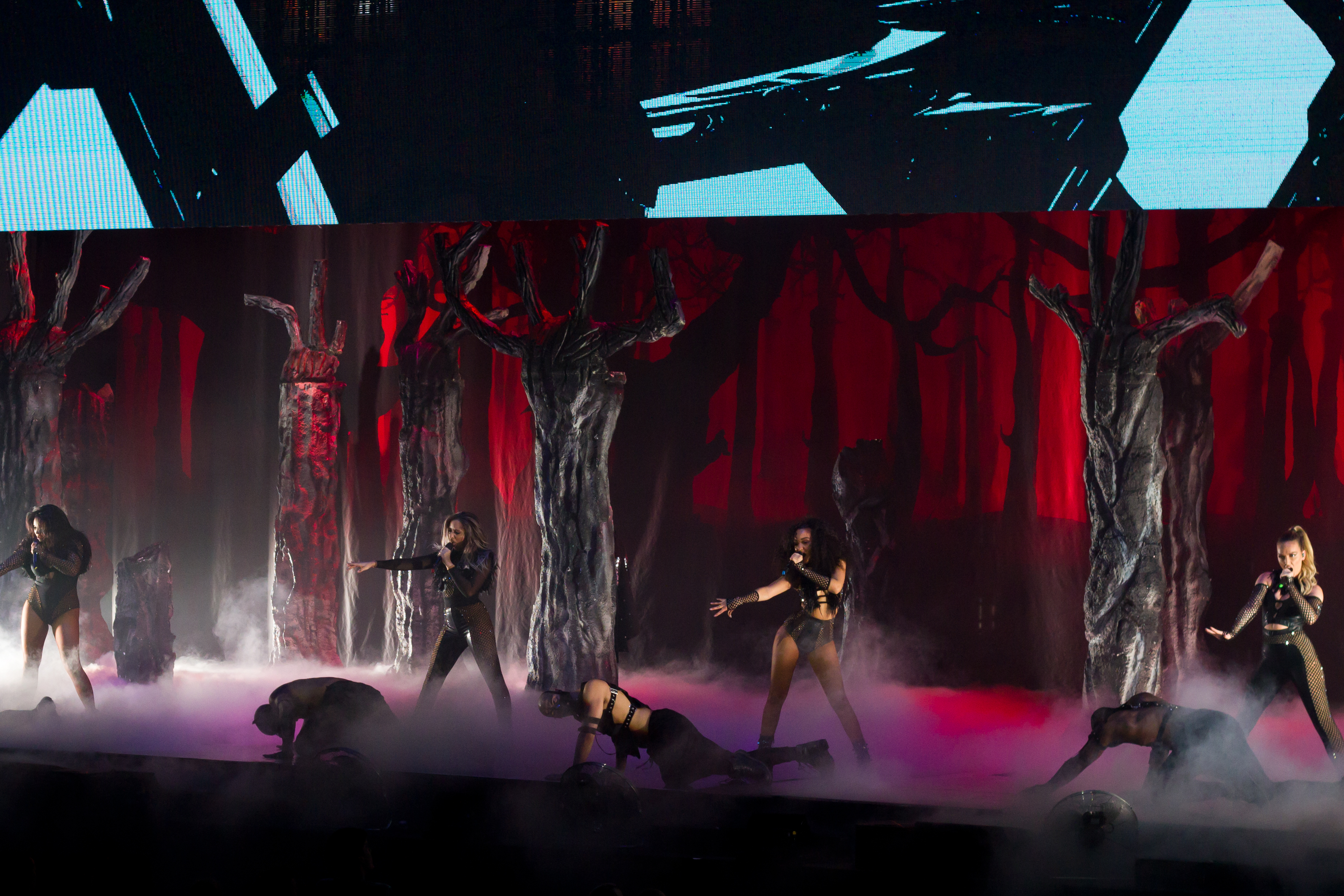
Little Mix performing "DNA" on The Get Weird Tour in 2016.

Little Mix performed "DNA" live for the first time at BBC Radio 1's Teen Awards on 7 October 2012. On 11 November 2012, the group performed the song on the ninth UK series of The X Factor. Backed by a troupe of male dancers, they performed in matching black, gold and blue outfits with ammunition belts. The group performed an acoustic rendition of "DNA" for BBC Radio 1's Live Lounge on 13 November 2012.

Little Mix performed the track on British daytime television programme T4 on 18 November 2012, and sang the acoustic version on British television panel show Loose Women on 23 November 2012. In Ireland, they performed the song at the ChildLine Concert that aired on TV3 on 1 December 2012. On 8 December 2012, the track was included in their set list for Capital FM's Jingle Bell Ball. Backed by a flashing heart rate monitor and sporting star-themed black-and-pink outfits, the group performed without Edwards, who was recovering from a tonsillectomy.

During their 2013 DNA Tour, Little Mix performed the song before the encore with a live band; they were wearing monochrome outfits. "DNA" was also performed during the group's set at BBC Radio 1's Big Weekend on 26 May 2013. Little Mix made their US television debut with performances of "Wings" and "DNA" on Good Morning America on 7 June 2013. On 8 December 2013, they performed the track again at Capital FM's Jingle Bell Ball. For 2014's The Salute Tour, the group performed an extended version of the song; they wore black leather ensembles and were accompanied by male dancers wearing leather capes. As part of Little Mix's 2016 The Get Weird Tour, they performed an alternate version of "DNA" with a Viennese waltz introduction, enchanted forest backdrop and male backing dancers in bondage attire and muzzles. During their 2017 The Glory Days Tour, the song was performed as part of a medley with "Freak", a track from the group's fourth album Glory Days.

== Personnel ==
Credits adapted from the album liner notes of DNA.

- TMS – production
- Daniel Aslet – additional vocal engineering
- Ben Collier – additional vocal engineering
- Thomas Barnes – drums
- Ben Kohn – guitar
- Peter Kelleher – synths
- Serban Ghenea – mixing
- John Hanes – mix engineering
- Phil Seaford – mixing assistance
- Tom Coyne – mastering

== Track listing ==
Digital EP
No.	Title	Length
1.	"DNA"	3:56
2.	"DNA" (Kat Krazy Club Mix)	5:33
3.	"DNA" (Eyes Remix)	4:57
4.	"DNA" (Instrumental)	3:57

CD single
No.	Title	Length
1.	"DNA"	3:57
2.	"DNA" (Kat Krazy Radio Edit)	3:49

== Charts ==
Weekly chart performance for "DNA"
Charts (2012–2013)	Peak position
Australia (ARIA)	48
Euro Digital Song Sales (Billboard)	8
France (SNEP)	177
Hungary (Single Top 40)	10
Ireland (IRMA)	8
Scotland Singles (OCC)	3
Slovakia Airplay (ČNS IFPI)	46
UK Singles (OCC)	3
UK Airplay (Music Week)	14
US Bubbling Under Hot 100 (Billboard)	14

=== Year-end charts ===
Chart (2012)	Position
UK Singles (OCC)	115

== Certifications ==
Region	Certification	Certified units/sales
Australia (ARIA)	Gold	35,000^{^}
Brazil (Pro-Música Brasil)	Gold	30,000^{‡}
United Kingdom (BPI)	Gold	400,000^{‡}
^{^} Shipments figures based on certification alone.^{‡} Sales+streaming figures based on certification alone.

== Release history ==
Country	Date	Format	Label	Ref.
Ireland	9 November 2012	Digital download (EP)	Syco	
United Kingdom	11 November 2012	Digital download (EP)	Syco	
United Kingdom	19 November 2012	CD single	Syco	
