= Move (Little Mix song) =

2013 single by Little Mix

Single by Little Mix

from the album Salute
- Released: 7 October 2013
- Recorded: 2013
- Genre: Dance-pop; R&B
- Length: 3:44
- Label: Syco
- Songwriters: Maegan Cottone; Nathan Duvall; Perrie Edwards; Jesy Nelson; Leigh-Anne Pinnock; Jade Thirlwall
- Producer: Nathan Duvall

Little Mix singles chronology
"How Ya Doin'?" (2013)	"Move" (2013)	"Little Me" (2013)

Music video
- "Move" on YouTube

"Move" is a song recorded by British girl group Little Mix. It was released through Syco Music, as the lead single from their second studio album, Salute (2013). It was co-written by members Jesy Nelson, Leigh-Anne Pinnock, Jade Thirlwall and Perrie Edwards with Maegan Cottone and Nathan Duvall, and produced by Duvall.

Musically Move has been described as a dance-pop and R&B song that sees the group move away from melody-led ventures, and features a more bass synth-oriented sound. The song received acclaim from music critics, who praised them for their approach towards new sounds compared to their previous work. It was named by Billboard as one of 100 Greatest Girl Group Songs of All Time.

The song peaked at number three on the UK Singles Chart, at number five on the Irish Singles Chart, and charted in eight other territories including Australia, France, and Japan. The group performed the song on both the Australian and American versions of The X Factor and at the Billboard studios in New York. It has been certified platinum in the UK and Brazil and certified gold in Australia.

== Background ==
"I love the structure of it – it's so different that it means you have to listen to it a few times to get your head around it." "I don't think we'd be Little Mix if we didn't take a risk. When "Wings" came out there was nothing else like it at the time – it was something a bit different – and we like doing that."

—Jade Thirlwall and Leigh-Anne Pinnock talking to MTV about the song.

Following Little Mix's debut headlining tour, they began work on their second studio album. They wrote the song wanting to show off their musical progression with mature sound. The group achieved this by allowing the song to be more production-led than their previous material.

Little Mix co-wrote "Move" with Nathan Duvall and their vocal coach, Maegan Cottone. During a livestream, the group revealed the name of their next single and Jade Thirlwall described the songwriting process as, "We all sat in the studio together and vibed and made little noises..." Lyrically, the song talks of boys who think they are too cool to dance and ultimately leads to Little Mix telling them to move.

== Critical reception ==
"Move" garnered critical acclaim from music critics. The Daily Record gave the song five out of five stars, mentioning that it contains inspiration from 90s club pop as well as being R&B-infused compared to their previous singles. It highlighted the lyrics as being "full of attitude and the trademark Little Mix harmonies and melodies, making this song a sure hit."

Robert Copsey of Digital Spy gave the track four out of five stars and wrote it "subtly blends the current pop trends with [Little Mix's] own inimitable style," also noting similarities with 1990s club music.

Idolator's Sam Lansky gave the single a positive review: "The best girl group singles are always so wonderful because they're strange, and British girl groups do that better than anyone: “Move” [...] fits the bill perfectly." Jamie Clarke of So So Gay called the song "brilliant" and wrote "the girls have strong enough vocals to sing R&B convincingly." Jon OBrien from Yahoo! UK & Ireland wrote on his review of the album that "the tongue-clacking beats and addictive harmonies of 'Move' have already signalled that the group have upped their game considerably."

Billboard named the song #92 on their list of 100 Greatest Girl Group Songs of All Time.

Attitude named the song #1 on their list of 32 greatest Little Mix singles of all time and wrote "Releasing ‘Move’ is the kind of risk we wish mainstream pop acts did more often (Cow bells?!): This R&B infused track relies less on a big catchy chorus and instead is a slinky, sexy little bop that slowly creeps up on you and once it does, becomes an unforgettable moment in pop.

== Music video ==
The official music video premiered on YouTube on 25 October 2013. The video starts with silhouettes of the band members appearing in front of brightly coloured backdrops. They are then seen in a shiny white room and Thirlwall then begins to sing the first verse. Throughout the video, the members are seen performing hip-hop style dances, with several dancers in the background. The video then moves to a large stage with bright flashing lights, where the group perform the final dance for the song.

== Track listing ==
Digital download

1. "Move" – 3:44

Remixes EP

1. "Move" (The Alias Radio Edit) – 3:44
2. "Move" (Deekly and Eightysix Remix) – 3:19
3. "Move" (Mike Delinquent Remix) – 5:29
4. "Move" (Mike Rizzo Funk Generation Radio Mix) – 3:42
5. "Move" (Over Exposure Remix) – 5:51

== Live performances ==
Little Mix performed "Move" on The X Factor Australia on 21 October 2013, The X Factor UK on 3 November 2013 Friday Download on 8 November 2013, and also performed it on The X Factor USA on 5 December 2013. The girls also performed this song live on Good Morning America on 4 February 2014 to promote the US release of Salute. On the same day, Little Mix performed the song at their Hard Rock Cafe album signing in New York City, and on Watch What Happens Live. They also performed the song on the Wendy Williams Show on 6 February 2014, it was included on the setlist for Demi Lovato's Neon Lights Tour, as one of the opening acts, and four headlining tours, The Salute Tour (2014), The Get Weird Tour (2016), The Glory Days Tour (2017), and The Summer Hits Tour (2018).

== Charts and certifications ==
Chart (2013)	Peak position
Australia (ARIA)	26
Belgium (Ultratop 50 Flanders)	37
Belgium (Ultratip Bubbling Under Wallonia)	17
Euro Digital Songs (Billboard)	4
France (SNEP)	109
Ireland (IRMA)	5
Japan Hot 100 (Billboard)	19
Japan Hot Overseas (Billboard)	1
Netherlands (Single Top 100)	76
New Zealand (Recorded Music NZ)	12
Scotland Singles (OCC)	2
Slovakia Airplay (ČNS IFPI)	73
UK Singles (OCC)	3
UK Airplay (Music Week)	8
US Bubbling Under Hot 100 (Billboard)	22
US Pop Airplay (Billboard)	38

=== Year-end charts ===
Chart (2013)	Position
UK Singles (Official Charts Company)	67

== Certifications ==
Region	Certification	Certified units/sales
Australia (ARIA)	Gold	35,000^{^}
Brazil (Pro-Música Brasil)	Platinum	60,000^{‡}
United Kingdom (BPI)	Platinum	684,000
^{^} Shipments figures based on certification alone.^{‡} Sales+streaming figures based on certification alone.

== Radio and release history ==
Region	Date	Format	Label
United Kingdom	23 September 2013	Radio impact	Syco Music
Australia	7 October 2013	Digital download	Syco Music
Ireland	7 October 2013	Digital download	Syco Music
United Kingdom	7 October 2013	Digital download	Syco Music
United States	18 February 2014	Mainstream radio	Syco; Columbia Records
