= Change Your Life (Little Mix song) =

Single by Little Mix

from the album DNA
- Released: 15 February 2013
- Genre: Pop
- Length: 3:21
- Label: Syco
- Songwriters: Richard Stannard; Tim Powell; Ash Howes; Perrie Edwards; Jesy Nelson; Leigh-Anne Pinnock; Jade Thirlwall
- Producers: Richard Stannard; Tim Powell

Little Mix singles chronology
"DNA" (2012)	"Change Your Life" (2013)	"How Ya Doin'?" (2013)

Music video
- "Change Your Life" on YouTube

"Change Your Life" is a song released by British girl group Little Mix. It was released on 15 February 2013, as the third single from their debut studio album, DNA (2012). The track was written by the group members, along with Ash Howes, and its producers Richard Stannard and Tim Powell. The single was inspired by the group own experiences while as contestants on the eighth UK series of The X Factor and their fans.

"Change Your Life" was the first song that Little Mix wrote together as a group. Described as a pop ballad, it was met with mixed reviews from critics with praise drawn towards the group's vocal performance and the song's message, while others deemed it less impactful compared to their previous singles "Wings" and "DNA". "Change Your Life" addresses self love and female empowerment, and is about overcoming personal hardships and moving on in life. The song peaked at number twelve in the UK and reached the top ten in Australia and the top twenty in Ireland. It also charted in five other countries.

The group performed the track in a recording studio in the accompanying music video and also includes backstage footage from their first two headlining tour dates. The group promoted the single with televised performances on Children in Need, Dancing on Ice, The Graham Norton Show and This Morning. The song has been performed on four of Little Mix's concert tours, the most recent being the Summer Hits Tour in 2018.

== Background and release ==
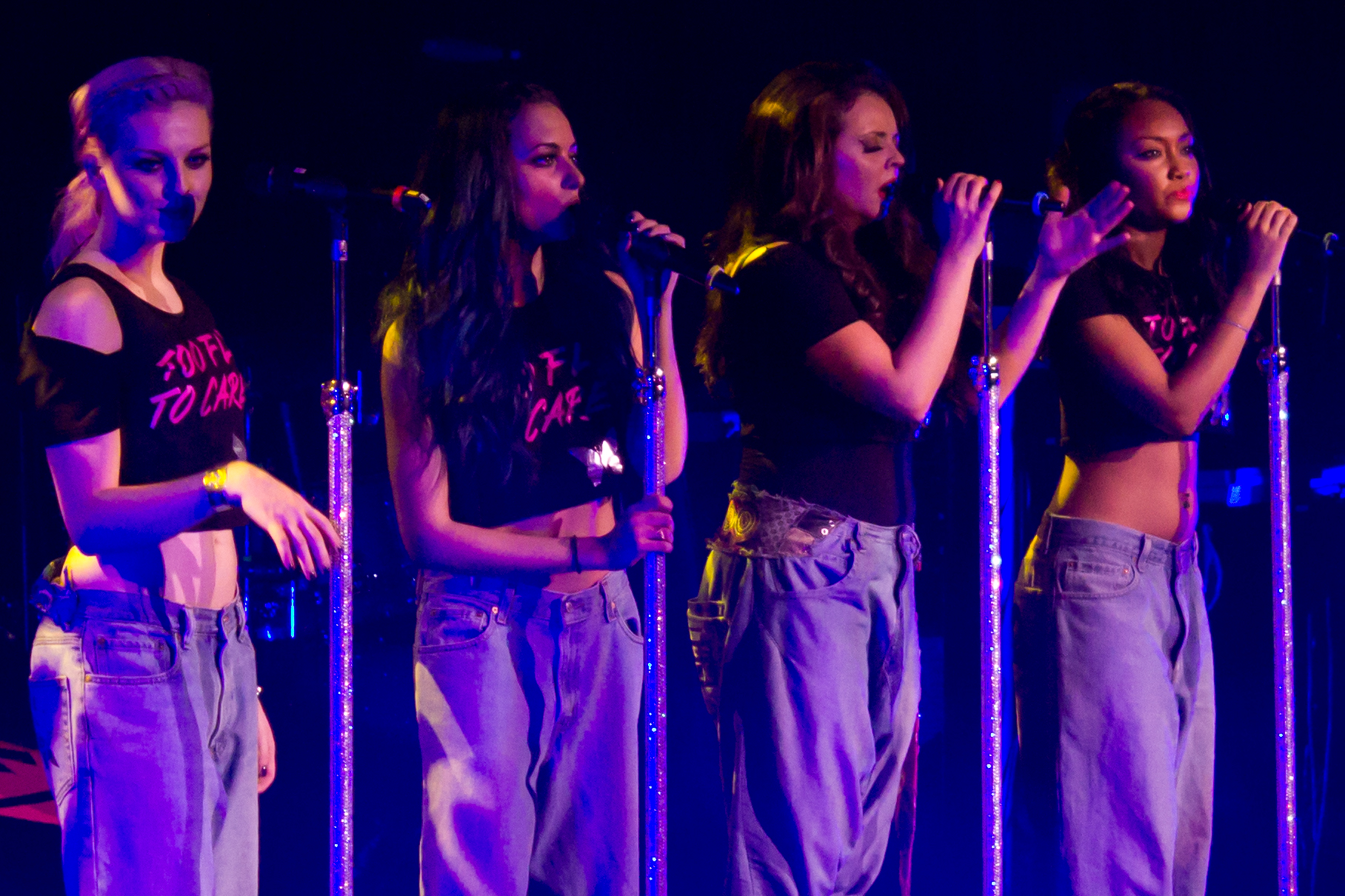
Little Mix performing the song during their 2013 DNA Tour.

Little Mix co-wrote "Change Your Life" with Richard Stannard, Tim Powell and Ash Howes. Stannard was among the first producers to work with the group during their formation on the eighth UK series of The X Factor. It was also the first song Little Mix wrote together as a group; Jade Thirlwall said "I think you can really tell that when you listen to the lyrics... We had just come out of The X Factor, we were thinking about that and thinking about the fans, so it's quite an important one."

The group travelled to Stannard's studio in Brighton for the writing session. Regarding the writing process, Thirlwall recalled, "We hadn't written as a group before so we were very nervous and excited. We sat with [Stannard] and thought of ideas, what kind of sound we wanted because at that point we didn't know anything really." It was important to the group for the track to have a strong and positive message for their fans. They wrote "Change Your Life" with a female narrative in the first verse and a male narrative in the second verse so that the song could relate to both genders.

Little Mix first shared the cover art for "Change Your Life" on Facebook on 12 December 2012. An accompanying lyric video was released on Vevo the following day. Syco Music released it as the third single from the group's debut album DNA in Ireland on 15 February 2013 and then in the UK two days later as a digital extended play (EP).

== Composition ==
"Change Your Life"
A 20-second sample of "Change Your Life", featuring Leigh-Anne Pinnock's spoken introduction, "She captures her reflection then she throws the mirror to the floor".

Composed in 4/4 time and the key of A major, "Change Your Life" is a pop ballad with a moderate tempo of 80 beats per minute. The song is constructed in a verse-chorus form, with a bridge before the third chorus. Little Mix's vocal range spans from the note of A_{3} to E_{5}. The track opens with descending piano arpeggios and a D–A/C♭–E–A chord progression, while the verses have a sequence of D–F♭m–E and mix pop vocals with prominent violin accompaniment and a brief drum and bass break before the chorus.

Both verses feature solos performed by Leigh-Anne Pinnock in a British-accented spoken rap style, Jesy Nelson who uses a soulful alto and vibrato, and Thirlwall who sings the majority of the song's lines. Perrie Edwards adds a high harmony in the second verse, a high note after the bridge, and belts "Take it all" during the harmonised chorus which features kicks and handclaps. The lyrics, according to Thirlwall are about feeling better about yourself and making something of your life. She said, "The song's called 'Change Your Life' and that's what it's about really." Nelson said the track is about "not letting people put you down and always believing in yourself".

== Reception ==
=== Critical response ===
"Change Your Life" received mixed reviews from music critics. In his review for Digital Spy, Lewis Corner gave the song four out of five stars, writing that Little Mix "reaffirm their sisterhood chemistry with pitch-perfect harmonies". Ailbhe Malone of The Irish Times said the hook "will remain in your head for longer than it ought to", and although "not as immediately impactful" as the group's previous singles "Wings" and "DNA", "by the third listen, you'll be trying to copy Jesy's soulful alto." On the other hand, Fiona Shepherd of The Scotsman wrote that the track "reprises the message of 'Wings' to lesser returns". The Guardian's Sam Wolfson derided it as "another patronising song about ignoring the haters". Dan Stubbs chose "Change Your Life" as NME's single of the week, but said it "comes out on top simply by not being quite as horrible as the others", commenting, "'You're untouchable!' it says, as you look in the mirror and puke."

=== Chart performance ===
In January 2013, "Change Your Life" debuted at number 36 on the UK Singles Chart with first-week sales of 9,019 copies. It peaked at number 12 in its third week with sales of 19,999 copies, and spent a total of nine weeks on the chart. The song was certified silver by the British Phonographic Industry (BPI), and has sold over 247,000 units in the UK, according to the Official Charts Company.

The single performed similarly in Ireland where it also peaked at number 12, a week after debuting at number 13. It fared better in Australia where it was used as the theme song for Australian reality television series House Rules, and reached number eight on the ARIA Singles Chart, making it Little Mix's second single to reach the top 10 there. The track was certified double platinum by the Australian Recording Industry Association (ARIA) for selling 140,000 copies. In New Zealand, "Change Your Life" charted at number 29 and received a gold certification from Recorded Music NZ for sales of 7,500 copies. Reflecting on the single's chart performance, Thirlwall said, "It was tricky with 'Change Your Life' because a lot of fans already had it from the album. It's hard to push songs that have been available to buy for months already."

== Music video ==
=== Development and release ===
Little Mix posing with their Vivid Imaginations doll range in a scene from the music video.

A music video for "Change Your Life" was originally filmed on 28 November 2012 in London. It was directed by Chris Sweeny and cast a gay teen couple and a bully. However, this video was scrapped in favour of one directed by Dominic O'Riordan and Warren Smith in January 2013. Thirlwall said, "we wanted it to be more about us and showcase who we are. It's a lot more mellow and real than our previous ones. We're just chilling and portraying the song and performing it how it should be. There are no fireworks or backflips, it's just us delivering a great song."

The video features product placement of Little Mix's Vivid Imaginations doll range, as well as the Samsung Galaxy Camera brokered by Starcom MediaVest's content division, Liquid Thread. It also includes cameo appearances from the group members' mothers Debbie Duffy, Janice White, Deborah Thornhill and Norma Thirlwall. The music video was scheduled to premiere on 18 January 2013, but was pushed back to 31 January 2013 to include footage from the band's first two headlining tour dates on 25 and 26 January 2013 at the Pavilion Theatre in Rhyl.

=== Synopsis and reception ===
The music video opens with casual scenes of Little Mix backstage and on a tour bus prior to performing at the Rhyl Pavilion. In another segment, they are shown performing the song in a recording studio. Other scenes include the group playing with their dolls and doing rehearsals with their dancers. During the song's bridge, the band are shown embracing their mothers, and for the final chorus, they prepare and then perform on stage. Close-up shots of fans in the audience are interspersed during their performance. The video ends with Little Mix celebrating backstage after the show.

Digital Spy's Alim Kheraj wrote, "It's a truth universally acknowledged that tour videos are a crime against pop. Luckily, Little Mix know this and instead opted for some 'behind-the-scenes' action mixed with some we're-serious-singers-in-the-studio footage".

== Live performances ==
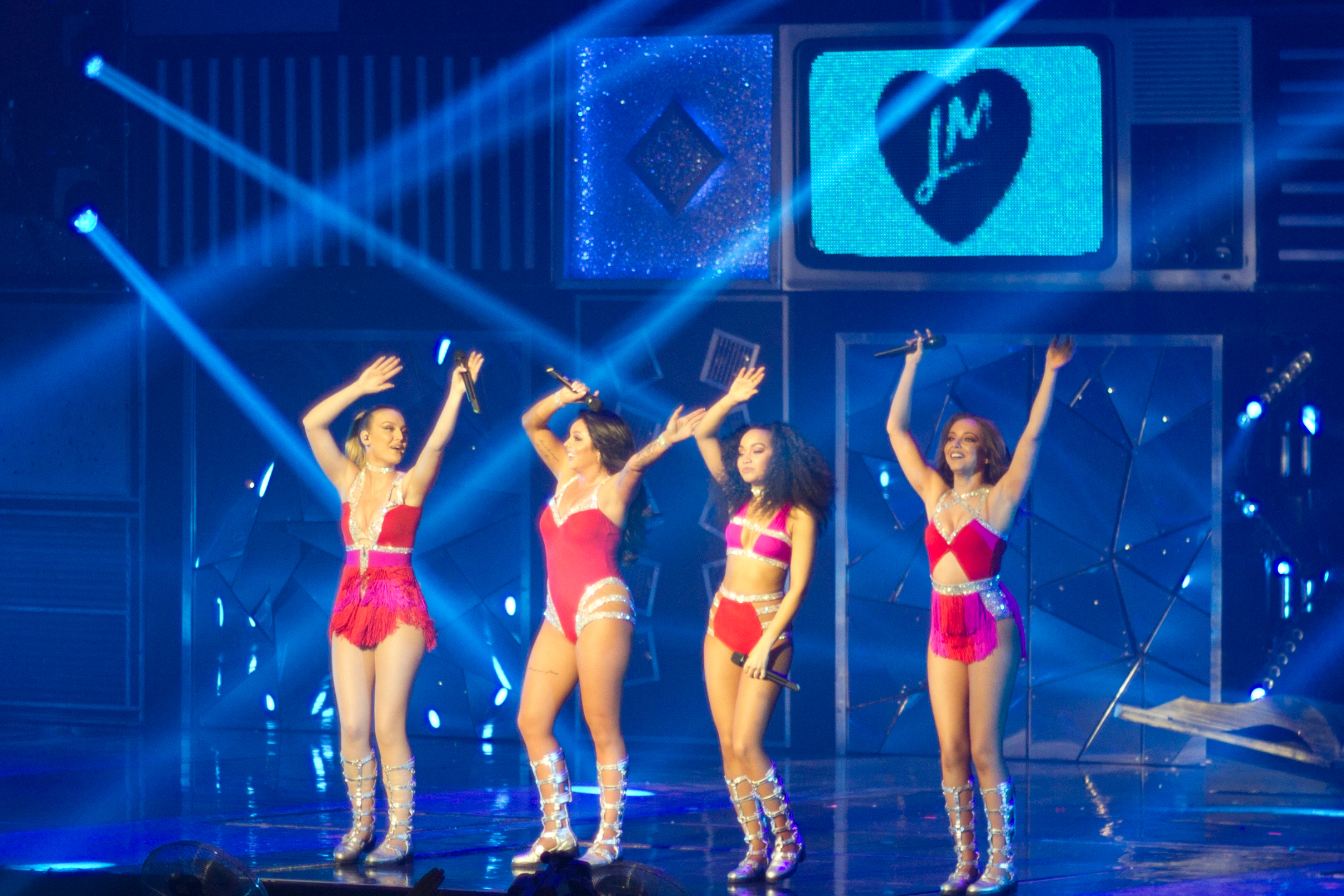
Little Mix performing "Change Your Life" on The Get Weird Tour in 2016.

Little Mix gave their first live performance of "Change Your Life" on 16 November 2012 on Children in Need. On 20 January 2013, the group performed the song on the eighth series of Dancing on Ice. On 1 February 2013, the band performed the track on The Graham Norton Show. According to Music Week, the performance helped aid a 140% increase in weekly sales of "Change Your Life" and its climb from number 31 to number 12 on the UK Singles Chart. Little Mix also performed the song on British daytime television programme This Morning on 14 February 2013, Comic Relief's Big Chat with Graham Norton on 7 March 2013, and at BBC Radio 1's Big Weekend on 26 May 2013. In Australia, they performed the track on breakfast television programme Sunrise on 22 October 2013.

During the group's 2013 DNA Tour, "Change Your Life" was performed with a live band as part of the encore. They performed the song wearing 1990s-style baggy jeans and personalised black crop tops. For their 2014 Salute Tour, the group performed the track wearing sequinned Grecian-themed outfits. During The Get Weird Tour in 2016, Little Mix performed the song in bright pink leotards and two-pieces as videos of the group meeting fans were screened above them. It was also performed as part of the setlist for the band's Summer Hits Tour in 2018.

== Personnel ==
Credits adapted from the album liner notes of DNA.

- Richard Stannard – production
- Tim Powell – production
- Serban Ghenea – mixing
- John Hanes – mix engineering
- Phil Seaford – mixing assistance
- Tom Coyne – mastering

== Track listing ==
Digital EP
No.	Title	Length
1.	"Change Your Life" (Single Mix)	3:21
2.	"Change Your Life" (Sonny J Mason Radio Mix)	4:21
3.	"Change Your Life" (Bimbo Jones Radio Edit)	2:48
4.	"Change Your Life" (Instrumental)	3:20

== Charts ==
=== Weekly charts ===
Charts (2013)	Peak position
Australia (ARIA)	8
France (SNEP)	132
Ireland (IRMA)	12
New Zealand (Recorded Music NZ)	29
Scottish Singles Sales (Official Charts)	8
Slovakia Airplay (ČNS IFPI)	60
South Korea International (Gaon)	35
UK Singles (Official Charts)	12
UK Airplay (Music Week)	20

=== Year-end chart ===
Chart (2013)	Position
Australia (ARIA)	75
UK Singles (Official Charts Company)	142

== Certifications ==
Region	Certification	Certified units/sales
Australia (ARIA)	2× Platinum	140,000^{^}
New Zealand (RMNZ)	Gold	7,500^{*}
United Kingdom (BPI)	Silver	200,000^{‡}
^{*} Sales figures based on certification alone.^{^} Shipments figures based on certification alone.^{‡} Sales+streaming figures based on certification alone.
