= How Ya Doin'? =

Single by Little Mix featuring Missy Elliott

from the album DNA
- Released: 15 April 2013
- Studio: The Sample Factory, London
- Genre: Pop; pop-rap
- Length: 3:31
- Label: Syco
- Songwriters: Darren Lewis; Iyiola Babalola; Shaznay Lewis; Perrie Edwards; Jesy Nelson; Leigh-Anne Pinnock; Jade Thirlwall; James Carter; Glenn Skinner; Ben Volpeliere-Pierrot; Julian G. Brookhouse; Nick Thorp; Miguel Drummond
- Producer: Future Cut

Little Mix singles chronology
"Change Your Life" (2013)	"How Ya Doin'?" (2013)	"Move" (2013)

Missy Elliott singles chronology
"Nobody's Perfect" (2012)	"How Ya Doin'?" (2013)	"Without Me" (2013)

Music video
- "How Ya Doin'?" on YouTube

"How Ya Doin'?" is a song by British girl group Little Mix, featuring American rapper Missy Elliott. It was released on 15 April 2013, through Syco Music as the fourth and final single from Little Mix's debut studio album, DNA (2012). "How Ya Doin" was described by critics as a pop rap track and received generally favorable reviews from critics. The chorus was taken from Curiosity Killed the Cat's 1989 single "Name and Number", with the bassline and beat coming from The Whatnauts 1981 funk song "Help Is on the Way". Both samples were used in "Ring Ring Ring (Ha Ha Hey)" by De La Soul in almost the same manner.

"How Ya Doin" peaked at number three in Hungary. It reached number 16 on the Official UK Singles Chart and in Scotland. The song also charted in Ireland, Belgium, Czech Republic, the Netherlands, Australia, and France; where it remains as the group's highest-charting single there. It has been certified Silver in the United Kingdom and gold in Australia.

== Background ==
"How Ya Doin'?" contains samples from The Whatnauts' "Help Is on the Way", composed by James Carter, and Curiosity Killed the Cat's "Name and Number", written by Glenn Skinner, Ben Volpeliere-Pierrot, Nicholas Thorp, Julian Brookhouse and Miguel Drummond. The sampling concept stemmed from Guy Langley, an artists and repertoire manager at Little Mix's then-record label Syco Music, who heard "Name and Number" at a house party. He recalled, "The girls' mantra from the start has been about referencing harmonies of bands like En Vogue; the idea of answering machines felt knowingly throwback." The chorus was based on the "Name and Number" sample, and the verses were written by Shaznay Lewis and the members of Little Mix.

Regarding the writing process, Jesy Nelson said, "We loved the whole old-school sound and wanted to bring it up to date." The band also liked the track because their parents recognised the samples, and they wanted their music to appeal to an older audience. The song was recorded at The Sampling Factory in London. When the track listing for the group's debut album DNA was announced in September 2012, it was revealed that British rapper Slick Rick would feature on "How Ya Doin'?". However, he became hesitant about the collaboration and withdrew before the album's release.

== Release ==
Little Mix announced "How Ya Doin'?" as the fourth and final single from DNA during an interview for Digital Spy on 11 March 2013. For its single release, the song was remixed to include newly recorded vocals by the group and a verse by American rapper Missy Elliott. The band's A&R management arranged the collaboration with Elliott who recorded her verse separately in Los Angeles. Nelson, who frequently cited Elliott as her "dream collaboration" in press interviews, revealed that she "cried her eyes out" when the rapper agreed to featuring on the track. She recalled, "As soon as we thought there might be a chance she'd appear on the track we did literally everything we could to make sure it happened."

The single version premiered on Capital FM on 27 March 2013 and was made available to pre-order on 5 April 2013. It was scheduled to be released on 6 May 2013, but was brought forward to a mid-week date of 15 April 2013.

== Critical reception ==
"How Ya Doin'?" (2013)
A 19 second sample of Little Mix's "How Ya Doin'?", featuring its chorus.

"How Ya Doin'?" received generally favorable reviews from music critics upon release. Robert Copsey of Digital Spy gave the song four out of five stars, writing that it "finds the group finally settling into their groove." Alim Kheraj from the same website referred to it as one of Little Mix's "most accomplished" singles and "a nostalgic song that bubbles with modernity". Billboard magazine's Jason Lipshutz commented that the band "shine most when letting some sass bleed in, like on the giddy kiss-off 'How Ya Doin'?'". Los Angeles Times critic Mikael Wood complimented the song's "up-for-anything spirit", deeming it "effervescent", and "utterly irrepressible". Jordan Sargent of Spin wrote that the track "effortlessly bursts", describing it as "glossy and in-your-face but grounded by soulful vocals". Sargent compared its sound to "Act Like You Know" by Fat Larry's Band, and music by girl groups Destiny's Child and 702, and called Elliott's feature "an inspired choice".

On the other hand, Kieran Yates of The Guardian believed Elliott upstaged Little Mix and demonstrated "the power of a good rap cameo to garner a reaction. Even if most of it was open-mouthed incredulousness." He wrote that the collaboration was "clearly the end product of a record label meeting gone awry". In his review for Clash magazine, Ghostpoet dismissed the song as "utter tripe" and "like being tied to a chair in a white-painted room with multi-coloured shit being thrown at you from every direction." NME's Jamie Fullerton derided it as an inferior version of Elliott's 1998 single "Beep Me 911" and "Jamiroquai fronting the house band on Britain's Got Talent".

== Chart performance ==
"How Ya Doin'?" debuted at number 57 on the UK Singles Chart on 20 April 2013, before ascending 24 positions to number 23 the week after. In its third week on the chart, the song climbed seven places to its peak of number 16, marking Little Mix's fifth consecutive top 20 hit in the United Kingdom. It charted for a total of seven weeks. "How Ya Doin'?" has sold a total of 110,000 copies in the UK. The single debuted at number 55 on the Irish Singles Chart on 11 April 2013. It then climbed 27 places in its third week on the chart to peak at number 26. Consequently, "How Ya Doin'?" became Little Mix's first single to miss the top 20 in Ireland, but spent a total of seven weeks on the chart. The single peaked at number 16 on the Scottish Singles Chart on 11 May 2013, marking the group's fifth consecutive top 20 hit in Scotland.

"How Ya Doin'?" was Little Mix's first single to chart in the Netherlands when it entered the Dutch Singles Chart at number 91 on 27 April 2013. The song became the group's most successful single in France to-date, when it debuted and peaked at number 66 on the French Singles Chart on 4 May 2013. It charted for a total of three weeks. On 19 May 2013, "How Ya Doin'?" debuted at number 33 on the Australian Singles Chart. After two weeks of fluctuation on the chart, it peaked at number 29 on the chart issued for 9 June 2013. The song debuted and peaked at number 33 on the Hungarian Airplay Chart on 26 May 2013. In Belgium, the song reached number 32 on the Ultratip chart in Flanders. "How Ya Doin'?" marked Little Mix's second chart appearance in the Czech Republic when it reached number 92 on the Czech Airplay Chart during the 19th week of 2013. On 20 June 2013, the song peaked at number 3 on Hungarian charts, making it the group's most successful single on that chart to date.

== Live performances ==
Little Mix performed the "How Ya Doin'?" on the Chatty Man show on 3 May, and on Sunday Brunch on 5 May 2013. On 9 May 2013, they performed the song on Daybreak. They also sang the song on their MTV Live session, and on French television programme, Le Grand Journal.

== Music video ==
Directed by Carly Cussen, the shoot was set in East London in early March 2013. Little Mix released a few teasers of the video and did a countdown for the release date. They described the video as "really colourful, really old school" with "a lot of dancing". The video was posted on 4 April 2013 on their official VEVO account. It shows the girls in different colourful sets and clothes while dancing and singing to the song. Missy Elliott is later shown in an orange outfit studded with diamonds while performing her rap verses via a telephone before teasingly cutting the phone's cord.

== Personnel ==
Credits adapted from Tidal the album liner notes of DNA.

- Perrie Edwards – vocals, songwriting
- Jesy Nelson – vocals, songwriting
- Leigh-Anne Pinnock – vocals, songwriting
- Jade Thirlwall – vocals, songwriting
- Missy Elliott – vocals
- Miguel Drummond – songwriting
- Ben Volpeleire-Pierrot – songwriting
- Glenn Francis SKinner – songwriting
- James Carter – songwriting
- Jullian Brookhouse – songwriting
- Nicholas Thorp – songwriting
- Shaznay Lewis – songwriting
- Future Cut – production, record engineering
- Darren Lewis – guitars, keys, all other instruments, songwriting
- Jacob Quistgaard – guitars
- Michael Hamilton – bass
- Iyiola Babalola – drums, songwriting
- Phil Tan – mixing
- Tom Coyne – mastering
- Daniela Rivera – additional engineering

== Charts ==
=== Weekly charts ===
Chart (2013)	Peak position
Australia (ARIA)	29
Belgium (Ultratip Bubbling Under Flanders)	32
Belgium (Ultratip Bubbling Under Wallonia)	16
Czech Republic Airplay (ČNS IFPI)	92
France (SNEP)	66
Hungary (Rádiós Top 40)	3
Ireland (IRMA)	26
Netherlands (Dutch Top 40 Tipparade)	6
Netherlands (Single Top 100)	91
Scottish Singles Sales (Official Charts)	16
Slovakia Airplay (ČNS IFPI)	61
UK Singles (Official Charts)	16
UK Airplay (Music Week)	20

=== Year-end chart ===
Chart (2013)	Position
Hungary (Rádiós Top 40)	52
UK Singles (Official Charts Company)	166

== Certifications ==
Region	Certification	Certified units/sales
Australia (ARIA)	Gold	35,000^{^}
United Kingdom (BPI)	Silver	200,000^{‡}
^{^} Shipments figures based on certification alone.^{‡} Sales+streaming figures based on certification alone.
