= LM5: The Tour Film =

2020 concert film by Little Mix

- Official Poster
- Directed by: Laurence Warder
- Produced by: Vicky Smith; Laurence Warder; Cassandra Gracey; Jason Iley; Ian Dawson; Jim Tosney
- Starring: Perrie Edwards; Leigh-Anne Pinnock; Jade Thirlwall; Jesy Nelson
- Cinematography: John Simmons
- Edited by: Johnny Richards; Chris Young
- Music by: Little Mix
- Production companies: 4th Floor Creative; Sky
- Distributed by: Trafalgar Releasing; Sony Music UK
- Release date: November 21, 2020
- Running time: 97 minutes
- Country: United Kingdom
- Language: English

LM5: The Tour Film is a 2020 concert film by British girl group Little Mix following the release of their fifth studio album LM5. The film is directed by Laurence Warder and distributed by Trafalgar Releasing. The film included performances from the final London show of the group's sixth concert tour, LM5: The Tour with special guest appearances by Stormzy and Kamille.

LM5: The Tour Film was released on 21 November 2020 in cinemas worldwide. Although screening dates for the UK & Ireland, and parts of Europe were moved to December 2020 and January 2021 respectively, due the continued impact of the COVID-19 pandemic. It was also released on iTunes, and was aired on Sky One, a few months after its initial release.

== Background ==
The film is directed by Laurence Warder, with the production handled by Vicky Smith. It was filmed during the last show of the group's sixth concert tour, LM5: The Tour, on London's O2 Arena. It was distributed by Trafalgar Releasing and was produced by Sony Music UK's 4th Floor Creative. The film includes performances of "Power" and "More Than Words" where the group is joined on stage by fellow collaborators Stormzy and Kamille respectively.

"Trafalgar Releasing are pleased to be working with 4th Floor Creative, Sony Music and the Little Mix team on the upcoming cinema release of Little Mix: LM5 – The Tour Film. After becoming one of the best-selling girl groups of all time and winning countless awards, the platform is set for their thrilling big screen debut and we look forward to welcoming fans to relive the acclaimed LM5 Tour."

— Marc Allenby, CEO for Trafalgar Releasing

== Release ==
On 8 October 2020, Little Mix announced on their social media that they will be releasing their first concert film along with the official poster. The official trailer for the film was uploaded to the Little Mix's official YouTube channel on 15 October 2020. Tickets for the film went on sale the same day. Screening dates for the UK and Ireland was rescheduled to 12 and 13 December 2020, while screening dates in some countries in Europe including France, Germany, and Belgium, was rescheduled to 16 and 17 January 2021 due to strict lockdown protocols caused by the COVID-19 pandemic. The film also aired on Sky One, a British pay television channel. In February 2021, the film was made available for purchase on iTunes.

== Reception ==
The film debuted at number 3 in the UK box office during its release week with $110.4 thousand dollars grossed. It also ranked at number 10 in Mexico, number 15 in Australia, and number 21 in New Zealand. The film grossed over $161.2 thousand in total in all four countries. making it a box office failure.

== Tracklist ==
No.	Title	Length
1.	"Salute"
2.	"Power"
3.	"Woman Like Me"
4.	"Wasabi"
5.	"Bounce Back"
6.	"Only You / Black Magic"
7.	"Told You So"
8.	"Secret Love Song, Pt, II"
9.	"The Cure"
10.	"Joan of Arc"
11.	"Wings"
12.	"Shout Out To My Ex"
13.	"Woman's World"
14.	"Reggaetón Lento (Remix)"
15.	"No More Sad Songs"
16.	"Think About Us"
17.	"More Than Words"
18.	"Touch"
Total length:		1:47:00
