= New Rules (band) =

English-Irish boy band

- Origin: England
- Genres: Pop
- Years active: 2019–present
- Labels: ALMOR Music; Elektra Records; Amuseio AB
- Members: Ryan Meaney; Nathan Lambert
- Past members: Alec Mcgarry
- Website: https://newrulesband.com/

New Rules are an English-Irish pop boy band that formed in 2019. The group is composed of vocalist Nathan Lambert and bassist and vocalist Ryan Meaney. Vocalist Alec McGarry was in the band until September 2024. In 2019, they released their debut EP New Rules through AMLOR Music.

== Career ==
Vocalists Alec McGarry, Ryan Meaney and Nathan Lambert came together in early 2019 and formed a band called New Rules. They released a promotional single titled 'Call It' in May 2019. After months of songwriting and recording, they released their debut single 'Fix Somebody' on 7 June 2019. It was featured during the fifth season of the English television series Love Island. As this single became successful, they released the official video for Fix Somebody on 26 June 2019. Shortly afterwards, their second single, 'Mountains' was released in July 2019. In October 2019, British girl-group Little Mix announced the group to be the opening acts on their UK and Ireland shows of LM5: The Tour. After the tour, they released a new single titled '24 Hours' with a music video also being released. It was then announced this was their debut single from their upcoming self-titled EP, 'New Rules'. In December 2019, they released their 4 track EP and it was made available for digital download and streaming. The second single from the EP, 'Happy Ever After You' was released in December 2019.

The band announced their debut headlining tour in 2020, playing venues across the UK and Ireland in spring 2020, with all the shows selling out. Soon after, they were announced as opening acts for Irish band Picture This' upcoming summer tour. Some of the dates of the 2020 Spring Tour were rescheduled to Summer 2021 due to the COVID-19 pandemic. They released a non-album single 'Pasta' and a promotional single called 'Look What We've Done' in April 2020. In May 2020, the band announced they were due to release a brand new single called 'Emily' but it was postponed due to the ongoing Black Lives Matter protests. Instead, they decided to release a demo of a song that was only heard on early promotional tours called 'Problem', which was only available to fans who donated to Black Lives Matter charities. Their single 'Emily' was released on 2 July 2020.

After more than one year without releasing music, they started to tease an upcoming single in their TikTok videos (fans started to recognize a pattern in their Turning Your Names Into Songs video series, as their three last videos ended with the lyrics "really wanna, really wanna, really wanna dance with you"). On September 22, 2021, they posted a short teaser video on their social media and captioned it "we really wanna, really wanna, really wanna... share some news. TOMORROW". On September 23, 2021, they announced the news of signing to Elektra Records, and later announced that their title of their latest single is called "Really Wanna Dance With You", which was released on October 1, 2021.

On the 6th of September 2024 it was announced via social media that Alec McGarry had left the band.

== Discography ==
=== Mixtapes ===
List of mixtapes
Title	Details
Go the Distance	Released: 3 June 2022; Label: Elektra Records; Format: Digital download, streaming

=== Extended plays ===
List of extended plays
Title	Details
New Rules	Released: 4 December 2019; Label: Elektra Records; Format: Digital download, streaming
Name Songs	Released: 9 February 2022; Label: Elektra Records; Format: Digital download, streaming

=== Singles ===
List of singles
Title	Year	Album
"Call It"	2019	Non-album singles
"Fix Somebody"	2019	Non-album singles
"Mountains"	2019	Non-album singles
"24 Hours"	2019	New Rules
"Happy Ever After You"	2019	New Rules
"Pasta"	2020	Go the Distance
"Look at What We've Done"	2020	Non-album singles
"Emily"	2020	Non-album singles
"My Guitar"	2020	Non-album singles
"Really Wanna Dance with You"	2021	Non-album singles
"Cheers"	2021	Non-album singles
"Go the Distance"	2022	Go the Distance
"Late in the Evening"	2022	Non-album singles
"Not Alone"	2023	Non-album singles
"Old Days"	2023	Non-album singles
"Nope!"	2023	Non-album singles
"Ghost Town"	2023	Non-album singles
"Back To The Drawing Board"	2024	Non-album singles
"ONE LESS WORRY"	2025	Non-album singles
"EYES FOR YOU"	2025	Non-album singles
"COCAINE"	2025	Non-album singles
"SPECIAL EFFECTS"	2025	Non-album singles
"UNBREAK MY HEART"	2025	Non-album singles

== Tours ==
Headlining

- New Rules 2019 Tour (2019)
- New Rules 2020 Tour (2020)

Supporting

- Little Mix - LM5: The Tour (2019)
- Julia Michaels - The Inner Monologue Tour (2019)
