= LM5: The Tour =

2019 concert tour by Little Mix

- Tour by Little Mix
- Promotional poster for the tour
- Location: Europe
- Associated album: LM5
- Start date: 16 September 2019
- End date: 22 November 2019
- Legs: 1
- No. of shows: 40
- Supporting acts: Mae Muller; New Rules; Keelie Walker
- Attendance: 400,000
- Box office: $27.6 million

Little Mix concert chronology
- Summer Hits Tour (2018); LM5: The Tour (2019); The Confetti Tour (2022)

LM5: The Tour was the third worldwide concert tour and sixth overall held by British girl group Little Mix. The tour began on 16 September 2019 at the WiZink Center, in Madrid, Spain and concluded on November 22, 2019, at The O_{2} Arena in London, England, in support of their fifth studio album, LM5 (2018).

'The LM5 Tour' received positive reviews from critics with praise given to its messages of feminism, and female empowerment. It was the group's last tour to feature former member Jesy Nelson, who parted ways with the group in December 2020. The tour consisted of 40 sold-out shows across Europe, and grossed over $27 million worldwide. Following their five sold out dates at The O_{2} Arena, in London Little Mix received an award by the O2 Arena, in recognition for their five headlined shows at the venue. They have headlined the venue a total of 12 times across from four tours, and sold over 184,000 tickets. A concert film of the tour was later released in cinemas worldwide on 21 November 2020 titled LM5: The Tour Film.

== Background ==
Little Mix announced the tour on 18 October 2018 via their Twitter account. A second round of shows was announced on 25 October 2018. However, a planned date in Aberdeen on 4 October 2019 was subsequently cancelled due to unforeseen logistical issues. An extra date was added at Porsche-Arena, Stuttgart due to popular demand at 22 September 2019. On 21 March 2019 a new date was added on the Europe leg, 28 September 2019 at Dôme de Paris, Paris. In March 2019, dates in Australia were announced. The following month, it was announced the group would co-headline the Fusion Festival UK in September, alongside Rudimental. In June 2019, the group's tour dates in Oceania were delayed, due to the release of "Bounce Back" That same month, a date in New Zealand was announced. The Oceania shows were cancelled in October.

In August 2019, it was announced that Keelie Walker would serve as a supporting act for European dates, while Mae Muller and New Rules would serve as supporting for the group's Ireland and United Kingdom dates.

During the last show at the O2 Arena in London, the full show was recorded for a concert film. On 8 October 2020, Little Mix announced on their social media that they will be releasing their first concert film titled LM5: The Tour Film together with the official poster of the film. The film premiered in cinemas worldwide on 21 November 2020.

== Critical reception ==
The LM5 Tour received positive reviews from critics with The Times giving their tour a four out of five star rating. Minnie Wright from at Daily Express said "The tour is a fiery showcase of well-meaning (and often brilliantly pitched) empowerment messaging, and throughout which the band convey an authentic unity. The bonus delight, however, comes in the form of the shining punctuating moments in which they deliver divine four-part harmonies to perfection; soft and belting numbers alike, leaving no doubt as to the talent which underpins their success.

Emily Baker from Inews gave their tour a four out of five star rating. They said "It marked the first of a sold-out three-night run at London’s O2 which many great moments promoting self love and feminism throughout the night. The LM5 tour recalls Beyonce’s most famous shows, with encouraging messages about feminism activism scattered throughout the unignorable visuals. It's clear the band want fans to see their concerts not just as a night of infectious pop, but as a movement to effect change. Whether the 9-year-old girls in light up bunny ears will take their messages on board is yet to be seen, but you have to applaud them for trying".

Laura Hernández from Okdiario, who was at the first show in Madrid, wrote "the importance of women's empowerment was present, from the beginning, at their concert". Hernández continued to highlight "the spectacular medley of "Only You" with "Black Magic" [...] so well they combined it so it looked like a single song. The lighting, the play of lights and the stage shine like never". She concluded her review by saying "after an hour and a half of a show simply brilliant, spectacular and as few have seen in Spain, the girls of Little Mix said goodbye to their Spanish audience. On numerous occasions they made it clear that they had not had such an extremely large audience so delivered for a long time. They love Spain and, once again, it has been shown that we also love them." Also about the first show of the tour, Agustín Gómez Cascales from the Spanish gay magazine Shangay, wrote that "they exceeded the expectations of most attendees with a show as entertaining as, at times, powerful".

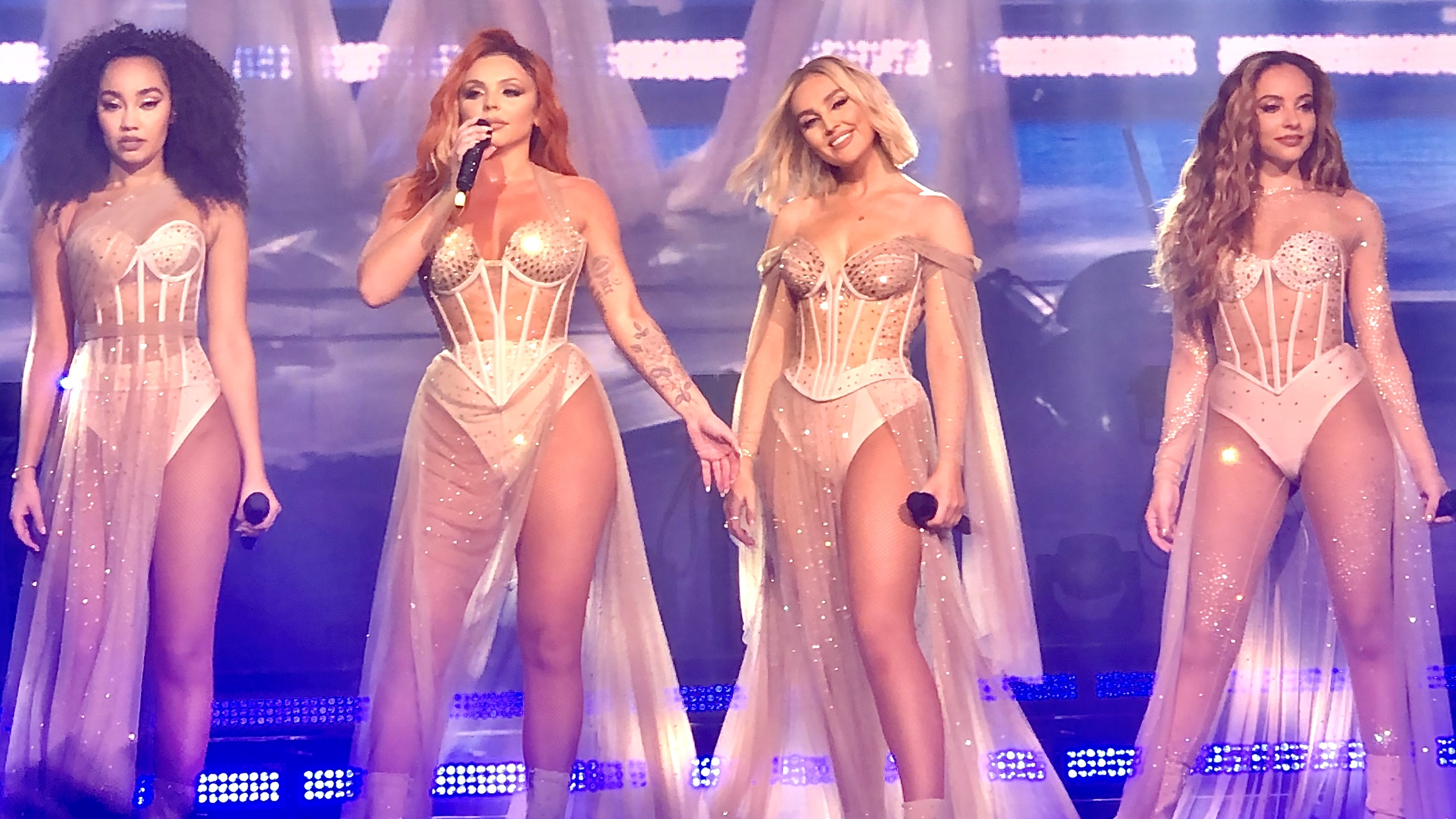
Little Mix performing in Paris, France.

Simon Duke at Chronicle Live said "Like many other pop acts, Little Mix don't get anywhere near enough credit for their vocals but any doubters should be immediately silenced by the double header of The Cure and Secret Love Song, the latter with its soaring notes as it builds to a goosebumps inducing crescendo. The epic ballad, which has now become an anthem for the LGBT+ community, provided one of the big highlights of the night as the girls flew over their captive audience as rainbow confetti burst from cannons."

Matteo Rossini from Sky TG24, attended the show in Milan, stated that "the group has set up a show where girl power and messages to support the LGBTQ+ community have been the common denominator between pop music, amazing choreographies, extraordinary vocal performances and innovative visuals with attention to the smallest details".

Sheena McStravick from Belfast Live gave the opening night of the UK and Ireland leg at Belfast a positive review, stating that "messages of female empowerment featured heavily in the show which saw the four ladies barely take a breath as they belted out hit after hit and simultaneously performed high energy dance routines keeping up with their incredible backing dancers at all times".

Nola Ojomu from Metro gave the second London show four out of five stars, stating that "the nearly two hour-long show kicked off a trio of powerful pop bangers in the form of 'Salute,' 'Power' and 'Woman Like Me.' From the moment they hit the stage, the girls dance their hearts out without messing up a single note".

== Accolades ==
On 22 November 2019, Little Mix received an award by the O2 Arena, for their five headlined shows at the venue for their LM5: The Tour. They had headlined the venue a total of 12 times from across four tours, and sold over 184,000 tickets.

On 17 January 2020, the LM5 The Tour’ dates at the SSE Hydro in Glasgow, was nominated at the SSE Live Awards 2019.

List of awards and nominations for "LM5: The Tour"
Year	Award ceremony	Category	Result	Ref.
2019	O2 Arena	12 headline shows at the O2 Arena	Won	

== Set list ==
This set list is a representation of all the concerts in the UK. After the first show of the UK leg "The Cure" and "Secret Love Song, Pt.II" were switched.

1. "The National Manthem" (Interlude)
2. "Salute"
3. "Power"
4. "Woman Like Me"
5. "Wasabi"
6. "Bounce Back"
7. "Only You" / "Black Magic"
8. "Strip" (Interlude)
9. "Told You So"
10. "Secret Love Song, Pt II"
11. "The Cure"
12. "Joan of Arc"
13. "Wings"
14. "Shout Out to My Ex"
15. "Woman's World"
16. "Forget You Not" (Interlude)
17. "Reggaetón Lento (Remix)"
18. "No More Sad Songs"
19. "Think About Us"

Encore

20. "More Than Words"
21. "Touch"

=== Notes ===
- During the third and fifth shows in London, Little Mix were joined by Stormzy to perform "Power".
- During the second, third, fourth and fifth shows in London, Little Mix were also joined by Kamille to perform "More Than Words".

== Tour dates ==
List of concerts
Date	City	Country	Venue	Supporting acts	Attendance	Revenue
16 September 2019	Madrid	Spain	WiZink Center	Keelie Walker	4,684 / 8,217	$506,824
18 September 2019	Milan	Italy	Mediolanum Forum	Keelie Walker	6,743 / 9,632	$290,640
21 September 2019	Stuttgart	Germany	Porsche-Arena	Keelie Walker	7,757 / 8,431	$450,844
22 September 2019	Stuttgart	Germany	Porsche-Arena	Keelie Walker	7,757 / 8,431	$450,844
23 September 2019	Cologne	Germany	Lanxess Arena	Keelie Walker	6,291 / 7,766	$369,941
25 September 2019	Amsterdam	Netherlands	Ziggo Dome	Keelie Walker	11,179 / 11,179	$543,762
27 September 2019	Antwerp	Belgium	Sportpaleis	Keelie Walker	13,397 / 18,869	$717,803
28 September 2019	Paris	France	Dôme de Paris	Keelie Walker	4,252 / 5,451	$250,204
6 October 2019	Belfast	Northern Ireland	SSE Arena	Mae Muller; New Rules	30,371 / 30,371 (Note: Attendance and box office score data combined for shows on 6-7 and 13-14 and October, 2019.)	$2,020,260
7 October 2019	Belfast	Northern Ireland	SSE Arena	Mae Muller; New Rules	30,371 / 30,371	$2,020,260
8 October 2019	Dublin	Ireland	3Arena	Mae Muller; New Rules	36,975 / 38,515	$2,318,348
10 October 2019	Dublin	Ireland	3Arena	Mae Muller; New Rules	36,975 / 38,515	$2,318,348
11 October 2019	Dublin	Ireland	3Arena	Mae Muller; New Rules	36,975 / 38,515	$2,318,348
13 October 2019	Belfast	Northern Ireland	SSE Arena	Mae Muller; New Rules	—	—
14 October 2019	Belfast	Northern Ireland	SSE Arena	Mae Muller; New Rules	—	—
17 October 2019	Glasgow	Scotland	SSE Hydro	Mae Muller; New Rules	35,099 / 35,099	$2,585,000
18 October 2019	Glasgow	Scotland	SSE Hydro	Mae Muller; New Rules	35,099 / 35,099	$2,585,000
19 October 2019	Glasgow	Scotland	SSE Hydro	Mae Muller; New Rules	35,099 / 35,099	$2,585,000
21 October 2019	Liverpool	England	M&S Bank Arena	Mae Muller; New Rules	19,099 / 19,099	$1,298,181
22 October 2019	Liverpool	England	M&S Bank Arena	Mae Muller; New Rules	19,099 / 19,099	$1,298,181
24 October 2019	Newcastle	England	Utilita Arena Newcastle	Mae Muller; New Rules	27,275 / 28,199	$1,891,490
25 October 2019	Newcastle	England	Utilita Arena Newcastle	Mae Muller; New Rules	27,275 / 28,199	$1,891,490
26 October 2019	Newcastle	England	Utilita Arena Newcastle	Mae Muller; New Rules	27,275 / 28,199	$1,891,490
28 October 2019	Sheffield	England	FlyDSA Arena	Mae Muller; New Rules	22,626 / 23,816	$1,451,282
29 October 2019	Sheffield	England	FlyDSA Arena	Mae Muller; New Rules	22,626 / 23,816	$1,451,282
31 October 2019	London	England	The O_{2} Arena	Mae Muller; New Rules	45,997 / 48,248	$3,399,130
1 November 2019	London	England	The O_{2} Arena	Mae Muller; New Rules	45,997 / 48,248	$3,399,130
2 November 2019	London	England	The O_{2} Arena	Mae Muller; New Rules	45,997 / 48,248	$3,399,130
7 November 2019	Birmingham	England	Resorts World Arena	Mae Muller; New Rules	36,041 / 38,337	$2,245,175
8 November 2019	Birmingham	England	Resorts World Arena	Mae Muller; New Rules	36,041 / 38,337	$2,245,175
9 November 2019	Birmingham	England	Resorts World Arena	Mae Muller; New Rules	36,041 / 38,337	$2,245,175
11 November 2019	Nottingham	England	Motorpoint Arena	Mae Muller; New Rules	14,273 / 15,024	$952,546
12 November 2019	Nottingham	England	Motorpoint Arena	Mae Muller; New Rules	14,273 / 15,024	$952,546
14 November 2019	Manchester	England	Manchester Arena	Mae Muller; New Rules	40,714 / 40,714	$2,837,170
15 November 2019	Manchester	England	Manchester Arena	Mae Muller; New Rules	40,714 / 40,714	$2,837,170
16 November 2019	Manchester	England	Manchester Arena	Mae Muller; New Rules	40,714 / 40,714	$2,837,170
18 November 2019	Leeds	England	First Direct Arena	Mae Muller; New Rules	19,858 / 21,603	$1,378,170
19 November 2019	Leeds	England	First Direct Arena	Mae Muller; New Rules	19,858 / 21,603	$1,378,170
21 November 2019	London	England	The O_{2} Arena	Mae Muller; New Rules	29,547 / 31,776	$2,123,700
22 November 2019	London	England	The O_{2} Arena	Mae Muller; New Rules	29,547 / 31,776	$2,123,700
Total					412,178 / 440,256 (93%)	$27,630,470

=== Cancelled shows ===
List of cancelled shows
Date	City	Country	Venue	Reason	Ref.
19 September 2019	Vienna	Austria	Wiener Stadthalle	Accident involving production truck	
4 October 2019	Aberdeen	Scotland	Aberdeen Exhibition and Conference Centre	Unforeseen logistical issues	
7 December 2019	Perth	Australia	RAC Arena	Working on new music	
10 December 2019	Adelaide	Australia	Adelaide Entertainment Centre	Working on new music	
13 December 2019	Melbourne	Australia	Melbourne Arena	Working on new music	
14 December 2019	Sydney	Australia	Qudos Bank Arena	Working on new music	
16 December 2019	Brisbane	Australia	Brisbane Entertainment Centre	Working on new music	
19 December 2019	Auckland	New Zealand	Spark Arena	Working on new music	
