= Shout Out to My Ex =

2016 single by Little Mix

Single by Little Mix

from the album Glory Days
- Released: 16 October 2016
- Recorded: 2015
- Genre: Dance-pop
- Length: 4:07
- Label: Syco
- Songwriters: Chris Dunn; Edvard Førre Erfjord; Camille Purcell; Iain James; Perrie Edwards; Jesy Nelson; Leigh-Anne Pinnock; Jade Thirlwall
- Producer: Electric

Little Mix singles chronology
"Hair" (2016)	"Shout Out to My Ex" (2016)	"Touch" (2016)

Music video
- "Shout Out to My Ex" on YouTube

"Shout Out to My Ex" is a song by British girl group Little Mix, released on 16 October 2016 through Syco Music and Columbia Records, as the lead single from the group's fourth studio album Glory Days (2016). A dance-pop song, it was co-written by group members Leigh-Anne Pinnock, Jade Thirlwall, Perrie Edwards, and Jesy Nelson, with lyrics referencing the downfall of a relationship at the expense of a cheating ex. The song is cited as a girl power and breakup anthem.

"Shout Out to My Ex" received positive reviews from music critics, for its empowering message, the song's production and the group's vocal performances. It was included on various end of year lists of best pop and single releases from that year. The song spent three consecutive weeks at number one on the UK Singles Chart, becoming the only UK number one of that year to be led by a female act. It became the group's first track to be certified double and triple platinum in the country and holds the record for the most streamed girl group single and is the second best selling girl group single.

The single also peaked at number one in Ireland and Scotland and topped the official Big Top 40 and Euro Digital Sales Charts, and reached the top ten in New Zealand and Australia. It charted in twenty three other territories and reached number sixty nine on the US Billboard Hot 100. At the 37th Brit Awards Ceremony, the group won British Single of the Year. It remains as one of the group's most commercially successful songs.

== Background and release ==
Prior to the single's announcement, the artwork and lyrics were leaked online. Little Mix announced the song's title and revealed the artwork on October 9, 2016, on Twitter and Instagram, also announcing that the song will be performed for the first time on their formation show The X Factor (UK). The song was released globally following their performance after the show.

After "Shout Out To My Ex" was released, speculation had surfaced about the song's lyrics being inspired by the breakup of Perrie Edwards and Zayn Malik, whose relationship had ended in 2015. The rumours were speculated even more after the music video features a scene with man who shares a similar resemblance to the singer. The original lyrics to the song were also altered and shared references to who some believed were aimed at Gigi Hadid, Malik's new partner. The original version included explicit lyrics which were changed.

Following the release of the song, Little Mix were accused of copying the song "Ugly Heart", which had been released by the British-American-Canadian girl group G.R.L., in 2014. On social media, some people had pointed out some similarities between both of the songs and the accusations resulted in a hashtag trending on twitter called "#ShoutOutToUglyHeart". The group denied the accusations during a radio station in Belgium when band member Jade Thirlwall commented "how every song is going to have a similar chord and sequence, with slightly similar lyrics and melodies. It happens all the time".

== Composition and production ==
"Shout Out To My Ex" was written by group members Leigh-Anne Pinnock, Perrie Edwards, Jade Thirlwall, and Jesy Nelson, alongside Chris Dunn, Edvard Førre Erfjord, Camille Purcell, Iain James, Henrik Michelsen and produced by Electric. Critics described the song as a dance-pop and power-pop song with lyrics about moving on after a relationship comes to an ends and moving forward in life towards better things, while leaving the past where it should be. It has since been regarded as a girl power and breakup anthem.

According to sheet music published by Sony/ATV Music Publishing on Musicnotes.com, "Shout Out to My Ex" is composed in the key of F major and set in common time at a moderate tempo of 126 beats per minute. Little Mix's voices range from F_{3} to a high A_{5}.

== Critical reception ==
"Shout Out To My Ex" received positive reviews when released with Billboard describing it as "the ultimate girl-power anthem". Renowned for Sound's Michael Smith described it as a "dance pop track" and gave praise to their vocals and how the vocalising near the climax of the song was a highlight. Idolator's Rachel Sonis described the song as a "kiss-off anthem at its finest" and remarked that it felt like "a confident comeback for the group". Emilee Linder from Fuse said that the song was a "Taylor Swift–like move to play into the media's narrative", and praised Perrie's "husky vocals".

Attitude ranked the song #9 on their list of 32 greatest Little Mix singles writing "although it has a very simple pop formula, the blissful chorus still works as that fist-pumping earworm." Metro Weekly's Hugh McIntyre described the song as "pop perfection" and listed it as also one of the best tracks of the past decade.

== Chart performance ==
"Shout Out to My Ex" debuted at number one on the UK Singles Chart, with 95,000 combined sales to give the band their fourth UK number one of their careers, following "Cannonball" in 2011, "Wings" in 2012 and "Black Magic" in 2015. It was the third single from 2016 to debut straight in at the top of the UK charts with only four days of sales tracking. "Shout Out to My Ex" was also the first UK number one single of 2016 with a female lead, as the three women with number one singles earlier in the year, Kyla, MØ and Halsey, were all featured artists. It remained at number one the following week, making it Little Mix's second song (after "Black Magic") to spend multiple weeks at number one. It was certified silver by the BPI for selling over 200,000 copies in its second week. It spent a third week before being replaced by "Rockabye" by Clean Bandit. In 2016, it was ranked as the 39th biggest single in the United Kingdom, and ranked as the second-best selling girl group single (with combined sales and streams). Between 2010 and 2019, "Shout Out to My Ex" song was ranked as the eighty-six biggest song of the decade in the United Kingdom.

As of 2021, it is the group's best-selling single, as well as the second-best selling girl group single released in the United Kingdom, behind "Wannabe", by the Spice Girls. It was their first single to be certified triple platinum in the UK and holds the record for the most streamed girl group song in the country with over 230 million streams.

Outside of the United Kingdom, it debuted at number six in Ireland and in its second week reached number one, making it Little Mix's third number-one single there, following "Cannonball" and "Wings". It also reached number one in Scotland. It peaked in the top ten of the charts in both Australia and New Zealand. In New Zealand, it became the group's highest-charting song there and their first top ten single. In Australia, it debuted at number 16 on the Australian ARIA Charts, and in its second week rose 12 places to number four. This made it Little Mix's second top-five single in Australia, following "Wings", which peaked at number three.

"Shout Out to My Ex" was the highest peak for a Little Mix song in many European countries. In the US, the song debuted at number four on the Bubbling Under Hot 100 Singles chart. The following week, it debuted on the Billboard Hot 100 at number 69, making it the group's last single to chart there. It also reached number 30 on the Digital Songs chart, Little Mix's highest placing on that particular list to date. It charted inside the top thirty in a total of nine other countries including Austria, Finland, and Canada, where it debuted at number 37 on the Canadian Hot 100, becoming their first top 40 single there. It would go on to chart in eleven other countries including the Netherlands and Germany.

== Music video ==
The music video for "Shout Out To My Ex" was filmed at the Tabernas Desert in Spain, and was released at 12:00 BST on 20 October 2016 on Vevo. Directed by Sarah Chatfield, it sees the members hanging out at a trailer and later chilling around the poolside. They are seen driving through a desert in a pink classic Cabriolet from the 70s along a highway lined with lavender-coloured trees. They drive pass a hitch-hiker who some speculate shares a resemblance to Zayn Malik, who dated Perrie Edwards before their split in 2015.

Edwards, Pinnock, Nelson, and Edwards proceed to throw away the gifts they received from their exes to the curb. The group then reunites for a group hug in a show of girl power and unity, and hold hands walking towards to pink sunset to finish. Filming took place in June 2016 whilst the girls were on their Get Weird Tour. As of 2026, it has been streamed over 500 million times on YouTube.

== Live performances ==
"Shout Out to My Ex" received its debut performance on the second results show of The X Factor in 2016, in which the group started in a car outside its recording studios, flanked by female cheerleaders in T-shirts with the names of male and female exes on them, which the cheerleaders removed towards the end of the song. On 21 October 2016, they performed the song on the Belgian TV show Jonas & Van Geel. Two days later, they performed the song on the Radio 1 Teen Awards. They also made an appearance and performed the single on the Norwegian program Senkveld on November 3. On November 13, they gave a performance on the Australian TV show, Sunrise, and performed the next day for the semi-final week of The X Factor Australia. Four days later, they performed the single on BBC's Children In Need, and two days later gave an acoustic performance on Sunday Brunch. Then, they gave a performance on The X Factor Italy on 24 November. On December 1, the group took to the LOS40 Music Awards stage and performed their hit single. They performed the song on The Today Show in 2016, and later again in 2017. An unplugged performance was delivered for Paper Magazine in January 2017. They also performed the song acoustically on iHeart Radio's Honda Stage on 2 February 2017.

In March 2017, the group performed a mashup of "Shout Out to My Ex" and "Touch" on the Nickelodeon Kids' Choice Awards, where they altered the lyrics of "Touch" to make it more kid-friendly. On 22 February, Little Mix kicked off the Brit Awards by giving a fiery performance of the song. The members, who were carried to the stage on huge silver platforms, all had blonde wigs and wore futuristic black and silver outfits, while the stage was lit in a hot-pink color.

They gave another performance of the song on the Radio 1 Teen Awards in 2018. In August 2020, Little Mix held a virtual concert called Little Mix Uncancelled where they performed some of their hits, including "Shout Out to My Ex".

Over the years, the group has performed the song in many music festivals, like the Jingle Bell Ball in 2016 and 2018, the Summertime Ball in 2017, the Fusion Festival in 2017 and 2019, the Big Weekend festival in 2017 and 2019, and the Popspring festival in 2018. Little Mix has also included "Shout Out to My Ex" on every single tour set list since its release — the Dangerous Woman Tour in 2017, where the group supported Ariana Grande in North America; the Summer Shout Out Tour in 2017, where the song served as the final number; The Glory Days Tour (2017–2018), where they performed the song as an encore while wearing black t-shirts with the word "Ex" written in silver glitter; the Summer Hits Tour in 2018, where it was the last song before the encore; the LM5 Tour in 2019; and The Confetti Tour in 2022, where it was the first song on the set list. Since the tour was held after Nelson's departure from the group in 2020, Thirlwall covered Nelson's verse.

== Accolades ==
=== Rankings ===
Publication	Accolade	Rank	Ref.
Billboard	Best Pop Songs of 2016	—N/a	
BuzzFeed	31 Iconic Songs	4	
Official Charts	Most Streamed UK Songs	—N/a	
Digital Spy	Best Pop Songs of 2016	3	
Seventeen	Best Breakup Songs	—N/a	
Teen Vogue	Best Breakup Songs	4	
Stereogum	Top Pop Songs Of 2016	—N/a	
Official Charts	Biggest Tracks Of 2016	—N/a	
BuzzFeed	84 Best Breakup Songs	—N/a	
Big Top 40	20 Best Pop Songs Of 2016	2	
Teen Vogue	Best Pop Songs Of 2016	11	
Glamour	33 Breakup Songs Ranked	—N/a	
Women's Health	The 50 Best Breakup Songs	—N/a	
The Independent	The 22 greatest kiss-off songs	7	
Parade	Get Over Your Big Split With the 100 Best Breakup Songs Ever	—N/a	
Best Life	The 100 Best Breakup Songs of All Time	—N/a	
Marie Claire	The 70 Best Breakup Songs of All Time	—N/a	
Daily Record	Favourite break-up songs revealed	27	
Official Charts	UK's most streamed songs by female artists	19	
Official Charts	Biggest songs by female artists this decade	24	
Yardbarker	The 25 best songs about breakups	—N/a	
People	14 of the Most Savage Breakup Anthems of All Time	5	

=== Industry awards ===
Publication	Accolade	Result	Ref.
Official Charts Awards	Official Charts Awards for Official Singles Chart Number One	Won	
The Official Big Top 40	Official Big Top 40 Charts Number One Award	Won	
Brit Awards	British Single of the Year	Won	
Radio Disney Music Awards	Best Break-Up Song	Won	
Teen Choice Awards	Choice Song: Group	Nominated	
Myx Music Awards	Favourite International Video	Nominated	

== Charts ==
=== Weekly charts ===
Chart (2016)	Peak position
Australia Digital Song Sales (Billboard)	2
Australia (ARIA)	4
Austria (Ö3 Austria Top 40)	24
Belgium (Ultratop 50 Flanders)	13
Belgium (Ultratip Bubbling Under Wallonia)	11
Canada Hot 100 (Billboard)	37
CIS Airplay (TopHit)	159
Czech Republic Airplay (ČNS IFPI)	23
Czech Republic Singles Digital (ČNS IFPI)	22
Denmark (Tracklisten)	36
Euro Digital Song Sales (Billboard)	1
Finland Download (Latauslista)	21
France (SNEP)	106
Germany (GfK)	52
Hungary (Rádiós Top 40)	21
Hungary (Single Top 40)	18
Ireland (IRMA)	1
Italy (FIMI)	41
Japan Hot 100 (Billboard)	42
Japan Hot Overseas (Billboard)	2
Mexico Ingles Airplay (Billboard)	10
Netherlands (Dutch Top 40)	35
Netherlands (Single Top 100)	26
New Zealand (Recorded Music NZ)	7
Norway (VG-lista)	19
Portugal (AFP)	28
Scottish Singles Sales (Official Charts)	1
Slovakia Singles Digital (ČNS IFPI)	16
Slovenia (SloTop50)	41
Spain (Promusicae)	18
Sweden (Sverigetopplistan)	38
Switzerland (Schweizer Hitparade)	49
UK Singles (Official Charts)	1
US Billboard Hot 100	69

=== Year-end charts ===
Chart (2016)	Position
Australia (ARIA)	75
UK Singles (Official Charts Company)	39
Chart (2017)	Position
UK Singles (Official Charts Company)	74

=== Decade-end charts ===
Chart (2010–2019)	Position
UK Singles (OCC)	86

== Certifications ==
Region	Certification	Certified units/sales
Australia (ARIA)	3× Platinum	210,000^{‡}
Belgium (BRMA)	Gold	10,000^{‡}
Brazil (Pro-Música Brasil)	3× Platinum	180,000^{‡}
Canada (Music Canada)	Platinum	80,000^{‡}
Denmark (IFPI Danmark)	Platinum	90,000^{‡}
Germany (BVMI)	Gold	200,000^{‡}
Italy (FIMI)	Gold	25,000^{‡}
Mexico (AMPROFON)	Gold	30,000^{‡}
New Zealand (RMNZ)	3× Platinum	90,000^{‡}
Norway (IFPI Norway)	Platinum	60,000^{‡}
Poland (ZPAV)	Gold	10,000^{‡}
Spain (Promusicae)	Gold	30,000^{‡}
Switzerland (IFPI Switzerland)	Platinum	30,000^{‡}
United Kingdom (BPI)	4× Platinum	2,400,000
^{‡} Sales+streaming figures based on certification alone.

== Release history ==
Region	Date	Format	Label	Ref.
Italy	16 October 2016	Contemporary hit radio	Sony	
United States	24 January 2017	Contemporary hit radio	Columbia	
