= Joan of Arc (Little Mix song) =

2018 promotional single by Little Mix

Promotional single by Little Mix

from the album LM5
- Released: 2 November 2018
- Genre: Trap-pop; hip hop
- Length: 3:11
- Label: Syco
- Songwriters: Leigh-Anne Pinnock; Jade Thirlwall; Patrick Patrikios; Philip Plested; Alexandra Shungudzo Govere
- Producer: Loosechange

"Joan of Arc" is a song recorded by British girl group Little Mix, and appears as the sixth track on their fifth album LM5 (2018). It was released on 2 November 2018 as the album's first promotional single. It was written by group members Leigh-Anne Pinnock and Jade Thirlwall, along with Loosechange handling the production.

Musically, the song is a trap-inflected track with hip hop drum beats, with elements of urban and pop rap. It received positive reviews from critics with praise given to its message about feminism and women's empowerment. Lyrically, the song discusses themes of female empowerment, independence, and self-love with lyrics referencing Joan of Arc and Stan culture.

A music video for the song was filmed however for reasons it was never disclosed to the public. They first teased the song on their Instagram account in the middle of August the same year. Joan Of Arc charted in Australia, Ireland, New Zealand and the UK and has since been certified gold in Brazil. In 2022, it was ranked as Little Mix's thirteen biggest selling non single in the UK.

== Background and release ==
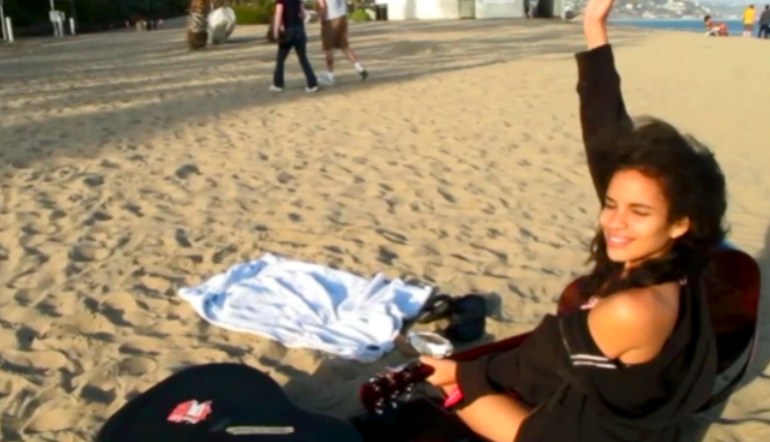
Alexandra Shungudzo Govere (pictured) co-wrote the song.

"Joan of Arc" was written by Leigh-Anne Pinnock, Jade Thirlwall, Hanni Ibrahim, Patrick Patrikios, Philip Plested and Alexandra Shungudzo Govere and Loosechange who handled the production. It was recorded on June 8, 2018, and was released as the first promotional single for their fifth studio album LM5 (2018). It was then mixed by Wez Clarke and then mastered by Randy Merrill.

== Composition and lyrics ==
"Joan of Arc" is a trap-pop song that contains bouncy hip hop drum beats that runs for three minutes and eleven seconds. Direct Lyrics went as far as to call it an "urban-pop song with a little Caribbean-esque just in the middle." It contains pop-rap verses, with a thudding bassline full of snaps and hard finger clicks. Lyrically, it contains themes and messages of female empowerment and independence. Pinnock raps the lyrics "One foot in the club, everybody watch me. One pop of that booty, everybody love me. Ain't the reason I'm cocky. I make myself feel sexy," over a "scrizzy synths."

== Live performances ==
Little Mix performed the song live for the first time at an album launch show for Apple Music on 13 November 2018 in London. The song became part of the setlist of the group's sixth concert tour, LM5: The Tour, in 2019.

== Critical reception ==
Idolator called the song a "fiercely feminist anthem", and a "undeniable banger". They also mentioned the similarities from their songs from their fourth studio album Glory Days (2016). Brooke Bajgrowicz from Billboard mentioned that "The girls continue to fiercely proclaim their independence."

Rolling Stone UK called the song as a empowering sassy, and trap-pop track thats sees the group celebrating independence above a bouncy, trap-inflected beat. Billboard described it as a girl power bop with the girls continuing to proclaim their independence."

Cosmopolitan included the song on their list of 20 Songs Perfect for Your Masturbation Playlist.

== Charts ==
Chart (2018)	Peak position
Australia (ARIA)	135
Ireland (IRMA)	63
New Zealand Hot Singles (RMNZ)	14
Scotland Singles (Official Charts)	35
UK Singles (Official Charts)	61

== Certifications ==
Region	Certification	Certified units/sales
Brazil (Pro-Música Brasil)	Gold	20,000^{‡}
^{‡} Sales+streaming figures based on certification alone.
