= Summer Hits Tour =

2018 concert tour by Little Mix

Summer Hits Tour 2018
- British tour by Little Mix
- Location: Europe
- Start date: 6 July 2018
- End date: 29 July 2018
- Legs: 1
- No. of shows: 15
- Attendance: 320,082
- Box office: $21,618,093 (7 shows)

Little Mix concert chronology
- The Glory Days Tour (2017-2018); Summer Hits Tour 2018 (2018); LM5: The Tour (2019)

The Summer Hits Tour 2018 was the first stadium tour by British girl group Little Mix. It began on 6 July 2018 in East Sussex, England, and concluded on 29 July 2018 in Inverness, Scotland. The group performed at fifteen shows across England, Wales, and Scotland and grossed over $10.4 million worldwide, and sold over 150,000 tickets through seven confirmed shows. British boy group Rak-Su and Australian music trio Germein was announced as support acts.

== Background ==
The tour was announced on 27 November 2017, with 15 stadium shows. The tickets went on sale 30 November.

On 21 May 2018, Capital FM reported that the Swansea, Hull, Bolton and Huddersfield shows were sold out. Clare Youell from Essex Live reported on 4 July 2018 that the Colchester show was sold out. Tim Redigolo from Northampton Chronicle & Echo add that the concert in Northampton sold out in six hours.

== Critical reception ==
David Bennun of Metro gave the concert at Hove, County Cricket Ground, four out of five stars, writing: "They breezed through their catalogue of singles in the most joyous and refreshing way. Sometimes, you don’t need to innovate. You just need to be fun and good" and add "this was all about songs, voices and personality; Little Mix are well equipped with all three". Lauren Hockney of the East Anglian Daily Times gave a positive review to Little Mix's show in Colchester, stating that "their harmonies were slick and the range in their voices, Perrie’s in particular, was impressive". Susie Beever of Examiner Live praised the Huddersfield show saying that "Little Mix’s good-humoured and fun-filled festival was the perfect way to start the summer. But what was perhaps most captivating, and sets the band apart from so many generic and manufactured pop artists, was the message they brought", adding: "Granted, John Smith’s Stadium is no Wembley. But with big voices and even bigger personalities, Little Mix turned what was a small-budget concert into the biggest party Huddersfield has seen in a very long time."

Jessica Long of Norwich Evening News stated that "with strength, sass and unity, Little Mix really did bring girl power to Norwich." Katie Davis of Kent Online review the Maidstone show, declaring that the group "put on a thrilling show that even got dragged-along-dads dancing" also add that "with an estimated 30,000 people there, squeals and shouts were definitely not in short supply - but this just added to the atmosphere and was a clear indicator of just how popular the band has become". Simon Duke of Chronicle Live gave five stars to the Gateshead show stating: "I say this every time I see Little Mix, but just as their albums sell more copies every time, their concerts get all the more impressive". David Pollock of The Scotsman wrote, about the Falkirk show, that Little Mix "were bright and entertaining, their show a well targeted blend of pop hooks, only very lightly broached adult themes and the confident assurance of positive role models. Their costumes and set bore a bright retro-futurist aesthetic, with one foot in the 1980s and one firmly in the present."

== Setlist ==
This set list is from the show on 6 July 2018 in Hove. It is not intended to represent all concerts for the tour.

1. "Touch"
2. "Reggaetón Lento (Remix)"
3. "How Ya Doin'?"
4. "Love Me Like You"
5. "Hair"
6. "Little Me"
7. "No More Sad Songs"
8. "Wings"
9. "Change Your Life"
10. "Move"
11. "Black Magic"
12. "Salute"
13. "Only You"
14. "Shout Out To My Ex"

Encore

15. "Secret Love Song, Pt II"
16. "Power"

== Tour dates ==
List of concerts, showing date, town/city, country, venue, tickets sold, number of available tickets and amount of gross revenue
Date	Town/City	Country	Venue	Opening acts	Attendance	Revenue
United Kingdom
6 July 2018	Hove	England	The 1st Central County Ground	Rak-Su Germein	—	—
7 July 2018	Swansea	Wales	Liberty Stadium	Rak-Su Germein	25,596 / 25,596	$1,783,054
8 July 2018	Colchester	England	JobServe Community Stadium	Rak-Su Germein	10,000	—
12 July 2018	Northampton	England	County Ground	Rak-Su Germein	—	—
13 July 2018	Hull	England	KCOM Craven Park	Rak-Su Germein	21,142 / 21,142	$1,356,751
14 July 2018	Bolton	England	Macron Stadium	Rak-Su Germein	29,414 / 29,414	$1,996,133
15 July 2018	Huddersfield	England	John Smith's Stadium	Rak-Su Germein	28,163 / 28,163	$1,967,899
19 July 2018	Derby	England	The 3AAA County Ground	Rak-Su Germein	—	—
20 July 2018	Lincoln	England	Lincolnshire Showground	Rak-Su Germein	—	—
21 July 2018	Norwich	England	Earlham Park	Rak-Su Germein	14,104 / 14,104	$901,774
22 July 2018	Maidstone	England	Kent Event Centre	Rak-Su Germein	30,000	—
26 July 2018	Gateshead	England	Gateshead International Stadium	Rak-Su Germein	20,675 / 20,675	$1,434,495
27 July 2018	Falkirk	Scotland	Falkirk Stadium	Rak-Su Germein	21,000	—
28 July 2018	Aberdeen	Scotland	AECC Outdoors	Rak-Su Germein	15,488 / 15,488	$1,000,117
29 July 2018	Inverness	Scotland	Bught Park	Rak-Su Germein	—	—
Total					154,582	$10,440,223
