= List of biggest-selling British music artists =

This list documents Britain's best-selling music artists alphabetically as well as by record sales. This page lists those artists who have had claims of over one million or more records in sales. The list is divided into numerous record-sales brackets within each of which, artists are listed in alphabetical order, rather than by number of records sold. The artists on the list are supported by third-party reliable sources, the sales-figures within which should represent a total number of sold albums, singles, compilation-albums, music videos as well as downloads of singles and full-length albums. This list holds no account of sales after the initial release dates, some artists keep on selling albums they originally released for instance in 1972. those albums sold over the years in their millions.

== Constraints ==
Although the criteria for the following list are intended to be expansive (including comparisons for total-sales for all recording artists) there are certain limitations and constraints that may limit the conclusions that can be derived from these data. There is no certainty these things are correct for not all sales are controllable.

Such constraints include:

- Bias towards acts who have had success in a specific country or region.
- Bias towards older artists. There is a broader genre spectrum of music to listen to now which limits the number of listeners.
- Bias towards modern artists. Comparatively fewer successful pre-modern artists will have sold more records, as both global spending power and population have increased. In 1950, the world's population was 2.5 billion; by 2000 it had risen to 6 billion. Also, older artists suffer from bias as their record sales are less likely to have been accurately tracked, and estimates of their early sales are likely to be more vague.
- Fan sites, press articles and record labels have been known to inflate record sales claims.
- Inflated claims for artists who performed in different acts during their careers. Sometimes all of the sales data is attributed to an individual artist. For the purposes of this list, an effort is made to separate the individual acts (e.g., the sales figures for The Beatles and Paul McCartney & Wings are mutually exclusive).

== 400 million or more records ==
Artist	Biggest selling album	Period	Genre	Claimed sales
The Beatles	Sgt. Pepper's Lonely Hearts Club Band	1960–1970	Pop / Rock	500–600 million

== 300 million to 400 million records ==
Artist	Biggest selling album	Period	Genre	Claimed sales
Elton John	Goodbye Yellow Brick Road	1964–present	Pop / Rock	300 million
Queen	Greatest Hits	1970–present	Glam rock / Hard rock	250-300 million
Led Zeppelin	Led Zeppelin IV	1968–1980	Hard rock / Heavy metal	200–300 million

== 200 million to 299 million records ==
Artist	Biggest selling album	Period	Genre	Claimed sales
Cliff Richard	Always Guaranteed	1958–present	Pop / Rock / Rock N Roll / Jazz	260 million
Pink Floyd	The Dark Side of the Moon	1964–2014	Progressive rock	250 million
Bee Gees	Saturday Night Fever	1958–2003	Pop / Disco / Soul / Rock / Soft Rock	220 million
David Bowie	Let's Dance	1964–2016	Rock	200 million
The Rolling Stones	Hot Rocks 1964–1971	1962–present	Rock / Blues rock	200 million

== 100 million to 199 million records ==
Artist	Biggest selling album	Period	Genre	Claimed sales
Coldplay	A Rush of Blood to the Head	1997–present	Alternative rock	170 million
Ed Sheeran	×	2011–present	Pop	150 million
Genesis	Invisible Touch	1967–present	Progressive rock / Pop rock	150 million
Phil Collins	No Jacket Required	1980–present	Adult contemporary	150 million
Shirley Bassey	The Shirley Bassey Singles Album	1957–present	Pop	135 million
Status Quo	12 Gold Bars	1967–present	Rock	130 million
Adele	21	2006–present	Pop / Soul	120 million
Bay City Rollers	Rollin'	1964-present	Pop rock / glam rock	120 million
Dire Straits	Brothers in Arms	1977–1995	Rock / Pop	120 million
The Dave Clark Five	–	1964–1970	Pop rock / Beat	100 million
Deep Purple	Machine Head	1968–present	Hard rock	100 million
Def Leppard	Hysteria	1977–present	Hard rock / heavy metal	100 million
Depeche Mode	Violator	1980–present	Electro Rock	100 million
Fleetwood Mac	Rumours	1967–present	Pop rock	100 million
George Michael	Faith	1981–2016	Pop	100 million
Iron Maiden	The Number of the Beast	1975–present	Heavy metal	100 million
Paul McCartney	Pipes of Peace	1957–present	Pop rock	100 million
Pet Shop Boys	Actually	1981–present	Synthpop	100 million
Rod Stewart	Out of Order	1962–present	Rock / Pop	100 million
UB40	Promises and Lies	1980–present	Reggae	100 million
The Who	Who's Next	1964–present	Rock / Hard rock	100 million

== 50 to 99 million records ==
Artist	Biggest selling album	Period	Genre	Claimed sales
Spice Girls	Spice	1996–2000; 2007–2008	Pop, Euro Pop	90 million
Eurythmics	Greatest Hits	1980–present	New wave	75 million
Robbie Williams	I've Been Expecting You	1990–present	Pop	75 million
Little Mix	Glory Days	2011–2022	Pop, R&B, dance-pop	75 million
Oasis	(What's the Story) Morning Glory?	1991–2009; 2024–present	Britpop / Rock	75 million
The Police	Synchronicity	1977–1986; 2007–2008	Pop rock / New Wave	75 million
Duran Duran	Rio	1978–present	New wave / alternative rock	70 million
One Direction	Midnight Memories	2010–2015	Pop-rock / power pop	70 million
Jethro Tull	Aqualung	1968–present	Progressive rock / hard rock	60 million
Supertramp	Breakfast in America	1969–present	Progressive rock	60 million
T. Rex	The Slider	1967–1977	Glam rock / Folk rock	58 million
Black Sabbath	Paranoid	1968–present	Heavy metal	50 million
Culture Club	Colour by Numbers	1982–present	New wave-pop	50 million

== See also ==
- List of best-selling music artists
- List of best-selling music artists in the United States
