= Vicky Smith =

British table tennis player

Vicky Smith is an English table tennis player.

Vicky was number 1 in England in the under 18 girls in 2012 and she has been part of the England National Team since she was 14.

Vicky started playing at 4 years old as her father created a small table tennis club at the local community centre. The first tournament Vicky remembers playing was the Plymouth Primary Schools event for under 11s, where she won at age 6. She had won the Home International Singles, received Gold in the School Games where she had the privilege to compete in the 2012 Olympic venue, and received Bronze in the World Schools in Italy.

Vicky was picked to play in the European Youths in Austria in 2012.

During the 2012 London Olympics, Vicky was the first torch bearer of the Olympic torch at the starting location in Land’s End on 19 May 2012.

She stopped playing in international tournaments after 2012 to focus on her education, but she has remained in the top 20 of the English women's rankings. She was selected by England Schools to compete in the 2014 Home Internationals, winning both singles and doubles titles. She has continued to represent YHL in the Premier Division of the Women's British League with Yolanda King and Rachel Trevorrow, winning the title in 2016-17.

== Education ==
Vicky completed her study of Medicine at the University of East Anglia in 2019.

== Junior results ==
Date	Event	Result
May-12	World School Games	Runner up
Apr-12	Junior Masters	5th
Apr-12	French Junior Open	Represented England in Individual & Teams
Apr-12	World School Games	1st in teams
Mar-12	Devon Senior Championships	Winner - Ladies Singles, Ladies Doubles & Mixed Doubles
Mar-12	Junior Six Nations	Winner - Teams, S/F - Ind
Mar-12	National Senior Championships	S/F - Under 21 Ladies
Feb-12	Devon Schools Championships	Winner - U/16 Girls
Feb-12	Junior British League	6th
Feb-12	Women's British League	Winners - Premier
Jan-12	Junior County Teams Championships	2nd - Div 1
Jan-12	E Midlands Junior Open	S/F - Girls Singles
Dec-11	Woolwell Open	S/F - Plate
Nov-11	National Junior Championships	S/F - Girls Singles
