= Bounce Back (Little Mix song) =

2019 single by Little Mix

Single by Little Mix
- Released: 14 June 2019
- Recorded: 2019
- Studio: Los Angeles, California
- Genre: Hip hop; trap-pop; R&B
- Length: 2:40
- Label: RCA
- Songwriters: Jocelyn Donald; Jude Demorest; Mikkel Eriksen; Steve M. Thornton II; Tor Hermansen; Beresford Romeo; Normani Kordei Hamilton
- Producers: Swiff D; Stargate

Little Mix singles chronology
"Think About Us" (2019)	"Bounce Back" (2019)	"One I've Been Missing" (2019)

Music video
- "Bounce Back" on YouTube

"Bounce Back" is a song by British girl group Little Mix. It was released on 14 June 2019, and was the group's first single to be released with RCA Records, after parting ways with Syco Music. The single was produced by Swiff D, alongside the production duo Stargate, who also co-wrote the track with Jude Demorest, Jocelyn Donald, Normani, and Beresford Romeo. The song is included on the Japanese and expanded editions of Little Mix's sixth studio album, Confetti, as a bonus track.

"Bounce Back" samples "Back to Life (However Do You Want Me)" by Soul II Soul. It was described as a hip hop and trap-pop track with elements of R&B and 1980s music, with inspiration from New Orleans bounce music. The single peaked at number ten on the UK Singles Chart, becoming Little Mix's 10th top ten hit in the country. It charted in thirteen other countries including Australia, Lithuania, and the Netherlands. It has been certified silver by the British Phonographic Industry (BPI) and certified gold in Brazil. In 2021, the group's looks from the song's music video were used for recreation as wax figures at Madame Tussauds to celebrate the group's ten-year anniversary.

== Promotion ==
Little Mix posted a 15-second snippet on their social media accounts on 26 May 2019, and performed part of the song at BBC Radio 1's Big Weekend the same day. On 28 May 2019, the group shared a number of pictures via their Spotify visuals that formed the cover of the single, which they later fully revealed, after sharing the release date of the song on an Instagram live broadcast.

== Critical reception ==
Rob Copsey of Official Charts wrote "It's a clever sample rather than a lazy re-tread, blending modern trap-pop with ‘90s hip-hop scratching and horns. while it doesn't exactly break new ground for Little Mix, there's an air of renewed confidence about the whole thing that makes it feel fresh and undeniably fun." John Philip of Billboard said, "'Bounce Back' is a high-energy, 80's reminiscent tune inspired by New Orleans bounce music. The hook features a sample from Soul II Soul's 1989 smash, 'Back to Life'. The quartet sing with soaring harmonies".

Claire Shaffer of Rolling Stone said, "The song takes inspiration from the New Orleans bounce music. 'Bounce Back', produced by Stargate, pays tribute to the song, which celebrates its 30th anniversary this summer." Madeline Roth of MTV said, "'Bounce Back' makes excellent use of Soul II Soul's classic R&B smash. Little Mix's take on it is fresh, fierce, and flirty."

=== Year-end lists ===
Bounce Back on year-end lists
Critic/Publication	List	Rank	Ref.
Insider Inc.	Best Music Videos of 2019	—N/a	

== Music video ==
The video opens with a young girl playing with her dollhouse as the group is inside it, posing in the style of the Mannequin Challenge to a musical box tone. As they all sing the intro, the camera is going into the doll house while cutting accordingly to the beat, between the group and the models. The camera then cuts to a scene where the group is portrayed on wig head stands while singing and wearing colourful wigs. The group is then seen wearing cheetah-print outfits as each sings their verse. As the bridge of the song takes place, the camera cuts to a street outside a house which is projected on with waterfalls as the group is all wearing denim while singing and dancing.

The group produced several alternate versions of the video, including a "vertical" version and an LGBTQ+ Pride version featuring drag performers dressed up as members of the group performing alongside them. The video was in partnership with Akt, a British charity organization providing “safe homes and better futures” for homeless LGBTQ youth. In 2021, the group's looks from the song's music video were used for their recreation as wax figures at Madame Tussauds to celebrate the group's ten-year anniversary.

== Live performances ==
On 15 June 2019, Little Mix performed the song on The One Show. Four days later, the group performed the song on The Late Late Show with James Corden. An acoustic version of the track was performed live at Nova's Red Room. They also performed the song on several iterations of The Voice, such as during the grand finale of the eighth season of The Voice Australia on 2 July, and on the live final of the third season of The Voice Kids UK on 27 July.

The song was performed on several music festivals like the Fusion Festival on 1 September, and the GRLS Festival on 8 March 2020.

== Track listing ==
Digital download and streaming

1. "Bounce Back" – 2:40

Digital download and streaming – M-22 remix

1. "Bounce Back" (M-22 remix) – 3:23

Digital download and streaming – Riton remix

1. "Bounce Back" (Riton remix) – 4:37

Streaming – Bounce Back – EP

1. "Bounce Back" – 2:42
2. "Bounce Back" (Riton remix) – 4:39
3. "Bounce Back" (M-22 remix) – 3:23

== Credits and personnel ==
Credits adapted from Tidal.

- Jesy Nelson – vocals
- Leigh-Anne Pinnock – vocals
- Jade Thirlwall – vocals
- Perrie Edwards – vocals
- Stargate – songwriting, production, music production
- Normani Kordei Hamilton – songwriting
- Tim Blacksmith – production, executive production
- Swiff D - production
- Danny D – executive production
- Kevin "KD" Davis – mixing, studio personnel
- Beresford Romeo - songwriting
- Jocelyn Donald - background vocals, songwriting
- Steve M. Thornton II - songwriting
- Jude Demorest - songwriting

== Charts ==
Chart (2019)	Peak position
Australia (ARIA)	86
China Airplay (Foreign Language) (Billboard China)	8
Euro Digital Songs (Billboard)	4
France Downloads (SNEP)	54
Greece (IFPI)	45
Ireland (IRMA)	20
Lithuania (AGATA)	86
Mexico Ingles Airplay (Billboard)	34
Netherlands (Dutch Top 40 Tipparade)	18
Netherlands (Single Tip)	10
New Zealand Hot Singles (RMNZ)	13
Portugal Digital Song Sales (Billboard)	7
Romania (Airplay 100)	72
Scottish Singles Sales (Official Charts)	2
UK Singles (Official Charts)	10
US Digital Songs (Billboard)	44

== Certifications ==
Region	Certification	Certified units/sales
Brazil (Pro-Música Brasil)	Gold	20,000^{‡}
United Kingdom (BPI)	Silver	200,000^{‡}
^{‡} Sales+streaming figures based on certification alone.

== Release history ==
Release dates and formats for "Bounce Back"
Region	Date	Format(s)	Version	Label	Ref.
Various	14 June 2019	Digital download; streaming	Original	RCA UK	
Various	14 June 2019	Digital download; streaming	M-22 remix	RCA UK	
Various	14 June 2019	Digital download; streaming	Riton remix	RCA UK	
Various	14 June 2019	Streaming	Remix EP	RCA UK	
Various	2 August 2019	Vinyl	Original	RCA UK	
