= Fusion Festival UK =

Annual music festival in Liverpool, England

Fusion Festival
- Genre: Pop
- Dates: 31 August & 1 September 2019
- Locations: Sefton Park, Liverpool
- Years active: 2013–2019
- Website: thefusionfestival.co.uk

Fusion Festival was an annual music festival that takes place in Sefton Park, Liverpool in the United Kingdom. The event has been running since 2013 and was previously held at Cofton Park, Birmingham. In February 2016, the organisers announced the move to Liverpool on Capital FM.

== Festival line-ups by year ==
=== Fusion Festival 2013 ===
Main Stage - Saturday	Main Stage - Sunday
Jessie J JLS; McFly; Amelia Lily; Naughty Boy; Union J Wiley; Charlie Brown; A.M.E; The Vamps; Ed Drewett	Ne-Yo; The Wanted; Labrinth; The Saturdays; Wretch 32; Conor Maynard; James Arthur; Jacob Banks; Ollie Marland; Issac Elliot; Neon Jungle

=== Fusion Festival 2014 ===
Main Stage - Saturday	Main Stage - Sunday
Pitbull; Dizzee Rascal; The Vamps; Ella Henderson; Rizzle Kicks; Wilkinson; Neon Jungle; Becky Hill; Elyar Fox; The Loveable Rogues; M.O	Jessie J The Wanted; Lawson; Union J Pixie Lott; Foxes; Fuse ODG; Luke Friend; Nina Nesbitt; Ollie Marland charlilui (Aidan Davis)

=== Fusion Festival 2015 ===
The 2015 edition of the festival expands to a 3-day festival and took place over the weekend of 28–30 August 2015. Justin Bieber was originally scheduled to headline Friday but withdrew and was replaced by Ed Sheeran.

Main Stage - Friday	Main Stage - Saturday	Main Stage - Sunday
Ed Sheeran; Tinie Tempah; Rixton; DJ Fresh; Fuse ODG; Aston Merrygold; Shift K3y; Luke Friend	Rudimental; Labrinth; Clean Bandit; Ella Henderson; Sigma; Becky Hill; Dappy; MNEK; M.O	McBusted; The Vamps; Jess Glynne; Adam Lambert; Union J Conor Maynard; Karen Harding; HomeTown; Alexa Goddard; Gorgon City

=== Fusion Festival 2016 ===
The 2016 edition took place on the weekend of 2–3 September.

SATURDAY LINE UP	SUNDAY LINE UP
Jason Derulo	Olly Murs
Tinie Tempah	Busted
Labrinth	The Vamps
Craig David's TS5	Ella Henderson
Sigala	Jamie Lawson
Fleur East	Nathan Sykes
Krept & Konan	Lawson

The line up for 2016 was announced on Monday 4 April 2016 on Capital Radio, an official partner for the festival who also announced the move of the Festival to Liverpool in February, 2016.

=== Fusion Festival 2017 ===
The line up was originally scheduled to include Ella Henderson, who was replaced with Naughty Boy due to unforeseen circumstances and Louisa Johnson, who had to pull out due to illness.

SATURDAY LINE UP	SUNDAY LINE UP
Little Mix	Take That
Tinie Tempah	The Vamps
John Newman	Anne-Marie
Naughty Boy	Ella Eyre
5 After Midnight	JP Cooper
Starley	Jax Jones
M.O	Raye
Club Drive	New Hope Club

=== Fusion Festival 2018 ===
The 2018 edition took place on the weekend of 1–2 September.

SATURDAY LINE UP	SUNDAY LINE UP
David Guetta	Shawn Mendes
Jess Glynne	Years & Years
Sigala	James Arthur
MNEK	Zara Larsson
Becky Hill	Jax Jones
Raye	Louisa Johnson
Yungen	The Vamps
	Ally Brooke
	Grace Carter

=== Fusion Festival 2019 ===
The 2019 edition took place on the weekend of 31 August & 1 September.

SATURDAY LINE UP	SUNDAY LINE UP
Rudimental	Little Mix
Dizzee Rascal	Anne-Marie
John Newman	Clean Bandit
Jonas Blue	Mabel
Sigala	Rak-Su
Nina Nesbitt	HRVY
Anton Powers	New Rules
