= Little Mix =

English girl group

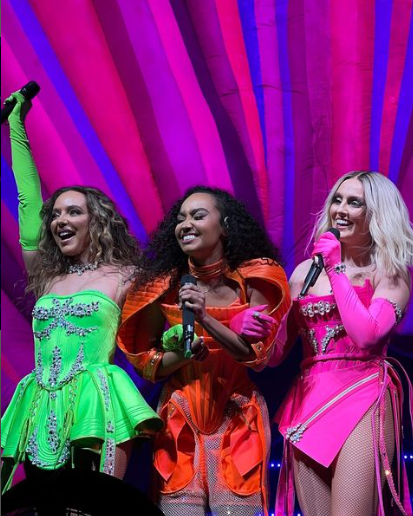
- Little Mix in April 2022; From left to right: Thirlwall, Pinnock, and Edwards

Background information
- Origin: London, England
- Genres: Pop; R&B; dance-pop
- Years active: 2011–2022 (Note: Indefinite hiatus)
- Labels: Syco; Columbia; RCA
- Members: Perrie Edwards; Leigh-Anne Pinnock; Jade Thirlwall
- Past members: Jesy Nelson
- Website: little-mix.com

Little Mix are a British girl group that formed on the eighth series of The X Factor. They are the first group and the only girl group to win the original UK series. The lineup consists of Leigh-Anne Pinnock, Jade Thirlwall, Perrie Edwards, and previously Jesy Nelson until her departure in 2020. Regarded as the show's most successful winning act, their success led to a girl band renaissance in the UK. Little Mix's vocals and harmonies have garnered critical acclaim and the group have been ranked as one of the best vocal girl groups. They were often dubbed, by some media, as the "biggest girl group in the world", before going on a hiatus in 2022, allowing its members to pursue solo projects.

Little Mix rose to prominence with their debut single "Wings" (2012), achieving five number-one singles, and nineteen top ten entries on the UK Singles Chart. They achieved further mainstream success following the release of "Black Magic", becoming the first song by a girl group since 2008 to spend multiple weeks at number one in the UK. In 2023, it became the first music video by a British girl group to surpass one billion streams on YouTube and was ranked by Billboard as one of the "Greatest Girl Group Songs of All Time". The group has broken various records during their career, including becoming the first girl group to spend over 100 weeks inside the top ten of the UK Singles Chart, the first to accumulate six top five entries on the UK Albums Chart, and for holding the record for the highest chart entry for a debut album by a UK girl group on the US Billboard 200.

The group achieved moderate success in America and retained a popular following in Europe, South America, Asia and other regions with Forbes naming them as one of the most influential acts in Europe. Little Mix also made appearances on Debrett's list of the most influential people in the UK, the Forbes "30 Under 30", and the Sunday Times "Young Rich List". Their music has amassed over 15 billion streams worldwide, making them one of the most streamed girl groups on Spotify. Since their debut, their music has been cited as gay anthems, girl power anthems, and feminist anthems, while gaining popularity in South Korea, with Pitchfork describing them as "the girl group who has captured K-pop's spirit better than any other western girl group". Little Mix have sold over 3 million concert tickets worldwide, and performed in over 20 countries across their tours, with the Confetti Tour being their most critically acclaimed.

In 2021, Little Mix became the first girl group in 41 years to win the British Group award at the Brit Awards. Their other accolades include a Madame Tussauds figure, three Brit Awards, seven MTV Europe Music Awards (the most wins for Best UK & Ireland Act), four Glamour Awards, a iHeartRadio Music Award, two Japanese Gold Disc Awards and three Guinness World Records. They have amassed a following of LGBTQ+ fans winning a British LGBT Award, an Attitude Award, and were named as Glamour's "Women of the Year and Game-changers in music". Often named as one of the best girl groups of all time, Little Mix have sold over an estimated 75 million records worldwide, making them one of the best-selling girl groups of all time, and one of Britain's biggest selling acts.

== History ==
=== 2011–2012: Formation and The X Factor ===
In 2011, Edwards, Thirlwall, Pinnock and Nelson individually auditioned successfully as soloists for the eighth series of the UK version of The X Factor in front of judges Louis Walsh, Gary Barlow, Tulisa and Kelly Rowland, but failed the first challenge of the "bootcamp" section. They were allowed another chance to compete when they were placed in two separate ensembles by the judges during the "group bootcamp" stage, with Edwards and Nelson in four-member group Faux Pas and Thirlwall and Pinnock in three-member group Orion. Both groups failed to make it through to the next stage. A later decision by the judges recalled two members from each group to form the four-piece group Rhythmix, sending them through to the "judges' houses" section. Footage released in November 2022 revealed that Rowland alone was the judge who formed the group.

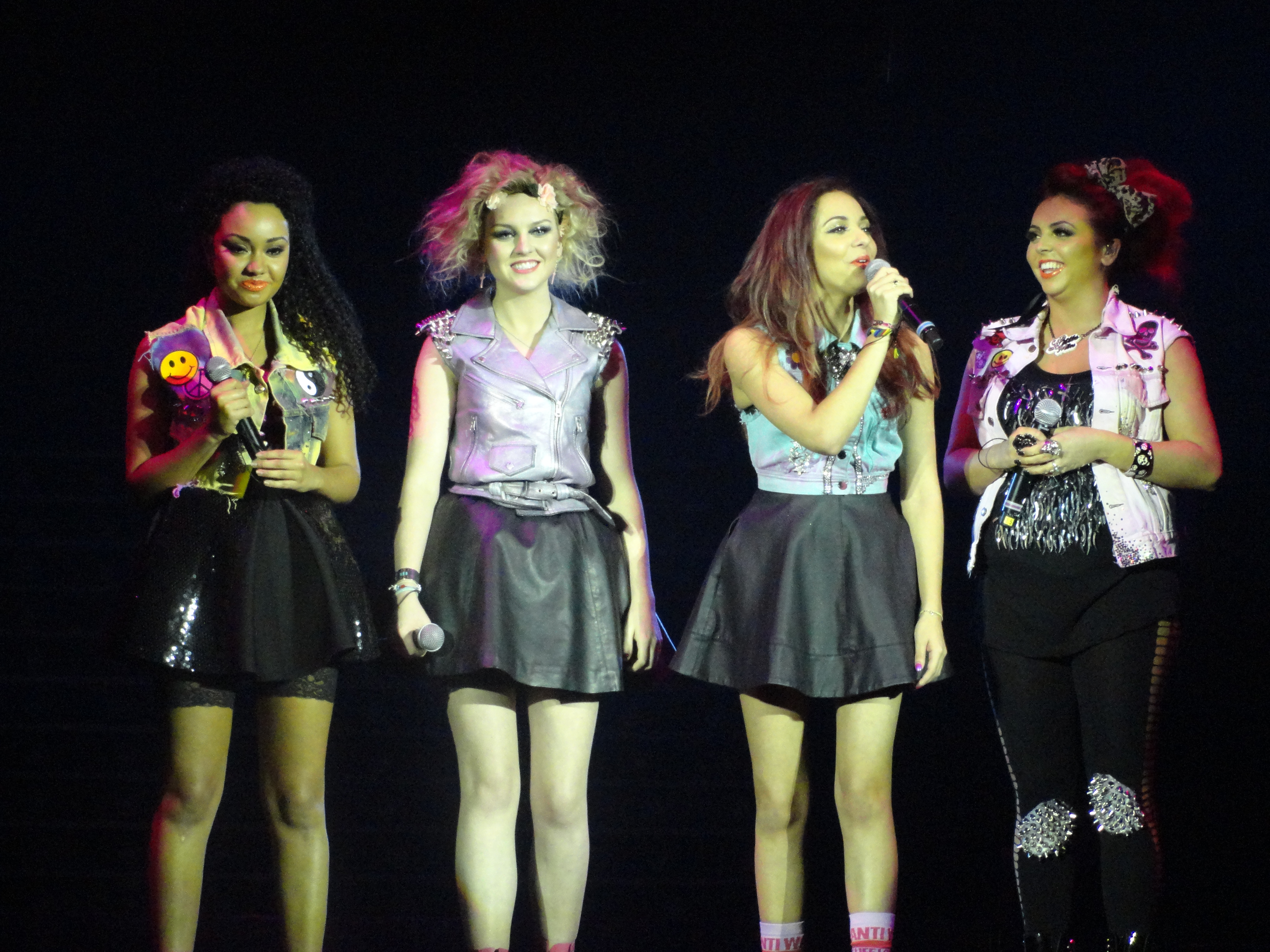
Little Mix in 2012

They reached the live shows section and were mentored by Tulisa. During the first live show on 8 October 2011, Rhythmix performed "Super Bass" by American recording artist Nicki Minaj. Their rendition was praised by the judges with Barlow calling them the "best girl band that's ever been on The X Factor." On 26 October 2011, it was announced that they would change their name following a dispute with Rhythmix, a Brighton-based children's music charity of the same name, after the programme tried to trademark "Rhythmix". A spokesman for The X Factor said, "At the request of the charity Rhythmix, the members of the girl group Rhythmix have decided to change their name, a decision which has the support of Syco and TalkbackTHAMES." It was reported that the group decided to make the change, with no legal requirement to do so, to avoid any difficulties for the charity. On 28 October 2011, it was announced that the group's new name would be "Little Mix".

On 20 November 2011, Little Mix became the first girl group in the show's eight-year history to progress past the seventh live show. The previous longest-surviving girl groups were The Conway Sisters (series 2) and Hope (series 4), who had both lasted until week 7. Through the remaining course of the competition the group generally received positive feedback. On 3 December 2011, during the semi-final stage of the show, Little Mix performed The Supremes's "You Keep Me Hangin' On" for their Motown classic as well as Beyoncé's hit "If I Were a Boy" for a song they believed could get them to the final. Their performance of "You Keep Me Hangin' On" received mostly negative feedback from the judges with Walsh stating that they "lost their mojo" and Rowland telling them she had seen them do "better vocal performances." Their second performance of the night, "If I Were a Boy", was generally acclaimed by the judges with Walsh telling them they have "amazing potential" and calling them the "next big girlband." Rowland also told them they could be "incredibly dynamic" and "change the world" when they find the strength within each other. On 4 December 2011, Little Mix made X Factor history by becoming the first girlband ever to make the final of the show. They advanced to the final alongside Marcus Collins and Amelia Lily.

On 11 December 2011, Little Mix were announced as the winners of The X Factor 2011, the first time that a group had won the UK show and the second (of five) in the worldwide franchise (after Random on the first series of the Australian version). Their winner's single was a cover of Damien Rice's song "Cannonball", which was released via digital download on 11 December 2011 and on CD on 14 December 2011. The Xtra Factor: The Winner's Story was shown on ITV2 on 17 December 2011. Their debut single topped the UK Singles Chart on 18 December 2011. They made the Christmas number-one spot on the Irish Singles Chart, beating novelty songs by The Saw Doctors and Ryan Sheridan.

The X Factor Performances And Results
Show	Song Choice				Theme	Result
Show	Perrie Edwards	Jesy Nelson	Leigh-Anne Pinnock	Jade Thirlwall	Theme	Result
Auditions	"You Oughta Know"	"Bust Your Windows"	"Only Girl (in the World)"	"I Wanna Hold Your Hand"	Free Choice	Advanced To bootcamp
Bootcamp 1	"Breakeven"	"Price Tag"	"Price Tag"	"Firework"	Bootcamp challenge	Transferred to the groups category ^{[a]}
Bootcamp 2	"Survivor" (with 'Faux Pas')		"Yeah 3x" (with 'Orion')		Bootcamp songs	Regrouped/Advanced To Judges' houses
Judges' houses	"Big Girls Don't Cry"				Free choice	Advanced to live shows
Judges' houses	"Cry Me a River"				Free choice	Advanced to live shows
Live Show 1	"Super Bass"				Britain vs America	Saved by Tulisa
Live Show 2	"I'm Like a Bird"				Love and Heartbreak	Safe (4th) – 8.7%
Live Show 3	"Tik Tok"/"Push It"				Rock	Safe (6th) – 6.0%
Live Show 4	"E.T."				Halloween	Safe (2nd) – 13.7%
Live show 5	"Don't Stop the Music"				Dancefloor fillers	Safe (4th) – 11.9%
Live Show 6	"Radio Ga Ga"/"Telephone"				Lady Gaga vs. Queen	Safe (3rd) – 15.3%
Live Show 7	"Don't Let Go (Love)"				Movies	Safe (1st) – 26.1%
Quarter-final	"Baby"/"Where Did Our Love Go"				Guilty pleasures	Safe (2nd) – 22.4%
Quarter-final	"Beautiful"				Musical heroes	Safe (2nd) – 22.4%
Semi-final	"You Keep Me Hangin' On"				Motown	Safe (1st) – 34.4%
Semi-final	"If I Were a Boy"				Song to get you to the final	Safe (1st) – 34.4%
Final	"You've Got the Love"				Free Choice	Safe (1st) – 39.0%
Final	"If I Ain't Got You"/"Empire State of Mind" (with Tulisa Contostavlos)				Mentor Duet	Safe (1st) – 39.0%
Final	"Don't Let Go (Love)"				Favourite Performance	Winner (1st) – 48.3%
Final	"Silent Night"				Christmas	Winner (1st) – 48.3%
Final	"Cannonball"				Winner's Single	Winner (1st) – 48.3%

=== 2012–2013: DNA and international breakthrough ===
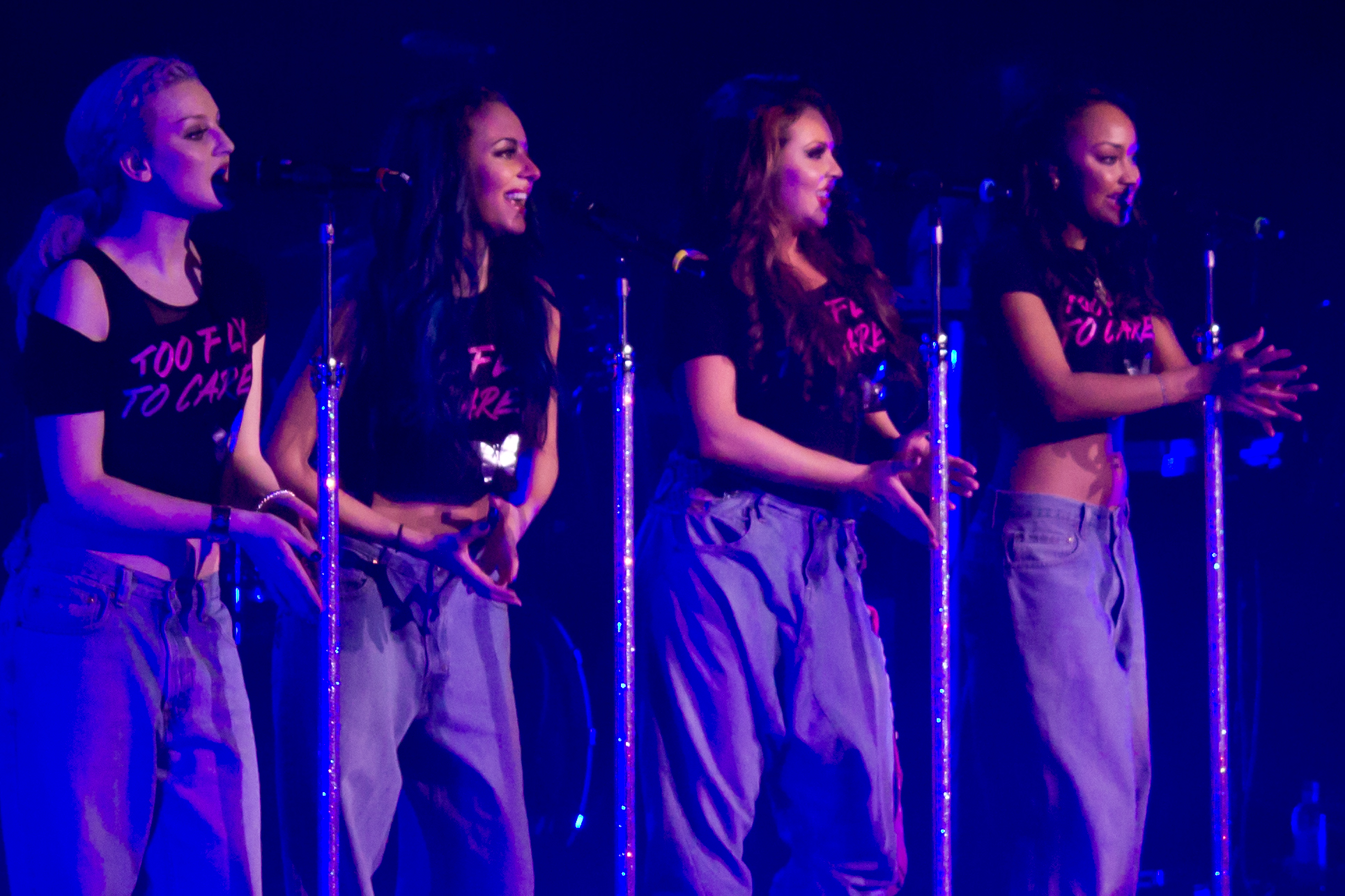
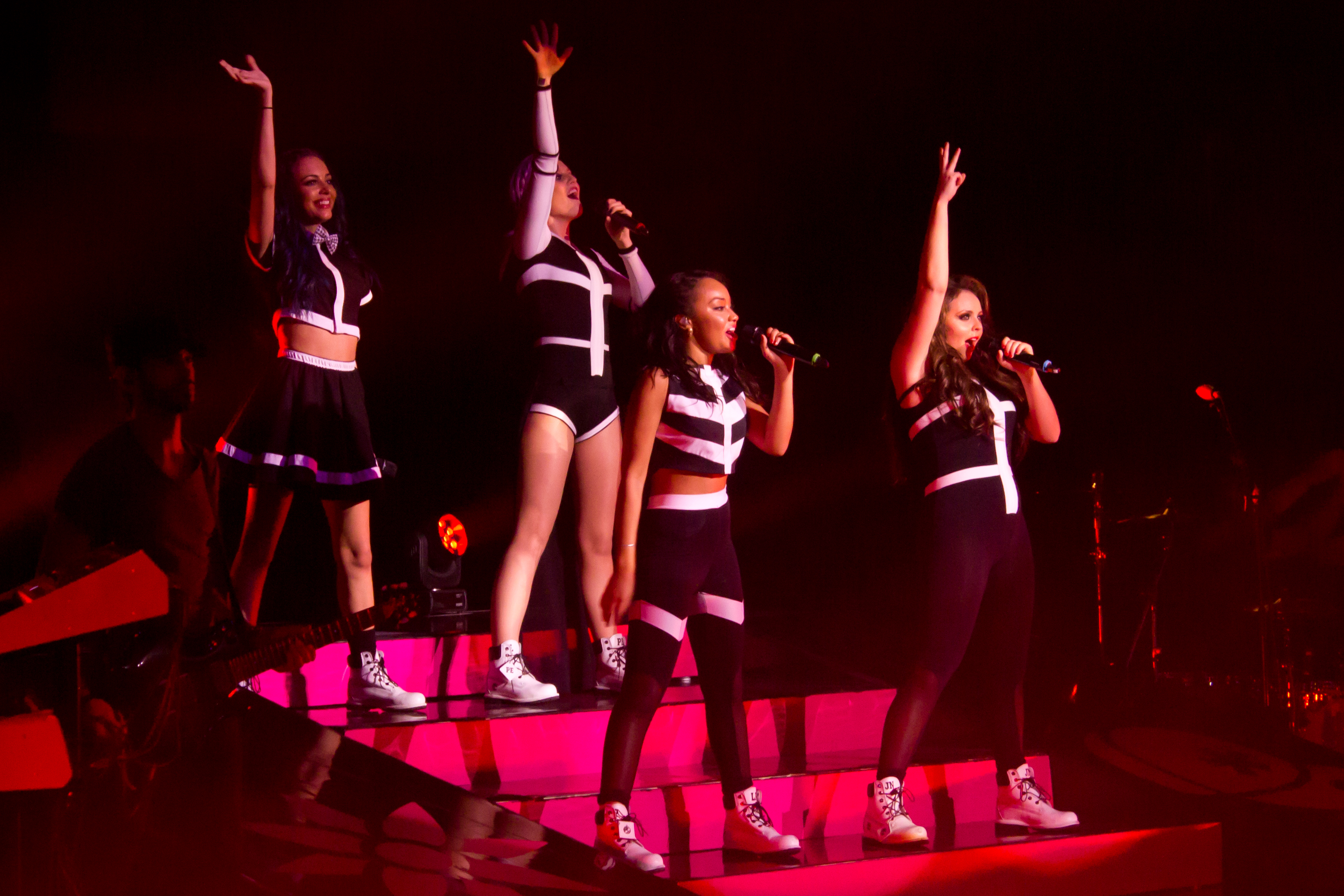
Little Mix performing on the DNA Tour (2013)

On 25 January 2012, Little Mix made an appearance at the National Television Awards and performed the En Vogue song "Don't Let Go (Love)". They also accompanied fellow judges Gary Barlow and their mentor Tulisa Contostavlos on stage to receive the Best Talent Show award that had been won by The X Factor. In May 2012, Little Mix reportedly signed a deal with Vivid and Bravado to release signature products including dolls, puzzles, accessories and games. Prior to their debut single release, the group covered an a cappella version of Beyoncé's "End of Time" and uploaded it on YouTube; the cover was publicly praised, especially for the group's impressive harmonies. Later in August, they also uploaded another cover, this time an acoustic cover of "We Are Young" by Fun ft. Janelle Monáe which again received positive feedback, generally, for the group's harmonies. On 1 June, a snippet of their debut single "Wings" previewed on chat show Alan Carr: Chatty Man before its later release date in August.

Little Mix performed their debut single "Wings" for the first time at the T4 on the Beach concert on 1 July. The single debuted at number one on the UK Singles Chart. On 31 August 2012, the group's autobiography, titled Ready to Fly, was released by HarperCollins. In October 2012, the group went on a promotional visit to Australia due to their expanding fan base there, destinations included Melbourne and Sydney. The trip lasted a week and the group visited radio stations to promote the single and debut album. They performed their single "Wings" on Australian The X Factor and on Australian breakfast-television show Sunrise. "Wings" subsequently reached number 2 on the Australian iTunes chart and number 3 on the ARIA charts. Their debut album, DNA, was released in November 2012. Nicola Roberts co-penned a track called "Going Nowhere" on the DNA album. The album reached number 3 in both Ireland and the UK. A second single, "DNA", was released in October, and in January 2013 they signed a record deal with Columbia Records in North America. "Wings" was released as their debut single in America on 5 February 2013. In the US, the single reached number 79 on the Billboard Hot 100 chart while the album reached number 4 on the Billboard 200. On 3 February 2013, they released "Change Your Life" as the album's third single, which charted at number 12 on the UK Singles Chart. On 4 March 2013, it was announced that "How Ya Doin'?" would be released as the fourth and final single from their debut album.

On 21 March, they announced that their next single, "How Ya Doin'?", would feature Grammy Award-winning musician Missy Elliott. On 4 April 2013, the group revealed that Schwarzkopf hair dye Live Colour XXL would be promoted through their music video for "How Ya Doin'?" in a new sponsorship deal. "How Ya Doin'?" debuted at number 57 on the UK Singles Chart on 20 April 2013, before ascending to number 23 the week after. In its third week, the song peaked at number 16, marking Little Mix's fifth consecutive UK top 20 hit. It charted for a further seven weeks. "How Ya Doin'?" sold 120,000 copies in the UK. The single debuted at number 55 on the Irish Singles Chart on 11 April 2013. It then climbed the chart to peak at number 26. Consequently, "How Ya Doin'?" became Little Mix's first single to miss the top 20 in Ireland, but spent a total of seven weeks on the chart. The single peaked at number 16 on the Scottish Singles Chart on 11 May 2013, marking the group's fifth consecutive top 20 hit in Scotland.

=== 2013–2014: Salute ===
In an interview with Digital Spy in March 2013, Little Mix stated that they wanted their second album to have a more R&B sound. Nelson added: "I personally want to put a lot more dancey stuff in there. As in, one of the songs that comes on in a club that makes you want to dance. Not that David Guetta sound, but more R&B – a bit like Eve and Gwen Stefani's 'Let Me Blow Ya Mind'." They also revealed that they would be starting to write material for the new album in the coming months. On 4 October, they uploaded a video to their official YouTube page, announcing that their second album would be called Salute and would be available for pre-order on 7 October. The album was released on 11 November 2013 in the United Kingdom and was released in the United States on 4 February 2014. Throughout the recording process, Little Mix worked with several producers, including TMS, Future Cut, Fred Ball, Duvall and Jimmy Jam and Terry Lewis. The album was largely co-written by Little Mix, who stated that they were more involved in the development of this album than with their debut.

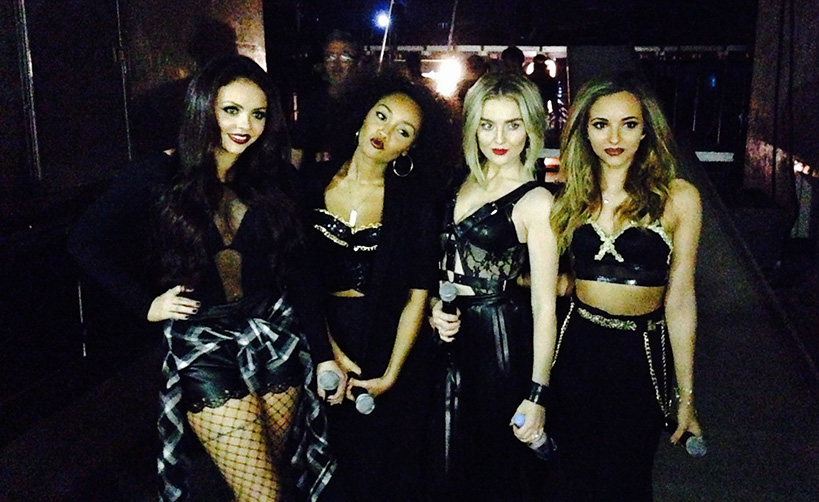
Little Mix in February 2014

On 23 September 2013, "Move" was premiered on BBC Radio 1. For the single, Little Mix worked with Nathan Duvall, an up-and-coming R&B producer and Maegan Cottone, the girl's vocal coach. "Move" was released on 7 October in Australia and New Zealand. It was later released in the UK and Ireland on 3 November. It was sent to Mainstream Radio in the US on 18 February 2014 and reached number 38 on that chart. The song peaked at number three in the UK, number five in Ireland, number 19 in Japan and number 12 in New Zealand. The single also charted in Australia, Belgium, the Netherlands and Slovakia. Since then, "Move" has been certified gold in Australia for sales of 35,000 and gold in the UK for sales of 400,000. "Little Me" was selected as the second single from the album. The song was co-written by TMS and Iain James and produced by TMS. On 21 November 2013, Little Mix revealed via a YouTube video message that they decided to release it as the second single because it held a lot meaning to them and was written with their fans in mind. The song reached number 14 in the UK, number fifteen in Iceland and number 16 in the Netherlands. It also charted in Australia, Ireland and Lebanon. The band released a cover version of Cameo's song "Word Up!" as the official single for Sport Relief 2014. The song reached number six in the UK and number thirteen in Ireland while also charting in Australia, Austria, Denmark and France.

Little Mix announced on 5 April 2014 that the title track "Salute" will be released as the album's third single. It impacted UK radio on 28 April 2014. The official music video premiered on 2 May 2014 on the group's official YouTube channel. It was released on 1 June. In December 2013, the group announced the UK and Ireland dates for their second headlining concert tour, The Salute Tour, North American dates were added in April 2014. The tour began on 16 May 2014 in Birmingham, England at the LG Arena and ended on 27 July 2014 in Scarborough, North Yorkshire at the Scarborough Open Air Theatre. Little Mix were expected to begin the North American leg of the tour in September 2014, but it was cancelled due to them wanting to work on their next album.

=== 2015–2016: Get Weird ===
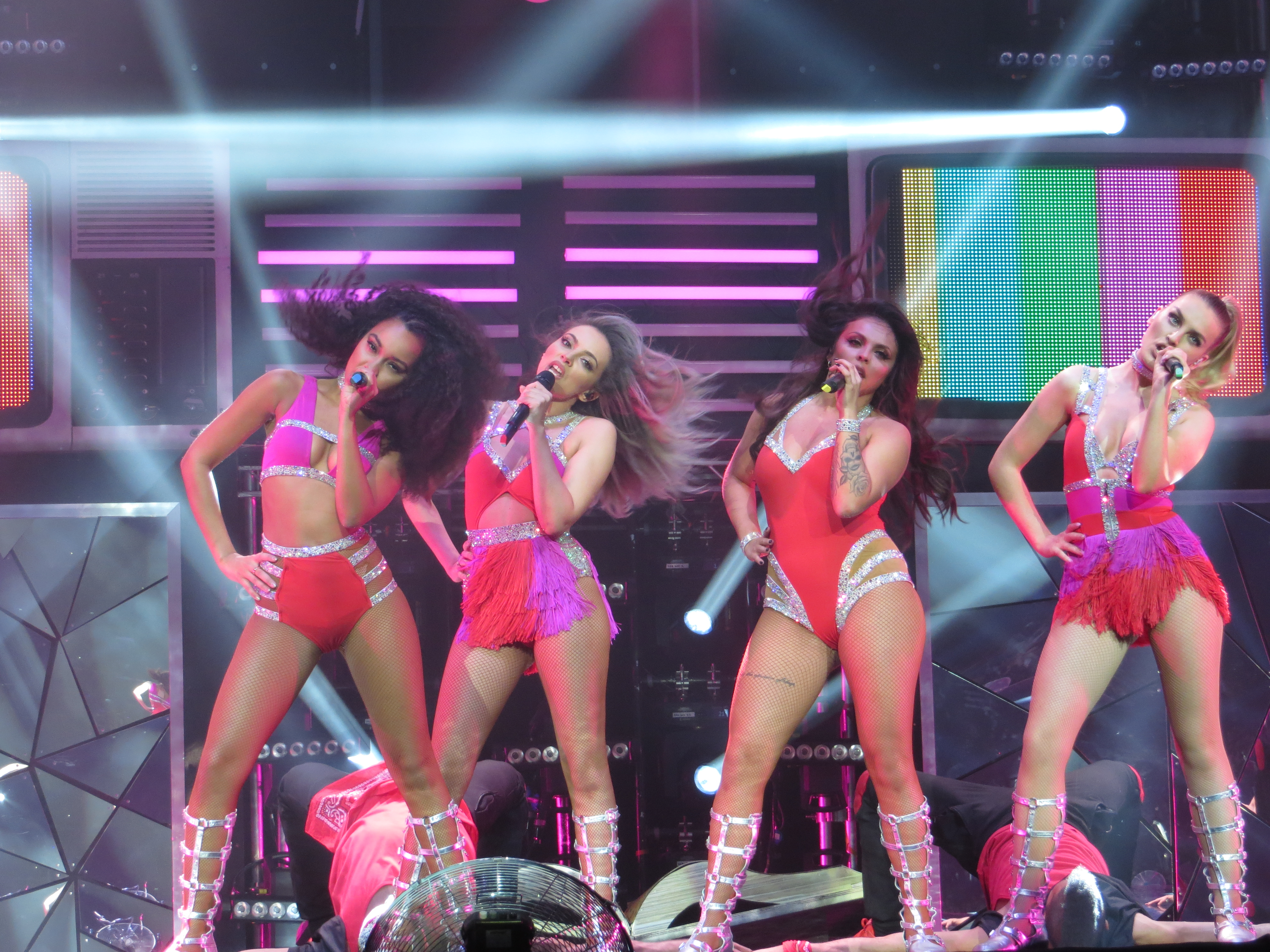
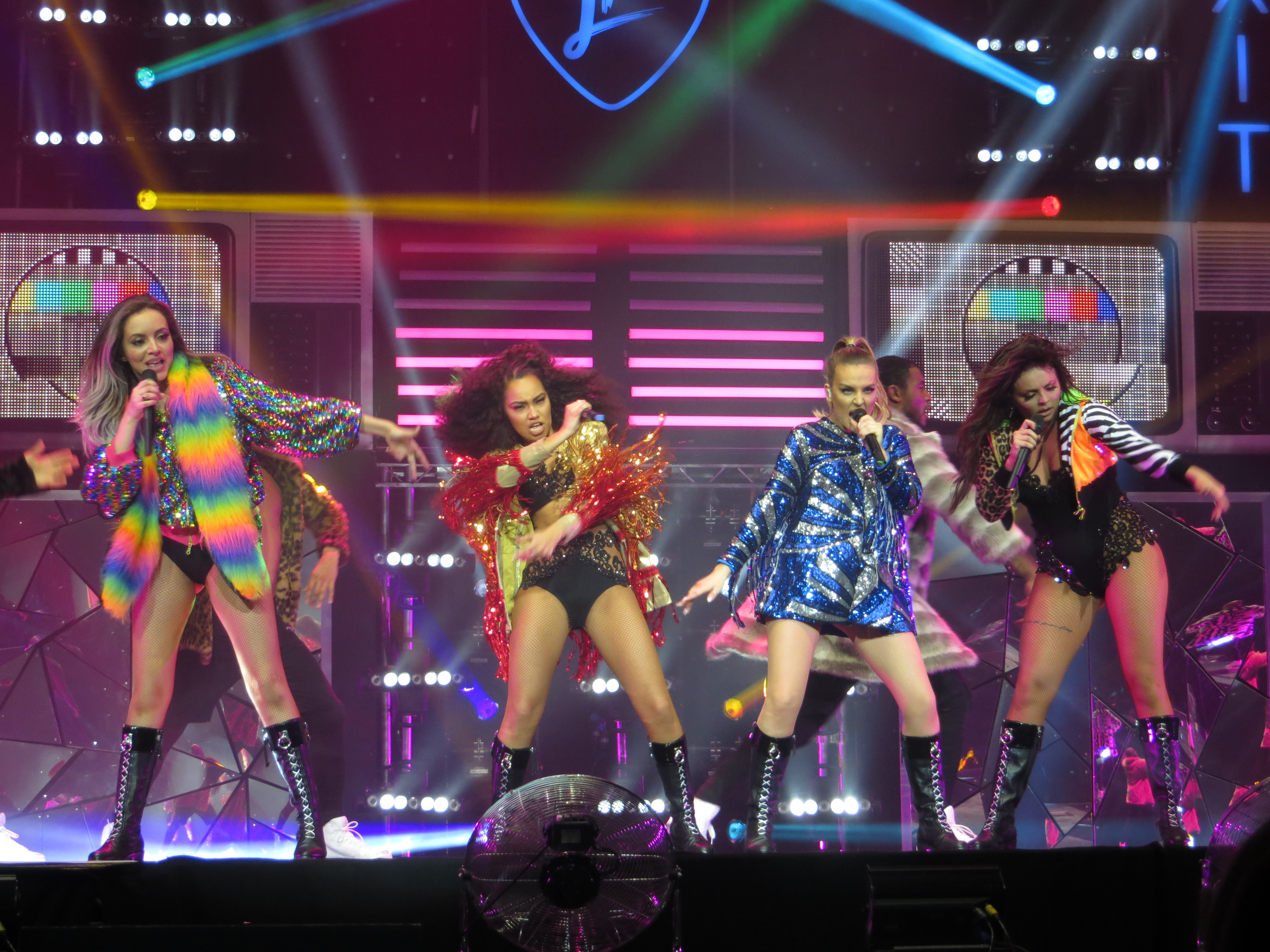
Little Mix performing on the Get Weird Tour (2016)

At the 2015 Brit Awards, the group confirmed that their album was completed, describing it as having a "whole new sound" and projecting the release for sometime in 2015. In May 2015, having written over 100 songs for their forthcoming album, Little Mix released its lead single, "Black Magic". The song debuted at number one in the UK and remained at the top of the chart for three weeks, becoming the first single by a girl group to do so since Sugababes's "About You Now" in October 2007. The single also reached number 3 in Ireland, number 4 in Belgium (Flanders), number 5 in Israel, number 8 in Australia and number 67 in the US, becoming their highest-peaking single on Billboard Hot 100. The group performed the song for the first time in June 2015 for Capital's Summertime Ball at Wembley Stadium, along with some of their previous hits. "Black Magic" was also performed at the Teen Choice Awards in August 2015, after they received the Breakout Artist award. Since then, "Black Magic" has been certified Gold in the US for sales of 500,000, Platinum in Canada for sales of 80,000 and double Platinum both in Australia and the UK for sales of 140,000 and 1,200,000, respectively. Little Mix also co-wrote Britney Spears' single "Pretty Girls", which was also released in May 2015.

On 15 July 2015, Little Mix announced on Twitter that their third studio album would be titled Get Weird and would be available for pre-order in the UK from the following day, with a global release date set for 6 November 2015. The group performed at the Gibraltar Music Festival on 5 September 2015, an annual music festival held in the British Overseas Territory of Gibraltar. On 25 September, the group released "Love Me Like You" as the second single from the album; it was released as a single only in the UK, Ireland, Australia and New Zealand. The group performed the song for the first time at X Factor Australia in October 2015, then at the Royal Albert Hall in December 2015 and at the Capital Jingle Bell Ball. The group's third studio album, Get Weird, debuted at number 2 in the UK, becoming their highest-charting album there. In the US, the album peaked at number 13 on Billboard 200, making Little Mix the only girl group from the UK to have their first three albums debut in the top fifteen of the Billboard 200. The album has been certified double platinum in the UK and has sold over 600,000 units there as of August 2016, making it their best-selling album yet. The group performed a medley of "Black Magic" and "Sax" with the former UK X Factor contestant Fleur East on the season finale of X Factor. On 5 December, the group announced on Twitter that "Secret Love Song", featuring the American R&B singer Jason Derulo, would be released as the album's third single. The single reached number six on the UK Singles Chart. On 24 February 2016, the group performed "Black Magic" at the 2016 Brit Awards, where they were nominated for British Single of the Year and British Video of the Year.

On 13 March 2016, Little Mix embarked on The Get Weird Tour to promote the album; the arena tour consisted of 60 dates across Europe, Australia and Asia. The Get Weird tour sold over 300,000 tickets in the UK. On 11 April 2016, the group announced that "Hair" would serve as the fourth single from Get Weird and would feature newly recorded guest vocals from reggae pop recording artist Sean Paul. The single was released on 15 April 2016, reaching number 11 on the UK chart and peaking at number 10 in Australia, their fourth top 10 single in the latter country.

=== 2016–2019: Glory Days and LM5 ===
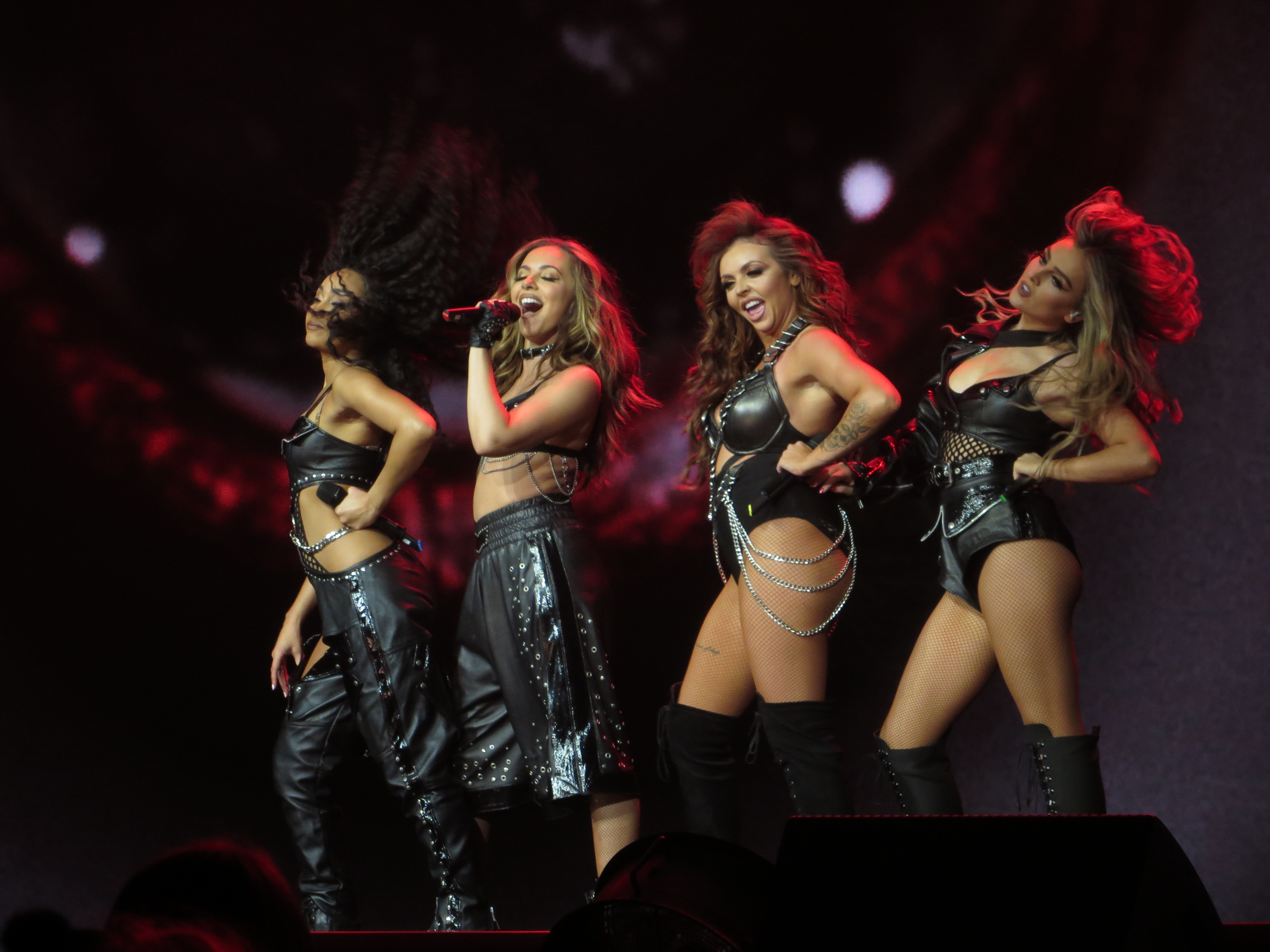
Little Mix performing on The Glory Days Tour in Glasgow

On 21 June 2016, it was revealed that the group had begun work on their fourth studio album; they later confirmed that they would be releasing new music "before Christmas". In an interview at V Festival in Chelmsford, the group announced that the lead single from their fourth studio album would be released in October 2016. On 13 October 2016, Little Mix announced the song's title as "Shout Out to My Ex" and that their fourth studio album would be called Glory Days. "Shout Out to My Ex" was released on 16 October 2016, following the first live performance of the song on The X Factor. The song debuted at number one on the UK Singles Chart becoming their fourth chart topping single there. It sold 67,000 downloads in its opening week, becoming the biggest opening week download sales for a song in 2016 in the UK.

Glory Days was released on 18 November 2016 and debuted at number one on the UK album chart, becoming the group's first UK number-one album and the eighth girl group in history to achieve a number-one album. The album sold 96,000 copies in combined sales in the first week which is the highest first week sales for a UK girl group number-one album since the Spice Girls in 1997 and the fastest-selling number-one album by any girl group in 15 years, since Destiny's Child's Survivor in 2001. Glory Days spent five weeks at number one on the UK album chart, making it the longest reigning girl group number one since the Spice Girls' debut 20 years previously, surpassing Destiny's Child's Survivor. The album reached number one in Ireland and debuted at number two in Australia, and in the top 10 in the Netherlands, New Zealand and Spain.

On 1 December 2016, Little Mix performed "Shout Out to My Ex", at the 2016 Los 40 Music Awards in Barcelona, Spain. Little Mix announced on 5 December 2016 that "Touch" would be released as the second single from Glory Days. It was released on 18 December 2016 and reached number four in the UK. At the 2017 Brit Awards the group was nominated for three awards, winning Best British Single for "Shout Out to My Ex", which they also performed on the award show. A remix of their song "No More Sad Songs", featuring Machine Gun Kelly, was released on 3 March 2017 as the third single from Glory Days and peaked at number fifteen on the UK Official Singles Chart.

From February to April 2017, Little Mix toured North America as one of the opening acts for Ariana Grande on her Dangerous Woman Tour. The group then embarked on their own headlining The Glory Days Tour which began on 24 May 2017 in Europe, with the first UK date being on 9 October in Scotland. A remix of their song "Power", featuring Stormzy, was released on 26 May 2017 as the fourth single from Glory Days and peaked at number six in the UK. In August 2017, Little Mix and Latin American boy band CNCO collaborated on a remixed version of the latter group's song "Reggaetón Lento (Bailemos)". The song was included on the reissue of Glory Days, which was released on 24 November 2017, and featured a revised track listing of four remixed songs and three new songs, as well as a bonus documentary. As of November 2017, Glory Days has sold over 1.6 million copies worldwide. The group announced on 27 November 2017 that they would be undertaking the Summer Hits Tour 2018, with tickets going on sale on 30 November.

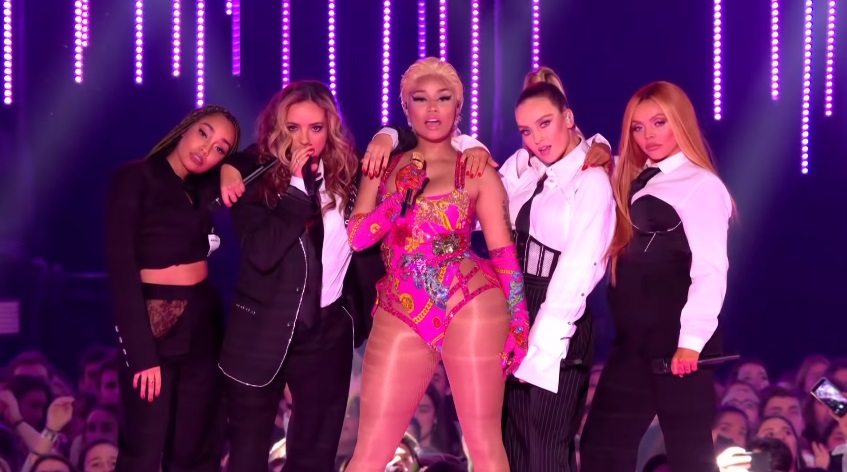
Still of the group performing "Woman Like Me" with Minaj on 2018 MTV Europe Music Awards, via YouTube

In February 2018, Pinnock announced that the group were working on their fifth album, set for release in 2018, and that there would be a tour to accompany the album. On 14 June 2018, it was revealed that a song by Little Mix and American DJ trio Cheat Codes, "Only You", would be part of the compilation album The Pool Party, to be released on 6 July 2018 by Ministry of Sound. The song was released on 22 June 2018.

In September 2018, the group announced "Woman Like Me", the lead single from their fifth studio album LM5, featuring US rapper Nicki Minaj. It was released on 12 October 2018. The music video for the song was released two weeks after, on 25 October 2018. The song debuted at number five on the UK Singles Chart, later peaking at number two. On 21 October 2018, Little Mix performed "Woman Like Me" for the first time at the BBC Radio 1 Teen Awards, where they also won "Best British Group" at the ceremony. Little Mix also performed the song on The X Factor on 27 October 2018.

After the release of "Woman Like Me", Little Mix were dragged into a feud between Cardi B and Nicki Minaj, with Cardi B claiming that the song was sent to her first, before giving the feature to Minaj. On 30 October 2018, the group went on to address the situation in a tweet saying that both rappers were approached by their label to work on the song but Minaj was approached first. They also stated "We went with Nicki because like we've said over and over for years, it's been a dream of ours to work with her since the beginning".

On 2 November 2018, the group released "Joan of Arc" as the first promotional single from LM5, and peaked at number 61 on the UK Singles Chart. A week later on 9 November 2018, "Told You So" was released as the second promotional single from the album and peaked at number 83 on the UK Singles Chart. The group then performed "Woman Like Me" alongside Nicki Minaj at the MTV European Music Awards on 4 November 2018, where they won an award for best UK & Ireland Act. It was later announced that the group would split from Cowell's record label, Syco Music, due to the label no longer working with the group's management company.

LM5 was released on 16 November 2018 and was serviced by RCA UK and Columbia Records, with future records to be released by the latter. On 13 November 2018, Little Mix teamed up with Apple Music for an exclusive live performance in London, featuring new tracks from their new album, LM5. The performances was accompanied by a live band, which marked the group's first time to perform with a live band in three years. The same day, "The Cure" was released as the third and final promotional single from the LM5 album, where it peaked at number 49 on the UK Singles Chart. Alongside the album release, the music videos for the album tracks "Strip" and "More Than Words" were also released.

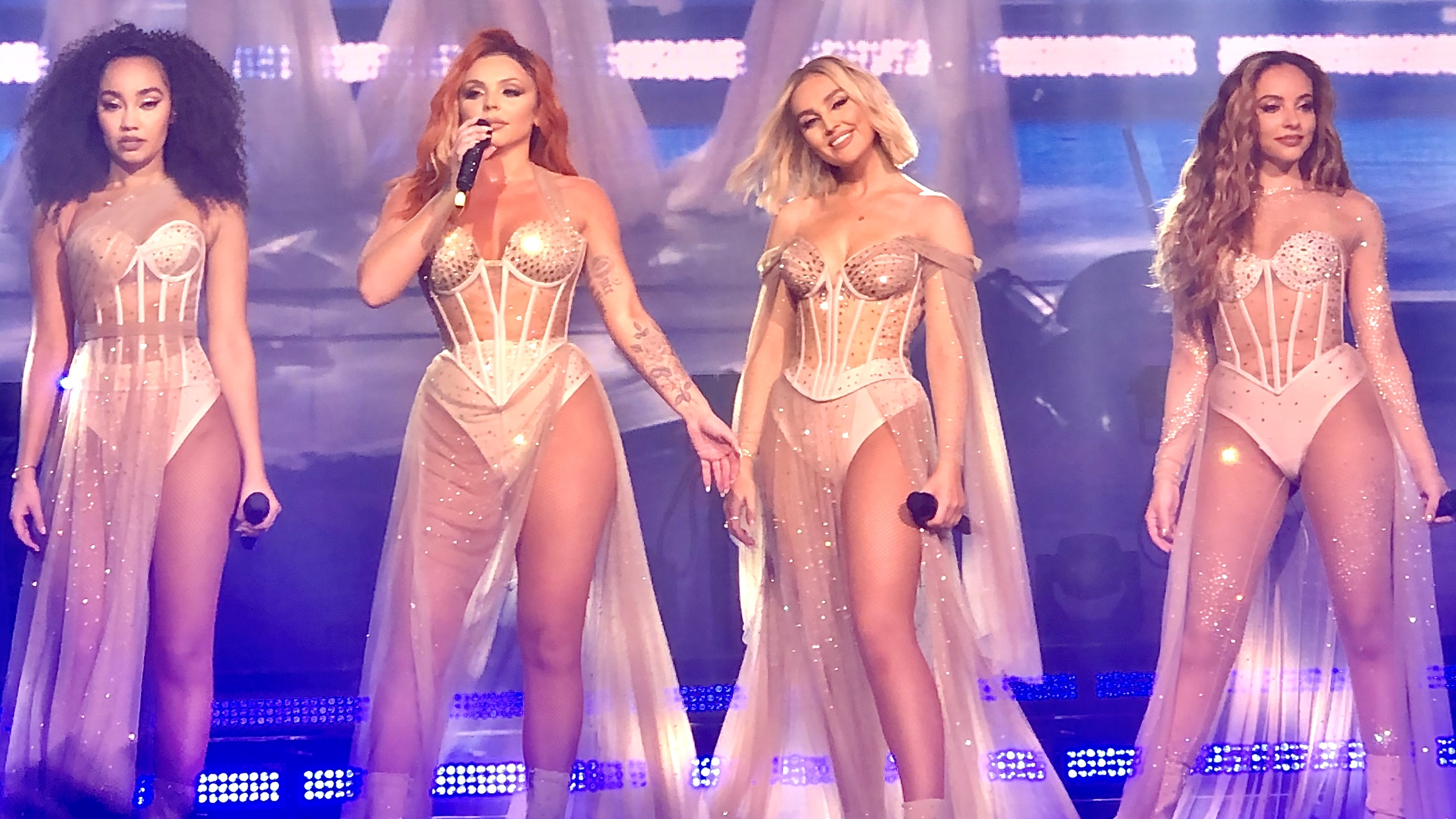
Little Mix performing in Paris during their LM5: The Tour in 2019

On 14 December 2018, Little Mix performed "Think About Us" for the first time on The Graham Norton Show. On 25 January 2019, Little Mix released a remix version of their song "Think About Us" as the second and final single from their LM5 album. The song features American singer-songwriter Ty Dollar $ign. The song peaked at number 22 on the UK Singles Chart. At the 2019 Brit Awards, the group was nominated for two awards, winning Best British Video for "Woman Like Me". During the ceremony, they performed a remix of the song with South London rapper Ms. Banks. During a live stream, Jesy Nelson mentioned that the group were at the writing stage for their sixth studio album. They announced their single "Bounce Back" on 26 May 2019. On the same day, Little Mix performed at the 2019 BBC Radio 1's Big Weekend. "Bounce Back" was released on 14 June 2019. On 1 September 2019, the group headlined the second night of the Fusion Festival in Liverpool, UK.

Little Mix's sixth concert tour, LM5: The Tour, started on 16 September 2019 in Madrid, Spain. The tour supported their fifth studio album, LM5, and consisted of 40 shows across Europe, concluding on 22 November 2019. During the last show of the tour, Stormzy and Kamille joined Little Mix to perform "Power" and "More Than Words" respectively. On 18 November 2019, Little Mix announced that they would release their first Christmas single, titled "One I've Been Missing". The song was released on 22 November 2019. The group was named as the eighth most played artist of that year in the UK.

=== 2020: Confetti, Nelson's departure and other projects ===
On 15 January 2020, Little Mix announced on social media that they would be headlining the GRLS! Festival in São Paulo, Brazil. They performed at the festival on 8 March 2020. In February 2020, the group began filming a reality television music competition show, titled Little Mix The Search, which began airing on BBC One on 26 September 2020.

In March 2020, Pollstar released a list of the 50 highest-grossing female tours of the previous two decades (2000–2019). Little Mix were placed as the second girl group on the list, only behind the Spice Girls, with $94,856,997 gross and 1,757,654 tickets sold. On 12 March 2020, Little Mix released a music video for their song, "Wasabi", which marked the end of their LM5 era.

On 27 March 2020, the group released "Break Up Song", the lead single from their then-untitled upcoming sixth studio album. This was the first release entirely under their new record label RCA. The single was accompanied by a lyric video, released on the same day. The music video for the song was released on 8 May 2020. The video was semi-animated, as they had to cancel their planned video shoot for the song due to the COVID-19 pandemic. Promotion for the single was also done remotely due to the pandemic. On 19 April 2020, Little Mix performed an acoustic version of their song "Touch" on the UK exclusive broadcast of the One World: Together at Home concert. On 24 July, the group released the second single from the album, titled "Holiday". The song was announced in a video posted to social media on 16 July 2020. A lyric video for the song was also released on the group's YouTube channel. The music video for "Holiday" was released on 28 August 2020. Little Mix embarked on their virtual concert titled Little Mix Uncancelled on 21 August, after their Summer 2020 Tour got cancelled due to the COVID-19 pandemic. On 15 September 2020, Little Mix appeared on BBC Radio 1's Live Lounge and performed an acoustic version of "Holiday". The group also covered Harry Styles' "Falling", with a mash-up of Joel Corry's "Head & Heart" towards the end. On 9 October, the promotional single "Not a Pop Song" was released. On 15 October, Little Mix announced their second promotional single "Happiness", released the next day. Their third single from the album, "Sweet Melody" was released on 23 October, as well as an accompanying music video. The track reached number one in the UK in January 2021, three months after its initial release.

Their sixth album, Confetti, was released on 6 November 2020 with the title track being released the day before on 5 November 2020. The album art, title and release date were all announced on 16 September 2020. Confetti was described by Pinnock as the group's "biggest" album yet. On 8 November 2020, the group hosted the 2020 MTV Europe Music Awards; they also performed "Sweet Melody" at the ceremony. From 21 to 22 November, a tour film of the LM5 Tour premiered in cinemas worldwide. The trailer for the film was released on YouTube on 15 October 2020. In Mexico, LM5: The Tour Film debuted in tenth place at the Mexican box office with $375.9 thousand pesos grossed.

Following an illness that prevented Nelson from appearing during the final of Little Mix The Search and co-hosting the 2020 MTV Europe Music Awards alongside Edwards, Pinnock and Thirlwall, it was announced by the group's publicist on 17 November 2020 that Nelson would take an extended hiatus from the group for medical reasons. On 23 November, Little Mix and Nathan Dawe announced their collaboration for "No Time for Tears" on their social media. It was released as a single on 25 November 2020 by RCA and Warner Music. On 14 December 2020, Nelson announced her departure from the group due to mental health struggles. Following Nelson's departure, the group announced they would continue as a trio.

=== 2021–2022: As a trio, Between Us and hiatus ===
In January 2021, Little Mix scored their fifth UK number-one single with "Sweet Melody", which reached the top of the UK Singles Chart three months after its release. On 8 February 2021, the group postponed their Confetti Tour to 2022. The tour was originally scheduled to start in April 2021 but it was postponed due to the ongoing COVID-19 pandemic and also for the safety of their crew and fans. In March 2021, Little Mix were featured on the cover of the March issue of Glamour, which marked their first magazine cover as a trio. They also won the award for "Gamechangers in Music" at the Glamour Women of The Year Awards. Later that month, the group was featured on BBC Radio 1's LOL-a-thon for Comic Relief's Red Nose Day in support of helping those who struggle due to the continuing impact of the COVID-19 pandemic in the UK. On 31 March 2021, Little Mix were announced as one of the nominees for British Group at the 2021 Brit Awards.

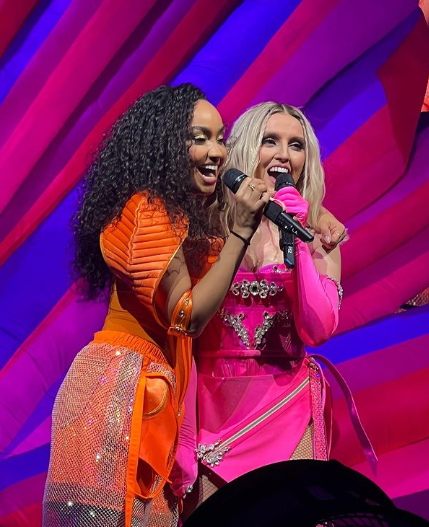
Little Mix members Leigh-Anne Pinnock (left) and Perrie Edwards (right) both announced their pregnancies in May 2021

On 21 April 2021, Little Mix announced that a remix of "Confetti", the title track of their most recent album, would serve as the album's fourth single. The remix, featuring American rapper Saweetie, was released on 30 April 2021, alongside a music video for the remix. The song debuted at number fifteen on the UK Singles Chart. On 29 April, the day before "Confetti" was released, Little Mix were featured on the cover of Euphoria Magazine. In May 2021, Little Mix were announced as the winner in the Best Group category at the 2021 Global Awards, and became the first ever girl group to win the Brit Award for British Group at the 2021 Brit Awards. The same month, Leigh-Anne Pinnock and Perrie Edwards both announced their pregnancies. On 13 May 2021, the group was featured on YouTube's Released with an exclusive acoustic live performance of their song "Confetti" following their episode. On 14 May 2021, Little Mix teased new music by posting a link to a website that displayed a 24-hour timer. On 15 May 2021, after the 24-hour timer finished, the group announced their new single "Heartbreak Anthem" with Galantis and David Guetta, which was released on 20 May 2021. A music video for the song, directed by Samuel Douek, was released on the same day. When the song spent its tenth week in the top ten in July 2021, Little Mix became the first girl group to accumulate 100 weeks spent inside the top ten of the UK Singles Chart. On 21 May, a day after the release of "Heartbreak Anthem", Little Mix were featured on the digital cover issue of Hunger magazine. In June 2021, it was revealed that Little Mix were the most-played group on UK radio in 2020 and the sixth overall.

On 16 July 2021, it was announced that Little Mix would be honoured with wax figures at Madame Tussauds in London, in celebration of the group's ten-year anniversary. Despite Jesy Nelson's departure from the group in December 2020, it was revealed she would still feature as one of the figures, as she was a significant part of the group during their ten years together, and the wax figures would depict the group in one of their most popular music videos. The figures were unveiled at the Baker Street attraction on 28 July 2021 depicts the group in the outfits used in their "Bounce Back" music video. On 23 July, the group released "Kiss My (Uh Oh)" in collaboration with Anne-Marie as the fourth single from her second studio album, Therapy. The music video for the song was directed by Hannah Lux Davis and premiered on Anne-Marie's YouTube channel the same day.

On 19 August, the group announced they would release their first greatest hits album, Between Us, in celebration of the group's ten-year anniversary. The album's lead single, "Love (Sweet Love)", was announced on 30 August 2021 and was released on 3 September. In October 2021, it was revealed that Little Mix was the ninth-most-played female artist of the 21st century in the United Kingdom so far and the only girl group in the top ten. Between Us was released in November 2021, featuring five new songs. On 11 November 2021, a day before Between Us was released, the group was featured on the covers of DIY and Attitude magazines to promote the album. In the same month, Little Mix won the MTV Europe Music Award for Best UK & Ireland Act, their fifth win in the category.

On 2 December 2021, the group announced that they would be going on hiatus following the completion of their planned Confetti Tour in 2022 to "recharge" and work on solo projects. In December 2021, Amazon named Little Mix as one of biggest artists of 2021 year on Amazon Music. In 2021, Vevo UK revealed that Little Mix was the top female act of that year and the only British act to appear on the list top ten. On 19 December 2021, the group received two nominations for the 2022 Brit Awards, for Group of the Year and International Song of the Year for "Heartbreak Anthem".

On 27 January 2022, Little Mix was nominated at the 2022 iHeartRadio Music Awards for Dance Song of The Year with "Heartbreak Anthem". On 3 February, it was announced that the group was Sony Music's tenth biggest selling global act of 2021, with their greatest hits album, Between Us, being one of their biggest selling album globally from that year.

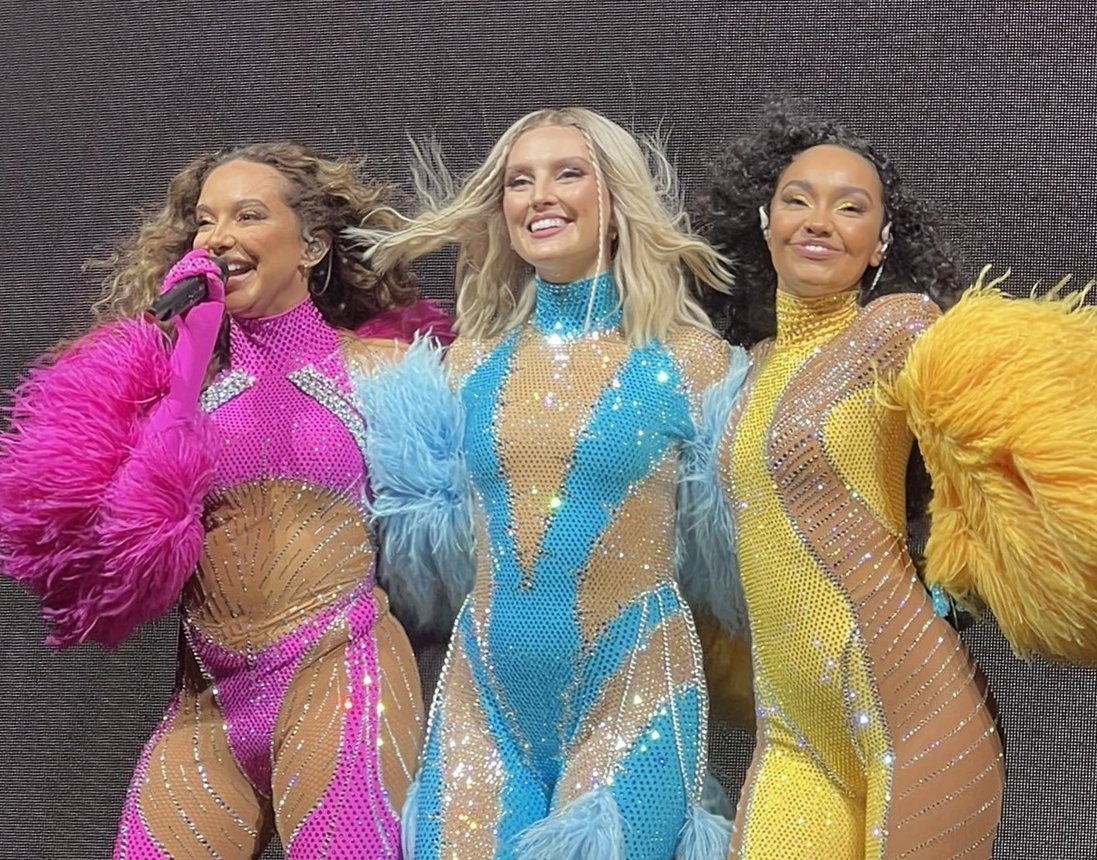
Little Mix performing at their Confetti Tour in Leeds, England

On 5 April 2022, the group was nominated for "Best Group" at the Global Awards. Between April and May 2022 the group embarked on The Confetti Tour, which started on 9 April 2022 at the SSE Arena in Belfast, and concluded on 14 May 2022 at The O_{2} Arena in London. Following the first of their two shows at Glasgow's OVO Hydro arena, they were commended and awarded a framed plaque to commemorate them becoming the band that has played the most dates, the group with the highest all-time ticket sales at the arena. After their second show, the Ovo Hydro Arena tweeted that Little Mix also now held the record for the "most tickets sold for a single all-seated show by a musical act" at the venue.

On 26 April 2022, Little Mix announced they would be live streaming their final tour date at The O_{2} Arena, in London. The stream is titled Little Mix: The Last Show (For Now...) and was available to both stream live and for a limited cinema release on 14 May 2022. Tickets were made available along with merchandise on 27 April 2022, with a portion of proceeds being donated to the charities Child Poverty Action Group and Choose Love. On 6 May 2022, Little Mix announced they plan to reunite in the future following their hiatus after The Confetti Tour. They stated they have decided to manage their own solo releases, and have no plans to release music around the same time as one another to avoid clashing on the charts. In the same month, the group appeared on The One Show, which was their last interview before their hiatus. Before the group had entered their hiatus, Edwards admitted they were already planning a timeframe for their return, with her suggesting that their break may last two years.

On 21 May 2022, Little Mix was named as the second most richest celebrities on Times' The UK Young Music Rich List (30 or Under) with a net worth of 60 million. On 20 June, it was revealed that the group was the fourth most played artist of 2021 in the UK. On 7 July, Between Us was announced by Official Charts, as the fifth biggest selling album in the UK so far of that year. On 13 July, Little Mix announced a limited vinyl edition of their sixth studio album Confetti, in partnership with UNICEF UK, for their Blue Vinyl series. On 6 August, they released their 2023 edition calendar.

== Artistry ==
Little Mix are mainly a pop, R&B, and dance-pop girl group, with influences from genres including tropical house, latin pop, and electronic music. Their lyrics are often centred around feminism, gender equality, LGBT rights, body positivity, and sexism. All three members possess a three-octave soprano vocal range.

In 2013, Perrie Edwards cited Christina Aguilera, Whitney Houston, Mariah Carey, Michael Jackson and Steve Perry from the American rock band Journey as her musical influences. Jesy Nelson cites Spice Girls, TLC and Missy Elliott as her musical influences. Leigh Anne Pinnock cited Rihanna and Mariah Carey as her biggest influences. Jade Thirlwall referenced Diana Ross as her favourite singer. Little Mix cited Beyoncé, Michael Jackson, Destiny's Child, En Vogue, Rihanna and TLC as their musical influences.

== Public image and impact ==
Since winning the British version of The X Factor in 2011, Little Mix have gone onto to become one of the show's most successful acts. During their decade together before the group announced their hiatus in 2021, they were often labelled as "the biggest girl group in the world" with The Times citing them "as the most successful girl group since the Spice Girls", and Variety describing them as the biggest girl group since the Spice Girls. The group have been named as one of the greatest girl groups of all time, with Billboard naming them as one of the most successful girl groups of the 2010s. In 2022, Us Weekly magazine named them as one of the best girl groups of all time.

Little Mix was named by Forbes as one of the most influential acts in Europe, referring to them as "this decade's answer to Spice Girls". In 2021, the group received their own wax figures at Madame Tussauds, with them commenting "From their award-winning music, to inspiring the next generation, Little Mix have been a massive part of the past decade and long may that continue!". The group influence has also expanded overseas to Asian countries with their music being covered by numerous kpop idols, groups, and trainees, with Twice citing them as one of their influences. In 2021, Pitchfork wrote that "Little Mix have captured K-pop's spirit better than any other Western girl group". The group are also known for their strong vocals and signature harmonies.

Little Mix have been hailed as "the feminist girl band of our time". The group have been noted for their involvement with the feminist, girl power, and women's rights movement, with some of their songs' including "Power", "Salute", and "Woman Like Me" being regarded as either girl power or feminist anthems. Their music has often been the subject of numerous topics including feminism, bullying, gender equality, female empowerment, body positivity, and sexism. In 2021, they were the first girl group to win Best British Group at the Brit Awards 2021, 41 years since it was first introduced and called out the music industry for its white male dominance, misogyny, sexism and lack of diversity during their acceptance speech.

Little Mix have amassed a following of LGBTQ fans and are cited as LGBTQ+ allies. Writing for Gay Times, Jack Rowe wrote "They've marched in Pride parades, had LGBTQ+ representation in their music videos, and are also vocal supporters of our community. Their concerts offers a safe space to LGBTQ+ people to be who they are without fear of judgement". At the Attitude Awards ceremony, in 2018, the group were awarded for using their platform to advocate for LGBTQ+ rights and in 2019, was a recipient of a British LGBT Award. Their 2016 single "Secret Love Song" is also regarded as a gay anthem, and is credited to helping people come to terms with their own sexuality and feelings. In 2021, Glamour honoured them as Women of the Year Gamechangers in Music.

Little Mix are listed one of the most influential people in the UK after appearing on Debrett's list of the most influential people in the UK, and the Forbes 30 Under 30 list in 2018. The group have appeared on the Sunday Times "Young Rich List" for five consecutive years from 2017 to 2022 with an estimated net worth of 60 million. They were named by DIY as one of the most defining pop groups of our generation. Little Mix have become one Britain's biggest selling acts and one of the best-selling girl groups of all time, with estimated sales of over 75 million records worldwide.

== Other ventures ==
=== Little Mix Uncancelled ===
After Little Mix's 2020 summer tour was cancelled due to the COVID-19 pandemic, on 30 July 2020, the group announced on their social media that they would be performing a virtual concert, titled Little Mix Uncancelled (stylised as 'Little Mix UNCancelled'). On 21 August 2020, the group performed the concert at Knebworth House, where they had also filmed their "Woman Like Me" music video in 2018. The concert showcased the live premiere of "Break Up Song" and "Holiday". It also has two exclusive performances for Compare The Market account holders. Little Mix Uncancelled was nominated at the 2020 MTV Europe Music Awards for Best Virtual Live, a special category created as a result of the pandemic.

=== Little Mix The Search ===
On 17 October 2019, it was announced that the group were set to launch a talent series on BBC One titled Little Mix The Search, in which they would create and mentor new bands, with the winners joining them on their Summer 2020 Tour. The series was set to premiere in April 2020, but was postponed due to the COVID-19 pandemic. It began airing on 26 September 2020, with the winner set to support the group on their Confetti Tour in 2021.

=== Products and endorsements ===
In May 2012, Little Mix launched a Union Flag-themed pack of M&M's and performed at the M&M's World store in London. That year they also released their first book, called Ready to Fly. The title is a reference to their debut single "Wings". The book was published through HarperCollins and documents the group's journey since auditioning for The X Factor. The girl group signed a joint deal with toymaker Vivid and music merchandiser Bravado to release a range of products including dolls, puzzles, accessories and games in November.

During 2012, Little Mix also unveiled a children's clothing range with clothing retailer Primark. The line was aimed at 7–13-year olds and was composed of accessories, T-shirts, leggings and nightwear. In 2013, the group promoted Schwarzkopf hair dye Live Colour XXL through their music video for "How Ya Doin'?". That year, the group also launched a range of nails and nail wraps in partnership with Elegant Touch and New Look. In early 2014, Little Mix launched their new range of nails with Elegant Touch as a result of the previous success. In September 2013, Little Mix launched their first makeup line with Collection. During May 2014, the group teamed up with Vibe Audio to bring out Little Mix zip cable headphones.

In June 2015, Little Mix launched their debut fragrance "Gold Magic". In December 2015, it was announced that Little Mix would be the new global ambassadors for the women's fitness brand USA Pro. In July 2016, Little Mix launched their second fragrance "Wishmaker". In 2017, their third fragrance, "Wishmaker Party Edition" was released. In 2018, Little Mix partnered with dry shampoo brand, Colab. Later that year, Little Mix released limited edition skin care products in partnership with Simple, a skin care brand owned by Unilever, with the group being involved in creating the packaging for the products. Little Mix's partnership with Simple continued in 2019 and 2020, continuing in partnership with anti-bullying charity Ditch the Label, and aims to tackle online bullying. The group also launched the 'Choose Kindness' campaign with the latter together with a new skin care range. Their fourth fragrance, Style, was also released. In September 2018, Little Mix released their second makeup line, LMX Beauty in Boots UK. On 7 November 2019, Little Mix released their first clothing collection with PrettyLittleThing.

=== Philanthropy ===
Little Mix took part in the recording of the 2011 X Factor charity single along with the finalists of The X Factor 2011 and previous X Factor contestants JLS and One Direction. They covered the 1978 hit single "Wishing on a Star" by Rose Royce. All proceeds from the single went to the children's charity Together for Short Lives, which provides ongoing care and support for seriously and terminally ill children, young people and their families from the moment of diagnosis. The song debuted at number one on the UK Singles Chart with first-week sales of 98,932 copies. In 2012, the group performed their single "Change Your Life" on the Children in Need 2012 broadcast appeal show, helping raise over £26,757,446 for the cause which helps disadvantaged children in the UK. Little Mix also appeared at the two-part charity concert Children in Need Rocks 2013 to raise money for the campaign, performing a medley of their singles "Change Your Life", "DNA" and "Wings". The concert was broadcast on BBC One during the Children in Need week.

In March 2014, Little Mix teamed up with BeatBullying, the largest anti-bullying organisation in Europe. The quartet is backing the anti-bullying media campaign "The Big March" and the #DeleteCyberbullying project. The campaign is urging the European Commission to introduce new laws to protect children from bullying and cyberbullying, for 77 million euros (£57m) to be set aside for services that protect them and for an annual awareness day to promote the movement. Pinnock said: "Myself and the girls have all experienced being bullied at some point in our life. When we see on Twitter that some of our fans are going through it now we find it so upsetting and that's the reason we feel so passionate about this campaign and the work that BeatBullying does." In March 2014, Little Mix released a cover of Cameo's single "Word Up!" as the official single for Sport Relief 2014. The group also visited Liberia to witness the work paid for by the Sport Relief donations. In 2019, Thirlwall and Pinnock climbed Mount Kilimanjaro for Comic Relief.

In March 2021, Little Mix participated in BBC Radio 1's LOL-a-thon for Comic Relief's Red Nose Day in support of helping those who struggle due to the continued impact of the COVID-19 pandemic in the UK. The money raised would also help tackle hunger, homelessness, domestic abuse and mental health stigma.

Little Mix have used their fame as a platform to advocate for female empowerment, body positivity and LGBTQ+ rights.

== Members ==
=== Current members ===
- Perrie Edwards (2011–present)
- Leigh-Anne Pinnock (2011–present)
- Jade Thirlwall (2011–present)

=== Former member ===
- Jesy Nelson (2011–2020)

== Discography ==
- DNA (2012)
- Salute (2013)
- Get Weird (2015)
- Glory Days (2016)
- LM5 (2018)
- Confetti (2020)

== Filmography ==
Little Mix filmography
Year	Name	Role	Notes	Ref.
2011	The X Factor	Themselves	Winner, Series 8	
2012	Styled to Rock	Celebrity mentors	Season 1; Episode 3	
2017	Glory Days: The Documentary	Themselves	Tour documentary	
2019	Celebrity Gogglebox	Themselves	One episode	
2019	Eat in with Little Mix	Themselves	Web series	
2019	Jesy Nelson: Odd One Out	Themselves	Documentary	
2020	Little Mix The Search	Judges	Music competition series	
2020	One World: Together at Home	Themselves	Television special	
2020	2020 MTV Europe Music Awards	Hosts	Also performers	
2020	How to Be Anne-Marie	Themselves	Documentary	
2020	LM5: The Tour Film	Themselves	Tour film	
2021	Leigh-Anne: Race, Pop & Power	Themselves	Documentary	

== Concert tours ==
=== Headlining ===
- DNA Tour (2013)
- The Salute Tour (2014)
- The Get Weird Tour (2016)
- The Glory Days Tour (2017–2018)
- Summer Hits Tour 2018 (2018)
- LM5: The Tour (2019)
- The Confetti Tour (2022)

=== Supporting ===
- The X Factor Live Tour (2012)
- Demi Lovato – The Neon Lights Tour (2014)
- Ariana Grande – Dangerous Woman Tour (2017)

=== Guest ===
- Taylor Swift – The 1989 World Tour (2015)

=== Cancelled ===
- Summer 2020 Tour (2020)

== Awards and achievements ==
Little Mix was the first group to win The X Factor UK, becoming the first girl group to reach the final of the series, with their win marking the first time that a girl group had made it past week seven of the live shows. As of 2022, they remain the only girl group to have won the show. They remain as the winning act with the most number-one songs from the series and the most 20 UK Top 40 singles. Their debut single "Wings", made them the only third winners from the show, to follow up their winner's single with a second number one. Their debut album DNA, reached number four on the US Billboard 200, setting a new record for the highest chart entry for a debut album by British girl group. It also had the highest chart entry there for a female group's debut album since Danity Kane in 2006.

In 2015, Black Magic reached number one on the UK Singles Chart, remaining at number one for three consecutive weeks, becoming the first single by a girl group to spend more than one week at number one since sugababes released "About You Now" in 2007. It became the first single by girl group in over a decade to achieve a platinum certification. In the same year Little Mix became the first UK girl group to have their first three studio albums debut in the top fifteen of the Billboard 200. It set a new record for the longest-charting album by a girl group on the UK Albums Chart. Shout Out to My Ex, became the group's fourth number one single in the UK, making them the act with the most number-one singles from The X Factor UK. It later became the second-best selling girl group single released in the UK, behind "Wannabe", by the Spice Girls. It holds the record for the most streamed girl group song in the country with over 196 million streams.

Little Mix's fourth album, Glory Days, made them the eighth girl group to achieve a number-one album in the UK. It also became the fastest-selling number-one album by a girl group in 15 years, since Survivor by Destiny's Child, and achieved the highest first-week UK album sales for a girl group since Spiceworld. It spent five weeks at number one, the longest run at the top for a girl group album since the Spice Girls released Spice in 1996. It holds the record for the longest charting girl group album inside the top 40 on the UK Albums Chart. In 2018, the album became Little Mix's first to reach over a billion streams on Spotify, and became the most streamed girl group album on the platform, and the first girl group album to reach 2 billion streams. "Woman Like Me" became the first song by a girl group to reach number one on the worldwide iTunes chart.

In the 2018, Little mix was the first girl group to have five top-five studio albums on the UK Albums Chart. They are also the first girl group to have three or more albums receive over a billion streams each on the Spotify. They are the girl group with the most platinum music certifications in the United Kingdom and Australia. In 2021, they became the first girl group to accumulate 100 weeks spent in the Top 10 of the UK Official Singles Chart. When "Sweet Melody" reached number one in 2021, it made Little Mix joint 11th on the list of artists with the most number-one singles on the UK Singles Chart. The group also hold the record for the most number-one singles on the Official Big Top 40, with eight in total. Their singles "Shout Out to My Ex", "Touch" and "Black Magic" are three of the most-streamed songs by female artists on the UK's Official Top 40.

The group have embarked on six tours and have sold over three million concert tickets worldwide. Their fourth concert The Glory Days Tour, became the sixth highest-grossing tour of 2017 by a female artists. During the LM5: The Tour in 2019, they received an award from the O2 Arena for their 12 headline shows at the venue. In 2022, Following the first of their two shows at Glasgow's OVO Hydro Arena, they were awarded a framed plaque to commemorate them becoming the band that has played the most dates and the group with the highest all-time ticket sales at the arena. According to Pollstar, they ranked at number 40 for tour earnings, female artists between 2000 and 2019. The group have earned a total of $94 million from all across their tours.

Little Mix have received a number of notable awards including three Brit Awards, six MTV Europe Music Awards, one iHeartRadio Music Award, six Global Music Awards, four Glamour Awards and one British LGBT Award. At the 2017 Brit Awards, they won their first ever Brit Award for Best British Single for "Shout Out to My Ex". In 2019 they won the fan-voted award for British Artist Video of the Year, making them the first girl group to win the award since the Spice Girls in 1997. At the 2021 Brit Awards, they became the first girl group to win the award for Best British Group. They are the act with the most wins for best UK & Ireland act at the MTV Europe Music Awards, winning five awards in total. In 2021 they were given the Women of the Year Gamechangers in Music award at the Glamour Awards.

The group have appeared on Debrett's 2017 list of the most influential people in the UK, the Forbes "30 Under 30" list in 2018, and the Sunday Times "Young Rich List" for four years from 2017 to 2021, with an estimated net worth of £66.7 million as of 2021. They have been described as one of the best girl groups of all time. They are one of the best-selling girl groups of all time, with sales of over 50 million records. Little Mix are one of the most streamed girl group's on Spotify and are the first girl group to have multiple albums reach over a billion combined streams on the platform. They hold the record for the most streamed girl group on Spotify. They are also the first girl group to reach hit 5, 6, and 7 billion streams on the platform. Their fourth studio album Glory Days, also holds the record for being the most streamed girl group and is the first album by a girl group to hit 2 billion streams. They once held the record for the most music videos to reach a 100 million views on YouTube before being surpassed by Korean girl group Twice, in 2021.

As of 2021, Little Mix has sold over 28 million singles in the UK and over 3.6 million albums. They have achieved 31 Top 40 singles, nineteen top ten singles, and five number-one singles. The group's singles has charted for 630 weeks on the UK Singles Chart with their albums reaching 429 weeks. Little Mix has also amassed over 12 billion streams worldwide, including over 7 billion streams on YouTube. In 2020, it was reported by the Official Charts, that the group has amassed over 1.9 billion streams in the UK. In 2026, Little Mix became the first girl group to have all members achieve a top three solo album on the UK Album Charts.

== Notes ==
Awards and achievements
Preceded by Matt Cardle	Winner of The X Factor; 2011	Succeeded by James Arthur
