= List of songs recorded by Little Mix =

List of songs recorded by British girl group Little Mix

British girl group Little Mix have recorded material for six studio albums as well as non-album singles. They came to prominence from the eighth series of The X Factor in 2011. Members Jade Thirlwall, Perrie Edwards, Leigh-Anne Pinnock, and Jesy Nelson, all aged 18–20, originally entered the show as soloists, but were placed together to make a quartet at the end of the bootcamp stage. A cover of "Cannonball" by Damien Rice was released as their debut single. After taking part on the show, the band worked on their debut album, DNA, which was released on 19 November 2012. Its track "Wings" is a bubblegum pop and R&B song with elements of 1990s music. Lyrically, it is about self-empowerment and following one's dreams. The title track has a Gothic feel to it whereby Little Mix display a darker side to their personalities. The group worked with former Girls Aloud member, Nicola Roberts, on the Latin-inspired "Going Nowhere" and featured Missy Elliott on the single release version of pop-funk track "How Ya Doin'?". The latter track contains two samples: "Help Is On the Way" composed by James Stanley Carter and "Name and Number" written by Curiosity Killed the Cat.

Little Mix's second studio album, Salute, was released on 8 November 2013. The group previously stated in March that the project would be more influenced by R&B than their previous album. "Move" was released as the lead single, and described by Digital Spy writer Lewis Corner as setting up their new urban creative direction "nicely." The title track makes use of a Blitzkrieg siren in its composition while lyrically it promotes female self-empowerment. "Nothing Feels Like You" adopts a Carnival feel while "Good Enough" is a piano ballad which deals with the process of being rejected by someone you have feelings for. The Guardian critic Harriet Gibsone described "Boy" as a revamped interpretation of N*SYNC's 2001 track "Gone". In March 2014, the group released a cover of Cameo's 1986 single "Word Up!" as the official Sport Relief charity single.

Get Weird, their third album, was released on 6 November 2015. With the exception of the "moody" trap track "Lightning", it saw the group return to a pop music style, though it was noted for its sexualised tone. The song "A.D.I.D.A.S." is an acronym for "All Day I Dream About Sex" and alludes to the sexual act of cunnilingus and fellatio in its lyrics. It also samples the line "hot love and emotion" from "Hold On, We're Going Home" performed by Drake; he, along with the song's other composers Noah "40" Shebib, Majid Al Maskati, Jordan Ullman and Anthony Jeffries, received songwriting credits as a result. "Love Me Like You" is a retro-Motown track reminiscent of Shadow Morton's work. NME writer Nick Levine noted that the lyrics "He was just a dick and I knew it" on "Hair" and "Your voice dropped and you thought you could handle me" on "Grown" were two examples of many "sassy" tracks on Get Weird.

== Songs ==
Key
‡	Indicates a single release
	Indicates songs co-written by one or more, but not all, band member(s)
	Indicates songs co-written by all band members

Name of song, songwriter(s), originating album and year of release
Song	Artist(s)	Songwriter(s)	Album	Year	Ref.
"A.D.I.D.A.S." (Note: "A.D.I.D.A.S." contains elements of "Hold On, We're Going Home" performed by Drake and written by Drake, Noah "40" Shebib, Majid Al Maskati & Jordan Ullman and Anthony Jeffries.)	Little Mix	Little Mix; Maegan Cottone; Nick Duvall; Kiris Houston; Aubrey Graham; Noah Shebib; Majid Al Maskati; Jordan Ullman; Anthony Jeffries	Get Weird	2015	
"About the Boy"	Little Mix	Little Mix; Shaznay Lewis; Ben Kohn, Tom Barnes & Pete Kelleher	Salute	2013	
"Always Be Together"	Little Mix	Ester Dean; Dapo Torimiro	DNA	2012	
"American Boy"	Little Mix	Richard Boardman; Pablo Bowman; Sarah Blanchard; Cleo Tighe; Rachel Furner	LM5	2018	
"Beep Beep"	Little Mix	Camille Purcell; Edvard Førre Erfjord; Henrik Michelsen; Iain James	Glory Days (Deluxe edition)	2016	
"The Beginning"	Little Mix	Camille Purcell	Get Weird (Deluxe edition)	2015	
"Between Us"	Little Mix	Perrie Edwards; Leigh-Anne Pinnock; Jade Thirlwall; Janée Bennett; Tre Jean-Marie; Uzoechi Emenike	Between Us	2021	
"Black Magic" ‡	Little Mix	Camille Purcell; Edvard Førre Erfjord; Henrik Michelsen; Ed Drewett	Get Weird	2015	
"Black Magic" (Acoustic)	Little Mix	Camille Purcell; Edvard Førre Erfjord; Henrik Michelsen; Ed Drewett	Get Weird (Japanese edition)	2015	
"Bounce Back" ‡ (Note: "Bounce Back" contains elements of "Back to Life" performed by Soul II Soul, written by Beresford Romeo.)	Little Mix	Beresford Romeo; Jocelyn Donald; Jude Demorest; Mikkel Eriksen; Steve M. Thornton II; Tor Hermansen	Confetti (Japanese edition)	2019	
"Boy"	Little Mix	Camille Purcell; George Tizzard & Rick Parkhouse	Salute	2013	
"Break Up Song" ‡	Little Mix	Jade Thirlwall; Perrie Edwards; Leigh-Anne Pinnock; Camille Purcell; Frank Nobel; Linus Nordstrom	Confetti	2020	
"Breathe"	Little Mix	Cass Lowe; George Astasio; Jason Pebworth; Jon Shave; Camille Purcell	Confetti	2020	
"Cannonball" ‡	Little Mix	Damien Rice	Non-album single	2011	
"Case Closed"	Little Mix	Little Mix; Robbie Lamond; Cathy Dennis; Darren Lewis; Iylola Babalola	DNA (Deluxe edition)	2012	
"Change Your Life" ‡	Little Mix	Little Mix; Richard "Biff" Stannard; Tom Powell; Ash Howes	DNA	2012	
"Clued Up"	Little Mix	Little Mix; Jessica Cornish; Ben Kohn, Tom Barnes & Pete Kelleher	Get Weird (Deluxe edition)	2015	
"Competition"	Little Mix	Little Mix; Maegan Cottone; Iain James; Ben Kohn, Tom Barnes & Pete Kelleher	Salute	2013	
"Confetti"	Little Mix	Ben Kohn; Camille Purcell; Maegan Cottone; Pete Kelleher; Tom Barnes; Uzoechi Emenike	Confetti	2020	
"Confetti" (remix) ‡	Little Mix featuring Saweetie	Ben Kohn; Camille Purcell; Maegan Cottone; Pete Kelleher; Tom Barnes; Uzoechi Emenike; Diamonté Harper	Confetti (Expanded Edition)	2021	
"The Cure"	Little Mix	Camille Purcell; Thomas Barnes; Peter Kelleher; Benjamin Kohn	LM5	2018	
"The Cure" (Stripped)	Little Mix	Camille Purcell; Thomas Barnes; Peter Kelleher; Benjamin Kohn	LM5 (Deluxe edition)	2018	
"Cut You Off"	Little Mix	Jade Thirlwall; Lauren Aquilina; Peter Rycroft	Between Us	2021	
"Dear Lover"	Little Mix	Ali Tamposi; Andrew Wotman; Chloe Angelides; Matthew Burns	Glory Days (Platinum edition)	2017	
"A Different Beat"	Little Mix	Little Mix; Ayak Thiik; Iain James; Ben Kohn; Tom Barnes; Pete Kelleher	Salute	2013	
"DNA" ‡	Little Mix	Little Mix; Gavin Jones; Ben Kohn, Tom Barnes & Pete Kelleher	DNA	2012	
"DNA" (Unplugged)	Little Mix	Little Mix; Gavin Jones; Ben Kohn, Tom Barnes & Pete Kelleher	DNA (Deluxe edition)	2012	
"Down & Dirty"	Little Mix	Little Mix; Maegan Cottone; Fridolin Walcher; Sam Romans	Glory Days	2016	
"Dreamin' Together"	Flower featuring Little Mix	Unknown	Get Weird (Japanese edition)	2015	
"The End"	Little Mix	Camille Purcell	Get Weird	2015	
"F.U."	Little Mix	Little Mix; Maegan Cottone; Alessia Iorio; Michael McHenry; Robert Gerongco; Samuel Gerongco; Jean Baptiste	Glory Days	2016	
"Forget You Not"	Little Mix	Camille Purcell; Edvard Forre Erfjord; Henrik Barman Michelsen; Anya Jones	LM5 (Deluxe edition)	2018	
"Freak"	Little Mix	Jesy Nelson; Jake Roche; Dan Bartlett; Nick Atkinson	Glory Days (Deluxe edition)	2016	
"Gloves Up"	Little Mix	Jade Thirlwall; Leigh-Anne Pinnock; Maegan Cottone; Perrie Edwards; Peter Rycroft	Confetti	2020	
"Going Nowhere"	Little Mix	Little Mix; Fred Ball; Iain James; Nicola Roberts	DNA	2012	
"Good Enough"	Little Mix	Little Mix; Camille Purcell; Ben Kohn; Tom Barnes; Pete Kelleher	Salute	2013	
"Grown"	Little Mix	Little Mix; Camille Purcell; Edvard Førre Erfjord; Henrik Michelsen; Janée "Jin Jin" Bennett; Jess Glynne	Get Weird	2015	
"Hair"	Little Mix	Camille Purcell; Iain James; Edvard Førre Erfjord; Henrik Michelsen; Anita Blay	Get Weird	2015	
"Hair" (Remix) ‡	Little Mix featuring Sean Paul	Camille Purcell; Iain James; Edvard Førre Erfjord; Henrik Michelsen; Anita Blay; Sean Paul Henriques	Get Weird (Expanded Edition) (Note: "Hair" was released as part of Get Weird, the remix was released as a post-album-release single.)	2015	
"Happiness"	Little Mix	Uzoechi Emenike; Camille Purcell; Ben Kohn; Tom Barnes; Pete Kelleher	Confetti	2020	
"Heartbreak Anthem" ‡	Little Mix, Galantis and David Guetta	Jenna Andrews; Thom Bridges; Lorenzo Cosi; Perrie Edwards; David Saint Fleur; Johnny Goldstein; David Guetta; Henrik Jonback; Christian Karlsson; Yk Koi; Sorana Pacurar; Leigh-Anne Pinnock; Christopher Tempest; Jade Thirlwall	Non-album single	2021	
"Holiday" ‡	Little Mix	Jade Thirlwall; Perrie Edwards; Leigh-Anne Pinnock; Camille Purcell; Goldfingers	Confetti	2020	
"How Ya Doin'?" (Note: "How You Doin'?" contains elements of "Help Is On the Way" composed by James Stanley Carter, and elements of "Name and Number" written by Curiosity Killed the Cat.)	Little Mix	Little Mix; Darren Lewis; Iylola Babalola; Shaznay Lewis; Curiosity Killed the Cat	DNA	2012	
"How Ya Doin'?" (Remix) ‡	Little Mix featuring Missy Elliott	Little Mix; Darren Lewis; Iylola Babalola; Shaznay Lewis; Curiosity Killed the Cat; Missy Elliott	DNA (Deluxe edition)	2013	
"I Love You"	Little Mix	Little Mix; Camille Purcell; Ben Kohn; Tom Barnes; Pete Kelleher	Get Weird	2015	
"I Won't"	Little Mix	Little Mix; Jess Glynne; Ben Kohn; Tom Barnes; Pete Kelleher	Get Weird (Deluxe edition)	2015	
"If I Get My Way"	Little Mix	Ben Kohn; Pete Kelleher; Tom Barnes; Rachel Keen; Rømans	Glory Days (Platinum edition)	2017	
"If You Want My Love"	Little Mix	Andrew Bullimore; Camille Purcell; Goldfingers	Confetti	2020	
"Is Your Love Enough?"	Little Mix	Edvard Erfjord; Eyelar Mirzazedah; Fred Gibson; Henrik Michelsen; Rømans	Glory Days (Platinum edition)	2017	
"Joan of Arc"	Little Mix	Leigh-Anne Pinnock; Jade Thirlwall; Hanni Ibrahim; Patrick Patrikios; Philip Plested; Alexandra Govere	LM5	2018	
"Kiss My (Uh-Oh)" ‡ (Note: "Kiss My (Uh-Oh)" contains elements of "Never Leave You (Uh Oooh, Uh Oooh)" performed by Lumidee.)	Anne-Marie with Little Mix	Anne-Marie Nicholson; Taylor Upsahl; Camille Purcell; Pete Nappi; Jacob Banfield	Therapy	2021	
"Lightning" (Note: "Lightning" contains a verse from "O Fortuna" from the Carmina Burana collection.)	Little Mix	Little Mix; Maegan Cottone; TroyBoi	Get Weird	2015	
"Little Me" ‡	Little Mix	Little Mix; Iain James; Ben Kohn; Tom Barnes; Pete Kelleher	Salute	2013	
"Little Me" (Unplugged)	Little Mix	Little Mix; Iain James; Ben Kohn; Tom Barnes; Pete Kelleher	Salute (Deluxe edition)	2013	
"Love a Girl Right"	Little Mix	Little Mix; Chris Loco; Robert Suarez; John Barrett; Joseph "Pal Joey" Longo III; Timothy Kelley; Robert Robinson; Mark Andrews; Markquis Collins	LM5	2018	
"Love Drunk"	Little Mix	Leigh-Anne Pinnock; Paul Meehan; Tim Woodcock; Alessandro Benassi	DNA (Deluxe edition)	2012	
"Love Me Like You" ‡	Little Mix	Steve Mac; Camille Purcell; Iain James; James Newman	Get Weird	2015	
"Love Me Like You" (Christmas Mix)	Little Mix	Steve Mac; Camille Purcell; Iain James; James Newman	Get Weird (Japanese edition)	2015	
"Love Me or Leave Me"	Little Mix	Matt Radosevich; Julia Michaels; Shane Stevens	Get Weird	2015	
"Love (Sweet Love)" ‡	Little Mix	Jade Thirlwall; Leigh-Anne Pinnock; MNEK; Sakima; Lauren Aquilina; Ross Godfrey; Paul Godfrey; Skye Edwards	Between Us	2021	
"Madhouse"	Little Mix	Little Mix; Iain James; Rufio Sandilands; Rocky Morris	DNA	2012	
"Make You Believe"	Little Mix	Iain James; Philippe-Marc Anquetill; Ben Kohn; Tom Barnes; Pete Kelleher	DNA (Deluxe edition)	2012	
"A Mess (Happy 4 U)"	Little Mix	Cass Lowe; Jade Thirlwall; Janee Bennett; Leigh-Anne Pinnock; Perrie Edwards	Confetti	2020	
"Monster in Me"	Little Mix	Camille Purcell; Chris Loco; Goldfingers; Anya Jones	LM5	2018	
"More Than Words"	Little Mix featuring Kamille	Camille Purcell; Timothy Mosley; Federico Vindver; Larrance Dopson; Anya Jones	LM5	2018	
"Motivate"	Little Mix	Little Mix; James Norton; Hanni Ibrahim; Patrick Patrikios; Jenna Andrews; Javier Gonzalez	LM5	2018	
"Move" ‡	Little Mix	Little Mix; Maegan Cottone; Nathan Duvall	Salute	2013	
"Mr Loverboy"	Little Mix	Ryan Williamson; Jordan Dollar	Salute	2013	
"My Love Won't Let You Down"	Little Mix	Goldfingers; James Abrahart; Camille Purcell	Confetti	2020	
"The National Manthem"	Little Mix	Little Mix; James Abrahart; Sarah Hudson; Michael Woods; Kevin White	LM5	2018	
"No" ‡	Little Mix	Perrie Edwards; Leigh-Anne Pinnock; Jade Thirlwall; Camille Purcell; Tre Jean-Marie; Uzoechi Emenike	Between Us	2021	
"No More Sad Songs"	Little Mix	Emily Warren; Edvard Førre Erfjord; Henrik Michelsen; Tays Phillips	Glory Days	2016	
"No More Sad Songs" (Acoustic)	Little Mix	Emily Warren; Edvard Førre Erfjord; Henrik Michelsen; Tays Phillips	Glory Days (Japanese platinum edition)	2018	
"No More Sad Songs" (Remix) ‡	Little Mix featuring Machine Gun Kelly	Emily Warren; Edvard Førre Erfjord; Henrik Michelsen; Tays Phillips; Colson Baker	Glory Days (Platinum edition)	2017	
"No Time for Tears" ‡	Nathan Dawe and Little Mix	Jade Thirlwall; Nathan Dawe; Tre Jean-Marie; Uzoechi Emenike	Non-album single	2020	
"Nobody Like You"	Little Mix	Steve Robson; Emily Warren	Glory Days	2016	
"Not a Pop Song"	Little Mix	Leigh-Anne Pinnock; Jade Thirlwall; Tayla Parx; Robin Oliver Frid; Lara Maria Andersson	Confetti	2020	
"Nothing But My Feelings"	Little Mix	Alex Niceforo; Jade Thirlwall; James Norton; Keith Sorrells; Sean Douglas; Warren Okay Felder	Confetti	2020	
"Nothing Else Matters"	Little Mix	Peter Wallevik; Daniel Davidsen; Mich Hansen; Camille Purcell; Wayne Hector	Glory Days	2016	
"Nothing Feels Like You"	Little Mix	Little Mix; Camille Purcell; Uzoechi Emenike	Salute	2013	
"Notice"	Little Mix	Leigh-Anne Pinnock; Jade Thirlwall; Mike Sabath; Alexandra Govere	LM5	2018	
"OMG"	Little Mix	Little Mix; Maegan Cottone; Nick Monson; Mike Orabiyi; Jon Mills; Kurtis McKenzie	Get Weird	2015	
"One I've Been Missing" ‡	Little Mix	Jez Ashurst; Leigh-Anne Pinnock; Rachel Furner; Sinéad Harnett; Tre Jean-Marie	Non-album single	2019	
"One I've Been Missing" (Acoustic)	Little Mix	Jez Ashurst; Leigh-Anne Pinnock; Rachel Furner; Sinéad Harnett; Tre Jean-Marie	Non-album single	2019	
"Only You" ‡	Little Mix with Cheat Codes	Trevor Dahl; Kevin Ford; Matthew Russell; Bowman; Nicholas Gale	LM5 (Deluxe edition)	2018	
"Only You" (Acoustic)	Little Mix with Cheat Codes	Trevor Dahl; Kevin Ford; Matthew Russell; Bowman; Nicholas Gale	LM5 (Japanese Edition)	2018	
"Oops"	Little Mix featuring Charlie Puth	Charlie Puth; Michael Caren; Jacob Luttrell	Glory Days	2016	
"Power"	Little Mix	Camille Purcell; James Abrahart; Dan Omelio	Glory Days	2016	
"Power" (Remix) ‡	Little Mix featuring Stormzy	Michael Omari; Camille Purcell; James Abrahart; Dan Omelio	Glory Days (Platinum edition)	2017	
"Pretend It's OK"	Little Mix	Little Mix; Brian Higgins; Luke Fitton; Miranda Cooper	DNA	2012	
"Private Show"	Little Mix	Little Mix; Fridolin Walcher; Sam Romans; Maegan Cottone	Glory Days	2016	
"Red Planet"	Little Mix featuring T Boz	Jon Levine; Autumn Rowe; Tionne "T Boz" Watkins	DNA	2012	
"Reggaetón Lento" (Remix) ‡	CNCO featuring Little Mix	Camille Purcell; Eric Perez; Jadan Andino; Jorge Class; Luis Angel O'Neill; Jean Rodriguez; Yashua Camacho	CNCO and Glory Days (Platinum edition)	2017	
"Rendezvous" (Note: "Rendezvous" contains elements of "Sway", written by Luis Traconis Molina and Norman Gimbel.)	Little Mix	Lara Maria Andersson; Luis Traconis Molina; Norman Gimbel; Pablo Beltrán Ruiz; Robin Oliver Frid; Tayla Parx	Confetti	2020	
"Salute" ‡	Little Mix	Little Mix; Maegan Cottone; Ben Kohn; Tom Barnes; Pete Kelleher	Salute	2013	
"Secret Love Song" ‡	Little Mix featuring Jason Derulo	Jez Ashurst; Emma Rohan; Rachel Furner; Jason Desrouleaux	Get Weird	2015	
"Secret Love Song Pt. II"	Little Mix	Jez Ashurst; Emma Rohan; Rachel Furner	Get Weird (Deluxe edition)	2015	
"See Me Now"	Little Mix	Fred Ball; Iain James; Nicola Roberts	Salute (Deluxe edition)	2013	
"Shout Out to My Ex" ‡	Little Mix	Little Mix; Edvard Førre Erfjord; Henrik Michelsen; Camille Purcell; Iain James; Ed Drewett	Glory Days	2016	
"Shout Out to My Ex" (Acoustic)	Little Mix	Little Mix; Edvard Førre Erfjord; Henrik Michelsen; Camille Purcell; Iain James	Glory Days (Japanese platinum edition)	2018	
"Stand Down"	Little Mix	Little Mix; Darren Lewis; Iyiola Babalola; Shaznay Lewis	Salute (Deluxe edition)	2013	
"Stereo Soldier"	Little Mix	Iain James; Ben Kohn; Tom Barnes; Pete Kelleher	DNA	2012	
"Strip"	Little Mix featuring Sharaya J	Little Mix; Camille Purcell; Christopher Crowhurst; Sharaya Howell	LM5	2018	
"Sweet Melody" ‡	Little Mix	Brian Garcia; Morten Ristorp; Robin Oliver Frid; Tayla Parx; Uzoechi Emenike	Confetti	2020	
"These Four Walls"	Little Mix	Little Mix; Richard Stannard; Ash Howes; Bradford Ellis; Shaznay Lewis	Salute	2013	
"They Just Don't Know You"	Little Mix	Little Mix; Fred Ball; Iain James; Nicola Roberts	Salute (Deluxe edition)	2013	
"Think About Us"	Little Mix	Camille Purcell; Linus Nordstrom; Frank Nobel	LM5	2018	
"Think About Us" (Remix) ‡	Little Mix featuring Ty Dolla Sign	Camille Purcell; Linus Nordstrom; Frank Nobel; Tyrone Griffin Jr. Victor Bolander	LM5 (EP) (Note: "Think About Us" was released as part of LM5, the remix was released as a post-album-release single.)	2018	
"Told You So"	Little Mix	Rachel Keen; Uzoechi Emenike; Eyelar Mirzazadeh	LM5	2018	
"Touch" ‡	Little Mix	Hanni Ibrahim; Patrick Patrikios; Alexandra Govere; Phil Plested	Glory Days	2016	
"Touch" (Acoustic)	Little Mix	Hanni Ibrahim; Patrick Patrikios; Alexandra Govere; Phil Plested; Brian Todd Collins	Glory Days (Deluxe edition)	2016	
"Touch" (Remix)	Little Mix featuring Kid Ink	Hanni Ibrahim; Patrick Patrikios; Alexandra Govere; Phil Plested; Brian Todd Collins	Glory Days (Platinum edition)	2017	
"Towers"	Little Mix	Jamie Scott; Little Nikki; Edvard Førre Erfjord; Henrik Michelsen	Salute	2013	
"Trash"	Little Mix	Camille Purcell; Tre Jean-Marie; Uzoechi Emenike; Mabel McVey	Between Us (Deluxe Edition)	2021	
"Turn Your Face"	Little Mix	Steve Mac; Priscilla Renea	DNA	2012	
"Une Autre Personne"	Tal featuring Little Mix	Tal Benizri; Ralph Beaubrum; Dalvin; Tiery-F	Salute (French edition)	2013	
"Wasabi"	Little Mix	Jade Thirlwall; Uzoechi Emenike; Mike Sabath; Alexandra Govere	LM5	2018	
"We Are Who We Are"	Little Mix	Steve Mac; Wayne Hector; Ina Wroldsen	DNA	2012	
"We Are Young" (Acoustic) (Note: Little Mix released a cover of "We Are Young" by Fun, and was featured on the deluxe edition of DNA.)	Little Mix	Jack Antonoff; Jeff Bhasker; Andrew Dost; Nate Ruess	DNA (Deluxe edition)	2012	
"Weird People"	Little Mix	Camille Purcell; Edvard Førre Erfjord; Henrik Michelsen; Ed Drewett	Get Weird	2015	
"Wings" ‡	Little Mix	Little Mix; Erika Nuri; Michelle Lewis; Mischke Rojas; Heidi Rojas; Ben Kohn; Tom Barnes; Pete Kelleher	DNA	2012	
"Wings" (Acoustic)	Little Mix	Little Mix; Erika Nuri; Michelle Lewis; Mischke Rojas; Heidi Rojas; Ben Kohn; Tom Barnes; Pete Kelleher	DNA (Japanese edition)	2012	
"Wishing on a Star"	The X Factor Finalists 2011 featuring JLS and One Direction	Billie Rae Calvin	Non-album charity single	2011	
"Woman Like Me" ‡	Little Mix featuring Nicki Minaj	Jessica Glynne; Edward Sheeran; Steve McCutcheon; Onika Maraj	LM5	2018	
"Woman's World"	Little Mix	Jade Thirlwall; Rachel Furner; Jez Ashurst	LM5 (Deluxe edition)	2018	
"Word Up!" ‡	Little Mix	Larry Blackmon; Tomi Jenkins	Non-album charity single (Note: "Word Up!" was released as a charity single from the charity event Sport Relief.)	2014	
"You Gotta Not"	Little Mix	Johan Carlsson; Alexander Kronlund; Ross Golan; Meghan Trainor	Glory Days	2016	
"Your Love"	Little Mix	Camille Purcell; Jeremy Coleman; James Abrahart	Glory Days	2016	

== See also ==
- Little Mix discography
