= Little Mix discography =

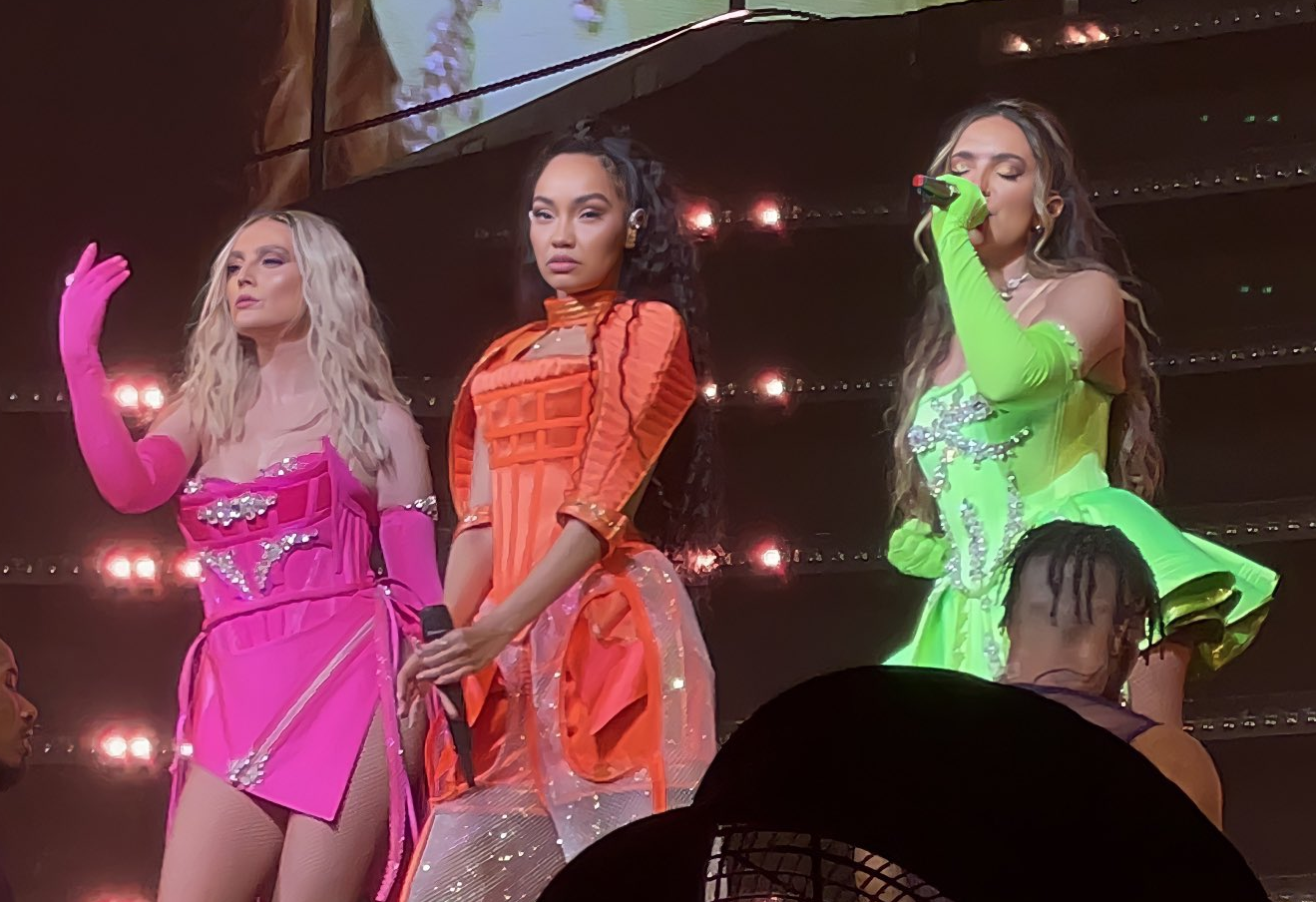
- Little Mix performing on The Confetti Tour in 2022
- Studio albums: 6
- Compilation albums: 1
- Singles: 32
- Music videos: 40
- Promotional singles: 22
- Reissues: 1

British girl group Little Mix have released six studio albums, one compilation album, 33 singles (including one charity single) and 40 music videos, 17 of which has received over 100 million views on Vevo. As of 2021, the group have amassed 44 chart entries on the UK Singles Chart, 31 Top 40 singles, nineteen top ten entries and five number ones. Their singles have charted for over 630 weeks, while their albums have charted for over 429 weeks. According to the Official Charts Company, the group have sold over 28 million singles and 3.6 million albums in the UK. They have amassed over 15 billion streams across all streaming platforms, and are one of the world's best-selling girl groups.

Little Mix X Factor winner's single, a cover of Damien Rice's "Cannonball", became the group's first number one single on the UK Singles Chart, Scottish Singles Charts and Irish Singles Chart. The lead single from their debut studio album "Wings" became the group's second number one in three countries, making them the third X Factor winners to follow up their winner's single with a second number one. It reached the top ten in Australia, Belgium, and Japan. In 2012, Little Mix released their debut album DNA, which peaked inside the top ten in ten music markets, setting a new record for the highest chart entry for a debut album by a UK girl group in the States. DNA spawned three singles; the UK top three hit and title track "DNA", the UK top twenty singles "Change Your Life" and "How Ya Doin'?". In 2013, the lead single "Move" from their second album Salute, reached the top ten in the UK, Ireland and Scotland. It produced two singles; "Little Me" and the top ten hit and title track "Salute". The group's second studio album, Salute, was released in November 2013, and became their second album to debut inside the top ten in the UK, Australia and the US. In 2014, Little Mix released a cover version of "Word Up!" as the official single for Sport Relief, which reached the top ten in the UK.

In May 2015, Little Mix released "Black Magic" as the lead single from their third album. The song debuted at number one in the UK and remained at the top of the chart for three weeks, becoming the first single by a girl group to do so since Sugababes's "About You Now" in October 2007. It reached the top ten in five countries and was named by Billboard as one of 100 Greatest Girl Group Songs of All Time. The band's third studio album Get Weird was released in November 2015 and debuted at number two in both the UK and Australia, and debuted at number one in Ireland. In the US, it peaked at number thirteen, and made Little Mix the first British girl group to have their first three studio albums reach the top fifteen of the Billboard 200. The album's second and fourth singles "Love Me Like You" and "Hair" both peaked at number eleven in the UK, while the third single "Secret Love Song" reached number six.

In 2016, Little Mix released the lead single "Shout Out to My Ex" from their fourth studio album Glory Days. It reached number one in the UK and was the only UK number one of that year to be led by a female act. On November 18, 2016, the band released their fourth album Glory Days, which debuted at number one the UK Albums Charts, becoming Little Mix's first number one album. It sold over 96,000 copies in its first week, and had the highest first-week UK album sales for a girl group since 1997, was the fastest-selling number-one album by a girl group since 2001, and became the longest charting number one album by a girl group since 1996. The album spawned four singles, "Touch", "No More Sad Songs", "Power", and Reggaetón Lento (Remix), four of which reached the top ten of the UK Singles Charts. All singles have been certified platinum or higher by the BPI.

In 2018, the group released "Only You" which peaked at number thirteen in the UK. The band's fifth album, LM5, was released the same year. It was preceded by the lead single "Woman Like Me", which peaked at number ten in eight countries including the UK. The album reached the top ten in nine countries, making Little Mix the first girl group to have five consecutive top-five studio albums in the UK. The second single "Think About Us" peaked at number twenty two in the UK. In 2019, Little Mix released two more singles "Bounce Back", debuted at number ten in the UK, while "One I've Been Missing" peaked inside the top sixty. In 2020, the lead single "Break Up Song" from their sixth album Confetti, became their fifteenth top ten hit in the UK. The second single "Holiday", reached the UK top 20, while the third single "Sweet Melody" became Little Mix's fifth and last number one as a four piece before Nelson's departure in 2020. After Nelson's departure "Confetti" served as the final single and reached number nine in the UK.

In 2021, the group released the UK top twenty single "No Time for Tears". They achieved two more top ten entries with "Heartbreak Anthem" and "Kiss My (Uh-Oh)". This made them the first girl group to spend a total of 100 weeks within the top 10 of the UK Singles Chart. The group released their first greatest hits album in November 2021, which reached the top ten in several countries. It was one of Sony Music's top ten best-selling albums globally of 2021.

== Albums ==
=== Studio albums ===
List of studio albums, with selected details, chart positions, sales, and certifications
| Title | Details | Peak chart positions | | | | | | | | | | Sales | Certifications |
| Title | Details | UK | AUS | CAN | FRA | IRE | JPN | NLD | NZ | SWE | US | Sales | Certifications |
|---|---|---|---|---|---|---|---|---|---|---|---|---|---|
| DNA | Released: 16 November 2012; Label: Syco, Columbia; Formats: CD, digital download, streaming | 3 | 10 | 4 | 27 | 3 | 20 | 49 | 14 | 8 | 4 | UK: 473,000 (Note: Sales of DNA in the United Kingdom as of May 2022.); US: 121,000 (Note: Sales of DNA in the United States as of December 2013.) | BPI: Platinum; ARIA: Gold; IRMA: Gold; RMNZ: Gold |
| Salute | Released: 8 November 2013; Label: Syco, Columbia; Formats: CD, digital download, streaming | 4 | 4 | 7 | 38 | 7 | 36 | 49 | 11 | — | 6 | UK: 429,000 (Note: Sales of Salute in the United Kingdom as of May 2022.); US: 107,000 (Note: Sales of Salute in the United States as of September 2015.) | BPI: Platinum; RMNZ: Gold |
| Get Weird | Released: 6 November 2015; Label: Syco, Columbia; Formats: CD, digital download, streaming | 2 | 2 | 12 | 47 | 1 | 35 | 9 | 8 | 13 | 13 | UK: 950,000 (Note: Sales of Get Weird in the United Kingdom as of May 2022.); US: 63,450 (Note: Sales of Get Weird in the United States as of November 2016.) | BPI: 3× Platinum; ARIA: Gold; RMNZ: 2× Platinum |
| Glory Days | Released: 18 November 2016; Label: Syco, Columbia; Formats: CD, LP, digital download, streaming | 1 | 2 | 21 | 50 | 1 | 41 | 9 | 9 | 23 | 25 | UK: 1,200,000 (Note: Sales of Glory Days in the United Kingdom as of October 2021.) | BPI: 4× Platinum; ARIA: Gold; IRMA: 2× Platinum; MC: Gold; RMNZ: Platinum |
| LM5 | Released: 16 November 2018; Label: Syco, Columbia; Formats: CD, LP, digital download, streaming | 3 | 8 | 24 | 55 | 2 | 60 | 9 | 6 | 28 | 40 | UK: 331,000 (Note: Sales of LM5 in the United Kingdom as of May 2022.) | BPI: Platinum; RMNZ: Gold |
| Confetti | Released: 6 November 2020; Label: RCA, Columbia; Formats: CD, LP, cassette, digital download, streaming | 2 | 7 | 37 | 52 | 1 | 104 | 10 | 7 | 46 | 85 | UK: 245,000 (Note: Sales of Confetti in the United Kingdom as of May 2022.) | BPI: Platinum |
"—" denotes a recording that did not chart or was not released in that territory.

=== Reissues ===
List of re-issued albums, with selected details and chart positions
| Title | Details | Peak chart positions | | |
| Title | Details | ITA | NLD | NZ |
|---|---|---|---|---|
| Glory Days: The Platinum Edition | Released: 24 November 2017; Label: Syco, Columbia; Formats: CD, digital download, streaming | 56 | 16 | 22 |

=== Compilation albums ===
List of compilation albums, with selected details
| Title | Details | Peak chart positions | | | | | | | | | Certifications |
| Title | Details | UK | AUS | CAN | IRE | FRA | JPN | NLD | NZ | US | Certifications |
|---|---|---|---|---|---|---|---|---|---|---|---|
| Between Us | Released: 12 November 2021; Label: RCA, Columbia; Formats: CD, LP, cassette, box set, digital download, streaming | 3 | 8 | 53 | 2 | 47 | 65 | 9 | 16 | 182 | BPI: 2× Platinum; ARIA: Platinum; RMNZ: Platinum |

== Extended plays ==
| Title | Details | Notes |
|---|---|---|
| Spotify Singles | Released: 1 March 2017; Label: Syco; Format: Streaming | A two-track live EP recorded exclusively for Spotify. It consists of live performances of "Touch" and "Shout Out to My Ex". |

== Singles ==
=== As lead artist ===
List of singles as lead artist, with selected chart positions and certifications, showing year released and album name
| Title | Year | Peak chart positions | | | | | | | | | | Certifications | Album |
| Title | Year | UK | AUS | CAN | FRA | IRE | JPN | NLD | NZ | SWE | US | Certifications | Album |
|---|---|---|---|---|---|---|---|---|---|---|---|---|---|
| "Cannonball" (Note: "Cannonball" was originally released as a standalone single, but was later included on the expanded edition of DNA.) | 2011 | 1 | — | — | — | 1 | — | — | — | — | — | BPI: Platinum | DNA (Expanded Edition) |
| "Wings" | 2012 | 1 | 3 | 69 | 165 | 1 | 7 | — | 15 | — | 79 | BPI: 2× Platinum; ARIA: 3× Platinum; MC: Gold; RIAA: Gold; RMNZ: Platinum | DNA |
| "DNA" | 2012 | 3 | 48 | — | 177 | 8 | — | — | — | — | — (Note: "DNA" did not enter the Billboard Hot 100, but peaked at No. 14 on the Bubbling Under Hot 100 Singles chart.) | BPI: Gold; ARIA: Gold | DNA |
| "Change Your Life" | 2013 | 12 | 8 | — | 133 | 12 | — | — | 29 | — | — | BPI: Silver; ARIA: 2× Platinum; RMNZ: Gold | DNA |
| "How Ya Doin'?" (featuring Missy Elliott) | 2013 | 16 | 29 | — | 66 | 26 | — | 91 | — | — | — | BPI: Silver; ARIA: Gold | DNA |
| "Move" | 2013 | 3 | 26 | — | 109 | 5 | 19 | 76 | 12 | — | — (Note: "Move" did not enter the Billboard Hot 100, but peaked at No. 22 on the Bubbling Under Hot 100 Singles chart.) | BPI: Platinum; ARIA: Gold; RMNZ: Gold | Salute |
| "Little Me" | 2013 | 14 | 85 | — | — | 26 | — | — | — | — | — | BPI: Silver | Salute |
| "Word Up!" (Note: Word Up! was originally released as a standalone single, but was later included on the expanded edition of Salute.) | 2014 | 6 | 45 | — | 107 | 13 | 71 | — | — | — | — | | Salute (Expanded Edition) |
| "Salute" | 2014 | 6 | — | — | — | 12 | — | — | — | — | — | BPI: Platinum | Salute |
| "Black Magic" | 2015 | 1 | 8 | 53 | 155 | 3 | 47 | 82 | 31 | 58 | 67 | BPI: 4× Platinum; ARIA: 2× Platinum; GLF: Gold; IRMA: Platinum; MC: Platinum; RIAA: Gold; RMNZ: 3× Platinum | Get Weird |
| "Love Me Like You" | 2015 | 11 | 27 | — | 140 | 8 | 80 | — | — (Note: "Love Me Like You" did not enter the NZ Top 40 Singles Chart, but peaked at number 1 on the NZ Heatseekers chart.) | — | — | BPI: Platinum; IRMA: Platinum; RMNZ: Platinum | Get Weird |
| "Secret Love Song" (featuring Jason Derulo) | 2016 | 6 | 16 | — | — | 11 | — | — | 18 | — | — | BPI: 3× Platinum; ARIA: 2× Platinum; IRMA: Platinum; RMNZ: 3× Platinum | Get Weird |
| "Hair" (featuring Sean Paul) | 2016 | 11 | 10 | — | — | 20 | — | — | 32 | — | — | BPI: Platinum; ARIA: 2× Platinum; IRMA: Platinum; NVPI: Gold; RMNZ: Platinum | Get Weird |
| "Shout Out to My Ex" | 2016 | 1 | 4 | 37 | 106 | 1 | 42 | 26 | 7 | 38 | 69 | BPI: 4× Platinum; ARIA: 3× Platinum; IRMA: Platinum; MC: Platinum; RMNZ: 3× Platinum | Glory Days |
| "Touch" | 2016 | 4 | 13 | 57 | 196 | 5 | — | 69 | 22 | — | — | BPI: 3× Platinum; ARIA: 2× Platinum; MC: Platinum; NVPI: Gold; RMNZ: 2× Platinum | Glory Days |
| "No More Sad Songs" (featuring Machine Gun Kelly) | 2017 | 15 | — | — | — | 25 | — | — (Note: "No More Sad Songs" did not enter the Single Top 100, but peaked at No. 19 on the Dutch Single Tip chart.) | — (Note: "No More Sad Songs" did not enter the NZ Top 40 Singles Chart, but peaked at number nine on the NZ Heatseekers Singles Chart.) | — | — | BPI: Platinum; RMNZ: Platinum | Glory Days |
| "Power" (featuring Stormzy) | 2017 | 6 | — | — | 182 | 17 | — | — | — (Note: "Power" did not enter the NZ Top 40 Singles Chart, but peaked at number seven on the NZ Heatseekers Singles Chart.) | — | — | BPI: 3× Platinum; RMNZ: 2× Platinum | Glory Days |
| "Reggaetón Lento (Remix)" (with CNCO) | 2017 | 5 | 68 | 96 | 62 | 14 | 55 | 9 | — (Note: "Reggaetón Lento (Remix)" did not enter the NZ Top 40 Singles Chart, but peaked at number four on the NZ Heatseeker Singles Chart.) | — (Note: "Reggaetón Lento (Remix)" did not enter the Sverigetopplistan Top 100 Singles chart, but peaked at number 1 on the Sverigetopplistan Heatseeker chart.) | — (Note: "Reggaetón Lento" did not enter the Billboard Hot 100, but peaked at No. 3 on the Bubbling Under Hot 100 Singles chart.) | BPI: 2× Platinum; ARIA: Gold; NVPI: 2× Platinum; GLF: Gold; RMNZ: Gold | CNCO |
| "Only You" (with Cheat Codes) | 2018 | 13 | 92 | — | 127 | 13 | — | — (Note: "Only You" did not enter the Single Top 100, but peaked at No. 27 on the Dutch Single Tip chart.) | — (Note: "Only You" did not enter the NZ Top 40 Singles Chart, but peaked at number seven on the NZ Heatseeker Singles Chart.) | 89 | — (Note: "Only You" did not enter the Billboard Hot 100, but peaked at No. 15 on the Hot Dance/Electronic Songs chart.) | BPI: Platinum; RMNZ: Gold | LM5 (Deluxe) |
| "Woman Like Me" (featuring Nicki Minaj) | 2018 | 2 | 23 | 60 | — | 3 | 87 | 27 | 23 | 65 | — (Note: "Woman Like Me" did not enter the Billboard Hot 100, but peaked at number four on the Bubbling Under Hot 100 Singles chart.) | BPI: 2× Platinum; ARIA: Platinum; MC: Gold; RMNZ: Platinum | LM5 |
| "Think About Us" (featuring Ty Dolla Sign) | 2019 | 22 | — | — | — | 36 | — | — | — (Note: "Think About Us" did not enter the NZ Top 40 Singles Chart, but peaked at number 26 on the NZ Hot Singles Chart.) | — | — | BPI: Gold | LM5 |
| "Bounce Back" (Note: "Bounce Back" was originally released as a standalone single, but was later included on the Japanese CD deluxe edition and digital expanded edition of Confetti.) | 2019 | 10 | 86 | — | — (Note: "Bounce Back" did not enter the SNEP Top Singles (téléchargement + streaming) chart, but peaked at number 54 on the SNEP Top Singles Téléchargement Chart.) | 20 | — | — (Note: "Bounce Back" did not enter the Single Top 100, but peaked at number 10 on the Dutch Single Tip chart.) | — (Note: "Bounce Back" did not enter the NZ Top 40 Singles Chart, but peaked at number 13 on the NZ Hot Singles Chart.) | — | — (Note: "Bounce Back" did not enter the Billboard Hot 100, but peaked at No. 44 on the Digital Songs Sales chart.) | BPI: Silver | Confetti (Expanded Edition) |
| "One I've Been Missing" (Note: "One I've Been Missing" was originally released as a standalone single, but was later included on the digital expanded edition of Confetti.) | 2019 | 59 | — | — | — | 72 | — | — | — (Note: "One I've Been Missing" did not enter the NZ Top 40 Singles Chart, but peaked at number 26 on the NZ Hot Singles Chart.) | — (Note: "One I've Been Missing" did not enter the Swedish Singellista Chart, but peaked at number 14 on the Swedish Heatseeker Chart.) | — | | Confetti (Expanded Edition) |
| "Break Up Song" | 2020 | 9 | — | — (Note: "Break Up Song" did not enter the Billboard Canadian Hot 100, but peaked at number 49 on the Hot Canadian Digital Song Sales chart.) | — | 18 | — | — (Note: "Break Up Song" did not enter the Single Top 100, but peaked at number 18 on the Dutch Single Tip chart.) | — (Note: "Break Up Song" did not enter the NZ Top 40 Singles Chart, but peaked at number nine on the NZ Hot Singles Chart.) | — | — | BPI: Platinum | Confetti |
| "Holiday" | 2020 | 15 | — | — (Note: "Holiday" did not enter the Billboard Canadian Hot 100, but peaked at number 46 on the Hot Canadian Digital Song Sales chart.) | — | 23 | — | — (Note: "Holiday" did not enter the Single Top 100, but peaked at number 20 on the Dutch Single Tip chart.) | — (Note: "Holiday" did not enter the NZ Top 40 Singles Chart, but peaked at number eleven on the NZ Hot Singles Chart.) | — (Note: "Holiday" did not enter the Swedish Singellista Chart, but peaked at number 19 on the Swedish Heatseeker Chart.) | — (Note: "Holiday" did not enter the Billboard Hot 100, but peaked at No. 18 on the Digital Songs Sales chart.) | BPI: Gold | Confetti |
| "Sweet Melody" | 2020 | 1 | — | — | — | 7 | — | — | — (Note: "Sweet Melody" did not enter the NZ Top 40 Singles Chart, but peaked at number eight on the NZ Hot Singles Chart.) | — | — (Note: "Sweet Melody" did not enter the Billboard Hot 100, but peaked at No. 39 on the Digital Songs Sales chart.) | BPI: 2× Platinum; RMNZ: Gold | Confetti |
| "No Time for Tears" (Note: "No Time for Tears" was originally released as a standalone single, but was later included on the digital expanded edition of Confetti.) (with Nathan Dawe) | 2020 | 19 | — | — | — | 15 | — | — | — | — | — (Note: "No Time for Tears" did not enter the Billboard Hot 100, but peaked at No. 22 on the Hot Dance/Electronic Songs chart.) | BPI: Gold | Confetti (Expanded Edition) |
| "Confetti" (featuring Saweetie or solo) | 2021 | 9 | — | — | — | 17 | — | — | — (Note: "Confetti" did not enter the NZ Top 40 Singles Chart, but peaked at number twelve on the NZ Hot Singles Chart.) | — | — (Note: "Confetti" did not enter the Billboard Hot 100, but peaked at No. 48 on the Digital Songs Sales chart.) | BPI: Platinum | Confetti |
| "Heartbreak Anthem" (with Galantis and David Guetta) | 2021 | 3 | 46 | 86 | — | 5 | — | 23 | — (Note: "Heartbreak Anthem" did not enter the NZ Top 40 Singles Chart, but peaked at number nine on the NZ Hot Singles Chart.) | 36 | — (Note: "Heartbreak Anthem" did not enter the Billboard Hot 100, but peaked at No. 6 on the Hot Dance/Electronic Songs chart.) | BPI: 2× Platinum; MC: Platinum; RIAA: Gold; RMNZ: Platinum | Rx |
| "Kiss My (Uh-Oh)" (with Anne-Marie) | 2021 | 10 | — | — (Note: "Kiss My (Uh-Oh)" did not enter the Billboard Canadian Hot 100, but peaked at number 43 on the Hot Canadian Digital Song Sales chart.) | — | 13 | — | — | — (Note: "Kiss My (Uh-Oh)" did not enter the NZ Top 40 Singles Chart, but peaked at number 10 on the NZ Hot Singles Chart.) | — | — | BPI: Platinum | Therapy |
| "Love (Sweet Love)" | 2021 | 33 | — | — | — | 40 | — | — | — (Note: "Love (Sweet Love)" did not enter the NZ Top 40 Singles Chart, but peaked at number 16 on the NZ Hot Singles Chart.) | — | — | | Between Us |
| "No" | 2021 | 35 | — | — | — | 41 | — | — | — (Note: "No" did not enter the NZ Top 40 Singles Chart, but peaked at number 23 on the NZ Hot Singles Chart.) | — | — | | Between Us |
| "Between Us" | 2021 | 47 | — | — | — | 48 | — | — | — (Note: "Between Us" did not enter the NZ Top 40 Singles Chart, but peaked at number 15 on the NZ Hot Singles Chart.) | — | — | | Between Us |
"—" denotes a recording that did not chart or was not released in that territory.

=== As featured artist ===
List of singles as featured artist, with selected chart positions
| Title | Year | Peak chart positions | | Album |
| Title | Year | UK | IRE | Album |
|---|---|---|---|---|
| "Wishing on a Star" (as part of The X Factor finalists 2011 featuring JLS and One Direction) | 2011 | 1 | 1 | Non-album single |

=== Promotional singles ===
List of promotional singles, with selected chart positions
| Title | Year | Peak chart positions | | | | | Certifications | Album |
| Title | Year | UK | AUS | FRA | IRE | NZ | Certifications | Album |
|---|---|---|---|---|---|---|---|---|
| "These Four Walls" | 2014 | 57 | — | — | — | — | | Salute |
| "Nothing Feels Like You" | 2014 | — | — | — | — | — | | Salute |
| "Towers" | 2014 | — | — | — | — | — | | Salute |
| "Stand Down" | 2014 | — | — | — | — | — | | Salute |
| "See Me Now" | 2014 | — | — | — | — | — | | Salute |
| "Hair" (solo version) | 2015 | 35 | 65 | 137 | 46 | — | | Get Weird |
| "Weird People" | 2015 | 78 | 125 | — | 97 | — | | Get Weird |
| "Grown" | 2015 | 72 | 105 | — | — | — | | Get Weird |
| "You Gotta Not" | 2016 | 61 | 96 | — | 88 | — (Note: "You Gotta Not" did not enter the NZ Top 40 Singles Chart, but peaked at number 4 on the NZ Heatseeker Singles Chart.) | BPI: Silver | Glory Days |
| "F.U." | 2016 | 82 | — | — | — | — (Note: "F.U." did not enter the NZ Top 40 Singles Chart, but peaked at number 7 on the NZ Heatseeker Singles Chart.) | | Glory Days |
| "Nothing Else Matters" | 2016 | — (Note: "Nothing Else Matters" did not enter the UK Singles Chart, but peaked at number 49 on the UK Singles Downloads Chart.) | — | — | — | — (Note: "Nothing Else Matters" did not enter the NZ Top 40 Singles Chart, but peaked at number 9 on the NZ Heatseeker Singles Chart.) | | Glory Days |
| "Nobody Like You" | 2016 | 185 | — | — | — | — | | Glory Days |
| "Down & Dirty" | 2016 | 159 | — | — | — | — | | Glory Days |
| "Joan of Arc" | 2018 | 61 | 135 | — | 63 | — (Note: "Joan of Arc" did not enter the NZ Top 40 Singles Chart, but peaked at number 14 on the NZ Hot Singles Chart.) | | LM5 |
| "Told You So" | 2018 | 83 | — | — | 83 | — (Note: "The Cure" did not enter the NZ Top 40 Singles Chart, but peaked at number 36 on the NZ Hot Singles Chart.) | | LM5 |
| "The Cure" | 2018 | 49 | — | — | 60 | — (Note: "The Cure" did not enter the NZ Top 40 Singles Chart, but peaked at number 22 on the NZ Hot Singles Chart.) | | LM5 |
| "More Than Words" (featuring Kamille) | 2018 | — | — | — | — | — (Note: "More Than Words" did not enter the NZ Top 40 Singles Chart, but peaked at number 20 on the NZ Hot Singles Chart.) | | LM5 |
| "Strip" (featuring Sharaya J) | 2018 | 25 | — | — | 32 | — (Note: "Strip" did not enter the NZ Top 40 Singles Chart, but peaked at number four on the NZ Hot Singles Chart.) | | LM5 |
| "Not a Pop Song" | 2020 | 49 | — | — | 37 | — (Note: "Not a Pop Song" did not enter the NZ Top 40 Singles Chart, but peaked at number five on the NZ Hot Singles Chart.) | | Confetti |
| "Happiness" | 2020 | 43 | — | — | 61 | — (Note: "Happiness" did not enter the NZ Top 40 Singles Chart, but peaked at number fifteen on the NZ Hot Singles Chart.) | | Confetti |
"—" denotes a recording that did not chart or was not released in that territory.

== Other charted and certified songs ==
List of songs, with selected chart positions
| Title | Year | Peak chart positions | | | Certifications | Album |
| Title | Year | UK | IRE | NZ | Certifications | Album |
|---|---|---|---|---|---|---|
| "Secret Love Song Pt. II" | 2015 | 179 | — | — | BPI: Silver | Get Weird |
| "A.D.I.D.A.S." | 2015 | 188 | — | — | | Get Weird |
| "Love Me or Leave Me" | 2015 | — | — | — | BPI: Gold; RMNZ: Gold | Get Weird |
| "Oops" (featuring Charlie Puth) | 2016 | 41 | 49 | — | BPI: Gold | Glory Days |
| "You Gotta Not" | 2016 | — | — | — | BPI: Silver | Glory Days |
| "Is Your Love Enough?" | 2017 | 47 | 44 | — (Note: "Is Your Love Enough?" did not enter the NZ Top 40 Singles Chart, but peaked at number four on the NZ Heatseeker Singles Chart.) | BPI: Silver | Glory Days: The Platinum Edition |
| "Wasabi" | 2018 | — | 85 | — (Note: "Wasabi" did not enter the NZ Top 40 Singles Chart, but peaked at number 19 on the NZ Hot Singles Chart.) | BPI: Silver; RMNZ: Gold | LM5 |
| "Cut You Off" | 2021 | 59 | 54 | — (Note: "Cut You Off" did not enter the NZ Top 40 Singles Chart, but peaked at number 34 on the NZ Hot Singles Chart.) | | Between Us |
"—" denotes a recording that did not chart or was not released in that territory.

== Featured appearances ==
| Title | Year | Other performer(s) | Album |
|---|---|---|---|
| "Une Autre Personne" | 2013 | Tal | À l'infini |
| "Dreamin' Together" | 2015 | Flower | Hanadokei |

== Music videos ==
| Title | Year | Other artist(s) | Director | Ref. |
|---|---|---|---|---|
| "Cannonball" | 2011 | None | Sarah Chatfield | |
| "Wings" | 2012 | None | Max & Dania | |
| "DNA" | 2012 | None | Sarah Chatfield | |
| "Change Your Life" | 2013 | None | Dominic O'Riordan; Warren Smith | |
| "How Ya Doin'?" | 2013 | Missy Elliott | Carly Cussen | |
| "Move" | 2013 | None | Carly Cussen | |
| "Little Me" | 2013 | None | Director X | |
| "Word Up!" | 2014 | None | Ben Turner | |
| "Salute" | 2014 | None | Colin Tilley | |
| "Dreamin' Together" | 2015 | Flower | Shigeaki Kubo | |
| "Black Magic" | 2015 | None | Director X | |
| "Love Me Like You" | 2015 | None | Sarah McColgan | |
| "Secret Love Song" | 2016 | Jason Derulo | Frank Borin | |
| "Hair" | 2016 | Sean Paul | Director X | |
| "Shout Out to My Ex" | 2016 | None | Sarah Chatfield | |
| "Touch" | 2017 | None | Director X Parris Goebel | |
| "No More Sad Songs" | 2017 | Machine Gun Kelly | Marc Klasfeld | |
| "Power" | 2017 | Stormzy | Hannah Lux Davis | |
| "Reggaetón Lento (Remix)" | 2017 | CNCO | Marc Klasfeld | |
| "Nothing Else Matters" (tour video) | 2017 | None | Adam Goodall | |
| "Only You" | 2018 | Cheat Codes | Frank Borin | |
| "Woman Like Me" | 2018 | Nicki Minaj | Marc Klasfeld | |
| "More Than Words" | 2018 | Kamille | Unknown | |
| "Strip" | 2018 | Sharaya J | Rankin and Little Mix | |
| "Think About Us" | 2019 | Ty Dolla Sign | Bradley & Pablo | |
| "Bounce Back" | 2019 | None | Charlotte Rutherford | |
| "One I've Been Missing" | 2019 | None | Laurence Warder | |
| "Wasabi" | 2020 | None | Callum Mills | |
| "Break Up Song" | 2020 | None | Zac Ella | |
| "Holiday" | 2020 | None | Sophia Ray | |
| "Sweet Melody" | 2020 | None | KC Locke | |
| "No Time for Tears" | 2021 | Nathan Dawe | Troy Roscoe | |
| "Confetti" | 2021 | Saweetie | Samuel Douek | |
| "Heartbreak Anthem" | 2021 | Galantis and David Guetta | Samuel Douek | |
| "Kiss My (Uh Oh)" | 2021 | Anne-Marie | Hannah Lux Davis | |
| "Love (Sweet Love)" | 2021 | None | Samuel Douek | |
| "No" | 2021 | None | Fred Rowson | |
| "Between Us" | 2021 | None | Callum Mills and Little Mix | |

== See also ==
- List of songs recorded by Little Mix
