= Cut You Off =

Cut You Off may refer to:

- "Cut You Off", a 2019 song by Selena Gomez from Rare
- "Cut You Off", a 2021 song by Little Mix from Between Us
- "Cut You Off", an unreleased song by Blaque
- "Cut You Off (To Grow Closer)", a 2010 song by Kendrick Lamar from Overly Dedicated
