= Between Us (Little Mix album) =

- Standard edition cover

Greatest hits album by Little Mix
- Released: 12 November 2021
- Recorded: 2011–2021
- Genres: Dance-pop; R&B
- Length: 78:54
- Labels: RCA; Columbia
- Producers: David Guetta; Electric; Eric Perez; Ester Dean; Galantis; Goldfingers; Jez Ashurst; Joe Kearns; Jorge Class; Kamille; Lostboy; Louis Bell; Luis Angel O'Neill; Maegan Cottone; Matt Rad; MNEK; Mojam; Nathan Duvall; Pete Nappi; Peoples; Richard Stannard; Rissi; Robin Oliver Frid; Stargate; Steve James; Steve Mac; Tayla Parx; TMS; Tre Jean-Marie

Little Mix chronology
Confetti (2020)	Between Us (2021)

Singles from Between Us
- 1. "Love (Sweet Love)" Released: 3 September 2021; 2. "No" Released: 12 November 2021; 3. "Between Us" Released: 3 December 2021

Between Us is a greatest hits album by British girl group Little Mix, released on 12 November 2021 through RCA and Columbia Records. Described by the members as a celebration of sisterhood, friendship and fun, the announcement was made as part of the group's celebrations commemorating the 10th anniversary since their formation on the eighth series of The X Factor UK. It was supported by the release of three songs, "Love (Sweet Love)", "No" and "Between Us".

The recording stages of the new songs took place during COVID-19 and Little Mix members Leigh-Anne Pinnock and Perrie Edwards' pregnancies. The album peaked at number three on the UK Albums Chart and reached the top five in Ireland, Scotland and Portugal and the top ten in Spain, Netherlands and Australia. In 2021, it was one of Sony Music's top ten best-selling albums globally of that year and has been certified Platinum by the BPI, ARIA, IFPI, and Gold by RMNZ and AMPROFON. As of June 2024, the album has spent 136 weeks on the UK Albums Charts, the second longest charting album by a girl group.

The album was made available in different versions, while the standard edition consists of Little Mix's biggest hits between 2011 and 2022, including four of their five UK number-one singles, "Wings", "Black Magic", "Shout Out to My Ex" and "Sweet Melody". Their debut solo single "Cannonball", which peaked at number one in the UK, is featured on the CD deluxe edition as the final track. The standard edition of the album includes two other new tracks titled "Between Us" and "Cut You Off", both of which charted on the UK Singles Chart. A fifth new song titled "Trash" was featured on the deluxe editions of the album.

== Background ==
Little Mix teased the project on 16 August 2021, three days before the official announcement, via their social media accounts by posting a video displaying all of their former logos, with a new one being shown at the end along with a snippet of one of the new songs, what would become the title track. On 18 August, the group shared a teaser on Twitter and Instagram using the hashtag #10YearsOfLittleMix. On 19 August, the day of their ten-year anniversary, the group then announced that they would be releasing a new album titled Between Us.

The track listing was announced a few hours later. The standard edition includes 22 tracks, featuring 18 of the group's previous singles and four new songs. A fifth new track was confirmed to be included on the deluxe editions of the album only. Little Mix described the album as "a celebration of 10 years of hits, friendship, new tracks and so much more". They also dedicated the album to their fans and thanked them for their support over the last ten years:

"We are so excited about this album. It includes all our hits, as well as some brand new songs we can't wait for you to hear...We can't thank you enough for your support over the last ten years... this album is for each and every one of you who's listened to our music, bought an album or sung your heart out at our shows. We wouldn't be here releasing this album if it wasn't for you."

— Little Mix on the new album announcement via Twitter.

Between Us became available for pre-order the same day as it was announced. The album was made available in a variety of physical formats, including on CD, cassette, as a box set and on picture disc vinyl with editions featuring each individual member in front of a floral backdrop. This also marked the group's first greatest hits album.

Group members Perrie Edwards, Jade Thirlwall and Leigh-Anne Pinnock went on to share their thoughts on the album. "We can't believe it has been 10 years. Time has flown and when you look back we have done so much that we're super proud of", Edwards said in an interview. "It's going to be great to have all our big hits as a band on one album for the first time, celebrating 10 massive years of Little Mix. The tracks also show how much we have grown as artists, from 'Wings' to 'Heartbreak Anthem'", added Thirlwall. Pinnock also went on to say, "We're also really excited to release five brand new Little Mix songs that we've been creating. We can't wait for our fans to hear the new tracks we've been working on. We hope they love them as much as we do!"

For the Japanese version of the album, Sony Music Japan allowed fans to vote on a song to be included on the album. "Happiness" won the poll, and the Japanese version of "Wings" was also included. Various editions of the album feature different shots from the photo shoot of the album, whilst the digital download, the Mixers and Experience editions all use the same cover as the deluxe edition but with different colours.

On 15 November 2021, Little Mix released the Mixers Edition of Between Us on Spotify, after asking fans in October to choose the order of the existing album tracks and 10 new songs to include.

== Singles ==
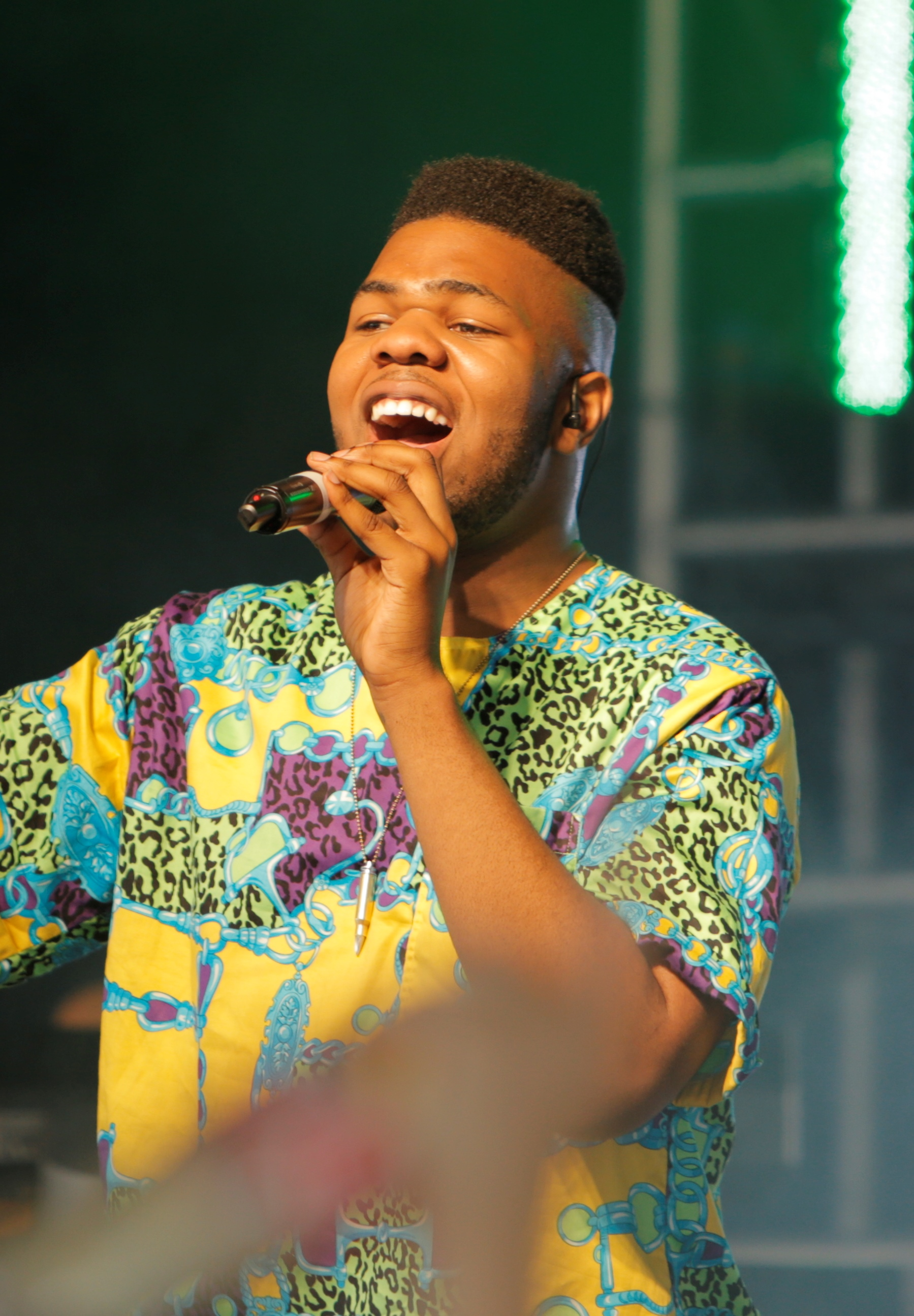
MNEK co-wrote the album's two singles.

Between Us, was supported by two single releases and features five new tracks in total. On 30 August 2021, the group announced that "Love (Sweet Love)" would serve as the lead single. Described as a pop song with lyrics that discusses independence, female empowerment and self-love. It was written by Jade Thirlwall, Leigh-Anne Pinnock, MNEK, Lauren Aquilina and Sakima. It was received positive reviews from critics with Lyndsey Havens from Billboard describing the new song as the "punchy, soulful pop stompers that fans have come to crave from Little Mix". The song peaked at number 33 on the UK Singles Chart, becoming the group's 31st top 40 single there.

On 12 November 2021, "No" was released as the next single alongside the album. It was the first song the group wrote together as a trio after the departure of former group member Jesy Nelson. Described as a dance-pop track, it reached number thirty-five on the UK Singles Chart

The album also featured two other songs "Trash" and "Cut You Off", which peaked at number fifty-nine in the United Kingdom and number fifty-four in Ireland.

=== Promotional singles ===
On 5 November 2021, "Between Us" was released as the album's promotional single, one week before the release of the Between Us album. The song was co-written by Jade Thirlwall, Perrie Edwards, Leigh-Anne Pinnock with MNEK, Tre Jean-Marie and Janee ‘Jin Jin’ Bennett. Little Mix described the track as a tribute to their friendship, with lyrics that references to some of the group's previous released singles.

The music video was released on 2 December 2021 alongside a message from the group announcing their hiatus after the Confetti Tour in 2022. The song received its debut performance the following day on 3 December 2021 on The Graham Norton Show.

== Commercial performance ==
Before the album was released, it was reported by Official Charts Company that at the midweek stage, Little Mix and Taylor Swift were contenders for the number-one spot. It was branded by some to be one of the closest chart battles to happen so far in the UK that year with a nine sale difference between the albums. On the UK Albums Chart, the album debuted at number four, selling 33,822 copies in its first week, becoming the group's seventh top-five album there. Between Us, was named as the twelfth biggest-selling cassette of 2021. On April 29, 2022, the album reached a new peak of number three after 24 weeks on the charts. On 13 May 2022, the album spent a 26th consecutive week inside the top twenty of the UK Albums Charts. As of June 2022, the album surpassed over 109,000 streams in the UK. On 11 November 2022, it became Little Mix first album since Glory Days (2016) to spend a full year on the UK Official Albums; becoming the fourteenth album by a girl group to achieve this.

Outside of the United Kingdom, the album debuted at number two on the Irish Albums Chart, becoming the group's seventh consecutive top ten album in Ireland. It missed out on the number one album spot to Taylor Swift's Red (Taylor's Version). On April 15, after The Confetti Tour, Between Us re-entered the official top ten albums charts at number three, spending 14 weeks inside the top ten of the charts there.

Between Us, reached number three in Portugal and Scotland and reached the top ten in Australia, Spain and the Netherlands. It also reached the top twenty in Belgium and New Zealand, the top thirty in Germany and the top forty in Austria, Italy and Poland. It also charted in other countries such as Japan, Canada and in the United States.

By the end of 2021, Little Mix was named as one of three UK acts to be featured on the top-ten best selling albums from Sony Music Entertainment. In July 2022, the album was named as the fifth biggest selling album so far in the UK, selling over 119,000 copies and becoming the biggest selling album there by a group. It finished as the ninth best-selling album of 2022 in the United Kingdom and has since been certified Platinum there. It was also certified Platinum in Australia and Switzerland, and Gold in Mexico. As of August 22, 2025, the album spent a total of 194 weeks in the UK charts.

=== Year-end lists ===
Between Us on year-end lists
Critic/Publication	List	Rank	Ref.
Sony Music	Top 10 Biggest Albums globally of 2021	10	
Official Charts	Biggest selling cassettes of 2021	12	
Official Charts	Biggest Albums of 2021	58	
Official Charts	Biggest Albums of 2022	9	
Official Charts	Biggest Albums of 2023	33	

== Track listing ==
=== Standard editions ===
Standard edition
No.	Title	Writer(s)	Producer(s)	Length
1.	"Wings" (from DNA, 2012)	Perrie Edwards; Jesy Nelson; Leigh-Anne Pinnock; Jade Thirlwall; Tom Barnes; Pete Kelleher; Ben Kohn; Iain James; Erika Nuri; Michelle Lewis; Mischke Butler; Heidi Rojas	TMS	3:39
2.	"DNA" (from DNA, 2012)	Edwards; Nelson; Pinnock; Thirlwall; Barnes; Kelleher; Kohn; I. James	TMS	3:56
3.	"Move" (from Salute, 2013)	Edwards; Nelson; Pinnock; Thirlwall; Maegan Cottone; Nathan Duvall	Duvall	3:44
4.	"Salute" (from Salute, 2013)	Edwards; Nelson; Pinnock; Thirlwall; Barnes; Kelleher; Kohn; Cottone	TMS	3:56
5.	"Black Magic" (from Get Weird, 2015)	Edvard Førre Erfjord; Henrik Michelsen; Ed Drewett; Camille Purcell	Electric	3:31
6.	"Secret Love Song, Pt. II" (from Get Weird, 2015)	Jez Ashurst; Emma Rohan; Rachel Furner	Ashurst	4:26
7.	"Hair" (featuring Sean Paul; from Get Weird, 2015)	Sean Paul; Erfjord; Michelsen; I. James; Purcell; Anita Blay	Electric	3:53
8.	"Shout Out to My Ex" (from Glory Days, 2016)	Edwards; Nelson; Pinnock; Thirlwall; Erfjord; Michelsen; Drewett; Purcell; I. James	Electric	4:06
9.	"Touch" (from Glory Days, 2016)	Hanni Ibrahim; Patrick Patrikios; A.S. Govere; Phil Plested	Cottone; MNEK	3:33
10.	"No More Sad Songs" (featuring Machine Gun Kelly; from Glory Days: The Platinum Edition, 2017)	Machine Gun Kelly; Erfjord; Michelsen; Emily Warren; Tash Phillips	Electric; Joe Kearns	3:45
11.	"Power" (featuring Stormzy; from Glory Days: The Platinum Edition, 2017)	Stormzy; Purcell; Dan Omelio; James Abrahart	Electric; Kearns; Matt Rad; Steve James	4:02
12.	"Reggaetón Lento" (remix, with CNCO; from CNCO and Glory Days: The Platinum Edition, 2017)	Luis Angel O'Neill; Eric Perez; Jadan Andino; Jorge Class; Yashua Camacho; Jean Rodríguez; Purcell	O'Neill; Perez; Class	3:08
13.	"Woman Like Me" (featuring Nicki Minaj; from LM5, 2018)	Nicki Minaj; Jess Glynne; Ed Sheeran; Steve Mac	Mac	3:48
14.	"Break Up Song" (from Confetti, 2020)	Edwards; Pinnock; Thirlwall; Purcell; Frank Nobel; Linus Nördstrom	Purcell; Goldfingers	3:20
15.	"Sweet Melody" (from Confetti, 2020)	Brian Garcia; Morten Ristorp; Robin Oliver Frid; Tayla Parx; Uzoechi Emenike	Parx; Frid; MNEK; Rissi; Peoples	3:33
16.	"Confetti" (featuring Saweetie; from Confetti, 2020)	Saweetie; Barnes; Kelleher; Kohn; Purcell; Emenike; Cottone	TMS	3:05
17.	"Heartbreak Anthem" (with Galantis and David Guetta)	Edwards; Pinnock; Thirlwall; Christian Karlsson; David Guetta; Jenna Andrews; Thom Bridges; Lorenzo Cosi; David Saint Fleur; Johnny Goldstein; Henrik Jonback; Yk Koi; Sorana Păcurar; Christopher Tempest	Guetta; Galantis	3:03
18.	"Kiss My (Uh-Oh)" (with Anne-Marie; from Therapy, 2021)	Anne-Marie; Purcell; Taylor Upsahl; Pete Nappi; Jacob Banfield	Mojam; Nappi	2:57
19.	"No"	Edwards; Pinnock; Thirlwall; Tre Jean-Marie; Purcell; Emenike	Jean-Marie; MNEK	3:03
20.	"Between Us"	Edwards; Pinnock; Thirlwall; Janée Bennett; Jean-Marie; Emenike	Jean-Marie	3:53
21.	"Love (Sweet Love)"	Thirlwall; Pinnock; Emenike; Sakima; Lauren Aquilina; Skye Edwards; Ross Godfrey; Paul Godfrey	MNEK	3:40
22.	"Cut You Off"	Thirlwall; Aquilina; Peter Rycroft	Lostboy	2:53
Total length:				78:54

Jade picture disc bonus tracks
No.	Title	Writer(s)	Producer(s)	Length
23.	"Mr Loverboy" (from Salute, 2013)	Ryan Williamson (RyKeyz); Jordan Dollar	RyKeyz	3:14
24.	"Wasabi" (from LM5, 2018)	Thirlwall; Emenike; Mike Sabath; Govere	Sabath; John Hill; Kearns	2:34

Leigh-Anne picture disc bonus tracks
No.	Title	Writer(s)	Producer(s)	Length
23.	"Nothing Feels Like You" (from Salute, 2013)	Emenike; Purcell; Edwards; Nelson; Pinnock; Thirlwall	MNEK	3:27
24.	"I Love You" (from Get Weird, 2015)	TMS; Purcell; Edwards; Nelson; Pinnock; Thirlwall	TMS	4:09

Perrie picture disc bonus tracks
No.	Title	Writer(s)	Producer(s)	Length
23.	"Love Me or Leave Me" (from Get Weird, 2015)	Rad; Julia Michaels; Shane Stevens	Rad	3:26
24.	"Your Love" (from Glory Days, 2016)	Purcell; Jeremy Coleman; Abrahart	JMIKE; Cottone	3:27

=== Deluxe editions ===
Digital deluxe edition
No.	Title	Writer(s)	Producer(s)	Length
1.	"Shout Out to My Ex"			4:06
2.	"Black Magic"			3:31
3.	"No"			3:03
4.	"Touch"			3:33
5.	"Love (Sweet Love)"			3:40
6.	"Wings"			3:39
7.	"Woman Like Me" (featuring Nicki Minaj)			3:48
8.	"Power" (featuring Stormzy)			4:02
9.	"Sweet Melody"			3:33
10.	"No More Sad Songs" (featuring Machine Gun Kelly)			3:45
11.	"DNA"			3:56
12.	"Secret Love Song" (featuring Jason Derulo)			4:09
13.	"Move"			3:44
14.	"Salute"			3:56
15.	"Break Up Song"			3:20
16.	"Between Us"			3:53
17.	"Secret Love Song, Pt. II"			4:26
18.	"Holiday"	Thirlwall; Edwards; Pinnock; Purcell; Chris Loco; Nobel; Nördstrom	Purcell; Goldfingers; Chris Loco	3:33
19.	"Hair" (featuring Sean Paul)			3:53
20.	"Reggaetón Lento" (remix, with CNCO)			3:08
21.	"Confetti" (featuring Saweetie)			3:05
22.	"Heartbreak Anthem" (with Galantis and David Guetta)			3:03
23.	"Kiss My (Uh-Oh)" (with Anne-Marie)			2:57
24.	"Cut You Off"			2:54
25.	"Trash"	Mabel McVey; Purcell; Emenike; Jean-Marie	Jean-Marie; MNEK	2:53
26.	"Wasabi"			2:34

== Charts ==
=== Weekly charts ===
Weekly chart performance for Between Us
Chart (2021–2022)	Peak position
Australian Albums (ARIA)	8
Austrian Albums (Ö3 Austria)	36
Belgian Albums (Ultratop Flanders)	11
Belgian Albums (Ultratop Wallonia)	25
Canadian Albums (Billboard)	53
Czech Albums (ČNS IFPI)	54
Dutch Albums (Album Top 100)	9
French Albums (SNEP)	47
Finnish Albums (Suomen virallinen lista)	44
German Albums (Offizielle Top 100)	21
Hungarian Albums (MAHASZ)	18
Irish Albums (Official Charts)	2
Italian Albums (FIMI)	31
Japanese Albums (Oricon)	65
Japanese Hot Albums (Billboard Japan)	73
Lithuanian Albums (AGATA)	94
New Zealand Albums (RMNZ)	16
Polish Albums (ZPAV)	32
Portuguese Albums (AFP)	3
Scottish Albums (Official Charts)	3
Slovak Albums (ČNS IFPI)	78
Spanish Albums (Promusicae)	7
Swiss Albums (Schweizer Hitparade)	43
UK Albums (Official Charts)	3
US Billboard 200	182

=== Year-end charts ===
2021 year-end chart performance for Between Us
Chart (2021)	Position
UK Albums (OCC)	58

2022 year-end chart performance for Between Us
Chart (2022)	Position
Australian Albums (ARIA)	68
New Zealand Albums (RMNZ)	34
UK Albums (OCC)	9

2023 year-end chart performance for Between Us
Chart (2023)	Position
UK Albums (OCC)	33

2024 year-end chart performance for Between Us
Chart (2024)	Position
UK Albums (OCC)	56

2025 year-end chart performance for Between Us
Chart (2025)	Position
UK Albums (OCC)	77

== Certifications ==
Certifications for Between Us
Region	Certification	Certified units/sales
Australia (ARIA)	Platinum	70,000^{‡}
Mexico (AMPROFON)	Gold	70,000^{‡}
New Zealand (RMNZ)	Platinum	15,000^{‡}
Switzerland (IFPI Switzerland)	Platinum	20,000^{‡}
United Kingdom (BPI)	2× Platinum	600,000
^{‡} Sales+streaming figures based on certification alone.
