= Bad Thing =

Single by Jesy Nelson
- Released: 14 April 2023
- Genre: Indie pop
- Length: 3:34
- Label: Self-released
- Composers: Hanni Ibrahim; Victor Frank; Patrick Jordan-Patrikios
- Lyricists: Jesy Nelson; Em Walcott; Tayla Parx
- Producer: Loose Change

Jesy Nelson singles chronology
"Boyz" (2021)	"Bad Thing" (2023)	"Mine" (2024)

Music video
- "Bad Thing" on YouTube

"Bad Thing" is a song by British singer Jesy Nelson, released independently on 14 April 2023. It is the follow-up to her debut single "Boyz" (2021) and her first release after her departure from Polydor Records in 2022. Co-written by Nelson, Tayla Parx and Em Walcott, it lyrically addresses a turbulent relationship with themes focused around domestic violence. The music video was praised, after Nelson worked with Women's Aid to present a graphic detail of the highs and lows of being in an abusive relationship. The song entered and peaked at number 15 on the UK Singles Downloads Chart.

== Background and release ==
Nelson first teased the release of "Bad Thing" on her social media pages with a short video clip captioned "It's time". The single artwork was also revealed on the same day as the announcement single. The cover single shows Nelson wearing 1960s style clothes with platform heels, a high-waisted skirt with a beehive hairstyle. The single was released onto all major streaming platforms on 14 April 2023.

== Production and composition ==
"Bad Thing" was written by Jesy Nelson, Em Walcott, and Tayla Parx. Lyrically it addresses a dysfunctional relationship with themes focused around infidelity, addiction, and domestic violence. The lyrics was also inspired by Nelson's childhood growing up with a dad who was in and out of prison. It was composed by Hanni Ibrahim, Victor Francois and Patrick Jordan-Patrikios and produced by Loose Change.

"Bad Thing" has been described as a jazz-infused indie pop song, with comparisons made to Lana Del Rey and Billie Eilish. Furthermore, it's been described as reminiscing Old Hollywood, with soaring strings and a haunting piano with heavy production that is rich and immersive.

== Critical reception ==
In an exclusive first listen for Official Charts, Carl Smith's reaction was positive, describing it as "Jesy returning with a sultry, string-laden single that sees her explore a new sound". He drew comparisons to Lana Del Rey with its soaring strings and haunting piano that could draw comparisons to Billie Eilish, further adding that "Bad Thing oozes old Hollywood; its instrument-heavy production rich and immersive". Her vocal tone was also praised, as "Confident, vulnerable and powerful" with comparisons made to her tones that she used in Little Mix's previous songs "Good Enough", "Turn Your Face" and "F.U."

The music video was also received well. After the release of "Bad Thing" the music video was praised by Women's Aid, a domestic violence charity, who Nelson collaborated with over the visuals and storytelling of the video to raise awareness on domestic abuse. In a statement they commented:

"We thank Jesy for using the music video for Bad Thing to signpost support for women who may be affected by domestic abuse. Jesy's video shows her character not explicitly leaving at the end, and we know from our work with survivors of domestic abuse that this is a reality for many, with as many as 1.7 million women experiencing domestic abuse in the UK and Wales last year alone. Jesy's video highlights that it is not easy to leave an abusive relationship and for many women using our network of services across the country, the average length of time in abusive relationships before leaving is just over six years."
– Women's Aid on working with Nelson for the video.

Nicole Vassell from The Independent, described it as an emotional jazz-infused ballad, while Nmesoma Okechukeu from Euphoria Magazine, described it as an indie-pop sound reminiscent of Lana Del Rey and Billie Eilish.

== Music video ==
The music video for "Bad Thing" was made in collaboration with Women's Aid, a domestic violence charity. It was produced by Untold Studios and directed by Charlie Sarsfield. Set in London's East End in the 1960s, it features Nelson portraying a barmaid who meets her boyfriend, Sid, and deals with addiction and infidelity. The relationship becomes violent and sees Nelson's character struggle to leave the relationship. The video draws inspiration from the movie Legend in terms of styling and art.

== Promotion ==
To promote "Bad Thing", Nelson was interviewed on The One Show, where a clip from the music video was also aired.

== Charts ==
Chart performance for "Bad Thing"
Chart (2023)	Peak position
UK Singles Downloads (Official Charts)	15
UK Singles Sales (OCC)	17
