= No (Little Mix song) =

Single by Little Mix

from the album Between Us
- Released: 12 November 2021
- Recorded: 2021
- Length: 3:03
- Label: RCA
- Songwriters: Jade Thirlwall; Leigh-Anne Pinnock; Perrie Edwards; MNEK; Tre Jean-Marie; Camille Purcell
- Producers: Tre Jean-Marie; MNEK

Little Mix singles chronology
"Love (Sweet Love)" (2021)	"No" (2021)

Music video
- "No" on YouTube

"No" is a song by British girl group Little Mix. It was released on 12 November 2021 through RCA Records as the second single from their first greatest hits album Between Us. It was written by group members Jade Thirlwall, Leigh-Anne Pinnock and Perrie Edwards, along with Tre Jean-Marie, MNEK and Camille, with production by Tre Jean-Marie and MNEK. It was the group's last single release before their hiatus in May 2022, and reached number thirty-five on the UK Singles Chart. It was performed for the first time during The Confetti Tour the same year.

== Background and release ==
"No" was the group's first song to be written as a trio, after Jesy Nelson had departed from the group in 2020. Lyrically, the song was inspired by the group's own treatment within the music industry and dealing with past individuals. It was described by Pinnock as "a classic Little Mix track, but also fresh and new at the same time", while Thirlwall explained that "the writing session with Kamille, MNEK, and Tre, had really good energy. We had a good old catch-up and got to write a bop."

The title of the song was announced on 29 October 2021 through the group's social media pages On 8 November 2021, a snippet of the music video was teased on the group's social media accounts. The cover art was revealed on 10 November 2021 with a second snippet of the music video being released on 11 November 2021.

== Music video ==
The music video was released on 12 November 2021, the same day as the song's release. It was directed by Fred Rowson and became the fifth Little Mix video that Perrie Edwards and Leigh-Anne Pinnock filmed while pregnant.

The video features Little Mix members as "desperate housewives" that take control of the man-child men in their lives by getting them to do chores via a remote control.

== Track listings ==
Digital download and streaming - acoustic version

1. "No" (acoustic version) - 3:15

Digital download and streaming - Galantis remix

1. "No" (Galantis remix) - 3:06

Digital extended play (EP)

1. "No" (acoustic version) - 3:15
2. "No" (Galantis remix) - 3:06

== Charts ==
Chart performance for "No"
Chart (2021)	Peak position
Ireland (IRMA)	41
Latvia (EHR Top 40)	18
New Zealand Hot Singles (RMNZ)	23
UK Singles (OCC)	35

== Release history ==
Region	Date	Format(s)	Version	Label(s)	Ref.
Various	12 November 2021	Digital download; streaming	Galantis Remix	RCA Records	
Various	12 November 2021	Digital download; streaming	Digital EP	RCA Records	
Various	19 November 2021	Digital download; streaming	Acoustic	RCA Records	
