= Boyz (Jesy Nelson song) =

2021 debut single by Jesy Nelson featuring Nicki Minaj

Single by Jesy Nelson featuring Nicki Minaj
- Released: 8 October 2021
- Recorded: 2021
- Genre: Hip hop; R&B
- Length: 3:00
- Label: Polydor; Republic
- Songwriters: Oladayo Olatunji; Hanni Ibrahim; Jesy Nelson; Onika Maraj-Petty; Abby Keen; Amanda Atoui; Avital Levy; Patrick Jordan-Patrikios
- Producer: Loose Change

Jesy Nelson singles chronology
| "Boyz" (2021) | "Bad Thing" (2023) |

Nicki Minaj singles chronology
| "Whole Lotta Money" (remix) (2021) | "Boyz" (2021) | "Do We Have a Problem?" (2022) |

Music video
- "Boyz" on YouTube

"Boyz" is the debut solo single by the English singer Jesy Nelson featuring the American rapper Nicki Minaj; marking the second collaboration between both artists after "Woman Like Me" in 2018 when Nelson was part of Little Mix. It was released on 8 October 2021, through Polydor Records, becoming her only release with that label after parting ways with them in 2022. It is also Nelson's first single to be released since leaving the girl group Little Mix in 2020. It heavily interpolates American rapper Diddy's 2001 song "Bad Boy for Life". Lyrically, "Boyz" speaks of Nelson's infatuation with rebellious men.

The song debuted at number four on the UK Singles Chart, charting for seven weeks and reached number sixteen in Ireland, but failed to sustain its success in subsequent weeks. It received negative reviews from critics, with the music video sparking controversy due to her intentional blackfishing and cultural appropriation. Nelson's performance at the 2021 Jingle Bell Ball was widely mocked by viewers and yielded numerous internet memes that were circulated across social media.

== Background ==
In December 2020, Nelson announced she was leaving Little Mix for mental health reasons. A few months later, she signed a record deal with Polydor Records. Nelson teased a comeback in August 2021, saying: "For me, this is the music that I've always wanted to make. I don't think that anyone is gonna expect this."

On 28 September 2021, Nelson confirmed that her first solo single, "Boyz", was being released soon. Nelson said that a "horrible breakup" inspired the single. In an interview with Noctis Magazine, Nelson described the song as "in your face", adding: "I wrote it when I was going through a break-up and it's me all over. I just love a bad boy. I say it to people all the time... it's not healthy!"

Nelson shared a teaser of the single on Instagram, showing her practicing the choreography.

When asked about working with Nicki Minaj, Nelson said in an interview with Paper:

I've worked with Nicki Minaj before when I was in the band, on "Woman Like Me", so I already had a relationship with her, but when I wrote this song I knew I wanted Nicki on it. There was no one else I wanted. She was so perfect for it and we're label buddies, so our label helped make it happen. They sent her the song and she loved it and said she wanted to jump on it, which was amazing.

== Composition ==
"Boyz" has elements of R&B and hip hop, and includes a rap verse written and performed by Nicki Minaj. The track was written by Nelson, Minaj, Oladayo Olatunji, Hanni Ibrahim, Abby Keen, Amanda Atoui, and Avital and produced by the duo Loose Change (Patrick Jordan-Patrikios and Sunny) "Boyz" has been variously described as either sampling or interpolating Diddy's 2001 song "Bad Boy for Life".

== Commercial performance ==
"Boyz" debuted at number four on the UK Singles (OCC) chart, making it Nelson's first top-10 single as a solo artist and Minaj's 13th. It dropped to number eighteen the following week, and spent seven weeks in the chart.

It debuted at number thirteen on the US Bubbling Under Hot 100 Singles (Billboard) chart, and number thirty-nine on the US Mainstream Top 40 (Billboard) chart. In New Zealand, "Boyz" debuted at number four on the New Zealand Hot Singles (RMNZ) chart, the ranking of songs out of the top 40. In Ireland the song debuted at number sixteen on the Ireland (IRMA) chart, The song entered the Hungary (Single Top 40) chart at number fifteen. Globally, "Boyz" debuted and peaked at number 86 on the Billboard Global 200.

== Critical reception ==
"Boyz" was critically panned upon release. The Guardian writer Laura Snapes gave it two-out-of-five stars, finding the song derivative and dated, concluding: "The long-awaited debut is a farrago of incomprehensible lyrics and queasy tropes that undermines her [Nelson's] self-help journey". Roisin O'Connor of The Independent wrote that "Boyz" is "a terrible song on which a barely comprehensible Nelson sings like Britney Spears doing TLC karaoke, lisping and gasping her way around a sample of Diddy's 'Bad Boy For Life'. Where Diddy's original was gritty, sharp and visceral, Nelson's has been polished and autotuned to death". She considered Nelson's solo career debut "one of the most disastrous in recent memory." Rolling Stone India listed it among the worst songs of 2021, saying that it's "probably the dumbest debut single by any boy or girl group member to depart their respective band". Insider also included the song in their list of the worst songs of 2021, saying that it is "a reductive and stale take on a hip-hop classic".

== Music video ==
The music video was released on 8 October 2021, the same day as the song's release. The video was inspired by the original "Bad Boy For Life" music video, with Diddy himself appearing in a cameo playing the role Ben Stiller played in the original video. In the video, Nelson wears grills on her teeth, braids, bandanas, and sings about liking men who are "so hood". The video has reached 20 million views on YouTube. Critics noted the video has scenes "mimicking classic 2000s hip-hop videos".

=== Controversy ===
On the day of the release of the music video, Nelson faced accusations of both cultural appropriation and blackfishing for her appearance in the music video. Raven Smith of Vogue noted that Nelson's skin tone looked "unnaturally, un-genetically tanned" and that she was "parroting the aesthetics of Blackness". The Guardian writer Mikki Kendall said that Nelson "will dispose of her Black costume when it no longer serves her" and that she "exemplifies the exact attitude that makes this type of racist cosplay so desirable. She's able to make jabs at the person whose appearance she's seemingly jealous of and insists she's not racist, too." The Independent writer Roisin O'Connor called it "a grotesque caricature of what Nelson perceives Black culture to be".

In response, Nelson said, "I take all those comments made seriously. I would never intentionally do anything to make myself look racially ambiguous, so that's why I was initially shocked that the term was directed at me." In an Instagram Live, Nelson said furthermore that her "intention was never ever to offend people of colour with the video" and that she instead wanted to "celebrate 90's R&B because that era of music is what I love." She shared, "It actually does really hurt me that it may have offended people." Minaj defended Nelson from the accusations. British TV presenter Charlene White, of Jamaican descent, called Nelson and Minaj's explanation of the video "embarrassing".

== Live performances ==
Nelson's debut solo performance of "Boyz" took place on The Graham Norton Show on 29 October 2021. Nelson further performed "Boyz" at the 2021 Jingle Bell Ball on 11 December 2021. The performances resulted in a number of memes being spread on various social media platforms mocking Jesy after she screamed “Are you ready” followed by repeated jolting shoulder arm movements and a voice in the crowd responding “No we’re not”.

== Track listing ==
- Digital download / streaming
1. "Boyz" (featuring Nicki Minaj) – 3:00
- UK CD single
1. "Boyz" (featuring Nicki Minaj) – 3:00
2. "Boyz" (acoustic) – 2:34

== Charts ==
Chart performance for "Boyz"
| Chart (2021) | Peak position |
|---|---|
| Global 200 (Billboard) | 86 |
| Hungary (Single Top 40) | 15 |
| Ireland (IRMA) | 16 |
| New Zealand Hot Singles (RMNZ) | 4 |
| Romania (Airplay 100) | 89 |
| UK Singles (Official Charts) | 4 |
| US Bubbling Under Hot 100 (Billboard) | 13 |
| US Pop Airplay (Billboard) | 39 |

== Certifications ==
Certifications for "Boyz"
| Region | Certification | Certified units/sales |
|---|---|---|
| United Kingdom (BPI) | Silver | 200,000^{‡} |
^{‡} Sales+streaming figures based on certification alone.

== Release history ==
Release dates and formats for "Boyz"
| Region | Date | Format(s) | Label | Ref. |
|---|---|---|---|---|
| Various | 8 October 2021 | Digital download; streaming | Polydor | |
| United Kingdom | 8 October 2021 | CD single | Universal | |
| Australia | 11 October 2021 | Contemporary hit radio | Universal | |
