= Love (Sweet Love) =

2021 Single by Little Mix

Single by Little Mix

from the album Between Us
- Released: 3 September 2021
- Recorded: 2021
- Genre: Pop; synth-pop
- Length: 3:40
- Label: RCA
- Songwriters: Jade Thirlwall; Leigh-Anne Pinnock; MNEK; Sakima; Lauren Aquilina; Ross Godfrey; Paul Godfrey; Skye Edwards
- Producers: MNEK; Sakima

Little Mix singles chronology
"Kiss My (Uh-Oh)" (2021)	"Love (Sweet Love)" (2021)	"No" (2021)

Music video
- "Love (Sweet Love)" on YouTube

"Love (Sweet Love)" is a song by British girl group Little Mix. It was released on 3 September 2021 through RCA Records as a single in support of their greatest hits album Between Us. The song was written by group members Leigh-Anne Pinnock and Jade Thirlwall, along with Lauren Aquilina, MNEK and Sakima; the latter two also produced the song.

"Love (Sweet Love)" was met with generally positive reviews from critics. Described as a pop song with elements of synth-pop and soul music, with lyrics that explores themes of female empowerment, independence, and self-love. On the UK Singles Chart it reached number 33, becoming Little Mix's 31st top 40 single. It also reached the top forty in Ireland, Croatia, Latvia and Hungary. Little Mix performed the track for the first time during The Confetti Tour, in 2022.

== Background and release ==
On 29 August 2021, Little Mix teased the song by posting a short snippet of the music video on their social media accounts. The song was announced on 30 August 2021, with a new snippet of the music video released the next day. On 2 September 2021, a snippet of the song was released on the online video-sharing platform, TikTok, a day before the official release of the song. "Love (Sweet Love)" was released on 3 September 2021, along with an accompanying music video. This marked the group's first official song as a trio after Jesy Nelson's departure from the group in 2020.

“We are so excited for ‘Love (Sweet Love)’ to be the first single released from Between Us. We loved shooting the video for this song, it feels like a real moment and we can’t wait to share it.”

— Leigh-Anne Pinnock on the release of "Love (Sweet Love)".

== Composition ==
"Love (Sweet Love)" is a pop song written by group members Jade Thirlwall and Leigh-Anne Pinnock, with MNEK, Sakima and Lauren Aquilina. The members of Morcheeba, Ross Godfrey, Paul Godfrey and Skye Edwards, were also given a writing credit, as the song samples Morcheeba's 2000 track "Love Sweet Love". MNEK and Sakima also handled the production. The song runs for a total length of three minutes and forty seconds. Lyrically, the song discusses independence, female empowerment, and self-love, with the lyrics "I don't need your love to love me. Need my own celebration, yeah, Solo stimulation, yeah, Kiss my imagination. I don't need your love to love me" included in the song.

== Music video ==
The music video was released on 3 September 2021, the same day as the song's release. It was directed by Samuel Douek, who had also directed the music videos for the group's previous singles "Confetti" and "Heartbreak Anthem". In the video, the group appears as "gold-adorned goddesses" sat on thrones and dressed in gold gowns with golden headpieces, surrounded by worshippers in a garden greenhouse.

In an Instagram post, Douek said that "The concept was inspired by the Pre-Raphaelite art movement and the lesser known Sisterhood that romanticised nature and emboldened women through painting". He continued by explaining that he wanted to "celebrate Little Mix as the regal queens they are; unimpressed by a cohort of Knights that vie for their attention". Douek then described the song as a "a celebration of self-love and female empowerment" and admired Edwards and Pinnock for their performance in the video, as they were pregnant at the time the video was shot. The video also contains choreography by Khloe Dean and the art direction was directed by Furmaan Ahmed.

== Critical reception ==
Lyndsey Havens from Billboard included the song in a list of ten cool pop new songs and described it as "the kind of punchy, soulful pop stompers that fans have come to crave from Little Mix".

Rolling Stone India said that "Love (Sweet Love)” "encapsulates the group's long-established personas as icons of empowerment and self-love ... The synth-pop track employs Little Mix's arsenal of harmonies and vocal variations, giving the single a fresh, anthemic feel."

Conor Clark from Gay Times said "'Love (Sweet Love)' is about love and passion which features vocal harmonies from the trio".

== Track listing ==
Digital download and streaming

1. "Love (Sweet Love)" – 3:40

Digital download and streaming – acoustic

1. "Love (Sweet Love)" (acoustic version) – 3:44

Digital download and streaming – Dopamine remix

1. "Love (Sweet Love)" (Dopamine remix) – 4:01

Digital download and streaming – Emily Nash remix

1. "Love (Sweet Love)" (Emily Nash remix) – 3:18

Digital download and streaming – Shane Codd remix

1. "Love (Sweet Love)" (Shane Codd remix) – 3:18

Digital EP

1. "Love (Sweet Love)" (Dopamine remix) – 4:01
2. "Love (Sweet Love)" (Emily Nash remix) – 3:18
3. "Love (Sweet Love)" (Shane Codd remix) – 3:18
4. "Love (Sweet Love)" (acoustic version) – 3:44

== Charts ==
Chart performance for "Love (Sweet Love)"
Chart (2021)	Peak position
Croatia (HRT)	37
Euro Digital Songs (Billboard)	11
Hungary (Single Top 40)	39
Ireland (IRMA)	40
Latvia (EHR Top 40)	38
New Zealand Hot Singles (RMNZ)	16
UK Singles (OCC)	33

== Release history ==
Release dates and formats for "Love (Sweet Love)"
Region	Date	Format(s)	Version	Label	Ref.
Various	3 September 2021	Digital download; streaming	Original; Digital EP	RCA Records	
Various	24 September 2021	Digital download; streaming	Acoustic	RCA Records	
Various	24 September 2021	Digital download; streaming	Dopamine Remix	RCA Records	
Various	8 October 2021	Digital download; streaming	Emily Nash Remix	RCA Records	
Various	15 October 2021	Digital download; streaming	Shane Codd Remix	RCA Records	
