= Sakima (singer) =

English singer-songwriter (born 1991)

- Born: Isaac Sakima; 20 March 1991 (age 35); Newcastle upon Tyne, England, UK
- Origin: London
- Genres: Alternative pop; electro-R&B; pop; R&B
- Occupations: Singer-songwriter, producer
- Years active: 2014–present

Isaac Sakima (born 20 March 1991), known professionally as Sakima, is an English singer-songwriter and producer.

== Early life ==
Isaac Sakima is originally from Newcastle upon Tyne, but was raised in Milton Keynes. He later returned to Newcastle and identifies as a Geordie. At the age of 6, Sakima felt his first gay attraction towards another classmate. He started making music at 8 years old.

== Career ==
Sakima is a London-based singer-songwriter. His debut single "Energy" was premiered by Zane Lowe on BBC Radio 1 in August 2014 and was described as a "moody pop ballad". He has worked with Cyril Hahn and Ryan Hemsworth. Sakima was working with a Chicago-based manager Ardie Farhadieh and the company Wick Management. Farhadieh connected Sakima with Jakwob and his label Boom Ting for his song "Energy". In 2014, Sakima was managed by the UK-based company, Empire.

In May 2017 Sakima released his debut EP, Facsimile, containing four-tracks. Out describes Facsimile as "an accidental gateway into queer eroticism". The opening track is titled "I Used to Have an En Suite". Other tracks include "He's Trippi" and "Happy Hr". "He's Trippi" was influenced by Zayn Malik's "She". Sakima liked the song but noticed the pronouns and highly sexualised nature of the song. He wanted to release a song using pronouns applicable to gay people.

He released his EP Ricky on 13 October 2017. On the seven-track EP, Sakima sings about the rejection of heteronormativity and explores Polari. The track "Daddy", featuring YLXR, used Polari in a queer-themed song inspired by "Work from Home". Sakima released the single "Death Is in the Air" on 16 February 2018 after hearing Justin Tranter's interview on the And the Writer Is... podcast. He released the LGBT-themed single "Show Me" in 2018, which explores homophobia and cruising for sex.

In 2018, R3hab released the album The Wave, including the track "Back to You" with Sakima. On 14 September 2018, Sakima released the single "Holy Water" from his debut album Project Peach, which was released in 2019. Joshua Bote of Billboard describes "Holy Water" as "with a reverb-and-trap-heavy fog surrounding him, he treads through self-love as a spiritual exercise, in effect, turning RuPaul's iconic mantra into a prayer of sorts". His single "Apps" was inspired by hookup culture and the relationship complications caused by dating apps.

In 2021, Sakima released the single "Sleepy Head" and co-wrote several singles for other artists, such Little Mix's "Love (Sweet Love)" and Regard, Troye Sivan and Tate McRae's "You".

== Artistry ==
In the media, Sakima has been described as a "R&B artist", "alternative pop singer", "electro-R&B musician", and a "pop artist". Sakima sings pop and R&B songs with queer themes. Sakima stated that he aims to add queer stories and a gay perspective to traditional pop and R&B music with the hope of normalising LGBT experiences.

== Personal life ==
Sakima lives in London. He is a gay man. On his sexuality, Sakima reported that "I never 'realized' I was gay...I always knew. I've never known anything different. I've never known what it's like to be in the closet. I've never known what it's like to be separate from that part of yourself".

== Discography ==
=== Albums ===
List of albums
Title	Details
Project Peach	Released: 16 August 2019

=== Extended plays ===
List of extended plays
Title	Details
Facsimile	Released: May 12, 2017; Label: Moving Castle; Format: Digital download
Ricky	Released: 13 October 2017; Label: Independent; Format: Digital download

=== Singles ===
- "Energy" (2014)
- "Death Is in the Air" (2018)
- "Show Me" (2018)
- "Back To You" (2018) with R3hab
- "Holy Water" (2018)
- "Apps" (2018)
- "Virtus Domum" (2018)
- "U Dnt Fk Me Up" (2020)
- "Sleepy Head" (2021)

== See also ==
- LGBT culture in London
