= DNA (Little Mix album) =

Studio album by Little Mix
- Released: 19 November 2012
- Recorded: December 2011 – September 2012
- Genres: Pop; dance-pop; R&B
- Length: 43:50
- Labels: Syco; Columbia
- Producers: TMS; Future Cut; Steve Mac; Brian Higgins; Richard "Biff" Stannard; Ash Howes; Tim Powell; Jon Levine; Xenomania; Paul Meehan; Matt Furmidge; Robbie Lamond; Fred Ball; Pegasus; Dapo Torimiro; Ester Dean

Little Mix chronology
DNA (2012)	Salute (2013)

Singles from DNA
- 1. "Wings" Released: 24 August 2012; 2. "DNA" Released: 9 November 2012; 3. "Change Your Life" Released: 15 February 2013; 4. "How Ya Doin'?" Released: 15 April 2013

DNA is the debut studio album by British girl group Little Mix, released on 19 November 2012 through Syco Music and Columbia Records. The recording stages for the album took place between December 2011 and concluded in September 2012. Throughout the recording process, the group worked with several producers, with the album being largely co-written by them and other girl group members, Nicola Roberts of Girls Aloud, Shaznay Lewis of All Saints and T-Boz of TLC. The group stated that they were involved in the development of the album as much as possible.

When released, the album was met with positive reviews from music critics. The album is primarily a mixture of pop and R&B records, with influences from dance-pop, pop rock and hip hop which is found on other songs. The album's lyrical content addresses the themes of heartbreak, empowerment, relationships, friendships, and mental health. The album's lead single, "Wings", reached number one in the UK and Ireland as well as charting in Australia, New Zealand, Slovakia, Czech Republic, Hungary, Belgium, Canada and the US. The album's second single "DNA", peaked at number three in the UK and was followed up with two other singles "Change Your Life" and a remix of "How Ya Doin'?" featuring American rapper Missy Elliott, both of which reached the top 20 in the UK.

On the UK Albums DNA, peaked at number three and sold over 234,000 copies by the end of 2012. The album peaked at number two in Czech Republic, and peaked within the top ten of the Irish, Italian, Scottish, Australian, Norwegian Albums Charts. In the United States, DNA reached number four on the US Billboard 200, making them the first British girl group since the Spice Girls to reach the top ten, and later breaking the record for having the highest chart entry for a debut album by British girl group, breaking a record previously held by the Spice Girls' debut album Spice (1996). It also had the highest chart entry there for female group’s debut album since Danity Kane in 2006.

== Background ==
In 2011, Perrie Edwards, Jade Thirlwall, Leigh-Anne Pinnock and Jesy Nelson individually auditioned successfully as soloists for the eighth series of the UK version of The X Factor in front of judges Louis Walsh, Gary Barlow, Tulisa and Kelly Rowland. However, during the bootcamp stage, the judges regrouped them into a four-piece girl group, sending them through to judges' houses in the groups category. The group, rechristened Little Mix, were mentored by Tulisa and reached the live shows, and survived the public vote each week without ever being in the bottom two. During the final on 11 December 2011, Little Mix were announced as the winners, becoming the first ever group to win the show, with their winners' single being a cover of Damien Rice's song "Cannonball".

On 25 January 2012, the group made an appearance at the National Television Awards, and performed the En Vogue song "Don't Let Go (Love)". They also accompanied X Factor judges Barlow and Tulisa on stage to receive the Best Talent Show award won by the programme. During an interview backstage, the group confirmed that they themselves had been writing material for their debut album, but had not yet received any input from Barlow, and that plans to release their next single in March of that year were underway. It was announced, shortly after, that the release of the single had been delayed, and would now not be released until August.

On 30 May 2012, the group announced through a live stream via Twitcam that their new single would be called "Wings", and a short snippet would premiere on Channel 4 that week after being played at their filming session for Alan Carr: Chatty Man. The group performed the single for the first time at the T4 on the Beach concert on 1 July 2012. "Wings" received its official premiere on BBC Radio 1 on 2 July 2012 and was released on 24 August 2012, reaching number one in the UK and Ireland as well as charting in Australia, New Zealand, Slovakia, Czech Republic, Hungary, Belgium, Canada and the US. The second single, "DNA", was released on 9 November 2012, peaking at number three in the UK. The album's third single, "Change Your Life", was released on 15 February 2013 and a remix of "How Ya Doin'?" featuring American rapper Missy Elliott was released on 15 April 2013 as the fourth and final single from the album, bot of which reached the top 20 in the UK.

On 17 September, the album's artwork was unveiled via the group's official Facebook page, which also confirmed that the album's second single, "DNA", would premiere on radio on 1 October and would be officially released on 12 November, a week prior to the release of the album. The album's track listing was revealed on 28 September 2012 when it was posted on Amazon. An exclusive version of the album sold at HMV came with a free CD single of "DNA".

== Promotion ==
Little Mix began their first overseas promotional campaign for the album on 28 October 2012 in Sydney. The group appeared on The X Factor (Australia), giving a live performance of their single "Wings", which had already been released in Philippines. The following morning, the group appeared on Sunrise. Their Australian promotional tour lasted a week and destinations included Sydney and Melbourne. In February 2013, the group conducted a social network campaign called "Mixers Magnets", in which fans worldwide took part in games set by the girls; points were awarded to fan's countries, with the girls performing in the Top 3. The campaign was won by Italy, France and the USA. The girls made their subsequent performances in France and Italy for the Album's April release.

Little Mix performed "Wings" for the first time at the T4 on the Beach concert on 1 July. They also performed on Friday Download on 13 July, and on the second episode of the second series of Red or Black?, which aired on 25 August. On 18 July, the group performed a live acoustic session of "Wings" on In:Demand. They also performed at G-A-Y Heaven on 18 August, which was celebrating their first birthday as a group. Little Mix released an acoustic version of "Wings" in late August.

On 3 September, after they reached number one with "Wings", they performed on the relaunch show of Daybreak. On 30 October and 31 October, the quartet performed on Australian The X Factor and Sunrise respectively. The group performed "Wings" and "DNA" live on BBC Radio 1's Teen Awards 2012. On 24 October 2012, the group performed an a cappella version of "DNA" during a live UStream video. On 16 November 2012, for Children in Need, Little Mix performed the song 'Change Your Life'. Little Mix made an appearance on BBC Breakfast to promote their album on 21 November. As part of the promotion, Little Mix performed an acoustic version of DNA on BBC Radio 1 Live Lounge, as well as on ITV show Loose Women on 23 November 2012. To further promote the album, Little Mix embarked on their first headlining tour, entitled the DNA Tour, during January and February 2013.

== Singles ==
On 30 May 2012, Little Mix confirmed the lead single and its title via Twitcam. For the single, "Wings", Little Mix worked with TMS, who co-produced the albums of MOBO-winning artists Emeli Sandé and Tinchy Stryder. "Wings" was released by Syco records on 26 August 2012 in the UK and Ireland. It was later released in Australia and New Zealand on 5 October 2012. The song peaked at number one in the United Kingdom and Ireland, while reaching number 3 in Australia and 15 in New Zealand. The single also charted in Hungary, Czech Republic, Slovak Republic, Belgium, USA and Canada. Upon the first week of release, the single sold 107,000 copies. Since then, "Wings" has also been certified Gold in Australia and New Zealand.

The song "DNA", was selected as the second single from the album. The song was co-written and produced by TMS. The single was made available for digital download on iTunes on 11 November 2012. The song shares the same name as the album and during an interview, Jesy said that the song showed "a completely different side to Little Mix". "Change Your Life" was released as the third single on 3 February 2013. "How Ya Doin'?" was chosen as the fourth and final single from the album. The single version features singer/rapper, Missy Elliott and premiered on UK radio station Capital FM on 27 March 2013. The single was originally scheduled for a digital release on 5 May 2013, but instead was released on 17 April 2013.

== Critical reception ==
Professional ratings
Aggregate scores
Source	Rating
Metacritic	61/100
Review scores
Source	Rating
AllMusic	3.5/5 stars
The Guardian	3/5 stars
Digital Spy	4/5 stars
Time Out London	4/5 stars
BBC Music	(positive)
Metro	3/5

Upon its release, DNA received positive reviews from music critics. Al Fox from BBC Music was positive stating, "With placid, feline production, tight harmonies and breezy beats, much of DNA ambles along the well-trodden path of the temperate demi-ballad. But it's the ventures away from this that prove Little Mix function far better either side of mid-tempo." Matt Collar of AllMusic gave the album three and a half stars out of 5 saying, "The 2011 winners of Britain's The X Factor TV show, four-piece girl group Little Mix deliver a slick, high-energy mix of dance-oriented pop music with their debut full-length album, 2012's DNA...Little Mix make good on their promise of updating the '90s girl group sound of En Vogue and TLC." Rebecca Nicholson from The Guardian commented, "Their debut album arrives a year after the fact, and establishes their identity nicely, which is to say that they're being positioned as a sort of updated Girls Aloud with enormous drums and plenty of very "now" early-90s R&B references...When off-kilter beats collide with impeccable harmonies and pleasingly daft lyrics (literally, in the case of Madhouse, with its "Men in white coats, don't take me back there" line), it sounds like pop as it should be...", awarding the album three out of five stars.

== Commercial performance ==
In the United Kingdom, as part of Amazon's Black Friday Deals Week, more than 500 customised versions of the album were sold out in just 13 seconds of release online. This surpassed a previous record set by One Direction's debut album Up All Night (2011), which was part of the same promotion the previous year. Customised versions of Up All Night sold out in just under one minute, nearly three times slower than that of Little Mix. In Ireland, the album entered the chart at number three, behind Rihanna's Unapologetic and One Direction's Take Me Home. In the UK, it also placed in the same position behind the same two albums. By the end of the year, the album sold 234,000 copies, placing it 39th on the Top 40 biggest selling albums of the year. On 19 July 2013, DNA was officially certified Platinum by the British Phonographic Industry. The album spent a total of 36 weeks on the UK charts and has sold 450,000 copies in the UK as of 2019.

After its Europe-wide release, the album placed in the top 5 in Italy and Norway, in the top 10 in Czech Republic and Sweden, in the top 20 in Denmark and Spain, in the top 30 in France and Portugal, and in the top 50 in Finland, Belgium and the Netherlands. It was released in United States and Canada on 28 May. DNA has peaked in the top 10 of eight countries worldwide, including the UK, Australia and Italy.

In the US, DNA entered the Billboard 200 album chart at number four after selling over 50,000 copies, behind the albums of Daft Punk (Random Access Memories), Alice in Chains (The Devil Put Dinosaurs Here) and John Fogerty (Wrote a Song for Everyone). DNA was the highest charting debut-week entry album by a British girl group in the US; a record previously held by the Spice Girls' debut album Spice (1997) which debuted at number six, but which later went on to number one. On digital sales alone, DNA was second in the charts. As of December 2013, the album has sold over 121,000 copies in the US. To date, the album has sold over 2 million copies worldwide.

== Track listing ==
DNA – Standard edition
No.	Title	Writer(s)	Producer(s)	Length
1.	"Wings"	Thomas Barnes; Peter Kelleher; Ben Kohn; Iain James; Perrie Edwards; Jesy Nelson; Leigh-Anne Pinnock; Jade Thirlwall; Erika Nuri; Michelle Lewis; Mischke; Heidi Rojas	TMS	3:40
2.	"DNA"	Barnes; Kelleher; Kohn; James; Edwards; Nelson; Pinnock; Thirlwall	TMS	3:56
3.	"Change Your Life"	Richard "Biff" Stannard; Tim Powell; Ash Howes; Edwards; Nelson; Pinnock; Thirlwall	Stannard; Powell; Howes	3:22
4.	"Always Be Together"	Ester Dean; Dapo Torimiro	Dean; DAPO	4:27
5.	"Stereo Soldier"	James; Barnes; Kelleher; Kohn	TMS	3:22
6.	"Pretend It's OK"	Brian Higgins; Luke Fitton; Miranda Cooper; Edwards; Nelson; Pinnock; Thirlwall	Higgins; Xenomania	3:45
7.	"Turn Your Face"	Steve Mac; Priscilla Renea	Mac	3:41
8.	"We Are Who We Are"	Mac; Wayne Hector; Ina Wroldsen	Mac	3:04
9.	"How Ya Doin'?"	Darren Lewis; Iylola Babalola; Edwards; Nelson; Pinnock; Thirlwall; James Carter; Shaznay Lewis; Glenn Skinner; Ben Volpeliere-Pierrot; Nicholas Thorp; Julian Brookhouse; Miguel Drummond	Future Cut	3:13
10.	"Red Planet" (featuring T-Boz)	Jon Levine; Autumn Rowe; Tionne "T-Boz" Watkins	Levine	3:46
11.	"Going Nowhere"	Fred Ball; James; Nicola Roberts; Edwards; Nelson; Pinnock; Thirlwall	Ball	3:45
12.	"Madhouse"	James; Rufio Sandilands; Rocky Morris; Edwards; Nelson; Pinnock; Thirlwall	Pegasus	3:49
Total length:				43:50

DNA – Overseas special digital edition (bonus track)
No.	Title	Writer(s)	Length
13.	"We Are Young^{[c]}" (Acoustic)	Ruess; Dost; Antonoff; Bhasker	5:12
Total length:			49:02

DNA – 2013 repress edition (bonus track)
No.	Title	Writer(s)	Producer(s)	Length
9.	"How Ya Doin'?" (featuring Missy Elliott)	Lewis; Babalola; Lewis; Little Mix; Melissa Elliott	Future Cut	3:33

DNA: The Deluxe Edition – Disc 1 (CD)
No.	Title	Writer(s)	Producer(s)	Length
13.	"Love Drunk"	Paul Meehan; Tim Woodcock; Alessandro Benassi; Pinnock	Meehan; Matt Furmidge	3:35
14.	"Make You Believe"	Barnes; Kelleher; Kohn; James; Philippe Marc Anquetill	TMS	3:41
15.	"Case Closed"	Robbie Lamond; Cathy Dennis; Lewis; Babalola; Edwards; Nelson; Pinnock; Thirlwall	Future Cut; Lamond	3:12
16.	"DNA^{[c]}" (Unplugged)	Barnes; Kelleher; Kohn; James; Edwards; Nelson; Pinnock; Thirlwall		4:15
Total length:				58:33

DNA: The Deluxe Edition – 2013 iTunes Store deluxe edition (bonus track)
No.	Title	Writer(s)	Producer(s)	Length
17.	"How Ya Doin'?" (featuring Missy Elliott)	Lewis; Babalola; Lewis; Little Mix; Melissa Elliott	Future Cut	3:33

DNA: The Deluxe Edition – Italian and French special edition (bonus tracks)
No.	Title	Writer(s)	Producer(s)	Length
17.	"Wings" (Acoustic)	Barnes; Kelleher; Kohn; James; Little Mix	TMS	3:39
18.	"Wings" (The Alias Club Mix)	Barnes; Kelleher; Kohn; James; Little Mix	Alias	6:04
19.	"DNA" (Kat Krazy Club Mix)	Barnes; Kelleher; Kohn; James; Little Mix	Kat Krazy	6:17
20.	"Change Your Life" (The Bimbo Jones Radio Edit)	Stannard; Powell; Howes; Little Mix	Bimbo Jones	3:33

DNA: The Deluxe Edition – International special edition (bonus tracks)
No.	Title	Writer(s)	Producer(s)	Length
17.	"Wings" (Acoustic)	Barnes; Kelleher; Kohn; James; Little Mix	TMS	3:39
18.	"We Are Young" (Acoustic)	Ruess; Dost; Antonoff; Bhasker		5:12
19.	"Wings" (The Alias Club Mix)	Barnes; Kelleher; Kohn; James; Little Mix	Alias	4:59
20.	"Change Your Life" (The Bimbo Jones Radio Edit)	Stannard; Powell; Howes; Little Mix	Bimbo Jones	2:48

DNA – 2020 digital expanded edition (bonus tracks)
No.	Title	Writer(s)	Producer(s)	Length
9.	"How Ya Doin'?" (featuring Missy Elliott)	Lewis; Babalola; Lewis; Little Mix; Elliott	Future Cut	3:33
21.	"Cannonball"	Damien Rice	Mac Ash Howes Richard "Biff" Stannard	3:25
22.	"How Ya Doin'?"	Lewis; Babalola; Lewis; Little Mix	Future Cut	3:13
Total length:				83:00

DNA: The Deluxe Edition – Disc 2 (DVD)
No.	Title	Director(s)	Length
1.	"Wings" (Music video)	Max & Dania	3:39
2.	"Wings" (Acoustic video)	Dominic O'Riordan; Warren Smith	3:50
3.	"We Are Young" (Acoustic video)	O'Riordan; Smith	5:13
4.	"Creating Our DNA"	O'Riordan; Smith	15:42

DNA: The Deluxe Edition – Disc 2 (iTunes Store edition)
No.	Title	Length
5.	"Mastermind" (Documentary video)	4:51

DNA: The Deluxe Edition – HMV Limited edition (bonus disc)
No.	Title	Writer(s)	Producer(s)	Length
1.	"DNA"	Little Mix; TMS; James	TMS	3:56
2.	"DNA" (Kat Krazy Radio Edit)	Little Mix; TMS; James	TMS	3:57

DNA – Remixes EP
No.	Title	Writer(s)	Producer(s)	Length
1.	"Wings" (Sunship Extended Mix)	Barnes; Kelleher; Kohn; James; Little Mix	Sunship	4:51
2.	"Wings" (Korean Version)	Barnes; Kelleher; Kohn; James; Little Mix	TMS	3:40
3.	"Wings" (Japanese Version)	Barnes; Kelleher; Kohn; James; Little Mix; Junji Ishiwatari	TMS	3:41
4.	"DNA" (Kat Krazy Club Mix)	Barnes; Kelleher; Kohn; James; Little Mix	Kat Krazy	5:34
5.	"DNA" (Eyes Remix)	Barnes; Kelleher; Kohn; James; Little Mix	Eyes	4:45
6.	"Change Your Life" (Sonny J Mason Radio Edit)	Stannard; Powell; Howes; Little Mix	Sonny J Mason	4:21
Total length:				26:55

Notes

- ^{^[a]} – signifies an additional vocal producer
- ^{^[b]} – signifies a vocal producer
- ^{^[c]} – "We Are Young" (Acoustic) replaces the unplugged version of "DNA" as track 16 on the deluxe edition in certain regions.

== Personnel ==
Adapted from AllMusic.

- Philippe Marc Anquetil – mixing, vocal engineer, vocal producer
- Dan Aslet – vocal engineer
- Daniel Aslet – vocal engineer
- Iyiola Babalola – drums
- Fred Ball – keyboards, percussion, producer
- Thomas Barnes – drums
- Simon Clarke – arranger, alto saxophone, baritone saxophone
- Ben Collier – vocal engineer
- Miranda Cooper – programming
- Tom Coyne – mastering
- DAPO – mixing
- Ester Dean – producer, vocal producer
- Perrie Edwards – vocals
- Ben Epstein – bass, guitars, producer
- Brett Farkas – guitars
- Luke Fitton – guitars, programming
- Future Cut – engineer, producer
- Paul Gendler – guitars
- Serban Ghenea – mixing
- Matt Gray – programming
- Michael Hamilton – bass
- John Hanes – engineer
- Wayne Hector – composer
- Brian Higgins – producer, programming
- Ash Howes – producer
- Iain James – vocal arrangement, vocal producer, background vocals
- Josh Jenkin – programming
- Peter Kelleher – keyboards, synthesizer
- The Kick Horns – brass
- Ben Kohn – guitar, keyboards
- Tyson Kuteyi – engineer
- Chris Laws – drums, mixing
- Jon Levine – engineer, piano, producer
- Darren Lewis – guitars, instrumentation, keyboards
- Dave Liddell – trombone
- Steve Mac – keyboards, piano arrangement, producer, string arrangements, synthesizer
- MNEK – programming
- Rocky Morris – drums, keyboards, programming
- Jesy Nelson – vocals
- Pegasus – producer
- Leigh-Anne Pinnock – vocals
- Tim Powell – producer
- Dann Pursey – engineer
- Ryan Quigley – trumpet
- Jacob Quistgaard – guitars
- Carmen Reece – vocal arrangement, background vocals
- James F. Reynolds – mixing, vocal producer
- Daniel Rivera – assistant engineer
- Andy Robinson – programming
- Tim Sanders – arranger, tenor saxophone
- Rufio Sandilands – drums, keyboards, programming
- Toby Scott – engineer, programming
- Phil Seaford – assistant engineer
- Slick Rick – featured artist
- Richard "Biff" Stannard – producer
- Shea Stedford – assistant engineer
- T-boz – Featured Artist
- Phil Tan – mixing
- Ben Taylor – engineer, programming
- Jade Thirlwall – vocals
- TMS – arranger, producer
- Dapo Torimiro – engineer, instrumentation, producer
- Jeremy Wheatley – mixing
- Darren Wiles – trumpet
- Xenomania – producer

== Charts ==
=== Weekly charts ===
Weekly chart performance for DNA
Chart (2012–13)	Peak position
Australian Albums (ARIA)	10
Belgian Albums (Ultratop Flanders)	48
Belgian Albums (Ultratop Wallonia)	87
Canadian Albums (Billboard)	4
Croatian International Albums (HDU)	21
Czech Albums (ČNS IFPI)	2
Danish Albums (Hitlisten)	13
Dutch Albums (Album Top 100)	49
Finnish Albums (Suomen virallinen lista)	50
French Albums (SNEP)	24
Irish Albums (IRMA)	3
Italian Albums (FIMI)	5
Japanese Albums (Oricon)	20
Mexican Albums (Top 100 Mexico)	28
New Zealand Albums (RMNZ)	14
Norwegian Albums (VG-lista)	5
Portuguese Albums (AFP)	30
Scottish Albums (Official Charts)	5
Spanish Albums (Promusicae)	17
Swedish Albums (Sverigetopplistan)	8
Swiss Albums (Schweizer Hitparade)	86
UK Albums (Official Charts)	3
US Billboard 200	4

=== Year-end charts ===
Year-end chart performance for DNA
Chart (2012)	Position
UK Albums (OCC)	39
Chart (2013)	Position
UK Albums (OCC)	93

== Certifications ==
Certifications for DNA
Region	Certification	Certified units/sales
Australia (ARIA)	Gold	35,000^{^}
Ireland (IRMA)	Gold	7,500^{^}
New Zealand (RMNZ)	Gold	7,500^{^}
United Kingdom (BPI)	Platinum	475,000
United States	—	121,000
^{^} Shipments figures based on certification alone.^{‡} Sales+streaming figures based on certification alone.

== Release history ==
Region	Date	Format(s)	Label(s)
Ireland	16 November 2012	CD; digital download	Syco Music
United Kingdom	19 November 2012	CD; digital download	Syco Music
Australia	23 November 2012	CD; digital download	Sony Music Australia
New Zealand	23 November 2012	CD; digital download	Sony Music Australia
Austria	19 April 2013	CD; digital download	Syco Music
Belgium	19 April 2013	CD; digital download	Syco Music
Germany	19 April 2013	CD; digital download	Syco Music
Netherlands	19 April 2013	CD; digital download	Syco Music
Bulgaria	22 April 2013	CD; digital download	Syco Music
Czech Republic	22 April 2013	CD; digital download	Syco Music
France	22 April 2013	CD; digital download	Syco Music
Greece	22 April 2013	CD; digital download	Syco Music
Hong Kong	22 April 2013	CD; digital download	Syco Music
India	22 April 2013	CD; digital download	Syco Music
Indonesia	22 April 2013	CD; digital download	Syco Music
Malaysia	22 April 2013	CD; digital download	Syco Music
Spain	22 April 2013	CD; digital download	Sony Music Spain
Mexico	23 April 2013	CD; digital download	Syco Music
Italy	23 April 2013	CD; digital download	Syco Music
Poland	23 April 2013	CD; digital download	Sony Music Polska
Philippines	27 April 2013	CD; digital download	Sony Music Philippines
Taiwan	14 May 2013	CD; digital download	Sony Music Taiwan
Canada	28 May 2013	CD; digital download	Columbia Records
United States	28 May 2013	CD; digital download	Columbia Records
Japan	21 August 2013	CD; digital download	Sony Music Japan
