= Jesy Nelson =

British singer (born 1991)

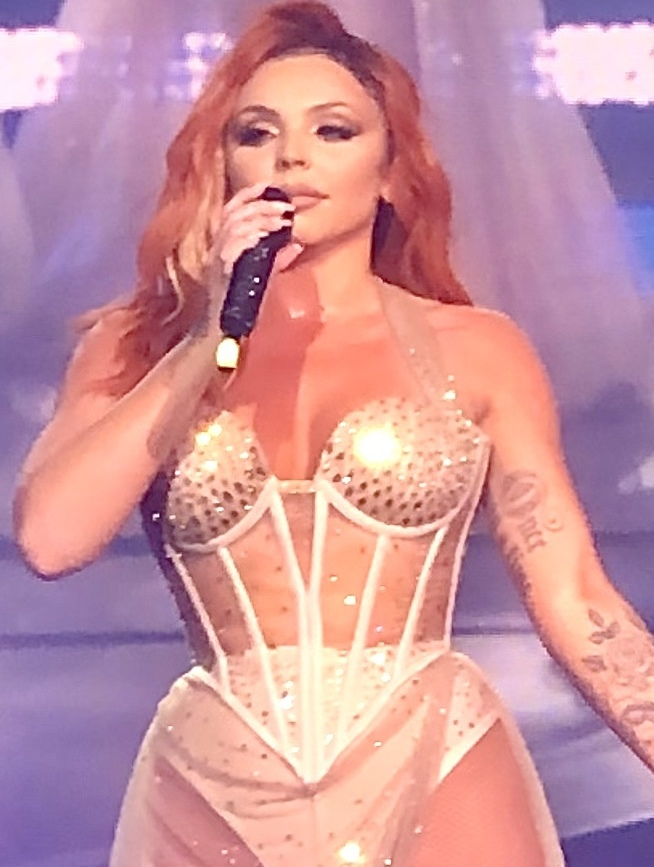
- Nelson in 2019
- Born: Jessica Louise Nelson; 14 June 1991 (age 35); Romford, London, England
- Occupation: Singer
- Years active: 2011–present
- Partner: Zion Foster (2022–2026)
- Children: 2
- Musical career
- Genres: Pop; dance-pop; R&B
- Works: Solo discography; Little Mix discography
- Labels: Polydor; Republic
- Formerly of: Little Mix

Jessica Louise Nelson (born 14 June 1991) is an English singer. She rose to prominence as a member of the girl group Little Mix, who were formed during the eighth series of The X Factor in 2011. As part of Little Mix, Nelson achieved seventeen top-ten singles and five number-one singles on the UK Singles Chart.

In 2019, Nelson released a documentary titled Jesy Nelson: Odd One Out, which focused on her struggles with body image, mental health and online bullying. It won the Factual Entertainment Award at the 25th National Television Awards and the Visionary Honour Award for Documentary of the Year. Nelson's private life, departure from Little Mix in 2020, and solo career have been the subject of media scrutiny in the UK. In 2020, she was hospitalised for attempting to commit suicide. In October 2021, she released her debut single titled "Boyz", featuring rapper Nicki Minaj. It debuted at number four on the UK Singles Chart. In April 2023, she released her follow-up single, "Bad Thing".

Nelson became an advocate for spinal muscular atrophy (SMA) after her twin daughters had been diagnosed with the condition. In 2025, she began campaigns for the inclusion of SMA in the UK newborn screening programme to enable earlier diagnosis and treatment. In 2026, she announced she would be taking a break from the music industry due to mental health issues and the birth of her children.

== Early life ==
Jessica Louise Nelson was born on 14 June 1991 in Romford, east London, to John Nelson, a businessman, and Janis Nelson, a police community support officer. Her parents separated when she was five. She is the second youngest of four children with an older sister Jade, an older brother Jonathan and a younger brother Joseph.

Nelson attended Jo Richardson Community School and Abbs Cross Academy and Arts College in Hornchurch, London. She also attended the Sylvia Young and Yvonne Rhodes Theatre Schools. Prior to auditioning for The X Factor, Nelson worked as a barmaid in Dagenham. In 2020, Nelson said that, as a child, she had non-speaking roles as an extra in About a Boy (2002) and Harry Potter and the Goblet of Fire (2005).

== Career ==
=== 2011–2020: Career beginnings and Little Mix ===
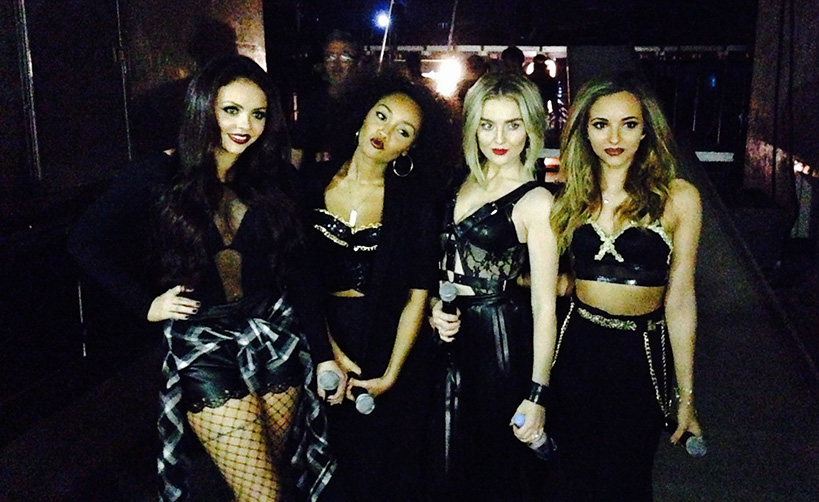
Nelson (far left) with Little Mix in 2014

Her first audition was "Bust Your Windows" by Jazmine Sullivan, and successfully auditioned as a soloist for the eighth series of the UK version of The X Factor in front of judges Louis Walsh, Gary Barlow, Tulisa Contostavlos and Kelly Rowland, but failed the first challenge of the "bootcamp" section to progress through to the Girls category (solo females aged 16–24). Nelson and Perrie Edwards were placed in a group called "Faux Pas" while Jade Thirlwall and Leigh-Anne Pinnock were to be put in a group named "Orion". Both groups, however, failed to progress. A later decision by the judges recalled two members from each group to form the four-piece group Rhythmix, sending them through to the "judges' houses" section. They eventually reached the live shows and were mentored by Tulisa Contostavlos. On 28 October 2011, it was announced that the band's new name would be Little Mix. On 11 December 2011, Little Mix were announced as the winners, making them the first band ever to win the British version of the show.

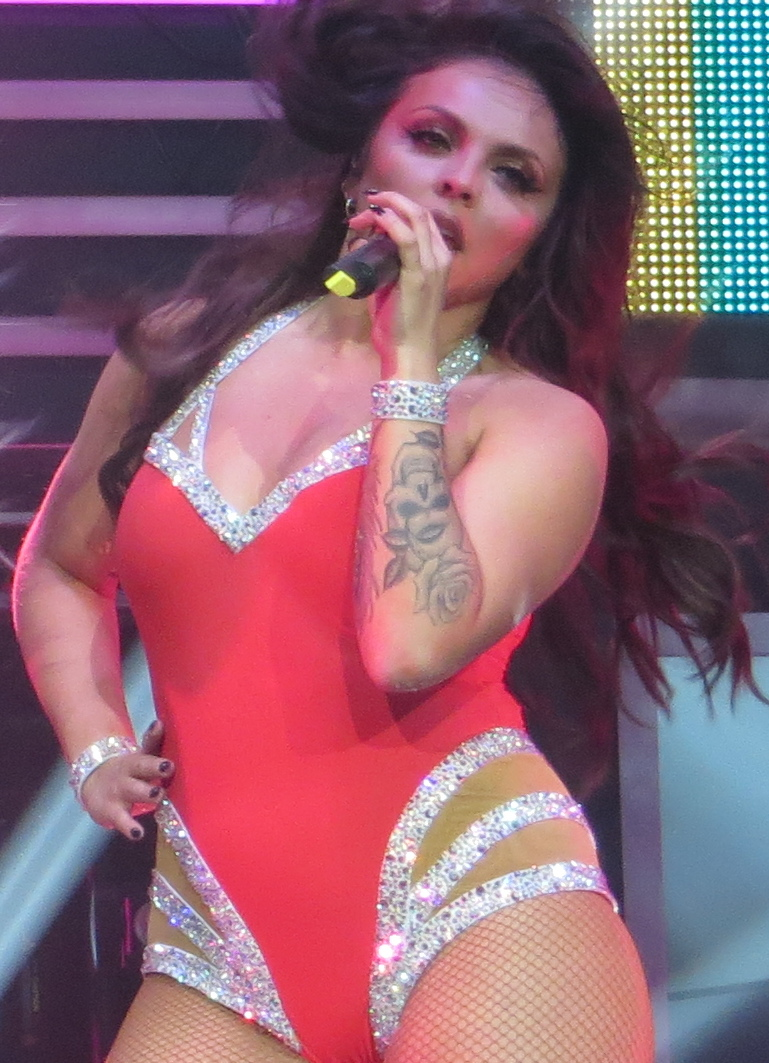
Nelson performing during Little Mix's The Get Weird Tour in 2016

After winning the show, Little Mix signed a record deal with Syco Music, owned by Simon Cowell. Since joining Little Mix, Nelson has faced cyber-bullying and struggled to cope during her time on The X Factor. Nelson released six albums with the group; DNA (2012), Salute (2013), Get Weird (2015), Glory Days (2016), LM5 (2018) and Confetti (2020) The last of which was released a month before she left the group.

Nelson released her documentary on BBC Three in 2019, titled Jesy Nelson: Odd One Out. The documentary was based on her experiences with body image and online bullying. It was BBC Three's top factual title since the channel moved online and on BBC One it was watched by 3.3 million viewers. The documentary won the Factual Entertainment Award at the 25th National Television Awards.

In December 2020, she announced her departure from the group due to prolonged issues with her mental health. She said: "I find the constant pressure of being in a girl group and living up to expectations very hard."

=== 2021–2026: Solo projects and withdrawal from the music industry ===
In May 2021, Nelson announced that she had signed a record deal with Polydor Records and that she would be releasing solo music later in the year. On 8 October 2021, she released her debut solo single, "Boyz", which featured Trinidadian rapper Nicki Minaj. The single, which interpolates the song "Bad Boy for Life" by Diddy who made a cameo appearance in a music video for "Boyz", was met with moderate reception and debuted at number four on the UK singles chart. In June 2022, Nelson revealed that her debut album was almost finished, but a month later it was announced that she had split from Polydor amid "creative differences", and the record remains unreleased.

In December 2022, it was reported that Nelson had filmed a music video for a follow-up single titled "Cried Out", which was later shelved in favour of her second official solo single, "Bad Thing", released independently on 14 April 2023. Upon its release, Nelson received praise from the charity Women's Aid due to the song's themes of domestic abuse. The single peaked at number 15 on the UK Singles Downloads Chart. Nelson next planned to release "Cried Out" as her third single, but in July 2023, it was reported that the single was scrapped.

Nelson collaborated with Zion Foster on the single "Mine", which was released on 2 August 2024.

On 13 February 2026, Nelson released her docuseries Jesy Nelson: Life After Little Mix on Amazon Prime Video. In the docuseries, Nelson announced that she would be stepping away from the music industry due to mental health reasons and the birth of her children.

== Personal life ==
Nelson has 15 tattoos, including a quote on her upper right arm: "Music is the strongest form of magic".

=== Health and online bullying ===
Nelson has said that being bullied at school may have contributed to her suffering from stress-induced alopecia as a teenager. In her BBC documentary Odd One Out, Nelson was vocal about her struggle with body image. She said she would starve herself before TV performances or video shoots, then later binge eat. She said that abuse from online trolls on Twitter drove her to attempt suicide in 2014, stating: "I felt that I physically couldn't tolerate the pain any more."

In 2019, Nelson spoke about her experiences with body image and the impact of online bullying on her life and mental health. Before Little Mix's 2020 studio album Confetti was released, Nelson took some time out of the group's promotion schedule, citing a private medical matter. On 14 December 2020, she announced she was leaving the group due to the impact on her mental health. In a statement, she said: "I find the constant pressure of being in a girl group and living up to expectations very hard."

After the COVID-19 pandemic, Little Mix began work on the "Holiday" music video. Nelson had gained weight and did not feel fit for filming, deciding to go on a drastic diet without getting results. After filming the "Sweet Melody" music video, she was hospitalised for attempting suicide for the second time. In November 2020, Little Mix's publicist stated that Nelson would take an extended break from the pop group for "private medical reasons". Her lawyer told the other members that she had to leave the group. On 14 December 2020, Nelson announced her departure from Little Mix due to struggles with her mental health. She said that some backstage people associated with Little Mix were glad to see her go.

In August 2021, Nelson told The Guardian that since her first appearance on The X Factor with Little Mix she had been trolled about her physical appearance on social media. Although the group supported Nelson's frailties, she said that The X Factor should pair a therapist or psychologist with the coaches. Nelson underwent therapy, where she was told she had an eating disorder.

=== Relationships and children ===
Nelson began dating Diversity dancer Jordan Banjo in 2012; they separated the following year. In 2014, she entered a relationship with Rixton lead singer, Jake Roche. They became engaged on 19 July 2015, but ended their relationship in November 2016. Nelson briefly dated Chris Clark in 2017, followed by a 16-month relationship with musician Harry James that concluded in November 2018. In January 2019, she began dating Love Island contestant Chris Hughes; they separated in April 2020.

Nelson entered a relationship with rapper Zion Foster in November 2022. In January 2025, Nelson and Foster announced that they were expecting twins. On 18 May 2025, she revealed via Instagram that their twin daughters had been born prematurely at 31 weeks and five days, following a high-risk pregnancy complicated by twin-to-twin transfusion syndrome. After several weeks in neonatal care, Nelson stated in June 2025 that the twins had been discharged and were home. In September 2025, she announced that she and Foster had become engaged. In January 2026, she shared that their twins had been diagnosed with spinal muscular atrophy (SMA) type 1, and that they were unlikely to develop the ability to walk. Later that month after announcing their twins' diagnosis, Nelson and Foster broke up as the stress and trauma of the diagnosis took a toll on their relationship, and they decided to focus on co-parenting their twins.

=== Accusations of cultural appropriation ===
In June 2018, Nelson posted an image of herself on Instagram wearing her hair in dreadlocks. The photo was later deleted after she was criticised over accusations of cultural appropriation. In May 2021, Nelson was accused of "blackfishing" (a form of cultural appropriation). In 2021, after the release of "Boyz", Nelson faced criticism online for her appearance in the music video, with comments on her accent and darkened skin. This led to further accusations of blackfishing.

== Selected works ==
- (with Perrie Edwards, Leigh-Anne Pinnock and Jade Thirlwall) Little Mix: ready to fly (London, 2012) ISBN 978-0007488162
- (with Perrie Edwards, Leigh-Anne Pinnock and Jade Thirlwall) Our World (London, 2016) ISBN 978-1405927437

== Discography ==
=== As lead artist ===
List of singles as lead artist, showing year released, with selected chart positions and album name
Title	Year	Peak chart positions					Album
Title	Year	UK	IRE	NZ Hot	US Bub.	WW	Album
"Boyz" (featuring Nicki Minaj)	2021	4	16	4	13	86	Non-album singles
"Bad Thing"	2023	— (Note: "Bad Thing" did not enter the UK Top 100 but instead peaked at number 15 on the UK Singles Downloads chart.)	—	—	—	—	Non-album singles
"—" denotes releases that did not chart or were not released in that region.

=== Promotional singles ===
List of singles as lead artist, showing year released, with selected chart positions and album name
Title	Year	Peak chart positions	Album
Title	Year	UK Digital	Album
"Mine" (with Zion Foster)	2024	29	Non-album single

=== Songwriting credits ===
List of songwriting credits, with year released and album shown
Year	Artist	Featured artist	Album	Song	Notes
2012	Little Mix	—N/a	DNA	"Wings"	Co-writer
2012	Little Mix	—N/a	DNA	"DNA"	Co-writer
2012	Little Mix	—N/a	DNA	"Change Your Life"	Co-writer
2012	Little Mix	—N/a	DNA	"How Ya Doin'?"	Co-writer
2013	Little Mix	—N/a	Salute	"Salute"	Co-writer
2013	Little Mix	—N/a	Salute	"Move"	Co-writer
2013	Little Mix	—N/a	Salute	"Little Me"	Co-writer
2015	Little Mix	—N/a			Co-writer
2015	Little Mix	—N/a	Get Weird	"Grown"	Co-writer
2015	Little Mix	—N/a	Get Weird	"OMG"	Co-writer
2015	Little Mix	—N/a	Get Weird	"I Love You"	Co-writer
2015	Little Mix	—N/a	Get Weird	"Lightning"	Co-writer
2015	Little Mix	—N/a	Get Weird	"I Won't"	Co-writer
2015	Little Mix	—N/a	Get Weird	"Clued Up"	Co-writer
2015	Britney Spears and Iggy Azalea	—N/a	Non-album single	"Pretty Girls"	Co-writer
2016	Little Mix	—N/a	Glory Days	"Shout Out to My Ex"	Co-writer
2016	Little Mix	—N/a	Glory Days	"Freak"	Co-writer
2016	Little Mix	—N/a	Glory Days	"Down & Dirty"	Co-writer
2016	Little Mix	—N/a	Glory Days	"Private Show"	Co-writer
2018	Little Mix	Sharaya J	LM5	"Strip"	Co-writer
2018	Little Mix	—N/a	LM5	"Love a Girl Right"	Co-writer
2021	Herself	Nicki Minaj	Non-album singles	"Boyz"	Co-writer
2023	Herself	—N/a	Non-album singles	"Bad Thing"	Co-writer
2024	Zion Foster and Herself	—N/a	Non-album singles	"Mine"	Co-writer

== Filmography ==
Listing of acting roles
Year	Title	Role	Notes	Ref.
2002	About a Boy	Extra	Uncredited	
2005	Harry Potter and the Goblet of Fire	Extra	Uncredited	

Documentary

Listing of acting roles
Year	Title	Role	Notes	Ref.
2019	Jesy Nelson: Odd One Out	Herself	documentary	
2026	Jesy Nelson: Life After Little Mix	Herself	docu-series	
2026	Honouring Incredible Woman & Their Amazing Families	Herself	Host; docu-video	
2026	Jesy Nelson: Life Changing	Herself	documentary	

== Awards and nominations ==
Year	Award ceremony	Category	Nominee(s)/work(s)	Result	Ref.
2019	CelebMix Awards	Biggest Inspiration	Herself	Nominated	
2019	Metro UK Awards	Celeb of the Year	Herself	Won	
2019	I Talk Telly Awards	Best Documentary	Odd One Out	Won	
2019	OnSide Awards	Gold award	Odd One Out	Won	
2020	National Television Awards	Factual Entertainment	Odd One Out	Won	
2020	Visionary Honours Awards	Documentary of the Year	Odd One Out	Won	
2020	PLT Awards	Inspirational Influencer of the Year	Herself	Won	
2020	CelebMix Awards	Biggest Inspiration	Herself	Nominated	
