= The Art of Loving Live =

2026 concert tour by Olivia Dean

- Tour by Olivia Dean
- Promotional poster for European concerts
- Location: Europe; North America; Oceania; Asia
- Associated album: The Art of Loving
- Start date: 22 April 2026
- End date: 11 February 2027
- Legs: 4
- No. of shows: 55
- Supporting acts: Alice Phoebe Lou; Kokoroko; Jalen Ngonda; Sasha Keable; Baby Rose; Kaiit
- Website: www.oliviadeano.com

Olivia Dean concert chronology
- Across the Atlantic Tour (2025); The Art of Loving Live (2026)

The Art of Loving Live is the second concert tour by English neo soul singer-songwriter Olivia Dean, in support of her second studio album, The Art of Loving (2025). It commenced on 23 April 2026, in Glasgow, Scotland, and will conclude on 11 February 2027, in Yokohama, Japan, spanning 55 shows across various arenas and festivals in Europe, North America, Oceania and Asia. The tour marked Dean's biggest concert tour of her career so far. Alice Phoebe Lou, Kokoroko, Jalen Ngonda, Sasha Keable, Baby Rose and Kaiit served as supporting acts.

== Announcements ==
On 22 August 2025, Dean announced that she would embark on her second concert tour, the Art of Loving Live, spanning fifteen shows across Europe in her biggest tour thus far and her first ever all-arena tour. Pre-sales started on 26 August, while general sales began on 29 August 2025.

The shows sold out immediately and, due to high demand, Dean added five additional dates for the tour including a four-night residency at The O2 Arena, an additional date for Amsterdam, a second leg of the tour in Oceania, another two dates for her O2 residency in London, dates in the United States in Canada (her first time headlining arenas in the United States and Canada), and then added three additional shows at Madison Square Garden.

== Philanthropy ==
Dean announced that she would be partnering with the nonprofit organization PLUS1 to donate $1 from each ticket to strengthen and support communities in Jamaica.

== Controversy over ticket resale ==
in November 2025, Dean criticized Ticketmaster and other primary ticket outlets such as Live Nation, AXS, and Anschutz Entertainment Group for allowing tickets to the tour to be re-sold by scalpers at high markups. Dean referred to Ticketmaster as providing a "disgusting service" and said that the secondary ticketing market was "exploitative and unregulated". As a result of the controversy, Ticketmaster and AXS capped resale ticket prices for Dean's tour and provided refunds for fans that paid above face value; Dean said that she was excited to see "real people" at her shows.

== Set list ==
Dean performing in Sydney, Australia in October 2026.

This set list was taken from the show in Glasgow on 22 April 2026. It does not represent all shows throughout the tour.

1. "The Art of Loving (Intro)"
2. "Nice to Each Other"
3. "Lady Lady"
4. "So Easy (To Fall in Love)"
5. "Close Up"
6. "Let Alone the One You Love"
7. "Messy"
8. "UFO"
9. "Touching Toes"
10. "I've Seen It"
11. "Carmen"
12. "Echo"
13. "Time"
14. "Loud"
15. "A Couple Minutes"
16. "The Hardest Part"
17. "Baby Steps"
18. "Ladies Room"
19. "Move On Up" (Curtis Mayfield cover)
20. "OK Love You Bye"
21. "It Isn't Perfect But It Might Be"
22. "Dive"
23. "Man I Need"

=== Notes ===
- During the shows in London on 1 and 2 May 2026, Sam Fender joined Dean onstage to perform "Rein Me In".

== Tour dates ==
List of 2026 concerts, showing date, city, country and venue
Date (2026)	City	Country	Venue	Opening acts
22 April	Glasgow	Scotland	OVO Hydro	Kokoroko
23 April	Glasgow	Scotland	OVO Hydro	Jalen Ngonda
25 April	Manchester	England	Co-op Live	Kokoroko
26 April	Manchester	England	Co-op Live	Jalen Ngonda
29 April	London	England	The O_{2} Arena	Kokoroko
30 April	London	England	The O_{2} Arena	Jalen Ngonda
1 May	London	England	The O_{2} Arena	Jalen Ngonda
2 May	London	England	The O_{2} Arena	Alice Phoebe Lou
8 May	Brussels	Belgium	Forest National	Alice Phoebe Lou
9 May	Amsterdam	Netherlands	Ziggo Dome	Alice Phoebe Lou
11 May (Note: The venue for the show on May 11, was upgraded from Mitsubishi Electric Halle due to high demand.)	Cologne	Germany	Lanxess Arena	Alice Phoebe Lou
12 May (Note: The venue for the show on 12 May, was upgraded from Velodrom due to high demand.)	Berlin	Germany	Uber Arena	Alice Phoebe Lou
14 May	Copenhagen	Denmark	Royal Arena	Jalen Ngonda
16 May	Fornebu (Note: Labeled as Oslo in promotional material.)	Norway	Unity Arena	Jalen Ngonda
17 May	Stockholm	Sweden	Avicii Arena	Jalen Ngonda
20 May (Note: The May 20 concert in Zurich at Hallenstadion was originally scheduled to take place at The Hall, but was rescheduled due to high demand.)	Zürich	Switzerland	Hallenstadion	Jalen Ngonda
22 May (Note: The May 22 concert in Milan at Fiera Milano Live was originally scheduled to take place at Carroponte, but was rescheduled due to high demand.)	Milan	Italy	Fiera Milano Live	Jalen Ngonda
24 May (Note: The May 24 concert in Sunderland is part of the BBC Radio 1's Big Weekend.)	Sunderland	England	Herrington Country Park	—N/a
30 May (Note: The May 30 concert in Warsaw is part of the Orange Warsaw Festival.)	Warsaw	Poland	Służewiec Racetrack	—N/a
11 June	London	England	The O_{2} Arena	Alice Phoebe Lou
12 June	London	England	The O_{2} Arena	Alice Phoebe Lou
14 June	Amsterdam	Netherlands	Ziggo Dome	Jalen Ngonda
17 June	Paris	France	Accor Arena	Alice Phoebe Lou
20 June (Note: The venue for the show on 20 June 2026, was upgraded from the Fairview Park following high demand.)	Dublin	Ireland	Marlay Park	Alice Phoebe Lou; Sasha Keable
21 June	Dublin	Ireland	Marlay Park	Alice Phoebe Lou; Sasha Keable
10 July	San Francisco	United States	Chase Center	Baby Rose
11 July	San Francisco	United States	Chase Center	Baby Rose
14 July	Los Angeles	United States	Crypto.com Arena	Baby Rose
15 July	Los Angeles	United States	Crypto.com Arena	Baby Rose
18 July	Paradise (Note: Labeled as Las Vegas in promotional material.)	United States	MGM Grand Garden Arena	Baby Rose
22 July	West Valley City (Note: Labeled as Salt Lake City in promotional material.)	United States	Maverik Center	Baby Rose
25 July	Denver	United States	Ball Arena	Baby Rose
26 July	Denver	United States	Ball Arena	Baby Rose
29 July	Minneapolis	United States	Target Center	Baby Rose
1 August (Note: Part of Lollapalooza.)	Chicago	United States	Grant Park	—N/a
4 August	Toronto	Canada	Scotiabank Arena	Baby Rose
5 August	Toronto	Canada	Scotiabank Arena	Baby Rose
7 August	Montreal	Canada	Bell Centre	Baby Rose
10 August	Boston	United States	TD Garden	Baby Rose
12 August	Baltimore	United States	CFG Bank Arena	Baby Rose
14 August	New York City	United States	Madison Square Garden	Baby Rose
15 August	New York City	United States	Madison Square Garden	Baby Rose
17 August	New York City	United States	Madison Square Garden	Baby Rose
18 August	New York City	United States	Madison Square Garden	Baby Rose
22 August	Atlanta	United States	State Farm Arena	Baby Rose
25 August	Houston	United States	Toyota Center	Baby Rose
28 August	Austin	United States	Moody Center	Baby Rose
29 August	Austin	United States	Moody Center	Baby Rose
5 October	Melbourne	Australia	Rod Laver Arena	Kaiit
6 October	Melbourne	Australia	Rod Laver Arena	Kaiit
9 October	Sydney	Australia	Afterpay Arena	Kaiit
10 October	Sydney	Australia	Afterpay Arena	Kaiit
13 October	Brisbane	Australia	Brisbane Entertainment Centre	Kaiit
17 October (Note: The venue for the show on 17 October was upgraded from Spark Arena due to high demand.)	Auckland	New Zealand	Western Springs Bowl	Kaiit

List of 2027 concerts, showing date, city, country and venue
Date (2027)	City	Country	Venue	Opening acts
11 February	Yokohama	Japan	K-Arena Yokohama	—N/a
