= List of songs which have spent the most weeks on the UK singles chart =

The following is a list of songs that have charted for 100 weeks or more in total on the UK singles chart top 100, according to the Official Charts Company (OCC). The chart here is as recorded by the OCC, i.e. usually a Top 50 from 1960 to 1978, Top 75 from then until 1982, and Top 100 from 1983 onwards. In the pre-digital age, records with re-recorded vocals (for example, live versions) and remixes released with substantially different catalogue numbers did not count towards the total and were seen as new hits (see "Blue Monday" as an example). In the digital age, if versions of a record are substantially the same tune, whether the release is remixed, live or re-recorded, they are combined under one chart entry, unless the record company has requested a version to be listed as a separate entry.

With over 508 weeks in the chart, "Mr Brightside" by the Killers has had more weeks in the Top 100 than any other single in over 70 years of chart data, and is also now in first place in the Top 75 long runners list (as previously used in The Guinness Book Of Hit Singles). It took over from "Someone You Loved" by Lewis Capaldi, which has managed to stay in the Top 75 for 99 consecutive weeks, with "Mr Brightside" dipping in and out of the Top 75 at various times over the last two decades. "Last Christmas" has spent the most weeks in the Top 3. "All I Want for Christmas Is You" has spent the most weeks in the Top 10 and Top 40. When only a Top 50 was compiled, Frank Sinatra's "My Way" set a record which still stands: 122 weeks in the Top 50 between April 1969 and January 1972. It also held the record for most weeks in the top 40 with 75, until The Pogues' "Fairytale of New York" achieved its 76th week in the region in 2021 and most weeks in the top 75 with 124, which was surpassed by Ed Sheeran's "Perfect" in 2021.

The longest unbroken run in the Top 100 is 105 weeks for "Blinding Lights" by The Weeknd, which also holds the longest consecutive run in the top 75 (103 weeks). Engelbert Humperdinck's "Release Me" held the record run in the Top 50, at 56 weeks, for over 40 years until beaten by "All of Me" by John Legend with 58 consecutive weeks in the top 50 (since passed by "Thinking Out Loud" with 63 weeks). The song with the most weeks at No. 1 is "I Believe" by Frankie Laine which stayed in the Top 10 for 35 weeks, 18 of them at No. 1 and a further seven at No. 2. Also noteworthy is "Rock Around the Clock" by Bill Haley & His Comets, the only song released in the 1950s to appear in the lists, which achieved 36 of its weeks when only a Top 20 or Top 30 were published.

In the pre-digital era, Christmas-themed songs were often re-released in different years and several have continued to chart each year from the mid-2000s onwards. "Merry Xmas Everybody" by Slade has had 27 chart runs in 30 different years (1973–74, 1980–87, 1989–90 and 2006–23), while "Fairytale of New York" by the Pogues and Kirsty MacColl has reached the Top 10 ten times and spent a record 70 weeks in the Top 20 and 84 weeks in the Top 40. In a similar but more modest way, since 2007, "Thriller" by Michael Jackson and "Ghostbusters" by Ray Parker Jr. have charted at Halloween in fifteen and thirteen years, respectively.

The numbers shown are up to the chart for week ending 15 December 2024. A star sign (*) indicates that the song is in the current week's chart.

== Songs with 20 or more weeks in the Top 3 ==
4 songs have spent 20 or more weeks in the Top 3 of the UK Charts."Last Christmas" by Wham! holds the record for the most weeks in the top 3 history with 32 weeks." Rein Me In is at 27 weeks in second.I Believe" by Frankie Laine is in third place with 26 weeks and All I Want for Christmas Is You" by Mariah Carey is in fourth place with 23 weeks.

== Songs with 20 or more weeks in the Top 10 ==
36 songs have spent 20 or more weeks in the Top 10 of the UK Charts. "Rein Me In" by Sam Fender and Olivia Dean holds the record for the most weeks in the Top 10 history with 54 weeks, as well as the most consecutive weeks in the top 10 with 39 weeks. "Fairytale of New York" by The Pogues featuring Kirsty MacColl holds the record for the most weeks in the Top 10 without reaching number one with 39 weeks.

Song	Artist	Year first entered chart	Chart peak	Total weeks in top 10	Consecutive weeks	Reference
"Rein Me In"	Sam Fender and Olivia Dean	2025	1	54	39	
"All I Want for Christmas Is You"	Mariah Carey	1994	1	53	5	
"Last Christmas"	Wham!	1984	1	51†	7	
"Fairytale of New York"	The Pogues	1987	2	39	5	
"Man I Need"	Olivia Dean	2025	1	39	17	
"As It Was"	Harry Styles	2022	1	37	18	
"I Believe"	Frankie Laine	1953	1	35	35	
"Beautiful Things"	Benson Boone	2024	1	34	17	
"Lush Life"	Zara Larsson	2016	3	33	13	
"Someone You Loved"	Lewis Capaldi	2018	1	31	20	
"Cruel Summer"	Taylor Swift	2019	2	29	13	
"Secret Love"	Doris Day	1954	1	27	27	
"Calm Down"	Rema	2022	3	27	25	
"Ordinary"	Alex Warren	2025	1	26	23	
"Don't Start Now"	Dua Lipa	2019	2	25	18	
"The Happy Wanderer"	Obernkirchen Children's Choir	1954	2	24	22	
"Stick Season"	Noah Kahan	2023	1	24	23	
"Terry's Theme from Limelight"	Frank Chacksfield	1953	2	23	23	
"One Dance"	Drake featuring Wizkid and Kyla	2016	1	23	23	
"Espresso"	Sabrina Carpenter	2024	1	23	16	
"Rockin' Around the Christmas Tree"	Brenda Lee	1962	3	23	4	
"So Easy (To Fall in Love)"	Olivia Dean	2025	2	23	13	
"Because You're Mine"	Mario Lanza	1952	3	22	22	
"The Song from Moulin Rouge"	Mantovani	1953	1	22	21	
"Relax"	Frankie Goes to Hollywood	1983	1	22	10	
"What Do You Mean?"	Justin Bieber	2015	1	22	22	
"Shape of You"	Ed Sheeran	2017	1	22	22	
"Blinding Lights"	The Weeknd	2019	1	22	21	
"Bad Habits"	Ed Sheeran	2021	1	22	22	
"Peru"	Fireboy DML and Ed Sheeran	2021	2	22	22	
"Prada"	Cassö, Raye and D-Block Europe	2023	2	22	14	
"Pink Pony Club"	Chappell Roan	2024	1	22	22	
"Golden"	Huntrix	2025	1	22	20	
"She Loves You"	The Beatles	1963	1	21	21	
"(Everything I Do) I Do It for You"	Bryan Adams	1991	1	21	21	
"Austin"	Dasha	2024	5	21	21	
"Oh Mein Papa"	Eddie Calvert	1953	1	20	20	
"Little Things Mean a Lot"	Kitty Kallen	1954	1	20	20	
"Cara Mia"	David Whitfield with Mantovani and His Orchestra	1954	1	20	19	
"Rock Around the Clock"	Bill Haley and His Comets	1955	1	20	15	
"Bohemian Rhapsody"	Queen	1978	1	20†	12	
"Love Is All Around"	Wet Wet Wet	1994	1	20	20	
"Happy"	Pharrell Williams	2013	1	20	20	
"Thinking Out Loud"	Ed Sheeran	2014	1	20	20	
"Greedy"	Tate McRae	2023	3	20	11	
"Choosin' Texas"	Ella Langley	2026	1	20	20	

† multiple versions combined

== Songs with 50 or more weeks in the Top 40 ==
The Top 40 chart has been broadcast weekly on BBC Radio 1 (currently as The Official Chart) since 12 November 1978 and is often referred to as 'the charts'. Appearing in the Top 40 can greatly increase a song's exposure on television and radio. "All I Want for Christmas Is You" by Mariah Carey holds the record for the most weeks in the Top 40 history with 101 weeks. In June 2015, "Thinking Out Loud" by Ed Sheeran became the first single to stay in the Top 40 for 54 consecutive weeks – equivalent to one year, having spent a record-breaking 18 weeks in the chart before reaching No. 1. This record was then passed by Sam Fender and Olivia Dean's Reign Me In in 2026.

Song	Artist	Year first entered chart	Chart peak	Total weeks in top 40	Consecutive weeks	Reference
"All I Want for Christmas Is You"	Mariah Carey	1994	1	108	7	
"Fairytale of New York"	The Pogues featuring Kirsty MacColl	1987	2	101	8	
"Last Christmas"	Wham!	1984	1	96	11	
"Ordinary"	Alex Warren	2025	1	87	45	
"Beautiful Things"	Benson Boone	2024	1	87*	45	
"My Way"	Frank Sinatra	1969	5	75	16	
"Heat Waves"	Glass Animals	2020	5	73	30	
"Blinding Lights"	The Weeknd	2019	1	70	48	
"Rein Me In"	Sam Fender & Olivia Dean	2025	1	69	69	
"Someone You Loved"	Lewis Capaldi	2018	1	69	49	
"Do They Know It's Christmas?"	Band Aid	1984	1	66	11	
"As It Was"	Harry Styles	2022	1	66	33	
"Lose Control"	Teddy Swims	2023	2	66	48	
"Merry Christmas Everyone"	Shakin' Stevens	1985	1	61	7	
"Merry Xmas Everybody"	Slade	1973	1	60	9	
"Stick Season"	Noah Kahan	2022	1	58	49	
"Thinking Out Loud"	Ed Sheeran	2014	1	56	54	
"I Wish It Could Be Christmas Everyday"	Wizzard	2007	10	56 (Note: This excludes versions of the same song, released in the physical era, which have the additional credit 'Vocal backing by The Suedettes, plus The Stockland Green Bilateral School first year choir. Additional noises Miss Snob and Class 3C'. The original 1973 version did 9 weeks on the chart peaking at number 4, whilst the re-recording in the 1980s spent 8 weeks on the chart, originally peaking at number 23.)	5	
"Good Luck, Babe!"	Chappell Roan	2024	2	55	33	
"All of Me"	John Legend	2014	2	54	44	
"Birds of a Feather"	Billie Eilish	2024	2	54*	28	
"Pink Pony Club"	Chappell Roan	2024	1	53	43	
"Stranger on the Shore"	Acker Bilk	1961	2	52	45	
"Rockin' Around the Christmas Tree"	Brenda Lee	1962	3	52	7	
"Dance Monkey"	Tones and I	2019	1	52	50	
"Bad Habits"	Ed Sheeran	2021	1	52	29	
"Happy"	Pharrell Williams	2013	1	50	49	
"Die with a Smile"	Lady Gaga and Bruno Mars	2024	2	50	19	

== Songs with 65 or more weeks in the Top 75 ==
The Top 75 was published each week by Music Week magazine until March 2021 (when it became a monthly publication), with records reaching the top 75 described as hits (as in the case of The Virgin/Guinness Book of British Hit Singles). Since March 2021, the Official Charts Company have compiled a monthly Top 75 chart countdown for the publication. In regards to the weekly chart, the longest continuous run in the Top 75 is 103 weeks for "Blinding Lights" by The Weeknd (December 2019 to November 2021). In 2014, "Happy" by Pharrell Williams and "Let It Go" by Idina Menzel became the first singles ever to stay in the Top 75 for a whole calendar year, since also achieved by "Blinding Lights" in 2020. Frank Sinatra's "My Way" held the record for most weeks in the top 75 for nearly 50 years until it was broken by "Perfect" in 2021.

Song	Artist	Year first entered chart	Chart peak	Total weeks in top 75	Consecutive weeks	Reference
"Mr. Brightside"	The Killers	2004	10	262*	29	
"Someone You Loved"	Lewis Capaldi	2018	1	159	99	
"Beautiful Things"	Benson Boone	2024	1	133*	48	
"Perfect"	Ed Sheeran	2017	1	130	62	
"My Way"	Frank Sinatra	1969	5	124†	42	
"All I Want for Christmas Is You"	Mariah Carey	1994	1	124	8	
"Last Christmas"	Wham!	1984	1	122†	13	
"Fairytale of New York"	The Pogues featuring Kirsty MacColl	1987	2	119	9	
"Heat Waves"	Glass Animals	2020	5	117	68	
"Chasing Cars"	Snow Patrol	2006	6	111	48	
"Merry Xmas Everybody"	Slade	1973	1	109	9	
"Blinding Lights"	The Weeknd	2019	1	106	103	
"Do They Know It's Christmas?"	Band Aid	1984	1	99	13	
"Thinking Out Loud"	Ed Sheeran	2014	1	91	73	
"Shotgun"	George Ezra	2018	1	91	80	
"As It Was"	Harry Styles	2022	1	91	45	
"Merry Christmas Everyone"	Shakin' Stevens	1985	1	90	8	
"Sex on Fire"	Kings of Leon	2008	1	90	42	
"Riptide"	Vance Joy	2013	10	85	21	
"Stick Season"	Noah Kahan	2022	1	85	64	
"Dance Monkey"	Tones and I	2019	1	83	67	
"Pompeii"	Bastille	2013	2	80	30	
"Lose Control"	Teddy Swims	2023	2	79*	51	
"I Wish It Could Be Christmas Everyday"	Wizzard	2007	10	78 (Note: This excludes versions of the same song, released in the physical era, which have the additional credit 'Vocal backing by The Suedettes, plus The Stockland Green Bilateral School first year choir. Additional noises Miss Snob and Class 3C'. The original 1973 version did 9 weeks on the chart peaking at number 4, whilst the re-recording in the 1980s spent 8 weeks on the chart, originally peaking at number 23.)	6	
"I Gotta Feeling"	The Black Eyed Peas	2009	1	78	63	
"Rather Be"	Clean Bandit featuring Jess Glynne	2014	1	78	73	
"Use Somebody"	Kings of Leon	2008	2	77	40	
"Rule the World"	Take That	2007	2	75	30	
"All of Me"	John Legend	2014	2	75	68	
"Shape of You"	Ed Sheeran	2017	1	75	70	
"Happy"	Pharrell Williams	2013	1	74	70	
"Chandelier"	Sia	2014	6	74	53	
"Die with a Smile"	Lady Gaga and Bruno Mars	2024	2	74	61	
"Someone like You"	Adele	2011	1	72	61	
"Seventeen Going Under"	Sam Fender	2021	3	71*	51	
"Driving Home for Christmas"	Chris Rea	1988	10	71	6	
"Another Love"	Tom Odell	2012	10	70	19	
"Rockin' Around the Christmas Tree"	Brenda Lee	1962	4	69	6	
"Iris"	Goo Goo Dolls	1998	3	68*	10	
"Amazing Grace"	Judy Collins	1970	5	67	32	
"Cruel Summer"	Taylor Swift	2019	2	67	24	
"Don't Stop Believin'"	Journey	1982	6	66	48	
"Poker Face"	Lady Gaga	2009	1	66	46	
"Take Me to Church"	Hozier	2014	2	66	63	
"Wonderwall"	Oasis	1995	2	65	20	
"I'm Yours"	Jason Mraz	2008	11	65	47	
"Photograph"	Ed Sheeran	2014	15	65	45	
"This Is Me"	Keala Settle and The Greatest Showman Ensemble	2018	3	65	65	

† multiple versions combined

== Songs with 100 or more weeks in the Top 100 ==
The Top 100 is published each week by the Official Charts Company. 37 songs have reached 100 or more weeks in the Top 100. The longest continuous run in the Top 100 is 105 weeks for "Blinding Lights" by The Weeknd. Ed Sheeran is the only artist to have three songs reaching 100 weeks on the top 100. The Weeknd, Fleetwood Mac, Kings of Leon and Oasis appear twice on the list.

On 4 February 2022, "Mr Brightside" became the first song to hit 300 weeks in the top 100. It has subsequently passed 400 weeks, spending all but the Christmas period in the Top 100 every year since 2021.

Song	Artist	Year first entered chart	Chart peak	Total weeks in top 100	Consecutive weeks	Reference
"Mr. Brightside"	The Killers	2004	10	531*	48	
"Someone You Loved"	Lewis Capaldi	2018	1	258	100	
"Iris"	Goo Goo Dolls	1998	3	242*	25	
"Perfect"	Ed Sheeran	2017	1	191	67	
"Riptide"	Vance Joy	2013	10	187*	49	
"Chasing Cars"	Snow Patrol	2006	6	166	88	
"Viva la Vida"	Coldplay	2008	1	166*	50	
"Blinding Lights"	The Weeknd	2019	1	147	105	
"All I Want for Christmas Is You"	Mariah Carey	1994	1	140	8	
"Heat Waves"	Glass Animals	2020	5	140	100	
"Shotgun"	George Ezra	2018	1	134	87	
"My Way"	Frank Sinatra	1969	5	133†	25	
"Fairytale of New York"	The Pogues featuring Kirsty MacColl	1987	2	133	9	
"Sex on Fire"	Kings of Leon	2008	1	132	89	
"Last Christmas	Wham!	1984	1	131†	13	
"Another Love"	Tom Odell	2012	10	130	22	
"Merry Xmas Everybody"	Slade	1973	1	124	9	
"Dreams"	Fleetwood Mac	1977	24	123*	15	
"Wonderwall"	Oasis	1995	2	123	30	
"Don't Stop Believin'"	Journey	1981	1	120	88	
"Thinking Out Loud"	Ed Sheeran	2014	1	119	95	
"Take Me to Church"	Hozier	2014	2	117	85	
"Shallow"	Lady Gaga and Bradley Cooper	2018	1	116	60	
"Dance Monkey"	Tones and I	2019	1	116	71	
"Beautiful Things"	Benson Boone	2024	1	116*	99	
"Everywhere"	Fleetwood Mac	1987	4	115*	38	
"Chandelier"	Sia	2014	6	114	72	
"Bad Habits"	Ed Sheeran	2021	1	114	49	
"Whatever"	Oasis	1994	3	113	32	
"Pompeii"	Bastille	2013	2	112	92	
"Do They Know It's Christmas?"	Band Aid	1984	1	111	13	
"Save Your Tears"	The Weeknd	2021	2	110	49	
"Seventeen Going Under"	Sam Fender	2021	3	110*	58	
"I Gotta Feeling"	The Black Eyed Peas	2009	1	109	75	
"Radioactive"	Imagine Dragons	2012	12	107	51	
"Merry Christmas Everyone"	Shakin' Stevens	1985	1	103	8	
"Use Somebody"	Kings of Leon	2008	2	103	64	
"Rule the World"	Take That	2007	2	102	77	
"As It Was"	Harry Styles	2022	1	102	88	

† multiple versions combined

== Notable singles ==
=== "Blue Monday" ===
New Order's "Blue Monday" includes the remixed version of the original, which was finally made available as a single for the first time in 1988 with almost the same catalogue number; sales for this shorter version and the original were combined, when calculating its chart position. The second remix, from 1995, charted for four weeks but is excluded from this list.

=== "Merry Xmas Everybody" ===
In addition to Slade's total of 114 weeks in the Top 100 for "Merry Xmas Everybody", they also had two remixes of the song, not counted because they were re-recorded with other artists. The first, from 1980, was credited to Slade and the Reading Choir; the second, from 1998, was credited to Slade vs. Flush, which peaked at No. 30 and accumulated four weeks in the top 100.

=== "I Wish It Could Be Christmas Everyday" ===
The original version credited to Wizzard 'featuring vocal backing by The Suedettes plus The Stockland Green Bilateral School First Year Choir with additional noises by Miss Snob and Class 3C' spent nine weeks in the charts in 1973–74. When the record was going to be re-released in the 1980s, it was found that the master tapes had been lost and so Roy Wood re-recorded a solo sound-a-like version with children from Kempsey Primary School in 1981 and this was released on Harvest Records, credited to Wizzard with the same catalogue number.

This 1981 version was also re-issued in 1984 when it reached number 23 in the charts. However, the week before Wizzard charted at number 50 on the Top 75 of 09 – 15 December 1984, "I Wish It Could Be Christmas Everyday" appeared as a new entry at number 86 credited to Roy Wood and Wizzard. It was this record which re-charted with another week in 1985 and in 1986, giving "I Wish It Could Be Christmas Everyday" 11 weeks on the chart overall during the 1980s. In the digital age of streaming and downloads (from 2007 to 2021), the 1981 version has spent 64 weeks in the charts credited simply to Wizzard with the label rights being credited to EMI, making a total of 85 weeks in the Top 100 for the record overall.

In 1995, Wood recorded a live version and released it as a single on his own independent record label Woody Recordings. Credited to Roy Wood Big Band, this live track charted at Number 59 in the UK Singles Chart and stayed in the Top 100 for 2 weeks. Then in 2000, Wood re-recorded the song as part of a medley with The Wombles's song "Wombling Merry Christmas". This medley was released as "I Wish It Could Be a Wombling Christmas Everyday" and reached number 22 in the UK Singles Chart.

=== "White Lines" ===
Grandmaster Melle Mel's "White Lines (Don't Don't Do It)" was remixed in 1994 and charted for an additional three weeks, making 46 in total in the top 75 (61 in the top 100 including one in 2004). It was also re-recorded in 1995 by Duran Duran featuring Melle Mel and Grandmaster Flash and the Furious Five and charted for another five weeks (not counted towards its total).

=== "Three Lions" ===
"Three Lions", recorded by Baddiel and Skinner and The Lightning Seeds, is not eligible for the above list for either version but has clocked up an impressive 57 weeks on the UK Singles Chart Top 75 under the guise of "Three Lions" and "3 Lions '98" and 67 weeks in the Top 100. It was originally released in 1996 as "Three Lions", then subsequently re-recorded with different lyrics in 1998 as "3 Lions '98", a version which was re-issued in 2002. Then in 2006, both recordings were re-issued on a Sony DualDisc as "Three Lions/Three Lions '98", with "Three Lions" charting again in 2010 due to downloads. In 2018, "Three Lions" reached No. 1 in the UK Chart for one week, due to England's success at the World Cup, with the 1998 version being combined under the original's sales total, and re-charted in 2021 due to the UEFA Euro 2020 Championship taking place. Skinner, Baddiel and Broudie were also part of a version released in 2010 by The Squad, aptly called "Three Lions 2010"; this version tallied up a further six weeks in addition to the 67 weeks, but is seen as a separate recording act by the Official Charts Company.

== See also ==
- List of albums which have spent the most weeks on the UK Albums Chart
- List of artists who have spent the most weeks on the UK music charts
