= A Couple Minutes =

2026 single by Olivia Dean

- ColorsxStudios version cover

Single by Olivia Dean

from the album The Art of Loving
- Released: 13 July 2026
- Studio: The House of Loving; Rollover Studios (London)
- Length: 3:32
- Label: Capitol; Island; Republic
- Songwriters: Olivia Dean; James Hawkins; Zach Nahome; Louis Ragland; Michael Stafford
- Producer: Zach Nahome

Olivia Dean singles chronology
"So Easy (To Fall in Love)" (2025)	"A Couple Minutes" (2026)	"Baby Steps" (2026)

Lyric video
- "A Couple Minutes" on YouTube

"A Couple Minutes" is a song by English singer Olivia Dean from her second studio album, The Art of Loving (2025). Dean co-wrote the song with Irish musician Michael Stafford and its producer, Zach Nahome; it samples the guitar riff from the 1971 song "We Had True Love" by Hot Chocolate, whose writers, Louis Ragland and James Hawkins, are credited as co-writers as a result. Island and Republic Records serviced the song to hot adult contemporary and contemporary hit radio stations in the United States as the album's third US radio single and fifth overall on 13 and 14 July 2026, respectively.

Influenced by the Motown sound and Clairo's third studio album, Charm (2024), "A Couple Minutes" is a "tender" ballad backed by strings that explores the intimacy of reconnecting with a past lover, however brief it may be. It was nominated for Best Traditional Pop Vocal Performance at the 69th Annual Grammy Awards (2027). "A Couple Minutes" reached number one in the Netherlands and Sweden and was certified platinum or higher in Australia, Brazil, New Zealand, and the United Kingdom. It also reached number thirteen on the UK Singles Chart and number twenty-six on the US Billboard Hot 100.

== Background and release ==
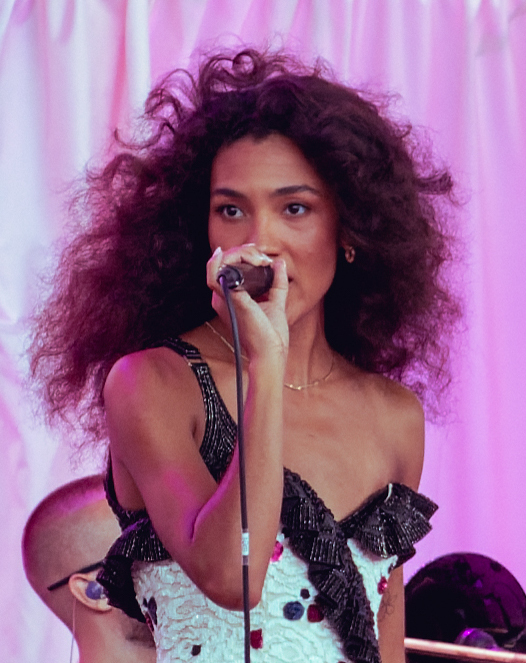
Olivia Dean in 2025

In June 2023, Olivia Dean released her debut studio album, Messy, which received generally favorable reviews from music critics, peaked at number four on the UK Albums Chart, and received a gold certification from the British Phonographic Industry (BPI). After its release, Dean started working on her next album. In an interview with Paper, Dean shared that she had been "working really hard" on it, expressing a desire to "sing for everybody" and be welcomed with "open arms" and "love", a gesture she described as a "vulnerable" act. The album was written and recorded in a grand house in East London transformed into a live-work studio for eight weeks between March and April 2025.

"A Couple Minutes" was originally released for digital download and streaming as the eleventh track from Dean's second studio album, The Art of Loving, on 26 September 2025, with the ColorsxStudios version being released a month later on 22 October. It was serviced to hot adult contemporary and contemporary hit radio stations in the United States as the album's third US radio single and fifth overall on 13 and 14 July 2026, respectively. Dean performed "A Couple Minutes" live at the MOBO Awards 2026 and included it on the set list of her second concert tour, The Art of Loving Live (2026–2027). The song was nominated for Best Traditional Pop Vocal Performance at the 69th Annual Grammy Awards (2027).

== Composition ==
"A Couple Minutes"
A 15-second sample of the chorus to "A Couple Minutes". Influenced by the Motown sound and Clairo's third studio album, Charm (2024), the song is a "tender" ballad backed by strings that explores the intimacy of reconnecting with a past lover, however brief it may be.

"A Couple Minutes" is three minutes and 32 seconds long. Zach Nahome produced the song, playing drums and programming its rhythm. Olivia Dean and Michael Stafford provide background vocals, with strings performed by Wired Strings and arranged by Rosie Danvers, engineered by Nick Taylor, and produced by Tommy Danvers. Nahome also handled engineering, with mastering engineering from Simon Francis and mixing engineering from Charlie Holmes; Matt J. Barnes provided additional mixing engineering.

"A Couple Minutes" is a "tender" ballad backed by strings that samples the guitar riff from the 1971 song "We Had True Love" by the Cleveland band Hot Chocolate. The song is influenced by the Motown sound and Clairo's third studio album, Charm (2024). Over a violin instrumental, Dean sings about reconnecting with a past lover, exploring the intimacy of the moment, however brief it may be. She finds a silver lining in their unsuccessful relationship, suggesting that although they are now distant from each other, their mutual affection remains, and notes that "love's never wasted when it's shared".

== Reception ==
Thomas Smith of Billboard ranked "A Couple Minutes" as the sixth-best song from The Art of Loving, saying the soundscape "perfectly suits Dean's aesthetic and talents" and praising how the influences shape the song. Adele Julia of The Line of Best Fit described it as "a soft interlude that stands apart from the rest, feeling like a glimpse of calm after the grandiose spectacle of Saturday night". Zoe V. of Renowned for Sound said it "feels like a pause in time, it's blend of soft chords and smooth vocals make you feel as though you're catching a breath with her – reflecting on what it means to let life unfold, slowly and gently". Larisha Paul of Rolling Stone said it "aches to be a duet".

"A Couple Minutes" became Dean's third top-twenty single on the UK Singles Chart and received a platinum certification from the British Phonographic Industry. The song peaked at number twenty-six on the US Billboard Hot 100 issued for 24 January 2026, becoming her only single to reach the top thirty, and received a gold certification from the Recording Industry Association of America. It reached number thirty-eight on the Canadian Hot 100 issued for 17 January 2026 and became Dean's second top-forty single. In Australia, the song charted at number thirteen and received a 2× platinum certification from the Australian Recording Industry Association. It peaked at number four in New Zealand (Note: The ColorsxStudios version peaked at number ten on the New Zealand Hot Singles chart issued for 31 October 2025.) and was certified 3× platinum.

"A Couple Minutes" reached number forty on the Billboard Global 200. Elsewhere, the song charted at number one on the Single Tip chart in the Netherlands and the Heatseeker chart in Sweden, number twenty-two on the US Adult Pop Airplay chart, number twenty-seven on the Philippines Hot 100, number twenty-nine on the US Pop Airplay chart, number forty-seven on the Irish Singles Chart, and number eighty-nine in Portugal. "A Couple Minutes" was certified platinum in Brazil and gold in Belgium and Portugal.

== Credits and personnel ==
Credits are adapted from Tidal.

- Olivia Dean – vocals, songwriting, background vocals
- Zach Nahome – songwriting, production, engineering, drums, rhythm programming
- Michael Stafford – songwriting, background vocals
- James Hawkins – songwriting
- Louis Ragland – songwriting
- Charlie Holmes – mixing engineer
- Matt J. Barnes – additional mixing engineer
- Simon Francis – mastering engineer
- Wired Strings (Note: Wired Strings consists of violinists Charis Jenson, Hayley Pomfrett, Jenny Sacha, Kerenza Peacock, Michael Trainor, Patrick Kiernan, Sarah Sexton, and Zahra Benyounes; violists Emma Owens and Meghan Cassidy; and cellists Rosie Danvers and Bryony James.) – strings
- Rosie Danvers – string arranger
- Nick Taylor – string engineer
- Tommy Danvers – string producer

== Charts ==
=== Original version ===
Chart performance for "A Couple Minutes"
Chart (2025–2026)	Peak position
Australia (ARIA)	13
Canada Hot 100 (Billboard)	38
Global 200 (Billboard)	40
Ireland (IRMA)	47
Netherlands (Single Tip)	1
New Zealand (Recorded Music NZ)	4
Philippines Hot 100 (Billboard Philippines)	27
Portugal (AFP)	89
Sweden Heatseeker (Sverigetopplistan)	1
UK Singles (Official Charts)	13
US Billboard Hot 100	26
US Adult Pop Airplay (Billboard)	22
US Pop Airplay (Billboard)	29

=== A Colors Show version ===
Chart performance for "A Couple Minutes (A Colors Show)"
Chart (2025)	Peak position
New Zealand Hot Singles (Recorded Music NZ)	10

== Certifications ==
Certifications for "A Couple Minutes"
Region	Certification	Certified units/sales
Australia (ARIA)	2× Platinum	140,000^{‡}
Belgium (BRMA)	Gold	20,000^{‡}
Brazil (Pro-Música Brasil)	Platinum	40,000^{‡}
New Zealand (RMNZ)	3× Platinum	90,000^{‡}
Portugal (AFP)	Gold	12,000^{‡}
United Kingdom (BPI)	Platinum	600,000^{‡}
United States (RIAA)	Gold	500,000^{‡}
^{‡} Sales+streaming figures based on certification alone.

== Release history ==
Release dates and formats for "A Couple Minutes"
Region	Date	Format	Version	Label(s)	Ref.
Various	26 September 2025	Digital download; streaming	Original	Capitol	
Various	22 October 2025	Digital download; streaming	A Colors Show	Capitol	
United States	13 July 2026	Hot adult contemporary radio	Original	Island; Republic	
United States	14 July 2026	Contemporary hit radio	Original	Island; Republic	
