= MOBO Awards 2026 =

UK awards for black musicians

- Awarded for: Excellence in music of black origin
- Sponsored by: Manchester City Council; Amazon Music; BBC; Co-op Live; got2b; Prostate Cancer UK; Trench; Vevo
- Date: 26 March 2026
- Location: Co-op Live, Manchester, England
- Country: United Kingdom
- Hosted by: Eve; Eddie Kadi

Highlights
- Most wins: Olivia Dean
- Most nominations: Little Simz; Olivia Dean; Kwn; Jim Legxacy
- Website: mobo.com

Television/radio coverage
- Network: Twitch; BBC One

The MOBO Awards 2026 was the 28th edition of the MOBO Awards. It took place on 26 March 2026, at the Co-op Live in Manchester, England. It honoured achievements in music of black origin. Live streamed on Twitch, it is sponsored by Manchester City Council, Amazon Music, BBC, Co-op Live, got2b, Prostate Cancer UK, Trench, and Vevo. The nominations were announced on 15 January 2026, with Little Simz, Olivia Dean, Kwn, and Jim Legxacy leading with four nominations apiece.

Olivia Dean was the most awarded artist of the ceremony with three awards, including Album of the Year for The Art of Loving and Song of the Year for "Man I Need". American-British rapper Slick Rick was honored with the Lifetime Achievement Award while American singer-songwriter and record producer Pharrell Williams was awarded with the Global Songwriter Award.

== Winners and nominees ==
Below is the list of nominees. Winners are listed in bold.

Winners and nominees
**Best Newcomer**: **DC3**; EsDeeKid; Finessekid; Jim Legxacy; Kwn; Namesbliss; Nia Smith; Sekou; Skye Newman; YT	**Song of the Year**: **Olivia Dean - "Man I Need"**; AJ Tracey feat. Jorja Smith - "Crush"; Donae'o feat. Omar, Lemar, and House Gospel Choir - "Nights Like This"; Fred Again, Skepta, and PlaqueBoyMax - "Victory Lap"; Jim Legxacy and Dave - "3x"; Kwn - "Do What I Say"; Myles Smith - "Nice to Meet You"; PinkPantheress - "Illegal"; Raye - "Where Is My Husband!"; Tim Duzit - "Kat Slater"
**Video of the Year**: **Raye - "Where Is My Husband!" (Directed By Ed Reid and Will Reid)**; Pozer - "Shanghigh Noon" (Directed By Bas Haselager, Tom van Groningen, Arseni Novo, and Ivar Atilgan); FKA Twigs - "Eusexua" (Directed By Jordan Hemingway); Jim Legxacy and Dave - "3x" (Directed By Rohan.dil); Little Simz - "Flood" (Directed By Salomon Ligthelm); Skepta and Fred Again - "Back 2 Back"(Directed By Domamanic)	**Best African Music Act**: **Wizkid**; Adekunle Gold; Ayra Starr; Davido; Joshua Baraka; Moliy; Rema; Shallipopi; Tiwa Savage; Tyla
**Best International Act**: **Ayra Starr**; Cardi B; Clipse; Gunna; Kehlani; Leon Thomas; Mariah the Scientist; Moliy; Tyla; Vybz Kartel	**Best Media Personality**: **Niko Omilana**; Bemi Orojuogun (Bus Aunty); Dj Ag; In My Opinion; Melissa Holdbrook-Akposoe (Melissas Wardrobe); Nadia Jae; Pk Humble; Remi Burgz; Uche Natori; Winners Talking
**Best Performance in a TV Show/Film**: **Stephen Graham as Eddie Miller in Adolescence**; Aaron Pierre as Mufasa in Mufasa: The Lion King; Ashley Thomas as Dr. Alex Anderson in Hostage; Ashley Walters as DI Luke Bascombe in Adolescence; Cynthia Erivo as Elphaba in Wicked; Damson Idris as Joshua Pearce in F1; Dayo Koleosho - as Kojo Asare in EastEnders; Lennie James as Barrington Jedidiah "Barry" Walker in Mr Loverman; Marianne Jean-Baptiste as Pansy Deacon in Hard Truths; Wunmi Mosaku as Annie in Sinners	**Best Male Act**: **Jim Legxacy**; Central Cee; Elmiene; Nemzzz; Odeal; Skepta
**Best Female Act**: **Olivia Dean**; Flo; Kwn; Little Simz; PinkPantheress; Sasha Keable	**Album of the Year**: **Olivia Dean - The Art of Loving**; Central Cee - Can't Rush Greatness; Ezra Collective - Dance, No One's Watching; Flo - Access All Areas; Kojey Radical - Don't Look Down; Little Simz - Lotus
**Best Hip-hop Act**: **Central Cee**; Aitch; Asco; Catch; D-Block Europe; Kojey Radical; Little Simz; Loyle Carner; Wretch 32; Youngs Teflon	**Best R&B/Soul Act**: **Flo**; Elmiene; Kwn; Odeal; Olivia Dean; Sasha Keable
**Best Drill Act**: **Twin S**; 36; Booter Bee; Chy Cartier; EsDeeKid; K-Trap; Leostaytrill; Nemzzz; Pozer; Wohdee	**Best Grime Act**: **Chip**; Jayahadadream; Kasst 8; Ruff Sqwad; Scorcher; Wiley
**Best Alternative Music Act**: **Nova Twins**; Alt Blk Era; Blood Orange; Hak Baker; Michael Kiwanuka; Rachel Chinouriri	**Best Caribbean Music Act**: **Vybz Kartel**; Ayetian; Lila Iké; Masicka; Shenseea; Yung Bredda
**Best Electronic Act**: **Sherelle**; FKA Twigs; Jazzy; Kilimanjaro; PinkPantheress; Salute	**Best Jazz Act**: **Ezra Collective**; Cktrl; Ego Ella May; Kokoroko; Nubya Garcia; Yazmin Lacey
**Best Gospel Act**: **DC3**; Annatoria; Faith Child; Imrhan; Sondae; Still Shadey	**Best Producer**: **P2J**; Inflo; Jae5; Miles Clinton James; Sammy Soso; Zach Nahome

=== Special awards ===
- Pharrell Williams (Global Songwriter Award)
- Slick Rick (Lifetime Achievement Award)
