= Growth (EP) =

2021 EP by Olivia Dean

EP by Olivia Dean
- Released: 30 July 2021
- Length: 16:01
- Label: AMF

Olivia Dean chronology
Olivia Dean If You Know What I Mean (2021)	Growth (2021)	Live at the Jazz Café (2021)

Singles from Growth
- 1. "Be My Own Boyfriend" Released: 16 April 2021; 2. "Slowly" Released: 9 July 2021

Growth is the third extended play (fourth including a compilation) by British singer Olivia Dean. The EP was released on 30 July 2021. Following its fifth anniversary vinyl release, it peaked at number 42 on the UK Albums Chart in 2026.

In July 2021, Dean described the EP as "a time capsule of the last year, me processing a new perspective on love and loving myself."

== Critical reception ==
Elle Evans from Mixtape Madness said "Reputable for her heart-felt lyricism, rich vocal tone and top-notch artistry, the songstress has delivered yet another unblemished selection tracks for fans to indulge."

== Track listing ==
Growth track listing
No.	Title	Writer(s)	Producer(s)	Length
1.	"Be My Own Boyfriend"	Olivia Dean; Jonny Lattimer; Barney Lister	Barney Lister	3:27
2.	"Slowly"	Dean; Matt Hales	Hales	3:49
3.	"Cross My Mind"	Dean; Lister	Lister	2:51
4.	"Fall Again"	Dean; Fred Ball; Ari PenSmith	Fred Ball	2:51
5.	"Float"	Dean; Robin Hannibal; Max Wolfgang	Felix Joseph	3:03
Total length:				16:01

== Charts ==
Chart performance for Growth
Chart (2026)	Peak position
Austrian Albums (Ö3 Austria)	73
Belgian Albums (Ultratop Flanders)	9
Belgian Albums (Ultratop Wallonia)	32
Danish Vinyl Albums (Hitlisten)	17
Dutch Albums (Album Top 100)	6
Scottish Albums (Official Charts)	9
UK Albums (Official Charts)	42
US Vinyl Albums (Billboard)	22

== Certifications ==
Certifications for Growth
Region	Certification	Certified units/sales
United Kingdom (BPI)	Silver	60,000^{‡}
^{‡} Sales+streaming figures based on certification alone.

== Release history ==
Release dates and formats for Growth
Region	Date	Format(s)	Label	Catalogue	Ref.
Various	30 July 2021	Digital download; streaming	AMF; Universal Music Group		
Europe / Australia	31 July 2026	10" LP (limited)	Capitol UK	5766018	
