= List of artists who have spent the most weeks on the UK music charts =

This is a list of artists who have spent more than 1000 weeks in the top 75 UK singles chart and UK Albums Chart combined. Only 48 artists have achieved this milestone. It uses the methodology used to compile a top 500 list in the British Hit Singles & Albums books until 2005. Any album or single must be credited to the named artist and must appear in the top 75 singles or albums chart as recorded by the Official Charts Company.

Ed Sheeran has the most weeks on the singles charts with 1595 weeks. Cliff Richard, Elvis Presley, David Guetta, Justin Bieber, Drake and Rihanna are the only other artists to achieve over 1000 weeks in the singles chart. Ed Sheeran has had the most weeks in the singles chart since 2000.

Queen have the most weeks in the album chart followed by nineteen other artists with more than 1000 weeks. Besides them, only Oasis and Fleetwood Mac have spent more than 2000 weeks in the album chart.

David Bowie passed the 1000-week in the album chart mark following his death in January 2016, when 16 of his albums entered or re-entered the top 75. ABBA's 'Gold' became the first album to reach 1000 weeks on the top 100 UK albums chart in July 2021. Robbie Williams is the only artist to feature on the list twice: as a solo artist and with Take That.

Figures are as of chart week 18 - 24 September 2026.

Artist	Numbers of weeks			Ref
Artist	Singles chart	Albums chart	Combined	Ref
(United Kingdom) Ed Sheeran	1595	1635	3230	
(United States) Elvis Presley	1316	1721	3037	
(United States) Taylor Swift	835	1852	2687	
(United States) Michael Jackson	774	1836	2610	
(United Kingdom) Queen	464	2082	2546	
(United Kingdom) Oasis	475	2026	2501	
(United Kingdom) Fleetwood Mac	383	2043	2426	
(United Kingdom) The Beatles	474	1901	2375	
(United Kingdom) Elton John	823	1526	2349	
(United Kingdom) David Bowie	479	1663	2142	
(United Kingdom) Cliff Richard	1182	923	2105	
(United States) Eminem	595	1385	1980	
(United States) Madonna	786	1194	1980	
(Canada) Drake	1227	649	1876	
(Sweden) ABBA	273	1584	1857	
(Barbados) Rihanna	1163	574	1737	
(United Kingdom) Rod Stewart	471	1191	1662	
(Republic of Ireland) U2	364	1106	1470	
(United States) Frank Sinatra	471	932	1403	
(Canada) The Weeknd	746	651	1397	
(Jamaica) Bob Marley	196	1182	1378	
(United Kingdom) Arctic Monkeys	185	1162	1347	
(United States) Whitney Houston	378	949	1327	
(United Kingdom) The Rolling Stones	389	937	1326	
(United Kingdom) Coldplay	643	675	1318	
(Canada) Justin Bieber	1007	303	1310	
(France) David Guetta	1042	241	1283	
(United Kingdom) Calvin Harris	935	295	1230	
(United States) Pink	570	660	1230	
(United Kingdom) Adele	477	738	1215	
(United States) Diana Ross	573	634	1207	
(United States) Lady Gaga	730	477	1207	
(United Kingdom) Dua Lipa	633	554	1187	
(United States) Simon & Garfunkel	87	1092	1179	
(United States) Bruno Mars	668	480	1148	
(United Kingdom) George Michael	310	829	1139	
(United Kingdom) Take That	417	709	1126	
(United Kingdom) Robbie Williams	415	663	1078	
(United Kingdom) Phil Collins	251	818	1069	
(United States) Katy Perry	590	474	1064	
(United States) Beyoncé	682	381	1064	
(United Kingdom) Pink Floyd	57	1001	1058	
(United States) Ariana Grande	673	381	1054	
(United States) Kanye West	655	390	1045	
(United States) The Killers	392	641	1033	
(Australia) Kylie Minogue	526	498	1024	
(United Kingdom) Little Mix	523	492	1015	
(United Kingdom) Dire Straits	133	879	1011	

== See also ==
- List of songs which have spent the most weeks on the UK Singles Chart
