= The Art of Loving (album) =

Studio album by Olivia Dean
- Released: 26 September 2025
- Recorded: 2024–2025
- Genres: Pop; R&B; soul
- Length: 34:23
- Labels: Capitol; Polydor
- Producers: Julian Bunetta; Olivia Dean; Matt Hales; Bastian Langebæk; Leon Michels; Zach Nahome; John Ryan; Max Wolfgang; Matt Zara

Olivia Dean chronology
Messy (2023)	The Art of Loving (2025)

Singles from The Art of Loving
- 1. "Nice to Each Other" Released: 30 May 2025; 2. "Lady Lady" Released: 11 July 2025; 3. "Man I Need" Released: 15 August 2025; 4. "So Easy (To Fall in Love)" Released: 26 September 2025; 5. "A Couple Minutes" Released: 13 July 2026; 6. "Baby Steps" Released: 31 July 2026

The Art of Loving is the second studio album by British singer-songwriter Olivia Dean. It was released through Capitol Records and Polydor on 26 September 2025. A pop and R&B record, it features production from Dean herself, alongside Julian Bunetta, Matt Hales, Bastian Langebæk, Leon Michels, Zach Nahome, John Ryan, Max Wolfgang, and Matt Zara. It was supported by the singles: "Nice to Each Other", "Lady Lady", "Man I Need", "So Easy (To Fall in Love)", "A Couple Minutes" and "Baby Steps".

Upon its release, The Art of Loving received praise from music critics and won the British Album of the Year at the Brit Awards. Internationally, the album peaked at number one in Australia, Ireland, the Netherlands, and New Zealand, as well as the United Kingdom where Dean became the first British solo female artist to top the albums and singles charts simultaneously since 2023. The album debuted in the top ten globally on many charts, including the Billboard 200 and the Canadian Albums Chart. The album and its singles got nominated for six awards at the 69th Annual Grammy Awards, including Album of the Year.

== Background ==
In June 2023, Olivia Dean released her debut studio album, Messy, which received generally favorable reviews from music critics, peaked at number four on the UK Albums Chart, and received a gold certification from the British Phonographic Industry (BPI). After its release, Dean started working on her next album. In an interview with Paper, Dean shared that she had been "working really hard" on it, expressing a desire to "sing for everybody" and be welcomed with "open arms" and "love", a gesture she described as a "vulnerable" act. The album was written and recorded in a grand house in East London transformed into a live-work studio for eight weeks between March and April 2025.

== Composition and conception ==
I love bell hooks's book so much. It was one of those books that you wish everybody in your life could read. I thought that I would like to write an album reflecting on my understanding of love, the last two years of my life, and everything that's happened. It's obviously a topic that a lot of people have written songs about, I'm very aware, but I don't think that takes away from the importance of it. I just think it was very healing for me to make. [...] I went to the studio later that day [in London]. The seed for that title, The Art of Loving, was planted, and I had some songs that I knew I wanted to use, but the majority of the album really wasn't written until the end of March and April this year. So it's quite recent material. I dedicated eight weeks to writing the rest of it and finishing it.

— Dean, in an interview with Elle explaining the album conception and the influence of the exhibition.

The Art of Loving consists of twelve tracks, written by Dean herself in collaboration with songwriters and producers, including Julian Bunetta, Matt Hales, Leon Michels, John Ryan, Amy Allen and Sir Nolan. The album is a pop and R&B record, that incorporates elements of pop and neo-soul, bossa nova, jazz pop and Motown sound.

Dean explained that the album title was inspired by American painter Mickalene Thomas' art exhibition All About Love at The Broad in Los Angeles, California, which was in response to bell hooks' book "All About Love: New Visions".

On 1 October 2026, Mattie Music Group filed a lawsuit claiming that Dean's song "I've Seen It" had copied Grover Washington Jr. and Bill Withers 1981 single, "Just the Two of Us".

== Release and promotion ==
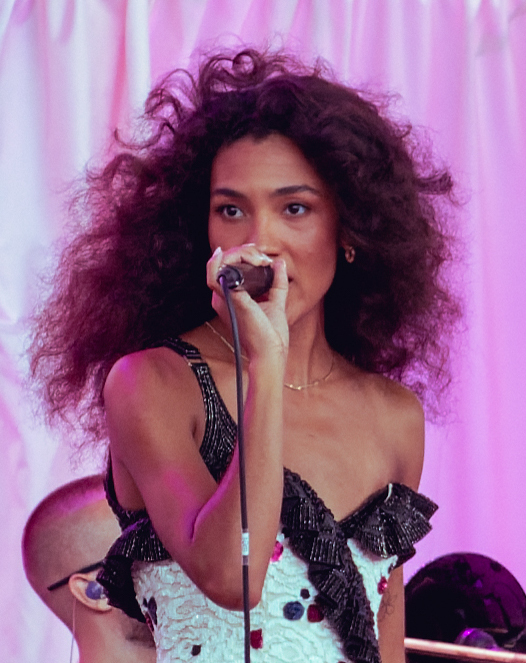
Dean in 2025

The album's release was preceded by several live performances, including joint appearances with Sabrina Carpenter and Sam Fender, as well as her own headlining North American tour. Dean announced The Art of Loving on 2 June 2025. The album was released on 26 September 2025 via Capitol Records and Polydor Records, issued through CD, vinyl LP, cassette, and digital formats.

=== Singles ===
The album's lead single, "Nice to Each Other", was released on 30 May 2025, and simultaneously announced the upcoming album. The album's second single, "Lady Lady", was released on 11 July 2025. The album's third single, "Man I Need", was released on 15 August 2025. The album's fourth single, "So Easy (To Fall in Love)", was released on 26 September 2025, coinciding with the full album. In July 2026, "A Couple Minutes" was released as a single for American radio and "Baby Steps" for Italian radio.

=== Tour ===
Dean performing on the Art of Loving Live tour in Sydney, Australia in October 2026.

The album was supported by The Art of Loving Live tour, which commenced 23 April 2026, in Glasgow, Scotland, and concluded on 17 October 2026, in Auckland, New Zealand.

== Critical reception ==
Professional ratings
Aggregate scores
Source	Rating
AnyDecentMusic?	8.0/10
Metacritic	84/100
Review scores
Source	Rating
AllMusic	4/5 stars
Clash	8/10
DIY	4/5 stars
The Guardian	4/5 stars
The Independent	5/5 stars
The Line of Best Fit	8/10
NME	4/5 stars
Pitchfork	6.9/10
Rolling Stone	4/5 stars
The Skinny	4/5 stars

Upon its release, The Art of Loving received widespread critical acclaim. According to the review aggregator Metacritic, The Art of Loving received "universal acclaim" based on a weighted average score of 84 out of 100 from 10 critic scores. The review aggregator AnyDecentMusic? assigned the album a weighted average score of 8.0 out of 10 from 13 critic scores. Writing for Rolling Stone, Larisha Paul praised the record as a significant artistic step forward, highlighting "Man I Need" and "Let Alone the One You Love" as career-defining moments and comparing Dean's balladry to Amy Winehouse, Adele, and early Beyoncé. Helen Brown of The Independent called it both "deep and breezy" and commended Dean's ability to "de-complicate and de-escalate romance with playful generosity." Similarly positive, Rhea Hagiwara of The Skinny saw it as "a continuation and a step forward" from her debut Messy, with a new level of "maturity and authenticity".

In The Guardian, Alexis Petridis credited Dean for shedding the "neo-soul clichés" of her debut in favour of 1970s Los Angeles-inspired pop and soft rock, while praising her understated vocals and diaristic lyrics. Clash described it as "a quiet, meditative exploration of love," while noting occasional repetitiveness in its pacing. The review nonetheless praised Dean's voice as the centrepiece of the record and "crystalline, versatile and laced with warmth". Andy Kellman of AllMusic called the album "a couple cuts above her promising debut." Emma Way of DIY said the album "is all of these lessons; from the need for independence ('Man I Need') to the art of letting go ('Let Alone the One You Love'), Olivia manages to convey all wisely, without becoming preachy." Adele Julia of The Line of Best Fit described Dean's performance as her "most compelling yet". Hannah Mylrea of NME said the album "marks the next chapter in Dean's career, one as a popstar risen." Some criticism was more reserved. Pitchfork's Walden Green characterised Dean's voice as warm and engaging but suggested that parts of the record leaned too heavily on retro pastiche, particularly on "Close Up" and "Baby Steps".

=== Rankings ===
Select year-end rankings for The Art of Loving
Publication/critic	List	Rank	Ref.
Billboard	The 50 Best Albums of 2025	5	
Complex	The 50 Best Albums of 2025	28	
Entertainment Weekly	The 10 Best Albums of 2025	8	
Exclaim!	The 50 Best Albums of 2025	12	
NME	The 25 Best Albums of 2025	18	
OOR	The 20 Best Albums of 2025	8	
Rolling Stone	The 100 Best Albums of 2025	28	
The Guardian	The 50 Best Albums of 2025	37	
Us Weekly	The Best Albums of 2025	N/A	
Vogue	The 45 Best Albums of 2025	N/A	

=== Industry awards ===
Awards and nominations for The Art Of Loving
Organisation	Year	Category	Result	Ref.
American Music Awards	2026	Album of the Year	Nominated	
American Music Awards	2026	Breakthrough Album of the Year	Nominated	
American Music Awards	2026	Best Pop Album	Nominated	
Brit Awards	2026	Album of the Year	Won	
Grammy Awards	2027	Album of the Year	Pending	
Grammy Awards	2027	Best Pop Vocal Album	Pending	
Grammy Awards	2027	Best Engineered Album, Non-Classical	Pending	
Ivor Novello Awards	2026	Best Album	Nominated	
Los 40 Music Awards	2026	Best International Album	Won	
Mercury Prize	2026	Album of the Year	Shortlisted	
MOBO Awards	2026	Album of the Year	Won	
MTV Video Music Awards	2026	Best Album	Nominated	
Music Producers Guild Awards	2026	Album of the Year	Won	

== Commercial performance ==
=== United Kingdom ===
In the United Kingdom, The Art of Loving debuted at number one on the UK Albums Chart with 52,366 album-equivalent units, marking Dean's first number-one album and the highest debut for a British female artist on the albums chart since Adele's 30 (2021). "Man I Need", the album's third single, also reached number one on the UK Singles Chart the same week as The Art of Loving's debut, making Dean the first British solo female artist to top the albums and singles charts simultaneously since Adele in 2021 with 30 and "Easy on Me". On 22 May 2026, The Art of Loving was certified double platinum by the British Phonographic Industry (BPI) for sales of 600,000 album-equivalent units.

=== United States ===
In the United States, The Art of Loving debuted at number eight on the Billboard 200 chart with 43,000 album-equivalent units, of which 11,000 were pure album sales. In its second week, the album rose to number seven, moving 35,000 units. On the chart dated 17 January 2026, the album rose again to a new peak position of number three. The Art of Loving was only the third album of 2025 to debut in the top ten of the Billboard 200 and reach a new peak in a subsequent week, following Bad Bunny's Debí Tirar Más Fotos and the KPop Demon Hunters soundtrack. On 4 February 2026, The Art of Loving was certified gold by the Recording Industry Association of America (RIAA) for sales of 500,000 album-equivalent units.

=== Oceania ===
==== Australia ====
In Australia, The Art of Loving debuted at number one on the ARIA Albums Chart, the first by the artist to achieve this result, simultaneously occupying the top position in the singles chart with "Man I Need". As of April 24, 2026, the album has spent thirteen non-consecutive weeks at number one on the chart. During the week beginning 12 October 2026, The Art of Loving returned to the top of the ARIA Albums chart for the first time since April, coinciding with Dean being in the country for her Art of Loving Live tour.

==== New Zealand ====
The Art of Loving also debuted at number one on New Zealand's Official Aotearoa Music Charts, spending twenty-three non-consecutive weeks at number one. With the simultaneously number one charting of the single "Man I Need" for twenty-two weeks, Dean now holds the record for the most weeks at one for an album and a related single, surpassing ABBA's 50-year-old record with The Best of ABBA and the song "Fernando".

== Track listing ==
The Art of Loving track listing
No.	Title	Writer(s)	Producer(s)	Length
1.	"The Art of Loving (Intro)"	Olivia Dean; Bastian Langebæk; Max Wolfgang	Langebæk; Nahome^{[a]}; Wolfgang^{[a]}; Tommy Danvers^{[s]}	0:40
2.	"Nice to Each Other"	Dean; Matt Hales	Nahome	3:29
3.	"Lady Lady"	Dean; Hales; Leon Michels; Homer Steinweiss	Nahome; Hales; Michels; Wolfgang^{[v]}	3:29
4.	"Close Up"	Dean; Langebæk; Wolfgang	Nahome; John Ryan; Julian Bunetta; Matt Zara; Langebæk^{[a]}; Wolfgang^{[a]}^{[v]}	3:15
5.	"So Easy (To Fall in Love)"	Dean; Amy Allen; Ryan; Wolfgang	Nahome; Ryan; Bunetta; Allen^{[a]}; Wolfgang^{[v]}	2:49
6.	"Let Alone the One You Love"	Dean; Langebæk; Deschanel Gordon; Wolfgang	Nahome; Ryan; Bunetta; Wolfgang^{[v]}	3:06
7.	"Man I Need"	Dean; Tobias Jesso Jr.; Nahome	Nahome	3:04
8.	"Something Inbetween"	Dean; Jesso; Nolan Lambroza	Nahome; Wolfgang^{[v]}	2:32
9.	"Loud"	Dean; Langebæk; Wolfgang	Langebæk; Wolfgang; Nahome^{[a]}; Danvers^{[s]}	3:04
10.	"Baby Steps"	Dean; Langebæk; Wolfgang	Langebæk; Nahome^{[a]}; Wolfgang^{[a]}	3:17
11.	"A Couple Minutes"	Dean; James Hawkins; Nahome; Louis Ragland; Michael Stafford	Nahome; Danvers^{[s]}	3:32
12.	"I've Seen It"	Dean; Langebæk; Wolfgang	Nahome; Langebæk; Wolfgang	2:06
Total length:				34:23

=== Notes ===
- ^{^[a]} signifies an additional producer.
- ^{^[v]} signifies a vocal producer.
- ^{^[s]} signifies a strings producer.
- "A Couple Minutes" samples "We Had True Love" (1971) by the band Hot Chocolate, written by Louis Ragland and James Hawkins.

== Personnel ==
Credits adapted from Tidal.

=== Musicians ===
- Olivia Dean – vocals (all tracks), background vocals (2, 4, 6, 8, 10, 11), piano (2, 5, 7, 8), keyboards (3, 7), synthesiser (7)
- Zach Nahome – programming (1, 6), synthesiser effects (1, 10, 12), bass (2, 7), drum programming (2), electric guitar (2, 7), lap steel guitar (2), drums (3, 4, 7, 8, 11), percussion (3, 7), synthesiser (7, 8), guitar (10), rhythm programming (11)
- Bastian Langebæk – piano (1, 4), background vocals (4, 10); drum programming, organ, Rhodes, Wurlitzer electronic piano (10); synthesiser (12)
- Rosie Danvers – string arrangement (1, 9, 11)
- Wired Strings (Note: Wired Strings consists of violinists Charis Jenson, Hayley Pomfrett, Jenny Sacha, Kerenza Peacock, Michael Trainor, Patrick Kiernan, Sarah Sexton, and Zahra Benyounes; violists Emma Owens and Meghan Cassidy; and cellists Rosie Danvers and Bryony James.) – strings (1, 9, 11)
- Finn Zeferino-Birchall – bass (2–4, 6, 8), background vocals (2, 4, 6)
- Deschanel Gordon – background vocals (2, 4, 6), keyboards (2, 4), piano (2, 6), keyboard arrangement (6), Wurlitzer electronic piano (6)
- Daniel Rogerson – background vocals (2, 4, 6); acoustic guitar, electric guitar (2, 4); guitar (6, 8)
- Joel Waters – background vocals (2, 4, 6), percussion (2), congas (4), tambourine (6)
- Jermaine Amissah – saxophone (3, 4, 6)
- Joe Bristow – trombone (3, 4, 6)
- Jack Banjo Courtney – trumpet (3, 4, 6)
- Leon Michels – acoustic guitar, bass, guitar, keyboards, percussion (3)
- Homer Steinweiss – drums (3)
- Matt Hales – keyboards, percussion, synthesiser (3)
- John Ryan – programming (4–6); bass, guitar, horn, piano (5)
- Julian Bunetta – drums (4, 5), programming (4, 6), bass (4)
- Matt Zara – programming (4, 6); bass, drums, guitar, piano (4); percussion (6)
- Max Wolfgang – background vocals, organ (4, 10); bass (9, 10), piano (9); electric guitar, percussion (10); guitar, synthesiser (12)
- Mark Rudin – horn (5)
- Eric Hagstrom – drums (6)
- Ollie Clark – guitar (9)
- Michael Stafford – background vocals (11)

=== Technical ===
- Charlie Holmes – mixing
- Simon Francis – mastering
- Jan Trafas – engineering (2, 3), engineering assistance (4, 8)
- Dan Ewins – engineering (2)
- Austin Christy – engineering (3)
- Jeff Gunnell – engineering (4–6)
- Zach Nahome – engineering (4, 6–8, 10, 11)
- John Ryan – engineering (5)
- Max Wolfgang – engineering (6)
- Nick Taylor – strings engineering (1, 9, 11)
- Adele Philips – engineering assistance (2)

== Charts ==
=== Weekly charts ===
Chart performance
Chart (2025–2026)	Peak position
Australian Albums (ARIA)	1
Austrian Albums (Ö3 Austria)	5
Belgian Albums (Ultratop Flanders)	1
Belgian Albums (Ultratop Wallonia)	4
Canadian Albums (Billboard)	3
Croatian International Albums (HDU)	8
Danish Albums (Hitlisten)	2
Dutch Albums (Album Top 100)	1
Finnish Albums (Suomen virallinen lista)	48
French Albums (SNEP)	22
German Albums (Offizielle Top 100)	6
German Pop Albums (Offizielle Top 100)	1
Greek Albums (IFPI)	3
Hungarian Albums (MAHASZ)	30
Icelandic Albums (Tónlistinn)	7
Irish Albums (Official Charts)	1
Italian Albums (FIMI)	39
Japanese Dance & Soul Albums (Oricon)	5
Japanese Hot Albums (Billboard Japan)	58
Japanese Western Albums (Oricon)	15
Lithuanian Albums (AGATA)	9
New Zealand Albums (RMNZ)	1
Nigerian Albums (TurnTable)	96
Norwegian Albums (IFPI Norge)	2
Polish Albums (ZPAV)	9
Portuguese Albums (AFP)	2
Scottish Albums (Official Charts)	1
Spanish Albums (Promusicae)	20
Swedish Albums (Sverigetopplistan)	2
Swiss Albums (Schweizer Hitparade)	4
UK Albums (Official Charts)	1
US Billboard 200	3

=== Monthly charts ===
Monthly chart performance
Chart (2026)	Position
Croatian International Vinyl Albums (HDU)	10

=== Year-end charts ===
Chart (2025)	Position
Australian Albums (ARIA)	9
Austrian Albums (Ö3 Austria)	70
Belgian Albums (Ultratop Flanders)	39
Danish Albums (Hitlisten)	57
Dutch Albums (Album Top 100)	17
French Albums (SNEP)	195
New Zealand Albums (RMNZ)	6
Swedish Albums (Sverigetopplistan)	48
Swiss Albums (Schweizer Hitparade)	54
UK Albums (OCC)	11

== Certifications ==
Certifications
Region	Certification	Certified units/sales
Australia (ARIA)	2× Platinum	140,000^{‡}
Belgium (BRMA)	2× Platinum	40,000^{‡}
Canada (Music Canada)	Platinum	80,000^{‡}
Denmark (IFPI Danmark)	2× Platinum	40,000^{‡}
France (SNEP)	Gold	50,000^{‡}
Italy (FIMI)	Gold	25,000^{‡}
Netherlands (NVPI)	Platinum	37,200^{‡}
New Zealand (RMNZ)	5× Platinum	75,000^{‡}
Norway (IFPI Norway)	2× Platinum	40,000^{‡}
Poland (ZPAV)	Gold	15,000^{‡}
Portugal (AFP)	2× Platinum	14,000^{‡}
Spain (Promusicae)	Gold	20,000^{‡}
Sweden (GLF)	Platinum	30,000^{‡}
Switzerland (IFPI Switzerland)	Gold	10,000^{‡}
United Kingdom (BPI)	2× Platinum	600,000^{‡}
United States (RIAA)	Gold	500,000^{‡}
^{‡} Sales+streaming figures based on certification alone.

== Release history ==
Release dates and formats
Region	Date	Format(s)	Label	Ref.
Various	26 September 2025	Cassette; CD; digital download; LP; streaming	Capitol; Polydor	
