= Nice to Each Other =

2025 single by Olivia Dean

Single by Olivia Dean

from the album The Art of Loving
- B-side: "Nice to Each Other" (live from L'Olympia, Paris)
- Released: 30 May 2025
- Length: 3:29
- Label: Capitol
- Songwriters: Olivia Dean; Matt Hales
- Producer: Zach Nahome

Olivia Dean singles chronology
"It Isn't Perfect But It Might Be" (2025)	"Nice to Each Other" (2025)	"Rein Me In" (2025)

Music video
- "Nice to Each Other" on YouTube

"Nice to Each Other" is a song by English singer-songwriter Olivia Dean. It was released on 30 May 2025 as the lead single from her second studio album, The Art of Loving. It became Dean's first solo top-ten song on the UK singles chart, peaking at number four and certified double platinum by the British Phonographic Industry (BPI).

== Background and composition ==
The song was written by Dean herself with Matt Hales and produced by Zach Nahome. On the release of the single, Dean said about the song was "about the push and pull of exploring your independence in dating. It's about enjoying someone in the present and allowing it to be both light and meaningful. I think this song and video represents a playfulness in me that I'm excited for people to see".

== Music video ==
The music video for "Nice to Each Other" was released on 30 May 2025. It was directed by Jake Erland and shot in one continuous take. At the 2025 UK Music Video Awards, it won for Best Best Pop/R&B/Soul/Jazz Video – Newcomer.

== Live performance ==
Dean performed the song on The Tonight Show Starring Jimmy Fallon in July 2025.

== Critical reception ==
The song received generally positive reviews by music critics. Thomas Smith of Billboard ranked the song as the best track of the album and "an atypical lead single", praising "the opening guitar riff is gently strummed, the drums scarcely noticeable" and Dean "gentle sigh" vocals.

In a positive review for Medium, Ailsya Avriel said Olivia "reflects on how she's enjoying with being single yet open to a connection; [...] love is supposed to be an addition to life, not part of requirement to fill an absence". Shahzaib Hussain of Clash wrote that the song "moves mellifluously between breezy passages of slightly distorted indie brushtrokes, and girl-group harmonies that rise and fall like wafts of smoke".

== Track listing ==
Digital single

1. "Nice to Each Other" – 3:29

7" single

1. "Nice to Each Other" – 3:29
2. "Nice to Each Other" (live from L'Olympia, Paris) – 3:31

== Commercial performance ==
In the United Kingdom, "Nice to Each Other" debuted at No. 28 on the Official Singles Chart, reaching number 10 on 18 July 2025, becoming Dean's first solo top-ten song and second overall on the chart, after her collaboration on "Rein Me In" by Sam Fender. The song peaked at number four on the chart in the album release week.

In the United States, the song debuted at number 97 on the Billboard Hot 100 becoming Dean's second entry on the chart, alongside "So Easy (To Fall in Love)" and "Man I Need"; the song peaked at 74.

In Australia, the song debuted at number 43 on the ARIA Singles Chart, becoming Dean's first entry on the chart. It reached number ten in the week ending on 2 October 2025, becoming Dean's second top ten entry on the chart after "Man I Need". It peaked at eighth place in December 2025.

== Charts ==
=== Weekly charts ===
Weekly chart performance for "Nice to Each Other"
Chart (2025–2026)	Peak position
Australia (ARIA)	8
Canada (Canadian Hot 100)	48
Estonia Airplay (TopHit)	53
Global 200 (Billboard)	52
Ireland (IRMA)	4
Latvia Airplay (LaIPA)	14
Lithuania Airplay (TopHit)	31
Malta Airplay (Radiomonitor)	20
Netherlands (Single Top 100)	26
New Zealand (Recorded Music NZ)	7
Norway (IFPI Norge)	57
Peru Anglo Airplay (Monitor Latino)	13
Poland (Polish Airplay Top 100)	83
Portugal (AFP)	72
Sweden (Sverigetopplistan)	50
Switzerland (Schweizer Hitparade)	84
UK Singles (Official Charts)	4
US Billboard Hot 100	65

=== Monthly charts ===
Monthly chart performance for "Nice to Each Other"
Chart (2025)	Peak position
Estonia Airplay (TopHit)	68
Lithuania Airplay (TopHit)	42

=== Year-end charts ===
Year-end chart performance for "Nice to Each Other"
Chart (2025)	Position
Australia (ARIA)	49
Lithuania Airplay (TopHit)	129
New Zealand (Recorded Music NZ)	36
UK Singles (OCC)	26

== Certifications ==
Certifications for "Nice to Each Other"
Region	Certification	Certified units/sales
Australia (ARIA)	4× Platinum	280,000^{‡}
Belgium (BRMA)	Gold	20,000^{‡}
Brazil (Pro-Música Brasil)	Platinum	40,000^{‡}
Canada (Music Canada)	Platinum	80,000^{‡}
Denmark (IFPI Danmark)	Gold	45,000^{‡}
New Zealand (RMNZ)	3× Platinum	90,000^{‡}
Portugal (AFP)	Gold	12,000^{‡}
Switzerland (IFPI Switzerland)	Gold	15,000^{‡}
United Kingdom (BPI)	2× Platinum	1,200,000^{‡}
United States (RIAA)	Gold	500,000^{‡}
Streaming
Sweden (GLF)	Gold	6,000,000^{†}
^{‡} Sales+streaming figures based on certification alone.^{†} Streaming-only figures based on certification alone.

== Release history ==
Release dates and formats for "Nice to Each Other"
Region	Date	Format	Label(s)	Ref.
Various	30 May 2025	Digital download; streaming	Capitol	
New Zealand	27 June 2025	Radio airplay	Capitol; Universal	
Various	31 October 2025	7" single	Capitol	
