= Baby Steps (Olivia Dean song) =

- 7" single cover

Single by Olivia Dean

from the album The Art of Loving
- B-side: "A Couple Minutes" (A Colors Show)
- Released: 31 July 2026
- Genre: Pop; soul
- Length: 3:17
- Label: Capitol
- Songwriters: Olivia Dean; Bastian Langebæk; Max Wolfgang
- Producers: Langebæk; Zach Nahome; Wolfgang

Olivia Dean singles chronology
"A Couple Minutes" (2026)	"Baby Steps" (2026)

Lyric video
- "Baby Steps" on YouTube

"Baby Steps" is a song by English singer Olivia Dean from her second studio album, The Art of Loving (2025). It was sent to Italian radio on 31 July 2026, as the sixth single from the album.

== Composition and lyrics ==
The song was written by Dean herself, Bastian Langebæk, Max Wolfgang and produced by the latters with Zach Nahome. In an interview on The Rebecca Judd Show on Apple Music 1, Olivia Dean explained that the song draws inspiration from Marvin Gaye, and considered it a continuation of her song "Be My Own Boyfriend" form her 2021 EP Growth.

== Critical reception ==
Thomas Smith of Billboard ranked "Baby Steps" as the second best song from The Art of Loving, appreciating "the same hazy soundscape as Marvin Gaye’s "Inner City Blues (Make Me Wanna Holler)" with "a sweet little melody, is remarkably effective". Alexis Petridis of The Guardian pointed out that the song "offers a particularly gleaming example" of Dean and her writers works on the chorus "polished until it catches the light".

== Charts ==
Chart (2025–2026)	Peak position
Australia (ARIA)	20
Australia Airplay (RCS)	8
Canada Hot 100 (Billboard)	75
Global 200 (Billboard)	187
Italy Airplay (EarOne)	7
New Zealand (Recorded Music NZ)	10
Portugal (AFP)	180
San Marino Airplay (SMRTV Top 50)	15
Sweden Heatseeker (Sverigetopplistan)	16
UK Singles (Official Charts)	30
US Billboard Hot 100	91

== Certifications ==
Certifications for "Baby Steps"
Region	Certification	Certified units/sales
Australia (ARIA)	2× Platinum	140,000^{‡}
Brazil (Pro-Música Brasil)	Gold	20,000^{‡}
New Zealand (RMNZ)	2× Platinum	60,000^{‡}
United Kingdom (BPI)	Platinum	600,000^{‡}
^{‡} Sales+streaming figures based on certification alone.

== Release history ==
Release dates and formats for "Baby Steps"
Region	Date	Format	Label(s)	Ref.
Various	26 September 2025	Digital download; streaming	Capitol	
United Kingdom	24 April 2026	7" single	Capitol	
Ireland	24 April 2026	7" single	Capitol	
Italy	31 July 2026	Contemporary hit radio	EMI	
United States	6 August 2026	7" single	Island	
