= It Isn't Perfect But It Might Be =

2025 single by Olivia Dean

Single by Olivia Dean

from the album Bridget Jones: Mad About the Boy
- Released: 11 February 2025
- Length: 3:36
- Label: Capitol
- Songwriters: Olivia Dean; Matt Hales
- Producers: Matt Hales; Zach Nahome

Olivia Dean singles chronology
"Touching Toes" (2024)	"It Isn't Perfect But It Might Be" (2025)	"Nice to Each Other" (2025)

"It Isn't Perfect But It Might Be" is a song by English singer-songwriter Olivia Dean, released in February 2025 as the lead single and end credits music from the Bridget Jones: Mad About the Boy soundtrack. It reached number 36 on the UK singles chart.

Upon release, Dean said: "I've always loved the Bridget Jones films, they're timeless classics. After seeing Mad About the Boy I was so moved by the journey we've watched Bridget go on over the years. 'It Isn't Perfect But It Might Be' is about giving yourself permission to love again after grief, and trusting that things might just work out after all."

A limited edition heart-shaped vinyl was released in April 2025.

== Critical reception ==
Daisy Carter from DIY magazine called it "a slinkily romantic yet refreshingly realistic love ballad."

== Track listing ==
Digital single

1. "It Isn't Perfect But It Might Be" – 3:36

Vinyl single

1. "It Isn't Perfect But It Might Be" – 3:36
2. "It Isn't Perfect But It Might Be" (Wurli Version) – 2:06

== Charts ==
Chart performance for "It Isn't Perfect But It Might Be"
Chart (2025)	Peak position
Ireland (IRMA)	81
Lithuania Airplay (TopHit)	80
UK Singles (OCC)	36
UK Physical Singles (OCC)	2

== Certifications ==
Certifications for "It Isn't Perfect But It Might Be"
Region	Certification	Certified units/sales
New Zealand (RMNZ)	Platinum	30,000^{‡}
United Kingdom (BPI)	Gold	400,000^{‡}
^{‡} Sales+streaming figures based on certification alone.
