= Lady Lady (song) =

2025 single by Olivia Dean

Single by Olivia Dean

from the album The Art of Loving
- Released: 11 July 2025
- Length: 3:29
- Label: Capitol
- Songwriters: Olivia Dean; Matt Hales; Leon Michels; Homer Steinweiss
- Producers: Matt Hales; Leon Michels; Zach Nahome

Olivia Dean singles chronology
"Rein Me In" (2025)	"Lady Lady" (2025)	"Man I Need" (2025)

Music video
- "Lady Lady" on YouTube

"Lady Lady" is a song by English singer-songwriter Olivia Dean, released on 11 July 2025 as the second single from her second studio album, The Art of Loving. It reached number 38 on the UK singles chart.

== Composition ==
The song, written by Dean with Matt Hales, Leon Michels, Homer Steinweiss, was described for its meaning by the singer herself:

"["Lady Lady"] is a song about the universe, mother nature and accepting and trusting in the plan that she has for you. It’s about the feeling of having to change just as you’re getting used to a version of yourself. This song reminds me of the power we hold as women, I think it feels like peace"

== Critical reception ==
Aswan Magumbe from New Wave Magazine called the single "soul-stirring", writing: "Tender yet empowering, 'Lady Lady' is a peaceful pondering on womanhood, surrender, and evolution." Chancey Stefanos from Ones to Watch said: "Dean's emotional clarity, stunning vocals and undeniable warmth are as present as ever, while her unbridled confidence and sense of self flow through the track."

Louella Venus from The Indiependent said: "Her new single feels sun kissed and orange. It touches on how growing out of old ways is still growth, and often leads to the greater good seen in the lyrics 'growing on growing into it, and it's all going on'. Her stacked vocals in the chorus of the song grounds her sound. This responds to her message of alignment perfectly."

== Music video ==
The official music video, directed by Jake Erland, was published published alongside the single on the singer's YouTube channel.

== Charts ==
=== Weekly charts ===
Weekly chart performance
Chart (2025–2026)	Peak position
Australia (ARIA)	41
Ireland (IRMA)	70
Lithuania Airplay (TopHit)	67
New Zealand (Recorded Music NZ)	15
UK Singles (OCC)	38
US Bubbling Under Hot 100 (Billboard)	9
Venezuela Anglo Airplay (Monitor Latino)	9

=== Monthly charts ===
Monthly chart performance
Chart (2025)	Peak position
Lithuania Airplay (TopHit)	83

== Certifications ==
Certifications for "Lady Lady"
Region	Certification	Certified units/sales
Australia (ARIA)	Platinum	70,000^{‡}
Brazil (Pro-Música Brasil)	Gold	20,000^{‡}
New Zealand (RMNZ)	Platinum	30,000^{‡}
United Kingdom (BPI)	Gold	400,000^{‡}
^{‡} Sales+streaming figures based on certification alone.
