= OK Love You Bye =

2019 single by Olivia Dean

Single by Olivia Dean

from the EP OK Love You Bye
- Released: 22 November 2019
- Length: 2:34
- Label: AMF
- Songwriters: Olivia Dean; Oli Bayston
- Producer: Oli Bayston

Olivia Dean singles chronology
"Password Change" (2019)	"OK Love You Bye" (2019)	"Just for You" (2019)

Music video
- "Ok Love You Bye" on YouTube

"OK Love You Bye" is a song by English singer-songwriter Olivia Dean, released in November 2019 as the third and final single from Dean's debut EP of the same name. It was certified gold in the United Kingdom in 2025.

Upon release, Dean said: "It is supposed to feel like the morning after an argument, but reflecting on it more positively and being like 'there's things you did wrong, there's things I did wrong, but we can get through it'."

== Critical reception ==
Kayleigh Watson from The Line of Best Fit said "Smattered with brass and lilting melodies, Dean's signature dulcet tones imbue 'OK Love You Bye' with an earnest relatability and maturity that belies her youthful self-awareness."

== Track listing of the EP ==
OK Love You Bye EP track listing
No.	Title	Length
1.	"Password Change"	3:26
2.	"OK Love You Bye"	2:34
3.	"Reason to Stay"	3:18
4.	"White Trainers" (demo)	2:42
Total length:		12:01

== Charts ==
Chart performance for "OK Love You Bye"
Chart (2025–2026)	Peak position
Australia (ARIA)	51
Ireland (IRMA)	13
Netherlands (Single Tip)	3
Sweden Heatseeker (Sverigetopplistan)	19

== Certifications ==
Certifications for "OK Love You Bye"
Region	Certification	Certified units/sales
Australia (ARIA)	Platinum	70,000^{‡}
Denmark (IFPI Danmark)	Gold	45,000^{‡}
New Zealand (RMNZ)	2× Platinum	60,000^{‡}
United Kingdom (BPI)	Platinum	600,000^{‡}
^{‡} Sales+streaming figures based on certification alone.
