= Rein Me In =

2025 single by Sam Fender and Olivia Dean

- Cover art for the re-recorded duet version

Single by Sam Fender and Olivia Dean

from the album People Watching (Deluxe)
- Released: 20 June 2025
- Genre: Heartland rock
- Length: 5:37
- Label: Polydor
- Songwriters: Sam Fender; Olivia Dean; Max Wolfgang
- Producers: Sam Fender; Adam Granduciel; Markus Dravs; Joe Atkinson; Dean Thompson

Sam Fender singles chronology
"Tyrants" (2025)	"Rein Me In" (2025)	"Talk to You" (2025)

Olivia Dean singles chronology
"Nice to Each Other" (2025)	"Rein Me In" (2025)	"Lady Lady" (2025)

Music video
- "Rein Me In" on YouTube

"Rein Me In" is a song by English singer-songwriters Sam Fender and Olivia Dean. It is a re-recorded duet version of a song from Fender's third studio album People Watching (2025), as the original features only Fender. It was released on 20 June 2025 as the sixth single from the album.

"Rein Me In" became Fender's first song to reach number-one on the UK Singles Chart in February 2026; it subsequently spent 23 non-consecutive weeks at number one, becoming the longest-running number-one single in UK music history. It also won the Brit Award for Song of the Year. Outside the United Kingdom, "Rein Me In" also topped the charts in Australia, Ireland and New Zealand. It became Fender's first entry on the Billboard Hot 100, peaking at number 45.

== Background and release ==
"Rein Me In" was originally included as the eighth track of Fender's third studio album, People Watching. The song was written by Fender himself and produced with Adam Granduciel, Markus Dravs, Joe Atkinson and Dean Thompson. "Rein Me In" is about self-sabotage in romantic relationships. In the song, Fender "is too afraid to be 'reined in' by love and instead rejects anyone who gets too close". The lyrics are set over a jazzy instrumental that includes piano and saxophone.

Fender debuted the new version during a 6 June 2025 show at London Stadium, bringing Dean on stage to perform it. Videos of the performance went viral. The two performed the version again on 15 June at Fender's St. James' Park concert. Fender announced the official release of the new version on 20 June, stating that Dean "added a female perspective to 'Rein Me In,' and I think it's all the better for it". Dean said that "Rein Me In" was her favourite song from the album.

== Critical reception ==
The original version of "Rein Me In" received praise from music critics. Sarah Bea Milner of Screen Rant called the song "catchy" and "earnest", writing that "Fender's mumblecore tenor works particularly well against bright guitar and solid bass groove." Brianna Corrine of Atwood Magazine noted that it "explores a different, lighter side of Fender’s capabilities" compared to the rest of the album. Writing for Billboard, Thomas Smith and Sophie Williams described the song as a "starkly arranged epic [...] with a vocal performance that delivers the type of passion and intensity that, the closer you listen, you can feel in your chest".

The Olivia Dean version was also well-received by critics. Nick Levine of the Official Charts called it a "stellar collaboration". Blunt Magazine's Jake Fitzpatrick wrote that the "stormy, tender and anthemic" version was "a love letter to the kind of songwriting that knows when to burn slow". Rolling Stone UK included the song in their weekly Hot New Songs playlist.

== Commercial performance ==
In the United Kingdom, "Rein Me In" debuted at number 86 on the UK singles chart, climbing to number six the following week, becoming Fender's fourth top-ten song and Dean's second consecutive top-ten song after "Nice to Each Other". On 26 February 2026, the song peaked at number one at its thirty-fifth week on the chart, breaking the record for the most consecutive weeks in the top 40 before reaching number one, previously held by Ed Sheeran's "Thinking Out Loud" with nineteen weeks. It became Fender's first and Dean's second number-one song on the chart. The song topped the chart for 23 non-consecutive weeks, becoming the longest-running male-female duet at number one, overtaking Rihanna and Jay-Z's "Umbrella", the longest-running number one of the 2020s, overtaking Alex Warren's "Ordinary", the longest-running number one by a British act, breaking a 32-year-long record previously held by Wet Wet Wet's "Love Is All Around", and ultimately becoming the longest-running number-one single in UK music history, surpassing the 73-year long record of 18 non-consecutive weeks set by Frankie Laine's "I Believe" in 1953. The song was named the UK's 2026 song of the summer.

In Ireland, "Rein Me In" debuted at number 16 in its opening week. The song remained in the top 40 for thirty-three consecutive weeks before rising to number one in the week commencing 13 February 2026, becoming Fender's first and Dean's second Irish number one single. The song subsequently spent 18 non-consecutive weeks at number one in Ireland, tying Bill Whelan's "Riverdance" (1994) for the longest-running number-one single in Irish music history.

In Australia, the song reached the top ten on the ARIA Singles Chart on 20 February 2026. It became Fender's first top-ten song on the chart and gave Dean three songs in the top ten simultaneously, with "Man I Need" at number one and "So Easy (To Fall in Love)" at number two. On 20 March 2026, "Rein Me In" peaked at number two, behind Dean's "Man I Need". On 4 April 2026, the song reached the top of the charts, replacing "Man I Need", which dropped to second place, becoming Dean's second number-one hit and Fender's first on the Australian chart.

== Music video ==
A music video directed by Daniel Broadley was released alongside the duet version on 20 June. It shows footage of Fender and Dean during their debut performance of the song on 6 June and at St James’s Park on 15 June.

== Track listings ==
Digital single

1. "Rein Me In" – 5:39

Digital single

1. "Rein Me In" (live at London Stadium / extended version) – 6:53
2. "Rein Me In" (edit) – 4:03
3. "Rein Me In" (duet version) – 5:39
4. "Rein Me In" (solo) – 5:39

7" single

1. "Rein Me In" – 5:39
2. "Rein Me In" (live at London Stadium / extended version) – 6:53

== Charts ==
=== Weekly charts ===
Weekly chart performance for "Rein Me In"
Chart (2025–2026)	Peak position
Australia (ARIA)	1
Australia Airplay (RCS)	5
Belgium (Ultratop 50 Flanders)	37
Brazil Airplay (Crowley)	121
Canada Hot 100 (Billboard)	35
Canada Modern Rock (Billboard Canada)	27
Colombia Anglo Airplay (Monitor Latino)	18
Croatia International Airplay (Top lista)	44
Finland Airplay (Radiosoittolista)	95
Germany Airplay (BVMI)	94
Global 200 (Billboard)	32
Ireland (IRMA)	1
Italy Airplay (EarOne)	72
Latvia Airplay (LaIPA)	19
Lithuania Airplay (TopHit)	27
Malta Airplay (Radiomonitor)	7
Netherlands (Dutch Top 40)	5
Netherlands (Single Top 100)	3
New Zealand (Recorded Music NZ)	1
New Zealand Airplay (RCS)	1
Norway (VG-lista)	11
Poland Airplay (OLiS)	27
Portugal (AFP)	195
South Africa Airplay (TOSAC)	7
Sweden (Sverigetopplistan)	25
UK Singles (Official Charts)	1
US Billboard Hot 100	45
US Adult Pop Airplay (Billboard)	31
US Hot Rock & Alternative Songs (Billboard)	10
US Rock & Alternative Airplay (Billboard)	16

=== Monthly charts ===
Monthly chart performance for "Rein Me In"
Chart (2026)	Peak position
Lithuania Airplay (TopHit)	30

=== Year-end charts ===
Year-end chart performance for "Rein Me In"
Chart (2025)	Position
UK Singles (OCC)	38

== Certifications ==
Certifications for "Rein Me In"
Region	Certification	Certified units/sales
Australia (ARIA)	2× Platinum	140,000^{‡}
Canada (Music Canada)	Platinum	80,000^{‡}
Denmark (IFPI Danmark)	Gold	45,000^{‡}
New Zealand (RMNZ)	4× Platinum	120,000^{‡}
Portugal (AFP)	Gold	12,000^{‡}
United Kingdom (BPI)	4× Platinum	2,400,000^{‡}
United States (RIAA)	Platinum	1,000,000^{‡}
^{‡} Sales+streaming figures based on certification alone.

== Release history ==
Release dates and formats for "Rein Me In"
Region	Date	Version	Format	Label(s)	Ref.
Various	20 June 2025	Original	Digital download; streaming	Polydor	
Various	27 June 2025	Live at London Stadium	Digital download; streaming	Polydor	
Italy	29 August 2025	Original	Contemporary hit radio	EMI	
United Kingdom	28 November 2025	Original; Live at London Stadium	7" single	Polydor	
United Kingdom	27 February 2026	Original; Live at London Stadium	7" single (North Shields Reissue)	Polydor	
United Kingdom	19 June 2026	Original; Live at London Stadium	Pink 7" single (North Shields Reissue)	Polydor	
