= Olivia Dean =

British singer (born 1999)

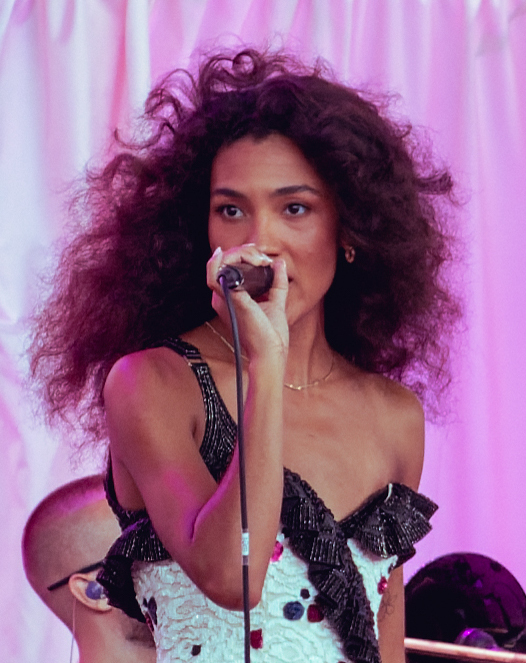
- Dean performing at BST Hyde Park in 2025
- Born: Olivia Lauryn Dean; Tottenham, London, England
- Education: BRIT School
- Occupations: Singer; songwriter
- Years active: 2017–present
- Works: Discography
- Relatives: Ashley Walters (cousin)
- Musical career
- Origin: Highams Park, East London
- Genres: R&B; pop; soul; neo soul; jazz
- Instruments: Vocals; piano; guitar; harmonica
- Labels: AMF; Virgin EMI; EMI; Capitol; Polydor
- Website: oliviadeano.com

Olivia Lauryn Dean is an English singer and songwriter. Her accolades include four Brit Awards and a Grammy Award. She gained recognition in 2019 for her single "OK Love You Bye".

Dean signed with AMF Records and Virgin EMI Records in 2019 after her self-released song "Reason to Stay" went viral. Her debut album, Messy (2023), included her breakout single "Dive" and earned a nomination for the Mercury Prize. Her second album, The Art of Loving (2025), topped the UK Albums Chart and earned her the Grammy Award for Best New Artist in 2026. The album produced several successful singles, including "Nice to Each Other", "So Easy (To Fall in Love)", and her first UK number-one single, "Man I Need". Her collaboration with Sam Fender, "Rein Me In", became the longest-running number-one in UK chart history and won the Brit Award for Song of the Year.

== Early life and education ==
Dean was born in Tottenham, North London. Her father is English and her mother Christine is a lawyer of Jamaican and Guyanese descent. In 2020, her mother became the deputy leader of the Women's Equality Party, making her the first Black deputy leader of a political party in Europe. Her maternal grandmother, Carmen, emigrated to the United Kingdom from Guyana aged 18 as part of the Windrush generation. Carmen was "quite young" when she gave birth to Dean's mother. In February 2026, when she won the Grammy Award for Best New Artist, Dean dedicated her acceptance speech to Carmen and advocated for the benefits of immigrants, and also paid homage to her in a song named "Carmen". She has a younger brother. Actor Ashley Walters, who was a rapper in So Solid Crew, is her cousin.

Dean grew up in Highams Park in east London, a suburban district between Chingford and Walthamstow, where she has said she sometimes "felt quite 'other'" for being mixed-race. In an interview with Time Out, she described Highams Park as being "like a village", with "one primary school, two pubs, and a big Tesco". She often uses Walthamstow as shorthand for where she grew up, explaining: “I was born in Tottenham and raised in Highams Park, but I usually just say Walthamstow because people don’t know where that is. It’s on the cusp of Essex, basically. I’m an East London girl through and through.” She has said she "didn't love growing up there", "felt quite different to everybody else", and was one of few black girls in her primary school, which made her want to leave the area.

Her father often listened to music and they would dance around the kitchen together. Her father introduced her to the music of Carole King and Al Green, while her mother introduced her to the music of Jill Scott, Angie Stone, and Lauryn Hill; she received her middle name Lauryn after Hill. One of the first CDs that she owned was a single of "A Moment Like This" (2006) by Leona Lewis.

In primary school, she sang "Tomorrow" from the musical Annie in a competition. So nervous at first that she turned her back to the audience, she cried while singing but still won second place. By the age of eight, she knew that she wanted to be a singer, although she was quite shy. At the urging of her mother, she took musical theatre lessons in a Saturday school and participated in a gospel choir.

At the age of fifteen, she was accepted by BRIT School, a highly selective but free performing arts school in Croydon. She travelled an hour and 45 minutes each way to attend, always falling asleep on the commute. In 2020, she said that attending BRIT School was "the best thing I ever did". She initially studied musical theatre, but switched to songwriting for her final two years and convinced her mother to buy her a second-hand piano. Her inspiration for songwriting and performing was ignited at the age of seventeen when a teacher at the school played, on the projector, a live version of Paul Simon singing "Diamonds on the Soles of Her Shoes" with Ladysmith Black Mambazo, which she says "just sparked something". At BRIT School, she became close friends with classmates Rachel Chinouriri and Raye.

== Career ==
=== 2017–2024: Career beginnings and Messy ===
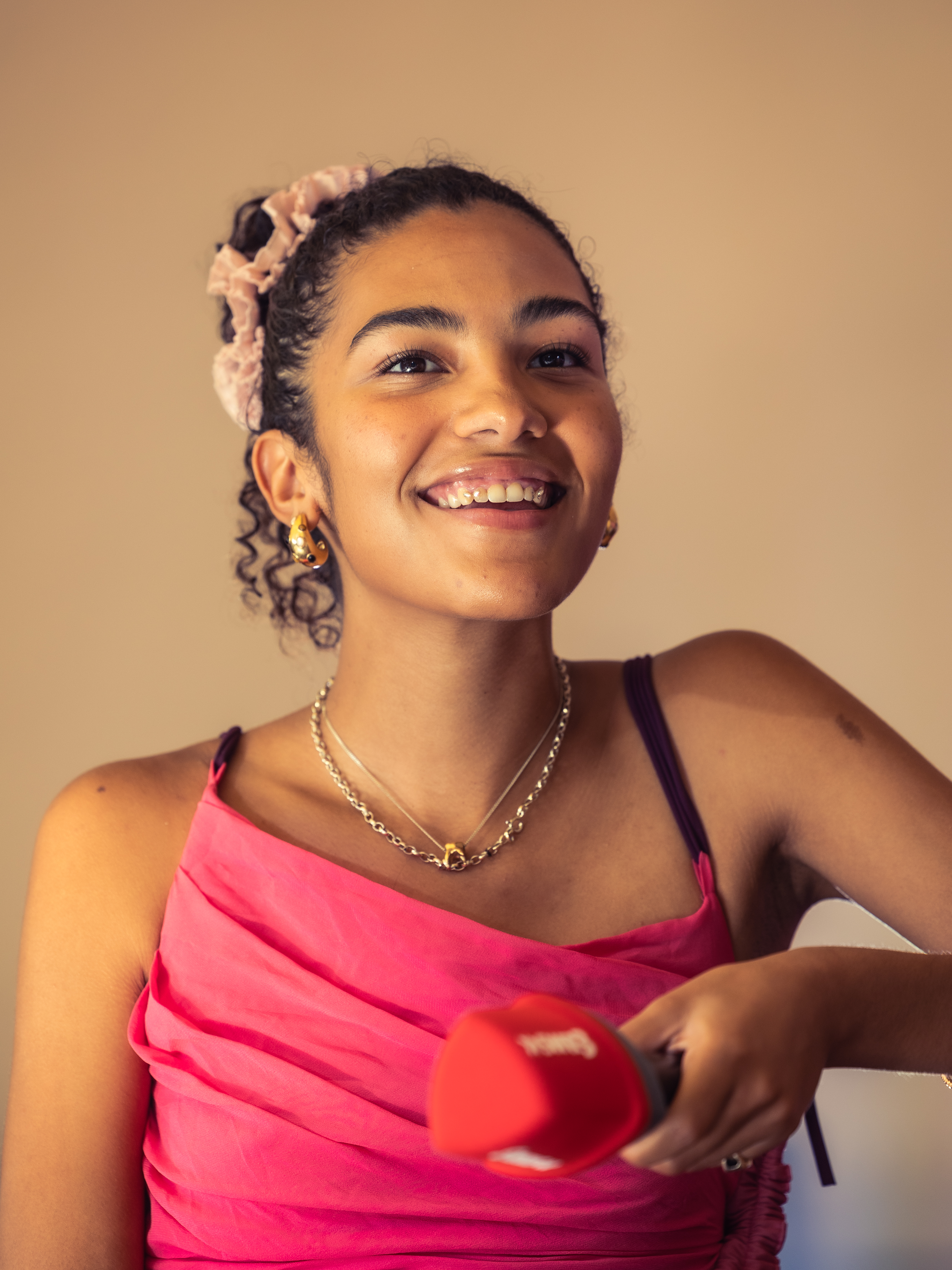
Olivia Dean at the New Pop Festival in 2023

Dean began writing songs at age 16, teaching herself the guitar and piano. At age 17, she put on street performances on the South Bank, barely making enough money to buy dinner. Dean performed at her high school graduation concert, which attracted the attention of Emily Braham of Yo&Co, whom she hired as her manager. Braham got Dean into an audition with Rudimental, who hired Dean as a backing vocalist. Dean has said that she was not good in the position as she often sang the melody instead of the harmony. In 2017, Dean performed her first show at the Sziget Festival in Hungary before a crowd of 16,000. In August 2018, upon the death of Aretha Franklin, Dean uploaded to YouTube a cover version of "(You Make Me Feel Like) A Natural Woman", written by Carole King and Gerry Goffin and performed by Franklin, which she stated was her favourite song of all time.

In October 2018, Dean self-released her debut single, "Reason to Stay". She was featured on Rudimental's single "Adrenaline" on the album Toast to Our Differences, released in January 2019. In October 2019, she released the single "Password Change". After "Reason to Stay" was streamed millions of times, she was offered and signed a recording contract with AMF Records and Virgin EMI Records. In November 2019, she released the single "OK Love You Bye" as well as her debut EP, the four-song OK Love You Bye, via the label. It was recorded in a converted pub in East London. That year, she was chosen as BBC Introducing London's Featured Artist of the Week and performed at a BBC Introducing show at The Lexington, Islington.

In 2020, during the COVID-19 lockdowns, Dean moved in with her parents in Walthamstow and focused on her social media. She worked with Eg White on the singles "Crosswords" and "What Am I Gonna Do on Sundays?". In August 2020, during the COVID-19 pandemic, in what she called the "From Me to You" tour, sponsored by Clarks, Dean travelled around the UK in a bright yellow truck painted with her name, a "flower power" daisy, and a Black Lives Matter logo, delivering open-air performances to fans and passers-by. Some of the shows had only five or 10 attendees. Her second EP, What Am I Gonna Do on Sundays?, was released in December 2020.

In April 2021, she was named the breakthrough artist of the year by Amazon Music. That month, she played at The Jazz Cafe in her first performance after the COVID-19 lockdowns; a video of the performance became a viral video on TikTok. In July 2021, she released the EP, Growth. In August 2021, Dean performed six concerts at venues in southern England as part of the Revive Live Tour organised by Music Venue Trust and funded by The National Lottery to help revive live music venues after the COVID-19 pandemic. In November 2021, Dean recorded a version of Nat King Cole's "The Christmas Song" for Amazon's Christmas Originals line-up, which charted at number 19 on the UK singles chart. In May 2023, she performed at BBC Radio 1's Big Weekend. She also made her television debut by performing her single "Dive" on Later... with Jools Holland. In June 2023, she released her debut full-length album, Messy, which was nominated for a Mercury Prize.

In November 2023, Dean was selected as BBC Music Introducing Artist of the Year. Dean performed at Glastonbury Festival 2024; performing at the festival had been a childhood dream of hers. In June 2024, she released the single "Time". She released a cover of The Supremes's "You Can't Hurry Love", recorded at Jools' Annual Hootenanny, in October 2024. In November, she released another single, "Touching Toes".

=== 2025–present: Breakthrough with The Art of Loving ===
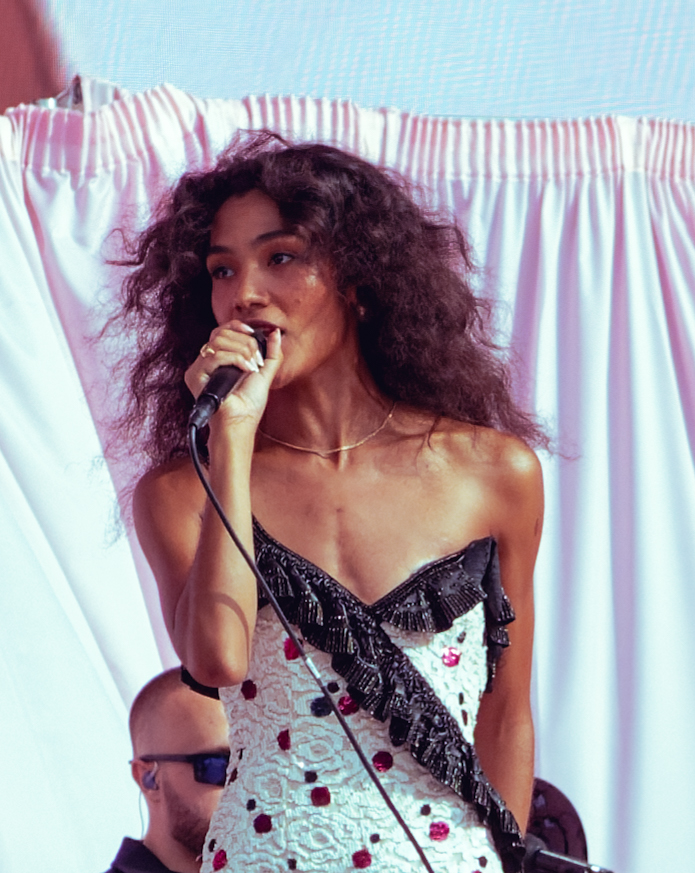
Dean at the BST Hyde Park in 2025

Dean released the single "It Isn't Perfect But It Might Be" for the romantic comedy film Bridget Jones: Mad About the Boy (2025). Also in February 2025, Dean performed on all six dates of Laneway Festival, with shows in Auckland, Brisbane, Sydney, Melbourne, and Perth, her first shows in Australia and New Zealand. Dean supported Sam Fender on selected dates of Fender's People Watching Tour in June and August 2025, including shows at London Stadium and St James' Park, and collaborated with Fender on a duet version of "Rein Me In", released in June. Dean performed a secret set at Glastonbury Festival 2025.

Her second album, The Art of Loving, was released in September 2025. The album included the singles "Nice to Each Other", "Lady Lady", "Man I Need", "So Easy (To Fall in Love)", "A Couple Minutes", and "Baby Steps". Dean said that her song "Man I Need" almost wasn't released as a single, because she wasn't sure it fit the album. All the singles charted; "Man I Need" became her first number 1 on the UK singles chart, reached number 2 on the Billboard Hot 100, and number 4 on the Billboard Global 200. She became the first female solo artist to simultaneously have four singles in the Top 10 of the UK singles chart. In 2025, Dean was the musical guest on Saturday Night Live opposite Glenn Powell as host for the November 16 episode. She performed songs from her album The Art of Loving including "Man I Need" and "Let Alone the One You Love".

In November 2025, Dean also announced The Art of Loving Live tour with stops in 14 cities in the United States and 15 cities in Europe. However, once tickets went on sale on Ticketmaster, fans encountered online queues of thousands of people and expensive ticket resales. Dean criticised Ticketmaster and other primary ticket outlets such as Live Nation, AXS, and Anschutz Entertainment Group for allowing tickets to The Art of Loving Live tour to be re-sold by scalpers at high markups. Dean referred to Ticketmaster as providing a "disgusting service" and said that the secondary ticketing market was "exploitative and unregulated". As a result of the controversy, Ticketmaster and AXS capped resale ticket prices for Dean's tour and provided refunds for fans that paid above face value; Dean said that she was excited to see "real people" at her shows.

Olivia Dean performing in Sydney, Australia in October 2026.

In January 2026, Billboard named Dean Rookie of the Year. That month, she performed "So Easy (To Fall in Love)" on The Graham Norton Show. The following month, her duet with Sam Fender, "Rein Me In", became Dean's second UK number 1 after 35 weeks in the UK Top 40. As of July 2026, the song had spent 23 weeks at number 1 on the chart, becoming the longest-running number 1 by a British act, breaking a thirty-two-year-long record previously held by Wet Wet Wet's "Love Is All Around", and also becoming the longest-running number 1 single of all time, surpassing the 73-year-old record of 18 non-consecutive weeks set by Frankie Laine's "I Believe" in 1953. In February 2026, Dean won four awards at the 46th Brit Awards ceremony. That same month, she won the Grammy Award for Best New Artist.

In August of 2026, Larisha Paul of Rolling Stone reviewed her concert performance at Madison Square Garden in New York City writing, "By the final stretch of the set, it didn’t feel too soon to say Dean is the new classic. She fits perfectly in this rarefied space between having already amassed a certain prestige, while still only just beginning." She was nominated for six Grammy Awards including nominations for Album of the Year for The Art of Loving Record of the Year, and Song of the Year for "Man I Need" at the 69th Annual Grammy Awards.

== Artistry and influences ==
Dean has cited Amy Winehouse, Prince, Michael Jackson, Carole King, Sade Adu, Lauryn Hill, Beyoncé, Aretha Franklin, Al Green, Whitney Houston, Joni Mitchell, Raye, Paul Simon, Jill Scott, JLS, Leona Lewis, Angie Stone, and the Supremes as inspirations. Her music is described as "devastating heartbreak ballads and sing-along self-love anthems". In additional to musical influences, Dean has also referenced literary influences in her exploration of love, such as author bell hooks and her book All About Love.

== Other ventures ==
Dean is a brand ambassador for Chanel. She also leads an advertising campaign for Burberry Her fragrance. In March 2026, Dean was announced as Hourglass's Global Brand Partner.

== Personal life ==
Dean has been in a relationship with American drummer Eddie Burns, a band member for Clairo, since April 2025. She is a supporter of West Ham United F.C. and attended many games at Upton Park with her father, a season ticket holder, during her childhood. On 1 October 2026, Mattie Music Group filed a lawsuit claiming that Dean's song "I've Seen It" had copied the Grover Washington Jr. and Bill Withers 1981 single, "Just the Two of Us".

== Filmography ==
=== Film ===
| Year | Title | Role | Notes | Ref. |
|---|---|---|---|---|
| 2025 | Sam Fender – Live at London Stadium | Herself | Concert film | |

=== Television ===
| Year | Title | Role | Note |
|---|---|---|---|
| 2025 | Saturday Night Live | Herself | Episode; "Glen Powell/Olivia Dean" |

== Discography ==
Studio albums

- Messy (2023)
- The Art of Loving (2025)

== Tours ==
Headlining

- From Me To You (2020)
- 2023 UK And Europe Headline Tour
- UK & Europe Messy Tour (2023)
- Across the Atlantic Tour (2025)
- The Art of Loving Live (2026)

Opening act

- Jordan Rakei – What We Call Life Tour (2022)
- Sam Fender – People Watching Tour (2024)
- Sabrina Carpenter – Short n' Sweet Tour (2025)

== Awards and nominations ==
| Award | Year | Category | Nominee(s) / Work(s) | Result | Ref. |
|---|---|---|---|---|---|
| American Music Awards | 2026 | New Artist of the Year | Herself | Nominated | |
| American Music Awards | 2026 | Best Female Pop Artist | Herself | Nominated | |
| American Music Awards | 2026 | Song of the Year | "Man I Need" | Nominated | |
| American Music Awards | 2026 | Best Pop Song | "Man I Need" | Nominated | |
| American Music Awards | 2026 | Album of the Year | The Art of Loving | Nominated | |
| American Music Awards | 2026 | Breakthrough Album of the Year | The Art of Loving | Nominated | |
| American Music Awards | 2026 | Best Pop Album | The Art of Loving | Nominated | |
| ARIA Music Awards | 2026 | Most Popular International Artist | Herself | Nominated | |
| BBC Music Sound of... | 2024 | Sound of 2024 | Herself | Runner-up | |
| BET Awards | 2026 | Best Female R&B/Pop Artist | Herself | Nominated | |
| BET Awards | 2026 | Best New Artist | Herself | Won | |
| BET Awards | 2026 | BET Her Award | "Lady Lady" | Nominated | |
| BET Awards | 2026 | Viewer's Choice Award | "Man I Need" | Nominated | |
| BreakTudo Awards | 2026 | International Revelation | Herself | Pending | |
| Brit Awards | 2024 | Best Pop Act | Herself | Nominated | |
| Brit Awards | 2024 | British Artist of the Year | Herself | Nominated | |
| Brit Awards | 2024 | Best New Artist | Herself | Nominated | |
| Brit Awards | 2026 | British Artist of the Year | Herself | Won | |
| Brit Awards | 2026 | Best Pop Act | Herself | Won | |
| Brit Awards | 2026 | British Album of the Year | The Art of Loving | Won | |
| Brit Awards | 2026 | Song of the Year | "Man I Need" | Nominated | |
| Brit Awards | 2026 | Song of the Year | "Rein Me In" (with Sam Fender) | Won | |
| Filipino Music Awards | 2026 | International Artist – People’s Choice Awards | Herself | Nominated | |
| Grammy Awards | 2026 | Best New Artist | Herself | Won | |
| Grammy Awards | 2027 | Record of the Year | "Man I Need" | Pending | |
| Grammy Awards | 2027 | Song of the Year | "Man I Need" | Pending | |
| Grammy Awards | 2027 | Best Pop Solo Performance | "Man I Need" | Pending | |
| Grammy Awards | 2027 | Album of the Year | The Art of Loving | Pending | |
| Grammy Awards | 2027 | Best Pop Vocal Album | The Art of Loving | Pending | |
| Grammy Awards | 2027 | Best Traditional Pop Vocal Performance | "A Couple Minutes" | Pending | |
| iHeartRadio Music Awards | 2026 | Best Lyrics | "Man I Need" | Nominated | |
| Ivor Novello Awards | 2026 | Most Performed Work | "Man I Need" | Nominated | |
| Ivor Novello Awards | 2026 | Best Album | The Art of Loving | Nominated | |
| Los 40 Music Awards | 2026 | Best International Album | The Art of Loving | Won | |
| Los 40 Music Awards | 2026 | Best International Song | "Man I Need" | Nominated | |
| Los 40 Music Awards | 2026 | Best International Artist | Herself | Won | |
| Mercury Prize | 2023 | Album of the Year | Messy | Shortlisted | |
| Mercury Prize | 2026 | Album of the Year | The Art of Loving | Shortlisted | |
| MTV Video Music Awards | 2026 | Song of the Year | "Man I Need" | Nominated | |
| MTV Video Music Awards | 2026 | Song of Summer | "So Easy (To Fall in Love)" | Nominated | |
| MTV Video Music Awards | 2026 | Best Album | The Art of Loving | Nominated | |
| Music Producers Guild Awards | 2026 | Album of the Year | The Art of Loving | Won | |
| MOBO Awards | 2026 | Album of the Year | The Art of Loving | Won | |
| MOBO Awards | 2026 | Song of the Year | "Man I Need" | Won | |
| MOBO Awards | 2026 | Best Female Act | Herself | Won | |
| MOBO Awards | 2026 | Best R&B Soul Act | Herself | Nominated | |
| Nickelodeon Kids' Choice Awards | 2026 | Favorite Viral Song | "Man I Need" | Won | |
| Nickelodeon Kids' Choice Awards | 2026 | Favorite Female Breakout Artist/Group | Herself | Nominated | |
| Nickelodeon Kids' Choice Awards | 2026 | Favorite Global Music Star | Herself | Nominated | |
| NRJ Music Awards | 2026 | International Revelation of the Year | Herself | Nominated | |
| Pollstar Awards | 2026 | Support or Special Guest of the Year | Short n' Sweet Tour | Won | |
| Rolling Stone UK Awards | 2023 | The Breakthrough Award | Herself | Nominated | |
| Rolling Stone UK Awards | 2025 | The Artist Award | Herself | Nominated | |
| Rolling Stone UK Awards | 2026 | The Song of the Year Award | "Rein Me In" (with Sam Fender) | Nominated | |
| Soul Train Music Awards | 2026 | R&B/Soul Song Of The Year | "Man I Need" | Pending | |
| UK Music Video Awards | 2020 | Best R&B / Soul Video – UK | "Password Change" | Nominated | |
| UK Music Video Awards | 2024 | Best R&B / Soul Video – UK | "Time" | Nominated | |
| UK Music Video Awards | 2025 | Best Pop / R&B / Soul / Jazz Video – Newcomer | "Nice to Each Other" | Won | |
| UK Music Video Awards | 2026 | Best Pop Video – UK | "So Easy (To Fall In Love)" | Nominated | |

== See also ==
- List of British Grammy winners and nominees
