= Man I Need =

Single by Olivia Dean

from the album The Art of Loving
- B-side: "Man I Need" (live at Brooklyn Paramount)
- Released: 15 August 2025
- Recorded: March–April 2025
- Studio: Unnamed studio (East London)
- Genre: Pop; R&B; gospel
- Length: 3:04
- Label: Capitol
- Songwriters: Olivia Dean; Tobias Jesso Jr.; Zach Nahome
- Producer: Nahome

Olivia Dean singles chronology
"Lady Lady" (2025)	"Man I Need" (2025)	"So Easy (To Fall in Love)" (2025)

Music video
- "Man I Need" on YouTube

"Man I Need" is a song by English singer-songwriter Olivia Dean, released on 15 August 2025 as the third single from her second studio album, The Art of Loving (2025). Acclaimed by music critics, who appreciated its pop, R&B and gospel influenced sound and lyrics, the song was a commercial success, becoming Dean's first top 10 on the US charts and her first number one single on the UK charts. The song was voted in at number one in Australian youth broadcaster Triple J's Hottest 100 of 2025 with millions of votes cast, and received a nomination for Song of the Year at the 2026 Brit Awards. It received three nominations at the 69th Annual Grammy Awards including Record Of The Year and Song of the year.

"Man I Need" peaked at number one in Australia, Belgium (Flanders), Canada, Iceland, Ireland, the Netherlands and New Zealand, and became her first chart entry in the United States, peaking at number two on the Billboard Hot 100, and subsequently at number two on the Billboard Global 200.

== Background and release ==
Universal Music announced the single on 15 August 2025, positioning it as the third preview from Dean's album The Art of Loving and confirming an accompanying music video. Independent music media also reported the release and its placement within the album campaign. Upon release, Dean said: "'Man I Need' is a song about knowing how you deserve to be loved and not being afraid to ask for it. It's forward, sexy, fun. It's made for dancing". A vinyl release was issued on 12 December 2025.

== Lyrics and composition ==
In interviews and label materials, Dean described "Man I Need" as a song about "knowing how you deserve to be loved and not being afraid to ask for it," adding that it was made for dancing. Critics noted that the track's assertive lyrical appeal is carried by an upbeat, dance-oriented arrangement that blends elements of pop, R&B and gospel, and compared it to works by Michael Jackson, Whitney Houston, and Luther Vandross. The song is in the key of C-sharp major and follows a 12/8 time signature with a tempo of 119 beats per minute.

== Music video ==
The music video for "Man I Need" was released alongside the single and was directed by Jake Erland. Coverage described a studio-lot setting in which set pieces rotate around Dean as different potential partners pass by, reinforcing the song's lyrical request for clarity and connection.

== Critical reception ==
Exclaim! ranked it as the 5th best song of 2025, praising its "nostalgic yet modern soul-pop sound". Helen Brown of The Independent called the song the centrepiece of the album, with a "splashy-fun keyboard riff and upward inflected chorus". NME's Hannah Mylrea described it as "a flirty, gospel-laced sugar rush that's the sonic equivalent of romantic butterflies". Writing for The Skinny, Rhea Hagiwara praised it as a "a standout within the bigger picture of the album as a vibrant, forward, danceable track with an assertive lyrical voice". Larisha Paul of Rolling Stone called it an "undeniable hit" with "impenetrable confidence". Marquis Munson of WNXP praised the song's "jazzy pop and soulful grooves paired with Dean's calm and collected vocals". The New York Times praised Dean's vocals as "full of heart, soul and elegance" and its lyrics as "something refreshing about a song that yearns so sincerely for connection".

=== End-Year Critical Accolades ===
Publication	Accolade	Rank	Ref.
Exclaim!	20 Best Songs of 2025	5	
The Guardian	The 20 best songs of 2025	13	
Los Angeles Times	The 25 best songs of 2025	10	
The New York Times	Best Songs of 2025	2	
NME	The 50 best songs of 2025	17	
NPR	The 25 Best Songs Of 2025	—N/a	
Radio 1	Biggest Songs of 2025	1	
Rolling Stone	The 100 Best Songs of 2025	15	

== Awards ==
Year	Award	Category	Result	Ref.
2026	Brit Awards	Song of the Year	Nominated	
2026	iHeartRadio Music Awards	Best Lyrics	Nominated	
2026	MOBO Awards	Song of the Year	Won	
2026	American Music Awards	Song of the Year	Nominated	
2026	American Music Awards	Best Pop Song	Nominated	
2026	MTV Video Music Awards	Song of the Year	Nominated	
2026	Soul Train Awards	R&B/Soul Song Of The Year	Pending	
2026	Nickelodeon Kids' Choice Awards	Favorite Viral Song	Won	
2026	Los 40 Music Awards	Best International Song	Nominated	

== Commercial performance ==
In the United Kingdom, the song debuted at number eight on the UK singles chart, the artist's third single to appear in the top ten after "Nice to Each Other" and "Rein Me In". In the week ending 2 October 2025, "Man I Need" reached number one on the chart; In the same week, the album from which it was taken, The Art of Loving, reached number one on the UK Albums Chart, making Dean the first British female artist to achieve it since 2021, when Adele occupied the top positions with the song "Easy on Me" and the album 30. "Man I Need" was streamed 119 million times in the UK in 2025 and was ranked the ninth most-successful song of the year by the Official Charts Company, marking the highest-ranking song on the year-end chart by a British artist. The song has been certified quintuple platinum by the British Phonographic Industry (BPI) for sales of 3,000,000 equivalent units.

In the United States, "Man I Need" became Dean's first song to debut on the Billboard Hot 100 at number 82 in September 2025. The song subsequently climbed the charts, peaking at number two, earning the singer her first top-10 song on the Hot 100. The song was certified platinum by RIAA for selling over one million copies.

In Australia, "Man I Need" became Dean's first number one song on the chart. The song spent twenty-one non-consecutive weeks at number one, becoming the second-longest number one single on the chart history, behind "Dance Monkey" by Tones and I which spent twenty-five weeks, and the longest running number one single by a solo British female artist, overtaking Sandi Thom's "I Wish I Was a Punk Rocker (With Flowers in My Hair)" (2006), which spent ten weeks. In New Zealand the song peaked at number one for a record-breaking thirty-one weeks. Dean spent twenty-two simultaneous weeks at one with the album The Art of Loving, holding the record for the most weeks at one for an album and a related single, surpassing ABBA's 50-year-old record gained by The Best of ABBA and the song "Fernando".

In France, the song peaked at number 46, becoming her first to reach the top fifty on the French Singles Chart.

== Track listing ==
Digital single

1. "Man I Need" – 3:04

7" single (0602478163456)

1. "Man I Need" – 3:04
2. "Man I Need" (live at Brooklyn Paramount)

== Charts ==
=== Weekly charts ===
Weekly chart performance for "Man I Need"
Chart (2025–2026)	Peak position
Argentina Anglo Airplay (Monitor Latino)	7
Australia (ARIA)	1
Australia Airplay (RCS)	1
Austria (Ö3 Austria Top 40)	8
Austria Airplay (IFPI)	4
Belgium (Ultratop 50 Flanders)	1
Belgium (Ultratop 50 Wallonia)	4
Bolivia Anglo Airplay (Monitor Latino)	4
Brazil Airplay (Top 100 Brasil)	55
Bulgaria Airplay (PROPHON)	7
Canada Hot 100 (Billboard)	1
Canada AC (Billboard)	2
Canada CHR/Top 40 (Billboard)	1
Canada Hot AC (Billboard)	1
Canada Modern Rock (Billboard Canada)	34
Central America Anglo Airplay (Monitor Latino)	5
Chile Anglo Airplay (Monitor Latino)	5
Colombia Anglo Airplay (Monitor Latino)	3
CIS Airplay (TopHit)	32
Costa Rica Anglo Airplay (Monitor Latino)	6
Croatia International Airplay (Top lista)	4
Czech Republic Singles Digital (ČNS IFPI)	82
Denmark (Tracklisten)	2
Denmark Airplay (Tracklisten)	1
Dominican Republic Anglo Airplay (Monitor Latino)	2
Ecuador Anglo Airplay (Monitor Latino)	8
Estonia Airplay (TopHit)	20
France (SNEP)	46
France Airplay (SNEP)	45
Germany (GfK)	7
Germany Airplay (MusicTrace)	3
Global 200 (Billboard)	2
Greece International (IFPI)	25
Guatemala Anglo Airplay (Monitor Latino)	3
Honduras Anglo Airplay (Monitor Latino)	2
Hungary (Editors' Choice Top 40)	15
Iceland (Tónlistinn)	1
Ireland (IRMA)	1
Israel (Mako Hitlist)	89
Italy (FIMI)	61
Jamaica Airplay (JAMMS)	1
Japan Hot Overseas (Billboard Japan)	5
Latin America Anglo Airplay (Monitor Latino)	5
Latvia Airplay (LaIPA)	4
Latvia Streaming (LaIPA)	17
Lithuania (AGATA)	15
Lithuania Airplay (TopHit)	6
Luxembourg (Billboard)	8
Malaysia (Billboard)	25
Malta Airplay (Radiomonitor)	1
Middle East and North Africa (IFPI)	15
Mexico Anglo Airplay (Monitor Latino)	4
Netherlands (Dutch Top 40)	1
Netherlands (Single Top 100)	1
New Zealand (Recorded Music NZ)	1
Nicaragua Anglo Airplay (Monitor Latino)	3
Nigeria (TurnTable Top 100)	54
Nigeria Airplay (TurnTable)	25
North Macedonia Airplay (Radiomonitor)	4
Norway (VG-lista)	3
Norway Airplay (IFPI)	5
Panama Anglo Airplay (Monitor Latino)	7
Panama Streaming (PRODUCE)	139
Paraguay Airplay (Monitor Latino)	13
Peru Anglo Airplay (Monitor Latino)	5
Philippines Hot 100 (Billboard Philippines)	3
Poland Airplay (OLiS)	19
Poland Streaming (OLiS)	90
Portugal (AFP)	11
Portugal Airplay (AFP)	9
Puerto Rico Anglo Airplay (Monitor Latino)	2
Russia Airplay (TopHit)	185
Serbia Airplay (Radiomonitor)	8
Singapore (RIAS)	10
Slovakia Airplay (ČNS IFPI)	7
Slovakia Singles Digital (ČNS IFPI)	36
Slovenia Airplay (Radiomonitor)	7
Spain (Promusicae)	65
Spain Airplay (Promusicae)	13
South Africa Airplay (TOSAC)	2
South Africa Streaming (TOSAC)	9
Suriname (Nationale Top 40)	5
Sweden (Sverigetopplistan)	2
Switzerland (Schweizer Hitparade)	4
Switzerland Airplay (MusicTrace)	2
United Arab Emirates (IFPI)	3
UK Singles (Official Charts)	1
Uruguay Anglo Airplay (Monitor Latino)	7
US Billboard Hot 100	2
US Adult Contemporary (Billboard)	3
US Adult Pop Airplay (Billboard)	1
US Pop Airplay (Billboard)	1
US Rhythmic Airplay (Billboard)	17
Venezuela Airplay (Record Report)	36

=== Monthly charts ===
Monthly chart performance for "Man I Need"
Chart (2025–2026)	Peak position
CIS Airplay (TopHit)	34
Estonia Airplay (TopHit)	24
Lithuania Airplay (TopHit)	7
Panama Streaming (PRODUCE)	159
Paraguay Airplay (SGP)	21

=== Year-end charts ===
Year end chart performance for "Man I Need"
Chart (2025)	Position
Australia (ARIA)	15
Austria (Ö3 Austria Top 40)	73
Belgium (Ultratop 50 Flanders)	22
Belgium (Ultratop 50 Wallonia)	147
Denmark (Tracklisten)	37
Estonia Airplay (TopHit)	106
Iceland (Tónlistinn)	78
Lithuania Airplay (TopHit)	36
Netherlands (Dutch Top 40)	12
Netherlands (Single Top 100)	24
New Zealand (Recorded Music NZ)	7
Philippines (Philippines Hot 100)	91
Sweden (Sverigetopplistan)	68
Switzerland (Schweizer Hitparade)	66
UK Singles (OCC)	9

== Certifications ==
Certifications for "Man I Need"
Region	Certification	Certified units/sales
Australia (ARIA)	9× Platinum	630,000^{‡}
Belgium (BRMA)	2× Platinum	80,000^{‡}
Brazil (Pro-Música Brasil)	Diamond	160,000^{‡}
Canada (Music Canada)	2× Platinum	160,000^{‡}
Denmark (IFPI Danmark)	2× Platinum	180,000^{‡}
France (SNEP)	Platinum	200,000^{‡}
Germany (BVMI)	Gold	300,000^{‡}
Italy (FIMI)	Gold	100,000^{‡}
New Zealand (RMNZ)	8× Platinum	240,000^{‡}
Norway (IFPI Norway)	Platinum	60,000^{‡}
Poland (ZPAV)	Gold	62,500^{‡}
Portugal (AFP)	3× Platinum	75,000^{‡}
Spain (Promusicae)	Platinum	100,000^{‡}
Switzerland (IFPI Switzerland)	Platinum	30,000^{‡}
United Kingdom (BPI)	5× Platinum	3,000,000^{‡}
United States (RIAA)	2× Platinum	2,000,000^{‡}
Streaming
Central America (CFC)	Gold	3,500,000^{†}
Greece (IFPI Greece)	Gold	1,000,000^{†}
Slovakia (ČNS IFPI)	Gold	850,000^{†}
Sweden (GLF)	2× Platinum	24,000,000^{†}
^{‡} Sales+streaming figures based on certification alone.^{†} Streaming-only figures based on certification alone.

== Release history ==
Release dates and formats for "Man I Need"
Region	Date	Format	Label(s)	Ref.
Various	15 August 2025	Digital download; streaming	Capitol	
Italy	11 September 2025	Radio airplay	EMI	
United States	16 September 2025	Contemporary hit radio	Island; Republic	
Various	12 December 2025	7" single	Capitol	
