= Kokoroko =

British musical group

- Origin: London, England
- Genres: Jazz, Afrobeat
- Years active: 2014–present
- Members: Sheila Maurice-Grey; Onome Edgeworth; Anoushka Nanguy; Ayo Salawu; Duane Atherley; Tobi Adenaike; Yohan Kebede
- Website: kokorokomusic.co.uk

Kokoroko is a British London-based septet, led by Sheila Maurice-Grey and Onome Edgeworth playing a fusion of funk and highlife.

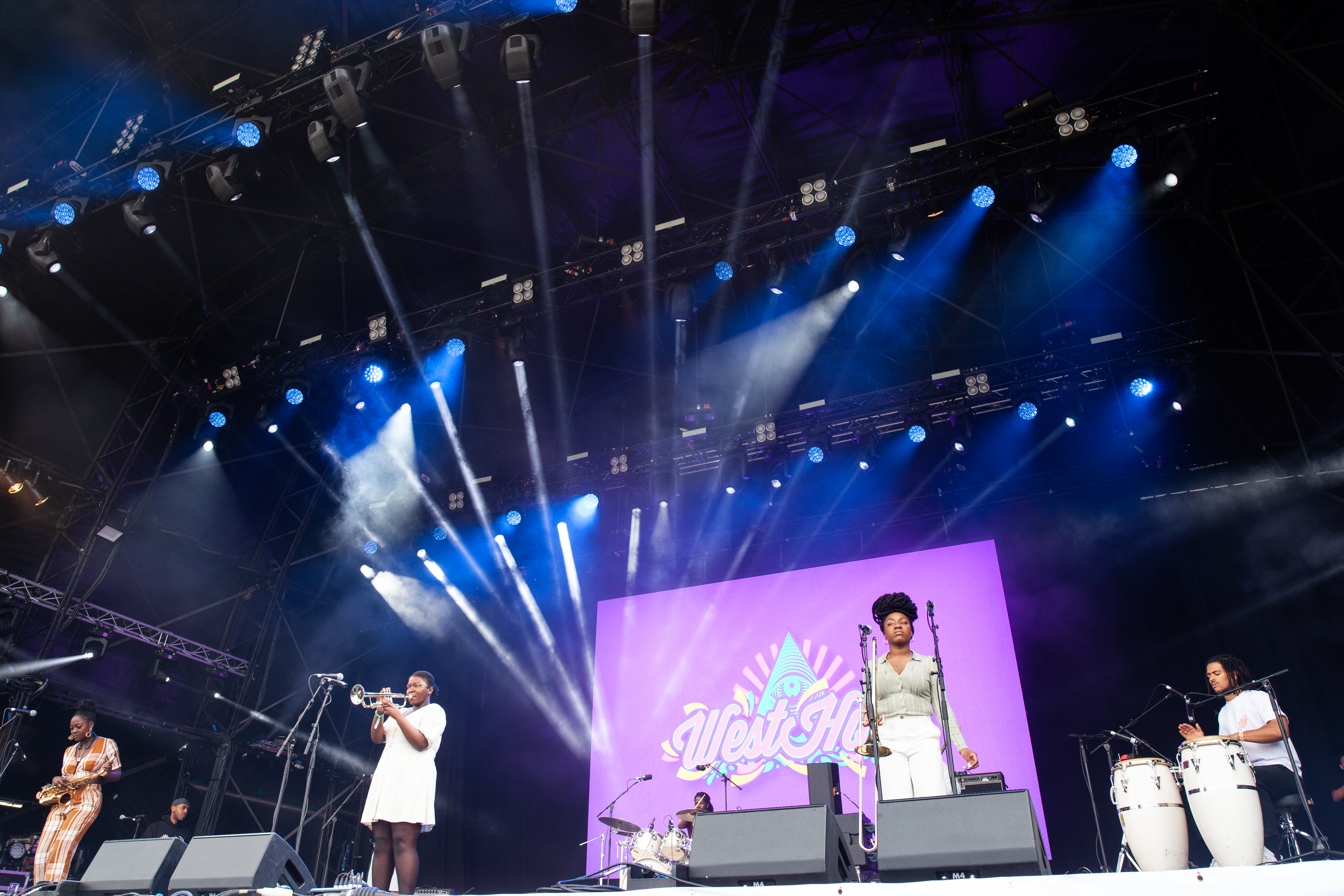
Kokoroko in 2019

In February 2019, they were named "ones to watch" by The Guardian journalist Ammar Kalia, after their track "Abusey Junction" garnered 57 million views on YouTube. "Abusey Junction" won Track of the Year at Gilles Peterson's Worldwide Awards in 2019.

In February 2020, they won Best Group at the Urban Music Awards. In September 2020, they played BBC Proms at the Royal Albert Hall. Their name is an Urhobo word meaning "be strong" or "hard to break".

They released their debut album Could We Be More in August 2022. The Guardian named it one of the top ten jazz albums of the year. Also in 2022, the band were nominated for Band of the Year at the Jazz FM Awards.

Their second album, Tuff Times Never Last was released on 11 July 2025.

== Members ==
- Sheila Maurice-Grey (trumpet / flugelhorn / vocals)
- Onome Edgeworth (congas / percussion)
- Anoushka „Noushy“ Nanguy (trombone / vocals)
- Ayo Salawu (drums / vocals)
- Duane Atherley (bass / vocals)
- Tobi Adenaike (guitar / vocals)
- Yohan Kebede (keyboards / vocals)

== Discography ==
=== Albums ===
List of albums, with selected chart positions
Title	Album details	Peak chart positions
Title	Album details	UK
Could We Be More	Released: 2022; Label: Brownswood	30
Tuff Times Never Last	Released: 11 July 2025; Label: Brownswood	

=== Extended plays ===
List of EPs, with selected chart positions
Title	EP details	Peak chart positions
Title	EP details	UK
Kokoroko	Released: 2019; Label: Brownswood	
Live At Metropolis	Released: 18 April 2026; Label: Brownswood; RSD 2026 exclusive	
