= So Easy (To Fall in Love) =

2025 single by Olivia Dean

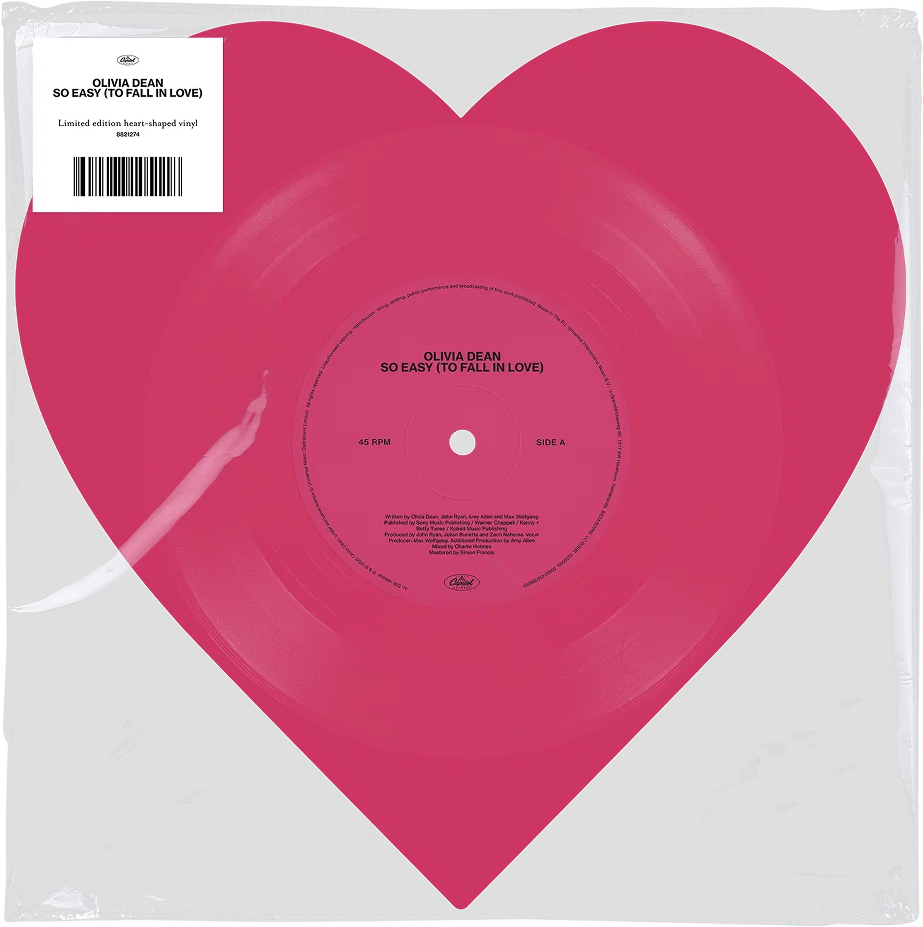
- 10" single mockup

Single by Olivia Dean

from the album The Art of Loving
- B-side: "I've Seen It"
- Released: 26 September 2025
- Genre: Jazz pop; bossa nova
- Length: 2:49
- Label: Capitol
- Songwriters: Olivia Dean; Amy Allen; John Ryan; Max Wolfgang
- Producers: Zach Nahome; John Ryan; Julian Bunetta; Amy Allen; Max Wolfgang

Olivia Dean singles chronology
"Man I Need" (2025)	"So Easy (To Fall in Love)" (2025)	"A Couple Minutes" (2026)

Music video
- "So Easy (To Fall in Love)" on YouTube

"So Easy (To Fall in Love)" is a song by English singer-songwriter Olivia Dean, released on 26 September 2025 as the fourth single from her second studio album, The Art of Loving, which was released on the same day. It was produced by Zach Nahome, John Ryan and Julian Bunetta, with Amy Allen and Max Wolfgang serving as additional and vocal producers respectively. It reached number two on the UK Singles Chart and has been certified platinum by the British Phonographic Industry. It also peaked at number five on the Billboard Hot 100, becoming her second song to peak in the top 5 in the United States.

== Background ==
In an interview with Elle, Olivia Dean said of the song:

I've had songs in the past that I've specifically written to uplift other women. Men, of course, can take what they want to take from it, music is for everybody, but I'm such a strong feminist, and I can't help but let that seep into my music. I've had friends go on first dates and be so caught up in worrying if the other person will like them and thinking about what they can be to slot into this person's life without actually stopping to think, "Hang on a minute. Maybe this date is me just checking if I like them", rather than putting all the emphasis on them liking you. I just wanted to say, "You'd be really easy to fall in love with. Anyone will be lucky to have you in their life". And it's easy to forget that sometimes. So I think this song is just a pat on the back when you're going out the door on your first date.

== Composition and lyrics ==
"So Easy (To Fall in Love)" is a bossa nova and jazz pop song, with an instrumental composed of drums, piano and trumpet. Music critics have compared the style to that of The Supremes, and "Carpenters-style MOR pop that would once have been considered entirely beyond the pale". It finds Olivia Dean in a confident mood and using flirting and persuasion to address her lover, as she expresses her excitement of entering a new relationship. She proclaims herself to be "the perfect mix of Saturday night and the rest of your life". The song is written in the key of E-flat major with a time signature of 4/4 and a tempo of 70 beats per minute.

== Music video ==
On 26 September 2025, the official music video, directed by Jake Erland, was published alongside the single on the singer's YouTube channel, on the same day as the release of the album.

== Critical reception ==
The song received universal acclaim. Thomas Smith of Billboard ranked it as the third best song from The Art of Loving and lauded Dean's performance in bossa nova, describing the song to be "perhaps the most forthright attempt at reviving Astrud Gilberto's impactful and achingly beautiful vocals alongside a lithe percussion section". Rhea Hagiwara of The Skinny described the song as a "charming number that highlights Dean's wide range of vocal inflections, whether endearing, confident or flirtatious, accompanied by a playful assortment of instrumentation and backing vocals". Helen Brown of The Independent called the song "sweet-strummed" and wrote "Backing vocals are layered like chiffon as cocktail piano notes shimmy around a Bacharach and David-indebted trumpet". Larisha Paul of Rolling Stone commented on the song, "The saccharine jazz pop standout calls to mind the glamour of Diana Ross".

== Commercial performance ==
In the United Kingdom, the song debuted at number nine on the UK singles chart, becoming Dean's fourth song to reach the top 10. The song was at its peak at number two for two consecutive weeks between 26 February 2026 and 5 March 2026, behind Dean's collaborative song with Sam Fender, "Rein Me In", which peaked at number-one the same week. The song was certified double platinum by the British Phonographic Industry (BPI).

In the United States, the song debuted at number 98 on the Billboard Hot 100, peaking at number five on the chart dated 23 May 2026. It became Dean's second top-ten song after "Man I Need", and made Dean the first British woman to place her first two top-five hits in the bracket simultaneously. The song was certified platinum by the Recording Industry Association of America (RIAA) for selling over one million copies.

== Track listing ==
10" LP
A: "So Easy (To Fall in Love)"
B: "I've Seen It"

== Charts ==
=== Weekly charts ===
Weekly chart performance
Chart (2025–2026)	Peak position
Australia (ARIA)	2
Austria (Ö3 Austria Top 40)	37
Austria Airplay (IFPI)	22
Belgium (Ultratop 50 Flanders)	1
Belgium (Ultratop 50 Wallonia)	3
Bolivia Airplay (Monitor Latino)	15
Brazil Airplay (Top 100 Brasil)	100
Canada Hot 100 (Billboard)	3
Canada AC (Billboard)	1
Canada CHR/Top 40 (Billboard)	1
Canada Hot AC (Billboard)	1
Canada Modern Rock (Billboard Canada)	38
Central America Anglo Airplay (Monitor Latino)	14
Chile Anglo Airplay (Monitor Latino)	13
Colombia Anglo Airplay (Monitor Latino)	10
CIS Airplay (TopHit)	119
Costa Rica Anglo Airplay (Monitor Latino)	6
Croatia International Airplay (Top lista)	5
Denmark (Tracklisten)	15
Dominican Republic Anglo Airplay (Monitor Latino)	3
Ecuador Anglo Airplay (Monitor Latino)	13
El Salvador Anglo Airplay (Monitor Latino)	3
Estonia Airplay (TopHit)	30
Finland Airplay (Radiosoittolista)	24
France (SNEP)	104
Germany (GfK)	42
Germany Airplay (MusicTrace)	26
Global 200 (Billboard)	7
Greece International (IFPI)	11
Guatemala Anglo Airplay (Monitor Latino)	6
Honduras Airplay (Monitor Latino)	11
Hong Kong (Billboard)	25
Hungary (Editors' Choice Top 40)	33
Iceland (Tónlistinn)	11
Indonesia (Billboard)	20
Ireland (IRMA)	3
Israel (Mako Hitlist)	45
Italy Airplay (EarOne)	11
Jamaica Airplay (JAMMS)	4
Japan Hot Overseas (Billboard Japan)	9
Latin America Anglo Airplay (Monitor Latino)	7
Latvia Airplay (LaIPA)	9
Lebanon (Lebanese Top 20)	2
Lithuania (AGATA)	31
Lithuania Airplay (TopHit)	26
Luxembourg (Billboard)	20
Malaysia (IFPI)	14
Malaysia International (RIM)	7
Malta Airplay (Radiomonitor)	17
Mexico Anglo Airplay (Monitor Latino)	2
Middle East and North Africa (IFPI)	9
Netherlands (Dutch Top 40)	4
Netherlands (Single Top 100)	7
Netherlands Airplay (Radiomonitor)	6
New Zealand (Recorded Music NZ)	2
Nigeria (TurnTable Top 100)	55
Norway (VG-lista)	13
Norway Airplay (IFPI)	15
Panama Streaming (PRODUCE)	134
Peru Anglo Airplay (Monitor Latino)	10
Philippines (IFPI)	3
Philippines Hot 100 (Billboard Philippines)	3
Poland Airplay (OLiS)	7
Portugal (AFP)	16
Puerto Rico Anglo Airplay (Monitor Latino)	3
Romania Airplay (TopHit)	67
San Marino Airplay (SMRTV Top 50)	17
Serbia Airplay (Radiomonitor)	18
Singapore (RIAS)	5
Slovakia Singles Digital (ČNS IFPI)	75
South Africa Airplay (TOSAC)	4
Spain (Promusicae)	91
Spain Airplay (Promusicae)	2
Suriname (Nationale Top 40)	1
Sweden (Sverigetopplistan)	18
Switzerland (Schweizer Hitparade)	19
Switzerland Airplay (MusicTrace)	2
Turkey International Airplay (Radiomonitor Türkiye)	2
United Arab Emirates (IFPI)	5
UK Singles (Official Charts)	2
US Billboard Hot 100	5
US Adult Contemporary (Billboard)	3
US Adult Pop Airplay (Billboard)	1
US Pop Airplay (Billboard)	1
US Rhythmic Airplay (Billboard)	39
Venezuela Anglo Airplay (Monitor Latino)	4

=== Monthly charts ===
Monthly chart performance
Chart (2025–2026)	Peak position
Estonia Airplay (TopHit)	31
Lithuania Airplay (TopHit)	41
Panama Streaming (PRODUCE)	135
Romania Airplay (TopHit)	90

=== Year-end charts ===
Year-end chart performance
Chart (2025)	Position
Netherlands (Dutch Top 40)	72

== Certifications ==
Certifications for "So Easy (To Fall in Love)"
Region	Certification	Certified units/sales
Australia (ARIA)	5× Platinum	350,000^{‡}
Belgium (BRMA)	Platinum	40,000^{‡}
Brazil (Pro-Música Brasil)	Diamond	160,000^{‡}
Denmark (IFPI Danmark)	Platinum	90,000^{‡}
France (SNEP)	Platinum	200,000^{‡}
Italy (FIMI)	Gold	100,000^{‡}
New Zealand (RMNZ)	4× Platinum	120,000^{‡}
Norway (IFPI Norway)	Platinum	60,000^{‡}
Poland (ZPAV)	Gold	62,500^{‡}
Portugal (AFP)	2× Platinum	50,000^{‡}
Spain (Promusicae)	Gold	50,000^{‡}
Switzerland (IFPI Switzerland)	Gold	15,000^{‡}
United Kingdom (BPI)	2× Platinum	1,200,000^{‡}
United States (RIAA)	Platinum	1,000,000^{‡}
Streaming
Central America (CFC)	Gold	3,500,000^{†}
Greece (IFPI Greece)	Platinum	2,000,000^{†}
Sweden (GLF)	Platinum	12,000,000^{†}
^{‡} Sales+streaming figures based on certification alone.^{†} Streaming-only figures based on certification alone.

== Release history ==
Release dates and formats for "So Easy (To Fall in Love)"
Region	Date	Format	Label(s)	Ref.
Various	26 September 2025	Digital download; streaming	Capitol	
United States	2 December 2025	Contemporary hit radio	Island; Republic	
Italy	13 February 2026	Radio airplay	EMI	
Various	13 February 2026	10" single	Capitol	
