= Co-op Live =

Indoor arena in Manchester, England

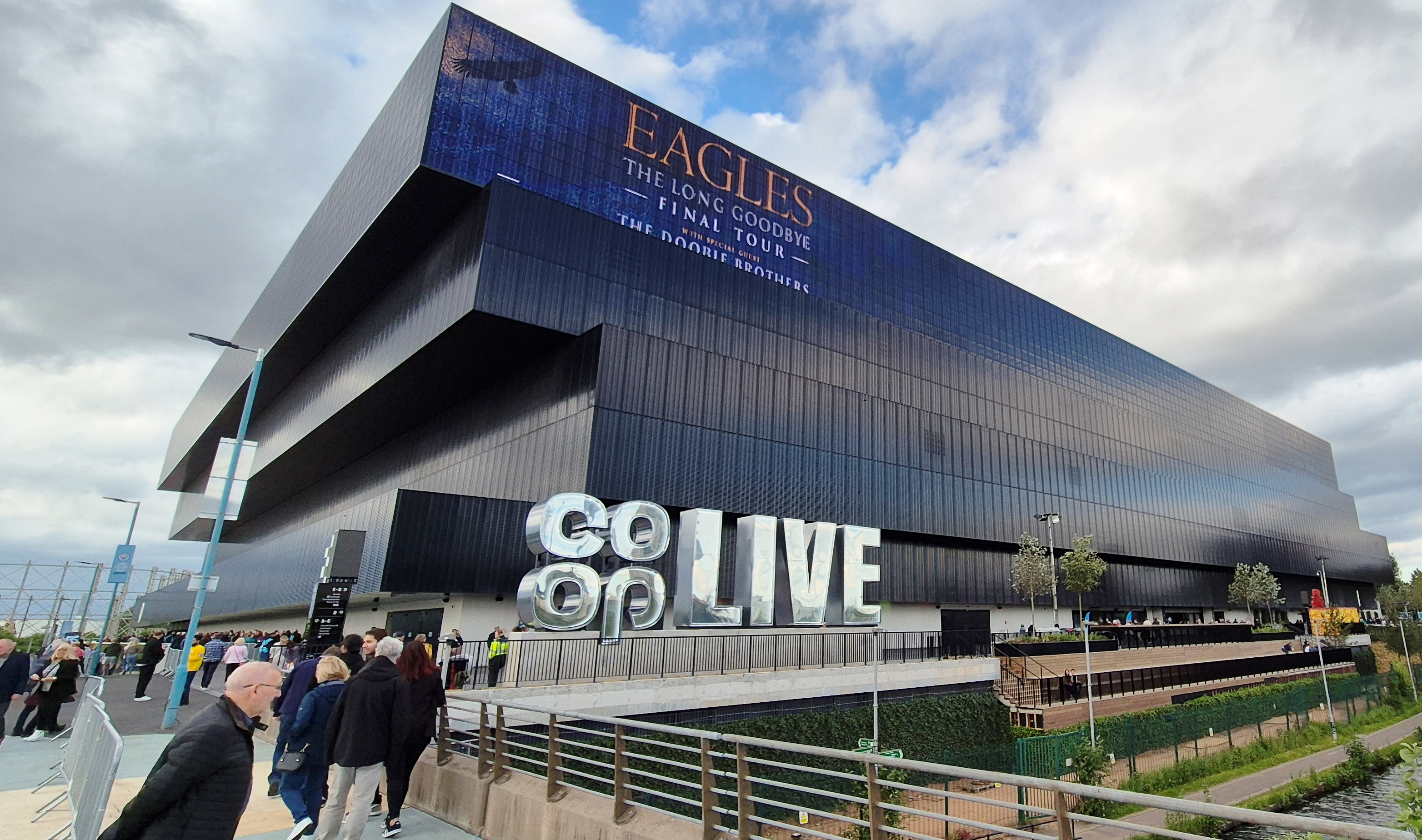
- Interactive map of Co-op Live
- Address: 1 Sportcity Way
- Location: Manchester, England; M11 3DL
- Coordinates: 53°29′11″N 2°11′59″W
- Owner: City Football Group; Oak View Group; Harry Styles
- Operator: Oak View Group
- Capacity: 20,500 (all-seated); 23,500 (with standing)
- Public transit: Etihad Campus

Construction
- Groundbreaking: May 2021
- Opened: 14 May 2024
- Cost: £365–450 million
- Architect: Populous
- Main contractor: BAM Construct UK

Website
- cooplive.com

Co-op Live is an indoor arena in Manchester, England, sited in the Etihad Campus next to the City of Manchester Stadium. It opened on 14 May 2024 and is the largest indoor arena in the United Kingdom by capacity. It can accommodate 23,500 attendees.

The venue has 32 bars, restaurants and lounges and has the largest floor space of any indoor venue in the city. Oak View Group is developing the scheme in partnership with City Football Group.

== History ==
Co-op Live was first approved in September 2020, announcing BAM Construct UK as the primary contractor. At the time, Tim Leiweke, co-founder of Oak View Group, said: "We're delighted that Manchester City Council has given our proposals the go-ahead, and we can't wait to get started, bringing £350m of private investment, creating thousands of jobs, and delivering one of the world's best arenas to this amazing city."

In 2020, the Co-operative Group announced it would be a significant investor in the arena, which would be named after it, and that Co-operative members will receive exclusive benefits regarding use of the arena.

Construction, undertaken by BAM Construct UK, started in 2021. As of 2022, the estimated cost of the scheme was £365 million. In July 2024, Royal BAM reported its UK construction business had suffered a £19.5m loss due to problems at the arena, and would be cutting jobs.

=== Opening events ===
Bury rock band Elbow officially opened the venue on 14 May 2024. The opening period also included notable performances by the likes of comedian Peter Kay, Liam Gallagher, The Killers, Take That and Nicki Minaj.

The Eagles also performed a five night residency at the venue as part of their farewell "Long Goodbye" tour, taking place in May and June 2024.

On 25 May a performance by Nicki Minaj was cancelled, after most attendees had been admitted into the venue, after the singer's arrest for drug possession at Amsterdam Airport Schiphol. The concert, which was part of the Pink Friday 2 World Tour, was rescheduled to 3 June.

=== Notable events ===
The first 12 months of Co-op Live saw over 100 shows take place, including performances by Liam Gallagher, Diljit Dosanjh, Janet Jackson and Pearl Jam. In February 2024, it was announced that the arena would host the MTV Europe Music Awards in November, which took place on 10 November 2024. On 24 April 2024, the UFC announced it would hold UFC 304: Edwards vs. Muhammad 2 at the venue on 27 July.

On 21 September 2024, Melanie Martinez made her debut at the arena as part of the European leg of her The Trilogy Tour.

In July 2024, Sabrina Carpenter announced she would play two gigs at the Co-op Live Arena as part of the European leg of her Short n' Sweet Tour.

Charli XCX opened her Brat Tour from the Manchester venue in November 2024.

Paul McCartney played the arena on 14–15 December as part of his Got Back tour.

Billie Eilish played the arena 4 consecutive nights on 19, 20, 22 and 23 July as part of her Hit Me Hard And Soft: The Tour in 2025. 28 November 2025 Bad Omens performed at Coop live. Ed Sheeran played at the arena on 7 December 2025 as part of a European Arena Tour.

The venue hosted the 2026 Brit Awards on 28 February.

=== Other events ===
Bruce Springsteen & The E Street Band performed across three nights, with the first on 14 May 2025. Olivia Rodrigo confirmed her rescheduled shows for late June and early July 2025, which were her only UK indoor shows announced for 2025. The venue also announced a UK arena exclusive run by stateside R&B artist, Chris Brown. Upon announcing Chris Brown, the venue revealed their highest ticket sales to date, and the most across Europe during that single week.

Additionally, American rapper Tyler, the Creator performed two nights at the arena on 27 and 28 May 2025 on his tour Chromakopia: The World Tour. Robbie Williams performed on 10 and 11 June 2025 as part of his Britpop Tour. Iron Maiden rocked the roof off with a headline performance at the arena on 22 June 2025 as part of their Run for Your Lives World Tour. Additionally, Lady Gaga, with her Mayhem Ball, performed two nights at Co-op Live on 7 and 8 October 2025.

Billie Eilish confirmed the venue would host four nights of her Hit Me Hard and Soft: The Tour in July 2025.

At the 2025 Forbidden Door, All Elite Wrestling announced the venue would host AEW Dynamite on 17 December 2025.

The Grand Final of the Netball Super League 2026 will be held at the arena on 20 June.

American Hip-Hop artist J. Cole will perform at the venue on 28 October 2026 as part of The Fall-Off Tour.

The National Basketball Association (NBA) announced that the first regular season game in Manchester will be played at the arena on 17 January 2027 between the San Antonio Spurs and New Orleans Pelicans.

=== Delayed opening ===
The arena was officially due to open on 23 April with a headline act by comedian Peter Kay; however, due to power supply issues at a test event featuring Rick Astley on 20 April, which resulted in 4,000 tickets being cancelled, the venue announced that Kay's performance was to be postponed until 29 and 30 April. The Black Keys were scheduled to perform on 27 April, but this was later rescheduled to 15 May. On-going technical issues saw Kay's performances rescheduled for a second time to 23 and 24 May. The venue was due to be opened on 1 May with A Boogie wit da Hoodie, but this was also postponed, as well as Olivia Rodrigo and Keane who were scheduled for the following weekend. In the wake of the delayed opening and cancellations, Take That opted to move their five concert dates from Co-op Live to rival venue the AO Arena. Co-op Live officially opened on 14 May 2024, with the band Elbow being the opening act.

== Arena design ==
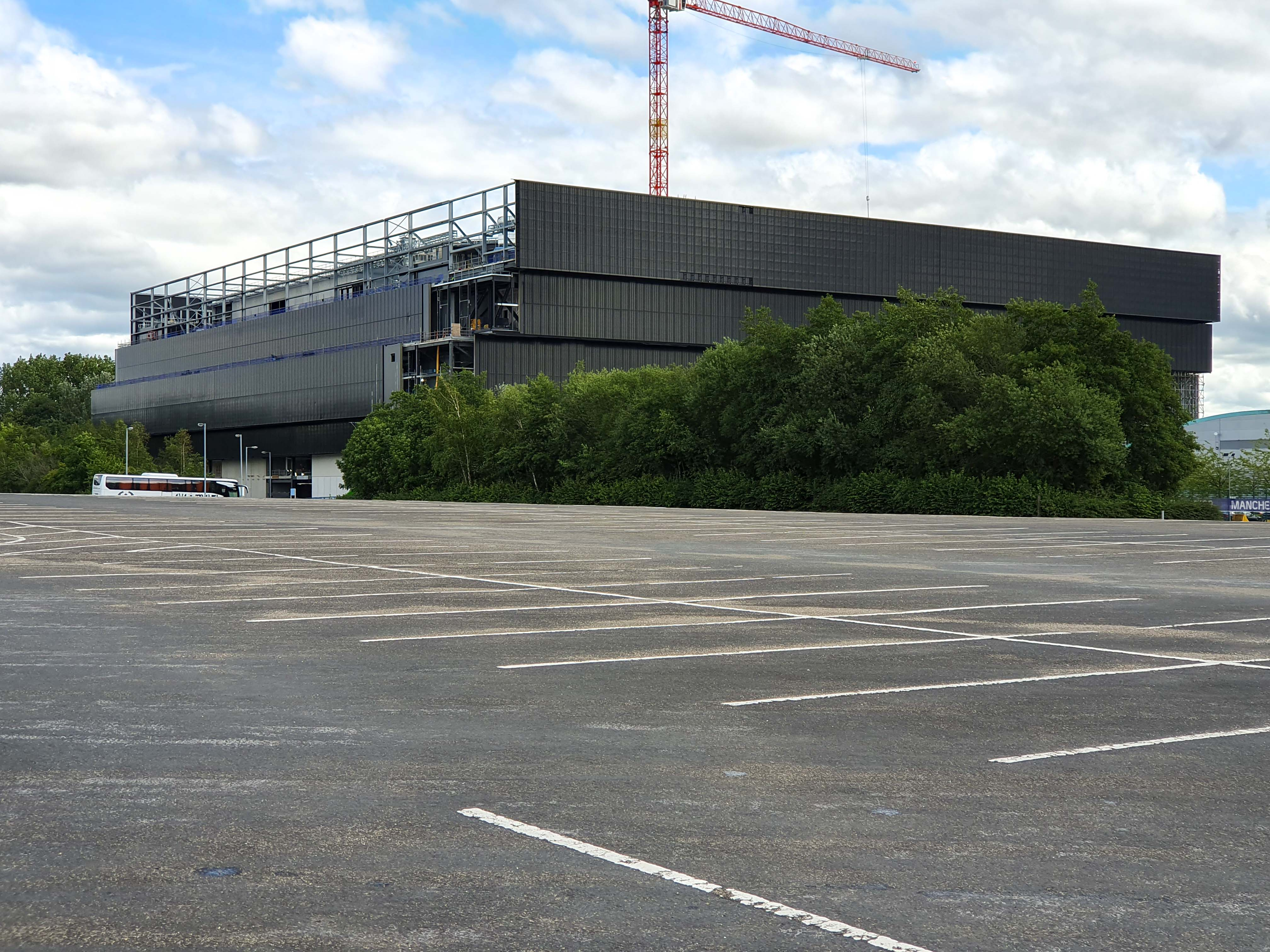
Another perspective on the construction site (August 2023)

The arena is planning to host live music, sports, comedy acts, and family entertainment events. It will have an all-seated maximum capacity of 20,500 (for a centre-stage concert, extending the retractable seating in the lower tier); but with an enhanced maximum capacity of 23,500, of whom 7,500 would be standing, when lower tier seating is retracted.

The audience bowl will be approximately square with retractable seating on level 0 and level 1, premium seating on level 2, upper tier seating on level 3, and hospitality lounges overlooking the stage at level 4 from the North and South sides; while the configuration of the auditorium is intended to be optimised for larger-scale touring music performances with a relatively low ceiling (to enhance the acoustic experience), an extensive potential flat floor area at Level 0 for standing, and minimised distances from the upper tiers to the stage. Compared to a more conventional arena bowl of equivalent size, the tiered seats on the Western side of the Co-op Arena are claimed to be around 20 metres (70 ft) closer to the performance stage. The promoters state that the interior of the bowl "has been designed to feel like the UK's largest nightclub".

The arena is planned to host around 120 events per year, 100 of which are planned music events. The design of the arena is primarily focused on hosting live music with Tim Leiweke, the CEO of the Oak View Group, stating that the design "made it about music and started there" as other arena projects had been "compromised by trying to please everyone".

In addition to live music and entertainment, the developers propose basketball, netball, tennis, esports and gymnastics as sports that could be hosted within the dimensions of the arena floor, and for which there was not, at the time, an appropriate larger venue in Manchester capable of hosting championship events. With lower-tier seating retracted, the floor would accommodate a standard ice hockey rink. For events configured with a centre stage or using the arena floor, there will be additional upper-tier seating on the East side; above and behind the normal end-stage position.

Outside the main bowl, a founding partnership with automotive retailer Vertu led to the creation of 'Vertu Place', which houses a 22 metre long bar and various food outlets.

== Entertainment events ==
Entertainment events at the Co-op Live
| Date | Artist / Event | Supporting act(s) | Tour / Event | Type | Notes |
2024
| 14 May | Elbow | -- | Audio Vertigo Tour | Concert | Inaugural show of Co-op Live |
| 15 May | The Black Keys | Circa Waves | International Players Tour | Concert | Rescheduled from April |
| 18 May | Eric Clapton | Andy Fairweather Low | Eric Clapton UK Tour | Concert | First Manchester gig in 10 years. |
| 19 May | Barry Manilow | Jimmy Tarbuck | The Last, Last UK Tour | Concert | Marked as his final UK tour date. |
| 23 May | Peter Kay | -- | Better Late Than Never Tour | Comedy | Postponed from April |
| 24 May | Peter Kay | -- | Better Late Than Never Tour | Comedy | Postponed from April |
| 30 May | Nicki Minaj | -- | Pink Friday 2 World Tour | Concert | Brought out Central Cee to perform "BAND4BAND" |
| 31 May | Eagles | Steely Dan | The Long Goodbye Tour | Concert | Nights 1-2 of the residency |
| 1 June | Eagles | Steely Dan | The Long Goodbye Tour | Concert | Nights 1-2 of the residency |
| 3 June | Nicki Minaj | | Pink Friday 2 World Tour | Concert | Brought out Aitch |
| 4 June | Eagles | Steely Dan | The Long Goodbye Tour | Concert | Nights 3-4-5 of the residency |
| 7 June | Eagles | Steely Dan | The Long Goodbye Tour | Concert | Nights 3-4-5 of the residency |
| 8 June | Eagles | Steely Dan | The Long Goodbye Tour | Concert | Nights 3-4-5 of the residency |
| 9 June | Pet Shop Boys | -- | Dreamworld: Greatest Hits Live | Concert | |
| 11 June | Take That | Olly Murs | This Life On Tour | Concert | |
| 12 June | Take That | Olly Murs | This Life On Tour | Concert | |
| 13 June | Smashing Pumpkins | Weezer, Teen Mortgage | The World Is a Vampire Tour | Concert | |
| 14 June | James | Razorlight | Live in 2024 (40th Anniversary) | Concert | One-off anniversary concert |
| 15 June | Liam Gallagher | Cast, Villanelle | Definitely Maybe - 30 Years | Concert | First of two Manchester shows |
| 16 June | Liam Gallagher | Cast, Villanelle | Definitely Maybe - 30 Years | Concert | First of two Manchester shows |
| 25 June | Pearl Jam | The Murder Capital | Dark Matter World Tour | Concert | Return to Manchester after 12 years |
| 27 June | Liam Gallagher | Cast, Villanelle | Definitely Maybe - 30 Years | Concert | Later leg, repeated after tickets were confirmed |
| 28 June | Liam Gallagher | Cast, Villanelle | Definitely Maybe - 30 Years | Concert | Later leg, repeated after tickets were confirmed |
| 9 July | Stevie Nicks | Nisa Nesbitt | Music... Live! | Concert | First UK date of tour |
| 10 July | Kings of Leon | The Vaccines | Can We Please Have Fun Tour | Concert | |
| 13 July | Travis Scott | Yung Lean | Circus Maximus Tour | Concert | First Manchester date |
| 14 July | Megan thee Stallion | Ms Banks | Hot Girl Summer Tour | Concert | |
| 16 July | Stevie Nicks | Nisa Nesbitt | Music... Live! | Concert | |
| 27 July | UFC 304 | -- | -- | Sport | First UFC event in Manchester |
| 27 August | Niall Horan | Del Water Gap | The Show: Live on Tour | Concert | Return to UK with new album tour |
| 12 September | Jonas Brothers | Mimi Webb, Deleasa | Five Albums. One Night. Tour | Concert | One-night UK show (North of England) |
| 21 September | Melanie Martinez | Sofia Isella, Elita | Trilogy Tour | Concert | |
| 22 September | Arijit Singh | -- | -- | Concert | |
| 28 September | Diljit Dosanjh | -- | Dil-Luminati Tour | Concert | |
| 1 October | Janet Jackson | Wyclef Jean | Together Again Tour | Concert | |
| 8 October | Crowded House | Liam Finn | Gravity Stairs Tour | Concert | |
| 12 October | Ms. Lauryn Hill | The Fugees, YG Marley | Miseducation/Score Reunion | Concert | Special UK reunion performance |
| 16 October | WWE Live | -- | -- | Sport | Monday Night Raw Episode |
| 28 October | Sum 41 | The Bronx | Tour of the Setting Sun | Concert | |
| 2 November | Glass Animals | The Big Moon | Dreamland Tour | Concert | |
| 10 November | MTV Europe Music Awards 2024 | Various acts | MTV EMA's | Award Show | Billed as MTV’s main event of the year. |
| 15 November | Courteeners | DMA's, Mystery Jets | Pink Cactus Café Tour | Concert | Charity album tour |
| 16 November | Kasabian | The Streets | Happenings Tour | Concert | |
| 23 November | Hits Radio Live 2024 | Rita Ora, KSI, Jax Jones, Perrie, Cian Ducrot, Teddy Swims, Clean Bandit, Tom Grennan | Hits Radio Live | Concert (festival) | Annual pop festival (sold out) |
| 24 November | Greatest Hits Radio Live 2024 | Bananarama, Kim Wilde, Soul II, Martin Fry, Martin Kemp | Greatest Hits Radio Live | Concert (festival) | Classicl pop lineup |
| 26 November | Sleep Token | Bilmuri | Chirurgie UK Tour | Concert | First UK arena headline |
| 27 November | Charlie XCX | Shygirl | BRAT Tour | Concert | |
| 28 November | Micky Flanagan | -- | If Ever We Needed It Tour | Comedy | |
| 29 November | Micky Flanagan | -- | If Ever We Needed It Tour | Comedy | |
| 30 November | The Script | Tom Walker | Satellites World Tour | Concert | Charity gig for Leukaemia |
| 6 December | Sam Fender | Wunderhouse | People Watching Tour | Concert | |
| 7 December | Sam Fender | Wunderhouse | People Watching Tour | Concert | |
| 14 December | Paul McCartney | -- | Got Back | Concert | |
| 15 December | Paul McCartney | -- | Got Back | Concert | |
2025
| 30 January | Trivium & Bullet for My Valentine | Orbit Culture | The Poisoned Ascendancy Tour | Concert | First show of 2025 in Co-op Live |
| 6 February | Young Voices | 8,000-child mass choir; special guests included MC Grammar, Tommy Blaize, Souparnika Nair, Urban Strides | Young Voices 2025 / Bob Marley 80th Birthday Worldwide Singalong | Concert | |
| 7 February | Young Voices | 8,000-child mass choir; special guests included MC Grammar, Tommy Blaize, Souparnika Nair, Urban Strides | Young Voices 2025 | Concert | |
| 9 February | Cyndi Lauper | -- | Girls Just Wanna Have Fun Farewell Tour | Concert | |
| 14 February | Craig David | Lemar, DJ Patrick Nazemi | Commitment Tour | Concert | |
| 22 February | Snow Patrol | Nina Nesbitt | The Forest Is the Path Tour | Concert | |
| 24 February | Young Voices | MC Grammar, Tommy Blaize, Souparnika Nair, Urban Strides | Young Voices 2025 | Concert | |
| 25 February | Young Voices | MC Grammar, Tommy Blaize, Souparnika Nair, Urban Strides | Young Voices 2025 | Concert | |
| 7 March | Gracie Abrams | Dora Jar | The Secret of Us Tour | Concert | |
| 10 March | Teddy Swims | Cian Ducrot | I've Tried Everything But Therapy Tour | Concert | |
| 13 March | Sabrina Carpenter | Rachel Chinouriri | Short n' Sweet Tour | Concert | |
| 14 March | Sabrina Carpenter | Rachel Chinouriri | Short n' Sweet Tour | Concert | |
| 20 March | Shane Gillis | -- | Shane Gillis Live | Comedy | |
| 29 March | John Cooper Clarke | Linto Kwesi Johnson, Jan Brierton, Freya Beer, Mike Garry | In Celebration of World Poetry Day | Poetry | First poet to headline an arena in the UK |
| 3 April | André Rieu | Johann Strauss Orchestra, choir and soloists | -- | Concert | |
| 6 April | Jeff Wayne's Music Version of The War of the Worlds | Charlie Simpson, Rou Reynolds, Max George, Maisie Smith, Anna-Marie Wayne, Nathan James | The Spirit of Man Tour | Concert | |
| 11 April | Sugababes | Rose Gray, Luna | Sugababes '25 Tour | Concert | |
| 19 April | Central Cee | Nemzzz, A2Anti, Mazza L20 | Can't Rush Greatness World Tour | Concert | |
| 21 April | Burna Boy | DJ Lambo, Spaceship Billy, Shallipopi | -- | Concert | |
| 22 April | PlayStation: The Concert | Ensemble / orchestral performers | PlayStation: The Concert | Concert | Music from God of War, The Last of Us, Ghost of Tsushima and Horizon |
| 23 April | Kaytranada | Sango, Lou Phelps, Pomo | Timeless Tour 2025 | Concert | |
| 25 April | Andrea Bocelli | -- | -- | Concert | |
| 1 May | Chase & Status | 4am Kru, Oppidan, ArrDee, IRAH, Clementine Douglas, Liam Bailey, Ethan Holt | UK Arena Tour | Concert | Large multi-act gig |
| 2 May | Chase Atlantic | Xavier Mayne | Lost in Europe & UK Tour | Concert | |
| 8 May | Olly Murs | Blue | 15 Years of Hits - Live 2025 | Concert | |
| 10 May | Gregory Porter | -- | -- | Concert | |
| 14 May | Bruce Springsteen & the E Street Band | -- | Land of Hope and Dreams Tour | Concert | European tour opening show |
| 17 May | Bruce Springsteen & the E Street Band | -- | Land of Hope and Dreams Tour | Concert | |
| 20 May | Bruce Springsteen & the E Street Band | -- | Land of Hope and Dreams Tour | Concert | |
| 21 May | Scissor Sisters | Alison Goldfrapp, Nicola Roberts | 20th Anniversary Tour | Concert | |
| 24 May | Tate Mcrae | Benee | Miss Possessive Tour | Concert | |
| 27 May | Tyler, the Creator | Lil Yachty, Paris Texas | Chromakopia: The World Tour | Concert | |
| 28 May | Tyler, the Creator | Lil Yachty, Paris Texas | Chromakopia: The World Tour | Concert | |
| 29 May | John Legend | -- | Get Lifted 20th Anniversary Tour | Concert | |
| 1 June | Don Toliver | -- | Psycho Tour: Europe | Concert | |
| 5 June | Massive Attack | 47soul | -- | Concert | Billed as a UK arena exclusive |
| 7 June | Morrissey | Brigitte Calls Me Baby | -- | Concert | |
| 8 June | Pitbull | Shaggy | Party After Dark Tour | Concert | |
| 10 June | Robbie Williams | The Lottery Winners, Lucy Spraggan | Britpop Tour | Concert | |
| 11 June | Robbie Williams | The Lottery Winners | Britpop Tour | Concert | |
| 12 June | Lionel Richie | Brooke Combe | Say Hello to the Hits Tour | Concert | |
| 13 June | Lionel Richie | Brooke Combe | Say Hello to the Hits Tour | Concert | |
| 14 June | Jeff Dunham | -- | Artificial Intelligence | Comedy | |
| 15 June | Chris Brown | Bryson Tiller | Breezy Bowl XX | Concert | |
| 16 June | Chris Brown | Bryson Tiller | Breezy Bowl XX | Concert | |
| 17 June | Nine Inch Nails | Boys Noize | Peel it Back Tour | Concert | |
| 19 June | Santana | -- | Oneness Tour 2025 | Concert | |
| 21 June | Pulp | -- | Here Comes More Tour | Concert | Final date of Pulp's UK/Ireland arena tour |
| 22 June | Iron Maiden | The Raven Age | Run for Your Lives World Tour | Concert | 50th Anniversary Tour |
| 24 June | Chris Brown | Bryson Tiller | Breezy Bowl XX | Concert | |
| 25 June | Tate Mcrae | Benee | Miss Possessive Tour | Concert | |
| 26 June | Diana Ross | Hallé Orchestra | Live 2025 UK & EU Tour | Concert | Hallé Orchestra accompanied Ross |
| 30 June | Olivia Rodrigo | -- | GUTS World Tour: Spilled | Concert | |
| 1 Jul | Olivia Rodrigo | -- | GUTS World Tour: Spilled | Concert | |
| 3 July | Chris Brown | Bryson Tiller | Breezy Bowl XX | Concert | |
| 4 July | Mary J. Blige | Soul II Soul | For My Fans Tour | Concert | |
| 5 July | Stevie Wonder | -- | Love, Light & Song | Concert | |
| 6 July | Ludovico Einaudi | Sam Lee | The Summer Portraits Tour | Concert | |
| 9 July | Jeff Lynne's ELO | Dhani Harrison | Over and Out Tour | Concert | |
| 15 July | The Doobie Brothers | -- | -- | Concert | |
| 19 July | Billie Eilish | Syd | Hit Me Hard and Soft: The Tour | Concert | Recorded the concert film Hit Me Hard and Soft: The Tour (Live in 3D) by Billie Eilish and James Cameron |
| 20 July | Billie Eilish | Syd | Hit Me Hard and Soft: The Tour | Concert | Recorded the concert film Hit Me Hard and Soft: The Tour (Live in 3D) by Billie Eilish and James Cameron |
| 22 July | Billie Eilish | Syd, Finneas | Hit Me Hard and Soft: The Tour | Concert | Recorded the concert film Hit Me Hard and Soft: The Tour (Live in 3D) by Billie Eilish and James Cameron |
| 23 July | Billie Eilish | Syd, Finneas | Hit Me Hard and Soft: The Tour | Concert | Recorded the concert film Hit Me Hard and Soft: The Tour (Live in 3D) by Billie Eilish and James Cameron |
| 25 July | Drake | PARTYNEXTDOOR, Central Cee | Some Special Shows 4 U | Concert | |
| 26 July | Drake | PARTYNEXTDOOR | Some Special Shows 4 U | Concert | |
| 4 August | Drake | PARTYNEXTDOOR | Some Special Shows 4 U | Concert | |
| 5 August | Drake | PARTYNEXTDOOR | Some Special Shows 4 U | Concert | |
| 8 August | Drake | PARTYNEXTDOOR | Some Special Shows 4 U | Concert | |
| 10 September | Vybz Kartel | -- | The Worl' Boss Tour 2025 | Concert | |
| 19 September | Tom Grennan | Tom Walker, Rianne Downey | Tom Grennan '25 | Concert | |
| 20 September | Lewis Capaldi | Skye Newman, Aaron Rowe | 2025 UK/EU Tour | Concert | |
| 21 September | Lewis Capaldi | Skye Newman, Aaron Rowe | 2025 UK/EU Tour | Concert | |
| 24 September | OneRepublic | Ella Henderson | Escape to Europe 2025 Tour | Concert | |
| 25 September | Pierce the Veil | Cavetown, Hot mulligan, Crawlers | I Can't Hear You World Tour | Concert | |
| 27 September | Simply Red | Rumer | 40th Anniversary Tour | Concert | |
| 3 October | The Kooks | The K's | Never/Know Tour | Concert | |
| 4 October | John Bishop | -- | 25 Years of Stand Up | Comedy | |
| 5 October | John Bishop | -- | 25 Years of Stand Up | Comedy | |
| 7 October | Lady Gaga | -- | The Mayhem Ball | Concert | |
| 8 October | Lady Gaga | -- | The Mayhem Ball | Concert | |
| 10 October | Architects | Wage War, House of Protection | European Tour 2025 | Concert | |
| 16 October | Little Simz | Greentea Peng | Lotus Tour | Concert | |
| 17 October | A. R. Rahman | -- | The Wonderment Tour | Concert | |
| 19 October | Warehouse Worship | -- | -- | Christian Worship Event | Non-concert religious event |
| 24 October | Jason Manford | -- | A Manford All Seasons | Comedy | |
| 26 October | Benson Boone | Elliot James Reay | American Heart World Tour | Concert | |
| 27 October | Benson Boone | Elliot James Reay | American Heart World Tour | Concert | |
| 28 October | Tom Odell | Chance Peña, Matilda Mann | Wonderful Life Tour | Concert | |
| 30 October | HAIM | Nell Mescal | I Quit Tour | Concert | |
| 31 October | Duran Duran | -- | Danse Macabre | Concert | Halloween Themed Show |
| 1 November | Joshua Buatsi vs Zach Parker | Full boxing undercard | Lights Out | Boxing | |
| 5 November | Busted vs McFly | Busted / McFly | Busted vs McFly Tour | Concert | |
| 8 November | Richard Ashcroft | The Lathums | -- | Concert | |
| 15 November | JLS | Example | The Club Is Alive: 2025 Hits Tour | Concert | |
| 18 November | Five | MistaJam, Naughty Boy | Keep On Movin' Tour | Concert | |
| 22 November | Hits Radio Live | Jax Jones, Sugababes, Tinie Tempah, Ella Henderson, Craig David, Olly Murs, Myles Smith | Hits Radio Live 2025 | Concert (festival) | |
| 28 November | Bad Omens | Bilmuri, The Ghost Inside | Do You Feel Love? Europe 2025 | Concert | |
| 29 November | Sonny Fodera | Jazzy, Saffron Stone | -- | Concert | |
| 2 December | Hans Zimmer | -- | Hans Zimmer Live - The Next Level | Concert | |
| 3 December | Mumford & Sons | Sierra Ferrell | Rushmere Tour | Concert | |
| 5 December | Sabaton | The Legendary Orchestra | The Legendary Tour | Concert | |
| 6 December | Jamiroquai | Erick the Architect | The Heels of Steel Tour | Concert | |
| 7 December | Ed Sheeran | Nizlopi, BIIRD | Arena Tour 2025 | Concert | |
| 8 December | Ice Nine Kills | Creeper, The Devil Wears Prada, TX2 | A Work of Art Tour | Concert | |
| 9 December | D-Block Europe | Mazza L20 | PTSD2 Tour | Concert | |
| 10 December | D-Block Europe | Mazza L20 | PTSD2 Tour | Concert | |
| 12 December | Stereophonics | Finn Forster | Winter Arena Tour 2025 | Concert | |
| 14 December | R&B Xmas Ball | Boyz II Men, Toni Braxton, Joe, Dru Hill | RNB Xmas Ball | Concert (festival) | Christmas Themed Concert (festival) |
| 17 December | AEW, Ring of Honor | Multiple wrestlers | Holiday Bash 2025 / Dynamite / Collision / Global Wars UK | Sport | |
2026
| 17 January | Biffy Clyro | SOFT PLAY | Futique Tour | Concert | |
| 5 February | Young Voices 2026 | Alex Spencer, Ruti, YolanDa Brown, Urban Strides, Craig McLeish, The Young Voices House Band | Young Voices | Concert | |
| 6 February | Young Voices 2026 | Alex Spencer, Ruti, YolanDa Brown, Urban Strides, Craig McLeish, The Young Voices House Band | Young Voices | Concert | |
| 12 February | Young Voices 2026 | Alex Spencer, Ruti, YolanDa Brown, Urban Strides, Craig McLeish, The Young Voices House Band | Young Voices | Concert | |
| 18 February | Raye | Amma, Absolutely | This Tour May Contain New Music | Concert | |
| 20 February | Florence + the Machine | Paris Paloma, Dionne | Everybody Scream Tour | Concert | |
| 21 February | James Athur | -- | Bitter Sweet Love Tour | Concert | |
| 28 February | Brit Awards 2026 | Jack Whitehall, Harry Styles, Olivia Dean, Rosalía, Raye, Wolf Alice, Alex Warren, Sombr, HUNTR/X, Mark Ronson, Robbie Williams, Björk | Brit Awards | Award Show | First time the BRITs were hosted outside of London |
| 4 March | Laufey | Alice Phoebe Lou | A Matter of Time Tour | Concert | Jeff Goldblum came out as a Special Guest and played Piano for the track 'Misty' |
| 6 March | Harry Styles | -- | One Night Only | Concert | Phones were banned, it was also a one night only show for the release of his new album, Kiss All The Time. Disco, Occasionally and it was recorded for the Netflix movie Harry Styles. One Night In Manchester |
| 7 March | MGK | Julia Wolf | Lost Americana Tour | Concert | |
| 16 March | Dave | Lost Boys, Kano | The Boy Who Played The Harp Tour | Concert | |
| 17 March | Dave | Lost Boys, Kano | The Boy Who Played The Harp Tour | Concert | |
| 19 March | Wu-Tang Clan | Havoc, DJ Target | The Final Chamber | Concert | |
| 20 March | Gorillaz | Omar Souleyman, Yasiin Bey, Bootie Brown, Posdnos, Kara Jackson, Joe Talbot, Michelle Ndegwa | The Mountain Tour | Concert | |
| 21 March | Gorillaz | Omar Souleyman, Yasiin Bey, Bootie Brown, Kara Jackson, Posdnos | The Mountain Tour | Concert | |
| 26 March | MOBO Awards 2026 | FLO, Slick Rick, Estelle, Olivia Dean, DJ Target, Wiley, CHIP, NoLay, Scorcher, D Double E, Tiwa Savage, Myles Smith, Aitch, Shenseea | MOBO Awards | Award Show | |
| 28 March | Moses Itauma vs. Jermaine Franklin | Boxing Undercard | DAZN | Sport | Meekz performed a walkout song |
| 4 April | 5 Seconds of Summer | South Arcade, Haiden Henderson | Everyone's A Star Tour | Concert | |
| 16 April | The Prodigy | Carl Cox | UK & Ireland Arena Tour | Concert | |
| 17 April | Rick Astley | Gabrielle | The Reflection Tour 2026 | Concert | |
| 18 April | James | Doves | Love Is The Answer Tour | Concert | |
| 23 April | Sugar For The Bee, MOLI, The Drop Jonnies, STRANGE WOMAN | -- | Battle of the Bands | Concert | Charity event |
| 24 April | Louis Tomlinson | Pale Waves, ADMT | How Did We Get Here Tour | Concert | |
| 25 April | Olivia Dean | Kokoroko | The Art Of Loving Live | Concert | |
| 26 April | Olivia Dean | Jalen Ngonda | The Art Of Loving Live | Concert | |
| 27 April | Alex Warren | Claire Rosinkranz | Finding Family on the Road Tour | Concert | |
| 1 May | Ne-Yo, Akon | Just Yaz | Nights Like This Tour | Concert | |
| 2 May | Ne-Yo, Akon | DJ Chaise | Nights Like This Tour | Concert | |
| 4 May | Alex Warren | Clair Rosinkranz | Finding Family on the Road Tour | Concert | |
| 6 May | Ne-Yo, Akon | Katbrownsugar | Nights Like This Tour | Concert | |
| 8 May | Tame Impala | RIP Magic | Deadbeat Tour | Concert | |
| 9 May | Fabio Wardley vs. Daniel Dubois | Boxing Undercard | "Don't Blink" WBO Heavyweight Championship | Sport | Massive Title Fight |
| 23 May | Doja Cat | Naomi Sharon | Tour Ma Vie World Tour | Concert | |
| 25 May | Manchester City | Noel Gallagher, Doves, Blossoms, Alex Spencer, Sam Divine, Mike Joyce | -- | After Party | Hybrid celebration event that combined a live concert, player stage show and an emotional farewell ceremony for manager, Pep Guardiola |
| 31 May | Madison Beer | Isabel LaRosa, Lulu Simon | The Locket Tour | Concert | |
| 20 June | Netball Super League Grand Final | Manchester Thunder vs London Pulse | 2026 Netball Super League Season | Sport | First time the Netball Final was held at the Co-op Live, Manchester Thunder won the competition |
| 23 June | Kaytranada | Uncle Waffles | UK and EU Arena Tour supporting his album 'Ain't No Damn Way!' | Concert | |
| 27 June | Robyn | 808 State, Zhala | The Sexistential Tour | Concert | |
| 4 July | Kings Of Leon | The Snuts | UK and EU Arena Tour supporting their ninth studio album 'Can We Please Have Fun' | Concert | |
| 6 July | Def Leppard | Extreme | Live 2026 | Concert | |
| 16 August | Joji | Tommy Richman | Solaris Tour | Concert | |
| 1 September | The Neighbourhood | Nessa Barrett, Noise Dept | The World Tour | Concert | |
| 4 September | Daniel Caesar | -- | Son of Spergy Tour | Concert | |
| 5 September | A$AP Rocky | -- | Don't Be Dumb World Tour | Concert | |
| 6 September | Katseye | -- | The Wildworld Tour | Concert | Sparked controversy about families not being let in. |
| 10 September | Evanescence | Poppy, K. Flay | Evanescence 2026 World Tour | Concert | |
| 11 September | André Rieu | Johann Strauss Orchestra | André Rieu & his Johann Strauss Orchestra | Concert | |
| 12 September | Melanine Martinez | IDER | Hades: The Sacrifice | Concert | |
| 16 September | Spiritbox | Jinjer, Dying Wish | Tsunami Sea Tour | Concert | |
| 19 September | John Hedges vs. Pat Brown | Boxing Undercard | DAZN | Sport | Great Expectations - British & Commonwealth Cruiserweight Titles |
| 20 September | Delhi Dosanjh | -- | Aura World Tour | Concert | |
| 25 September | Niall Horan | flowerovlove | Dinner Party Live on Tour | Concert | Brought out Blossoms frontman Tom Ogden |
| 3 October | Franklin Graham | Faith Child, Charity Gayle, Micheal W. Smith | God Loves You Tour | Concert with a gospel message | Christian Event |
| 7 October | Hans Zimmer | -- | World of Hans Zimmer, A New Dimension | Concert | |
| 8 October | Karan Aujla | Ikky | P-Pop Culture World Tour | Concert | |
| 9 October | Professor Brian Cox | -- | Emergence | Lecture | |
| 10 October | The Pussycat Dolls | Lil' Kim, Deja Vu | PCD Forever | Concert | |
| 15 October | Barack Obama | -- | An Evening With President Barack Obama | Discussion | |
| 23 October | Westlife | -- | The Anniversary World Tour | Concert | |
| 24 October | Westlife | -- | The Anniversary World Tour | Concert | |
| 25 October | Westlife | -- | The Anniversary World Tour | Concert | |
| 26 October | The Strokes | Fat White Family, Alex Cameron | Reality Awaits Global Tour | Concert | |
| 28 October | J.Cole | -- | The Fall-Off Tour | Concert | |
| 29 October | J.Cole | -- | The Fall-Off Tour | Concert | |
| 30 October | The Reytons | Alex Spencer, Cruz Beckham & The Breakers | UK and EU Arena Tour supporting their fourth studio album 'A Love Letter To A Broken Town' | Concert | |
| 31 October | Manic Street Preachers & Suede | -- | Manic Street Preachers and Suede Co-Headline UK Arena Tour | Concert | Halloween Show |
| 6 November | Papa Roach | Landmvrks, Sleep Theory | Rise of the Roach Tour | Concert | |
| 7 November | The Script | James Morrison | Man in the Arena Tour | Concert | |
| 8 November | Stevie Wonder | -- | Songs In The Key of Life Performances - 50th Anniversary Tour | Concert | |
| 12 November | Muse | Dead Poet Society | The WOW! Signal Europa Tour | Concert | |
| 13 November | Muse | Dead Poet Society | The WOW! Signal Europa Tour | Concert | |
| 14 Novemver | Paul Heaton | The Lighting Seeds | UK Arena Tour supporting his album 'Jenius' | Concert | |
| 15 November | Myles Smith | Chance Peña | My Mess. My Heart. My Life. World Tour | Concert | |
| 19 November | Enter Shikari | Holding Absence, The Callous Daoboys | | Concert | |
| 20 Novemver | Good Charlotte | Yellowcard | Motel Du Cap Tour | Concert | |
| 21 November | Hits Radio Live 2026 | Take That, Jason Derulo, Tom Grennan, Paloma Faith, James Blunt, Blue, Katy B, December 10 | Hits Radio | Concert | |
| 22 November | Don Toliver | -- | Nitrous World Tour | Concert | |
| 26 November | Phoebe Bridgers | Isaac Wood | The Lost Tour 2026 | Concert | |
| 27 November | Jungle | Rio Kosta | Sunshine World Tour | Concert | |
| 28 November | Blossoms | The Royston Club | Songs From The Wedding Cake Tour | Concert | |
| 2 December | Mariah Carey | DJ Suss One | Mariah Carey's Christmas Time | Concert | |
| 3 December | Bryson Tiller | Majid Jordan | The Neo Trapsoul Tour | Concert | |
| 4 December | Placebo | The Hunger | Placebo: 30th Anniversary Tour | Concert | |
| 5 December | Jessie Ware | Tsatsamis | The Superbloom Tour | Concert | |
| 6 December | UB40 | Ali Campbell, Katchafire | Big Love Tour | Concert | |
| 10 December | Kehlani | Odeal, Waseel | The Kehlani World Tour | Concert | |
| 11 December | Blossoms | The Royston Club | Songs From The Wedding Cake Tour | Concert | |
| 12 December | The Lord Of The Rings | -- | Celebrating the 25th anniversary of the iconic Academy Award-winning film, The Lord of the Rings | Concert | |
| 18 December | Jamie T | -- | Ghosts UK Tour | Concert | |
| 19 December | Kasabian | The Vaccines | Nothing Better Than This Tour | Concert | |
2027
| 9 January | Jack Whitehall | -- | Bad Influence Tour | Comedy | |
| 17 January | NBA: Regular Season Game | New Orleans Pelicans vs. San Antonio Spurs | NBA | Sport | |
| 22 January | WWE Friday Night Smackdown | Undisputed WWE Champion CM Punk, Women’s World Champion Liv Morgan, “The American Nightmare” Cody Rhodes, Seth “Freakin” Rollins, World Tag Team Champions The Vision and many more | WWE | Sport | |
| 23 January | Electric Callboy | Bloodywood | Tanzneid World Tour 2027 | Concert | |
| 24 January | Donny Osmond | -- | Viva UK | Concert | |
| 29 January | A Boogie Wit Da Hoodie | -- | 10 Years of Artist Tour | | |
| 31 January | A Boogie Wit Da Hoodie | -- | 10 Years of Artist Tour | | |
| 3 February | Songs Of Freedom | Bob Geldof, The Doobie Brothers, Madness, Chrissie Hynde, The Lathums, Nick Lowe, Lottery Winners, Peter Hook & the Light, Chris Difford, Midge Ure, Brooke Combe, Alabama 3, Insipiral Carpets, Johnny & The Hardwickes, Graham Parker, The Molotovs, The Blockheads, Yee Loi, Springbok Nude Girls, Davina Michelle, Joe King Carrasco, Boombox, Within Temptation, Lindisfarne, Schmalgauzen, Songs For Ukraine Choir London Metropolitan Orchestra and many more by video and TBA. | Benefit Concert For The Women & Children Of Ukraine | Charity Concert | |
| 12 February | Nothing But Thieves | -- | The Stray Dogs World Tour | Concert | |
| 17 February | Charli XCX | Audrey Hobert | Music, Fashion, Film Tour | Concert | |
| 27 February | Brit Awards 2027 | TBA | Brit Awards | Award Show | Celebrating 50 Years of the Brits |
| 6 March | Dominic Fike | -- | Comedy Tragedy Parody Tour | Concert | |
| 9 March | N-Dubz | -- | The Legacy Tour | Concert | 360° Stage |
| 11 March | N-Dubz | -- | The Legacy Tour | Concert | 360° Stage |
| 12 March | Rush | -- | Fifty Something UK 2027 Tour | Concert | |
| 13 March | Megadeth | Black Label Society, Testament | Hibernation of the Nations Tour | Concert | |
| 14 March | Rush | -- | Fifty Something UK 2027 Tour | Concert | |
| 19 March | Chase & Status | -- | The Live Show 2027 | Concert | |
| 26 March | Sonny Federa | -- | "can we do it all again?" tour | Concert | |
| 27 March | Sub Focus | -- | Circular Sound Tour | Concert | |
| 2 April | Trivium & In Flames | PALEFACE SWISS, VOLA | In Flames + Trivium Europe 2027 | Concert | |
| 3 April | James Blunt | -- | Airplane Mode Tour | Concert | |
| 16 April | Teddy Swims | -- | The Ugly Tour | Concert | |
| 17 April | Teddy Swims | -- | The Ugly Tour | Concert | |
| 18 April | Teddy Swims | -- | The Ugly Tour | Concert | |
| 22 April | Gracie Abrams | Samia | The Look At My Life Tour | Concert | |
| 24 April | Gracie Abrams | Samia | The Look At My Life Tour | Concert | |
| 25 April | Gracie Abrams | Samia | The Look At My Life Tour | Concert | |
| 29 April | Thirty Seconds To Mars | -- | European Tour 2027 | Concert | |
| 2 May | John Bishop | -- | Let's Go Round Again | Comedy | |
| 6 May | Rod Stewart | Howard Jones | The Final Encore | Concert | |
| 7 May | Simple Minds | Gary Numan | Simple Minds V Tour 2027 | Concert | |
| 8 May | Rod Stewart | The Howard Jones | The Final Encore | Concert | |
| 9 May | Interstellar Live With Hans Zimmer | Martin Gellner, Roger Sayer | | Concert | |
| 15 May | Weezer | Taking Back Sunday | The Gathering World Tour | Concert | |
| 28 May | Tame Impala | Wetleg | Deadbeat Tour | Concert | 360° Stage |
| 29 May | Tame Impala | Wetleg | Deadbeat Tour | Concert | 360° Stage |
| 1 June | Greta Van Fleet | Larkin Poe | Greta Van Fleet Into The Beginning | Concert | |
| 2 June | Nickelback | Don Broco | Everything Under The Sun Tour | Concert | |
| 3 June | Fall Out Boy | A Day To Remember, Neck Deep | Twilight Of The Punks Tour | Concert | |
| 6 June | Fall Out Boy | A Day To Remember, Neck Deep | Twilight Of The Punks Tour | Concert | |
| 9 July | Scorpions | EUROPE | Love, Peace & Rock 'n' Roll 2027 World Tour | Concert | |
| 5 October | Andrea Bocelli | -- | Andrea Bocelli Live in Concert | Concert | |
| 20 October | Anna Lapwood | -- | The Arena Tour | Concert | |
| 21 October | Jean-Michel Jarre | -- | OXYGENE & BEYOND Tour | Concert | |
| 22 October | Deacon Blue | -- | UK and Ireland Arena Tour marking the 40th Anniversary of their album 'Raintown' | Concert | |
| 29 October | Texas | Del Amitri | 30th Anniversary of White on Blonde + The Hits | Concert | |
| 30 October | Billy Ocean | Tony Hadley, Heather Small | 50 Years of Red Light Spells Danger Tour | Concert | |
| 2 November | Powerwolf | Apocalyptica, Majestica | Moral & Madness World Tour | Concert | |

== See also ==
- List of indoor arenas in the United Kingdom
- Etihad Campus
- Manchester Arena
