= Bright Light Bright Light discography =

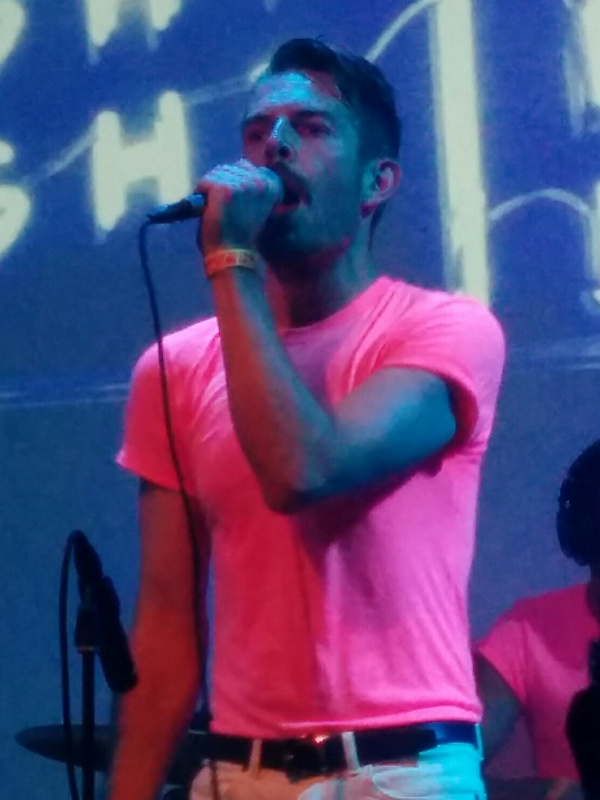
- Bright Light Bright Light live in 2016
- Studio albums: 5
- EPs: 17
- Soundtrack albums: 1
- Live albums: 2
- Singles: 47
- Music videos: 37
- Remix albums: 5
- Other albums: 5

Welsh independent singer-songwriter Rod Thomas, best known by his stage name Bright Light Bright Light has released five studio albums, five remix albums, two live albums, one soundtrack album, five other albums (including a reissue, compilation, an album released under his real name, and two re-recordings), seventeen extended plays (EPs), forty-seven singles and thirty-seven music videos.

== Albums ==
=== Studio albums ===
List of albums, with release date and label shown
Title	Details	Peak chart positions			
Title	Details	UK	UK Indie	UK Dance	SCO
Until Something Fits (as Rod Thomas)	Released: March 2009; Label: Self Raising Records (SRR04CD); Format: CD, digital download	–	–	–	–
Make Me Believe in Hope	Released: 2012; Label: Self Raising Records / The Blue Team (BLUETEAM8); Format: CD, digital download, LP	–	29	–	–
Life Is Easy	Released: July 2014; Label: Self Raising Records (SRR15CD); Format: CD, digital download, LP	139	19	–	–
Choreography	Released: July 2016; Label: Self Raising Records (SRR30CD); Format: CD, digital download, 2xLP, cassette, streaming	72	11	–	62
Fun City	Released: 18 September 2020; Label: YSKWN! (YSKWN005CD); Format: CD, LP, digital download, streaming	–	3	1	27
Enjoy Youth	Scheduled: 17 May 2024; Label: YSKWN!; Format: CD, LP, cassette, digital download, streaming	60	3	–	10

=== Remix albums ===
List of remix albums, with release date and label shown
Title	Details
Make Me Believe in Hope – B-Sides, Remixes and Rarities	Released: 2013; Label: Self Raising Records; Format: CD
Make Me Believe in Hope – Blueprints Version	Released: 2013; Label: Self Raising Records (SRR11CD); Format: CD, digital download, cassette
Life Is Hard – The Remixes	Released: June 2015; Label: Self Raising Records (SRR26CD); Format: CD, digital download, 2xLP

=== Soundtrack albums ===
Title	Details
All Man: The International Male Story (Original Score)	Released: 30 June 2023; Label: YSKWN! (YSKWN018LP); Format: 2xLP, digital download, streaming

=== Live albums ===
List of live albums, with release date and label shown
Title	Details
Live at Mercury Lounge NYC	Released: January 2015; Label: Bright Light Bright Light; Format: digital download; Recorded live in January 2015
Live Is Easy (Live On Tour with Erasure)	Released: April 2018; Label: Self Raising Records (SRR52CD); Format: CD, digital download; Recorded live in 2018

=== Reissues, compilations and other albums ===
List of other albums, with release date and label shown
Title	Details	Peak chart positions	
Title	Details	UK Indie	UK Dance
Solo Piano Versions	Released: 2016; Label: Bright Light Bright Light; Format: digital download	–	–
Choreography (Stripped Down Version)	Released: February 2021; Label: Bright Light Bright Light; Format: digital download	–	–
So Gay. So Dramatic	Released: June 2021; Label: YSKWN! (YSKWN009CD); Format: 2xCD, 2xLP, digital download, streaming	26	14
Make Me Believe in Hope (10th Anniversary Edition)	Released: 3 June 2022; Label: YSKWN!; Format: CD, digital download, streaming	–	–
Enjoy Youth (Enjoy More: Deluxe Version)	Released: 4 April 2025; Label: YSKWN!; Format: CD, digital download, streaming	To Be Released	

== Extended plays ==
List of EP, with release date and label shown
Title	Details
A Few Songs EP (as Rod Thomas)	Released: 2005; Label: Self Raising Records (SRRCD01); Format: CD
Playroom EP (as Rod Thomas with si-cut.db)	Released: 2008; Label: Rod Thomas; Format: CDr
The Festivals EP (as Rod Thomas)	Released: 2008; Label: Rod Thomas; Format: CDr
Limited Edition EP	Released: October 2009; Label: Bright Light Bright Light; Format: CDr
Blue Prints	Released: 2012 (US release only); Label: The Blue Team; Format: Digital download
All That Matters EP	Released: December 2013; Label: The Blue Team; Format: Digital download
Matters: EP & Non Album Tracks	Released: 2014; Label: Self Raising Records; Format: Digital download
Tour EP 2014	Released: 2014; Label: Bright Light Bright Light; Format: Digital download, Cdr
Joe's Pub April 2014	Released: 2014; Label: Bright Light Bright Light; Format: Digital download
Cinematography	Released: November 2016; Label: Self Raising Records (SRR39CD); Format: CD, digital download, streaming
Choreography Remixes	Released: 2017; Label: Self Raising Records; Format: CD, digital download, streaming
Cinematography II: Back in the Habit	Released: April 2017; Label: Self Raising Records (SRR43CD); Format: CD, digital download, streaming
Tales of the City	Released: July 2017; Label: Self Raising Records (SRR47CD); Format: CD, digital download, streaming
Cinematography III: Merry Christmas You Filthy Animal	Released: December 2017; Label: Self Raising Records (SRR49CD); Format: CD, digital download, streaming
Tough Love	Released: September 2018; Label: Self Raising Records (SRR56CD); Format: CD, digital download, streaming
Quiet City	Released: 12 February 2021; Label: YSKWN!; Format: digital download, streaming
How Queer	Released: 27 August 2021; Label: YSKWN!; Format: digital download, streaming
Cinematography IV: The Final Chapter	Released: 25 September 2026; Label: Self Raising Records; Format: digital download, streaming

== Singles ==
List of singles, with year released and album name shown
Year	Title	UK Physical Singles	Album
Credited as Rod Thomas
2006	"Good Coat"	—	Until Something Fits
2007	"Your Love Is a Tease"	—	Until Something Fits
2008	"You Get Goodbyes"	—	Until Something Fits
2008	"Same Old Lines"	—	Until Something Fits
Credited as Bright Light Bright Light
2010	"A New Word to Say"	—	Make Me Believe in Hope
2010	"Love Part II"	20	Make Me Believe in Hope
2011	"Disco Moment"	18	Make Me Believe in Hope
2012	"Waiting for the Feeling"	—	Make Me Believe in Hope
2012	"Feel It" (featuring Mykal Kilgore)	—	Make Me Believe in Hope
2013	"Moves"	—	Make Me Believe in Hope
2013	"In Your Care"	—	Life Is Easy
2014	"I Wish We Were Leaving" (with Elton John)	—	Life Is Easy
2014	"I Believe"	—	Life Is Easy
2014	"An Open Heart"	—	Life Is Easy
2014	"Everything I Ever Wanted"(with The Pink Singers)	—	Life Is Easy
2015	"There Are No Miracles"	—	Life Is Easy
2015	"Good Luck" (featuring Ana Matronic)	—	Life Is Hard: The Remixes
2015	"Blood Moon (I Did Give You Love)"	—	Non-album single
2016	"All in the Name" (featuring Elton John)	—	Choreography
2016	"Symmetry of Two Hearts" (featuring Elton John)	—	Choreography
2017	"Running Back to You" (featuring Elton John)	—	Choreography
2017	"Into the Night"	3	Choreography
2017	"I Only Wanna Please You" (featuring Ana Matronic)	—	Choreography
2017	"Put a Little Love in Your Heart" (with Nerina Pallot)	—	Cinematography 3: Merry Christmas You Filthy Animal
2018	"Little Bit"	—	Choreography
2018	"Nos Cœurs Symétriques"	—	Non-album single
2018	"Tough Love"	—	Tough Love EP
2018	"Uh Huh"	—	Tough Love EP
2019	"Wild"(with Final DJs)	—	Non-album single
2020	"This Was My House" (featuring Niki Haris, Donna De Lory & Initial Talk)	—	Fun City
2020	"I Used to Be Cool"	—	Fun City
2020	"It's Alright, It's OK" (featuring Caveboy)	—	Fun City
2020	"Good At Goodbyes" (featuring Andy Bell)	—	Fun City
2020	"Saying Goodbye Is Exhausting" (featuring Justin Vivian Bond)	—	Fun City
2021	"Being Sentimental"	—	So Gay. So Dramatic
2021	"Arms of Another" (featuring Milly Blue & Sophie Galpin)	—	So Gay. So Dramatic
2021	"These Dreams" (featuring The Illustrious Blacks)	—	Red Hot + Free (Red Hot Org Compilation)
2022	"Man Like Me"	—	Make Me Believe in Hope (10th Anniversary Edition)
2022	"Moves" (feat. Ian "H" Watkins)	—	Make Me Believe in Hope (10th Anniversary Edition)
2022	"I Don't Know What I'm Gonna Do"	—	Enjoy Youth
2023	"Sweet Release"	—	Enjoy Youth
2023	"Boys Etc"	—	Enjoy Youth
2023	"Down To One"	—	Enjoy Youth
2024	"You Want My..."	—	Enjoy Youth
2024	"Every Emotion"(with Ultra Naté)	—	Enjoy Youth
2024	"Heartslap" (with Mykal Kilgore)	—	Enjoy Youth
2024	"Too Funky" (with 808 BEACH)	—	Pride Favourites
2024	"Bye Bye" (with Initial Talk)	—	Non-album single
2024	"Snap!" (with Berri)	—	Enjoy Youth
2025	"Sunny" (feat. Beth Hirsch & Nerina Pallot)	—	Non-album single
2025	"Enjoy Youth (Welsh Version)" (with Donna Lewis)	—	Enjoy Youth (Enjoy More: Deluxe Version)
2025	"La Jeunesse" (with Beth Hirsch)	—	Enjoy Youth (Enjoy More: Deluxe Version)
2025	"Revived"	—	Enjoy Youth
2025	"Boys Etc."	—	Enjoy Youth
2026	"Where is the Heartache"	—	Non-album single
2026	"Love Song for a Vampire"	—	Cinematography IV: The Final Chapter
2026	"I Want Your (Hands on Me)"	—	Cinematography IV: The Final Chapter

== Music videos ==
Title	Year	Director	Ref.
Love Part II	2010	Tom Levinge	
Disco Moment	2011	Jody Wilson	
Waiting for the Feeling	2012	Alun Davies	
A New Word To Say	2012	Hollie Newton	
Feel It	2012	Dave Goldstein	
How To Make A Heart	2013	Gavin Leisfield	
Moves	2013	Paul Frankl	
Grace (feat. Beth Hirsch)	2013	Rod Thomas	
Debris	2013	Gavin Leisfield	
Blueprint	2013	–	
An Open Heart	2013	Gavin Leisfield	
In Your Care	2013	Thomas O'Connor	
I Wish We Were Leaving (with Elton John)	2014	Johnny Lochland	
I Believe	2014	Andrew Ellmaker & Blake Martin	
Everything I Ever Wanted (with The Pink Singers)	2014	–	
There Are No Miracles	2015	–	
Good Luck (with Ana Matronic)	2015	James Barker, Rod Thomas & Del Marquis	
All in the Name (feat. Elton John)	2016	Rod Thomas & Santiago Felipe	
Symmetry Of Two Hearts (feat. Elton John)	2016	Rod Thomas & Santiago Felipe	
Running Back to You (feat. Elton John)	2017	Rod Thomas & Santiago Felipe	
New York Pretty	2017	Rod Thomas & Daniel Robinson	
Into the Night	2017	Rod Thomas & Daniel Robinson	
I Only Want To Please You (with Ana Matronic)	2017	Rod Thomas & Matthew Canada	
This Was My House	2020	Tyler Jensen	
I Used To Be Cool	2020	Tyler Jensen	
It's Alright, It's OK (with Caveboy)	2020	Tyler Jensen	
Saying Goodbye Is Exhausting (with Justin Vivian Bond)	2020	Tyler Jensen	
Being Sentimental	2021	–	
Arms Of Another	2021	Rod Thomas & Sven Serkis	
Uh Huh!	2021	Richert Schnorr	
Moves (feat. Ian "H" Watkins)	2022	Paul Frankl	
Cry at Films	2022	Tyler Jensen	
Sweet Release	2023	–	
Down To One	2023	Tyler Jensen	
You Want My ...	2024	Tyler Milliron	
Every Emotion (with Ultra Naté)	2024	Ultra Naté	
Heartslap (with Mykal Kilgore)	2024	Tyler Milliron	
