= VoicePlay =

American a cappella ensemble

- Also known as: 4 The Love; 4:2:Five
- Origin: Orlando, Florida
- Genre: A cappella
- Years active: 1997–present
- Members: Geoff Castellucci; Layne Stein; Eli Jacobson; Cesar de la Rosa; J.None
- Past members: Earl Elkins Jr; Mykal Kilgore; Scott Porter; James May; Dave Baumgartner; Matthew Buckner; Ryan Reed; Danny Alan; Tony Wakim
- Website: Official website

YouTube information
- Years active: 2012 - present
- Genre: acapella
- Subscribers: 1.74 million
- Views: 470.33 million
- Last updated: September 19, 2026

VoicePlay is an a cappella band based in Orlando, Florida with a world-wide audience. Having turned down a major label to remain an a cappella band, they are independent artists. The band consists of Geoff Castellucci (bass), Layne Stein (vocal percussion), Eli Jacobson (tenor 1), Cesar de la Rosa (tenor 2), and J.None (baritone). Active since 1997 they progressed through several lineup changes, and in that time won multiple local, regional, and national awards both for live performances and music videos, including from Contemporary A Cappella Society. VoicePlay performed shows and tours both nationally and internationally, was on the Today Show, heard on the radio, and performed for large companies such as Disney, Universal and Paramount. They were a finalist in the fourth season of The Sing-Off on NBC, performed live with several notable musicians including Chicago, and grew a large online following on multiple platforms. Self-described as "Original. Imaginative. Ridiculous. A Cappella", their live shows and some music videos mix both comedy and music. They are considered one of the best a cappella groups by industry professional Deke Sharon. They are primarily a cover band though they have also produced original songs.

== History ==
=== Early years ===
VoicePlay began in 1997 in the Orlando, Florida metro area as a group of middle school friends. Geoff Castellucci, Layne Stein, Earl Elkins Jr. and Mykal Kilgore all attended Lake Howell High School and began singing barbershop-style together under the name 4 The Love. Scott Porter, also a Lake Howell graduate, joined in 1998 as a vocal percussionist making them a group of five, and their name changed to 4:2:Five.

Since Kilgore was a couple years younger than the other members, he left the group when the rest graduated from their high school and headed off to college. (Most of them attended Valencia Community College and University of Central Florida.) Their friend James May joined in 1999 as a tenor. Porter left in 2003 for a six-month contract at Tokyo Disneyland, then spent a couple years performing in off-Broadway shows before being cast in Friday Night Lights. Dave Baumgartner temporarily joined to replace Porter as the vocal percussionist for two tours the group already had booked. When his time with them was done, Stein switched from baritone to vocal percussion, where he has remained ever since. Matthew "Bucky" Buckner joined as their new baritone in 2004, and stayed until 2006 when he left to star in the national tour of Altar Boyz. He was replaced by one of the guys' theme park colleagues, Ryan Reed. When May stepped away in 2007, he was replaced by Danny Alan in the second tenor spot. Alan resigned from the group in 2010, replaced by Eli Jacobson, who had been friends with Porter since high school, and who the others had known both socially and professionally. After Reed also left in 2011, Tony Wakim then joined as their new baritone.

Throughout these membership changes, the group continued singing together, working their way up from singing on street corners and bookstores. As teenagers the group was considered "wonderful" and "exceptional" by Paul Chiaravalle of Walt Disney Entertainment management.

=== Live performances and touring ===
VoicePlay then spent years performing for theme parks including Disney World, Universal Studios Orlando, SeaWorld Orlando, and Busch Gardens. They entertained on cruises including Disney, and worked around the Orlando area including House of Blues, fairs and festivals, conventions, and private events. They have received air time on the radio. VoicePlay also made eight national tours, including two tours with The Sing-Off Live! Tour, which included playing at The Ryman and at least one international tour. They've opened for bands like 98 Degrees, collaborated with bands like Chicago and been headliners themselves. They became known for not just standing and singing during their live shows, but also including both humor and skits interwoven with musical numbers in an almost theatrical manner.

=== The Sing-Off ===
VoicePlay was noticed and recommended by Golden Globe Director Sam Weisman during auditions for The Sing-Off Season 1 in 2009, though they did not actually compete until season 4. "Well there was this one group from Florida called 4:2:Five (...) I fell in love with their version of the now famous, made famous by Glee song 'Don't Stop Believing'."

While competing in 2013's Season 4 show as a six-member group including Honey LaRochelle, they were eliminated together with AcoUstiKats as part of a double elimination night, with both groups coming in 5th & 6th place. They were then chosen as one of three groups to go on the national The Sing-Off Live! Tour, and were the only group to make the lineup for two years running. They were also listed as an influence for a later group competing on the show.

=== Transition to social media and online growth ===
While still touring, they changed their name to VoicePlay (announced May 28, 2012) and began their YouTube channel also in 2012 as a way of demonstrating their talent to prospective clients. Considered an early adopter of video in the a cappella world, this helped them have several viral videos and resulted in a worldwide fanbase. In 2017 their online following was considered "sizable" and at least one video had passed the 1 million views mark. By 2019 they had reached 500k YouTube subscribers. Ever since the COVID-19 pandemic required a discontinuation of touring in 2020, VoicePlay has chosen to remain focused mostly on music video production. By 2021 they had reached 1 million subscribers. As of the time of writing in March 2026 their YouTube channel stands at 1.69M subscribers, TikTok at 1.3M followers, Instagram at 764K followers and Spotify at 256k listeners. They have also been featured on other YouTube channels such as the official Disney on Broadway channel and on sites like video.Disney.com.

VoicePlay also occasionally creates commissioned music videos, examples of which are working with Paramount in 2019 to create an "Impossible Carol" inspired by the Mission: Impossible theme song, "Party Of Your Lifetime" from the Warframe game for gaming company Digital Extremes, and "Shero Returns" for PUBG Mobile. They also created a video short for Honkai: Star Rail, and participated in the 2021 Genshin Impact Concert.

During 2016 Tony Wakim left the group, and music videos on their YouTube channel from this timeframe include various members of the group duplicated digitally as the fifth singer, and a video request for auditions. Wakim, together with Stein, formed a production studio called PattyCake Productions which VoicePlay frequently uses as a location to film their music videos. Jessie Nunn, known as J.None, was introduced and announced as the new fifth member on March 29, 2018, via a video on their YouTube channel, and from that point was listed as their fifth member.

As their online releases increased, VoicePlay gradually stopped producing new songs directly for albums and switched to new songs and music videos being released first online, with a few compilation albums following later (see VoicePlay Discography).

On July 9, 2020, VoicePlay announced that Earl will no longer perform with the group and they will continue to make music as a quartet with guest artists. Almost a year later there is a video titled "FAREWELL J.NONE Behind The Scenes" released May 8, 2021 announcing J.None's retirement from VoicePlay in order to join the United States Navy, where he went on to sing for the U.S. Navy Band Sea Chanters chorus. After these two vacancies VoicePlay was a three-member group for just a few months, until the video announcing Cesar De La Rosa as a new member released on July 17, 2021, since which he has been listed as the fourth member. All music videos and live performances from that point forward included various featured artists as the fifth singer, until it was announced publicly in September 2026 via a short music video that J.None had officially returned as a member.

=== Infrequent live performances ===
VoicePlay does not often perform live for public shows anymore, though videos do occasionally surface revealing them performing at private events, such as for Disney at the IPW 2022. However, in November 2023 VoicePlay did return to the live stage with Chicago in a public show at Atlantic City's Ocean Casino Resort celebrating Chicago's 55th anniversary of their debut album. This show was then filmed and debuted in theatres the following April as "Chicago & Friends in Concert". "Another highlight from the shows was the vocal group VoicePlay performing such Chicago songs as 'Look Away,' 'If You Leave Me Now' and 'Happy Man' with the band in an semi-acoustic setting. 'At various times, we do an unplugged segment ourselves on stage just to sort of break it up,' Loughnane says. 'It was great to hear how they approached our songs and how we were able to blend the two bands together.'" VoicePlay also performed "Wishing You Were Here" as their fourth song with Chicago.

== Music and video style ==
VoicePlay performs a cappella covers and occasional originals of a wide variety of genres and from multiple eras, usually with an overall contemporary pop sound. Some of the genres they have covered include: barbershop, jazz, rock, pop, country, Disney music, metal, rhythm and blues, funk, hip-hop doo-wop, soul, Broadway music, and holiday tunes.

VoicePlay have always had a passion for a cappella music in particular. While still 4:2:Five, they were offered a record deal from Sony, but walked when executives wanted to add backing tracks. However, they have performed with the occasional musical instrument. In covers such as "Until I Found You" Castellucci plays piano and in "Nothing Else Matters" Stein plays violin. When using only their voices, they try to arrange in a way that sounds like a full band, often switching up which member is singing lead throughout the course of the song. They also have an affinity for Halloween, with a discography including many Halloween themed or related songs.

VoicePlay often shoots professional-looking music videos to go along with the release of new music. They do much of the video production themselves, having developed the required audio recording, lighting, camera and technology skills over time, partially by figuring things out on their own and partially learning from other musicians in the field such as Andrew Heermans and Jeff Thacher. Thacher is listed as the producer, recorder and mixer of their debut 4:2:Five EP, and received credit for the art direction and design of some of their albums.

== Personnel ==
VoicePlay's membership has fluctuated with their total membership having gotten as low as three and as high as six. Two of the founding members still remain. When short members, the group filled in any needed vocal parts for each song temporarily with former members, collaborators, or for studio pieces sometimes layered/duplicated one of their own voices.

=== Current members ===
- Geoff Castellucci - bass (1997–present)
- Layne Stein - vocal percussion (2003-present) was baritone (1997-2003) (1997–present)
- Eli Jacobson - tenor 1 (2026–present) was tenor 2 (2010-2026)
- Jessie Nunn known as J.None - baritone (2018–2021, 2026–present)
- Cesar de la Rosa - tenor 2 (2026–present) was baritone (2021-2026)

=== Past members ===
- Earl Elkins Jr - tenor 1 (1997–2020)
- Mykal Kilgore - tenor 2 (1997–1999)
- Scott Porter - vocal percussion (1998–2003)
- James May - tenor 2 (1999–2007)
- Dave Baumgartner - vocal percussion (2003)
- Matthew "Bucky" Buckner - baritone (2004–2006)
- Ryan Reed - baritone (2006–2010)
- Danny Alan - tenor 2 (2007–2010)
- Tony Wakim - baritone (2011–2016)

=== Collaborators and featured artists ===
VoicePlay has collaborated with many artists over the years, a few of which are Scott Porter (further music videos were made after Porter had left membership), Rachel Potter and Chicago. VoicePlay will sometimes add additional singers for arrangements with over five parts, to fill in for missing members when VoicePlay were short members themselves, to reinterpret another artist's piece in an a cappella style along with them, or to work together with two entire bands. Some notable repeating collaborators are Deejay Young, Adriana Arellano, Ashley Diane, Anthony Gargiula, Omar Cardona, E.J. Cardona, Jose Rosario Jr., Emoni Wilkins, Tim Foust, and John Pinto Jr.

== Discography ==
- 4:2:Five E.P. (2001) (released as 4:2:Five)
- Time Machine (2004) (released as 4:2:Five)
- Unstoppable (2004) (released as 4:2:Five)
- Once Upon an Ever After (2012)
- Peppermint Winter (2012)
- Collide & Collide (Deluxe Edition) (2014)
- Moana (2017)
- Warm Up EP (2017)
- Citrus (2019)
- Boy Bands In 5 Minutes (2019)
- Slushy (2020)
- The Mermaid Medley (2020)
- A Chance To Fly (2021)
- Villains (2024)
- K-Pop Demon Hunters Medley (2026)
- Lore (2026)

== Television/Film ==
- NBC's "Today Show"
- NBC's The Sing-Off season 4
- Chicago & Friends in Concert

== Awards ==
Awards
Event	Year	Category	Result	Ref.
Ed McMahon's Next Big Star	2001		Won	
Harmony Sweepstakes a Cappella Festival	2001	Mid-Atlantic Regional Champions	Won	
Harmony Sweepstakes a Cappella Festival	2001	Audience Favorite	Won	
Harmony Sweepstakes a Cappella Festival	2001	Best Original Song	Won	
The Sing-Off	2013	Season 4	Finalist	
Contemporary A Cappella Recording Award - Contemporary A Cappella Society	2013	Best Holiday Album	Runner-up	
Contemporary A Cappella Recording Award - Contemporary A Cappella Society	2013	Best Holiday Song	Nominated	
A Cappella Video Award - Contemporary A Cappella Society	2017	Outstanding Costume / Makeup	Nominated	
A Cappella Video Award - Contemporary A Cappella Society	2017	Best Musical / Soundtrack Video	Won	
A Cappella Music Awards	2019	Pop Group of the Year	Won	
Shorty Awards	2019	Best YouTube Musician	Finalist	
