= Young Voices =

Youth choir concerts

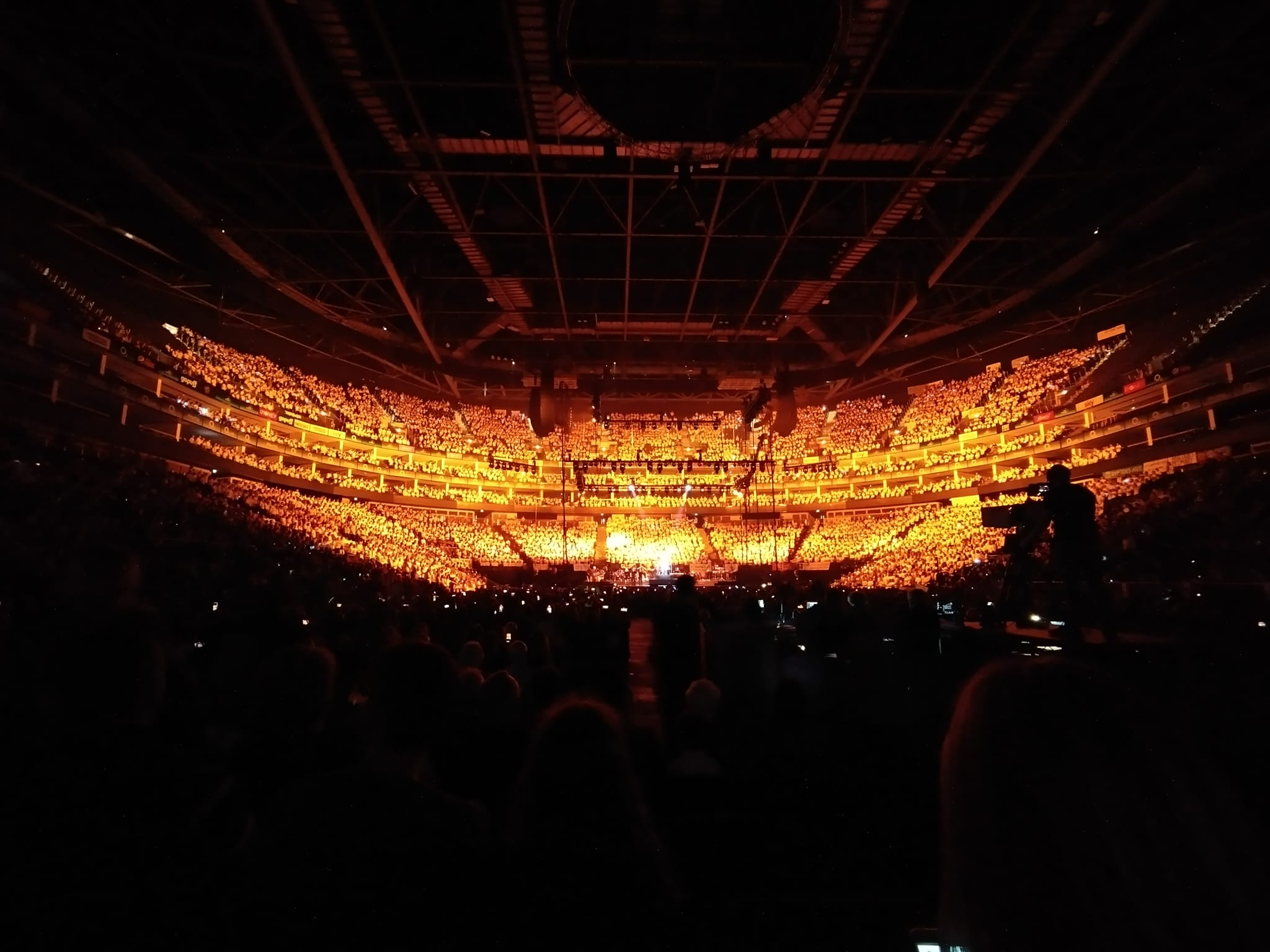
- Founded: 1997
- Headquarters: Cardiff
- Website: https://www.youngvoices.co.uk/

Young Voices organise children's choir concerts around the UK. Starting in 1997, the concerts have grown in number and size of venue, now requiring the largest arenas in the UK. The children rehearse separately in their schools and only come together as a single choir on the day of the performance. Over 2.5 million children have sung in a Young Voices concert. Young Voices holds a number of world records including largest singalong in multiple venues and most backing singers.

== History ==
The initial idea of a thousands strong choir came to David Lewis in 1992, based on his love of Welsh male voice choirs. Working with several local choirs he organised a choir concert at Cardiff Arms Park with 10,000 male voices and some famous performers including Tom Jones, Gwyneth Jones and Dennis O'Neil. After several more male voice concerts David Lewis had the idea to create large concerts specifically for children, and 1997 there were Young Voices concerts in Sheffield, Manchester, Birmingham and Belfast. Venues have been added and dropped over the years and the 2024 programme consists of Sheffield, Birmingham, Manchester and two venues in London.

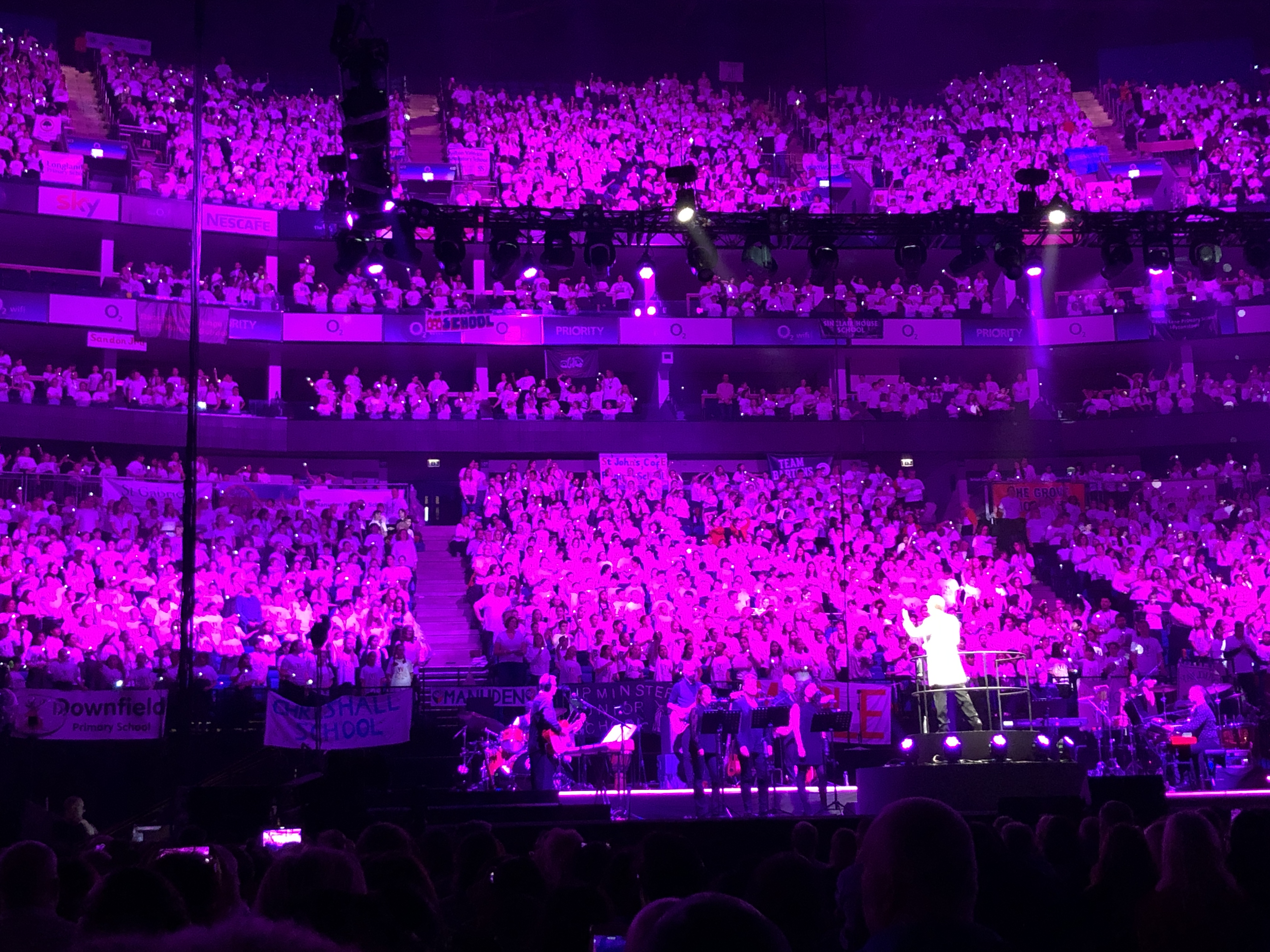
David Lawrence conducting a Young Voices concert.

Much of the team has remained the same since 1997; since their launch, the YV concerts have been conducted by David Lawrence, directed by Craig McLeish, and presented by Gigi Morley. David Lewis has stepped back from running the organisation and has handed over the leadership to his son Ben. David Lewis was awarded the Lifetime Achievement Award at the 2022 Music & Drama Education Awards

== Concerts ==
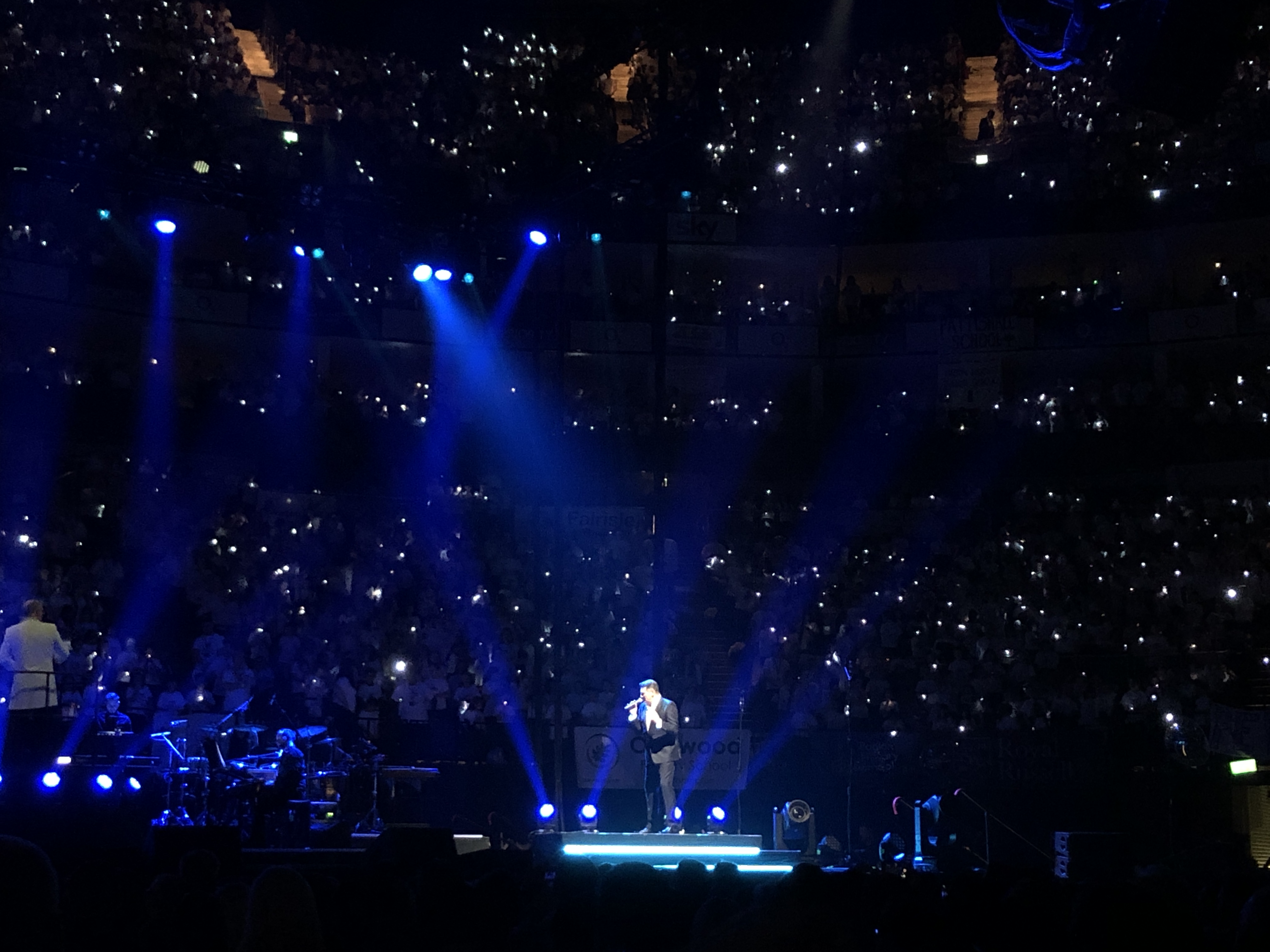
Tony Hadley singing with the Young Voices choir.

The Young Voices concerts take place in on weekdays in January and February, taking advantage of single days when the venues are empty during the quiet time of year for music tours and other events. As the concerts have modest technical requirements they use the arenas backwards, with the choir seated at what is normally the back of the arena and the audience at the normal stage end.

Since 2018 BSL interpreted performances have been added to each of the venues, alongside a commitment to accessible venues.
