= Enjoy Youth =

Studio album by Bright Light Bright Light
- Released: 17 May 2024
- Genre: Dance
- Length: 41:41
- Label: YSKWN!
- Producers: Rod Thomas; Ian Masterson; Jon Shave; Initial Talk; Scott Hoffman; Richard X

Bright Light Bright Light chronology
Fun City (2020)	Enjoy Youth (2024)

Singles from Enjoy Youth
- 1. "I Don't Know What I'm Gonna Do" Released: 18 November 2022; 2. "Sweet Release" Released: 17 March 2023; 3. "Boys, Etc." Released: 3 May 2023; 4. "Down to One" Released: 15 September 2023; 5. "You Want My ..." Released: 26 January 2024; 6. "Every Emotion" Released: 15 March 2024; 7. "Heartslap" Released: 26 April 2024; 8. "Snap!" Released: 27 September 2024; 9. "Revived" Released: 28 March 2025

Enjoy Youth is the fifth studio album by Welsh independent singer-songwriter Bright Light Bright Light, released on 17 May 2024 through YSKWN! records. It features collaborations with Berri, Ultra Naté, Mykal Kilgore, and Beth Hirsch. It marks his first studio album in four years, since Fun City (2020).

== Background ==
Speaking with Tyler Damara Kelly for The Line of Best Fit about the process of the album, Thomas stated:

"Things are pretty shit at the moment and there are times where I really feel like magic has been taken out of the world. I wanted to remind myself that life is pretty special and just focus on the joy we do have."

He also confirmed that the record will have collaborations with artists such as singers-songwriters Mykal Kilgore, Ultra Naté, Berri, and Beth Hirsch. The album's release was scheduled "to release in time for Pride Month" as well as Thomas' appearance at London's Mighty Hoopla festival on 1 June. Thomas revealed that the album's producers and writers include Richard X, Babydaddy of Scissor Sisters, Ian Masterson and Jon Shave, and that gay pornographic actor and social media personality Jonah Wheeler plays the accordion on the album title track.

== Release and promotion ==
Enjoy Youth was released through Thomas independent record label, YSKWN! on 17 May 2024. It was made available on streaming, digital download, and multiple variants on vinyl, CD, and cassette.

=== Singles ===
The album's first single, "I Don't Know What I'm Gonna Do", was released on 18 November 2022.

The second single, "Sweet Release", was released on 17 March 2023, with an accompanying music video released on the same day. The song was both written and produced by Thomas with Jon Shave.

"Boys Etc." was released as the album's third single on 3 May 2023. "Down to One" was released as the album's fourth single on 15 September 2023. with a Halloween themed music video, starring Thomas, Ryan Miller, among others premiered on 13 October.

The fifth single, "You Want My...", was officially released on 26 January 2024, alongside the album official pre-order with the date, title, tracklist, and album cover revealed. The title of the song is a reference to George Michael's "I Want Your Sex". A music video for the song, directed, edited, and animated by Tyler Milliron was released on 19 January.

The sixth single, "Every Emotion", featured Ultra Naté and was released on 15 March 2024. The music video for the song, directed by Naté, was released on 8 April that year.

"Heartslap", featuring Grammy nominee singer-songwriter Mykal Kilgore, was released as the album's seventh single on 26 April 2024. A remix by Dave Audé was released on the same day.

"Snap!" featuring Berri, was released, alongside an extended version, as the album's eighth single on 27 September. On 28 of March, 2025, "Revived" was released as the album's ninth single, alongside a remixes extended play.

== Critical reception ==
Professional ratings
Review scores
Source	Rating
Retropop Magazine	4/5 stars
Classic Pop Magazine	4/5 stars
Metro Weekly	4/5 stars

Connor Gotto from Retropop Magazine praised the record, calling it one of the strongest body of works of Thomas career, as well a reminder that Bright Light Bright Light remains one of "British pop's best kept secrets". Sean Maunier from Metro Weekly called Enjoy Youth a "master class in buoyant, vibrant, glorious dance-pop", highlighting the record "captivating hooks" and "immensely satisfying dance beats", while stating that Thomas album "offers a gentle reminder that youth is a state of mind rather than a product of time".

== Track listing ==
Standard edition
No.	Title	Writer(s)	Producer(s)	Length
1.	"You Want My ..."	Rod Thomas; Ian Masterson	Masterson	3:26
2.	"Snap!" (with Berri)	Thomas; Masterson	Masterson	3:58
3.	"Revived"	Thomas; Jon Shave	Jon Shave	3:15
4.	"Every Emotion" (with Ultra Naté)	Thomas	Rod Thomas	3:32
5.	"Boys Etc."	Thomas	Thomas	3:32
6.	"Heartslap" (with Mykal Kilgore)	Thomas; Shave; Mykal Kilgore	Thomas; Shave	3:09
7.	"Sweet Release"	Thomas; Shave	Thomas; Shave	3:08
8.	"I Don't Know What I'm Gonna Do"	Thomas	Thomas	4:02
9.	"Down to One"	Thomas	Thomas; Initial Talk	3:01
10.	"Sweetest Waste"	Thomas; Scott Hoffman	Thomas; Hoffman	3:04
11.	"Keep"	Thomas; Richard X	Richard X	3:23
12.	"Enjoy Youth" (with Beth Hirsch)	Thomas; Shave	Thomas; Shave	4:11
Total length:				41:41

Lavender deluxe edition
No.	Title	Writer(s)	Producer(s)	Length
13.	"Lose This Feeling"	Thomas	Thomas	3:32
14.	"Cold Sweat, Hot Boys"	Thomas	Thomas	3:33
15.	"Return to Me" (with Megan Vice)	Thomas; Megan Vice	Thomas	3:38
16.	"Boys Etc." (Strut Mix)	Thomas	Thomas	3:23
Total length:				55:00

Amazon exclusive mint green edition
No.	Title	Length
13.	"Put Me in My Place"

Yellow deluxe edition
No.	Title	Length
13.	"So Much Prettier" (2004 studio recording)
14.	"I'll Turn It Down" (2004 studio recording)
15.	"Good Coat" (2004 studio recording)
16.	"A New Word to Say" (2004 studio recording)

== Enjoy Youth (Enjoy More: Deluxe Version) ==
Enjoy Youth (Enjoy More: Deluxe Version)

Compilation album by Bright Light Bright Light
- Released: April 4, 2025
- Genre: Dance
- Languages: English; Welsh; French
- Label: YSKWN!
- Producers: Rod Thomas; Ian Masterson; Jon Shave; Initial Talk; Scott Hoffman; Richard X

Bright Light Bright Light chronology
Make Me Believe in Hope (10th Anniversary Edition) (2022)	Enjoy Youth (Enjoy More: Deluxe Version) (2025)

Singles from Enjoy Youth (Enjoy More: Deluxe Version)
- 1. "Enjoy Youth (Welsh Version)" Released: 7 February 2025; 2. "La Jeunesse" Released: 21 February 2025

Enjoy Youth (Enjoy More: Deluxe Version) is a reissue of Enjoy Youth. It was released independently on April 4, 2025, by YSKWN! records.

To celebrate Enjoy Youth's first anniversary, Thomas announced the release of a reissue of the album subtitled Enjoy More: Deluxe Version. It features the original twelve songs, with eighteen new tracks, containing a total of 30 tracks. The reissue includes new collaborations with Beth Hirsch, Donna Lewis, and Megan Vice, and remixes by Thomas CW, Dave Audé, Berri, Tsatsamis, and Roman Fashion House. The album was promoted by the release of a Welsh version of "Enjoy Youth" with Donna Lewis, and a French version, titled "La Jeunesse" with Beth Hirsch.

Enjoy Youth: (Enjoy More: Deluxe Version) track listing
No.	Title	Length
1.	"You Want My ..."	3:26
2.	"Snap!" (with Berri)	3:58
3.	"Revived"	3:15
4.	"Every Emotion" (with Ultra Naté)	3:32
5.	"Boys Etc."	3:32
6.	"Heartslap" (with Mykal Kilgore)	3:09
7.	"Sweet Release"	3:08
8.	"I Don't Know What I'm Gonna Do"	4:02
9.	"Down To One"	3:01
10.	"Sweetest Waste"	3:04
11.	"Keep"	3:23
12.	"Enjoy Youth" (with Beth Hirsch)	4:11
13.	"Enjoy Youth (Welsh Version)" (with Donna Lewis)	4:05
14.	"Return To Me" (with Megan Vice)	3:38
15.	"Put Me In My Place"	3:34
16.	"Lose This Feeling"	3:32
17.	"Cold Sweat, Hot Boys"	3:33
18.	"Warmer Weather"	3:32
19.	"La Jeunesse" (with Beth Hirsch)	4:06
20.	"So Much Prettier" (2004 Studio Recording)	5:08
21.	"I'll Turn It Down" (2004 Studio Recording)	4:29
22.	"Good Coat" (2004 Studio Recording)	4:18
23.	"A New Word To Say" (2004 Studio Recording)	3:55
24.	"Every Emotion" (Thomas CW Club Mix)	6:16
25.	"Heartslap" (Dave Audé Remix)	3:34
26.	"Snap!" (Very Berri Mix)	3:38
27.	"Boys Etc." (Strut Mix)	3:23
28.	"You Want My ..." (Tsatsamis Remix)	4:37
29.	"Down To One" (Roman Fashion House Mix)	4:35
30.	"You Want My ..." (PG-13 Mix)	2:52

== Personnel ==
Credits (Standard and Lavender Editions):

- Rod Thomas — songwriter (all tracks), producer (track 4–10,12-16)
- Ian Masterson — songwriter, producer (track 1,2)
- Berri — vocals (track 2)
- Jon Shave — songwriter, producer (track 3,6,10,12)
- Sam Harper — backing vocals (track 3)
- Ultra Naté — vocals (track 4)
- Mykal Kilgore — vocals, songwriter (track 6)
- Scott Hoffman — songwriter, producer (track 10)
- Richard X — songwriter, producer (track 11)
- Beth Hirsch — vocals (track 12)
- Jonah Wheeler — accordion (track 12)
- Megan Vice — vocals, songwriter (track 15)

== Charts ==
Chart performance for Enjoy Youth
Chart (2024)	Peak position
Scottish Albums (OCC)	10
UK Albums (OCC)	60
UK Independent Albums (OCC)	3

== Release history ==
Release history and formats for Enjoy Youth
Region	Date	Format(s)	Version	Label(s)	Ref.
Various	17 May 2024	CD; digital download; streaming; vinyl LP	Standard	YSKWN!	
Various	20 May 2024	digital download; streaming	Deluxe	YSKWN!	
Various	4 April 2025	CD; digital download; streaming; vinyl LP	Enjoy More	YSKWN!	
