= Brigitte Calls Me Baby =

American alternative rock band

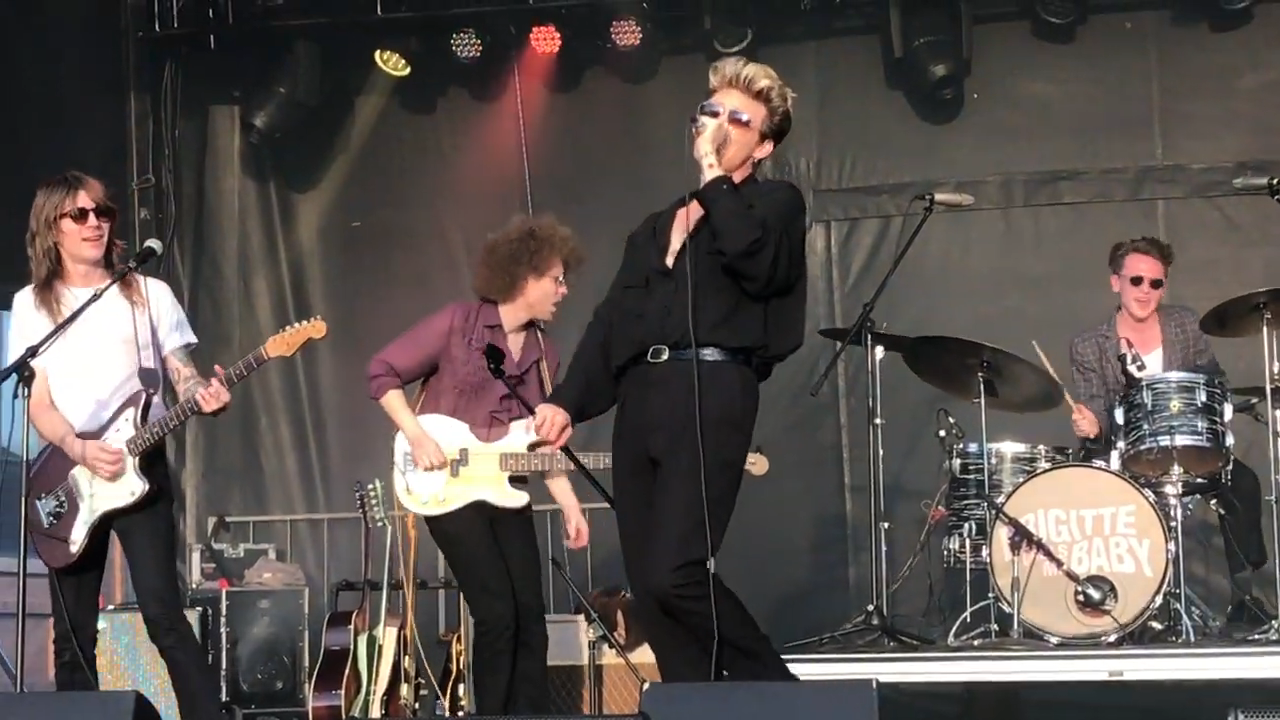
- Brigitte Calls Me Baby performing Palm of Your Hand live in Chicago.

Background information
- Origin: Chicago, Illinois
- Genres: New wave; jangle pop; post-punk; alternative rock
- Years active: 2021–present
- Label: ATO
- Members: Wes Leavins; Jack Fluegel; Devin Wessels; Jeremy Benshish
- Past members: Zach Lentino; Trevor Lynch; David Rosendahl
- Website: brigittecallsmebaby.com

Brigitte Calls Me Baby is an American alternative rock band formed in Chicago, Illinois, in 2021. The band consists of lead singer Wes Leavins, guitarist Jack Fluegel, bassist Devin Wessels, and drummer Jeremy Benshish. The name comes from Leavins' teenaged pen-pal correspondence with French actress Brigitte Bardot.

Prior to the release of any of their music, Brigitte Calls Me Baby had their first gig in 2022, opening for Irish rock band Inhaler, and later opening for English rock band Muse. Following their performance at the Austin South by Southwest music festival in 2023, they caught the attention of ATO records, who signed them and oversaw the release of their EP This House is Made of Corners. In 2024, Brigitte Calls Me Baby released their debut album The Future is Our Way Out.

Brigitte Calls Me Baby's musical style was described by SPIN as "a smattering of upbeat new wave-style synths, jangly post-punk guitar and tight, punchy arrangements".

== History ==
=== Formation and early performances: 2021–2023 ===
Originally from Nederland, Texas, Wes Leavins (born Jacob Rowley) moved to Chicago, Illinois in 2016 to play Elvis Presley in Million Dollar Quartet and connect with potential bandmates he found online. During this time, he also fronted alternative rock band The Juvenescent with some members that eventually joined Brigitte Calls Me Baby. After being noticed by film director Baz Luhrmann for his performance as Elvis, Leavins was asked to work on the biopic Elvis to be the voice of Elvis Presley. When Luhrmann found out Austin Butler could emulate Elvis's voice, Wes continued to help by playing acoustic guitar in pre-production. While working on the set, Leavins met producer Dave Cobb, who he later reconnected with in 2021 to produce a full-length solo album with some of these songs later featured on 2023 debut EP This House Is Made of Corners and their 2024 debut album The Future Is Our Way Out.

With this fully-produced album in hand, he linked up with guitarists Jack Fluegel and Trevor Lynch, bassist Zach Lentino, keyboardist Devin Wessels, and drummer Jeremy Benshish, all Chicago locals, and form the initial lineup of Brigitte Calls Me Baby in 2022.

Early-on performances prior to the band's signing began with gigs in 2022, including opening for Irish rock band Inhaler and English rock band Muse. The band independently released singles "Impressively Average" and "Eddie My Love" in September 2022 and January 2023, respectively. They then released their debut EP This House Is Made of Corners independently in June 2023. Their breakout performance was at the 2023 South by Southwest music festival in Austin, Texas. There, they caught the attention of ATO Records.

=== ATO Records: 2023–present ===
After signing with ATO Records, the band removed "Impressively Average" and This House Is Made of Corners from streaming services to be rereleased in November 2023 under the label. In August 2023, Brigitte Calls Me Baby played their first international show at the All Points East festival in London, England, where they opened for the Strokes. The band had their first nationally televised performance in March 2024, performing on CBS Saturday Morning. Their debut album The Future Is Our Way Out was released in August 2024, which saw the release of more songs Dave Cobb produced in 2021, as well as songs the band produced themselves in 2023. The band went on to support Morrissey on three of his 2025 UK and Europe tour dates, including for Morrissey's homecoming show in Manchester at the Co-op Live Arena.

On January 13, 2026, the band released their first single for the album Irreversible, "Slumber Party". The album is set to release on March 17, 2026. The album's second single, "I Danced With Another Love In My Dream", was released on February 11, 2026. A third single, "I Can Take the Sun Out of the Sky", was issued on March 7, 2026.

The band will be supported by the British indie rock band The Vaccines on the British dates of their 2026 tour.

== Musical style and influences ==
Brigitte Calls Me Baby's music has been described as new wave, jangle pop, post-punk and alternative rock. Their music had been compared by NME to bands such as the Smiths and the Strokes. Leavins' vocals have been likened to artists Elvis Presley, Roy Orbison, and Morrissey (whom the band opened for in 2025) for his crooner style of singing. Primary inspirations cited by Leavins include Orbison, Presley and Frank Sinatra, with other stylistic influences including Radiohead, the Strokes, Arctic Monkeys, LCD Soundsystem, Echo & the Bunnymen, Dead or Alive and OMD.

== Discography ==
=== Albums ===
Title	Album details	Peak chart positions		
Title	Album details	FRA Phys	FRA Rock	UK Ind.
The Future Is Our Way Out	Released: August 2, 2024; Label: ATO	127	—	3
Irreversible	Release: March 13, 2026; Label: ATO	70	18	24

=== Extended plays ===
Title	Album details
This House Is Made of Corners	Released: November 3, 2023; Label: ATO

=== Singles ===
Title	Year	Peak chart positions			Album
Title	Year	US AAA	US Air	US Alt	Album
"Impressively Average"	2022	9	33	33	The Future Is Our Way Out
"Eddie My Love"	2023	24	—	—	The Future Is Our Way Out
"You Are Only Made of Dreams"	2023	—	—	—	The Future Is Our Way Out
"We Were Never Alive"	2024	21	—	—	The Future Is Our Way Out
"Pink Palace"	2024	—	—	—	The Future Is Our Way Out
"Too Easy"	2024	26	—	—	The Future Is Our Way Out
"Careless Whisper" (George Michael cover)	2025	—	—	—	Non-album single
"Slumber Party"	2026	9	30	26	Irreversible
"I Danced with Another Love in My Dream"	2026	—	—	—	Irreversible
"I Can Take the Sun Out of the Sky"	2026	15	49	34	Irreversible
"Geordie"	2026	—	—	—	Non-album singles
"Altitude"	2026	—	—	—	Non-album singles
