= Tsatsamis =

British singer-songwriter and record producer

- Born: Peter Tsatsamis-Cooper
- Genres: Electropop; dance-pop
- Occupations: singer-songwriter; producer; musician; disc jockey
- Years active: 2022–present
- Label: Independent
- Website: tsatsamis.com

Peter Tsatsamis-Cooper, known mononymously as Tsatsamis, is a British singer-songwriter and record producer, based in London. He's known for his distinctive blend of confessional and vulnerable lyricism exploring queer culture and sexual identity with electro-pop, dance-pop and synth-pop sounds.

== Early life ==
Raised in Buckinghamshire by Greek immigrant parents, Tsatsamis began studying music at an early age, taking piano and drum lessons during childhood. He later developed an interest in songwriting while completing a GCSE music composition project, an experience he has described as formative in building his confidence as both a vocalist and writer. After graduating from the University of Sheffield, he pursued music professionally after several years of balancing creative work alongside employment.

== Career ==
=== 2022–2023: Debut, Versions and Their Versions EPs ===
Tsatsamis emerged in the British independent music scene in 2022 with the release of his debut extended play Versions. The project combined autobiographical songwriting centred on queer identity, intimacy, and self-acceptance with atmospheric electronic production. Critics described the EP as a "love letter to queer culture" and received support from BBC Introducing, with his singles "Good Time", and "Single Tear" being selected as "Ones To Watch". His collaboration with Scottish producer TAAHLIAH, "Fall Into Place" was named "Track of the Week" by BBC Introducing.

Following the release of Versions, Tsatsamis performed at Birmingham Pride, appeared at BBC Introducing live events, and supported electronic artists including Paige Bea and the Slovak singer Adéla during her first performances in the UK. He later released a remixed version of his first EP titled Their Versions in 2023.

=== 2024–2025: Our Shame ===
On 5 April 2024, Tsatsamis released his second extended play titled Our Shame, which included the singles "Let Go", "Faith", "Misuderstanding" and "Everybody Wants to Be You"; the latter was number 10 on the i-D list of 100 Best Songs of 2023.

In 2024, Tsatsamis was selected by the Youth Music Fund for its annual "NextGen: Ones To Watch" list for 2025. On 24 July 2025, he released the song "Sweet Praise". His next single, "Secret Boyfriend", was released on November 22 of the same year.

=== 2026–present: Tyscophant ===
On 14 February 2026, Tsatsamis released the song "Recreational" as the lead single from his debut mixtape Tyscophant. On 14 March Tsatsamis released a second single titled "Spit or Kiss", followed by a third single "Angelina" on 4 April. On 24 April his debut mixtape Tyscophant was released on April 24 to critical acclaim.

== Artistry ==
=== Influences ===
Musically, Tsatsamis has cited electronic and alternative artists including Caribou, Jamie xx and James Blake as influences on his production style, while identifying George Michael, SOPHIE, Pet Shop Boys and Bronski Beat as important references in his approach to queer storytelling within pop music. He has also referenced the cultural impact of It's a Sin and Lady Gaga's Born This Way album as significant influences on his artistic and personal development.

=== Musical style ===
Tsatsamis has described his own music as “euphoric, introspective melancholia” and "songs that have an atmosphere of fatal lust". His music has drawn comparisons to artists such as George Michael, Bronski Beat, Pet Shop Boys, and Years & Years, while incorporating contemporary electronic influences including James Blake, Jamie xx, and Kaytranada. His sound has been characterised by ethereal falsetto vocals, melancholic dance production, and introspective lyricism.

=== Voice ===
Journalists have compared his vocal style to Jimmy Somerville and Olly Alexander, while noting similarities to the confessional electropop of Frankmusik’s Complete Me era.

== Personal life ==
Tsatsamis is openly gay. He has stated his work aims to create emotional connection and healing through pop music, particularly for queer listeners navigating identity, loneliness, and self-expression.

== Concerts ==
Headlining

- The Our Shame Tour (2024)

Opening

- Adéla – The ProvocaTour (2025)
- Jessie Ware - Super bloom Tour European Non Stadium Dates (2026)

== Discography ==
=== Mixtapes ===
Title	Details	Ref.
Tsycophant	Released: April 24, 2026; Label: Listen Generously; Format: Digital download, streaming	

=== Extended plays ===
Title	Details	Ref.
Versions	Released: January 21, 2022; Label: Independent; Format: Digital download, streaming	
Our Shame	Released: April 5, 2024; Label: 112 Angels; Format: Digital download, streaming	

Remixes

Title	Details	Ref.
Their Versions	Released: January 21, 2023; Label: Independent; Format: Digital download, streaming	

=== Singles ===
Title	Year	Album	Ref.
"Good Time"	2022	Versions	
"Fall Into Place" (with TAAHLIAH)	2022	Non-album single	
"Single Tear"	2022	Versions	
"Everybody Wants a Piece of You"	2023	Our Shame	
"Let Go"	2023	Our Shame	
"Faith"	2024	Our Shame	
"Misunderstanding"	2025	Our Shame	
"Sweet Praise"	2025	Non-album singles	
"Secret Boyfriend"	2025	Non-album singles	
"Recreational"	2026	Tsycophant	
"Spit or Kiss"	2026	Tsycophant	
"Angelina"	2026	Tsycophant	
"Masochist"	2026	TBA	

=== Other appearances ===
Title	Year	Artist	Album	Ref.
"On and On" (with Tsatsamis)	2022	Comanavago	Heart Failure (Deluxe Edition)	
"Glitchin' in This Club" (with Tsatsamis)	2023	Spent	City Music for Country Kids	
"Was I Ever Alone?" (Tsatsamis' Hymn)	2024	Twst	TWST0002 (Upgraded)	
"You Want My..." (Tsatsamis Remix)	2025	Bright Light Bright Light	Enjoy Youth (Enjoy More: Deluxe Version)	
"Nobody's Love" (Tsatsamis Remix)	2025	Tom Rasmussen	High Wire (Remixed and Reimagined)	
