= Charity Gayle =

American Christian singer and worship leader

- Origin: Buffalo, New York, U.S.
- Genres: Contemporary Christian music; Gospel
- Occupations: Singer; songwriter; worship leader
- Years active: 2010s–present
- Website: www.charitygayle.com

Charity Gayle is an American Christian singer, songwriter, and worship leader. She is known for songs including "I Speak Jesus", "Thank You Jesus for the Blood", and "New Name Written Down in Glory".

== Early life ==
Gayle was raised in Buffalo, New York, in a family involved in Christian ministry. She became involved in music and worship as a child and began directing choirs at the age of 16. Gayle spent 2014 and 2015 in Nashville, Tennessee, where she developed her songwriting and focused on writing songs for congregational worship.

== Personal life ==
Charity married fellow worship leader and songwriter Ryan Kennedy on November 23, 2018. The couple has two sons. Their first son, Remington, was born in 2022. She lives and leads worship with her husband, Ryan Kennedy. The couple are part GatherHouse, a ministry focused on prayer and worship.

== Ministry ==
Gayle has served as a worship leader and music ministry director and has been involved with People & Songs and its Emerging Sound project. She has also contributed as a songwriter and vocalist to recordings associated with the collective.

== Music career ==
Gayle began her recording career in the mid-2010s. In 2012, she was named GMA Immerse Vocalist of the Year. She released the single "Divine Exchange" in 2014, followed by the Divine Exchange EP in 2015.

Her debut full-length album, Lord You Are My Song, was released in 2018. It was followed by Endless Praise in 2021 and her third album, Rejoice, was released on April 5, 2024. The 14-track live worship album was produced by Kyle Lee and co-produced by Dwan Hill.

== Discography ==
=== Albums ===
==== Studio albums ====
List of studio albums
Title	Details
Lord You Are My Song	2018

==== Live albums ====
List of live albums
Title	Details
Endless Praise	2021
Rejoice	2024

==== Extended plays ====
List of extended plays
Title	Details
Divine Exchange	2015

=== Singles ===
==== As lead artist ====
Year	Title	Album
2014	"Divine Exchange"	Divine Exchange
2021	"Thank You Jesus for the Blood"	Endless Praise
2021	"I Speak Jesus"	Endless Praise
2021	"New Name Written Down in Glory"	Endless Praise
2024	"Because of Jesus"	Rejoice

== Awards and nominations ==
=== GMA Dove Awards ===
Year	Award	Work	Result
2022	Gospel Worship Recorded Song of the Year	"Thank You Jesus for the Blood"	Won
