= Bright Light Bright Light =

Welsh singer-songwriter (born 1982)

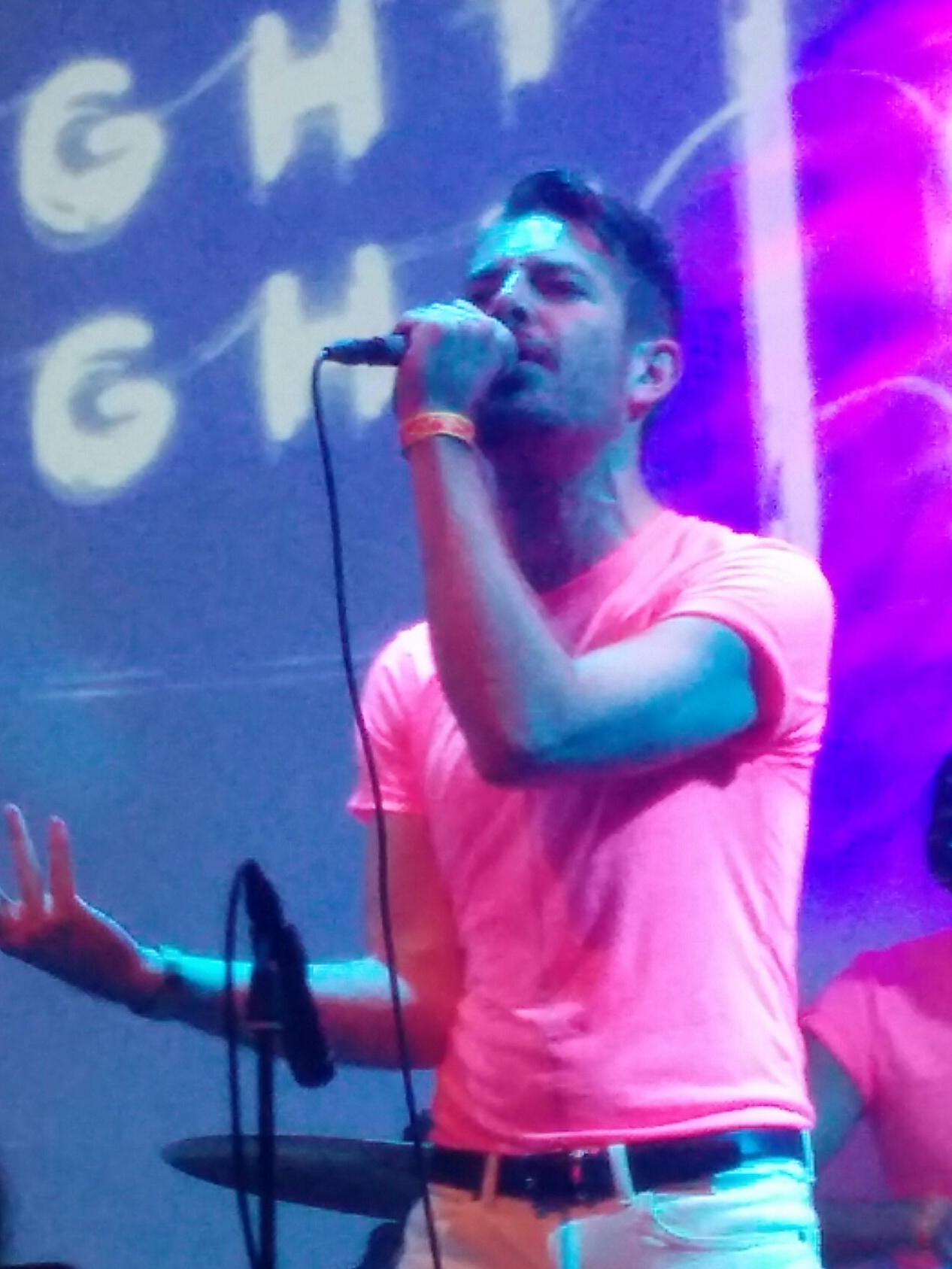
- Bright Light Bright Light performing in September 2016

Background information
- Born: Rod Thomas; 30 October 1982 (age 43); Neath, West Glamorgan, Wales
- Genres: Electropop; dance; disco; house; alternative
- Occupations: Singer; DJ; composer; producer
- Instruments: Vocals; piano; guitar; saxophone; bass guitar; ukulele
- Years active: 2006–present
- Labels: Self Raising; YSKWN!

Rod Thomas (born 30 October 1982), known professionally as Bright Light Bright Light, is a Welsh electro-pop singer, DJ, composer and producer based in New York City. Bright Light Bright Light incorporates many elements of nu-disco into his music, also branching into synthpop, dance and house music. Four of his albums have reached the top 20 on the UK Independent Albums Chart.

== Career ==
=== 1982–2009: Early years ===
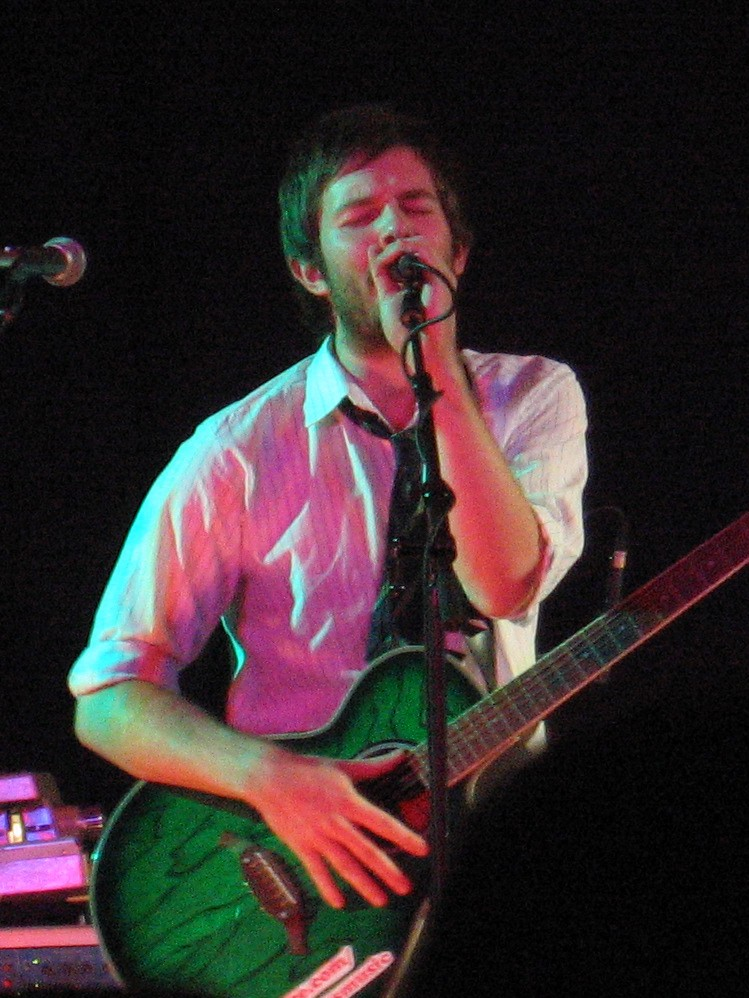
Performing as Rod Thomas in 2006

Thomas grew up in a small village near Neath, Wales, and learned several instruments as a child, including piano. His first forays into music were more folk-based, led by acoustic guitar with, due to a lack of equipment, minimal beats around it. Thomas later stated his dalliance with folk was due to his lack of knowledge with production techniques, and that he was always drawn to house and synthpop. He left Wales to take a place reading English literature and creative writing at Warwick University, then made the move to London. In London he set up a studio at home, and spent rush hours busking busy London tube stations. In 2009, he sent demo tracks to American producer Boom Bip, resulting in Thomas being invited to Los Angeles for two weeks to collaborate on tracks. Thomas stated Boom Bip's production on the song "A New Word to Say" helped him find "my sound".

=== 2010–19: Bright Light Bright Light ===
Thomas released "Love Part II", his first single under the name Bright Light Bright Light, in 2010 on the Popjustice Hi-Fi label. Thomas chose the name Bright Light Bright Light from a quote spoken by the character Gizmo in the 1984 movie Gremlins. 2010 also saw him tour as the support act for Ellie Goulding. The singles "Disco Moment" and "Feel It" followed in 2011 and 2012, and, after appearances at Bestival in the UK and South by South West in the US, he released his debut album Make Me Believe in Hope in 2012.

The album tracks on Make Me Believe in Hope were co-written and produced by Thomas, The Invisible Men and Andy Chatterley. The album features several collaborations, including vocals from Scissor Sisters' guitarist Del Marquis on the track "Cry at Films". Make Me Believe in Hope was released in the UK on 4 June 2012 through independent label Aztec Records, and the album received generally positive reviews, with The Fly magazine noting the album among releases that just missed its annual top 50. The album was voted at number 4 in The Guardian's Reader Choice: Best Albums of 2012. The single "Disco Moment", from the album, was placed on the BBC Radio 1 play list. In June 2012, the album made the final shortlist for the annual Welsh Music Prize, but lost to Future of the Left. 2012 also saw Bright Light Bright Light support Scissor Sisters on four venues of their UK tour.

In 2013, the EP In Your Care was released; followed by "I Wish We Were Leaving", a second single from Thomas' second album, featuring Elton John. Following the latter's release, Thomas toured with Elton John during summer 2014. Bright Light Bright Light's second album Life is Easy was released in the UK on 7 July 2014. It charted at No. 139, and was preceded by the single "I Believe" on 29 June. Thomas spent most of 2014 and 2015 touring as the opening act for Elton John, while he ended 2015 with a short US tour opening for John Grant.

In 2016, Choreography was released, entering the UK Album Chart at No. 72, the Independent Album Breakers chart at No. 1, and the US Billboard Dance / Electronic Album Chart at No. 12. The album features guest appearances by Elton John, Alan Cumming, all Scissor Sisters members and Mykal Kilgore. All guests feature on the album's lead single "All in the Name", which was unveiled in a live performance on Graham Norton's BBC TV show with Elton John on stage with him. The song was added to the Radio 2 B-list playlist and scored Thomas his widest-reaching single to date.

Aside from creating his own music, Thomas runs a daytime dance party in New York (which transfers to London when he is touring) called Romy & Michele's Saturday Afternoon Tea Dance, named after Romy & Michele's High School Reunion, one of his favourite films. The party takes place both in Brooklyn and at Club Cumming, a bar in Manhattan's East Village run by Alan Cumming, who stars in the film that inspired the event.

In 2017, Thomas appeared as an extra in one of his favourite TV series, The League of Gentlemen, in the first episode of their three-part TV return, "Return to Royston Vasey", as a job-seeker in Pauline's restart class. This marked his second time working with actor, director and writer Mark Gatiss, after composing the theme tune for Mark's BBC4 series Queers, created as part of the BBC's cycle "Gay Britannia", to mark the 50th anniversary of the passing of the Sexual Offences Act 1967. The show features interviews with gay characters at the margins of the community. It was broadcast by BBC America in collaboration with AMC Networks.

In 2019, he was picked as the opening act for Cher's European tour, playing nine shows across Germany, Netherlands, Belgium, Denmark and Sweden.

=== 2020–present: New music ===
Thomas provided the vocals for the animated intro to the video game Murder by Numbers, which was released on 5 March 2020. Later that month, he released "This Was My House", featuring Madonna's backing singers Niki Haris and Donna De Lory and produced by Initial Talk, as the first song from his fourth album Fun City. The song was described as "a perfect disco song" by Paper Magazine, written about how the LGBTQ+ community's safe spaces have been under attack in recent times, and how, despite the upsurge in anti-LGBTQ+ and xenophobic rhetoric, everybody deserves to feel safe in the place they call home.

Fun City was a number 1 UK Dance Album hit on its release in September 2020 receiving widespread critical acclaim, featuring a slew of LGBTQ+ talent adding their vocals: Brendan Maclean, Jake Shears, Andy Bell of Erasure, Sam Sparro, Caveboy, Niki & Donna, KAYE, The Illustrious Blacks, Big Dipper, Mark Gatiss adding a spoken word piece, and Justin Vivian Bond.

In November 2020, Bright Light Bright Light released a duet with alt-cabaret star Justin Vivian Bond, "Saying Goodbye Is Exhausting". The haunting ballad captures grief in the LGBTQ+ community. It was "released to raise some hope, money and awareness for Trans Awareness Week and World AIDS Day 2020, the official day of release of the EP."

Bright Light Bright Light's fifth studio album Enjoy Youth was released on 17 May 2024. It was preceded by several singles including: "I Don't Know What I'm Gonna Do", "Sweetest Release", "Boys Etc.", "Down To One", "You Want My ...", "Every Emotion" with Ultra Naté and "Heartslap" with Mykal Kilgore.

== Personal life ==
Thomas has described himself both as "gay" and as "queer".

== Awards ==
Thomas won Album Of The Year at the 2016 WINQ Magazine Awards for his album 'Choreography'.

Thomas was awarded the Bideawee Hero Award for his work fundraising for, and volunteering at Bideawee, a no kill cat and dog rescue organization in New York in 2025.

== Discography ==
=== Studio albums ===
as Rod Thomas

- Until Something Fits (2009)
- Quiet City (2021) - instrumental album
- Until Something Fits (2021) - instrumental album

as Bright Light Bright Light

- Make Me Believe in Hope (2012)
- Life Is Easy (2014)
- Choreography (2016)
- Fun City (2020)
- Enjoy Youth (2024)

== Filmography ==
Year	Title	Credit	Notes
Television
2016	Weekend	Himself	Self - Guest (Season 3; Episode 25)
2016	The Graham Norton Show	Himself	Self - Musical Guest (Season 19; Episode 9)
2017	Queers	Composer	Theme Song
2017	The League of Gentlemen	Job-seeker	Episode: "Return to Royston Vasey"; Extra
2023	And Just Like That	Bartender	Episode: S2 E11 "The Last Supper Part 2"
Films
2020	Death Drop Gorgeous	Composer	Original Soundtrack
2022	All Man: The International Male Story	Composer	Original Soundtrack
