= Better Late Than Never Tour =

2022 comedy tour by Peter Kay

- Tour by Peter Kay
- Location: United Kingdom; Ireland
- Start date: 2 December 2022
- End date: 8 August 2026
- No. of shows: 205

The Better Late Than Never Tour was a comedy tour by English stand-up comedian Peter Kay. The tour was announced on 6 November 2022 during the ad break of the series 22 premiere of I'm A Celebrity Get Me Out of Here. This was the first work project by Kay since the cancellation of his 2018 tour Peter Kay Live: Have Gags, Will Travel which was cancelled due to family reasons.

Tickets for the tour started at £35, matching the price bands of his previous tour The Tour That Doesn't Tour Tour...Now On Tour which holds the Guinness World Record for the biggest selling comedy tour of all time, playing to more than 1.2 million people.

Announced on 6 November 2022, the tour was to start on 2 December 2022 in Manchester before visiting Birmingham, Liverpool, Belfast, Newcastle, Glasgow and Dublin due to conclude on 11 August 2022. On 9 November, Kay announced a monthly London residency on BBC Radio 2 due to take place at The O2 Arena running for 11 months.

On 12 November 2022, tickets for the tour went on sale with thousands of fans attempting to book tickets. Additional dates were added for over 2 years in advance up until June 2025.

In February 2024, it was announced that Peter Kay would become the first artist to perform at Co-op Live, with shows scheduled for 23 and 24 April 2024. However, due to construction delays at the venue, the opening shows were first postponed by a week and later delayed again until May 2024.

An extension of the tour was announced during the series 24 premiere of I'm A Celebrity Get Me Out of Here 17 November 2024, adding further dates in previously announced cities along with new locations including Leeds, Sheffield, Aberdeen, Nottingham, Brighton, Bournemouth, Cardiff and Douglas.

Kay confirmed a final 2026 extension of the tour on BBC The One Show on 26 November 2025 with all profits going to 12 cancer charities.

== Tour dates ==
Date	City	Country	Venue
2 December 2022	Manchester	England	AO Arena
3 December 2022	Manchester	England	AO Arena
16 December 2022	London	England	O2 Arena
17 December 2022	Birmingham	England	Utilita Arena
6 January 2023	Liverpool	England	M&S Bank Arena
7 January 2023	Liverpool	England	M&S Bank Arena
20 January 2023	Leeds	England	First Direct Arena
21 January 2023	London	England	O2 Arena
17 February 2023	Sheffield	England	Utilita Arena
18 February 2023	London	England	O2 Arena
23 February 2023	Belfast	Northern Ireland	SSE Arena
24 February 202	Belfast	Northern Ireland	SSE Arena
25 February 2023	Belfast	Northern Ireland	SSE Arena
9 March 2023	Newcastle	England	Utilita Arena
10 March 2023	Newcastle	England	Utilita Arena
22 March 2023	London	England	O2 Arena
23 March 2023	Birmingham	England	Resorts World Arena
6 April 2023	Dublin	Ireland	3 Arena
7 April 2023	Dublin	Ireland	3 Arena
21 April 2023	Birmingham	England	Utilita Arena
22 April 2023	London	England	O2 Arena
5 May 2023	Glasgow	Scotland	OVO Hydro
6 May 2023	Glasgow	Scotland	OVO Hydro
19 May 2023	Leeds	England	First Direct Arena
20 May 2023	London	England	O2 Arena
2 June 2023	Birmingham	England	Utilita Arena
3 June 2023	London	England	O2 Arena
16 June 2023	Cardiff	Wales	International Arena
17 June 2023	Cardiff	Wales	International Arena
14 July 2023	Nottingham	England	Motorpoint Arena
15 July 2023	Nottingham	England	Motorpoint Arena
28 July 2023	Birmingham	England	Utilita Arena
29 July 2023	London	England	O2 Arena
11 August 2023	Sheffield	England	Utilita Arena
12 August 2023	Sheffield	England	Utilita Arena
29 August 2023	Birmingham	England	Utilita Arena
30 August 2023	London	England	O2 Arena
8 September 2023	Leeds	England	First Direct Arena
9 September 2023	London	England	O2 Arena
22 September 2023	Manchester	England	AO Arena
23 September 2023	Manchester	England	AO Arena
7 October 2023	London	England	O2 Arena
19 October 2023	Manchester	England	AO Arena
20 October 2023	Manchester	England	AO Arena
5 November 2023	Manchester	England	AO Arena
6 November 2023	Manchester	England	AO Arena
18 November 2023	London	England	O2 Arena
1 December 2023	Manchester	England	AO Arena
16 December 2023	London	England	O2 Arena
5 January 2024	Birmingham	England	Utilita Arena
6 January 2024	London	England	O2 Arena
26 January 2024	AO Arena	England	AO Arena
27 January 2024	AO Arena	England	AO Arena
9 February 2024	AO Arena	England	AO Arena
10 February 2024	AO Arena	England	AO Arena
23 February 2024	Sheffield	England	Utilita Arena
24 February 2024	London	England	O2 Arena
8 March 2024	Manchester	England	AO Arena
9 March 2024	Manchester	England	AO Arena
22 March 2024	Leeds	England	First Direct Arena
23 March 2024	London	England	O2 Arena
5 April 2024	Manchester	England	AO Arena
6 April 2024	Manchester	England	AO Arena
19 April 2024	Birmingham	England	Utilita Arena
20 April 2024	London	England	O2 Arena
3 May 2024	Birmingham	England	Utilita Arena
4 May 2024	London	England	O2 Arena
17 May 2024	Manchester	England	AO Arena
18 May 2024	Manchester	England	AO Arena
23 May 2024	Manchester	England	Co-op Live
24 May 2024	Manchester	England	Co-op Live
1 June 2024	Leeds	England	First Direct Arena
2 June 2024	London	England	O2 Arena
14 June 2024	Manchester	England	AO Arena
15 June 2024	Manchester	England	AO Arena
12 July 2024	Sheffield	England	Utilita Arena
13 July 2024	London	England	O2 Arena
26 July 2024	Manchester	England	AO Arena
27 July 2024	Manchester	England	AO Arena
9 August 2024	Birmingham	England	Utilita Arena
10 August 2024	London	England	O2 Arena
23 August 2024	Manchester	England	AO Arena
24 August 2024	Manchester	England	AO Arena
6 September 2024	Sheffield	England	Utilita Arena
7 September 2024	London	England	O2 Arena
20 September 2024	Manchester	England	AO Arena
21 September 2024	Manchester	England	AO Arena
7 October 2024	Birmingham	England	Utilita Arena
8 October 2024	London	England	O2 Arena
18 October 2024	Manchester	England	AO Arena
19 October 2024	Manchester	England	AO Arena
1 November 2024	Manchester	England	AO Arena
2 November 2024	Manchester	England	AO Arena
15 November 2024	Birmingham	England	Utilita Arena
16 November 2024	London	England	O2 Arena
29 November 2024	Manchester	England	AO Arena
30 November 2024	Manchester	England	AO Arena
5 December 2024	London	England	O2 Arena
6 December 2024	Birmingham	England	Utilita Arena
20 December 2024	Manchester	England	AO Arena
21 December 2024	Manchester	England	AO Arena
10 January 2025	Manchester	England	AO Arena
11 January 2025	Manchester	England	AO Arena
24 January 2025	Birmingham	England	Utilita Arena
25 January 2025	London	England	O2 Arena
7 February 2025	Manchester	England	AO Arena
8 February 2025	Manchester	England	AO Arena
21 February 2025	Birmingham	England	Resorts World Arena
22 February 2025	London	England	O2 Arena
8 March 2025	Leeds	England	First Direct Arena
5 April 2025	Manchester	England	AO Arena
3 May 2025	Sheffield	England	Utilita Arena
16 May 2025	London	England	O2 Arena
17 May 2025	Manchester	England	AO Arena
30 May 2025	Aberdeen	Scotland	P&J Live
31 May 2025	Aberdeen	Scotland	P&J Live
6 June 2025	Birmingham	England	Utilita Arena
7 June 2025	Birmingham	England	Utilita Arena
20 June 2025	London	England	O2 Arena
21 June 2025	Manchester	England	AO Arena
10 July 2025	Dublin	Ireland	3 Arena
25 July 2025	Manchester	England	AO Arena
26 July 2025	London	England	O2 Arena
7 August 2025	Belfast	Northern Ireland	SSE Arena
23 August 2025	Newcastle	England	Utilita Arena
19 September 2025	Manchester	England	AO Arena
23 October 2025	Glasgow	Scotland	OVO Hydro
21 November 2025	Liverpool	England	M&S Bank Arena
11 December 2025	Nottingham	England	Motorpoint Arena
12 December 2025	Nottingham	England	Motorpoint Arena
19 December 2025	Nottingham	England	Motorpoint Arena
20 December 2025	Nottingham	England	Motorpoint Arena
9 January 2026	Brighton	England	Brighton Centre
10 January 2026	Bournemouth	England	International Centre
23 January 2026	Cardiff	England	Utilita Arena
24 January 2026	Cardiff	England	Utilita Arena
20 February 2026	Douglas	Isle of Man	Villa Marina
21 February 2026	Douglas	Isle of Man	Villa Marina
7 March 2026	Aberdeen	Scotland	P&J Live
8 March 2026	Newcastle	England	Utilita Arena
20 March 2026	Nottingham	England	Motorpoint Arena
21 March 2026	Nottingham	England	Motorpoint Arena
3 April 2026	Glasgow	Scotland	OVO Hydro
4 April 2026	Glasgow	Scotland	OVO Hydro
16 April 2026	Dublin	Ireland	3 Arena
17 April 2026	Dublin	Ireland	3 Arena
18 April 2026	Dublin	Ireland	3 Arena
1 May 2026	Birmingham	England	Utilita Arena
2 May 2026	Birmingham	England	Utilita Arena
15 May 2026	Newcastle	England	Utilita Arena
16 May 2026	Leeds	England	First Direct Arena
4 June 2026	Belfast	Northern Ireland	SSE Arena
5 June 2026	Belfast	Northern Ireland	SSE Arena
6 June 2026	Belfast	Northern Ireland	SSE Arena
19 June 2026	Liverpool	England	M&S Bank Arena
20 June 2026	Sheffield	England	Utilita Arena
24 July 2026	Leeds	England	First Direct Arena
7 August 2026	London	England	O2 Arena
8 August 2026	Manchester	England	AO Arena
