= Mykal Kilgore =

American R&B artist

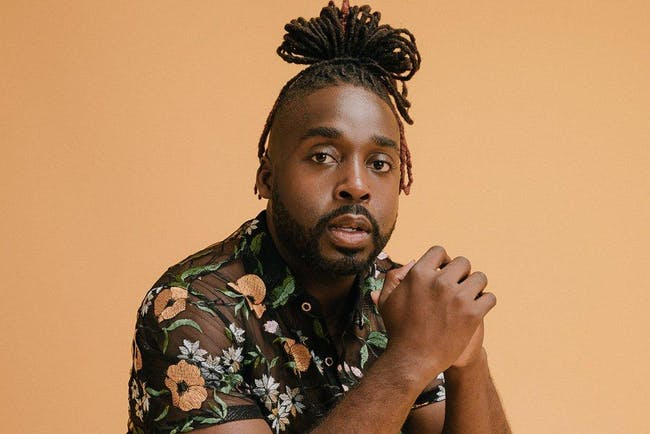
- Kilgore in 2019
- Born: Orlando, Florida, U.S.
- Occupations: Singer, Songwriter
- Website: mykalkilgore.com

Mykal Kilgore is an American singer and songwriter. His debut album, A Man Born Black, was released on September 6, 2019.

== Personal life ==
Mykal Kilgore was born and raised in Orlando, Florida. He attended Florida State University.

While in high school in Orlando, Kilgore sang in a barbershop quartet known as 4 The Love, which eventually became the modern a cappella group VoicePlay. Kilgore has returned to sing with the group in the music videos "Stand By Me" and "Be Prepared".

Kilgore is queer.

== Career ==
Kilgore's theater credits include Motown: The Musical, The Wiz Live!, and Hair. He made his Broadway Principal debut in Chicago as Mary Sunshine in February of 2026

Kilgore released his debut album A Man Born Black in 2019. The album debuted at #2 on the iTunes R&B charts and on five different Billboard charts. In 2020, Kilgore received an NAACP Image Award nomination for Outstanding New Artist, as well as a SoulTracks Readers' Choice Awards nomination for New Artist of the Year. The lead single from A Man Born Black, "Let Me Go", was nominated for Best Traditional R&B Performance for the 63rd Annual Grammy Awards in 2021. Kilgore was the first openly gay artist to be nominated in the category. In October 2024, he appeared on Eisa Davis and Lin-Manuel Miranda's musical concept album Warriors. He sang the role of Elan.

== Discography ==
=== Studio albums ===
- A Man Born Black (2019)

== Acting credits ==
=== Theater ===
Year	Title	Role
2009	Hair	Tribe
2012	The Book of Mormon	Ensemble
2013	Motown: The Musical	Ensemble, u/s Marvin G.
2015	The Wiz Live!	Ensemble
2016	Dear Evan Hansen	Virtual Voice
2017	Jesus Christ Superstar	Judas & Annas
2018	Jesus Christ Superstar Live in Concert	Ensemble
2018	Songs for a New World	Man 1
2019	Into the Woods	The Witch
2020	Joseph and the Amazing Technicolor Dreamcoat	Judah
2022	The Life	Young Jojo
2025	The Wiz	Cowardly Lion
2025	Guys and Dolls	Nicely-Nicely Johnson
2026	Chicago	Mary Sunshine
2026	Jesus Christ Superstar	Judas
