= Nina Nesbitt discography =

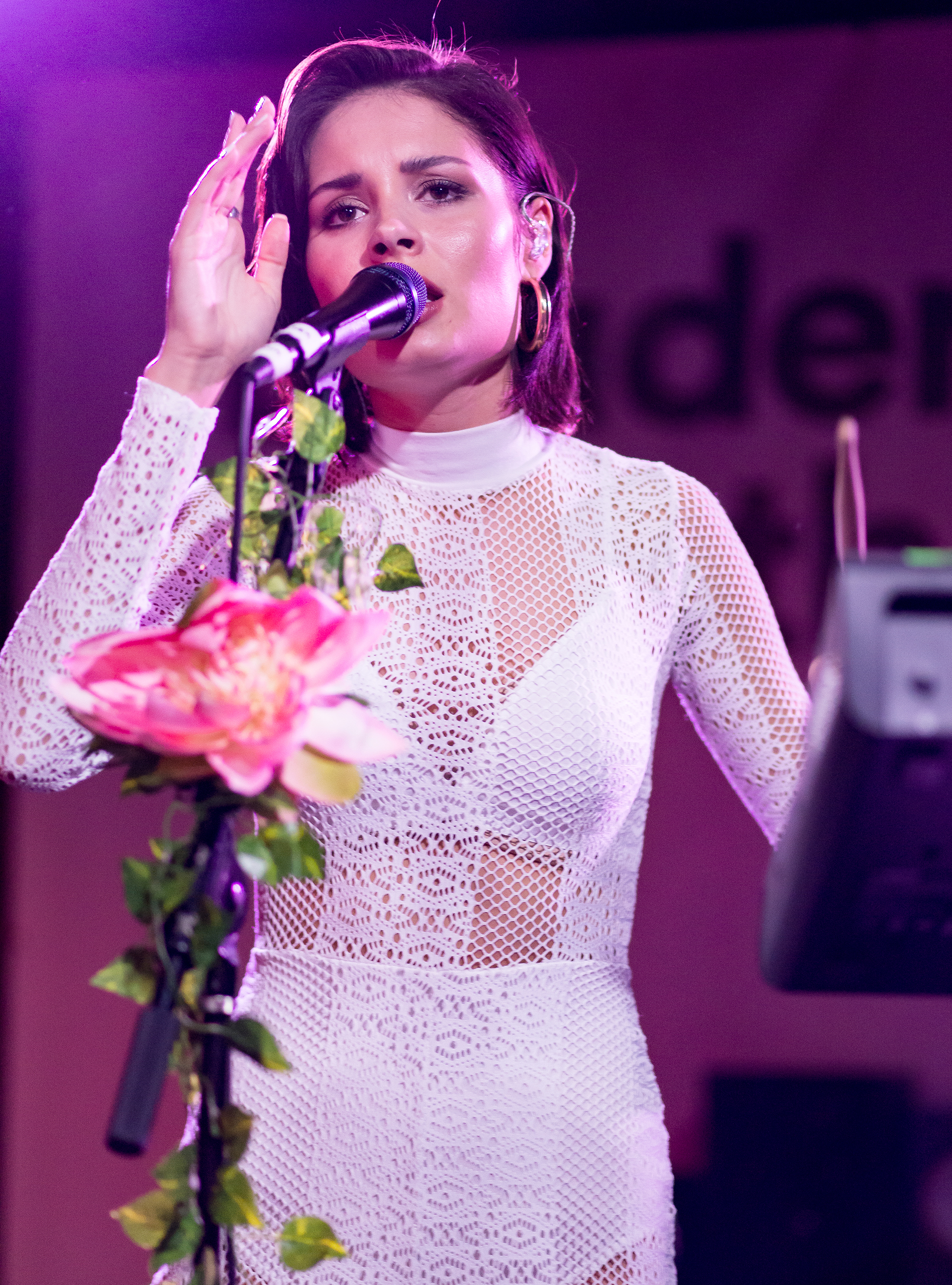
- Nesbitt performing live at the Spotify Sessions "Louder Together" event in Los Angeles, California, on 24 March 2018
- Studio albums: 4
- EPs: 8
- Singles: 35
- Music videos: 29

The discography of the Scottish singer-songwriter Nina Nesbitt consists of 4 studio albums, 8 extended plays (EP), 35 singles and 6 guest appearances. Her debut studio album Peroxide was released on 17 February 2014 via Universal Music Group. It peaked in the United Kingdom at 11, in Ireland at 40 and in Scotland at 1. Her second studio album The Sun Will Come Up, the Seasons Will Change was released on 1 February 2019 via Cooking Vinyl. On 13 September 2019, Nesbitt announced the deluxe edition of her second album, The Sun Will Come Up, the Seasons Will Change & the Flowers Will Fall, would be released on 15 November 2019.

== Studio albums ==
Title	Details	Peak chart positions			
Title	Details	UK	BEL (WA)	IRE	SCO
Peroxide	Released: 17 February 2014; Label: Universal Music Group; Formats: CD, digital download	11	—	40	1
The Sun Will Come Up, the Seasons Will Change	Released: 1 February 2019; Label: Cooking Vinyl; Formats: CD, digital download	21	—	43	5
Älskar	Released: 2 September 2022; Label: Cooking Vinyl; Formats: CD, digital download	34	117	—	3
Mountain Music	Released: 27 September 2024; Label: Apple Tree; Formats: CD, digital download	46	—	—	3
"—" denotes an album that did not chart or was not released.

== Extended plays ==
Title	Details
Live Take EP	Released: 5 December 2011; Label: Universal Music Group; Formats: Digital download, limited physical copies
The Apple Tree	Released: 23 April 2012, 20 July 2012; Label: Universal Music Group; Formats: Digital download, limited physical copies
Boy	Released: 6 December 2012; Label: Universal Music Group; Format: Digital download
Stay Out	Released: 8 April 2013; Label: Universal Music Group; Formats: Digital download, limited physical copies
Way in the World	Released: 21 July 2013; Label: Universal Music Group; Formats: Digital download, limited physical copies
Nina Nesbitt	Released: 1 April 2014; Label: Universal Music Group; Format: Digital download
Modern Love	Released: 5 February 2016; Label: Universal Music Group; Formats: Digital download, limited physical copies
Life in Colour	Released: 10 October 2016; Label: N²; Formats: Digital download, limited physical copies

== Singles ==
Title	Year	Peak chart positions					Certifications	Album
Title	Year	UK	BEL (FL)	BEL (WA)	IRE	SCO	Certifications	Album
"Boy"	2012	139	—	—	—	71		Boy
"Stay Out"	2013	21	76	89	77	11		Stay Out and Peroxide
"Way in the World"	2013	55	86	77	—	28		Way in the World
"Don't Stop"	2013	61	—	—	—	46		Peroxide
"Selfies"	2014	40	—	—	—	23		Peroxide
"Chewing Gum"	2016	—	—	—	—	43		Modern Love
"The Moments I'm Missing"	2017	—	—	—	—	—		The Sun Will Come Up, The Seasons Will Change
"The Best You Had"	2017	—	—	—	—	—	BPI: Silver	The Sun Will Come Up, The Seasons Will Change
"Somebody Special"	2018	89	—	—	78	—		The Sun Will Come Up, The Seasons Will Change
"Loyal to Me"	2018	—	86	—	—	84		The Sun Will Come Up, The Seasons Will Change
"Colder"	2018	—	—	—	—	—		The Sun Will Come Up, The Seasons Will Change
"Is It Really Me You're Missing?"	2019	—	—	—	—	—		The Sun Will Come Up, The Seasons Will Change
"Love Letter"	2019	—	—	—	—	—		The Sun Will Come Up, The Seasons Will Change
"Afterhours" (with teamwork. and AJ Mitchell)	2019	—	—	—	—	—		Non-album single
"Without You" (with John Newman)	2019	—	—	—	—	21		A.N.I.M.A.L
"Black & Blue"	2019	—	—	—	—	—		The Sun Will Come Up, The Seasons Will Change
"Toxic"	2019	—	—	—	—	—		The Sun Will Come Up, The Seasons Will Change
"Last December (Christmas Version)"	2019	—	—	—	—	—		The Sun Will Come Up, The Seasons Will Change
"Together Forever"	2020	—	—	—	—	—		Non-album singles
"Miss You 2" (with Gabrielle Aplin)	2020	—	—	—	—	—		Non-album singles
"Cry Dancing" (with NOTD)	2020	—	—	—	—	—		Non-album singles
"Family Values" (with R3hab)	2020	—	—	—	—	—		Non-album singles
"Summer Fling"	2021	—	—	—	—	—		Älskar
"Life's a Bitch (L.A.B)"	2021	—	—	—	—	—		Älskar
"Sweet Dreams & Dynamite" (with Seeb)	2021	—	—	—	—	—		Non-album single
"When You Lose Someone"	2022	—	—	—	—	—		Älskar
"Dinner Table"	2022	—	—	—	—	—		Älskar
"Pressure Makes Diamonds"	2022	—	—	—	—	—		Älskar
"No Time (For My Life To Suck)"	2022	—	—	—	—	—		Älskar
"Colours of You"	2022	—	—	—	—	—		Älskar
"Need You" (featuring Zion Foster)	2022	—	—	—	—	—		Älskar Nights
"Make It Easy" (with Ben Earle)	2023	—	—	—	—	—		Non-album single
"Pages"	2024	—	—	—	—	—		Mountain Music
"On the Run"	2024	—	—	—	—	—		Mountain Music
"Mansion"	2024	—	—	—	—	—		Mountain Music
"I'm Coming Home"	2024	—	—	—	—	—		Mountain Music
"Anger"	2024	—	—	—	—	—		Mountain Music
"Caledonia"	2025	—	—	—	—	—		Non-album single
"Enough"	2025	—	—	—	—	—		Mountain Music (The Summit)
"She's All Time" (Dope Lemon featuring Nina Nesbitt)	2025	—	—	—	—	—		Golden Wolf
"—" denotes a single that did not chart or was not released.

=== Promotional singles ===
Title	Year	Album
"The Sun Will Come Up, The Seasons Will Change"	2018	The Sun Will Come Up, The Seasons Will Change

== Other appearances ==
Title	Year	Album
"Brand New Day" (acoustic version) (Kodaline featuring Nina Nesbitt)	2013	In a Perfect World
"What It Feels Like" (Feed Me featuring Nina Nesbitt)	2016	Feed Me's Family Reunion – EP
"Put It on for Me" (Don Diablo featuring Nina Nesbitt)	2018	Future
"Somebody" (Sigala with HRVY and Nina Nesbitt)	2018	Brighter Days
"Desperate" (Jonas Blue featuring Nina Nesbitt)	2018	Blue
"Let It Be Me" (Justin Jesso featuring Nina Nesbitt)	2019	Non-album single
"The Moments I'm Missing" (Ranji & WHITENO1SE featuring Nina Nesbitt)	2019	The Moments I'm Missing
"Luv Me A Little" (Illenium featuring Nina Nesbitt)	2023	ILLENIUM
"Feather On The Clyde" (Passenger featuring Nina Nesbitt)	2023	All The Little Lights (Anniversary Edition)

== Songwriting credits ==
Song	Year	Artist	Album
"Me, Myself and You"	2024	Perrie	Perrie
"If He Wanted to He Would"	2025	Perrie	Perrie
"Sand Dancer"	2025	Perrie	Perrie
"Punchline"	2025	Perrie	Perrie
"Where You Are"	2025	Perrie	Perrie
"Passenger Princess"	2026	Perrie	Non-album single

== Music videos ==
Title	Year	Ref.
"The Apple Tree"	2012	
"Boy"	2012	
"Make Me Fall"	2012	
"Stay Out"	2013	
"Just Before Goodbye"	2013	
"Statues"	2013	
"No Interest"	2013	
"Way in the World"	2013	
"Selfies"	2013	
"The Hardest Part"	2014	
"Don't Stop"	2014	
"Chewing Gum"	2016	
"What It Feels Like"	2016	
"The Moments I'm Missing"	2017	
"The Best You Had"	2017	
"Somebody Special"	2018	
"Put It On For Me"	2018	
"Loyal to Me"	2018	
"Colder"	2019	
"Is It Really Me You're Missing?"	2019	
"Desperate"	2019	
"Love Letter"	2019	
"Afterhours"	2019	
"Let it Be Me"	2019	
"Miss You 2"	2020	
"Cry Dancing"	2020	
"Long Run"	2020	
"Summer Fling"	2021	
"Life's A Bitch"	2021	
"O Holy Night"	2021	
"When You Lose Someone"	2022	
"Dinner Table"	2022	
"Pressure Makes Diamonds"	2022	
"No Time (For My Life To Suck)"	2022	
"Colours Of You"	2022	
"I Should Be A Bird"	2022	
"Need You"	2022	
"Älskar"	2022	
"Christmas Time Again"	2023	
"Feather On The Clyde"	2023	
"Anger"	2024	
