= Selfie (disambiguation) =

A selfie is a self-photograph, a style of portraiture that became popular in the 2000s.

Selfie or selfies may also refer to:

- Selfie (TV series), a 2014 American sitcom starring Karen Gillan and John Cho
- Selfie (2014 film), a Romanian film
- Selfie (2018 film), a Russian film
- Selfie (2019 film), a French film
- Selfie (2022 film), an Indian film
- Selfiee, a 2023 Indian film
- Selfie (album), a 2014 album by the Italian singer Mina
- "#Selfie" (song), a 2014 song by the American DJ duo the Chainsmokers, stylized "#SELFIE"
- "Selfies" (song), a 2014 song by the Scottish singer-songwriter Nina Nesbitt
- "Selfie", a 2015 song by the Serbian singer Milica Pavlović
- Selfie: How We Became So Self-obsessed and What It's Doing to Us, a 2017 book by journalist Will Storr

== See also ==
- Selphie Tilmitt, a character in the video game Final Fantasy VIII
