= Older Guys =

Older Guys may refer to:

- "Older Guys", a song by Nina Nesbitt from Älskar (2022)
- "Older Guys", a song by The Flying Burrito Brothers from Burrito Deluxe (1970)
