= Nina Nesbitt =

Scottish singer-songwriter (born 1994)

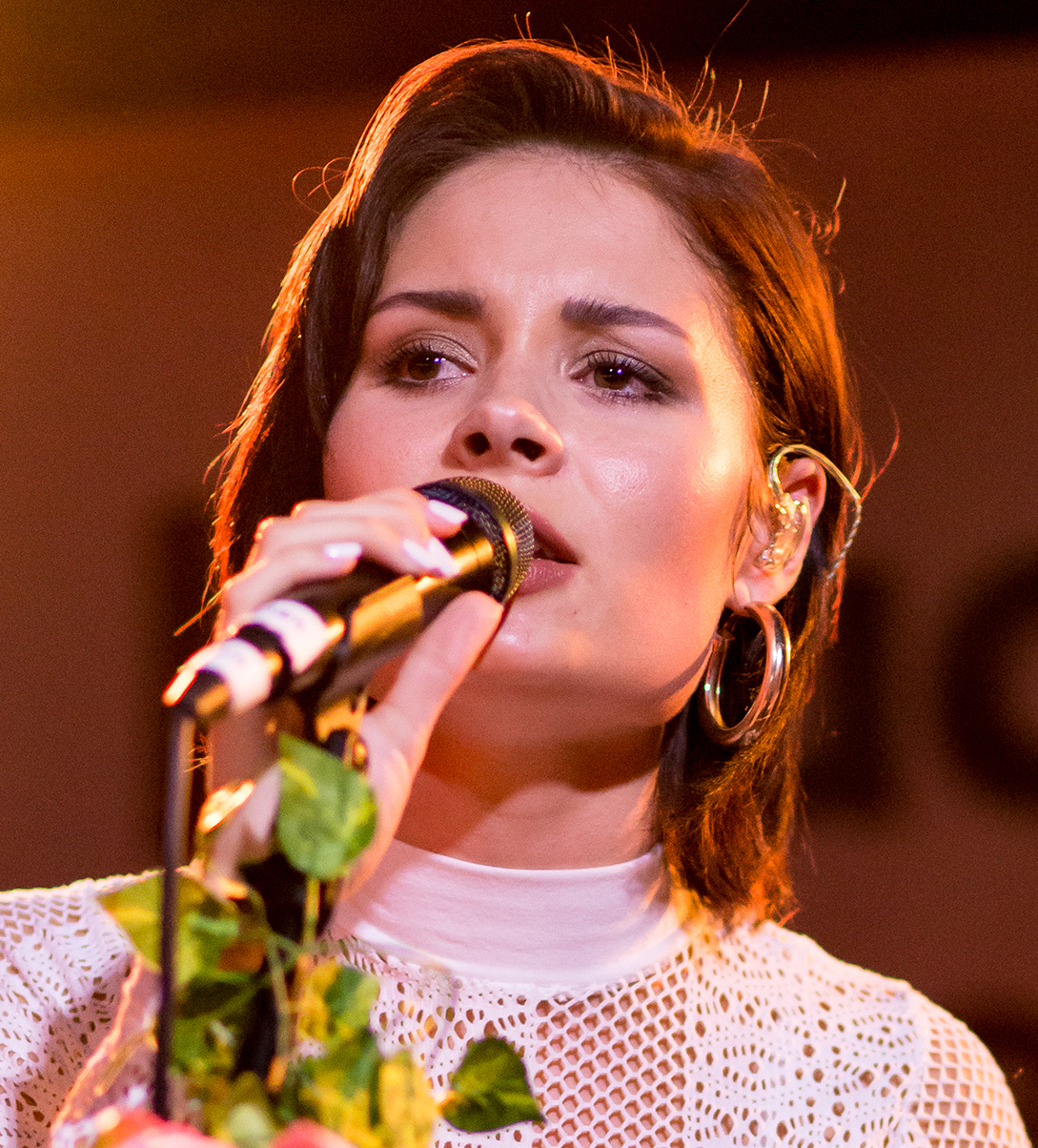
- Nesbitt performing at Spotify Sessions, 2018

Background information
- Born: 11 July 1994 (age 32); Livingston, West Lothian, Scotland
- Origin: Balerno, Edinburgh, Scotland
- Genres: Pop; indie folk; indie rock; R&B; electropop; hip hop
- Occupations: Singer; songwriter; musician
- Instruments: Vocals; guitar; keyboards
- Works: Discography
- Years active: 2011–present
- Labels: Universal; Island; Cooking Vinyl; Apple Tree
- Website: ninanesbittmusic.com

Nina Lindberg Nesbitt (born 11 July 1994) is a Scottish singer-songwriter and musician. She is best known for her UK and Scottish top 40 hit singles "Stay Out" and "Selfies". She also earned further recognition with her rendition of Fleetwood Mac's "Don't Stop" which was featured in an advert for the department store John Lewis.

Nesbitt released her debut studio album, Peroxide in February 2014, which debuted at No. 1 in her native Scotland. Her follow-up records, The Sun Will Come Up, the Seasons Will Change (2019) and Älskar (2022), also performed well, with all reaching inside the top 5 in the Scottish Album Charts. In 2024, she formed her own record label Apple Tree Records and released her fourth studio album Mountain Music, which debuted at No. 3 on Scotland, topped the UK Folk Albums Chart and became her most critically acclaimed record to date.

In addition to her solo work, she has written songs for other artists, including Jessie Ware, Olivia Holt, Perrie, Jasmine Thompson and the Shires, and has also collaborated with Passenger. She has supported live artists such as Stevie Nicks, Jake Bugg, Justin Bieber, and Lewis Capaldi.

== Early life ==
Nesbitt was born on 11 July 1994 in Livingston, to Mike, a Scottish manager in the defence industry, and Caty, a Swedish social worker. She attended the small village school in Bellsquarry, Livingston. At 12, she moved to Balerno, a suburb of Edinburgh, and attended Balerno Community High School. She studied music at Stevenson College, Edinburgh.

Nesbitt plays the guitar, piano and flute. She began playing the guitar at the age of fifteen. After hearing Taylor Swift's album Fearless (2008), she uploaded her first cover to YouTube. A friend from school agreed to record videos of her playing songs for her YouTube channel, for £20 a time. Positive feedback inspired her to continue writing and recording songs in her bedroom, as well as to continue uploading more videos.

As a child, she competed in regional and national gymnastic competitions for both Pentland Rhythmic Gymnastics Club and Scotland. She was also part of the Scottish team training for the Commonwealth Games. At age 14, Nesbitt also started modelling, due to her love of fashion. Nesbitt was registered to Colours modelling agency, based in Glasgow. She quit modelling before pursuing music as she did not like the industry, claiming it put out a "negative message." However, Nesbitt has since modelled for Yumi, Jack Wills, Calvin Klein and American Eagle.

== Career ==
=== 2011–2013: Early career ===
Nesbitt released her debut extended play Live Take under the independent label N2 Records on December 5, 2011. She then met musician Ed Sheeran before a radio gig he was scheduled to perform in Edinburgh. After asking him for advice for aspiring singer-songwriters, and playing him a song on his guitar, she was invited to support him on his European tour. She was also invited to support Example after he heard her cover of his song "Stay Awake". She also appeared in the music video for Sheeran's single "Drunk".

Her second EP, The Apple Tree, was released in April 2012 via AWAL and reached No. 6 on the iTunes download charts after receiving airplay on BBC Radio 1, and also reached No. 1 on the iTunes singer/songwriter chart. On 9 October 2012, Nesbitt embarked on her second UK headline tour, to support the release of her debut single, "Boy", under new label, Island Records. The tour included support from singer-songwriter Josh Kumra and singer-songwriter Billy Lockett. The tour commenced on 9 October 2012 at Òran Mór, Glasgow, Scotland and finished on 18 October 2012 at Dingwalls, London, England. Her third EP, Stay Out, was released on 8 April 2013; its title track of the same name entered the charts at No. 21 in April 2013. Her next EP, Way in the World, was released on 21 July 2013. The title track was released as a single, and the music video released on 12 June 2013. Nesbitt's next single was a cover of the Fleetwood Mac song, "Don't Stop", and is used in an advert for the department store John Lewis. On 6 September 2013, Nesbitt sang "Flower of Scotland" at Hampden Park before Scotland played Belgium in a Group A World Cup Qualifier.

=== 2013–2016: Peroxide ===
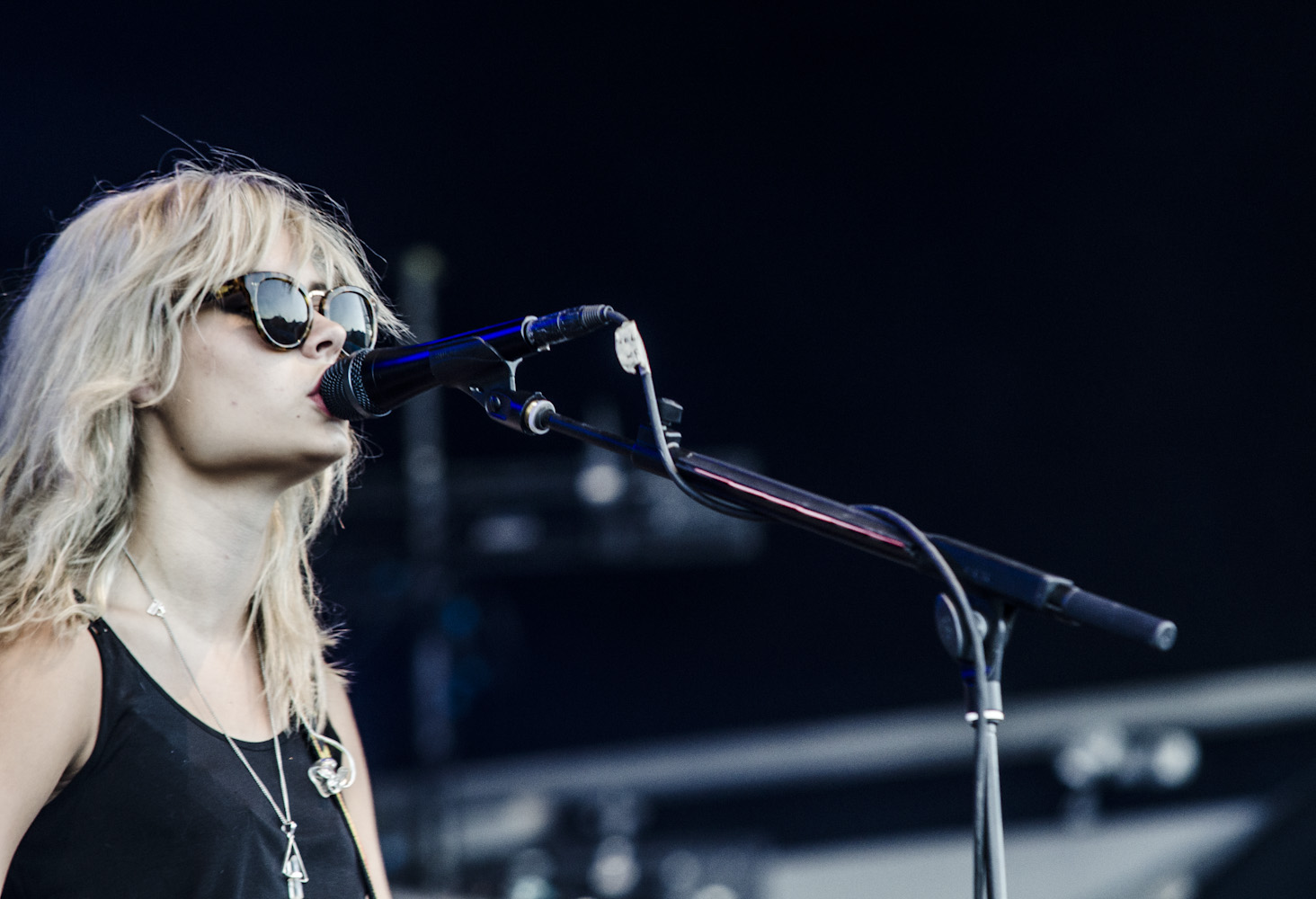
Nesbitt performing live at the FIB Festival in Benicàssim, Spain, 2014

On 25 November 2013, Nesbitt announced on her Twitter and Facebook pages that her debut studio album, Peroxide, would be released on 17 February 2014 in the United Kingdom. Nesbitt did an album signing tour around the UK, starting in Edinburgh on the day the album was released. Peroxide entered the UK Album Charts at number 1 in Scotland and 11 in the rest of the UK. The lead single from the album, "Selfies" was released on 9 February 2014. She released her fifth EP, Nina Nesbitt, exclusively in the US on 1 April 2014. In 2016, Nesbitt announced the release of her newest EP, Modern Love, featuring her "radical new look." She also announced a three-date UK Tour, that took place from 26 to 28 January.

Following its World Exclusive on Radio 1, her single "Chewing Gum" became available for download on Apple Music and Spotify on 10 January. On 27 April, Nesbitt performed at the Young Scot Awards at Edinburgh's International Conference Centre. In June, she started the project Songs I Wrote for You, where she asked her fans to send her their personal love stories and she would write a song about it. In October 2016, she released a five-track EP titled Life in Colour with the songs of the project under her own label.

=== 2016–2019: The Sun Will Come Up, the Seasons Will Change ===
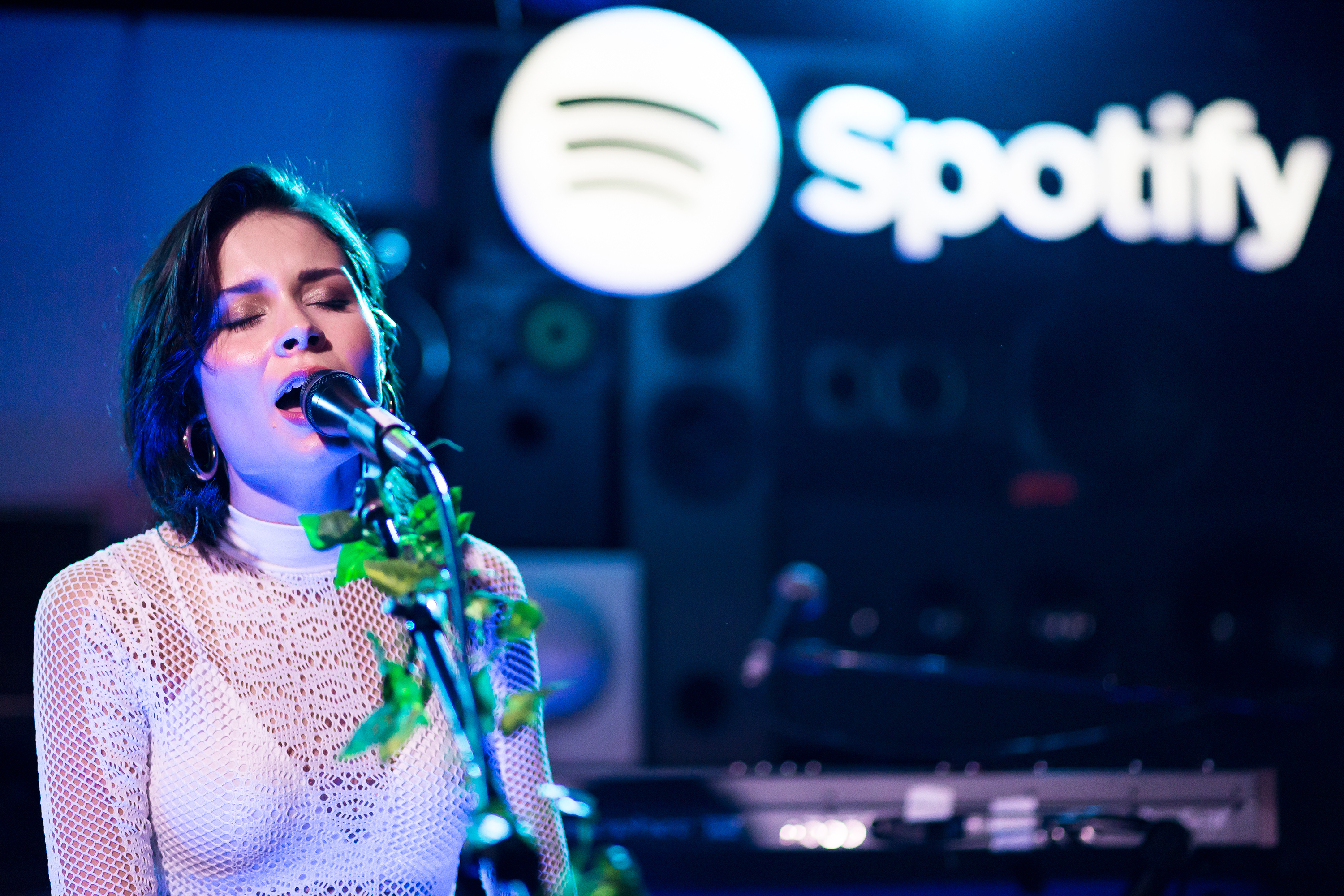
Nesbitt performing live at the Spotify sessions "Louder Together" in 2018

In May 2016, Nesbitt disclosed that she had left her record label and was now an independent artist. In November 2016, Nesbitt signed a recording contract with indie label Cooking Vinyl. On 2 July 2017, she served as a supporting act for Justin Bieber during British Summer Time in Hyde Park, London. She released a new single, "The Moments I'm Missing", on 14 July 2017. On 8 September 2017 she released her next single, "The Best You Had", which was made Greg James' 'Tune of the Week' on Radio 1 and added to the Radio 1 playlist. Taylor Swift later added "The Best You Had" to her 'Favourite Songs' playlist on Apple Music and Spotify, while actress Chloë Grace Moretz tweeted about the song to her followers. Nesbitt then released "Somebody Special" as the third single from her second album. In October 2017, she played two intimate shows in New York City and Los Angeles. In December 2017, Nesbitt won the 'Evolution Award' at the SSE Scottish Music Awards.

Between March and April 2018, Nesbitt toured the United States with Jake Bugg. She also revealed new track "Psychopath" for the launch of Spotify's 'Louder Together', a program bringing artists together to collaborate on an original Spotify Singles song in the spirit of community, empowerment and inspiration. The titular track "The Sun Will Come Up, the Seasons Will Change" was released as a promotional single in May. Nesbitt has said that it is "like a self-help song and she hopes that people can listen to it in times of need and be reminded that things are constantly changing". The song was also featured in an episode of Life Sentence, an American television series. In summer 2018, Nesbitt played twelve festivals in the UK, and also performed at SXSW, Midem and The Great Escape. She later sold out three consecutive London shows (at Heaven, The Islington and Camden Assembly), and supported acts such as James Arthur, Jesse McCartney, MAX and Lewis Capaldi on tours.

On 10 August 2018, Nesbitt released her fourth single from the album, "Loyal to Me", which was produced by Fraser T. Smith. In October 2018, Nesbitt announced that her second album, The Sun Will Come Up, the Seasons Will Change will be released on 1 February 2019 through Cooking Vinyl.

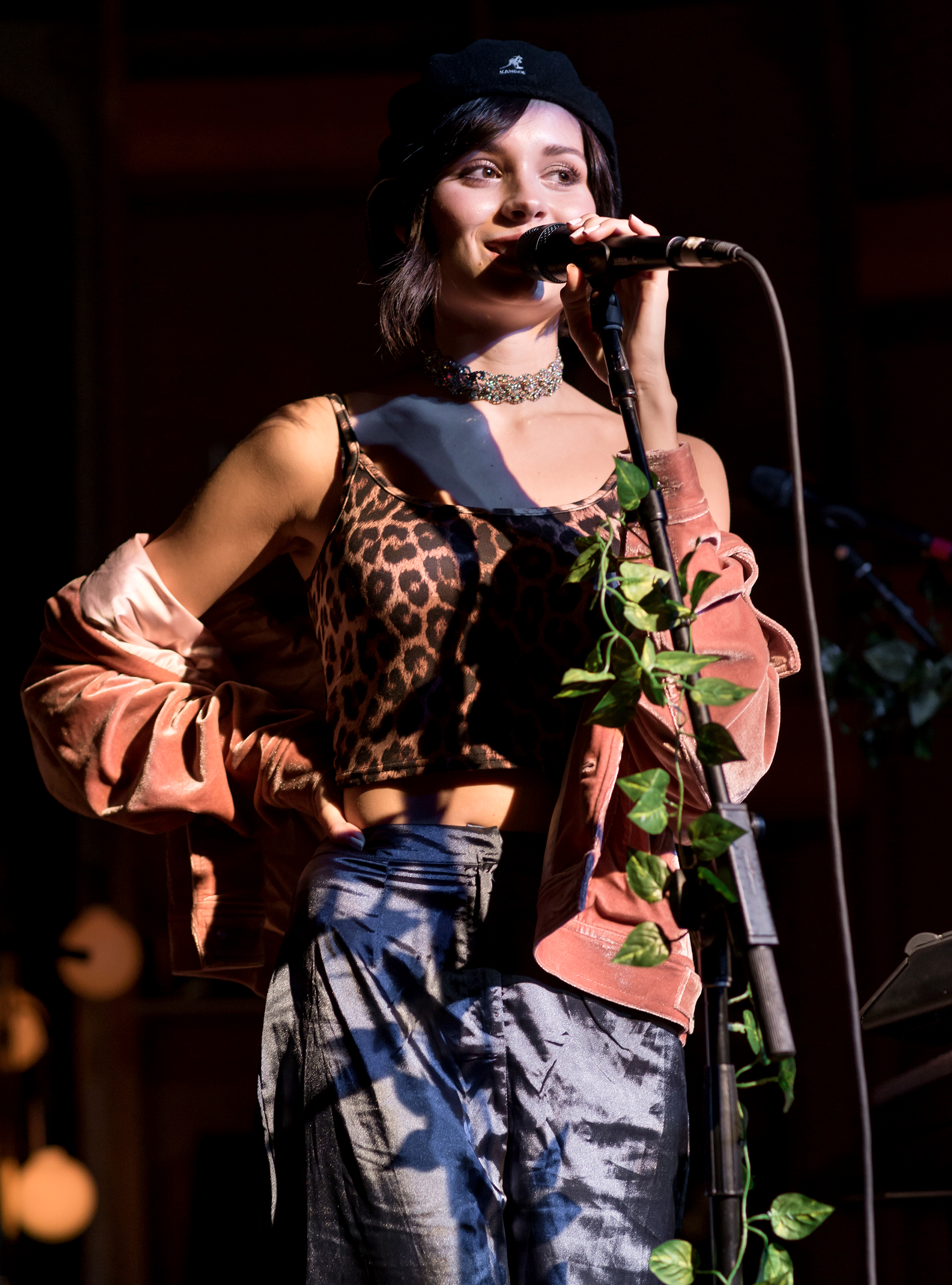
Nesbitt performing at The Peppermint Club, Los Angeles, California, United States, 2017

The Sun Will Come Up, the Seasons Will Change was released on 1 February 2019, to a positive critic reaction. The Independent awarded the record four stars and The Times gave it three, whilst CelebMix awarded the album five stars saying, "February is far too early to talk about albums of the year. But, really, is it going to get better than this?". On the same day, Nesbitt also released a new music video for her fifth single from the album, titled "Is It Really Me You're Missing?". Nesbitt then embarked on a headlining tour to support The Sun Will Come Up, the Seasons Will Change, with the North American and UK legs spanning from February to April. She also toured in Australia and New Zealand from 28 May to 1 June. In March 2019, it was announced that Nesbitt would be supporting Jess Glynne on the American leg of the Always in Between Tour.

=== 2020–present: Älskar, Mountain Music, other appearances ===
Leading up to the release of her third studio album, Älskar, on 2 September 2022, Nesbitt released several singles including "Summer Fling" and "Life's a Bitch" (which are featured as bonus tracks on the deluxe version of the album). Further songs released prior to the albums official release that are included on the standard edition of the album include: "When You Lose Someone", "Dinner Table", "Pressure Makes Diamonds", "No Time (For My Life to Suck)", and "Colours of You". Beginning in November 2022, Nesbitt will tour her album throughout the United Kingdom and Europe.

In 2023, K-pop band IVE released EP Wave, which featured the original track Classic, a song Nesbitt had co-written.

On March 4, 2024, Nesbitt announced the launching of her own record label Apple Tree Records, along with the release of a double single "Pages" and "On The Run" both serving as the label first releases, as well as the first tracks of her upcoming fourth studio album. On April 22, she announced that the record was named Mountain Music and was set to be released on September 27.

On July 2, 2024, Nesbitt was announced as the opening act for Stevie Nicks concerts in the United Kingdom. Later on, in July 24, She announced she was going on a headliner tour in the UK, to promote the record with dates for October. Mountain Music was released on September 27, to generally positive reviews.

On October 29, 2024, Nesbitt served as a guest for Billboard where she wrote a column about her experience owning a record label. On November 3, 2024, Nesbitt was honored with the SGW3 Independent Icon Award by the Scottish Music Awards.

In August 2025, Nesbitt appeared in the music video for Perrie Edwards’ single "If He Wanted to He Would", which was co-written by Nesbitt. Nesbitt also worked with Edwards as a co-writer, on the tracks "Me, Myself and You", "Sand Dancer", "Punchline" and "Where You Are" from Edwards self-titled debut album, Perrie. On the track "Where You Are", Nesbitt also provides background vocals and played the electric guitar.

== Philanthropy ==
Nesbitt was part of the mothers2mothers fund raising dinner, raising half a million pounds for the charity. She also attended the Women in the World Summit, discussing the impact of body image in the Internet era.

She has worked with brands such as Calvin Klein and American Eagle and was chosen to attend the Women in the World Summit alongside Nicole Kidman and Cara Delevingne.

== Personal life ==
Nesbitt was in a relationship with singer-songwriter Ed Sheeran in 2012. She appeared in his music video for "Drunk" in January 2012. She wrote most of her album Peroxide (2014) about Sheeran, while she was the subject of Sheeran's songs "Nina", "Friends" and "Photograph". Nesbitt is well known for being an ex of Sheeran's due to the publicity around the relationship at the time, and claims she finds it 'disheartening' that people associate her with this rather than her music.

In December 2012, shortly after her breakup from Sheeran, Nesbitt started dating Mike Duce from the band Lower Than Atlantis. They broke up in early 2013. Nesbitt wrote the song "'Last December", about her early relationship with Duce. Nesbitt and Duce got back together in 2015, after he took her to a Foo Fighters gig. He is also the subject of her later songs "Summer Fling", and "Colours of You". Nesbitt had a cat called Bob Marley, after the singer songwriter. She later gave up Bob Marley to her mother, Caty. Nesbitt now has a Pomeranian dog called Timmy that she got during lockdown.

In 2016, Nesbitt reported that two people were stalking her.

Nesbitt's parents divorced in 2024 and no longer live in Edinburgh. Nesbitt described their split as "a big moment, a big change" and a "huge part of what (she) was going through".

As of 2024, Nesbitt was managed by Vicky Dowdall, who is co-founder of Nesbitt label, Apple Tree Records.

== Discography ==
- Peroxide (2014)
- The Sun Will Come Up, the Seasons Will Change (2019)
- Älskar (2022)
- Mountain Music (2024)

== Awards and nominations ==
List of awards and nominations received by Nina Nesbitt
Year	Award	Nominated work	Category	Result	Ref
2013	Scottish Music Awards	Herself	Best Emerging Artist	Won	
2017	Scottish Music Awards	Herself	Evolution Award	Won	
2021	Scottish Music Awards	Herself	Women in Music Award	Won	
2024	Electronic Dance Music Awards	Herself	Vocalist Of The Year	Nominated	
2024	Electronic Dance Music Awards	"Luv Me A Little" (shared with Illenium) [BONNIE X CLYDE Remix]	Best Down Tempo Turned Up	Won	
2024	Scottish Music Awards	Herself	Independent Icon Award	Won	
2024	UK Americana Music Awards	Mountain Music	UK Album of the Year	Nominated	
2024	UK Americana Music Awards	"Pages"	UK Song of the Year	Nominated	

== Authored work ==
- Nesbitt, Nina (24 November 2025) "30 Things I Know At 30" Substack.
- Nesbitt, Nina (28 November 2025) "It's Nice To Feel Nice" Substack.
- Nesbitt, Nina (1 December 2025) "The Magic of Songwriting" Substack
