= Tears (Perrie Edwards song) =

Single by Perrie
- Released: 21 June 2024
- Genre: Pop; dance-pop
- Length: 2:55
- Label: Columbia
- Composers: Feli Ferraro; Ido Zmishlany
- Lyricist: Ferraro
- Producer: Zmishlany

Perrie singles chronology
"Forget About Us" (2024)	"Tears" (2024)	"You Go Your Way" (2024)

Music video
- "Tears" on YouTube

"Tears" is a song by English singer Perrie. It was released on 21 June 2024, through Columbia Records, and was later included on the fan edition of her debut album, Perrie (2025). The song is about coming out of a bad situation and letting go of what has happened in the past. The single debuted at number 69 on the UK Singles Chart and charted for one week.

== Background and release ==
After the release of her debut single "Forget About Us", Perrie teased her new song through a 'No Tears Hotline', in which a voicemail could be heard playing a snippet of the track. Having already hinted at the song's title across her and her team's socials, she released playlists of its reference points and called on her team to describe its sound. On 7 June 2024, she revealed its artwork, release date and the song was released on 21 June 2024.

== Composition and lyrics ==
Prior to its release date, Carl Smith from Official Charts, described "Tears" as "a smooth, '80s-tinged break-up anthem, that sees "Perrie break new ground sonically as she sends some strong parting words to an ex". The song was given to her during a writing session in Los Angeles, by the head of Columbia Records. It was written by Feli Ferraro and produced by Ido Zmishlany.

== Music video ==
The official music video of the song was released on 30 June 2024. The theme of the video was the 1970s.

== Commercial performance ==
The single debuted at number sixty-nine on the UK Singles Chart. The song peaked at number eight on the Official Big Top 40 from Global.

== Promotion and live performances ==
On 16 June 2024, "Tears" received its first performance at Capital FM's Summertime Ball. On 12 July 2024, the song was performed on The One Show On 7 December 2024, the track was performed at Capital FM's Jingle Bell Ball

== Track listings and formats ==
7-inch vinyl, cassette and CD single

1. "Tears" – 2:55
2. "Tears" (extended) – 4:13
3. "Tears" (acapella) – 2:48

Streaming/digital download

1. "Tears" – 2:55
2. "Tears" (extended) – 4:13
3. "Tears" (instrumental) – 2:55
4. "Tears" acapella) – 2:48

Streaming/digital download – Extended acapella

1. "Tears" (extended acapella) – 3:18

Streaming/digital download – Extended instrumental

1. "Tears" (extended instrumental) – 4:13

Streaming/digital download – Live Piano session

1. "Tears" (live piano session) – 2:56

== Charts ==
Chart performance for "Tears"
Chart (2024)	Peak position
UK Singles (OCC)	69

== Release history ==
"Tears" release history
Region	Date	Version	Format(s)	Label(s)	Ref.
Various	21 June 2024	Original; Extended; Instrumental; Acapella	7-inch vinyl; cassette; CD; digital download; streaming	Columbia	
Various	5 July 2024	Extended acapella	Digital download; streaming	Columbia	
Various	19 July 2024	Extended instrumental	Digital download; streaming	Columbia	
Various	26 July 2024	Live Piano session	Digital download; streaming	Columbia	
