= You Go Your Way =

Single by Perrie

from the album Perrie
- Released: 4 October 2024
- Genre: Pop; dance-pop
- Length: 3:54
- Label: Columbia
- Songwriters: Alfie Russel; Henry Counsell; Perrie Edwards
- Producers: Joy Anonymous; Russel

Perrie singles chronology
"Tears" (2024)	"You Go Your Way" (2024)	"Christmas Magic" (2024)

Music video
- "You Go Your Way" on YouTube

"You Go Your Way" is a song by English singer Perrie. It was released on 4 October 2024, through Columbia Records, as the second single from Perrie's debut album, Perrie (2025). The single debuted at number fifty-two on the UK Singles Chart.

== Background ==
Edwards teased the single's release date on 16 September 2024, after a clip was uploaded onto her social media pages, where fans had to decode the caption. On 20 September 2024, she revealed its artwork, release date and the song was released on 4 October 2024. On 26 September 2024, she shared a clip from the song.

== Composition and lyrics ==
The song was inspired by a prior conversation Edwards had with her fiancé English footballer Alex Oxlade-Chamberlain when they first started dating in November 2016. She recalled telling him she would not pressure him into committing to her and suggested they both focus on their own paths first and see what happens next.

== Music video ==
The music video of the song was directed by Charlie Di Placido and produced by Matt Craig. The video was filmed at Ace Cafe, North West London. It was released along with the single.

== Promotion and live performances ==
On 4 October 2024, "You Go Your Way" received its first performance on The Graham Norton Show. On 29 October 2024, Edwards performed "You Go Your Way" and a medley cover of "Die with a Smile" by Lady Gaga and Bruno Mars and "Wonderwall" by Oasis on BBC Radio 1's Live Lounge. On 7 December 2024, she performed the track at the Capital FM's Jingle Bell Ball.

== Track listings and formats ==
- 7-inch vinyl, cassette and CD single
1. "You Go Your Way" – 3:54
2. "Me, Myself & You" – 2:35
- Streaming/digital download
1. "You Go Your Way" – 3:54
2. "You Go Your Way" (karaoke version) – 3:55
3. "You Go Your Way" (acapella) – 3:52
4. "You Go Your Way" (instrumental) – 3:54
5. "You Go Your Way" (extended) – 5:59

Streaming/digital download – BBC Radio 1 Live Lounge session

1. "Die with a Smile" (BBC Radio 1 Live Lounge) – 3:13
2. "You Go Your Way" (BBC Radio 1 Live Lounge) – 2:37

Streaming/digital download – chilled version

1. "You Go Your Way" (chilled version) – 3:20

Streaming/digital download – club mix

1. "You Go Your Way" (club mix) – 3:59

Streaming/digital download – Jodie Harsh remix

1. "You Go Your Way" (Jodie Harsh remix) – 2:47

Streaming/digital download – rock version

1. "You Go Your Way" (rock version) – 3:26

== Charts ==
=== Weekly charts ===
Weekly chart performance for "You Go Your Way"
Chart (2024–2025)	Peak position
Estonia Airplay (TopHit)	33
Lithuania Airplay (TopHit)	12
UK Singles (Official Charts)	52

=== Monthly charts ===
Monthly chart performance for "You Go Your Way"
Chart (2024–2025)	Peak position
Estonia Airplay (TopHit)	39
Lithuania Airplay (TopHit)	37

== Release history ==
"You Go Your Way" release history
Region	Date	Version	Formats	Label	Ref.
Various	4 October 2024	original; karaoke; acapella; instrumental; extended	7-inch vinyl; cassette; CD; digital download; streaming	Columbia	
Various	18 October 2024	Jodie Harsh remix	Digital download; streaming	Columbia	
Various	1 November 2024	chilled; rock	Digital download; streaming	Columbia	
Various	27 December 2024	club mix	Digital download; streaming	Columbia	
Various	17 January 2025	BBC Radio 1 Live Lounge session	Digital download; streaming	Columbia	
