= If He Wanted to He Would =

2025 single by Perrie Edwards

Single by Perrie

from the album Perrie
- Released: 22 August 2025
- Genre: Country pop
- Length: 3:17
- Label: Columbia
- Songwriters: Perrie Edwards; Nina Nesbitt; Charlie Martin; Joe Housley
- Producers: Steven Solomon; the Nocturns

Perrie singles chronology
"Christmas Magic" (2024)	"If He Wanted to He Would" (2025)	"Miss You" (2025)

Music video
- "If He Wanted to He Would" on YouTube

"If He Wanted to He Would" is a song by the English singer Perrie. It was released on 22 August 2025 through Columbia Records as the third single from her debut studio album, Perrie (2025). A country pop song, it explores Perrie trying to support her friend into realising they are dating an unsupportive boyfriend.

== Background ==
In February 2025, Perrie released her single "Rollercoaster" after fans voted for it against another song. She then took a break from releasing songs to rework the concept for her debut studio album. Six months later, she returned by announcing the release of "If He Wanted to He Would". Perrie felt the song was more accurate to her own experiences and was proud of the musical direction it had taken her in.

== Composition and release ==
Two years prior to its release, co-writer Nina Nesbitt began a concept for the song, intending for it to be a slow R&B song. The song was not picked up by her label at the time, which frustrated her. Then, in a session with Perrie and the Nocturns, Perrie stated that she wanted to "write a song about being the one all the girls go to for advice", which inspired Nesbitt to revisit the song.

Rolling Stone noted that the song marks a country pop direction for Perrie. They also found it similar to the Little Mix song "Shout Out to My Ex", which she took as a compliment. Talking about the lyrical content of the song, Perrie remarked: "I realised that if I released another song about heartbreak, my fans would have gone into a downward spiral, but if I write about a friend going through it, it's kinda different! This situation happens so often in life, but from my own experience I was in a relationship for a very long time and sometimes you're so in love with someone [and] you devote so much time and energy that you don’t always see the red flags. In my experience, nobody told me that at the time".

== Music video ==
A music video premiered on YouTube on the day of the song's release. The video stars Perrie playing the best friend of a character portrayed by co-writer Nesbitt, where Perrie comforts her. The music video was inspired by numerous romcoms and included references to The Holiday, Mean Girls, Bridesmaids and Pretty Woman.

== Credits and personnel ==
Credits adapted from Spotify.

- Perrie Edwards – vocals, songwriting
- Nina Nesbitt – songwriting
- Charlie Martin – songwriting
- Joe Housley – songwriting
- Steven Soloman – production
- The Nocturns – production

== Commercial performance ==
"If He Wanted to He Would" debuted at number one on the Official Charts Company Trending Charts, marking her second number one after "Forget About Us".

== Charts ==
Chart performance
Chart (2025–2026)	Peak position
Estonia Airplay (TopHit)	84
Finland Airplay (Radiosoittolista)	33
Ireland (IRMA)	76
Lithuania Airplay (TopHit)	62
UK Singles (Official Charts)	44
Venezuela Anglo Airplay (Monitor Latino)	10

== Release history ==
"If He Wanted to He Would" release history
Region	Date	Format	Label	Ref.
Various	22 August 2025	Digital download; streaming	Columbia	
