= Scottish Music Awards =

Annual award ceremony

- Specsavers Scottish Music Awards
- Logo for the 2020 ceremony
- Awarded for: Recognition of outstanding contribution to Scottish music
- Sponsored by: Specsavers (2020–present); SSE (until 2020)
- Date: November 22, 1998 – present
- Location: Glasgow City Halls (2020); Barrowland Ballroom, Glasgow (2021–present)
- Country: Scotland
- Presented by: Edith Bowman (2020–present)
- Hosted by: Edith Bowman
- Formerly called: SSE Scottish Music Awards
- Campaign: Music therapy

Highlights
- Most awards: Lewis Capaldi (4)
- Scottish Album of the Year: Gun (2024) Hombres
- Icons Award: Lulu (2024)
- Outstanding Contribution Award: Travis (2024)
- Website: Scottish Music Awards
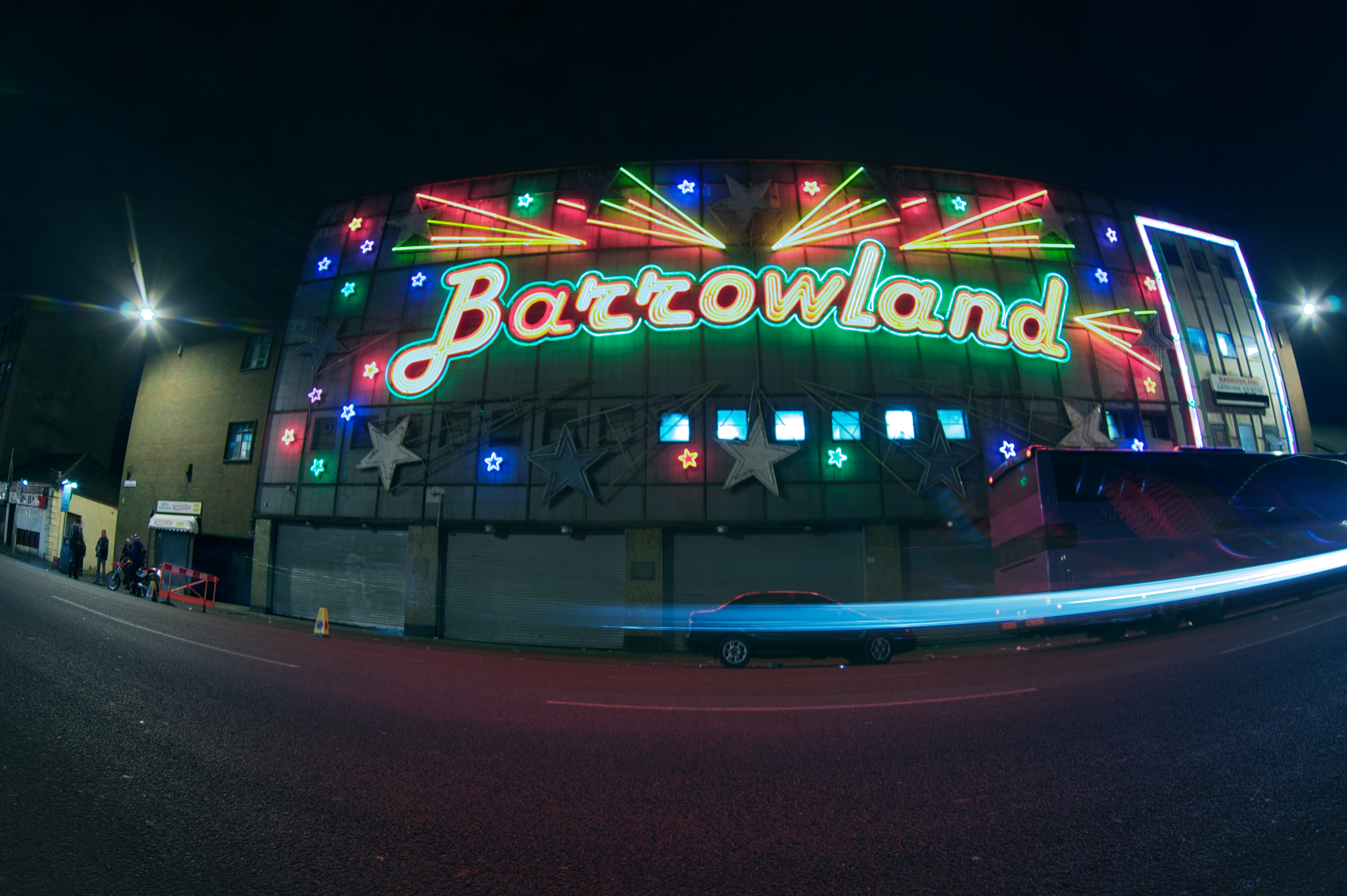
- Barrowland Ballroom in Glasgow has hosted the event since 2021

The Scottish Music Awards (Scottish Gaelic: Duaisean Ciùil na h-Alba) are an annual award ceremony held in Scotland to commemorate outstanding musical contribution by musicians over the past year to Scottish music and success on the Scottish Singles and Albums Charts. As of 2020, the awards have been held annually for 22 years. The Scottish Music Awards celebrated its 25th anniversary in 2023.

The 2020 ceremony was held on 28 November, dubbed as a "St. Andrew's Day celebration". Performances included Lewis Capaldi, Biffy Clyro, Texas, Amy Macdonald, Wet Wet Wet, Dougie MacLean, GUN, Stephanie Cheape, HYYTS, kitti, Luke La Volpe, George Bowie and Graeme Park.

== History ==
Over the course of the awards tenure, the awards have honoured some of the Scotland's biggest international musicians, including Annie Lennox and Susan Boyle, whilst celebrating Scotland's best up and coming musical artists, through breakthrough awards awarded to musicians Be Charlotte, Tom Walker and Lewis Capaldi.

The award ceremonies aim to raise funds for the UK's largest independent music therapy charity, Nordoff Robbins.

The Scottish Music Awards celebrated its 25th anniversary in 2023.

== 2024 Ceremony ==
The 26th Scottish Music Awards ceremony were held on 2 November 2024, again being held at the Barrowland Ballroom in Glasgow, and hosted by Edith Bowman. The following were recipients of awards during the 2024 ceremony of the awards:

=== Performances ===
Performances from the ceremony included Twin Atlantic, Nina Nesbitt, and Gun.

=== Winners ===
- Berkeley 2 Studios – Guitar Guitar Music Industry Award
- Beluga Lagoon – Barrowland Spotlight Award
- Blair Ferguson – Blur69 Sound of Scotland
- Calum Bowie – Beavertown's Breakthrough Award
- Country 2 Country – Ticketmaster's Tourmaster Award
- Eddi Reader – Special Recognition Award Sponsored by Specsavers
- Gun – Pizza Express Album of the Year
- Hannah Laing – Go Radio Breakthrough Award
- Harri and Domenic – Ballantines and Subclub Electronic Music Award
- Kyle Falconer – King Tuts’ Song Writing Award
- Lulu – Scottish Icon Award sponsored by Rox
- Nina Nesbitt – SWG3 Independent Icon Award
- Phil Bowdery – OVO Hydro Promoter of the Year Award
- Soup Dragons – Raymond Weil Lifetime Achievement Award
- Travis – Outstanding Achievement Award sponsored by the Sir Reo Stakis Foundation
- Twin Atlantic – Disruptor Award sponsored by Hard Rock Cafe Edinburgh

== Previous ceremonies ==
=== 2023 ===
The 2023 ceremony was hosted on November 4, 2023, once again by Edith Bowman. The event will again return to the Barrowland Ballroom in Glasgow for the third consecutive time since 2021.

The following artists were recipients of awards in 2023.

- Specsavers Global Artist Award – Elton John
- SWG3 Outstanding Achievement Award – Barbara Dickson
- Ticketmaster Tour Master Award – The Snuts
- P&J Live Spotlight Award – Dead Pony
- Raymond Weil Heritage Award – Middle of the Road
- Vega Breakthrough Award – Katie Gregson-MacLeod

=== 2022 ===
The 2022 Awards were held at Barrowland Ballroom in Glasgow on 5 November 2022. The ceremony was once again hosted by Edith Bowman.

Performances included The View, Tamzene, Rianne Downey, Dylan John Thomas, Altered Images and Rod Stewart.

2022 Winners include:

- Clare Grogan (Altered Images) – Winner of the Sir Reo Stakis Foundation Living Legend Award
- Craig Logan – Winner of the Go Radio Music Industry Award
- Dylan John Thomas – Winner of the Dean Banks & Mond Vodka Breakthrough Artist Award
- Ewan McVicar – Winner of the Ballantine's / Sub Club Electronic Music Award
- Gerry Cinnamon – Winner of the King Tut's Songwriting Award
- Gun – Winner of the Hard Rock Cafe Rock Legend Award
- Lewis Capaldi – Winner of the Raymond Weil Global Artist of the Year Award
- Paolo Nutini – Winner of the Guitar Guitar's Best Album Award AND Ticketmaster's Best Live Act Award
- Peat & Diesel – Winner of the Royal Highland Centre Sound of Scotland Award
- Rianne Downey – Winner of the Tennent's Light Breakthrough Award
- Rod Stewart – Winner of the Specsavers Outstanding Achievement in Music Award
- Tamzene – Winner of the VEGA Rising Star Award
- The View – Winner of the Rox ‘Diamonds & Thrills’ Special Recognition Award
- Wet Leg – Winner of the SWG3's Best UK Artist Award

=== 2021 ===
The event was held on Saturday 13 November 2021 in Barrowland Ballroom in Glasgow, marking the first time in the events history that it has been held at the venue. The event was once again hosted by Edith Bowman, and marked the live return for the event following the virtual ceremony that took place in 2020 due to the COVID-19 pandemic in Scotland.

The winners in the following categories are listed below:

- Specsavers Outstanding Achievement Award – Amy Macdonald
- Sir Reo Stakis Legends Award – The Bluebells
- Pizza Express Best Pop Act – Bow Anderson
- Best Female Breakthrough (sponsored by Tennent's Light) – Brooke Combe
- King Tut's Wah Wah Hut Songwriting Award – The Fratellis
- Best Male Breakthrough (sponsored by Dirt Comms and KHOLE) – Nathan Evans
- Women in Music Award (sponsored by ROX – Diamonds & Thrills) – Nina Nesbitt
- Best UK Award (sponsored by SWG3) – Sam Fender
- guitarguitar Best Album – The Snuts
- OVO Energy Eco Award – KT Tunstall
- Raymond Weil Icon Award – Wet Wet Wet
- Ticketmaster Best Live Award – Biffy Clyro

Performances were part of the event and featured performances from artists including:

- The Bluebells
- Brooke Combe
- The Fratellis
- Nathan Evans
- Nina Nesbitt

=== 2020 ===
The 2020 ceremony was hosted by Edith Bowman in the west end of Glasgow. The event was held virtually due to COVID-19 restrictions.

The following artists received awards during the 2020 ceremony.

- Ambassadors of Rock Award sponsored by Hard Rock Cafe – Gun
- Best Album Award sponsored by Guitar Guitar – Biffy Clyro
- Best Breakthrough Award sponsored by Notion Magazine – Luke La Volpe (Male) and kitti (Female)
- Best Pop Act Award sponsored by Bose – HYYTS
- Best UK Award sponsored by SSE – Lewis Capaldi
- Icons Award sponsored by Raymond Weil – Texas
- Innovation Award sponsored by SSE – Graeme Park – Hacienda Classics
- Nordoff Robbins Legend Award – George Bowie
- Outstanding Contribution Award sponsored by Specsavers – Wet Wet Wet
- Special Recognition Award sponsored by Sir Reo Stakis
- Foundation – Dougie MacLean
- Women in Music Award sponsored by Rox – Amy Macdonald

=== 2019 ===
The 2019 nominations for the award ceremony were:

- Scottish Music Award – Liam Gallagher
- Barrowlands Best Album Award – Tom Walker
- Outstanding Contribution to Music Award – Simple Minds
- Best Breakthrough Artist – Joesef
- Best Rock Band – Twin Atlantic
- Songwriting Award – Lewis Capaldi
- Electronic Music Award – Auntie Flo
- Evolution Award – Be Charlotte

=== 2018 ===
The nominations for the 2018 ceremony were:

- Susan Boyle: Scottish Music Hall of Fame Award sponsored by The Royal Highland Centre
- Éclair Fifi: Electronic Music Award sponsored by Sub Club
- Kyle Falconer: Best Album Award sponsored by Hard Rock Cafe
- SWG3: Evolution Award sponsored by The Sunday Mail
- The Snuts: Breakthrough Artist Award sponsored by Rekorderlig
- Annie Lennox: Scottish Music Hall of Fame Award sponsored by The Royal Highland Centre
- Snow Patrol: Artist of the Year Award sponsored by SSE
- Mark Knopfler: Living Legend Award sponsored by Raymond Weil
- World Pipe Band Championships: Glasgow UNESCO City of Music, Best Live Event Award
- Kevin Bridges: Ticketmaster Tourmaster Award
- Gary Clark: Music Business Award sponsored by The Sir Reo Stakis Foundation
- Frightened Rabbit: The King Tut's Wah Wah Hut Songwriting Award
- The Script: Best International Artist Award sponsored by Specsavers
- Tom Grennan: Best UK Artist Award sponsored by ROX – Diamonds and Thrills

=== 2017 ===
The winners of the 2017 ceremony were:

- ‘Song Writing Award’ Sponsored by King Tut's Wah Wah Hut – Emeli Sandé
- ‘Best Rock Band Award’ Sponsored by Hard Rock Heals – The Temperance Movement
- ‘Electronic Music Award’ Sponsored by Sub Club – Denis Sulta
- ‘Exceptional Contribution’ Sponsored by Sub Club – SLAM
- 'Best Breakthrough Artist Award’ Sponsored by Jack Daniel's – Lewis Capaldi
- Scottish Music Hall of Fame Award’ Sponsored by The Royal Highland Centre – Ian Stewart
- ‘Music Ambassador Award’ Sponsored by Sir Reo Stakis Foundation – Horse McDonald
- Unesco City of Music Best Live Event Award – Regular Summer of Nights
- Ticketmaster Tourmaster Award – Texas
- ‘Evolution Award’ Sponsored by Coors Light – Nina Nesbitt
- ‘Music Business Award’ Sponsored by Sunday Mail – Glasgow Jazz Festival
- ‘Best UK Newcomer’ Sponsored by Hampden Cars – Tom Walker
- ‘Best International Artist Award’ Sponsored by Chisholm Hunter – Alice Cooper
- ‘Outstanding Contribution to Music’ Sponsored by SSE – The Waterboys

=== 2013 ===
The winners of the 2013 ceremony were:

- New Boss Award sponsored by DWF Biggart Baillie – Rose Moon
- Special Recognition Award sponsored by People Make Glasgow – Admiral Fallow
- Songwriting Award sponsored by King Tuts – Camera Obscura
- Best Breakthrough Act sponsored by goNorth – Twin Atlantic
- Best Emerging Artist sponsored by Braehead Arena – Nina Nesbitt
- Living Legend Award sponsored by Sunday Mail – John McLaughlin
- Best Live Act sponsored by Ticketmaster – Mogwai
- Fans Choice Award sponsored by Nordoff- Robbins Music Therapy in Scotland – Susan Boyle
- Innovation Award sponsored by Sir Reo Stakis Foundation – Shirley Manson

=== 2011 ===
The winners of the 2011 ceremony were:

- ‘Nordoff-Robbins Special Recognition Award supported by Glasgow City Council’

Karen Mathieson,

- Creative Scotland Big Apple Award’

Song of Return

- Guitar Guitar Musical Instrument Award’

Jim Dunlop, Dunlop Manufacturing Inc

- Silverburn Most Stylish New Artist Award’ Kassidy
- goNORTH Emerging Business Award’

CK Events

- Sir Reo Stakis Foundation Legend Award’

The Rezillos

- Sunday Mail Industry Award’

Richard Park, executive director of Global Radio

- King Tut's Wah Wah Hut Best Live Band Award’ Frightened Rabbit
- Capital FM Breakthrough Artist Award’

Emeli Sandé

- Ticketmaster UK Pride of Scotland Award’ Big Country

== See also ==
- Music of Scotland
