= Somebody Special =

2018 song by Nina Nesbitt

Single by Nina Nesbitt

from the album The Sun Will Come Up, the Seasons Will Change
- Released: 11 January 2018
- Genre: Electropop
- Length: 3:20
- Label: Cooking Vinyl
- Songwriters: Nina Nesbitt; Dan Muckala; Bre Kennedy
- Producer: Dan Muckala

Nina Nesbitt singles chronology
| "The Best You Had" (2017) | "Somebody Special" (2018) | "Loyal to Me" (2018) |

Music video
- "Somebody Special" on YouTube

"Somebody Special" is a song by Scottish singer-songwriter Nina Nesbitt. It was released on 11 January 2018 through Cooking Vinyl as the third single from her second studio album The Sun Will Come Up, the Seasons Will Change.

== Background and release ==
The song was written in Nashville, by Nina Nesbitt with Dan Muckala, who also produced it, and Bre Kennedy. "Somebody Special" was premiered on 8 January 2018 during Zane Lowe's show on Beats 1 and was officially released on 11 January 2018.

"'Somebody Special' is about when you've been feeling a bit low and then you meet this person who changes everything. It's about those first few months where everything you do together feels so exciting."

— Nesbitt on the meaning of the song, via Coup de Main Magazine

An extended play of remixes was released on 8 March 2018 to further promote the song. It includes reworks by electronic artists such as Leon Lour, whose remix was issued as a promotional single on 9 March 2018, and Dutch-Moroccan record producer R3hab, whose remix was released as a promotional single on 30 March 2018.

An acoustic version of "Somebody Special" was included on the deluxe edition, The Sun Will Come Up, the Seasons Will Change & The Flowers Will Fall, was released in November 2019.

== Live performances ==
In 2018, Nesbitt gave two notable acoustic performances of the song: one live backstage at the Scottish music festival TRNSMT, and another at a secret pop-up event hosted by the same festival.

== Music video ==
An official music video was released on 31 January 2018. The script for the "Somebody Special" music video was co-written by Nina Nesbitt.

"I had the idea of putting a twist on the meaning of the song for the video. It’s the story of a girl who is in an emotionally abusive relationship, who doesn’t know her worth because the person she is with treats her like crap. Over time she meets a guy who she gets on the bus with every day who starts to remind her of what her potential is and she starts falling for him."

— Nesbitt explaining the meaning of the music video for "Somebody Special".

== Commercial performance ==
"Somebody Special" peaked at 89 on the UK Singles Chart, and 78 on the Irish Singles Charts. As of December 2025, the track has amassed 52.4 millions of streams on Spotify, alone.

== Track listing ==
- Digital download and streaming – Single
1. "Somebody Special" – 3:20
- Digital download and streaming – Remixes EP
1. "Somebody Special" (R3hab Remix) – 2:34
2. "Somebody Special" (Redfield Remix) – 6:19
3. "Somebody Special" (James Carter Remix) – 2:52
4. "Somebody Special" (Leon Lour Remix) – 6:36
5. "Somebody Special" (Leon Lour Remix - Radio Edit) – 3:50
6. "Somebody Special" (Leon Lour Remix - Instrumental) – 6:37
- Digital download and streaming – Leon Lour Remix
1. "Somebody Special" (Leon Lour Remix) – 6:36
2. "Somebody Special" (Leon Lour Remix - Radio Edit) – 3:50
3. "Somebody Special" (Leon Lour Remix - Instrumental) – 6:37

== Personnel ==
Credits adapted from TIDAL.

- Nina Nesbitt — lead vocalist, composer
- Dan Muckala — producer, composer
- Bre Kennedy — composer

== Charts ==
| Chart (2018) | Peak position |
|---|---|
| Ireland (IRMA) | 78 |
| UK Singles (Official Charts) | 89 |
| UK Indie (Official Charts) | 8 |

== Release history ==
"Somebody Special" release history
| Region | Date | Version | Format(s) | Label | Ref. |
|---|---|---|---|---|---|
| Various | 11 January 2018 | Original | Digital download; streaming | Cooking Vinyl Records | |
| Various | 23 February 2018 | Acoustic Version | Digital download; streaming | Cooking Vinyl Records | |
| Various | 9 March 2018 | Remixes | Digital download; streaming | Cooking Vinyl Records | |
| Various | 9 March 2018 | Leon Lour Remix | Digital download; streaming | Cooking Vinyl Records | |
| Various | 30 March 2018 | R3hab Remix | Digital download; streaming | Cooking Vinyl Records | |
