= Perrie (album) =

Studio album by Perrie
- Released: 26 September 2025
- Genre: Pop
- Length: 49:48
- Label: Columbia
- Producers: Jonathan Bellion; Will Bloomfield; Colin Brittain; Ryan Daly; Andrew Goldstein; Edd Holloway; Tre Jean-Marie; Joy Anonymous; Johnny McDaid; Connor McDonough; Riley McDonough; Mojam; the Nocturns; Kyle Reith; Will Reynolds; RISC; Alfie Russel; Mark "Spike" Stent; Starsmith; Steven Solomon; Tenroc; Ido Zmishlany

Singles from Perrie
- 1. "Forget About Us" Released: 12 April 2024; 2. "You Go Your Way" Released: 4 October 2024; 3. "If He Wanted to He Would" Released: 22 August 2025; 4. "Miss You" Released: 19 September 2025; 5. "Rocket Scientist" Released: 26 September 2025

Perrie is the first solo studio album by the English singer Perrie, released on 26 September 2025 by Columbia Records. For the album, Perrie collaborated with several producers, including Andrew Goldstein, Tre Jean-Marie, the Nocturns, and Ido Zmishlany, among others. Perrie is primarily a pop record, with varied influences from the singer's childhood and multiple eras (Note: Per the album's press release, her childhood influences were described as rock and roll sounds, while eras include Motown, disco and country music genres, and music in the 1980s.) of popular music. To support the album, five singles were released: the UK top ten "Forget About Us", "You Go Your Way", "If He Wanted to He Would", "Miss You" and "Rocket Scientist". In August 2026, it was reported she had departed Columbia after the album's promotional cycle.

Perrie was met with mixed reception among critics; praise was directed towards her vocals and the album's overall production, while criticism deemed it as impersonal and generally safe. Commercially, the album reached number three in Scotland and the United Kingdom, while reaching the top fifty in Ireland, the Netherlands, and Wallonia.

== Background ==
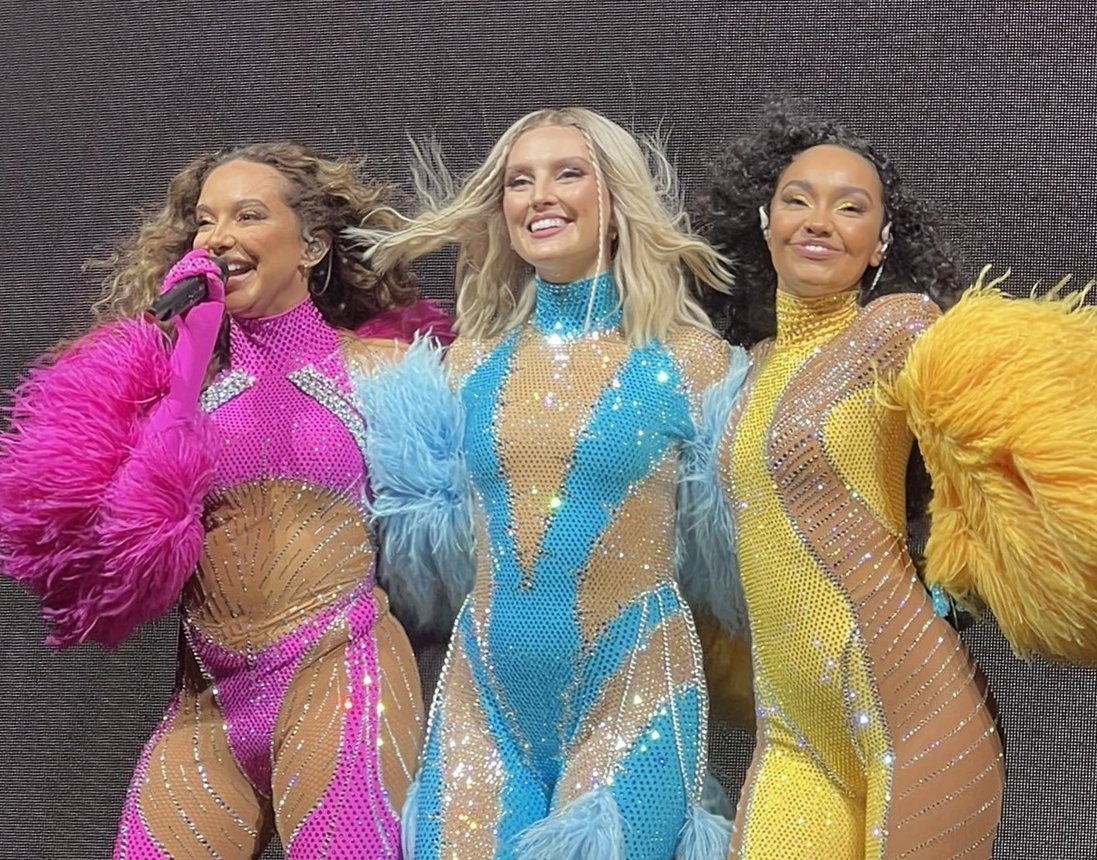
Little Mix performing during the Confetti Tour in 2022

In 2011, Perrie Edwards auditioned for the eighth series of The X Factor. Edwards was eliminated during the Bootcamp stage; however, judges later returned her, along with three other eliminated singers Jesy Nelson, Leigh-Anne Pinnock, and Jade Thirlwall to form a new group, Little Mix (Note: Little Mix were originally formed as Rhythmix; the name was changed following a trademark dispute with the charity of the same name.), which was formed by the judges. The group went on to be named the winners during the finale on 11 December 2011. From 2011 to 2022, they sold over 75 million records worldwide, earned six UK platinum-certified albums, and five UK number one singles. Following the completion of 2022's the Confetti Tour, the group announced they would take a hiatus to pursue solo endeavours.

In March 2023, Daily Mirror reported Edwards was "close to" signing with Sony Music's Columbia Records for her solo career. In an interview with Grazia that same month, she announced she had signed with the label, but that there was no immediate plans to release music as a solo artist.

== Development and recording ==
According to Perrie and the album's press release, Perrie is influenced by the rock and roll sounds of her childhood, the Motown era, disco and country music genres, and music in the 1980s. Kamille, who previously worked with Little Mix, revealed to Official Charts that she was in the studio with Perrie working on solo music, alongside music producer Fred Again and songwriter Steve Mac. By November of the following year, Perrie revealed she was happy with the sessions at that point and had found love with songwriting. Subsequent reports revealed she had been working with Ed Sheeran and Raye.

In early 2024, Perrie began teasing the album on social media; at the same time, she previewed three songs from the album at an exclusive listening party. In an April 2024 interview with NME (as part of their "In Conversation" series), Perrie revealed she had begun exploring songwriting while working on the album. She told the publication she was hesitant to write songs, going as far as to ask Columbia Records to A&R songs for her to avoid confronting the insecurity of writing songs. That June, she revealed on the Zach Sang Show she had written a song talking about a friendship that ended.

In August 2025, Perrie announced majority of the album had been scrapped; she revealed to Rolling Stone UK that the original album intended for release featured songs written for her, while the new album featured songs she had written. That same month, it was announced Perrie would be released on 26 September 2025. On the album's title, Perrie revealed to Capital working titles Golden Hour and The La La Room prior to selecting Perrie.

Describing the process of creating the album as one of liberation, she spoke to Billboard, revealing: "Getting an album out felt very untouchable for quite some time. I'm glad I stuck to my guns and did what I needed to do to make it happen. I'm actually really proud, because I thought I wasn't going to get an album at this point." She cited the process of going solo after performing with Little Mix as starting from scratch. "All I can do is be myself [and] make music that I love, and if that doesn't catch on, it doesn't catch on. I can't be something I'm not. I think I'm just happy that I've stuck to my guns," she told RTÉ.

== Promotion ==
=== Live performances ===
In 2024, Perrie took part in festivals organised by Capital, notably the Summertime Ball in June and the Jingle Bell Ball in December. She further participated at the 2026 edition of Mighty Hoopla on 31 May.

=== Singles ===
"Forget About Us" was released as the album's first single on 12 April 2024. A music video, directed by Jake Nava, was released seven days later. The song entered the UK Singles Chart at number ten, and was certified silver by the British Phonographic Industry. The album's second single, "You Go Your Way", was released on 4 October of the same year. "If He Wanted to He Would" was released as the album's third single on 22 August 2025. "Miss You" was released on 19 September 2025, as the album's fourth single. The fifth single, "Rocket Scientist", was released on 26 September 2025, alongside the album's release.

Perrie includes "Tears", which was released as a standalone single on 21 June 2024 and later included on the fan edition of the album. The fan edition also included the singles "Me, Myself & You" and "Rollercoaster", which were released on 8 November 2024 and 14 February 2025, respectively.

"Cute Aggression" was released on 7 September 2025 as the only promotional single from the album. In February 2026, "Woman in Love" from the fan edition was placed on music streaming services. In May of the same year, Perrie released a new recording of "Passenger Princess", following the birth of her daughter. It was later included on the release of the album's fan edition on music download and streaming services.

== Critical reception ==
Professional ratings
Review scores
Source	Rating
Clash	8/10
The Independent	4/5 stars

Perrie received mixed reception from music critics. In a review for The Independent, Roisin O’Connor complimented that the album made the most of Perrie's voice, while noting several song comparisons to that of Don Henley and Alanis Morissette. She noted, however, that while it was a fantastic pop record, there was some sense of industry-learnt self-consciousness" that kept it from fully leaning into a sense of self for Perrie. Clash's Robin Murray heralded the album as a "triumphant debut", however, noted that some songs lacked some definition ("Absofuckinglutely") and felt there may be one "ballad too many" included.

Reagan Denning for Melodic Magazine described Perrie as "undeniable talent" with the album, and complimented her vocals. Denning further compared Perrie to the likes of Adele, Sabrina Carpenter, Tate McRae, and Mimi Webb. Rolling Stone UK listed the album as one of their nine albums to be heard for the week of 26 September 2025.

== Accolades ==
Accolades
Year	Organization	Category	Result	Ref.
2026	iHeartRadio Music Awards	Favorite Debut Album	Nominated	

== Commercial performance ==
Perrie debuted at number three on the UK Albums Chart, selling 15,243 album equivalent units in its first week. Elsewhere, the album entered at number three on the Scottish Albums Chart, and the top forty on both the Irish Albums Chart and the Dutch Album Top 100 chart.

== Track listing ==
Standard track listing
No.	Title	Writer(s)	Producer(s)	Length
1.	"Forget About Us"	Perrie Louise Edwards; Ed Sheeran; David Hodges; Steven Solomon	Andrew Goldstein; Solomon	3:06
2.	"If He Wanted to He Would"	Edwards; Charlie Martin; Nina Nesbitt; Joe Housley	Solomon; the Nocturns	3:17
3.	"Sand Dancer"	Edwards; Martin; Ed Drewett; Nesbitt; Housley	The Nocturns	2:44
4.	"Rocket Scientist"	Jonathan Bellion; Colin Brittain; Feli Ferraro; Jason Cornet; Elijah Noll	Bellion; Brittain; Tenroc; Kyle Reith	3:27
5.	"Baby Steps"	Edwards; Will Bloomfield; Grace Barker; Sophia Brennan	Bloomfield	2:47
6.	"Bonnie and Clyde"	Edwards; Mustafa Omar; James Murray; Maegan Cottone; Tom Mann	Mojam	2:47
7.	"Pushing Up Daisies"	Sheeran; Johnny McDaid; Will Reynolds	McDaid; Reynolds; Mark "Spike" Stent	3:25
8.	"Cute Aggression"	Edwards; Martin; Drewitt; Housley; Brennan	The Nocturns	2:36
9.	"Miss You"	Edwards; Jean-Marie; Uzoechi Emenike	Jean-Marie	3:40
10.	"Punchline"	Edwards; Jean-Marie; Nesbitt; Cottone	Goldstein; Jean-Marie	2:50
11.	"Put You First"	Edwards; Philip Plested; Christopher Smith	RISC	2:38
12.	"Absofuckinglutely"	Edwards; Martin; Housley	The Nocturns	3:23
13.	"Where You Are"	Edwards; Nesbitt; Edd Holloway	Holloway	2:36
14.	"Same Place Different View"	Edwards; Connor McDonough; Riley McDonough; Toby McDonough; Ryan Patrick Daly	C. McDonough; R. McDonough; Daly	3:46
15.	"You Go Your Way"	Edwards; Alfie Russel; Henry Counsell	Russel; Joy Anonymous	3:55
16.	"Goodbye My Friend"	Ido Zmishlany; Ferraro; Plested; Edwards	Zmishlany	2:43
Total length:				49:48

Fan edition bonus tracks
No.	Title	Writer(s)	Producer(s)	Length
17.	"Tears"	Zmishlany; Ferraro	Zmishlany	2:55
18.	"Rollercoaster"	Edwards; Tom Mann; Jin Jin; Finlay Dow-Smith	Starsmith	3:06
19.	"Woman in Love"	Edwards; Zmishlany; Ferraro	Zmishlany	2:43
20.	"2-2"	Edwards; Benjy Gibson; Itamar Lapidot; Rachel Keen; Jin Jin	Gibson; Lapidot	3:01
21.	"Passenger Princess" (demo)	Edwards; Housley; Martin; Nesbitt	Holloway
22.	"Heartbeat"	Edwards; Jordan Riley; Iain James	Riley; "Spike" Stent	3:06
23.	"Me, Myself & You"	Edwards; Jean-Marie; Jonny Lattimer; Nesbitt; Aquilina Lauren Amber	Jean-Marie	2:35

=== Notes ===
- On physical releases, "Pushing Up Daisies" is omitted as the seventh track, with all subsequent entries remaining in original listing order.
- On the Record Store Day vinyl LP release of the fan edition, the first side includes "Forget About Us", "You Go Your Way", "If He Wanted to He Would", "Tears", and "Rollercoaster". The second side features the remaining bonus tracks, presented in their original track listing order.
- On 28 August 2026, the fan edition was released on music download and streaming services. This release substituted the demo mix of "Passenger Princess" with the new recording, which had been released in May of the same year.

== Personnel ==
The credits are adapted from Tidal.

=== Musicians ===
- Perrie – vocals (all tracks), background vocals (tracks 7, 13, 15)
- Steven Solomon – guitar (1, 2), programming (1); bass guitar, keyboards (2)
- Tre Jean-Marie – programming (1, 15); bass, piano, programming (9)
- Andrew Goldstein – guitar, keyboards, programming (1, 10)
- Bas van Daalen – guitar, keyboards (1)
- David Hodges – piano (1)
- Wez Clarke – programming (1)
- Charlie Martin – drums, keyboards, programming, synthesizer (2, 3, 8, 12)
- Joe Housley – background vocals, guitar (2, 3, 8, 12)
- Dan Grech-Marguerat – programming (3, 8)
- Colin Brittain – acoustic guitar, background vocals, bass guitar, cello, drums, electric guitar, synthesizer (4)
- TenRoc – bass guitar (4)
- Kyle Reith – synthesizer (4)
- Will Bloomfield – bass guitar, keyboards, electric guitar, keyboards, percussion, programming (5)
- James Murray – bass guitar, drums, keyboards, percussion, programming (6)
- Mustafa Omer – bass guitar, drums, keyboards, percussion, programming (6)
- Ben Harrison – guitar (6)
- Andrew Murray – strings (6)
- Will Reynolds – acoustic guitar, bass guitar, electric guitar, keyboards, programming (7)
- Johnny McDaid – bass guitar, keyboards, programming (7)
- Ash Soan – drums (7)
- Wired Strings – strings (9)
  - Rosie Danvers – arrangement, cello
  - Emma Owens – viola
  - Hayley Pomfrett – violin
  - Jenny Sacha – violin
  - Patrick Kiernan – violin
  - Sarah Sexton – violin
  - Steve Morris – violin
  - Zahra Benyounes – violin
- Risc – acoustic guitar, electric guitar, programming (11)
- Nina Nesbitt – background vocals, electric guitar (13)
- Edd Holloway – bass guitar, electric guitar, piano, programming, synthesizer (13)
- Connor McDonough – bass guitar, organ, piano, programming (14)
- Riley McDonough – bass guitar, organ, piano, programming (14)
- Toby McDonough – bass guitar, organ, piano, programming (14)
- Alfie Russel – background vocals, bass, drums, guitar, keyboards, percussion (15)
- Henry Counsell – background vocal, drums, guitar, keyboards, percussion (15)
- Conal Kelly – bass guitar (15)
- Hudson Mohawke – drums, percussion (15)
- Ido Zmishlany – bass, drums, guitar, keyboards, programming, synthesizer (16)

=== Technical ===
- Mark "Spike" Stent – mixing (1, 2, 4, 5, 7, 9, 11, 14, 16)
- Dan Grech-Marguerat – mixing (3, 8)
- Geoff Swan – mixing (6)
- Charlie Holmes – mixing (10, 12, 13)
- Josh Gudwin – mixing (15)
- Randy Merrill – mastering (1, 2)
- Stuart Hawkes – mastering (3, 6, 8–14, 16)
- Chris Gehringer – mastering (15)
- Will Bloomfield – engineering (5)
- Tre Jean-Marie – engineering (6), vocal engineering (14)
- Graham Archer – engineering (7)
- Johnny McDaid – engineering (7)
- Will Reynolds – engineering (7)
- The Nocturns – engineering (8, 12)
- Edd Holloway – engineering (13)
- Connor McDonough – engineering (14)
- Riley McDonough – engineering (14)
- Toby McDonough – engineering (14)
- Matt Wolach – mixing assistance (1, 2, 4, 5, 7, 9, 11, 14, 16)
- Kieran Beardmore – mixing assistance (1, 2, 4, 5, 7, 9, 11, 16)
- Matt Cahill – mixing assistance (6)
- Luke Burgoyne – mixing assistance (8)
- Seb Maletka-Catala – mixing assistance (8)
- Matt J. Barnes – mixing assistance (10, 12, 13)
- Ryan Daly – mixing assistance (14)

== Charts ==
Chart performance
Chart (2025)	Peak position
Australian Albums (ARIA)	51
Belgian Albums (Ultratop Wallonia)	49
Dutch Albums (Album Top 100)	40
Irish Albums (Official Charts)	37
French Albums (SNEP)	172
Portuguese Albums (AFP)	180
Scottish Albums (Official Charts)	3
UK Albums (Official Charts)	3

== Sales ==
Sales
Region	Certification	Certified units/sales
United Kingdom	—	24,499
