= Loyal to Me =

2018 song by Nina Nesbitt

Single by Nina Nesbitt

from the album The Sun Will Come Up, the Seasons Will Change
- Released: 10 August 2018
- Genre: Pop R&B
- Length: 3:13
- Label: Cooking Vinyl
- Songwriters: Nina Nesbitt; Michael Gormley; Kyle “Logik” Burns; Edward Conor James Butler
- Producer: Fraser T. Smith

Nina Nesbitt singles chronology
"Somebody Special" (2018)	"Loyal to Me" (2018)	"Colder" (2018)

"Loyal to Me" is a song by the Scottish singer-songwriter Nina Nesbitt. It was released on 10 August 2018 through Cooking Vinyl as the fourth single from her second studio album The Sun Will Come Up, the Seasons Will Change. The song was written by Nesbitt with Michael Gormley and Edward Conor James Butler, and was produced by Fraser T. Smith.

== Background ==
Nina Nesbitt reportedly started to work on "Loyal to Me" in London when she was writing songs for other artists. It was intended for a girl group like Little Mix. After she wrote half of the song, Nesbitt played it for two collaborators who convinced her to finish it and sing it herself. Five different producers worked on the song before Fraser T. Smith.

In October 2018, Nina Nesbitt unveiled the tracklist for her second studio album The Sun Will Come Up, the Seasons Will Change which includes Loyal to Me. The album was released on 1 February 2019.

== Composition ==
"Loyal to Me" is a pop song influenced by R&B ballads from the 1990s and early 2000s. Nina Nesbitt explained that she was inspired by Destiny's Child and TLC when she wrote this song.

About the topic of the song, Nina Nesbitt said that she "wrote this as a bit of advice for one of [her] best friends". She explained to British magazine Clash that she sees it as "a list of symptoms you need to look out for when you fear you may be dating someone who doesn’t have the best intentions".

== Promotion and reception ==
Following the release of "Loyal to Me", Nesbitt was featured on the cover of the "New Music Friday UK" playlist on Spotify. The song was promoted through billboard ads posted in Times Square by Spotify and Apple Music. It was the first time that both streaming platforms advertised the same artist in the same location.

On iTunes, "Loyal to Me" peaked at 88 in the United Kingdom and at 97 in Brazil. According to The Daily Shuffle, this song has become a fan-favourite during Nesbitt's shows.

== Music video ==
The music video for "Loyal to Me", directed by Debbie Scanlan, was published on 21 August 2018. It was premiered by American fashion magazine V. It was compared to the music videos for Beyoncé's "Single Ladies (Put a Ring on It)", Britney Spears's "Stronger" and Dua Lipa's "New Rules".

Nesbitt worked with Scanlan on the aesthetics of her second studio album. For each music videos, the singer wanted to set a challenge for herself. For their first collaboration on "Loyal to Me", Nesbitt and Scanlan chose ballet, which the singer had never done before. She danced alongside two back-up dancers with whom she executed a hiplet routine. She performed most of the choreography en pointe.

Billboard named "Loyal to Me" the 43rd best music video of 2018.

== Other versions ==
Nesbitt recorded an acoustic version of the song at the Rolling Stone headquarters. It was published on the magazine's website on 23 August 2018.

A remix by German DJ Luca Schreiner was released in September 2018. This version features deep house grooves and was inspired by tropical house.

In November 2019, Nesbitt published The Sun Will Come Up, the Seasons Will Change & The Flowers Will Fall, the deluxe edition of her second studio album. An acoustic version of every song from the original album was added to the deluxe edition, including "Loyal to Me".

== Charts ==
Chart (2018)	Peak position
Belgium (Ultratip Bubbling Under Flanders)	36
Scottish Singles Sales (Official Charts)	84
UK Indie (Official Charts)	25
