= The Sun Will Come Up, the Seasons Will Change =

Studio album by Nina Nesbitt
- Released: 1 February 2019
- Genres: Pop; R&B
- Length: 46:00
- Label: Cooking Vinyl
- Producers: Lostboy; Dan Muckala; Nina Nesbitt; Rick Parkhouse; Jordan Riley; Fraser T. Smith; George Tizzard

Nina Nesbitt chronology
Life in Colour (2016)	The Sun Will Come Up, the Seasons Will Change (2019)	Älskar (2022)

Singles from The Sun Will Come Up, the Seasons Will Change
- 1. "The Moments I'm Missing" Released: 14 July 2017; 2. "The Best You Had" Released: 8 September 2017; 3. "Somebody Special" Released: 11 January 2018; 4. "Loyal to Me" Released: 10 August 2018; 5. "Colder" Released: 30 November 2018; 6. "Is It Really Me You're Missing" Released: 1 February 2019; 7. "Love Letter" Released: 19 April 2019; 8. "Last December" Released: 6 December 2019

Singles from The Sun Will Come Up, the Seasons Will Change & The Flowers Will Fall
- 1. "Black & Blue" Released: 13 September 2019; 2. "Toxic" Released: 25 October 2019

The Sun Will Come Up, the Seasons Will Change is the second studio album by Scottish singer-songwriter Nina Nesbitt, released on 1 February 2019 through Cooking Vinyl. The standard edition of the album was supported by eight singles. "The Moments I'm Missing" was released as the lead single in July 2017 quickly followed by "The Best You Had", "Somebody Special", "Loyal to Me", "Colder", "Is It Really Me You're Missing", "Love Letter" and "Last December". The deluxe extension featured two new singles, "Black & Blue" and "Toxic". Nesbitt embarked on a headline tour of North America and the United Kingdom from February to April 2019 in support of the album, which visited 26 venues.

== Background ==
The album had been worked on by Nesbitt for three years and is more pop-focused than her previous material. Nesbitt stated that it is "the album I always wanted to make on my own terms. It's an honest account of somebody in their early '20s, giving a real window into their often ever changing life."

== Music ==
"The Best You Had" has been called "R&B-tinged" and an "unusually honest breakup track", while "The Moments I'm Missing", produced in Nesbitt's bedroom, was called "multi-layered" with a story behind it. "Somebody Special" was noted as a "love song with a twist" and a "self-love anthem", and "Is It Really Me You're Missing?" was originally intended for Rihanna.

== Track listing ==
No.	Title	Writer(s)	Producer(s)	Length
1.	"Sacred"	Nina Nesbitt	Jordan Riley	2:37
2.	"The Moments I'm Missing"	Nesbitt	Nesbitt; Riley	3:46
3.	"The Best You Had"	Nesbitt; Riley	Riley	2:56
4.	"Colder"	Nesbitt; Thomas Slinger	Fraser T. Smith	3:08
5.	"Loyal to Me"	Nesbitt; Edward Conor; Mikey Gormley	Smith	3:13
6.	"Somebody Special"	Nesbitt; Dan Muckala; Brianna Kennedy	Muckala	3:20
7.	"Is It Really Me You're Missing?"	Nesbitt; Sam Preston; Rick Parkhouse; George Tizzard	Parkhouse; Tizzard	3:52
8.	"Love Letter"	Nesbitt; Smith; Janée Bennett	Smith	3:34
9.	"Empire"	Nesbitt	Lostboy	3:34
10.	"Chloe"	Nesbitt; Peter Rycroft	Lostboy	3:54
11.	"Things I Say When You Sleep"	Nesbitt	Lostboy	3:36
12.	"Last December"	Nesbitt	Lostboy	4:55
13.	"The Sun Will Come Up, the Seasons Will Change"	Nesbitt	Lostboy	3:35
Total length:				46:00

The Sun Will Come Up, the Seasons Will Change & the Flowers Will Fall
No.	Title	Writer(s)	Producer(s)	Length
14.	"Black & Blue"	Nesbitt; Rick Markowitz; Micah Premnath	Markowitz	3:11
15.	"Ungrateful"	Nesbitt; Alex Smith; Paul Barry	Riley	2:42
16.	"Toxic"	Henrik Jonback; Christian Karlsson; Pontus Winnberg; Cathy Dennis	Riley	3:59
17.	"Still Waiting to Start"	Nesbitt; Leroy Clampitt	Clampitt	3:04
18.	"Sacred" (acoustic version)	Nesbitt	Riley	2:23
19.	"The Moments I'm Missing" (stripped version)	Nesbitt	Nesbitt; Riley	4:18
20.	"The Best You Had" (acoustic version)	Nesbitt; Riley	Riley	3:19
21.	"Colder" (acoustic version)	Nesbitt; Slinger	Riley	3:25
22.	"Loyal to Me" (acoustic version)	Nesbitt; Gormley; Conor	Smith	3:12
23.	"Somebody Special" (acoustic version)	Nesbitt; Muckala; Kennedy	Muckala	3:39
24.	"Is It Really Me You're Missing" (acoustic version)	Nesbitt; Preston; Tizzard; Parkhouse	Riley	3:53
25.	"Love Letter" (acoustic version)	Nesbitt; Smith; Bennett	Riley	3:36
26.	"Empire" (acoustic version)	Nesbitt	Riley	3:10
27.	"Chloe" (acoustic version)	Nesbitt; Rycroft	Riley	3:27
28.	"Things I Say When You Sleep" (acoustic version)	Nesbitt	Riley	3:12
29.	"Last December" (acoustic version)	Nesbitt	Riley	4:32
30.	"The Sun Will Come Up, the Seasons Will Change" (acoustic version)	Nesbitt	Riley	2:27

== Personnel ==
- Nina Nesbitt – lead vocals
- John Davis – mastering
- Dean Barratt – mixing (tracks 1, 3, 9–11, 13)
- Jordan Riley – mixing (track 2)
- Manon Grandjean – mixing (tracks 4, 8)
- Fraser T. Smith – mixing (track 5)
- Dan Muckala – mixing (track 6)
- Rick Parkhouse – mixing (track 7)
- George Tizzard – mixing (track 7)
- Peter Rycroft – mixing (track 12)
- Wolf James – photography
- Luke Insect Studio – design

== Charts ==
Chart (2019)	Peak position
Irish Albums (IRMA)	43
Scottish Albums (Official Charts)	5
UK Albums (Official Charts)	21
