= Mountain Music (Nina Nesbitt album) =

Studio album by Nina Nesbitt
- Released: 27 September 2024
- Genre: Folk-pop
- Length: 40:50
- Label: Apple Tree
- Producer: Peter Miles; Nina Nesbitt

Nina Nesbitt chronology
Älskar (2022)	Mountain Music (2024)

Singles from Mountain Music
- 1. "Pages / On the Run" Released: 8 March 2024; 2. "Mansion" Released: 18 April 2024; 3. "I'm Coming Home" Released: 14 June 2024; 4. "Anger" Released: 9 August 2024; 5. "Enough" Released: January 22, 2025

Mountain Music is the fourth studio album by Scottish singer and songwriter Nina Nesbitt. It was released on 27 September 2024 via her own label, Apple Tree Records, and serves as her first independent release under her record label. It follows her 2022 album Älskar.

== Singles ==
Mountain Music was preceded by the release of five singles: "Pages", "On the Run", "Mansion", "I'm Coming Home" and "Anger".

== Track listing ==
All tracks are written by Nina Nesbitt. "Anger" written with Ollie Green; "Parachute" written with Patrick J. Pearson.

Mountain Music track listing
No.	Title	Length
1.	"Pages"	3:13
2.	"I'm Coming Home"	4:02
3.	"Mansion"	3:36
4.	"On the Run"	4:13
5.	"Painkiller"	4:08
6.	"Anger"	2:57
7.	"Alchemise"	2:01
8.	"Big Things, Small Town"	3:09
9.	"Treachery"	4:23
10.	"Hard Times"	2:53
11.	"What Will Make Me Great"	2:05
12.	"Parachute"	4:10
Total length:		40:50

Mountain Music (The Summit) track listing
No.	Title	Length
1.	"Enough"	2:52
2.	"The Mountain & the Man"	4:50
3.	"Crooked Teeth"	4:20
4.	"Good Years"	5:34
Total length:		58:26

== Personnel ==
- Nina Nesbitt – vocals, production (all tracks); percussion (tracks 3, 6, 12), synthesizer (6), piano (7), acoustic guitar (11)
- Peter Miles – production, mixing, mastering (all tracks); electric guitars (tracks 1–3, 6, 12), percussion (1–3, 6, 12), acoustic guitars (2, 6), backing vocals (6, 10)
- Aaron Graham – sound design (tracks 1–9), drums (1–4, 6, 8–10, 12), percussion (1–4, 6, 8, 9, 12), backing vocals (2, 3, 6, 10)
- Linus Fenton – electric bass (tracks 1–3, 6, 8, 9, 12), backing vocals (2, 6, 8), upright bass (3–5, 10)
- Patrick J. Pearson – piano (tracks 1–6, 8–10, 12), Hammond organ (1, 2), backing vocals (2)
- Joe Wilkins – electric guitars (tracks 1, 3, 5, 6, 8, 9), baritone guitars (4)
- Tommy Ashby – acoustic guitars (tracks 1–4, 6, 8–10, 12), electric guitars (1–4, 6, 8, 12), backing vocals (2, 3, 6, 8, 10); mandolin, percussion (3)
- Soren Bryce – engineering assistance (tracks 1–4, 6, 8–10, 12), backing vocals (2, 3, 6, 8)
- Will Harvey – violin (tracks 3, 12)
- Wolf James – photography

== Charts ==
Chart performance for Mountain Music
Chart (2024)	Peak position
Scottish Albums (OCC)	3
UK Albums (OCC)	46
