= The Best You Had =

Single by Nina Nesbitt

from the album The Sun Will Come Up, the Seasons Will Change
- Released: September 8, 2017
- Genre: R&B
- Length: 2:55
- Label: Cooking Vinyl
- Songwriters: Nina Nesbitt; Jordan Riley
- Producer: Jordan Riley

Nina Nesbitt singles chronology
"The Moments I'm Missing" (2017)	"The Best You Had" (2017)	"Somebody Special" (2018)

Music video
- "The Best You Had" on YouTube

"The Best You Had" is a song by Scottish singer-songwriter Nina Nesbitt. It was released on 8 September 2017 through Cooking Vinyl as the second single from her second studio album The Sun Will Come Up, the Seasons Will Change.

== Background and release ==
The song was written by Nesbitt and Jordan Riley, who also produced it. In an interview with Galore magazine, Nesbitt stated that she was inspired by a friend's reaction after seeing her ex-boyfriend appear with someone new on social media.

"The Best You Had" is a song that portrays the complicated feelings you have about an ex moving on. The fear that the new person is better than you. Smarter. Prettier. That they could possibly love them more than they loved you.

— Nesbitt explaining the meaning of the song, via The AU Review

The song was officially released on 8 September 2017 to positive reviews. It received praise from American singer-songwriter Taylor Swift, who included it on her "favourite tracks" playlist on streaming services. In 2020, American singer-songwriter Justin Jesso listed the song among his top underappreciated tracks in an interview with Wonderland magazine, stating: "I fell in love with this song the first time I heard it. It’s a banger."

== Promotion ==
On 8 March 2018, Nesbitt released two remixes of the track, produced by electronic musicians Ashworth and DJ Fresh, to further promote the single. She later promoted the song by making her U.S. late-night television debut on The Late Show with Stephen Colbert on 4 April 2019.

== Music video ==
An official music video was released on 18 September 2017 and was directed by Alexander Darby. It features Nesbitt and Scottish actor Callum Kerr as a former couple. Kerr portrays her ex-boyfriend, who experiences flashbacks of their past relationship with Nesbitt while being intimate with his new partner, played by Katrina Durden, which unsettles him.

== Track listing ==
- Digital download and streaming – Single
1. "The Best You Had" – 2:55
- Digital download and streaming – Remixes
1. "The Best You Had" (Ashworth Remix) – 2:58
2. "The Best You Had" (DJ Fresh Remix) – 2:53

== Personnel ==
Credits adapted from TIDAL.

- Nina Nesbitt — lead vocalist, composer
- Jordan Riley — producer, composer

== Certifications ==
Region	Certification	Certified units/sales
United Kingdom (BPI)	Silver	200,000^{‡}
^{‡} Sales+streaming figures based on certification alone.

== Release history ==
"The Best You Had" release history
Region	Date	Version	Format(s)	Label	Ref.
Various	8 September 2017	Original	Digital download; streaming	Cooking Vinyl Records	
Various	8 March 2018	Remixes	Digital download; streaming	Cooking Vinyl Records	
