= Peroxide (Nina Nesbitt album) =

Studio album by Nina Nesbitt
- Released: 17 February 2014
- Genres: Folk pop; indie rock
- Length: 45:29
- Label: Island
- Producers: Iain Archer; James Earp; Matt Furmidge; Jake Gosling; Steve Mac; James F. Reynolds; Alex Smith

Nina Nesbitt chronology
Nina Nesbitt (2014)	Peroxide (2014)	Modern Love (2016)

Singles from Peroxide
- 1. "The Apple Tree" Released: 23 April 2012; 2. "Stay Out" Released: 8 April 2013; 3. "Don’t Stop" Released: 23 August 2013; 4. "Selfies" Released: 9 February 2014

Professional ratings
Aggregate scores
Source	Rating
Metacritic	56/100
Review scores
Source	Rating
AllMusic	3.5/5 stars
The Daily Telegraph	4/5 stars
Drowned in Sound	(3/10)
Financial Times	2/5 stars
The Guardian	3/5 stars
The Independent	3/5 stars
The Irish Times	3/5 stars
NME	(3/10)
The Observer	2/5 stars
Virgin Media	3/5 stars

Peroxide is the debut studio album by the Scottish singer-songwriter Nina Nesbitt. The album features new material and old songs from her past extended plays (EPs). It was released on 17 February 2014. After the release of the album, Nesbitt embarked on a 3-show tour including Manchester, London, and her hometown of Edinburgh. The album was produced by Nesbitt with Jake Gosling and Iain Archer.

Despite being at number one on Wednesday's mid-week chart, with a small lead, following the Brit Awards that night giving coverage to other bands and singers, including Arctic Monkeys and Bastille, it only reached number 11 on the album chart on Sunday, 23 February. However, in Nesbitt's native Scotland, the album entered at number one on the Scottish Albums Chart, selling 45% more than its nearest competitor.

== Track listing ==
No.	Title	Writer(s)	Producer(s)	Length
1.	"Peroxide"	Nina Nesbitt	Jake Gosling	3:31
2.	"Stay Out"	Nesbitt; Iain Archer	Gosling; Archer	2:43
3.	"Selfies"	Nesbitt; Thomas Kirkpatrick	James Earp	3:26
4.	"Two Worlds Away"	Nesbitt	Gosling	3:25
5.	"Align"	Nesbitt; Gosling; Chris Leonard	Gosling	3:58
6.	"Mr. C"	Nesbitt; Steve McCutcheon; Lily Allen; Karen Poole	Steve Mac	2:42
7.	"He's the One I'm Bringing Back"	Nesbitt; Nick Hodgson	Gosling	3:01
8.	"18 Candles"	Nesbitt; Gosling; Leonard	Gosling; Matt Furmidge; Alex Smith	3:13
9.	"Tough Luck"	Nesbitt; Gosling	Gosling	3:18
10.	"The Outcome"	Nesbitt; Archer	Gosling	3:22
11.	"Hold You" (featuring Kodaline)	Nesbitt	Earp	5:28
12.	"We'll Be Back for More"	Nesbitt; Rune Westberg	Gosling; Archer	3:20
13.	"The Hardest Part"	Nesbitt	Earp	4:02
Total length:				45:29

Deluxe edition (bonus tracks)
No.	Title	Writer(s)	Producer(s)	Length
14.	"Some You Win"	Nesbitt; Gosling; Leonard	Gosling	3:34
15.	"Bright Blue Eyes"	Nesbitt	Earp	4:09
16.	"Brit Summer"	Nesbitt; Archer	Archer	3:09
17.	"Don't Stop"	Christine McVie	Earp; James F. Reynolds	2:46
18.	"Not What Your Dad Wants to Know"	Nesbitt	Earp	2:59
19.	"The Apple Tree"	Nesbitt; Gosling; Leonard	Gosling	2:51
20.	"The People"	Nesbitt	Gosling	5:27
Total length:				70:24

== Charts ==
Chart (2014)	Peak position
Irish Albums (IRMA)	40
Scottish Albums (Official Charts)	1
UK Albums (Official Charts)	11

== Release history ==
Region	Date	Edition	Format	Label
Australia	14 February 2014	Standard; deluxe	Digital download	Island
New Zealand	14 February 2014	Standard; deluxe	Digital download	Island
Ireland	14 February 2014	Standard; deluxe	Digital download, CD	Island
United Kingdom	17 February 2014	Standard; deluxe	Digital download, CD	Island
Japan	19 February 2014	Standard; deluxe	Digital download	Island
