= Forget About Us =

Single by Perrie

from the album Perrie
- Released: 12 April 2024
- Genre: Pop
- Length: 3:06
- Label: Columbia
- Composers: David Hodges; Steven Solomon
- Lyricists: Ed Sheeran; Perrie Edwards
- Producers: Solomon; Andrew Goldstein

Perrie singles chronology
"Forget About Us" (2024)	"Tears" (2024)

Music video
- "Forget About Us" on YouTube

"Forget About Us" is the first solo single by English singer Perrie. It was released on 12 April 2024, through Columbia Records as the lead single from Perrie's debut solo studio album, Perrie (2025). It is her first solo endeavour after Little Mix began their hiatus in 2022. Originally written by Ed Sheeran, a demo version of the track was sent to Perrie where she recorded a new version of it at her in home studio in London. Co-written and produced by notable names including David Hodges formerly of rock band Evanescence, the lyrics and concept was changed to fit her perspective of past relationships.

Critics described "Forget About Us" as a pop ballad with influences of country music. It received positive reviews, with some praising her vocal range. The song debuted at number ten on the UK Singles Chart, and is featured on her debut album, Perrie.

== Background ==
In March 2024, Perrie announced the start of her solo career, unveiling the title of her first single, writing: "Here's the truth of it....." Wow. It's happening!! My first solo single 'Forget About Us' is coming." The same month, fans and critics were invited to some listening parties across London, where she revealed further details about her upcoming debut album. In an interview with NME, Perrie revealed that Ed Sheeran originally sent her a demo for 'Forget About Us" and she later changed the concept and lyrics of the song to fit her style.

== Composition and lyrics ==
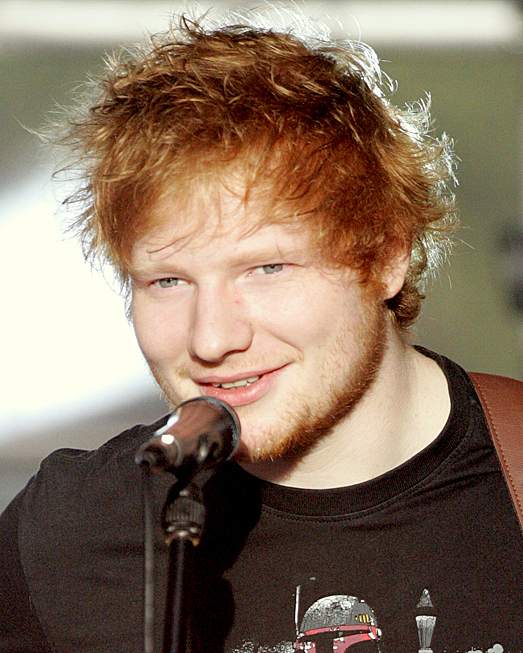
The song was co-written by English singer-songwriter Ed Sheeran.

"Forget About Us" was recorded at Perrie's home studio in London, after she was sent a demo version of the track by Ed Sheeran. Prior to its release date it had been described by NME as a "sun-dappled stomper with a powerhouse vocal, while Billboard further described the single as "having Katy Perry and Kelly Clarkson vibes". It is a pop ballad single with influences of country music and lyrics addressing past relationships and friendships written from Perrie's perspective. Critics and reviews speculated over who the lyrics referred to, including ex-fiancé Zayn Malik.

== Reception ==
Lars Brandle from Billboard magazine described it as "a polished pop ballad with country sensibilities". Holly Allton with The Shields Gazette named it as "song of the summer" and hailed it as "the perfect pop debut" with some country influences. They also added how the song showcases her vocal ability and her range with lower notes before finishing with a high note. Writing for Attitude, Alastair James gave praise to Perrie's vocal ability and described it as a "pop tune, perfect for the summer", with lyrics which offers a mature take on relationships.

== Promotion and live performances ==
Perrie embarked on a promotional tour for the single attending fan events and radio stations in France, the UK, and Amsterdam where she also spoke about her upcoming debut album. "Forget About Us" received its first live performance in London during one of her fan events.

Furthermore she appeared on The Jonathan Ross Show, where an exclusive clip of her music video was teased. On 16 June 2024, she performed the song at Capital FM's Summertime Ball. On 7 December 2024, she performed the track at the Capital FM's Jingle Bell Ball.

== Music video ==
The music video was first teased after Perrie guest appearance on The Jonathan Ross Show, where an exclusive clip of her music video was aired on 13 April 2024. The official music video of the song was released on 19 April 2024. It was filmed in Cape Town, South Africa by British director Jake Nava.

== Commercial performance ==
"Forget About Us" debuted at number one on the Official Charts Company Trending Charts. It topped the UK Singles Downloads Chart, and peaked at number two on the UK Singles Sales Chart. The single debuted at number ten on the UK Singles Chart, and also entered the top thirty of the Irish Singles Chart.

== Track listings and formats ==
7-inch vinyl, cassette and CD single

1. "Forget About Us" – 3:06
2. "Forget About Us" (extended) – 4:49
3. "Forget About Us" (acapella) – 3:03

Streaming/digital download

1. "Forget About Us" – 3:06
2. "Forget About Us" (instrumental) – 3:06
3. "Forget About Us" (acapella) – 3:03

Streaming/digital download – acoustic

1. "Forget About Us" (acoustic) – 3:03
2. "Forget About Us" (acoustic acapella) – 3:05

Streaming/digital download – extended

1. "Forget About Us" (extended) – 4:49

Streaming/digital download – extended instrumental

1. "Forget About Us" (extended instrumental) – 4:48

Streaming/digital download – live

1. "Forget About Us" (live) – 3:20

== Charts ==
=== Weekly charts ===
Weekly Chart performance for "Forget About Us"
Chart (2024–2025)	Peak position
Belarus Airplay (TopHit)	185
Croatia International Airplay (Top lista)	38
Estonia Airplay (TopHit)	34
Ireland (IRMA)	22
Lithuania Airplay (TopHit)	64
New Zealand Hot Singles (RMNZ)	16
Sweden Heatseeker (Sverigetopplistan)	11
UK Singles (Official Charts)	10

=== Monthly charts ===
Monthly chart performance for "Forget About Us"
Chart (2024)	Peak position
Estonia Airplay (TopHit)	69
Lithuania Airplay (TopHit)	97

=== Year-end charts ===
Year-end chart performance for "Forget About Us"
Chart (2024)	Position
Estonia Airplay (TopHit)	105

== Certifications ==
Certifications for "Forget About Us"
Region	Certification	Certified units/sales
United Kingdom (BPI)	Silver	200,000^{‡}
^{‡} Sales+streaming figures based on certification alone.

== Release history ==
"Forget About Us" release history
Region	Date	Version	Format(s)	Label(s)	Ref.
Various	12 April 2024	original; extended; acapella; instrumental	7-inch vinyl; cassette; CD; digital download; streaming	Columbia	
Various	19 April 2024	extended	Digital download; streaming	Columbia	
Various	26 April 2024	extended instrumental	Digital download; streaming	Columbia	
Various	26 April 2024	live	Digital download; streaming	Columbia	
Various	17 May 2024	acoustic; acoustic acapella	Digital download; streaming	Columbia	
