= Älskar =

Studio album by Nina Nesbitt
- Released: 2 September 2022
- Genre: Electropop; Scandipop
- Length: 37:51
- Label: Cooking Vinyl

Nina Nesbitt chronology
The Sun Will Come Up, the Seasons Will Change (2019)	Älskar (2022)	Mountain Music (2024)

Singles from Älskar
- 1. "When You Lose Someone" Released: 11 February 2022; 2. "Dinner Table" Released: 20 April 2022; 3. "Pressure Makes Diamonds" Released: 8 June 2022; 4. "No Time (For My Life to Suck)" Released: 13 July 2022; 5. "Colours of You" Released: 23 August 2022; 6. "Need You" Released: 27 October 2022

Professional ratings
Review scores
Source	Rating
The Guardian	3/5 stars
The Daily Telegraph	3/5 stars
MusicOMH	3/5 stars

Älskar (transl. "loves") is the third studio album by the Scottish singer-songwriter Nina Nesbitt, released on 2 September 2022 through Cooking Vinyl. It was announced alongside the release of the single "Pressure Makes Diamonds" on 8 June 2022.

== Track listing ==
Älskar track listing
No.	Title	Writer(s)	Producer(s)	Length
1.	"Gaol"	Nina Lindberg Nesbitt		1:09
2.	"Teenage Chemistry"	Nesbitt; Svante Halldin; Jakob Hazell; Sara Hjellström	Jack & Coke	2:52
3.	"No Time (For My Life to Suck)"	Nesbitt; Elvira Anderfjärd; Rickard Göransson	Anderfjärd	2:33
4.	"Pressure Makes Diamonds"	Nesbitt; Halldin; Hazell; Hjellström	Jack & Coke	2:43
5.	"Dinner Table"	Nesbitt; Ollie Green	Ollie Green	3:18
6.	"When You Lose Someone"	Nesbitt; Simon Hassle; Fanny Hultman	Simon Hassle; Fanny Hultman	3:02
7.	"I Should Be a Bird"	Nesbitt; Hultman; Madelene Eliasson	Fanny Hultman; Madeleine Eliasson	3:59
8.	"Colours of You"	Nesbitt; Dan Wilson; Nick Long	Dan Wilson	3:38
9.	"Limited Edition"	Nesbitt; Breanna Jacobson; Daniel Muckala	Dan Muckala	2:54
10.	"Older Guys"	Nesbitt	Nesbitt	4:14
11.	"Heirlooms"	Nesbitt; Dave Gibson	Nesbitt	4:28
12.	"Älskar"	Nesbitt; Halldin; Hazell; Hjellström	Nesbitt; Jack & Coke	3:01
Total length:				37:51

Älskar Nights Deluxe version track listing
No.	Title	Writer(s)	Length
13.	"Need You" (featuring Zion Foster)	Nesbitt; Zion Foster; Jordan Riley; Steve Robson	3:10
14.	"Need You" (solo version)	Nesbitt; Riley; Robson	3:10
15.	"Love Seasons"	Nesbitt	2:47
16.	"Summer Fling"	Nesbitt	3:36
17.	"Life's a Bitch (L.A.B)"	Nesbitt; Halldin; Hazell	2:59
18.	"Summer Fling" (acoustic version)	Nesbitt	3:37
19.	"Life's a Bitch (L.A.B)" (acoustic version)	Nesbitt; Halldin; Hazell	3:03
20.	"Älskar" (acoustic version)	Nesbitt; Halldin; Hazell; Hjellström	2:55
21.	"Teenage Chemistry" (acoustic version)	Nesbitt; Halldin; Hazell; Hjellström	3:27
22.	"Colours of You" (Room with a view version)	Nesbitt; Wilson; Long	3:40
Total length:			70:15

Älskar CD bonus tracks
No.	Title	Writer(s)	Length
13.	"Summer Fling"	Nesbitt	3:36
14.	"Life's a Bitch (L.A.B)"	Nesbitt; Halldin; Hazell	2:59
15.	"Summer Fling" (acoustic version)	Nesbitt	3:37
16.	"Life's a Bitch (L.A.B)" (acoustic version)	Nesbitt; Halldin; Hazell	3:03
Total length:			51:06

== Charts ==
Chart performance for Älskar
Chart (2022)	Peak position
Belgian Albums (Ultratop Wallonia)	117
Scottish Albums (OCC)	3
UK Albums (OCC)	34
UK Independent Albums (OCC)	2
