= Selfies (song) =

Single by Nina Nesbitt

from the album Peroxide
- Released: 7 February 2014
- Genre: Pop
- Length: 3:26
- Label: Republic
- Songwriter(s): Nina Nesbitt; Thom Kirkpatrick
- Producer(s): James Earp

Nina Nesbitt singles chronology
"Don't Stop" (2013)	"Selfies" (2014)	"Chewing Gum" (2016)

Music video
- "Selfies" on YouTube

"Selfies" is a song by the Scottish singer-songwriter Nina Nesbitt. It was released on 7 February 2014, through Republic Records, as the “official” lead single from her debut album Peroxide (2014). The song has peaked at number 40 on the UK Singles Chart. The song was written by Nina Nesbitt and Thom Kirkpatrick.

== Music video ==
A music video to accompany the release of "Selfies" was first released onto YouTube on 15 December 2013 at a total length of three minutes and forty-two seconds.

== Track listing ==
Digital download
No.	Title	Length
1.	"Selfies"	3:26

== Chart performance ==
=== Weekly charts ===
Chart (2014)	Peak position
Belgium (Ultratip Bubbling Under Flanders)	64
Scotland (OCC)	23
UK Singles (OCC)	40

== Release history ==
Region	Date	Format	Label
United Kingdom	7 February 2014	Digital download	Universal Music Group
