= Perrie Edwards =

English singer (born 1993)

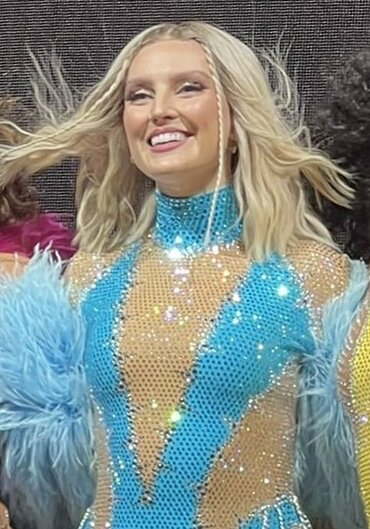
- Edwards in 2022
- Born: Perrie Louise Edwards; 10 July 1993 (age 33); South Shields, Tyne and Wear, England
- Occupation: Singer
- Years active: 2011–present
- Works: Solo discography; Little Mix discography; filmography
- Spouse: Alex Oxlade-Chamberlain (m. 2026)
- Children: 2
- Musical career
- Genres: Pop; R&B; dance; soul
- Instrument: Vocals
- Label: Columbia
- Member of: Little Mix
- Website: perrieofficial.com

Perrie Louise Edwards (born 10 July 1993) is an English singer. Her music career began when she auditioned for The X Factor UK, and joined the line up for Little Mix. Formed during the show's eighth series, Little Mix became the first group to win the competition, and together went on to release six studio albums and amassed nineteen UK top-ten singles, five of which reached number one. Before going on hiatus in 2022, they became the first girl group to win the Brit Award for British Group.

Edwards launched her career as a solo artist in 2024 with the single "Forget About Us", which peaked inside the top ten on the UK Singles Chart. It was followed up by singles "Tears", "You Go Your Way" and "If He Wanted to He Would". Her debut solo album, Perrie, was released on September 26, 2025, and reached number three on the UK Albums Chart.

Edwards is also a patron for CoppaFeel! and is the first female ambassador for the brand Supreme Nutrition. In 2021, she launched a fashion brand, Disora.

== Early life ==
Perrie Louise Edwards was born on 10 July 1993 and raised in South Shields, Tyne and Wear. She was named after Steve Perry from the rock band Journey. Her parents, Deborah Duffy and Alexander Edwards, divorced when she was a child and both remarried. Her mother married Mark Duffy from New Zealand, and her father married Joanna Wells. She has an older brother called Jonnie Edwards and a half-sister named Caitlin Edwards.

As a child, Edwards attended Radipole Primary School in Weymouth, Dorset before moving back to South Shields. She attended St. Peter and Paul RC Primary School, and Mortimer Community College in South Shields, and later transferred to Newcastle College, where she received a BTEC in Performing Arts. As a preteen she lived two years in Hamilton, New Zealand. Edwards was born with oesophageal atresia, which is responsible for the bisectional scar on her stomach, and anosmia. As a child, she underwent several operations because of the condition.

== Career ==
=== 2011–2022: Career beginnings and Little Mix ===
In 2011, at age 17, Edwards auditioned for The X Factor with "You Oughta Know" by Alanis Morissette. After she failed the first bootcamp challenge to progress through to the Girls category (solo females aged 16–24), she was placed into a four-piece group named Faux Pas with Jesy Nelson. Jade Thirlwall and Leigh-Anne Pinnock were in another group called Orion. Both groups failed to progress through the next stage. A decision was made by the judges to bring back the four to form a new four-piece group called Rhythmix and they progressed to the judges' houses.

They eventually reached the live shows and were mentored by Tulisa Contostavlos. On 28 October 2011, it was announced that the group's name had been changed to Little Mix. On 11 December 2011, Little Mix were announced as the winners, making them the first band ever to win the British version of the show.

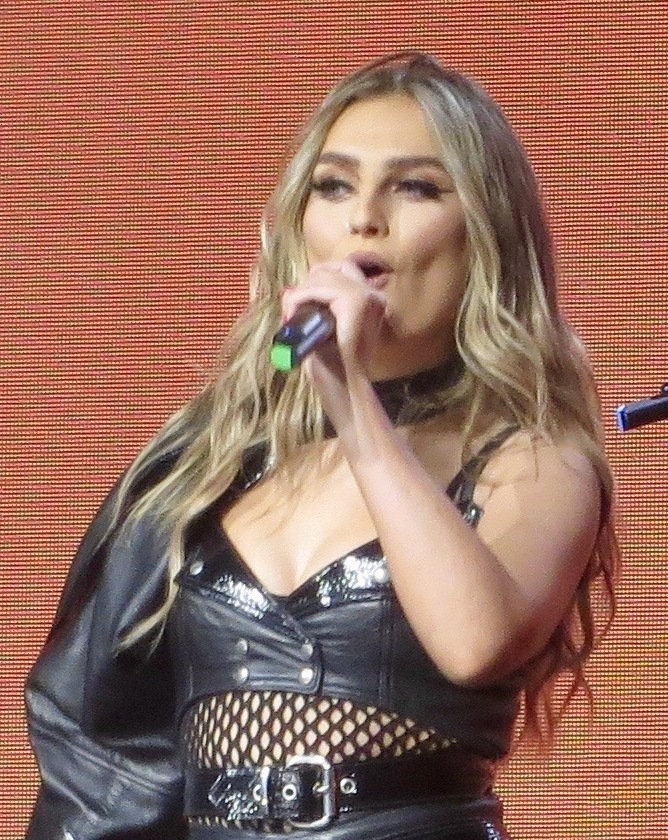
Edwards performing as part of Little Mix in 2017

Edwards released six albums and one greatest hits album with the group, DNA (2012), Salute (2013), Get Weird (2015), Glory Days (2016), LM5 (2018), Confetti (2020) and Between Us (2021). Since their debut, the group has been cited for helping the girl band renaissance in the UK. They have gone onto become one of the best-selling girl groups and one of Britain's biggest selling acts. In December 2021, the group announced they would be going on a hiatus, after the Confetti Tour in May 2022, to allow its members to pursue solo projects.

=== 2022–present: Disora and Perrie ===
In November 2022, Edwards' estimated net worth was revealed to be £17.5 million, appearing on the Sunday Times Rich List, for the first time. In March 2023, Edwards signed a recording contract with Columbia Records. Later that month, her clothing brand Disora became one of only 6% of brands to sell a size 18 and above. In May, she announced her partnership with BetterHelp, a virtual counseling and therapy company to help people gain access to therapy.

In November 2023, Edwards appeared on the Sunday Times Rich List for a second consecutive year. In the same month, she revealed that her first solo album was almost complete. In February 2024, Edwards began teasing her upcoming first solo single and revealed a new Instagram account called 'Perrie HQ', which would be managed by her team. In March, she officially announced her debut solo single titled "Forget About Us", which was released on 12 April 2024, and peaked at number ten on the UK Singles Chart. In June 2024, she announced her second single titled "Tears", which was released on 21 June 2024. She performed both singles and a cover of "I Wanna Dance with Somebody (Who Loves Me)" by Whitney Houston at Capital FM's Summertime Ball. On 12 July 2024, "Tears" was performed on The One Show. In September 2024, she announced her third single titled "You Go Your Way", which was released on 4 October 2024, and performed the song live on The Graham Norton Show the same night.

Edwards released her first promotional single, "Me, Myself & You" on 8 November 2024, a previous B-side from physical copies of "You Go Your Way". On 15 November 2024, she released the Christmas single "Christmas Magic", and performed the song and her previous for singles at Capital FM's Jingle Bell Ball on 7 December 2024. She featured as a guest panellist on Series 7 of The Masked Singer UK, which aired on 24 January 2026.

On 14 February 2025, Edwards released her second promotional single "Rollercoaster". Her next single, "If He Wanted to He Would", was released on 22 August of the same year. On 5 September 2025, she released her third promotional single "Cute Aggression". Her first solo album, Perrie, was released on 26 September 2025.

On 29 May 2026, Edwards released "Passenger Princess", after the song was initially featured as a "very rough" demo on the fan edition of her first studio album. Following the birth of her daughter, she re-recorded the song and released it as a single. Edwards debuted the song live at the 2026 edition of Mighty Hoopla on 31 May. In August 2026, it was reported she had departed Modest Management and Columbia Records, signing with Various Artists Management.

== Endorsements ==
Edwards is a patron for CoppaFeel!, a breast cancer charity. In 2019, she became the face of Italian brand Superga and released a designed collection of shoes. In 2020, she was announced as the first female ambassador for Supreme Nutrition. Later that year, Edwards became the new face of Nando's, a Portuguese-African food franchise. She also appeared in their television advertisements.

In 2021, Edwards launched her own fashion brand, Disora, describing it as a "contemporary luxury" brand. Disora's first collection, DS001, sold out within 48 hours but received criticism at the brand's lack of size inclusivity. In 2023, in an interview for Grazia, Edwards stated that Disora had become inclusive for all sizes, making it one of only 6% of brands that sell a size 18 and above.

== Personal life ==
In February 2017, it was confirmed that Edwards was dating English professional footballer Alex Oxlade-Chamberlain. She gave birth to a son in August 2021. On 18 June 2022, the pair announced their engagement. On 27 September 2022, Edwards and Oxlade-Chamberlain were at home with their son when burglars broke in, with police being called to the incident. In 2025, Edwards revealed that she had suffered two miscarriages: one prior to the birth of her son, and a second at 24 weeks' gestation, after Little Mix's Confetti Tour in May 2022. She gave birth to a daughter in January 2026. Edwards and Oxlade‑Chamberlain were married in Portugal in June 2026.

In 2012, during the recording stages for the group's debut album DNA (2012), Edwards had to undergo surgery to remove her inflamed tonsils. In 2017, she was set to perform alongside Little Mix in Las Vegas, but was hospitalised for gastric problems. In August 2018, she received further treatment on her throat for her oesophageal condition. In April 2019, Edwards shared her experience of panic attacks and anxiety with the magazine Glamour, describing the intense physical sensations that she thought were the result of a heart attack. She later underwent therapy, which she said "helped hugely." In a follow-up interview for Grazia in 2023, Edwards revealed she experienced bullying as a child because of her appearance. She had issues with anemia and was left malnourished because of her condition with oesophageal atresia. In 2024, in an interview with Nikkie de Jager, Edwards revealed she is partially deaf.

== Selected works ==
- (with Jesy Nelson, Leigh-Anne Pinnock and Jade Thirlwall) Little Mix: Ready to Fly (London, 2012) ISBN 978-0007488162

== Awards and nominations ==
Award	Year	Nominee(s)	Category	Result	Ref.
iHeartRadio Music Awards	2026	Perrie	Favorite Debut Album	Nominated	

== Discography ==
=== Studio album ===
List of studio albums
Title	Details	Peak chart positions				
Title	Details	UK	AUS	IRE	NLD	SCO
Perrie	Released: 26 September 2025; Label: Columbia; Formats: Cassette, CD, digital download, LP, streaming	3	51	37	40	3

=== Extended plays ===
List of EPs
Title	EP details
Apple Music Sessions: Perrie	Released: 12 July 2024; Label: Columbia; Format: Digital download, streaming
BBC Radio 1 Live Lounge Session	Released: 17 January 2025; Label: BBC Studios; Format: Digital download, streaming
BBC Radio 2 Piano Room	Released: 17 April 2026; Label: BBC Studios; Format: Digital download, streaming

=== Singles ===
List of singles as lead artist
Title	Year	Peak chart positions						Certifications	Album
Title	Year	UK	CRO Int. Air.	IRE	LAT	NZ Hot	SWE Heat.	Certifications	Album
"Forget About Us"	2024	10	38	22	19	16	11	BPI: Silver	Perrie
"Tears"	2024	69	—	—	—	—	—		Perrie (fan edition)
"You Go Your Way"	2024	52	—	—	—	—	—		Perrie
"Christmas Magic"	2024	— (Note: "Christmas Magic" did not enter the UK Singles Chart, but peaked at number 16 on the UK Singles Sales Chart.)	—	—	—	—	—		Non-album single
"If He Wanted to He Would"	2025	44	—	76	—	—	—		Perrie
"Miss You"	2025	— (Note: "Miss You" did not enter the UK Singles Chart, but peaked at number 60 on the UK Singles Sales Chart.)	—	—	—	—	—		Perrie
"Rocket Scientist"	2025	—	—	—	—	—	—		Perrie
"Passenger Princess"	2026	— (Note: "Passenger Princess" did not enter the UK Singles Chart, but peaked at number 47 on the UK Singles Sales Chart.)	—	—	—	—	—		Perrie (fan edition)
"—" denotes releases that did not chart or were not released in that region.

=== Promotional singles ===
List of promotional singles
Title	Year	Peak chart positions	Album
Title	Year	UK Sales	Album
"Me, Myself & You"	2024	25	Perrie (fan edition)
"Rollercoaster"	2025	46	Perrie (fan edition)
"Cute Aggression"	2025	29	Perrie
"Woman in Love"	2026	95	Perrie (fan edition)
"—" denotes releases that did not chart or were not released in that region.

=== Songwriting credits ===
List of songwriting credits, with year released and album shown
Year	Artist	Album	Song	Notes
2012	Little Mix	DNA	"Wings"	Co-writer
2012	Little Mix	DNA	"DNA"	Co-writer
2012	Little Mix	DNA	"Change Your Life"	Co-writer
2012	Little Mix	DNA	"How Ya Doin'?"	Co-writer
2013	Little Mix	Salute	"Salute"	Co-writer
2013	Little Mix	Salute	"Move"	Co-writer
2013	Little Mix	Salute	"Little Me"	Co-writer
2015	Britney Spears and Iggy Azalea	Non-album single	"Pretty Girls"	Co-writer
2016	Little Mix	Glory Days	"Shout Out to My Ex"	Co-writer
2020	Little Mix	Confetti	"Break Up Song"	Co-writer
2020	Little Mix	Confetti	"Holiday"	Co-writer
2021	Galantis, David Guetta and Little Mix	Between Us	"Heartbreak Anthem"	Co-writer
2021	Little Mix	Between Us	"No"	Co-writer
2024	Herself	Perrie	"Forget About Us"	Co-writer
2024	Herself	Perrie	"You Go Your Way"	Co-writer
2024	Herself	Perrie (fan edition)	"Me, Myself & You"	Co-writer
2024	Herself	Non-album single	"Christmas Magic"	Co-writer
2025	Herself	Perrie (fan edition)	"Rollercoaster"	Co-writer
2025	Twice	This Is For	"Mars"	Co-writer
2025	Herself	Perrie	"If He Wanted to He Would"	Co-writer
2025	Herself	Perrie	"Cute Aggression"	Co-writer
2025	Herself	Perrie	"Miss You"	Co-writer
2025	Herself	Perrie	"Sand Dancer"	Co-writer
2025	Herself	Perrie	"Baby Steps"	Co-writer
2025	Herself	Perrie	"Bonnie and Clyde"	Co-writer
2025	Herself	Perrie	"Punchline"	Co-writer
2025	Herself	Perrie	"Put You First"	Co-writer
2025	Herself	Perrie	"Absofuckinglutely"	Co-writer
2025	Herself	Perrie	"Where You Are"	Co-writer
2025	Herself	Perrie	"Same Place Different View"	Co-writer
2025	Herself	Perrie	"Goodbye My Friend"	Co-writer
2025	Herself	Perrie (fan edition)	"Woman in Love"	Co-writer
2025	Herself	Perrie (fan edition)	"2-2"	Co-writer
2025	Herself	Perrie (fan edition)	"Passenger Princess" (demo)	Co-writer
2025	Herself	Perrie (fan edition)	"Heartbeat"	Co-writer

== Videography ==
=== Music videos ===
Main artist music videos
Title	Director(s)	Originating album	Year	Ref.
"Forget About Us"	Jake Nava	Perrie	2024	
"Tears"	Quentin Jones	Non-album single	2024	
"You Go Your Way"	Charlie Di Placido	Perrie	2024	
"Christmas Magic"	Unknown	Non-album single	2024	
"If He Wanted to He Would"	Unknown	Perrie	2025	
"Rocket Scientist"	Unknown	Perrie	2025	
