= Olivia Dean discography =

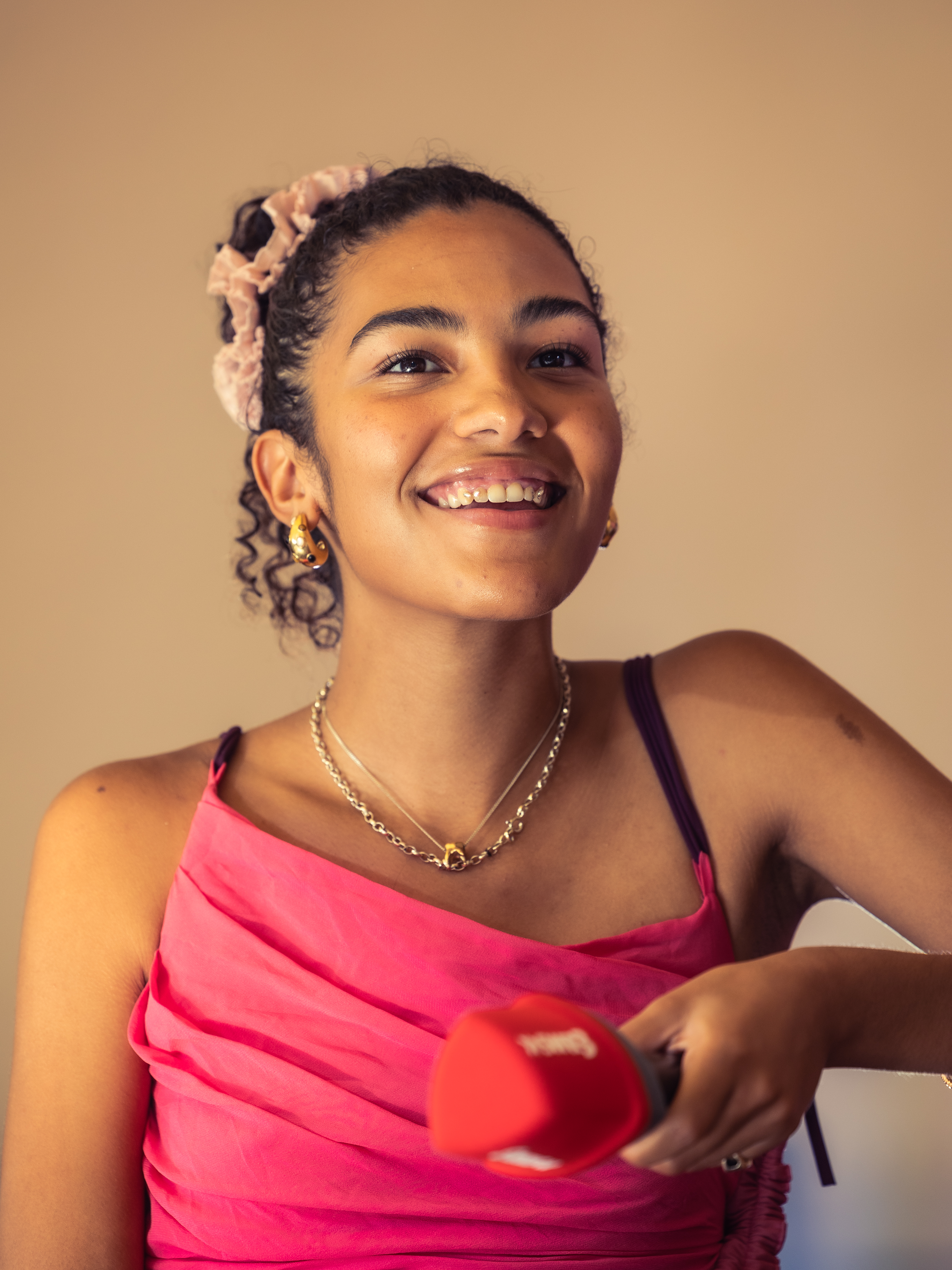
- Olivia Dean at the New Pop Festival in 2023
- Studio albums: 2
- EPs: 8
- Singles: 30
- Music videos: 16

The discography of English singer-songwriter Olivia Dean consists of two studio albums, five extended plays, and 28 singles. Born and raised in London, she self-released her debut single "Reason to Stay", in October 2018. After signing with AMF Records and Virgin EMI Records, she released her debut extended play, OK Love You Bye, in November 2019, followed by her second, What Am I Gonna Do on Sundays?, in December 2020. In June 2023, she released her debut studio album, Messy, which debuted and peaked at number four on the UK Albums Chart. Her second studio album, The Art of Loving, was released in September 2025, preceded by the singles "Nice to Each Other", "Lady Lady", and "Man I Need", and the concurrent release of the single "So Easy (To Fall in Love)". The album debuted at the top of the UK Albums Chart.

== Studio albums ==
List of studio albums, with selected details, chart positions and certifications
Title	Details	Peak chart positions										Sales	Certifications
Title	Details	UK	AUS	CAN	IRE	NLD	NOR	NZ	SCO	SWI	US	Sales	Certifications
Messy	Released: 30 June 2023; Label: EMI; Formats: CD, cassette, LP, digital	4	— (Note: Messy did not enter the ARIA top 100, but peaked at number 20 on the ARIA On Replay Chart, a chart for releases more than two years old.)	—	11	17	32	—	10	32	137		BPI: Gold; MC: Gold; RMNZ: Platinum
The Art of Loving	Released: 26 September 2025; Label: Capitol, Polydor; Formats: CD, cassette, LP, digital	1	1	3	1	1	2	1	1	4	3	US: 201,000	BPI: 2× Platinum; ARIA: 2× Platinum; IFPI NOR: 2× Platinum; IFPI SWI: Gold; MC: Platinum; NVPI: Platinum; RIAA: Gold; RMNZ: 5× Platinum
"—" denotes recording that did not chart in that territory.

== Live albums ==
List of live albums
Title	Details	Peak chart positions
Title	Details	UK
Live at the Jazz Café	Released: 22 October 2021; Label: AMF, EMI; Format: digital, LP (2024 RSD exclusive)	— (Note: Live at the Jazz Café did not enter the top 100 UK Albums Chart, but peaked at number 6 on the UK Hip Hop and R&B Albums Chart in 2024.)
Live at Eventim Apollo	Released: 20 December 2024; Label: Capitol, Polydor; Format: 2×LP, digital	— (Note: Live at Eventim Apollo did not enter the top 100 UK Albums Chart, but peaked at number 76 on the UK Physical Albums Chart and number 40 on the UK Record Store Chart.)

== EPs ==
List of extended plays, with selected details and chart positions and certifications
Title	Details	Peak chart positions			Certifications
Title	Details	UK	NLD	SCO	Certifications
OK Love You Bye	Released: 22 November 2019; Label: AMF, Virgin EMI; Format: Digital	—	—	—	
What Am I Gonna Do on Sundays?	Released: 4 December 2020; Label: AMF, EMI; Format: Digital	—	—	—	
Olivia Dean If You Know What I Mean	Released: 4 June 2021; Label: Universal, EMI; Format: Digital, LP (2022); Note: Compilation EP	— (Note: Olivia Dean If You Know What I Mean did not enter the top 100 UK Albums Chart, but peaked at number 28 on the UK Record Store Chart.)	—	19	
Growth	Released: 30 July 2021; Label: AMF, EMI; Format: Digital, LP (2026)	42	6	9	BPI: Silver
With Love	Released: 12 April 2025; Label: Capitol, Polydor; Format: LP (2025 RSD exclusive)	— (Note: With Love did not enter the top 100 UK Albums Chart, but peaked at number 7 on both the UK Vinyl Singles Chart and Physical Singles Chart.)	—	—	
Spotify Live Room	Released: 10 September 2025; Label: Capitol, Polydor; Format: Streaming	—	—	—	
Apple Music Nashville Sessions	Released: 14 November 2025; Label: Capitol, Polydor; Format: Digital download, streaming	—	—	—	
BBC Radio 1 Live Lounge	Released: 18 April 2026; Label: Capitol, Polydor; Format: LP (2026 RSD exclusive)	— (Note: BBC Radio 1 Live Lounge (also known as "You've Got a Friend") did not enter the top 100 UK Albums Chart, but peaked at number 2 on both the UK Vinyl Singles Chart and Physical Singles Chart.)	—	—	
"—" denotes recording that did not chart in that territory.

== Singles ==
List of singles as lead artist, with select chart positions and certifications, showing year released and album name
Title	Year	Peak chart positions										Certifications	Album
Title	Year	UK	AUS	CAN	IRE	NLD	NOR	NZ	SWE	US	WW	Certifications	Album
"Reason to Stay"	2018	—	—	—	—	—	—	—	—	—	—	BPI: Silver; RMNZ: Gold	OK Love You Bye
"Password Change"	2019	—	—	—	—	—	—	—	—	—	—		OK Love You Bye
"OK Love You Bye"	2019	— (Note: "OK Love You Bye" did not enter the UK Singles Chart, but peaked at number 36 on the UK Streaming Chart.)	51	—	13	— (Note: "OK Love You Bye" did not enter the Dutch Single Top 100, but peaked at number three on the Single Tip chart.)	—	— (Note: "OK Love You Bye" did not enter the NZ Top 40 Singles Chart, but peaked at number five on the NZ Catalogue Singles Chart, a chart for songs over 18 months old.)	— (Note: "OK Love You Bye" did not enter the Swedish Singellista Chart, but peaked at number 19 on the Swedish Heatseeker Chart.)	—	—	BPI: Platinum; ARIA: Platinum; RMNZ: 2× Platinum	OK Love You Bye
"Just for You"	2019	—	—	—	—	—	—	—	—	—	—		Non-album singles
"Crosswords"	2020	—	—	—	—	—	—	—	—	—	—		Non-album singles
"Baby Come Home"	2020	—	—	—	—	—	—	—	—	—	—		Non-album singles
"The Hardest Part"	2020	19	— (Note: "The Hardest Part" did not enter the ARIA Singles Chart, but peaked at number 3 on the ARIA On Replay Chart, a chart for songs more than two years old.)	—	22	49	—	— (Note: "The Hardest Part" did not enter the NZ Top 40 Singles Chart, but peaked at number one on the NZ Catalogue Singles Chart, a chart for songs over 18 months old.)	—	—	109	BPI: 2× Platinum; ARIA: Platinum; MC: Gold; RMNZ: 3× Platinum	What Am I Gonna Do on Sundays?
"Echo"	2020	—	—	—	—	—	—	— (Note: "Echo" did not enter the NZ Top 40 Singles Chart, but peaked at number 39 on the NZ Catalogue Singles Chart, a chart for songs over 18 months old.)	—	—	—	BPI: Silver; RMNZ: Gold	What Am I Gonna Do on Sundays?
"Merry Christmas Everyone"	2020	—	—	—	—	—	—	—	—	—	—		Non-album single
"Be My Own Boyfriend"	2021	—	—	—	—	—	—	—	—	—	—		Growth
"Slowly"	2021	—	—	—	—	—	—	—	—	—	—		Growth
"The Christmas Song"	2021	19	—	79	—	— (Note: "The Christmas Song" did not enter the Dutch Single Top 100, but peaked at number one on the Single Tip chart.)	—	—	—	88	162		Non-album singles
"Wish I Didn't Miss You" (Mahogany Sessions)	2022	—	—	—	—	—	—	—	—	—	—		Non-album singles
"Danger"	2022	—	—	—	—	—	—	—	—	—	—		Messy
"UFO"	2023	—	—	—	—	—	—	—	—	—	—		Messy
"Dive"	2023	17	— (Note: "Dive" did not enter the ARIA Singles Chart, but peaked at number 4 on the ARIA On Replay Chart, a chart for songs more than two years old.)	—	41	68	—	— (Note: "Dive" did not enter the NZ Top 40 Singles Chart, but peaked at number two on the NZ Catalogue Singles Chart, a chart for songs over 18 months old.)	— (Note: "Dive" did not enter the Swedish Singellista Chart, but peaked at number 1 on the Swedish Heatseeker Chart.)	—	109	BPI: Platinum; ARIA: Platinum; MC: Gold; RIAA: Gold; RMNZ: 2× Platinum	Messy
"Carmen"	2023	—	—	—	—	—	—	— (Note: "Carmen" did not enter the NZ Top 40 Singles Chart, but peaked at number 36 on the NZ Catalogue Singles Chart, a chart for songs over 18 months old.)	—	—	—		Messy
"The Hardest Part" (re-release with Leon Bridges)	2023	—	—	—	—	—	—	— (Note: "The Hardest Part" (re-release with Leon Bridges) did not enter the NZ Top 40 Singles Chart, but peaked at number 27 on the NZ Hot 40 Singles Chart.)	75	—	—		Non-album single
"Ladies Room"	2023	—	—	—	—	—	—	— (Note: "Ladies Room" did not enter the NZ Top 40 Singles Chart, but peaked at number 19 on the NZ Catalogue Singles Chart, a chart for songs over 18 months old.)	—	—	—	BPI: Silver; RMNZ: Gold	Messy
"Time"	2024	—	—	—	—	—	—	—	—	—	—		Non-album single
"You Can't Hurry Love" (Live at Jools' Annual Hootenanny with Jools Holland and his Rhythm and Blues Orchestra)	2024	—	—	—	—	—	—	— (Note: "You Can't Hurry Love" did not enter the NZ Top 40 Singles Chart, but peaked at number 32 on the NZ Hot 40 Singles Chart.)	—	—	—		With Love
"Touching Toes"	2024	—	—	—	—	—	—	— (Note: "Touching Toes" did not enter the NZ Top 40 Singles Chart, but peaked at number 26 on the NZ Hot 40 Singles Chart.)	—	—	—		With Love
"It Isn't Perfect But It Might Be"	2025	36	—	—	81	—	—	— (Note: "It Isn't Perfect But It Might Be" did not enter the NZ Top 40 Singles Chart, but peaked at number 30 on the NZ Hot 40 Singles Chart.)	—	—	—	BPI: Gold; RMNZ: Platinum	Bridget Jones: Mad About the Boy (Original Motion Picture Soundtrack)
"Nice to Each Other"	2025	4	8	48	4	26	57	7	50	65	52	BPI: 2× Platinum; ARIA: 4× Platinum; IFPI SWE: Gold; MC: Platinum; RIAA: Gold; RMNZ: 3× Platinum	The Art of Loving
"Rein Me In" (with Sam Fender)	2025	1	1	35	1	3	11	1	25	45	32	BPI: 4× Platinum; ARIA: 2× Platinum; MC: Platinum; RIAA: Platinum; RMNZ: 4× Platinum	People Watching (Deluxe)
"Lady Lady"	2025	38	41	—	70	—	—	15	—	— (Note: "Lady Lady" did not enter the Billboard Hot 100, but peaked at number 9 on the Bubbling Under Hot 100 chart.)	—	BPI: Gold; ARIA: Platinum; RMNZ: Platinum	The Art of Loving
"Man I Need"	2025	1	1	1	1	1	3	1	3	2	2	BPI: 5× Platinum; ARIA: 9× Platinum; IFPI NOR: Platinum; IFPI SWE: 2× Platinum; MC: 2× Platinum; RIAA: 2× Platinum; RMNZ: 8× Platinum	The Art of Loving
"So Easy (To Fall in Love)"	2025	2	2	3	3	7	13	2	21	5	7	BPI: 2× Platinum; ARIA: 5× Platinum; IFPI NOR: Platinum; IFPI SWE: Platinum; RIAA: Platinum; RMNZ: 4× Platinum	The Art of Loving
"A Couple Minutes"	2026	13	13	38	47	— (Note: "A Couple Minutes" did not enter the Dutch Single Top 100, but peaked at number three on the Single Tip chart.)	—	4	— (Note: "A Couple Minutes" did not enter the Swedish Singellista Chart, but peaked at number 1 on the Swedish Heatseeker Chart.)	26	40	BPI: Platinum; ARIA: 2× Platinum; RIAA: Gold; RMNZ: 3× Platinum	The Art of Loving
"Baby Steps"	2026	30	20	75	29	— (Note: "Baby Steps" did not enter the Dutch Single Top 100, but peaked at number 11 on the Single Tip chart.)	—	10	— (Note: "Baby Steps" did not enter the Swedish Singellista Chart, but peaked at number 16 on the Swedish Heatseeker Chart.)	91	187	BPI: Platinum; ARIA: 2× Platinum; RMNZ: 2× Platinum	The Art of Loving
"—" denotes recording that did not chart in that territory.

== Other charted and certified songs ==
List of other charted songs, with select chart positions and certifications, showing year released and album name
Title	Year	Peak chart positions									Certifications	Album
Title	Year	UK	AUS	CAN	IRE	NOR	NZ	POR	US	WW	Certifications	Album
"No One's Watching Me" (Ezra Collective featuring Olivia Dean)	2024	—	—	—	—	—	—	—	—	—	BPI: Silver; RMNZ: Gold	Dance, No One's Watching
"The Dress" (Dijon cover)	2025	—	—	—	—	—	— (Note: "The Dress" did not enter the NZ Top 40 Singles Chart, but peaked at number 22 on the NZ Hot 40 Singles Chart.)	—	—	—		Non-album song
"Close Up"	2025	— (Note: "Close Up" did not enter the UK Singles Chart, but peaked at number 56 on the UK Streaming Chart.)	88	—	—	—	—	—	—	—	BPI: Silver; RMNZ: Gold	The Art of Loving
"Let Alone the One You Love"	2025	21	25	68	55	87	10	157	71	130	BPI: Gold; ARIA: Platinum; RIAA: Gold; RMNZ: 2× Platinum	The Art of Loving
"Something Inbetween"	2025	— (Note: "Something Inbetween" did not enter the UK Singles Chart, but peaked at number 46 on the UK Streaming Chart.)	65	—	—	—	30	—	—	—	BPI: Silver; ARIA: Gold; RMNZ: Gold	The Art of Loving
"Loud"	2025	— (Note: "Loud" did not enter the UK Singles Chart, but peaked at number 54 on the UK Streaming Chart.)	99	—	—	—	— (Note: "Loud" did not enter the NZ Top 40 Singles Chart, but peaked at number 36 on the NZ Hot Singles Chart.)	—	—	—	BPI: Silver; RMNZ: Gold	The Art of Loving
"I've Seen It"	2025	60	41	74	14	54	20	—	99	—	BPI: Gold; ARIA: Gold; RMNZ: Platinum	The Art of Loving
"Diamonds on the Soles of Her Shoes"	2025	— (Note: "Diamonds on the Soles of Her Shoes" did not enter the UK Singles Chart, but peaked at number 13 on the UK R&B Chart.)	—	—	—	—	—	—	—	—		Apple Music Nashville Sessions
"—" denotes recording that did not chart in that territory.

== Guest appearances ==
Title	Year	Other artist(s)	Album
"Adrenaline"	2019	Rudimental	Toast to Our Differences
"Dy-Na-Mi-Tee"	2020	—N/a	Apple Music Home Session
"Homerton"	2022	Loyle Carner and JNR Williams	Hugo
"Call Me a Lioness"	2023	Various (as Hope FC)	Non-album singles
"The Harder They Come"	2024	—N/a	This Town (soundtrack)
"No One's Watching Me"	2024	Ezra Collective	Dance, No One's Watching

== Music videos ==
Title	Year	Director	Ref.
"Password Change"	2019	Stella Scott	
"OK Love You Bye"	2019	Stella Scott	
"Crosswords"	2020	Fiona Jane Burgess	
"Baby Come Home"	2020	Olivia Dean	
"The Hardest Part"	2020	Claire Arnold	
"Echo"	2020	Aliyah Otchere	
"Slowly"	2021	Rhory Danniells & Olivia Dean	
"Danger"	2022	Malin Osafo	
"UFO" (Take 1)	2022	Nicolee Tsin	
"Dive"	2023	Candice Lo	
"Time"	2024	Jake Erland	
"Nice to Each Other"	2025	Jake Erland	
"Rein Me In" (with Sam Fender)	2025	Daniel Broadley	
"Lady Lady"	2025	Jake Erland	
"Man I Need"	2025	Jake Erland	
"So Easy (To Fall in Love)"	2025	Jake Erland	
