= List of number-one singles of 2023 (Ireland) =

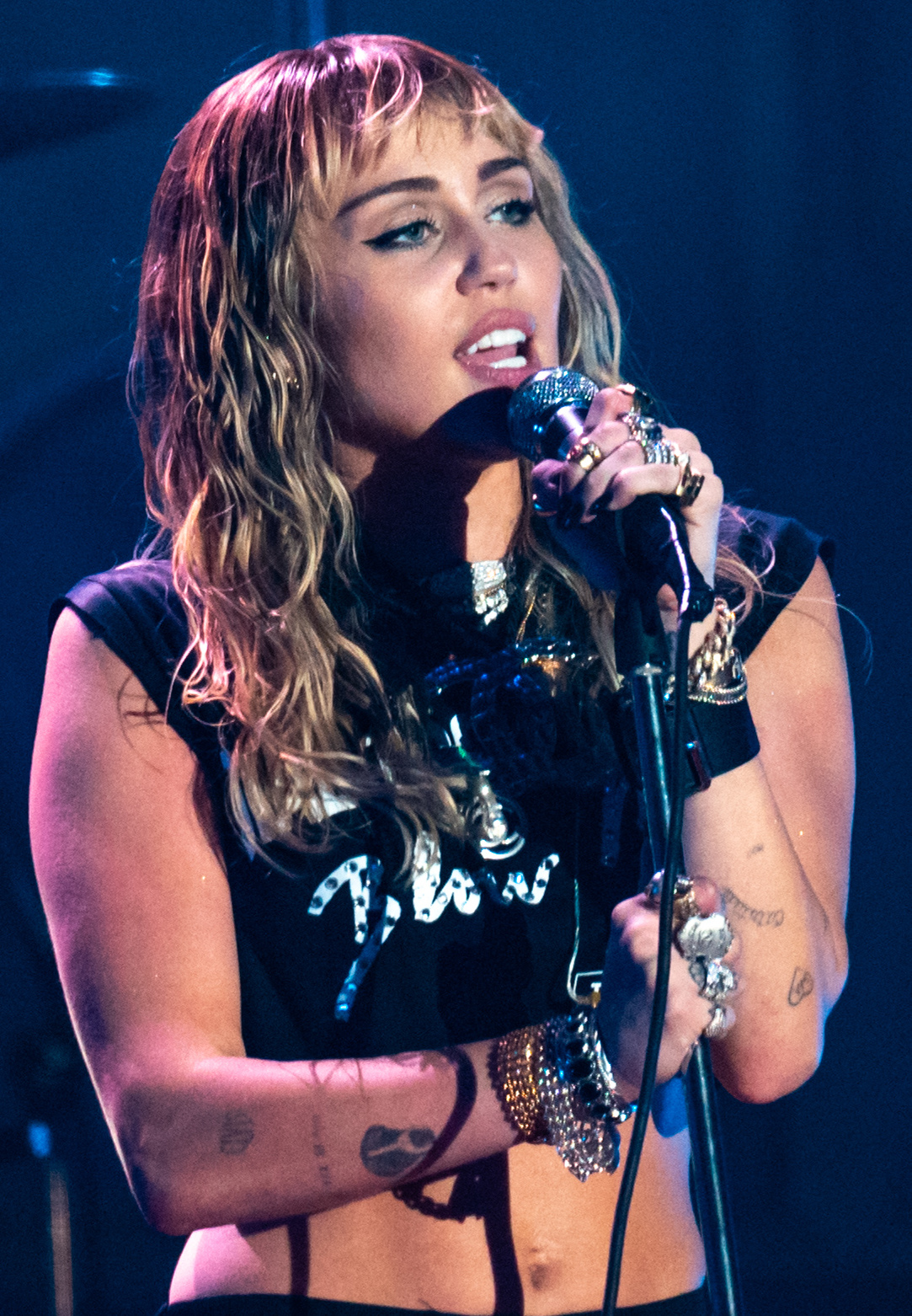
Miley Cyrus spent ten weeks at number one this year.

The Irish Singles Chart ranks the best-performing singles in Ireland, as compiled by the Official Charts Company on behalf of the Irish Recorded Music Association.

Issue date	Song	Artist(s)	Reference
6 January	"Escapism"	Raye featuring 070 Shake	
13 January	"Escapism"	Raye featuring 070 Shake	
20 January	"Flowers"	Miley Cyrus	
27 January	"Flowers"	Miley Cyrus	
3 February	"Flowers"	Miley Cyrus	
10 February	"Flowers"	Miley Cyrus	
17 February	"Flowers"	Miley Cyrus	
24 February	"Flowers"	Miley Cyrus	
3 March	"Flowers"	Miley Cyrus	
10 March	"Flowers"	Miley Cyrus	
17 March	"Flowers"	Miley Cyrus	
24 March	"Flowers"	Miley Cyrus	
31 March	"Miracle"	Calvin Harris and Ellie Goulding	
7 April	"Miracle"	Calvin Harris and Ellie Goulding	
14 April	"Miracle"	Calvin Harris and Ellie Goulding	
21 April	"Miracle"	Calvin Harris and Ellie Goulding	
28 April	"Miracle"	Calvin Harris and Ellie Goulding	
5 May	"Miracle"	Calvin Harris and Ellie Goulding	
12 May	"Miracle"	Calvin Harris and Ellie Goulding	
19 May	"Giving Me"	Jazzy	
26 May	"Giving Me"	Jazzy	
2 June	"Giving Me"	Jazzy	
9 June	"Sprinter"	Dave and Central Cee	
16 June	"Sprinter"	Dave and Central Cee	
23 June	"Sprinter"	Dave and Central Cee	
30 June	"Sprinter"	Dave and Central Cee	
7 July	"Vampire"	Olivia Rodrigo	
14 July	"Sprinter"	Dave and Central Cee	
21 July	"Sprinter"	Dave and Central Cee	
28 July	"Sprinter"	Dave and Central Cee	
4 August	"What Was I Made For?"	Billie Eilish	
11 August	"What Was I Made For?"	Billie Eilish	
18 August	"Dance the Night"	Dua Lipa	
25 August	"Dance the Night"	Dua Lipa	
1 September	"Paint the Town Red"	Doja Cat	
8 September	"Paint the Town Red"	Doja Cat	
15 September	"Adore U"	Fred Again	
22 September	"Paint the Town Red"	Doja Cat	
29 September	"Prada"	Cassö, Raye and D-Block Europe	
6 October	"Prada"	Cassö, Raye and D-Block Europe	
13 October	"Prada"	Cassö, Raye and D-Block Europe	
20 October	"Prada"	Cassö, Raye and D-Block Europe	
27 October	"Prada"	Cassö, Raye and D-Block Europe	
3 November	"Prada"	Cassö, Raye and D-Block Europe	
10 November	"Stick Season"	Noah Kahan	
17 November	"Stick Season"	Noah Kahan	
24 November	"Stick Season"	Noah Kahan	
1 December	"Stick Season"	Noah Kahan	
8 December	"Fairytale of New York"	The Pogues featuring Kirsty MacColl	
15 December	"Stick Season"	Noah Kahan	
22 December	"Stick Season"	Noah Kahan	
29 December	"Stick Season"	Noah Kahan	

== Number-one artists ==
Position	Artist	Weeks at No. 1
1	Miley Cyrus	10
2	Raye	8
3	Calvin Harris	7
3	Ellie Goulding	7
3	Dave	7
3	Central Cee	7
3	Noah Kahan	7
4	Cassö	6
4	D-Block Europe	6
5	Jazzy	3
5	Doja Cat	3
6	070 Shake	2
6	Billie Eilish	2
6	Dua Lipa	2
7	Olivia Rodrigo	1
7	Fred Again	1
7	The Pogues	1
7	Kirsty MacColl	1

== See also ==
- List of number-one albums of 2023 (Ireland)
