= List of number-one albums of 2023 (Ireland) =

The Irish Albums Chart ranks the best-performing albums in Ireland, as compiled by the Official Charts Company on behalf of the Irish Recorded Music Association.

== Chart history ==
Issue date	Album	Artist	Reference
6 January	Midnights	Taylor Swift	
13 January	Sonder	Dermot Kennedy	
20 January	Midnights	Taylor Swift	
27 January	Gigi's Recovery	The Murder Capital	
3 February	Gloria	Sam Smith	
10 February	Midnights	Taylor Swift	
17 February	Sitting Pretty	The Academic	
24 February	Cuts & Bruises	Inhaler	
3 March	Cracker Island	Gorillaz	
10 March	The Highlights	The Weeknd	
17 March	Endless Summer Vacation	Miley Cyrus	
24 March	Songs of Surrender	U2	
31 March	Did You Know That There's a Tunnel Under Ocean Blvd	Lana Del Rey	
7 April	The Record	Boygenius	
14 April	Seize the Day	Damien Dempsey	
21 April	72 Seasons	Metallica	
28 April	Midnights	Taylor Swift	
5 May	First Two Pages of Frankenstein	The National	
12 May	−	Ed Sheeran	
19 May	−	Ed Sheeran	
26 May	Broken by Desire to Be Heavenly Sent	Lewis Capaldi	
2 June	Midnights	Taylor Swift	
9 June	Harry's House	Harry Styles	
16 June	The Show	Niall Horan	
23 June	Harry's House	Harry Styles	
30 June	Sonder	Dermot Kennedy	
7 July	Sonder	Dermot Kennedy	
14 July	Speak Now (Taylor's Version)	Taylor Swift	
21 July	Speak Now (Taylor's Version)	Taylor Swift	
28 July	The Ballad of Darren	Blur	
4 August	Utopia	Travis Scott	
11 August	Victory	Cian Ducrot	
18 August	1989	Taylor Swift	
25 August	Unreal Unearth	Hozier	
1 September	Unreal Unearth	Hozier	
8 September	Unreal Unearth	Hozier	
15 September	Guts	Olivia Rodrigo	
22 September	Guts	Olivia Rodrigo	
29 September	Guts	Olivia Rodrigo	
6 October	Guts	Olivia Rodrigo	
13 October	For All the Dogs	Drake	
20 October	Crazymad, for Me	CMAT	
27 October	Hackney Diamonds	The Rolling Stones	
3 November	1989 (Taylor's Version)	Taylor Swift	
10 November	1989 (Taylor's Version)	Taylor Swift	
17 November	1989 (Taylor's Version)	Taylor Swift	
24 November	1989 (Taylor's Version)	Taylor Swift	
1 December	This Life	Take That	
8 December	Stick Season	Noah Kahan	
15 December	Rebel Diamonds	The Killers	
22 December	Stick Season	Noah Kahan	
29 December	Christmas	Michael Bublé	

== Number-one artists ==
Position	Artist	Weeks at No. 1
1	Taylor Swift	12
2	Olivia Rodrigo	4
3	Dermot Kennedy	3
3	Hozier	3
4	Ed Sheeran	2
4	Harry Styles	2
4	Noah Kahan	2
5	The Murder Capital	1
5	Sam Smith	1
5	The Academic	1
5	Inhaler	1
5	Gorillaz	1
5	The Weeknd	1
5	Miley Cyrus	1
5	U2	1
5	Lana Del Rey	1
5	Boygenius	1
5	Damien Dempsey	1
5	Metallica	1
5	The National	1
5	Lewis Capaldi	1
5	Niall Horan	1
5	Blur	1
5	Travis Scott	1
5	Cian Ducrot	1
5	Drake	1
5	CMAT	1
5	The Rolling Stones	1
5	Take That	1
5	The Killers	1
5	Michael Bublé	1

== See also ==
- List of number-one singles of 2023 (Ireland)
