= Tre Jean-Marie =

British songwriter and producer (born 1993)

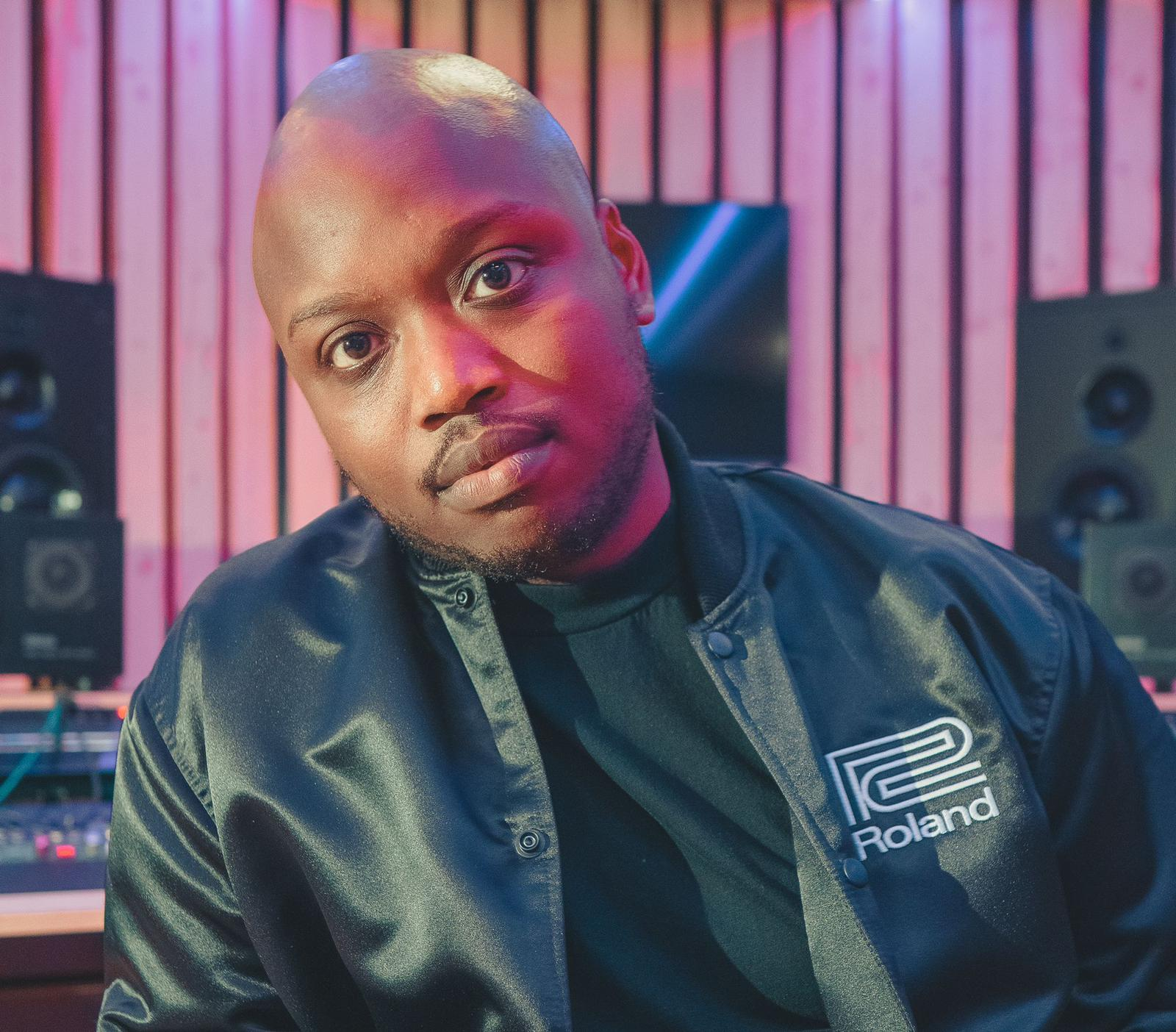
- Tre Jean-Marie in recording studio

Background information
- Born: Tre Jean-Marie; 13 April 1993 (age 33); Hackney, London
- Occupations: Songwriter, record producer, music publisher
- Instruments: Computer, keyboards, guitar, vocals
- Years active: 2006–present

Tre Jean-Marie (born 13 April 1993) is a Grammy nominated British songwriter and record producer. His writing and production credits include AJ Tracey, Anne-Marie, Burna Boy, Craig David, FLO, Jacob Banks, Joy Crookes, Kaytranada, Labrinth, Little Mix, Mabel, Nathan Dawe, Olivia Dean, and Tom Grennan amongst many others.

== Early life ==
Jean-Marie was born in Hackney, London and is of Trinidadian and St. Lucian descent. He is the son of singer-songwriters Lincoln Jean-Marie and Valerie-Suzette Jean-Marie.

== Career ==
In 2016, Jean-Marie became a frequent collaborator of the British artist Craig David, for whom he co-wrote and produced 15 tracks across Following My Intuition and The Time Is Now which peaked at number 1 and 2 respectively on the UK album chart.

In 2020, he co-wrote, produced, and mixed “Lighter” by Nathan Dawe featuring KSI which peaked at number 3 on the UK singles chart, was named one of the biggest selling songs of 2020, and went on to be nominated for Best British Single at the 2021 BRIT Awards. He also performed the same duties on Nathan Dawe's follow-up singles “No Time for Tears” with Little Mix, and “Way Too Long” with Anne-Marie & MoStack.

In addition, Jean-Marie owns publishing company Decibel. Decibel publishes songs on many chart-topping records including A$AP Rocky's At. Long. Last. ASAP and Ariana Grande's Dangerous Woman.

== Selective songwriting and production discography ==
Year	Title	Artist(s)	Album	Credits
2012	"Top of the World" feat. Professor Green	Smiler	Non-album single	Writer
2015	"Monster" feat. Avelino	Jacob Banks	The Paradox EP	Writer
2015	"Grace"	Jacob Banks	The Paradox EP	Writer/Producer
2016	"Got It Good" feat. Craig David	Kaytranada	99.9%	Writer
2016	"One More Time"	Craig David	Following My Intuition	Writer
2016	"Don't Go"	Craig David	Following My Intuition	Writer
2016	"16"	Craig David	Following My Intuition	Producer
2016	"Couldn't Be Mine"	Craig David	Following My Intuition	Writer/Producer
2016	"What If"	Craig David	Following My Intuition	Writer/Producer
2016	"Here with Me"	Craig David	Following My Intuition	Writer/Producer
2016	"Sink or Swim"	Craig David	Following My Intuition	Writer/Additional Producer
2017	"Praying"	Tom Grennan	Lighting Matches	Writer
2017	"Puff Puff Pass"	Brayton Bowman	22 Minutes Later	Writer/Producer
2017	"The Second I'm Rich"	Brayton Bowman	22 Minutes Later	Writer/Producer
2017	"Kustom Made"	Brayton Bowman	22 Minutes Later	Writer
2017	"Broke N' Down (Interlude)"	Brayton Bowman	22 Minutes Later	Writer
2017	"You Don't Know Me feat. Craig David	AJ Tracey	Secure the Bag! EP	Writer
2017	"I Won't Let You Down"	HRVY	Talk to Ya EP	Writer/Producer
2018	"Magic"	Craig David	The Time Is Now	Writer/Producer
2018	"Get Involved" feat. JP Cooper	Craig David	The Time Is Now	Writer/Producer
2018	"Live in the Moment" feat. GoldLink	Craig David	The Time Is Now	Writer/Vocal Producer
2018	"Talk to Me"	Craig David	The Time Is Now	Writer/Producer
2018	"Talk to Me, Pt. II" feat. Ella Mai	Craig David	The Time Is Now	Writer/Producer
2018	"Armour"	Craig David	The Time Is Now	Writer/Producer
2018	"Honeymoon Phaze"	MNEK	Language	Producer
2018	"Language"	MNEK	Language	Producer
2018	"Outside" feat. Mabel	Burna Boy	Outside	Writer
2018	"Name on It" feat. Burna Boy	Four of Diamonds	Non-album single	Writer/Producer
2018	"Stupid Things" feat. Saweetie	Four of Diamonds	Non-album single	Producer
2018	"Blind"	Four of Diamonds	Non-album single	Producer
2018	"Break the Rules" feat. Bobii Lewis	Tieks	Non-album single	Writer
2018	"Movie" feat. B Young, Kranium & Ebenezer	ADP	Non-album single	Writer
2018	"Intimate" feat. Craig David	Yungen	Non-album single	Writer/Producer
2018	"Don't Let Me Down"	Joy Crookes	Reminiscence EP	Producer
2018	"What If"	Ebenezer	53 Sundays	Writer/Producer
2019	"Favours" with Nat Dunn	Hayden James	Between Us	Writer
2019	"High Expectations (Intro)"	Mabel	High Expectations	Writer/Producer
2019	"High Expectations (Outro)"	Mabel	High Expectations	Writer/Producer
2019	"No Hands"	Joy Crookes	Perception EP	Additional Producer
2019	"Since I Left You"	Joy Crookes	Perception EP	Producer
2019	"Right Now" feat. Krept & Konan	The Vamps	Missing You EP	Producer
2019	"Sexy MF"	Labrinth	Imagination & the Misfit Kid	Additional Producer
2019	"Blood Ties"	Rak-Su	Rome EP	Writer/Producer
2019	"Save Me (Interlude)"	Jvck James	Detour EP	Writer/Producer/Mixer
2019	"Don't Answer" feat. Wiley	Kamille		Writer/Producer
2019	"Like I Do"	Awa	Cry Baby EP	Producer
2019	"Size"	Fleur East	Fearless	Writer/Producer
2019	"French Kisses" feat. Aitch	ZieZie	Non-album single	Writer/Producer
2019	"Loneliest Time of Year"	Mabel	Non-album single	Writer/Producer
2019	"One I've Been Missing"	Little Mix	Confetti (Expanded Edition)	Writer/Producer
2020	"Lighter" feat. KSI	Nathan Dawe	If Heaven Had A Phone Line	Writer/Producer/Mixer
2020	"Tell Me About It"	Ella Eyre	Quarter Life Crisis EP	Writer
2020	"Good Vibes" with Matoma	HRVY	Can Anybody Hear Me?	Writer/Producer
2020	"Happier"	Alana Maria	Non-album single	Producer
2020	"My Heart"	Alana Maria	Non-album single	Producer
2020	"Only a Woman"	Matt Lang	More	Writer
2020	"Supernatural"	Paloma Faith	Infinite Things	Writer/Producer
2020	"Me Time"	Paloma Faith	Infinite Things	Producer
2020	"Infinite Things"	Paloma Faith	Infinite Things	Additional Producer
2020	"Beautiful & Damned"	Paloma Faith	Infinite Things	Writer/Producer
2020	"Interruption"	Tiana Blake	Non-album single	Additional Producer
2020	"No Time for Tears" with Little Mix	Nathan Dawe	Confetti (Expanded Edition)	Writer/Producer/Mixer
2020	"Christmas Wishes" The Theme to The Loss Adjuster	Beverley Knight	Non-album single	Writer
2020	"Blame It On The Mistletoe" with AJ Mitchell	Ella Henderson	Non-album single	Writer/Producer/Mixer
2021	"Way Too Long" with Anne-Marie & MoStack	Nathan Dawe	Therapy	Writer/Producer
2021	"Unlovable" with Rudimental	Anne-Marie	Therapy	Writer/Producer
2021	"Better Not Together"	Anne-Marie	Therapy	Writer
2021	"Bounce" feat. Tion Wayne & Stay Flee Get Lizzy	S1mba	Good Time Long Time	Writer/Producer
2021	"Soundtrack to an Existential Crisis"	Au/Ra	Soundtrack to an Existential Crisis	Writer/Producer
2021	"Goodbye"	Nathan Dawe & T. Matthias	Non-album single	Writer/Producer
2021	"No"	Little Mix	Between Us	Writer/Producer
2021	"Between Us"	Little Mix	Between Us	Writer/Producer
2021	"Trash"	Little Mix	Between Us	Writer/Producer
2022	"Happy"	Josef Salvat	Islands	Writer
2022	"What About Us"	Ella Henderson	Everything I Didn't Say	Writer/Producer
2022	"Good Luck" with Jax Jones & Galantis	Mabel	About Last Night...	Writer
2022	"About Last Night... (Intro)"	Mabel	About Last Night...	Writer/Producer
2022	"Shy"	Mabel	About Last Night...	Writer/Producer
2022	"Definition"	Mabel	About Last Night...	Writer/Producer
2022	"Let Love Go" feat. Lil Tecca	Mabel	About Last Night...	Writer
2022	"When The Party's Over"	Mabel	About Last Night...	Writer/Producer
2022	"Jiggle Jiggle"	Jason Derulo, Duke & Jones, Louis Theroux, Amelia Dimz	Non-album single	Producer
2022	"Not My Job"	FLO	The Lead	Writer/Producer
2022	"Sweet Lies" with Talia Mar	Nathan Dawe	Non-album single	Writer/Producer
2022	"Damn (You’ve Got Me Saying)" with David Guetta & MNEK	Galantis	Non-album single	Writer/Producer
2022	"Message From My Ex"	Wes Nelson	Non-album single	Writer/Producer
2022	"Diamond Life" feat. MNEK	Leo Kalyan	Non-album single	Writer/Producer
2022	"Lost In You"	Sam Ryder	There's Nothing But Space, Man!	Writer/Producer
2022	"Ten Tons"	Sam Ryder	There's Nothing But Space, Man!	Producer
2022	"Danger"	Olivia Dean	Messy	Writer/Producer
2023	"Dive"	Olivia Dean	Messy	Producer
2023	"Fly Girl" feat. Missy Elliott	FLO	Non-album single	Writer
2023	"Cream Soda"	Exo	Exist	Writer/Producer
2023	"Haunt You"	Anne-Marie	Unhealthy	Writer
2023	"Another Friday Night"	Joel Corry	Another Friday Night	Writer/Producer
2023	"DILF"	Caity Baser	Non-album single	Writer/Producer/Mixer
2024	"Ten (Get Back Up)"	Nathan Dawe & MNEK	Non-album single	Writer/Producer
2024	"Headline"	Kamille	Headline EP	Additional Producer/Mixer
2024	"Freak"	Kamille	Headline EP	Writer/Producer/Mixer
2024	"Losing Sleep"	Tzuyu	abouTZU	Writer/Producer
2024	"Conceited"	FLO	Access All Areas	Writer/Producer/Mixer
2024	"Reset"	IVE	IVE Switch	Writer/Producer
2024	"Touching Heaven" with CamrinWatsin	Jazzy	No Bad Vibes - EP	Writer/Producer
2024	"Tears"	Perrie	Perrie (Deluxe)	Vocal Producer
2024	"Me, Myself & You"	Perrie	Perrie (Deluxe)	Writer/Producer
2024	"Christmas Magic"	Perrie	Non-album single	Writer/Producer
2024	"Forget About Us"	Perrie	Perrie	Vocal Producer
2024	"You Go Your Way"	Perrie	Perrie	Vocal Producer
2025	"Punchline"	Perrie	Perrie	Writer/Producer
2025	"Miss You"	Perrie	Perrie	Writer/Producer
2025	"No Bad Vibes" with Kilimanjaro	Jazzy	No Bad Vibes - EP	Writer/Producer
2025	"Moth to a Flame" with Luuk Van Dijk	Jazzy	Gewah Selects	Writer
2025	"Can't Deny It" with Spriitzz	Jazzy	Non-album single	Writer/Vocal Producer
2025	"Lovers To Enemies"	No Guidnce	Confessions of a Loverboy	Writer/Producer/Mixer
2025	"Last Rodeo"	Kevin Smiley	Non-album single	Writer/Producer
2025	"Borderline"	Louise	Confessions	Writer/Producer
2025	"SOS"	Craig David	Commitment	Writer
2025	"Rain"	Craig David	Commitment	Writer/Producer
2025	"Up In Flames"	Jack Harris	What Overthinking Sounds Like	Writer
2025	"Pretty Liar"	Lost Girl	Non-album single	Writer/Producer
2025	"The Fifth Season"	WayV	Eternal White	Writer/Producer
2026	"Now The Love Is Gone"	220 KID	Yellow Butterflies	Writer/Producer
2026	"MUSCLE MARYS.."	MNEK	BULLDOZER!!	Writer/Producer
2026	"Little Things"	Malou Lovis	Soft Season	Writer/Producer
2026	"Invisible" with Chris Lorenzo	Jazzy	Peace & Patience	Writer
2026	"Get This Started"	Jazzy	Peace & Patience	Writer
2026	"Better Days"	Jazzy	Peace & Patience	Writer/Producer
2026	"Rocket Science"	Jazzy	Peace & Patience	Writer/Producer
2026	"Genuine" with MJ Cole	Jazzy	Peace & Patience	Writer/Producer
2026	"Depart"	Jazzy	Peace & Patience	Writer/Producer
2026	"Elevate" feat. Reggie	Jazzy	Peace & Patience	Writer/Producer

== Awards and nominations ==
Award	Year	Recipient(s) and nominee(s)	Category	Result	Ref.
Amazon Music UK	2020	Lighter	Best Song	Won	
The BRIT Awards	2021	Lighter	Song of the Year	Nominated	
The A&R Awards	2021	Himself	Producer of the Year	Nominated	
The A&R Awards	2022	Himself	Producer of the Year	Nominated	
The A&R Awards	2022	Himself	Songwriter of the Year	Nominated	
The A&R Awards	2023	Himself	Songwriter of the Year	Nominated	
The GRAMMY Awards	2026	FLO - Access All Areas	Best Progressive R&B Album	Nominated	
Amazon Music	2026	Himself	Breakthrough Songwriter	Won	
