= High in the Moment =

2025 EP by Belters Only and Jazzy

EP by Belters Only and Jazzy
- Released: 21 February 2025
- Length: 9:34
- Label: Polydor

Jazzy chronology
No Bad Vibes (2024)	High in the Moment (2025)	GEWAH Selects (2025)

High in the Moment is a collaborative extended play (EP) by Irish electronic collective Belters Only (made up of Conor Bissett and Robert Griffiths) and Irish singer-songwriter and producer Jazzy. It was released on 21 February 2025 and peaked at number 44 on the Irish singles chart.

Upon release, Belters Only said "Our new High in the Moment EP has just been released. We made these tunes years ago with Jazzy during our times in the studio."

== Track listing ==
High in the Moment track listing
No.	Title	Writer(s)	Length
1.	"High in the Moment"	Yasmine Byrne; Conor Bissett; Evan Fields; Robert Griffiths	3:46
2.	"Hanging with the DJ"	Bissett; Griffiths	3:45
3.	"Here to Stay" (with Niels van Gogh)	Byrne; Bissett; Griffiths; Niels Eiterer; Robert Borrmann	4:17

== Charts ==
Weekly chart performance for "High in the Moment"
Chart (2025)	Peak position
Ireland (IRMA)	44
