= The Hardest Part =

The Hardest Part can refer to:

- The Hardest Part (Allison Moorer album), an album by Allison Moorer released in 2000
- The Hardest Part (Noah Cyrus album), an album by Noah Cyrus released in 2022
- "The Hardest Part" (Blondie song), 1980
- "The Hardest Part" (Coldplay song), 2006
- "The Hardest Part" (Olivia Dean song), 2020
- "The Hardest Part", a song by Nina Nesbitt from her 2014 album Peroxide
- "The Hardest Part", a song by Erasure from their 1988 EP Crackers International
