= Constellations (EP) =

EP by Jazzy
- Released: 23 October 2023
- Length: 15:09
- Label: Polydor

Jazzy chronology
Constellations (2023)	No Bad Vibes (2024)

Singles from Constellations
- 1. "Giving Me" Released: 10 March 2023; 2. "Feel It" Released: 21 July 2023; 3. "NRG" Released: 6 October 2023

Singles from Constellations (expanded)
- 1. "Shooting Star" Released: 2 February 2024

Constellations is the debut extended play (EP) by Irish dance pop artist Jazzy. It was released on 23 October 2023 and peaked at number 21 on the Irish albums chart. An expanded edition was released on 2 February 2024.

== Track listing ==
Constellations track listing
No.	Title	Writer(s)	Producer(s)	Length
1.	"Giving Me"	Yasmine Byrne; Conor Bissett; Robert Griffiths	Belters Only; Mark Ralph	2:49
2.	"Feel It" (club edit)	Byrne; Jem Cooke; Daniel Eugene O'Donnell; Hannah Laing	D.O.D.; Hannah Laing	2:04
3.	"Empty Promises" (with Charlotte Plank)	Byrne; Gez O'Donnell; Charlotte Plank; Jordan Riley	Mark Ralph; Jordan Riley	2:23
4.	"NRG"	Byrne; Janee Bennett; Griffiths; Jin Jin; Jacob Manson	Jacob Manson	2:26
5.	"Stardust"	Byrne; Bennett; Jin Jin; Karma Kid; Ralph; Sakima	Kid; Ralph	2:51
6.	"Feeling Tonight"	Byrne; Bissett; Theo Drose; Griffiths; Kareen Lomax; Manson; Gustav Parling; Iman Orths	Belters Only; Manson	2:26
Total length:				15:09

Constellations (expanded) track listing
No.	Title	Writer(s)	Producer(s)	Length
1.	"Shooting Star"	Yasmine Byrne; Conor Bissett; Robert Griffiths; Mark Ralph	Belters Only; Mark Ralph	2:25
2.	"Giving Me"	Byrne; Bissett; Griffiths	Belters Only; Ralph	2:49
3.	"Feel It" (club edit)	Byrne; Jem Cooke; Daniel Eugene O'Donnell; Hannah Laing	D.O.D.; Hannah Laing	2:04
4.	"Empty Promises" (with Charlotte Plank)	Byrne; Gez O'Donnell; Charlotte Plank; Jordan Riley	Mark Ralph; Jordan Riley	2:23
5.	"NRG"	Byrne; Janee Bennett; Griffiths; Jin Jin; Jacob Manson	Jacob Manson	2:26
6.	"Stardust"	Byrne; Bennett; Jin Jin; Karma Kid; Ralph; Sakima	Kid; Ralph	2:51
7.	"Feeling Tonight"	Byrne; Bissett; Theo Drose; Griffiths; Kareen Lomax; Manson; Gustav Parling; Iman Orths	Belters Only; Manson	2:26
8.	"Giving Me" (Symmetrik remix)			2:58
9.	"Feel It" (Jax Jones remix)			2:43
10.	"NRG" (Sonny Wern remix)			2:37
Total length:				25:55

== Charts ==
Chart performance for Constellations
Chart (2023)	Peak position
Irish Albums (IRMA)	21
