= High on Me (Rossi. and Jazzy song) =

2025 single by Rossi. and Jazzy

Single by Rossi. and Jazzy
- Released: 20 June 2025
- Length: 3:09
- Label: Chaos; Polydor
- Songwriters: Rossi.; Yasmine Byrne; Theo Hutchcraft
- Producers: Rossi.; Mark Ralph

Jazzy singles chronology
"Closer to the Floor" (2025)	"High on Me" (2025)	"All This Time" (2025)

"High on Me" is a song by British House DJ and producer Rossi. and Irish singer-songwriter and producer Jazzy. It was released on 20 June 2025.

== Reception ==
Aria Groove from Electronic Groove said "The song's narrative circles the heady rush of new desire, carried by a rolling groove tailored for midsummer playlists."

== Track listing ==
Digital download

1. "High on Me" – 3:09

Digital download

1. "High on Me" (extended) – 4:07
2. "High on Me" – 3:09

Digital download

1. "High on Me" (dub) – 3:54

== Charts ==
=== Weekly charts ===
Weekly chart performance for "High On Me"
Chart (2025)	Peak position
Estonia Airplay (TopHit)	54
Ireland (IRMA)	12
Lithuania Airplay (TopHit)	23
North Macedonia Airplay (Radiomonitor)	1
UK Singles (Official Charts)	18
UK Dance (Official Charts)	4

=== Monthly charts ===
Monthly chart performance for "High on Me"
Chart (2025)	Peak position
Estonia Airplay (TopHit)	74
Lithuania Airplay (TopHit)	26

== Certifications ==
Certifications for "High on Me"
Region	Certification	Certified units/sales
United Kingdom (BPI)	Gold	400,000^{‡}
^{‡} Sales+streaming figures based on certification alone.
