= Giving Me =

Single by Jazzy

from the EP Constellations
- Released: 10 March 2023
- Genre: House
- Length: 2:49
- Label: Polydor
- Songwriters: Conor Bissett; Robert Griffiths; Yasmine Byrne
- Producers: Belters Only; Mark Ralph

Jazzy singles chronology
"Don't Stop Just Yet" (2022)	"Giving Me" (2023)	"Feel It" (2023)

Visualiser
- "Giving Me" on YouTube

"Giving Me" is the debut solo single by Irish singer-songwriter and producer Jazzy. It was released on 10 March 2023 through Polydor.

The work was nominated for the PRS for Music Most Performed Work Ivor Novello Award on 23 May 2024.

== Background ==
My solo debut has been a really long time coming, so we made sure that we edited and tweaked the track until it felt perfect. I’ve been anticipating this moment for some time now and am buzzing to share "Giving Me" with you all.

— Jazzy on writing the record, IMRO

== Composition ==
"Giving Me" was described as a "club-ready slice of Irish house" filled with "steady handclaps" and a "hypnotic delivery" by the singer. Lyrically, the song explores themes of moving on from a past relationship by getting back out in town after a period of healing.

== Commercial performance ==
For the chart dated 19 May 2023, the song topped the Irish Singles Chart, earning the singer her second number-one song following "Make Me Feel Good" (2021) with Belters Only. This achievement made her the first Irish female artist to top the national charts in over 14 years. It spent a total of three weeks atop the chart.

== Track listings ==
Digital download and streaming
No.	Title	Length
1.	"Giving Me"	2:49

Digital download and streaming
No.	Title	Length
1.	"Giving Me" (Chaos re-edit)	2:56

Digital download and streaming
No.	Title	Length
1.	"Giving Me" (Darius Syrossian remix)	3:21

Digital download and streaming
No.	Title	Length
1.	"Giving Me" (Symmetrik remix)	2:58

Digital download and streaming
No.	Title	Length
1.	"Giving Me" (Alchemist remix)	3:12

== Charts ==
=== Weekly charts ===
Weekly chart performance for "Giving Me"
Chart (2023)	Peak position
Estonia Airplay (TopHit)	8
France (Club 40)	10
Ireland (IRMA)	1
Latvia Airplay (LaIPA)	12
Latvia Streaming (LaIPA)	9
Lithuania (AGATA)	11
Netherlands (Single Tip)	30
UK Singles (OCC)	3
UK Dance (OCC)	2
US Dance/Mix Show Airplay (Billboard)	21

=== Monthly charts ===
Monthly chart performance for "Giving Me"
Chart (2023)	Peak position
Estonia Airplay (TopHit)	18
Lithuania Airplay (TopHit)	24

=== Year-end charts ===
2023 year-end chart performance for "Giving Me"
Chart (2023)	Position
Estonia Airplay (TopHit)	165
Lithuania Airplay (TopHit)	30
UK Singles (OCC)	28

== Certifications ==
Certifications for "Giving Me"
Region	Certification	Certified units/sales
Ireland (IRMA)	10× Platinum	150,000^{^}
United Kingdom (BPI)	2× Platinum	1,200,000^{‡}
^{^} Shipments figures based on certification alone.^{‡} Sales+streaming figures based on certification alone.
