= No Bad Vibes =

Single by Jazzy featuring Kilimanjaro

from the album No Bad Vibes
- Released: 18 October 2024
- Length: 2:42
- Label: Chaos, Universal
- Songwriters: Yasmine Byrne; Ines Dunn; Tre Jean-Marie; Jay Gilbert; Josh Kamunu Liandu; Nathan Nicholson; Mark Ralph
- Producers: Tre Jean-Marie; Jay Gilbert; Kilimanjaro; Mark Ralph

Jazzy singles chronology
"The Heat" (2024)	"No Bad Vibes" (2024)	"Closer to the Floor" (2025)

Music video
- "No Bad Vibes" on YouTube

"No Bad Vibes" is a song by Irish singer Jazzy featuring Kilimanjaro. The song was released on 18 October 2024 as the third single from Jazzy's second EP of the same name.

== Track listing ==
Digital download and streaming
No.	Title	Length
1.	"No Bad Vibes"	2:42

Digital download and streaming
No.	Title	Length
1.	"No Bad Vibes" (extended)	5:25
2.	"No Bad Vibes"	2:42

Digital download and streaming
No.	Title	Length
1.	"No Bad Vibes" (Gewah edit)	2:36
2.	"No Bad Vibes"	2:42

Digital download and streaming
No.	Title	Length
1.	"No Bad Vibes" (featuring Jayda G)	2:42
2.	"No Bad Vibes"	2:42

Digital download and streaming
No.	Title	Length
1.	"No Bad Vibes" (featuring Gyakie and Joshua Baraka)	2:42
2.	"No Bad Vibes"	2:42

Digital download and streaming
No.	Title	Length
1.	"No Bad Vibes" (Blair Muir remix)	2:45
2.	"No Bad Vibes"	2:42

Digital download and streaming
No.	Title	Length
1.	"No Bad Vibes" (Joe Hunt remix)	3:21
2.	"No Bad Vibes"	2:42

Digital download and streaming
No.	Title	Length
1.	"No Bad Vibes" (Woodcamp remix)	3:18
2.	"No Bad Vibes"	2:42

Digital download and streaming
No.	Title	Length
1.	"No Bad Vibes" (Virgo Deep remix)	5:27
2.	"No Bad Vibes"	2:42

Digital download and streaming
No.	Title	Length
1.	"No Bad Vibes" (Denon Reed remix)	2:44
2.	"No Bad Vibes"	2:42

Digital download and streaming
No.	Title	Length
1.	"No Bad Vibes" (Eriice remix)	2:44
2.	"No Bad Vibes"	2:42

Digital download and streaming
No.	Title	Length
1.	"No Bad Vibes" (Philip George remix)	6:08
2.	"No Bad Vibes"	2:42

== Charts ==
=== Weekly charts ===
Weekly chart performance for "No Bad Vibes"
Chart (2024–2026)	Peak position
Ireland (IRMA)	82
Greece International (IFPI)	24
Latvia Airplay (TopHit)	1
Lithuania Airplay (TopHit)	36
Romania Airplay (TopHit)	188
UK Singles (Official Charts)	50
UK Dance (Official Charts)	12

=== Monthly charts ===
Monthly chart performance for "No Bad Vibes"
Chart (2024–2025)	Peak position
Latvia Airplay (TopHit)	12
Lithuania Airplay (TopHit)	46

=== Year-end charts ===
Year-end chart performance
Chart (2025)	Position
Latvia Airplay (TopHit)	34

== Certifications ==
Region	Certification	Certified units/sales
Brazil (Pro-Música Brasil)	Platinum	40,000^{‡}
United Kingdom (BPI)	Gold	400,000^{‡}
Streaming
Greece (IFPI Greece)	Platinum	2,000,000^{†}
^{‡} Sales+streaming figures based on certification alone.^{†} Streaming-only figures based on certification alone.
