= Don't Stop Just Yet =

2022 single by Belters Only and Jazzy

Single by Belters Only featuring Jazzy

from the album 2022 Only
- Released: 25 March 2022
- Length: 3:06
- Label: Polydor
- Songwriter(s): Skye Edwards; Paul David Godfrey; Ross Godfrey
- Producer(s): Belters Only

Jazzy singles chronology
"Make Me Feel Good" (2021)	"Don't Stop Just Yet" (2022)	"Giving Me" (2023)

Performance video
- "Don't Stop Just Yet" on YouTube

"Don't Stop Just Yet" is a song by Irish electronic collective Belters Only featuring vocals by Jazzy. It was the duo's second collaboration and released on 25 March 2022, via Polydor Records.

The song reached number 15 in Ireland and number 84 in the United Kingdom.

== Track listings ==
Digital download and streaming
No.	Title	Length
1.	"Don't Stop Just Yet"	3:06

Digital download and streaming
No.	Title	Length
1.	"Don't Stop Just Yet" (VIP)	2:50

== Charts ==
Chart performance for "Don't Stop Just Yet"
Chart (2022)	Peak position
Ireland (IRMA)	15
UK Singles (OCC)	84
UK Dance (OCC)	28

== Certifications ==
Region	Certification	Certified units/sales
United Kingdom (BPI)	Silver	200,000^{‡}
^{‡} Sales+streaming figures based on certification alone.
