= Peace & Patience =

Studio album by Jazzy
- Released: 23 October 2026
- Length: 36:20
- Label: Universal
- Producers: Guillarme Alric; Neave Applebaum; Axtro; Belters Only; Jaasu; Jazzy; Tre Jean-Marie; Late Nine; Chris Lorenzo; Maey; MJ Cole; Dave Nunes; Mark Ralph; Saoirse; Shizzi

Jazzy chronology
Gewah Selects (2025)	Peace & Patience (2026)

Singles from Peace & Patience
- 1. "Invisible" Released: 19 June 2026; 2. "My People" Released: 7 August 2026; 3. "Get This Started" Released: 18 September 2026; 4. "Rocket Science" Released: 16 October 2026

Peace & Patience is the debut studio album by the Irish singer Jazzy, released on 23 October 2026 through Universal Music. It was announced in June 2026 alongside the release of the lead single, "Invisible".

Upon announcement, Jazzy said: "This album is everything I've been building toward. It's about where I come from, the people who have held me down and the patience it took to finally find my peace and my sound. Getting to create this between Dublin, London and LA with producers and writers I've admired for years has been a dream."

The album will be supported with a headline concert at 3Arena in Dublin on 24 October; the biggest concert of her career with a 13,000 people capacity.

== Track listing ==
Peace & Patience track listing
No.	Title	Writer(s)	Producer(s)	Length
1.	"Intro"	Yasmine Byrne; Theo Hutchcraft; Mark Ralph; Guillaume Alric	Ralph; Alric	1:10
2.	"My People"	Byrne; Hutchcraft; Ralph; Alric	Jazzy; Ralph; Alric	2:44
3.	"Better Days"	Byrne; Camille Purcell; Tre Jean-Marie; Ralph	Ralph; Jean-Marie	2:22
4.	"Depart"	Byrne; Jean-Marie; Ralph; Saoirse Ryan	Ralph; Jean-Marie; Saoirse	3:08
5.	"Genuine" (with MJ Cole)	Byrne; Hutchcraft; Jean-Marie; Ralph; MJ Cole	Ralph; Jean-Marie; MJ Cole	2:04
6.	"Playin"	Byrne; Hutchcraft; Ed Thomas; Ralph	Ralph	3:35
7.	"Peace & Patience"	Byrne; Ines Dunn; Ralph; Neave Applebaum	Ralph; Applebaum	3:29
8.	"Fantasy"	Byrne; Dunn; Hutchcraft; Jean-Marie; Ralph; Dave Nunes; Marith van Beek; James Essien	Nunes; Maey	3:18
9.	"Rocket Science"	Byrne; Soaky Siren; Jean-Marie; Ralph; Shizzi	Ralph; Jean-Marie; Shizzi; Late Nine; Axtro	3:00
10.	"Get This Started"	Byrne; Lily Mackenzie; Jean-Marie; Applebaum	Ralph; Applebaum	2:39
11.	"Invisible" (with Chris Lorenzo)	Byrne; Taet; Hutchcraft; Jean-Marie; Ralph; Lorenzo	Lorenzo; Ralph; Applebaum	3:17
12.	"Elevate" (with Jaasu and Reggie)	Byrne; Talay Riley; Jean-Marie; Ralph; Jaasu Mallory; Reginald John	Ralph; Jean-Marie; Jaasu	2:01
13.	"Funky Flow" (with Belters Only)	Byrne; Ralph; Conor Bissett; Jane Griffiths	Belters Only; Ralph	3:33
Total length:				36:20

== Personnel ==
Credits are adapted from Tidal.

- Yasmine Byrne – vocals
- Mark Ralph – mixing, immersive mixing (tracks 1–10, 12, 13); keyboards, programming (1–7, 9–13); mastering (1, 12)
- Matt Colton – mastering (2–10, 13)
- Guillaume Alric – programming (2)
- Tre Jean-Marie – keyboards, programming (3–5, 9)
- Sam Harper – background vocals (3)
- Saoirse – keyboards, programming (4)
- MJ Cole – drum programming, piano, Rhodes (5)
- Ed Thomas – synthesizer (6)
- Neave Applebaum – keyboards, programming (7, 10, 11)
- Dave Nunes – keyboards, programming (8)
- Maey – programming (8)
- Shizzi – keyboards, programming (9)
- Axtro – programming (9)
- Chris Lorenzo – programming (11)
- Kevin Grainger – mixing, mastering (11)
- Jhj – immersive mixing (11)
- Jaasu – keyboards, programming (12)
- Reggie – vocals (12)
- Betters Only – keyboards, programming (13)

== Charts ==
Chart performance for Peace & Patience
Chart (2026)	Peak position
Irish Albums (Official Charts)	18
UK Album Downloads (Official Charts)	59
UK Dance Albums (Official Charts)	1
