= Feel It (Jazzy song) =

Single by Jazzy

from the EP Constellations
- Released: 21 July 2023
- Length: 2:04
- Label: Chaos; Polydor
- Songwriter(s): Yasmine Byrne; Jem Cooke; Daniel Eugene O'Donnell; Hannah Laing
- Producer(s): D.O.D.; Hannah Laing

Jazzy singles chronology
"Giving Me" (2023)	"Feel It" (2023)	"NRG" (2023)

"Feel It" is a song by Irish singer-songwriter and producer Jazzy. It was released in July 2023 as the second single from her debut extended play, Constellations.

== Reception ==
Kate Brayden from Hot Press said "The feel-good anthem is destined to uplift clubbers and festival-goers around the world with fiercely high-energy production."

== Track listings ==
Digital download and streaming
No.	Title	Length
1.	"Feel It" (club edit)	2:04

Remixes - Digital download and streaming
No.	Title	Length
1.	"Feel It" (testpress remix)	2:53
2.	"Feel It" (Jess Bays remix)	2:54
3.	"Feel It" (Morgan Seatree remix)	2:37
4.	"Feel It" (1991 remix)	2:59
5.	"Feel It" (Daire remix)	2:01

Digital download and streaming
No.	Title	Length
1.	"Feel It" (Jax Jones remix)	2:43

== Charts ==
=== Weekly charts ===
Weekly chart performance for "Feel It"
Chart (2023)	Peak position
Ireland (IRMA)	22
UK Singles (OCC)	35
UK Dance (OCC)	21

== Certifications ==
Certifications for "Feel It"
Region	Certification	Certified units/sales
United Kingdom (BPI)	Silver	200,000^{‡}
^{‡} Sales+streaming figures based on certification alone.
