= When I Have Fears (album) =

Studio album by the Murder Capital
- Released: 16 August 2019
- Recorded: 2018–2019
- Genres: Post-punk, crank wave
- Length: 44:02
- Label: Human Season
- Producer: Flood

The Murder Capital chronology
When I Have Fears (2019)	Gigi's Recovery (2023)

Singles from When I Have Fears
- 1. "Feeling Fades" Released: 11 January 2019; 2. "Green & Blue" Released: 25 April 2019; 3. "Don't Cling to Life" Released: 9 July 2019; 4. "More Is Less" Released: 13 August 2019

When I Have Fears is the debut studio album by Irish post-punk band, the Murder Capital. The album was released on 16 August 2019 through Human Season Records.

== Critical reception ==
Professional ratings
Aggregate scores
Source	Rating
Album of the Year	86/100
AnyDecentMusic?	8.2/10
Metacritic	82/100
Review scores
Source	Rating
Clash	8/10
DIY	4.5/5 stars
Dork	4/5 stars
The Guardian	5/5 stars
The Irish Times	5/5 stars
Loud and Quiet	9/10
Mojo	3/5 stars
NME	4/5 stars
Q	4/5 stars
Uncut	4/5 stars

Upon its release, When I Have Fears received acclaim from contemporary music critics. On review aggregation websites Metacritic and AnyDecentMusic?, When I Have Fears has an average weighted rating of 82 out of 100 based on eight critic reviews. On review aggregation website Album of the Year, When I Have Fears has an average rating of 87 out of 100 based on 11 ratings.

== Track listing ==
All music is composed by James McGovern, Damien Tuit, Cathal Roper, Gabriel Paschal Blake, and Diarmuid Brennan.

No.	Title	Length
1.	"For Everything"	5:14
2.	"More Is Less"	2:55
3.	"Green & Blue"	6:16
4.	"Slowdance I"	4:01
5.	"Slowdance II"	3:15
6.	"On Twisted Ground"	6:10
7.	"Feeling Fades"	4:10
8.	"Don't Cling To Life"	2:27
9.	"How the Streets Adore Me Now"	4:39
10.	"Love, Love, Love"	4:55
Total length:		44:02

== Charts ==
Chart (2019)	Peak position
Belgian Albums (Ultratop Flanders)	198
Belgian Albums (Ultratop Wallonia)	165
French Albums (SNEP)	146
Irish Albums (IRMA)	2
Scottish Albums (Official Charts)	12
UK Albums (Official Charts)	18
