= Messy (album) =

Studio album by Olivia Dean
- Released: 30 June 2023
- Genres: Pop-soul; neo-soul
- Length: 35:28
- Label: EMI
- Producers: DetoNate; Matt Hales; Tre Jean-Marie; Felix Joseph; Bastian Langebæk; Aston Rudi; Max Wolfgang

Olivia Dean chronology
| Live at the Jazz Café (2021) | Messy (2023) | The Art of Loving (2025) |

Singles from Messy
- 1. "Danger" Released: 18 October 2022; 2. "UFO" Released: 31 January 2023; 3. "Dive" Released: 28 March 2023; 4. "Carmen" Released: 26 May 2023; 5. "Ladies Room" Released: 29 September 2023; 6. "Dangerously Easy" Released: 24 January 2024

Messy is the debut studio album by British singer Olivia Dean. The album was released on 30 June 2023 through EMI. It peaked at number four on the UK Albums Chart, and is certified gold by the BPI. In 2023, it was shortlisted for the Mercury Prize.

== Background and composition ==
After the publication of four EPs through EMI Records, Dean started working on her first full-length studio album with several producers and songwriters, including Matt Helders, Tre Jean-Marie, Bastian Langebæk, Max Wolfgang, Matt Colton and Italian musician Davide Rossi. The singer told that she was inspired by neo soul, contemporary R&B and Motown music. In an interview with Dork, Dean explained that the record project was dedicated to her grandmother and the Windrush generation:

"I knew quite early on that I wanted the whole album to be dedicated to her. I was thinking about the reason I'm able to be where I am and signed to a label and living in London and making an album like this is that when my granny was 18, four years younger than I am now, she just changed her whole life. [...] I always wanted it to be an album in the sense that it was two halves. I wanted it to feel varied. I wanted it to be fun. I wanted there to be songs that would be fun to do live and that people could dance to, but also, when you're living in your bed on your pillow crying, I'm there. There are no rules. You could just play around with stuff. In the second half, I really allowed myself to go there."

== Title ==
In an interview with Forbes, Dean also revealed that the album was initially going to be called Between Islands, referring to an exhibition at the Tate in London about the wind turbine generator. In an interview with Dork, the singer explained that she chose the word Messy as the title in connection with the one chosen for her previous EP, Growth, stating:

"My last project was called Growth, so people are going to want to know what I've grown into. [...] Then suddenly I was like: I don't know. I think [the word] messy is a fab title because, if people listen to it and say it doesn't sound cohesive, well, duh? Because it's not. Well, it is, and it isn't, but life is just messy, and people are messy, and that's great. That's what makes things cool!"

== Critical reception ==
Professional ratings
Aggregate scores
| Source | Rating |
|---|---|
| Metacritic | 77/100 |
Review scores
| Source | Rating |
| AllMusic | 3.5/5 stars |
| Clash | 8/10 |
| DIY | 3/5 stars |
| The Guardian | 3/5 stars |
| The Line of Best Fit | 9/10 |
| NME | 4/5 stars |

Upon release, Messy received positive reviews from music critics. The album holds a score of 77 out of 100 on review aggregator Metacritic based on seven critics' reviews, indicating "generally favorable" reception.

Sophie Williams of NME rated the album 4 out of 5 stars, complementing Dean's "confidence to occasionally dissect subjects that others swerve" while keeping a "mainstream" appeal. Writing for The Line of Best Fit, Izzy Sigston deemed the singer as "the master of versatility", and commended the wide range of the album. Alim Kheraj of The Guardian was a little critical of the album, hoping that "Dean will relinquish the tired neo-soul fodder to pursue the experimentation she's clearly capable of". However, Robin Murray of Clash called the album "a bold, impressive debut offering" while commending the album's "broad range" and "precise execution".

== Commercial performance ==
In the United Kingdom Messy debuted at number four on the Official Albums Chart, becoming Dean's first record to chart.

== Track listing ==
Messy track listing
| No. | Title | Writer(s) | Producer(s) | Length |
|---|---|---|---|---|
| 1. | "UFO" | Olivia Dean; Matt Hales | Hales | 2:34 |
| 2. | "Dive" | Dean; Bastian Langebæk; Max Wolfgang | Hales; Langebæk; Tre Jean-Marie; Joseph Hartwell Jones^{[v]} | 3:20 |
| 3. | "Ladies Room" | Dean; Britten Newbill; Aston Rudi | Hales; Rudi | 3:40 |
| 4. | "No Man" | Dean; DetoNate; Hales; Tekiva Ledwidge; Andrew Sarlo; Sinai Tedros | Hales | 2:59 |
| 5. | "Dangerously Easy" | Dean; Hales | Hales | 2:43 |
| 6. | "Getting There (Interlude)" | Dean; Deschanel Gordon; Hales; Taran Martino; Joel Waters; Finn Zeferino-Birchall | Hales | 1:46 |
| 7. | "Danger" | Dean; Ledwidge; Jean-Marie; Ilsey Juber | DetoNate; Jean-Marie | 2:55 |
| 8. | "The Hardest Part" | Dean; Langebæk; Wolfgang | Langebæk; Felix Joseph^{[a]}; Cameron Gower Poole^{[v]} | 2:56 |
| 9. | "I Could Be a Florist" | Dean; Langebæk; Newbill; Wolfgang | Wolfgang | 1:21 |
| 10. | "Messy" | Dean; Hales; Sarlo | Hales | 3:43 |
| 11. | "Everybody's Crazy" | Dean; Joseph | Joseph | 2:43 |
| 12. | "Carmen" | Dean; Hales | Hales | 4:48 |
| Total length: | | | | 35:28 |

Notes

- ^{^[a]} signifies an additional producer.
- ^{^[v]} signifies a vocal producer.

== Personnel ==
Musicians

- Olivia Dean – vocals (all tracks), percussion (tracks 2–6, 10, 12), piano (9)
- Matt Hales – programming (1, 3–6, 10, 12), piano (1, 4–6, 10, 12), keyboards (1, 4–6, 12), guitar (1), vocal programming (3); Moog bass, synthesizer (10)
- Taran Stormes Martino – acoustic guitar (1), guitar (2–6, 10, 12)
- Finn Zeferino-Birchall – bass guitar (1–6, 10, 12)
- Kaidi Akinnibi – baritone saxophone, tenor saxophone (2, 3, 12)
- Max Wolfgang – bass guitar (2, 8); piano, percussion (2, 9); guitar, keyboards, synthesizer (9)
- Dan See – drums (2, 4, 8, 10, 12), percussion (2, 3, 10, 12), timpani (4)
- Tre Jean-Marie – keyboards, programming (2, 7); bass guitar, drums, horns, keyboards, synthesizer (7)
- Joel Waters – percussion (2), drums (3, 5, 6)
- Deschanel Gordon – Rhodes (2), keyboards (3), organ (4–6, 12)
- Elias Jordan Atkinson – trumpet (2, 3, 12), flugelhorn (10)
- James Wade-Sired – trombone (2, 3, 12)
- Davide Rossi – strings, string arrangement (4)
- DetoNate – bass guitar, drums, horns, keyboards, programming, synthesizer (7)
- Bastian Langebæk – keyboards (8)
- Felix Joseph – programming (8)
- Huw Foster – bass guitar (11)
- Russell Ramesh Roberts – percussion (12)

Technical

- Matt Colton – mastering
- Nathan Boddy – mixing (1, 4–12)
- Manon Grandjean – mixing (2, 3)
- Daniel Moyler – engineering (1–6, 10, 12)
- Matt Hales – engineering (2–6, 10, 12
- Bastian Langebæk – engineering (2, 8)
- Tre Jean-Marie – engineering (2, 7)
- Felix Joseph – engineering (8, 11)
- Max Wolfgang – engineering (9)
- James Pinfield-Wells – engineering assistance (1–6, 10, 12)
- Andrew Sarlo – additional engineering (10)

Visuals

- Olivia Dean – creative direction, photography, design
- Emily Braham – creative direction, design
- Rory Dewar – design
- Felix Joseph – photography
- Danl KM – photography
- Petros Studio – photography
- Emily Anderson – illustration

== Charts ==
Chart performance for Messy
| Chart (2023–2026) | Peak position |
|---|---|
| Australian On Replay Albums (ARIA) | 20 |
| Belgian Albums (Ultratop Flanders) | 44 |
| Danish Albums (Hitlisten) | 32 |
| Dutch Albums (Album Top 100) | 17 |
| French Albums (SNEP) | 191 |
| Greek Albums (IFPI) | 22 |
| Irish Albums (Official Charts) | 11 |
| Norwegian Albums (IFPI Norge) | 32 |
| Portuguese Albums (AFP) | 149 |
| Scottish Albums (Official Charts) | 10 |
| Swedish Albums (Sverigetopplistan) | 53 |
| Swiss Albums (Schweizer Hitparade) | 23 |
| UK Albums (Official Charts) | 4 |
| US Billboard 200 | 137 |

== Certifications ==
Certifications for Messy
| Region | Certification | Certified units/sales |
|---|---|---|
| Canada (Music Canada) | Gold | 40,000^{‡} |
| New Zealand (RMNZ) | Platinum | 15,000^{‡} |
| United Kingdom (BPI) | Gold | 100,000^{‡} |
^{‡} Sales+streaming figures based on certification alone.

== Release history ==
Release dates and formats for Messy
| Region | Date | Format(s) | Label | Ref. |
|---|---|---|---|---|
| Various | 30 June 2023 | Cassette; CD; digital download; LP; streaming | EMI | |
