= The Murder Capital =

Irish indie rock band

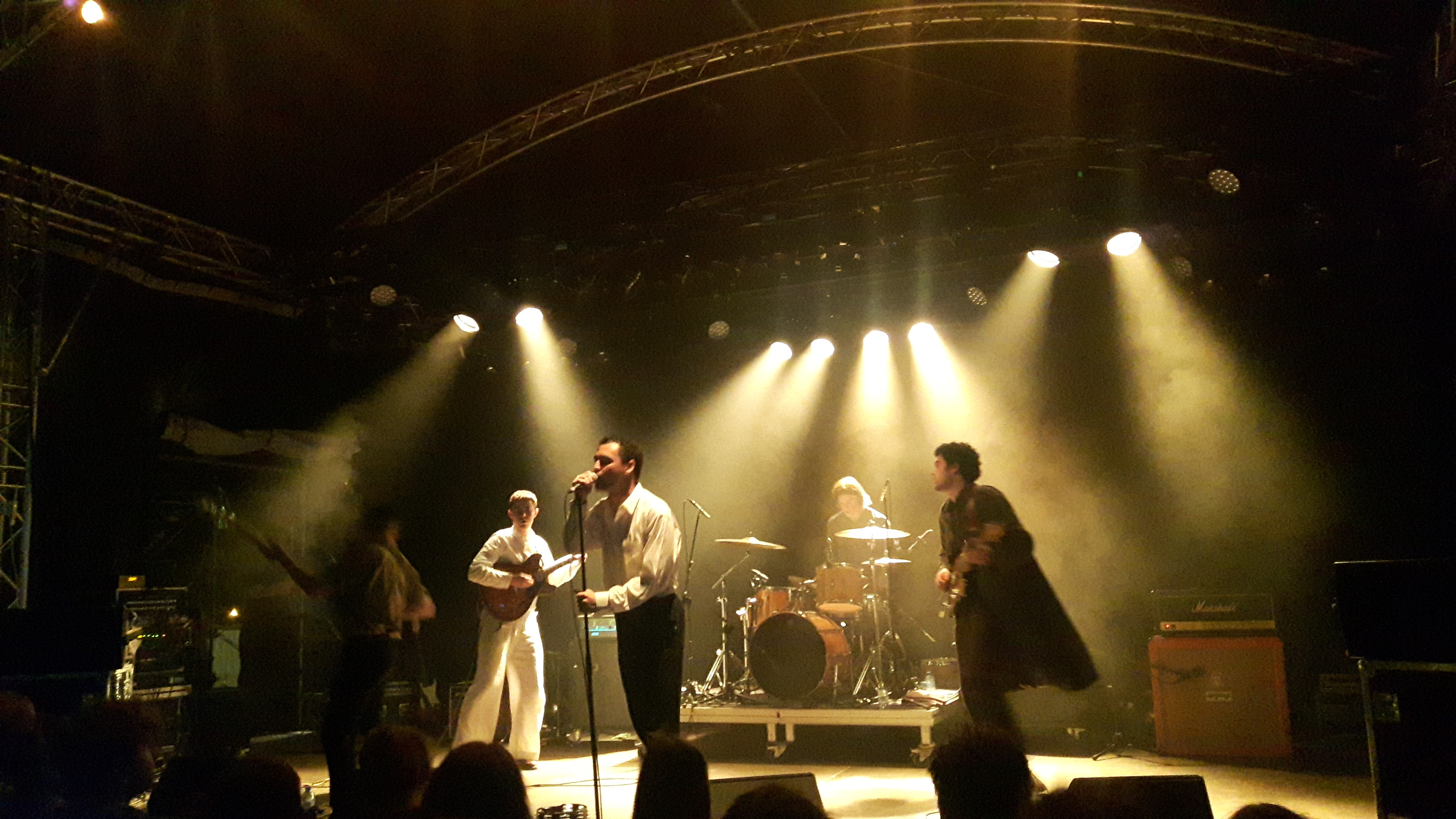
- The Murder Capital at the Valkhof Festival 2019

Background information
- Origin: Dublin, Ireland
- Genres: Post-punk; post-punk revival; indie rock
- Years active: 2018–present
- Label: Human Season
- Members: James McGovern; Damien Tuit; Cathal Roper; Gabriel Paschal Blake; Diarmuid Brennan
- Past members: Matt Wilson; Morgan Wilson
- Website: themurdercapital.com

The Murder Capital are an Irish post-punk band formed in Dublin in 2018. The band's music has been described as dark, intense, and introspective, with a focus on themes of vulnerability, self-reflection, and emotional turmoil. The band members are James McGovern (vocals), Damien Tuit (guitar), Cathal Roper (guitar), Gabriel Paschal Blake (bass), and Diarmuid Brennan (drums).

== History ==
The band began performing together in 2017 and set up their own label, Human Season Records, in 2018 before releasing their debut single the following year.

On 16 August 2019, The Murder Capital released their debut studio album, When I Have Fears, produced by British audio engineer and record producer, Flood. The album was met with widespread critical acclaim. In autumn 2019, the band performed a sold-out tour across the UK and Europe to promote the album.

The Murder Capital performed at the 22nd Coachella Festival in April 2023.

== Musical style ==
The band has been actively compared to several post-punk and art punk bands to arise out of Ireland and the United Kingdom over the late 2010s, such as Idles, Soft Play (formerly known as Slaves), Shame, and fellow Irish band Fontaines D.C., primarily as a result of touring with these bands.

Writing for The Guardian, Damien Morris described the band as "reaching back to Joy Division’s drum tattoos, interlocking with surging, wave-break bass. Pixies' quiet-loud-quiet trick is in there, as are Shame and Savages, while PJ Harvey and the Bad Seeds infest tracks such as Green and Blue."

In describing the themes of their music, the band told DIY magazine: "It just feels like there are loads of fuckin' hotels going up over Dublin, where there could be new housing," James hammers home. "There are cranes all over the city. There's one on George's Street right now, and they're gutting this beautiful Georgian building, and I stopped and asked the builder what it was gonna be, and it's turning into a fuckin' Premier Inn." The band further said, "the hotels are only a side-note to the homelessness, the suicide, the mental health issues. The lack of services available to people who aren't from even middle class backgrounds," he continues. "We just wanna talk about it as much as possible, and make sure that the government knows that we're not happy with the standard of where it's at. People have real issues in their lives, and they need somewhere to go and talk about these things beyond their friends and families. It feels like there's no excuses."

The band released their third studio album Blindness in February 2025. In an interview with Louis Chilton for The Independent, McGovern and Tuit describe the themes of their new album as being about “obsession, deceit, and rejection of faith, about patriotism and its distortions… what binds all these human experiences is that there’s a blindness to so much of it. That’s where the title was spawned from.”

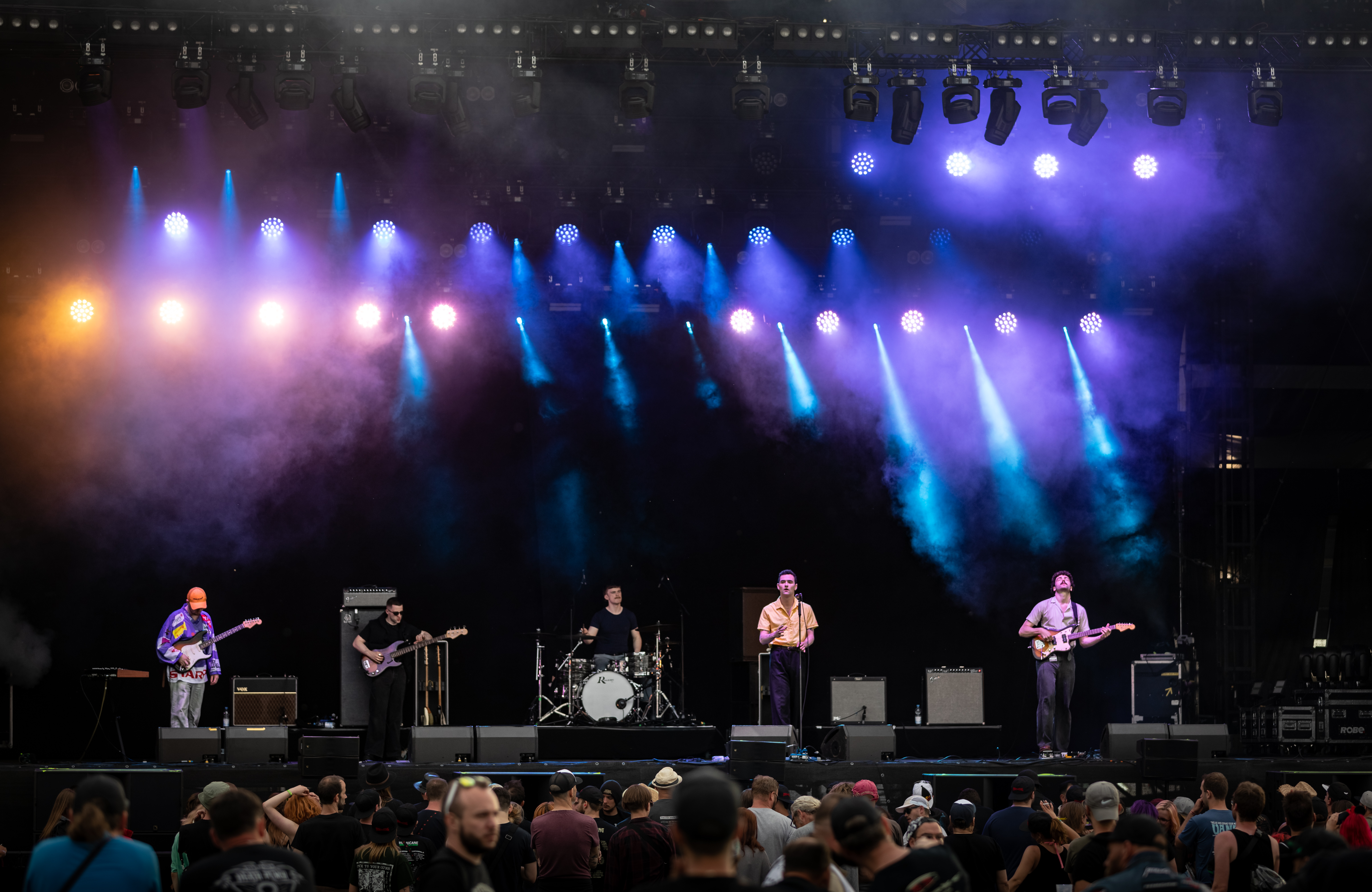
The Murder Capital live @Rock am Ring 2022

== Personnel ==
=== Current members ===
- James McGovern – vocals
- Damien Tuit – guitars
- Cathal Roper – guitars
- Gabriel Paschal Blake – bass
- Diarmuid Brennan – drums

=== Past members ===
- Matt Wilson
- Morgan Wilson

== Discography ==
=== Studio albums ===
Title	Details	Peak chart positions	
Title	Details	IRE	UK
When I Have Fears	Released: 16 August 2019; Label: Human Season; Format: CD, digital download, streaming, vinyl	2	18
Gigi's Recovery	Released: 20 January 2023; Label: Human Season; Format: CD, digital download, streaming, vinyl	1	16
Blindness	Released: 21 February 2025; Label: Human Season; Format: CD, digital download, streaming, vinyl	7	31

=== Singles ===
Title	Details	Album
"Feeling Fades"	Released: 11 January 2019	When I Have Fears
"Green & Blue"	Released: 25 April 2019	When I Have Fears
"More Is Less"	Released: 13 August 2019	When I Have Fears
"Don't Cling to Life"	Released: 21 August 2019	When I Have Fears
"Only Good Things"	Released: 20 July 2022	Gigi's Recovery
"A Thousand Lives"	Released: 23 September 2022	Gigi's Recovery
"Ethel"	Released: 17 November 2022	Gigi's Recovery
"Return My Head"	Released: 5 January 2023	Gigi's Recovery
"Heart In the Hole"	Released: 27 September 2023	Non-album single
"Can't Pretend to Know"	Released: 23 September 2024	Blindness
"Words Lost Meaning"	Released: 18 November 2024	Blindness
"The Fall"	Released: 24 January 2025	Blindness
"A Distant Life"	Released: 17 February 2025	Blindness
"Love of Country"	Released: 21 February 2025; Format: 7”	Blindness
