= Dive (Olivia Dean song) =

2023 single by Olivia Dean

Single by Olivia Dean

from the album Messy
- Released: 28 March 2023
- Genre: Neo-soul; pop
- Length: 3:20
- Label: EMI
- Songwriters: Olivia Dean; Bastian Langebæk; Max Wolfgang
- Producers: Tre Jean-Marie; Matt Hales; Bastian Langebaek

Olivia Dean singles chronology
"UFO" (2023)	"Dive" (2023)	"Carmen" (2023)

"Dive" is a song by English singer-songwriter Olivia Dean, released on 28 March 2023 as the third single from her debut studio album, Messy. It was sent to Italian radio on 17 May 2023. It reached number 17 on the UK singles chart in August 2025 with 11,610 weekly sales.

== Composition ==
The song, writtren by Dean herself with Bastian Langebæk and Max Wolfgang and produced by Langebæk with Tre Jean-Marie and Matt Hales, has alt pop, neo soul and contemporary R&B sounds. In an interview for Genius Dean explained the meaning of the song and its writing process:

"This song is just one of those honest songs. It's really pure and from the heart and I think people like to fall in love you know even though they say they don't. I was listening to Diana Ross. I was listening to The Supremes. I'm very like a Motown head. I think I went through a phase of writing a lot of quite sad breakup music and I was like I want to write something light. I was falling in love which is, you know, crazy. But a nice feeling and it's just really changed my mindset. I think I'm happier because of it."

== Critical reception ==
The song received general positive reviews, which appreciated the sound prodiction and music reference to Motown. Alim Kheraj of The Guardian explained that the song is one of the examples that give the album its "vintage" sound with "horns, shuffling 60s rhythms and artificial vinyl crackling" and "its innocuous Motown stylings". Robin Murray of Clash wrote that the song has "Baroque feel, it’s Dilla-esque slumped beat aligned to some lush piano flourishes". Reviewing the album for The Line of Best Fit, Izzy Sigston defined the song "euphoric" in which Dean sings about "the freedom of falling in love".

== Music video ==
The music video was filmed in Hastings and directed by Candice Lo.

== Track listings ==
Digital single

1. "Dive" – 3:20

Digital single

1. "Dive" (acoustic) – 3:20
2. "Dive" – 3:20

== Charts ==
Chart performance for "Dive"
Chart (2023)	Peak position
Lithuania Airplay (TopHit)	86

Chart performance for "Dive"
Chart (2025–2026)	Peak position
Australia On Replay Singles (ARIA)	4
Global 200 (Billboard)	109
Ireland (IRMA)	41
Netherlands (Single Top 100)	68
New Zealand Catalogue Singles (RMNZ)	6
Philippines Hot 100 (Billboard Philippines)	50
Portugal (AFP)	174
Sweden Heatseeker (Sverigetopplistan)	1
UK Singles (Official Charts)	17

== Certifications ==
Certifications for "Dive"
Region	Certification	Certified units/sales
Australia (ARIA)	Platinum	70,000^{‡}
Canada (Music Canada)	Gold	40,000^{‡}
Denmark (IFPI Danmark)	Gold	45,000^{‡}
France (SNEP)	Gold	100,000^{‡}
New Zealand (RMNZ)	2× Platinum	60,000^{‡}
Portugal (AFP)	Gold	12,000^{‡}
United Kingdom (BPI)	Platinum	600,000^{‡}
United States (RIAA)	Gold	500,000^{‡}
^{‡} Sales+streaming figures based on certification alone.
