= Gigi's Recovery =

Studio album by the Murder Capital
- Released: 20 January 2023
- Length: 45:15
- Label: Human Season
- Producer: John Congleton

The Murder Capital chronology
When I Have Fears (2019)	Gigi's Recovery (2023)	Blindness (2025)

Professional ratings
Aggregate scores
Source	Rating
AnyDecentMusic?	8.4/10
Metacritic	85/100
Review scores
Source	Rating
DIY	4/5 stars
The Line of Best Fit	9/10
musicOMH	4/5 stars
NME	4/5 stars
The Observer	5/5 stars

Gigi's Recovery is the second studio album by Irish post-punk band the Murder Capital. The album was released via the band's own record label, Human Season Records, on 20 January 2023.

== Singles ==
The lead single, "Only Good Things", was released on 20 July 2022. Three more singles, "A Thousand Lives", "Ethel", and "Return My Head", were also released in the lead up to the album's release.

== Critical reception ==
Gigi's Recovery received a score of 85 out of 100 based on 11 critics' reviews on review aggregator Metacritic, indicating "universal acclaim".

== Track listing ==
Gigi's Recovery track listing
No.	Title	Length
1.	"Existence"	1:05
2.	"Crying"	5:12
3.	"Return My Head"	2:45
4.	"Ethel"	4:29
5.	"The Stars Will Leave Their Stage"	4:40
6.	"Belonging"	3:20
7.	"The Lie Becomes the Self"	5:04
8.	"A Thousand Lives"	4:14
9.	"We Had to Disappear"	3:52
10.	"Only Good Things"	3:15
11.	"Gigi's Recovery"	5:51
12.	"Exist"	1:28
Total length:		45:15

== Personnel ==
- John Congleton – production, mixing
- Bernie Grundman – mastering
- Anthony Cazade – engineering
- Sammy Borst – engineering assistance
- Peter Doyle – artwork
- Aidan Cochrane – design
- Ashley Willerton – lettering

== Charts ==
Chart performance for Gigi's Recovery
Chart (2023)	Peak position
Belgian Albums (Ultratop Flanders)	106
Belgian Albums (Ultratop Wallonia)	78
German Albums (Offizielle Top 100)	90
Irish Albums (OCC)	1
Scottish Albums (OCC)	4
UK Albums (OCC)	16
UK Independent Albums (OCC)	3
