= Make Me Feel Good =

2021 single by Belters Only and Jazzy

Single by Belters Only featuring Jazzy

from the album 2022 Only
- Released: 26 November 2021
- Studio: Jungle Beam Studio
- Length: 3:17
- Label: Polydor
- Songwriters: Lynn Lockamy; Conor Bissett; Yasmine Byrne
- Producer: Belters Only

Belters Only and Jazzy singles chronology
"Make Me Feel Good" (2021)	"Don't Stop Just Yet" (2022)

Audio video
- "Make Me Feel Good" on YouTube

"Make Me Feel Good" is a song by Irish electronic collective Belters Only, which includes DJs Bissett and RobbieG, featuring vocals by Jazzy. It was released on 26 November 2021, via Polydor Records. In February 2022, the song reached number one in Ireland and the top 10 in the United Kingdom. They are the first homegrown Irish dance act to reach number-one in Ireland since Mark McCabe with "Maniac 2000" in 2000. It is a cover of the song "At The Club" by Timmy Regisford and Lynn Lockamy, which was written by Lockamy and released in 2010.

== Track listings ==
Digital download and streaming
No.	Title	Length
1.	"Make Me Feel Good"	3:17

Digital download and streaming
No.	Title	Length
1.	"Make Me Feel Good" (VIP)	3:35

Digital download and streaming
No.	Title	Length
1.	"Make Me Feel Good" (James Hype remix)	3:03

Digital download and streaming
No.	Title	Length
1.	"Make Me Feel Good" (Tion Wayne & Bru-C remix)	2:47

== Charts ==
Chart performance for "Make Me Feel Good"
Chart (2022)	Peak position
Hungary (Single Top 40)	34
Ireland (IRMA)	1
Netherlands (Single Tip)	21
UK Singles (OCC)	4
UK Dance (OCC)	2

=== Year-end charts ===
2022 year-end chart performance for "Make Me Feel Good"
Chart (2022)	Position
UK Singles (OCC)	12

== Certifications ==
Certifications for "Make Me Feel Good"
Region	Certification	Certified units/sales
Ireland (IRMA)	10× Platinum	150,000^{^}
United Kingdom (BPI)	2× Platinum	1,200,000^{‡}
^{^} Shipments figures based on certification alone.^{‡} Sales+streaming figures based on certification alone.
