= The Hardest Part (Olivia Dean song) =

2020 single by Olivia Dean

Single by Olivia Dean

from the EP What Am I Gonna Do On Sundays?
- Released: 7 August 2020
- Length: 2:56
- Label: AMF; EMI
- Songwriters: Olivia Dean; Bastian Langebæk; Max Wolfgang
- Producers: Felix Joseph; Bastian Langebaek

Olivia Dean singles chronology
"Baby Come Home" (2020)	"The Hardest Part" (2020)	"Echo" (2020)

Olivia Dean singles chronology
"Carmen" (2023)	"The Hardest Part" (duet version) (2023)	"Ladies Room" (2023)

Leon Bridges singles chronology
"If You Were Mine" (2023)	"The Hardest Part" (duet version) (2023)	"It Was Always You (Siempre fuiste tú)" (2024)

"The Hardest Part" is a song by English singer-songwriter Olivia Dean, released in August 2020 as the lead single from her second extended play, What Am I Gonna Do on Sundays? and later added onto her debut album Messy. As of October 2026, it has been streamed over 471 million times.

Upon release, Dean told Haste Magazine: "I had literally just come out of a really serious relationship that I was in for two years. And it really felt like the closing chapter, you know when you're closing a chapter and starting a new one. And I just didn't want to be really sad. So I just wanted to write a song that was like a positive outlook on moving on from someone and growing up, and accepting that we're different people now. And it's sad but unfortunately we can't really go back so we need to go forward. So 'The Hardest Part' was really a song that I needed to write for myself to just remind me 'You're moving on babe and you're doing OK'."

In June 2023, Dean released a re-recorded version the song with Leon Bridges, with Bridges saying: "The first time I heard 'The Hardest Part', it hit me as a 'one-listen' record. Just has that instant classic feel. Olivia paints such a beautiful world with the song and I'm honoured she asked me to join it."

== Track listing ==
Digital single

1. "The Hardest Part" – 2:56

Digital single

1. "The Hardest Part" (with Leon Bridges) – 2:56
2. "The Hardest Part" (live at Koko) – 3:17
3. "The Hardest Part" (acoustic) – 2:55
4. "The Hardest Part" – 2:56

== Charts ==
Chart performance for "The Hardest Part"
Chart (2025–2026)	Peak position
Australia On Replay Singles (ARIA)	3
Global 200 (Billboard)	109
Ireland (IRMA)	22
Netherlands (Single Top 100)	49
New Zealand Catalogue Singles (RMNZ)	2
South Africa Streaming (TOSAC)	68
UK Singles (Official Charts)	19

Chart performance for "The Hardest Part" (duet version)
Chart (2023–2026)	Peak position
Lithuania Airplay (TopHit)	102
New Zealand Hot Singles (RMNZ)	27
Sweden (Sverigetopplistan)	75
US Adult Alternative Airplay (Billboard)	20

== Certifications ==
Certifications for "The Hardest Part"
Region	Certification	Certified units/sales
Australia (ARIA)	Platinum	70,000^{‡}
Canada (Music Canada)	Gold	40,000^{‡}
Denmark (IFPI Danmark)	Gold	45,000^{‡}
New Zealand (RMNZ)	3× Platinum	90,000^{‡}
United Kingdom (BPI)	2× Platinum	1,200,000^{‡}
^{‡} Sales+streaming figures based on certification alone.
