= Jazzy (singer) =

Irish pop-dance singer-songwriter (born 1996)

- Also known as: Jazzy; Jazzy Yaz
- Born: Yasmine Byrne; 19 September 1996 (age 30); Crumlin, Dublin, Ireland
- Genres: House; dance-pop; eurodance; trance
- Occupations: Singer; songwriter; record producer
- Instrument: Vocals
- Years active: 2020–present
- Label: Chaos

Yasmine Byrne (born 19 September 1996), better known as Jazzy, previously Jazzy Yaz, is an Irish singer-songwriter and DJ. She mainly performs dance-pop and synth-pop. She is best known for her singles "Make Me Feel Good" and "Don't Stop Just Yet" with Belters Only, "Zeros" with Cassö and Headie One, "Somedays" with Sonny Fodera and D.O.D., and her solo singles "Giving Me", "Shooting Star" and "Feel It".

== Music career ==
=== Jazzy Yaz ===
Jazzy first came to attention in 2020 as a member of the Dublin band Powerful Creative Minds, for which she used the name "Jazzy Yaz". On 29 April 2020, the band released "Baby Maybe", and on 19 June 2020 they released "Vivid Dreams". On 9 November 2020 they released "Problems of These Days", on 25 November 2020 they released "Hope Is Good, Change Is Real", and on 16 December 2020, the latter two turned up on their EP #39. On 5 March 2021, Jazzy Yaz featured on Ben Rainey's "Let Yourself Go", a cover of Room 5's "Make Luv". On 14 August 2021, Powerful Creative Minds released a further EP, Am I Wasting Time, and on 15 October 2021, they released "Do For Love".

=== Ireland and UK chart hits ===
On 26 November 2021, Jazzy featured as lead vocals on the Belters Only's song "Make Me Feel Good", which charted at No. 4 on the UK Singles Chart and No. 1 on the Irish Singles Chart, making them the first Irish dance act to top said chart since Mark McCabe did so with Maniac 2000. On 25 March 2022, Belters Only & Jazzy released a second single together titled "Don't Stop Just Yet", which charted at No. 84 on the UK Singles Chart.

On 10 March 2023, Jazzy released her first solo single titled "Giving Me", which peaked at No. 3 on the UK Singles Chart and at No. 1 on the Irish Singles Chart, making her the first Irish solo female artist to top said chart since Julie-Anne Dineen did so with Do You Believe?, and the first Irish female artist to reach No. 1 on Spotify.

On 3 October 2025, Jazzy released the DJ mix Gewah Selects that she said "is made up of new tunes from me, some banging remixes and other tracks I love and have been playing out forever."

=== Artistry ===
Byrne told The Irish Post in March 2023 that Lauryn Hill influenced her to start singing, and also named Raye, Eliza Rose, Carla Monroe, Hayley May, and Karen Harding as influences.

== Personal life ==
Yasmine Byrne was born in Dublin to a single mother and grew up in Crumlin with her brother and a sister. She attended Saint Agnes' Primary School where she learned violin and went to rosary college. She is of part Jamaican descent, through her estranged father. She previously worked at Tesco.

== Discography ==
=== Studio albums ===
List of studio albums
Title	Details	Peak chart positions
Title	Details	IRE
Peace & Patience	Released: 23 October 2026; Label: A Chaos Release, Universal; Format: CD, LP, digital download, streaming	18

=== DJ mixes ===
List of DJ mixes
Title	Details
Gewah Selects	Released: 3 October 2025; Label: A Chaos Release, Universal; Format: digital download, streaming

=== Extended plays ===
List of extended plays, with selected details and chart positions
Title	Details	Peak chart positions
Title	Details	IRE
Constellations	Released: 20 October 2023; Label: Polydor; Format: Digital download, streaming	21
No Bad Vibes	Released: 22 November 2024; Label: Polydor; Format: Digital download, streaming	—
High in the Moment (with Belters Only)	Released: 21 February 2025; Label: Polydor; Format: Digital download, streaming	44

=== Singles ===
List of singles, with year released, selected chart positions, and album name shown
Title	Year	Peak chart positions							Certifications	Album
Title	Year	IRE	AUS	GRE Int.	LAT Air. (Note: From January 2023, when both LaIPA and TopHit began publishing Latvian airplay charts, peak positions are taken from LaIPA where available; however, as not all of Jazzy's singles charted on LaIPA while several peaked on TopHit, TopHit data is also taken into consideration from that date onward.)	LTU Air.	UK	UK Dance	Certifications	Album
"Make Me Feel Good" (with Belters Only)	2022	1	—	—	—	—	4	2	IRMA: Diamond (10× Platinum); BPI: 2× Platinum	2022 Only
"Don't Stop Just Yet" (with Belters Only)	2022	15	—	—	—	—	84	28	BPI: Silver	2022 Only
"Giving Me"	2023	1	—	—	12	14	3	2	IRMA: Diamond (10× Platinum); BPI: 2× Platinum	Constellations
"Feel It"	2023	22	—	—	—	—	35	21	BPI: Silver	Constellations
"NRG"	2023	20	—	—	—	126	—	—		Constellations
"Life Lesson" (with Belters Only and Sonny Fodera)	2023	23	—	—	—	—	—	—	BPI: Silver	Non-album single
"Shooting Star"	2024	34	—	—	—	—	98	37		Constellations (expanded)
"We Groovin" (with Jamie Jones)	2024	—	—	—	—	—	—	—		Non-album singles
"Zeros" (with Cassö and Headie One)	2024	91	—	—	—	—	92	—		Non-album singles
"Make Up"	2024	62	—	—	—	—	—	—		No Bad Vibes
"Somedays" (with Sonny Fodera and D.O.D)	2024	5	26	—	15	14	5	1	IRMA: 2× Platinum; ARIA: 2× Platinum; BPI: 2× Platinum	No Bad Vibes
"The Heat" (with Alok)	2024	—	—	—	4	—	—	—		Non-album single
"No Bad Vibes" (featuring Kilimanjaro)	2024	82	—	25	1	36	50	12	BPI: Gold; IFPI GRE: Gold	No Bad Vibes
"Closer to the Floor" (with Ankhoï)	2025	—	—	—	—	—	82	22		Non-album singles
"High on Me" (with Rossi.)	2025	12	—	—	—	23	18	4	BPI: Gold	Non-album singles
"All This Time" (with Sonny Fodera)	2025	—	—	—	6	—	51	14	BPI: Silver	Can We Do It All Again?
"Hypnotic"	2025	—	—	—	—	75	—	—		Gewah Selects
"Moth to a Flame" (with Luuk Van Dijk)	2025	—	—	—	—	—	—	—		Gewah Selects
"Can't Deny It" (with Spriitzz)	2025	—	—	—	45	37	—	26		Non-album singles
"On a Wave" (with East End Dubs)	2026	—	—	—	—	—	—	—		Non-album singles
"Satisfy" (with Calvin Harris)	2026	76	—	—	4	10	42	8		Non-album singles
"Invisible" (with Chris Lorenzo)	2026	—	—	—	—	34	—	—		Peace & Patience
"My People"	2026	—	—	—	—	65	—	—		Peace & Patience
"Get This Started"	2026	—	—	—	—	—	—	—		Peace & Patience
"Rocket Science"	2026	—	—	—	—	—	—	—		Peace & Patience
"—" denotes a recording that did not chart in that territory.

=== Other charted songs ===
Title	Year	Peak chart positions	Album
Title	Year	MDA Air.	Album
"Peace & Patience"	2026	58	Peace & Patience

== Awards and nominations ==
ARIA Music Awards The ARIA Music Awards is an annual awards ceremony held by the Australian Recording Industry Association. They commenced in 1987.

Year	Nominee / work	Award	Result	Ref.
2025	"Somedays" (with Sonny Fodera and D.O.D.)	Best Dance/Electronic Release	Nominated	
2025	"Somedays" (with Sonny Fodera and D.O.D.)	Song of the Year	Nominated	

Brit Awards The Brit Awards is a ceremony presented by British Phonographic Industry (BPI) to recognise the best in British and international music.

Year	Nominee / work	Award	Result	Ref.
2024	"Giving Me"	International Song of the Year	Nominated	
2025	"Somedays" (with Sonny Fodera and D.O.D.)	Song of the Year	Nominated	

Electronic Dance Music Awards The Electronic Dance Music Awards (also known as the EDMAs) is an annual music award event focusing across most all electronic dance music genres. It commenced in 2022.

Year	Nominee / work	Award	Result	Ref.
2026	Jazzy	Breakout Artist of the Year	Nominated	
2026	"All This Time" — Sonny Fodera and Jazzy	House Song of the Year	Nominated	

Other

Year	Organisation	Nominee / work	Category	Result	Ref.
2024	BBC Radio 1 Dance Awards	Herself	Best Breakthrough Artist	Nominated	
2024	BBC Radio 1 Dance Awards	Herself	Dance Vocalist	Nominated	
2025	BBC Radio 1 Dance Awards	Herself	Dance Vocalist	Won	
2026	BBC Radio 1 Dance Awards	Herself	MC or Vocalist of the Year	Won	
