= Mabel discography =

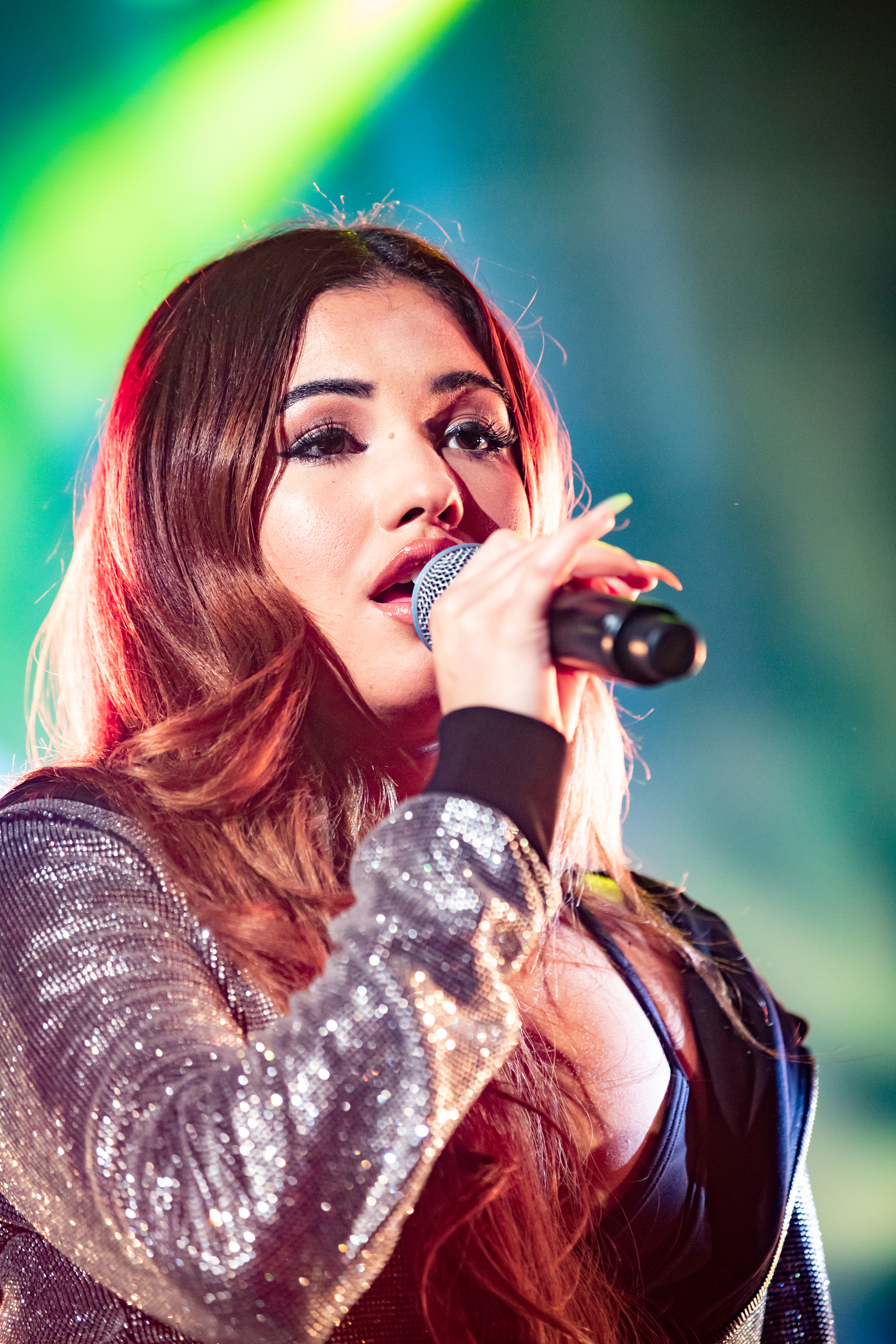
- Mabel in 2018
- Studio albums: 2
- EPs: 5
- Singles: 27
- Mixtapes: 2

English singer Mabel has released two studio albums, five extended plays, two mixtapes and twenty-seven singles.

Her debut studio album, High Expectations, was released in August 2019. It peaked at number three on the UK Albums Chart and was certified gold by the British Phonographic Industry (BPI). The album included the UK top-10 singles "Don't Call Me Up", "Mad Love" and "Boyfriend".

"Let Them Know" was released on 18 June 2021. On 16 July 2021, Mabel released the song "Take It Home" as part of Pokémon's 25th anniversary album. On 29 October 2021, Mabel and Joel Corry released the song "I Wish". The song was followed by a cover of the Cyndi Lauper song "Time After Time", which she recorded for the 2021 McDonald's Christmas television advertisements.

Between the release of the first and second track from her then upcoming second studio album, Mabel released two eps: Magic and Christmas.

The second single, "Good Luck", featuring Jax Jones and Swedish EDM act Galantis was released on 18 March 2022. "Overthinking" featuring 24kGoldn was released as the third and final single off the album on 20 May 2022. "Let Love Go" featuring Lil Tecca and "Crying on the Dance Floor" were released as promotional singles from the album on 29 June and 12 July 2022 respectively. Her second studio album About Last Night... was released on July 15, 2022.

== Albums ==
=== Studio albums ===
List of studio albums, with selected details, chart positions, and certifications
Title	Details	Peak chart positions										Certifications
Title	Details	UK	AUS	BEL (FL)	CAN	FRA	GER	IRE	NL	SWI	US	Certifications
High Expectations	Released: 2 August 2019; Label: Polydor; Formats: LP, CD, cassette, digital download, streaming	3	70	50	47	80	58	5	41	29	198	BPI: Platinum; SNEP: Gold
About Last Night...	Released: 15 July 2022; Label: Polydor; Formats: LP, CD, cassette, digital download, streaming	2	—	—	—	—	100	39	—	91	—	
"—" denotes items which were not released in that country or failed to chart.

=== Mixtapes ===
List of mixtapes, with selected details, chart positions, and certifications
Title	Details	Peak chart positions					Certifications
Title	Details	UK	CAN	DEN	FRA	IRE	Certifications
Ivy to Roses	Released: October 13, 2017; Label: Polydor; Formats: LP, cassette, digital download, streaming	28	95	32	128	58	BPI: Gold
Mabel	Released: July 25, 2025; Label: Polydor; Formats: CD, cassette, Digital download, streaming	— (Note: "Mabel" did not enter the UK Albums Chart, but peaked at number 94 on the UK Album Downloads Chart.)	—	—	—	—	

== Extended plays ==
List of extended plays, with selected details
Title	Details
Bedroom	Released: 26 May 2017; Label: Polydor; Formats: Streaming
Stripped Session	Released: 30 August 2019; Label: Polydor; Formats: Digital download, streaming
Love Lockdown	Released: 6 November 2020; Label: Polydor; Formats: Digital download, streaming
Mabel & Chill	Released: 13 November 2020; Label: Polydor; Formats: Digital download, streaming
Let's Move	Released: 27 November 2020; Label: Polydor; Formats: Digital download, streaming
Magic	Released: 1 April 2021; Label: Polydor; Formats: Digital download, streaming
Christmas	Released: 1 December 2021; Label: Polydor; Formats: Digital download, streaming

== Singles ==
=== As lead artist ===
List of singles as lead artist, with selected chart positions and certifications, showing year released and album name
Title	Year	Peak chart positions										Certifications	Album
Title	Year	UK	AUS	AUT	BEL (FL)	GER	IRE	NL	SWE	SWI	US	Certifications	Album
"Know Me Better"	2015	—	—	—	—	—	—	—	—	—	—		Non-album singles
"My Boy My Town"	2015	—	—	—	— (Note: "My Boy My Town" did not enter the Ultratop 50 chart, but peaked at number 95 on the Ultratip chart.)	—	—	—	—	—	—		Non-album singles
"Thinking of You"	2016	—	—	—	—	—	—	—	—	—	—		High Expectations (Note: "Thinking of You" appears as bonus track on Japanese edition of High Expectations as well as appears on Love Lockdown EP.)
"Finders Keepers" (Note: "Finders Keepers" also features on Mabel's mixtape, Ivy to Roses and appear as bonus track on High Expectations.) (featuring Kojo Funds)	2017	8	—	—	—	—	45	—	—	—	—	BPI: 2× Platinum	Bedroom
"Bedroom"	2017	—	—	—	—	—	—	—	—	—	—		Bedroom
"Begging"	2017	—	—	—	—	—	—	—	—	—	—		Ivy to Roses (Note: "My Lover", "Fine Line", "Cigarette" and "Ring Ring" all appear as bonus tracks on High Expectations.)
"My Lover" (Remix) (Note: "My Lover" also features on Not3s' mixtape, Take Not3s.) (with Not3s)	2017	14	—	—	—	—	47	—	—	—	—	BPI: Platinum	Ivy to Roses
"Fine Line" (featuring Not3s)	2018	11	—	—	—	—	38	—	—	—	—	BPI: Platinum	Ivy to Roses
"Cigarette" (Note: "Cigarette" also features on Raye's EP, Side Tape.) (with Raye and Stefflon Don)	2018	41	—	—	—	—	74	—	—	—	—	BPI: Gold	Ivy to Roses
"One Shot" (Note: "One Shot" also appears on the Japanese edition of High Expectations.)	2018	44	—	—	—	—	64	—	—	—	—	BPI: Silver	Ivy to Roses
"Don't Call Me Up" (Note: "Don't Call Me Up" also features on Mabel's mixtape, Ivy to Roses.)	2019	3	16	10	2	10	3	2	10	9	66	BPI: 4× Platinum; ARIA: 5× Platinum; BEA: 2× Platinum; BVMI: 3× Gold; GLF: Platinum; IFPI AUT: Platinum; RIAA: Platinum	High Expectations
"Mad Love"	2019	8	67	56	50	54	6	33	75	46	—	BPI: 2× Platinum; ARIA: Platinum; BVMI: Gold	High Expectations
"God Is a Dancer" (with Tiësto)	2019	15	—	—	48	95	25	37	56	—	—	BPI: Platinum	The London Sessions
"Loneliest Time of Year"	2019	—	—	—	— (Note: "Loneliest Time of Year" did not enter the Ultratop 50 chart, but peaked at number 11 on the Ultratip chart.)	—	—	—	78	—	—		Christmas
"Boyfriend"	2020	10	—	—	— (Note: "Boyfriend" did not enter the Ultratop 50 chart, but peaked at number four on the Ultratip chart.)	—	9	—	— (Note: "Boyfriend" did not enter the Swedish Singellista Chart, but peaked at number five on the Swedish Heatseeker Chart.)	—	—	BPI: Platinum; ARIA: Gold	High Expectations
"West Ten" (with AJ Tracey)	2020	5	—	—	— (Note: "West Ten" did not enter the Ultratop 50 chart, but peaked at number 39 on the Ultratip chart.)	—	16	—	—	—	—	BPI: Platinum	Flu Game
"Tick Tock" (with Clean Bandit featuring 24kGoldn)	2020	8	61	53	— (Note: "Tick Tock" did not enter the Ultratop 50 chart, but peaked at number 3 on the Ultratip chart.)	48	13	27	94	17	—	BPI: Platinum; BEA: Gold	High Expectations
"Let Them Know"	2021	19	—	—	—	—	19	11	— (Note: "Let Them Know" did not enter the Swedish Singles Chart, but peaked at number 12 on the Swedish Heatseeker chart.)	—	—	BPI: Gold	About Last Night...
"Take It Home"	2021	—	—	—	—	—	—	—	—	—	—		Pokémon 25: The Album
"Time After Time"	2021	71	—	—	—	—	—	—	—	—	—		Christmas
"Good Luck" (with Jax Jones and Galantis)	2022	45	—	—	—	—	50	—	—	—	—		About Last Night...
"Overthinking" (with 24kGoldn)	2022	88	—	—	—	—	87	—	—	—	—		About Last Night...
"Deal or No Deal" (with A1 x J1) (Note: "Deal or No Deal" only appears on the digital and streaming edition of About Last Night....)	2022	98	—	—	—	—	—	—	—	—	—		About Last Night...
"Zero" (with Black Sherif)	2024	—	—	—	—	—	—	—	—	—	—		Non-album singles
"Look at My Body Pt. II" (featuring Shygirl)	2024	—	—	—	—	—	—	—	—	—	—		Non-album singles
"Female Intuition"	2024	—	—	—	—	—	—	—	—	—	—		Non-album singles
"Stupid Dumb" (featuring Ty Dolla Sign)	2024	—	—	—	—	—	—	—	—	—	—		Non-album singles
"All Over You" (featuring King Promise)	2025	—	—	—	—	—	—	—	—	—	—		Non-album singles
"Benz" (featuring Clavish)	2025	—	—	—	—	—	—	—	—	—	—		Mabel
"January 19"	2025	—	—	—	—	—	—	—	—	—	—		Mabel
"Love Me Gentle"	2025	—	—	—	—	—	—	—	—	—	—		Mabel
"—" denotes items which were not released in that country or failed to chart.

=== As featured artist ===
List of singles as featured artist, showing year released, selected chart positions, certifications and album name
Title	Year	Peak chart positions		Certifications	Album
Title	Year	UK	IRE	Certifications	Album
"I Feel Your Pain" (SBTRKT featuring DRAM and Mabel)	2016	—	—		Save Yourself
"Plug Walk" (Rich the Kid featuring Mabel)	2018	—	—		Non-album single
"Ring Ring" (Note: "Ring Ring" also features on Jax Jones' EP, Snacks.) (Jax Jones featuring Mabel and Rich the Kid)	2018	12	15	BPI: Platinum	Ivy to Roses
"Times Like These" (as part of Live Lounge Allstars)	2020	1	64		Non-album single
"I Wish" (Joel Corry featuring Mabel)	2021	17	16	BPI: Platinum	About Last Night... (Note: "I Wish" only appears on the digital and streaming edition of About Last Night....) and Another Friday Night
"Phone Call" (Onefour featuring Mabel)	2025	—	—		Look at Me Now
"—" denotes items which were not released in that country or failed to chart.

=== Promotional singles ===
List of promotional singles, showing year released, selected chart positions and album name
Title	Year	Peak chart positions		Album
Title	Year	UK	SWE Heat.	Album
"Bad Behaviour"	2019	94	8	High Expectations
"OK (Anxiety Anthem)"	2019	—	—	High Expectations
"Let Love Go" (featuring Lil Tecca)	2022	—	—	About Last Night...
"Crying on the Dance Floor"	2022	—	—	About Last Night...
"Vitamins"	2024	—	—	Non-album singles
"Look at My Body Pt. I"	2024	—	—	Non-album singles
"Chat"	2024	—	—	Non-album singles
"—" denotes items which were not released in that country or failed to chart.

== Guest appearances ==
List of non-single guest appearances, showing year released, other performing artists and album name
Title	Year	Other artist(s)	Album
"Outside"	2018	Burna Boy	Outside
"Lullaby"	2025	Amena Youssef, Brian Eno, Celeste, Dan Smith, Kieran Brunt, Lana Lubany, Leigh-Anne, London Community Gospel Choir, Nadine Shah, Nai Barghouti, Neneh Cherry, Sura Abdo, Tyson, Yasmeen Ayyashi, Ysee	Charity single

== Music videos ==
List of music videos, showing year released, other performing artists and directors
Title	Year	Other artist(s)	Director(s)	Ref.
"My Boy My Town"	2015	None	Bafic	
"Talk About Forever"	2016	None	Holly Blakey	
"Thinking of You	2016	None	Joe Alexander	
"Bedroom"	2017	None	Holly Blakey	
"Finders Keepers"	2017	Kojo Funds	Savanah Leaf	
"My Lover"	2017	Not3s	Kirx	
"Fine Line"	2018	Not3s	Adriaan Louw	
"Cigarette"	2018	Raye, Stefflon Don	Jackson Ducasse	
"Ring Ring"	2018	Jax Jones, Rich the Kid	Luke Davies	
"One Shot"	2018	None	Aaron A	
"One Shot" (remix)	2018	Yungen, Avelino	Kirx	
"Don't Call Me Up"	2019	None	Brock Neal-Roberts	
"Mad Love"	2019	None	Marc Klasfeld	
"Bad Behaviour"	2019	None	Oliver Kane	
"OK (Anxiety Anthem)"	2019	None	Jade Jackman	
"God Is a Dancer"	2019	Tiesto	Isaac Rentz	
"Boyfriend"	2020	None	Isaac Rentz	
"Tick Tock"	2020	Clean Bandit	Clean Bandit	
"Let Them Know"	2021	None		
"Take It Home"	2021	None		
"I Wish"	2021	Joel Corry	Eliott Simpson	
"Time After Time"	2021	None		
"Good Luck"	2022	Jax Jones, Galantis	Isaac Rentz	
"Overthinking"	2022	24kGoldn		

== Songwriting credits ==
- "Trash" - Little Mix (2021) from the greatest hits album Between Us.
