= 2021 Reading and Leeds Festival =

Music festival in England

- Dates: 27 August 2021 – 29 August 2021
- Locations: Reading, Berkshire, and Leeds, West Yorkshire, England
- Website: www.readingfestival.com

The 2021 Reading and Leeds Festival took place between 27 and 29 August 2021 in Reading, Berkshire, and Leeds, West Yorkshire, over the August bank holiday weekend. The headliners were Liam Gallagher, Biffy Clyro (who replaced Queens of the Stone Age), Stormzy, Catfish and the Bottlemen, Post Malone and Disclosure. This was the first Reading and Leeds festival since the 2019 edition as the 2020 edition was cancelled due to the COVID-19 pandemic in England.

== Changes for 2021 edition ==
For this year's edition, Reading & Leeds decided on hosting two main stages at each location, one to the west and one to the east. This was done by dropping the BBC Radio 1 stage. They would also combine both The Pit/The Lock Up stage, and the Festival Republic stage together. Each stage taking up one day of the festival.

== Line-up ==
Once the second wave of artists were announced, 4 acts had to cancel due to 'circumstances out of their control'. These acts were Charli XCX, Da Baby, Doja Cat and 100 gecs.

On 28 July 2021, the festival announced that more artists were added to the line-up, and also that some more artists had to pull out. Most notably, one of the headliners, Queens of the Stone Age had to pull out. Although there was no specific COVID-19 reasoning, the band plus many more international artists had to pull out from appearing at the festival, possibly due to COVID-19 travel restrictions. Other artists that had to pull out were Wallows, Denzel Curry, Madison Beer, Sofi Tukker, Oliver Tree, Tate McRae, Nation of Language, Super Whatever and MizorMac.

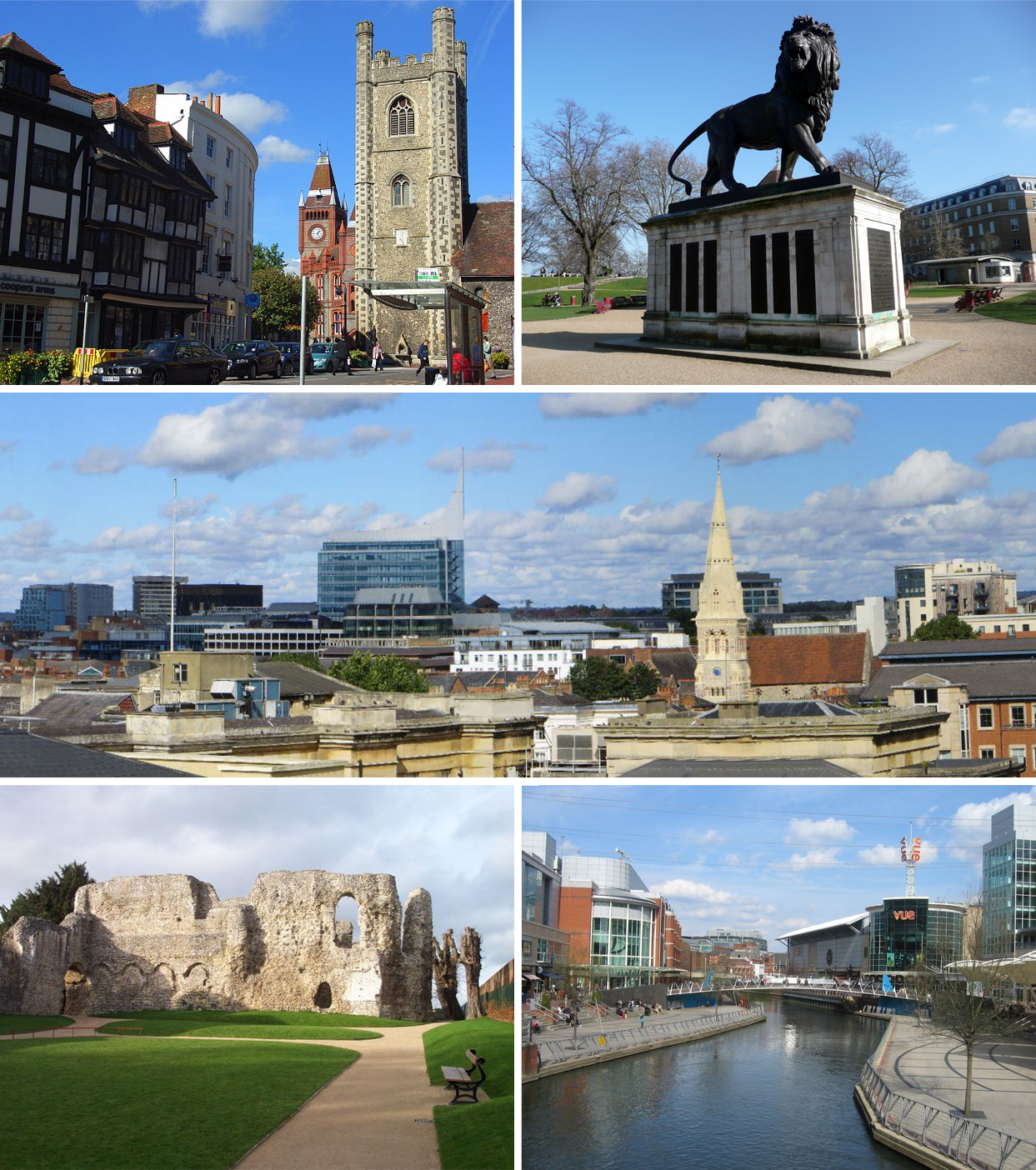
Reading in Berkshire which was one of the locations of the festival

On 14 August 2021, more acts were announced along with some more drop outs which were Gallows, Surfaces, Cleopatrick, Ho99o9, Spritbox and 070 Shake. These were due to "various restrictions and logistics".

On the week leading up to the weekend of the festival, Machine Gun Kelly had to pull out of the festival because of 'restrictions and logistics'. He was replaced by Blossoms.

The day before the festival, Fever 333 and Creeper both had to cancel their appearances for "circumstances out of their control - one of those being a COVID-19 protocol". With both bands performing simultaneously on The Pit, they were replaced by one act, that being Waterparks. Fever 333's other set on the Main Stage was replaced by You Me at Six.

Jxdn also pulled out of the festival, but the reason and place are unknown.

=== Main Stage East ===
Reading set times in Brackets in BST (British Summer Time) and headliners in Bold.

Reading Friday	Reading Saturday	Reading Sunday
Leeds Saturday	Leeds Sunday	Leeds Friday
**Stormzy** (21:00); AJ Tracey (19:45); Mabel (18:00); Declan McKenna (16:30); MoStack (15:05); Inhaler (13:05); Demob Happy (12:45)	**Post Malone** (22:05); Two Door Cinema Club (19:50); The Kid Laroi (18:10); Sigrid (16:40); Beabadoobee (15:20); Easy Life (14:10); The Academic (12:50)	**Liam Gallagher** (22:00); Gerry Cinnamon (19:45); Wolf Alice (18:05); Tom Grennan (16:35); KSI (15:10); The Hunna (13:50); The Struts (12:35)

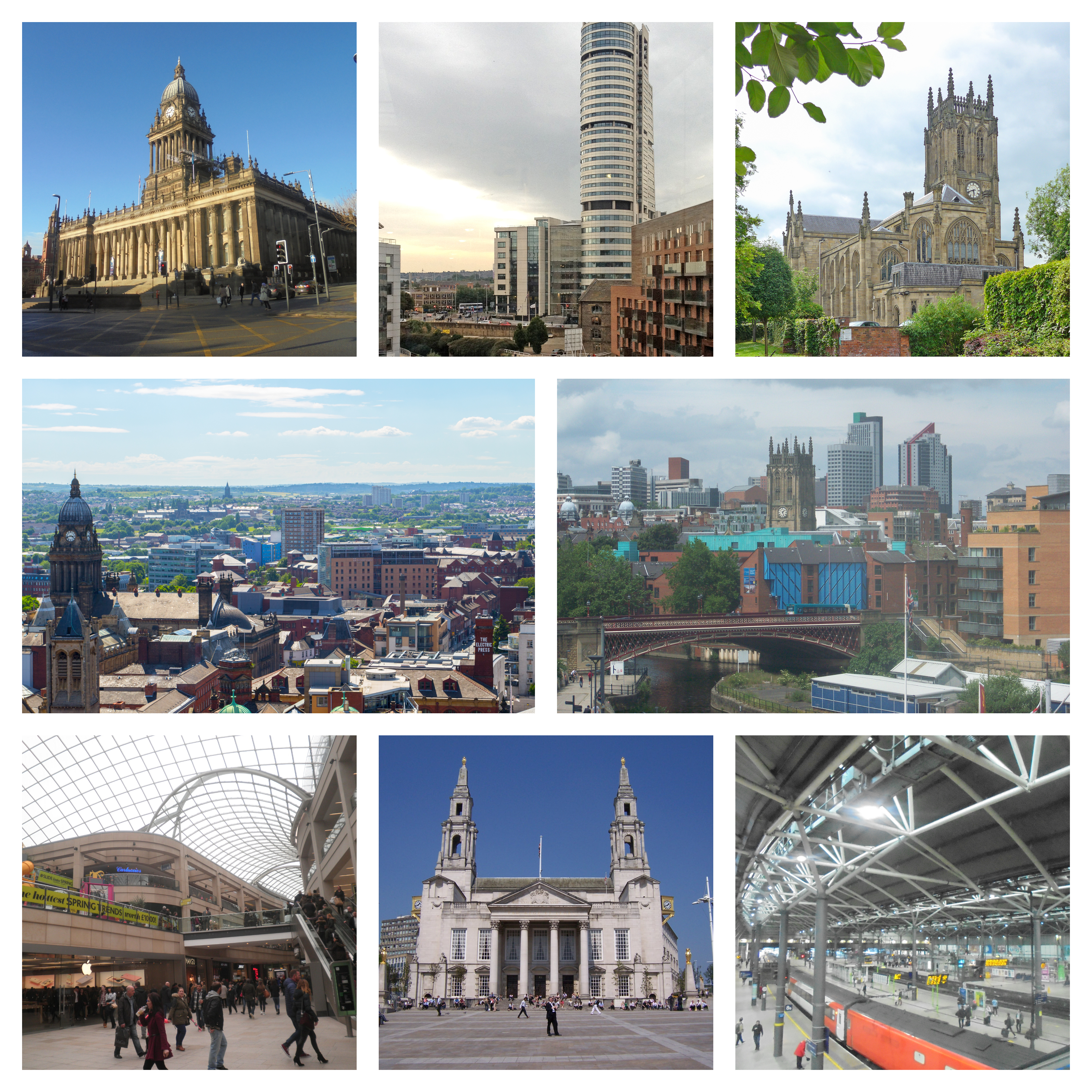
Leeds in West Yorkshire which was the other location for the festival

==== Setlists ====
Mabel
1. "Mad Love"
2. "Finders Keepers"
3. "Bad Behaviour"
4. "My Lover (Remix)"
5. "Cigarette"
6. "Boyfriend"
7. "Tick Tock" (Clean Bandit cover)
8. "Fine Line"
9. "God Is a Dancer" (Tiësto cover)
10. "West Ten"
11. "Let Them Know"
12. "Ring Ring" (Jax Jones cover)
13. "Don't Call Me Up"
Becky Hill
1. "Hold On" (Netsky cover)
2. "Afterglow" (Wilkinson cover)
3. "Gecko (Overdrive) (Oliver Heldens cover)
4. "Last Time"
5. "Heaven on My Mind"
6. "Lose Control
7. "My Heart Goes (La Di Da)"
8. "Better Off Without You"
9. "Wish You Well" (Sigala cover)
10. "Remember"

=== Main Stage West ===
Reading Friday	Reading Saturday	Reading Sunday
Leeds Saturday	Leeds Sunday	Leeds Friday
**Catfish and the Bottlemen** (20:35); Sam Fender (18:50); Aitch (17:15); Sea Girls (15:40); Sports Team (14:35); The Snuts (13:20); Nothing but Thieves (12:05)	**Disclosure** (20:45); The Wombats (18:55); Slowthai (17:25); Becky Hill (15:55); I Dont Know How but They Found Me (14:45); You Me at Six (13:25); The Hara (12:15)	**Biffy Clyro** (20:40); Yungblud (18:50); Blossoms - replaced Machine Gun Kelly (17:15); Arizona Zervas (15:50); Neck Deep (14:30); Russ Millions (13:15); Hot Milk (12:00)

=== BBC Radio 1 Dance Stage ===
Reading Friday	Reading Saturday	Reading Sunday
Leeds Saturday	Leeds Sunday	Leeds Friday
**MK** DJ Set (21:45); Hybrid Minds (20:10); Dom Dolla (19:05); Franky Wah (18:15); Prospa (17:30); Noizu (16:45); 220 Kid (16:05); Mimi Webb (15:15); JC Stewart (14:25); Lowes (13:30); Gracey (12:45); Kara Marni (12:00)	**Solardo** (21:45); Sonny Fodera (20:20); Hannah Wants (19:10); Danny Howard (18:10); James Organ (17:25); Chaya (16:40); Syreeta (15:55); Thomas Headon (15:05); Alfie Templeman (14:20); KennyHoopla (13:35); Will Joseph Cook (12:45); NOISY (12:00)	**Crucast** (20:15); Shy FX (19:15); Nathan Dawe (18:15); Koven (17:20); Harriet Jaxxon (16:30); AMA (15:45); L Devine (15:05); Bad Boy Chiller Crew (14:15); Niko B (13:25); Sam Tompkins (12:40); Flawes (12:00)

=== The Lock Up/The Pit/Festival Republic Stage ===
Reading Friday	Reading Saturday	Reading Sunday
Leeds Saturday	Leeds Sunday	Leeds Friday
**Dinosaur Pile-Up** (22:45); Boston Manor (21:45); Ashnikko (20:50); Yonaka (19:50); Nova Twins (19:00); Frank Carter & The Rattlesnakes (secret set, Reading only) (18:05); Dana Dentata (17:15); Wargasm (16:25); Grace McKagan (15:30); Don Broco (secret set, Reading only) (14:35); Bad Nerves (13:45); Chapter and Verse (12:55); Punkband (12:05)	**Waterparks** (21:15); Holding Absence (20:15); City Morgue (19:15); Loathe (18:15); Badflower (17:15); Bob Vylan (16:20); Jazmin Bean (15:25); Macca Wiles (14:30); Dead Poet Society (13:35); Gender Roles (12:40)	**girl in red** (22:40); The Sherlocks (secret set, Leeds only) (21:05); Bakar (20:35); Holly Humberstone (19:35); Mae Muller (18:35); Bloxx (17:35); Jake Bugg (secret set) (16:35); Baby Queen (15:40); LYRA (14:45); Sophie and the Giants (13:50); LUCY BLUE (13:00); Blondes (12:10)

=== BBC Radio 1Xtra Stage ===
Reading Friday	Reading Saturday	Reading Sunday
Leeds Saturday	Leeds Sunday	Leeds Friday
**Jack Harlow** (20:55); Ghetts (19:55); Meekz (18:55); Ivorian Doll (17:55); Backroad Gee (16:50); Tiffany Calver (16:00); Shaybo (15:15); Blanco (14:35); Tia Carys (13:55); Dreya Mac (13:15); Antslive (12:35); DJ Tiiny (12:00)	**Tyga** (20:55); Tion Wayne (19:55); Central Cee (18:55); m24 (17:55); S1mba (16:55); Miss Lafamilia (16:05); DJ Target (15:20); Trillary Banks (14:35); Che Lingo (13:50); Kenny Allstar (12:30); Keedz (12:05)	**OFB** (22:15); Digga D (21:05); m1llionz (20:05); Swarmz (19:05); Darkoo (18:10); Abra Cadabra (17:20); S-X (16:30); Cole LC (15:45); Sam Wise (15:00); Aystar (14:15); French The Kid (13:30); Kam-Bu (12:45)

=== BBC Music Introducing Stage ===
Reading Friday	Reading Saturday	Reading Sunday
Leeds Saturday	Leeds Sunday	Leeds Friday
**Low Hummer** (20:15); Downtown Kayoto (19:40); GRAFT (18:30); Tayo Sound (17:55); Lady Ice (16:55); The Rills (16:25); Bad Boy Chiller Crew (secret set, Leeds only) (16:05); LVRA (15:05); FFSYTHO (14:15); Dea Matrona (13:15); Maisie Peters (secret set) (12:55)	**Calva Louise** (20:25); BULL (19:45); Master Peace (18:35); Martha Hill (18:05); Finn Askew (17:05); Low Girl (16:35); LARRY THE PINK HUMAN (secret set, Reading only) (15:15); Bonnie Kemplay (14:05); Police Car Collective (12:55); YONAKA (secret set, Leeds only) (12:55); Mega (12:05)	**Josie Man** (20:20); BERWYN (19:40); Yard Act (18:30); STONE (18:00); Pa Salieu (secret set, Reading only) (16:25); Meg Ward (15:30); Lauran Hibberd (15:05); FUR (13:45); Andrew Cushin (12:30)

=== The Alternative Stage ===
Reading Friday	Reading Saturday	Reading Sunday
Leeds Saturday	Leeds Sunday	Leeds Friday
**TRANGRESSIVE TAKEOVER SILENT DISCO TIL LATE** (21:30); Katherine Ryan (17:20); LAURA SMYTH (15:55); Reginald D Hunter (15:05); KIRI PRITCHARD-MCLEAN (14:35); Ria Lina (14:05); Jack Gleadow (13:35); Luke Wright (12:30); CECILIA KNAPP (12:10); Mark Olver (12:00)	**SHACK VS SUPA DUPA FLY TIL LATE** (22:30); Simon Amstell (17:15); Milton Jones (15:50); Chris Washington (15:20); JAYDE DREAMS (14:45); Fin Taylor (14:15); Dane Baptiste (13:35); Russell Hicks (13:30); The Comedy Store (12:00)	**Buttoned Down Disco** (22:45); Joel Dommett (17:15); JAMIE D'SOUZA (16:45); Helen Bauer (16:15); Tiff Stevenson (15:40); ELLIOT STEEL (15:10); Rachel Fairburn (14:05); Lloyd Griffith (13:35); Scott Bennett (13:05); Thanyia Moore (13:00); Youth Climate Justice Coalition (12:00)

== COVID-19 vaccine offerings ==
It was announced that there would be 'Vaccine Tents' at both locations for people to have their COVID-19 vaccine. The vaccines were on offer at Reading Festival between 9.30am and 5pm from Thursday 26 August until Sunday 29 August, and from 9am to 1pm on Monday 30 August. At Leeds Festival, the vaccine was offered from 10am until 4pm from Friday 27 August to Sunday 29 August, and from 8am to 11am on Monday 30 August. Health Professionals were also available at Leeds Festival on Thursday 26 August between 10am and 4pm to for revellers to discuss the vaccine. On Wednesday 27 August 2021, there was a two-hour slot at lunchtime for festival staff to have the jab. There was also a slot for early arrivals to have jab on the afternoon of Wednesday 27 August 2021.

Dr Nikki Kanani, a GP and deputy lead for NHS England's vaccination programme, said: "Thanks to the hard work of NHS staff and volunteers, more than half a million young people aged between 16 and 17 have had their first dose as teams across the country have worked tirelessly to get their communities protected, vaccinating at convenient pop-up clinics in the park, at places of worship and stadiums, and now at Reading and Leeds [Festival]". It is great to see the return of live music and performances, and as festival-goers head to the main stage this weekend to see their favourite headliners, I am also urging anyone who hasn't had to add the 'vaccine tent' to their festival itinerary to get that lifesaving vaccine as the best protection we can get from Coronavirus". Health Secretary Sajid Javid insisted getting a jab is "one of the most important things you can do to protect yourself and your loved ones." He said: "Vaccines are saving lives and allowing us to regain the freedoms we've been looking forward to over the last 18 months - from visiting family abroad to festivals and gigs." He finished by saying: "Its brilliant to see different sectors and industries stepping up to help get the country vaccinated, making it easier than ever to get your jab."

== Live coverage ==
Highlights of Reading and Leeds Festival were shown on BBC One - Stormzy's set was shown at 11.55pm on Saturday 28 August and Liam Gallagher's set was shown at 11.35pm on Sunday 29 August, BBC iPlayer - for up to a year after the festival, on BBC Radio 1 - from 11am on all three days, BBC Radio 1Xtra - from 7pm on Saturday 28 August 2021 and BBC Music's YouTube channel - which features playlists of top performances from the 2019 edition and there was also plenty of catch-up videos from this year's edition.
