= Put Your Name on It =

Put Your Name on It may refer to:

- "Put Your Name on It", a song by Kelly Rowland from the 2013 album Talk a Good Game
- "Put Your Name on It", a song by Mabel from the 2019 album High Expectations
