= High Expectations =

2019 studio album by Mabel

- Artwork on digital editions and some physical releases

Studio album by Mabel
- Released: 2 August 2019
- Recorded: 2018–2019
- Studios: Rokstone, London; Spaceship, London and Los Angeles; The Collection, London; Breakfast, Kensal Rise; SARM Music Village, Ladbroke Grove
- Genres: Pop; R&B
- Length: 61:22
- Label: Polydor UK
- Producers: Steve Mac; Fraser T. Smith; Jordan Riley; Tre Jean-Marie; Dre Skull; Oak; Al Shux; MakeYouKnowLove; 169; Snakehips; MXXWLL; MNEK; Koz

Mabel chronology
Ivy to Roses (2017)	High Expectations (2019)	About Last Night... (2022)

Singles from High Expectations
- 1. "Don't Call Me Up" Released: 18 January 2019; 2. "Mad Love" Released: 7 June 2019

High Expectations is the debut studio album by British singer Mabel. It was released on 2 August 2019 by Polydor UK. Originally scheduled for release on 15 July, the album was pushed back to 2 August to alter several songs. Mabel worked with writers and producers such as Tre Jean-Marie, Steve Mac and MNEK to create the album, with its tracks incorporating elements of pop and R&B.

The album was supported by two singles. Its lead single "Don't Call Me Up" peaked at number three on the UK Singles Chart for three consecutive weeks, making it Mabel's highest-charting single in the UK. It also became her international mainstream breakthrough, managing to peak within the top 10 in over twenty countries. The track also became Mabel's first US Billboard Hot 100 chart entry, peaking at 66 on the US Billboard Hot 100. The album's second and final single "Mad Love" became Mabel's third UK top-10 single, peaking at number eight.

Upon its release, High Expectations received positive reviews from music critics, many of whom complimented its production and the singer's vocals. The album was also a commercial success, debuting at number three on the UK Albums Chart and at number five on the Irish Albums Chart.

== Background ==
In October 2017, Mabel released her debut mixtape, Ivy to Roses. Its lead single, "Finders Keepers", peaked at number eight on the UK Singles Chart and became her first top ten single. The mixtape was then reissued in January 2019, featuring six additional singles including "Don't Call Me Up". High Expectations was then officially announced on 18 April of the same year, with a scheduled release date of July 12. The release date was later pushed back to August 2.

== Singles ==
The album's lead single "Don't Call Me Up" was released on 18 January 2019. It was initially included on the 2019 reissue of Ivy to Roses. The song peaked at number three on the UK Singles Chart for three consecutive weeks, making it Mabel's highest-charting single in the UK. It became her international mainstream breakthrough, managing to peak within the top 10 in over twenty other countries including Belgium, Ireland, the Netherlands and Norway where it reached the top three. The track also became the singer's first US Billboard Hot 100 chart entry where it rose to number 66.

"Mad Love" was released as the second and final single from the album on 7 June 2019. It became Mabel's third UK top-10 single, peaking at number eight, and her second top-10 single in Ireland where it reached number six.

The album's only promotional single, "Bad Behaviour", was released on 23 July 2019, alongside a music video directed by Oliver Kane. The track debuted at number 94 on the UK Singles Chart. A music video for the track "OK (Anxiety Anthem)" premiered on Dazed on 16 August 2019, directed by Jade Jackman.

== Critical reception ==
Professional ratings
Aggregate scores
Source	Rating
Metacritic	61/100
Review scores
Source	Rating
Clash	7/10
DIY	3/5 stars
The Guardian	3/5 stars
musicOMH	4/5 stars
NME	3/5 stars
The Observer	3/5 stars
PopMatters	5/10 stars
Q	3/5 stars
The Skinny	3/5 stars
Uncut	6/10

High Expectations received positive reviews from music critics upon its release. At Metacritic, which assigns a normalised rating out of 100 to reviews from mainstream publications, the album received an average score of 61, based on 10 reviews. Reviewing the album for musicOMH, Ben Devlin hailed it as "a convincing display of versatility and quality songwriting that firmly establishes Mabel as a force to be reckoned with in UK pop", while Chris Taylor of DIY regarded it as "effortlessly cool" with "no faux-earnestness". Q magazine's Laura Barton called the album "highly polished" and said the singer "perfected the art of writing songs that even on first listen sound totally ubiquitous". In NME, Hannah Mylrea wrote that Mabel's "gorgeous silky vocals soar, the glossy production is stellar, but the exuberance and effervescent attitude that make tunes like 'Don't Call Me Up' so brilliant aren't found throughout."

Andrew Wright of The Skinny stated that the singer found her individual identity with High Expectations which he described as well-rounded despite "some over-zealous Top 40 attempts". Conversely, Joe Hale of Clash found it "almost too airbrushed, with Mabel playing it a little too safe to qualify being described as wholly original or progressive", but concluded that it had "some real highlights" and "moments of talent and flair". Despite finding the album strong and well-crafted, The Guardian's Alexis Petridis also believed it lacked personality and only "occasionally hints its maker might be more interesting and individual". Kitty Empire was more critical in The Observer, writing, "High Expectations is just disappointingly all right, lacking any playfulness, or top spin, or a sense of who Mabel is," while Uncut critic Johnny Sharp commented, "Despite some pleasant enough tunes, she lacks the vocal charisma to stand out from other wannabe Rihannas, Mileys and Dua Lipas." Mick Jacobs of PopMatters concluded, "Though sung in a beautiful, agile voice, the album's contents lack any innovation that truly set them apart, even amongst themselves."

== Commercial performance ==
High Expectations debuted at number three on the UK Albums Chart, behind Ed Sheeran's No.6 Collaborations Project and Lewis Capaldi's Divinely Uninspired to a Hellish Extent, with first-week sales of 9,761 album-equivalent units. It dropped to number 10 in its second week with sales of 4,184 units. On the Irish Albums Chart, it debuted at number five, the highest new entry for the chart dated 9 August 2019. The album also debuted in the top 40 in Norway and Switzerland. In the US, High Expectations entered at number 198 on the Billboard 200. Hugh McIntyre of Forbes cited its debut as "a prime example of how the UK and the US music industries can be drastically different".

== Tour ==
Mabel announced the US and Canada dates of her headlining tour in support of the album on 7 June 2019. General sale of tickets also began on the same date. Dates in the UK and Europe were announced on July 19, 2019, via her social media. The general sale of tickets for European dates began on July 21. The supporting act was R&B singer Kali Claire. The European leg of the tour commenced on January 28, 2020, in Dublin, Ireland.

List of concerts, showing date, city, country, venue and opening acts
Date	City	Country	Venue	Opening Act(s)
North America
12 August 2019	Cambridge	United States	The Sinclair	Maya B
14 August 2019	Washington	United States	Union Stage	Maya B
15 August 2019	New York	United States	The Bowery Ballroom	Maya B
17 August 2019	Toronto	Canada	Velvet Underground	Maya B
19 August 2019	San Francisco	United States	Slim's	Maya B
20 August 2019	Los Angeles	United States	Troubadour	Maya B
Europe
24 August 2019	London	UK	Clapham Common	-
24 August 2019	Reading	UK	Little John's Farm	-
25 August 2019	Leeds	UK	Bramham Park	-
31 August 2019	Costessey	UK	Norfolk Showground	-
1 September 2019	Liverpool	UK	Sefton Park	-
3 September 2019	London	UK	Coal Drops Yard	-
Asia
5 September 2019	Tokyo	Japan	ELE	-
Europe
28 January 2020	Dublin	Ireland	3Olympia Theatre	Kali Claire
29 January 2020	Dublin	Ireland	3Olympia Theatre	Kali Claire
30 January 2020	Belfast	Northern Ireland	Ulster Hall	Kali Claire
1 February 2020	Glasgow	Scotland	O2 Academy	Kali Claire
2 February 2020	Leeds	UK	O2 Academy	Kali Claire
4 February 2020	Liverpool	UK	O2 Academy	Kali Claire
5 February 2020	Manchester	UK	O2 Victoria Warehouse	Kali Claire
7 February 2020	Nottingham	UK	Rock City	Kali Claire
11 February 2020	Birmingham	UK	O2 Academy	Kali Claire
12 February 2020	London	UK	Eventim Apollo	Kali Claire
21 February 2020	Madrid	Spain	Joy Eslava	Kali Claire
22 February 2020	Barcelona	Spain	La 2 de Apollo	Kali Claire
25 February 2020	Zurich	Switzerland	Plaza Club	Kali Claire
26 February 2020	Paris	France	Le Trianon	Kali Claire
28 February 2020	Brussels	Belgium	L’Orangerie du Botanique	Kali Claire
29 February 2020	Cologne	Germany	Gloria	Kali Claire
1 March 2020	Amsterdam	Netherlands	Melkweg (The Max)	Kali Claire
3 March 2020	Berlin	Germany	Kesselhaus	Kali Claire
4 March 2020	Hamburg	Germany	Mojo	Kali Claire
5 March 2020	Copenhagen	Denmark	Vega	Kali Claire

Cancelled shows - Festivals
Date	City	Country	Venue	Opening Act(s)/Festival	Reason
8 February 2020	Norwich	UK	UEA	Kali Claire	Illness
9 February 2020	Southampton	UK	O2 Guildhall	Kali Claire	Illness
24 February 2020	Milan	Italy	Magazzini Generali	Kali Claire	COVID-19 pandemic
8 March 2020	Oslo	Norway	Rockefeller	Kali Claire	COVID-19 pandemic
4 June 2020	Barcelona	Spain	Parc del Forum	-	COVID-19 pandemic
19 June 2020	Landgraaf	Netherlands	Megaland	-	COVID-19 pandemic
25-29 June 2020	Pilton	UK	Worthy Farm	-	COVID-19 pandemic
2 July 2020	Werchter	Belgium	Festivalpark	-	COVID-19 pandemic
3 July 2020	Dublin	Ireland	Marlay Park	-	COVID-19 pandemic
5 August 2020	Budapest	Hungary	Óbudai-sziget	-	COVID-19 pandemic
9 August 2020	Newquay	UK	Fistral Beach and Watergate Bay	-	COVID-19 pandemic
14 August 2020	Helsinki	Finland	Suvilahti	-	COVID-19 pandemic
28 August 2020	Leeds	UK	Bramham Park	-	COVID-19 pandemic
29 August 2020	Reading	UK	Little Johny's Park	-	COVID-19 pandemic
4 September 2020	County Laois	Ireland	Stradbally Hall	-	COVID-19 pandemic
5-6 September 2020	Berlin	Germany	Olympiapark	-	COVID-19 pandemic

== Track listing ==
Credits adapted from the album liner notes.

No.	Title	Writer(s)	Producer(s)	Length
1.	"High Expectations (Intro)"	Mabel McVey; Tre Jean-Marie; Joel Compass	Jean-Marie	1:27
2.	"Bad Behaviour"	McVey; Marlon Roudette; Andrew Hershey	Dre Skull; WILDLIFE!^{[a]}; Cameron Gower Poole^{[b]}	3:25
3.	"Don't Call Me Up"	McVey; Camille Purcell; Steve Mac	Mac	2:58
4.	"FML"	McVey; Warren Oak Felder; Roudette; Sarah Aarons; Kelly Kiara	Oak	3:42
5.	"We Don't Say..."	McVey; Alexander Shuckburgh; Kiara	Al Shux	3:41
6.	"Selfish Love" (featuring Kamille)	McVey; Fraser Thorneycroft-Smith; Purcell	Fraser T. Smith	3:12
7.	"Lucky (Interlude)"	McVey; Jordan Riley; Roudette	Jordan Riley	1:14
8.	"Mad Love"	McVey; Mac; Purcell	Mac	2:49
9.	"Trouble"	McVey; Michael Hannides; Anthony Hannides; Lewis Allen	MakeYouKnowLove	3:28
10.	"Put Your Name on It"	McVey; Thornycroft-Smith; Tyrrell Demetrius Paul	Smith; 169	3:41
11.	"Stckhlm Syndrome (Interlude)"	McVey; Kiara; Oliver Dickinson; James David; Maxwell Bidstrup	Snakehips; MXXWLL; Gower Poole^{[b]}	2:25
12.	"OK (Anxiety Anthem)"	McVey; Uzoechi Emenike; Maria Hazell	MNEK; Koz; Leo Kalyan^{[a]}; Gower Poole^{[b]}	3:36
13.	"I Belong to Me"	McVey; James Napier	Riley	2:38
14.	"High Expectations (Outro)"	McVey; Compass; Jean-Marie	Jean-Marie	2:25
Total length:				41:41

Bonus tracks
No.	Title	Writer(s)	Producer(s)	Length
15.	"Finders Keepers" (featuring Kojo Funds)	McVey; Jordan D Reid; Errol Bellot; Stephen Marsden; Roudette	JD. Reid	4:28
16.	"Fine Line" (featuring Not3s)	McVey; Reid; Roudette; Lukman Odunaike	Reid	3:32
17.	"My Lover" (with Not3s)	Odunaike; McVey	Jay Weathers; Alistair "AoD" O'Donnell^{[a]}	3:12
18.	"Ring Ring" (with Jax Jones featuring Rich the Kid)	Timicin Aluo; Mark Ralph; McVey; Roudette; Purcell; Emenike	Jax Jones; Ralph^{[c]}	3:38
19.	"Cigarette" (with Raye and Stefflon Don)	Rachel Keen; Te Whiti Warbrick; Nicholas Audino; Lewis Hughes; Ryan Vojtesak; McVey; Stephanie Allen	Twice as Nice; Charlie Handsome	3:08
20.	"Not Sayin'"	McVey; Josh Crocker; Kiara; Reid; Compass	Reid; Crocker; Gower Poole^{[b]}	3:43
Total length:				61:22

Japanese CD bonus tracks
No.	Title	Writer(s)	Producer(s)	Length
21.	"Don't Call Me Up" (R3hab remix)	McVey; Mac; Purcell	Mac	2:33
22.	"One Shot"	McVey; Kiara; Gabriel Kusimo; Reid	GA; Reid	3:55
23.	"Thinking of You"	McVey; Joel Pott	Pott	3:34
Total length:				71:24

Digital reissue bonus tracks
No.	Title	Writer(s)	Producer(s)	Length
15.	"Boyfriend"	Purcell; McVey; Marlena Shaw; Richard Evans; Robert Miller; Mac	Mac	3:45
22.	"God Is a Dancer" (with Tiësto)	Violet Skies; Verwest; Josh Wilkinson	Tiësto; Wilkinson	2:48
23.	"West Ten" (with AJ Tracey)	AJ Tracey; Fred; Purcell; McVey; Take A Daytrip	Fred; Take A Daytrip	3:33
24.	"Tick Tock" (with Clean Bandit featuring 24kGoldn)	Golden Landis Von Jones; Grace Chatto; Jack Patterson; Camille Purcell; Mabel McVey	Jack Patterson; Mark Ralph; Grace Chatto	2:58
Total length:				67:55

Notes

- ^{^[a]} signifies an additional producer
- ^{^[b]} signifies a vocal producer
- ^{^[c]} signifies a co-producer
- Before the final digital reissue, there was a first reissue with "God Is a Dancer" added as track one (track 21 on certain listings), and later a second reissue with "Boyfriend" as track one (or track 15), with "God Is a Dancer" as track 22.
- "Tick Tock" and "West Ten" are placed as tracks one and two on the digital reissue exclusively for Spotify, with all other tracks being two positions lower in the track list.

== Personnel ==
Credits for High Expectations adapted from Allmusic.

=== Performers and vocals ===
- Mabel – primary artist, vocals (all tracks)
- Kamille – background vocals (tracks 3, 8), additional vocals (track 18), featured vocals (track 6)
- Kojo Funds – vocals (track 15)
- Not3s – vocals (tracks 16–17)
- Rich the Kid – vocals (track 18)
- Raye – vocals (track 19)
- Stefflon Don – vocals (track 19)
- Anthony Hannides – background vocals (track 9)
- Michael Hannides – background vocals, piano, drums (track 9)
- 169 – background vocals, drum programming, keyboards (track 10)
- MNEK – background vocals, keyboards, drum programming (track 12), additional vocals (track 18)
- Kali Claire McLoughlin – background vocals (track 17)
- Nick Trygstad – cello (tracks 1, 14)
- Simon Turner – cello (tracks 1, 14)
- Paulette Bayley – violin (tracks 1, 14)
- Peter Whitfield – violin (tracks 1, 14)
- Sarah Brandwood-Spencer – violin (tracks 1, 14)
- Tre Jean-Marie – bass, piano, strings, synthesizer (tracks 1, 14)
- Josh Werner – bass guitar (track 2)
- Chris Laws – drums (tracks 3, 8)
- Steve Mac – keyboards (tracks 3, 8)
- Tim Laws – guitar (tracks 3, 8)
- Al Shux – bass, drums, keys (track 5)
- Fraser T. Smith – drum programming (tracks 6, 10), keyboards (track 10)
- Jordan Riley – drums, keyboards (tracks 7, 13), synthesizer programming (track 7), bass, piano (track 13)
- Lewis Allen – guitar (track 9)
- Leo Kalyan – (drums and keys) programming (track 12)
- Stephen Kozmeniuk – drums, strings (track 12)
- Jimmy Napes – piano (track 13)
- Marlon Roudette – electric guitar (track 16)
- Alastair "AoD" O'Donnell – guitar (track 17)
- Timucin Lam – all instruments (track 18)
- Twice as Nice – drum, synthesizer programming (track 19)
- Charlie Handsome – synthesizer programming, drums (track 19)
- Josh Crocker – drums, keyboards (track 20)

=== Production ===
- Tre Jean-Marie – production (tracks 1, 14)
- Dre Skull – production (track 2)
- WILDLIFE! – additional production (track 2)
- Cameron Gower Poole – (additional) vocal production (tracks 2, 11–12)
- Steve Mac – production (tracks 3, 8, 21(bonus))
- Oak – production (track 4)
- Al Shux – production (track 5)
- Fraser T. Smith – production (tracks 6, 10)
- Jordan Riley – production (tracks 7, 13)
- MakeYouKnowLove – production (track 9)
- Tyrell Paul – production (track 10)
- Snakehips – production (track 11)
- MXXWLL – production (track 11)
- MNEK – production (track 12)
- KOZ – production (track 12)
- Leo Kalyan – additional production (track 12)
- JD. Reid – production (tracks 15–16, 20, 22(bonus))
- Alastair "AoD" O'Donnell – additional production (track 17)
- Jay Weathers – production (track 17)
- Jax Jones – production (track 18)
- Mark Ralph – co-production (track 18)
- Twice as Nice – production (track 19)
- Charlie Handsome – production (track 19)
- Josh Crocker – production (track 20)
- GA – production (track 22(bonus))
- Joel Pott – production (track 23(bonus))

=== Technical ===
- Tre Jean-Marie – programming (tracks 1, 14)
- Nosa Apollo – programming (tracks 1, 14)
- Geoff Swan – mixing (tracks 1, 7, 14–15)
- Lewis Chapman – assistant mixing (tracks 1, 14)
- Bill Zimmerman – additional engineering (tracks 2, 5)
- Phil Tan – mixing (tracks 2, 5)
- Dan Pursey – engineering (tracks 3, 8)
- Chris Laws – engineering (tracks 3, 8)
- Mark "Spike" Stent – mixing (tracks 3–4, 8–9, 12)
- Al Shux – recording (track 5)
- Manny Marroquin – mixing (track 6)
- Chris Galland – engineering (track 6)
- Jordan Riley – recording (track 7)
- Niko Battistini – mix assistant (track 7)
- Michael Freeman – mix assistant (track 9)
- Wez Clarke – additional programming (tracks 10, 13, 20), mixing (tracks 10, 13, 16, 20)
- Cameron Gower Poole – mixing (track 11), recording (track 12)
- MNEK – background vocals recording (track 12)
- Matt Snell – assistant engineering (track 12)
- JD. Reid – engineering (track 15), programming (tracks 15–16)
- Jay Weathers – engineering (track 17)
- Mike Spencer – additional engineering, mixing (track 17)
- Mark Ralph – mixing (track 18)
- Jamie Snell – editing (track 18)
- Dan Parry – mixing (track 19)
- Josh Crocker – programming (track 20)

=== Artwork ===
- Mariano Vivanco – photography
- Ted Lovett (Studio) – art direction and design

== Charts ==
=== Weekly charts ===
Chart (2019)	Peak position
Australian Albums (ARIA)	70
Belgian Albums (Ultratop Flanders)	50
Belgian Albums (Ultratop Wallonia)	165
Canadian Albums (Billboard)	47
Dutch Albums (Album Top 100)	41
French Albums (SNEP)	80
German Albums (Offizielle Top 100)	58
Greek Albums (IFPI)	72
Irish Albums (IRMA)	5
Lithuanian Albums (AGATA)	82
Norwegian Albums (VG-lista)	37
Scottish Albums (Official Charts)	5
Spanish Albums (PROMUSICAE)	98
Swiss Albums (Schweizer Hitparade)	29
UK Albums (Official Charts)	3
US Billboard 200	198

=== Year-end charts ===
Chart (2019)	Position
UK Albums (OCC)	83

Chart (2020)	Position
Irish Albums (IRMA)	21
UK Albums (OCC)	16

Chart (2021)	Position
Irish Albums (IRMA)	49
UK Albums (OCC)	35

== Certifications ==
Region	Certification	Certified units/sales
France (SNEP)	Gold	50,000^{‡}
New Zealand (RMNZ)	Gold	7,500^{‡}
Poland (ZPAV)	Platinum	20,000^{‡}
United Kingdom (BPI)	Platinum	300,000^{‡}
^{‡} Sales+streaming figures based on certification alone.

== Release history ==
Region	Date	Format	Label	Ref.
Various	2 August 2019	CD; cassette; digital download; LP	Polydor UK	
Various	22 August 2019	LP (blue)	Polydor UK	
Japan	4 September 2019	CD	Universal	

== High Expectations... Stripped ==
High Expectations... Stripped is an acoustic version of the album recorded by Mabel at her home studio during the COVID-19 lockdowns. The album was released on 31 July 2020.

Mabel announced the album on 28 July 2020, saying "This year turned everyone's plans sideways and I’ve been using the time in my home studio to record an acoustic version of every track. Something a bit more intimate from me".

=== Track listing ===
High Expectations... Stripped
No.	Title	Length
1.	"High Expectations (Intro)" (Stripped)	2:05
2.	"Bad Behaviour" (Stripped)	3:05
3.	"Don't Call Me Up" (Stripped)	3:14
4.	"FML" (Stripped)	3:53
5.	"We Don't Say..." (Stripped)	3:15
6.	"Selfish Love" (Stripped)	3:24
7.	"Lucky (Interlude)" (Stripped)	1:23
8.	"Mad Love" (Stripped)	3:04
9.	"Trouble" (Stripped)	3:46
10.	"Put Your Name On It" (Stripped)	3:17
11.	"Stckhlm Syndrome (Interlude)" (Stripped)	2:29
12.	"OK (Anxiety Anthem)" (Stripped)	3:52
13.	"I Belong to Me" (Stripped)	2:44
14.	"High Expectations (Outro)" (Stripped)	2:36

== See also ==
- List of 2019 albums
- List of UK top-ten albums in 2019
