= Top Winners =

Single by Tinie featuring Not3s
- Released: 16 March 2020
- Recorded: 2019
- Length: 2:51
- Label: Disturbing London Records; Parlophone; Warner Music
- Songwriter(s): Emile Laurent; Luke Odunaike; Patrick Okogwu; Victor Samuel
- Producer(s): Emile Laurent; Remedee; Richie Montana; Slic Vic

Tinie singles chronology
"Bancomat" (2018)	"Top Winners" (2020)	"Moncler" (2020)

Not3s singles chronology
"Princ3" (2019)	"Top Winners" (2020)

"Top Winners" is a song by British rapper Tinie featuring vocals from British singer-songwriter and rapper Not3s. The song was released as a single on 16 March 2020. The song peaked at number sixty-four on the UK Singles Chart. The song was written by Emile Laurent, Luke Odunaike, Patrick Okogwu and Victor Samuel.

== Background ==
The song premiered on BBC Radio 1 as Annie Mac's Hottest Record in The World. Talking about the song, Tinie Tempah said, "I made this record with Not3s because it's about a 'Winners' mindset and mentality. Having that outlook has kept us focused – it's the reason I am where I am, and the reason Not3s is where he is. It's all about striving to achieve more and continue to do better for yourself."

== Music video ==
A music video to accompany the release of "Top Winners" was first released onto YouTube on 16 March 2020. The video show Tinie Tempah and Not3s perform playfully to the camera in a colourful rotating room.

== Personnel ==
Credits adapted from Tidal.

- Emile Laurent – producer, programmer, writer
- Remedee – producer, programmer
- Richie Montana – producer, programmer
- Slic Vic – producer, programmer
- Chris Gehringer – mastering
- Wez Clarke – mixing
- Luke Odunaike – vocals, writer
- Patrick Okogwu – vocals, writer
- Victor Samuel – writer

== Charts ==
Chart (2020)	Peak position
UK Singles (OCC)	64

== Release history ==
Region	Date	Format	Label
United Kingdom	16 March 2020	Digital download; streaming	Disturbing London Records; Parlophone; Warner Music
