= Ivy to Roses =

2017 mixtape by Mabel

- 2018 and 2019 reissues

Mixtape by Mabel
- Released: 13 October 2017
- Genre: R&B
- Length: 45:56
- Label: Polydor
- Producer: JD Reid; Josh Crocker; Joel Pott; Steve Mac; GA; Jay Weathers; Alistair O'Donnell; Jax Jones; Mark Ralph; Twice as Nice; Charlie Handsome; Cameron Gower Poole; Bless Beats; Kito; Joel Compass; Tre Jean-Marie

Mabel chronology
Bedroom EP (2016)	Ivy to Roses (2017)	High Expectations (2019)

Singles from Ivy to Roses
- 1. "Begging" Released: 11 October 2017

Ivy to Roses is the debut mixtape by English singer Mabel. It was originally released on 13 October 2017 through Polydor. This was followed by a reissue on 5 October 2018, with a new cover art and a new track list. The album's original release spawned one single, "Begging", while also including the top ten hit "Finders Keepers". The reissue features several previously released collaborations including "My Lover" and "Ring Ring".

== Singles ==
=== Original release ===
The original release of Ivy to Roses features "Finders Keepers" and "Begging". The track, "Finders Keepers", was released on 26 May 2017, as part of her Bedroom EP. The song was released as a mainstream single in August 2017, with an accompanying music video. In November 2017, the song impacted the UK Singles Chart, and was certified platinum. The song also charted in Ireland and Scotland. The lead single, "Begging", was released shortly afterwards, but failed to chart.

=== Reissues ===
The 5 October 2018 digital reissue release of Ivy to Roses features four singles released subsequent to the original release. These include "My Lover" (with Not3s), "Fine Line" (featuring Not3s), "Ring Ring" (with Jax Jones and Rich the Kid), and "One Shot".

On 18 January 2019, "Don’t Call Me Up" was released as a single along with a second digital reissue of Ivy to Roses, a vinyl release of the first reissue was also released the same day, "Don't Call Me Up" debuted at 11 and later reaching a peak of 3 on the UK charts, as well as earning the number 1 spot on the UK Official Trending charts. This new digital reissue also includes the collaboration "Cigarette" (with Raye and Stefflon Don). Following charting at 14 in the UK, "My Lover" was certified platinum. Mabel's other certifications also include "Fine Line" being gold, "Cigarette" being silver and "Ring Ring" being silver.

== Track listing ==
Ivy to Roses – Standard release (2017)
No.	Title	Writer(s)	Producer(s)	Length
1.	"Come Over"	Mabel McVey; Joel Pott	Crocker; Pott^{[a]}	4:14
2.	"Begging"	McVey; Crocker; Pott	Crocker	3:18
3.	"Finders Keepers" (featuring Kojo Funds)	McVey; Jordan D Reid; Marlon Roudette; Errol Bellot; Stephen Marsden	JD Reid	4:29
4.	"Ivy"	McVey; Cameron Gower Poole; Thomas Hull; Brian Kennedy	Poole	3:30
5.	"Low Key"	McVey; Pott	Pott; Bless Beats; Kito	3:49
6.	"Roses"	McVey; Crocker; Kelly Richardson	Crocker	3:50
7.	"Weapon"	McVey; Lloyd Hinshelwood; Joel Compass	Compass	3:04
8.	"Passionfruit"	Aubrey Graham; Noah "40" Shebib; Nana Rogues	Tre Jean-Marie	3:02
9.	"Finders Keepers" (featuring Kojo Funds, Burna Boy & Don-E)	McVey; Reid; McVey-Roudette; Bellot; Marsden	Reid	4:28
Total length:				33:44

Ivy to Roses – First digital reissue and vinyl release (2018)
No.	Title	Writer(s)	Producer(s)	Length
1.	"One Shot"	McVey; Gabriel "GA" Gusimo; Jordan D Reid; Kelly Richardson	GA; JD Reid^{[b]}	3:52
2.	"Fine Line" (featuring Not3s)	McVey; Reid; Marlon McVey-Roudette; Lukman Odunaike	JD Reid	3:31
3.	"Finders Keepers" (featuring Kojo Funds)	McVey; Reid; McVey-Roudette; Errol Bellot; Stephen Marsden	JD Reid	4:28
4.	"My Lover" (with Not3s)	Odunaike; McVey	Jay Weathers; Alistair O'Donnell	3:12
5.	"Ring Ring" (Jax Jones featuring Mabel and Rich the Kid)	Timucin Aluo; Uzoechi Emenike; Mark Ralph; Camille Purcell; McVey; McVey-Roudette	Jax Jones; Ralph	3:37
6.	"Ivy"	McVey; Cameron Gower Poole; Thomas Hull; Brian Kennedy	Poole	3:30
7.	"Come Over"	McVey; Joel Pott	Crocker; Pott^{[a]}	4:14
8.	"Begging"	McVey; Crocker; Pott	Crocker	3:18
9.	"Low Key"	McVey; Pott	Pott; Bless Beats; Kito	3:49
10.	"Roses"	McVey; Crocker; Richardson	Crocker	3:50
11.	"Weapon"	McVey; Lloyd Hinshelwood; Joel Compass	Compass	3:04
12.	"Passionfruit"	Aubrey Graham; Noah "40" Shebib; Nana Rogues	Tre Jean-Marie	3:02
13.	"Finders Keepers" (featuring Kojo Funds, Burna Boy & Don-E)	McVey; Reid; McVey-Roudette; Marsden	JD Reid	4:28
Total length:				40:05

Ivy to Roses – Second digital reissue (2019)
No.	Title	Writer(s)	Producer(s)	Length
1.	"Don't Call Me Up"	Mabel McVey; Steve McCutcheon; Camille Purcell	Steve Mac	2:58
2.	"One Shot"	McVey; Gabriel "GA" Gusimo; Jordan D Reid; Kelly Richardson	GA; JD Reid^{[b]}	3:52
3.	"Fine Line" (featuring Not3s)	McVey; Reid; Marlon McVey-Roudette; Lukman Odunaike	JD Reid	3:31
4.	"Finders Keepers" (featuring Kojo Funds)	McVey; Reid; McVey-Roudette; Errol Bellot; Stephen Marsden	JD Reid	4:28
5.	"My Lover" (with Not3s)	Odunaike; McVey	Jay Weathers; Alistair O'Donnell	3:12
6.	"Ring Ring" (Jax Jones featuring Mabel and Rich the Kid)	Timucin Aluo; Uzoechi Emenike; Mark Ralph; Camille Purcell; McVey; McVey-Roudette	Jax Jones; Ralph	3:37
7.	"Cigarette" (with Raye and Stefflon Don)	Sickdrumz; Raye; Lewis Hughes; Nicholas Audino; Charlie Handsome	Twice as Nice; Charlie Handsome	3:07
8.	"Ivy"	McVey; Cameron Gower Poole; Thomas Hull; Brian Kennedy	Poole	3:30
9.	"Come Over"	McVey; Joel Pott	Crocker; Pott^{[a]}	4:14
10.	"Begging"	McVey; Crocker; Pott	Crocker	3:18
11.	"Low Key"	McVey; Pott	Pott; Bless Beats; Kito	3:49
12.	"Roses"	McVey; Crocker; Richardson	Crocker	3:50
13.	"Weapon"	McVey; Lloyd Hinshelwood; Joel Compass	Compass	3:04
14.	"Passionfruit"	Aubrey Graham; Noah "40" Shebib; Nana Rogues	Tre Jean-Marie	3:02
15.	"Finders Keepers" (featuring Kojo Funds, Burna Boy & Don-E)	McVey; Reid; McVey-Roudette; Marsden	JD Reid	4:28
Total length:				45:56

== Charts ==
=== Weekly charts ===
Chart (2019)	Peak position
Canadian Albums (Billboard)	83
Danish Albums (Hitlisten)	32
French Albums (SNEP)	128
Irish Albums (IRMA)	58
Lithuanian Albums (AGATA)	95
UK Albums (OCC)	28

=== Year-end charts ===
Chart (2019)	Position
UK Albums (OCC)	68

== Certifications ==
Region	Certification	Certified units/sales
Denmark (IFPI Danmark)	Gold	10,000^{‡}
United Kingdom (BPI)	Gold	100,000^{‡}
^{‡} Sales+streaming figures based on certification alone.
