= Don't Call Me Up =

2019 single by Mabel

Single by Mabel

from the album High Expectations
- Released: 18 January 2019
- Recorded: 2018
- Genre: R&B; pop; tropical house
- Length: 2:58
- Label: Polydor; Capitol
- Songwriters: Mabel McVey; Camille Purcell; Steve Mac
- Producer: Steve Mac

Mabel singles chronology
"One Shot" (2018)	"Don't Call Me Up" (2019)	"Mad Love" (2019)

Music video
- "Don't Call Me Up" on YouTube

"Don't Call Me Up" is a song by the English singer Mabel, included on the 2019 reissue of her debut mixtape, Ivy to Roses, and released as the lead single from her first full-length album, High Expectations. It was released by Polydor Records on 18 January 2019. Mabel co-wrote "Don't Call Me Up" with Camille Purcell and the song's producer Steve Mac. Feeling sad about a previous relationship, Mabel wanted to write a positive breakup song to feel better. It is a tropical house and pop song.

Upon release, "Don't Call Me Up" was well received by most music critics and was also a commercial success. It peaked at number three for three consecutive weeks in Mabel's native UK making it Mabel's highest-charting single on the chart. The track also topped the UK R&B Chart for ten consecutive weeks, tying "Old Town Road as the longest running number-one of 2019. In has since been certified triple platinum for selling 1,800,000 units in the UK. In the United States, "Don't Call Me Up" became Mabel's first single to enter the Billboard Hot 100. It eventually reached a peak of number 66 respectively. "Don't Call Me Up" also reached the top 20 on other US charts, peaking at number 16 on the Billboard Mainstream Top 40 airplay chart and number 18 on the Billboard Dance Club Songs.

The song has reached the top ten on a total of 32 charts since its release and has become the biggest hit of Mabel's career. As of February 2026, the music video has over 380 million views on YouTube, making it her most-viewed video on the platform.

== Writing and recording ==
Mabel wrote "Don't Call Me Up" with Camille Purcell, and Steve Mac, who also produced the song. Unlike her previous writing and recording sessions, Mabel only had one day to work with Mac and Purcell, and the recording excluded the harmonies and ad-libs common in her previous material. She went into the session feeling sad about a previous relationship and wanted to write a positive breakup song to feel better.

The song stemmed from the refrain's "Don't Call Me Up" hook which was brought up during a discussion they had about ignoring a phone call from a former lover and how good that felt. Finding the hook simple and relatable, they decided to use it in the verses as well. It was the first song Mabel recorded where her lead vocals from the final and demo versions sounded nearly identical.

== Music and lyrics ==
Written in the key of B Dorian mode, "Don't Call Me Up" runs at a tempo of 99 beats per minute. It is a tropical house pop song with bounce and bass-heavy production, and dancehall and R&B undertones. The track has a midtempo dance groove. Mabel starts the first verse one second into the song accompanied by a three side-clave keyboard riff introducing the main chord progression of Bm–A–E. The chord sequence changes to Dmaj7–A–E in the pre-chorus, while Mabel's vocal increases from A to C♯. Conversely, she performs in a monotonous style in the chorus, and her vocals have a parallel lower octave with additional Auto-Tune. A reggaeton groove is introduced in the chorus with an extended reverberation percussive hit, and a single D chord is played for two full measures at the end.

In the second verse, a high snare drum plays a frequent two and four backbeat before reintroducing the kick drum which dominates the second pre-chorus. Cabasa, handclaps, and shakers are added in this section, ahead of the second chorus that includes a snare drum triplet fill in the final measure. The breakdown has the same music as the chorus, but uses a heavily pitch shifted vocal doubled with an octave halfway through. In the final pre-chorus, a high-pass filter cuts bass frequencies while the final chorus keyboard riff is doubled and a shaker is added.

According to Mabel, the track is about being strong and saying, "no, you had your chance", after a breakup with someone who took you for granted and started to call you again. She explained that it is "where you give everything to a relationship but they don't appreciate you back. You get to the point, 'That's it, walk away.'"

== Release ==
Prior to its Polydor Records single release on 18 January 2019, Mabel debuted "Don't Call Me Up" live during her These Are the Best Times Tour in December 2018. On 22 January 2019, the single was promoted with its own lens filter on Snapchat. Capitol Records sent the song to contemporary hit radio in the US on 19 February 2019. In Italy, it impacted mainstream radio on 22 February 2019. A remixes extended play (EP) was released the same day. On 1 March 2019, an acoustic version was made available.

== Critical reception ==
Upon release, "Don't Call Me Up" was well received by most music critics. In his review for Clash, Robin Murray called the song Mabel's "most potent pop moment yet", noting her "surging vocal, and the addictive, nuanced songwriting". The Line of Best Fit's Cerys Kenneally found the track "huge" and said it "ignites that Friday feeling", while a reviewer for DIY deemed it "a bit of an empowerment anthem". Roisin O'Connor, a music correspondent for The Independent, included the song in her list of favourite new releases, calling it "a self-love banger". In The Times, Ed Potton described the track as "an ex-slaying epic of mega-lunged pop melodies". Writing for The Sunday Times, Dan Cairns regarded "Don't Call Me Up" as "a hook-filled kiss-off that's both anthemic and irrefutable."

Billboard named it an early contender for song of the summer in the US with writer Gab Ginsberg likening its "infectious" beat to Ed Sheeran's "Shape of You" and its empowerment message to "New Rules" by Dua Lipa. Glenn Gamboa of Newsday said the groove is similar to "Shape of You", but its attitude "sets it apart" and Mabel "definitely knows how to deliver a kiss-off." In a less favourable review, Michael Cragg of The Guardian found the pre-chorus "exquisite" but the song too "risk-free", and said it "rips [off]" the "plinky-plonky" beat from "Shape of You".

== Commercial performance ==
"Don't Call Me Up" became the biggest hit of Mabel's career. Following its release, the track debuted at number 11 on the UK Singles Chart with first-week sales of 23,325 units. It rose four spots to number seven in its second week, before entering the top five in its third, holding the fifth position for four consecutive weeks. "Don't Call Me Up" eventually peaked at number three for three consecutive weeks in March 2019, making it Mabel's highest-charting single in the UK and her second to reach the top ten following 2017's "Finders Keepers". The track also topped the UK R&B Chart for ten consecutive weeks, tying "Old Town Road" as the longest running number-one of 2019. In April 2019, the song was certified gold by the British Phonographic Industry (BPI) for selling 400,000 units, and in 2022 it was certified triple platinum for selling 1,800,000 units.

In the United States, "Don't Call Me Up" became Mabel's first single to enter the Billboard Hot 100. The song initially debuted at number 21 on the Bubbling Under Hot 100 chart before entering the Hot 100 two weeks later, where it debuted at number 97 with 12.3 million radio impressions, six million streams, and 3,000 digital downloads sold on the chart issue dated April 2, 2019. The track moved up to number 92 in its second week and reached a peak of number 66 on the issue dated May 25, 2019. "Don't Call Me Up" also peaked at number 16 on the Billboard Mainstream Top 40 airplay chart and number 18 on the Billboard Dance Club Songs.

== Music video ==
Mabel first teased the music video for "Don't Call Me Up" by posting two GIFs from the clip on Twitter (X) on 14 January 2019. She shared another image from video on 16 January 2019. The following day, Mabel released a preview of the clip and hosted a live chat on YouTube, ahead of the music video's premiere on the platform at 08:00 GMT on 18 January 2019. According to Sajae Elder of The Fader, "the colorful clip finds the singer surrounded by a gang of her girls, dancing through parking lots, joyriding and smashing phones to help with the heartbreak."

== Live performances ==
On 13 February 2019, Mabel performed "Don't Call Me Up" and a cover of "Touch" by Little Mix for BBC Radio 1's Live Lounge. She performed the song on Norwegian-Swedish television programme Skavlan on 22 February 2019. On 7 March 2019, the singer performed the track along with "Fine Line" at the 2019 Global Awards. Mabel also performed "Don't Call Me Up" during the second series semi-final episode of Ireland's Got Talent on 30 March 2019. She performed the song on The Tonight Show Starring Jimmy Fallon on 22 May 2019. Mabel also performed "Don't Call Me Up" at the 2019 MTV Europe Music Awards and LOS40 Music Awards 2019. In 2020, she performed the song during The Brits are Coming in January. The song was also performed at the 2020 Brit Awards as the opening act for the award ceremony, where Mabel won her first ever BRIT Award. Following the performance the song climbed the UK Single Charts at #34, being the 46th week of the single on the UK Official Charts.

== Track listing ==
Digital download
No.	Title	Length
1.	"Don't Call Me Up"	2:58

Digital EP – Remixes
No.	Title	Length
1.	"Don't Call Me Up" (R3hab Remix)	2:33
2.	"Don't Call Me Up" (ADP Remix)	3:14
3.	"Don't Call Me Up" (Burak Yeter Remix)	3:12
4.	"Don't Call Me Up" (Zac Samuel Remix)	3:28
5.	"Don't Call Me Up" (Conducta Remix)	3:27

Digital download – Acoustic
No.	Title	Length
1.	"Don't Call Me Up" (acoustic)	3:32

== Personnel ==
- Mabel – vocals
- Steve Mac – production, keyboards
- Chris Laws – drums, engineering
- Spike Stent – mixing
- Stuart Hawkes – mastering
- Tim Laws – guitar
- Camille Purcell – background vocals
- Dan Pursey – engineering

Credits adapted from Qobuz.

== Charts ==
=== Weekly charts ===
Chart (2019)	Peak position
Australia (ARIA)	16
Austria (Ö3 Austria Top 40)	10
Belgium (Ultratop 50 Flanders)	2
Belgium (Ultratop 50 Wallonia)	5
Bulgaria (PROPHON)	4
Canada Hot 100 (Billboard)	29
Canada CHR/Top 40 (Billboard)	15
Canada Hot AC (Billboard)	44
Croatia (HRT)	7
Czech Republic Airplay (ČNS IFPI)	2
Czech Republic Singles Digital (ČNS IFPI)	20
Denmark (Tracklisten)	6
Estonia (Eesti Tipp-40)	8
Euro Digital Song Sales (Billboard)	8
Finland (Suomen virallinen lista)	6
France (SNEP)	20
Germany (GfK)	10
Germany Airplay (BVMI)	1
Greece International (IFPI)	6
Hungary (Rádiós Top 40)	1
Hungary (Single Top 40)	8
Hungary (Stream Top 40)	10
Iceland (Tónlistinn)	19
Ireland (IRMA)	3
Italy (FIMI)	17
Latvia (LAIPA)	12
Lithuania (AGATA)	8
Luxembourg Digital Song Sales (Billboard)	3
Mexico Ingles Airplay (Billboard)	6
Netherlands (Dutch Top 40)	2
Netherlands (Single Top 100)	2
New Zealand (Recorded Music NZ)	19
Norway (VG-lista)	3
Poland Airplay (ZPAV)	14
Portugal (AFP)	29
Romania (Airplay 100)	3
Russia Airplay (TopHit)	3
Scottish Singles Sales (Official Charts)	9
Slovakia Airplay (ČNS IFPI)	8
Slovakia Singles Digital (ČNS IFPI)	13
Slovenia (SloTop50)	4
Spain (Promusicae)	68
Sweden (Sverigetopplistan)	10
Switzerland (Schweizer Hitparade)	9
UK Singles (Official Charts)	3
UK Hip Hop/R&B (Official Charts)	1
US Billboard Hot 100	66
US Dance Club Songs (Billboard)	18
US Dance Airplay (Billboard)	19
US Pop Airplay (Billboard)	16

=== Year-end charts ===
Chart (2019)	Position
Australia (ARIA)	50
Austria (Ö3 Austria Top 40)	23
Belgium (Ultratop Flanders)	6
Belgium (Ultratop Wallonia)	14
Canada (Canadian Hot 100)	80
Denmark (Tracklisten)	17
France (SNEP)	47
Germany (Official German Charts)	18
Hungary (Rádiós Top 40)	20
Hungary (Single Top 40)	35
Iceland (Tónlistinn)	22
Ireland (IRMA)	16
Italy (FIMI)	53
Latvia (LAIPA)	68
Netherlands (Dutch Top 40)	9
Netherlands (Single Top 100)	11
Norway (VG-lista)	16
Poland (Polish Airplay Top 100)	53
Portugal (AFP)	67
Romania (Airplay 100)	14
Russia Airplay (Tophit)	20
Slovenia (SloTop50)	9
Sweden (Sverigetopplistan)	29
Switzerland (Schweizer Hitparade)	15
UK Singles (OCC)	9
Chart (2020)	Position
Hungary (Rádiós Top 40)	16
UK Singles (OCC)	93

== Certifications ==
Region	Certification	Certified units/sales
Australia (ARIA)	5× Platinum	350,000^{‡}
Austria (IFPI Austria)	Platinum	30,000^{‡}
Belgium (BRMA)	2× Platinum	80,000^{‡}
Brazil (Pro-Música Brasil)	Diamond	160,000^{‡}
Canada (Music Canada)	2× Platinum	160,000^{‡}
Denmark (IFPI Danmark)	2× Platinum	180,000^{‡}
France (SNEP)	Diamond	333,333^{‡}
Germany (BVMI)	3× Gold	600,000^{‡}
Italy (FIMI)	2× Platinum	100,000^{‡}
New Zealand (RMNZ)	3× Platinum	90,000^{‡}
Poland (ZPAV)	3× Platinum	150,000^{‡}
Portugal (AFP)	2× Platinum	20,000^{‡}
Spain (Promusicae)	2× Platinum	120,000^{‡}
United Kingdom (BPI)	4× Platinum	2,400,000^{‡}
United States (RIAA)	Platinum	1,000,000^{‡}
Streaming
Greece (IFPI Greece)	Platinum	2,000,000^{†}
Sweden (GLF)	Platinum	8,000,000^{†}
^{‡} Sales+streaming figures based on certification alone.^{†} Streaming-only figures based on certification alone.
