= One Shot (Mabel song) =

Single by Mabel
- Released: 31 August 2018
- Genre: Tropical pop; R&B
- Length: 3:55
- Label: Polydor
- Songwriters: Mabel McVey; Kelly Kiara; Gabriel Kusimo; Jordan D. Reid
- Producers: GA; JD. Reid

Mabel singles chronology
"Ring Ring" (2018)	"One Shot" (2018)	"Don't Call Me Up" (2019)

Music video
- "One Shot" on YouTube

"One Shot" is a song by English singer Mabel, included on the reissue of her debut mixtape Ivy to Roses. It was released by Polydor Records on 31 August 2018. "One Shot" peaked at number 44 on the UK Singles Chart.

== Writing and release ==
Mabel co-wrote "One Shot" with songwriter Kelly Richardson, and producer GA at the end of 2017; they finished the song in an hour. JD. Reid later provided additional production and thus also received a songwriting credit. After the release of her singles "Finders Keepers" and "Fine Line", Mabel "wanted to make another up-tempo, playful track that people could dance to." She recalled, "It was kind of what I had been looking for, like a progression from 'Finders Keepers' and 'Fine Line' that was still up-tempo but had some more attitude. 'Cause I think 'Fine Line' and 'Finders Keepers' are quite sweet, but I have a side to me that is quite sassy so I wanted to put that into a song."

"One Shot" became a crowd favourite during Mabel's summer festival performances, months prior to its single release. It was released by Polydor Records on 31 August 2018. On 21 September 2018, remixes by Alex Ross and Banx & Ranx were commissioned. A remix featuring verses by rappers Yungen and Avelino was released on 18 October 2018. An acoustic version was made available on 2 November 2018.

== Composition ==
"One Shot" is an up-tempo tropical pop, R&B song with a lightly propulsive rhythm. It is written in the key of D minor with a tempo of 109 beats per minute. The production features soft synths and steel drums. Michael Love Michael of Paper magazine describes it as a "warm, globally minded sonic palette" that combines "soulful vocals with playful wordplay."

Mabel said the lyrics are about "playing hard to get and knowing what you want. I do believe that when it comes to relationships that you have to set the bar high and know your worth so that you never settle, and that's what 'One Shot' is about." She explained that the song is also about being upfront with your love interest: "I think there is a misconception that being open and honest, and saying what it is you want is something we should be embarrassed about. But that's just not me. I am a very honest person, I always tell somebody what I am looking for, and I don't want people to waste my time basically."

== Reception ==
=== Critical response ===
"One Shot" was well received by music critics. Robin Murray of Clash magazine regarded the track as "a superb end to the summer, an instantly addictive return from a bold pop voice." In The Independent, Jake Hall touted it as "a guaranteed hit", highlighting its "sunny" steel drums as a "sonic continuation" of "Finders Keepers". Gary Ryan of NME described it as "a fizzing Jägerbomb of a track which is basically 'Finders Keepers' with a spray-job (if it ain't broke…)." Evening Standard critic Rick Pearson viewed the song as "a showcase for her low, soulful voice, inviting comparison with Dua Lipa."

=== Chart performance ===
In September 2018, "One Shot" debuted at number 57 on the UK Singles Chart with first-week sales of 7,737 units. It peaked at number 44 and spent 11 weeks on the chart. In Ireland, "One Shot" peaked at number 64 on the Irish Singles Chart and charted for a total of seven weeks.

== Track listing ==
Digital download
No.	Title	Length
1.	"One Shot"	3:55

Digital download – Remixes
No.	Title	Length
1.	"One Shot" (Alex Ross Remix)	3:21
2.	"One Shot" (Banx & Ranx Remix)	3:28

Digital download – Remix
No.	Title	Length
1.	"One Shot" (Remix) (with Yungen and Avelino)	3:43

Digital download – Acoustic Room Session
No.	Title	Length
1.	"One Shot" (Acoustic Room Session)	3:49

== Personnel ==
- GA – production
- JD. Reid – additional production
- Lorna Blackwood – vocal production
- Phil Tan – mixing
- Stuart Hawkes – mastering
- Cameron Gower Poole – vocal engineering

Credits adapted from Qobuz.

== Charts ==
Chart (2018)	Peak position
Ireland (IRMA)	64
UK Singles (OCC)	44

== Certifications ==
Region	Certification	Certified units/sales
United Kingdom (BPI)	Silver	200,000^{‡}
^{‡} Sales+streaming figures based on certification alone.
