= Demob Happy =

English alternative rock band

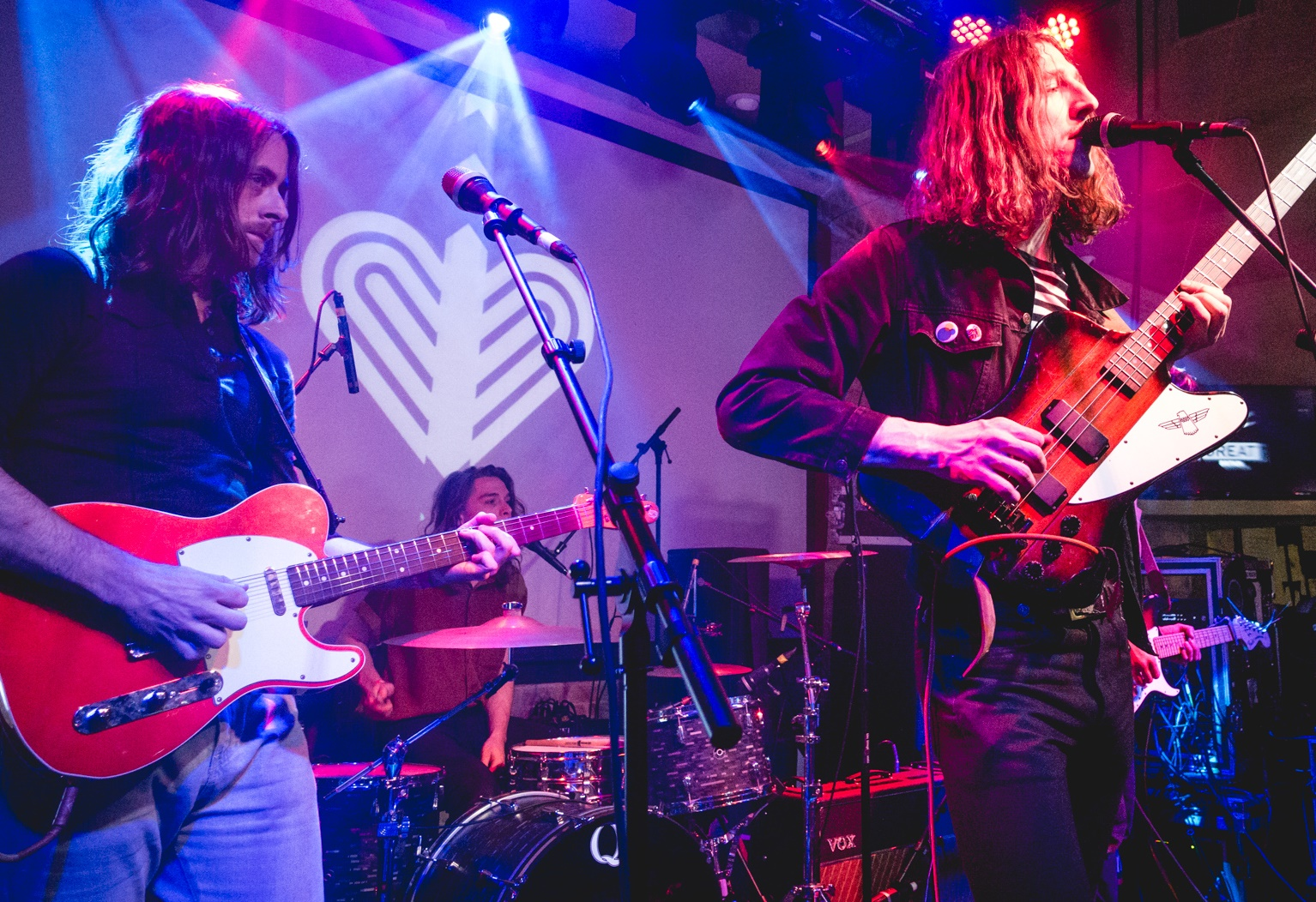
- Demob Happy live at SXSW March 2016

Background information
- Origin: Newcastle upon Tyne, England
- Genres: Alternative rock, indie rock
- Years active: 2008–present
- Labels: So Recordings; Taste & Tone; Milk Parlour Records
- Members: Matthew Marcantonio; Thomas Armstrong; Adam Godfrey
- Past members: Mathew Renforth
- Website: www.demob-happy.com

Demob Happy are an English alternative rock band, formed in 2008 in Newcastle upon Tyne and now based in Brighton. The band is composed of singer-bassist Matthew Marcantonio, drummer Thomas Armstrong and guitarist Adam Godfrey.

Originally a four-piece, the band's original lead guitarist Mathew Renforth left the band in mid-late 2016.

== History ==
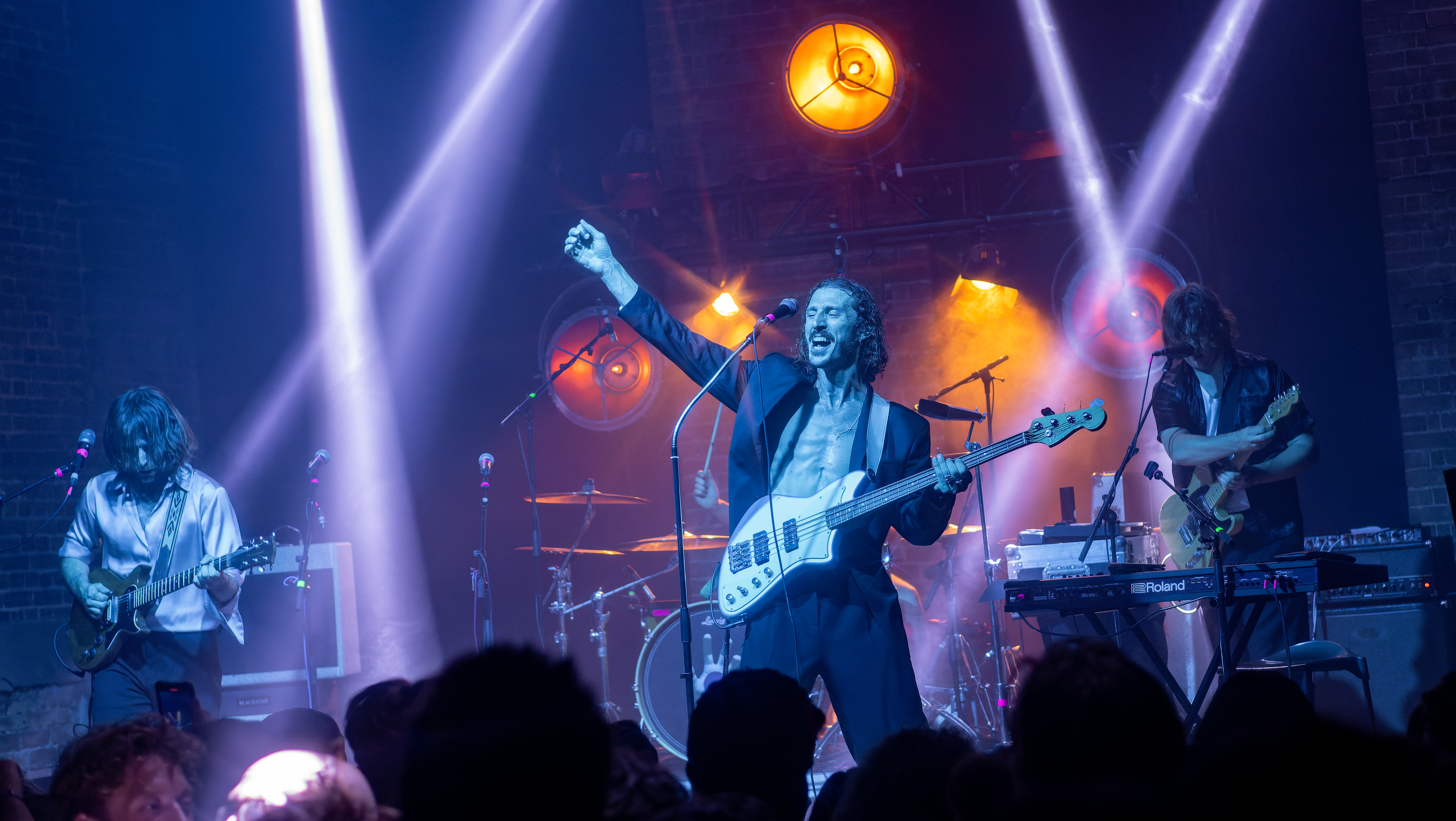
Demob Happy at the Village Underground - Thursday 14 September 2023

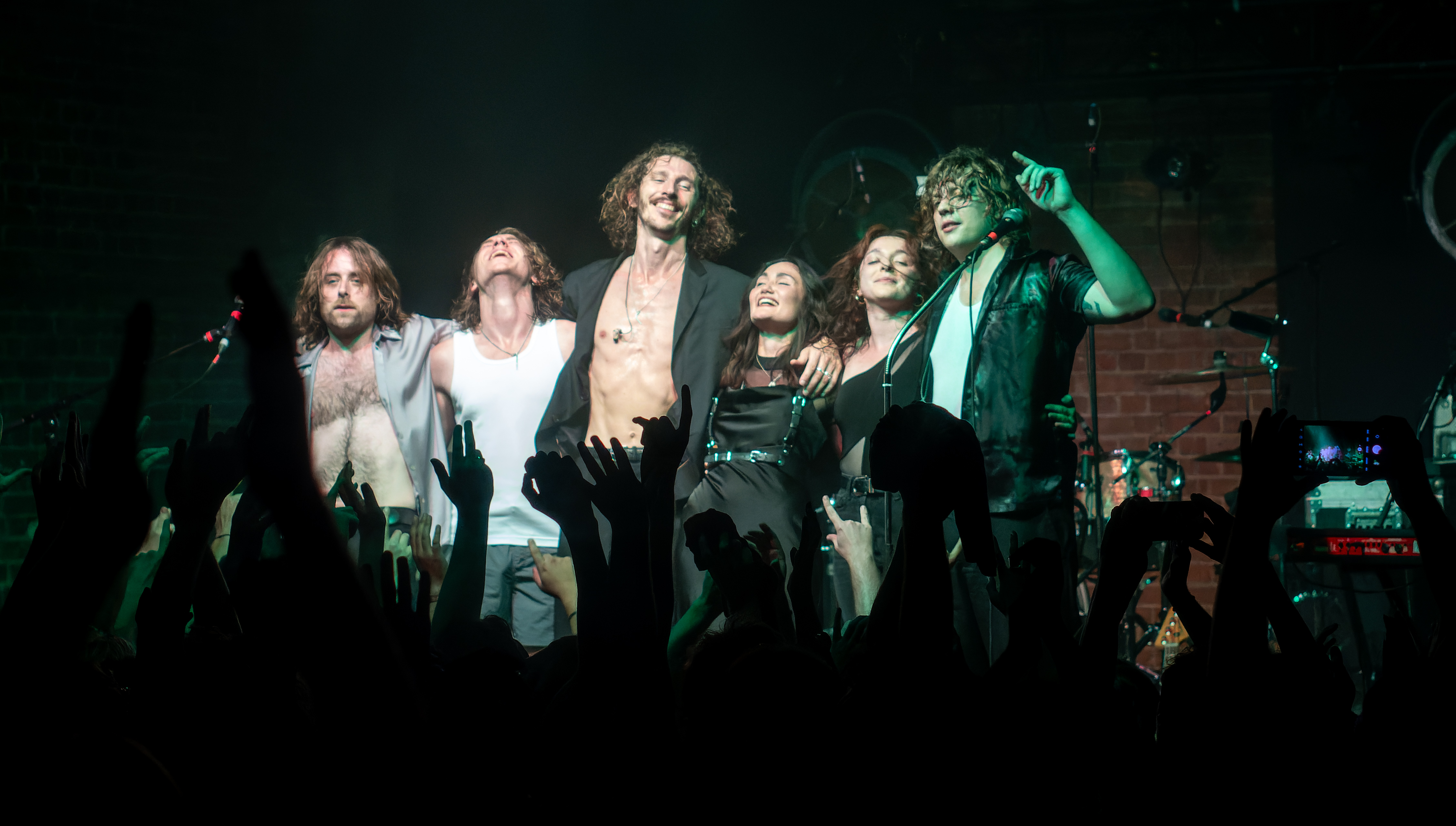
Demob Happy at the Village Underground - Thursday 14 September 2023

The band toured locally around their native Newcastle, before relocating south to Brighton a couple of years later as "there’s not enough of a music scene in Newcastle, so bands don’t get a lot of attention, although it’s a musical city". The band released their digital-only debut EP You Shook the Soul in May 2011 and follow up single Rattlesnake in February 2012.

They released their first physical release in the form of the 7" single Succubus in November 2014 via their own label Milk Parlour Records. In April 2015 the band released their first EP for new record label So Recordings in the form of the limited edition Record Store Day release Young & Numb EP on 10" vinyl. The band released their debut album Dream Soda in October 2015. The band co-own the Nowhere Man cafe in Brighton which is run by Marcantonio's brother Andrew where they also rehearse in the basement.

In October 2016, the band embarked on a co-headline tour with fellow-Brighton based band Tigercub as a three-piece. Lead guitarist Mathew Renforth's absence was not mentioned prior to or during the tour. The band officially confirmed their status as a 3-piece via Facebook when they uploaded a new press photo without Renforth present. The band released their new Tom Dalgety-produced single Dead Dreamers on 5 May 2017 via Atlantic Records imprint Taste & Tone.

On 23 March 2018, the band released their second album Holy Doom, which was preceded by the singles Be Your Man and Loosen It.

The band supported Jack White on the UK leg of his Boarding House Reach world tour in October 2018.

On 2 April 2021, the italian rapper Caparezza announced a featuring with Matthew Marcantonio in Canthology, the first track of his album Exuvia.

== Band members ==
=== Current members ===
- Matthew Marcantonio – lead vocals, bass
- Thomas Armstrong – drums, vocals
- Adam Godfrey – guitar, vocals

=== Former members ===
- Mathew Renforth – lead guitar

== Discography ==
=== Studio albums ===
- Dream Soda (2015), So Recordings
- Holy Doom (2018), So Recordings
- Divine Machines (2023), Liberator Music
- The Grown-Ups Are Talking (2026)

=== EPs/Singles ===
- "You Shook the Soul" (2011), Milk Parlour Records
- "Rattlesnake" (2012), Milk Parlour Records
- "Succubus" (2014), Milk Parlour Records
- Young & Numb EP (2015), Milk Parlour Records
- "Dead Dreamers" (2017), Taste & Tone
- "Be Your Man" (2017), SO Recordings
- "Fake Satan" (2017), SO Recordings
- "Loosen It" (2018), SO Recordings
- Holy Doom Unplugged EP (2018), SO Recordings
- "Less Is More" (2019), SO Recordings
- "Autoportrait" (2019), SO Recordings
- "Mother Machine" (2020), SO Recordings
- "Sympathy Boy"(2021), SO Recordings
- "Hades, Baby (Orchestral Version from Abbey Road)" (2021), SO Recordings
- "Voodoo Science" (2023), Liberator Music
- "Run Baby Run" (2023), Liberator Music
