= Loneliest Time of Year =

2019 single by Mabel

- Original cover. The re-release uses the same photo but in greyscale.

Single by Mabel

from the EP Christmas
- Released: 22 November 2019
- Genre: Christmas
- Length: 3:22
- Label: Polydor
- Songwriter(s): Mabel McVey; Uzoechi Emenike; Tre Jean-Marie; Nayla Nyassa; Camille Purcell
- Producer(s): Sillkey; Tre Jean-Marie

Mabel singles chronology
"God Is a Dancer" (2019)	"Loneliest Time of Year" (2019)	"Boyfriend" (2020)

Music video
- "Loneliest Time of Year" on YouTube

"Loneliest Time of Year" is a Christmas song by English singer Mabel, released by Polydor Records on 22 November 2019. It was written by Mabel, MNEK, Tre Jean-Marie, Nayla Nyassa and Camille Purcell, and produced by Sillkey and Tre Jean-Marie.

== Release ==
Mabel first teased "Loneliest Time of Year" on Twitter on 19 November 2019 by posting the lyrics, "Doesn't matter if I manage to get all the things on my list". She shared its accompanying cover art on social media and a short snippet of the song on TikTok the following day. The cover art is a polaroid of the singer wearing a plaid winter coat and Supreme winter hat in front of a snow backdrop. Upon the single's release on 22 November 2019, Mabel wrote, "Important to remember that what can be the best time of year for some can be the loneliest time of year for someone else so be kind and take care of each other this Christmas." One year later, Mabel announced on 18 November 2020 via social media that she was going to re-release the song along with a cover of the song "I'll Be Home for Christmas" on 20 November 2020.

== Critical reception ==
In his review for Idolator, Mike Wass called it a "wonderfully miserable" and "refreshingly realistic Christmas song".

== Track listing ==
- Digital download (2019)
1. "Loneliest Time of Year" – 3:22
- Digital download (2020)
1. "Loneliest Time of Year" – 3:22
2. "I'll Be Home for Christmas" – 3:15

== Personnel ==
- Mabel – vocals
- Sillkey – production, drums, keyboards, piano, bass, synthesizer
- Tre Jean-Marie – production, drums, engineering, guitar, keyboards, strings, synthesizer, programming, background vocals
- MNEK – vocal production
- Matt Zara – guitar
- Phil Tan – mixing
- Stuart Hawkes – mastering

Credits adapted from Qobuz.

== Charts ==
Chart (2019–2020)	Peak position
Belgium (Ultratip Bubbling Under Flanders)	11
Scotland (OCC)	57
Sweden (Sverigetopplistan)	78
