= Boyfriend (Mabel song) =

2020 single by Mabel

Single by Mabel
- Released: 26 February 2020
- Recorded: 2019
- Genre: Pop
- Length: 3:46
- Label: Polydor
- Songwriter(s): Camille Purcell; Mabel McVey; Marlena Shaw; Richard Evans; Robert Miller; Steve Mac
- Producer(s): Steve Mac

Mabel singles chronology
"Loneliest Time of Year" (2019)	"Boyfriend" (2020)	"West Ten" (2020)

Music video
- "Boyfriend" on YouTube

"Boyfriend" is a song by English singer Mabel, released on 26 February 2020. The song appears as a digital reissue bonus track on Mabel's debut studio album High Expectations (2019). "Boyfriend" samples "Remember Me" (1997) by Blue Boy which in turn sampled "Woman of the Ghetto" (1969) by Marlena Shaw.

== Background ==
Mabel announced the song's release on 21 February 2020. She described the song as "wanting someone in your life doesn't mean you can't still be dat bitchh".

== Composition ==
Musically, "Boyfriend" is an empowering upbeat pop anthem with a bumping production. Lyrically, the song has themes of female empowerment where Mabel is wanting a boyfriend, but saying how she doesn't necessarily need one: "I want a boyfriend... Even though a man ain't something I need".

This song is written in the key of B minor and has a tempo of 100 beats per minute.

== Music video ==
The song's accompanying music video was directed by Isaac Rentz and was released on 26 February 2020. According to Mabel the video for "Boyfriend" was inspired by late American singer Aaliyah. It sees Mabel make her ideal boyfriend in an underground computer laboratory. It is a gender-reverse flip of the 1985 film Weird Science.

== Track listing ==
Digital download
No.	Title	Length
1.	"Boyfriend"	3:46

Digital download - Tiësto Remix
No.	Title	Length
1.	"Boyfriend" (Tiësto Remix)	2:57

Digital download - Endor Remix
No.	Title	Length
1.	"Boyfriend" (Endor Remix)	2:51

Digital download - Digital Farm Animals & Franklin Remix
No.	Title	Length
1.	"Boyfriend" (Digital Farm Animals & Franklin Remix)	3:01

Digital download – Remixes EP
No.	Title	Length
1.	"Boyfriend" (Tiësto remix)	2:57
2.	"Boyfriend" (220 Kid remix)	3:14
3.	"Boyfriend" (Endor remix)	2:51
4.	"Boyfriend" (Digital Farm Animals & Franklin remix)	3:01

Digital download – Acoustic version
No.	Title	Length
1.	"Boyfriend" (acoustic)	3:59

== Credits and personnel ==
Credits adapted from Tidal.

- Mabel – songwriting, vocals
- Steve Mac – production, songwriting, keyboards
- Camille Purcell – songwriting, backing vocals
- Marlena Shaw – songwriting
- Richard Evans – songwriting
- Robert Miller – songwriting
- Chris Laws – drum programming, recording, studio personnel
- Bill Zimmerman – engineering, studio personnel
- Phil Tan – mixing, studio personnel
- Dann Pursey – percussion, recording, studio personnel

== Charts ==
=== Weekly charts ===
Chart (2020)	Peak position
Belgium (Ultratip Bubbling Under Flanders)	4
Belgium (Ultratip Bubbling Under Wallonia)	26
Croatia (HRT)	55
Czech Republic (Rádio – Top 100)	37
Euro Digital Song Sales (Billboard)	16
Hungary (Rádiós Top 40)	25
Ireland (IRMA)	9
Mexico Ingles Airplay (Billboard)	27
New Zealand Hot Singles (RMNZ)	38
Romania (Airplay 100)	53
Scotland (OCC)	11
Slovakia (Rádio Top 100)	81
Sweden Heatseeker (Sverigetopplistan)	5
UK Singles (OCC)	10

=== Year-end charts ===
Chart (2020)	Position
Hungary (Rádiós Top 40)	100
UK Singles (OCC)	73

== Certifications ==
Region	Certification	Certified units/sales
Australia (ARIA)	Gold	35,000^{‡}
Brazil (Pro-Música Brasil)	Gold	20,000^{‡}
United Kingdom (BPI)	Platinum	600,000^{‡}
^{‡} Sales+streaming figures based on certification alone.

== Release history ==
Region	Date	Format	Version	Label	Ref.
Various	26 February 2020	Digital download; streaming	Original	Polydor	
United Kingdom	28 February 2020	Contemporary hit radio	Original	Polydor	
Australia	2 March 2020	Contemporary hit radio	Original	Universal	
Italy	6 March 2020	Contemporary hit radio	Original	Universal	
Various	27 March 2020	Digital download; streaming	Tiësto Remix	Polydor	
Various	3 April 2020	Digital download; streaming	Endor Remix	Polydor	
Various	10 April 2020	Digital download; streaming	Digital Farm Animals & Franklin Remix	Polydor	
Various	1 May 2020	Digital download; streaming	Remixes EP	Polydor	
Various	12 June 2020	Digital download; streaming	Acoustic	Polydor	
