= Kojo Funds =

English singer and rapper (born 1995)

- Born: Errol Bellot
- Genres: Afroswing; road rap; hip hop; dancehall; Afro-pop
- Occupations: Singer; rapper; songwriter
- Years active: 2015–present
- Website: earth-agency.com/artists/kojo-funds/

Errol Bellot, known professionally as Kojo Funds (/koʊdʒoʊ fʌndz/ KOH-joh FUNDZ), is an English singer, rapper, and songwriter. His music blends West African and Caribbean sounds with road rap, dancehall, and pop. Kojo Funds featured on Yxng Bane's single "Fine Wine" and on Mabel's "Finders Keepers". His own singles include "Check" with Raye.

== Early life and education ==
Kojo Funds was born Errol Bellot. His mother is Ghanaian, of the Fante tribe, and his father is from the Commonwealth of Dominica, but his father did not provide parenting.

He grew up in Custom House, Newham, in East London. He attended Royal Docks Academy in 2006.

== Career ==
A number of Funds' songs have been produced by GA, including "Dun Talkin". In early 2017, he had a feature on the Yxng Bane single "Fine Wine" which was certified silver by the BPI, and on Mabel's "Finders Keepers" which reached number 8 in the UK Official Charts Company Singles chart. On 9 February 2018 he released the single "Check" with English singer-songwriter Raye.

In 2017 Kojo Funds was nominated for Best Newcomer at the MOBO Awards. In 2018 he appeared at Bestival, and Wireless Festival.

He calls his musical style afroswing. It has also been called "afro-bashment". The genre originated in London in late 2000s; it blends West African and Caribbean sounds with road rap, hip hop, dancehall, and British pop music.

== Personal life ==
He is an avid supporter of Manchester United F.C.

== Discography ==
=== Albums ===
Title	Details	Peak chart positions
Title	Details	UK
Golden Boy	Released: 28 September 2018; Label: Atlantic, F&Y, Warner Music; Format: Streaming, digital download	40

=== Singles ===
==== As lead artist ====
Title	Year	Peak chart positions	Certifications	Album
Title	Year	UK	Certifications	Album
"My 9lne"	2016	—	BPI: Silver	Non-album single
"Dun Talkin'" (featuring Abra Cadabra)	2016	—	BPI: Gold	Golden Boy
"Robbery"	2016	—		Non-album singles
"Arriba!"	2016	—		Non-album singles
"Warning"	2017	—	BPI: Silver	Golden Boy
"Fear No One"	2017	—		Non-album single
"My Wish" (featuring Kranium)	2017	—		Golden Boy
"Check" (featuring Raye)	2018	26	BPI: Platinum	Golden Boy
"Stallin'"	2018	—		Golden Boy
"Who Am I?" (featuring Bugzy Malone)	2018	69		Golden Boy
"Take Off" (with Stefflon Don)	2019	—		Non-album singles
"I Like" (featuring Wizkid)	2019	74	BPI: Silver	Non-album singles
"Vanessa"	2020	—		Non-album singles
"Duppy"	2020	—		Non-album singles
"Gimme a Time" (with Don EE)	2021	—		Non-album singles
"Chit Chat" (with Tranell)	2021	—		Non-album singles
"Let Me Know"	2021	—		Non-album singles
"So Nice"	2021	—		Non-album singles
"Do You Mind"	2022	—		Non-album singles
"—" denotes a recording that did not chart or was not released in that territory.

==== As featured artist ====
List of singles as featured artist, with selected chart positions and certifications, showing year released and album name
Title	Year	Peak chart positions					Certifications	Album
Title	Year	UK	UK R&B	IRE	SCO	FRA	Certifications	Album
"Fantasy" (Jamila Jones featuring Kojo Funds)	2016	—	—	—	—	—		Non-album single
"Loco (Remix)" (86 featuring Chieffy and Kojo Funds)	2017	—	—	—	—	—		86 Bangerz
"I'll Be Waiting" (Redlight featuring Liv Dawson and Kojo Funds)	2017	—	—	—	—	—		Non-album singles
"Bad" (Juls featuring Not3s, Kojo Funds and Eugy)	2017	—	—	—	—	—		Non-album singles
"Fine Wine" (Yxng Bane featuring Kojo Funds)	2017	—	—	—	—	—	BPI: Platinum	Non-album singles
"Finders Keepers" (Mabel featuring Kojo Funds)	2017	8	2	45	29	—	BPI: 2× Platinum	High Expectations
"Whistle" (Wretch 32 featuring Donae'o and Kojo Funds)	2017	—	—	—	—	—		FR32
"Calling" (GRM Daily featuring Chip and Kojo Funds)	2017	—	—	—	—	—		Non-album single
"Creepin Up (The Come Up)" (Remedee featuring Yxng Bane, Masicka and Kojo Funds)	2018	—	—	—	—	—		Golden Boy
"Tout Va Bien (Remix)" (Orelsan featuring Eugy and Kojo Funds)	2018	—	—	—	—	53		La fête est finie
"Crew" (Raye featuring Kojo Funds and Ray Blk)	2018	—	—	—	—	—		Side Tape
"Traffic Jam" (Banx & Ranx featuring Kojo Funds)	2019	—	—	—	—	—		Non-album single
"Pan-Fried" (Kano featuring Kojo Funds)	2019	70	—	—	—	—		Hoodies All Summer
"—" denotes items which were not released in that country or failed to chart.
