= Let Them Know =

Single by Mabel

from the album About Last Night...
- Released: 18 June 2021
- Genre: Dance-pop; disco; synth-pop
- Length: 2:28
- Label: Polydor
- Songwriters: Mabel McVey; Rachel Keen; Samuel George Lewis; Uzoechi Emenike
- Producers: SG Lewis; Raye

Mabel singles chronology
"Tick Tock" (2020)	"Let Them Know" (2021)	"Take It Home" (2021)

Music video
- "Let Them Know" on YouTube

"Let Them Know" is a song by English singer Mabel. It was released by Polydor Records on 18 June 2021 as the lead single from her second studio album About Last Night... (2022). The song was written by Mabel, Raye, MNEK, and its producer SG Lewis. It was a top 40 hit in Mabel's home country of the United Kingdom as well as five additional European countries.

== Music and lyrics ==
"Let Them Know" is an uptempo, dance-pop, synth-pop and 1980s-style disco song with dancehall undertones. It is 2 minutes and 28 seconds long, and has a 1990s house rhythm reminiscent of RuPaul's 1992 song "Supermodel (You Better Work)".

Inspired by obsessively watching 1990 film Paris Is Burning, and American television series Pose and RuPaul's Drag Race, Mabel wrote the track as a reflection on dance music's generational themes of expression, liberation and inclusion. According to the singer, "Let Them Know" is "dedicated to anyone who's ever felt scared to truly be themselves." The lyrics include a reference to Doja Cat and her 2020 song "Say So".

== Release ==
Mabel first teased the single's release on 9 June 2021 with a 30-second teaser trailer titled "Allow Me to Reintroduce Myself". The clip shows the singer performing and filming a music video, and ends with a preview of "Let Them Know". On 10 June, she shared the release date, cover art and a link to pre-save the single on streaming services. The official TikTok audio was released on 12 June. Within a week, more than 52,000 videos were uploaded under the audio by users of the social networking service.

"Let Them Know" was released by Polydor Records on 18 June. It was promoted with its own lens filter on Instagram and Snapchat, and added it to rotation by British radio stations BBC Radio 1 and Capital FM the same day. A remix by English DJ Riton was released on 9 July.

== Critical response ==
In his review for The Sunday Times, Dan Cairns likened the track to music by the Spice Girls, describing it as "sassy, savvy, precision-tooled pop perfection". Isaac Chiew of NME regarded the "bombastic floor-filler" as a welcome comeback from Mabel, complimenting its disco production and "anthemic" chorus. Clash reviewer Robin Murray called it "an unashamed addition to the pop banger canon." The Guardian's Luke Holland viewed the song as "wholly edgeless yet undeniably enjoyable glitter-pop" and "daft fun in all the ways pop should be".

== Commercial performance ==
"Let Them Know" debuted at number 38 on the UK Singles Chart with first-week sales of 10,368 units. It has since ascended to a new peak of number 19 on the chart dated August 26, 2021. In Ireland, the song entered the Irish Singles Chart at number 48; it has peaked at number 19.

== Music video ==
The music video for "Let Them Know" was directed by Isaac Rentz. A 25-second teaser trailer was shared on Mabel's YouTube channel on 16 June 2021. The music video live premiered on YouTube at 8 a.m. BST on 18 June, preceded by a live chat with the singer. A behind the scenes segment was released by MTV UK on 28 June.

== Track listing ==
- Digital download and streaming
1. "Let Them Know" – 2:28
- Digital download and streaming – Riton remix
1. "Let Them Know" (Riton Remix) – 3:00

== Personnel ==
Credits adapted from Qobuz.

- Mabel – vocals, background vocals
- SG Lewis – producer, drums, engineer, keyboards, bass, synthesizer, programming
- Raye – co-producer, vocal producer
- Cameron Gower Poole – vocal producer
- Josh Gudwin – mixing
- Heidi Wang – mixing assistance
- Stuart Hawkes – mastering

== Charts ==
Chart performance for "Let Them Know"
Chart (2021)	Peak position
Croatia International Airplay (HRT)	21
Hungary (Rádiós Top 40)	4
Hungary (Single Top 40)	28
Ireland (IRMA)	19
Netherlands (Dutch Top 40 Tipparade)	1
Netherlands (Single Tip)	11
Poland (Polish Airplay Top 100)	46
Sweden Heatseeker (Sverigetopplistan)	12
UK Singles (OCC)	19

== Certifications ==
Certifications for "Let Them Know"
Region	Certification	Certified units/sales
United Kingdom (BPI)	Gold	400,000^{‡}
^{‡} Sales+streaming figures based on certification alone.

== Release history ==
Release dates and formats for "Let Them Know"
Region	Date	Format(s)	Version	Label(s)	Ref.
Various	18 June 2021	Digital download; streaming	Original	Polydor	
Italy	18 June 2021	Contemporary hit radio	Original	Universal	
Russia	27 June 2021	Contemporary hit radio	Original	Universal	
Various	9 July 2021	Digital download; streaming	Riton Remix	Polydor	
