= Ring Ring (Jax Jones song) =

2018 single by Jax Jones featuring Mabel and Rich the Kid

Single by Jax Jones featuring Mabel and Rich the Kid

from the EP Snacks
- Released: 22 June 2018
- Genre: Tropical pop
- Length: 3:37
- Label: Polydor
- Songwriters: Timucin Aluo; Marlon Roudette; Mark Ralph; Uzoechi Emenike; Mabel McVey; Camille Purcell
- Producers: Jax Jones; Mark Ralph

Jax Jones singles chronology
"Breathe" (2018)	"Ring Ring" (2018)	"Play" (2018)

Mabel singles chronology
"Cigarette" (2018)	"Ring Ring" (2018)	"One Shot" (2018)

Rich the Kid singles chronology
"Talk to Me" (2018)	"Ring Ring" (2018)	"Mo Paper" (2018)

Music video
- "Ring Ring" on YouTube

"Ring Ring" is a song by English DJ Jax Jones featuring English singer Mabel and American rapper Rich the Kid. It was released as a single on 22 June 2018 as the fifth single from Jones' EP, Snacks. It reached number 12 on the UK Singles Chart and was certified Silver by the British Phonographic Industry in August 2018. It is included as a bonus track on the reissue of Mabel's mixtape, Ivy to Roses (2017), and on her debut studio album, High Expectations (2019).

== Critical reception ==
Kat Bein of Billboard called the track a "summer song with dance-pop appeal and island rhythm", and said the track has "a certain richness to it, a sensual depth to counterbalance the catchy pop hook, a definite groove to get things heated as the sun goes down".

== Music video ==
The music video opens with a mock commercial for the late-night hotline "0-800-RING-RING", and features Mabel as a worker at a call centre, as well as shots of Jax Jones and Mabel dancing in hallways with light displays behind them; Rich the Kid does not appear. Billboard compared its "vibes" to those of late 1990s and 2000s videos, calling it a "throwback", and acclaimed Jax Jones' and Mabel's outfits.

== Charts ==
Chart (2018)	Peak position
Belgium (Ultratip Bubbling Under Flanders)	14
Belgium (Ultratop 50 Wallonia)	36
Bulgaria (PROPHON)	1
Euro Digital Song Sales (Billboard)	17
Greece (IFPI)	20
Ireland (IRMA)	15
Poland Dance (ZPAV)	39
Romania (Airplay 100)	9
Scotland Singles (OCC)	9
Sweden Heatseeker (Sverigetopplistan)	10
UK Singles (OCC)	12
UK Dance (OCC)	2
US Hot Dance/Electronic Songs (Billboard)	33

== Certifications ==
Region	Certification	Certified units/sales
United Kingdom (BPI)	Platinum	600,000^{‡}
^{‡} Sales+streaming figures based on certification alone.
