= Not3s =

British rapper and singer

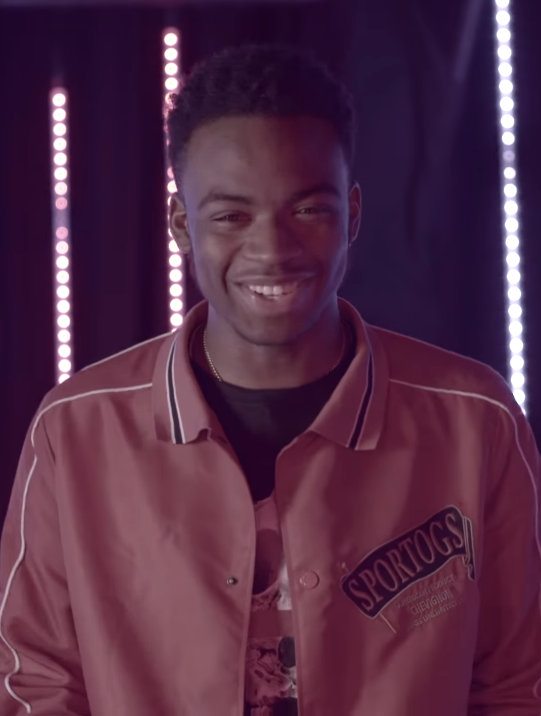
- Not3s in 2018

Background information
- Also known as: Notes
- Born: Lukman Olanrewaju Odunaike; 17 April 1998 (age 28); Hackney, London, England
- Genres: British hip hop; afroswing; R&B; Afrobeats
- Years active: 2016–present
- Labels: Moves; Columbia; Relentless
- Website: www.not3s.com

Lukman Olanrewaju Odunaike (born 17 April 1998), known professionally as Not3s (pronounced "notes"), is an English rapper and singer from Hackney, London. His songs include "My Lover" and "Fine Line", both of which are collaborations with Mabel.

His breakthrough song, "Addison Lee", has been described as a viral hit, achieving 17 million views on GRM Daily and has achieved much publicity for the singer. The song, which takes its name from the London-based ride sharing firm, achieved such popularity that Not3s was invited to the firm's Christmas party in KOKO to perform the song.

He was nominated for the BBC Sound of 2018.

== Personal life ==
Odunaike was born and grew up in Hackney, London to Nigerian parents. He is a supporter of Manchester United F.C.

== Discography ==
=== Studio albums ===
Title	Details
3 Th3 Album	Released: 27 August 2021; Label: Sony UK; Format: Streaming, digital download

=== Mixtapes ===
Title	Details	Peak chart positions	Certifications
Title	Details	UK	Certifications
Take Not3s	Release: 17 November 2017; Label: Relentless; Format: Streaming, digital download	43	BPI: Silver
Take Not3s II	Release: 13 July 2018; Label: Relentless; Format: Streaming, digital download	16	

=== Extended plays ===
Title	Details
3 Roses	Released: 14 February 2022; Label: Independent; Format: Streaming, digital download
Son of the Soil	Released: 27 September 2023; Label: Independent; Format: Streaming, digital download

=== Singles ===
==== As lead artist ====
Title	Year	Peak chart positions		Certifications	Album
Title	Year	UK	UK R&B	Certifications	Album
"Naughty" (with 23 Unofficial)	2017	—	—		Non-album single
"Addison Lee (Peng Ting Called Madison)"	2017	57	15	BPI: Platinum	Take Not3s
"Celebration" (with Mostack)	2017	—	—		Non-album single
"Aladdin"	2017	61	15	BPI: Platinum	Take Not3s
"My Lover"	2017	14	4	BPI: 2× Platinum	Take Not3s
"99 + 1" (with Mostack)	2017	82	—		Take Not3s
"Hooper" (with Knucks)	2018	—	—		Non-album single
"Sit Back Down" (featuring Maleek Berry)	2018	61	—	BPI: Gold	Take Not3s II
"M3 Not You"	2018	—	—		Take Not3s II
"Just Fine"	2018	60	—		Take Not3s II
"Palm Wine"	2018	—	—		Take Not3s II
"To the Max" (with Nana Rogues & Wizkid)	2018	—	—		Non-album singles
"Wanting"	2019	42	15	BPI: Silver	Non-album singles
"Nasti Riddim" (with Tiggs Da Author)	2019	—	—		Non-album singles
"Princ3"	2019	—	—		Non-album singles
"Highest"	2020	—	—		Non-album singles
"One More Time" (featuring AJ Tracey)	2020	65	—		3 Th3 Album
"Boom Bam" (featuring Young T & Bugsey)	2021	—	—		3 Th3 Album
"Blow It All" (with LONDAM & Chivv)	2021	—	—		Non-album singles
"Foreign" (with Bankulli)	2021	—	—		Non-album singles
"On It" (with Crumz & S1mba featuring PnB Rock & K1NG)	2021	—	—		Non-album singles
"Who Changed?"	2022	—	—		Non-album singles
"So Far Gone" (featuring Mayorkun)	2023	—	—		Non-album singles
"Start Me Up"	2023	—	—		Non-album singles
"I Wanna" (with Tobi)	2023	—	—		Non-album singles
"—" denotes items which were not released in that country or failed to chart.

==== As featured artist ====
Title	Year	Peak chart positions		Certifications	Album
Title	Year	UK	UK R&B	Certifications	Album
"Bad" (Juls featuring Not3s, Kojo Funds & Eugy)	2017	—	—		Non-album singles
"Bad" (Steel Banglez featuring Yungen, MoStack, Mr Eazi & Not3s)	2017	29	19	BPI: Platinum	Non-album singles
"Nah" (Sneakbo featuring Not3s)	2017	—	—		Non-album singles
"YRF" (GRM Daily featuring Fredo & Not3s)	2017	—	—		Let's Work (Vol. 1)
"Fine Line" (Mabel featuring Not3s)	2018	11	4	BPI: Platinum	Ivy to Roses
"Pushing Up" (NSG featuring Not3s)	2018	—	—		Non-album singles
"Force You" (Bobii Lewis featuring Not3s)	2018	—	—		Non-album singles
"Sober" (Dakota featuring Not3s)	2018	—	—		Non-album singles
"Butterflies" (AJ Tracey and Not3s)	2018	19	7	BPI: 2× Platinum	AJ Tracey
"Boasy" (Avelino featuring Not3s)	2018	85	—	BPI: Silver	Non-album single
"CRB Check" (Chip featuring Not3s)	2018	43	28	BPI: Silver	Ten10
"Issa Mood" (Headie One featuring Not3s)	2018	—	—		Non-album singles
"Will Smith" (Geko featuring Not3s)	2018	100	—		Non-album singles
"Living Gravy" (Young T & Bugsey featuring Not3s)	2018	—	—		Non-album singles
"Love of My Life" (Remedee featuring Not3s & Young Adz)	2019	37	22	BPI: Silver	TBA
"Floss" (AJ Tracey featuring MoStack & Not3s)	2019	22	16	BPI: Silver	AJ Tracey
"Cash Train" (GRM Daily featuring Not3s and Blade Brown)	2019	62	35		GRM 10
"Top Winners" (Tinie featuring Not3s)	2020	64	—		TBA
"—" denotes items which were not released in that country or failed to chart.

=== Other charted songs ===
Title	Year	Peak chart positions	Album
Title	Year	UK	Album
"Haters" (Fredo featuring Not3s)	2018	90	Tables Turn

=== Guest appearances ===
Song	Year	Other artist(s)	Album
"No Don" (Remix)	2017	Lotto Boyzz, Chip	Non-album remixes
"Trophy" (Remix)	2017	D-Block Europe, Young Adz	Non-album remixes
"No Good For Me" (iLL BLU Remix)	2017	ADP, Jeremih, Yungen	Non-album remixes
"Haters"	2018	Fredo	Tables Turn
"Heart"	2018	Bugzy Malone	B. Inspired
"So Sweet"	2019	Kali Claire	Symptoms of a Teen – EP

== Filmography ==
=== Television ===
Year	Title	Role	Notes	Ref.
2018	Team Harvey	Himself	1 Episode	
2018	Don't Hate The Playaz	Himself	Series 1; Episode 6	
2018	The Big Narstie Show	Himself	Series 1; Episode 3	

=== Web ===
Year	Title	Role	Notes	Ref.
2018	Shiro's Story	Jermaine	Part 3 (Short YouTube Series); Cameo	
