= Mabel (singer) =

Swedish-British singer (born 1996)

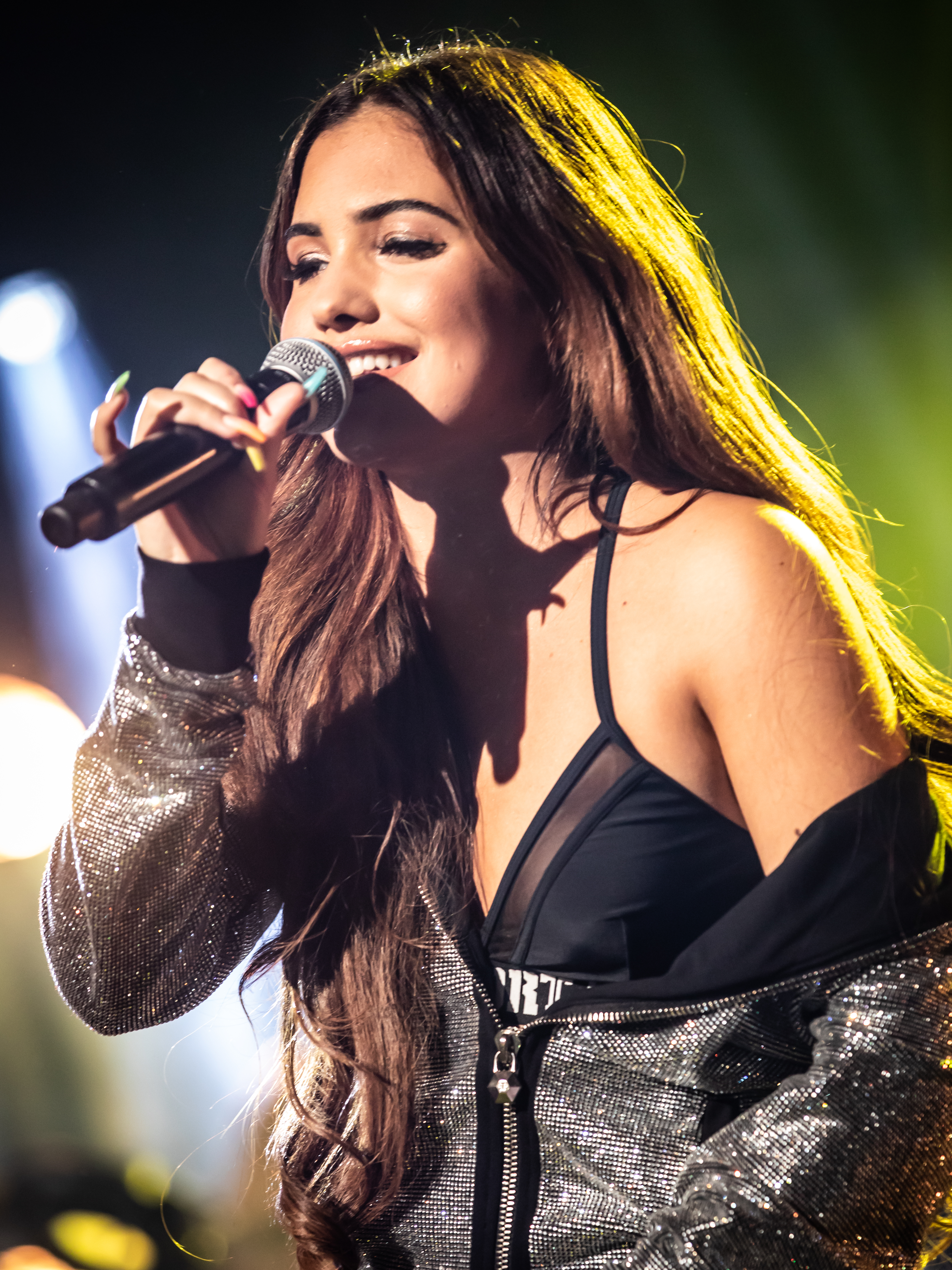
- Mabel performing in 2018
- Born: Mabel Alabama-Pearl McVey; 19 February 1996 (age 30); Alhaurín el Grande, Málaga, Spain
- Occupations: Singer; songwriter
- Years active: 2015–present
- Spouse: Preye Crooks (m. 2025)
- Children: 1
- Parents: Cameron McVey (father); Neneh Cherry (mother)
- Relatives: Marlon Roudette (half-brother); Eagle-Eye Cherry (uncle); Titiyo (aunt); Moki Cherry (grandmother); Don Cherry (step-grandfather)
- Musical career
- Origin: Notting Hill, London, England
- Genres: R&B; pop
- Instrument: Vocals
- Labels: Polydor; Capitol
- Website: www.mabelofficial.com

Mabel Alabama-Pearl McVey (born 19 February 1996) is a British-Swedish singer. She rose to prominence in 2017 with her single "Finders Keepers" which peaked at number eight on the UK Singles Chart.

Her debut studio album High Expectations was released in 2019 and entered the UK Albums Chart at number three, being certified platinum. The album included the top ten singles "Don't Call Me Up", "Mad Love" and "Boyfriend", with "Don't Call Me Up" also charting on the US Billboard Hot 100. She won the Brit Award for British Female Solo Artist in 2020.

Her second studio album About Last Night... was released in 2022. It was supported by the release of its lead single "Let Them Know". The album peaked at number two on the UK Albums Chart and became her highest-charting album on the chart.

== Early life ==
Mabel Alabama-Pearl McVey was born on 19 February 1996 in Alhaurín el Grande, Málaga, Spain. She is the youngest child of English music producer Cameron McVey and Swedish-Sierra Leonean singer Neneh Cherry. Through her mother, Mabel is the step-granddaughter of the American jazz musician Don Cherry, granddaughter of Swedish-Sierra Leonean highlife and afrobeat musician Ahmadu Jah and the niece of Swedish singers Eagle-Eye Cherry and Titiyo. Her sister Tyson, half-sister Naima and half-brother Marlon Roudette are also singers. The family lived in Alhaurín el Grande for two years prior to Mabel's birth before relocating back to Notting Hill, West London, England when she was two years old.

At age four, she taught herself to read through phonetics and audiobooks, but soon developed anxiety from being sensitive to her surroundings and being bullied due to racial backgrounds. Her parents—who were against the use of medication—encouraged Mabel to express herself through music and a journal. The following year, she learned piano and wrote her first song.

To help manage her anxiety, the family moved to Sweden when she was eight and lived in her mother's native countryside home near the town of Hässleholm in southern Sweden, and later moved to Stockholm in October 2004. First, she attended an international school, but later transferred to Kulturama, a school with aesthetic training and courses including musical, music and song as well as visual arts and design.At age 15, Mabel enrolled at the Stockholm music school Rytmus Musikergymnasiet (a music high school) where she took a three-year course in songwriting, production and music theory. She commented on her time at the school on Swedish radio: "I was drawn to RnB and wanted to write songs on piano, but the most popular students wrote indie songs on guitar." While in high school, she had a popular Swedish style blog, chronicling her girl-gang's style. It was so successful that it landed her in the front row of international runway shows with her mother Neneh Cherry, including the likes of Stella McCartney and the Paris Fashion Week. Mabel's stylist is her Swedish high school friend, Simone Beyene.

== Career ==
=== 2015–2018: Bedroom and Ivy to Roses ===
Mabel told Swedish morning show Nyhetsmorgon that she moved to London as soon as she graduated Rytmus musikgymnasium in Stockholm because she found the London R&B scene appetizing.

Mabel released her debut single "Know Me Better" in July 2015, which caught the attention of BBC Radio 1 DJ Annie Mac, who made the song her Tune of the Week. Within weeks, Mabel signed a recording contract with Universal.

Just after leaving Stockholm for London, The Guardian's Tshepo Mokoena spotlighted Mabel as one of Sweden's rising stars in a profile of three new Swedish R&B singers:

Better Swede symphony: how a new generation is redefining Scandipop. In a genre once typified by blonde singers and ice-cool beats, artists like Mabel, Zhala and Seinabo Sey are multi-racial and multi-genre, yet create music indebted to Sweden's pop heritage

In March 2017, after the releases of the 2015 and 2016 singles "My Boy My Town" and "Thinking Of You", she released "Finders Keepers" featuring British rapper Kojo Funds, which reached the Top 10 of the UK Singles Chart in late 2017. In May 2017, she released her debut extended play Bedroom.

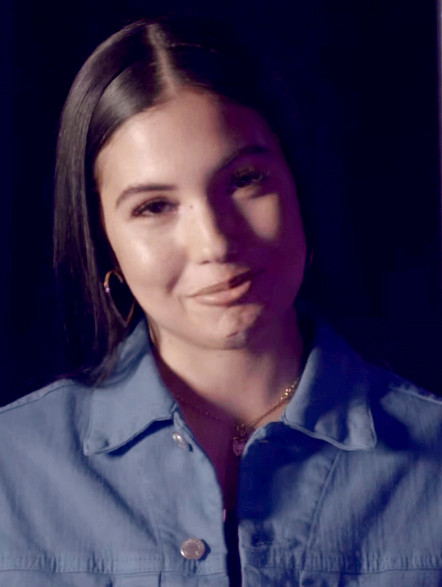
Mabel in an interview in 2018

In October 2017, Mabel released "Begging", the lead single from her debut mixtape Ivy to Roses, which was released shortly after. In December, she collaborated with Not3s on "My Lover". Following the January 2018 release of a second Not3s collaboration, "Fine Line", Mabel opened for English singer Harry Styles during the European part of the second leg of a tour in the support of his debut studio album. After her tour with Styles, she embarked on her own headline tour through the United Kingdom and Europe. In June, she was featured on "Ring Ring" alongside American rapper Rich the Kid and British DJ Jax Jones. Later that year, after releasing "One Shot", she co-wrote "Blind", a song for British girl group Four of Diamonds.

=== 2019–2020: High Expectations ===
In January 2019, Mabel was nominated for British Breakthrough Act at the 2019 Brit Awards. She re-released Ivy to Roses with a new cover art and the inclusion of all the singles that had been released since the first edition's release. With this, Mabel also released "Don't Call Me Up", which debuted at number 11 on the UK Singles Chart. The song peaked at number 3, becoming her highest-charting single to date. On 7 June 2019, she released "Mad Love", the second single from her debut studio album, High Expectations, which was released on 2 August that year. The song debuted at number 18 in the UK, later peaking at number 8.

"Don't Call Me Up" was nominated for the "Song of The Year" award at the Swedish Radio P3's 2020 P3 Guld Awards

Following the November 2019 release of her Christmas single Loneliest Time Of Year, in December 2019, Mabel performed at the Jingle Bell Ball, alongside other artists such as Ava Max, Rita Ora, Regard and The Script.

From January to March 2020, Mabel embarked on the High Expectations Tour across North America, the United Kingdom and Europe.

In February 2020, she released the song "Boyfriend". She then featured in a BBC Radio 1 Live Lounge cover of the Foo Fighters song "Times Like These" as part of the Live Lounge Allstars. This was organised in response to the ongoing COVID-19 pandemic. Later that year, in July, Mabel collaborated with AJ Tracey on "West Ten" and released an acoustic version of High Expectations. The following month, Clean Bandit released "Tick Tock" featuring Mabel and 24kGoldn.

=== 2021–2022: About Last Night... ===
Following a teaser titled 'Allow me to reintroduce myself', posted to her social media in June 2021, "Let Them Know" was released on 18 June 2021. On 16 July 2021, Mabel released the song "Take It Home" as part of Pokémon's 25th anniversary album. In August 2021, she performed on the ITV2 reality series Love Island. On 29 October 2021, Mabel and Joel Corry released the song "I Wish". The song was followed by a cover of the Cyndi Lauper song "Time After Time", which she recorded for the 2021 McDonald's Christmas television advertisements. The second single, "Good Luck", featuring Jax Jones and Swedish EDM duo Galantis was released on 18 March 2022. Mabel's second album is called About Last Night...

In November 2021, Mabel performed at Hits Live in Liverpool, alongside other artists such as Mimi Webb, The Script, Becky Hill, Joel Corry, Tom Grennan, Ella Henderson and Ed Sheeran.

About Last Night peaked at number 2 on the UK Albums Chart, Mabel's highest-charting album to date, it also peaked at number 4 on the Scottish Albums Chart, once again her highest to date.

=== 2023–present: Sommar and self-titled mixtape Mabel ===
On 8 June 2023, Sveriges Radio announced Mabel would be one of the hosts of the 2023 season of Swedish radio show Sommar. While hosting the show, Mabel said she had been writing new songs with her brother Marlon, and with support from her parents and her boyfriend Preye Crooks. She stated that in the past she was reluctant to include her family, but that has now changed. She added that this material is different from her previous work, and adds that she knows this is a cliché. "This is a new chapter in my life. I have once again changed the team I work with. And for the first time, I have decided to let my family in. I need them. They are my anchor that keeps me grounded, but they are also my compass that guides me back to my true self. As soon as I feel lost or inadequate". In October 2024, Mabel stated in Swedish Elle that she has been working in Max Martin's studio with her brother.

On 19 January 2024, a remix of "Finders Keepers" by South African DJ and music producer Jaydon Lewis was released on streaming platforms. On 9 February, Mabel was featured in Ghanaian rapper Black Sherif's song "Zero". On 20 March, Mabel posted a statement on Instagram saying that she will be releasing new music after being in an 18-month hiatus. On 25 April, she released "Vitamins" as a standalone single. On 10 May, she released "Look at My Body, Pt. II" featuring British musician Shygirl as the lead single from her upcoming third studio album. On 17 May, Mabel received a Brits Billion Award. On 25 May, she performed at BBC Radio 1's Big Weekend. On 19 July, she released "Female Intuition" as the second single from her upcoming third studio album. On 30 August, McVey released her third single, “Chat” from her third upcoming studio album. On 11 October, McVey released her fourth single, “Stupid Dumb” featuring Ty Dolla $ign. On 24 January 2025, Mabel released her fifth single from her upcoming album "All Over You" featuring Ghanaian rapper King Promise. After releasing the singles "Benz" and "January 19", on 29 May 2025 she announced her second mixtape "Mabel" to be released on 25 July 2025, containing the two aforementioned singles. On 3 July McVey announced via her social media that she’s going on tour across Europe in November to promote her upcoming mixtape. On 25 July, Mabel released her second mixtape.

== Personal life ==
Mabel started dating Preye Crooks, who runs the Strawberries & Creem Festival and is son of ex-footballer and BBC pundit Garth Crooks in November 2021. At the end of 2024, they got engaged. The pair got married on 26 July 2025. On 27 September 2026, she announced that she and Crooks welcomed a baby.

Mabel is an avid supporter of Arsenal.

== Discography ==
- High Expectations (2019)
- About Last Night... (2022)

== Concert tours ==
=== Headlining ===
- These Are the Best Times Tour (2018)
- High Expectations Tour (2019–2020)
- Right on Time Tour (2025)

=== Promotional ===
- The Mad Love Tour (2019)
- Intimate Shows (2022)

=== Supporting ===
- Harry Styles: Live on Tour (2018)
- LANY: Thrilla in Manila Tour (2019)
- Khalid: Free Spirit World Tour (2019)

== Awards and nominations ==
Award	Year	Nominated work	Category	Result	Ref.
BBC Radio 1's Teen Awards	2019	Herself	Best British Singer	Nominated	
Brit Awards	2019	Herself	British Breakthrough Act	Nominated	
Brit Awards	2020	Herself	British Female Solo Artist	Won	
Brit Awards	2020	Herself	Best New Artist	Nominated	
Brit Awards	2020	"Don't Call Me Up"	Song of the Year	Nominated	
Brit Awards	2026	Herself	Best R&B Act	Pending	
British Phonographic Industry	2024	Herself	Brits Billion Award	Won	
Clubbing TV Awards	2020	"Don't Call Me Up"	Best Hits Music Video	Nominated	
Clubbing TV Awards	2025	"Look at My Body Pt. II" (with Shygirl)	Best Hits Music Video	Nominated	
Global Awards	2018	Herself	Rising Star	Won	
Global Awards	2018	Herself	Best RnB, Hip Hop or Grime	Nominated	
Grammis	2018	Herself	Best Newcomer	Nominated	
Grammis	2025	Herself	Soul/RnB Artist	Pending	
LOS40 Music Awards	2019	Herself	Best International New Artist	Won	
LOS40 Music Awards	2019	"Don't Call Me Up"	Best International Video	Nominated	
MOBO Awards	2017	Herself	Best Female	Nominated	
MOBO Awards	2017	Herself	Best Newcomer	Nominated	
MTV Brand New	2018	Herself	Special Award	Won	
MTV Europe Music Awards	2019	Herself	Best Push Act	Nominated	
MTV Europe Music Awards	2019	Herself	Best New Act	Nominated	
MTV Europe Music Awards	2019	Herself	Best UK & Ireland Act	Nominated	
MTV Hottest	2021	Herself	Hottest Superstar	Nominated	
MTV Video Play Awards	2019	"Don't Call Me Up"	Winning Video	Won	
Music Week Awards	2021	Mabel x Kangol & H&M	Music & Brand Partnership	Pending	
Musikförläggarnas Pris	2019	"Don't Call Me Up"	Best Song	Nominated	
Musikförläggarnas Pris	2019	Herself	Best Composer	Nominated	
Musikförläggarnas Pris	2019	Herself	Best International Success	Nominated	
NRJ Music Awards	2019	Herself	International Breakthrough of the Year	Nominated	
P3 Gold Awards	2020	"Don't Call Me Up"	Song of the Year	Nominated	
Pop Awards	2023	Herself	Female Artist of the Year	Nominated	
Silver Clef Award	2019	Herself	Best Newcomer	Won	
UK Music Video Awards	2021	"Let Them Know"	Best Pop Video - UK	Nominated	
UK Music Video Awards	2024	"Look at My Body Pt. II" (with Shygirl)	Best R&B/Soul Video - UK	Nominated	
Urban Music Awards	2018	Herself	Best Female Act	Nominated	
Urban Music Awards	2018	"My Lover" (with Not3s)	Best Music Video	Nominated	
Urban Music Awards	2020	Herself	Best Female Act	Nominated	
Urban Music Awards	2020	Herself	Artist of the Year (UK)	Nominated	
Urban Music Awards	2020	"Don't Call Me Up"	Best Music Video	Won	
