= Fine Line (Mabel song) =

2018 single by Mabel featuring Not3s

Single by Mabel featuring Not3s
- Released: 18 January 2018
- Genre: R&B
- Length: 3:31
- Label: Polydor
- Songwriter(s): Mabel McVey; Jordan D. Reid; Marlon McVey-Roudette; Odunaike "Not3s" Lukman
- Producer(s): JD. Reid

Mabel singles chronology
"My Lover" (2017)	"Fine Line" (2018)	"Cigarette" (2018)

Not3s singles chronology
"Sit Back Down" (2018)	"Fine Line" (2018)	"M3 Not You" (2018)

"Fine Line" is a song by English singer Mabel featuring rapper Not3s. The song peaked at number 11 on the UK Singles Chart, becoming her second UK hit after "Finders Keepers". It is included as a bonus track on the reissue of Mabel's mixtape Ivy to Roses, and on her debut studio album High Expectations.

== Track listing ==
- Digital download
1. "Fine Line" (featuring Not3s) – 3:31
- Digital download
1. "Fine Line" (Remix) (featuring Tory Lanez) – 3:31
- Digital download
1. "Fine Line" (Remix) (Mabel and WSTRN) – 3:39
- Digital download
1. "Fine Line" (James Hype Remix) – 3:24
- Digital download
1. "Fine Line" (Snakehips Remix) – 3:33

== Credits and personnel ==
- Mabel McVey – vocals, composition
- JD. Reid – composition
- Marlon Roudette – composition
- Errol Bellot – composition
- Steven Marsden – composition
- Not3s – vocals

== Charts ==
=== Weekly charts ===
Chart (2018)	Peak position
Ireland (IRMA)	38
UK Singles (OCC)	11

=== Year-end charts ===
Chart (2018)	Position
UK Singles (OCC)	70

== Certifications ==
Region	Certification	Certified units/sales
United Kingdom (BPI)	Platinum	600,000^{‡}
^{‡} Sales+streaming figures based on certification alone.
