= Finders Keepers (Mabel song) =

2017 single by Mabel featuring Kojo Funds

Single by Mabel featuring Kojo Funds

from the EP Bedroom
- Released: 26 May 2017
- Genre: R&B; afroswing
- Length: 4:31
- Label: Polydor
- Songwriter(s): Mabel McVey; Jordan D. Reid; Marlon Roudette; Errol Bellot; Steven Marsden

Mabel singles chronology
"Thinking of You" (2016)	"Finders Keepers" (2017)	"Bedroom" (2017)

"Finders Keepers" is a song by English singer Mabel featuring Kojo Funds. It was released on 26 May 2017 as the lead single from Mabel's first EP Bedroom. It was also included on her first mixtape Ivy to Roses (2017) and on her first full-length album High Expectations (2019) as a bonus track. The song peaked at number eight on the UK Singles Chart.

== Music video ==
The music video was recorded in Lisbon and uploaded to Mabel's Vevo page on YouTube on 17 August 2017. The video features Mabel and Kojo Funds dancing and performing the song with close up shots of the singers, couples kissing and a group dancing at night.

== Track listing ==
- Digital download – Remixes
1. "Finders Keepers" (Dusk Remix) – 3:32
2. "Finders Keepers" (Melé Remix) – 4:02

== Credits and personnel ==
Credits adapted from AllMusic.

- Mabel McVey – vocals, composition
- JD. Reid – composition
- Marlon Roudette – composition
- Errol Bellot – composition
- Steven Marsden – composition
- Kojo Funds – vocals

== Charts ==
=== Weekly charts ===
Chart (2017)	Peak position
Euro Digital Song Sales (Billboard)	17
Ireland (IRMA)	52
Scotland (OCC)	29
UK Singles (OCC)	8
UK R&B (Official Charts Company)	2

=== Year-end charts ===
Chart (2017)	Position
UK Singles (Official Charts Company)	76

== Certifications ==
Region	Certification	Certified units/sales
United Kingdom (BPI)	2× Platinum	1,200,000^{‡}
^{‡} Sales+streaming figures based on certification alone.
