= Piranha 3D (soundtrack) =

2010 soundtrack albums

Piranha 3D (Original Motion Picture Soundtrack)

Soundtrack album by Various artists
- Released: August 10, 2010
- Length: 42:47
- Label: Lakeshore
- Producer: Skip Williamson (exec.); Brian McNelis (exec.)

Piranha 3D (Original Motion Picture Soundtrack) is the soundtrack album to the 2010 film Piranha 3D directed by Alexandre Aja. The album was released through Lakeshore Records on August 10, 2010, which included a compilation of rap, dance, hip-hop and R&B music. Featuring artists include Shwayze, Envy, Flatheads, Amanda Blank, Public Enemy, Dub Pistols and Hadouken!.

== Track listing ==
No.	Title	Writer(s)	Artist	Length
1.	"Get U Home"	Cisco Adler and Aaron Smith	Shwayze	3:14
2.	"Shake Shake"	Emmanuel Duncan and Leviticus	Envy feat. Leviticus	3:25
3.	"Here She Comes"	Geoff Siegel and Nik Frost	Flatheads	3:34
4.	"Make It Take It"	Amanda McGrath, Alex Epton, Mario Andreoni, Santi White and Tyler Pope	Amanda Blank	2:27
5.	"Bring the Noise (Remix Pump-kin Edit)"	Carlten Ridenhour, Eric Sadler and Hank Shocklee	Public Enemy vs. Benny Benassi	3:39
6.	"She Moves"	Jason O'Bryan, Barry Ashworth and Ter K. Lawrence	Dub Pistols	3:12
7.	"Flower Duet from Lakmé"	Léo Delibes	Adriana Kohutkova and Denisa Slepkovska	6:37
8.	"Nadas Por Free"	Willy "Wil-Dog" Abers, Ulises Bella, Raul Pacheco, Justin Porée, Asdru Sierra and Jiro Yamaguchi	Ozomatli	2:57
9.	"Come and Get It"	Eli Paperboy Reed, Ryan Spraker and Michael Montgomery	Eli Paperboy Reed	3:33
10.	"Now You See It (Shake That Ass) (Benny Benassi and DJ Shimik Extended Mix)"	Armando C. Perez, Justin Roman, Vince Garcia, Tony Arazadon and Richard Bailey	Honorebel feat. Pitbull and Jump Smokers	3:25
11.	"M.A.D."	James Smith, Alice Spooner, Daniel Rice, Nick Rice and Chris Purcell	Hadouken!	3:25
12.	"I'm in the House"	Steve Aoki, William Adams and Justin Bates	Steve Aoki feat. Zuper Blahq	3:24

== Reception ==
The music was not favorably received well, with James McMahon of NME and Nick Schager of Slant Magazine describing it "awful" and "unexciting".

== Additional music ==
The following songs are not included in the soundtrack:

- "Show Me the Way to Go Home" by Mitch Miller & The Gang
- "I'm Not a Whore" by LMFAO
- "Fetish" by Far East Movement
- "Girls on the Dance Floor" by Far East Movement

== Original score ==
Piranha 3D (Original Motion Picture Score)

Film score by Michael Wandmacher
- Released: August 17, 2010
- Genre: Film score
- Length: 58:08
- Label: Lakeshore
- Producer: Michael Wandmacher

Michael Wandmacher chronology
Freakonomics (2010)	Piranha 3D (2010)	Drive Angry (2011)

=== Background ===
Michael Wandmacher composed the film score, who received the opportunity after scoring a demo piece. The motif that utilizes col legno string sound was used to represent fish teeth which Aja liked as it sounded like a piranha teeth and utilized the four note motif on strings, which he combined into a piece of music that served as the main theme. Aja described the score as "Bernard Herrmann meets Megadeth" as the score represented "chaos and train wreck with attack music" and wanted inspiration from John Williams' score for Jaws (1975).

The score accompanied a huge brass and string section where the brasses were sampled and strings were recorded live. Around 60 players were associated to record the strings live. The score further implements electronic and rock elements with Wandmacher playing guitar, as well as electric cello, along with drums and double guitars played in lower registers. The rest of the musical elements were implemented by synthesizer programming, which also included the percussion sounds.

=== Reception ===
James Southall of Movie Wave called it a "very enjoyable album" which had similarities in terms of Brian Tyler's action film scores, in terms of approach. "The music isn't subtle, by any means, but that could hardly be expected given the subject matter." Bill Gibron of PopMatters wrote "Aja seems to be making a motion picture satire that, while loaded with splatter, also acknowledges the masters of the horror genre who came before [and] Wandmacher is a more than willing accomplice in this design."

=== Track listing ===
No.	Title	Length
1.	"Whirlpool"	1:54
2.	"Piranha"	1:08
3.	"Empty Boat"	2:16
4.	"Cold Feet"	1:01
5.	"The Cave"	3:44
6.	"Pack Attack"	2:41
7.	"Mutiny"	1:08
8.	"Swimming for Blood"	2:00
9.	"The Bucket"	3:48
10.	"Marina Attack, Pt. 1"	2:09
11.	"Marina Attack, Pt. 2"	2:09
12.	"Bits and Pieces"	0:59
13.	"Trapped"	1:12
14.	"Seasick"	1:37
15.	"Massacred"	2:35
16.	"Rescued"	1:11
17.	"Prey"	1:08
18.	"Sunbathers"	1:02
19.	"Army of Teeth"	2:45
20.	"Connect the Boats"	4:05
21.	"Blood Red Sand"	2:26
22.	"Tightrope"	4:13
23.	"Bait"	1:16
24.	"Pressure Wave"	3:54
25.	"Breathe"	2:29
26.	"End Titles"	3:18
Total length:		58:08

=== Credits ===
Credits adapted from liner notes:

- Music composer, producer, synth programmer, guitar, electric cello, percussion – Michael Wandmacher
- Orchestrator – Chad Seiter, Michael Wandmacher, Susie Benchasil Seiter
- Conductor – Susie Benchasil Seiter
- Recording and mixing – Mark Curry
- Music editor – Joshua Winget
- Executive producer – Brian McNelis, Skip Williamson
- A&R director – Eric Craig
