= The Game (Alyssa Reid album) =

Studio album by Alyssa Reid
- Released: June 21, 2011
- Recorded: 2010–11
- Genre: Pop; R&B; dance-pop
- Length: 45:03
- Label: Wax Records
- Producer: Billy Steinberg; Jamie Appleby

Alyssa Reid chronology
The Game (2011)	Time Bomb (2014)

Singles from The Game
- 1. "Alone Again" Released: December 7, 2010; 2. "The Game" Released: May 31, 2011; 3. "Talk Me Down" Released: January 16, 2012

The Game is the debut studio album recorded by Canadian singer and songwriter Alyssa Reid. It contains 13 songs and it was released in Canada on June 21, 2011, by Wax Records. Internationally, the album was distributed by Ultra Records and was released to digital retailers in the United States in May 2013. "The Game" spawned three successful singles, including the worldwide hit "Alone Again".

== Background ==
After garnering exposure following a Top 6 placement on the first season of The Next Star, Reid caught the attention of Wax Records executive Jamie Appleby through her viral video for "One Less Lonely Boy" (a rebuttal song to Justin Bieber's "One Less Lonely Girl" and signed a recording contract with Wax Records in 2009. Between 2010 and 2011, Reid wrote and recorded songs that would comprise The Game.

== Singles ==
"Alone Again" serves as the first single and features Canadian rapper P Reign. The song heavily samples lyrics from Heart's 1987 hit "Alone". It was first released in Canada on December 7, 2010. The song was a domestic success, reaching 11 on the Canadian Hot 100 and being certified Gold by Music Canada. It was later re-issued in Europe with a featured vocal from the Jump Smokers in place of P. Reign. This version charted in Belgium, Ireland, the Netherlands, Scotland, and the United Kingdom, reaching the number two position on the national singles charts of the latter two.

The album's title track, "The Game", was released as the second single in May 2011. It earned Reid her second consecutive top 40 single in Canada. In 2012, a new version was recorded for the UK market and features rap vocals from Snoop Dogg.

"Talk Me Down" was serviced to Canadian radio in January 2012 as the third single from the album. The song's accompanying music video features an anti-bullying storyline and promoted Kids Help Phone, a Canadian telephone counselling service.

== Track listing ==
The Game – Physical standard edition
No.	Title	Writer(s)	Length
1.	"Letting Go"	Alyssa Reid	1:37
2.	"The Game" (featuring Snoop Dogg)	Reid; Jason Quenneville; Jamie Appleby	3:00
3.	"XO"	Reid; Quenneville; Appleby	4:09
4.	"Alone Again" (featuring P Reign)	Reid; Appleby; Billy Steinberg; Tom Kelly	3:49
5.	"Interlude"	Appleby	0:46
6.	"Talk Me Down"	Reid; Dave Thomson; Appleby; Jesse Labelle	3:25
7.	"The Dark Side"	Adam Alexander; Alex Vujic; Dan Kowarsky; Ryan Kowarsky	3:36
8.	"Go"	Reid; Quenneville; Appleby	4:47
9.	"Without You"	Reid; Appleby; Steve Fernandez	3:09
10.	"Burned"	Reid	3:43
11.	"Live to Tell"	Reid; Appleby; Kim Carnes; Marv Green	5:49
12.	"Alone Again, Pt.2" (featuring P. Reign and Jump Smokers)	Reid; Appleby; Steinberg; Kelly	3:09
13.	"Alone Again" (featuring Jump Smokers)	Reid; Appleby; Steinberg; Kelly	3:51
Total length:			45:03

The Game – Digital standard edition (bonus track)
No.	Title	Writer(s)	Length
14.	"Watch Me Soar"	Alyssa Reid	2:28
Total length:			47:31

== Chart performance ==
Chart (2011)	Peak position
Canadian Albums (Billboard)	25

== Release history ==
Country	Date	Format	Label	Catalog No.	Ref.
Canada	June 21, 2011	CD	Wax	WAX 700038	
Canada	May 15, 2012	Digital download	Wax	—N/a	
United States	May 7, 2013	Digital download	Ultra	—N/a	
