= The Game (Alyssa Reid song) =

Single by Alyssa Reid

from the album The Game
- Released: May 31, 2011
- Recorded: 2010
- Genre: Pop, R&B
- Length: 2:59
- Label: Wax Records, CP Records
- Songwriter(s): Alyssa Reid, Jamie Appleby
- Producer(s): Alyssa Reid, Dave Thomson, Jeff Dalziel, Jamie Appleby

Alyssa Reid singles chronology
"Alone Again" (2010)	"The Game" (2011)	"Heartbreak Coverup" (2012)

Music video
- "The Game" on YouTube

"The Game" is a song by The Next Star contestant Alyssa Reid from her 2011 album The Game. It is the title track of the album and the album's second single, as well as Alyssa's second most famous single, beat out by her previous single "Alone Again", officially released May 31, 2011. It was preceded by the album's lead single, "Alone Again", featuring P. Reign, which heavily sampled the 1987 Heart song "Alone", except included new verses and rap. "The Game" samples parts of the new verses of "Alone Again".

A radio edit was made of the song, which replaced the parts sampled from "Alone Again" and replaced them with new, original material. A remix was made of the song, featuring JDiggz, and in the parts where Reid is singing her verses, the radio edit of the song is sampled. The song is known by fans as "wanted to be in the movie for the best-selling book The Hunger Games". In 2012 a new single version was made for the UK market and features rap vocals from Snoop Dogg.

== Composition ==
"The Game" was written by Jamie Appleby and Alyssa Reid. It heavily samples the pre-chorus of "Alone Again" in that verse one has almost identical lyrics to the pre-chorus of "Alone Again" (When you [I] said I could move on and go, you said I'm weak and it shows I could move on without you, now I'm [you're] sitting in this [your] house alone, wondering why I left home, and I'm hoping that you know that), however in a different key, and verse two has different lyrics, and the different key as well. "The Game" is highly influenced by a piano high C minor chord, on a time signature of 4/4 and a beat of around 80 BPM. The song is an upbeat dance song, and a follow-up to "Alone Again", as said on her website. The differences between "Alone Again" and "The Game" is that while "Alone Again" is a softer, more vulnerable side of Alyssa, "The Game" is much more of a self-confident song celebrating individuality and emotional strength. "Everyone who knows me knows that I stand alone, it's all part of the game." (from the biography section of the official website of Alyssa Reid). Clearly, however, "Alone Again" and "The Game" have their similarities.

== Remixes ==
There are two official remixes of "The Game". One is a radio edit, with new verses that exclude the parts sampled from "Alone Again". It was released August 9, 2011 to worldwide radio stations and the iTunes Store.

The second remix features JDiggz and was released to the iTunes Store on October 24, 2011. It also replaces the verses sampled from "Alone Again" with the new verses from the radio edit. The radio edit achieved minor success through radio stations, the JDiggz remix achieved minor success through iTunes downloads, however, neither of them came close to the original Top 40 song.

After her sudden UK success, she caught the attention of Snoop Dogg who then agreed to feature on her next UK single, the new version of "The Game". It is released on August 31, 2012. Although this version shares the same name with the album version of "The Game", it contains new melodies, new arrangement and a rap verse by Snoop Dogg.

== Music video ==
An official music video for the song was released to YouTube on August 2, 2011 and was released to the iTunes Store on September 13, 2011.

=== Synopsis ===
The video begins with Reid sitting in the middle of crowds of people, mostly wearing dark colors. The words "Alyssa Reid", "The Game", and "Directed by Marc Andre Debruyne" appear and disappear quickly before the song starts. Then she stands up and starts singing. Occasionally, there are scenes of her singing in a lit-up alleyway. After the first verse is over, she appears singing the chorus in a blue room with fancy candlebras on the wall. There is a boy standing next to her, and the two seem to be ignoring each other completely. As scenes continue of her in the dark crowd and the lit-up alleyway, she turns to face the boy in the blue-room scene. Then, scenes appear of Reid walking past lines of people as she sings the second verse. She then performs for crowds in an old warehouse-like building. As the last chorus finishes, scenes show of her being lifted up by the dark crowd. The song finishes and the video fades away while she walks out of the lit-up alleyway.

== Track list ==
UK digital EP (with Snoop Dogg)
No.	Title	Length
1.	"The Game" (featuring Snoop Dogg; UK radio edit)	3:05
2.	"The Game" (featuring Snoop Dogg; Bimbo Jones radio edit)	2:30
3.	"The Game" (featuring Snoop Dogg; Sunship radio edit)	3:25
4.	"The Game" (featuring Snoop Dogg; Bimbo Jones mix)	5:27
5.	"The Game" (featuring Snoop Dogg; Sunship club mix)	5:08

iTunes EP (with Snoop Dogg)
No.	Title	Length
1.	"The Game" (featuring Snoop Dogg; UK version)	3:15
2.	"The Game" (featuring Snoop Dogg; US version)	3:10
3.	"The Game" (no rap version)	2:52
4.	"The Game" (featuring Snoop Dogg; Vocal Up UK version)	3:16

== Chart performance ==
Chart (2011)	Peak position
Belgium (Ultratip Bubbling Under Flanders)	24
Belgium (Ultratip Bubbling Under Wallonia)	19
Belgium Urban (BEA)	44
Canada (Canadian Hot 100)	35

== Release history ==
Region	Date	Format	Label
Canada	31 May 2011	Digital download	Wax Records
United States	21 August 2012	Digital download	Ultra
United Kingdom	23 September 2012	Digital download	All Around the World, 3 Beat
Ireland	23 September 2012	Digital download	All Around the World, 3 Beat
