= The London Sessions (Tiësto album) =

Studio album by Tiësto
- Released: 15 May 2020
- Studio: Sarm West, London
- Length: 42:38
- Label: Musical Freedom; PM:AM; Universal

Tiësto chronology
Together (2019)	The London Sessions (2020)	Together Again (2021)

Singles from The London Sessions
- 1. "Jackie Chan" Released: 18 May 2018; 2. "Ritual" Released: 31 May 2019; 3. "God Is a Dancer" Released: 20 September 2019; 4. "Blue" Released: 13 December 2019; 5. "Nothing Really Matters" Released: 17 April 2020

The London Sessions is the sixth studio album by Dutch DJ and record producer Tiësto. It was released on 15 May 2020 by Musical Freedom, PM:AM Recordings and Universal Music. The album features three collaborations, with Canadian producers Dzeko and Shaun Frank, and British producer Jonas Blue, as well as uncredited collaborations with Luis Torres, Gorgon City and Burns.

== Background and release ==
Tiësto said about the album:

I was very inspired by the music coming from London and the scene there. London has always been a great place to discover new music and artists that inspire me. Working with these incredible artists and making music in the great city of London has been a great experience and I am delighted to show you the recorded momentum that we have experienced these weeks in London. All the ideas for the London Sessions album started in London at Sarm Studios.

== Track listing ==
The track listing was revealed on social media on 7 May 2020.

No.	Title	Writer(s)	Producer(s)	Length
1.	"God Is a Dancer" (with Mabel)	Tijs Verwest; Hannah Barney; Joshua Wilkinson	Tiësto; Wilkinson; Cameron Gower Poole^{[v]}	2:48
2.	"Nothing Really Matters" (with Becky Hill)	Verwest; Kye Gibbon; Matthew Robson-Scott; Rebecca Hill; Ryan Campbell; Karen Poole; Joshua Record; Oliver Green	Tiësto; Gorgon City; Sergio Popken^{[a]}; Ryan Ashley^{[v]}	2:37
3.	"Ride" (featuring The Kid Daytona and Roe)	Verwest; Austin Donawa; Romika Faniel; Jamil Pierre	Tiesto; Deputy; Popken^{[a]}	3:24
4.	"Ritual" (with Jonas Blue and Rita Ora)	Verwest; Guy James Robin; Michael Stonebank; Grace Barker; Wayne Hector; Fraser Thornycroft-Smith	Tiësto; Jonas Blue; Stonebank	3:19
5.	"Jackie Chan" (with Dzeko featuring Preme and Post Malone)	Verwest; Julian Dzeko; Luis Raposo Torres; Austin Post; Louis Bell; Raynford Humphrey	Tiësto; Dzeko; Luis Torres; Preme; Wallis Lane^{[a]}	3:35
6.	"Lifestyle" (featuring Kamille)	Verwest; Camille Purcell; Sarah Blanchard; Linus Nordstrom; Victor Bolander	Tiesto; Goldfingers; Wax Motif^{[a]}; Ely Rise^{[a]}	2:42
7.	"On My California" (with Shaun Frank featuring Snoop Dogg and Fontwell)	Verwest; Shaun Frank; Aaron Fontwell; Yaakov Gruzman; Alexander Healy; Calvin Broadus Jr.	Tiesto; Frank; Luis Torres; Gruzman^{[a]}; AJ Healy^{[a]}	3:07
8.	"Blue" (featuring Steve Appleton)	Verwest; Sergio Popken; Stephen Appleton	Tiësto; Popken	2:48
9.	"Round & Round" (featuring Galxara)	Verwest; Lauren Christy; Neil Ormandy; Stuart Crichton; Riana "Galxara" Kuring	Tiesto; Crichton; Christy^{[c]}; Torres^{[a]}	3:17
10.	"Lose You" (featuring ILIRA)	Verwest; Ilira Gashi; Johannes Mueller	Tiesto; Joe Walter	2:30
11.	"Over You" (featuring Becky Hill)	Verwest; Alexander Kotz; Matthew Burns; Jamie Hartman; Hill	Tiesto; Burns; Popken^{[a]}; Ashley^{[v]}	2:26
12.	"What's It Gonna Be" (featuring Kamille)	Verwest; Purcell; Blanchard; Lindstrom; Bolander	Tiesto; Goldfingers; Popken^{[a]}	2:42
13.	"Insomnia" (featuring Violet Skies)	Verwest; Micah Jasper; Lucas Storrs; Barney	Tiesto; Storrs; Jasper^{[v]}	7:35
Total length:				42:38

Japan bonus tracks
No.	Title	Writer(s)	Producer(s)	Length
14.	"Nothing Really Matters" (Codeco Remix)	Verwest; Kye Gibbon; Matthew Robson-Scott; Rebecca Hill; Ryan Campbell; Karen Poole; Joshua Record; Oliver Green	Tiësto; Gorgon City; Sergio Popken^{[a]}; Ryan Ashley^{[v]}	3:04
15.	"Lose You" (Chico Rose Remix)	Verwest; Ilira Gashi; Johannes Mueller	Tiesto; Joe Walter	2:36
Total length:				48:30

Notes

- ^{^[c]} signifies a co-producer
- ^{^[a]} signifies an additional producer
- ^{^[v]} signifies a vocal producer

== Personnel and credits ==
Producers

- Tiësto
- Sergio Popken
- Luis Torres
- Goldfingers
- Josh Wilkinson
- Gorgon City
- Deputy
- Jonas Blue
- Stonebank
- Dzeko
- Preme
- Wallis Lane
- Max Motif
- Ely Rise
- Shaun Frank
- Yaakov Gruzman
- AJ Healy
- Stuart Crichton
- Lauren Christy
- Joe Walter
- Burns
- Luke Storrs

== Charts ==
Chart performance for The London Sessions
Chart (2020)	Peak position
Dutch Albums (Album Top 100)	54
Irish Albums (IRMA)	75
Lithuanian Albums (AGATA)	61
UK Albums (OCC)	64
UK Dance Albums (OCC)	12
US Top Dance Albums (Billboard)	10

== Certifications ==
Certifications for The London Sessions
Region	Certification	Certified units/sales
Poland (ZPAV)	Platinum	20,000^{‡}
United Kingdom (BPI)	Silver	60,000^{‡}
^{‡} Sales+streaming figures based on certification alone.
