= Alone Again (Alyssa Reid song) =

Single by Alyssa Reid featuring P. Reign or Jump Smokers

from the album The Game
- Released: 7 December 2010 (Canada); 29 January 2012 (Europe)
- Recorded: 2010
- Genre: Pop, hip hop, R&B
- Length: 3:49; 3:57 (Extended Mix); 3:09 (UK Radio Edit)
- Label: Wax Records
- Songwriter(s): Alyssa Reid, Billy Steinberg, Jamie Appleby, Tom Kelly
- Producer(s): Jeff "Diesel" Dalziel

Alyssa Reid singles chronology
"If You Are" (2010)	"Alone Again" (2010)	"The Game" (2011)

UK Remixes cover
- UK Remixes cover for "Alone Again" (feat. Jump Smokers).

Music video
- "Alone Again (featuring P. Reign)" on YouTube

"Alone Again" is a song by Canadian singer Alyssa Reid featuring P. Reign, based on the lyrics and music of the 1987 Heart song "Alone". The song was released in the United Kingdom featuring vocals from Jump Smokers.

"Alone Again" was released in November 2010, entering the Canadian Hot 100 at No. 79 for the week of January 1, 2011, and peaked at no. 11 the week of April 23, 2011. Alone Again was the top-selling and highest-charting single by a Canadian artist at Canadian radio in 2011. A different version with Jump Smokers was released internationally, becoming a major hit in parts of Europe, peaking within the top ten of the charts in Poland and the United Kingdom. Another version was made, which features vocals sections from both Jump Smokers and P. Reign.

== Music video ==
The music video was directed by Marc Andre DeBruyne. It was first released onto YouTube on 18 May 2011 at a total length of four minutes and five seconds. The video went to number one at MuchMusic and was nominated for a 2011 MMVA for 'Pop Video of the Year'.

== Track listing ==
Digital download (feat. P. Reign)

1. "Alone Again" (feat. P. Reign) - 3:57

UK digital download (feat. Jump Smokers)

1. "Alone Again" (UK Radio Edit) - 3:09
2. "Alone Again" (Original Mix) - 3:37
3. "Alone Again" (Sunship UK Radio Edit) - 3:08
4. "Alone Again" (Sunship Mix) - 5:22
5. "Alone Again" (Sunship Dub Mix) - 4:53
6. "Alone Again" (Steve Smart & Westfunk Radio Edit) - 3:10
7. "Alone Again" (Steve Smart & Westfunk Mix) - 5:15
8. "Alone Again" (Original US Radio Edit) - 3:48

== Charts ==
=== Weekly charts ===
Chart (2011–2012)	Peak position
Belgium (Ultratop 50 Flanders)	25
Canada (Canadian Hot 100)	11
Canada AC (Billboard)	4
Canada CHR/Top 40 (Billboard)	8
Canada Hot AC (Billboard)	4
Ireland (IRMA)	15
Netherlands (Single Top 100)	59
Poland (Polish Airplay Top 100)	3
Scotland (OCC)	2
Slovakia (Rádio Top 100)	2
UK Singles (OCC)	2

=== Year-end charts ===
Chart (2011)	Position
Canada (Canadian Hot 100)	24

Chart (2012)	Position
UK Singles (OCC)	90

== Certifications ==
Region	Certification	Certified units/sales
Canada (Music Canada)	Gold	40,000^{*}
United Kingdom (BPI)	Gold	400,000^{‡}
^{*} Sales figures based on certification alone.^{‡} Sales+streaming figures based on certification alone.

== Release history ==
Region	Date	Format	Label
Canada	7 December 2010	Digital download	Wax Records
United States	5 July 2011	Digital download	Ultra
United Kingdom	29 January 2012	Digital download	All Around the World, 3Beat
Ireland	29 January 2012	Digital download	All Around the World, 3Beat
Netherlands	29 January 2012	Digital download	All Around the World, 3Beat
