= Heartbreak Coverup =

Single by Jesse Labelle featuring Alyssa Reid

from the album Two
- Released: April 10, 2012
- Recorded: 2012
- Genre: Pop rock
- Length: 3:19
- Label: Wax; 3 Beat
- Songwriter(s): Rob James; Jesse Labelle; Dave Lichens; Luke McMaster; Alyssa Reid; Thomas Salter

Jesse Labelle singles chronology
"Lost" (2011)	"Heartbreak Coverup" (2012)	"One Last Night" (2012)

Alyssa Reid singles chronology
"The Game" (2011)	"Heartbreak Coverup" (2012)	"Talk Me Down" (2012)

"Heartbreak Coverup" is a song recorded by Canadian singer-songwriter Jesse Labelle for his second studio album, Two (2012), featuring guest vocals by Alyssa Reid. It was released in Canada through Wax Records as the lead single from the album on April 10, 2012. The song was written by Labelle and Reid along with Rob James, Dave Lichens, Luke McMaster, and Thomas "Tawgs" Salter. A remix EP was released in the UK through 3 Beat Records on May 19, 2013.

It was the first song of Labelle's career to hold a position on a Billboard chart, debuting at #82 on the Canadian Hot 100. "Heartbreak Coverup" earned Labelle the "Best New Group or Solo Artist" award in the genre of Hot AC at the 2012 Canadian Radio Music Awards.

== Composition ==
"Heartbreak Coverup" is a midtempo, piano-driven pop rock ballad with a duration of three minutes and nineteen seconds. It is composed in the key of B major and is set to a tempo of 77 BPM. Lyrically, the song describes a man drinking to dull or "cover up" the pain of his "heartbreak" and contemplating calling his ex, whom he can't seem to let go. Reid's vocal styling on the refrain contains influences of contemporary R&B.

== Music video ==
The video for "Heartbreak Coverup" was directed by Marc André Debruyne and premiered July 10, 2012.

== Synopsis ==
The video starts off with Jesse Labelle performing the song. Which eventually leads to Alyssa Ried.

== Track listing ==
Digital download

- "Heartbreak Coverup (feat. Alyssa Reid) [Radio Version]" - 3:19
- "Heartbreak Coverup (No Feature Version)" - 3:20

Remixes EP

- "Heartbreak Coverup (UK Radio Edit)" - 2:39
- "Heartbreak Coverup (Liam Keegan Radio Edit)" - 2:38
- "Heartbreak Coverup (Radio Edit)" - 3:19
- "Heartbreak Coverup (Liam Keegan Radio Edit)" - 3:25
- "Heartbreak Coverup (Liam Keegan Club Mix)" - 5:50
- "Heartbreak Coverup (Wideboys Radio Edit)" - 4:10
- "Heartbreak Coverup (Wideboys Remix)" - 6:11
- "Heartbreak Coverup (iStep Remix)" - 5:22
- "Heartbreak Coverup (iStep Dub Mix)" - 5:22

== Chart performance ==
Chart (2012)	Peak position
Canada (Canadian Hot 100)	46
Canada AC (Billboard)	13
Canada CHR/Top 40 (Billboard)	44
Canada Hot AC (Billboard)	12

== Certifications ==
Region	Certification	Certified units/sales
Canada (Music Canada)	Gold	40,000^{*}
^{*} Sales figures based on certification alone.
