= God Is a Dancer =

2019 single by Tiësto and Mabel

Single by Tiësto and Mabel

from the album The London Sessions
- Released: 20 September 2019
- Genre: Dance-pop
- Length: 2:48
- Label: Musical Freedom; PM:AM; Universal
- Songwriters: Violet Skies; Tijs Verwest; Josh Wilkinson
- Producers: Tiësto; Josh Wilkinson

Tiësto singles chronology
"Ritual" (2019)	"God Is a Dancer" (2019)	"Blue" (2019)

Mabel singles chronology
"Mad Love" (2019)	"God Is a Dancer" (2019)	"Loneliest Time of Year" (2019)

Music video
- "God Is a Dancer" on YouTube

"God Is a Dancer" is a song by Dutch DJ Tiësto and English singer Mabel. It was released by Musical Freedom on 20 September 2019 as the third single from Tiësto's sixth studio album The London Sessions (2020). The song is also featured as a bonus track on digital and streaming versions of Mabel's debut studio album High Expectations (2019). The song was written by Tiësto, Violet Skies and Josh Wilkinson, and produced by Tiësto and Wilkinson.

== Background ==
Mabel teased the release of the song on her Instagram with the lines "Are You Feeling That Fire?" and "Cause the Music Is on the Way" on 17 September 2019. On 18 September 2019, Tiësto revealed the release date and cover art on his social media. Upon release, a website was set up with the title of the song. It was made available for pre-save on iTunes and Spotify at the same time.

== Live performance ==
Mabel performed "God Is a Dancer" on The Jonathan Ross Show on 9 November 2019.

== Track listing ==
Digital download
No.	Title	Length
1.	"God Is a Dancer"	2:48

Digital download – Acoustic
No.	Title	Length
1.	"God Is a Dancer" (Acoustic)	2:53

Digital download – James Hype Remix
No.	Title	Length
1.	"God Is a Dancer" (James Hype Remix)	2:53

== Charts ==
=== Weekly charts ===
Chart (2019–2020)	Peak position
Belgium (Ultratop 50 Flanders)	48
Belgium (Ultratip Bubbling Under Wallonia)	25
CIS Airplay (TopHit)	7
Croatia (HRT)	22
Czech Republic Airplay (ČNS IFPI)	36
Euro Digital Song Sales (Billboard)	17
Germany (GfK)	95
Greece International (IFPI)	93
Hungary (Dance Top 40)	24
Hungary (Rádiós Top 40)	15
Hungary (Single Top 40)	39
Ireland (IRMA)	25
Lithuania (AGATA)	72
Netherlands (Dutch Top 40)	16
Netherlands (Single Top 100)	37
New Zealand Hot Singles (RMNZ)	16
Poland (Polish Airplay Top 100)	12
Russia Airplay (TopHit)	7
Scotland Singles (OCC)	9
Slovakia Airplay (ČNS IFPI)	68
Slovenia (SloTop50)	48
Sweden (Sverigetopplistan)	56
UK Singles (OCC)	15
US Dance Club Songs (Billboard)	1
US Hot Dance/Electronic Songs (Billboard)	13

=== Year-end charts ===
Chart (2019)	Position
CIS (Tophit)	154
Netherlands (Dutch Top 40)	77
Poland (ZPAV)	81
Russia Airplay (Tophit)	132
Chart (2020)	Position
Hungary (Rádiós Top 40)	62
US Hot Dance/Electronic Songs (Billboard)	57

== Certifications ==
Region	Certification	Certified units/sales
Brazil (Pro-Música Brasil)	Platinum	40,000^{‡}
Poland (ZPAV)	Platinum	50,000^{‡}
United Kingdom (BPI)	Platinum	600,000^{‡}
^{‡} Sales+streaming figures based on certification alone.

== See also ==
- List of Billboard number-one dance songs of 2019
