= Blue (Tiësto song) =

Single by Tiësto featuring Stevie Appleton

from the album The London Sessions
- Released: 13 December 2019
- Genre: Dance-pop; country pop
- Length: 2:47
- Label: Musical Freedom; PM:AM; Universal
- Songwriters: Tijs Verwest; Stephen Appleton; Sergio Popken
- Producers: Tiësto; Sergio Popken

Tiësto singles chronology
"God Is a Dancer" (2019)	"Blue" (2019)	"Nothing Really Matters" (2020)

Stevie Appleton singles chronology
"Sinner" (2019)	"Blue" (2019)	"Paradise" (2020)

"Blue" is a song by Dutch disc jockey and producer Tiësto with vocals by British singer and songwriter Stevie Appleton. It was released on 13 December 2019 by Musical Freedom in the Netherlands as the fourth single from Tiësto's seventh studio album The London Sessions.

== Background and release ==
Tiësto declared about the song : "I wanted to end the year with a track that is a different vibe for me – the exploration of different sounds and styles is what keeps things fresh and energizing for me as an artist. 2019 has been a year of experimentation with different artists and across various sounds, styles, and genres, which I plan to continue into 2020. ‘Blue’ is the perfect way to cap off an incredible decade, and I'm really excited to share a new song that I really love, ahead of the holidays."

== Reception ==
Ryan Ford from the webmedia We Rave You found that Tiësto "has demonstrated how versatile he can be when it comes to genre experimentation and production, crafting a delightful, mellifluous platform upon which Appleton’s vocal talents shine through too." Katie Stone from the webmedia EDM.com noticed that "The single evokes Avicii-esque elements, incorporating a slight country beat alongside the melancholic lyrics. It's a refreshing drop from the legendary artist."

== Music video ==
The music video was premiered on Tiësto's official YouTube channel on 11 February 2020. It was directed by Ben Fee and it features the dancer Nico Lonetree.

== Track listing ==
Digital Download

1. "Blue" – 2:47

Digital Download – Remixes

1. "Blue" (Mike Williams Remix) – 3:11
2. "Blue" (Wh0 Remix) – 3:52
3. "Blue" (Dirty South Remix) – 3:34
4. "Blue" (Moska Remix) – 2:53
5. "Blue" – 2:47

== Charts ==
Chart (2019–20)	Peak position
Belgium Dance (Ultratop Flanders)	23
Poland (Polish Airplay Top 100)	3
Romania (Airplay 100)	86
US Hot Dance/Electronic Songs (Billboard)	35

== Certifications ==
Region	Certification	Certified units/sales
Poland (ZPAV)	2× Platinum	100,000^{‡}
^{‡} Sales+streaming figures based on certification alone.
