= Nothing Really Matters (Becky Hill and Tiësto song) =

Song by Tiësto and Becky Hill

Single by Tiësto and Becky Hill

from the album The London Sessions
- Released: 17 April 2020
- Length: 2:37
- Label: Musical Freedom; PM:AM; Universal
- Songwriters: Tijs Verwest; Kye Gibbon; Matthew Robson-Scott; Rebecca Hill; Ryan Campbell; Karen Poole; Joshua Record; Ollie Green
- Producers: Gorgon City; Tiësto; Sergio Popken

Tiësto singles chronology
"Blue" (2019)	"Nothing Really Matters" (2020)	"Coffee (Give Me Something)" (2020)

Becky Hill singles chronology
"Better Off Without You" (2020)	"Nothing Really Matters" (2020)	"Heaven On My Mind" (2020)

"Nothing Really Matters" is a song by Dutch DJ and record producer Tiësto and English singer and songwriter Becky Hill. It was released as a single on 17 April 2020 by Musical Freedom as the fifth single from Tiësto's seventh studio album The London Sessions. The song was written by Josh Record, Karen Poole, Kye Gibbon, Matt Robson-Scott, Ollie Green, Rebecca Claire Hill, Ryan Ashley and Tijs Verwest. The song peaked at number 76 on the UK Singles Chart.

== Background ==
Hill said in an interview with The Sun's Bizarre column, "I wrote four songs for Tiësto during a writing camp last year. I like to have a concept at the start of sessions but we didn't have anything particular in mind. Then we started writing about the world ending. It was all written and done last summer but it feels really fitting with the situation we're in now."

== Personnel ==
Credits adapted from Tidal.

- Kye Gibbon – producer, composer, lyricist
- Matt Robson-Scott – producer, composer, lyricist
- Sergio Popken – producer, additional producer, mixer, studio personnel
- Tijs Verwest – producer, composer, lyricist, associated performer, music production
- Josh Record – composer, lyricist
- Karen Poole – composer, lyricist
- Ollie Green – composer, lyricist
- Rebecca Claire Hill – composer, lyricist, associated performer, vocals
- Ryan Ashley – composer, lyricist, associated performer, vocal producer
- Kevin Grainger – mastering engineer, studio personnel

== Charts ==
=== Weekly charts ===
Chart (2020)	Peak position
Belgium (Ultratip Bubbling Under Flanders)	6
Belgium (Ultratip Bubbling Under Wallonia)	11
Czech Republic Airplay (ČNS IFPI)	50
Netherlands (Dutch Top 40)	17
Netherlands (Single Top 100)	56
Scotland Singles (OCC)	80
UK Singles (OCC)	76
US Hot Dance/Electronic Songs (Billboard)	24

=== Year-end charts ===
Chart (2020)	Position
Netherlands (Dutch Top 40)	95

== Release history ==
Region	Date	Format	Label
United Kingdom	17 April 2020	Digital download	Musical Freedom
