= Dzeko (DJ) =

Canadian DJ and record producer (born 1992)

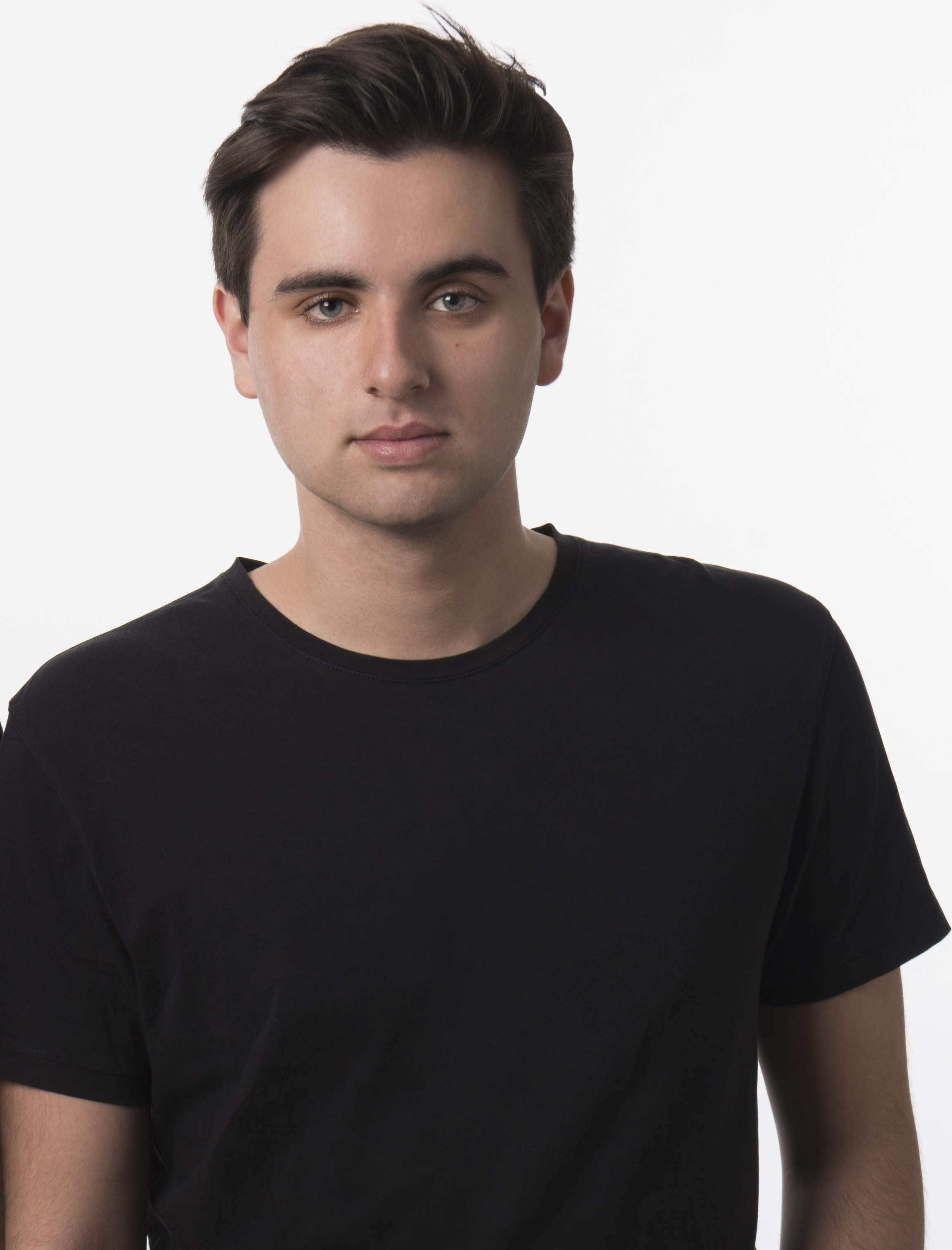

Background information
- Born: Julian Dzeko; May 3, 1992 (age 34); Toronto, Ontario, Canada
- Genres: Future house; electro house; progressive house; big room house; dance-pop; future bass
- Occupations: DJ; record producer
- Label: Musical Freedom • Universal
- Formerly of: Dzeko & Torres

Julian Dzeko (born May 3, 1992), known mononymously as Dzeko, is a Canadian DJ and record producer.

Dzeko released "Liberty" as a single on December 12, 2016, as well as "Never Gonna Love Me" on February 2, 2017 on Armada Deep. He has also put up remixes on his SoundCloud page for the songs "Paris" and "Something Just Like This" by The Chainsmokers and "Congratulations" and "Circles" by Post Malone. On December 8, 2017, Dzeko was invited by the Harvard College Electronic Music Collective to lecture on the state of the music industry.

In 2018, Dzeko collaborated with Dutch DJ Tiësto alongside featured guests Preme and Post Malone, to release the single "Jackie Chan".

== Personal life ==
Dzeko is the older brother of Canadian actress Eliana Jones.

== Discography ==
=== Charted singles ===
Title	Year	Peak chart positions								Certification	Album
Title	Year	CAN	AUS	BEL (FL)	IRE	NL	SWE	UK	US	Certification	Album
"Jackie Chan" (with Tiësto featuring Preme and Post Malone)	2018	7	13	15	6	7	20	5	52	ARIA: Platinum; BPI: 2× Platinum	The London Sessions

=== Singles ===
List of singles, showing year released and album name
Title	Year
"Liberty"	2016
"Never Gonna Love Me" (featuring Sam James)	2017
"Fluxland 2017"	2017
"California" (featuring Brynn Elliot)	2017
"Heart Speak" (featuring Toka-J)	2017
"In Too Deep"	2017
"Sleepless" (with Jonas Hahn featuring Richard Craker)	2017
"Blue" (featuring F4ST)	2018
"Try Not To Love You" (with Aspyer featuring Matluck)	2018
"Anthem" (with Riggi & Piros)	2018
"Hypebeat" (with Kris Kaiden)	2018
"Don't Stop" (with Liu)	2018
"Heaven" (with Riggi & Piros featuring Veronica)	2019
"Halfway There" (with Tiësto featuring Lena Leon)	2019
"The King" (with Dimitri Vangelis & Wyman)	2019
"Down On It" (with DJ D-Sol featuring Kool & The Gang)	2019
"Popcorn" (with Steve Aoki and Ummet Ozcan)	2019
"Both Still Young" (with Keith Urban)	2020

=== Remixes ===
List of remixes, showing year released and original artists
Title	Year	Original artist
"That Hill" (Dzeko Remix)	2015	Bedrud and Ask:Me (featuring Nik Felice)
"Paris" (Dzeko Remix)	2017	The Chainsmokers
"Congratulations" (Dzeko Remix)	2017	Post Malone
"Something Just Like This" (Dzeko Remix)	2017	The Chainsmokers and Coldplay
"Just Be" (Dzeko Remix)	2017	Tiësto
"Mama" (Dzeko Remix)	2017	Jonas Blue (featuring William Singe)
"Look At Us Now" (Dzeko Remix)	2017	Lost Kings (featuring Ally Brooke and ASAP Ferg)
"Less Lonely" (Dzeko Remix)	2017	Frank Walker
"There for You" (Dzeko Remix)	2017	Martin Garrix and Troye Sivan
"Unforgettable" (Tiësto vs. Dzeko AFTR:HRS Remix)	2017	French Montana (featuring Swae Lee)
"Heart Speak" (Dzeko vs Waves Remix)	2018	Dzeko (featuring Toka-J)
"El Paradiso" (Dzeko Remix)	2018	DJ Antoine (featuring Armando and Jimmi The Dealer)
"Addicted" (Dzeko Remix)	2018	Shaun Frank (featuring Violet Days)
"Body" (Dzeko Remix)	2018	Loud Luxury (featuring Brando)
"Might Not Love Me" (Dzeko Remix)	2018	Brynn Elliot
"Love in the Dark" (Dzeko Remix)	2020	Jessie Reyez
"In The Night" (Dzeko Remix)	2020	Joy Club
"When You're Home" (Dzeko Remix)	2021	Tyler Shaw
"Country Roads, Take Me Home" (2024 Remix)	2024	John Denver
