= Alyssa Reid =

Canadian singer-songwriter

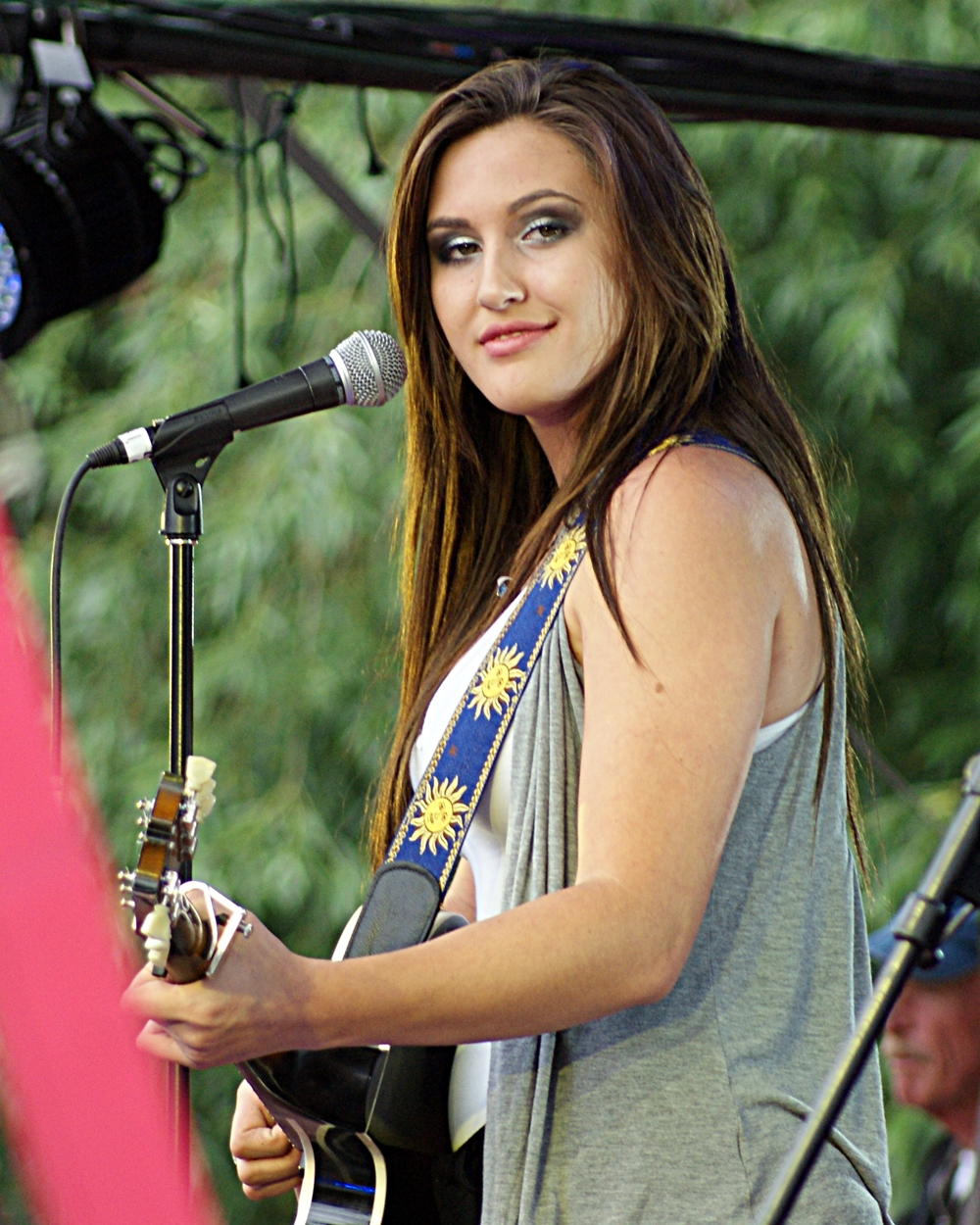
- Reid performing at the 2011 Calgary Stampede

Background information
- Born: Alyssa Ashley Reid; March 15, 1993 (age 33); Edmonton, Alberta, Canada
- Origin: Brampton, Ontario, Canada
- Genres: R&B; pop; hip hop; dance
- Occupations: Singer-songwriter, guitarist, keyboardist
- Instruments: Vocals; piano; guitar; bass
- Years active: 2010–present
- Labels: Wax, 3Beat, Universal Music Canada, Republic, Polydor, Ultra Records
- Formerly of: Artists Against Bullying
- Website: alyssareid.com

Alyssa Ashley Reid (born March 15, 1993) is a Canadian singer-songwriter. Her career began in 2008 on The Next Star. She rose to fame in 2011, following the release of her single "Alone Again". From 2018-2020, she released music under the name ASHS.

== Early life ==
Reid was born in Edmonton, Alberta, and raised in Brampton, Ontario. Her family moved around Canada often. Reid stated that it gave her the life experience she needed to enter the music industry. She is of Irish, Ukrainian and Greek heritage. She wrote her first song at the age of 7 and started vocal lessons at the age of 9. From then on, she has continued to develop her voice into what has become a singular vocal style. She went to St. Thomas Aquinas Catholic Performing Arts School from grades 9 to 11, and then attended Chinguacousy Secondary School through to graduation.

== Career ==
=== 2010–2011: Career beginnings and The Game ===
Reid was soon discovered by writer, producer, and Wax Records co-founder Jamie Appleby, who signed her to his label after finding a parody of Justin Bieber's "One Less Lonely Girl" (titled "One Less Lonely Boy") that she had posted on YouTube, which went viral.

Her single "Alone Again" featuring P. Reign, released in November 2010, uses lyrics from Heart's 1987 hit "Alone", and was co-written with Wax Records label owner Jamie Appleby, with the original Heart writers Billy Steinberg and Tom Kelly. The song entered the Canadian Hot 100 at #79 for the week of January 1, 2011, and peaked at #11 the week of April 23, 2011. As of the week of September 24, 2011, the single has spent 39 weeks on the chart. It went on to be CRIA certified double platinum in Canada and sold over a million copies around the world.

In February 2011, she reached #1 on Billboard's "Canadian Emerging Artist" chart and held there for a record-breaking 33 weeks straight. Her single "The Game" was released on May 31, 2011, and entered the Canadian Hot 100 at #89 for the week of August 3, 2011, peaking at #35 as of the week of September 24, 2011. In February 2012, "Alone Again" achieved major success in the United Kingdom, where it peaked at number two on the UK Singles Chart, beaten to the summit by "Titanium" by David Guetta featuring Sia. On April 27, 2011, she performed her debut single "Alone Again" at the University of Chester, along with several other covers.

Reid was nominated for a 2011 MuchMusic Video Award for Pop Video of the Year for "Alone Again". Her first ever visit to the UK involved a series of interviews with BBC Radio 1, Capital FM and a live interview with Fame Factor TV.

The Game was her debut studio album, recorded in 2010 and released on June 21, 2011 by Wax Records that contains 13 songs. Reid worked with composers and producers such as Billy Steinberg and Jamie Appleby. The album was released in the US as a digital download on May 7, 2013.

Reid performed at the 2012 Juno Awards on April 1, 2012, and was nominated in the "Best New Artist" category.

=== 2011–2017: Touring, Time Bomb, Phoenix and singles ===
On October 1, 2011, Reid began touring with Neverest for the Canadian Tour 2011. Reid started her first UK Tour in April 2012 by promoting her single "Alone Again". During this time, Reid was also featured on Wax Records label-mate Jesse Labelle's 2012 single "Heartbreak Coverup".

In September 2013, Reid released the single "Satisfaction Guaranteed", which rose to #25 on the Canadian Hot 100. On February 11, 2014, her second studio album Time Bomb was released. It features 12 songs including "Hurricane" (released in the same year), and two other singles ("Running Guns" and "Satisfaction Guaranteed") that had been released a year earlier. Reid, along with Danny Fernandes and JRDN, joined Hedley on their Wild Live 2014 Canadian Tour, which began on February 14, 2014. Reid also toured across Canada alongside label-mate Virginia to Vegas for her "The Time Bomb Tour", which began October 16, 2014.

On July 10, 2015, Reid released a new single titled "Dangerous", featuring The Heist. She released "Tomorrow" on November 2 of the same year. Reid's third album Phoenix was released on November 27, 2015.

On June 6, 2016, Reid announced that her single "Rollercoaster" would be released on June 17, and will be featured on her upcoming fourth album. Said album has yet to materialise with the singles "The Badlands" and "High".

=== 2018–present: ASHS ===
Reid took to Instagram on October 3, 2019, to announce that she has been releasing music under the alias ASHS. She also announced that will be working with Wax Records, the Universal Music Group, Republic Records and Polydor to bring ASHS to the "forefront of [her] my focus". As of October 2019, she has released two extended plays under the ASHS alias: 3AM Pt. 1 and 3AM Pt. 2. She has also released four singles, "Without You", "Paranoid", "My Ex" and "Don't Call Me", under Universal Music Canada.

== Personal life ==
She attended University of Toronto, majoring in Environmental Studies. After that, she worked with various artists in Sweden, Los Angeles and Toronto as a songwriter and creative director. Reid currently plays rugby for the Toronto Scottish R.F.C.

== Discography ==
=== Studio albums ===
List of studio albums, with selected chart positions
Title	Album details	Peak chart positions
Title	Album details	CAN
The Game	Released: June 21, 2011; Label: Wax; Format: CD, digital download	25
Time Bomb	Released: February 11, 2014; Label: Wax; Format: CD, digital download	—
Phoenix	Released: November 27, 2015; Label: Wax; Format: CD, digital download	—
ASHS	Released: December 10, 2021; Label: Wax; Format: CD, digital download	—
"—" denotes a recording that did not chart or was not released in that territory.

=== Extended plays ===
List of extended plays, with EP details
Title	EP details
Burnout	Released: June 15, 2018; Label: Wax; Format: Digital download
3AM Pt. 1 (as ASHS)	Released: 2018; Label: Wax; Format: Digital download
3AM Pt. 2 (as ASHS)	Released: 2019; Label: Wax; Format: Digital download

=== Singles ===
==== As lead artist ====
List of singles as lead artist, with selected chart positions and certifications, showing year released and album name
Title	Year	Peak chart positions										Certifications	Album
Title	Year	CAN	CAN AC	CAN CHR	CAN HAC	BEL (FL)	BEL (WA)	IRL	NL	SCO	UK	Certifications	Album
"If You Are"	2010	—	—	—	—	—	—	—	—	—	—		Non-album single
"Alone Again" (featuring P. Reign or Jump Smokers) (Note: "Alone Again" was credited alongside featured artist P. Reign in all countries bar the United Kingdom, where Jump Smokers appeared as the featured artist.)	2010	11	4	8	4	25	—	15	59	2	2	MC: Gold; BPI: Gold	The Game
"The Game"	2011	35	—	21	22	— (Note: "The Game" did not enter the Ultratop 50 but peaked at number 24 on the Flemish Ultratip chart.)	— (Note: "The Game" did not enter the Ultratop 50 but peaked at number 19 on the Wallonian Ultratip chart.)	—	—	—	—		The Game
"Talk Me Down"	2012	81	17	32	46	—	—	—	—	—	—		The Game
"Running Guns"	2013	—	—	38	48	—	—	—	—	—	—		Time Bomb
"Satisfaction Guaranteed"	2013	25	22	11	18	—	—	—	—	—	—	MC: Gold	Time Bomb
"Dangerous" (featuring The Heist)	2015	63	14	22	24	—	—	—	—	—	—		Phoenix
"Rollercoaster"	2016	—	46	—	35	—	—	—	—	—	—		Non-album singles
"Badlands" (featuring Likewise)	2016	—	—	22	40	—	—	—	—	—	—		Non-album singles
"Roses"	2022	—	—	24	—	—	—	—	—	—	—		TBA
"—" denotes a recording that did not chart or was not released in that territory.

==== As featured artist ====
List of singles as featured artist, with selected chart positions and certifications, showing year released and album name
Title	Year	Peak chart positions				Certifications	Album
Title	Year	CAN	CAN AC	CAN CHR	CAN HAC	Certifications	Album
"Heartbreak Coverup" (Jesse Labelle featuring Alyssa Reid)	2012	46	13	44	12	MC: Gold	Two
"True Colors" (with Artists Against Bullying)	2012	10	—	—	—		Non-album single
"We Are Stars" (Virginia to Vegas featuring Alyssa Reid)	2014	14	13	11	14	MC: Platinum	Utopian
"Somebody Like You" (Owen Barney featuring Alyssa Reid)	2019	—	—	—	—		Diamonds & Dust
"—" denotes a recording that did not chart or was not released in that territory.

==== Christmas singles ====
Title	Year	Peak chart positions		Album
Title	Year	CAN	CAN AC	Album
"Mistress Claus"	2012	—	20	Now! Christmas 6
"Baby, It's Cold Outside" (with Virginia to Vegas)	2014	—	5	Non-album singles
"Santa, Why'd You Do It!?" (featuring The Heist)	2015	—	—	Non-album singles
"—" denotes a recording that did not chart or was not released in that territory.

== Awards and nominations ==
Year	Ceremony	Nominated work	Category	Result
2011	MuchMusic Video Awards	"Alone Again"	Pop Video of the Year	Nominated
2012	MuchMusic Video Awards	"The Game"	Most Streamed Video of the Year	Nominated
2012	Juno Awards	Herself	New Artist of the Year	Nominated
2012	SOCAN Urban Music Award	"Alone Again"	Pop/Rock Music Awards	Won

== See also ==
- The Next Star
