= Mad Love (Mabel song) =

2019 single by Mabel

Single by Mabel

from the album High Expectations
- Released: 7 June 2019
- Studio: Rokstone, London
- Genre: Electropop; R&B
- Length: 2:49
- Label: Polydor
- Songwriters: Mabel McVey; Steve Mac; Camille Purcell
- Producer: Steve Mac

Mabel singles chronology
"Don't Call Me Up" (2019)	"Mad Love" (2019)	"God Is a Dancer" (2019)

Music video
- "Mad Love" on YouTube

"Mad Love" is a song by English singer Mabel from her debut studio album, High Expectations (2019). She wrote the song with Camille Purcell and its producer Steve Mac, wanting to express mutual attraction in a simple way. It is an electropop track with bouncy synths, a quiet-loud dynamic and repetitive chorus hook.

The song was released by Polydor Records on 7 June 2019 as the album's second single and received generally positive reviews from music critics. "Mad Love" peaked at number eight on the UK Singles Chart, making it Mabel's third single to reach the top 10 in the UK. It also charted in the top 10 in Ireland and Poland, and the top 40 in Greece, Lithuania and the Netherlands. The accompanying music video, directed by Marc Klasfeld, shows the singer performing choreography with a float of dancers.

== Background ==
Mabel wrote "Mad Love" with Camille Purcell and Steve Mac during their first writing session together after writing her previous single "Don't Call Me Up" (2019). Due to busy schedules, they had to set aside a day when they could all attend the writing session. The singer recalls that there was "something positive in the air" because of her intention to eschew her tendency to write intense breakup songs in favour of "a happy one about that fun moment when you meet somebody and you're just into each other."

Mabel wrote the song with a nightclub setting in mind and experimented with the simplest way to express mutual romantic liking without being boring. She cites the lyric "Mad love" as the "spark of the song" with it being one of her personal catchphrases, and "Put it / Don't let me down, do-do-down" as one of the lines that came first during the process. Mabel took a strong liking to this line, finding it catchy, sassy and confident, thus using it in every section of the song. It was also important to her that "Mad Love" empowered women. In an interview for Genius, the singer explained: "I grew up in an era of listening to 'Independent Women' and 'Survivor' and had songs that made me feel powerful as a woman, and I could do anything. And I'm always thinking that I want to send that message."

The most challenging part of the writing process for Mabel was the simple chorus because of her preference for writing verses and her tendency to overthink lyrics and tell a story. She said, "It's literally just, 'All night give me mad love. All night give me mad love. All night give me mad love.' That's it. I feel so proud of that chorus just because it's so different to anything else I've ever done." The song was recorded at Rokstone Studios in London.

== Composition ==
"Mad Love"
A nine-second sample of "Mad Love" featuring the repetitive chorus hook, performed by Mabel in vocal cuts.

"Mad Love" is composed in the key of C minor with a tempo of 99 beats per minute. Like "Don't Call Me Up", it has a more pop-indebted sound than those of Mabel's previous releases. It is characterised as an electropop song. The production uses keyboards, guitar, bouncy synths, and a Western drum pattern created by a drum machine. It has a dynamic that alternates between quiet and loud. Mabel uses vocal licks and a husky R&B style in her performance. In the chorus, the repetitive hook is performed in vocal cuts. Background vocals by Purcell are edited to sound low throughout.

According to Mabel, the lyrics have a simple message of "how good it feels when you like somebody and they like you". In the verses, she describes approaching a guy she is attracted to in a nightclub and telling him to back up what he says to her with his actions. She then does not want to play a game anymore and admits how she feels about him. The pre-chorus has a theme of women's empowerment, with Mabel asserting her sexuality by proactively speaking to the guy, instead of waiting for him to talk to her. The second verse includes the line, "One shot, don't let it go", a reference to Mabel's 2018 single "One Shot".

== Release and promotion ==
On 4 June 2019, Mabel announced the release of "Mad Love" on social media. She shared its cover art and a link to pre-save the song on Spotify and pre-add it on Apple Music. A 15-second snippet of the track premiered on TikTok the following day, allowing users to use the clip in their own videos ahead of the single's official release. On 9 June 2019, "Mad Love" hoodies and pom-pom keyrings were made available for purchase on Mabel's website. On 12 June 2019, a #MadLoveTrain hashtag challenge was launched to promote the single on TikTok. On 27 June 2019, a vertical video for the song premiered exclusively on Spotify. "Mad Love" was also promoted with its own lens filter on Snapchat on 11 July 2019. An animated lyric video was released on YouTube on 19 July 2019.

== Critical response ==
"Mad Love" received generally positive reviews from music critics. Robin Murray of Clash called the song "a bold return" and "a blast of positive energy in an increasingly dark world, with its searing melodies underlining Mabel's astonishing promise". Writing in their column for Billboard, Gab Ginsberg and Jason Lipshutz commented, "Impossibly, 'Mad Love' is almost even catchier" than "Don't Call Me Up". NME's Hannah Mylrea likened the track's "formula of brilliantly brash lyrics and a powerhouse chorus" to those of "Don't Call Me Up". Chris Taylor of DIY regarded it as an excellent single with "one of those seriously catchy pre-choruses that is guaranteed to set any pre-drinks aflame."

Gavin Haynes wrote in The Guardian that the production is "best described as 'Spotify'" and the lyrics "feel like they've been heavily workshopped to ride the line between teen-pleasing filth and daytime radio play", but "with a quiet-loud dynamic tighter than a duck's designer vagina, it's a hit." In The Observer, Kitty Empire bemoaned that songs with similarly sexual lyrics already existed in large numbers and Mabel's "model" of "Rihanna's husky, catch-in-the-throat R&B" was "overdone when everyone from Anne-Marie to Zara Larsson affects the same sexpot weariness."

== Commercial performance ==
"Mad Love" debuted at number 18 on the UK Singles Chart with 19,465 units in first-week sales. With 32,254 units sold in its fourth week, the song peaked at number eight, becoming Mabel's third single to reach the top 10 in the UK. In March 2020, it was certified platinum by the British Phonographic Industry for selling 600,000 units. On the Irish Singles Chart, it peaked at number six, becoming Mabel's second consecutive single to chart inside the top 10.

== Music video ==
=== Background and release ===
The music video for "Mad Love" was directed by Marc Klasfeld. It was produced by Kareem Adeshina and choreographed by Amber Rimell. Regarding the inspiration behind the video, Mabel said she wanted it to avoid a narrative and instead be simple like the song. It was inspired by music videos the singer grew up watching that were "just about sexy choreography, amazing lighting and sick glam."

A 15-second teaser of the video was shared on TikTok on 5 June 2019. At 08:30 BST on 7 June 2019, the music video live premiered on YouTube, preceded by a live chat with Mabel. Two behind-the-scenes videos were released on 28 June and 4 July 2019, respectively.

=== Synopsis and reception ===
The video opens with Mabel and a float of female dancers standing in a silhouette lit in blue. The singer then appears in a mirrored room wearing a pink crop top, white lace pants, a blue feather boa and wavy pink wig. During the chorus, Mabel performs a choreography routine backed by the dancers. In this segment, she wears a red crop top, boy shorts and a black bob cut wig. In the second verse, she poses wrapped in sheer material in front of a silhouette of speakers. Scenes from the dance sequence are lit in red, and three of the dancers are shown sitting on the speakers. During the second chorus, Mabel lies on a white platform. For the final chorus, she is circled by dancers flashing lights on her.

Madeline Roth of MTV News wrote that the video "flaunts [Mabel's] chameleonic style" and has "slick dance sequences". Gavin Haynes of The Guardian commented: "The PVC cladding may be more Ann Summers than Berghain". The music video has received over 90 million views on YouTube.

== Live performances ==
Mabel gave her first live performance of "Mad Love" at Parklife in Heaton Park on 9 June 2019. On 1 July 2019, the singer performed an acoustic version on MTV Push. She performed "Mad Love" on Australian music television show The Loop on 4 August 2019. Mabel also performed the song acoustic for BBC Radio 1's Live Lounge on 6 August 2019. On 1 November 2019, the singer performed "Mad Love" in a medley with "Don't Call Me Up" on German television show Luke! Die Greatnightshow.

== Track listing ==
Digital download
No.	Title	Length
1.	"Mad Love"	2:49

Digital download – Remixes
No.	Title	Length
1.	"Mad Love" (Blinkie Remix)	3:20
2.	"Mad Love" (Syn Cole Remix)	2:49
3.	"Mad Love" (Leftwing : Kody Remix)	3:15

Digital download – Acoustic
No.	Title	Length
1.	"Mad Love" (Acoustic)	2:52

== Personnel ==
Credits adapted from the liner notes of High Expectations.

- Mabel – vocals
- Camille Purcell – background vocals
- Steve Mac – keyboards, production
- Chris Laws – drums, engineering
- Tim Laws – guitar
- Dann Pursey – engineering
- Mark "Spike" Stent – mixing
- Michael Freeman – mixing assistance
- Stuart Hawkes – mastering

== Charts ==
=== Weekly charts ===
Chart (2019)	Peak position
Australia (ARIA)	67
Austria (Ö3 Austria Top 40)	56
Belgium (Ultratop 50 Flanders)	50
Belgium (Ultratip Bubbling Under Wallonia)	10
Canada CHR/Top 40 (Billboard)	45
China Airplay/FL (Billboard)	16
Croatia (HRT)	54
Czech Republic Airplay (ČNS IFPI)	66
Czech Republic Singles Digital (ČNS IFPI)	74
Euro Digital Song Sales (Billboard)	18
Germany (GfK)	54
Greece International (IFPI)	32
Hungary (Single Top 40)	14
Ireland (IRMA)	6
Lithuania (AGATA)	30
Mexico Ingles Airplay (Billboard)	16
Netherlands (Dutch Top 40)	19
Netherlands (Single Top 100)	33
New Zealand Hot Singles (RMNZ)	12
Poland Airplay (ZPAV)	7
Romania (Airplay 100)	71
Scotland Singles (OCC)	11
Slovakia Singles Digital (ČNS IFPI)	43
Sweden (Sverigetopplistan)	75
Switzerland (Schweizer Hitparade)	46
UK Singles (OCC)	8
UK Hip Hop/R&B (OCC)	4
US Dance Club Songs (Billboard)	6

=== Year-end charts ===
Chart (2019)	Position
Netherlands (Dutch Top 40)	80
Netherlands (Single Top 100)	89
UK Singles (OCC)	58

== Certifications ==
Region	Certification	Certified units/sales
Australia (ARIA)	Platinum	70,000^{‡}
Brazil (Pro-Música Brasil)	Platinum	40,000^{‡}
Denmark (IFPI Danmark)	Gold	45,000^{‡}
France (SNEP)	Gold	100,000^{‡}
Germany (BVMI)	Gold	200,000^{‡}
Italy (FIMI)	Gold	35,000^{‡}
New Zealand (RMNZ)	Platinum	30,000^{‡}
Poland (ZPAV)	2× Platinum	100,000^{‡}
United Kingdom (BPI)	2× Platinum	1,200,000^{‡}
^{‡} Sales+streaming figures based on certification alone.

== Release history ==
Region	Date	Format	Version(s)	Label	Ref.
Various	7 June 2019	Digital download; streaming	Original	Polydor	
Various	5 July 2019	Digital download; streaming	Remixes	Polydor	
Italy	12 July 2019	Contemporary hit radio	Original	Universal	
Various	19 July 2019	Digital download; streaming	Acoustic	Polydor	
