= Lose You (Tiësto song) =

- Chico Rose Remix cover

Song by Tiësto featuring Ilira

from the album The London Sessions
- Released: 15 May 2020
- Genre: Brazilian bass
- Length: 2:30
- Label: Musical Freedom; PM:AM; Universal
- Songwriters: Tijs Verwest; Ilira Gashi; Johannes Muller
- Producers: Tiësto; Joe Walter

"Lose You" is a song by Dutch disc jockey and producer Tiësto with vocals from Swiss-Albanian singer and songwriter Ilira. The song was included in Tiësto's fifth studio album, The London Sessions, released on 15 May 2020. It is the third brazilian bass song produced by Tiësto after "Boom" and "Grapevine".

== Track listing ==
Digital Download (from The London Sessions album)

1. "Lose You" – 2:30

Digital download – Chico Rose Remix

1. "Lose You" (Chico Rose Remix) – 2:35

== Charts ==
Chart performance for "Lose You"
Chart (2020)	Peak position
US Hot Dance/Electronic Songs (Billboard)	37

== Certifications ==
Certifications for "Lose You"
Region	Certification	Certified units/sales
Brazil (Pro-Música Brasil)	Gold	20,000^{‡}
^{‡} Sales+streaming figures based on certification alone.
