= Ritual (Tiësto, Jonas Blue and Rita Ora song) =

2019 single by Jonas Blue featuring Rita Ora And Tiësto

Single by Tiësto featuring Jonas Blue and Rita Ora

from the album The London Sessions
- Released: 31 May 2019
- Genre: Dance-pop; EDM
- Length: 3:18
- Label: Musical Freedom; PM:AM; Universal
- Songwriters: Tiësto; Jonas Blue; Fraser T. Smith; Grace Barker; Stonebank; Wayne Hector
- Producers: Tiësto; Jonas Blue; Stonebank

Tiësto singles chronology
"Grapevine" (2019)	"Ritual" (2019)	"God Is a Dancer" (2019)

Jonas Blue singles chronology
"What I Like About You" (2019)	"Ritual" (2019)	"I Wanna Dance" (2019)

Rita Ora singles chronology
"Carry On" (2019)	"Ritual" (2019)	"How to Be Lonely" (2020)

Music video
- "Ritual" on YouTube

"Ritual" is a song by Dutch DJ Tiësto featuring English DJ Jonas Blue and British singer Rita Ora from the former's sixth studio album, The London Sessions (2020). The song was penned by Tiësto, Blue, Fraser T. Smith, Grace Barker, Michael Stonebank and Wayne Hector, while produced by the DJs and Stonebank. Marking the first collaboration between the artists, it was released as the second single from the album for digital download and streaming in various countries by Musical Freedom under exclusive license to PM:AM and Universal on 31 May 2019. The love song combines elements of dance-pop and EDM, with a blend of club and tropical house beats. The lyrics evoke the sentiment of eternal love and are a dedication to couples who are limited by space and time. Upon its release, the song received a warm reception from music critics, several of whom highlighted the collaborative effort, the music of it and Ora's vocal delivery.

"Ritual" reached the number one position in Slovakia as well as the top 10 in the Commonwealth of Independent States (CIS), Croatia, the Czech Republic, Hungary, Russia, Scotland and Poland. The song also reached number 13 on the US Billboard Hot Dance/Electronic Songs, number 24 on the UK Singles Chart and number 99 on the Canadian Hot 100. It received gold certifications in four countries as well as platinum in an additional four countries, including Canada, Norway, Sweden and the United Kingdom. The song received further recognition with a diamond certification in Poland from the Polish Society of the Phonographic Industry (ZPAV). The official music video for the song was directed by Sophie Muller, and displays Ora dancing in an alternating neon light setting, was premiered on Tiësto's YouTube channel on 20 June 2019.

== Background and composition ==
A few days prior to its release, Tiësto, Jonas Blue and Rita Ora announced on their social media accounts that their upcoming single titled "Ritual" was set to be released on 31 May 2019. The song was released on the scheduled date for digital download and streaming in various countries by Musical Freedom under exclusive license to PM:AM and Universal as the second single from Tiësto's sixth studio album The London Sessions (2020). "Ritual" was penned by Tiësto (Tijs Verwest), Jonas Blue (Guy Robin), Fraser T. Smith, Grace Barker, Michael Stonebank and Wayne Hector, with the production completed by Tiësto, Jonas Blue and Stonebank. Marking the first collaboration between the artists, Tiësto stated, "Jonas Blue is such a talented artist and we have been looking for some time for the right project to collaborate on. [...] And Rita's vocals take the track to the next level!" Constructed in verse–chorus form, the song is composed in the key of E minor and time signature of common time with a tempo of 115 beats per minute. The vocal range of Ora in the song spans from a low note of B_{3} to a high note of D_{5}. With a duration time of three minutes and 18 seconds, it is a dance-pop and EDM love song. The song is built around a synth production, deep house basslines, a progressive drop as well as club and tropical house beats. The lyrics evoke the sentiment of eternal love, dedicated to couples who are limited together by space and time. In the lyrics, Ora sings: "Always love you all through the night/ Be there when the sun is rising/ Oh, you'll always be my ritual."

== Reception and promotion ==
Upon its release, "Ritual" was met with a warm reception from music critics. Farrell Sweeney from Dancing Astronaut emphasised Ora's "captivating" vocals and the song's ability to blend a "driving instrumentals [...] that's fit for club floors and radio airwaves". Thomas Bleach of The Music Network referred to the song as a "summer fuelled anthem [...] that will have listeners ready to dance". Kate Bein from Billboard also lauded the song as a "shimmering summer [...] tune to get you warmed up". James Weingand for We Rave You considered the song as a choice for those seeking "to kickstart your weekend [...] that has summer written all over it". Mike Wass of Idolator labelled the collaborative effort between the artists as "sexy" and foresaw it as "to destined rule clubs from Iceland to Ibiza". Spotify published a year-end list in 2020 which ranked the song among the best EDM songs.

Peaking at number one in the Slovakia, "Ritual" reached the top 20 in several other countries, including Belgium, the Commonwealth of Independent States (CIS), Croatia, the Czech Republic, Hungary, Ireland, Lebanon, Lithuania, the Netherlands, Russia and Scotland. Other top 60 positions were achieved in Greece, Switzerland, Sweden and Ukraine. In the United States, the song peaked at number 13 on the Hot Dance/Electronic Songs and number 37 on the Dance/Mix Show Airplay rankings. In the United Kingdom, it reached number 24 on the UK Singles Chart and received a platinum certification from the British Phonographic Industry (BPI) for shifting more than 600,000 units in the country. The song earned gold certifications in Belgium, France, Italy and Portugal as well as platinum in Canada, Norway and Sweden. It was further certified diamond by the Polish Society of the Phonographic Industry (ZPAV) for selling more than 250,000 units in Poland.

The music video for "Ritual" premiered to Tiësto's official YouTube channel on 20 June 2019. The three-minute and 17-second video made its broadcast premiere on MTV Live, MTVU and ViacomCBS Times Square billboards on 21 June. Shot in London, it was directed by Sophie Muller and choreographed by Aaron Sillis. The video showcases a series of dance performances by Ora, who is joined by a troupe of dancers in a setting that alternates between different neon lights. Ora is attired in a white cropped tank top and denim jeans by Italian fashion brand Diesel. Althea Legaspi from Rolling Stone complimented the video as having a "sultry" and "colorful" quality, and highlighted Ora's performance, commenting that "[she] hits choreographed cues with her grooving cohorts as she sings [...] about lust's lingering effects". Bein for Billboard also praised the "enchanting" dance moves and Ora's appearance, stating: "She's looking like a gap commercial star [...] it's pretty fantastic."

== Track listing ==
- Digital download and streaming
1. "Ritual" – 3:18
- Digital download and streaming
1. "Ritual" (Acoustic) – 3:24
2. "Ritual" – 3:18

== Charts ==
=== Weekly charts ===
Weekly chart performance for "Ritual"
Chart (2019)	Peak position
Belgium (Ultratop 50 Flanders)	10
Belgium (Ultratop 50 Wallonia)	19
Canada Hot 100 (Billboard)	99
CIS Airplay (TopHit)	2
Croatia International Airplay (Top lista)	3
Czech Republic Airplay (ČNS IFPI)	3
Czech Republic Singles Digital (ČNS IFPI)	50
Estonia (Eesti Tipp-40)	19
Euro Digital Song Sales (Billboard)	11
France (SNEP)	117
Greece International (IFPI)	33
Hungary (Rádiós Top 40)	2
Hungary (Dance Top 40)	26
Hungary (Single Top 40)	9
Hungary (Stream Top 40)	24
Ireland (IRMA)	13
Lebanon (Lebanese Top 20)	17
Lithuania (AGATA)	10
Mexico Airplay (Billboard)	37
Netherlands (Dutch Top 40)	5
Netherlands (Single Top 100)	11
New Zealand Hot Singles (RMNZ)	10
Poland Airplay (ZPAV)	6
Russia Airplay (TopHit)	3
Scottish Singles Sales (Official Charts)	3
Slovakia Airplay (ČNS IFPI)	1
Slovakia Singles Digital (ČNS IFPI)	29
Sweden (Sverigetopplistan)	24
Switzerland (Schweizer Hitparade)	56
UK Singles (Official Charts)	24
Ukraine Airplay (TopHit)	29
US Hot Dance/Electronic Songs (Billboard)	13

2026 weekly chart performance
Chart (2026)	Peak position
Lithuania Airplay (TopHit)	86

=== Monthly charts ===
Monthly chart performance for "Ritual"
Chart (2019)	Peak position
CIS (Tophit)	3
Russia Airplay (Tophit)	3
Ukraine Airplay (Tophit)	71

=== Year-end charts ===
2019 year-end chart performance for "Ritual"
Chart (2019)	Position
Belgium (Ultratop Flanders)	32
Belgium (Ultratop Wallonia)	76
CIS (Tophit)	45
Hungary (Single Top 100)	53
Hungary (Stream Top 100)	97
Netherlands (Dutch Top 40)	11
Netherlands (Single Top 100)	29
Poland (Polish Airplay Top 100)	65
Russia Airplay (Tophit)	42
US Hot Dance/Electronic Songs (Billboard)	40

2020 year-end chart performance for "Ritual"
Chart (2020)	Position
CIS (Tophit)	80
Hungary (Dance Top 100)	81
Hungary (Rádiós Top 100)	8
Russia Airplay (Tophit)	80

2024 year-end chart performance for "Ritual"
Chart (2024)	Position
Lithuania Airplay (TopHit)	136

2025 year-end chart performance for "Ritual"
Chart (2025)	Position
Lithuania Airplay (TopHit)	150

== Certifications ==
Certifications and sales for "Ritual"
Region	Certification	Certified units/sales
Belgium (BRMA)	Gold	20,000^{‡}
Brazil (Pro-Música Brasil)	3× Platinum	120,000^{‡}
Canada (Music Canada)	Platinum	80,000^{‡}
Denmark (IFPI Danmark)	Gold	45,000^{‡}
France (SNEP)	Gold	100,000^{‡}
Italy (FIMI)	Gold	25,000^{‡}
New Zealand (RMNZ)	Gold	15,000^{‡}
Norway (IFPI Norway)	Platinum	60,000^{‡}
Poland (ZPAV)	Diamond	250,000^{‡}
Portugal (AFP)	Gold	5,000^{‡}
Spain (Promusicae)	Platinum	60,000^{‡}
United Kingdom (BPI)	Platinum	600,000^{‡}
Streaming
Sweden (GLF)	Platinum	8,000,000^{†}
^{‡} Sales+streaming figures based on certification alone.^{†} Streaming-only figures based on certification alone.

== Release history ==
Release dates and formats for "Ritual"
Region	Date	Format(s)	Label(s)	Ref.
Various	31 May 2019	Digital download; streaming	Musical Freedom; PM:AM; Universal	
United Kingdom	31 May 2019	Various	Musical Freedom; PM:AM; Universal	
Italy	14 June 2019	Radio airplay	Universal	
