= Zumba Fitness: World Party =

2013 video game

- Developer: Zoë Mode
- Publisher: Majesco Hamster^{JP}
- Engine: In House
- Platforms: Wii, Wii U, Xbox 360, Xbox One
- Release: Wii, Wii U, Xbox 360: NA: 5 November 2013; EU: 22 November 2013; JP: 23 October 2014 (Wii U); Xbox One: NA: 22 November 2013; EU: 22 November 2013; JP: 4 September 2014 (XONE)
- Genre: Exergaming
- Modes: Single-player, multiplayer

Zumba Fitness: World Party (a.k.a. Zumba Fitness 4) is the fourth video game in the installment of the Fitness series, with this game being the sequel to Zumba Fitness Core (2012). This game is based on the Zumba program as it was then later followed by Zumba Kids (2013). The game was developed by Zoë Mode and published by Majesco. It was released for Xbox 360, Wii U, Wii, and Xbox One consoles in November 2013.

== Gameplay ==
There are 45 pre-set classes as well as customizable workouts. Players can learn different dance styles, including salsa, hip-hop, Tahitian, calypso, Bollywood, cumbia, reggaeton and Irish step. The world tour mode allows players to unlock songs from seven global destinations.

The "Progress Tracker Plus" tallies all of a player's statistics, including technique score, calories burned and goals met. Players can set personal fitness goals or work towards pre-set goals to unlock bonus rewards. Motivational rewards include behind-the-scenes videos, passport stamps, postcards, souvenirs, fitness tips and achievements. Low-, medium- and high-intensity routines are available, along with expanded tutorials.

Two-player support is available on Xbox One and Kinect for Xbox 360. Four-player support is available on Wii U and Wii.

== Soundtrack ==
Over 40 songs, both Zumba originals and licensed tracks, will be featured in the soundtrack.

Song	Artist	Year	Duration
"1865 (96 Degrees in the Shade)"	Sean Na'auao	1977	
"Aguanilé"	Marc Anthony	2007	
"Bailando Por Ahí"	Juan Magán featuring Pitbull	2011	
"Batucada Dance"	The Samba Brazilian Batucada Band	2012	1:45
"Beam Me Up"	Cazzette	2012	
"Born This Way"	Lady Gaga	2011	
"Boro Boro"	Arash	2004	3:05
"Came Here To Party"	Dahrio Wonder	2013	2:45
"Caribbean Dream"	Honorebel	2013	
"Carmen" (XO)	Ryan Franks	2013	
"Clarity"	Zedd featuring Foxes	2013	
"Coisa Brasileira"	Zumba Original	2012	
"Corazoncito Bonito"	Zumba Original	2013	
"DJ Dale Play" (XO)	Mara	2013	
"Do You Feel Like Movin'"	Mohombi featuring Baby, KMC & Casey	2013	2:55
"Echa Pa'lla (Manos Pa'rriba)"	Pitbull featuring Papayo	2012	
"Exotic"	Priyanka featuring Pitbull	2013	
"Garota Nacional"	Skank	1997	
"Haleiwa Hula"	Sean Na'auao		
"Jungle"	Last Voices	2009	2:22
"Indian Moonshine"	Zumba Original	2012	2:46
"Kaim Rahe Sadari"	Epic Bhangra	2011	2:57
"Limbo"	Daddy Yankee	2012	
"Loco"	Zumba Original	2012	
"Maoli Girl"	O-Shen	2005	
"Marioneta"	Zumba Original	2013	
"Mas que Nada"	The Bahia Band	1963	2:48
"Mashallah"	Shreya Ghoshal featuring Wajid	2012	
"Na Ponta Do Pe"	Zumba Original	2010	
"Next to Me"	Emeli Sandé	2012	
"Otea Tamatoa" (XO)	Tamatoa World	2013	
"Pega Pega"	Armando Salcedo and Heidy Torres	2013	
"Perros Salvajes"	Daddy Yankee	2012	3:00
"Put The Gun Down"	ZZ Ward	2012	2:48
"Puttin' on the Ritz"	Herb Alpert and Lani Hall	2013	2:52
"Ruas Encantadas"	Claudia Leitte	2012	2:48
"Russian Dances"	Samovar Russian Dance Ensemble	2000	2:31
"Shake Your Hips"	Joan Osborne	2012	2:48
"Shant" (XO)	Zumba Original	2013	
"The Beggarman Jig"	The High Kings	2008	1:42
"True To Myself"	Ziggy Marley	2007	
"Una De Salao"	Salao	1999	2:55
"Vibes"	Queen Ifrica featuring Shaggy	2011	
"Zumba Boricua"	Rafa Maya	2013	2:50

- A "(XO)" indicates that the song is an Xbox One exclusive.

== Reception ==
Reception

Review scores
Publication	Score
Hardcore Gamer	4/5
IGN	7.2/10

- Steve Hannley of Hardcore Gamer gave the game a 4/5, calling it "the most polished iteration yet."
- Brian Albert of IGN gave the game a 7.2/10, saying "Zumba Fitness: World Party: isn't great at bringing in new people, but the dance workouts are fun regardless of skill.
