= Jackie Chan (song) =

2018 single by Tiësto and Dzeko featuring Preme and Post Malone

Single by Tiësto and Dzeko featuring Preme and Post Malone

from the album The London Sessions
- Released: 18 May 2018
- Length: 3:35
- Label: Musical Freedom; PM:AM; Universal
- Songwriters: Tijs Verwest; Julian Dzeko; Raynford Humphrey; Austin Post; Louis Bell; Luis Raposo Torres
- Producers: Tiësto; Preme; Julian Dzeko; Wallis Lane; Luis Raposo Torres

Tiësto singles chronology
"Carry You Home" (2017)	"Jackie Chan" (2018)	"Grapevine" (2018)

Dzeko singles chronology
"Blue" (2018)	"Jackie Chan" (2018)	"Try Not to Love You" (2018)

Preme singles chronology
"Hot Boy" (2018)	"Jackie Chan" (2018)	"Alright" (2019)

Post Malone singles chronology
"Ball for Me" (2018)	"Jackie Chan" (2018)	"Better Now" (2018)

Music video
- "Jackie Chan" on YouTube

"Jackie Chan" is a song by Canadian rapper Preme featuring American musician Post Malone. The track was originally featured on the former's debut full-length album, Light of Day, released on May 4, 2018. Upon hearing the vocal in the studio, Dutch DJ Tiësto and Canadian DJ Dzeko decided to produce an alternate version with crossover club appeal, for release as a single.

The dance version is credited as Tiësto and Dzeko featuring Preme and Post Malone. The single was released through Musical Freedom on 18 May 2018. It was written by all of the song's performers together with Louis Bell and Luis Raposo Torres. The song's title is a reference to the Hong Kong martial artist of the same name. It was eventually included on Tiësto's sixth studio album, The London Sessions (2020).

Following its release as a single, "Jackie Chan" peaked at number 52 on the US Billboard Hot 100, and number one on US Billboard Dance/Mix Show Airplay chart (Tiësto's third, and the first apiece for Dzeko, Preme, and Malone). It also peaked within the top ten of the charts in several countries, including Belgium (Wallonia), Canada, Czech Republic, Denmark, Finland, Ireland, Latvia, the Netherlands, New Zealand, Poland and the United Kingdom as well as the top twenty of the charts in Australia, Austria, Belgium (Flanders), Italy, Norway, Portugal and Sweden.

== Song structure ==
The song starts out with an electric guitar intro, leading up to Post Malone's first few lines. The beat adds in and Preme starts rapping. It then alternates between the two until a rise starts (at 1:14) and then Post Malone sings the phrase "now your bitch wanna kick it, Jackie Chan". This then leads to the so-called "EDM" part of the song comes in (1:19) where Post Malone and Preme both stop rapping. They start rapping 12 seconds after. The same process repeats except for the fact that the lyrics have shifted slightly.

== Music video ==
A lyric video for "Jackie Chan" was released on YouTube on 18 May 2018. It was directed by Katia Temkin. The official music video for "Jackie Chan" was released on Tiësto's YouTube channel on 2 July 2018. It features Minecraft-themed animated versions of Post Malone and Preme having fun around a futuristic city, driving in a limousine. The music video was directed by Jay Martin.

== Critical reception ==
Kat Bein of Billboard described the song as "a summer-ready anthem with a couple of cool breeze features from the singing MCs", calling it "a delightful slice of pop crossover for both the hip-hop and electronic dance entertainers".

== Charts ==
=== Weekly charts ===
Chart (2018–2019)	Peak position
Australia (ARIA)	13
Austria (Ö3 Austria Top 40)	19
Belgium (Ultratop 50 Flanders)	13
Belgium (Ultratop 50 Wallonia)	5
Canada Hot 100 (Billboard)	7
Canada AC (Billboard)	37
Canada CHR/Top 40 (Billboard)	4
Canada Hot AC (Billboard)	30
Colombia (National-Report)	50
Croatia (HRT)	18
CIS Airplay (TopHit)	28
Czech Republic Airplay (ČNS IFPI)	45
Czech Republic Singles Digital (ČNS IFPI)	5
Denmark (Tracklisten)	6
Estonia (Eesti Tipp-40)	3
Finland (Suomen virallinen lista)	10
France (SNEP)	46
Germany (GfK)	25
Greece (IFPI)	11
Hungary (Dance Top 40)	15
Hungary (Rádiós Top 40)	5
Hungary (Single Top 40)	24
Hungary (Stream Top 40)	8
Iceland (Tónlistinn)	29
Ireland (IRMA)	6
Italy (FIMI)	18
Italy Airplay (EarOne)	1
Latvia (LAIPA)	3
Lebanon (OLT20)	8
Lithuania (AGATA)	36
Mexico Airplay (Billboard)	24
Netherlands (Dutch Top 40)	2
Netherlands (Single Top 100)	7
New Zealand (Recorded Music NZ)	7
Norway (VG-lista)	13
Poland Airplay (ZPAV)	3
Poland Dance (ZPAV)	13
Portugal (AFP)	18
Romania (Airplay 100)	53
Russia Airplay (TopHit)	15
Scotland Singles (Official Charts)	7
Slovakia Airplay (ČNS IFPI)	58
Slovakia Singles Digital (ČNS IFPI)	5
Slovenia (SloTop50)	8
Spain (Promusicae)	62
Sweden (Sverigetopplistan)	20
Switzerland (Schweizer Hitparade)	27
UK Singles (Official Charts)	5
US Billboard Hot 100	52
US Dance Club Songs (Billboard)	24
US Hot Dance/Electronic Songs (Billboard)	3
US Pop Airplay (Billboard)	15
US Rhythmic Airplay (Billboard)	17
Venezuela (National-Report)	82

=== Year-end charts ===
Chart (2018)	Position
Australia (ARIA)	64
Austria (Ö3 Austria Top 40)	56
Belgium (Ultratop Flanders)	46
Belgium (Ultratop Wallonia)	52
Canada (Canadian Hot 100)	31
Denmark (Tracklisten)	37
Hungary (Dance Top 40)	67
Hungary (Rádiós Top 40)	55
Iceland (Plötutíóindi)	34
Italy (FIMI)	62
Netherlands (Dutch Top 40)	19
Netherlands (Single Top 100)	30
Poland (ZPAV)	41
Portugal (AFP)	73
Sweden (Sverigetopplistan)	77
Switzerland (Schweizer Hitparade)	85
UK Singles (Official Charts Company)	63
US Hot Dance/Electronic Songs (Billboard)	8
Chart (2019)	Position
Hungary (Dance Top 40)	45
Hungary (Rádiós Top 40)	56
US Hot Dance/Electronic Songs (Billboard)	34

=== Decade-end charts ===
Chart (2010–2019)	Position
US Hot Dance/Electronic Songs (Billboard)	41

== Certifications ==
Region	Certification	Certified units/sales
Australia (ARIA)	Platinum	70,000^{‡}
Austria (IFPI Austria)	Gold	15,000^{‡}
Belgium (BRMA)	Gold	20,000^{‡}
Brazil (Pro-Música Brasil)	Diamond	160,000^{‡}
Canada (Music Canada)	7× Platinum	560,000^{‡}
Denmark (IFPI Danmark)	Platinum	90,000^{‡}
France (SNEP)	Platinum	200,000^{‡}
Germany (BVMI)	Gold	200,000^{‡}
Italy (FIMI)	2× Platinum	100,000^{‡}
Mexico (AMPROFON)	Platinum	60,000^{‡}
New Zealand (RMNZ)	3× Platinum	90,000^{‡}
Norway (IFPI Norway)	Platinum	60,000^{‡}
Poland (ZPAV)	3× Platinum	150,000^{‡}
Portugal (AFP)	Gold	5,000^{‡}
Spain (Promusicae)	Gold	30,000^{‡}
United Kingdom (BPI)	2× Platinum	1,200,000^{‡}
United States (RIAA)	2× Platinum	2,000,000^{‡}
Streaming
Sweden (GLF)	2× Platinum	16,000,000^{†}
^{‡} Sales+streaming figures based on certification alone.^{†} Streaming-only figures based on certification alone.

== Release history ==
Region	Date	Format	Version	Label	Ref.
United States	18 May 2018	Digital download; streaming	Original	Musical Freedom	
Italy	25 May 2018	Contemporary hit radio	Original	Universal	
United States	19 June 2018	Contemporary hit radio	Original	Casablanca; Republic	
United Kingdom	27 June 2018	Contemporary hit radio	Original	Casablanca; Republic	
United States	28 August 2018	Rhythmic contemporary radio	Original	Republic	
Various	31 August 2018	Digital download; streaming	Remixes Vol.1 EP	Musical Freedom	
Various	5 October 2018	Digital download; streaming	Remixes Vol.2 EP	Musical Freedom	
Various	19 October 2019	Digital download; streaming	Laidback Luke remix	Musical Freedom	
