= Electric Magma =

- Origin: Toronto, Ontario, Canada
- Genres: rock
- Years active: 2001–present
- Labels: Around Ahead Music
- Members: Tryg Smith; Tim Reesor; Tom Brouard

Electric Magma is an instrumental heavy riff rock band from Toronto, Ontario, Canada. Electric Magma was formed between 2000 and 2001 by Tryg Smith, Tim Reesor and Tom Brouard. Influenced by the stoner rock movement from the mid-1990s (Fu Manchu, Kyuss, Clutch, Corrosion of Conformity), Electric Magma is known for their improvised style of riff-based rock music.

Electric Magma has released seven full-length albums. All of Electric Magma's albums have been released by Around Ahead Music, the band's record label.

Electric Magma's 2005 release: Snail the Wah was self-recorded In Justin Koop's (B-Town Sound) original farmhouse studio over the course of a blurry week. The concept of this release was to be a double LP. Disc 1 containing songs written over the previous year, with Disc 2 being improvised in the studio live off the floor. The band has LP artwork and masters ready to go, but have never actually released it on Vinyl. The album cover features the artwork of longtime friend Chris Moniz, who painted the cover with Oil on Canvas.

Electric Magma's 2012 release: Canadian Samurai II was mixed in California by Scott Reeder of Kyuss. The album cover features the artwork of Ken Kelly, who also painted the covers of the Kiss albums Destroyer and Love Gun.

Electric Magma's 7th full-length album SILVERBALL, was recorded in January 2015 in Toronto Ontario and was produced and mixed by Ian Blurton. The album was released in July 2015 on vinyl. The album cover features an original oil painting by Robb Waters.

In the winter of 2017, the band started writing music for their 8th studio album. Four songs have been completed including: "Whatever Happened to the Bitchin Camaros", "El Camino", "Dutch Oven", and "Diablo Red".

== Line-up ==
=== Present ===
- Tryg Smith - Bass (2000–Present)
- Tim Reesor - Guitar (2000–Present)
- Tom Brouard - Drums (2001–2011, 2017–present)

=== Past ===
- Mario Lunardo - Drums (2011–2012)
- Emilio Mammone - Drums (2012–2013)
- Neil Lukewich-Pheaton - Drums (2014–2015)
- Jesse Mackowycz - Drums (2017–2018)
- Jesse Labelle - Vocals (2003 studio recording self-titled album)

== Discography ==
- 2003 - Self-Titled
- 2004 - Karaoke Bitchslap (first instrumental album)
- 2005 - Snail the Wah
- 2007 - Coconut Bangers Ball
- 2009 - Mud Shovel
- 2012 - Canadian Samurai II
- 2015 - Silverball
