= Ilira =

Swiss singer and songwriter (born 1994)

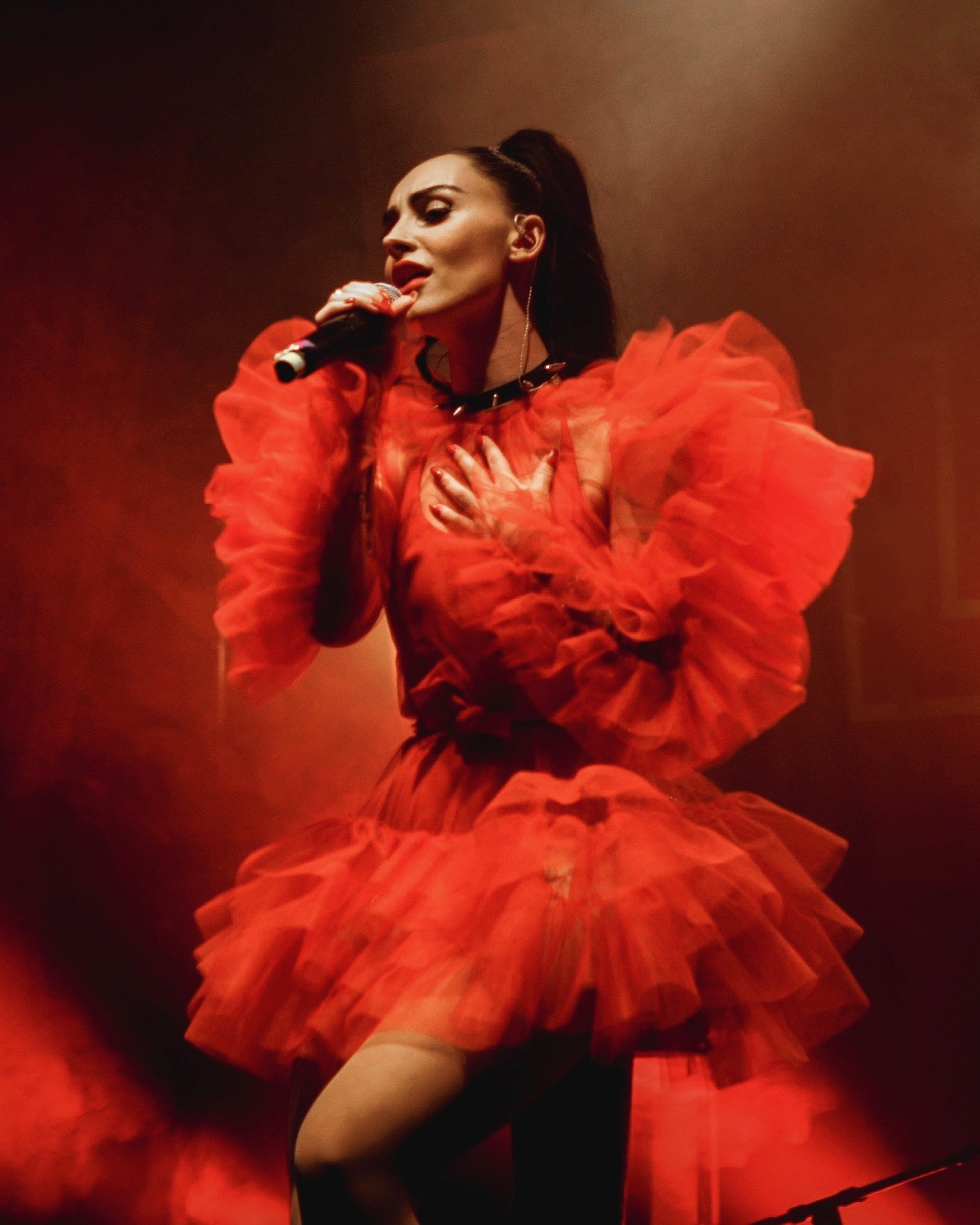
- Ilira in 2019

Background information
- Born: Ilira Gashi; 29 October 1994 (age 31); Brienz, Bern, Switzerland
- Genres: Pop
- Occupations: Singer; songwriter
- Years active: 2011, 2017–present
- Labels: Four Music, Virgin Records, Universal Music Group

Ilira Gashi (born 29 October 1994), known professionally as just Ilira, (stylized in all caps) is a Swiss singer and songwriter. In 2018, she signed to Four Music and released her debut single "Whisper My Name".

== Early life ==
Ilira Gashi was born on 29 October 1994 in Brienz, Switzerland, to father Ismet and mother Entela Gashi, the former a Kosovo Albanian from Pristina and the latter an Albanian from Tirana. She uploaded videos of herself singing on Instagram, which led to a record label deal.

== Career ==
Ilira later moved to Berlin, Germany and signed a management and publishing deal with Sony/ATV Music Publishing. In 2018, Ilira signed a label deal with Four Music, and released her debut track "Whisper My Name" on 24 August 2018, followed by her second single "Get Off My D!ck" that same year which entered the Spotify Viral Top 50 in the U.S. Her first chart placement was achieved together with Alle Farben and the song "Fading", which reached number 16 on the German Single Charts and number 1 on the German Airplay Charts for four consecutive weeks.

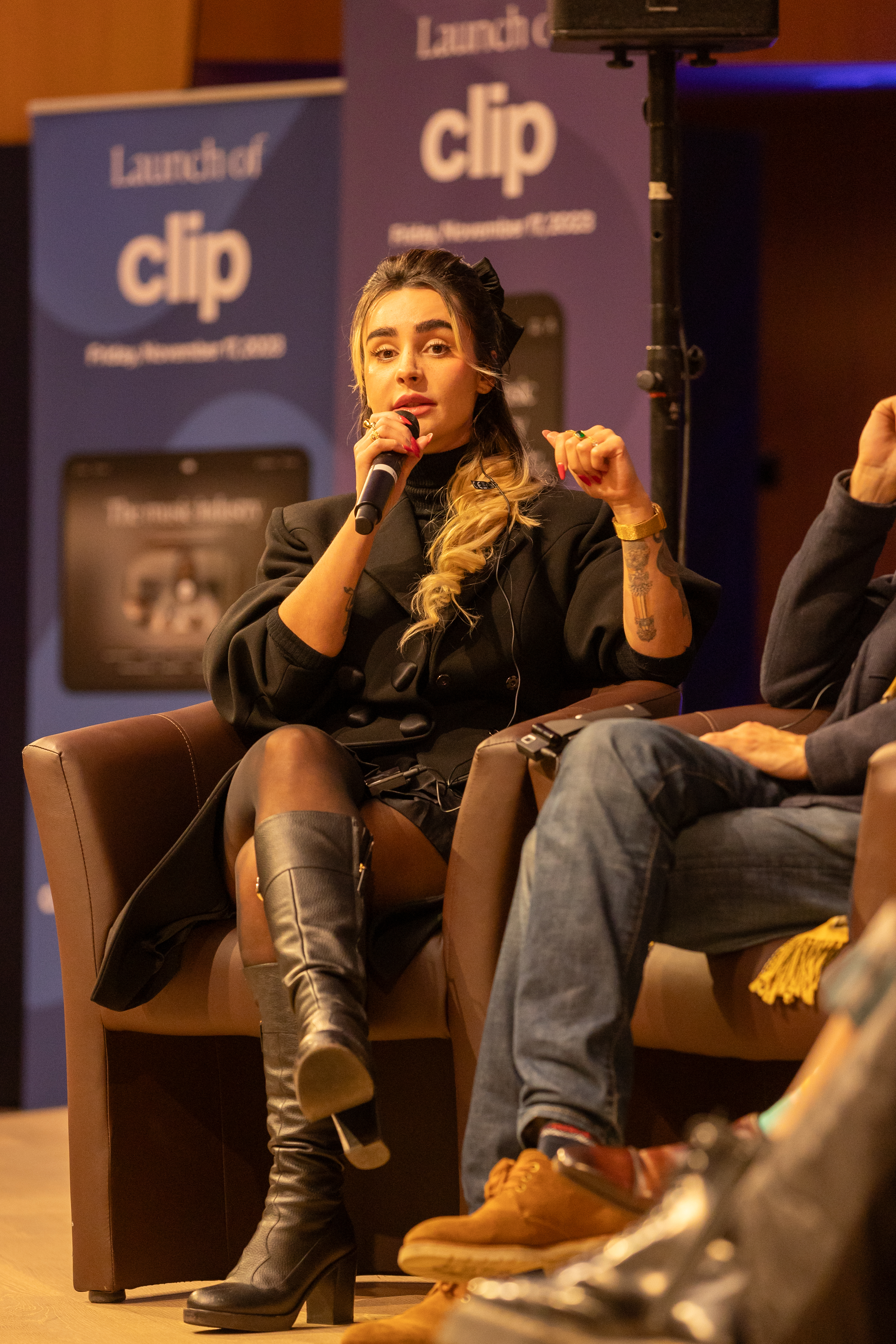
Ilira talking about Intellectual Property in Geneva in 2023

In 2019, Ilira released four singles, "Do It Yourself", "Diablo" (with Spanish producer and recording artist Juan Magán), "Pay Me Back!", and "Extra Fr!es".

In 2020, she released the singles "Royalty", "Fuck It, I Love It!", "Ladida (My Heart Goes Boom)" (together with Crispie), "Easy", and "Eat My Brain".

On 14 December 2021 Ilira announced that she had signed a joint deal with Virgin Records and Universal Music Group. She released the single "Flowers" on 17 December 2021 as her first solo single of 2021, and her first single under Virgin Records. In 2022, she released the single "Another Heart".

In 2023, she released three non-album singles followed by her six-track debut EP Never Really The End. In late 2024, she independently released the single, "Floating with the sharks".

== Discography ==
=== Extended plays ===
List of extended plays, with release date and label shown
| Title | Details |
|---|---|
| Never Really The End | Released: November 24, 2023; Label: Virgin Records; Format: Digital download |

=== Singles ===
==== As lead artist ====
| Title | Year | Peak chart positions | | | | | | | | | | | | Certifications | Album |
| Title | Year | SWI | AUT | BEL (Wa) | CIS | CZR | FRA | GER | HUN | POL | RUS | SVK | UKR | Certifications | Album |
|---|---|---|---|---|---|---|---|---|---|---|---|---|---|---|---|
| "Whisper My Name" | 2018 | — | — | — | — | — | — | — | — | — | — | — | — | | Non-album singles |
| "Fading" (with Alle Farben) | 2018 | 17 | 16 | — (Note: "Fading" did not reach the region's Ultratop 50 chart, but charted on the Ultratip Bubbling Under ranking.) | 61 | 1 | — | 16 | 1 | 2 | 74 | 2 | 6 | IFPI AUT: Gold; IFPI SWI: Platinum; ZPAV: 2× Platinum | Sticker on My Suitcase |
| "Get Off My D!ck" | 2018 | — | — | — | — | — | — | — | — | 47 | — | — | — | | Non-album singles |
| "Do It Yourself" | 2019 | — | — | — | — | — | — | — | — | — | — | — | — | | Non-album singles |
| "Diablo" (with Juan Magán) | 2019 | — | — | — | — | — | — | — | — | — | — | — | — | | Non-album singles |
| "Pay Me Back!" | 2019 | — | — | — | — | — | — | — | — | 64 | — | — | — | | Non-album singles |
| "Extra Fr!es" | 2019 | — | — | — | — | — | — | — | — | — | — | — | — | | Non-album singles |
| "Royalty" | 2020 | — | — | — | — | — | — | — | 9 | — | — | — | — | | Non-album singles |
| "Fuck It, I Love It!" | 2020 | — | — | — | — | — | — | — | — | — | — | — | — | | Non-album singles |
| "Ladida (My Heart Goes Boom)" (with Crispie) | 2020 | — | — | 33 | 244 | — | 156 | — | 18 | 5 | — | — | — | | Non-album singles |
| "Easy" | 2020 | — | — | — | — | — | — | — | — | — | — | — | — | | Non-album singles |
| "Happiness" (with Moguai and Tomcraft) | 2020 | — | — | — | 519 | — | — | — | 1 | — | — | — | — | | Non-album singles |
| "Eat My Brain" | 2020 | — | — | — | — | — | — | — | — | — | — | — | — | | Non-album singles |
| "Anytime" (with Phil The Beat) | 2021 | — | — | — | — | — | — | — | — | — | — | — | — | | Non-album singles |
| "See You in Tears" (with Amber Van Day) | 2021 | — | — | — | — | — | — | — | — | — | — | — | — | | Non-album singles |
| "Dynamite" (with Vize) | 2021 | — | 71 | — | — | — | — | 72 | — | — | — | — | — | IFPI AUT: Gold | Non-album singles |
| "Can't Get You Out of My Head" (with Crispie) | 2021 | — | — | — | — | — | — | — | — | — | — | — | — | | Non-album singles |
| "Flowers" | 2021 | — | — | — | — | — | — | — | — | — | — | — | — | | TBA |
| "Alien" (with Galantis and Lucas & Steve) | 2021 | — | — | — | 4 | — | — | — | — | 10 | 1 | — | — | ZPAV: Gold | Non-album singles |
| "Another Heart" | 2022 | — | — | — | — | — | — | — | — | — | — | — | — | | Non-album singles |
| "Clean Break" | 2022 | — | — | — | — | — | — | — | — | — | — | — | — | | Non-album singles |
| "Time After Time"(with Pascal Letoublon) | 2023 | — | — | — | — | — | — | — | — | — | — | — | — | | Non-album singles |
| "Rich In Love"(with Super-Hi) | 2023 | — | — | — | — | — | — | — | — | — | — | — | — | | Non-album singles |
| "Be My Light"(with Stress) | 2023 | — | — | — | — | — | — | — | — | — | — | — | — | | Non-album singles |
| "Floating with the sharks" | 2024 | — | — | — | — | — | — | — | — | — | — | — | — | | Non-album singles |
"—" denotes a recording that did not chart or was not released in that territory.

=== As featured artist ===
| Title | Year | Peak chart positions | | | Album |
| Title | Year | US Dance | US Dance Dig. | US Dance/Mix | Album |
|---|---|---|---|---|---|
| "Stay High" (Jumpa and Bad Paris featuring Ilira) | 2016 | — | — | — | Non-album singles |
| "Wasted" (Jumpa featuring Ilira) | 2017 | — | — | — | Non-album singles |
| "Afterglow" (Jumpa featuring Ilira) | 2017 | — | — | — | Non-album singles |
| "Lost Without You" (James Carter featuring Ilira) | 2017 | — | — | — | Non-album singles |
| "Ain't Growing Up" (Jumpa featuring Ilira) | 2017 | — | — | — | Non-album singles |
| "Level Up" (Jumpa featuring Ilira) | 2018 | — | — | — | Non-album singles |
| "Growing Up" (Funcc. and Tee Peters featuring Ilira and Epifania) | 2019 | — | — | — | Non-album singles |
| "Lose You" (Tiësto featuring Ilira) | 2020 | 37 | 17 | 2 | The London Sessions |
| "Are You OK?" (Yves V and Dubdogz featuring Ilira) | 2021 | — | — | — | Non-album single |
| "Infinity" (Wilkinson featuring Ilira, Iiola and Tom Cane) | 2023 | — | — | — | TBA |
"—" denotes a recording that did not chart or was not released.

== Awards and nominations ==
| Year | Award | Nomination | Work | Result | Ref. |
|---|---|---|---|---|---|
| 2019 | MTV Europe Music Awards | Best Swiss Act | Herself | Nominated | |
| 2019 | New Faces Awards | Music | Herself | Won | |
