= Jesse Labelle =

Canadian singer

- Born: 12 February 1982 (age 44); Toronto, Ontario, Canada
- Genres: Country
- Occupations: Singer-songwriter, musician
- Instruments: Vocals, Guitar, Mandolin, Piano, Banjo
- Years active: 2001–present
- Website: jesselabelle.komi.io

Jesse Labelle is a Country and Christian singer-songwriter. With a career spanning decades and genres, he has been the recipient of both Gold and Platinum records, and various Radio Music Awards. Jesse is currently engaged to fellow artist Brieanna James as of September 19th, 2025

In June 2008, Labelle signed to Wax Records and began working on his debut album, Perfect Accident, which would be released April 27, 2010. His second album, Two, was released August 7, 2013. He is best known for his singles "Easier", "Heartbreak Coverup", and "One Last Night".

In 2015, Jesse moved to Nashville, Tennessee, and become a staple and a songwriting force in Music City. He has opened for Garth Brooks on his 2019 stadium tour, and been the only independent artist ever invited to play the main stage at the Stagecoach Festival, the largest and most prestigious country music festival in the world.

After a car accident, tornado, cancer, and a violent shooting which left Jesse wounded, his story of finding God has taken his life's path in a new direction, which can be reflected and heard in his music.

== Early life ==
Born February 12, 1982, in Toronto, Ontario, Labelle first learned the guitar in his pre-teens, and played in a number of rock bands throughout high school. After graduation, Labelle discovered he had a knack for "picking apart songs" and began pursuing a career as a songwriter.

Through the next couple of years, he wrote for local bands in Toronto, New York City, and Nashville as well as penning material for himself. A performance on Citytv's Speaker's Corner programme caught the attention of up-and-coming singer Fefe Dobson, who invited Labelle to write with her and perform in her band.

None of these collaborations made it onto any of Dobson's studio albums, however this experience did bring Labelle into contact with songwriter/producer Jay Levine and ultimately led to a development deal with Arista Records. Sometime in the mid-2000s, talent scouts for Wax Records attended a showcase of Labelle's at a Toronto café, resulting in Labelle signing with the label in 2009.

=== 2001–2002 : Identically Different (I.D) ===
Identically Different, simply known as I.D, was a Canadian boyband that reached mild popularity in Canada throughout 2001. They released their self-titled debut album the same year with the lead single, "Busted" followed by "Let's Play" which both gained popularity on YTV's Hitlist and local FM radio stations. They split in 2002, as the boy band craze faded. Jesse Labelle was a member of the group alongside Gary Laranja, Joe Abbruscato, Mark Ghezzo and Darryl Snider. They never released another album.

=== 2003 : Electric Magma ===
Labelle was the lead vocalist in Canadian rock band Electric Magma and appeared on one album (debut self-titled). By the end of 2003 Labelle left Electric Magma.

=== 2014–present : Nashville ===
Labelle was released from his recording commitments to Wax Records citing creative differences. Labelle had been pushing to move his musical vision south to Nashville to explore the town that he had made a second home over the years.

Jesse fell into a writing circle with Casey Marshall, who had been responsible for the career development and songwriting for Tim Hicks, Three Days Grace, and My Darkest Days. Casey introduced Jesse to Neil Sanderson of Three Days Grace and the three began writing in Nashville.

The resulting material from sessions with various co-writers including Craig Wiseman, Chris Wallin, and Phil Barton, served as Jesses third commercial release, currently titled EP which was released in 2015.

== Tours ==
Labelle participated in MuchMusic's 2010 SodaPop Tour alongside Emily Osment and labelmate Alyssa Reid. In 2012, Labelle toured the United Kingdom with Reid, and also opened for Jordan Knight (of NKOTB) on the Canadian leg of Knight's "Live and Unfinished" Tour. In July 2014, Jesse joined Keith Urban on Canadian dates of his Raise 'Em Up Tour including the memorable performance at the Scotiabank Saddledome during the Calgary Stampede. In the summer of 2015, Jesse appeared at the Boots & Hearts Music Festival in Ontario.

== Discography ==
=== Studio albums ===
I.D (Identically Different)

Title	Year
Identically Different	Released: March 19, 2002; Label: Groove Music Canada; Format: CD

Electric Magma

Title	Year
self-titled	Released: 2003; Label: Around Ahead Music; Format: CD

Solo artist

Title	Year
Perfect Accident	Released: April 27, 2010; Label: Wax Records; Format: CD, digital download
Two	Released: August 7, 2012; Re-issued: February 12, 2013; Label: Wax Records; Format: CD, digital download

=== Extended plays ===
Title	Year
Perfect Accident	Released: November 10, 2009; Label: Wax Records; Format: CD, digital download

=== Singles ===
Year	Title	Peak chart positions				Certifications	Album
Year	Title	CAN	CAN AC	CAN CHR	CAN HAC	Certifications	Album
2009	"Perfect Accident"	—	—	—	—		Perfect Accident
2010	"Easier"	—	8	—	42		Perfect Accident
2010	"Last Christmas"	—	6	—	—		Non-album single
2011	"Lost"	—	—	—	—		Perfect Accident
2012	"Heartbreak Coverup" (featuring Alyssa Reid)	46	13	44	12	MC : Gold	Two
2012	"One Last Night" (featuring Nixon)	83	17	—	33		Two
2013	"How Long"	—	—	—	—		Two
2013	"Tell the World"	—	28	—	—		Two
2015	"You Left Me"	—	—	—	—		Non-album singles
2017	"Another You"	—	—	—	—		Non-album singles
"—" denotes a title that did not chart.

== Awards ==
Award	Year	Nominee/Work	Category	Result
Canadian Radio Music Awards	2013	"Heartbreak Coverup"	Best New Group or Solo Artist: Hot AC	Won
International Acoustic Music Awards	2019	"Two Hearts And A Diamond"	Best Male Artist	Won
