= Preme =

Canadian rapper from Montreal

- Also known as: P Reign; The Canadian Dream; The King of Da North
- Born: Raynford Avery Humphrey; January 8, 1986 (age 40); Montreal, Quebec, Canada
- Origin: Toronto, Ontario, Canada
- Genres: Canadian hip hop
- Occupations: Rapper; singer; songwriter; record producer
- Years active: 2008–present
- Labels: Reps Up; Empire; Columbia; Blueprint Group; RCA
- Children: 2

Raynford Avery Humphrey (born January 8, 1986), better known by his stage name Preme (/priːm/ PREEM; formerly P Reign), is a Canadian rapper, singer, songwriter, and record producer. He initially guest appeared on the 2011 singles "Alone Again" by Alyssa Reid and "Invincible" by Hedley. The songs peaked at numbers 11 and nine on the Canadian Hot 100, respectively. He signed with RCA Records to release his debut extended play Dear Summer EP (2014), which contained the singles "DnF" (featuring Drake and Future), "Chickens" (featuring Waka Flocka Flame) and "We Them Niggas" (featuring ASAP Rocky).

In 2018, he rebranded in favor of the stage name Preme, subsequently launching his own label Reps Ups Entertainment in a joint-venture with Columbia Records. That same year, his song "Jackie Chan" (featuring Post Malone) became a minor hit and spawned a remix by Tiësto and Dzeko; this version marked his first entry on the Billboard Hot 100.

== Career ==
Preme is of Guyanese descent. He released his debut solo single, "You Know I'm Fly", in 2008; it topped the PunchMuch Canadian interactive music channel. His follow-up singles, "Money in My Pocket" (2009) and "In My Hood" (2010), were both produced by T-Minus. His stage name of Preme is due to his preterm birth; Preme is a changed spelling of "preemie", which is slang for premature.

Francis and the Lights, k-os, and Preme each toured with prominent Canadian rapper Drake on his Away from Home Tour, which spanned North America. Preme often performed as an opening act. Due to legal troubles at the time, he was not able to cross into the United States and thus toured only in Canadian cities.

Alyssa Reid's international hit "Alone Again" features P Reign. The single was a hit in Canada and several European charts, peaking at number two on UK Singles Chart. Canadian band Hedley's single "Invincible", taken from their album Storms, features Preme. The single was released on August 23, 2011 and peaked number 9 on the Canadian Hot 100.

The Canadian Dream was issued as Preme's debut mixtape, released in early 2008. His second mixtape, When It Reigns It Pours, was released on November 1, 2010. His third mixtape was to be called True Kings Don't Die but was changed to Dear America and its release date was scheduled for July 4, 2013 but was postponed and released under RCA Records as an EP. Billboard magazine reported in March 2013 that Preme is collaborating with American rapper ASAP Rocky for the commercial release of "We Them Niggas", a song that preceded the release of Preme's Dear America EP. The EP was l released on September 9, 2014. His song "Realest in the City" featuring Meek Mill and PartyNextDoor peaked atop Billboard's "Emerging Artists" chart.

== Personal life ==
Preme has a son who was born in 2006.

In 2008, Reign was charged with nine counts of weapons possession charges after Toronto Police found three loaded handguns in the backseat of his leased Cadillac. He was acquitted of all charges on May 30, 2011. Preme referenced this on the unofficial remix to the song "Us" by Lil Reese rapping, "Drizzy dropped a hundred on my lawyer and I beat the case!"

Preme is close friends with fellow Torontonian rapper Drake and both have alluded to this on respective tracks. In the song "Intro" of his second mixtape, Reign raps "Shout out to Drizzy Drake, yeah that's my lil' bro / before the deal, we gettin' change like the corner store." Drake raps in the remake to Big Page's single "I'm Still Fly", "My brother P Reign knows we fuck with the same hoes / Plus he taught me how to spot an officer in plain clothes." Most recently, the two would collaborate (along with Southern rapper Future) on the single "DnF" from Reign's Dear America EP.

== Discography ==
=== As P. Reign ===
==== Extended plays ====
- 2014: Dear America EP

==== Mixtapes ====
- 2008: The Canadian Dream
- 2010: When It Reigns It Pours
- 2014: Dear America
- 2015: Off the Books

==== Singles ====
===== As lead artist =====
Title	Year	Peak chart positions				Album
Title	Year	CAN	US	US R&B	US Rap	Album
"Money in My Pocket"	2009	—	—	—	—	Non-album singles
"In My Hood"	2010	—	—	—	—	Non-album singles
"Call My Name" (featuring Kim Davis and Lokz)	2010	—	—	—	—	Non-album singles
"We Them Niggas" (featuring ASAP Rocky)	2014	—	—	—	—	Dear America
"Chickens" (featuring Waka Flocka Flame)	2014	—	—	—	—	Dear America
"DnF" (featuring Drake and Future)	2014	—	—	41	—	Dear America

===== As featured artist =====
Title	Year	Peak chart positions					Certifications (sales thresholds)	Album
Title	Year	CAN	BEL	IRL	NL	SCO	Certifications (sales thresholds)	Album
"Alone Again" (Alyssa Reid featuring P Reign)	2011	11	25	15	59	2	CAN: Gold	The Game
"Invincible" (Hedley featuring P Reign)	2011	9	—	—	—	—	CAN: 2× Platinum	Storms
"—" denotes a title that did not chart, or was not released in that territory.

==== Guest appearances ====
List of non-single guest appearances, with other performing artists, showing year released and album name
Title	Year	Other artist(s)	Album
"Go Hard"	2010	Strizzy Kastro, Belly	Non-album singles
"Reality"	2011	DJ Charlie Brown, Belly, Jahvon, Big Lean	Non-album singles
"Peace Out"	2011	Karl Wolf	Non-album singles
"Schemin Up"	2014	OB O'Brien, Drake	Non-album singles
"Alright"	2019	Trippie Redd, Wiz Khalifa	Non-album singles

=== As Preme ===
==== Studio albums ====
List of mixtapes, with selected chart positions
Title	Details	Peak chart positions
Title	Details	CAN
Light of Day	Released: May 4, 2018; Label: BPG, RCA; Format: Digital download	62

==== Extended plays ====
Title	Details
Link Up with Popcaan	Released: October 16, 2020; Label: Reps Up, Empire; Format: Digital download

==== Singles ====
As featured artist

Title	Year	Peak chart positions										Certifications	Album
Title	Year	CAN	AUS	AUT	GER	IRE	NLD	NOR	SWI	UK	US	Certifications	Album
"Jackie Chan" (Tiësto and Dzeko featuring Preme and Post Malone)	2018	7	13	19	25	17	3	13	27	5	52	ARIA: Platinum; BPI: 2× Platinum; BVMI: Gold; IFPI AUT: Gold	The London Sessions

== Awards and nominations ==
Year	Awards	Category	Nominated work	Result
2011	MuchMusic Video Awards	Hip Hop Video of the Year	"Call My Name"	Nominated
2011	MuchMusic Video Awards	Pop Video of the Year	"Alone Again" (with Alyssa Reid)	Nominated
2012	MuchMusic Video Awards	Video of the Year	"Invincible" (with Hedley)	Nominated
2012	MuchMusic Video Awards	Best Cinematography	"Invincible" (with Hedley)	Nominated
2012	MuchMusic Video Awards	Most Streamed Video of the Year	"Invincible" (with Hedley)	Nominated
2012	MuchMusic Video Awards	Your Fave Video of the Year	"Invincible" (with Hedley)	Nominated
2014	Much Music Video Awards	Hip Hop Video of the Year	"We Them" (with ASAP Rocky)	Nominated
2015	Juno Awards	Rap Recording of the Year	Dear America	Nominated
2015	Much Music Video Awards	Hip Hop Video of the Year	"DnF" (with Drake and Future)	Won
