= Now You See It (Shake That Ass) =

Single by Honorebel featuring Pitbull and Jump Smokers

from the album Club Scene
- Released: October 5, 2009
- Recorded: 2009
- Genre: Hip hop
- Length: 3:30
- Label: Ultra Records/OG Music
- Songwriter(s): Tony Arzadon; Honorebel; Sam Vincent Garcia; Pitbull; Justin M Roman
- Producer(s): Jump Smokers

Pitbull singles chronology
"Ni Rosas Ni Juguetes" (2009)	"Now You See It (Shake That Ass)" (2009)	"Fresh Out the Oven" (2009)

"Now You See It (Shake That Ass)" is a song by Jamaican singer Honorebel, featuring American rapper Pitbull and Jump Smokers. It was released as a digital download single on October 5, 2009.

The single is also included on Honorebel's second studio album Club Scene in 2010, under Ultra Records.

== Track listing ==
Digital download

1. "Now You See It" (Original Version) - 3:30
2. "Now You See It" (Radio Edit) - 3:28
3. "Now You See It" (Clean Mix) - 3:28
4. "Now You See It" (Club Mix) - 4:11
5. "Now You See It" (Afrojack Remix) - 4:44

== Credits and personnel ==
- Lead vocals – Honorebel, Pitbull and Jump Smokers
- Producers – Jump Smokers
- Lyrics – Honorebel, Armando Perez and Tony Arzadon
- Label: Ultra Records / OG Music

== Charts ==
Chart (2010)	Peak position
Poland (Dance Top 50)	11

== Release history ==
Region	Date	Format	Label
Worldwide	October 5, 2009	Digital Download	Ultra Records/OG Music
