= Stevie Appleton =

British singer, songwriter and producer

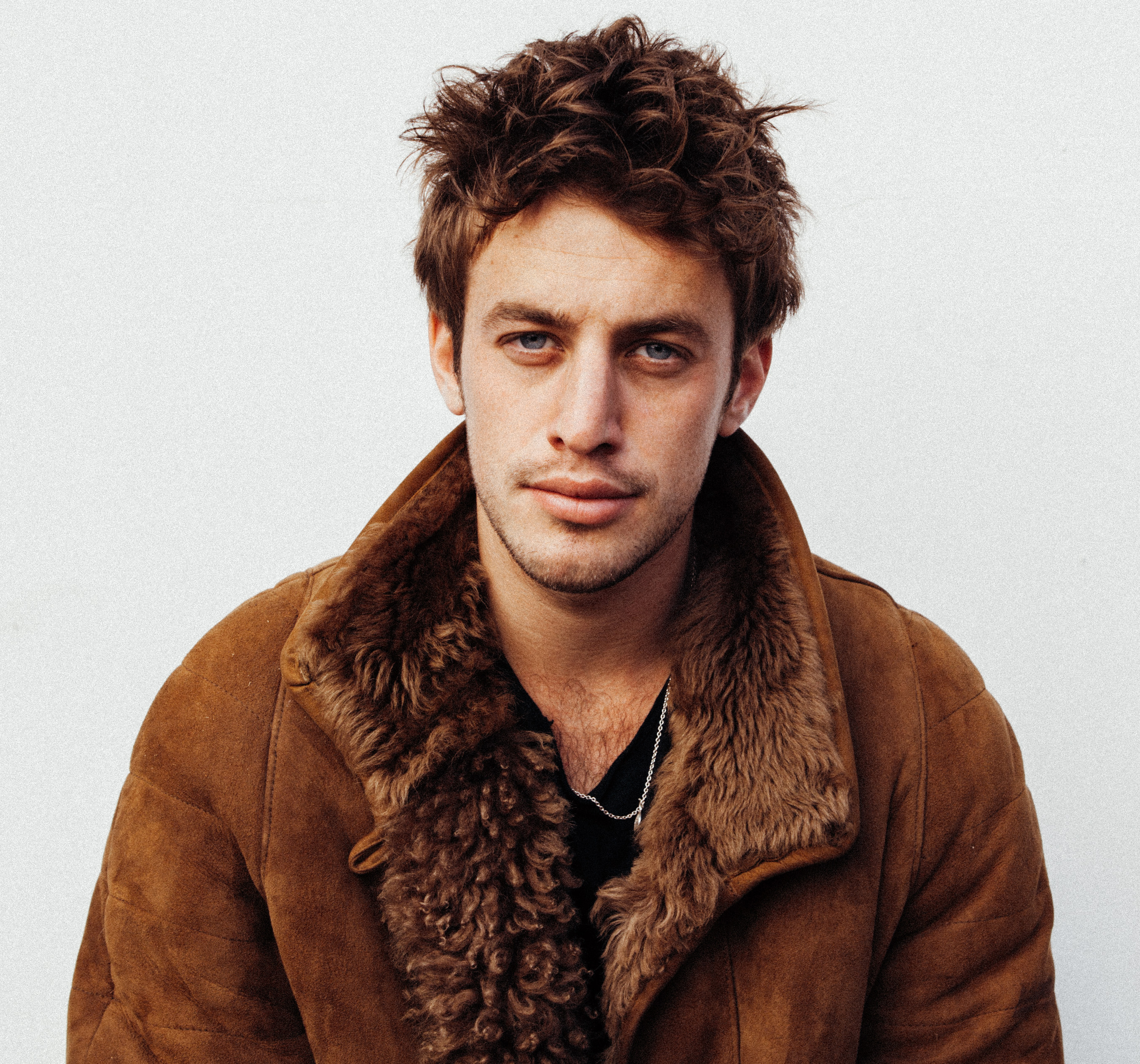

Background information
- Born: Stephen Appleton; May 1, 1989 (age 37); Surrey, England
- Occupations: Singer, songwriter, record producer
- Labels: Spinnin' Records, Warner Music Group
- Website: stevieappleton.com

Stephen Appleton (born 1 May 1989, in Surrey, England) is a British singer, songwriter and producer.

At the age of fifteen, Appleton began playing piano in a Soho restaurant improvising jazz and playing covers from the likes of Elton John and Billy Joel.

After graduating from a music college in London he was quickly signed by Spinnin' Record's based in The Netherlands, and recognised as one of their key writers. During his time there the label recognised his vocal and performing ability and, with Warner Music Group, released Appleton's debut single "Supposed To Do".

Appleton has since become a platinum-selling writer with artists including Tiësto, Cher Lloyd, Klingande and Filatov & Karas, with number 1s in Russia, Poland, Singapore. "Dirty Funk" was the 15th-best-performing song on Billboard's Japan Adult Contemporary chart. In December 2019, Appleton co-wrote and was the featured artist on the Tiësto single, "Blue".

== Discography ==
=== Singles ===
==== As lead artist ====
Title	Year	Label
"Supposed To Do"	2018	The Pop Shop / Warner Records
"Paradise" (with Sam Feldt)	2020	Heartfeldt Records

==== As featured artist ====
Title	Year	Label
"Blue" (Tiësto featuring Stevie Appleton)	2019	Musical Freedom
"What a life" (John Summit and Guz featuring Stevie Appleton)	2022	Off the Grid Records
"Science" (Deadmau5 with Stevie Appleton)	2026	Mau5trap
