= Honorebel =

- Born: Richard Mark Bailey; September 4, 1976 (age 49); St. Andrew Parish, Jamaica
- Other names: HonoRebel, Hono'Rebel, Honor-Rebel
- Occupations: Singer; rapper; songwriter; brand ambassador; entrepreneur; producer; actor
- Years active: 1999–present
- Children: 1
- Musical career
- Genres: Reggae; dancehall; hip hop; tropical house; pop; EDM
- Labels: Phantom Music Group; Cyclone J-Vibe Music; Zojak Worldwide; Planet Records Europe; Ultra Records; Pitbull; Luke; Sean Kingston; Trina; Scott Storch; Jump Smokers; Tarrus Riley; Snoop Dogg; Flo Rida; Charly Black; Benny Benassi; DJ Snake
- Website: honorebelmusic.com

Richard Mark Bailey (born September 4, 1976), known professionally as Honorebel, is a Jamaican born singer, rapper, songwriter, producer and CEO of Phantom Music Group (with partner Nick Lafond) and Caribbean Paradise Publishing LLC.

He first gained notoriety in 2009 with his single "Now You See It (Shake That Ass)" a collaboration with Pitbull, and Jump Smokers.

== Career ==
Honorebel began his career in the late 1990s, recording reggae, hip hop, dancehall and EDM music. He soon found himself collaborating with reggae legends such as Sly and Robbie, while infusing Hip-Hop Beats with producers like Scott Storch and EDM with Benny Benassi, Dj Snake, Afro Jack, Rune RK, Robbie Rivera and Tommy Trash just to name a few.

Honorebel has collaborated with artist such as the queen of reggae/dancehall Lady Saw, Gyptian, Shaggy, Sean Paul, Pitbull, Sean Kingston, Akon, Flo Rida and Willy Chirino just to name a few.

It was inevitable that Honorebel's music quickly morphed. He infused various styles to fit his deliverance, ranging from roots dancehall to Techno-pop to pop-rock, EDM to Tropical House, to reggaeton. Honorebel began to widen his musical catalog and his audience appeal, reaching as far as Russia, where he performed live at the Russian MTV Video Music Awards in 2007 with Russian Pop Star, Julia Kova in Moscow, Russia.

=== 2009-2013 ===
In August 2009, Honorebel signed a deal with Ultra Records, American indie EDM label. Within a month, He released his hit single "Now You See It (Shake That Ass)" featuring American rapper Pitbull and Jump Smokers in September 2009 and it takes the EDM club scene by storm world-wide.

"Now You See It (Shake That Ass)" has over 45 million views on YouTube, went #1 in 24 different countries world-wide, peaked at #22 on Billboard's Top 100 Dance Chart, #34 on the Billboard Hot 200 Chart. The song remained on the charts for multiple weeks. The single was released as a digital download on October 5, 2009, and was also included on Honorebel's second album, "Club Scene" in 2010, under Ultra Records.

The music video was directed by David Russio, and released with an aggressive viral campaign by Ultra Records. Within the first year, the video had accumulated over 10 million views on YouTube.

Barbadian singer, Rihanna, introduced the video for "Now You See It (Shake That Ass)" as it debuted on MuchMusic (Canada) in October 2009.

The single and remixed versions of "Now You See It (Shake That Ass)" is distributed on over 16+ Ultra Records dance compilations on iTunes worldwide.

The success of "Now You See It (Shake That Ass)" made it one of 2009's Top Club Bangers coming in at #9 on MTV and #13 on MuchMusic (Canada).

As the success of "Now You See It (Shake That Ass)" continued, Pitbull invited Honorebel to come out on the road as a supporting act for Pitbull's US multi-city Carnival tour, in late spring 2010.

Honorebel's debut album Club Scene with Ultra Records digitally released May 25, 2010. Collaborations on the album include island dance pop song, "My Girl" featuring Jamaican-American singer, Sean Kingston and American rapper, Trina. The single releases with a big forward from mainstream radio and Caribbean appeal. The official "My Girl" music video, directed by David Russio, hits hard on the media circuit with front page features on VEVO, Daily Motion, Yahoo! Music and many more.

Popular live urban music video show BET’s 106 & Park showcased the music video for "My Girl" featuring Sean Kingston and Trina as new joint of the day in August 2010. Around the same time, Honorebel was featured as "Artist On The Rise" on Windows Media Player's Feature page. FatMan Scoop added more power with his club banging dance remix of "My Girl" – Honorebel feat. Sean Kingston & FatMan Scoop, remixed by Disco Fries.

In March 2011, "I Wanna" featuring Pitbull single and music video was released by Ultra Records.

In 2012, Honorebel performed Reggae Sumfest, the largest music festival in Jamaica and the Caribbean, which takes place each year in mid-July in Montego Bay.

Honorebel's songs have earned placement in multiple motion pictures and television shows. "Now You See It (Shake That Ass)" was featured on CW Television Network hit show Hellcats in January 2012. "Now You See It (Shake That Ass)" and "I Wanna" both featured on Showtime's hit series Californication. Benny Benassi's remix of "Now You See It (Shake That Ass)" was included on the soundtrack for "Piranha 3D" the same year.

"Party On" featuring Disco Fries appeared on the soundtrack of Universal Pictures' blockbuster American Reunion, the fourth installment in the "American Pie" film series released also in 2012.

Mid summer 2012, "Strip Search" a single featuring Stephen Davids & Kelly Bomb went #1 on Malta PRS Charts.

"Ravin and Clean" was the #1 song in Africa and the #1 music video on Video Mix in South Florida in December 2012.

In 2013, the single "Caribbean Dream" appeared on the soundtrack of Zumba Fitness: World Party, one of the most popular fitness games in the world.

Honorebel and Pitbull collaborated again on "Seize The Night" officially released 2013, produced by Erik Rydmark & Sven Lundholm.

=== 2014-present ===
"Seize The Night" featuring Pitbull appeared Honorebel's third album Honor Roll on his new label, Phantom Music Group, in November 2014.

In the summer of 2015, Honorebel and Pitbullmade another classic entitled "She’s My Summer" which went #1 on the Swiss Dance Charts and steadily held position in the Top 10 in nine countries worldwide.

Honorebel's 2019 single "Bridal" features Nigerian recording artist Sound Sultan and Joe El.

Honorebel and American recording artist, Marica Linn came together collaboratively on the single, "Spotlight" released October 2019.

In November 2019, Honorebel released "Above the Noise", which, in addition to "Bridal", features songs including a Latin-tinged ballad collaboration with Tarrus Riley titled "Be Free". Other collaborations include 2018 single, "Let Me Love You" with GrooveGalore and Tessanne Chin. Honorebel collaborated with a few high-profile friends on Above The Noise, as Shaggy graces "Own The Night", while Charly Black appears on "Your Love." Dancehall veteran Wayne Wonder and rapper Rick Ross join Honorebel on "All Over."

Honorebel performed a variety of his hit songs including "Sauce Boss," accompanied by violin duo, Son's of Mystro, and "Spotlight," his "deeply invigorating" tropical house summer hit with Marica Linn, on NTV Uganda's music/dance/video show NTV Dance Party on June 13, 2020. The show was broadcast on national TV in Uganda and live streamed internationally on YouTube.

In July 2022, Honorebel collaborated with 2014 BMI Writer-of-the-Year Award Winner, SPIKY on amapiano hit "AssMazing" along with Third World Don.

== Discography ==
- Fire + Ice (2000)
- Club Scene (2010)
- Honorebel Presents Reggae Series #1(2011)
- Honorebel & Robothead Music Presents Reggae Series #2 (2012)
- Honor Roll (2014)
- Above the Noise (2019)
- Guru (2021)
- 444 (2023)
