= Jump Smokers =

Former electro house group

Jump Smokers!
- Also known as: Jumpsmokers
- Origin: Chicago, New York, United States
- Genres: Electro house; Dutch house; big room; Melbourne bounce
- Occupations: DJs; producers; remixers
- Instruments: Sampler; DJ digital controller
- Years active: 2009-2016, 2024-present
- Labels: Ultra
- Members: Justin Roman; Flipside

Jump Smokers were an electro house music group from the United States. The band consisted of members Justin Roman (vocals/lyrics) and Flipside (production/DJ).

== Background ==
The two met in Chicago, Illinois working for Chicago radio station B96 in 2003. They formed the group in 2009 along with producer Reydon and digital media designer Johnny Digital. Their debut album, Kings of the Dancefloor!, was released July 27, 2010 on Ultra Records. In 2012, Reydon moved on from the group and Marquee joined the group for 2 years.

== Career ==
In 2009, Jump Smokers featured on Honorebel's hit single "Now You See It (Shake That Ass)" alongside American rapper Pitbull. They later released their debut single in November titled "Don't Be a Douchebag". They released their debut studio album on 27 July 2010 via Ultra Records.

The band would go on to produce over a dozen remixes for various songs by Pitbull up until the group went defunct in 2016.

== Controversy ==
In 2009, they released "My Flow So Tight", a song criticizing Chris Brown for his altercation against Rihanna. The song gained radio airplay in cities across the country. A portion of the proceeds benefited various organizations for battered women.

== Discography ==
=== Studio albums ===
List of studio albums
Title	Album details
Kings of the Dancefloor!	Released: July 27, 2010; Label: Ultra Records; Format: CD, digital download

=== Extended plays ===
List of extended plays
Title	Album details
The Whisper EP, Vol. One	Released: April 23, 2014; Label: JS Sound; Formats: Digital download
The Voice & the Beats (with Paula DeAnda)	Released: June 24, 2014; Label: JS Sound; Formats: Digital download

=== Singles ===
==== As lead artist ====
List of singles as lead artist, with selected chart positions, showing year released and album name
Title	Year	Peak chart positions		Album
Title	Year	US	UK	Album
"Don't Be a Douchebag"	2010	—	—	Kings of the Dancefloor!
"Dance Rock Shake Pop" (featuring Alex Peace)	2010	—	—	Kings of the Dancefloor!
"Rebound" (featuring Frankie J)	2010	—	—	Kings of the Dancefloor!
"Faded"	2010	—	—	Kings of the Dancefloor!
"Manila Anthem" (featuring Audiobot)	2013	—	—	Non-album singles
"We Ready (Swish)"	2014	—	—	Non-album singles
"Photobomb" (featuring Baby Bash)	2014	—	—	Non-album singles
"Deserve Better" (featuring Austin Mahone)	2016	—	—	Non-album singles
"—" denotes a recording that did not chart or was not released in that territory.

==== As featured artist ====
List of singles as featured artist, with selected chart positions, showing year released and album name
Title	Year	Peak chart positions				Album
Title	Year	US Digital	BEL	NL	UK	Album
"Now You See It (Shake That Ass)" (Honorebel featuring Pitbull and Jump Smokers)	2009	43	—	—	—	Club Scene
"Alone Again" (Alyssa Reid featuring Jump Smokers)	2011	—	25	59	2	The Game
"Vegas Nights" (Baby Bash featuring Jump Smokers)	2011	—	—	—	—	Non-album single
"—" denotes a recording that did not chart or was not released in that territory.

=== Other charted songs ===
List of songs, with selected chart positions, showing year released and album name
Title	Year	Peak chart positions	Album
Title	Year	AUT	Album
"Superstar" (featuring Pitbull and Qwote)	2010	41	Kings of the Dancefloor!
"—" denotes a recording that did not chart or was not released in that territory.

=== Remixes ===
- Demi Lovato – "Cool for the Summer" (Jump Smokers Remix)
