= List of best-selling singles in 2012 (France) =

This is the list of the best-selling singles in 2012 in France. Rankings are based on the combined sales of physical and digital singles.

== Top 200 singles ==
Pos.	Artist(s)	Single
1	Michel Teló	"Ai Se Eu Te Pego"
2	Gotye featuring Kimbra	"Somebody That I Used to Know"
3	Carly Rae Jepsen	"Call Me Maybe"
4	Psy	"Gangnam Style"
5	Adele	"Skyfall"
6	Lykke Li	"I Follow Rivers"
7	Lana Del Rey	"Video Games"
8	Shakira	"Je l'aime à mourir"
9	Sexion d'Assaut	"Avant qu'elle parte"
10	Rihanna	"Diamonds"
11	Asaf Avidan	"One Day / Reckoning Song"
12	Birdy	"Skinny Love"
13	Tacabro	"Tacata'"
14	Gusttavo Lima	"Balada"
15	Adele	"Someone like You"
16	C2C	"Down the Road"
17	Sexion d'Assaut	"Ma direction"
18	Kid Cudi	"Pursuit of Happiness"
19	Pitbull	"Back in Time"
20	Sexion d'Assaut	"Wati House"
21	Tal	"Le sens de la vie"
22	Flo Rida	"Whistle"
23	Rihanna	"Where Have You Been"
24	Nicki Minaj	"Starships"
25	Irma	"I Know"
26	Fun featuring Janelle Monáe	"We Are Young"
27	David Guetta featuring Sia	"Titanium"
28	LMFAO	"Sexy and I Know It"
29	Shaka Ponk	"My Name Is Stain"
30	Kavinsky	"Nightcall"
31	David Guetta featuring Sia	"She Wolf (Falling to Pieces)"
32	Collectif Paris-Africa	"Des ricochets"
33	will.i.am featuring Eva Simons	"This Is Love"
34	DJ Antoine	"Ma Chérie"
35	Matt Houston featuring P-Square	"Positif"
36	Shy'm	"Et alors !"
37	Keedz	"Stand on the Word"
38	Adele	"Rolling in the Deep"
39	Jose de Rico featuring Henry Mendez	"Rayos de sol"
40	M83	"Midnight City"
41	Alex Ferrari	"Bara Bará Bere Berê"
42	Pitbull featuring Chris Brown	"International Love"
43	Maroon 5 featuring Wiz Khalifa	"Payphone"
44	Adele	"Set Fire to the Rain"
45	Jay-Z featuring Kanye West	"Niggas in Paris"
46	Snoop Dogg and Wiz Khalifa featuring Bruno Mars	"Young, Wild and Free"
47	will.i.am featuring Britney Spears	"Scream & Shout"
48	Marlon Roudette	"New Age"
49	Khaled	"C'est la vie"
50	Coldplay	"Paradise"
51	Orelsan	"La terre est ronde"
52	Owl City and Carly Rae Jepsen	"Good Time"
53	Foster the People	"Pumped Up Kicks"
54	Birdy	"People Help the People"
55	David Guetta featuring Nicki Minaj	"Turn Me On"
56	Alicia Keys	"Girl on Fire"
57	BB Brunes	"Coups et blessures"
58	Madonna featuring Nicki Minaj and M.I.A.	"Give Me All Your Luvin'"
59	Rihanna featuring Calvin Harris	"We Found Love"
60	DJ Mam's featuring Jessy Matador and Luis Guisao	"Zumba He Zumba Ha"
61	Jessie J	"Domino"
62	Bruno Mars	"Locked Out of Heaven"
63	Avicii	"Levels"
64	Emeli Sandé	"Next to Me"
65	Youssoupha	"Dreamin'"
66	Chris Brown	"Don't Wake Me Up"
67	Skip the Use	"Ghost"
68	R.I.O. featuring Nicco	"Party Shaker"
69	Emeli Sandé	"Read All About It (Part III)"
70	Flo Rida	"Good Feeling"
71	Breakbot	"Baby I'm Yours"
72	Alex Clare	"Too Close"
73	Flo Rida featuring Sia	"Wild Ones"
74	Jennifer Lopez featuring Pitbull	"Dance Again"
75	Taio Cruz featuring Flo Rida	"Hangover"
76	Maroon 5 featuring Christina Aguilera	"Moves like Jagger"
77	Celine Dion	"Parler à mon père"
78	Don Omar featuring Lucenzo	"Danza Kuduro"
79	LMFAO featuring Lauren Bennett and GoonRock	"Party Rock Anthem"
80	Shakira	"Addicted to You"
81	Simple Plan featuring Sean Paul	"Summer Paradise"
82	Muse	"Madness"
83	Selena Gomez & the Scene	"Love You like a Love Song"
84	Moussier Tombola	"Logobitombo"
85	Vanessa Paradis and -M-	"La Seine"
86	Maroon 5	"One More Night"
87	Flo Rida	"I Cry"
88	M. Pokora and Tal	"Envole-moi"
89	Coldplay and Rihanna	"Princess of China"
90	Keen'V	"Les mots"
91	Rod Janois	"Ça ira mon amour"
92	Sean Paul	"She Doesn't Mind
93	Gossip	"Heavy Cross"
94	Bob Sinclar	"Rock the Boat"
95	Mylène Farmer	"À l'ombre"
96	Basto	"Again and Again"
97	Lana Del Rey	"Born to Die"
98	Katy Perry	"Part of Me"
99	Axel Tony and Tunisiano	"Avec toi"
100	LMFAO	"Sorry for Party Rocking"
101	Mika	"Elle me dit"
102	Kelly Clarkson	"Stronger (What Doesn't Kill You)"
103	Whitney Houston	"I Will Always Love You"
104	Far East Movement featuring Justin Bieber	"Live My Life"
105	Jay-Z featuring Alicia Keys	"Empire State of Mind"
106	Skrillex	"Bangarang"
107	Global Deejays	"Hardcore Vibes"
108	Lil Wayne featuring Bruno Mars	"Mirror"
109	Canardo and Tal	"M'en aller"
110	Earth, Wind & Fire	"September"
111	Train	"Drive By"
112	David Guetta featuring Usher	"Without You"
113	Cascada	"Summer of Love"
114	Drake featuring Rihanna	"Take Care"
115	Basto	"Cloudbreaker"
116	Yeah Yeah Yeahs	"Heads Will Roll"
117	Kristina Maria and Corneille	"Co-Pilot"
118	Nicki Minaj	"Pound the Alarm"
119	M. Pokora	"Juste un instant"
120	Shakira featuring Freshlyground	"Waka Waka (This Time for Africa)"
121	Keen'V	"Ma vie au soleil"
122	One Direction	"What Makes You Beautiful"
123	Les Enfoirés	"Encore un autre hiver"
124	Shy'm	"On se fout de nous"
125	Sexion d'Assaut	"Problèmes d'adultes"
126	Usher	"Scream"
127	Justin Bieber	"Boyfriend"
128	Dry featuring Maître Gims	"Ma mélodie"
129	Madonna	"Girl Gone Wild"
130	Sexion d'Assaut	"Balader"
131	Lana Del Rey	"Blue Jeans"
132	The Wanted	"Glad You Came"
133	Katy Perry	"Firework"
134	Calvin Harris	"Feel So Close"
135	Ellie Goulding	"Lights"
136	Jenifer	"Sur le fil"
137	Sean Paul	"Hold On"
138	Katy Perry	"Wide Awake"
139	Laurent Voulzy	"Jeanne"
140	Jason Derülo	"Breathing"
141	Kenza Farah and Soprano	"Coup de coeur"
142	Chris Brown	"Turn Up the Music"
143	The Black Eyed Peas	"I Gotta Feeling"
144	Earth, Wind & Fire	"Boogie Wonderland"
145	Ed Sheeran	"The A Team"
146	Basto	"I Rave You"
147	Rihanna	"Talk That Talk"
148	Linkin Park	"Burn It Down"
149	Far East Movement featuring Cover Drive	"Turn Up the Love"
150	Ne-Yo	"Let Me Love You"
151	Gossip	"Perfect World"
152	Wati-B featuring Big Ali	"Watibigali"
153	DJ Mam's	"Fiesta Buena"
154	Katy Perry	"The One That Got Away"
155	Mylène Farmer	"Du temps"
156	Jeff Buckley	"Hallelujah"
157	Pink	"Try"
158	Laza Morgan	"One By One"
159	Rihanna	"You da One"
160	Booba	"Scarface"
161	Pink	"Blow Me (One Last Kiss)"
162	Kesha	"Die Young"
163	Pulcino Pio	"Le poussin piou"
164	Tal	"Je prends le large"
165	David Guetta featuring Chris Brown and Lil Wayne	"I Can Only Imagine"
166	Lucenzo	"Baila morena"
167	Wiz Khalifa	"Work Hard, Play Hard"
168	One Direction	"Live While We're Young"
169	Sultan featuring Rohff	"4 Etoiles"
170	Bruno Mars	"Marry You"
171	Havana Brown	"We Run the Night"
172	Shaka Ponk	"Let's Bang"
173	Amel Bent	"Je reste"
174	Cobra Starship featuring Sabi	"You Make Me Feel..."
175	Rihanna	"Man Down"
176	The Black Keys	"Lonely Boy"
177	Amel Bent	"Délit"
178	Jenifer	"L'amour & moi"
179	Ornette	"Crazy"
180	Metronomy	"The Look"
181	Sexion d'Assaut	"J'reste debout"
182	Selah Sue	"This World"
183	Mike Candys and Jack Holiday	"Children"
184	Selah Sue	"Raggamuffin"
185	Swedish House Mafia	"Greyhound"
186	Bastian Baker	"Hallelujah"
187	1789: Les Amants de la Bastille	"Pour la peine"
188	Scorpions	"Still Loving You"
189	Sexion d'Assaut	"Désolé"
190	Hardwell	"Spaceman"
191	Radiohead	"Creep"
192	Ludovico Einaudi	"Fly"
193	Electric Guest	"This Head I Hold"
194	Zaz	"Eblouie par la nuit"
195	U2	"With or Without You"
196	-M-	"Mojo"
197	Booba	"Caramel"
198	Eagles	"Hotel California"
199	Brooke Fraser	"Something in the Water"
200	Robbie Williams	"Candy"

== See also ==
- 2012 in music
- List of number-one hits of 2012 (France)
- List of top 10 singles in 2012 (France)
