= Zumba Fitness Dance Party =

Compilation album

Zumba Fitness Dance Party is a series of compilation albums of various Zumba style songs including Latin international successes.

Two volumes have been released in 2012 with each comprising two CDs. In 2013, a third album was released comprising 2 CDs.

== 2012: Zumba Fitness Dance Party (Vol. 1) ==
Zumba Fitness Dance Party

Compilation album by Various artists
- Released: 23 July 2012
- Recorded: Various times
- Genre: Dance, Pop
- Label: Universal Music Group

Series chronology
Zumba Fitness Dance Party (2012)	Zumba Fitness - Dance Party Vol. 2 (2012)

Zumba Fitness Dance Party (or full title Zumba Fitness Dance Party: 2012 Summer Latin Dance Hits) is a 2-CD.

In its first week of release, it entered the SNEP French Top 200 Albums Chart at #3 and made it to #1 in week 2. It also made it to #5 on the Swiss Albums Chart.

=== Track list ===
CD 1

1. Lucenzo feat. Don Omar : "Danza Kuduro (3:32)
2. Zumba Fitness – "El amor, el amor" (4:24)
3. Tacabro – "Tacata'" (2:57)
4. Zumba Fitness – "Dance, Dance, Dance" (3:44)
5. Michel Teló – "Ai se eu te pego!" (2:46)
6. Zumba Fitness – "Mi vecina" (3:59)
7. Nicki Minaj – "Starships" (3:30)
8. Zumba Fitness – "If You Wanna Dance" (3:46)
9. Gusttavo Lima – "Balada (Tche Tcherere Tche Tche)" 3:23
10. Zumba Fitness – "Zumba Mami" (3:36)
11. Jennifer Lopez – "On the Floor" (3:39)
12. Zumba Fitness – "Estamos calienticos" (3:46)
13. Flo Rida – "Good Feeling" (4:07)
14. Zumba Fitness – "Flores pa' regar" (3:21)
15. Sushy – "Water" (2:46)
16. Zumba Fitness – "Dancing Salsa" (3:13)
17. Costuleta – "Maya" (3:17)
18. Zumba Fitness – "Sukumbiarabe" (3:41)
19. Pitbull – "I Know You Want Me (Calle Ocho)" (3:47)

CD 2

1. Wisin y Yandel feat. Jennifer Lopez – "Follow the Leader" (3:59)
2. Zumba Fitness – "Feel Like Dancing" (3:54)
3. Rihanna – "Only Girl (In the World)" (3:55)
4. Zumba Fitness – Merehop (5:23)
5. Lil John & The East Side Boyz feat. Busta Rhymes, Elephant Man & Ying Yang Twins – "Get Low (Merengue Mix)" (4:01)
6. Zumba Fitness – "Pa' la discoteka a bailar" (4:20)
7. Jose de Rico feat. Henry Mendez – "Rayos de sol" (3:52)
8. Mohombi – "Bumpy Ride" (3:44)
9. Zumba Fitness – "Mawa sillah" (3:55)
10. The Black Eyed Peas – "I Gotta Feeling" (4:05)
11. Collectif Métissé – "Z Dance" (3:10)
12. Shakira feat. Wyclef Jean – "Hips Don't Lie (Bamboo Remix) (3:34)
13. Zumba Fitness – "Chismosita" (5:31)
14. Keen'V – "Ma vie au soleil" (3:05)
15. Zumba Fitness – "Quero volver a mis 20" (4:10)
16. DJ Antoine feat. The Beat Shakers – "Ma chérie 2k12" (3:11)
17. Zumba Fitness – "Too Hot" (3:09)
18. Havana Delirio 1830 – "Carnavalera" (3:03)

=== Charts ===
Chart (2011–2012)	Peak position
SNEP (French Albums Chart)	1
Hitparade (Swiss Music Charts)	5

== 2012: Zumba Fitness - Dance Party Vol. 2 ==
Zumba Fitness Dance Party Vol. 2

Compilation album by Various artists
- Released: 1 December 2012
- Recorded: Various times
- Genre: Dance, Pop
- Label: Universal Music Group

Series chronology
Zumba Fitness - Dance Party (2012)	Zumba Fitness Dance Party Vol. 2 (2012)	Zumba Fitness - Dance Party Summer 2013 (2013)

After great success of the initial release, a second volume of 2 more CDs was released, with full title as Zumba Fitness Dance Party" 2012 Top Latin Dance Hits. However it met much lesser success reaching just #20 in the French Albums Chart.

=== Track list ===
CD 1:

1. PSY – "Gangnam Style" (3:39)
2. Zumba Fitness – "Sweet Girl" (3:25)
3. Shakira feat. El Cata – "Loca" (3:03)
4. Zumba Fitness – "Este Party Esta Prendio" (4:03)
5. will.i.am feat. Eva Simons – "This Is Love" (4:41)
6. Zumba Fitness – "Es tiempo de bailar" (4:17)
7. Rihanna – "Where Have You Been" (4:02)
8. Zumba Fitness – "El Bacilon" (3:59)
9. Carly Rae Jepsen – "Call Me Maybe" (3:13)
10. Zumba Fitness – "Get Your Sticks" (5:03)
11. DJ Mam's feat. Soldat Jahman & Luis Guisao – "Zumba He Zumba Ha (3:18)
12. Mara feat. Beto – "Crazy Love" (3:01)
13. Pitbull – "Back in Time" (3:26)
14. Zumba Fitness – "Sigue La Cumbia" (4:22)
15. Flo Rida – "Whistle (3:44)
16. Zumba Fitness – "4 Elements" (5:11)
17. Sushy – "Jumpin'up" (3:27)
18. Zumba Fitness – "Tu Remedio" (4:00)

CD 2:

1. Don Omar – "Zumba" (4:23)
2. Zumba Fitness – "La bruja de la Cosquilla" (4:40)
3. Paulina Rubio – "All Around the World" (3:44)
4. Zumba Fitness – "Te llaman a grabar" (4:34)
5. Nicki Minaj – "Pound the Alarm" (3:25)
6. Zumba Fitness – "Maria" (4:32)
7. Alex Ferrari – "Bara Bará Bere Berê" (3:42)
8. Zumba Fitness – "Hindu Cumen" (4:24)
9. Keen'v – "Elle t'a mat Fatoumata" (2:52)
10. Zumba Fitness – "Dance With Me" (4:36)
11. Vanilla Ice – "Ice Ice Baby (Zumba Remix)" (3:42)
12. Zumba Fitness – "Coisa Brasileira" (3:59)
13. Collectif Metiss – "Ma Demoiselle" (3:10)
14. Zumba Fitness – "Funkizinho" (4:56)
15. Big Joe – "Boom Boom Boom" (2:59)
16. Zumba Fitness – "Tu Bomboncito" (5:13)
17. Typik'hall – "Si tu sors ce soir" (3:26)
18. Zumba Fitness – "Vuelve a mi lado" (3:24)
19. Wyclef Jean – "Historia" (3:37)

=== Charts ===
Chart (2011–2012)	Peak position
SNEP (French Albums Chart)	20

== 2012: Zumba Fitness - Dance Party 2 ==
This was a special release that was slightly different in its tracks from Zumba Fitness - Dance Party Vol. 2.

=== Track list ===
CD 1

1. PSY – "Gangnam Style" (3:40)
2. Zumba Fitness – "Sweet Girl" (3:260
3. Shakira feat. Pitbull – "Rabiosa" (2:50)
4. Zumba Fitness – "Este party esta prendio" (4:05)
5. will.i.am feat. Eva Simons – "This Is Love" (4:41)
6. Zumba Fitness – "Es tiempo de bailar" (4:18)
7. Rihanna – "Where Have You Been" (4:02)
8. Zumba Fitness – "El bacilon" (3:59)
9. Carly Rae Jepsen – "Call Me Maybe" (3:14)
10. Zumba Fitness – "Get Your Sticks" (5:03)
11. DJ Mam's feat. Soldat Jahman & Luis Guisao – "Zumba He Zumba Ha" (3:19)
12. Mara feat. Beto – "Crazy Love" (3:02)
13. Pitbull – "Back in Time" (3:26)
14. Zumba Fitness – "4 Elements" (4:23)
15. Flo Rida – "Whistle" (3:45)
16. Zumba Fitness – "Sigue la cumbia" (5:12)
17. Sushy – "Jumpin'up" (3:28)
18. Zumba Fitness – "Tu remedio" (4:02)
19. Tacabro – "Así así" (3:03)

CD 2

1. Don Omar – "Zumba" (4:24)
2. Zumba Fitness – "La bruja de la cosquilla" (4:41)
3. Taio Cruz feat. Pitbull – "There She Goes" (3:29)
4. Zumba Fitness – "Te llaman a grabar" (4:34)
5. Nicki Minaj – "Va Va Voom" (3:04)
6. Zumba Fitness – "Maria" (4:33)
7. Alex Ferrari – "Bara Bará Bere Berê" (3:43)
8. Zumba Fitness – "Hindu-Cumen" (4:23)
9. Robbie Williams – "Candy" (3:20)
10. Zumba Fitness – "Dance With Me" (4:37)
11. Ola – "I'm In Love" (3:19)
12. Zumba Fitness – "Coisa brasileira" (4:00)
13. João Neto & Frederico – "Lê lê lê" (2:41)
14. Zumba Fitness – "Funkizinho" (4:56)
15. Big Joe – "Boom Boom Boom" (2:59)
16. Zumba Fitness – "Tu bomboncito" (5:13)
17. Seeed – "Augenbling" (3:38)
18. Zumba Fitness – "Vuelve a mi lado" (3:25)
19. Nelly Furtado – "Waiting For the Night" (4:30)
20. Zumba Fitness – "Bem vindos" (4:18)

=== Charts ===
Chart (2011–2012)	Peak position
(Austrian Albums Chart)	16
SNEP (French Albums Chart)	178
Hitparade (Swiss Albums Chart)	5

== 2013: Zumba Fitness - Dance Party Summer 2013 ==
Zumba Fitness Dance Party Summer 2013

Compilation album by Various artists
- Released: 15 July 2013
- Recorded: Various times
- Genre: Dance, Pop
- Label: Universal Music Group

Series chronology
Zumba Fitness – Dance Party Vol. 2 (2012)	Zumba Fitness Dance Party Summer 2013 (2013)

As a follow-up of the 2012 two volume release, a third volume of 2 more CDs was issued in the summer of 2013 containing 39 titles.It reached #11 in the French Albums Chart.

=== Track list ===
CD 1:

1. David Guetta feat. Sia – "Titanium" (4:03)
2. Zumba Fitness – "La Luz Del Flow" (3:49)
3. Daddy Yankee – "Limbo" (3:44)
4. Zumba Fitness – "Ponte Los Tenis" (4:04)
5. Lucenzo – "Baila Morena" (2:58)
6. Zumba Fitness – "Bem Vindos" (4:18)
7. will.i.am feat. Justin Bieber – "#thatPOWER" (4:39)
8. Zumba Fitness – "Siente" (2:59)
9. Lumidee feat. Steve Forest, Nicola Fasano & Pitbull – "Crazy" (radio edit) (3:26)
10. Zumba Fitness – "Gimme Five" (radio edit) (3:05)
11. Lil Jon – Work (3:33)
12. Zumba Fitness – "Vamo A Baila" (3:27)
13. DJ Mam's feat. Luis Guisao, Soldat Jahman – "Fiesta Buena" (3:08)
14. Zumba Fitness – "Baila Baila" (4:13)
15. Robin Thicke feat. Pharrell – "Blurred Lines" (no rap version) (3:51)
16. Zumba Fitness – "Zumba Loco" (3:22)
17. Avicii vs Nicky Romero – "I Could Be the One" (Nicktim – radio edit) (3:29)
18. Zumba Fitness – "Rumba En Moscu" (4:27)
19. Arash feat. Sean Paul – "She Makes Me Go" (radio edit) (2:57)
20. Zumba Fitness – "Zupersonik Luv" (3:04)

CD 2:

1. Owl City & Carly Rae Jepsen – "Good Time" (3:25)
2. Zumba Fitness – "Zumba Shake"(2:02)
3. Afrojack feat. Chris Brown – "As Your Friend" (explicit) (3:59)
4. Zumba Fitness – "Give It Up" (2:31)
5. Jay Santos – "Caliente" (radio edit) (3:22)
6. Zumba Fitness – "Zumbando Al Son" (5:34)
7. Sebastian Ingrosso & Alesso feat. Ryan Tedder – "Calling (Lose My Mind)" (3:20)
8. Zumba Fitness – "I'm Ready" (3:37)
9. Rihanna – "Man Down (album version) (4:26)
10. Zumba Fitness – "My Bonita" (4:24)
11. Collectif Métissé – "Mariana" (3:22)
12. Zumba Fitness – "Quemando Bota" (2:44)
13. Flavel & Neto feat. Anna Torres – "Pedida Perfeita (Tararatata)" (version Française) (2:51)
14. Zumba Fitness – "Maue" (3:49)
15. Dr. Bellido feat. Papa Joe – "Señorita" (radio mix) (3:25)
16. Zumba Fitness – "I Wanna Move" (3:32)
17. Major Lazer feat. Busy Signal, The Flexican, FS Green – "Watch Out For This (Bumaye)" (4:29)
18. Zumba Fitness – "Leyloley" (4:24)
19. Calprit – "Fiesta" (3:53)

=== Charts ===
Chart (2013)	Peak position
SNEP (French Albums Chart)	11
Hitparade (Swiss Albums Chart)	6
