= Zumba Fitness =

Zumba Fitness may refer to:

== Video games ==
- Zumba Fitness (video game), a video game
- Zumba Fitness 2, a video game
- Zumba Fitness Core, a video game
- Zumba Fitness: World Party, a video game
- Zumba Kids, a video game

== Other uses ==
- Zumba AKA Zumba Fitness, physical exercise movement created by dancer and choreographer Beto Perez
- Zumba Fitness Dance Party, a compilation album of dance hits

== See also ==
- Zumba (disambiguation)
