= Caliente (Jay Santos song) =

Single by Jay Santos
- Released: 26 February 2013
- Recorded: 2012
- Genre: Reggaeton, hip house, electro house
- Label: Blanco y Negro Music
- Songwriters: Jorge Aaron Pullas Medrano, German Felipe Garzon Valenzuela

Jay Santos singles chronology
"Noche de estrellas" (2012)	"Caliente" (2013)

Music video
- "Caliente" on YouTube

"Caliente" is a 2013 Spanish language dance hit single by Jay Santos released on the Spanish Blanco y Negro Music record label. It was released on 26 February 2013 becoming the first solo charting hit of Jay santos, after his 2012 success as a featured artist on Spanish DJ and producer Jose de Rico and Spanish-Dominican singer Henry Mendez European hit "Noche de estrellas". Lyrics: La fiesta esta buena es pa beber pa bailar... Si tu estas soltera a mi gustaria probar

== Track listing ==
1. "Caliente" (Radio Edit) (3:22)
2. "Caliente" (Extended Version) (5:26)
3. "Caliente" (Acapella) (3:22)

== Charts ==
=== Weekly charts ===
Chart (2013)	Peak position
Belgium (Ultratop 50 Flanders)	24
Belgium (Ultratop 50 Wallonia)	22
France (SNEP)	36
Spain (Promusicae)	32
Switzerland (Schweizer Hitparade)	12

=== Year-end charts ===
Chart (2013)	Position
France (SNEP)	130
