= Noche de estrellas (disambiguation) =

Noche de estrellas literally "night of stars" in Spanish language may refer to:

== Songs ==
- "Noche de estrellas", 2012 single by Jose de Rico & Henry Mendez featuring Jay Santos
- "Noche de estrellas", a track by rapper Benzino from his album Arch Nemesis
- "Noche de estrellas", a track by Yaga & Mackie on their album Clase Aparte
- "Noche de estrellas", a song by Malando appearing in Vol. 7 of series of compilation albums titled Superior Dancing

== Television and variety ==
- Noche de estrellas, a Latin American musical variety television show series
- Noche de estrellas de Fidelity, a famous series of musical events by WFID, Radio Fidelity
