= Zumba (disambiguation) =

Zumba is a fitness program involving dance and aerobic elements.

Zumba may also refer to:

- Ganga Zumba (died 1678), Brazilian leader
- Zumba, stage name of Zaza Korinteli (born 1973), Georgian rock musician
- Zumba (crater), on Mars
- Zumba, Ecuador, capital of Chinchipe Canton
- "Zumba" (song), a 2012 song by Don Omar
- Zumba (mascot), the official mascot for Sporting Clube de Goa

== See also ==
- Zumba Fitness (disambiguation)
