= Alberto Perlman =

American businessman

- Alberto Perlman at SXSW London 2026
- Born: 1977 (age 48–49); Colombia
- Education: B.A. Babson College
- Occupation: Businessman
- Known for: Co-founder of Zumba Fitness

Alberto Perlman (born 1977) is a Colombian American businessman and co-founder of Zumba Fitness.

== Biography ==
Alberto Perlman was born to a Jewish family in Colombia in 1977, the great-grandson of an immigrant from Jerusalem. He has two brothers, Jeffrey and Joel. His father owned a factory that made leather goods for export and operated a distribution center in the United States. In 1994, Perlman moved to the United States. In 1998, he graduated from Babson College with a B.A. in finance and information systems. After school, he worked as a management consultant where he analyzed the effectiveness of its TV advertising for a bank. In 1999, he and a partner organized a business conference in Miami sponsored by I.B.M., Telefónica, and others to bring together Latin American entrepreneurs with venture capitalists. In 1999, along with three partners, he then created a venture capital firm for Latin American internet entrepreneurs called Spydre Labs which funded Spanish-language clones of U.S. dotcom businesses which they then sold to the cloned U.S. company. They raised and invested several million dollars before the tech bubble burst in 2001.

Now unemployed, his mother suggested that he get together with fitness instructor and recent immigrant to Miami, Alberto "Beto" Pérez - with whom she had taken classes in Colombia - and start a business to market his fitness routine set to Latin and international music that was very popular in Colombia. In 2001, they partnered with Perlman's childhood friend, Alberto Aghion, and founded Zumba Fitness. Initially, they were unsuccessful in marketing to the various fitness chains. In 2005, they changed their strategy and pooling their last $14,000, they targeted fitness instructors using direct marketing via videos and TV infomercials; their effort was quite successful with 450 people signing up for an initial $300 fee and a further $30 a month to become licensed Zumba instructors. The fitness routine became popular nationally and the Zumba Instructor Network grew; they then branched into direct video sales. As of 2010, Zumba Fitness is in 50,000 locations in 75 countries. In 2012, Insight Venture Partners and The Raine Group made an investment. In 2013, Inc magazine estimated the value of the company at $500 million. By 2015, according to Perlman, there were 14 million Zumba students in 186 countries. Bolstered by steady fee income, they expanded the brand into music collections, clothing, footwear, and video games (altogether about 50% of revenues are from ancillary products).
