= Fiesta Buena =

Single by DJ Mam's featuring Luis Guisao, Soldat Jahman & Beto Perez

from the album Fiesta Buena
- Released: 2012
- Recorded: 2012
- Genre: Zumba
- Label: Wagram
- Songwriters: Mounir Belkhir; Luis Guisao; Soldat Jahman

DJ Mam's singles chronology
"Zumba He Zumba Ha (Remix 2012)" (2012)	"Fiesta Buena" (2012)

Music video
- DJ Mam's featuring Luis Guisao, Soldat Jahman & Beto Perez - "Fiesta Buena" on YouTube

"Fiesta Buena" is a 2012 international hit song by DJ Mam's in Spanish and is credited to DJ Mam's featuring Luis Guisao, Soldat Jahman and Beto Perez. The song is written and composed by Mounir Belkhir, Luis Guisao and Soldat Jahman.

"Fiesta Buena" (literally a good party in Spanish) is the title track from the album of same title Fiesta Buena and the fifth single from the album after "Hella Décalé", "Zumba He Zumba Ha", "Zina Morena" and "Zumba He Zumba Ha (Remix 2012)".

== Genre ==
"Zumba He Zumba Ha" was based on Zumba, a music genre that was in origin a Colombian dance fitness program created by dancer and choreographer Alberto "Beto" Perez during the 1990s incorporating hip-hop, soca, samba, salsa, merengue, mambo, martial arts, and some Bollywood and belly dance moves.

== Music video ==
A music video was released filmed by ATL and G4 Films.

A special choreography video was also released featuring the choreography of Jean Marc Gourpil (Jyem) to teach the dance moves to the song.Video on YouTube

== Charts ==
Chart (2012)	Peak position
Ultratop Belgium Singles Chart (Wallonia)	50
SNEP French Singles Chart	12
