= Danny Romero (singer) =

Spanish singer & composer (born 1995)

- Born: Daniel Ramírez Romero; 21 May 1995 (age 31); Ingenio, Las Palmas, Canary Islands, Spain
- Genres: Latin pop; reggaeton; hip hop; latin house
- Occupations: Singer; disc jockey; composer; producer
- Instrument: Vocals
- Years active: 2012–present
- Label: Sony Music Spain

Daniel Ramírez Romero (Spanish: [daˈnjel raˈmiɾes roˈmeɾo]; born 21 May 1995), known professionally as Danny Romero, is a singer, disc jockey, composer and producer. Born in Las Palmas de Gran Canaria, Canary Islands. He began his career as a disc jockey after releasing "Agáchate" in 2012, his first single and one of his greatest successes, which reached number 42 on Spanish music charts. A year later, he had his first top 20 hit single "Motívate". His first album 11:11 was released in 2018.

== Style of Music ==
Romero's musical style has been described as always with Latin dance music as a reference, but it is different and unpredictable, ranging from Latin house to urban sounds, such as reggaeton and hip hop.

== Career ==
At the age of 10, a serious traffic accident forced Romero to spend almost 10 months of immobilisation at home, at which point he discovered the music production of his older brother's group. With him Romero began to experiment, to create his own music in his free time. At the age of 15, as a preferential cadet in the team of Puertos Las Palmas (being champion in Canary Islands and second in Spain), he had to choose between football and music.

A year later, he created "Agáchate", which was an immediate hit and has generated more than 30 million views on YouTube, swept clubs and sale lists in South America, reaching No. 1 in Venezuela. Since then he is one of the most-requested producers and DJs in Spain by artists, clubs and fans.

== Discography ==
Studio albums

- 11:11 (2018)

Singles

- "Agáchate" (2012)
- "Ella pide más" (featuring David Cuello, 2012)
- "Rosa sin espinas" (2012)
- "Motívate" (2013)
- "Cosas locas" (2014)
- "18 años" (featuring Juan Magán, 2015)
- "Carnaval" (featuring CHK, 2015)
- "Bandida" (featuring Maluma, 2015)
- "Bandida Remix" (featuring Maluma, 2015)
- "Punto final" (featuring Saga & Sonyc, 2015)
- "La oportunidad" (featuring Carlitos Rossy, 2016)
- "No creo en el amor" (featuring Sanco, 2016)
- "No creo en el amor" (featuring Sanco & Becky G, 2017)
- "Mil horas" (2017)
- "Tango" (featuring Cruz Cafuné, 2018)
- "Kamasutra" (featuring Jowell & Randy, 2018)
- "Raro" (featuring Kapla y Miky, 2018)
- "De tranquilote" (featuring Lérica, 2019)
- "Falling" (featuring CBank1k & Tk Kravitz, 2019)
- "El Hipo" (featuring Juan Magán, 2020)
- "Se Me Va" (featuring Nil Moliner, 2021)
- "La Baba" (2021)

As featured artist

- "I Feel Alone" / David Cuello featuring Danny Romero (2011)
- "Soltera" / José de Rico featuring Danny Romero & Fito Blanko (2014)
- "Como Yo" / Xuso Jones featuring Danny Romero (2018)
