= Zumba He Zumba Ha =

2011 single by DJ Mam's

"Zumba He Zumba Ha" is a 2011 international hit song by DJ Mam's in Spanish, French and Antillean Creole The song is written and composed by Mounir Belkhir, Luis Guisao and Soldat Jahman. The original hit was released by Mam's featuring Soldat Jahman & Luis Guisao on January 30, 2011, and followed by a remix released in May 2012 by DJ Mam's featuring Jessy Matador & Luis Guisao that also became a hit.

== Genre ==
"Zumba He Zumba Ha" was based on Zumba, a music genre that was in origin a Colombian dance fitness program created by dancer and choreographer Alberto "Beto" Perez during the 1990s incorporating hip-hop, soca, samba, salsa, merengue, mambo, martial arts, and some Bollywood and belly dance moves.

== DJ Mam's featuring Soldat Jahman & Luis Guisao version ==
"Zumba He Zumba Ha"

Single by DJ Mam's featuring Soldat Jahman & Luis Guisao

from the album Fiesta Buena
- Released: 2011
- Recorded: 2011
- Genre: Zumba
- Label: Space Party
- Songwriters: Mounir Belkhir; Luis Guisao; Soldat Jahman

DJ Mam's singles chronology
"Hella Décalé" (2009)	"Zumba He Zumba Ha" (2011)	"Zina Morena" (2011)

Music video
- DJ Mam's featuring Soldat Jahman & Luis Guisao - "Zumba He Zumba Ha" on YouTube

The original single release "Zumba He Zumba Ha", a hit for DJ Mam's, featured vocals from Soldat Jahman & Luis Guisao. DJ Mam's had found some success with "Hella Decalé" released in 2009 featuring vocals by Doukali & Soldat Jahman. A Marseille-based hit, "Hella Decalé" incorporated Coupé-Décalé and Maghrebin Arabic music and was a production by Music Media Consulting & Mam's Prod.

Based on success of "Hella Decalé", Music Media Consulting & Mam's Prod released DJ Mam's follow-up single, based this time on the zumba genre. "Zumba He Zumba Ha" became hugely popular in dance venues all over Europe during 2011 and also appeared for a single week on the SNEP Top 200 chart, the official French Singles Chart at #192.

=== Track list ===
1. "Zumba He Zumba Ha"
2. "Zumba He Zumba Ha" (club edit)
3. "Zumba He Zumba Ha" (extended)
4. "Zumba He Zumba Ha" (club remix)
5. "Zumba He Zumba Ha" (Dj Fred Tahiti remix)

=== Charts ===
Chart (2011)	Peak position
SNEP French Singles Chart	192

=== Music video ===
A music video was released filmed by ATL and G4 Films.

== DJ Mam's featuring Jessy Matador & Luis Guisao version ==
"Zumba He Zumba Ha (Remix 2012)"

Single by DJ Mam's featuring Jessy Matador & Luis Guisao

from the album Fiesta Buena
- Released: 2012
- Recorded: 2012
- Genre: Zumba
- Length: 3:13
- Label: Wagram Music
- Songwriters: Mounir Belkhir, Luis Guisao, Soldat Jahman

DJ Mam's singles chronology
"Zina Morena" (2011)	"Zumba He Zumba Ha (Remix 2012)" (2012)	"Fiesta Buena" (2012)

Jessy Matador singles chronology
"Galera" (2011)	"Zumba He Zumba Ha (Remix 2012)" (2012)	"Zuluminati" (2014)

Music video
- DJ Mam's featuring Jessy Matador & Luis Guisao - "Zumba He Zumba Ha (Remix 2012)" on YouTube

In 2012, a new remix version of "Zumba He, Zumba Ha" was released in collaboration with Jessy Matador creating far more interest in DJ Mam's music. The revamped single titled "Zumba He, Zumba Ha (Remix 2012)" credited to DJ Mam's featuring Jessy Matador & Luis Guisano became a major hit in France in June 2012 reaching #7 in SNEP 200 Singles Chart.

=== Charts ===
Chart (2012)	Peak position
Ultratip Belgium Singles Chart (Wallonia)	1
Ultratop Belgium Singles Chart (Wallonia)	17
Ultratip Belgium Singles Chart (Vlanders)	42
SNEP French Singles Chart	7
