= Zumba Fitness Core =

2012 video game

- North American Wii cover art
- Developer: Zoë Mode
- Publisher: Majesco
- Engine: In House
- Platforms: Wii, Xbox 360
- Release: NA: 16 October 2012; EU: 9 November 2012; AU: 15 November 2012
- Genre: Fitness game
- Modes: Single-player, Multiplayer

Zumba Fitness Core is the third video game in the installment of the Fitness series, based on the Zumba program. It is also the sequel Zumba Fitness 2 (2011), later followed by Zumba Fitness: World Party (2013). It is developed by Zoë Mode and published by Majesco. It was released on 16 October 2012. Unlike previous games, the game mainly focuses on the abdomen.

== Gameplay ==
Players practice various dances, led by Zumba creator Beto Perez and celebrity instructors Gina Grant and Tanya Beardsley as well as new characters Loretta Bates and Nicholas Logrea.
