= Te fuiste =

2012 single by José de Rico and Henry Mendez

- Cover of Spanish single release

Single by Jose de Rico & Henry Mendez
- Released: 2012
- Recorded: 2012
- Genre: Dance, Latin
- Label: Roster Music
- Songwriters: Henry Antonio Méndez Reynoso; José Manuel León Hierro; Leopoldo Gonzalez Carro; Cristian Pino Moreno

Jose de Rico & Henry Mendez singles chronology
"Te fuiste" (2012)	"Rayos de sol" (2012)

Music video
- "te fuiste" on YouTube

"Te fuiste (Willy Fontana remix)"

Single by Jose de Rico & Henry Mendez (Willy Fontana remix)
- Released: 2012
- Recorded: 2012
- Genre: Dance, Latin music
- Label: Scorpio Music
- Songwriters: Henry Antonio Méndez Reynoso; José Manuel León Hierro; Leopoldo Gonzalez Carro; Cristian Pino Moreno

"Te fuiste" is a bilingual Spanish-language and English language dance hit by Spanish music producer and DJ Jose de Rico and the Dominican-Spanish reggaeton, house, Latin and dance singer Henry Mendez. It is their debut joint chart hit.

"Te fuiste" became a big hit in Spanish night clubs and made it to #34 in the Spanish Singles Chart, and then became an international hit for them in Europe and internationally.

Track list

1. "Te fuiste" (original mix) (3:21)
2. "Te fuiste" (extended mix) (4:51)
3. "Te fuiste" (Willy Fontana remix) (3:40)

Chart performance

Year (2012)	Peak position
Spanish Singles Chart	34

== Willy Fontana remix ==
A remix by Willy Fontana released in November 2012 in France became a chart success on the SNEP chart, the official French Singles Chart.

Year (2012)	Peak position
SNEP French Singles Chart	62

== In popular culture ==
The song gained more publicity after the program Les Marseillais à Miami broadcast on the French television channel W9 used it as its theme song (générique) adding footage and additions to the track.
