= Zumba Fitness 2 =

2011 video game

Zumba Fitness 2 Zumba Fitness Rush
- Developer: Zoë Mode
- Publisher: Majesco
- Engine: In House
- Platforms: Wii, Xbox 360
- Release: Wii: NA: 15 November 2011; AU: 24 November 2011; EU: 25 November 2011; Xbox 360: NA: 13 February 2012; PAL: 24 February 2012
- Genre: Fitness game
- Modes: Single-player, Multiplayer

Zumba Fitness 2 is the second video game in the installment of the Fitness series, based on the Zumba program. It is also the sequel to Zumba Fitness (2010), later followed by Zumba Fitness Core (2012). Developed by Zoë Mode, it was published by Majesco. It was released first on the Wii in November 2011 and then on Kinect for Xbox 360 in February 2012 under the title Zumba Fitness Rush.

== Gameplay ==
Players can learn and perfect nine different dance styles: reggaeton, merengue, salsa, cumbia, hip hop, mambo, rumba, flamenco and calypso as well as new routines including the axé, Indian, Latin pop, bellydance and pasodoble, led by Zumba creator Beto and celebrity instructors Gina Grant and Tanya Beardsley. New features include a calorie tracker, revamped gameplay and graphical representations of the instructors.

== Soundtrack ==
The game uses licensed tracks for its soundtrack, which includes "Pause" by Pitbull as the game's theme song. Other songs for the game include a Zumba version of "Poison" by Nicole Scherzinger, and "We No Speak Americano" by Yolanda Be Cool & DCUP.

"Pause" is featured uncut on the Wii version, with the Kinect version using the edited "Zumba Mix" of the track. This was the reason for the "T" for Teen rating.

== Reception ==
The Xbox 360 version received mainly unfavorable reviews, most notably due to the lack of online multiplayer from Zumba Fitness.
