= Zumba Fitness (video game) =

2010 video game

- Developer: Pipeworks Software
- Publishers: Majesco; 505 Games
- Platforms: PlayStation 3, Wii, Xbox 360
- Release: NA: November 18, 2010; EU: November 26, 2010
- Genre: Fitness game
- Modes: Single-player, multiplayer

Zumba Fitness is a video game developed by Pipeworks Software and published by Majesco based on the Zumba program. It is available for Wii, PlayStation 3 with PlayStation Move, and Xbox 360 with Kinect. The Wii and PS3 versions come with a Zumba Belt where the Wii Remote or PlayStation Move motion controller is inserted into on the right hip. The game was released in November 2010.

== Gameplay ==
The game supports up to four players on Wii and PlayStation Move, up to two players on Kinect, locally, and up to eight players online on PlayStation Move and Kinect.

== Reception ==
After its release in 2010, Zumba Fitness faced mixed reviews from users and the fitness industry as a whole. Pieces of the game that is most enjoyed are the interactivity and entertainment aspects that keep users engaged. Other critics have positively reported it provides a sufficient method of exercise and a variety of lengthy, exciting routines for users to choose from. The routines were designed by a variety of professional Zumba instructors, so critics praise that they feel genuine and challenging when done correctly.

For its time in 2010, the ability to play with up to four players made the game exciting and allowed for the ability to play with friends. However there were many parts of the game and its interactivity that created poor reception. On the other side of users and critics opinion, the game faced lots of harsh feedback. Critics claim the faulty movement detection from the Xbox Kinect hindered the experience and made the results of the game far from accurate. Even when using the other option for the game, the Wii remote, critics claim that even the slightest movement too far caused them to select the wrong dance or time, and completely disrupted the experience. Users did not enjoy the lack of instruction for the movements and the fast pace for many of the dances, which led them to fall behind the movements and not achieve a complete workout. The interactivity was overall low, and was one of the main critiques from the gaming industry. Many users and critics argue you could get the same level workout by simply viewing a dance video and following along.

Seven months after its release the Zumba Fitness game stayed at number one on the charts for four weeks in a row, proving a level of success for the game and heavy interest in home fitness from the world. With that, the game was a positive influence for the fitness industry as it allowed those who did not enjoy typical exercise to find a fun source of movement. Differing from the typical gaming audience, Zumba was most successful with the over 25 year old age demographic. Zumba was well received with an older audience and led to high use from particularly the female demographic. A piece where Zumba’s positive reception was especially impactful was the influence it had on users who did not consider themselves frequent exercisers. Users who did not frequently exercise reported to have the best reception to the game and considered it a sound exercise option.

== Sequel ==
Due to successful sales of the game, Majesco announced a second game for the Wii which was released on November 15, 2011. The second game adds music tracks by popular artists such as Pitbull and Nicole Scherzinger.

== Instructors ==
Gina, Tanya and Beto are the Zumba Fitness Instructors. Gina for the Beginner Level, Tanya for the Intermediate Levels, and Beto for the Expert Levels and the Zumbathon.
