= Fiesta Buena (album) =

Studio album by DJ Mam's with Various artists
- Released: 1 October 2012
- Recorded: 2011–2012
- Label: Mam's Prod / Space Party; Wagram Music

Fiesta Buena is a multilingual album by French DJ of Algerian descent following his great success with "Zumba He Zumba Ha". The album contains songs using various languages: French, Spanish, Arabic and local North African dialects, creole, a French dialect spoken in Martinique and Guadeloupe. Most of the songs are written in collaboration between Mounir Belkhir, Luis Guisao and Soldat Jahman.

It was released on 1 October 2012 with DJ Mam's own record label Mam's Prod and by Space Party, with exclusive licence for distribution to Wagram Music.

== Artists ==
Producer DJ Mam's collaborated in these recordings with a great number of artists.

Major collaborations

Name of artist	No. of tracks	Tracks
Doukali	7	1, 4, 5, 7, 9, 11, 12, 14
Luis Guisao	5	3, 4, 6, 8, 15
Soldat Jahman	4	1, 3, 6, 12

Other artists (in alphabetical order)

Name of artist	No. of tracks	Tracks
Halim	1	"Ghorba"
Ilhem	1	"Fichta Night"
Imène Eva	1	"Regret"
Jessy Matador	1	"Zumba He Zumba Ha (Remix 2012)"
Lynn	1	"Sexy Mami"
Naro	1	"Envie de partir"
Rania	2	"Toi et moi" "Regret"
Samia	1	"Mes rêves"
Sofal-K	1	"Fichta Night"
Staff Jabbar	1	"Taxi"
Youcef	1	"Savonne"
Zino	1	"Ghorba"

== Track listing ==
Track No.	Song title	Performer	Length
1	"Hella décalé"	DJ Mam's feat. Soldat Jahman & Doukali	3:54
2	"Fichta Night"	DJ Mam's feat. Sofal-K & Ilhem	3:04
3	"Zumba He Zumba Ha"	DJ Mam's feat. Soldat Jahman & Luis Guisao	3:19
4	"Zina Morena"	DJ Mam's feat. Luis Guisao & Doukali	3:34
5	"Toi et moi"	DJ Mam's feat. Doukali & Rania	3:25
6	"Fiesta Buena"	DJ Mam's feat. Luis Guisao & Soldat Jahman	3:11
7	"Savonne"	DJ Mam's feat. Doukali & Youcef	5:10
8	"Sexy Mami"	DJ Mam's feat. Luis Guisao & Lynn	3:00
9	"Envie de partir"	DJ Mam's feat. Naro & Doukali	3:15
10	"Ghorba"	DJ Mam's feat. Zino & Halim Chiba	3:47
11	"Mes rêves"	DJ Mam's feat. Samia & Doukali	3:23
12	"Tonight"	DJ Mam's feat. Doukali & Soldat Jahman	3:12
13	"Regret"	DJ Mam's feat. Rania & Imène Eva	2:55
14	"Taxi"	DJ Mam's feat. Doukali & Staff Jabbar	5:49
15	"Zumba He Zumba Ha (Remix 2012)"	DJ Mam's feat. Jessy Matador & Luis Guisao	3:12

== Charts ==
Chart (2012)	Peak position
Ultratop Belgium Albums Chart (Wallonia)	106
SNEP French Albums Chart	92
