= Beto Pérez =

Colombian dancer and choreographer (born 1970)

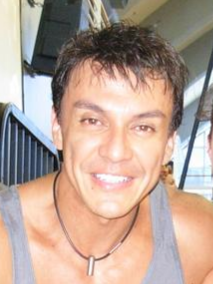
- Pérez in 2014
- Born: March 15, 1970 (age 56); Cali, Colombia
- Musical career
- Occupations: Dancer; choreographer; businessman; Zumba instructor
- Instruments: Vocals
- Website: betoperez.zumba.com

Alberto "Beto" Pérez (born 15 March 1970) is a Colombian dancer, choreographer, businessman, and Zumba instructor. He created the exercise fitness program Zumba in the late 1990s which involves dance and aerobic exercise elements with accompanying music, specifically Latin, and associated martial arts moves, squats, lunges, and other aerobic techniques.

== Early life and education ==
Pérez was raised in Cali, Colombia, by a single mother and was working three jobs by age 14 to support his family. His passion was dancing, but he could not afford dance lessons. After he won a national lambada contest in Colombia, he was accepted to one of Cali's best academies to study dance while he taught step aerobics in return.

== Business ==
In 1999, Pérez moved to Miami, Florida "in search of the American Dream". Besides teaching aerobics classes, he tried to promote his fitness and dance routines with music at numerous venues. In 2001, Beto asked Williams Island fitness director (Brenda Anderson) to take a chance on promoting his dance routines in a class at the center. In 2003 after his first infomercial and with financial and technical assistance from Alberto Perlman and Alberto Aghion, workshops resulted that were based on Zumba routines. His routines, initially distributed as DVDs, gained momentum that resulted in an international following.

In 2006 Pérez established Zumba Fitness LLC, an organization that sells Zumba videos and products and charges licensing fees to its network of instructors (ZIN™ – Zumba Instructors' Network). It employs more than 200 employees. An estimated 14 million people across more than 160,000 locations in 185 countries participate in Zumba, performing dance-based exercise routines to music primarily provided by the company.

Zumba Fitness has also released its fashion line of Zumbawear. The company manufactures Zumbawear for age-specific groups, including seniors, mothers and children. Besides the general Zumba Fitness brand, fashion lines include styles for Zumba Toning, Aqua Zumba, Zumba Sentao, Zumba Gold, Zumba Gold-Toning, Zumba Kids and Zumba Kids Jr, Zumba Step and Strong By Zumba. Its instruction programs are popular in community centers, youth activity centers, tourist venues, schools and retirement communities, among other venues.

== Personal life ==
On the eve of March 15, 2020, his 50th birthday, Pérez announced on his Facebook page that his daughter Antonella had been born on January 11, 2020.

== Music ==
Through his Zumba Fitness routines, Pérez promotes music and musical artists associated with Zumba, which positively affects musical success for artists in various Latin music genres. An Associated Press article states that the Zumba movement has created an international fan base for Latin music, citing acts including Pitbull, Don Omar and Daddy Yankee. Daddy Yankee's "Limbo" shouts out for Zumba several times in the lyrics. Pitbull, Wyclef Jean and other stars have taken part in Zumba Fitness conventions. Other Zumba fans include Jennifer Lopez and Shakira.

Zumba Fitness has released a series of music albums including Zumba Fitness Dance Party with music for Zumba classes worldwide. Pérez has collaborated with the Colombian Latin star Mara (full name Mara Prada), with whom he has a hit "Crazy Love" credited to Prada featuring Pérez. Prada, Haitian singer J. Perry and American singer Dahrio Wonder were named Zumba Fitness Emerging Artists. A similar collaboration has developed with the well-established Brazilian star Claudia Leitte particularly after the adaptation of "Largadinho" to Zumba moves. An English translation was also included as "Lazy Groove." Leitte has become the international ambassador to Zumba Fitness. Pérez was also featured as a "special guest" in "Fiesta Buena", a hit by DJ Mam's that also featured Luis Guisao and Soldat Jahman. The single charted in France and Belgium, following DJ Mam's international hit "Zumba He Zumba Ha".

== Discography ==
=== Singles ===
==== Featured in ====
Year	Single	Peak position		Album	Music videos
Year	Single	FR	BEL (Wa)	Album	Music videos
2012	"Fiesta Buena" (DJ Mam's feat. Luis Guisao & Soldat Jahman and special guest Beto Pérez)	12	50	DJ Mam's album Fiesta Buena	
