= Soldat Jahman =

French hip hop artist originating from the Martinique

- Also known as: Jahman, Jah-Man
- Born: 1979 (age 46–47)
- Origin: French singer of Martinique origin
- Genres: Ragga, Zumba
- Occupations: Singer, songwriter
- Years active: 2001 – present

Soldat Jahman also known as Jah-Man or Jahman, (born in 1979) is a French ragga hip hop artist originating from the Martinique combining also various influences like reggaeton and rap.

Based in Marseille, he was part of the Ghetto Boyz Club (G.B.C. a.k.a. B-O-G). Soldat Jahman also cooperates closely with DJ Mam's and is part of DJ Mam's music collectif 123 Marseille. He is famous for his singles "Boogie Dance", "My Sexy Lady" and "Bolide". In 2013, he released "Sexy Bam Bam" as a duo with Luis Guisao.

Soldat Jahman is featured on many of DJ Mam's tracks, most notably in the original version of "Zumba He Zumba Ha", but also in "Hella décalé", "Tonight" and the title track "Fiesta Buena" of DJ Mam's album of the same name. In 2012, he was also featured in Mika V. single "Danza en la Playa" alongside Luis Guisao.

== Discography ==
=== Singles ===
- 2010: "Hella Décalé"
- 2011: "Zumba He Zumba Ha"
- 2011: "Boogie Dance"
- 2011: "Bolide"
- 2012: "Fiesta Buena"
- 2013: "Sexy Bam Bam" (with Luis Guisao)
- 2014: "Dale Feat. Kenza Farah"
- 2014: "Que Bonita"

Featured in singles

Year	Single	Peak position		Album	Music videos
Year	Single	FR	BEL (Wa)	Album	Music videos
2009	"Hella Décalé" (DJ Mam's feat. Doukali & Soldat Jahman)	–	–	Fiesta Buena	
2011	"Zumba He Zumba Ha" (DJ Mam's feat. Soldat Jahman & Luis Guisao)	192	–	Fiesta Buena	
2012	"Fiesta Buena" (DJ Mam's feat. Luis Guisao & Soldat Jahman & Beto Perez)	12	50	Fiesta Buena	
2013	"Danza en la Playa" (Mika V. feat. Soldat Jahman & Luis Guisao)	–	–		
