= Jay Santos =

- Born: Colombia
- Genres: Latin, house, reggaeton, dance
- Occupation: Singer
- Label: Blanco y Negro Music

Jay Santos is a Colombian vocalist and singer of electro house dance music and reggaeton. He is signed to Spain's Blanco y Negro Music record label.

Santos rose to fame when he was featured in the European dance hit "Noche de estrellas" by Spanish DJ and producer Jose De Rico and Dominican singer Henry Mendez. It reached number 5 in the Spanish Singles Chart also charting in France. Based on that success, Jay Santos released his solo hit "Caliente" with chart success in Spain, France and Belgium.

== Discography ==
Solo singles

List of singles, with selected chart positions
Year	Title	Peak chart positions					Certifications	Album
Year	Title	SPA	BEL (Vl)	BEL (Wa)	FRA	SWI	Certifications	Album
2013	"Caliente"	32	29	29	36	12		

Featured in

List of singles, with selected chart positions
Year	Title	Peak chart positions			Certifications	Album
Year	Title	SPA	BEL (Wa)	FRA	Certifications	Album
2012	"Noche de estrellas" (Jose de Rico & Henry Mendez feat. Jay Santos)	5	–	157		
