= 123 Marseille =

- Origin: Marseille, France
- Genres: Various genres and languages
- Years active: 2009 – present
- Members: DJ Mam's; Mounir Belkhir; Doukali; Ilhem; Imène Eva; Luis Guisao; Lynn; Naro; Rania; Samia; Sofal-K; Soldat Jahman; Staff Jabbar; Youcef Zino
- Website: www.123marseille.com

123 Marseille or Collectif 123 Marseille is a Marseille-based French multicultural music collective established in 2009 through an initiative of DJ Mam's (Morad Mameri) and by Mounir Belkhir. It initially include six singers and musicians. The collective has expanded since then.

It incorporates various music trends and multicultural aspects Marseille culture represents and members and releases are promoted through the Collectif own website 123marseille.com and has grown to include even more musicians, producers, songwriters is an impressive mixture of singing artists from France, Algeria, Morocco, Senegal and elsewhere incorporating French Marseille music, Mediterranean, African, Latin and Oriental Arab sounds, disco, pop, rap, funk, and using various world music influences and trends. The collectif is also multilingual in its various releases using French, Spanish, English, Arabic language and North African dialects and African languages. It also uses creole languages relating to Andalusia as well as creoles related to Martinique and Guadeloupe and elsewhere.

Most of the songs are produced by Mounir Belkhir and DJ Mam's himself. Many of the songs are tried out live to see how well they are received prior to inclusion in studio releases.

== Members ==
123 Marseille presently includes:

- DJ Mam's
- Mounir Belkhir
- Doukali
- Ilhem
- Imène Eva
- Luis Guisao
- Lynn
- Naro
- Rania
- Samia
- Sofal-K
- Soldat Jahman
- Staff Jabbar
- Youcef Zino
