= The Raine Group =

American investment and merchant banking firm

The Raine Group LLC
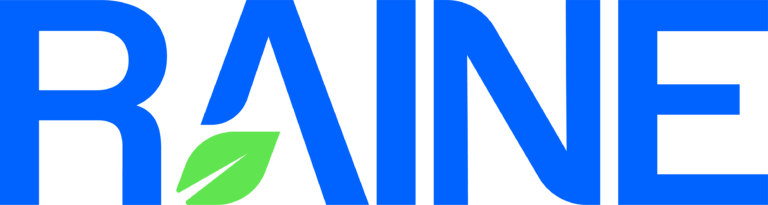
- Type: Private
- Industry: Financial services
- Founded: September 2009; 16 years ago
- Founders: Joseph Ravitch; Jeffrey Sine
- Headquarters: Park Avenue Tower, New York, U.S.
- Products: Investment banking Merchant banking
- AUM: US$3.8 billion (2023)
- Number of employees: 175 (2023)
- Website: www.raine.com

The Raine Group, commonly referred to as Raine, is a global merchant bank focused exclusively on industries related to technology, media and telecommunications (TMT). Companies the firm has been involved with significantly include Endeavor, SoftBank Group, WWE and Ultimate Fighting Championship. It has also been involved with several Premier League football clubs.

Outside the U.S., the firm has offices in Europe and Asia.

== Background ==
In September 2009, Raine was co-founded by Joseph Ravitch and Jeffrey Sine. Ravitch was previously co-head of Goldman Sachs' media banking division while Sine was Vice Chairman and head of TMT banking at UBS. It was compared to the early formation of the Quadrangle Group which also had a TMT focus. The firm's name Raine comes from an amalgamation of Ravitch's and Sine's surnames with the "e" on the end coming from Ari Emanuel, an initial backer who headed William Morris Endeavor. One of Raine's first major deals was advising William Morris Agency on its merger with Endeavor Talent Agency to form William Morris Endeavor.

In March 2010, Mubadala Investment Company acquired a 9% stake of Raine. Raine would also enter an exclusive relationships with William Morris Endeavor and Theodore J. Forstmann as investors. SoftBank Group also holds a small stake of Raine.

In April 2023, Raine acquired Code Advisors, a San Francisco-based boutique investment bank that also focuses on TMT. It was done as the two had already worked together on a number of deals for the same clients.

Sources state that Sine is more active on the advisory side while Ravitch is more active on the investment side.

== Business activities ==
=== Advisory ===
Raine provides investment banking advisory services to companies in the TMT sector. Its business model follows Allen & Company where its deal-making contacts would give it exclusive access to prospective investments. Raine does not make many pitches for new business and instead prefers to focus on existing clients for repeat business.

Notable deals it has worked on include:

- Advising Playboy Enterprises on going private in March 2011
- Advising Softbank Group on acquiring Sprint Nextel in July 2013
- Advising Steve Ballmer on acquiring the Los Angeles Clippers in August 2014
- Advising the sale of Legendary Entertainment to Wanda Group in March 2016
- Advising Ultimate Fighting Championship on its sale to WME-IMG in July 2016
- Advising Vince McMahon on the revival of XFL in 2020
- Advising on the merger of Sprint Corporation and T-Mobile US in 2020
- Advising Roman Abramovich on selling Chelsea F.C. to BlueCo in May 2022
- Advising on the merger between WWE and Ultimate Fighting Championship to form TKO Group Holdings on September 12, 2023
- Advising on the initial public offering of Arm Holdings that took place on September 14, 2023.

=== Investments ===
In September 2010, Raine released a letter to its investors that it had raised more than $300 million for its first private equity fund that would focus on investing in media companies. Its backers included William Morris Endeavor, Forstmann, Masayoshi Son and sovereign wealth funds of China, Singapore and Abu Dhabi. By April 2011, the fund had raised close to $500 million with additional backers that included WPP plc, Frank and Lorenzo Fertitta, Eric Schmidt, Sean Parker, Terry Semel, Richard Rosenblatt and Marc Andreessen.

Notable investments that Raine has made include Vice Media, DraftKings, Jagex and SoundCloud.
