= Rayos de sol =

- Cover of Spanish single release

Single by Jose de Rico featuring Henry Mendez
- Released: 18 June 2012
- Recorded: 2012
- Genre: merengue, electro house
- Label: Roster Music
- Songwriters: José de Rico, Henry Mendez

Jose de Rico featuring Henry Mendez singles chronology
"Te fuiste" (2012)	"Rayos de sol" (2012)	"Noche de estrellas" (2012)

Music video
- "Rayos de sol" on YouTube

"Rayos de sol" is a Spanish-language dance hit by Spanish music producer and DJ Jose de Rico featuring the Dominican-Spanish reggaeton, house, Latin and dance singer Henry Mendez. It follows the success of their joint Spanish hit "Te fuiste".

"Rayos de sol" became a big hit in Spain reaching #2 in the Spanish Singles Chart, and then became an international hit for them in Europe and internationally with chart appearances notably in France and Switzerland.

According to PROMUSICAE, the publisher of the Official Spanish Singles and Albums Charts, "Rayos de sol" was the third biggest single in Spain in 2012.

== Track list ==
1. "Rayos de sol" (original mix)
2. "Rayos de sol" (extended version)

== Chart performance ==
=== Weekly charts ===
Chart (2012)	Peak position
Austria (Ö3 Austria Top 40)	11
Belgium (Ultratop 50 Flanders)	10
Belgium (Ultratop 50 Wallonia)	16
France (SNEP)	4
Luxembourg (Billboard)	6
Spain (Promusicae)	2
Switzerland (Schweizer Hitparade)	8

=== Year-end charts ===
Chart (2012)	Position
Belgium (Ultratop Flanders)	88
Switzerland (Schweizer Hitparade)	40
