= Noche de estrellas =

Single by Jose de Rico & Henry Mendez featuring Jay Santos
- Released: May 2012
- Recorded: 2012
- Genre: Reggaeton, electro house
- Label: Roster Music

Jose de Rico & Henry Mendez featuring Jay Santos singles chronology
"Rayos de sol" (2012)	"Noche de estrellas" (2012)	"Mi reina" (2013)

Music video
- "Noche de estrellas" on YouTube

"Noche de estrellas" is a Spanish-language dance hit by Spanish music producer and DJ Jose de Rico and Dominican-Spanish reggaeton, house, Latin and dance singer Henry Mendez featuring Jay Santos. It follows the success of their joint Spanish hit "Rayos de sol".

"Noche de estrellas" was released in May 2012 on Roster Music and became a hit in Spain reaching #26 in the Spanish Singles Chart.

== Track list ==
- "Noche de Estrellas" – original mix
- "Noche de Estrellas" – extended mix
- "Noche de Estrellas" – radio edit
- "Noche de Estrellas" – instrumental mix

== Chart performance ==
Year (2012)	Peak position
Spanish Singles Chart	5
SNEP French Singles Chart	157
