= DJ Mam's =

French DJ of Algerian descent

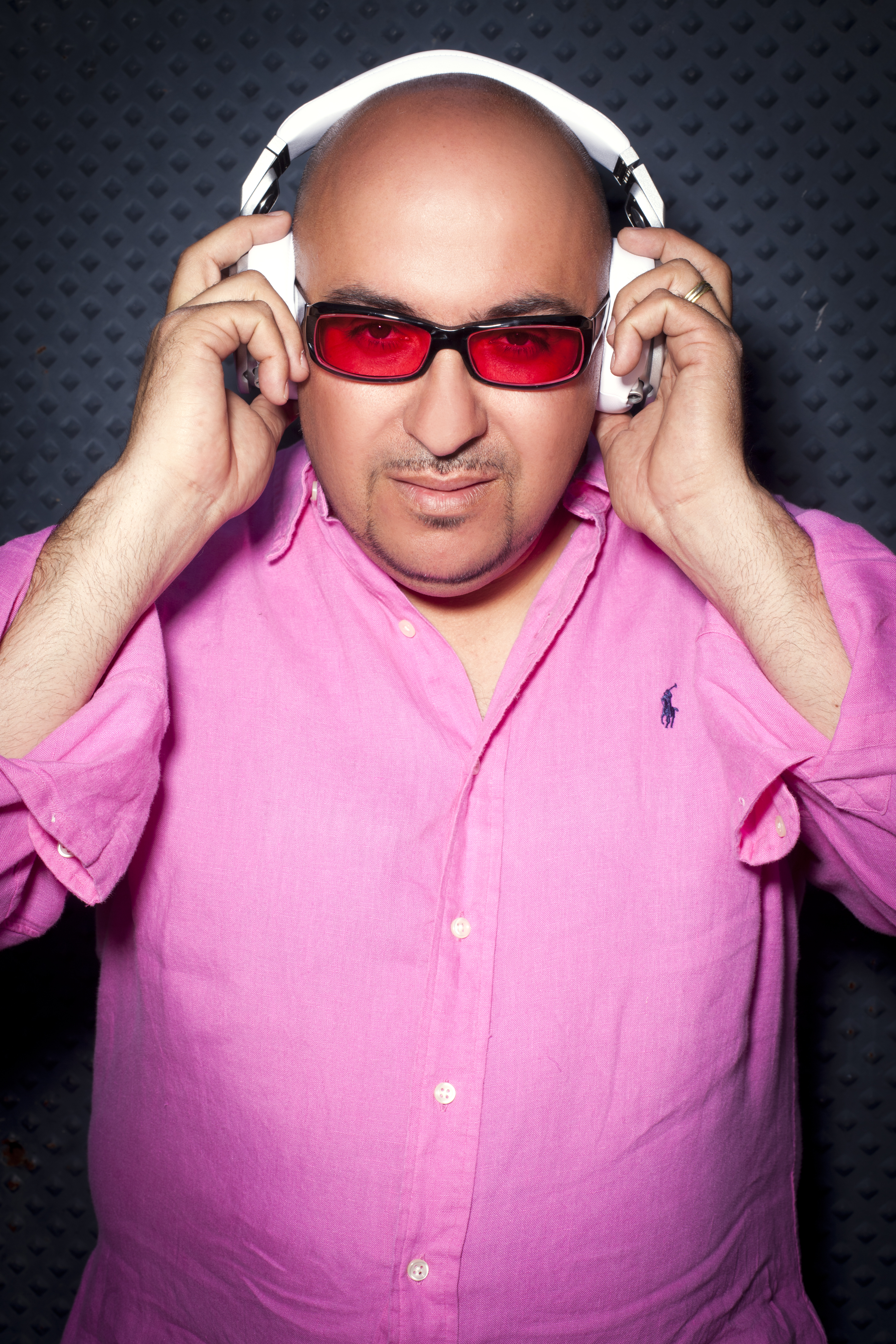
- DJ Mam's in 2012

Background information
- Born: Morad Mameri; 1972 (age 53–54); Marseille, France
- Origin: French of Algerian descent
- Genres: Various
- Occupations: Disc jockey Record producer
- Instrument: Turntable
- Years active: 1989 – present
- Label: Wagram label
- Website: www.123marseille.com

Morad Mameri better known by his stage name DJ Mam's born in Marseille, France, in 1972 is a Marseille-based French DJ of Algerian descent. He is signed to Wagram music label.

== Career ==
Mameri was born in Marseille to Algerian immigrants and started playing at immigrant community events. In 2007, he released his first album Mam's Mix Party and was active in organizing many music events.

== Collectif 123 Marseille ==
In 2009, DJ Mam's turned his attention to incorporating various music trends Marseille culture represented and the result was his founding of Collectif 123 Marseille.

== Discography ==
=== Albums ===
Year	Album	Peak position		Certification
Year	Album	FR	BEL (Wa)	Certification
2012	Fiesta Buena: Release date: 1 October 2012; Record Labels: Mam's Prod / Space Party under exclusive licence to Wagram Music	92	106	

=== Singles ===
Year	Single	Peak position			Album	Music videos
Year	Single	FR	BEL (Vl)	BEL (Wa)	Album	Music videos
2009	"Hella Décalé" (feat. Doukali & Soldat Jahman)	–	–	–	Fiesta Buena	
2011	"Zumba He Zumba Ha" (feat. Soldat Jahman & Luis Guisao)	192	–	–	Fiesta Buena	
2011	"Zina Morena" (feat. Luis Guisao & Doukali)	–	–	–	Fiesta Buena	
2012	"Zumba He Zumba Ha (Remix 2012)" (feat. Jessy Matador & Luis Guisao)	7	42 (Ultratip)	17	Fiesta Buena	
2012	"Fiesta Buena" (feat. Luis Guisao & Soldat Jahman and special guest Beto Perez)	12	–	50	Fiesta Buena	
2013	"Hella Décalé Remix 2013" (feat. Tony Gomez & Ragga Ranks)	83	–	34* (Ultratip)	Non-album release	
2014	"Mi corazón" (feat. Tony Gomez & Lynn)	28	–	25* (Ultratip)	Non-album release	
2017	"Tranquilo" (feat. Houssdjo & Luis Guisao)	–	–	–	Non-album release	

*Did not appear in the official Belgian Ultratop 50 charts, but rather in the bubbling under Ultratip charts.
