= Henry Méndez =

Dominican singer

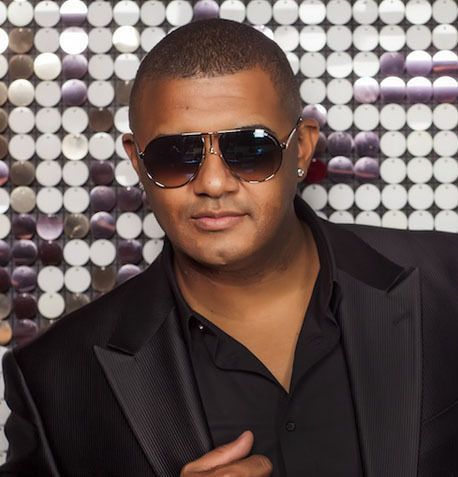

Background information
- Born: Henry Antonio Méndez Reynoso; 7 November 1974 (age 52); Dominican Republic
- Genres: Reggaeton; pop; latin; merengue
- Occupation: Singer
- Instrument: Vocals
- Years active: 2002–present
- Labels: Flimax Music; Asere Music International; Universal Dancehall Music; Roster Music; Farandula Records

Henry Antonio Méndez Reynoso (born 7 November 1974) is a Dominican singer. He is known for solo hits and collaborations with various artists. He rose to fame after his collaboration with Spanish DJ and producer Jose de Rico which launched him internationally with dance hits like "Te fuiste", "Rayos de sol", and "Noche de estrellas".

His renditions have been included in several Latin dance compilations and his songs are played in Europe, Latin America and internationally. He is signed to Flow Records BCN label.

== Career ==
Born in Santo Domingo, Méndez was interested in music and dance very early as a child and as a teenager performing at various locations with youth groups. He immigrated to Spain residing in the district of Sant Pere, Tordera near Barcelona, where he began a music career professionally with collaborations especially with the singer and friend OPB (Ollantay Pérez Betancourt).

In 2002, he founded his own "Latino Way" record label with a record deal with Filmax Music, launching on a big tour of more than 100 dates throughout Spain, creating a fan base. He appeared with well-known Spanish artists like David DeMaría, David Bustamante, Chenoa, Guaraná, Presuntos Implicados amongst others. Songs from this period include "Sigue Bailando", "Mami", "Yo soy tu maestro" and "Ven" achieving good sales throughout his tour. His songs were also included in various hit compilations like El Disco de Reggaeton 02 (Vale Music), Caribe Mix (Blanco y Negro Music), El Megatón (Filmax Music) and La Factoria del Reggaeton (Metropol Records) etc.

With increasing appeal of dancehall music internationally, Méndez signed with Sony BMG in Spain for launching urban dancehall sounds and early 2008 created his own independent label in partnership with Ollantay Pérez releasing songs like "Yo Sí Soy de Barrio", "Traigo Candela" and others alongside music videos for the releases for better exposure on music channels in Spain. He also branched with his friend Ollantay Pérez Betancourt to Sheneal Records led by Carlos López da Silva with renowned music video producer Eklipse. He also managed to forge collaborations with other Dominican and regional Spanish performers throughout his tours with OPB with titles like "La sonrisa del gato", "Chica tentadora" and "Fuego pasión". He also increasingly adopted European disco sounds for wider appeal, without forgetting the Latin American markets, where he toured initially with Ecuadorian rapper and reggaetone act Rude School. His releases became increasingly popular in Latin America (Ecuador, Colombia, Chile) and as far as Cuba in addition to his homeland, the Dominican Republic.

=== National and international fame ===
2011 saw a huge increase in popularity of Henry Méndez after signing with Roster Music, a big name in Spanish dance music and collaboration with Spanish DJ and music producer José de Rico. The release of "Te fuiste" (credited to José de Rico and Henry Méndez) resulted in a huge commercial appeal and dance hit specially with the catchy music video launched for the song. Almost simultaneously the dance hit "Rayos de sol" (credited to Jose de Rico featuring Henry Méndez) was launched reaching number 2 in Spain and an international hit charting in Austria, Belgium, France, Germany and Switzerland. It became the third best selling single in Spain in 2012. A third 2012 big hit in the series of Mendez international hits came with "Noche de estrellas" (credited to José de Rico & Henry Méndez featuring Jay Santos).

Henry Méndez has continued to enjoy commercial success with his solo single "Mi reina" that reached number 5 in Spanish PROMUSICAE Singles Chart and the follow-up "El tiburón (The Shark)", a remake of a popular merengue tune by Proyecto Uno.

== Discography ==
=== Singles ===
List of singles, with selected chart positions
Year	Title	Peak chart positions								Certifications	Album
Year	Title	AUT	BEL (Vl)	BEL (Wa)	FRA	GER	SPA	SWI	VE	Certifications	Album
2012	"Te fuiste" (Jose de Rico & Henry Mendez)	—	—	—	62	—	34	—	—		
2012	"Rayos de sol" (Jose de Rico feat. Henry Mendez)	11	10	16	4	21	2	8	—	Gold (SPAIN) (3rd best selling single in 2012 in Spain)	
2012	"Noche de estrellas" (Jose de Rico & Henry Mendez feat. Jay Santos)	—	—	—	157	—	5	—	—	(SPAIN) (43rd best selling single in 2012 in Spain)	
2013	"Mi reina" (Henry Mendez)	—	7	—	—	—	5	—	—		
2013	"El tiburón (The Shark)" (Henry Mendez)	—	—	—	—	—	9	—	—		
2014	"No Regresa Más" (Henry Mendez & Dulce María)	—	—	—	—	—	37	—	29		
2015	"Ela Ta Demais" (Henry Mendez feat. Wender Kremer)	—	—	—	—	—	26	—	—		

Other Releases

- "Veo veo (Chekete, chekete)"
- "Chica tentadora" (Henry Méndez feat. Fran & OPB & Sheneal)
- "El bombero" (OPB & Méndez feat. Michael Chacón)
- "El Masaje" (Henry Mendez feat. Dr. Bellido & Mr R Rommel)
- "La Taza" (Henry Mendez & OPB)
- "La Taza" (Special Edit) (Henry Mendez, Dr. Bellido & Roger G)
- "Pukutu" (Henry Mendez feat. Dr. Bellido & Mr R Rommel)

Featured in

- "Rayos de sol" (Jose de Rico feat. Henry Mendez)
- "Silanena" (Jose AM feat. Henry Mendez)
- "Shake It" (BPM King feat. Méndez & OPB)
- "Subete La Falda" (Robbie Moroder feat Henry Mendez)
- "Mami" (Robbie Moroder feat Henry Mendez)
- "Noche de estrellas" (Jose de Rico feat Henry Mendez & Jay Santos)
