= Luis Guisao =

French singer

Luis Guisao is a Marseille-based singer who grew up in St Henri, a village neighborhood of mainly Andalusian gypsies near L'Estaque and Marseille. Self-trained guitar and piano player, he composed songs for a 6-member music formation he formed called Salsa Flamenca, when he was just 16, specializing in Latin and flamenco tunes.

== Discography ==
Featured in singles

Year	Single	Peak position			Certification	Album	Music videos
Year	Single	BEL (Vl)	BEL (Wa)	FR	Certification	Album	Music videos
2011	"Zumba He Zumba Ha" (DJ Mam's feat. Soldat Jahman & Luis Guisao)	–	–	192		Fiesta Buena	
2011	"Zina Morena" (DJ Mam's feat. Luis Guisao & Doukali)	–	–	–		Fiesta Buena	
2012	"Zumba He Zumba Ha (Remix 2012)" (DJ Mam's feat. Jessy Matador & Luis Guisao)	42 (Ultratip)	1 (Ultratip); 17 (Ultratop)	7		Fiesta Buena	
2012	"Fiesta Buena" (DJ Mam's feat. Luis Guisao, Soldat Jahman & Beto Perez)	–	50	12		Fiesta Buena	
2013	"Sexy Bam Bam" (Luis Guisao, Soldat Jahman)	–	–	–		Latino Kreyol	
2013	"Danza en la Playa" (Mika V. feat. Soldat Jahman & Luis Guisao)	–	–	–		Latino Kreyol	
2013	"Dalé" (Soldat Jahman & Luis Guisao feat Kenza Farah)	–	–	–		Latino Kreyol	
2017	"Tranquilo" (DJ Mam's feat. Houssdjo & Luis Guisao)	–	–	–			
