= José de Rico =

Spanish DJ, producer and songwriter (born 21 April 1982)

- Born: José Manuel León Hierro; 27 December 1982 (age 43); Barcelona, Catalonia, Spain
- Genres: Mambo, Reggaeton, Electro latino, Latín House, Urbano Latino, Pop
- Years active: 2009–present
- Label: Roster Music
- Website: www.josedericoyhenrymendez.com

José Manuel León Hierro (born 27 December 1982, Barcelona), known as José de Rico, is a Spanish DJ, record producer and songwriter.

== Biography ==
He worked in the Spanish electronic and dance music station Loca FM for 5 years gaining media coverage and a big following. He started producing his own music in 2009. He is affiliated with "Roster Music", with whom he has collaborated with a number of artists locally in Spain and internationality. He has mixed more than 100 tracks since 2009 and has taken part in many music festivals.

His fame and international recognition increased after collaboration with Dominican reggaeton, house, Latin and dance act Henry Mendez with two charting hits "Te fuiste", "Rayos de sol" and "Noche de estrellas", hits in Spain and eventually internationally. According to PROMUSICAE, "Rayos de sol" was the third biggest single in Spain in 2012. According to the same year-end chart, "Noche de estrellas" was the 43rd best selling single.

== Discography ==
=== Singles ===
List of singles, with selected chart positions
Year	Title	Peak chart positions						Certifications	Album
Year	Title	SPA	AUT	BEL (Vl)	BEL (Wa)	FRA	SWI	Certifications	Album
2012	"Te fuiste" (José de Rico & Henry Mendez)	34	—	—	—	62	—		
2012	"Rayos de sol" (José de Rico feat. Henry Mendez)	2	11	10	16	4	8	Gold (SPAIN) (3rd best selling single in 2012 in Spain)	
2012	"Noche de estrellas" (José de Rico & Henry Mendez feat. Jay Santos)	5	—	—	—	157	—	(SPAIN) (43rd best selling single in 2012 in Spain)	
2013	"Sientelo" (José de Rico)	41	—	—	—	—	—		
2014	"Soltera" (José de Rico feat. Danny Romero & Fito Blanko)	—	—	—	—	—	—		
2015	"Mas que una amiga" (José de Rico feat. Adrián Rodríguez)	—	—	—	—	—	—		
2015	"Darte" (José de Rico & Danny Romero)	—	—	—	—	—	—		
2016	"Chocobongo" (José de Rico & Henry Mendez)	—	—	—	—	—	—		
2016	"Que te aguante otro" (José de Rico feat. Fito Blanko & D'William)	—	—	—	—	—	—		
2016	"Bésame" (José de Rico feat. Lucia Gil)	—	—	—	—	—	—		
2017	"Bailemos" (José de Rico feat. Crazy Design)	—	—	—	—	—	—		
2017	"Cupido" (José de Rico feat. Henry Mendez & Dani J)	—	—	—	—	—	—		

Featured in

List of singles, with selected chart positions
Year	Title	Peak chart positions	Certifications	Album
Year	Title	SPA	Certifications	Album
2013	"Si te vuelvo a ver" (DCS feat. José de Rico)	48		
2014	"Me gusta" (Dj R'AN feat. José de Rico, Willy William & Anna Tores)	—		
2014	"Si unas palabras bastan" (Andy & Lucas feat. José de Rico)	—		
2016	"Desnúdate" (Dani J feat. José de Rico)	—		
2017	"Una noche mas" (DaniRep X José de Rico)	—		

Other productions

(Selective)

- 2008: "Come with Me" - Iñaki Santos & Jose de Rico (remix)
- 2009: "Maiara" - Dario Nuñez & Jose de Rico
- 2009: "La Colegiala" - Corleone Brazini, Jason Tregebov & Jose de Rico
- 2009: "Bulgaria" - Miklov (Victor Magan & Jose de Rico remix)
- 2009: "Ready" - Josepo feat Adri (Victor Magan & Jose de Rico remix)
- 2009: "Una Rosa" - Juan Magan (Victor Magan & Jose de Rico remix)
- 2009: "Scratch" - Rafa Peralta (Jose de Rico)
- 2010: "Bata Bata" - Jason Tregebov & Jose de Rico (remix)
- 2010: "It's Worth It" (Jose de Rico feat. Estela Martin)
- 2010: "Eligibo" - Dario Nuñez feat. Samantha (Jose de Rico remix)
- 2010: "Let's Dance" - Victor Magan & Jason Tregebov feat Estela Martin (Jose de Rio & Gio Lopez remix)
- 2010: "Bocachica" - Jose de Rico feat. Fernando Vidal
- 2010: "Wekelee" - Dario Nuñez & Jose AM feat. Henry Mendez (Jose de Rico From Stars remix)
