= Zumba =

Dance fitness workout method

Zumba Fitness, LLC
- Industry: Fitness
- Founded: 2001
- Founder: Alberto "Beto" Pérez; Alberto Perlman; Alberto Aghion
- Number of locations: 186 countries
- Website: www.zumba.com

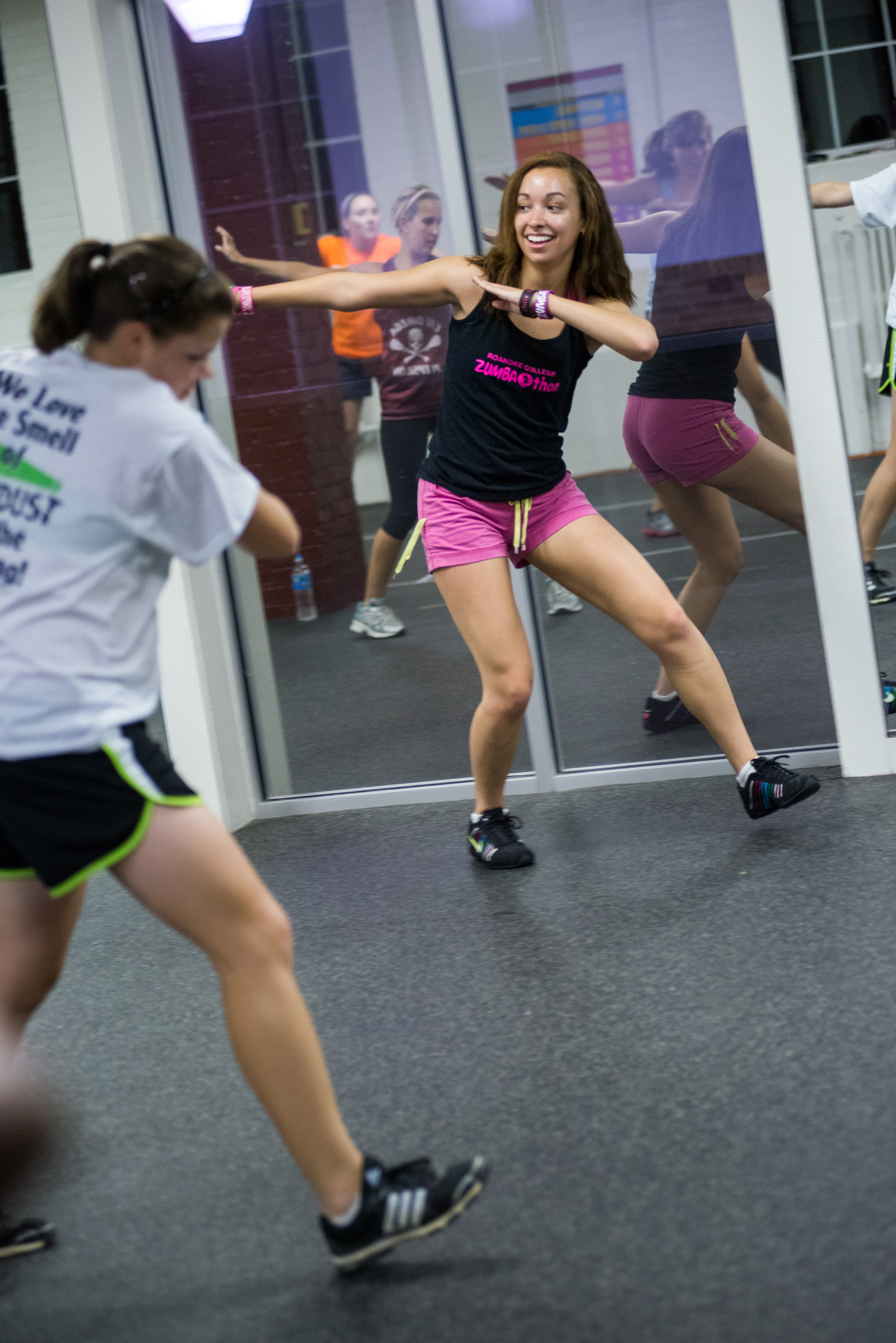
Zumba dancing at Roanoke College in the United States, 2012

Zumba is an aerobic fitness workout method created in Cali, Colombia, that combines cardio and Latin-inspired dance. It was founded by Colombian dancer and choreographer Beto Pérez in 2001. It currently has 200,000 locations, with 15 million people taking classes weekly, and is located in 180 countries. Zumba is a trademark owned by Zumba Fitness, LLC.

== Origin ==
Zumba was created in the 1990s by dancer and choreographer Beto Pérez, an aerobics instructor in Cali, Colombia. After forgetting his usual music one day, and using cassette tapes of Latin dance music (salsa and merengue) for class, Pérez began integrating the music and dancing into other classes, calling it "Rumbacize".

In 2001, Pérez partnered with Alberto Perlman and Alberto Aghion to launch Zumba, and the trio released a series of fitness videos sold via infomercial. Pérez decided on the word "Zumba" because of its similarity to the word "Rumba", the Cuban musical genre. Pérez and his partner began to replace the first letter of "rumba" until they landed on "sumba", and Pérez ultimately decided to spell it with the letter 'z' because he liked the fictional character Zorro when he was a child.

In 2012, Insight Venture Partners and The Raine Group invested in the venture. The company expanded into class instruction, and by 2015, according to Perlman, there were 14 million Zumba students in 186 countries.

== Choreography ==
Zumba choreography is composed using all or some of sixteen core steps. There are four basic rhythms: salsa, reggaeton, merengue, and cumbia; each basic rhythm has four core steps.

== Classes ==
Instructors are licensed by Zumba Fitness, LLC to teach classes.

There are eleven types of classes, for different ages and levels of exertion:

- Zumba — a mix of low and high intensity, interval-style moves.
- Zumba Step — a lower-body workout that incorporates Zumba routines and step aerobics with Latin dance rhythms.
- Zumba Toning — for people who do their workouts with toning sticks, targeting the abs, thighs, arms, and other muscles. This type of Zumba class provides participants with a cardio workout and strength training.
- Aqua Zumba — classes held in a swimming pool. The instructor leads the class poolside while participants follow in shallow water. The moves have been adapted to combine the dance movements used in a Zumba Fitness class with those used in aqua fitness classes. There is less impact on the joints, since it is in water, and natural resistance is created.
- Zumba Sentao — a combination of strength and resistance training, incorporating dance moves and a chair as your partner. It works your muscles and core without lifting weights.
- Zumba Gold — a modified, lower-intensity version of a typical Zumba class.
- Zumba Gold-Toning — a toning class designed for older participants with the goal of improving muscle strength, posture, mobility, and coordination.
- Zumba Kids (ages 7–11) & Zumba Kids Jr. (ages 4–6) — classes for kids that feature kid-friendly routines based on the original Zumba choreography, while also breaking down the steps and adding games and cultural exploration activities.
- Zumbini — a class for babies and children, ages of 0–4 years old and their caregivers to learn, bond, and grow in a musical environment. Their live classes stream on BabyFirstTV.
- Zumba in the Circuit — combines dance with circuit training. These classes usually last 30 minutes and feature strength exercises on various stations in timed intervals.
- A Plate by Zumba — an e-learning program to learn about healthy eating habits.

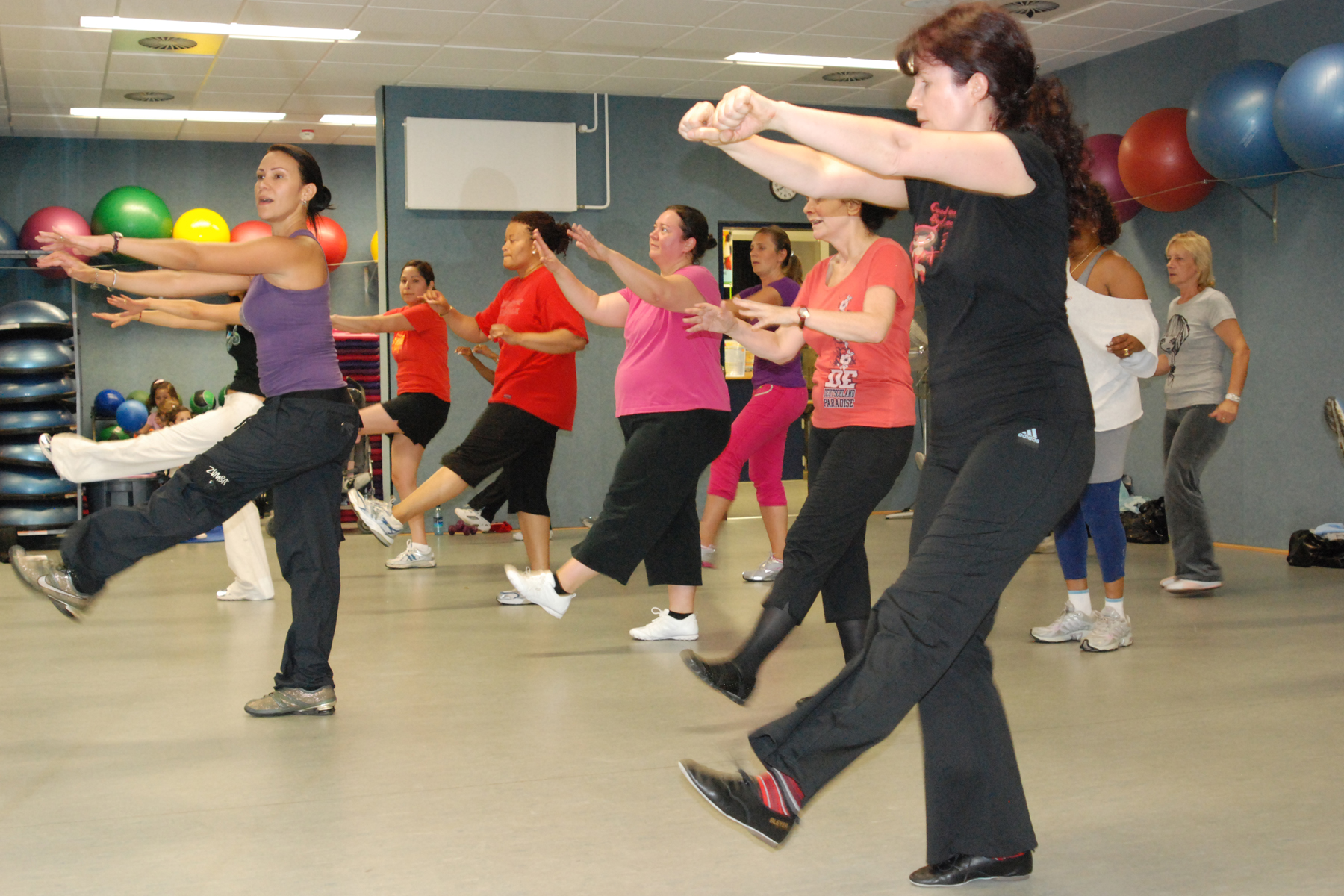
Zumba class held in a U.S. Army Garrison fitness center in Stuttgart, Germany, 2009

== Health benefits ==
Zumba is intended as a total-body cardio and aerobic workout, which provides calorie consumption. One 2012 study found that a participant burns 300 to 900 kcal with an hour-long Zumba exercise.

Because Zumba offers different options, proponents of the Zumba program claim that it is safe for all ages, meaning anyone can participate. Some of the classes are specifically aimed at elderly people.

Besides its high calorie burning, Zumba can help lower the risk of heart disease, reduce blood pressure and LDL cholesterol, and increase HDL cholesterol.

== Events ==
The annual ZIN-con for Zumba instructors from around the world takes place in the United States, including master classes, specialty training and a Zumba concert. In addition to the Annual Zumba Convention, Zumba also operates a number of one-day Academies where instructors can attend master classes and rhythm sessions. These events are held in cities globally. In January 2016, the first Zumba Cruise took place.

== Products ==
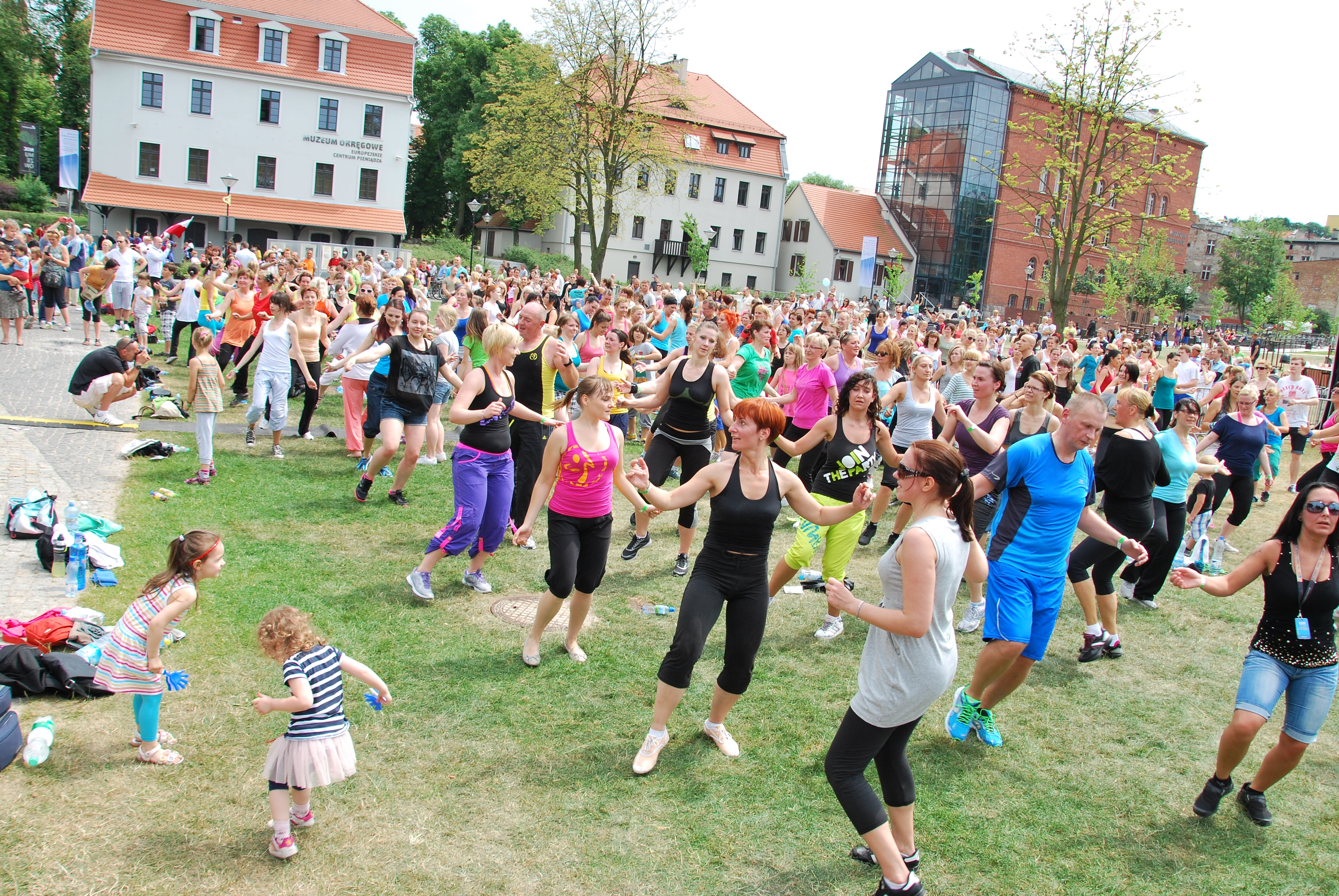
Attempted Zumba world record in Bydgoszcz, Poland, 2013

Zumba began selling DVDs via infomercials in 2002, selling more than 10 million DVDs by 2012.

In 2005, the Zumba Academy was launched to license instructors for teaching Zumba classes.

In 2007, the company launched a clothing line called Zumba Wear; as of 2012, official apparel sales amounted to $10 million per year.

In July 2012, Zumba released the compilation album Zumba Fitness Dance Party.

=== Video games ===
In 2010, Zumba released its first fitness video game—Zumba Fitness—on 30 November 2010 for the PlayStation 3 and Xbox 360 (on Epic Games' Unreal Engine 3), selling 3 million copies by August 2011. It was followed by Zumba Fitness 2, released in November 2011, with a similar game released on the Xbox 360 as Zumba Fitness Rush in February 2012. In October 2012, Zumba Fitness Core was released for the Wii and Xbox 360, including new features such as nutrition tips and the ability to set personal goals.

Zumba Fitness: World Party was released on 5 November 2013, featuring a new "World Tour" mode that unlocks songs from seven global destinations as a player progresses, as well as authentic customs, local rhythms and native dance styles. The game was followed a couple weeks later by Zumba Kids on 19 November 2013.

On 19 November 2019, Zumba Burn It Up! was released by 505 Games and Sega in Japan and certain countries (digital only) for the Nintendo Switch, as the first Zumba game in six years.

== Bans ==
In June 2017, Zumba was banned in Iran for being un-Islamic. The ban applies to all public and private gyms, clubs, and classes, and is enforced by the country’s sports federations and religious leaders. Instructors have faced arrests for teaching Zumba, and Zumba Fitness has revoked permits for instructors in Iran, citing both the ban and U.S. trade sanctions. In August 2017, six people were arrested after being accused of "trying to change lifestyles" by teaching Zumba. In 2013, the Rabbinical Court of the Ashkenazi Community in the Haredi settlement of Beitar Illit ruled against Zumba classes, although they were held with a female instructor and all-female participants. The Court said in part: "Both in form and manner, the activity [Zumba] is entirely at odds with both the ways of the Torah and the holiness of Israel, as are the songs associated to it."

== See also ==
- Hip hop
