= Things Change =

Things Change may refer to:

== Film and television ==
- Things Change (film), a 1988 comedy and drama film directed by David Mamet
- "Things Change" (TMNT 2003 Episode), an episode of Teenage Mutant Ninja Turtles

== Music ==
- "Things Change" (Dwight Yoakam song), a song by Dwight Yoakam from the 1988 album A Long Way Home
- "Things Change" (Petter Øien & Bobby Bare song), a song that competed to represent Norway in Eurovision 2012
- "Things Change" (Keke Wyatt song), a short interlude track by Keke Wyatt on her 2016 album Rated Love
- "Things Change" (Tim McGraw song), a song by Tim McGraw from the 2001 album Set This Circus Down

== See also ==
- The More Things Change (disambiguation)
- "Things Have Changed", a 2000 song by Bob Dylan
- "Things Have Changed" (Mattafix song), 2008
