= Marlon Roudette =

Vincentian born singer, songwriter, and record producer (born 1983)

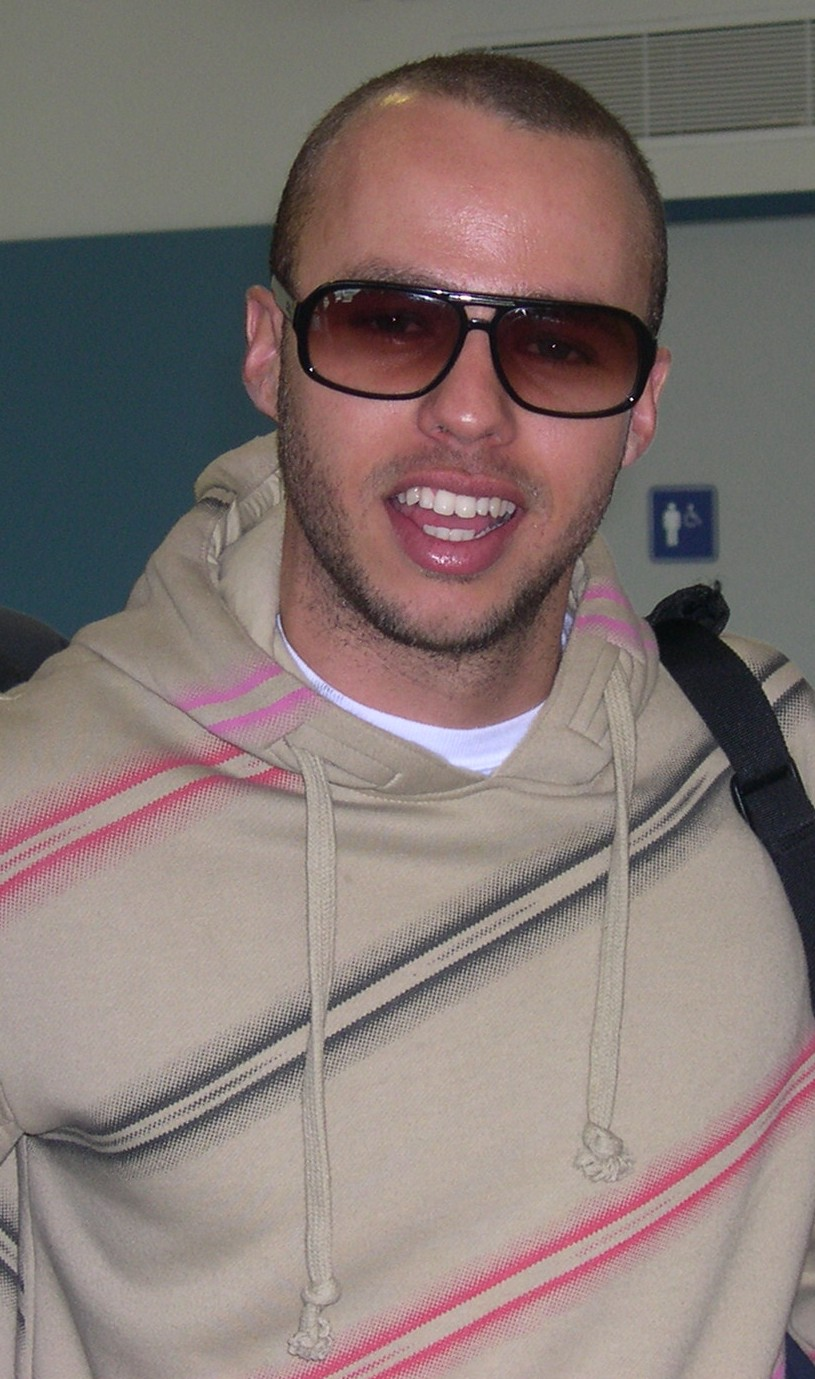
- Roudette in 2012

Background information
- Born: 5 January 1983 (age 43); London, England
- Origin: Saint Vincent and the Grenadines
- Genres: Hip hop; R&B; reggae fusion; electronic
- Occupations: Singer; songwriter; rapper; record producer
- Instruments: Steel drum, percussion, keyboards, guitar
- Years active: 2005–present
- Label: Universal Music
- Formerly of: Mattafix
- Website: marlonroudette.com

Marlon Roudette (born 5 January 1983) is an English singer, songwriter, and record producer. He is the former front man for the duo Mattafix who had their first number 1, "Big City Life", in 2006. After the group split, Roudette embarked on a solo career with two number one singles in Europe, "New Age" and "When the Beat Drops Out"; the latter made it to number 7 on the UK Singles Chart and is certified platinum. In recent years, he is also known for his co-writing work for artists, including Sinéad Harnett and his half-sister, Mabel. He co-wrote Mabel's hit singles "Finders Keepers" and "Fine Line", as well as the Not3s single "My Lover" and Jax Jones' hit "Ring Ring". He has also co-written tracks featuring Wiley, Tory Lanez, Kranium, Bad Gyal and Busy Signal.

== Biography ==
Marlon Roudette was born in London and is the son of Cameron McVey, a British music producer of Scottish and English extraction, and Vonnie Roudette, a designer and artist of Dominican/Trinidadian descent residing in Saint Vincent and the Grenadines. As a young child, he moved with his mother and sister to Trinidad, then to St. Vincent in 1992, where he began his music career, and returned to London when he was 17. Roudette is the stepson of Neneh Cherry and paternal half-brother of Mabel.

== Music career ==
=== Mattafix (2005–2009) ===
After his return to London, Marlon formed the electronic music duo Mattafix with producer and keyboardist Preetesh Hirji. Hirji was born in London of Indian parentage and grew up in the heart of West London, where he started at Eastcote Studios on Kensal Road. Their sound was a fusion of hip hop, R&B, reggae, dancehall, blues, jazz, soul and world. Mattafix won the Sopot International Song Festival in 2006.

==== Signs of a Struggle (2005–2006) ====
Mattafix released their first single, "11.30 (Dirtiest Trick in Town)", as a limited edition on Buddhist Punk Records on 13 January 2005. However, the song never charted.

Their second single, "Big City Life", was released by EMI on 8 August 2005. It was a hit, managing a number 15 in the United Kingdom and a number 1 in Germany, Poland, Austria, Italy, Switzerland and New Zealand. It also had success in other European countries where it reached the top 20. It can also be heard on the soundtrack to the hit video game FIFA World Cup Germany 2006, designed by EA Sports, and was included in the NOW! 62 UK compilation, the duo's first and only song to date, to be included in the series.

Signs of a Struggle received positive reviews and had success in Europe where the band toured extensively throughout 2006-08. Signs of a Struggle was a Triple J feature album in April 2006.

The duo toured with the likes of Jem and Joss Stone on their UK tours to promote the album, and have also opened for Sting, in Milan, before a crowd of more than 100,000 people.

Their fourth single, "To & Fro", was released on 13 March 2006. The single was released as a download only in the United Kingdom.

==== Rhythm & Hymns (2007–2009) ====
On 7 September 2007, Mattafix released the first single, "Living Darfur", taken from their second album Rhythm & Hymns. It was available as a download only. The single was released physically on 22 October 2007. The video features Matt Damon in the intro and was promoted by numerous celebrities, including Mick Jagger. The track was featured as part of the Save Darfur Campaign. Working alongside humanitarian agencies operating in the region, the band filmed a video for the song in the refugee camps in the region. The video became extremely popular on YouTube and to date is the only music video by an international group to be filmed in a war zone.

Speaking in June 2008 to English R&B writer Pete Lewis of the award-winning Blues & Soul, Roudette explained the musical background to Rhythms & Hymns: "With this album, I wanted to bring through more aspects of the live show, which is something maybe the first album lacked. You know, we do go out with a seven or eight-piece band, and that has become a big part of the Mattafix sound. So, in addition to keeping the hardcore element and programmed beats from last time round, with Rhythms & Hymns we've also used a lot of live drums. Also, we've added quite a lot of influences that we got from the road. Particularly in places like Johannesburg, South Africa, where we played a couple of great shows."

The album was released on 23 November 2007 in most European countries. In Australia, it was released on 17 November 2007.

Mattafix remixed Lady Gaga's song "Eh Eh (Nothing Else I Can Say)". Their remix appears on her iTunes Remix EP, however, not in the UK version.

=== Separation and Roudette solo career (2010–2011) ===
In April 2010, Roudette made a video appearance where he spoke about recording and making the record in his home-based studio. However, via Facebook, it was announced that Roudette and Hirji had gone separate ways, due to their different new ideas for future projects, which has brought abundant attention to fans. He is yet to come up with his new artist name; whether to stay with the name Mattafix, or choose a new stage name; perhaps his own. "Mattafix presents...Marlon..." was a quote from a late 2010 YouTube video, as an updated possibility for his album title and/or stage name. Marlon Roudette has confirmed that the new album is "not a radical shift but definitely different. More instrumentation and more in depth musical compositions." Marlon Roudette has stated that the album is pretty much completed, but the album is still being "fine tuned".

=== Matter Fixed (2011–2012) ===
On 17 July 2011, Roudette released "Brotherhood of the Broken" for free download as a promotional single from his debut album. On 20 July Marlon released "New Age" as the first single from the album in Germany for the airplay. On 16 August 2011, "New Age" was available on iTunes Store. The single has reached number 1 in Germany, Austria and Switzerland. His debut album Matter Fixed was released on 2 September 2011, in Austria, Belgium, Slovakia, Denmark, Czech Republic, Germany, Russia, Sweden and Switzerland. On 23 January 2012, it was available in France and in the rest of Europe. On 20 January 2012 Marlon released "Anti Hero (Brave New World)" on iTunes in Germany. His song "The Loss" was featured on Private Practice episode "The Time Has Come", which aired on 2 February 2012.

=== Electric Soul and further singles (2014–present) ===
On 18 July 2014, Roudette released "When the Beat Drops Out" as the lead single from his second studio album Electric Soul, the song charted in the top 5 in Austria, Germany, Latvia and Switzerland and n°8 in Italy. He released Electric Soul on 8 August 2014.

In June 2017, Roudette released the audio of his song "Ultra Love" on YouTube, which was followed by an official music video in October 2017.

== Discography ==
=== Albums ===
Title	Album details	Peak chart positions			
Title	Album details	AUT	FRA	GER	SWI
Matter Fixed	Released: 2 September 2011; Label: Universal Music; Formats: CD, digital download	27	82	6	33
Electric Soul	Released: 8 August 2014; Label: Universal Music; Formats: CD, digital download	26	—	16	4
"—" denotes a single that did not chart or was not released in that territory.

=== Extended plays ===
Title	Details
Riding Home	Released: 21 October 2011; Label: Warner Music Group; Formats: Digital download

=== Singles ===
Title	Year	Peak chart positions										Certifications	Album
Title	Year	UK	AUS	AUT	BEL (VL)	BEL (WA)	FRA	GER	ITA	NL	SWI	Certifications	Album
"New Age"	2011	90	—	1	12	7	14	1	—	9	1	BVMI: 3× Gold; IFPI AUT: Platinum; IFPI SWI: Gold	Matter Fixed
"Anti Hero (Brave New World)"	2012	—	—	5	74	—	—	6	—	—	11	BVMI: Gold	Matter Fixed
"Hold on Me"	2012	—	—	—	—	—	—	—	—	—	—		Matter Fixed
"Anti Hero (Le saut de l'ange)" (featuring Lala Joy)	2012	—	—	—	—	39	41	—	—	—	—		Matter Fixed
"When the Beat Drops Out"	2014	7	15	2	— (Note: "When the Beat Drops Out" did not enter the Ultratop 50, but peaked at number 35 on the Flemish Ultratip chart.)	29	185	1	8	39	2	BPI: Gold; ARIA: Platinum; FIMI: Platinum; BVMI: Platinum; IFPI AUT: Gold; IFPI SWI: Gold	Electric Soul
"Flicker"	2014	—	—	—	—	—	—	—	—	—	—		Electric Soul
"Everybody Feeling Something" (featuring KStewart)	2015	—	—	47	—	—	—	55	—	—	—		Electric Soul
"Ultra Love"	2017	—	—	—	—	—	—	—	—	—	—		Non-album single
"No Water"	2023	—	—	—	—	—	—	—	—	—	—		Non-album single
"—" denotes a single that did not chart or was not released in that territory.

== Songwriting credits ==
Title	Year	Artist(s)	Album	Credits	Written with
"Twist of Fate"	2003	Siobhán Donaghy	Revolution in Me	Co-writer	Siobhán Donaghy, Preetesh Hirji, Matt Kent, Cameron McVey
"I Feel Your Pain" (featuring DRAM and Mabel)	2016	SBTRKT	Save Yourself	Co-writer	Aaron Foulds, Mabel McVey
"Finders Keepers" (featuring Kojo Funds)	2017	Mabel	Bedroom EP / Ivy to Roses / High Expectations	Co-writer	Mabel McVey, Jordan D Reid, Steven Marsden, Errol Bellot
"Unconditional"	2017	Sinead Harnett	Chapter One	Co-writer	Sinead Harnett, Christian Kalla
"Fine Line" (featuring Not3s)	2018	Mabel	Ivy to Roses / High Expectations	Co-writer	Mabel McVey, Jordan D Reid, Odunaike "Not3s" Lukman
"Ring Ring" (with Mabel featuring Rich the Kid)	2018	Jax Jones	Snacks EP / High Expectations	Co-writer	Timucin Ozluer, Uzoechi Emenike, Mark Ralph, Camille Purcell, Mabel McVey
"Say You Won't Go"	2018	Nico Santos	Streets of Gold	Co-writer	Sebastian Arman, Joacim Persson, Nico Wellenbrink
"Crazy to Love You" (featuring Alex Clare)	2019	DECCO	TBA	Co-writer	Sebastian Arman, Joacim Persson
"FML"	2019	Mabel	High Expectations	Co-writer	Sarah Aarons, Warren Felder, Mabel McVey, Kelly Marie Richardson
