= Hold on Me =

Hold on Me may refer to:

- "Hold on Me" (Grinspoon song), 2005
- "Hold on Me" (Marlon Roudette song), 2012
- "Hold on Me" (Phixx song), 2003
