= New Age (Marlon Roudette song) =

Single by Marlon Roudette

from the album Matter Fixed and What a Man Soundtrack
- Released: 20 July 2011; 28 February 2012 (UK)
- Genre: Pop
- Length: 3:31
- Label: Universal Music
- Songwriters: Guy Chambers, Marlon Roudette
- Producers: Guy Chambers, Mattafix

Marlon Roudette singles chronology
"New Age" (2011)	"Anti Hero (Brave New World)" (2012)

"New Age" is a song by British recording artist Marlon Roudette, released as the first single internationally from his debut studio album, Matter Fixed. The song was released as a single, initially in Germany, on 20 July 2011. After high airplay on VIVA Germany, the single charted at number one on its first week of release in German singles chart and remained at number one for 8 consecutive weeks. It also topped the charts in two other German-speaking European countries - Austria and Switzerland - and reached high positions in Belgium, Czech Republic, France, Hungary, the Netherlands, Poland and Slovakia. However, in Roudette's motherland, the UK, it was a market failure, reaching only number 90 in the UK Singles Chart.

It was the first single release from Roudette since his band Mattafix split, which is referenced by the album title. It has been certified Double Platinum in Germany for shipments exceeding 600,000 copies.

== Track listing ==
- Digital download
1. "New Age" – 3:31
- Digital EP
1. "New Age" – 3:31
2. "New Age" (Sunship Remix) – 5:01
3. "New Age" (Astrixx Remix, featuring Smiler) – 3:17
4. "New Age" (Motto Blanco Remix) – 3:19
5. "New Age" (Soulseekers Remix) – 2:56
- German CD single
1. "New Age" – 3:31
2. "New Age" (New-Ark Remix) – 3:33

== Charts and certifications ==
=== Weekly charts ===
Chart (2011–2012)	Peak position
Austria (Ö3 Austria Top 40)	1
Belgium (Ultratop 50 Flanders)	12
Belgium (Ultratop 50 Wallonia)	7
Czech Republic Airplay (ČNS IFPI)	2
France (SNEP)	14
Germany (GfK)	1
Germany (Airplay Chart)	1
Hungary (Rádiós Top 40)	15
Netherlands (Dutch Top 40)	9
Netherlands (Single Top 100)	10
Poland Airplay (ZPAV)	4
Russia Airplay (TopHit)	7
Slovakia Airplay (ČNS IFPI)	5
Switzerland (Schweizer Hitparade)	1
UK Singles (Official Charts)	90
Ukraine Airplay (TopHit)	13

Chart (2013)	Peak position
Slovenia (SloTop50)	39

=== Year-end charts ===
Chart (2011)	Position
Austria (Ö3 Austria Top 40)	26
Germany (Official German Charts)	6
Hungary (Rádiós Top 40)	73
Russia Airplay (TopHit)	97
Switzerland (Schweizer Hitparade)	14

Chart (2012)	Position
Belgium (Ultratop Wallonia)	72
Netherlands (Dutch Top 40)	44
Netherlands (Single Top 100)	47
Ukraine Airplay (TopHit)	100

Chart (2013)	Position
Slovenia (SloTop50)	19

=== Certifications ===
Region	Certification	Certified units/sales
Austria (IFPI Austria)	Platinum	30,000^{*}
Germany (BVMI)	3× Gold	450,000^{^}
Netherlands (NVPI)	Gold	10,000^{^}
Switzerland (IFPI Switzerland)	Gold	15,000^{^}
^{*} Sales figures based on certification alone.^{^} Shipments figures based on certification alone.

== See also ==
- Mattafix
