= Return to New York =

Return to New York may refer to:

- Return to New York, storyarc of the Eastman and Laird's Teenage Mutant Ninja Turtles comics
- Return to New York, an episode of the 2003–2009 animated Teenage Mutant Ninja Turtles television series
- Return to New York, an episode of the 2012–2017 animated Teenage Mutant Ninja Turtles television series
- Return to New York (Jeeves and Wooster), an episode of the British comedy television series Jeeves and Wooster
