= Darkness on the Edge of Town (disambiguation) =

Darkness on the Edge of Town is a studio album released by Bruce Springsteen in 1978.

Darkness on the Edge of Town may also refer to:

== Music ==
- "Darkness on the Edge of Town" (song), the title song of Bruce Springsteen's Darkness on the Edge of Town album

== Television ==
- "Darkness on the Edge of Town" (Teenage Mutant Ninja Turtles), a 2003 episode of the TV series Teenage Mutant Ninja Turtles
- "Darkness on the Edge of Town" (One Tree Hill), a 2010 episode of the TV series One Tree Hill
- "Darkness on the Edge of Town" (Arrow), a 2013 episode of the TV series Arrow
- "Darkness on the Edge of Town" (Once Upon a Time), a 2015 episode of the TV series Once Upon a Time

== Other uses ==
- Darkness on the Edge of Town Tour, a 1978 North American concert tour by Bruce Springsteen
- Darkness on the Edge of Town, a 2014 novel written by Brian Keene
- Stranger Things: Darkness on the Edge of Town, a 2019 novel written by Adam Christopher
