= Monster Hunter (disambiguation) =

Monster Hunter is a franchise of fantasy-themed action role-playing video games.

Monster Hunter may also refer to:

== Related to the video game franchise ==
- Monster Hunter (video game), the 2004 first game in the franchise
- Monster Hunter (film), a 2020 film based on the franchise
- Monster Hunter: Legends of the Guild, a 2021 animated film based on the franchise

== Other uses ==
- Monster Hunter (2014 film), or Dark Was the Night, an American thriller film
- Monster Hunter International, a series of novels by Larry Correia
- The Monster Hunter (TV series) or Destination Truth, a 2007–2012 American paranormal reality series
- "The Monster Hunter" (Teenage Mutant Ninja Turtles), a 2003 television episode
