= Anti Hero (Brave New World) =

2012 single by Marlon Roudette

Single by Marlon Roudette

from the album Matter Fixed
- Released: 20 January 2012
- Recorded: 2011
- Genre: Pop
- Length: 3:27 (Single Version); 3:45 (Album Version)
- Label: Universal Music
- Songwriter(s): Marlon Roudette, Naughty Boy
- Producer(s): Naughty Boy

Marlon Roudette singles chronology
"New Age" (2011)	"Anti Hero (Brave New World)" (2012)	"Hold on Me" (2012)

"Anti Hero (Le saut de l'ange)"

Single by Marlon Roudette featuring Lala Joy
- Released: October 2012
- Recorded: 2012
- Genre: Pop
- Label: Universal Music
- Songwriter(s): Marlon Roudette, Naughtyboy
- Producer(s): Naughtyboy

Marlon Roudette singles chronology
"Hold on Me" (2012)	"Anti Hero (Le saut de l'ange)" (2012)	"When the Beat Drops Out" (2014)

"Anti Hero (Brave New World)" is a song by British recording artist Marlon Roudette from his debut studio album Matter Fixed. It was released as the second single from the album on 20 January 2012. The song has charted in Austria, Germany and Switzerland. The song was written by Roudette and Naughty Boy.

== Music video ==
A music video to accompany the release of "Anti Hero (Brave New World)" was first released onto Marlon Roudette's official site on 20 January 2012 at a total length of three minutes and twenty-six seconds.

== Track listing ==
- Amazon Single – Digital download
1. "Anti Hero" (Single Version) – 3:28
2. "Brotherhood of the Broken" – 4:04

Anti Hero – iTunes EP
No.	Title	Length
1.	"Anti Hero (Brave New World)"	3:27
2.	"Anti Hero (Brave New World) – Instrumental"	3:27
3.	"Brotherhood of the Broken"	4:04
4.	"New Age (Radio Hamburg Live Lounge Version)"	3:26

== Credits and personnel ==
- Lead vocals – Marlon Roudette
- Producer – Naughtyboy
- Lyrics – Marlon Roudette, Naughtyboy
- Label: Universal Music

== Charts and certifications ==
=== Weekly charts ===
==== Anti Hero (Brave New World) ====
Chart (2012)	Peak position
Austria (Ö3 Austria Top 40)	5
Belgium (Ultratip Bubbling Under Flanders)	24
Germany (Media Control AG)	6
Luxembourg Digital Songs (Billboard)	9
Russia Airplay (TopHit)	17
Switzerland (Schweizer Hitparade)	11

==== Anti Hero (Le saut de l'ange) ====
Chart (2012)	Peak position
Belgium (Ultratop 50 Wallonia)	48
France (SNEP)	41

=== Year-end charts ===
2012 year-end chart performance for "Anti Hero (Brave New World)"
Chart (2012)	Position
Austria (O3 Austria Top 40)	75
Germany (Media Control AG)	69
Russia Airplay (TopHit)	41

2013 year-end chart performance for "Anti Hero (Brave New World)"
Chart (2013)	Position
Russia Airplay (TopHit)	166

=== Certifications ===
Region	Certification	Certified units/sales
Germany (BVMI)	Gold	150,000^{^}
^{^} Shipments figures based on certification alone.

== Release history ==
Region	Date	Format	Label
Germany	20 January 2012	Digital Download	Universal Music
Italy	25 May 2012	Airplay	Universal Music
