= Mattafix =

English electronic duo

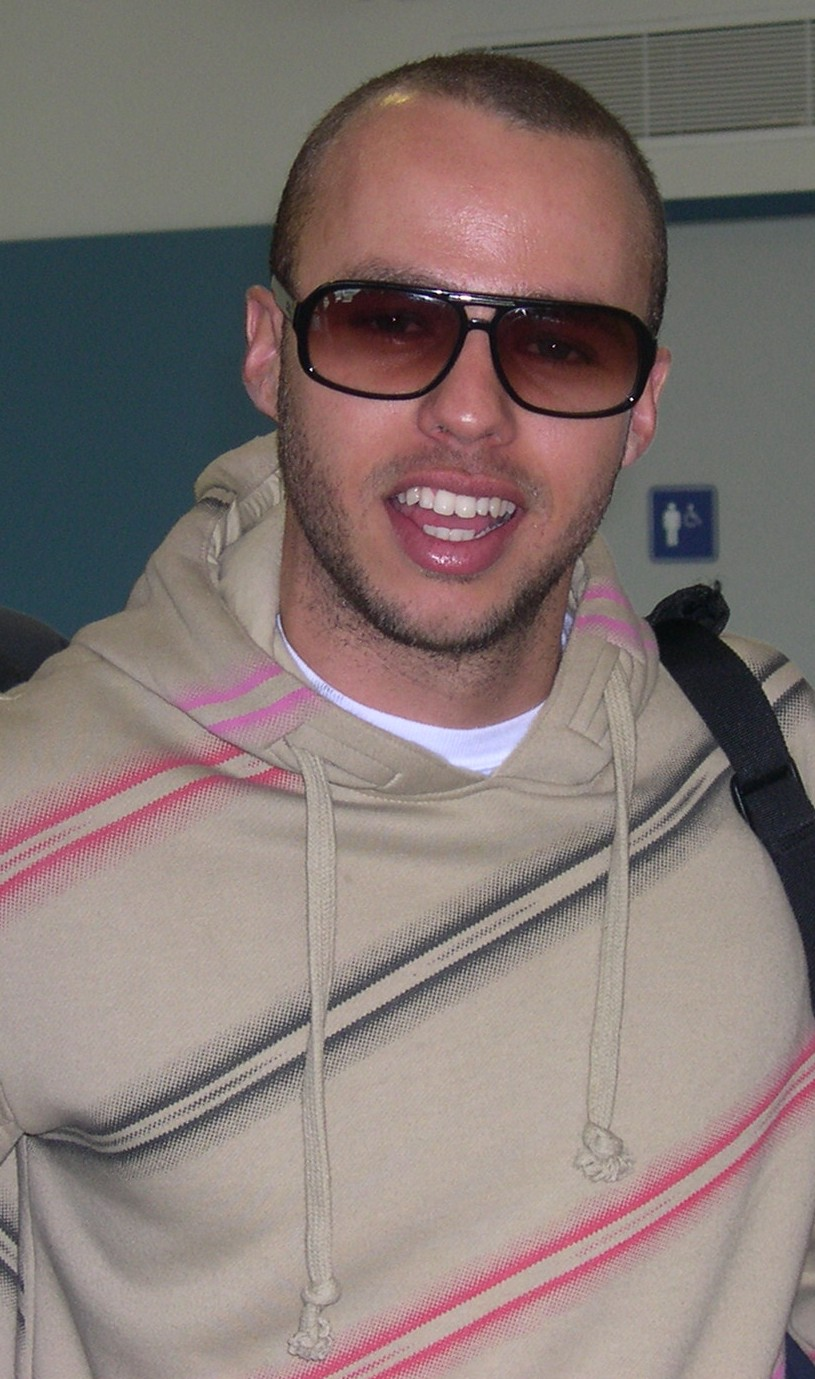
- Marlon Roudette of Mattafix

Background information
- Origin: London, England
- Genres: Electronic; hip hop; dancehall; world
- Years active: 2005–2010, 2024–present
- Labels: Virgin Records (EMI International); Angel Music; Beegood Limited; Buddhist Punk
- Past members: Marlon Roudette; Preetesh Hirji
- Website: myspace.com/mattafix

Mattafix is an English electronic music duo, consisting of vocalist Marlon Roudette and producer and keyboardist Preetesh Hirji. Their sound is a fusion of hip hop, R&B, reggae, dancehall, blues, jazz, soul and world. Known for their 2005 hit single "Big City Life", they won the Sopot International Song Festival in 2006.

== Biography ==
Marlon Rosegold McVey-Roudette was born in London and is the son of Cameron McVey, a British music producer, and Vonnie Roudette, a designer and artist from Saint Vincent and the Grenadines. As a young child, he moved with his mother and sister to St. Vincent, where he began his music career before returning to London when he was 18. Preetesh Hirji was born in London of dual-Indian parentage and grew up in the heart of West London, where he started at Eastcote Studios on Kensal Road.

=== Signs of a Struggle (2005–2006) ===
Mattafix released their first single, "11.30 (Dirtiest Trick in Town)", as a limited edition on Buddhist Punk Records on 13 January 2005. However, the song never charted.

Their second single, "Big City Life", was released by EMI on 8 August 2005. It was a considerable hit, managing number 15 in their native United Kingdom and number 1 in Germany, Poland, Austria, Italy, Switzerland and New Zealand. It also had considerable success in other countries, including top-20 positions in France, Australia, and Belgium. It can also be heard on the soundtrack to the hit video game 2006 FIFA World Cup Germany, designed by EA Sports. "Big City Life" also received multiple popular remixes over the ensuing decades, including notable remixes by LEEX, Luude, and Sam Jonsson; the Luude remix, released in 2022, has amassed 15.8 million streams on Spotify alone (compared to 118.4 million Spotify streams for the original) as of August 2022.

Signs of a Struggle received positive reviews and had success in Europe where the band toured extensively throughout 2006–08. Signs of a Struggle was a Triple J feature album in April 2006.

The duo toured with the likes of Jem and Joss Stone on their UK tours to promote the album, and have also opened for Sting, in Milan, before a crowd of more than 100,000 people.

Their fourth single, "To & Fro", was released on 13 March 2006. The single was released as a download only in the United Kingdom.

=== Rhythm & Hymns (2007–2009) ===
On 7 September 2007, Mattafix released "Living Darfur", the first single taken from their second album Rhythm & Hymns. It was available as a download only. The single was released physically on 22 October 2007. The video features Matt Damon in the intro. The track was featured as part of the Save Darfur Campaign. Working alongside humanitarian agencies operating in the region, the band filmed a video for the song in the refugee camps in the region. The video became extremely popular on YouTube and to date is the only music video by an international group to be filmed in a war zone.

Speaking in June 2008 to English R&B writer Pete Lewis of Blues & Soul, Roudette explained the musical background to Rhythms & Hymns: "With this album I wanted to bring through more aspects of the live show, which is something maybe the first album lacked. You know, we do go out with a seven or eight-piece band, and that has become a big part of the Mattafix sound. So, in addition to keeping the hardcore element and programmed beats from last time round, with Rhythms & Hymns we've also used a lot of live drums. Also, we've added quite a lot of influences that we got from the road. Particularly in places like Johannesburg, where we played a couple of great shows."

The album was released on 23 November 2007 in most European countries. In Australia, it was released on 17 November 2007.

Mattafix remixed Lady Gaga's song "Eh Eh (Nothing Else I Can Say)". Their remix appears on her iTunes Remix EP; however, it is not on the UK version.

=== Separation and Roudette solo career (2010–2014) ===
In April 2010, Marlon Roudette made a video appearance where he spoke about recording and making the record in his home-based studio. However, via Facebook, it was announced that Roudette and Hirji had gone separate ways due to their different new ideas for future projects. Roudette's first solo album Matter Fixed was released on 2 September 2011. His sophomore effort, Electric Soul, was released on 8 August 2014.

=== Inactivity (2015–present) ===
From 2015 and for the ensuing decade, Mattafix was inactive and had no new releases. In January 2024 however, the duo reportedly briefly reunited.

== Awards and nominations ==
Award	Year	Nominee(s)	Category	Result	Ref.
Eska Music Awards	2006	"Big City Life"	Best International Hit	Won	
Hungarian Music Awards	2006	Signs of a Struggle	Best Foreign Rap or Hip-Hop Album	Nominated	
Hungarian Music Awards	2007	Signs of a Struggle	Best Foreign Dance Album	Nominated	

== Discography ==
=== Albums ===
Title	Album details	Peak chart positions									
Title	Album details	UK	AUS	AUT	BEL	EU	FRA	GER	ITA	POL	SWI
Signs of a Struggle	Released: 31 October 2005; Label: EMI; Formats: CD, digital download	159	56	10	60	62	75	35	12	64	15
Rhythm & Hymns	Released: 19 November 2007; Label: EMI; Formats: CD, digital download	—	—	—	69	92	48	73	17	87	22

=== Singles ===
Year	Title	Chart positions										Certifications	Album
Year	Title	UK	AUS	AUT	BEL	FRA	GER	ITA	NOR	NZ	SWI	Certifications	Album
2005	"11.30 (Dirtiest Trick in Town)"	—	—	—	—	—	—	—	—	—	—		Signs of a Struggle
2005	"Big City Life"	15	19	1	12	17	1	1	3	1	1	RMNZ: Gold	Signs of a Struggle
2005	"Passer By"	79	—	—	—	—	—	—	—	—	—		Signs of a Struggle
2006	"To & Fro"	—	—	—	56	—	73	56	—	—	56		Signs of a Struggle
2006	"Cool Down the Pace"	—	—	52	—	—	82	25	—	—	63		Signs of a Struggle
2007	"Living Darfur"	—	—	21	50	50	32	2	—	—	13		Rhythm & Hymns
2008	"Things Have Changed"	—	—	—	—	—	—	—	—	—	—		Rhythm & Hymns
2022	"Big City Life" (Remix with Luude)	8	55	19	—	—	67	—	—	2	—	BPI: 2× Platinum; ARIA: 2× Platinum; RMNZ: 2× Platinum	Non-album single

== Music videos ==
Year	Title	Director(s)
2005	"Big City Life"	Scott Franklin
2005	"Passer By"	Rankin
2006	"To & Fro"	Max & Dania
2006	"Cool Down the Pace"	Max & Dania
2007	"Living Darfur"	Toby MacDonald
2008	"Things Have Changed"	Justin Francis
