= Matter Fixed =

2011 album by Marlon Roudette

Studio album by Marlon Roudette
- Released: 2 September 2011 (Germany); 19 March 2012 (UK)
- Length: 46:40
- Label: Universal Music
- Producer: Guy Chambers, Mattafix, Brian West, Vada Nobles, Paul O'Duffy, Kwame, Craigy Dodds, Naughty Boy

Marlon Roudette chronology
| Matter Fixed (2011) | Electric Soul (2014) |

Singles from Matter Fixed
- 1. "New Age" Released: 20 July 2011; 2. "Riding Home" Released: 24 October 2011; 3. "Anti Hero" Released: 20 January 2012; 4. "Hold on Me" Released: 1 June 2012

Matter Fixed is the first album by the English singer, Marlon Roudette, released on 2 September 2011. The name is a reference to the project he was involved with before starting solo, a duo with Preetesh Hirji called Mattafix.

== Singles ==
On 17 July 2011 Roudette released "Brotherhood of the Broken" for free download as a promotional single from the album. On 20 July he released "New Age" as the first single from the album in Germany for airplay. On 16 August 2011 "New Age" was available on the iTunes Store. The single reached number 1 in Germany, Austria and Switzerland.

The second single from the album was "Riding Home", released as an EP only in the UK. Roudette noted that the third single from the album would be "Anti Hero"; on 20 January 2012 it was released via iTunes in Germany.

== Release dates ==
"Matter Fixed" was released on 2 September 2011 in Austria, Belgium, Slovakia, Denmark, Czech Republic, Germany, Russia, Sweden and Switzerland. On 23 January 2012 it was available in France and in the rest of Europe.

The release in the United Kingdom was delayed until 19 March 2012.

== Track listing ==
| No. | Title | Producer(s) | Length |
|---|---|---|---|
| 1. | "Storyline" | Brian West | 4:50 |
| 2. | "New Age" | Guy Chambers, Marlon Roudette | 3:31 |
| 3. | "Hold on Me" | Vada Nobles | 3:47 |
| 4. | "Brotherhood of the Broken" | Marlon Roudette, Guy Chambers | 4:03 |
| 5. | "Didn't I" | Paul O'Duffy | 3:46 |
| 6. | "True to Yourself" (featuring Finley Quaye) | Mattafix | 3:39 |
| 7. | "Riding Home" | Craigie Dodds | 4:04 |
| 8. | "10 Million" | Kwame | 3:45 |
| 9. | "Anti Hero (Brave New World)" | Naughty Boy | 3:45 |
| 10. | "The Loss" | Craigie Dodds | 3:28 |
| 11. | "Closer" (featuring Lucy Leston) | Mattafix | 4:13 |
| 12. | "City Like This" | Mattafix | 3:49 |

== Charts ==
| Chart (2011) | Peak position |
|---|---|
| Austrian Albums Chart | 27 |
| French Albums Chart | 82 |
| German Albums Chart | 6 |
| Swiss Albums Chart | 33 |

== Riding Home ==
Riding Home

EP by Marlon Roudette
- Released: (United Kingdom) 24 October 2011
- Length: 15:05
- Label: Warner Music Group

On 24 October 2011, after signing with the Warner Music Group record label for the UK, Roudette released an EP in the UK named Riding Home, with four tracks from Matter Fixed. It failed to enter the UK Singles Chart.

=== Track listing ===
Digital Download
| No. | Title | Length |
|---|---|---|
| 1. | "Riding Home" | 4:06 |
| 2. | "Didn't I" | 3:48 |
| 3. | "True to Yourself" (featuring Finley Quaye) | 3:41 |
| 4. | "The Loss" | 3:30 |

12" Vinyl limited edition
| No. | Title | Length |
|---|---|---|
| 1. | "Riding Home (Cooly G remix)" |
| 2. | "Riding Home (DVA Hi:Emotions remix)" |
| 3. | "Riding Home (original mix)" |
| 4. | "Riding Home (instrumental)" |
