= Signs of a Struggle =

Studio album by Mattafix
- Released: 31 October 2005
- Genre: Pop; hip hop; reggae
- Length: 61:13
- Label: Virgin (EMI International); Angel Music; Beegood Limited; Buddhist Punk
- Producer: Mattafix

Mattafix chronology
Signs of a Struggle (2005)	Rhythm & Hymns (2007)

Professional ratings
Review scores
Source	Rating
AllMusic	4.5/5 stars
The Guardian	2/5 stars

Signs of a Struggle is the debut album by English recording duo Mattafix, released on 31 October 2005 throughout Europe. The duo stated that the album is a reflection of the experiences and hardships they have gone through.

== Reception ==
AllMusic writer Alexey Eremenko gave the album four-and-a-half stars out of five, praising the originality and variety of styles by saying: "The debut album by Mattafix is a pleasantly tantalizing experience of guessing the sound and never being quite there -- because Mattafix has taken the old elements and made them into something new, or at least untried before."

However, Dorian Lynskey of The Guardian gave the album two stars out of five, criticising the lyrical themes which blamed different people, saying: "The bellyflop performed by Ms Dynamite's second album suggests that the British public have scant tolerance for the sound of fingers being wagged in their faces. This is bad news for London-based duo Mattafix, whose debut consists of little else."

== Track listings ==
1. "Gangster Blues" (Marlon Roudette) – 4:19
2. "Big City Life" (Marlon Roudette/Preetesh Hirji) – 4:00
3. "Passer By" (Marlon Roudette/Ross Godfrey/Chris Harrison) – 3:33
4. "To & Fro" (Marlon Roudette/Preetesh Hirji) – 4:04
5. "Everyone Around You" (Marlon Roudette/Preetesh Hirji) – 4:58
6. "Clear and Present Danger" (Marlon Roudette/Preetesh Hirji) – 4:20
7. "Older" (Marlon Roudette) – 2:49
8. "I to You" (Marlon Roudette/Phil Thornalley) – 4:21
9. "Impartial" (Marlon Roudette/Preetesh Hirji) – 3:55
10. "The Means" (Marlon Roudette/Preetesh Hirji) – 4:09
11. "11:30 (Dirtiest Trick in Town)" (Marlon Roudette/Oshik Levy/Neil Pearson) – 3:28
12. "The Forgotten" (Marlon Roudette/Ross Godfrey/Chris Harrison) – 3:52
13. "555" (Marlon Roudette/Preetesh Hirji) – 6:33
14. "Cool Down the Pace" (Gregory Isaacs/Sylvester Weise) – 7:02

== Charts ==
=== Weekly charts ===
Weekly chart performance for Signs of a Struggle
Chart (2005–2006)	Peak position
Australian Albums (ARIA)	56
Austrian Albums (Ö3 Austria)	10
Belgian Albums (Ultratop Flanders)	60
French Albums (SNEP)	75
German Albums (Offizielle Top 100)	35
Italian Albums (FIMI)	12
Swiss Albums (Schweizer Hitparade)	15
UK Albums (OCC)	159

=== Year-end charts ===
Year-end chart performance for Signs of a Struggle
Chart (2006)	Position4
Australian Urban Albums (ARIA)	40
Swiss Albums (Schweizer Hitparade)	87
