= Rhythm & Hymns =

Studio album by Mattafix
- Released: 19 November 2007 (UK)
- Label: Virgin Records (EMI International), Angel Music, Beegood Limited, Buddhist Punk
- Producer: Mattafix with additional production and mixing by Jim Abbiss, Craig Silvy, Steve Dubb and Seggs

Mattafix chronology
'Signs of a Struggle' (2005)	Rhythm & Hymns (2007)

Rhythm & Hymns is Mattafix's second and final album, released in November 2007. The album includes the charity single "Living Darfur", as well as "Shake Your Limbs", "Things Have Changed" and "Angel".

== Reception ==
Allmusic writer Alexey Eremenko gave the album three stars out of five, saying that the band were struggling to live up to the originality of their first release "Rhythm & Hymns isn't enough of a letdown to do the band in, but it's certainly nowhere as necessary as their first LP. One major drawback is that now the roots are showing. Their borrowings from reggae stylistics are much more explicit than before, and neither the absence of Jah and marijuana, nor the sweet high voice of Marlon Roudette are enough to camouflage it."

== Track listing ==
1. "Shake Your Limbs" (Marlon Roudette/Preetesh Hirji/Ben Allen/Bonginkosi "Zola" Dlamini) - 3:40
2. "Living Darfur" (Marlon Roudette/Chico Twala) - 4:12
3. "Angel on My Shoulder" (Marlon Roudette/Amanda Ghost/Ian Dench/Patti O'Dawes) - 4:10
4. "In the Background" (Marlon Roudette/Jody Street/James Dring) - 3:45
5. "Things Have Changed" (Marlon Roudette/Preetesh Hirji) - 3:46
6. "Stranger Forever" (Marlon Roudette/Preetesh Hirji) - 4:02
7. "Freeman" (Marlon Roudette/Łukasz Borowiecki/Tomasz Mioduszewski) - 4:31
8. "Got to Lose" (Marlon Roudette/Preetesh Hirji) - 3:34
9. "In My Life" (Marlon Roudette/Ben Allen) - 4:30
10. "Memories of Soweto" (Marlon Roudette/Bonginkosi "Zola" Dlamini/Khethukubonga "Khethi" Nishanease/Pops Mohammed) - 3:38
11. "Far From Over" (Marlon Roudette/Preetesh Hirji) - 3:54
12. "Separate Ways" (Marlon Roudette/Preetesh Hirji) - 2:21 (iTunes bonus track)

== Charts ==
Chart (2007)	Peak position
Belgian Alternative Albums Chart	31
European Albums Chart	92
French Albums Chart	48
Italian Albums Chart	17
Polish Albums Chart	87
Swiss Albums Chart	22
