= When the Beat Drops Out =

2014 single by Marlon Roudette

Single by Marlon Roudette

from the album Electric Soul
- Released: 18 July 2014
- Length: 3:24 (album version); 4:56 (Florian Paetzold remix)
- Label: Universal Music
- Songwriters: Marlon Roudette; Jamie Hartman
- Producers: Tim Bran; Roy Kerr

Marlon Roudette singles chronology
"Anti Hero (Le saut de l'ange)" (2012)	"When the Beat Drops Out" (2014)	"Flicker" (2014)

"When the Beat Drops Out" is a song by British/Vincentian musician Marlon Roudette from his second studio album, Electric Soul (2014). The song was written by Marlon Roudette and Jamie Hartman. It was released in Germany on 18 July 2014 as the lead single from the album. It was released in the United Kingdom on 1 March 2015.

"When the Beat Drops Out" has charted at number one in Germany, number two in Austria and Switzerland, and number 15 in Australia. It also debuted and peaked at number 7 in the United Kingdom.

== Music video ==
A music video to accompany the release of "When the Beat Drops Out" was first released onto YouTube on 4 July 2014 at a total length of three minutes and forty-two seconds.

== Track listing ==
Album version
No.	Title	Length
1.	"When the Beat Drops Out"	3:24

Digital download
No.	Title	Length
1.	"When the Beat Drops Out" (Florian Paetzold Remix)	4:56

== Charts and certifications ==
=== Weekly charts ===
Chart (2014–2015)	Peak position
Australia (ARIA)	15
Austria (Ö3 Austria Top 40)	2
Belgium (Ultratip Bubbling Under Flanders)	35
Belgium (Ultratop 50 Wallonia)	29
Czech Republic Airplay (ČNS IFPI)	1
Czech Republic Singles Digital (ČNS IFPI)	34
Denmark (Tracklisten)	39
Euro Digital Song Sales (Billboard)	13
Finland Download (Latauslista)	9
France (SNEP)	148
Germany (GfK)	1
Germany (Airplay Chart)	1
Hungary (Rádiós Top 40)	27
Hungary (Stream Top 40)	35
Ireland (IRMA)	32
Italy (FIMI)	8
Luxembourg Digital Song Sales (Billboard)	2
Netherlands (Dutch Top 40)	37
Netherlands (Single Top 100)	57
Scottish Singles Sales (Official Charts)	8
Slovakia Airplay (ČNS IFPI)	3
Slovakia Singles Digital (ČNS IFPI)	42
Slovenia (SloTop50)	22
Sweden Heatseeker (Sverigetopplistan)	17
Switzerland (Schweizer Hitparade)	2
UK Singles (Official Charts)	7
UK Singles Downloads (Official Charts)	4
US Dance Club Songs (Billboard)	17

=== Year-end charts ===
Chart (2014)	Position
Austria (Ö3 Austria Top 40)	37
Germany (Official German Charts)	13
Italy (FIMI)	84
Switzerland (Schweizer Hitparade)	21
Chart (2015)	Position
UK Singles (Official Charts Company)	71

=== Certifications ===
Region	Certification	Certified units/sales
Australia (ARIA)	Platinum	70,000^{^}
Austria (IFPI Austria)	Gold	15,000^{*}
Denmark (IFPI Danmark)	Gold	30,000^{^}
Germany (BVMI)	Platinum	400,000^{‡}
Italy (FIMI)	Platinum	30,000^{‡}
Switzerland (IFPI Switzerland)	Gold	15,000^{^}
United Kingdom (BPI)	Platinum	600,000^{‡}
^{*} Sales figures based on certification alone.^{^} Shipments figures based on certification alone.^{‡} Sales+streaming figures based on certification alone.

== Release history ==
Region	Date	Format	Label
Germany	18 July 2014	Digital download	Universal Music
Canada	4 December 2014	Digital download	Universal Music
United States	4 December 2014	Digital download	Universal Music
Ireland	27 February 2015	Digital download	Universal Music
United Kingdom	1 March 2015	Digital download	Universal Music
