= Cool Down the Pace =

Single by Mattafix

from the album Signs of a Struggle
- Released: 28 August 2006
- Recorded: 2005
- Length: 7:02 (album version); 3:34 (radio edit)
- Label: Virgin Records (EMI International), Angel Music, Beegood Limited, Buddhist Punk
- Songwriter(s): Gregory Isaacs, Sylvester Weise

Mattafix singles chronology
"To & Fro" (2006)	"Cool Down the Pace" (2006)	"Living Darfur" (2007)

"Cool Down the Pace" is the final single from Mattafix's debut album, Signs of a Struggle, released in 2006. The song charted in Germany, Italy, Austria, and Switzerland. The original song was sung by Gregory Isaacs and was released on his 1982 album Night Nurse.

== Track listing ==
=== Digital download ===
1. "Cool Down the Pace" (Radio Version)

=== CD single ===
1. "Cool Down the Pace" (Radio Version)
2. "Cool Down the Pace" (Phatt Reggaeton Remix)

=== EP ===
1. "Cool Down the Pace" (Radio Version)
2. "Cool Down the Pace" (Extended)
3. "Cool Down the Pace" (Fem Fem's Funkateriamix)
4. "Cool Down the Pace" (Sly & Robbie Mix)
5. "Cool Down the Pace" (Cass & Mangan Remix)
6. "Cool Down the Pace" (Seiji Remix)
7. "Cool Down the Pace" (Phatt Reggaeton Remix)
8. "Cool Down the Pace" (OD Hunte Remix) (featuring Jim Screech)

== Charts ==
Chart (2006)	Peak position
Austria (Ö3 Austria Top 40)	52
European Singles Chart	144
Germany (GfK)	82
Italy (Italian Singles Chart)	25
Slovakia (Rádio Top 100)	17
Switzerland (Schweizer Hitparade)	63
