= Big City Life =

2005 single by Mattafix

Single by Mattafix

from the album Signs of a Struggle
- Released: 8 August 2005
- Length: 3:57
- Label: Buddhist Punk
- Songwriters: Marlon Roudette; Preetesh Hirji
- Producer: Mattafix

Mattafix singles chronology
"11.30" (2005)	"Big City Life" (2005)	"To & Fro" (2006)

Audio
- "Big City Life" on YouTube

"Big City Life" is a song by English electronic music duo Mattafix. With a chorus sung in Jamaican Patois, "Big City Life" was released in August 2005 as the second single from Mattafix's debut album, Signs of a Struggle (2005). The single topped the charts in Austria, Germany, Italy, New Zealand, and Switzerland, and it peaked at number 15 in the duo's native United Kingdom. The song's music video was directed by Scott Franklin.

== Track listings ==
UK CD1

1. "Big City Life"
2. "Big City Life" (Cutfather & Joe)

UK CD2

1. "Big City Life" – 3:57
2. "Big City Life" (Cutfather & Joe) – 3:55
3. "Big City Life" (video) – 3:57

European 7-inch single

A. "Big City Life" (Sly and Robbie) – 3:56
B. "Big City Life" (Mattafix mix) – 6:11

European 12-inch single

A1. "Big City Life" (Solid Groove)
A2. "Big City Life" (Cutfather & Joe)
B1. "Big City Life" (Mattafix mix)
B2. "Big City Life" (Sly and Robbie)

European maxi-CD single

1. "Big City Life"
2. "Big City Life" (Cutfather & Joe)
3. "Big City Life" (Solid Groove)
4. "Big City Life" (Mattafix Mix)
5. "Big City Life" (video)

Australian CD single

1. "Big City Life"
2. "Big City Life" (Cutfather & Joe)
3. "Big City Life" (Solid Groove)
4. "Big City Life" (Mattafix mix)

== Personnel ==
Personnel are lifted from the Signs of a Struggle album booklet.

- Mattafix – instruments, production
  - Marlon Roudette – writing, vocals
  - Preetesh Hirji – writing
- Steve Dubb – additional production and mix
- Segs – additional production and mix

== Charts ==
=== Weekly charts ===
Weekly chart performance for "Big City Life"
Chart (2005–2007)	Peak position
Australia (ARIA)	19
Australian Urban (ARIA)	6
Austria (Ö3 Austria Top 40)	1
Belgium (Ultratop 50 Flanders)	12
Belgium (Ultratop 50 Wallonia)	19
CIS Airplay (TopHit)	20
Czech Republic Airplay (ČNS IFPI)	3
Denmark (Tracklisten)	9
Europe (Eurochart Hot 100)	2
Finland (Suomen virallinen lista)	12
France (SNEP)	18
Germany (GfK)	1
Hungary (Rádiós Top 40)	9
Hungary (Dance Top 40)	12
Italy (FIMI)	1
Netherlands (Single Top 100)	84
New Zealand (Recorded Music NZ)	1
Norway (VG-lista)	3
Russia Airplay (TopHit)	18
Scottish Singles Sales (Official Charts)	12
Sweden (Sverigetopplistan)	17
Switzerland (Schweizer Hitparade)	1
UK Singles (Official Charts)	15
UK Hip Hop/R&B (Official Charts)	7

=== Year-end charts ===
2005 year-end chart performance for "Big City Life"
Chart (2005)	Position
Austria (Ö3 Austria Top 40)	50
Belgium (Ultratop 50 Flanders)	60
CIS Airplay (TopHit)	166
Europe (Eurochart Hot 100)	99
Italy (FIMI)	6
New Zealand (RIANZ)	16
Russia Airplay (TopHit)	156
Sweden (Hitlistan)	96
Switzerland (Schweizer Hitparade)	98
UK Singles (OCC)	192

2006 year-end chart performance for "Big City Life"
Chart (2006)	Position
Australian Urban (ARIA)	30
Austria (Ö3 Austria Top 40)	4
CIS Airplay (TopHit)	51
Europe (Eurochart Hot 100)	15
Germany (Media Control GfK)	7
Hungary (Dance Top 40)	59
Italy (FIMI)	36
Russia Airplay (TopHit)	47
Switzerland (Schweizer Hitparade)	7

=== Decade-end charts ===
Decade-end chart performance for "Big City Life"
Chart (2000–2009)	Position
Germany (Media Control GfK)	58
Russia Airplay (TopHit)	200

== Certifications ==
Certifications and sales for "Big City Life"
Region	Certification	Certified units/sales
Austria (IFPI Austria)	Gold	15,000^{*}
Germany (BVMI)	Platinum	300,000^{^}
Italy (FIMI)	Gold	25,000^{‡}
New Zealand (RMNZ)	Gold	5,000^{*}
Switzerland (IFPI Switzerland)	Platinum	40,000^{^}
^{*} Sales figures based on certification alone.^{^} Shipments figures based on certification alone.^{‡} Sales+streaming figures based on certification alone.

== Release history ==
Release dates and formats for "Big City Life"
Region	Date	Format(s)	Label(s)	Ref.
United Kingdom	8 August 2005	7-inch vinyl; CD	Buddhist Punk	
Australia	13 February 2006	CD	Buddhist Punk	

== Luude version ==
"Big City Life"

Single by Luude and Mattafix
- Released: 17 June 2022
- Genre: Drum and bass
- Length: 2:26
- Label: Sweat It Out
- Songwriters: Marlon Roudette; Preetesh Hirji
- Producer: Luude

Luude and Mattafix singles chronology
"Down Under" (2021)	"Big City Life" (2022)	"Oh My" (2023)

In 2022, Australian producer Luude was approached by Mattafix to remix "Big City Life" as a drum and bass track. The song was released on 17 June 2022 and reached the top 10 on the Official New Zealand Singles Chart.

At the 2023 ARIA Music Awards, the song was nominated for Song of the Year.

=== Weekly charts ===
Weekly chart performance for "Big City Life" by Luude and Mattafix
Chart (2022–2023)	Peak position
Australia (ARIA)	55
Austria (Ö3 Austria Top 40)	19
Czech Republic Singles Digital (ČNS IFPI)	54
Germany (GfK)	67
Ireland (IRMA)	30
New Zealand (Recorded Music NZ)	2
UK Singles (Official Charts)	8
UK Dance (Official Charts)	4

=== Year-end charts ===
Year-end chart performance for "Big City Life" by Luude and Mattafix
Chart (2022)	Position
New Zealand (Recorded Music NZ)	31
UK Singles (OCC)	65

=== Certifications ===
Certifications for "Big City Life" by Luude and Mattafix
Region	Certification	Certified units/sales
Australia (ARIA)	2× Platinum	140,000^{‡}
Austria (IFPI Austria)	Gold	15,000^{‡}
New Zealand (RMNZ)	2× Platinum	60,000^{‡}
United Kingdom (BPI)	2× Platinum	1,200,000^{‡}
^{‡} Sales+streaming figures based on certification alone.
