= To & Fro =

Single by Mattafix

from the album Signs of a Struggle
- Released: 13 March 2006
- Recorded: 2006
- Length: 4:04
- Label: Virgin Records (EMI International), Angel Music, Beegood Limited, Buddhist Punk
- Songwriter(s): Marlon Roudette & P Hirji

Mattafix singles chronology
"Big City Life" (2005)	"To & Fro" (2006)	"Cool Down the Pace" (2006)

"To & Fro" is a single from Mattafix's debut album, Signs of a Struggle, released in 2005. The song features backing vocals from Sugababes member, Siobhán Donaghy. It was released as a download only single on 13 March 2006 in the United Kingdom.

== Track listing ==
=== Digital download ===
1. "To & Fro" (Winning Remix)
2. "To & Fro" (featuring Disiz La Peste)

=== CD single ===
1. "To & Fro"
2. "11.30" (Sweetie Irie Remix) (featuring Babychan)

=== EP ===
1. "To & Fro"
2. "To & Fro" (Desert Eagle Discs Remix)
3. "To & Fro" (Chicken Lips Remix)

== Charts ==
Chart (2006)	Peak position
Belgium (Ultratip Bubbling Under Flanders)	6
Belgium (Ultratip Bubbling Under Wallonia)	7
Czech Republic (Rádio – Top 100)	12
Germany (GfK)	73
Italy (Italian Singles Chart)	56
Poland (ZPAV)	30
Switzerland (Schweizer Hitparade)	56
