= The More Things Change =

"The more things change, the more they stay the same" (q:plus ça change, plus c'est la même chose) is an aphorism by French critic Jean-Baptiste Alphonse Karr.

The More Things Change may also refer to:

- The More Things Change… (film), a 1986 Australian film
- "The More Things Change", a song by Cinderella on their 1990 album Heartbreak Station
- The More Things Change…, a 1997 album by Machine Head
- "The More Things Change" (comics), a 2000 Marvel Comics story arc by Fabian Nicieza and Steve Skroce
- "The More Things Change", a song by Bon Jovi on their 2010 album Greatest Hits
