= Hold on Me (Marlon Roudette song) =

"Hold On Me"

Single by Marlon Roudette

from the album Matter Fixed
- Released: 1 June 2012
- Recorded: 2011
- Genre: Power pop
- Length: 3:17 (Radio edit); 3:49 (Album version)
- Label: Universal Music
- Songwriters: Vada Nobles, Marlon Roudette
- Producer: Vada Nobles

Marlon Roudette singles chronology
"Anti Hero (Brave New World)" (2012)	"Hold On Me" (2012)	"Anti Hero (Le saut de l'ange)" (2012)

"Hold On Me" is a song by British pop artist Marlon Roudette, from his debut solo album Matter Fixed. It is the third track on the album. It was released as the fourth and final single from Matter Fixed on 1, June 2012.

"Hold On Me" appeared in the compilation albums Bravo Hits, Vol. 77 and Best of 2012 - Sommerhits. The song was featured in the British reality television series Made in Chelsea.

== Music video ==
A music video directed by "LJ" for the song was released on 20, June 2012 with a total length of three minutes and eighteen seconds. In the video, Marlon is shown sitting in a bedroom and walking on the walls.
