= Living Darfur =

Single by Mattafix featuring Matt Damon

from the album Rhythm & Hymns
- Released: 7 September 2007 (Digital); 22 October 2007 (Physical)
- Recorded: 2007
- Length: 4:15
- Label: Virgin Records (EMI International), Angel Music, Beegood Limited, Buddhist Punk
- Songwriter(s): Marlon Roudette/Sello 'Chicco' Twala

Mattafix featuring Matt Damon singles chronology
"Cool Down the Pace" (2006)	"Living Darfur" (2007)	"Things Have Changed" (2008)

"Living Darfur" (also known as "Living") is the first single from Mattafix's album Rhythm and Hymns, released in 2007. The beginning of the song sounds similar to a part of Madonna's song "Mother and Father", taken from her 2003 release American Life. The Zulu part of the song is a sample of South African song "Umagubane" by Chicco Twala.

== Music video ==
The music video, funded by Mick Jagger and set in a refugee camp, aims to raise awareness for Darfur and catch the attention of the United Nations. It was released on 16 September 2007, which is "Global Day for Darfur". The video was shot in Eastern Chad on the border of Darfur. Matt Damon makes a brief cameo in the video.

== Track listings ==
=== Digital download ===
1. "Living Darfur" (Marlon Roudette/Chico Twala)

=== CD single ===
1. "Living Darfur" (Marlon Roudette/Chico Twala)
2. "Living Darfur" (Desert Eagle Discs Remix)

=== Enhanced CD single ===
1. "Living Darfur"
2. "Living Darfur" (Desert Eagle Discs Remix)
3. "Living Darfur" (Video)

=== EP ===
1. "Living Darfur"
2. "Living Darfur" (Instrumental)
3. "Living Darfur" (Subway Remix)
4. "Living Darfur" (Desert Eagle Discs Remix)

== Charts ==
=== Weekly charts ===
Chart (2007–08)	Peak position
Austria (Ö3 Austria Top 40)	21
Belgium (Ultratop 50 Flanders)	50
Belgium (Ultratip Bubbling Under Wallonia)	12
Czech Republic (Rádio – Top 100)	41
Europe (European Hot 100 Singles)	31
France (SNEP)	50
Germany (GfK)	32
Italy (FIMI)	2
Poland (ZPAV)	34
Slovakia (Rádio Top 100)	40
Switzerland (Schweizer Hitparade)	13
Turkish Singles Chart	32

=== Year-end charts ===
Chart (2008)	Position
Switzerland (Schweizer Hitparade)	80
