= Electric Soul =

Second studio album by the British/Vincentian musician Marlon Roudette

Studio album by Marlon Roudette
- Released: 8 August 2014
- Recorded: 2013
- Genre: Pop
- Label: Universal Music
- Producers: Tim Bran; Roy Kerr; Dom Search

Marlon Roudette chronology
Matter Fixed (2011)	Electric Soul (2014)

Singles from Electric Soul
- 1. "When the Beat Drops Out" Released: 18 July 2014; 2. "Flicker" Released: 12 December 2014

Electric Soul is the second studio album by the British/Vincentian musician Marlon Roudette. It was released in Germany on 8 August 2014 via Universal Music. The album entered the charts in Austria, Germany and Switzerland. It includes the singles "When the Beat Drops Out" and "Flicker".

== Singles ==
"When the Beat Drops Out" was released as the lead single from the album on 18 July 2014. The song reached number 1 in Germany, number 2 in Austria and Switzerland, number 7 in the UK and number 15 in Australia.

"Flicker" was released as the second single from the album on 12 December 2014.

== Track listing ==
Standard listing
No.	Title	Writer(s)	Producer(s)	Length
1.	"America"	Marlon Roudette; Laila Samuelsen; Christian "Crada" Kalla	Tim Bran; Roy Kerr	3:29
2.	"Come Along"	Roudette; Samuelsen; David Jost; Joacim Persson	Bran; Kerr	3:42
3.	"When the Beat Drops Out"	Roudette; Jamie Hartman	Bran; Kerr	3:24
4.	"Your Only Love"	Roudette; Hartman	Bran; Kerr	4:04
5.	"Runaround"	Roudette; Samuelsen; Kalla	Bran; Kerr	3:36
6.	"Body Language"	Roudette; Samuelsen; Kalla; Tim Bran; Roy Kerr	Bran; Kerr	4:03
7.	"Better Than Me"	Roudette; Dominic Betmead	Dom Search	4:00
8.	"Flicker"	Roudette; Hartman; Andy Stochansky	Bran; Kerr	3:42
9.	"Too Much To Lose"	Roudette; Samuelsen; Bran; Kerr	Bran; Kerr	3:06
10.	"Hearts Pull"	Roudette; Samuelsen; Persson; David Jost	Bran; Kerr	4:56
11.	"Three Hearts"	Roudette; Brian West	Bran; Kerr	4:09
12.	"In Luck"	Roudette; Stuart Matthewman; Richard Bundy	Bran; Kerr	4:05
13.	"Nice Things"	Roudette	Bran; Kerr	2:46

== Charts ==
Chart (2014)	Peak position
Austrian Albums (Ö3 Austria)	26
German Albums (Offizielle Top 100)	16
Swiss Albums (Schweizer Hitparade)	4

== Release history ==
Region	Release date	Format	Label
Germany	8 August 2014	Digital Download	Universal Music
United States	25 March 2016	Digital Download	Sony Entertainment
