= Things Have Changed (Mattafix song) =

Single by Mattafix

from the album Rhythm & Hymns
- Released: 5 May 2008
- Recorded: 2007
- Genre: Hip hop; electronic; trip hop
- Length: 3:46
- Label: x
- Songwriter(s): Marlon Roudette/Preetesh Hirji

Mattafix singles chronology
"Living Darfur" (2007)	"Things Have Changed" (2008)

"Things Have Changed" is a song from Mattafix's second studio album Rhythm and Hymns, released in May 2008.

== Charts ==
Chart (2008)	Peak position
Czech Republic (Rádio – Top 100)	81
Slovakia (Rádio Top 100)	57
