= Teenage Mutant Ninja Turtles (2003 TV series) season 1 =

Teenage Mutant Ninja Turtles
- Season 1
- No. of episodes: 26

Release
- Original network: 4Kids TV
- Original release: February 8 – November 1, 2003

Season chronology
- Next → Season 2

The first season of Teenage Mutant Ninja Turtles originally aired between February 8, 2003 and November 1, 2003, beginning with the pilot episode "Things Change". The episodes were first released in eight volumes, TMNT Volume One through Volume Eight. The volumes were released from September 2, 2003 through March 16, 2004. The episodes were later released in 2 part season sets, part 1 was released on May 22, 2007 which had the first 12 episodes, and part 2 was released on September 18, 2007, which had the final 14 episodes of the season.

== Story ==
The season primarily focuses on the Turtles slowly coming into conflict with the Foot Clan. After their lair is destroyed by Baxter Stockman's mousers, they find a new home elsewhere in the sewers and also gain new allies in the form of April O'Neil and Casey Jones. The Turtles foil the plans of the Shredder, Hun, and Stockman on numerous occasions before Shredder offers Leonardo a peace offering in exchange for their service, citing an unknown evil they must face together. Master Splinter reveals the Shredder and Hun's hand in murdering his master Hamato Yoshi, and the two sides come to blows in a battle that ends in the Shredder's defeat. The Turtles then venture underground to investigate a collection of crystals found in their new lair, encountering experiments in the form of human-turned monsters created in a Foot genetics lab, and an abandoned city from a lost civilization. Upon returning to the sewers they find the remnants of the Foot hunting them, so they and Splinter hide in April's apartment. However, unknown to the Turtles, the Shredder survived their first encounter, and after his ninjas savagely ambush and wound Leonardo, they destroy April's home and believe them to be dead. In reality the Turtles, Splinter, Casey, and April escaped and depart for the Jones family's farmhouse in rural Massachusetts. After Leonardo's wounds heal and their resolve is restored, the group returns to New York to face the Foot Clan, seemingly defeating the Shredder for good this time. However, following their triumph Splinter vanishes, and after following a lead from a mysterious group known as "the Guardians," the Turtles discover the Utroms, an alien race hiding amongst humanity, but are unable to free Splinter from their custody before being teleported into space.

== Cast ==
=== Main ===
- Michael Sinterniklaas as Leonardo: the leader of the Turtles who wields twin katana swords and wears a blue mask. (appears in all 26 episodes)
- Sam Riegel as Donatello: the Turtles' genius engineer who is the primary source of their devices and vehicles. He wields a bo staff and wears a purple mask. (appears in all 26 episodes)
- Frank Frankson as Raphael: The most stubborn and temperamental of the four turtles who wields twin sai and wears a red mask. (appears in all 26 episodes)
- Wayne Grayson as Michelangelo: the Turtles' wise guy and a large source of comic relief who wields twin nunchucks and wears an orange mask. (appears in all 26 episodes)
- Darren Dunstan as Splinter: the Turtles' sensei and adopted father, the former pet of Hamato Yoshi. (appears in 22 episodes.)

=== Supporting ===
- Veronica Taylor as April O'Neil: the first human the Turtles and Splinter meet who is quickly integrated into their family. (appears in 16 episodes)
- Marc Thompson as Casey Jones: an ally of the Turtles who has a violent enmity with Hun. (appears in 12 episodes)
- Terrance Archie as Silver Sentry: a friend of Michelangelo.

=== Villains ===
- Scottie Ray as Oroku Saki/The Shredder: the main antagonist of the series and leader of the Foot Clan, who murdered Hamato Yoshi. (appears in 13 episodes)
- Greg Carey as Hun: the Shredder's second-in-command, a hulking gangster who leads the Purple Dragons on behalf of his master.
- Scott Williams as Baxter Stockman: a brilliant, maniacal scientist working for the Foot who is mutilated every time he fails the Shredder.
- Michael Alston Bailey as Big Boss: the leader of the Mob.
- Mike Pollock as Garbageman: the evil garbage-man who kidnaps homeless people.

== Crew ==
Teenage Mutant Ninja Turtles was produced by Mirage Studios, 4 Kids Entertainment, 4Kids Productions, and Dong Woo Animation and distributed by 4 Kids Entertainment and was aired on Fox's Saturday morning kids' block in the US. The producers were Gary Richardson, Frederick U. Fierst, and Joellyn Marlow for the American team; Tae Ho Han was the producer for the Korean team. The entire season was directed by Chuck Patton. The writers for season one were Michael Ryan, Marty Isenberg, Eric Luke, and Greg Johnson.

== Episodes ==
| No. | Title | Directed by | Written by | Original release date | TV broadcast |
|---|---|---|---|---|---|
| 1 | "Things Change" | Chuck Patton | Michael Ryan | February 8, 2003 | S01E01 |
In the midst of an intense training session with Master Splinter, the Teenage Mutant Ninja Turtles are attacked by Mouser robots, which tear asunder their underground New York City home and separate them from their sensei. With their lair destroyed, the Turtles must search for their Master and find a new home.
| 2 | "A Better Mousetrap" | Chuck Patton | Marty Isenberg | February 15, 2003 | S01E02 |
After the Turtles settle into their new lair, they discover the source of their Mouser problem: Stocktronics founder and CEO, Dr. Baxter Stockman. Donatello repairs a disabled Mouser and the Turtles track it through the sewers, where coincidentally they stumble upon April O'Neil, a young apprentice fleeing from the wrath of Dr. Stockman.
| 3 | "Attack of the Mousers" | Chuck Patton | Eric Luke | February 22, 2003 | S01E03 |
After fainting from their initial encounter, April O'Neil wakes up in the Turtles' lair. It is there April learns of the Turtles' origin, and they all agree that Baxter Stockman and his rampaging Mousers must be stopped.
| 4 | "Meet Casey Jones" | Chuck Patton | Michael Ryan | March 1, 2003 | S01E04 |
During a sparring session, Raphael lets his anger get the best of him and almost hurts Michelangelo seriously. He decides to go "topside" to cool off and meets someone filled with a lot more anger than him: a streetwise vigilante named Casey Jones.
| 5 | "Nano" | Chuck Patton | Eric Luke | March 8, 2003 | S01E05 |
A small-time thief goes on a crime spree when he stumbles upon a form of artificial intelligence made up of nanotechnology. When the crook and his ward reach April O'Neil's new antique shop, "2nd Time Around", they face off against Casey and the Turtles.
| 6 | "Darkness on the Edge of Town" | Chuck Patton | Marty Isenberg | March 15, 2003 | S01E06 |
After a blackout knocks out the lights in the lair, the Turtles go topside to investigate. Once above ground, the Turtles encounter the mysterious Foot Clan gathering artifacts from around the city.
| 7 | "The Way of Invisibility" | Chuck Patton | Marty Isenberg | March 22, 2003 | S01E07 |
Casey Jones becomes an unwanted house guest in the Turtles' lair, so Raphael takes him topside to get some much-needed air. During a routine skirmish with a street gang known as the Purple Dragons, Raph and Casey encounter the Foot Tech Ninja, whose cyber-armor enhances their strength and speed while giving them invisibility. Raphael is kidnapped and then interrogated by Hun, while Casey escapes to get help.
| 8 | "Fallen Angel" | Chuck Patton | Marty Isenberg | March 29, 2003 | S01E08 |
Angel, a girl Casey knows from the neighborhood, is going through her initiation to join the Purple Dragons. Casey fears her going down the wrong path and tries to stop her from joining the gang with the help of the Turtles.
| 9 | "Garbageman" | Chuck Patton | Eric Luke | April 5, 2003 | S01E09 |
When homeless people start to disappear mysteriously, the Turtles set out to investigate. Their search leads them to a garbage-filled island where the homeless are being used as slaves by the villainous Garbageman.
| 10 | "The Shredder Strikes" | Chuck Patton | Michael Ryan | April 12, 2003 | S01E10 |
| 11 | "The Shredder Strikes" | Chuck Patton | Michael Ryan | April 19, 2003 | S01E11 |
Leonardo meets a mysterious man named Oroku Saki, who appears to be the leader of the Foot Clan. Despite previous skirmishes with the Foot, Leo is offered a truce and a chance to fight against a "greater evil". Almost taken in by his offer, Leo's brothers encourage him to consult Master Splinter. They soon learn the true nature of the Foot, their leader, and the significance of their emblem. After facing several foot ninjas and Hun, Oroku Saki reveals himself as the Shredder. The Turtles soon find themselves outmatched and make a hasty retreat. Concurrently, Master Splinter searches for his sons and after finding them prepares a counteroffensive. During another encounter with the Shredder, the Turtles are cornered, but Splinter intervenes and tricks him into weakening a water tower's supports and sends it crashing on him. Victorious, the Turtles go home but unbeknownst to them, Shredder emerges from the rubble.
| 12 | "The Unconvincing Turtle Titan" | Chuck Patton | Marty Isenberg | May 3, 2003 | S01E12 |
Michelangelo yearns to use his fighting abilities to help others in the city, leading him to create his alter ego: Turtle Titan. While attempting to team up with his superhero inspiration, Silver Sentry, Mikey must battle his hero's arch-nemesis, Dr. Malignus.
| 13 | "Notes from the Underground" | Chuck Patton | Eric Luke | May 10, 2003 | S01E13 |
| 14 | "Notes from the Underground" | Chuck Patton | Greg Johnson | May 17, 2003 | S01E14 |
| 15 | "Notes from the Underground" | Chuck Patton | Greg Johnson | May 24, 2003 | So1E15 |
While Donatello examines a pair of mysterious crystals, the lair's perimeter alarm is triggered after the crystals begin to glow. The Turtles investigate and find tracks indicating the presence of some unknown creature. These tracks lead them deep underground where they uncover an abandoned Foot Genetics Lab. Inside, they learn of past experiments that turned human subjects into monsters with the intent of hunting Shredder's enemies. The brothers soon encounter a group of these creatures who are at first hostile, but eventually become allies and decide to help them evade the attacks of similar, but mindless monsters. They go deeper into the seemingly haunted catacombs, where creatures and Donatello have disappeared. The source of the mysterious crystals found in the lair appears to be an ancient subterranean city and is also the location where Donatello and the Turtles' monster allies disappear. The city is inhabited by the sole survivor of an ancient race. Although he claims that he wants to return the creatures to their original forms, his true intentions remain unknown. The Entity starts to attack the Turtles, but Michelangelo uses a light orb to encase the Entity in ice crystal. The Turtles free Quarry to find that he, is actually a she! All of the other mutants are also returned to normal when freed. However, they find out as they try to leave the city that, are only cured by the power of the crystals and have to stay in the city to keep their human form. Donatello vows to find a solution that will let them return above ground. On the way home, the Turtles find out that the Foot are searching for them and the sewers are not safe, so they go into hiding at April's place.
| 16 | "The King" | Chuck Patton | Michael Ryan | May 31, 2003 | S01E16 |
With the Foot scouring the sewers, the Turtles move in with April. When the water heater breaks down, Donatello goes down to the basement to fix it. Here Don meets April's tenant, Kirby, an artist whose mysterious power opens an adventure to another dimension.
| 17 | "The Shredder Strikes Back" | Chuck Patton | Eric Luke | June 7, 2003 | S01E17 |
| 18 | "The Shredder Strikes Back" | Chuck Patton | Eric Luke | June 14, 2003 | S01E18 |
During an early morning training run, Leonardo encounters a legion of Foot Ninja and Hun. A thunderstorm develops not long before Leo encounters a new foe, the Foot Elite. As he becomes overwhelmed, Leo witnesses the return of an unexpected enemy: the Shredder. After being thrown through a window into April's apartment, Leonardo lies unconscious while his brothers and Master Splinter defend themselves against waves of attacking Foot Ninja. Desiring revenge, the Shredder seeks to destroy the Turtles and their allies at any cost. As the Turtles and their allies are retreating, Shredder blows up the building. Note: This plot is Based on the 1990 film.
| 19 | "Tales of Leo" | Chuck Patton | Marty Isenberg | September 13, 2003 | S01E19 |
After getting out of the building a few seconds before the explosion, the Turtles, Splinter, Casey, and April head to the old farmhouse of Casey's grandmother. As Leonardo lies unconscious, each member of his family tells Leonardo a tale of his early adventures as a child, hoping their voices will rouse him back to consciousness. Leonardo finally awakes but still remains in bad shape. Meanwhile in New York, Shredder wants evidence that the Turtles were destroyed. Stockman manages to deceive Shredder that his enemies are gone and secretly swears revenge on his master.
| 20 | "The Monster Hunter" | Chuck Patton | Michael Ryan | September 20, 2003 | S01E20 |
Still recuperating at the old farmhouse, the Turtles try to keep themselves busy. Raphael helps Leonardo forge new katana blades while Michelangelo, Donatello, and Casey deal with the overzealous Abigail Finn, who hopes to catch the legendary "Green Man of the Woods".
| 21 | "Return to New York" | Chuck Patton | Marty Isenberg (first 2 parts) & Michael Ryan | September 27, 2003 | S01E21 |
| 22 | "Return to New York" | Chuck Patton | Marty Isenberg (first 2 parts) & Michael Ryan | October 4, 2003 | S01E22 |
| 23 | "Return to New York" | Chuck Patton | Marty Isenberg (first 2 parts) & Michael Ryan | October 11, 2003 | S01E23 |
The Turtles return to New York City and are preparing for the battle against the Shredder. Thinking that he has destroyed his enemies, the Shredder is unprepared for a surprise attack on his headquarters by the Turtles and Splinter. With April providing computer intel at the lair, the Turtles work their way up to the Shredder, floor by floor. Continuing their assault, the Turtles and Splinter encounter mutant clones in a Foot Genetics Lab and a near indomitable foe, the Foot Mystic Ninjas. The Turtles finally make it to the Shredder's throne room, but they are interrupted by an exosuit-clad Baxter Stockman, who wants to get revenge on both the Shredder and the Turtles. The Turtles are forced to work with the Shredder to defeat Baxter Stockman. The Turtles then continue to fight the Shredder, with master Splinter being wounded. With help from a mysterious group of warriors known as the Guardians, the Turtles defeat the Shredder but find that Master Splinter has disappeared.
| 24 | "Lone Raph and Cub" | Chuck Patton | Eric Luke | October 18, 2003 | S01E24 |
With the Shredder defeated, his headquarters destroyed, and the Foot in disarray, the Turtles turn to a new problem: Master Splinter is missing. Angry and confused, Raphael impatiently heads out to find him, only to be thrust into a solo adventure helping a headstrong kid, Tyler, against ruthless mobsters.
| 25 | "The Search for Splinter" | Chuck Patton | Greg Johnson | October 25, 2003 | S01E25 |
| 26 | "The Search for Splinter" | Chuck Patton | Greg Johnson | November 1, 2003 | S01E26 |
After a frustrating and exhaustive search for Splinter, the Turtles' suspicions turn towards the Guardians. This suspicion leads them to an austere building with the company name TCRI – the same name on the canister of ooze responsible for their mutation. Following their only lead, the Turtles enlist April and Casey to help them get inside. The Turtles manage to infiltrate the TCRI building, discovering that there is more to the employees and to the building itself than meets the eye. They manage to find an unconscious Splinter in a stasis tank but soon find themselves transported to a place unknown.
